= 1952 Minnesota Secretary of State election =

- November 4, 1952

Nominee	Virginia Paul Holm	Koscie H. Marsh
Party	Republican	Democratic (DFL)
Popular vote	773,913	605,680
Percentage	56.10%	43.90%
- County results Holm: 50-60% 60-70% 70-80% Marsh: 50-60% 60-70%
Secretary of State before election
Virginia Paul Holm
Republican
Elected Secretary of State
Virginia Paul Holm
Republican

The 1952 Minnesota Secretary of State election was held on November 4, 1952, in order to elect the Secretary of State of Minnesota. Republican nominee and incumbent Secretary of State Virginia Paul Holm defeated Democratic–Farmer–Labor nominee Koscie H. Marsh. Virginia Paul Holm also won a special election to serve the remainder of her late husband's term that same day against another candidate.

== General election ==
On election day, November 4, 1952, Republican nominee Virginia Paul Holm won the election by a margin of 168,233 votes against her opponent Democratic–Farmer–Labor nominee Koscie H. Marsh, thereby retaining Republican control over the office of Secretary of State. Paul Holm was sworn in for her first full term on January 5, 1953.

=== Results ===
Minnesota Secretary of State election, 1952
Party	Candidate	Votes	%
Republican	Virginia Paul Holm (incumbent)	773,913	56.10
Democratic (DFL)	Koscie H. Marsh	605,680	43.90
Total votes		1,379,593	100.00
Republican hold			
