= 1952 Minnesota Secretary of State special election =

- November 4, 1952

Nominee	Virginia Paul Holm	Melvin Cooper
Party	Republican	Democratic (DFL)
Popular vote	760,718	552,780
Percentage	57.92%	42.08%
Secretary of State before election
Virginia Paul Holm (Acting)
Republican
Elected Secretary of State
Virginia Paul Holm
Republican

The 1952 Minnesota Secretary of State special election was held on November 4, 1952, in order to elect the Secretary of State of Minnesota. Republican nominee and incumbent Acting Secretary of State Virginia Paul Holm defeated Democratic–Farmer–Labor nominee Melvin Cooper in order te serve out the remainder of Virginia Paul Holm's late husband's term. Paul Holm also won a full term to the office that same day against another candidate.

== General election ==
On election day, November 4, 1952, Republican nominee Virginia Paul Holm won the election by a margin of 207,938 votes against her opponent Democratic–Farmer–Labor nominee Melvin Cooper, thereby retaining Republican control over the office of Secretary of State. Paul Holm was sworn in to serve the remainder of her late husband's term on November 5, 1952.

=== Results ===
Minnesota Secretary of State special election, 1952
Party	Candidate	Votes	%
Republican	Virginia Paul Holm (incumbent)	760,718	57.92
Democratic (DFL)	Melvin Cooper	552,780	42.08
Total votes		1,313,498	100.00
Republican hold			
