= Koryne Kaneski Horbal =

American politician

United States representative on the Commission on the Status of Women

State Chair of the Minnesota Democratic–Farmer–Labor Party
- In office 1968–1977
- Preceded by: Hank Fischer (As Chairman); Betty Kane (As Chairwoman)
- Succeeded by: Claire Rumpel

Personal details
- Born: February 11, 1937 Eveleth, Minnesota
- Died: Mary 15, 2017 Arden Hills, Minnesota

Koryne Kaneski Horbal (February 11, 1937 - May 15, 2017) was a United States representative on the Commission on the Status of Women of the Economic and Social Council of the United Nations. She also served as a chairwoman of the Minnesota Democratic Farmer Labor Party.

In 1973, she and five other women founded the DFL Feminist Caucus, with Horbal as Chair. It was the first instance of U.S. party regulars organizing as an independent political force outside their own party to support feminist principles, including the Equal Rights Amendment, reproductive rights, workplace equity, and, most controversially, a pledge to support only DFL candidates who would endorse the caucus principles.

In 1980, although she was not a candidate, Horbal won five votes for President of the United States at the Democratic National Convention, which placed her after Jimmy Carter, Ted Kennedy, and William Proxmire (see below).

1980 Democratic National Convention

- Jimmy Carter (inc.) – 2,123 (64.04%)
- Ted Kennedy – 1,151 (34.72%)
- William Proxmire – 10 (0.30%)
- Koryne Kaneski Horbal – 5 (0.15%)
- Scott M. Matheson, Sr. – 5 (0.15%)
- Ron Dellums – 3 (0.09%)
- Robert Byrd – 2 (0.06%)
- John Culver – 2 (0.06%)
- Kent Hance – 2 (0.06%)
- Jennings Randolph – 2 (0.06%)
- Warren Spannaus – 2 (0.06%)
- Alice Tripp – 2 (0.06%)
- Jerry Brown – 1 (0.03%)
- Dale Bumpers – 1 (0.03%)
- Hugh L. Carey – 1 (0.03%)
- Walter Mondale – 1 (0.03%)
- Edmund Muskie – 1 (0.03%)
- Thomas J. Steed – 1 (0.03%)

In 2004, Augsburg College established the Koryne Horbal Lecture series in her honor. The series has featured Robin Morgan (2004), Jane Fonda (2007), Winona LaDuke (2008), Alicia Cabezudo (2009), and The Guerrilla Girls (2010), among others.

In 2008, Augsburg College (now Augsburg University) awarded Horbal an Honorary Doctorate in Humane Letters, in recognition of her work around the world, "which has given voice to women's political and social issues".

She died on 15 May 2017, at the age of 80, of heart failure.

Party political offices
Preceded by Betty Kane	Democratic-Farmer-Labor Party Chairwoman; 1968-1972	Succeeded by None
Preceded by Herself (As Chairwoman); Hank Fischer (As Chairman)	Democratic-Farmer-Labor Party State Chair; 1968-1977	Succeeded by Claire Rumpel
