= 1978 Minnesota Attorney General election =

- November 7, 1978
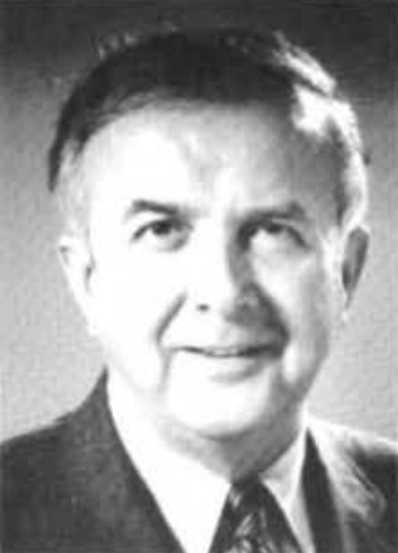

Nominee	Warren Spannaus	Howard A. Knutson
Party	Democratic (DFL)	Republican
Popular vote	858,547	612,122
Percentage	55.90%	39.85%
- County results Spannaus: 40–50% 50–60% 60–70% Knutson: 40–50% 50–60%
Attorney General before election
Warren Spannaus
Democratic (DFL)
Elected Attorney General
Warren Spannaus
Democratic (DFL)

The 1978 Minnesota Attorney General election was held on November 7, 1978, in order to elect the attorney general of Minnesota. Democratic–Farmer–Labor nominee and incumbent attorney general Warren Spannaus defeated Republican nominee and incumbent member of the Minnesota Senate Howard A. Knutson and American Party nominee Arnold P. Olsen.

== General election ==
On election day, November 7, 1978, Democratic–Farmer–Labor nominee Warren Spannaus won re-election by a margin of 246,425 votes against his foremost opponent Republican nominee Howard A. Knutson, thereby retaining Democratic–Farmer–Labor Party control over the office of attorney general. Spannaus was sworn in for his third term on January 2, 1979.

=== Results ===
Minnesota Attorney General election, 1978
Party	Candidate	Votes	%
Democratic (DFL)	Warren Spannaus (incumbent)	858,547	55.90
Republican	Howard A. Knutson	612,122	39.85
American	Arnold P. Olsen	65,256	4.25
Total votes		1,535,925	100.00
Democratic (DFL) hold			
