= 1922 Minnesota Secretary of State election =

- November 7, 1922
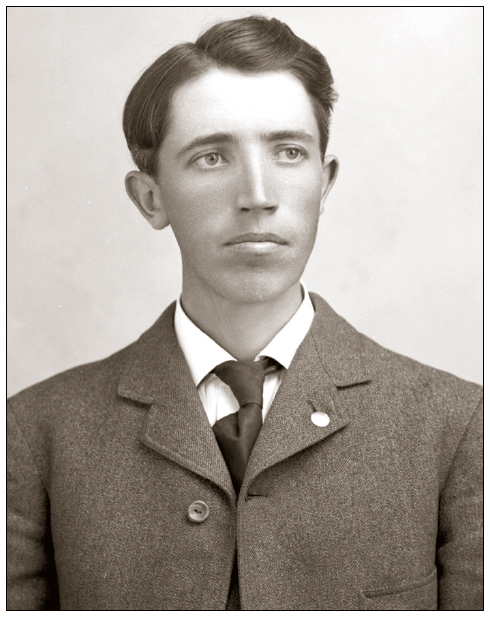

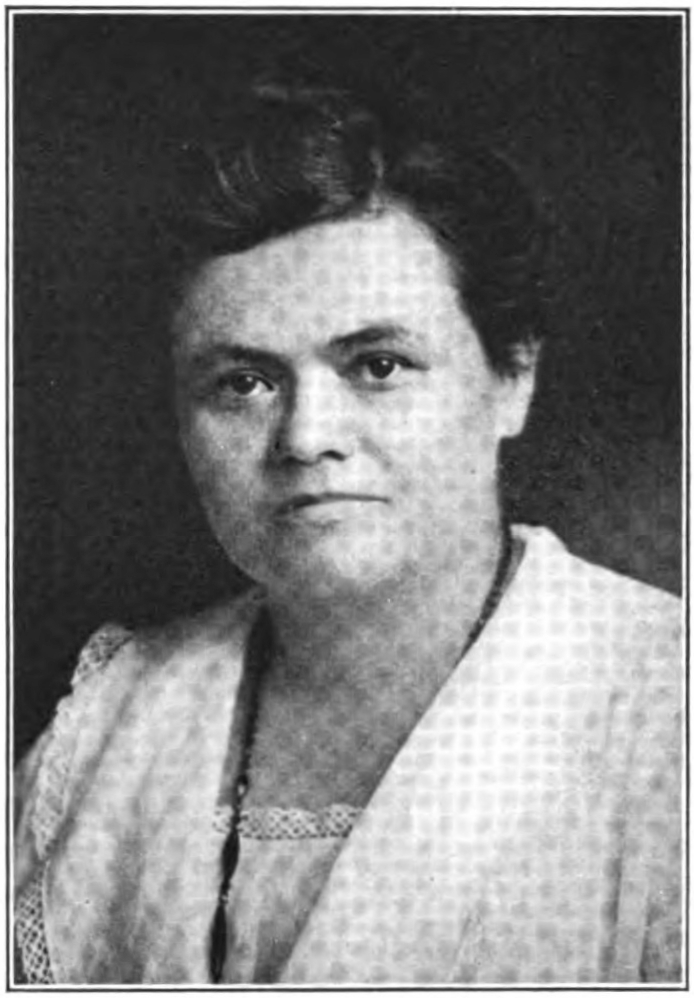

Nominee	Mike Holm	Susie Williamson Stageberg	Claude Swanson
Party	Republican	Farmer–Labor	Democratic
Popular vote	348,559	247,757	66,616
Percentage	52.58%	37.37%	10.05%
Secretary of State before election
Mike Holm
Republican
Elected Secretary of State
Mike Holm
Republican

The 1922 Minnesota Secretary of State election was held on November 7, 1922, in order to elect the Secretary of State of Minnesota. Republican nominee and incumbent Secretary of State Mike Holm defeated Farmer–Labor nominee Susie W. Stageberg and Democratic nominee Claude Swanson.

== General election ==
On election day, November 7, 1922, Republican nominee Mike Holm won re-election by a margin of 100,802 votes against his foremost opponent Farmer–Labor nominee Susie W. Stageberg, thereby retaining Republican control over the office of Secretary of State. Holm was sworn in for his second term on January 3, 1923.

=== Results ===
Minnesota Secretary of State election, 1922
Party	Candidate	Votes	%
Republican	Mike Holm (incumbent)	348,559	52.58
Farmer–Labor	Susie Williamson Stageberg	247,757	37.37
Democratic	Claude Swanson	66,616	10.05
Total votes		662,932	100.00
Republican hold			
