= 1974 Minnesota Attorney General election =

- November 5, 1974
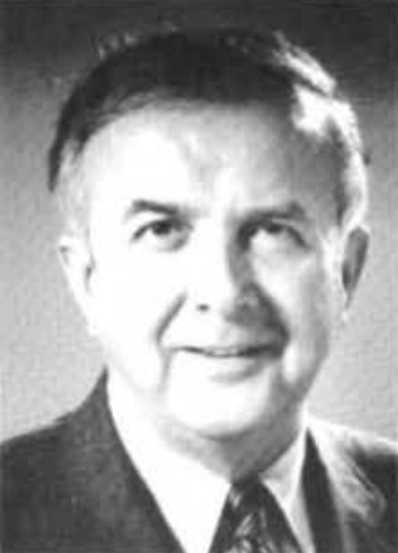

Nominee	Warren Spannaus	Dean Nyquist
Party	Democratic (DFL)	Republican
Popular vote	786,857	396,441
Percentage	64.29%	32.39%
- County results Spannaus: 50–60% 60–70% 70–80% Nyquist: 40–50%
Attorney General before election
Warren Spannaus
Democratic (DFL)
Elected Attorney General
Warren Spannaus
Democratic (DFL)

The 1974 Minnesota Attorney General election was held on November 5, 1974, in order to elect the attorney general of Minnesota. Democratic–Farmer–Labor nominee and incumbent attorney general Warren Spannaus defeated Republican nominee and former member of the Minnesota Senate Dean Nyquist and American Party nominee Allan W. Lamkin.

== General election ==
On election day, November 5, 1974, Democratic–Farmer–Labor nominee Warren Spannaus won re-election by a margin of 390,416 votes against his foremost opponent Republican nominee Dean Nyquist, thereby retaining Democratic–Farmer–Labor Party control over the office of attorney general. Spannaus was sworn in for his second term on January 6, 1975.

=== Results ===
Minnesota Attorney General election, 1974
Party	Candidate	Votes	%
Democratic (DFL)	Warren Spannaus (incumbent)	786,857	64.29
Republican	Dean Nyquist	396,441	32.39
American	Allan W. Lamkin	40,617	3.32
Total votes		1,223,915	100.00
Democratic (DFL) hold			
