= 1954 Minnesota Secretary of State election =

- November 2, 1954

Nominee	Joseph L. Donovan	Virginia Paul Holm
Party	Democratic (DFL)	Republican
Popular vote	587,359	550,154
Percentage	51.64%	48.36%
- County results Donovan: 50–60% 60–70% Holm: 50–60% 60–70% 70–80%
Secretary of State before election
Virginia Paul Holm
Republican
Elected Secretary of State
Joseph L. Donovan
Democratic (DFL)

The 1954 Minnesota secretary of state election was held on November 2, 1954, in order to elect the secretary of state of Minnesota. Democratic–Farmer–Labor nominee Joseph L. Donovan defeated Republican nominee and incumbent Secretary of State Virginia Paul Holm.

== General election ==
On election day, November 2, 1954, Democratic–Farmer–Labor nominee Joseph L. Donovan won the election by a margin of 37,205 votes against his opponent Republican nominee Virginia Paul Holm, thereby gaining Democratic–Farmer–Labor control over the office of secretary of state. Donovan was sworn in as the 17th Minnesota Secretary of State on January 3, 1955.

=== Results ===
Minnesota secretary of state election, 1954
Party	Candidate	Votes	%
Democratic (DFL)	Joseph L. Donovan	587,359	51.64
Republican	Virginia Paul Holm (incumbent)	550,154	48.36
Total votes		1,137,513	100.00
Democratic (DFL) gain from Republican			
