= Progressive Caucus of the Minnesota Democratic–Farmer–Labor Party =

- Chairperson: AP Weston
- Governing body: Coordinating Committee
- Founded: 2005
- Preceded by: Minnesota Progressive Caucus
- Ideology: Progressivism; Left-wing populism
- Political position: Centre-left to Left-wing
- Regional affiliation: Minnesota DFL

Website
- https://dfl-progressive-caucus.org/

The Progressive Caucus of the Minnesota Democratic–Farmer–Labor Party (DFL Progressive Causus or DFLPC) is an caucus within the Minnesota DFL made of progressives.

== History ==
The Minnesota Progressive Caucus was founded in 2004 to oppose the re-election of George W. Bush. Following Bush's re-election, the Minnesota Progressive Caucus became formally affiliated with the DFL and became the current DFLPC in 2005. That year, there was an election for DFL State Chair, and DFLPC member Brian Melendez won.

The DFLPC now held major influence in the party, and began attempting to field primary challengers against more conservative members of the party. A notable enemy of the DFLPC was Martin Olav Sabo, however he retired before he could be challenged. DFLPC backed successor Keith Ellison would win his seat. Moderate Amy Klobuchar was supported in her 2006 campaign, however was pushed to take a stronger stance against the Iraq war.

In 2014, the DFL Environmental Caucus was created as split from the DFL Progressive Caucus.

In 2020, unanimously passed a resolution calling for Minnesota to divest from Israel bonds.

In 2025, the DFLPC opposed state's budget, specifically legislation removing undocumented adult immigrants from eligibility for MinnesotaCare. Minnesota Senate Majority Leader Erin Murphy spoke against the compromise on behalf of the DFLPC. The state budget was passed. Later that year, the DFLPC release a statement condemning transphobia, which was signed by various party officials, including Richard Carlbom, Jason Chavez, and Liish Kozlowski. The YDFL, DFL Disability Caucus, and Stonewall DFL all endorsed the statement.
