= 1950 Minnesota lieutenant gubernatorial election =

- November 7, 1950
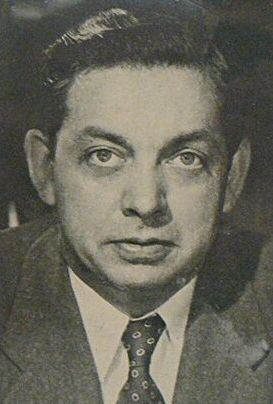

Nominee	C. Elmer Anderson	Frank Murphy
Party	Republican	Democratic (DFL)
Popular vote	588,777	401,148
Percentage	58.35%	39.76%
- County results Anderson: 40–50% 50–60% 60–70% 70–80% Murphy: 40–50% 50–60%
Lieutenant Governor before election
C. Elmer Anderson
Republican
Elected Lieutenant Governor
C. Elmer Anderson
Republican

The 1950 Minnesota lieutenant gubernatorial election took place on November 7, 1950. Incumbent Lieutenant Governor C. Elmer Anderson defeated Minnesota Democratic-Farmer-Labor Party challenger Frank Murphy.

== Results ==
1950 lieutenant gubernatorial election, Minnesota
Party	Candidate	Votes	%	±%
Republican	C. Elmer Anderson (incumbent)	588,777	58.35%	+7.87%
Democratic (DFL)	Frank Murphy	401,148	39.76%	−8.27%
Progressive	Susie Williamson Stageberg	19,043	1.89%	+0.40%
Majority		187,629	18.59%	
Turnout		1,008,968		
Republican hold		Swing		
