= 1924 Minnesota Secretary of State election =

- November 4, 1924
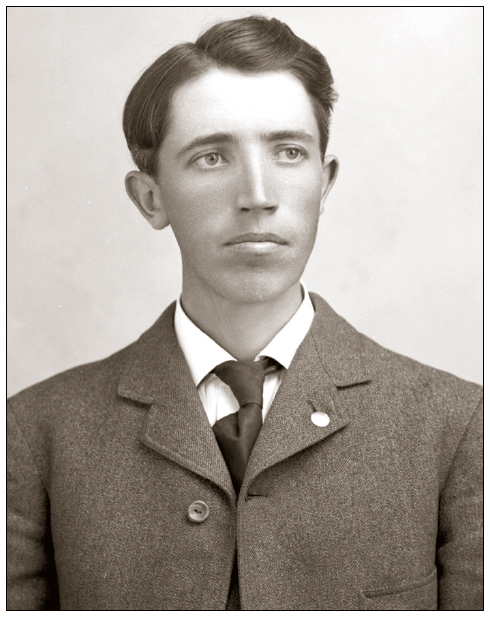

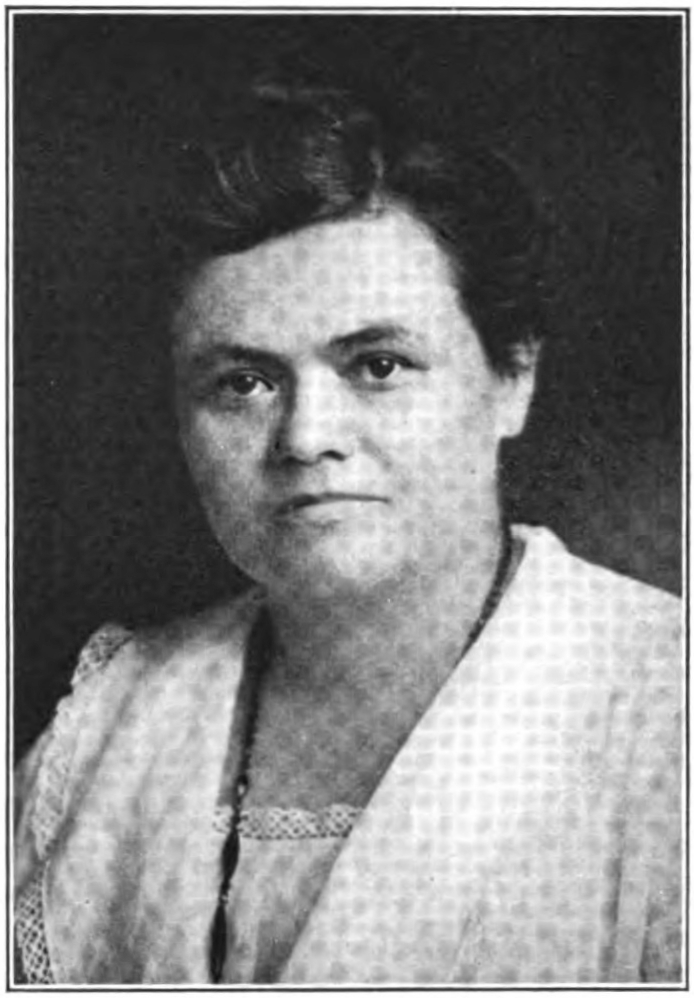

Nominee	Mike Holm	Susie Williamson Stageberg	Claude Swanson
Party	Republican	Farmer–Labor	Democratic
Popular vote	473,577	288,946	45,622
Percentage	58.60%	35.75%	5.65%
Secretary of State before election
Mike Holm
Republican
Elected Secretary of State
Mike Holm
Republican

The 1924 Minnesota Secretary of State election was held on November 4, 1924, in order to elect the Secretary of State of Minnesota. Republican nominee and incumbent Secretary of State Mike Holm defeated Farmer–Labor nominee Susie W. Stageberg and Democratic nominee Ole C. Halverson.

== General election ==
On election day, November 4, 1924, Republican nominee Mike Holm won re-election by a margin of 184,631 votes against his foremost opponent Farmer–Labor nominee Susie W. Stageberg, thereby retaining Republican control over the office of Secretary of State. Holm was sworn in for his third term on January 3, 1925.

=== Results ===
Minnesota Secretary of State election, 1924
Party	Candidate	Votes	%
Republican	Mike Holm (incumbent)	473,577	58.60
Farmer–Labor	Susie Williamson Stageberg	288,946	35.75
Democratic	Ole C. Halverson	45,622	5.65
Total votes		808,145	100.00
Republican hold			
