= 1928 Minnesota Secretary of State election =

- November 6, 1928
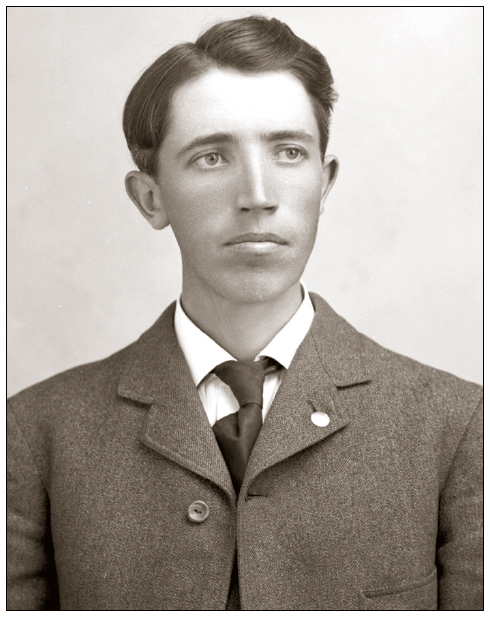

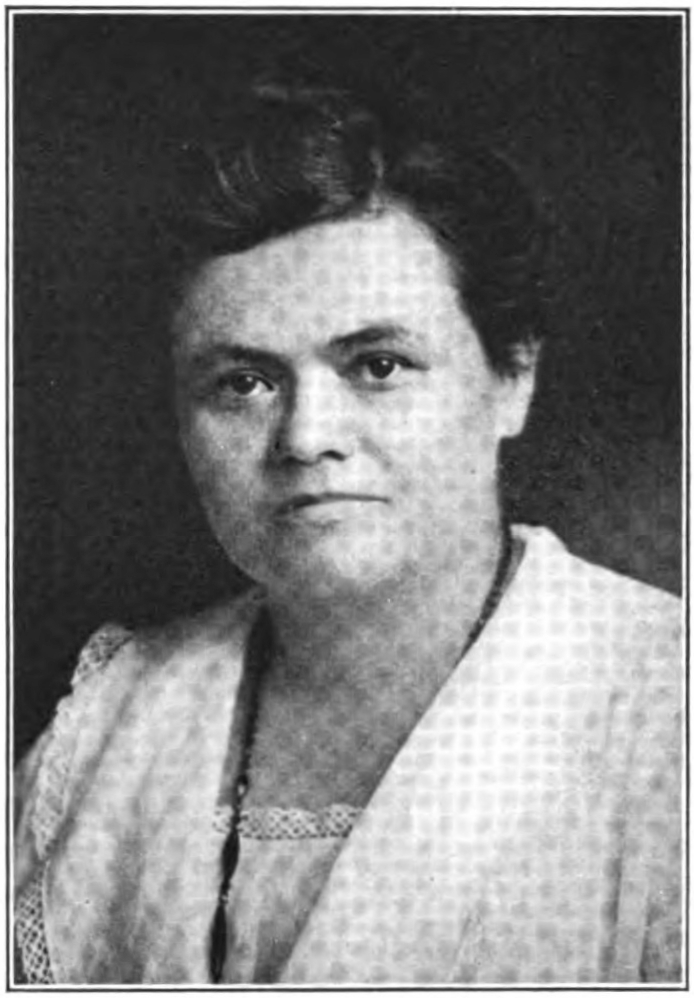

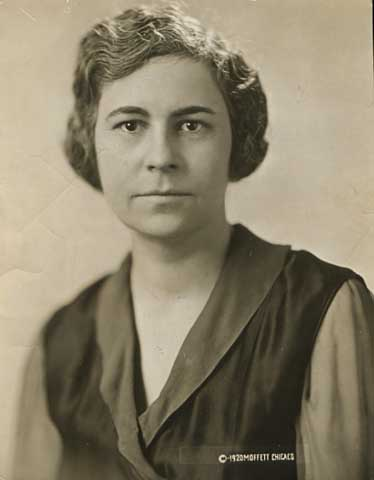
Nominee	Mike Holm	Susie W. Stageberg	Ruth Haynes Carpenter
Party	Republican	Farmer–Labor	Democratic
Popular vote	625,712	178,096	163,771
Percentage	64.67%	18.40%	16.93%
Secretary of State before election
Mike Holm
Republican
Elected Secretary of State
Mike Holm
Republican

The 1928 Minnesota Secretary of State election was held on November 6, 1928, in order to elect the Secretary of State of Minnesota. Republican nominee and incumbent Secretary of State Mike Holm defeated Farmer–Labor nominee Susie W. Stageberg and Democratic nominee Ruth Haynes Carpenter.

== General election ==
On election day, November 6, 1928, Republican nominee Mike Holm won re-election by a margin of 447,616 votes against his foremost opponent Farmer–Labor nominee Susie W. Stageberg, thereby retaining Republican control over the office of Secretary of State. Holm was sworn in for his fifth term on January 3, 1929.

=== Results ===
Minnesota Secretary of State election, 1928
Party	Candidate	Votes	%
Republican	Mike Holm (incumbent)	625,712	64.67
Farmer–Labor	Susie Williamson Stageberg	178,096	18.40
Democratic	Ruth Haynes Carpenter	163,771	16.93
Total votes		967,579	100.00
Republican hold			
