= 1926 Minnesota Secretary of State election =

- November 2, 1926
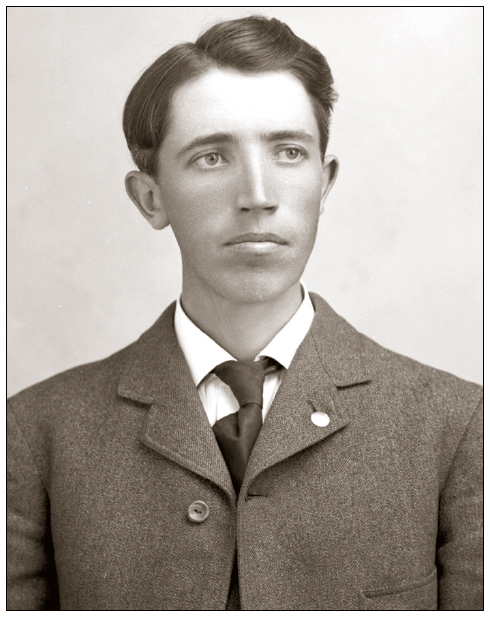

Nominee	Mike Holm	Charles Olson
Party	Republican	Farmer–Labor
Popular vote	449,447	217,424
Percentage	67.40%	32.60%
Secretary of State before election
Mike Holm
Republican
Elected Secretary of State
Mike Holm
Republican

The 1926 Minnesota Secretary of State election was held on November 2, 1926, in order to elect the Secretary of State of Minnesota. Republican nominee and incumbent Secretary of State Mike Holm defeated Farmer–Labor nominee Charles Olson.

== General election ==
On election day, November 2, 1926, Republican nominee Mike Holm won re-election by a margin of 232,023 votes against his opponent Farmer–Labor nominee Charles Olson, thereby retaining Republican control over the office of Secretary of State. Holm was sworn in for his fourth term on January 3, 1927.

=== Results ===
Minnesota Secretary of State election, 1926
Party	Candidate	Votes	%
Republican	Mike Holm (incumbent)	449,447	67.40
Farmer–Labor	Charles Olson	217,424	32.60
Total votes		666,871	100.00
Republican hold			
