= David Knutson =

American politician

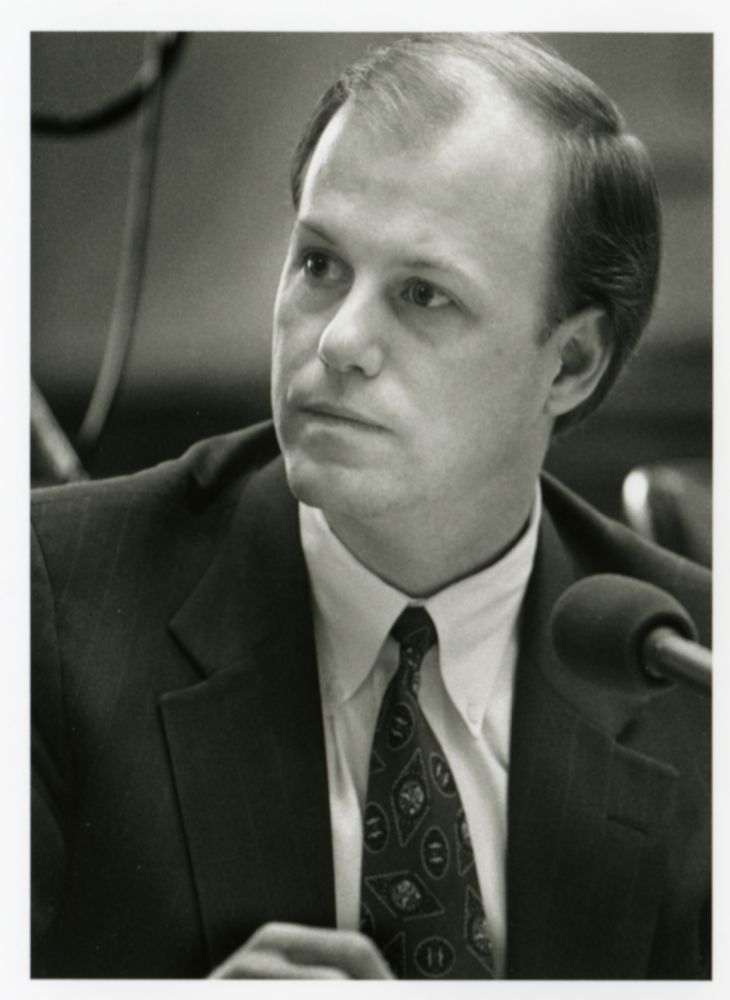
- Knutson during a committee hearing, 1993

Member of the Minnesota Senate from the 37th district
- In office 2003–2004

Member of the Minnesota Senate from the 36th district
- In office 1993–2002

Personal details
- Born: November 24, 1959 (age 66)
- Party: Republican
- Relations: Howard A. Knutson (father)
- Children: two
- Education: St. Olaf College, William Mitchell College of Law
- Occupation: attorney, judge

David L. Knutson (born November 24, 1959) is an American politician and judge in the state of Minnesota.

Knutson graduated from Burnsville High School in Burnsville, Minnesota. Knutson graduated from St. Olaf College and from William Mitchell College of Law. He lives in Burnsville, Minnesota with his wife and family and practiced law in Burnsville. He served in the Minnesota Senate from 1993 to 2004 and was a Republican. Knutson served as a Minnesota District Court judge from 2004 to the present time. His father Howard A. Knutson also served in the Minnesota Legislature.
