= 1946 Minnesota Secretary of State election =

- November 5, 1946
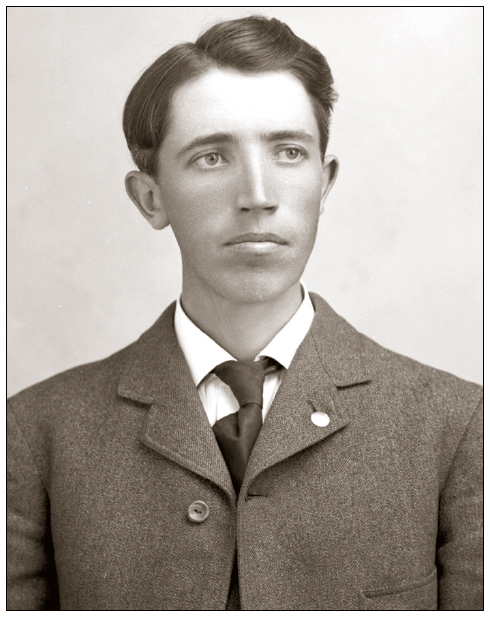

Nominee	Mike Holm	Frances Delaney
Party	Republican	Democratic (DFL)
Popular vote	606,418	271,133
Percentage	69.10%	30.90%
- County results Holm: 50-60% 60-70% 70-80% 80-90%
Secretary of State before election
Mike Holm
Republican
Elected Secretary of State
Mike Holm
Republican

The 1946 Minnesota Secretary of State election was held on November 5, 1946, in order to elect the Secretary of State of Minnesota. Republican nominee and incumbent Secretary of State Mike Holm defeated Democratic–Farmer–Labor nominee Frances Delaney.

== General election ==
On election day, November 5, 1946, Republican nominee Mike Holm won re-election by a margin of 335,285 votes against his opponent Democratic–Farmer–Labor nominee Frances Delaney, thereby retaining Republican control over the office of Secretary of State. Holm was sworn in for his fourteenth term on January 3, 1947.

=== Results ===
Minnesota Secretary of State election, 1946
Party	Candidate	Votes	%
Republican	Mike Holm (incumbent)	606,418	69.10
Democratic (DFL)	Frances Delaney	271,133	30.90
Total votes		877,551	100.00
Republican hold			
