= 1932 Minnesota Secretary of State election =

- November 8, 1932
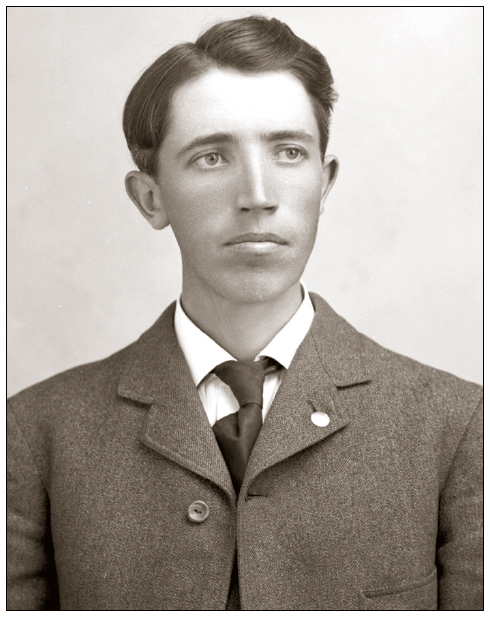

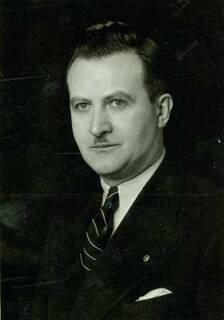

Nominee	Mike Holm	John T. Lyons	Jerry A. Harri
Party	Republican	Farmer–Labor	Democratic
Popular vote	451,611	342,496	182,065
Percentage	45.88%	34.79%	18.50%
Secretary of State before election
Mike Holm
Republican
Elected Secretary of State
Mike Holm
Republican

The 1932 Minnesota Secretary of State election was held on November 8, 1932, in order to elect the Secretary of State of Minnesota. Republican nominee and incumbent Secretary of State Mike Holm defeated Farmer–Labor nominee John T. Lyons, Democratic nominee Jerry A. Harri and Communist nominee Robert Turner.

== General election ==
On election day, November 8, 1932, Republican nominee Mike Holm won re-election by a margin of 109,115 votes against his foremost opponent Farmer–Labor nominee John T. Lyons, thereby retaining Republican control over the office of Secretary of State. Holm was sworn in for his seventh term on January 2, 1933.

=== Results ===
Minnesota Secretary of State election, 1932
Party	Candidate	Votes	%
Republican	Mike Holm (incumbent)	451,611	45.88
Farmer–Labor	John T. Lyons	342,496	34.79
Democratic	Jerry A. Harri	182,065	18.50
Communist	Robert Turner	8,180	0.83
Total votes		984,352	100.00
Republican hold			
