= 1970 Minnesota Attorney General election =

- November 3, 1970
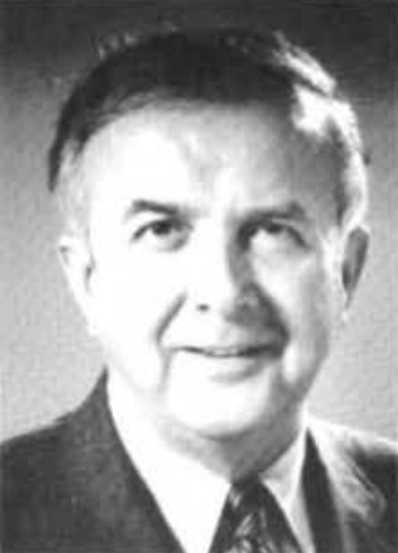

Nominee	Warren Spannaus	Robert A. Forsythe
Party	Democratic (DFL)	Republican
Popular vote	680,479	644,390
Percentage	51.36%	48.64%
- County results Spannaus: 50–60% 60–70% Forsythe: 50–60% 60–70%
Attorney General before election
Douglas M. Head
Republican
Elected Attorney General
Warren Spannaus
Democratic (DFL)

The 1970 Minnesota Attorney General election was held on November 3, 1970, in order to elect the attorney general of Minnesota. Democratic–Farmer–Labor nominee Warren Spannaus defeated Republican nominee Robert A. Forsythe.

== General election ==
On election day, November 3, 1970, Democratic–Farmer–Labor nominee Warren Spannaus won the election by a margin of 36,089 votes against his opponent Republican nominee Robert A. Forsythe, thereby gaining Democratic–Farmer–Labor Party control over the office of attorney general. Spannaus was sworn in as the 26th attorney general of Minnesota on January 4, 1971.

=== Results ===
Minnesota Attorney General election, 1970
Party	Candidate	Votes	%
Democratic (DFL)	Warren Spannaus	680,479	51.36
Republican	Robert A. Forsythe	644,390	48.64
Total votes		1,324,869	100.00
Democratic (DFL) gain from Republican			
