= Dean Nyquist =

American politician

Mayor of Brooklyn Center, Minnesota
- In office 1978–1990

Member of the Minnesota Senate
- In office 1967–1972

Personal details
- Born: January 24, 1935 Brule, Wisconsin, U.S.
- Died: January 1, 2014 (aged 78) New Hope, Minnesota, U.S.
- Party: Republican
- Spouse: Marie
- Children: 3
- Education: North Dakota State University (BS); William Mitchell College of Law (JD)

Dean A. Nyquist (January 24, 1935 – January 1, 2014) was an American lawyer and politician who served as a member of the Minnesota Senate from 1967 to 1972.

== Early life and education ==
Born in Brule, Wisconsin, Nyquist received his bachelor's degree in electrical engineering from North Dakota State University and his Juris Doctor degree from William Mitchell College of Law (now the Mitchell Hamline School of Law.

== Career ==
After earning his undergraduate degree, he worked as an engineer for Honeywell. He lived in Brooklyn Center, Minnesota and served as mayor of the city from 1978 to 1990. During his tenure as mayor, Nyquist did not accept a salary. He also operated a private legal practice for 20 years. Nyquist served in the Minnesota Senate from 1967 to 1972.

Nyquist was the Republican nominee for Attorney General of Minnesota in 1974, losing to Warren Spannaus.

== Personal life ==
Nyquist and his wife, Marie, were married for 52 years and had three children. Nyquist died on January 1, 2014, in New Hope, Minnesota.

== Notes ==
Party political offices
Preceded by Robert Forsythe	Republican nominee for Attorney General of Minnesota; 1974	Succeeded by Howard A. Knutson
