= 1940 Minnesota Secretary of State election =

- November 5, 1940
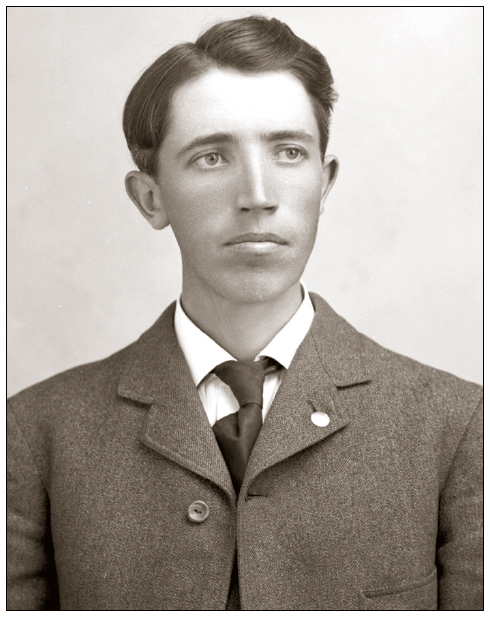

Nominee	Mike Holm	James I. Heller	Austin T. Haley
Party	Republican	Farmer–Labor	Democratic
Popular vote	800,754	230,148	176,195
Percentage	66.34%	19.06%	14.60%
Secretary of State before election
Mike Holm
Republican
Elected Secretary of State
Mike Holm
Republican

The 1940 Minnesota Secretary of State election was held on November 5, 1940, in order to elect the Secretary of State of Minnesota. Republican nominee and incumbent Secretary of State Mike Holm defeated Farmer–Labor nominee James I. Heller and Democratic nominee Austin T. Haley.

== General election ==
On election day, November 5, 1940, Republican nominee Mike Holm won re-election by a margin of 570,606 votes against his foremost opponent Farmer–Labor nominee James I. Heller, thereby retaining Republican control over the office of Secretary of State. Holm was sworn in for his eleventh term on January 6, 1941.

=== Results ===
Minnesota Secretary of State election, 1940
Party	Candidate	Votes	%
Republican	Mike Holm (incumbent)	800,754	66.34
Farmer–Labor	James I. Heller	230,148	19.06
Democratic	Austin T. Haley	176,195	14.60
Total votes		1,207,097	100.00
Republican hold			
