= H. H. Chesterman =

American politician

H.H. Chesterman

15th Minnesota Secretary of State
- In office July 7, 1952 – September 16, 1952
- Governor: C. Elmer Anderson
- Preceded by: Mike Holm
- Succeeded by: Virginia Paul Holm

H.H. Chesterman was an American politician who briefly served as the 15th secretary of state of Minnesota from July to September 1952.

Chesterman, who had served as Assistant Secretary of State under Mike Holm, was appointed to the position in July 1952 by Gov. Elmer Anderson after Holm's death. Chesterman was replaced by Anderson in September of that year; Anderson appointed Virginia Paul Holm, Mike Holm's widow, after public sentiment grew that she should succeed him.

Political offices
Preceded by Mike Holm	Secretary of State of Minnesota; 1952	Succeeded by Virginia Paul Holm
