= 1950 Minnesota Secretary of State election =

- November 7, 1950
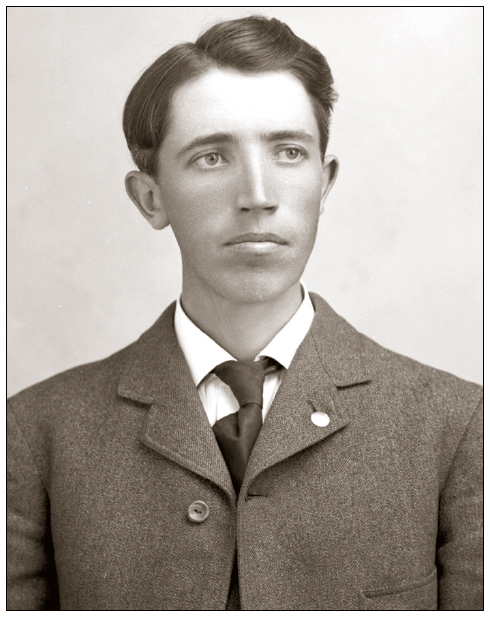

Nominee	Mike Holm	Marie F. McGuire
Party	Republican	Democratic (DFL)
Popular vote	686,364	344,173
Percentage	66.60%	33.40%
- County results Holm: 50-60% 60-70% 70-80% 80-90%
Secretary of State before election
Mike Holm
Republican
Elected Secretary of State
Mike Holm
Republican

The 1950 Minnesota Secretary of State election was held on November 7, 1950, in order to elect the Secretary of State of Minnesota. Republican nominee and incumbent Secretary of State Mike Holm defeated Democratic–Farmer–Labor nominee Marie F. McGuire.

== General election ==
On election day, November 7, 1950, Republican nominee Mike Holm won re-election by a margin of 342,191 votes against his opponent Democratic–Farmer–Labor nominee Marie F. McGuire, thereby retaining Republican control over the office of Secretary of State. Holm was sworn in for his sixteenth term on January 8, 1951.

=== Results ===
Minnesota Secretary of State election, 1950
Party	Candidate	Votes	%
Republican	Mike Holm (incumbent)	686,364	66.60
Democratic (DFL)	Marie F. McGuire	344,173	33.40
Total votes		1,030,537	100.00
Republican hold			
