= 1930 Minnesota Secretary of State election =

- November 4, 1930
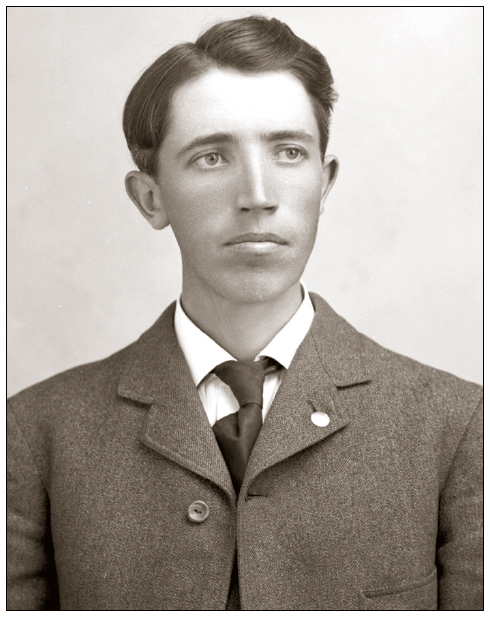

Nominee	Mike Holm	Anna Olson Determan	Mary MacGregor
Party	Republican	Farmer–Labor	Democratic
Popular vote	487,695	209,596	56,535
Percentage	63.66%	27.36%	7.38%
Secretary of State before election
Mike Holm
Republican
Elected Secretary of State
Mike Holm
Republican

The 1930 Minnesota Secretary of State election was held on November 4, 1930, in order to elect the Secretary of State of Minnesota. Republican nominee and incumbent Secretary of State Mike Holm defeated Farmer–Labor nominee Anna Olson Determan, Democratic nominee Mary MacGregor and Communist nominee Henry Bartlett.

== General election ==
On election day, November 4, 1930, Republican nominee Mike Holm won re-election by a margin of 278,099 votes against his foremost opponent Farmer–Labor nominee Anna Olson Determan, thereby retaining Republican control over the office of Secretary of State. Holm was sworn in for his sixth term on January 3, 1931.

=== Results ===
Minnesota Secretary of State election, 1930
Party	Candidate	Votes	%
Republican	Mike Holm (incumbent)	487,695	63.66
Farmer–Labor	Anna Olson Determan	209,596	27.36
Democratic	Mary MacGregor	56,535	7.38
Communist	Henry Bartlett	12,326	1.60
Total votes		766,152	100.00
Republican hold			
