= 1936 Minnesota Secretary of State election =

- November 3, 1936
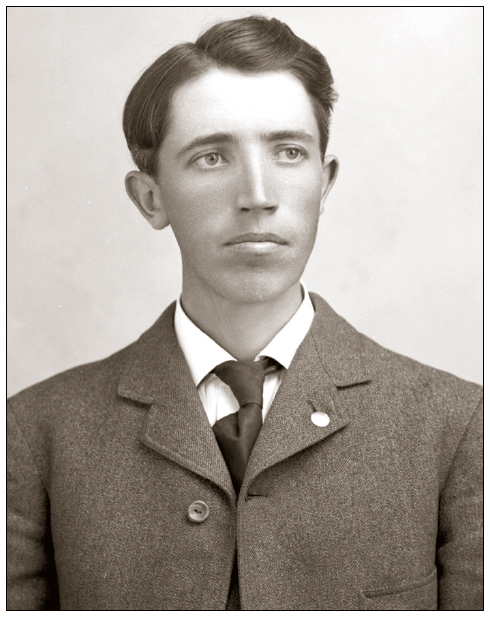

Nominee	Mike Holm	Paul C. Hartig	Carl Hennemann
Party	Republican	Farmer–Labor	Democratic
Popular vote	545,965	426,668	113,217
Percentage	50.11%	39.16%	10.39%
- County results Holm: 40–50% 50–60% 60–70% Hartig: 40–50% 50–60%
Secretary of State before election
Mike Holm
Republican
Elected Secretary of State
Mike Holm
Republican

The 1936 Minnesota Secretary of State election was held on November 3, 1936, in order to elect the Secretary of State of Minnesota. Republican nominee and incumbent Secretary of State Mike Holm defeated Farmer–Labor nominee Paul C. Hartig, Democratic nominee Hugh T. Kennedy and Socialist nominee Vincent R. Dunne.

== General election ==
On election day, November 3, 1936, Republican nominee Mike Holm won re-election by a margin of 119,297 votes against his foremost opponent Farmer–Labor nominee Paul C. Hartig, thereby retaining Republican control over the office of Secretary of State. Holm was sworn in for his ninth term on January 4, 1937.

=== Results ===
Minnesota Secretary of State election, 1936
Party	Candidate	Votes	%
Republican	Mike Holm (incumbent)	545,965	50.11
Farmer–Labor	Paul C. Hartig	426,668	39.16
Democratic	Carl Hennemann	113,217	10.39
Socialist	Vincent R. Dunne	3,722	0.34
Total votes		1,089,572	100.00
Republican hold			
