= Feminist Caucus of the Minnesota Democratic–Farmer–Labor Party =

- Chairperson: Alicia Gibson
- Founder: Koryne Horbal
- Founded: April 1973
- Split from: DFL Women’s Caucus
- Ideology: Feminism
- Regional affiliation: Minnesota DFL

Website
- https://www.dflfeminist.org/

The Feminist Caucus of the Minnesota Democratic–Farmer–Labor Party (DFL Feminist Caucus or DFLFC) is an caucus within the Minnesota DFL made of feminists.

== History ==
In 1971, State Chair Koryne Horbal published a report titled “Women in the DFL: Present but Powerless.” Horbal was the only woman in the party at that time with any significant political power. The existing DFL Women's Caucus was willing to fight for women's issues, however did not fight for the expansion of women's rights and role in government.

The DFLFC was founded by Horbal along with Mary Pattock Bremer, Cynthia Kitlinski, Yvette Oldendorf, Jeri Rasmussen, and Peggy Specktor in April of 1973. They would become known as the 'founding mothers'. The caucus immediately earned many members, including Joan Growe, Phyllis Kahn, Linda Berglin, and Mark Dayton. In 1974, Horbal delivered the first 'feminist state of the state' address. The caucus helped elect Joan Growe as Minnesota Secretary of State in 1975 and Rosalie Wahl as the first female justice on the Minnesota Supreme Court in 1977. In 1975, Hubert Humphrey spoke to the caucus about his support for the caucus-supported Equal Rights Amendment.

The caucus was a prominent force in the election of Sharon Sayles Belton, Marlene Johnson, and Sandy Pappas. In 2008, the DFLFC endorsed Al Franken.

In 2018, the caucus broke ties with Rick Nolan after he failed to take action regarding one of his aide's sexual misconduct allegations.
