= 1944 Minnesota Secretary of State election =

- November 7, 1944
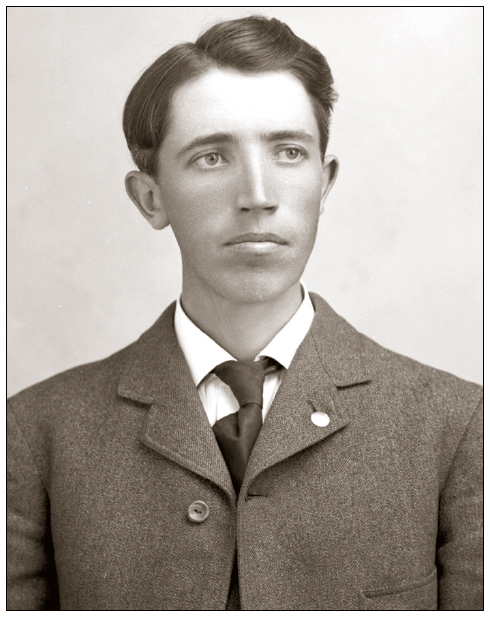

Nominee	Mike Holm	Emily Kneubuhl
Party	Republican	Democratic (DFL)
Popular vote	784,424	342,342
Percentage	69.62%	30.38%
- County results Holm: 50-60% 60-70% 70-80% 80-90%
Secretary of State before election
Mike Holm
Republican
Elected Secretary of State
Mike Holm
Republican

The 1944 Minnesota Secretary of State election was held on November 7, 1944, in order to elect the Secretary of State of Minnesota. Republican nominee and incumbent Secretary of State Mike Holm defeated Democratic–Farmer–Labor nominee Emily Kneubuhl.

== General election ==
On election day, November 7, 1944, Republican nominee Mike Holm won re-election by a margin of 442,082 votes against his opponent Democratic–Farmer–Labor nominee Emily Kneubuhl, thereby retaining Republican control over the office of Secretary of State. Holm was sworn in for his thirteenth term on January 2, 1945.

=== Results ===
Minnesota Secretary of State election, 1944
Party	Candidate	Votes	%
Republican	Mike Holm (incumbent)	784,424	69.62
Democratic (DFL)	Emily Kneubuhl	342,342	30.38
Total votes		1,126,766	100.00
Republican hold			
