= 1942 Minnesota Secretary of State election =

- November 3, 1942
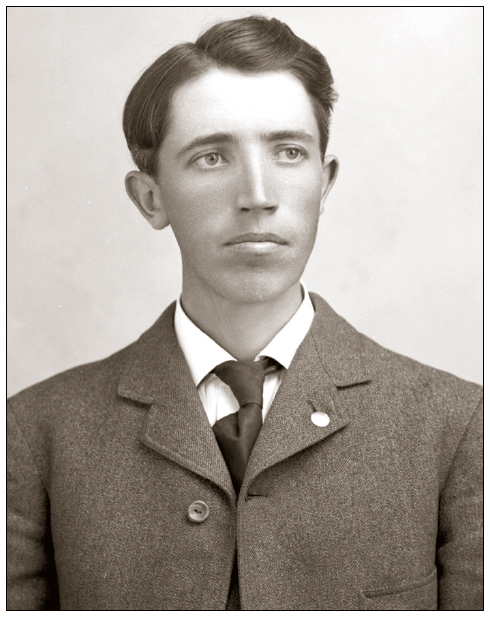

Nominee	Mike Holm	Daniel D. Collins	Austin T. Haley
Party	Republican	Farmer–Labor	Democratic
Popular vote	555,918	146,825	67,222
Percentage	72.20%	19.07%	8.73%
Secretary of State before election
Mike Holm
Republican
Elected Secretary of State
Mike Holm
Republican

The 1942 Minnesota Secretary of State election was held on November 3, 1942, in order to elect the Secretary of State of Minnesota. Republican nominee and incumbent Secretary of State Mike Holm defeated Farmer–Labor nominee Daniel D. Collins and Democratic nominee Austin T. Haley.

== General election ==
On election day, November 3, 1942, Republican nominee Mike Holm won re-election by a margin of 409,093 votes against his foremost opponent Farmer–Labor nominee Daniel D. Collins, thereby retaining Republican control over the office of Secretary of State. Holm was sworn in for his twelfth term on January 4, 1943.

=== Results ===
Minnesota Secretary of State election, 1942
Party	Candidate	Votes	%
Republican	Mike Holm (incumbent)	555,918	72.20
Farmer–Labor	Daniel D. Collins	146,825	19.07
Democratic	Austin T. Haley	67,222	8.73
Total votes		769,965	100.00
Republican hold			
