= 1920 Minnesota Secretary of State election =

- November 2, 1920
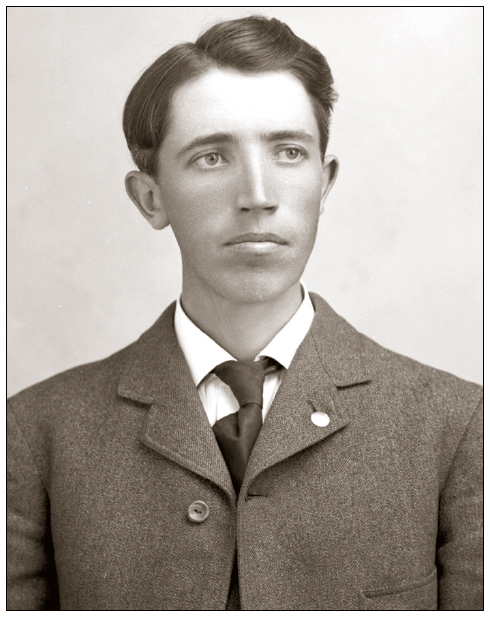

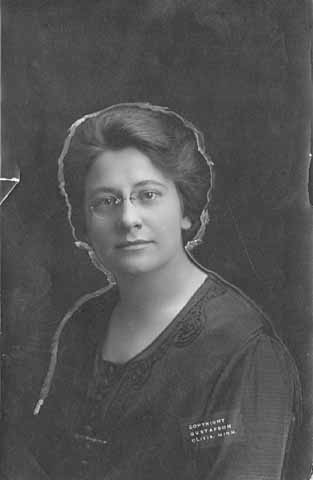

Nominee	Mike Holm	Lily J. Anderson	Frank C. Burmaster
Party	Republican	Farmer–Labor	Democratic
Popular vote	434,130	193,658	79,941
Percentage	59.12%	26.37%	10.89%
Secretary of State before election
Julius A. Schmahl
Republican
Elected Secretary of State
Mike Holm
Republican

The 1920 Minnesota Secretary of State election was held on November 2, 1920, in order to elect the Secretary of State of Minnesota. Republican nominee Mike Holm defeated Farmer–Labor nominee Lily J. Anderson, Democratic nominee Frank C. Burmaster, Socialist nominee John H. Hirt and National nominee John M. Copeland.

== General election ==
On election day, November 2, 1920, Republican nominee Mike Holm won the election by a margin of 240,472 votes against his foremost opponent Farmer–Labor nominee Lily J. Anderson, thereby retaining Republican control over the office of Secretary of State. Holm was sworn in as the 14th Minnesota Secretary of State on January 3, 1921.

=== Results ===
Minnesota Secretary of State election, 1920
Party	Candidate	Votes	%
Republican	Mike Holm	434,130	59.12
Farmer–Labor	Lily J. Anderson	193,658	26.37
Democratic	Frank C. Burmaster	79,941	10.89
Socialist	John H. Hirt	18,965	2.58
National	John M. Copeland	7,608	1.04
Total votes		734,302	100.00
Republican hold			
