= 1938 Minnesota Secretary of State election =

- November 8, 1938
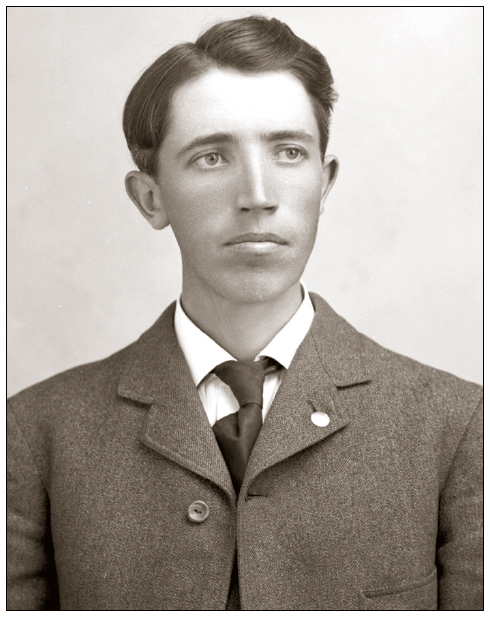

| Nominee | Mike Holm | Paul A. Rasmussen | Hugh T. Kennedy |
| Party | Republican | Farmer–Labor | Democratic |
| Popular vote | 690,312 | 328,474 | 83,298 |
| Percentage | 62.64% | 29.81% | 7.55% |
Secretary of State before election
Mike Holm
Republican
Elected Secretary of State
Mike Holm
Republican

The 1938 Minnesota Secretary of State election was held on November 8, 1938, in order to elect the Secretary of State of Minnesota. Republican nominee and incumbent Secretary of State Mike Holm defeated Farmer–Labor nominee Paul A. Rasmussen and Democratic nominee Hugh T. Kennedy.

== General election ==
On election day, November 8, 1938, Republican nominee Mike Holm won re-election by a margin of 361,838 votes against his foremost opponent Farmer–Labor nominee Paul A. Rasmussen, thereby retaining Republican control over the office of Secretary of State. Holm was sworn in for his tenth term on January 2, 1939.

=== Results ===
Minnesota Secretary of State election, 1938
| Party | Candidate | Votes | % |
|---|---|---|---|
| Republican | Mike Holm (incumbent) | 690,312 | 62.64 |
| Farmer–Labor | Paul A. Rasmussen | 328,474 | 29.81 |
| Democratic | Hugh T. Kennedy | 83,298 | 7.55 |
| Total votes | | 1,102,084 | 100.00 |
| Republican hold | | | |
