= 1948 Minnesota Secretary of State election =

- November 2, 1948
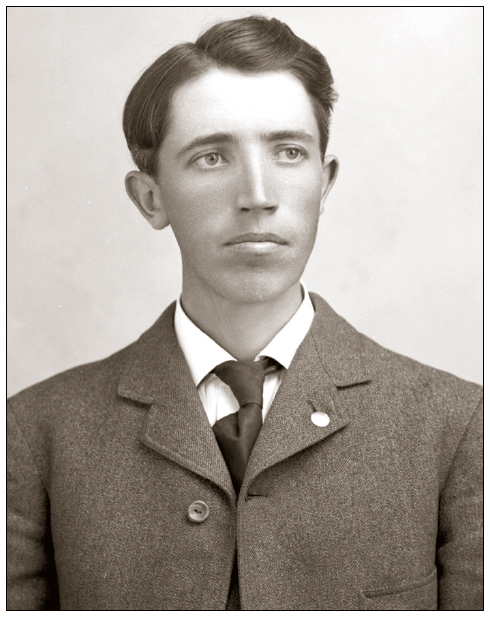

Nominee	Mike Holm	Koscie H. Marsh
Party	Republican	Democratic (DFL)
Popular vote	746,678	447,028
Percentage	62.55%	37.45%
- County results Holm: 50-60% 60-70% 70-80% 80-90% Marsh: 50-60%
Secretary of State before election
Mike Holm
Republican
Elected Secretary of State
Mike Holm
Republican

The 1948 Minnesota Secretary of State election was held on November 2, 1948, in order to elect the Secretary of State of Minnesota. Republican nominee and incumbent Secretary of State Mike Holm defeated Democratic–Farmer–Labor nominee Koscie H. Marsh.

== General election ==
On election day, November 2, 1948, Republican nominee Mike Holm won re-election by a margin of 299,650 votes against his opponent Democratic–Farmer–Labor nominee Koscie H. Marsh, thereby retaining Republican control over the office of Secretary of State. Holm was sworn in for his fifteenth term on January 3, 1949.

=== Results ===
Minnesota Secretary of State election, 1948
Party	Candidate	Votes	%
Republican	Mike Holm (incumbent)	746,678	62.55
Democratic (DFL)	Koscie H. Marsh	447,028	37.45
Total votes		1,193,706	100.00
Republican hold			
