= Howard A. Knutson =

American lawyer and politician

Howard A. Knutson (May 16, 1929 – October 1, 2006) was an American lawyer and politician.

Knutson was born in Grand Forks, North Dakota and grew up in Glencoe, Minnesota with his family. He served in the United States Army from 1951 to 1953. Knutson graduated from Luther College, in Decorah, Iowa, in 1951, and from William Mitchell College of Law in 1959. He lived in Burnsville, Minnesota with his wife and family and practiced law in Burnsville. Knutson served in the Minnesota House of Representatives from 1967 to 1982 and in the Minnesota Senate from 1973 to 1990. He was a Republican. Knutson died from Alzheimer's disease and from cancer at his home in Burnsville, Minnesota. His son David Knutson also served in the Minnesota Legislature.

Howard A. Knutson
House:
1967-72 (District 12B)
Senate:
Senate 1973-82 (District 53)
Senate 1983-90 (District 38)
Municipal Board/Commission:
Burnsville, Minnesota (City Industrial Planning Commission)
Military:
United States Army; 1951 to 1953
Personal details
Born	16 May 1929 Grand Forks, North Dakota
Died	1 October 2006
Political party	Republican Party

== Notes ==
Party political offices
Preceded by Dean Nyquist	Republican nominee for Attorney General of Minnesota; 1978	Succeeded by Elliot C. Rothenberg
