= Minnesota Democratic–Farmer–Labor Party =

Minnesota affiliate of the Democratic Party

- Abbreviation: DFL
- Chairperson: Richard Carlbom
- Governor: Tim Walz
- Lieutenant governor: Peggy Flanagan
- Senate President: Bobby Joe Champion
- Senate Leader: Erin Murphy
- House Leader: Zack Stephenson
- Founded: April 15, 1944; 82 years ago
- Merger of: Minnesota Democratic Party and Minnesota Farmer–Labor Party
- Headquarters: 255 Plato Boulevard East; Saint Paul, Minnesota
- Youth wing: Minnesota Young DFL (MYDFL)
- Ideology: Liberalism; Progressivism; Populism
- Political position: Center-left
- National affiliation: Democratic Party
- Colors: Blue
- State Senate: 39 / 67
- State House: 77 / 134
- Statewide Executive Offices: 5 / 5
- U.S. Senate: 2 / 2
- U.S. House of Representatives: 4 / 8

Election symbol

Website
- dfl.org

The Minnesota Democratic–Farmer–Labor Party (DFL) is a political party in the U.S. state of Minnesota affiliated with the national Democratic Party. It was formed by a merger between the Minnesota Democratic Party and the Minnesota Farmer–Labor Party in 1944. The DFL is one of two state Democratic Party affiliates with a different name than the national party, the other being the neighboring North Dakota Democratic–Nonpartisan League Party.

The DFL controls four of Minnesota's eight United States House of Representatives seats, both of its United States Senate seats, the Minnesota Senate, and all other statewide offices, including the governor of Minnesota, making it the dominant party in the state. In the Minnesota House of Representatives, it has a power-sharing agreement with its main political rival, the Republican Party of Minnesota, following a tie in the 2024 Minnesota House of Representatives election.

== History ==
=== Background ===
The progressive movement in Minnesota following the American Civil War was initially contained within the Minnesota Republican Party. However, by the 1880s, the Republican party became less receptive to progressive reform. The Farmer's Alliance and Knights of Labor, rising in political power, initially attempted to bring progressivism to the Minnesota Democratic party during the 1886 gubernatorial campaign of A. A. Ames. After his defeat, the Farmer's Alliance and Knights of Labor failed to regain influence within either the Republican or Democratic parties. In 1890, the Farmer's Alliance organized the campaign of Sidney M. Owen as a third-party candidate. Despite Owen's electoral failure, the Farmer's Alliance secured enough of a voting base that in 1892, they joined with the Populists, who were able to outperform the Democrats. In 1896, a fusion ticket with the Democrats was created, headed by John Lind. On his second gubernatorial run in 1898, the fusion ticket was successful. However, Lind would only serve one term. In 1902, the fusion was broken, and the poor performance of the Populists would be the end of the party. Progressives continued to dominate the Democratic party for the rest of the decade, before slowly losing influence.

The Nonpartisan League (NPL), founded in North Dakota in 1915, was an agrarian party focused on farmer grievances against corporate monopolies. It expanded to Minnesota in 1917, and in 1918 it merged with the Duluth Union Labor Party to create the Farmer–Labor Party (FLP).

During the 1930s, the FLP gained support for radical platforms aimed at addressing economic and social inequalities. The party won the 1930 gubernatorial election under Floyd B. Olson. During this decade, Democrats had minimal success in the state, as the FLP effectively captured the left-wing vote and drew support away from urban workers, rural farmers, and immigrants. The party often won only single digits in statewide races as the FLP aligned informally with Roosevelt's New Deal coalition.

Following Olson's death in 1936, Hjalmar Petersen became governor until the inauguration of Elmer Benson. Olson was the unifying figure in the party, and both Benson and Petersen claimed to be his successor. In 1938, Petersen and Benson ran against each other in the primary. Benson led the radical wing, while Petersen led the more moderate leftist wing. Benson won the primary. Benson's former Wisconsin political allies Governor Philip La Follette and Senator Robert M. La Follette Jr. broke with him. La Follette sought to unite the Farmer–Labor party with the Wisconsin Progressive Party into the National Progressives of America, with candidates already slated in Iowa. Benson rejected the union, resulting in the collapse of relations between the two and causing internal conflict within the regional political parties. Following Benson's defeat in the general election, Petersen's faction dominated the FLP. The party suffered further setbacks in 1940 and 1942, losing congressional seats. Petersen failed twice to recapture the governor's office.

=== Establishment ===
On April 15, 1944, the Farmer–Labor Party merged with the Minnesota Democratic Party, forming the Democratic–Farmer–Labor Party (DFL). Leading the merger effort were Elmer Kelm, the head of the Minnesota Democratic Party and the founding chairman of the DFL, and Elmer Benson, who had re-taken control of the FLP from Hjalmar Petersen following Petersen's electoral defeats in 1940 and 1942. Rising star Hubert H. Humphrey chaired the Fusion Committee, which accomplished the union, and went on to chair its first state convention.

=== Early years ===
The early DFL confronted various social issues, including antisemitism, the beginnings of the Civil rights movement, and economic justice, influenced significantly by Minnesota's small but politically active African American communities. In early 1946, as a Fair Employment Practice (FEPC) bill was moving through Congress, there was a surge of civil rights activism in the Twin Cities.

Factional battles were intensified by differing views on how to address the left-wing influence within the party, with significant conflicts between proponents of Henry A. Wallace's progressive policies and the more moderate wing led by figures like Hubert Humphrey. By the party's second convention in 1946, tensions had re-emerged between members of the two former parties. While the majority of delegates supported left-wing policies, Humphrey managed to install a more conservative, anti-communist ally, Orville Freeman, as party secretary. Some disaffected Farmer–Labor leaders such as Benson moved to the Progressive Party.

=== Recent history ===
Freeman was elected the state's first DFL governor in 1954. Important members of the party have included Humphrey and Walter Mondale, who each went on to be United States senators, vice presidents, and unsuccessful Democratic nominees for president; Eugene McCarthy, a U.S. senator who ran for the Democratic presidential nomination in 1968 as an anti-Vietnam War candidate; Paul Wellstone, a U.S. senator from 1991 to 2002 who became an icon of populist progressivism; Amy Klobuchar, a U.S. senator who ran for the Democratic nomination for president in 2020; Dean Phillips, a U.S. representative who ran for the Democratic nomination for president in 2024; and Tim Walz, two-term incumbent governor chosen as Kamala Harris' running mate in the 2024 presidential election.

The DFL had varied success beginning in the late 1970s and through the late 2010s, in part due to the growth of single-issue splinter groups after reforms brought by the national party.

Following the 2022 Minnesota elections, the DFL became the dominant party in the state, retaining every executive office, winning majorities in the state House and Senate, and re-electing all incumbent congressional representatives. With their newly elected trifecta, the DFL pursued a progressive agenda in their first legislative session. Governor Tim Walz described the session as "the most successful legislative session, certainly in many of our lifetimes and maybe in Minnesota history." The newly elected government passed large expansions in welfare programs and spending. Notable policies passed include the expansion of abortion rights, new programs to provide reproductive healthcare, protection of gender affirming care, the legalization of recreational cannabis, indexing education spending to inflation, investments in public transit, and paid sick leave for Minnesota workers. Former president Barack Obama praised the state government's actions, saying that "Minnesota has made progress on a whole host of issues – from protecting abortion rights and new gun safety measures to expanding access to the ballot and reducing child poverty. These laws will make a real difference in the lives of Minnesotans." The trifecta was broken with a split legislature following the 2024 Minnesota elections.

== Party organization ==
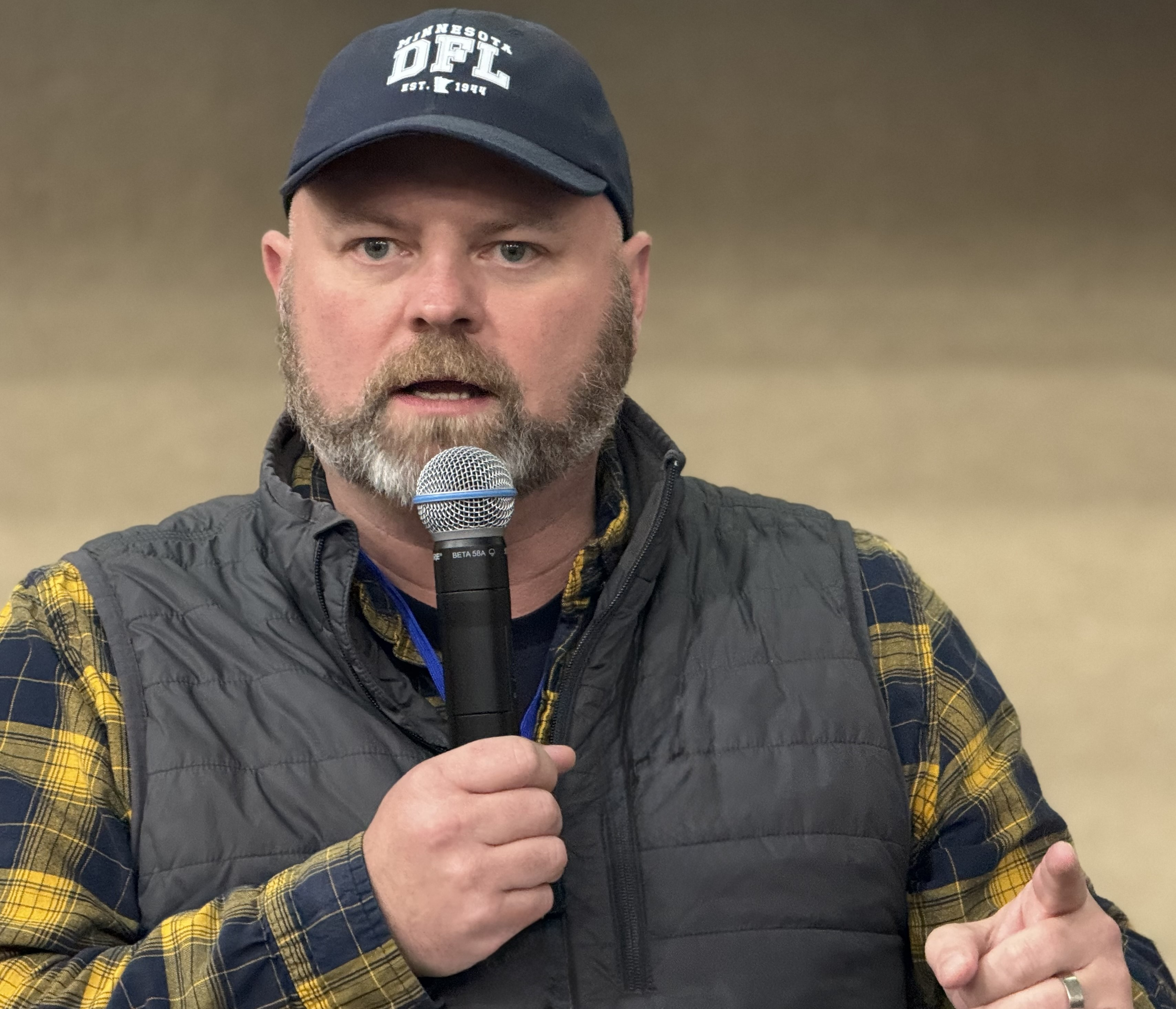
DFL chair Richard Carlbom in 2026

The DFL is governed by a state central committee composed of representatives from each of the state's congressional districts. The state central committee is responsible for setting the party's platform, electing party officers, and conducting other party business. The DFL also has a constitution and bylaws that govern its operations.

=== Community caucuses ===
The party operates several community caucuses that organize and represent different communities within Minnesota; they are not defined geographically. These include the:

- African American Caucus, which organizes African Americans.
- Asian Pacific American Caucus, which organizes Asian Americans and Pacific Islander Americans.
- Disability Caucus, which advocates for Minnesotans with disabilities.
- Environmental Caucus, which advocates for environmental protection and sustainability.
- Feminist Caucus, which advocates for feminist and women's issues.
- Hmong American Caucus, which organizes Hmong Americans, the largest Asian American group in Minnesota.
- Latino Caucus (Spanish: Movimiento) which organizes Latino Americans.
- Minnesota Young DFL, which organizes young people.
- Muslim Caucus, which organizes Muslims, who make up between 1–2% of the state.
- Native People's Caucus, which organizes and supports Native Americans and tribal communities.
- Progressive Caucus, which advocates for progressive policies and opposes "corporate money in politics".
- Rural Caucus, which supports the state's rural communities.
- Senior Caucus, which advocates for the interests of senior citizens.
- Somali American Caucus, which organizes Somali Americans, who make up over 1% of the state's population.
- Stonewall DFL, which organizes LGBTQ+ Minnesotans.
- Veterans Caucus, which organizes veterans and their families.

== Voter base ==
The DFL's base of support is diverse, and it includes urban and suburban voters, working class voters, labor unions, environmentalists, and other progressive groups. The party has a strong presence in the Twin Cities metropolitan area. The DFL has lost support in traditional DFL strongholds such as the Iron Range since 2016.

== Current elected officials ==
=== Members of Congress ===
==== U.S. Senate ====
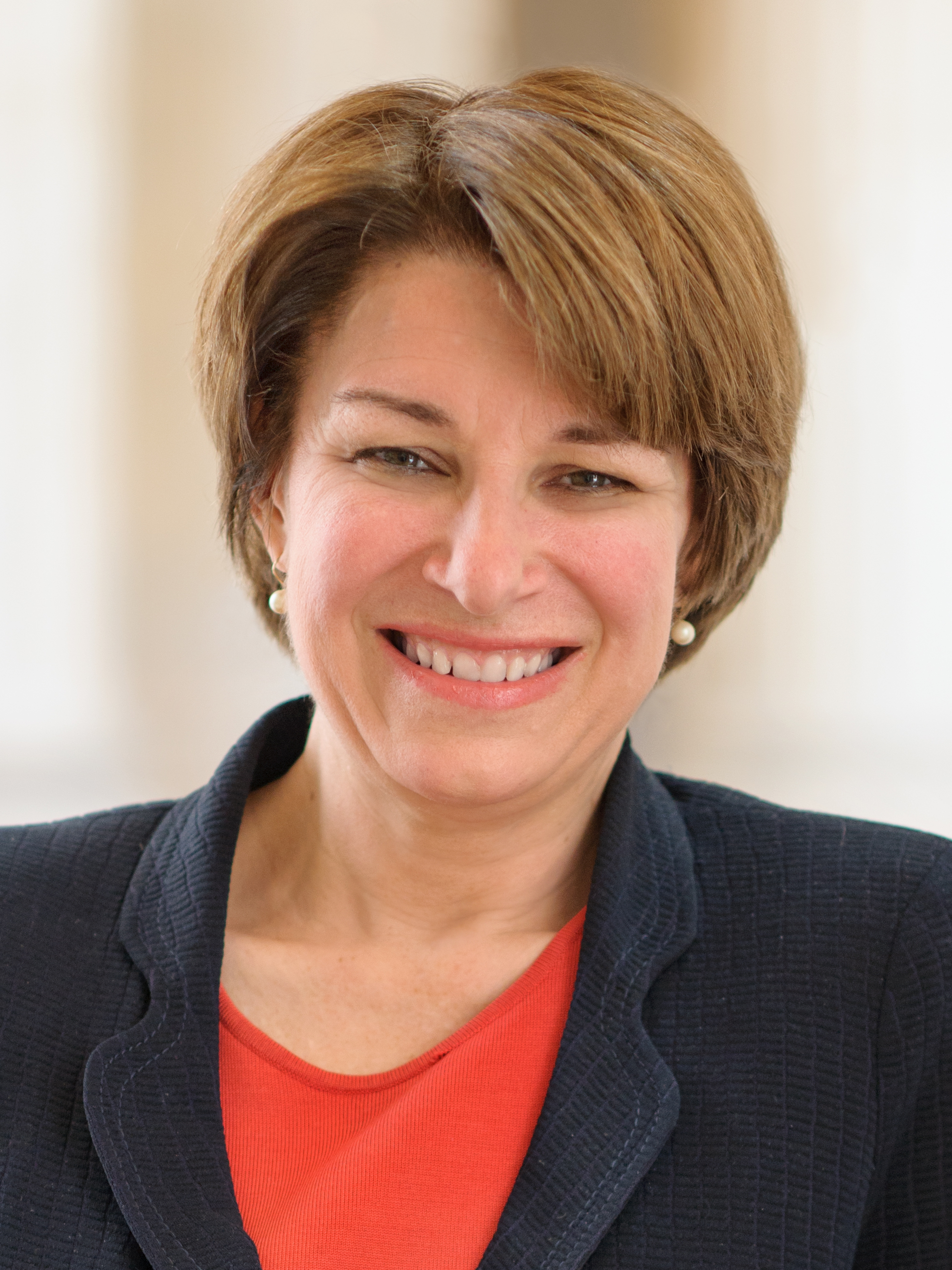
Senior U.S. Senator Amy Klobuchar

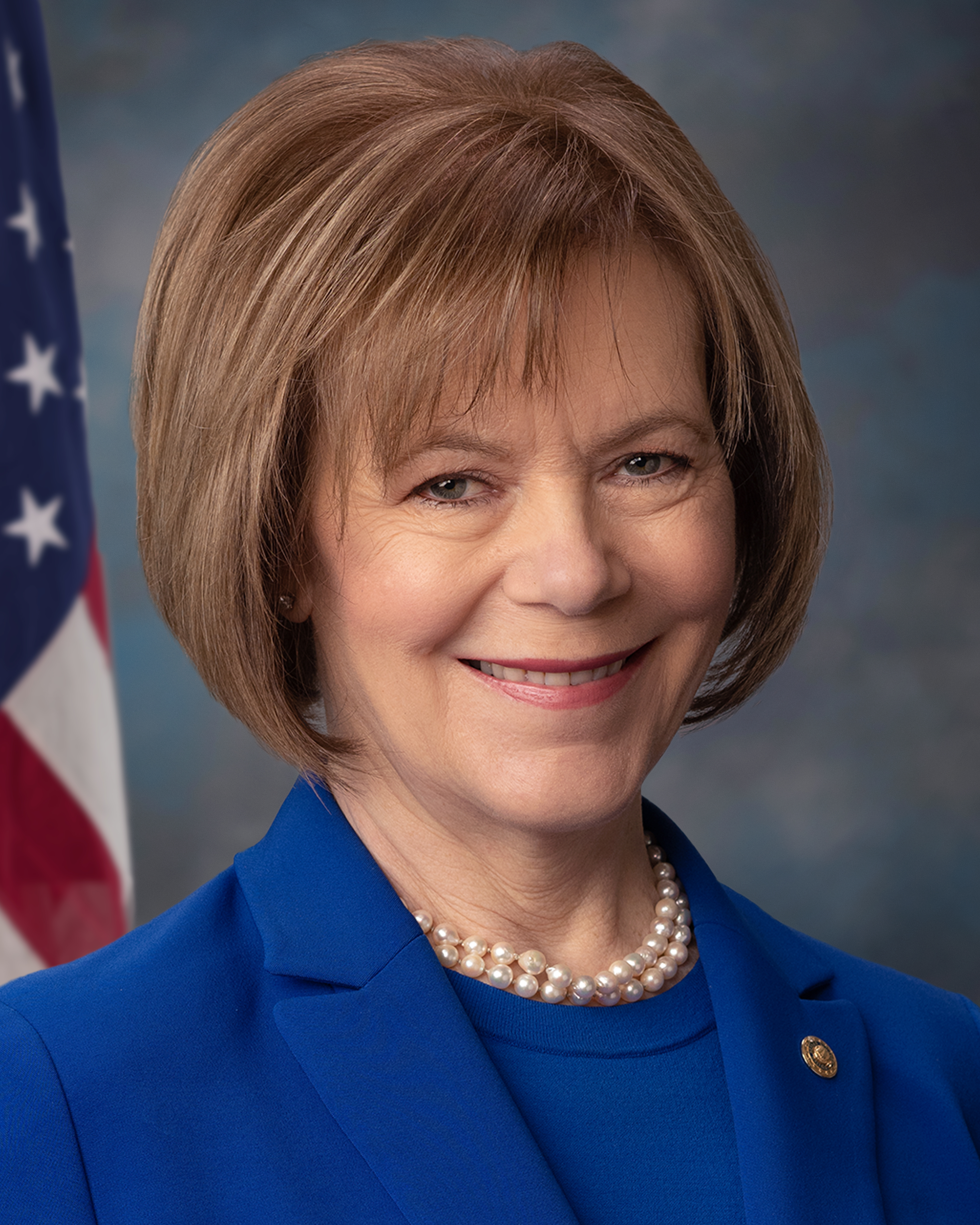
Junior U.S. Senator Tina Smith

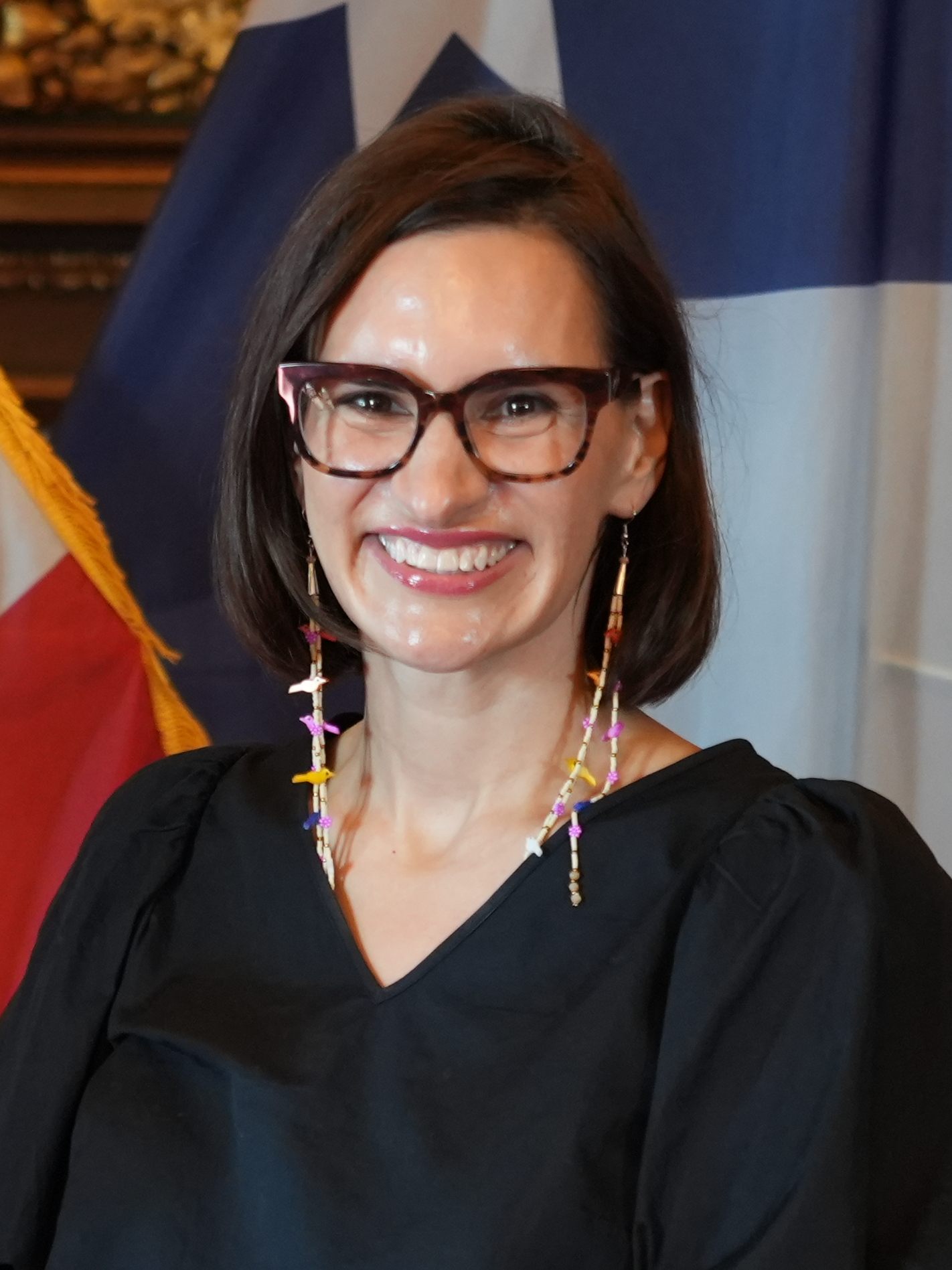
Pre-junior U.S. Senator-elect Peggy Flanagan

==== U.S. House of Representatives ====
Out of the eight seats Minnesota is apportioned in the U.S. House of Representatives, four are held by members of the DFL.

District	Member	Photo
1st	Jake Johnson (elect)	
2nd	Angie Craig	
2nd	Matt Little (elect)	
3rd	Kelly Morrison	
4th	Betty McCollum	
5th	Ilhan Omar	

=== Statewide ===
- Governor: Tim Walz → Amy Klobuchar (elect)
- Lieutenant Governor: Peggy Flanagan → Ben Schierer (elect)
- Secretary of State: Steve Simon
- State Auditor: Julie Blaha → Zack Filipovich (elect)
- Attorney General: Keith Ellison
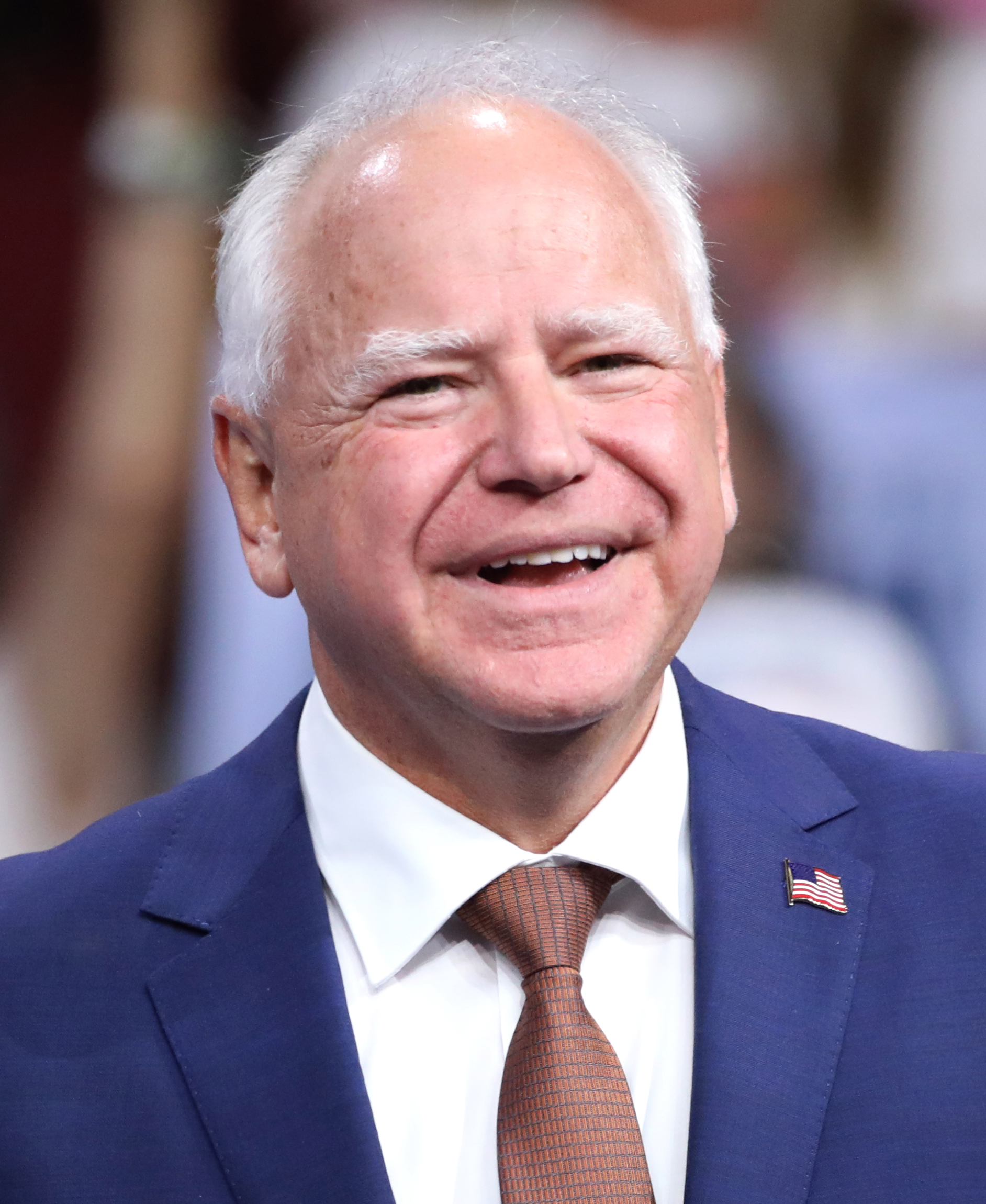
Tim Walz

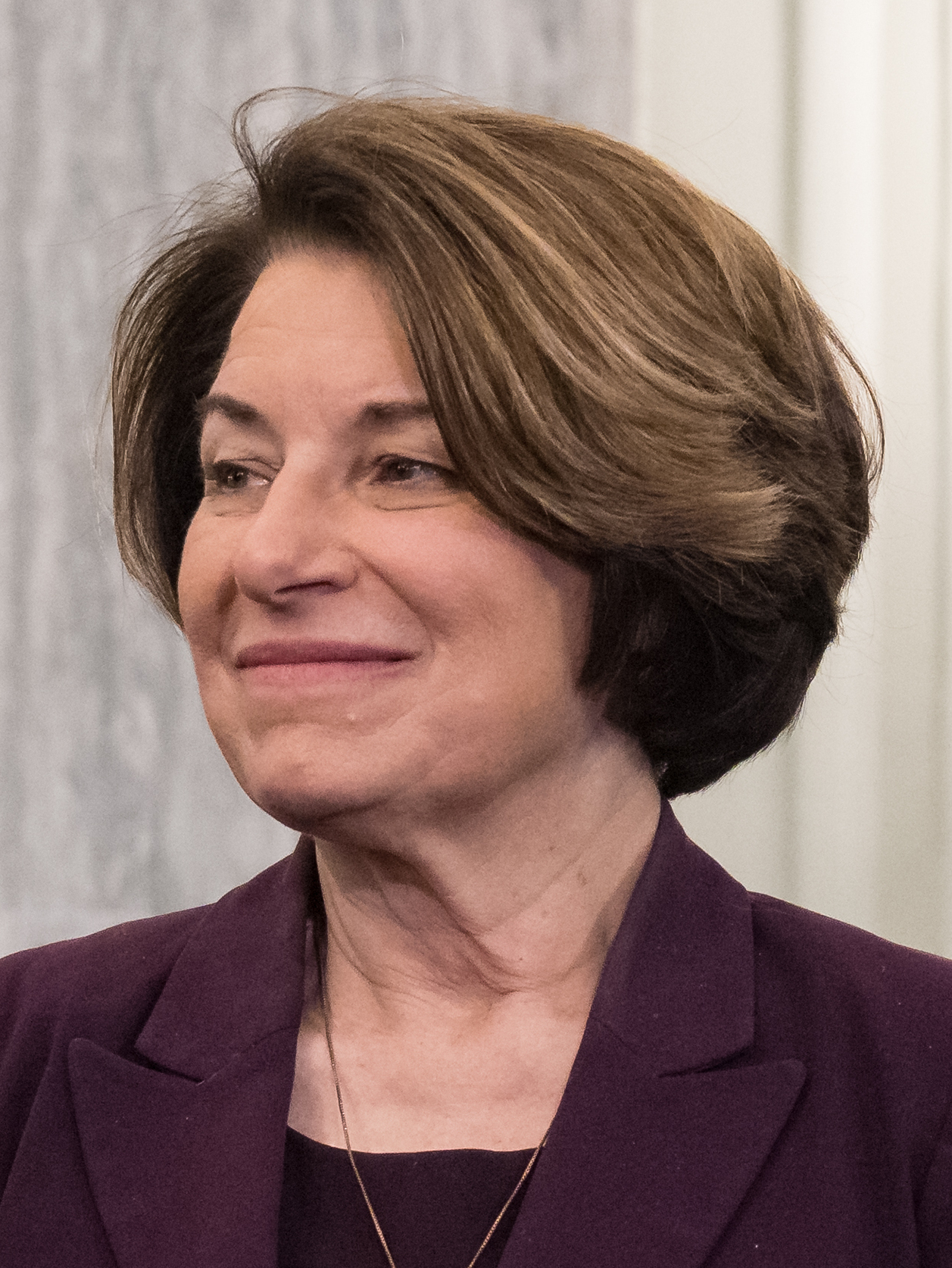
Amy Klobuchar

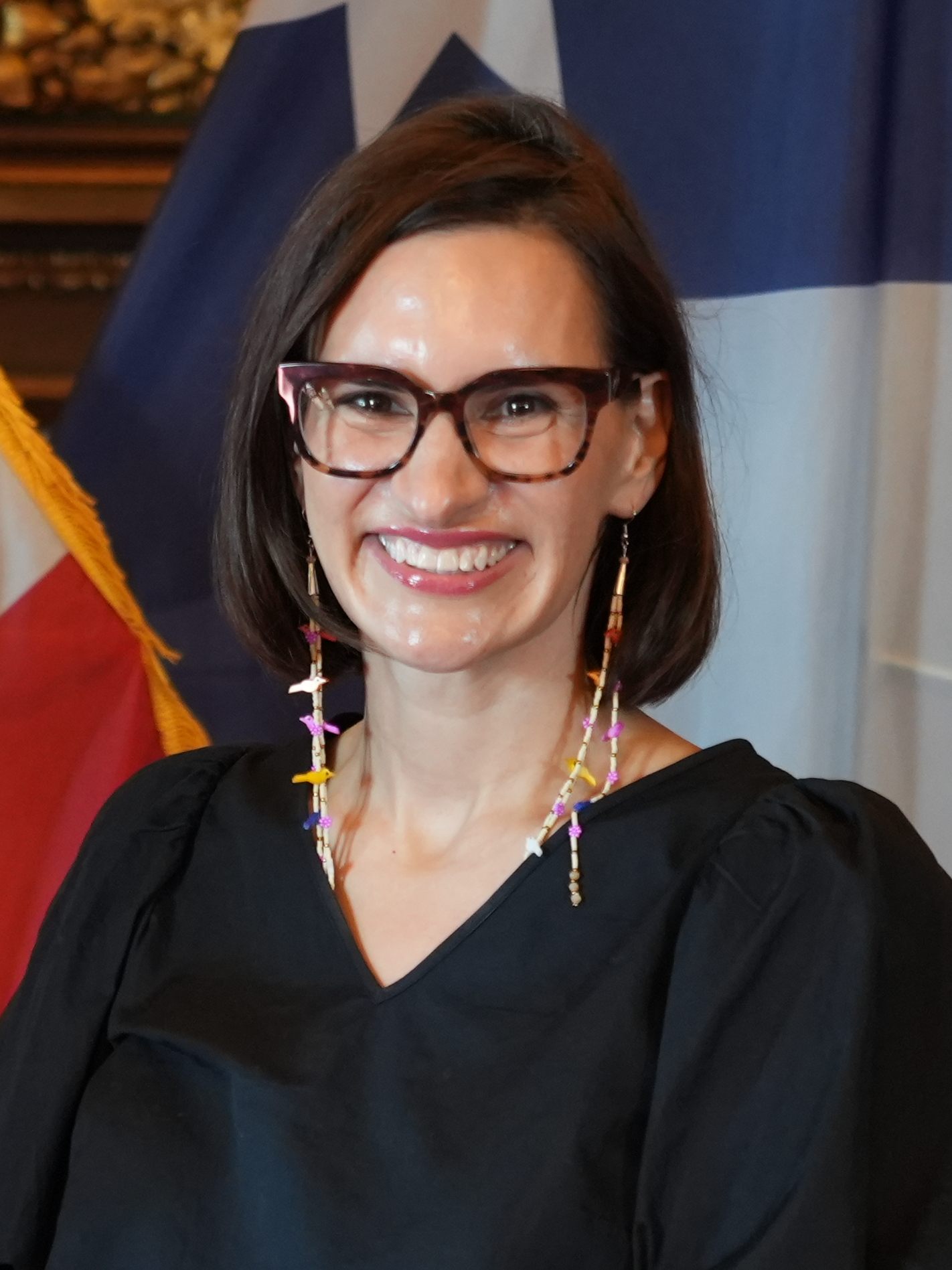
Peggy Flanagan

Ben Schierer

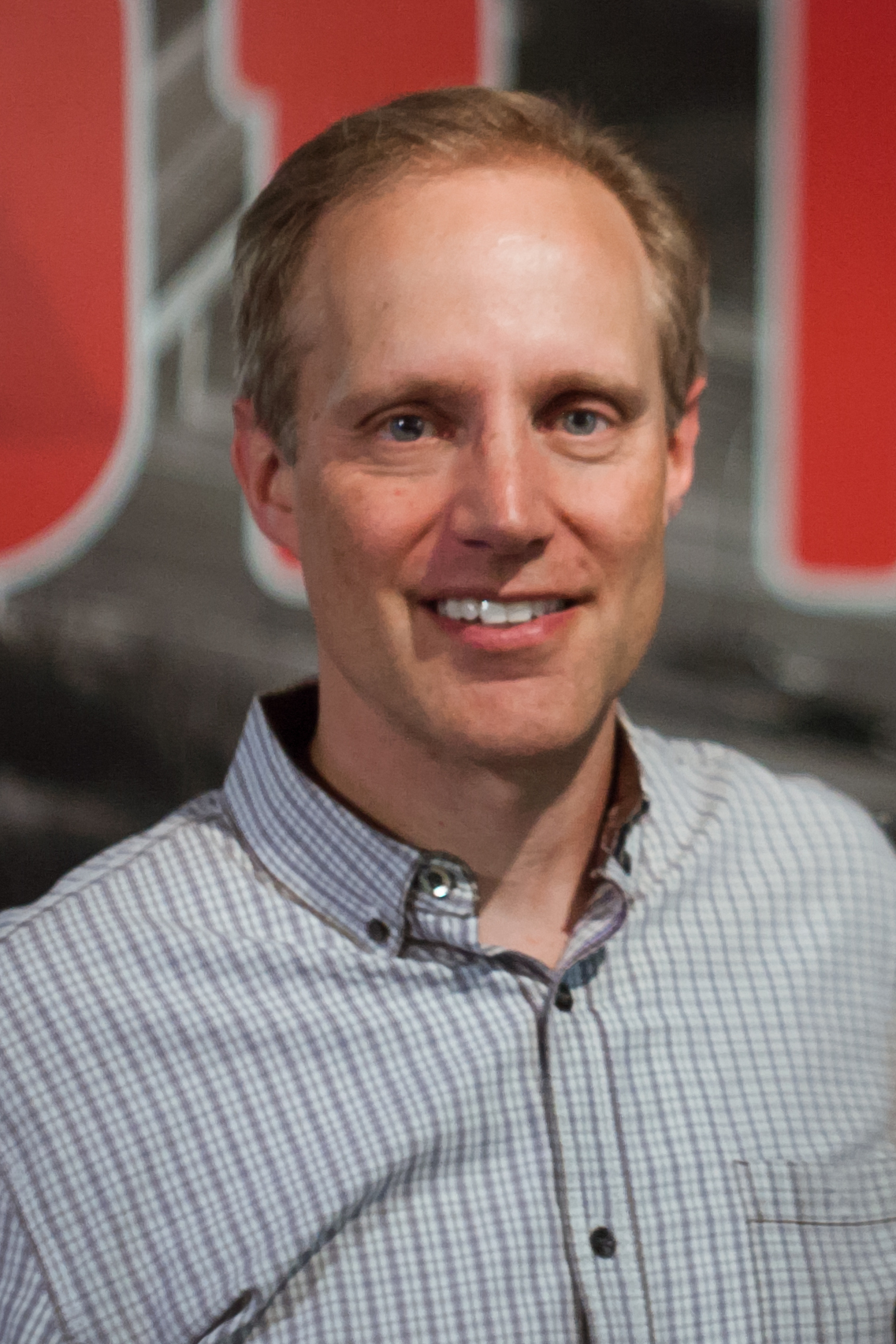
Steve Simon

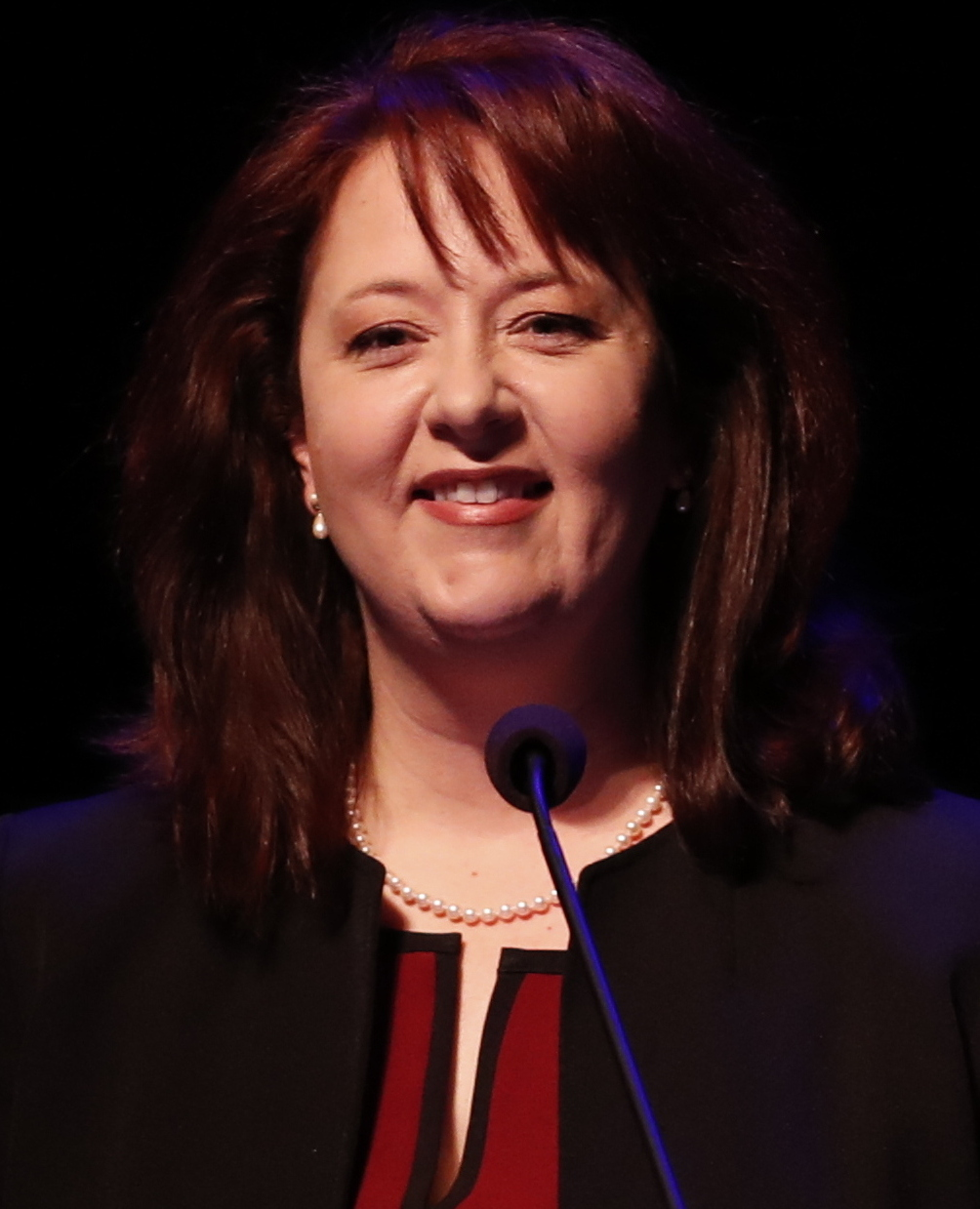
Julie Blaha

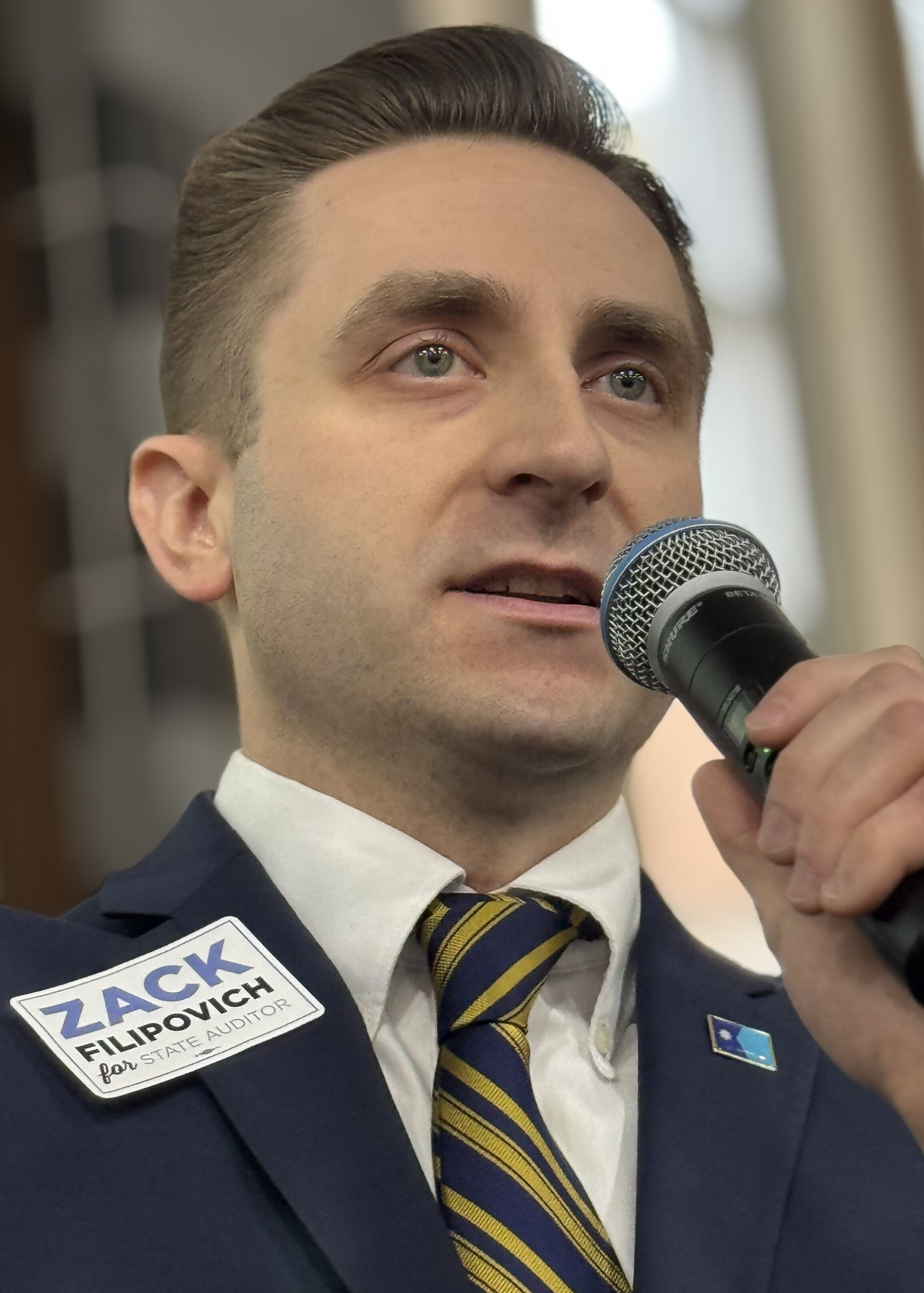
Zack Filipovich

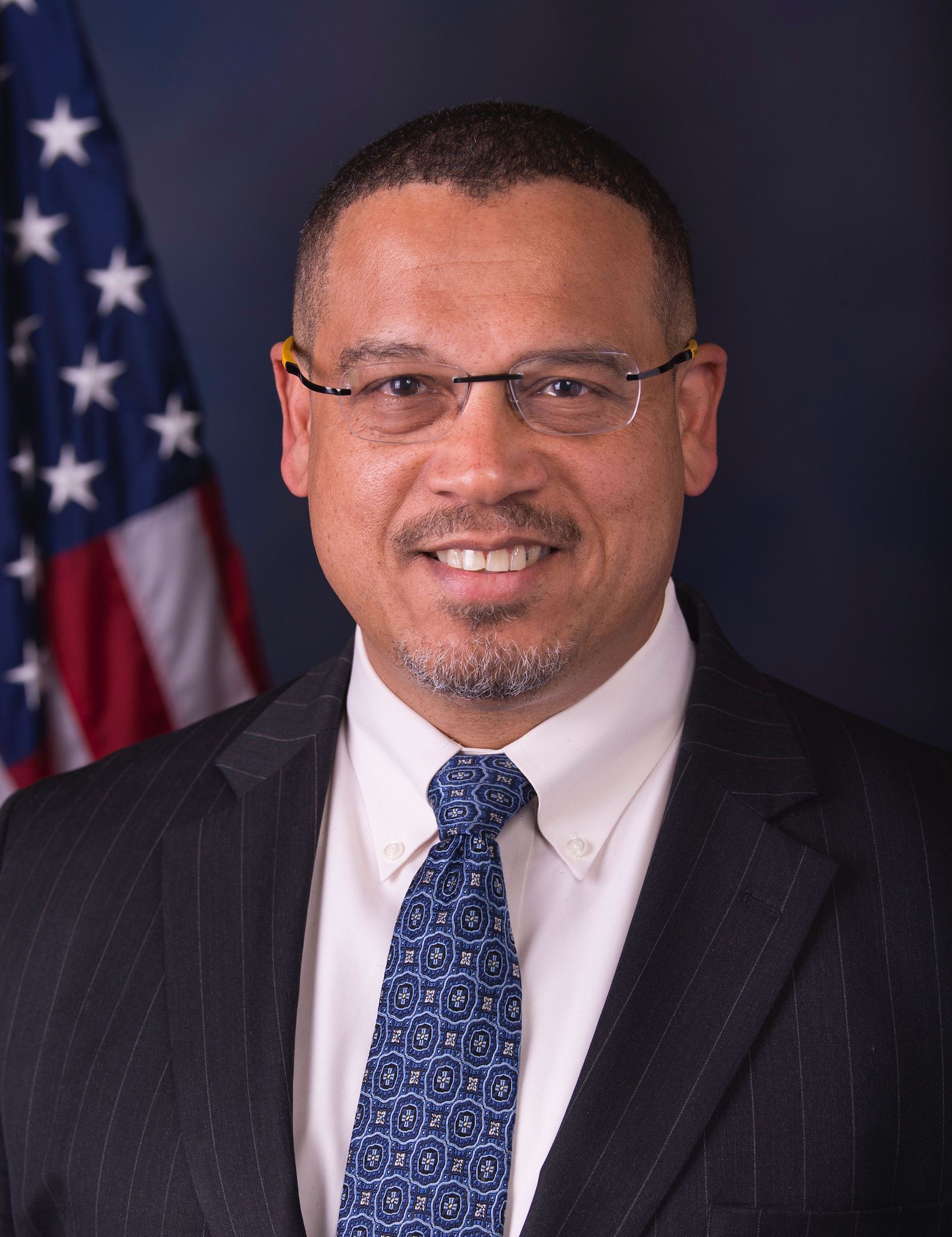
Keith Ellison

=== State legislative leaders ===
- President of the Senate: Bobby Joe Champion (since 2023)
- Senate majority leader: Erin Murphy (since 2024)
- House minority leader: Zack Stephenson (since 2025)

=== Mayors ===
- Minneapolis (list): Jacob Frey (since 2018) (1)
- Saint Paul (list): Kaohly Her (since 2026) (2)
- Duluth (list): Roger Reinert (since 2024) (5)

== Leadership ==
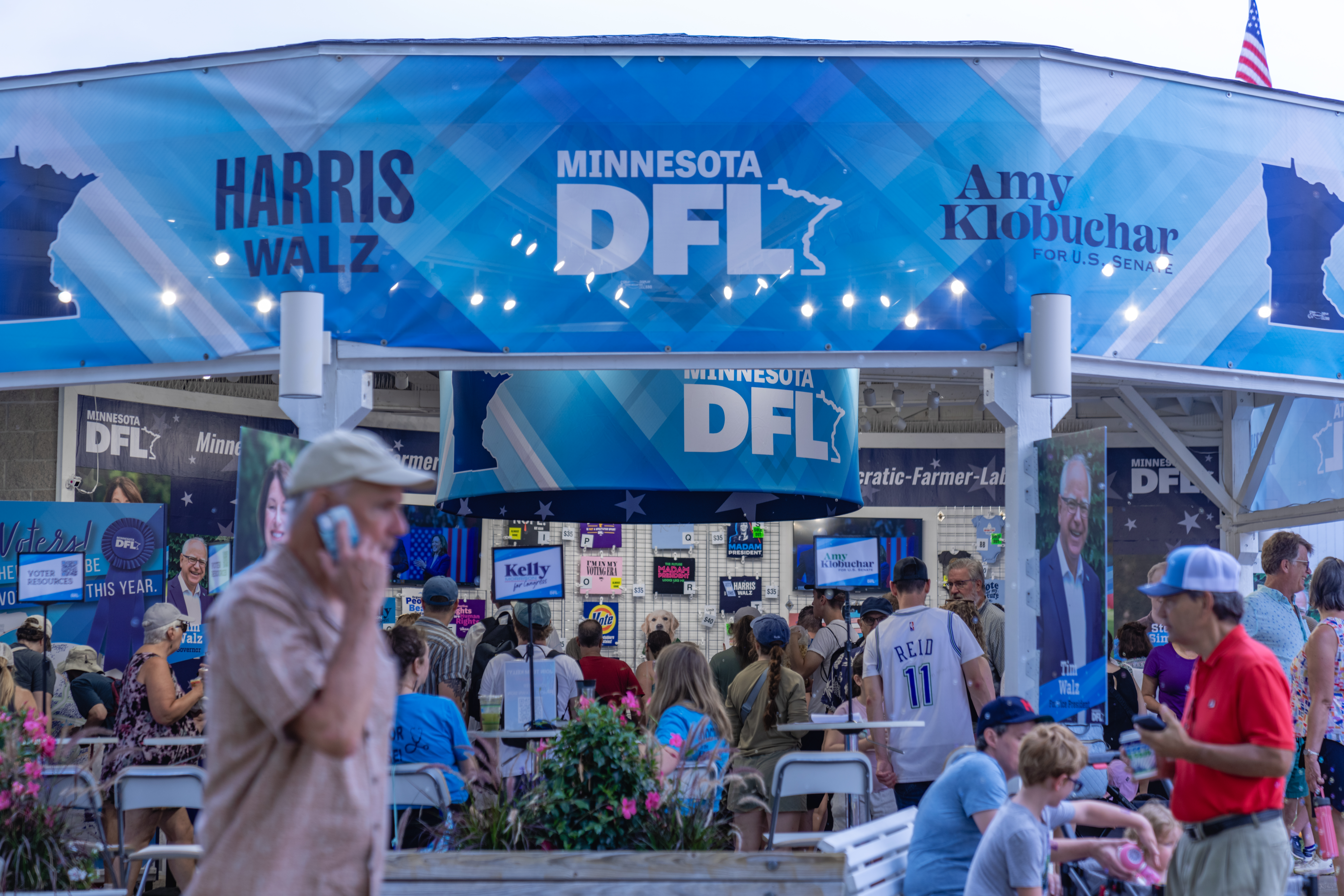
DFL booth at the 2024 Minnesota State Fair

=== Current ===
- Chair: Richard Carlbom (since 2025)
- Vice chair: Marge Hoffa (since 2011)
- Second vice chair: Shivanthi Sathanandan (since 2021)
- Treasurer: Lindy Sowmick (since 2025)
- Secretary: Ceri Everett (since 2021)
- Outreach officer: Quentin Wathum-Ocama (since 2025)

=== Historical party chairs ===
Through 1975, the party's constitution called for the election of a separate chairman and chairwoman to head state party activities. Only the chairman received compensation. In the mid-1970s, the party voted to change the titles of the chief party offices to "chair" and "associate chair", specifying that they must both be salaried and must be of the opposite sex.

==== State chairmen ====
- Elmer Kelm (1944–1946)
- Harold H. Barker (1946–1948)
- Orville Freeman (1948–1950)
- Karl Rolvaag (1950–1954)
- Ray Hemenway (1954–1960)
- Adrian Winkel (1960–1961)
- George Farr (1961–1967)
- Warren Spannaus (1967–1969)
- Richard Moe (1969–1972)
- Hank Fischer (1972–1975)

==== State chairwomen ====
- Ione Hunt (1948–1950)
- Dorothy Houston Jacobson (1950–1956)
- Anne Vetter (1956–1958)
- Geri M. Joseph (1958–1960)
- Evelyn Malone (1960–1962)
- Pat St. Angelo (1962–1963)
- Betty Kane (1963–1968)
- Koryne Horbal (1968–1972)

==== State chairs ====
- Koryne Kaneski Horbal (1968–1977)
- Claire Rumpel (1978–1979)
- Mike Hatch (1980–1983)
- Mary Monahan (1983–1985)
- Ruth Stanoch (1985–1989)
- Todd Otis (1990–1993)
- Rick Stafford (1993–1995)
- Mark Andrew (1995–1997)
- Richard Senese (1997–1999)
- Mike Erlandson (1999–2005)
- Brian Melendez (2005–2011)
- Ken Martin (2011–2025)
- Richard Carlbom (2025–present)

== Electoral history ==
Sources: Minnesota Secretary of State (1992-present), Minnesota Legislative Reference Library (pre-1992)

=== Federal ===
==== U.S. Senate ====
Class 1
Year	Candidate	Votes	%	Won
1946	Theodore Jorgenson	349,520	39.8	No
1952	William E. Carlson	590,011	42.5	No
1958	Eugene McCarthy	608,847	53.0	Yes
1964	Eugene McCarthy	931,363	60.3	Yes
1970	Hubert Humphrey	788,256	57.8	Yes
1976	Hubert Humphrey	1,290,736	67.5	Yes
1978 (sp)	Bob Short	538,675	34.6	No
1982	Mark Dayton	840,401	46.6	No
1988	Skip Humphrey	856,694	40.9	No
1994	Ann Wynia	781,860	44.1	No
2000	Mark Dayton	1,181,553	48.8	Yes
2006	Amy Klobuchar	1,278,849	58.1	Yes
2012	Amy Klobuchar	1,854,595	65.2	Yes
2018	Amy Klobuchar	1,566,174	60.3	Yes
2024	Amy Klobuchar	1,792,441	56.2	Yes
2027 (sp)				

Class 2
Year	Candidate	Votes	%	Won
1948	Hubert Humphrey	729,494	59.8	Yes
1954	Hubert Humphrey	642,193	56.4	Yes
1960	Hubert Humphrey	884,168	57.5	Yes
1966	Walter Mondale	685,840	53.9	Yes
1972	Walter Mondale	981,320	56.7	Yes
1978	Wendell R. Anderson	638,375	40.4	No
1984	Joan Growe	852,844	41.3	No
1990	Paul Wellstone	911,999	50.5	Yes
1996	Paul Wellstone	1,098,430	50.3	Yes
2002	Walter Mondale (Note: Replaced Paul Wellstone following his death.)	1,067,246	47.3	No
2008	Al Franken	1,212,629	42.0	Yes
2014	Al Franken	1,053,205	53.2	Yes
2018 (sp)	Tina Smith	1,370,540	53.0	Yes
2020	Tina Smith	1,566,522	48.7	Yes
2026	Peggy Flanagan	1,520,871	53.7	Yes

==== U.S. House ====
Election	Votes	%	Seats (MN)	±	%
1944			1 / 9	▲1	11.1
1946			1 / 9	0	11.1
1948			4 / 9	▲3	44.4
1950			4 / 9	0	44.4
1952			4 / 9	0	44.4
1954			5 / 9	▲1	55.5
1956			5 / 9	0	55.5
1958			4 / 9	▼1	44.4
1960			3 / 8	▼1	37.5
1962			4 / 8	▲1	50
1964			4 / 8	0	50
1966			3 / 8	▼1	37.5
1968			3 / 8	0	37.5
1970			4 / 8	▲1	50
1972			4 / 8	0	50
1974			5 / 8	▲1	62.5
1976			5 / 8	0	62.5
1978			4 / 8	▼1	50
1980			3 / 8	▼1	37.5
1982			5 / 8	▲2	62.5
1984			5 / 8	0	62.5
1986			5 / 8	0	62.5
1988			5 / 8	0	62.5
1990			6 / 8	▲1	75
1992			7 / 8	▲1	87.5
1994			6 / 8	▼1	75
1996			6 / 8	0	75
1998			6 / 8	0	75
2000	1,234,204	52.2	5 / 8	▼1	62.5
2002	1,097,911	49.9	4 / 8	▼1	50.0
2004	1,399,624	51.4	4 / 8	0	50.0
2006	1,152,621	52.9	5 / 8	▲1	62.5
2008	1,612,480	57.5	5 / 8	0	62.5
2010	1,002,026	47.9	4 / 8	▼1	50.0
2012	985,760	55.5	5 / 8	▲1	62.5
2014	985,760	50.2	5 / 8	0	62.5
2016	1,434,590	50.2	5 / 8	0	62.5
2018	1,420,748	55.1	5 / 8	0	62.5
2020	1,554,373	48.7	4 / 8	▼1	50.0
2022	1,250,479	50.1	4 / 8	0	50.0
2024	1,579,742	50.2	4 / 8	0	50.0
2026	1,574,159	56.1	5 / 8	▲1	62.5

=== State ===
==== Executive Offices ====
Governor
Year	Candidate	Votes	%	Won
1944	Byron G. Allen	430,132	37.8	No
1946	Harold H. Barker	349,565	39.7	No
1948	Charles Halsted	545,766	45.1	No
1950	Harry H. Peterson	400,637	38.3	No
1952	Orville Freeman	624,480	44.0	No
1954	Orville Freeman	607,099	52.7	Yes
1956	Orville Freeman	731,180	51.4	Yes
1958	Orville Freeman	658,326	56.8	Yes
1960	Orville Freeman	760,934	49.1	No
1962	Karl Rolvaag	619,842	49.7	Yes
1966	Karl Rolvaag	607,943	46.9	No
1970	Wendell Anderson	737,921	54.0	Yes
1974	Wendell Anderson	786,787	62.8	Yes
1978	Rudy Perpich	718,244	45.3	No
1982	Rudy Perpich	718,244	58.8	Yes
1986	Rudy Perpich	790,138	56.1	Yes
1990	Rudy Perpich	836,218	46.8	No
1994	John Marty	589,344	34.1	No
1998	Skip Humphrey	587,528	28.1	No
2002	Roger Moe	821,268	36.5	No
2006	Mike Hatch	1,007,460	45.7	No
2010	Mark Dayton	919,232	43.6	Yes
2014	Mark Dayton	989,113	50.1	Yes
2018	Tim Walz	1,393,096	53.8	Yes
2022	Tim Walz	1,312,349	52.3	Yes
2026	Amy Klobuchar	1,569,699	55.5	Yes

Lieutenant Governor (Note: Election of the Lieutenant Governor was separate from the gubernatorial election until 1974.)
Year	Candidate	Votes	%	Won
1944	Frank Murphy	462,222	41.8	No
1946	Frank McGinn	332,733	38.8	No
1948	John T. McDonough	562,422	48.3	No
1950	Frank Murphy	401,148	39.7	No
1952	Arthur Hansen	615,186	45.7	No
1954	Karl Rolvaag	532,444	47.5	Yes
1956	Karl Rolvaag	725,800	52.6	Yes
1958	Karl Rolvaag	648,941	58.1	Yes
1960	Karl Rolvaag	822,923	55.0	Yes
1962	Alexander M. Keith	613,650	50.1	Yes
1966	Robert E. Short	620,293	48.9	No
1970	Rudy Perpich	671,749	50.6	Yes

Secretary of State
Year	Candidate	Votes	%	Won
1944	Emily Kneubuhl	342,342	30.3	No
1946	Frances Delaney	271,133	30.9	No
1948	Koscie H. Marsh	447,028	37.4	No
1950	Marie F. McGuire	344,173	33.4	No
1952 (sp.)	Melvin Cooper	552,780	42.8	No
1952	Koscie H. Marsh	605,680	43.9	No
1954	Joseph L. Donovan	587,359	51.6	Yes
1956	Joseph L. Donovan	723,739	51.9	Yes
1958	Joseph L. Donovan	654,137	57.8	Yes
1960	Joseph L. Donovan	891,421	59.2	Yes
1962	Joseph L. Donovan	729,561	59.6	Yes
1966	Joseph L. Donovan	695,256	55.0	Yes
1970	Daniel D. Donovan	657,153	49.6	No
1974	Joan Growe	640,948	52.3	Yes
1978	Joan Growe	788,253	52.1	Yes
1982	Joan Growe	1,028,792	59.3	Yes
1986	Joan Growe	911,977	66.4	Yes
1990	Joan Growe	1,094,696	62.0	Yes
1994	Joan Growe	1,038,455	60.0	Yes
1998	Edwina Garcia	818,236	41.2	No
2002	Buck Humphrey	974,045	44.5	No
2006	Mark Ritchie	1,049,432	49.0	Yes
2010	Mark Ritchie	999,382	49.1	Yes
2014	Steve Simon	901,450	47.0	Yes
2018	Steve Simon	1,328,502	52.2	Yes
2022	Steve Simon	1,345,685	54.5	Yes
2026	Steve Simon	1,529,231	54.7	Yes

Attorney General
Year	Candidate	Votes	%	Won
1944	Erling Swenson	437,633	40.2	No
1946	Walter C. Boland	325,764	38.2	No
1948	Francis M. Smith	524,607	45.6	No
1950	Orville Freeman	429,320	42.7	No
1952	Allan L. Johnson	560,760	41.4	No
1954	Miles Lord	587,883	52.7	Yes
1956	Miles Lord	694,694	50.2	Yes
1958	Miles Lord	627,851	55.7	Yes
1960	Walter Mondale	871,495	58.2	Yes
1962	Walter Mondale	730,783	59.6	Yes
1966	Wayne H. Olson	586,982	46.7	No
1970	Warren Spannaus	680,479	51.3	Yes
1974	Warren Spannaus	786,857	64.2	Yes
1978	Warren Spannaus	858,547	55.9	Yes
1982	Skip Humphrey	1,082,539	61.2	Yes
1986	Skip Humphrey	985,569	70.3	Yes
1990	Skip Humphrey	1,126,447	63.2	Yes
1994	Skip Humphrey	1,115,285	64.7	Yes
1998	Mike Hatch	960,558	47.8	Yes
2002	Mike Hatch	1,197,362	54.6	Yes
2006	Lori Swanson	1,131,474	53.2	Yes
2010	Lori Swanson	1,075,536	52.9	Yes
2014	Lori Swanson	1,014,714	52.6	Yes
2018	Keith Ellison	1,249,407	48.9	Yes
2022	Keith Ellison	1,254,371	50.3	Yes
2026	Keith Ellison	1,521,031	54.3	Yes

Auditor
Year	Candidate	Votes	%	Won
1946	Bernie M. Olson	327,268	38.3	No
1950	Elmer A. Borgschatz	371,665	37.1	No
1954	Clint Haroldson	553,444	49.3	No
1958	George A. Farr	547,836	48.8	No
1962	John D. Nevin	560,032	45.9	No
1966	Robert E. Hansen	560,945	44.7	No
1970	Jon Wefald	644,343	49.1	No
1974	Robert W. Mattson Jr.	627,888	52.3	Yes
1978	Robert W. Mattson Jr.	695,943	46.6	No
1982	Paul Wellstone	769,254	45.1	No
1986	John Dooley	608,913	44.9	No
1990	Mark Dayton	1,011,124	57.3	Yes
1994	Donald Moe	768,630	45.5	No
1998	Nancy Larson	812,892	41.2	No
2002	Carol C. Johnson	941,129	43.9	No
2006	Rebecca Otto	1,094,440	51.9	Yes
2010	Rebecca Otto	981,822	48.3	Yes
2014	Rebecca Otto	988,102	51.5	Yes
2018	Julie Blaha	1,250,524	49.5	Yes
2022	Julie Blaha	1,168,185	47.4	Yes
2026	Zack Filipovich	1,474,043	52.9	Yes

==== Legislature ====
Minnesota Senate
Election	Votes	%	Seats	±	%	Majority
1976	1,024,624	51.9	49 / 67	N/A	73.1	Yes
1980	1,024,624	49.3	46 / 67	▼3	68.7	Yes
1982	951,287	51.8	42 / 67	▼4	62.7	Yes
1986	765,584	52.6	47 / 67	▲5	70.2	Yes
1990	990,513	53.7	46 / 67	▼1	68.7	Yes
1992	1,247,594	53.0	45 / 67	▼1	67.2	Yes
1996	1,129,095	51.1	42 / 67	▼3	62.7	Yes
2000	1,219,497	49.6	39 / 67	▼3	58.2	Yes
2002	1,080,975	49.7	35 / 67	▼4	52.2	Yes
2006	1,183,319	55.3	44 / 67	▲6	65.7	Yes
2010	1,005,132	48.9	30 / 67	▼16	44.7	No
2012	1,532,065	55.8	39 / 67	▲9	58.2	Yes
2016	1,409,775	50.1	33 / 67	▼6	49.3	No
2020	1,577,523	49.8	33 / 67	0	49.3	No
2022	1,239,682	50.7	34 / 67	▲1	50.7	Yes
2026	1,551,222	55.8	39 / 67	▲5	58.2	Yes

Minnesota House of Representatives
Election	Votes	%	Seats	±	%	Majority
1996	1,027,921	46.4	70 / 134	▲1	52.2	Yes
1998	934,919	46.3	63 / 134	▼7	48.5	No
2000	1,058,824	46.4	65 / 134	▲2	47.0	No
2002	1,034,046	47.8	52 / 134	▼11	38.8	No
2004	1,381,412	51.2	66 / 134	▲13	49.3	No
2006	1,169,298	54.9	85 / 134	▲19	63.4	Yes
2008	1,516,633	54.9	87 / 134	▲2	64.9	Yes
2010	995,853	48.5	62 / 134	▼25	46.3	No
2012	1,468,364	53.7	73 / 134	▲11	54.5	Yes
2014	944,961	49.3	62 / 134	▼11	46.3	No
2016	1,366,375	49.1	57 / 134	▼4	42.5	No
2018	1,388,938	54.4	75 / 134	▲18	55.9	Yes
2020	1,601,357	51.1	70 / 134	▼5	52.2	Yes
2022	1,237,520	50.9	70 / 134	0	52.2	Yes
2024	1,545,213	49.9	67 / 134	▼3	50.0	No
2026	1,548,584	56.5	77 / 134	▲10	57.5	Yes

== See also ==
- List of political parties in Minnesota
- Political party strength in Minnesota
- Politics of Minnesota
