= Environmental Caucus of the Minnesota Democratic–Farmer–Labor Party =

- Chairperson: Matt Doll
- Secretary: Lorraine Rovig
- Governing body: DFLEC Executive Team
- Founded: 2015
- Ideology: Progressivism, Environmentalism
- Regional affiliation: Minnesota DFL

Website
- https://dflec.org/

The Environmental Caucus of the Minnesota Democratic–Farmer–Labor Party (DFL Environmental Causus or DFLEC) is a caucus within the Minnesota DFL made of environmentalists.

== History ==
The DFLEC was founded in 2015. The DFLEC was successful in having many of their policies passed under governor Tim Walz, such as replacing lead service lines, the restriction of carcinogenic forever chemicals, and a sales tax on the Metro Transit. A major ally of the caucus in the legislature was Melissa Hortman. At the 2026 annual convention, attendees included Keith Ellison, Shelley Buck, and Matt Little.

The DFLEC has been criticized for a rejection of nuclear power in favor of solar power and wind power.

=== Chairs ===
- Veda Kanitz 2015-2021
- Megan Bond 2021-2025
- Matt Doll 2025-
