= Warren Spannaus =

American politician

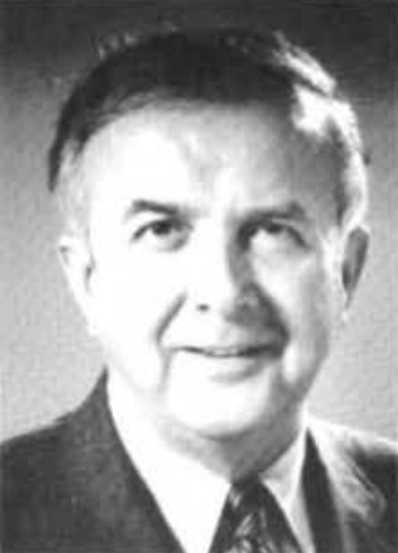

26th Attorney General of Minnesota
- In office January 4, 1971 – January 3, 1983
- Governor: Wendell R. Anderson; Rudy Perpich; Al Quie
- Preceded by: Douglas M. Head
- Succeeded by: Skip Humphrey

Personal details
- Born: Warren Richard Spannaus; December 5, 1930 St. Paul, Minnesota, U.S.
- Died: November 27, 2017 (aged 86) St. Louis Park, Minnesota, U.S.
- Party: Democratic-Farmer-Labor
- Spouse: Marjorie Clarkson
- Profession: Attorney

Warren Richard Spannaus (December 5, 1930 – November 27, 2017) was an American politician from Minnesota. A member of the Democratic-Farmer-Labor Party (DFL), Spannaus served as attorney general of Minnesota from 1971 to 1983.

Spannaus was born in 1930 in St. Paul, Minnesota. He graduated from the University of Minnesota Law School in 1963. He was first elected attorney general in 1970 and assumed office on January 4, 1971. Spannaus was re-elected to the position twice, in 1974 and 1978, serving from 1971 to 1983 in total. At the 1980 Democratic National Convention, Spannaus received two votes for the party's presidential nomination, which went to incumbent President Jimmy Carter. In 1982, he ran for governor of Minnesota as the DFL-endorsed candidate, supported by state chair Mike Hatch and his faction, the Centrists. He lost the primary election to former Governor Rudy Perpich, who went on to win the general election. Spannaus joined the Minneapolis-based law firm of Dorsey & Whitney. Spannaus married Marjorie Clarkson and had three children.

He died in 2017 at the age of 86.

Legal offices
Preceded by Douglas M. Head	Minnesota Attorney General; 1971 – 1983	Succeeded by Skip Humphrey
Party political offices
Preceded by Wayne H. Olson	DFL nominee for Attorney General of Minnesota; 1970, 1974, 1978	Succeeded by Skip Humphrey
Preceded by Rudy Perpich	Endorsed Gubernatorial Candidate, Minnesota DFL State Convention; 1982	Succeeded by Rudy Perpich
Preceded by George Farr	Democratic-Farmer-Labor Party Chairman; 1967-1969	Succeeded by Richard Moe
