= Susie Williamson Stageberg =

American political activist (1877-1961)

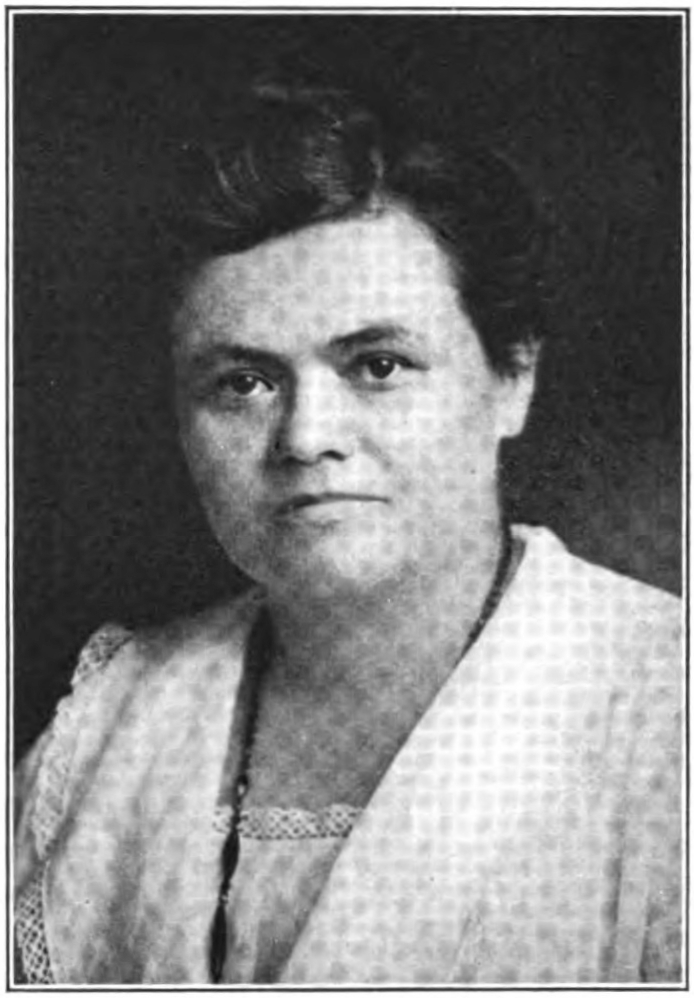
- Stageberg c. 1924
- Born: Susanna Williamson; January 30, 1877; Badger, Iowa, U.S.
- Died: March 15, 1961 (aged 84); Red Wing, Minnesota
- Occupations: Political activist, educator
- Political party: Progressive Party (after 1950)
- Other political affiliations: Minnesota Farmer–Labor Party (1922–1944); Nonpartisan League (1920–1922)
- Spouse: Olaf O. Stageberg
- Children: 5 sons

Susie Williamson Stageberg (January 30, 1877 - March 15, 1961) was an American political activist and prohibitionist known as the "Mother of Farmer–Labor Party. She was a Perennial candidate running for Minnesota Secretary of State in 1922, 1924 and 1928, US House in 1932, and Minnesota Lieutenant Governor in 1950.

== Early life and education ==
Stageberg was born January 30, 1877, in Badger, Iowa to Norwegian immigrants Ole Williamson and Krista Scargaard. Growing up, she attended various rural country schools, including Tobin College and Jewell Lutheran College. Stageberg eventually became a teacher for rural areas and a reporter for the Fort Dodge Messenger.

On June 29, 1898, Stageberg married Olaf O. Stageberg, a professor of mathematics and languages. In 1907, the couple move to Forest City, Iowa where she was the dean of women at Waldorf College while Olaf taught there. The couple moved to Red Wing, Minnesota for Olaf to teach at Red Wing Seminary, where Stageberg encouraged the seminary to admit women, which they did start in 1914.

== Political activism ==
Stageberg was active in the Red Wing community as well as the temperance movement, serving as the president of the Red Wing chapter of the Women's Christian Temperance Union for 19 years. During her time as president, she campaigned for the 18th Amendment and 19th Amenedment. Stageberg supported her husband's attempt to run for Minnesota Governor in 1918 on the anti-alcohol National Party ticket, which he lost.

Throughout the 1920s, Stageberg wrote and edited for various newspapers, including the "Kitchen Column" in farmers-owned newspapers and "As a Woman Sees it" in the Minnesota Leader. She also became the editor of the weekly newspaper The Organized Farmer, where she criticized business and government policies she felt harmed farmers.

In 1920, Staeberg joined the Nonpartisan League before giving a speech in 1922 supporting the creation of the Minnesota Farmer-Labor Party, which led to her being dubbed the "Mother of Farmer-Labor." She then ran for Minnesota secretary of state in 1922 in the Farmer-Labor Party, becoming the first woman to run for that office, running against Republican incumbent Mike Holm and Democrat Claude Swanson. Stageberg came in second with 37% of the vote, to Holm's 52%. Stageberg would run for secretary of state against Holm in 1924 and 1928 and would come in second place both times with 35% and 18%, respectively.

The last time Stageberg ran in the Farmer–Labor party was in the primary for the at-large seat in the United States House of Representatives. Stageberg lost, receiving only 2.62% of the vote. In April 1944, the Farmer–Labor party merged with the Democratic Party, which Stageberg vehemently opposed, believing the move would deteriorate the socialist wing of the new party. In 1950, she left the Minnesota Democratic–Farmer–Labor Party saying the party was run by "Wall Street monopolists and professional militarists." The same year, nominated by petition, Stageberg ran for Minnesota lieutenant governor and lost, coming in third with 1.89% of the vote.

== Personal life ==
Stageberg and her husband had five sons together. She was a devoted member of the Lutheran Church and taught Sunday school for over 50 years.

== Death ==
Stageberg died March 15, 1961, in Red Wing.
