= Mike Holm =

American politician (1876–1952)

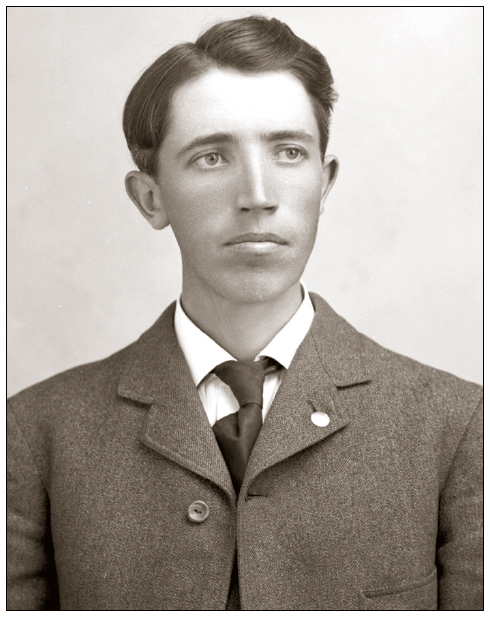
- Holm, C.1920s

14th Minnesota Secretary of State
- In office January 4, 1921 – July 6, 1952
- Governor: J. A. O. Preus; Theodore Christianson; Floyd B. Olson; Hjalmar Petersen; Elmer A. Benson; Harold E. Stassen; Edward J. Thye; Luther W. Youngdahl; C. Elmer Anderson
- Preceded by: Julius A. Schmahl
- Succeeded by: H.H. Chesterman

Personal details
- Born: June 17, 1876 Strömsund Municipality, Jämtland County, Sweden
- Died: July 6, 1952 (aged 76) Saint Paul, Minnesota, U.S.
- Party: Republican
- Spouses: Maria Severson (m. 1897; died 1909) Bessie Christenson (m. 1910; died 1944) Virginia Paul Holm (m. 1946)
- Relatives: Jim Holm (grandson)

Mike Holm (June 17, 1876 – July 6, 1952) was a Swedish-born American politician and the longest-serving Minnesota Secretary of State, serving from January 4, 1921 until his death on July 6, 1952. His wife, Virginia Paul Holm, later succeeded him in the office. A resident of Roseau, Minnesota, Holm was a Republican.

== Biography ==
Mike Holm was born Mikael Hansson in the village of Ringvattnet in Alanäs parish of Strömsund Municipality in Jämtland County, Sweden to parents Hans Hansson Holm and Karin Persdotter. The Holm family left their home in Sweden in June 1883 where they traveled to Trondheim, Norway to depart for America. Norwegian police passport records indicate they boarded the S/S Tasso on 20 Jun 1883 and sailed first to Christiania (now Oslo) then to Christiansand, then to Ålesund, and finally arriving in Hull, England. They then traveled from Hull across England to Liverpool, where they departed aboard the British passenger steamship RMS City of Chester of the Inman Line on 05 Jul 1883 sailing first to Queenstown, Ireland and then on to New York City. They left Queenstown 06 Jul 1883 and arrived in New York on 15 Jul 1883.

The Holm family first settled in Nelson Park Township of Marshall County, Minnesota - where they appear in the 1885 Minnesota State Census. By the time of the 1895 Minnesota State Census, Holm was 19 years of age and no longer living with his parents. By 1897, Holm was living in the city of Roseau, Minnesota where he married his first wife Maria Severson (b. 1877) on 10 Apr 1897.

Mike and Maria had three children, all born in Roseau, Minnesota: Thelma Larue (b. 1897), Gladys Marie (b. 1899), and Richard H. (b. 1900). Maria died in 1909. Mike Holm married his second wife Bessie Sahra May Christenson (b. 1889) on 15 June 1910 in Roseau, Minnesota. Mike and Bessie had four children: Michael W. (b. 1915 in Roseau), Wava Elain (b. 1917 in Roseau), John Sterling (1920–1998, b. in Roseau), and Donald Gladstone (b. 1922 in St. Paul). Bessie died in 1944, and Mike married his third wife, Virginia (born Virginia Retta Shoop), in 1946 in the city of St. Paul, Minnesota.

Party political offices
Preceded by Julius A. Schmahl	Republican nominee for Minnesota Secretary of State; 1920, 1922, 1924, 1926, 1928, 1930, 1932, 1934, 1936, 1938, 1940, 1942, 1944, 1946, 1948, 1950	Succeeded by Virginia Paul Holm
Political offices
Preceded by Julius A. Schmahl	Secretary of State of Minnesota; 1921-1952	Succeeded by H.H. Chesterman
