= Virginia Paul Holm =

American politician (1902–1968)

- Holm in ~1955

16th Minnesota Secretary of State
- In office September 16, 1952 – January 4, 1955
- Governor: C. Elmer Anderson
- Preceded by: H.H. Chesterman
- Succeeded by: Joseph L. Donovan

Personal details
- Born: March 14, 1902
- Died: October 1968 (aged 66)
- Party: Republican
- Spouse: Mike Holm (m. 1946; died 1952)

Virginia Paul Holm Bye (March 14, 1902 – October 1968) was a Minnesota politician, a member of the Republican Party, and the first woman to serve as Secretary of State of Minnesota.

Holm was appointed to the position in 1952 by Gov. Elmer Anderson. She succeeded H.H. Chesterman, who had himself previously been appointed to fill the vacancy left by the death of Holm's husband, former Secretary of State Mike Holm.

Holm won election in her own right in November 1952, but lost her bid for re-election in 1954. Her name on the ballot was Mrs. Mike Holm.

Party political offices
Preceded by Mike Holm	Republican nominee for Minnesota Secretary of State; 1952, 1954	Succeeded by C. Elmer Anderson
Political offices
Preceded by H.H. Chesterman	Secretary of State of Minnesota; 1952-1955	Succeeded by Joseph L. Donovan
