= 1900 Minnesota Secretary of State election =

- November 6, 1900
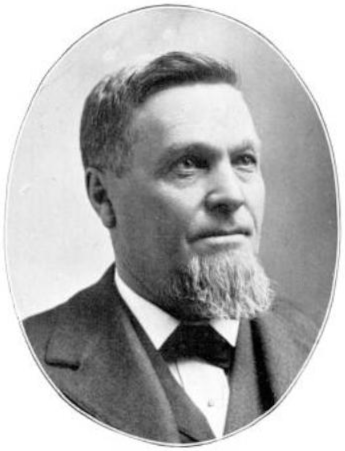

Nominee	Peter E. Hanson	Michael E. Neary
Party	Republican	Democratic
Popular vote	174,867	121,776
Percentage	57.14%	39.79%
Secretary of State before election
Albert Berg
Republican
Elected Secretary of State
Peter E. Hanson
Republican

The 1900 Minnesota Secretary of State election was held on November 6, 1900, in order to elect the Secretary of State of Minnesota. Republican nominee and former member of the Minnesota Senate Peter E. Hanson defeated Democratic nominee Michael E. Neary and Prohibition nominee Frank E. Carlisle.

== General election ==
On election day, November 6, 1900, Republican nominee Peter E. Hanson won the election by a margin of 53,091 votes against his foremost opponent Democratic nominee Michael E. Neary, thereby retaining Republican control over the office of Secretary of State. Hanson was sworn in as the 12th Minnesota Secretary of State on January 7, 1901.

=== Results ===
Minnesota Secretary of State election, 1900
Party	Candidate	Votes	%
Republican	Peter E. Hanson	174,867	57.14
Democratic	Michael E. Neary	121,776	39.79
Prohibition	Frank E. Carlisle	9,375	3.07
Total votes		306,018	100.00
Republican hold			
