= 1978 Minnesota Secretary of State election =

- November 7, 1978

Nominee	Joan Growe	Gerald Brekke
Party	Democratic (DFL)	Ind.-Republican
Popular vote	788,253	664,829
Percentage	52.13%	43.97%
- County results Growe: 40–50% 50–60% 60–70% Brekke: 40–50% 50–60% 60–70%
Secretary of State before election
Joan Growe
Democratic (DFL)
Elected Secretary of State
Joan Growe
Democratic (DFL)

The 1978 Minnesota Secretary of State election was held on November 7, 1978, in order to elect the Secretary of State of Minnesota. Democratic–Farmer–Labor nominee and incumbent Secretary of State Joan Growe defeated Independent-Republican nominee Gerald Brekke and American Party nominee Dianna Jenkins.

== General election ==
On election day, November 7, 1978, Democratic–Farmer–Labor nominee Joan Growe won re-election by a margin of 123,424 votes against her foremost opponent Independent-Republican nominee Gerald Brekke, thereby retaining Democratic–Farmer–Labor control over the office of Secretary of State. Growe was sworn in for her second term on January 3, 1979.

=== Results ===
Minnesota Secretary of State election, 1978
Party	Candidate	Votes	%
Democratic (DFL)	Joan Growe (incumbent)	788,253	52.13
Ind.-Republican	Gerald Brekke	664,829	43.97
American	Dianna Jenkins	59,031	3.90
Total votes		1,512,113	100.00
Democratic (DFL) hold			
