= 1906 Minnesota Secretary of State election =

- November 6, 1906
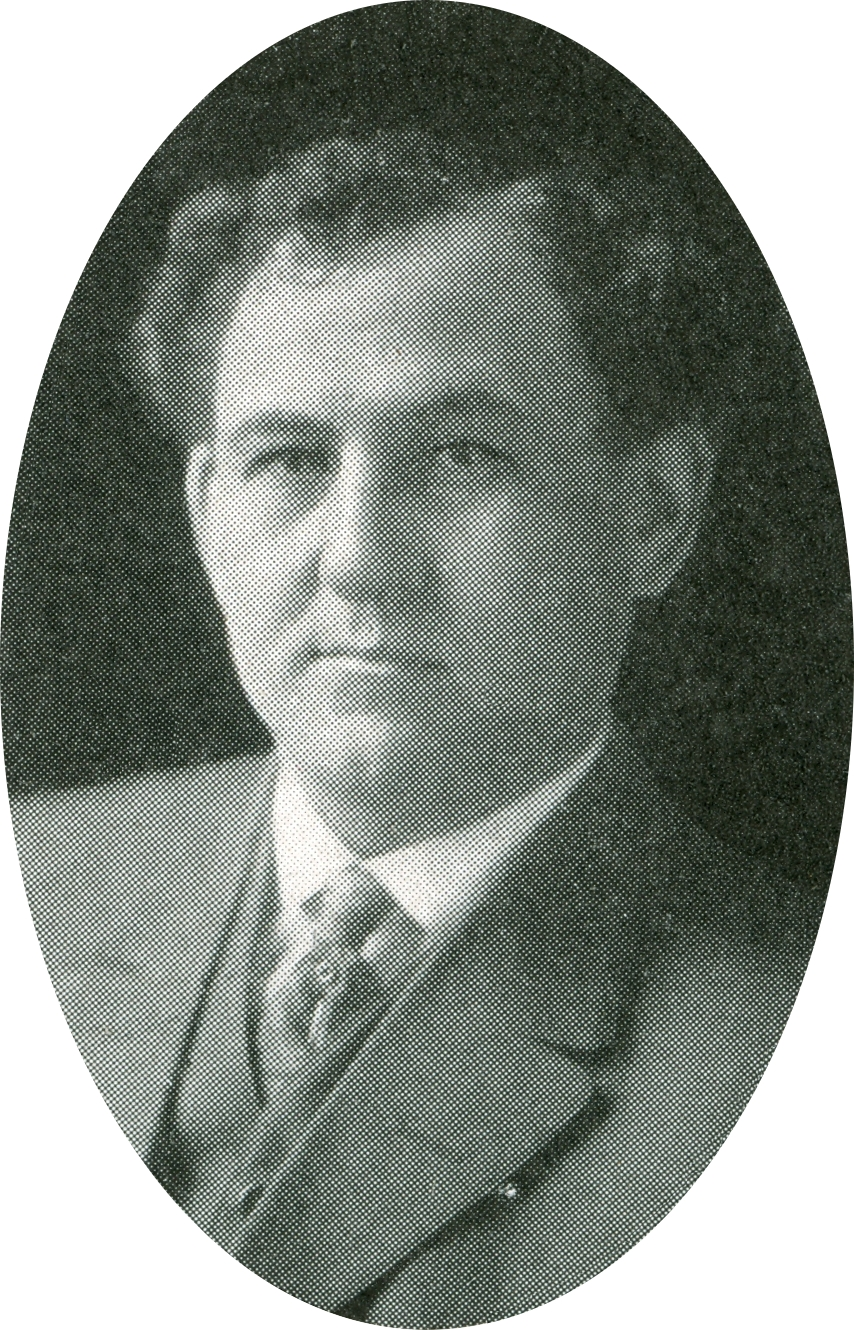

Nominee	Julius A. Schmahl	Peter M. Magnusson	Nels C. Hendricks
Party	Republican	Democratic	Prohibition
Popular vote	142,266	101,307	15,900
Percentage	54.83%	39.04%	6.13%
Secretary of State before election
Peter E. Hanson
Republican
Elected Secretary of State
Julius A. Schmahl
Republican

The 1906 Minnesota Secretary of State election was held on November 6, 1906, in order to elect the Secretary of State of Minnesota. Republican nominee Julius A. Schmahl defeated Democratic nominee Peter M. Magnusson and Prohibition nominee Nels C. Hendricks.

== General election ==
On election day, November 6, 1906, Republican nominee Julius A. Schmahl won the election by a margin of 40,959 votes against his foremost opponent Democratic nominee Peter M. Magnusson, thereby retaining Republican control over the office of Secretary of State. Schmahl was sworn in as the 13th Minnesota Secretary of State on January 7, 1907.

=== Results ===
Minnesota Secretary of State election, 1906
Party	Candidate	Votes	%
Republican	Julius A. Schmahl	142,266	54.83
Democratic	Peter M. Magnusson	101,307	39.04
Prohibition	Nels C. Hendricks	15,900	6.13
Total votes		259,473	100.00
Republican hold			
