= 1879 Minnesota Secretary of State election =

- November 4, 1879
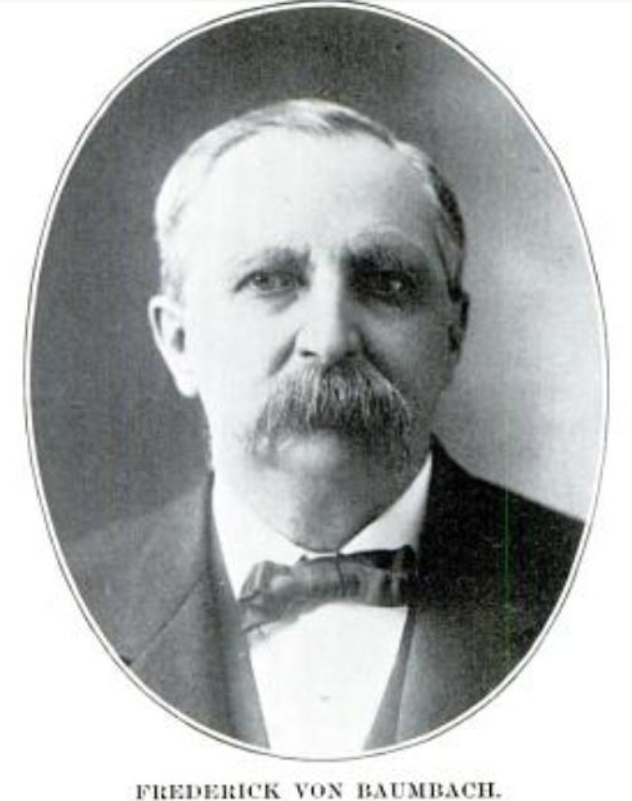

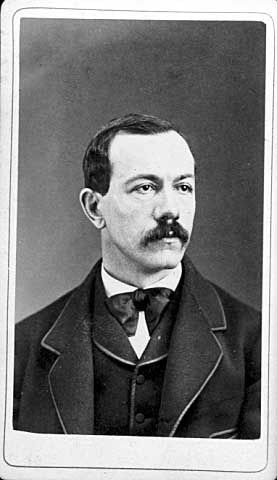
Nominee	Frederick Von Baumbach	Felix A. Borer
Party	Republican	Democratic
Popular vote	60,430	39,464
Percentage	56.71%	37.03%
Secretary of State before election
John S. Irgens
Republican
Elected Secretary of State
Frederick Von Baumbach
Republican

The 1879 Minnesota Secretary of State election was held on November 4, 1879, in order to elect the Secretary of State of Minnesota. Republican nominee Frederick Von Baumbach defeated Democratic nominee Felix A. Borer, Greenback nominee Alexander P. Lane and Prohibition nominee Isaac C. Stearns.

== General election ==
On election day, November 4, 1879, Republican nominee Frederick Von Baumbach won the election by a margin of 20,966 votes against his foremost opponent Democratic nominee Felix A. Borer, thereby retaining Republican control over the office of Secretary of State. Von Baumbach was sworn in as the 8th Minnesota Secretary of State on January 7, 1880.

=== Results ===
Minnesota Secretary of State election, 1879
Party	Candidate	Votes	%
Republican	Frederick Von Baumbach	60,430	56.71
Democratic	Felix A. Borer	39,464	37.03
Greenback	Alexander P. Lane	4,139	3.88
Prohibition	Isaac C. Stearns	2,528	2.38
Total votes		106,743	100.00
Republican hold			
