= 1966 Minnesota Secretary of State election =

- November 8, 1966

| Nominee | Joseph L. Donovan | William J. O'Brien |
| Party | Democratic (DFL) | Republican |
| Popular vote | 695,256 | 567,897 |
| Percentage | 55.04% | 44.96% |
- County results Donovan: 50–60% 60–70% 70–80% O'Brien: 50–60% 60–70%
Secretary of State before election
Joseph L. Donovan
Democratic (DFL)
Elected Secretary of State
Joseph L. Donovan
Democratic (DFL)

The 1966 Minnesota Secretary of State election was held on November 8, 1966, in order to elect the Secretary of State of Minnesota. Democratic–Farmer–Labor nominee and incumbent Secretary of State Joseph L. Donovan defeated Republican nominee and incumbent member of the Minnesota House of Representatives for the 45th District William J. O'Brien.

== General election ==
On election day, November 8, 1966, Democratic–Farmer–Labor nominee Joseph L. Donovan won re-election by a margin of 127,359 votes against his opponent Republican nominee William J. O'Brien, thereby retaining Democratic–Farmer–Labor control over the office of Secretary of State. Donovan was sworn in for his sixth term on January 2, 1967.

=== Results ===
Minnesota Secretary of State election, 1966
| Party | Candidate | Votes | % |
|---|---|---|---|
| Democratic (DFL) | Joseph L. Donovan (incumbent) | 695,256 | 55.04 |
| Republican | William J. O'Brien | 567,897 | 44.96 |
| Total votes | | 1,263,153 | 100.00 |
| Democratic (DFL) hold | | | |
