= Felix A. Borer =

Swiss-American attorney and soldier

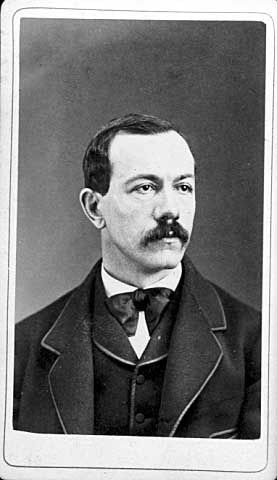
- Borer c. 1875

County Auditor of Le Sueur County, Minnesota
- In office 1876–1883
- Preceded by: John Kinsey
- Succeeded by: Philip Dressel

Register of Deeds of Le Sueur County
- In office 1868–1875

Personal details
- Born: Felix Adolphus Borer; January 1, 1839 Erschwil, Swiss Confederation
- Died: December 10, 1910 (aged 71) Le Sueur, Minnesota, U.S.
- Other political affiliations: Democrat

Military service
- Allegiance: United States
- Branch/service: Union Army
- Years of service: 1862–1865
- Rank: First Lieutenant
- Unit: 7th Minnesota Infantry Regiment
- Battles/wars: American Civil War; Dakota War of 1862; Sibley's 1863 Campaign

Felix Adolphus Borer (January 1, 1839 – December 10, 1910) was a Swiss-American soldier, attorney, and auditor.

== Early life ==
Borer was born on January 1, 1839, in Erschwil in the Swiss Confederation. Borer emigrated to the United States and settled in Le Sueur, Minnesota.

== Military service ==
During the American Civil War Borer enlisted in the Union Army as a Second Lieutenant on September 2, 1862, and was enrolled in Company K in the 7th Minnesota Infantry Regiment. The 7th Minnesota primarily fought the Dakota people during the Dakota War of 1862 and the subsequent 1863 Campaign under General Henry Hastings Sibley in Dakota Territory. Borer was promoted to the rank of First Lieutenant on February 24, 1863, he was discharged with the rest of the regiment in 1865.

== Politics ==
Beginning in 1862 Borer served as a clerk of the district court for Le Sueur County, Minnesota.^{:383} Borer was later elected as the register of deeds of Le Sueur County from 1868 to 1875 and later was elected as the county auditor of Le Sueur County from 1876 to 1883.^{:382}

In 1879 Borer ran unsuccessfully for the office of Minnesota Secretary of State in the 1879 Minnesota Secretary of State election as a Democrat with only 24.9% of the vote, Borer lost to Republican candidate Frederick von Baumbach. In 1882 Borer campaigned for a position in the United States House of Representatives representing District 2 of Minnesota, Borer won 24.97% of the vote, he ultimately lost to Republican candidate James Wakefield.
