= 1990 Minnesota Secretary of State election =

- November 6, 1990
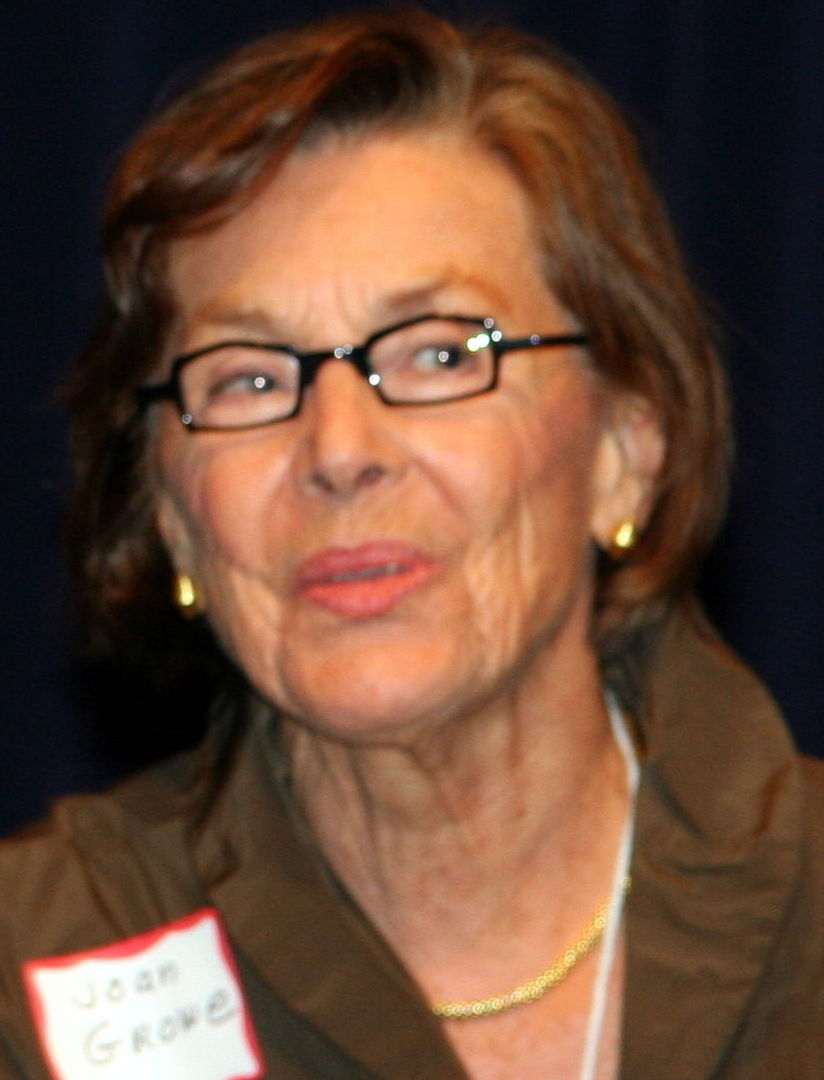

Nominee	Joan Growe	David Jennings
Party	Democratic (DFL)	Ind.-Republican
Popular vote	1,094,696	626,199
Percentage	62.03%	35.49%
- County results Growe: 50–60% 60–70% 70–80% Jennings: 50–60% Tie: 50%
Secretary of State before election
Joan Growe
Democratic (DFL)
Elected Secretary of State
Joan Growe
Democratic (DFL)

The 1990 Minnesota Secretary of State election was held on November 6, 1990, in order to elect the Secretary of State of Minnesota. Democratic–Farmer–Labor nominee and incumbent Secretary of State Joan Growe defeated Independent-Republican nominee David Jennings and Grassroots nominee Candice E. Sjostrom.

== General election ==
On election day, November 6, 1990, Democratic–Farmer–Labor nominee Joan Growe won re-election by a margin of 468,497 votes against her foremost opponent Independent-Republican nominee David Jennings, thereby retaining Democratic–Farmer–Labor control over the office of Secretary of State. Growe was sworn in for her fifth term on January 3, 1991.

=== Results ===
Minnesota Secretary of State election, 1990
Party	Candidate	Votes	%
Democratic (DFL)	Joan Growe (incumbent)	1,094,696	62.03
Ind.-Republican	David Jennings	626,199	35.49
Grassroots	Candice E. Sjostrom	43,812	2.48
Total votes		1,764,707	100.00
Democratic (DFL) hold			
