= 1910 Minnesota Secretary of State election =

- November 8, 1910
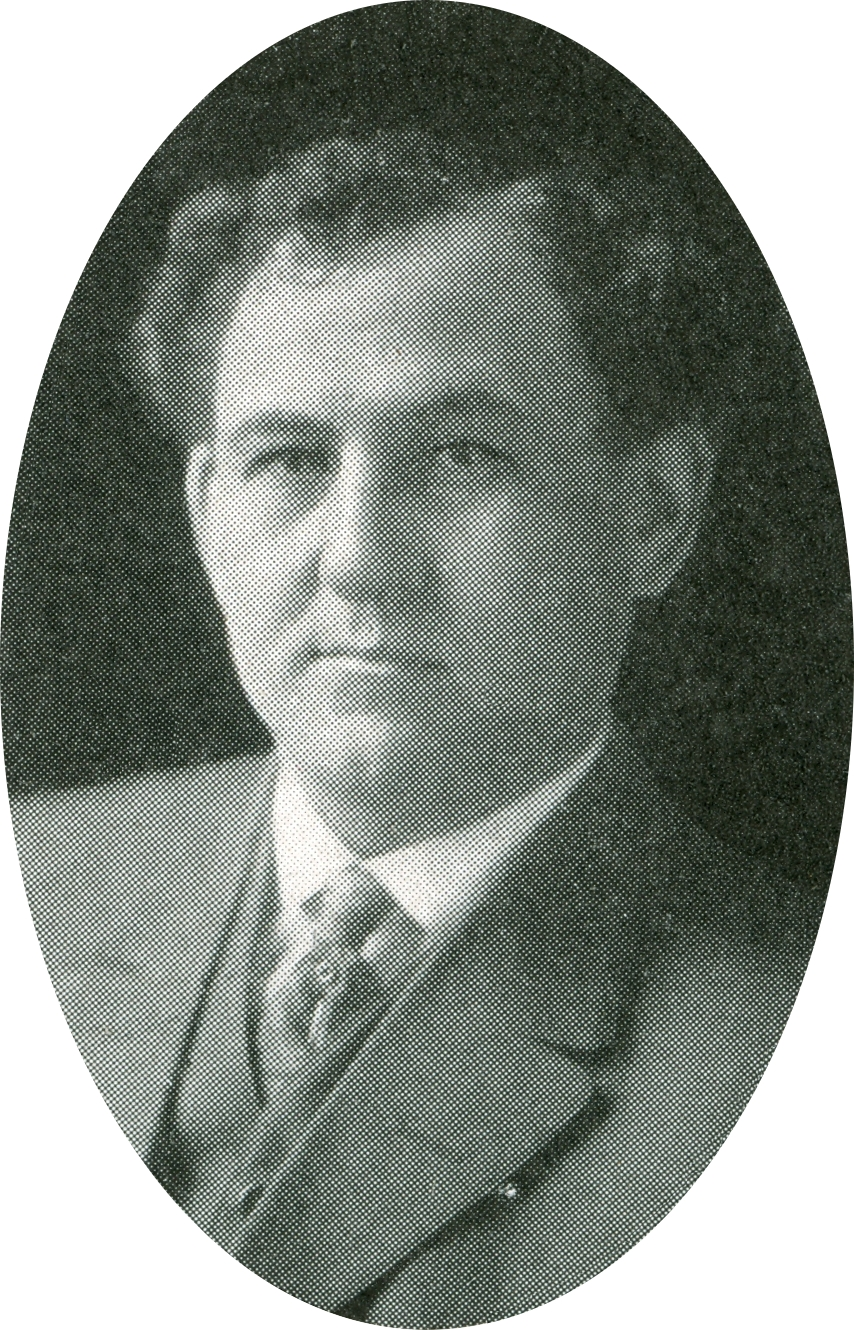

Nominee	Julius A. Schmahl	Fred W. Johnson
Party	Republican	Democratic
Popular vote	153,656	92,608
Percentage	55.32%	33.34%
Nominee	Torkel Hoiland	Frank F. Marzahn
Party	Socialist	Prohibition
Popular vote	17,369	14,148
Percentage	6.25%	5.09%
Secretary of State before election
Julius A. Schmahl
Republican
Elected Secretary of State
Julius A. Schmahl
Republican

The 1910 Minnesota Secretary of State election was held on November 8, 1910, in order to elect the Secretary of State of Minnesota. Republican nominee and incumbent Secretary of State Julius A. Schmahl defeated Democratic nominee Fred W. Johnson, Socialist nominee Torkel Hoiland and Prohibition nominee Frank F. Marzahn.

== General election ==
On election day, November 8, 1910, Republican nominee Julius A. Schmahl won re-election by a margin of 61,048 votes against his foremost opponent Democratic nominee Fred W. Johnson, thereby retaining Republican control over the office of Secretary of State. Schmahl was sworn in for his third term on January 4, 1911.

=== Results ===
Minnesota Secretary of State election, 1910
Party	Candidate	Votes	%
Republican	Julius A. Schmahl (incumbent)	153,656	55.32
Democratic	Fred W. Johnson	92,608	33.34
Socialist	Torkel Hoiland	17,369	6.25
Prohibition	Frank F. Marzahn	14,148	5.09
Total votes		277,781	100.00
Republican hold			
