= 1916 Minnesota Secretary of State election =

- November 7, 1916
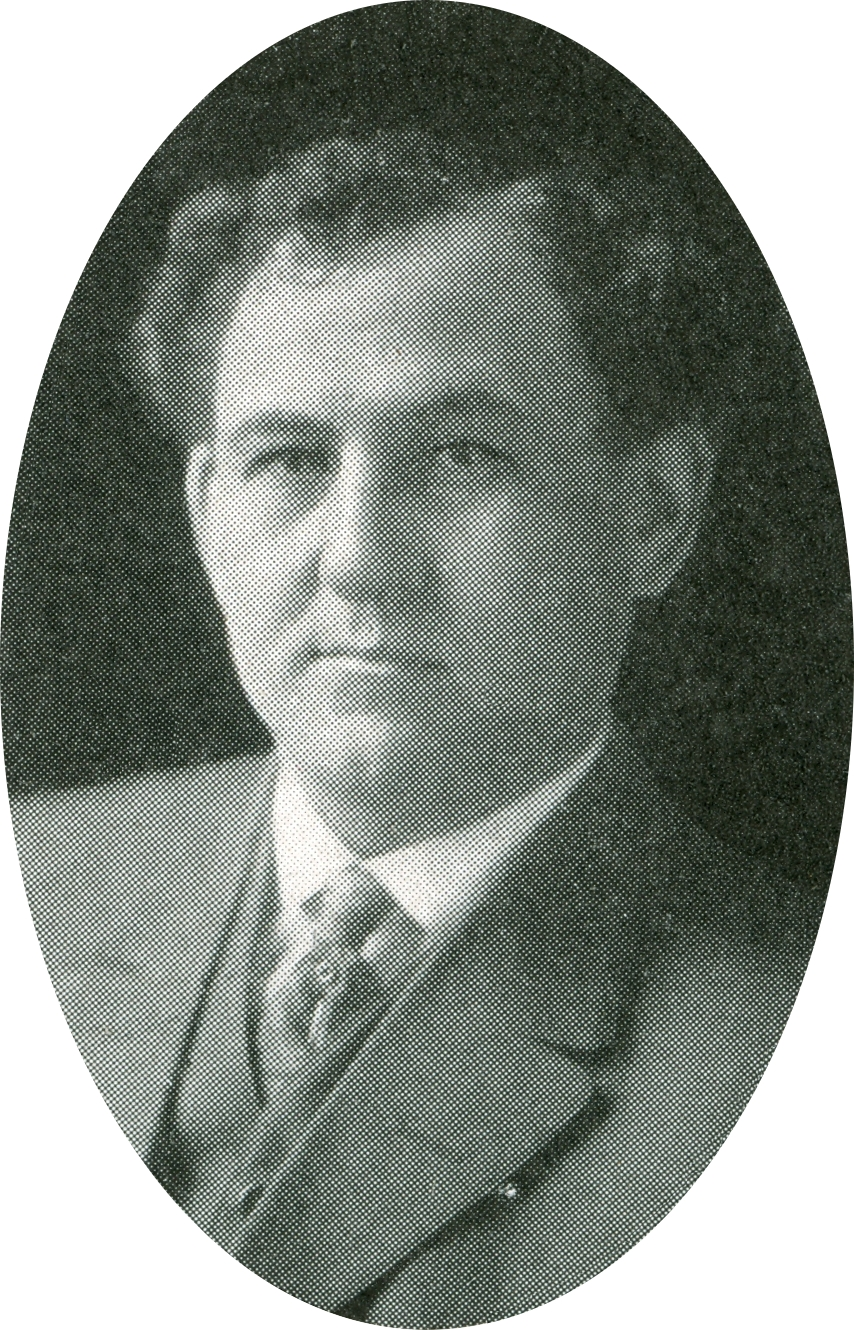

Nominee	Julius A. Schmahl	Charles L. Johnson
Party	Republican	Prohibition
Popular vote	261,292	84,131
Percentage	75.64%	24.36%
Secretary of State before election
Julius A. Schmahl
Republican
Elected Secretary of State
Julius A. Schmahl
Republican

The 1916 Minnesota Secretary of State election was held on November 7, 1916, in order to elect the Secretary of State of Minnesota. Republican nominee and incumbent Secretary of State Julius A. Schmahl defeated Prohibition nominee Charles L. Johnson.

== General election ==
On election day, November 7, 1916, Republican nominee Julius A. Schmahl won re-election by a margin of 177,161 votes against his opponent Prohibition nominee Charles L. Johnson, thereby retaining Republican control over the office of Secretary of State. Schmahl was sworn in for his sixth term on January 3, 1917.

=== Results ===
Minnesota Secretary of State election, 1916
Party	Candidate	Votes	%
Republican	Julius A. Schmahl (incumbent)	261,292	75.64
Prohibition	Charles L. Johnson	84,131	24.36
Total votes		345,423	100.00
Republican hold			
