= 1863 Minnesota Secretary of State election =

- November 3, 1863
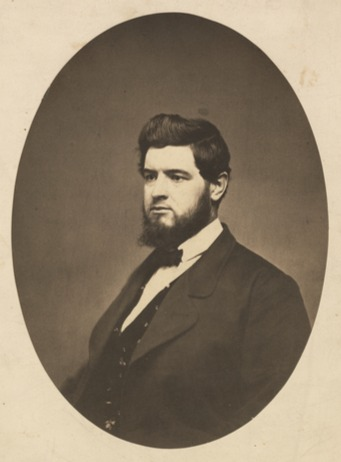

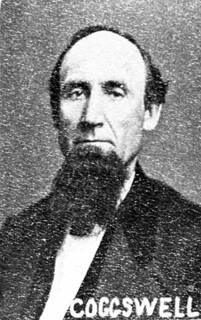
Nominee	David Blakeley	Amos Coggswell
Party	Republican	Democratic
Popular vote	19,643	12,701
Percentage	60.73%	39.27%
Secretary of State before election
David Blakeley (Acting)
Republican
Elected Secretary of State
David Blakeley
Republican

The 1863 Minnesota Secretary of State election was held on November 3, 1863, in order to elect the Secretary of State of Minnesota. Republican nominee and incumbent Acting Secretary of State David Blakeley defeated Democratic nominee and former Speaker of the Minnesota House of Representatives Amos Coggswell.

== General election ==
On election day, November 3, 1863, Republican nominee David Blakeley won the election by a margin of 6,942 votes against his opponent Democratic nominee Amos Coggswell, thereby retaining Republican control over the office of Secretary of State. Blakely was sworn in for his first full term on January 11, 1864.

=== Results ===
Minnesota Secretary of State election, 1863
Party	Candidate	Votes	%
Republican	David Blakeley (incumbent)	19,643	60.73
Democratic	Amos Coggswell	12,701	39.27
Total votes		32,344	100.00
Republican hold			
