= 1914 Minnesota Secretary of State election =

- November 3, 1914
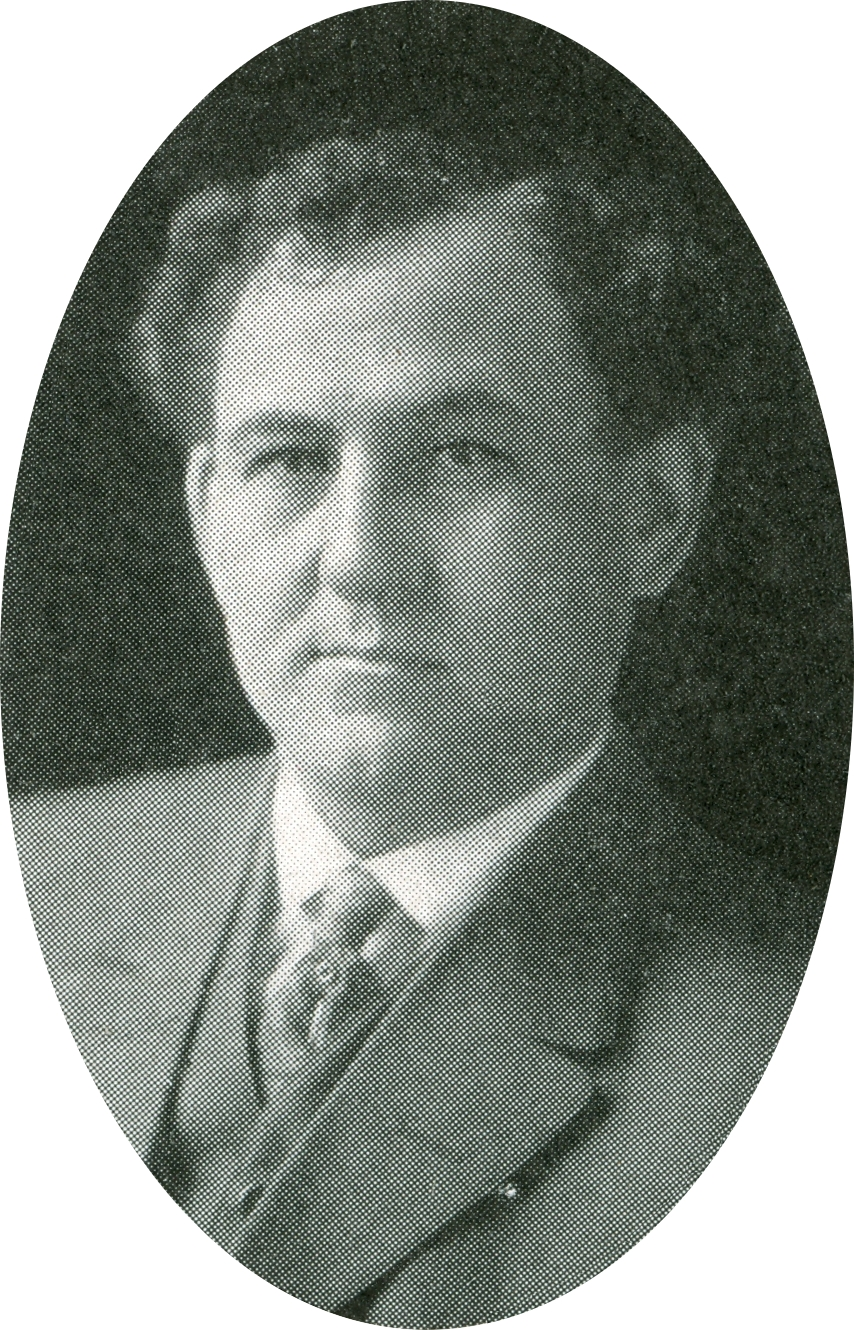

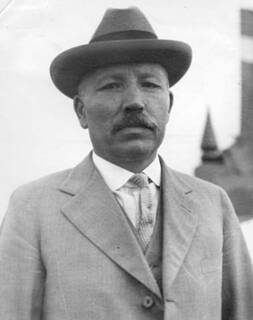

Nominee	Julius A. Schmahl	Nels N. Bergheim
Party	Republican	Democratic
Popular vote	180,070	96,585
Percentage	57.01%	30.58%
Nominee	Iver M. Kalnes	John C. Lewis
Party	Prohibition	Progressive
Popular vote	22,515	16,684
Percentage	7.13%	5.28%
Secretary of State before election
Julius A. Schmahl
Republican
Elected Secretary of State
Julius A. Schmahl
Republican

The 1914 Minnesota Secretary of State election was held on November 3, 1914, in order to elect the Secretary of State of Minnesota. Republican nominee and incumbent Secretary of State Julius A. Schmahl defeated Democratic nominee Nels N. Bergheim, Prohibition nominee Iver M. Kalnes and Progressive nominee John C. Lewis.

== General election ==
On election day, November 3, 1914, Republican nominee Julius A. Schmahl won re-election by a margin of 83,485 votes against his foremost opponent Democratic nominee Nels N. Bergheim, thereby retaining Republican control over the office of Secretary of State. Schmahl was sworn in for his fifth term on January 3, 1915.

=== Results ===
Minnesota Secretary of State election, 1914
Party	Candidate	Votes	%
Republican	Julius A. Schmahl (incumbent)	180,070	57.01
Democratic	Nels N. Bergheim	96,585	30.58
Prohibition	Iver M. Kalnes	22,515	7.13
Progressive	John C. Lewis	16,684	5.28
Total votes		315,854	100.00
Republican hold			
