= 1883 Minnesota Secretary of State election =

- November 6, 1883
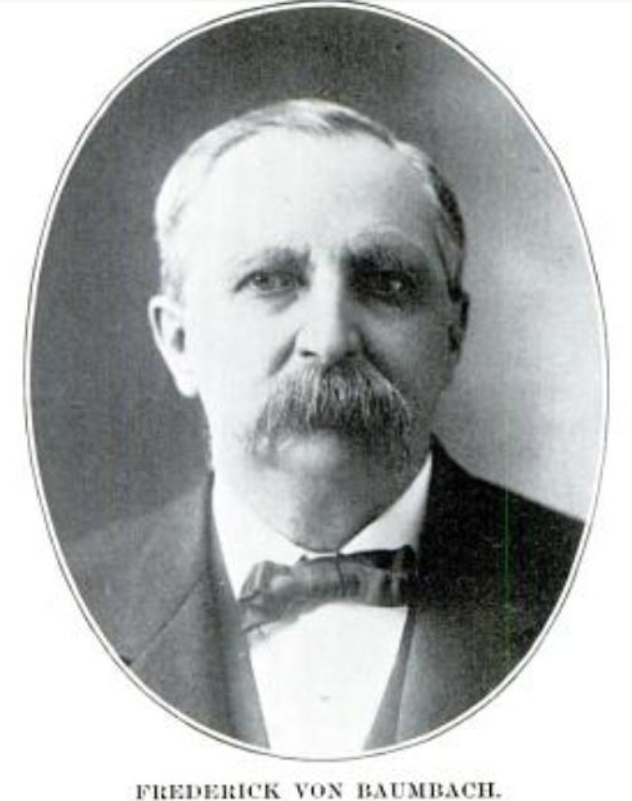

Nominee	Frederick Von Baumbach	James J. Green
Party	Republican	Democratic
Popular vote	79,960	51,027
Percentage	58.86%	37.56%
Secretary of State before election
Frederick Von Baumbach
Republican
Elected Secretary of State
Frederick Von Baumbach
Republican

The 1883 Minnesota Secretary of State election was held on November 6, 1883, in order to elect the Secretary of State of Minnesota. Republican nominee and incumbent Secretary of State Frederick Von Baumbach defeated Democratic nominee James J. Green and Prohibition nominee Edwin G. Paine.

== General election ==
On election day, November 6, 1883, Republican nominee Frederick Von Baumbach won re-election by a margin of 28,933 votes against his foremost opponent Democratic nominee James J. Green, thereby retaining Republican control over the office of Secretary of State. Von Baumbach was sworn in for his third term on January 10, 1884.

=== Results ===
Minnesota Secretary of State election, 1883
Party	Candidate	Votes	%
Republican	Frederick Von Baumbach (incumbent)	79,960	58.86
Democratic	James J. Green	51,027	37.56
Prohibition	Edwin G. Paine	4,795	3.53
Write-in		78	0.05
Total votes		135,860	100.00
Republican hold			
