= 1908 Minnesota Secretary of State election =

- November 3, 1908
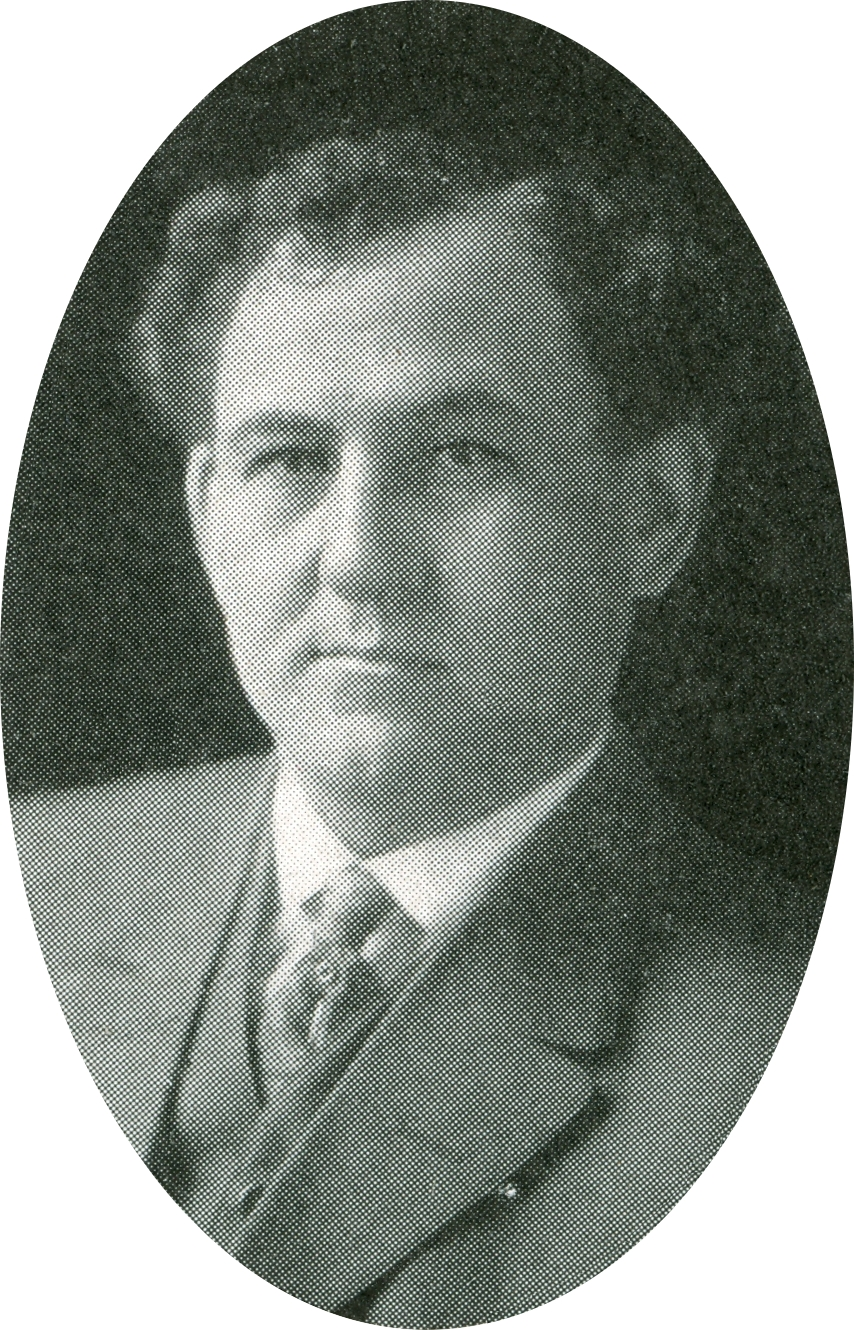

Nominee	Julius A. Schmahl	Richard F. Lamb	James F. Damon
Party	Republican	Democratic	Prohibition
Popular vote	175,465	96,561	15,216
Percentage	58.45%	32.17%	5.07%
Secretary of State before election
Julius A. Schmahl
Republican
Elected Secretary of State
Julius A. Schmahl
Republican

The 1908 Minnesota Secretary of State election was held on November 3, 1908, in order to elect the Secretary of State of Minnesota. Republican nominee and incumbent Secretary of State Julius A. Schmahl defeated Democratic nominee Richard F. Lamb, Prohibition nominee James F. Damon, Socialist nominee John LeFevre and Independence League nominee J.S. Waterston.

== General election ==
On election day, November 3, 1908, Republican nominee Julius A. Schmahl won re-election by a margin of 78,904 votes against his foremost opponent Democratic nominee Richard F. Lamb, thereby retaining Republican control over the office of Secretary of State. Schmahl was sworn in for his second term on January 4, 1909.

=== Results ===
Minnesota Secretary of State election, 1908
Party	Candidate	Votes	%
Republican	Julius A. Schmahl (incumbent)	175,465	58.45
Democratic	Richard F. Lamb	96,561	32.17
Prohibition	James F. Damon	15,216	5.07
Socialist	John LeFevre	10,939	3.64
Independence	J.S. Waterston	2,024	0.67
Total votes		300,205	100.00
Republican hold			
