= 1912 Minnesota Secretary of State election =

- November 5, 1912
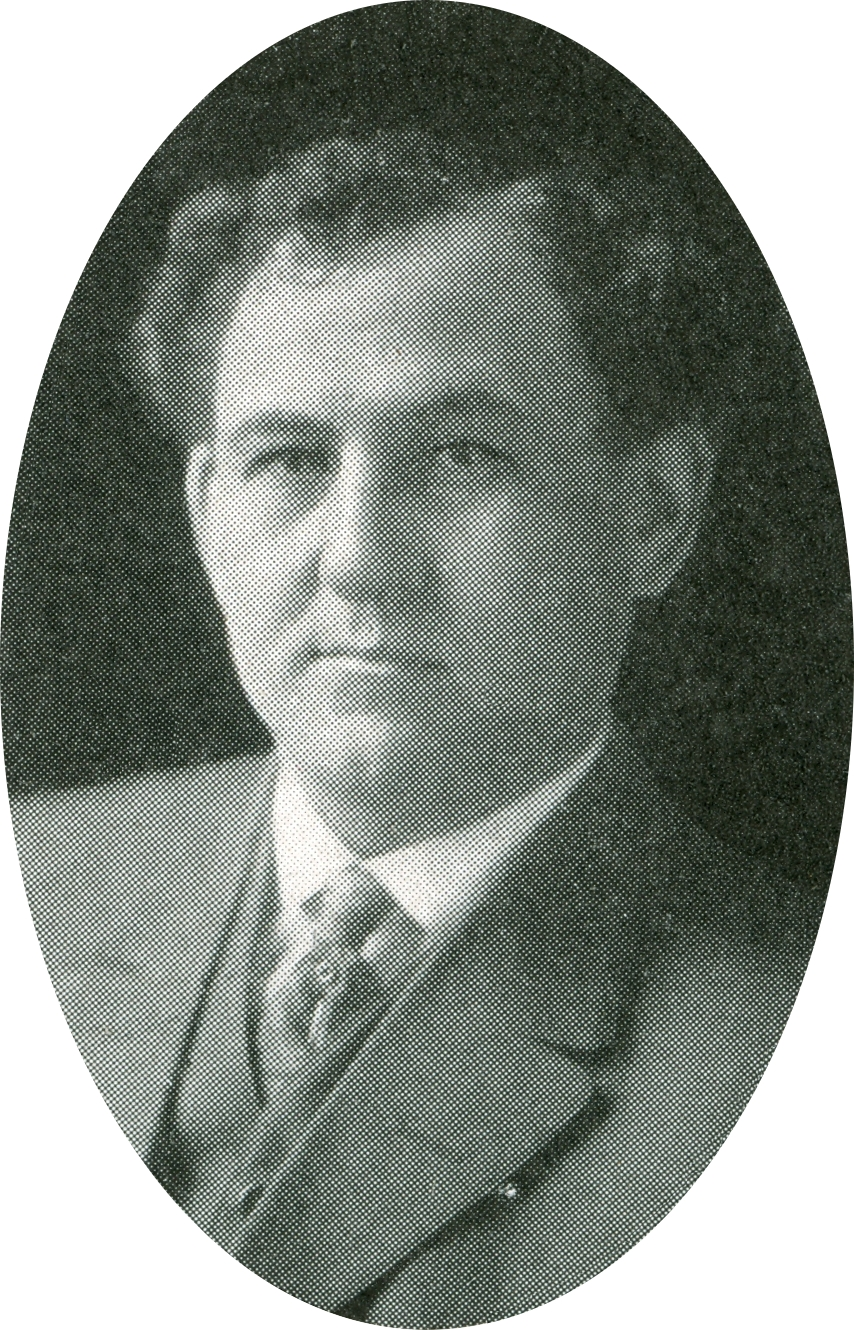

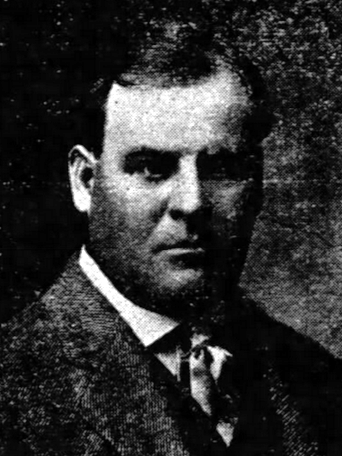

Nominee	Julius A. Schmahl	Harvey W. Grimmer	John Alvin Johnson
Party	Republican	Democratic	Socialist
Popular vote	147,293	72,328	32,602
Percentage	49.25%	24.19%	10.90%
Nominee	Marion S. Norelius	Charles L. Johnson
Party	Progressive	Prohibition
Popular vote	26,790	20,025
Percentage	8.96%	6.70%
Secretary of State before election
Julius A. Schmahl
Republican
Elected Secretary of State
Julius A. Schmahl
Republican

The 1912 Minnesota Secretary of State election was held on November 5, 1912, in order to elect the Secretary of State of Minnesota. Republican nominee and incumbent Secretary of State Julius A. Schmahl defeated Democratic nominee Harvey W. Grimmer, Socialist nominee John Alvin Johnson, Progressive nominee Marion S. Norelius and Prohibition nominee Charles L. Johnson.

== General election ==
On election day, November 5, 1912, Republican nominee Julius A. Schmahl won re-election by a margin of 74,965 votes against his foremost opponent Democratic nominee Harvey W. Grimmer, thereby retaining Republican control over the office of Secretary of State. Schmahl was sworn in for his fourth term on January 3, 1913.

=== Results ===
Minnesota Secretary of State election, 1912
Party	Candidate	Votes	%
Republican	Julius A. Schmahl (incumbent)	147,293	49.25
Democratic	Harvey W. Grimmer	72,328	24.19
Socialist	John Alvin Johnson	32,602	10.90
Progressive	Marion S. Norelius	26,790	8.96
Prohibition	Charles L. Johnson	20,025	6.70
Total votes		299,038	100.00
Republican hold			
