= 1958 Minnesota Secretary of State election =

- November 4, 1958

Nominee	Joseph L. Donovan	L. C. Andersen
Party	Democratic (DFL)	Republican
Popular vote	654,137	476,525
Percentage	57.85%	42.15%
- County results Donovan: 50–60% 60–70% 70–80% Andersen: 50–60% 60–70%
Secretary of State before election
Joseph L. Donovan
Democratic (DFL)
Elected Secretary of State
Joseph L. Donovan
Democratic (DFL)

The 1958 Minnesota Secretary of State election was held on November 4, 1958, in order to elect the Secretary of State of Minnesota. Democratic–Farmer–Labor nominee and incumbent Secretary of State Joseph L. Donovan defeated Republican nominee L. C. Andersen.

== General election ==
On election day, November 4, 1958, Democratic–Farmer–Labor nominee Joseph L. Donovan won re-election by a margin of 177,612 votes against his opponent Republican nominee L. C. Andersen, thereby retaining Democratic–Farmer–Labor control over the office of Secretary of State. Donovan was sworn in for his third term on January 5, 1959.

=== Results ===
Minnesota Secretary of State election, 1958
Party	Candidate	Votes	%
Democratic (DFL)	Joseph L. Donovan (incumbent)	654,137	57.85
Republican	L. C. Andersen	476,525	42.15
Total votes		1,130,662	100.00
Democratic (DFL) hold			
