= 1982 Minnesota Secretary of State election =

- November 2, 1982
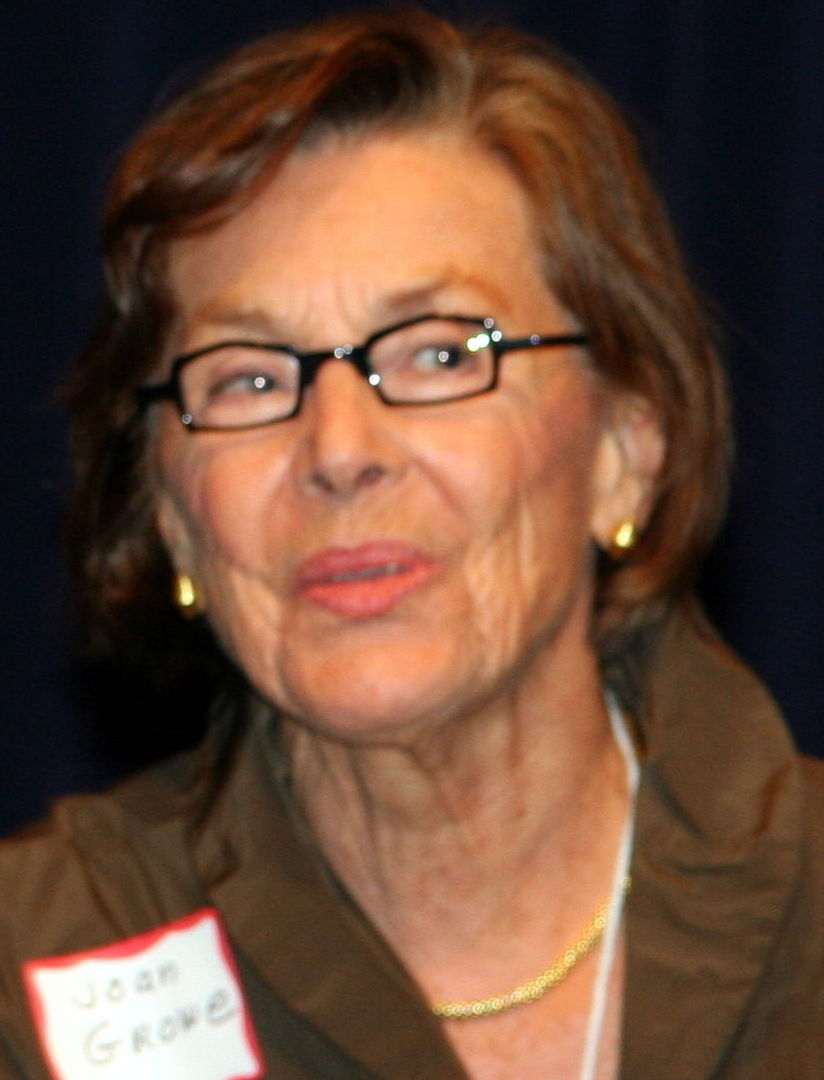

Nominee	Joan Growe	Mark Hanson
Party	Democratic (DFL)	Ind.-Republican
Popular vote	1,028,792	673,011
Percentage	59.36%	38.83%
- County results Growe: 40–50% 50–60% 60–70% 70–80% Hanson: 40–50% 50–60%
Secretary of State before election
Joan Growe
Democratic (DFL)
Elected Secretary of State
Joan Growe
Democratic (DFL)

The 1982 Minnesota Secretary of State election was held on November 2, 1982, in order to elect the Secretary of State of Minnesota. Democratic–Farmer–Labor nominee and incumbent Secretary of State Joan Growe defeated Independent-Republican nominee Mark Hanson and Libertarian nominee Linda Taylor.

== General election ==
On election day, November 2, 1982, Democratic–Farmer–Labor nominee Joan Growe won re-election by a margin of 355,781 votes against her foremost opponent Independent-Republican nominee Mark Hanson, thereby retaining Democratic–Farmer–Labor control over the office of Secretary of State. Growe was sworn in for her third term on January 3, 1983.

=== Results ===
Minnesota Secretary of State election, 1982
Party	Candidate	Votes	%
Democratic (DFL)	Joan Growe (incumbent)	1,028,792	59.36
Ind.-Republican	Mark Hanson	673,011	38.83
Libertarian	Linda Taylor	31,422	1.81
Total votes		1,733,225	100.00
Democratic (DFL) hold			
