= Lake Mina =

Lake in Minnesota

- Location within Minnesota
- Location: Douglas County, Minnesota
- Coordinates: 45°53′29″N 95°28′34″W
- Type: lake

Lake Mina is a lake in Douglas County, in the U.S. state of Minnesota.

Lake Mina was named for the mother of Frederick von Baumbach, an early settler and afterward Minnesota Secretary of State, and the latter for whom Baumbach Lake also was named.

== See also ==
- List of lakes in Minnesota
