= Borer Lake =

Lake in the state of Minnesota, United States

- Location within Minnesota
- Location: Le Sueur County, Minnesota
- Coordinates: 44°24′34″N 93°38′34″W
- Type: lake

Borer Lake is a lake in Le Sueur County, in the U.S. state of Minnesota.

Borer Lake was named for Felix A. Borer, a county auditor.
