= 1960 Minnesota Secretary of State election =

- November 8, 1960

Nominee	Joseph L. Donovan	Kenneth O'Brien Joyce
Party	Democratic (DFL)	Republican
Popular vote	891,421	612,190
Percentage	59.29%	40.71%
- County results Donovan: 50–60% 60–70% 70–80% 80–90% Joyce: 50–60%
Secretary of State before election
Joseph L. Donovan
Democratic (DFL)
Elected Secretary of State
Joseph L. Donovan
Democratic (DFL)

The 1960 Minnesota Secretary of State election was held on November 8, 1960, in order to elect the Secretary of State of Minnesota. Democratic–Farmer–Labor nominee and incumbent Secretary of State Joseph L. Donovan defeated Republican nominee Kenneth O'Brien Joyce.

== General election ==
On election day, November 8, 1960, Democratic–Farmer–Labor nominee Joseph L. Donovan won re-election by a margin of 279,231 votes against his opponent Republican nominee Kenneth O'Brien Joyce, thereby retaining Democratic–Farmer–Labor control over the office of Secretary of State. Donovan was sworn in for his fourth term on January 3, 1961.

=== Results ===
Minnesota Secretary of State election, 1960
Party	Candidate	Votes	%
Democratic (DFL)	Joseph L. Donovan (incumbent)	891,421	59.29
Republican	Kenneth O'Brien Joyce	612,190	40.71
Total votes		1,503,611	100.00
Democratic (DFL) hold			
