= 1902 Minnesota Secretary of State election =

- November 4, 1902
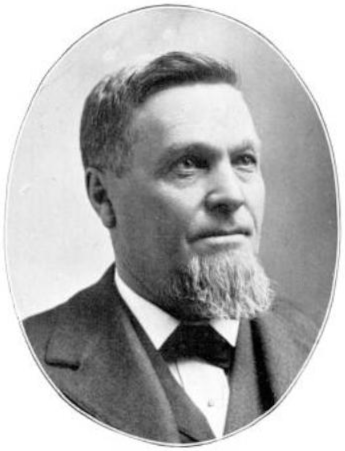

Nominee	Peter E. Hanson	Spurgeon Odell
Party	Republican	Democratic
Popular vote	159,165	83,181
Percentage	60.38%	31.55%
Secretary of State before election
Peter E. Hanson
Republican
Elected Secretary of State
Peter E. Hanson
Republican

The 1902 Minnesota Secretary of State election was held on November 4, 1902, in order to elect the Secretary of State of Minnesota. Republican nominee and incumbent Secretary of State Peter E. Hanson defeated Democratic nominee Spurgeon Odell, People's nominee Charles T. Lanman, Prohibition nominee William W. Loveless and Socialist nominee Bircham F. Morledge.

== General election ==
On election day, November 4, 1902, Republican nominee Peter E. Hanson won re-election by a margin of 75,984 votes against his foremost opponent Democratic nominee Spurgeon Odell, thereby retaining Republican control over the office of Secretary of State. Hanson was sworn in for his second term on January 7, 1903.

=== Results ===
Minnesota Secretary of State election, 1902
Party	Candidate	Votes	%
Republican	Peter E. Hanson (incumbent)	159,165	60.38
Democratic	Spurgeon Odell	83,181	31.55
Populist	Charles T. Lanman	8,315	3.15
Prohibition	William W. Loveless	7,653	2.90
Socialist	Bircham F. Morledge	5,303	2.02
Total votes		263,617	100.00
Republican hold			
