= 1994 Minnesota Secretary of State election =

- November 8, 1994
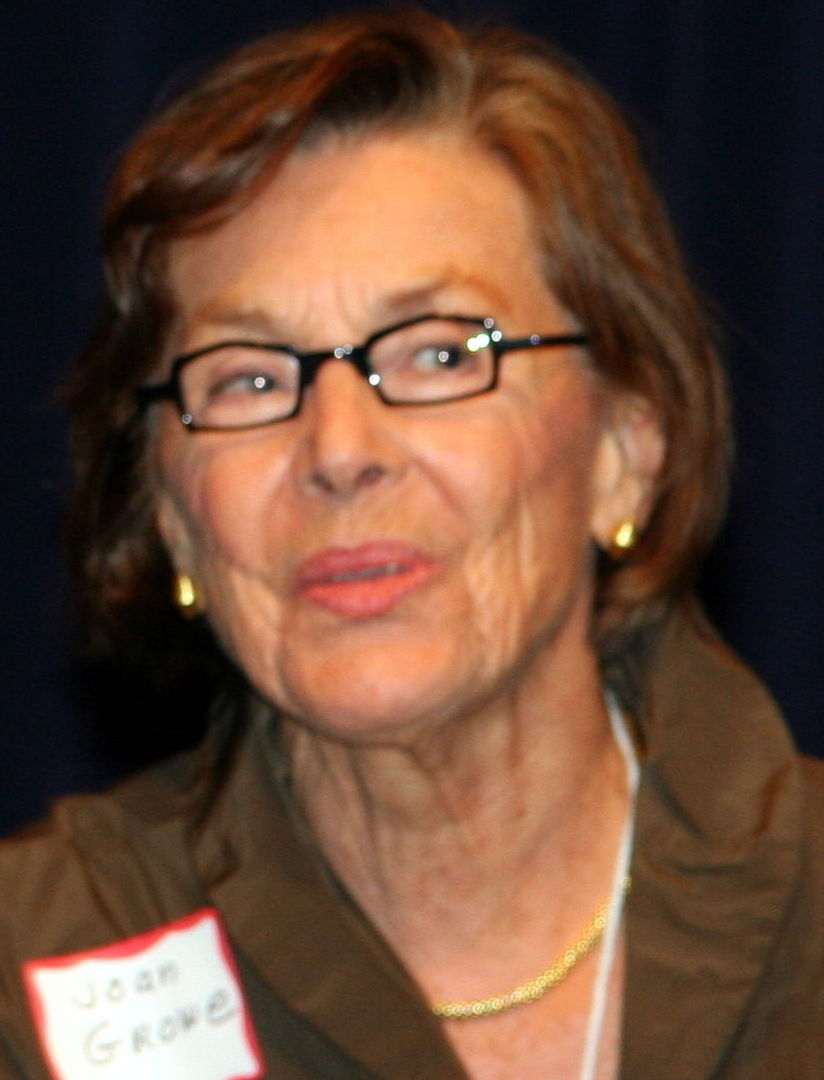

Nominee	Joan Growe	Richard Kimbler
Party	Democratic (DFL)	Ind.-Republican
Popular vote	1,038,455	636,676
Percentage	60.06%	36.82%
- County results Growe: 40–50% 50–60% 60–70% 70–80%
Secretary of State before election
Joan Growe
Democratic (DFL)
Elected Secretary of State
Joan Growe
Democratic (DFL)

The 1994 Minnesota Secretary of State election was held on November 8, 1994, in order to elect the Secretary of State of Minnesota. Democratic–Farmer–Labor nominee and incumbent Secretary of State Joan Growe defeated Independent-Republican nominee Richard Kimbler and Grassroots nominee Dale D. Wilkinson.

== General election ==
On election day, November 8, 1994, Democratic–Farmer–Labor nominee Joan Growe won re-election by a margin of 401,779 votes against her foremost opponent Independent-Republican nominee Richard Kimbler, thereby retaining Democratic–Farmer–Labor control over the office of Secretary of State. Growe was sworn in for her sixth term on January 3, 1995.

=== Results ===
Minnesota Secretary of State election, 1994
Party	Candidate	Votes	%
Democratic (DFL)	Joan Growe (incumbent)	1,038,455	60.06
Ind.-Republican	Richard Kimbler	636,676	36.82
Grassroots	Dale D. Wilkinson	54,009	3.12
Total votes		1,729,140	100.00
Democratic (DFL) hold			
