= 1962 Minnesota Secretary of State election =

- November 6, 1962

| Nominee | Joseph L. Donovan | Norbert A. McCrady |
| Party | Democratic (DFL) | Republican |
| Popular vote | 729,561 | 494,344 |
| Percentage | 59.61% | 40.39% |
- County results Donovan: 50–60% 60–70% 70–80% McCrady: 50–60% 60–70%
Secretary of State before election
Joseph L. Donovan
Democratic (DFL)
Elected Secretary of State
Joseph L. Donovan
Democratic (DFL)

The 1962 Minnesota Secretary of State election was held on November 6, 1962, in order to elect the Secretary of State of Minnesota. Democratic–Farmer–Labor nominee and incumbent Secretary of State Joseph L. Donovan defeated Republican nominee Norbert A. McCrady. This was the first election for a four-year term following the passage of a constitutional amendment in 1958 that provided four-year terms for all state constitutional officers.

== General election ==
On election day, November 6, 1962, Democratic–Farmer–Labor nominee Joseph L. Donovan won re-election by a margin of 235,217 votes against his opponent Republican nominee Norbert A. McCrady, thereby retaining Democratic–Farmer–Labor control over the office of Minnesota Secretary of State. Donovan was sworn in for his fifth term on January 8, 1963.

=== Results ===
Minnesota Secretary of State election, 1962
| Party | Candidate | Votes | % |
|---|---|---|---|
| Democratic (DFL) | Joseph L. Donovan (incumbent) | 729,561 | 59.61 |
| Republican | Norbert A. McCrady | 494,344 | 40.39 |
| Total votes | | 1,223,905 | 100.00 |
| Democratic (DFL) hold | | | |
