= 1974 Minnesota Secretary of State election =

- November 5, 1974

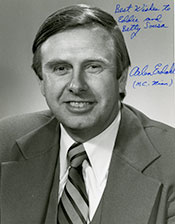
Nominee	Joan Growe	Arlen Erdahl
Party	Democratic (DFL)	Republican
Popular vote	640,948	548,786
Percentage	52.31%	44.79%
- County results Growe: 40–50% 50–60% 60–70% Erdahl: 40–50% 50–60% 60–70%
Secretary of State before election
Arlen Erdahl
Republican
Elected Secretary of State
Joan Growe
Democratic (DFL)

The 1974 Minnesota Secretary of State election was held on November 5, 1974, in order to elect the Secretary of State of Minnesota. Democratic–Farmer–Labor nominee and incumbent member of the Minnesota House of Representatives Joan Growe defeated Republican nominee and incumbent Secretary of State Arlen Erdahl and American Party nominee Daniel J. Slater.

== General election ==
On election day, November 5, 1974, Democratic–Farmer–Labor nominee Joan Growe won the election by a margin of 92,162 votes against her foremost opponent Republican nominee Arlen Erdahl, thereby gaining Democratic–Farmer–Labor control over the office of Secretary of State. Growe was sworn in as the 19th Minnesota Secretary of State on January 6, 1975.

=== Results ===
Minnesota Secretary of State election, 1974
Party	Candidate	Votes	%
Democratic (DFL)	Joan Growe	640,948	52.31
Republican	Arlen Erdahl (incumbent)	548,786	44.79
American	Daniel J. Slater	35,571	2.90
Total votes		1,225,305	100.00
Democratic (DFL) gain from Republican			
