= 1904 Minnesota Secretary of State election =

- November 8, 1904
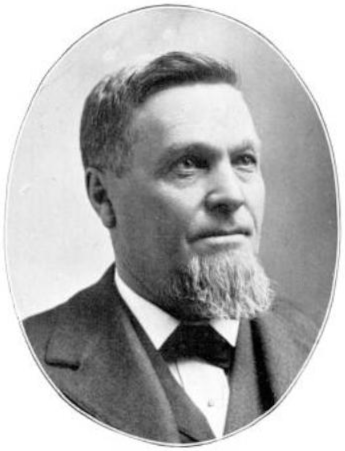

Nominee	Peter E. Hanson	John E. King
Party	Republican	Democratic
Popular vote	181,706	85,050
Percentage	63.35%	29.65%
Secretary of State before election
Peter E. Hanson
Republican
Elected Secretary of State
Peter E. Hanson
Republican

The 1904 Minnesota Secretary of State election was held on November 8, 1904, in order to elect the Secretary of State of Minnesota. Republican nominee and incumbent Secretary of State Peter E. Hanson defeated Democratic nominee John E. King, Socialist nominee J. Edward Carlson and Prohibition nominee Hendrick A. Rygh.

== General election ==
On election day, November 8, 1904, Republican nominee Peter E. Hanson won re-election by a margin of 96,656 votes against his foremost opponent Democratic nominee John E. King, thereby retaining Republican control over the office of Secretary of State. Hanson was sworn in for his third term on January 7, 1905.

=== Results ===
Minnesota Secretary of State election, 1904
Party	Candidate	Votes	%
Republican	Peter E. Hanson (incumbent)	181,706	63.35
Democratic	John E. King	85,050	29.65
Socialist	J. Edward Carlson	10,235	3.57
Prohibition	Hendrick A. Rygh	9,839	3.43
Total votes		286,830	100.00
Republican hold			
