= 1881 Minnesota Secretary of State election =

- November 8, 1881
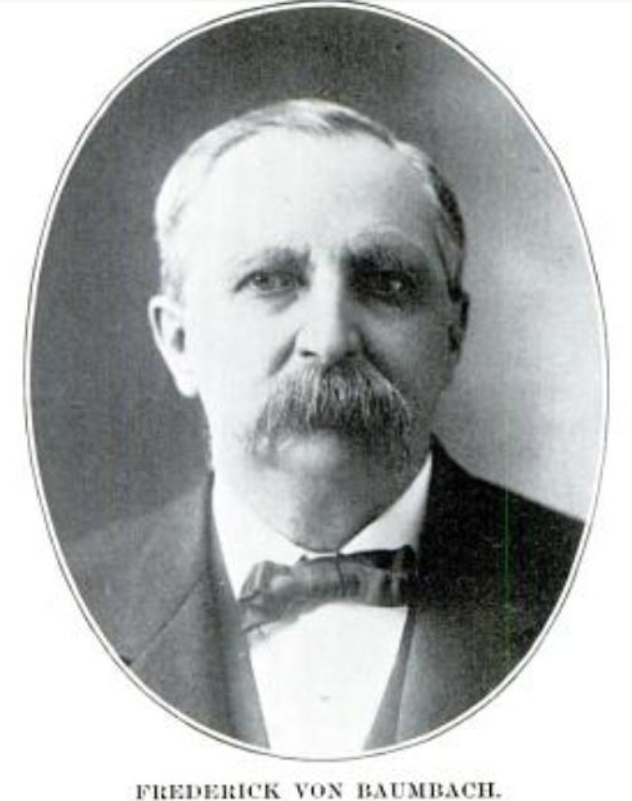

Nominee	Frederick Von Baumbach	Alfred J. Lamberton
Party	Republican	Democratic
Popular vote	66,284	36,170
Percentage	62.69%	34.21%
Secretary of State before election
Frederick Von Baumbach
Republican
Elected Secretary of State
Frederick Von Baumbach
Republican

The 1881 Minnesota Secretary of State election was held on November 8, 1881, in order to elect the Secretary of State of Minnesota. Republican nominee and incumbent Secretary of State Frederick Von Baumbach defeated Democratic nominee Alfred J. Lamberton, Greenback nominee George C. Chamberlain and Prohibition nominee William W. Regan.

== General election ==
On election day, November 8, 1881, Republican nominee Frederick Von Baumbach won re-election by a margin of 30,114 votes against his foremost opponent Democratic nominee Alfred J. Lamberton, thereby retaining Republican control over the office of Secretary of State. Von Baumbach was sworn in for his second term on January 10, 1882.

=== Results ===
Minnesota Secretary of State election, 1881
Party	Candidate	Votes	%
Republican	Frederick Von Baumbach (incumbent)	66,284	62.69
Democratic	Alfred J. Lamberton	36,170	34.21
Greenback	George C. Chamberlain	2,542	2.40
Prohibition	William W. Regan	734	0.70
Total votes		105,730	100.00
Republican hold			
