= 1918 Minnesota Secretary of State election =

- November 5, 1918
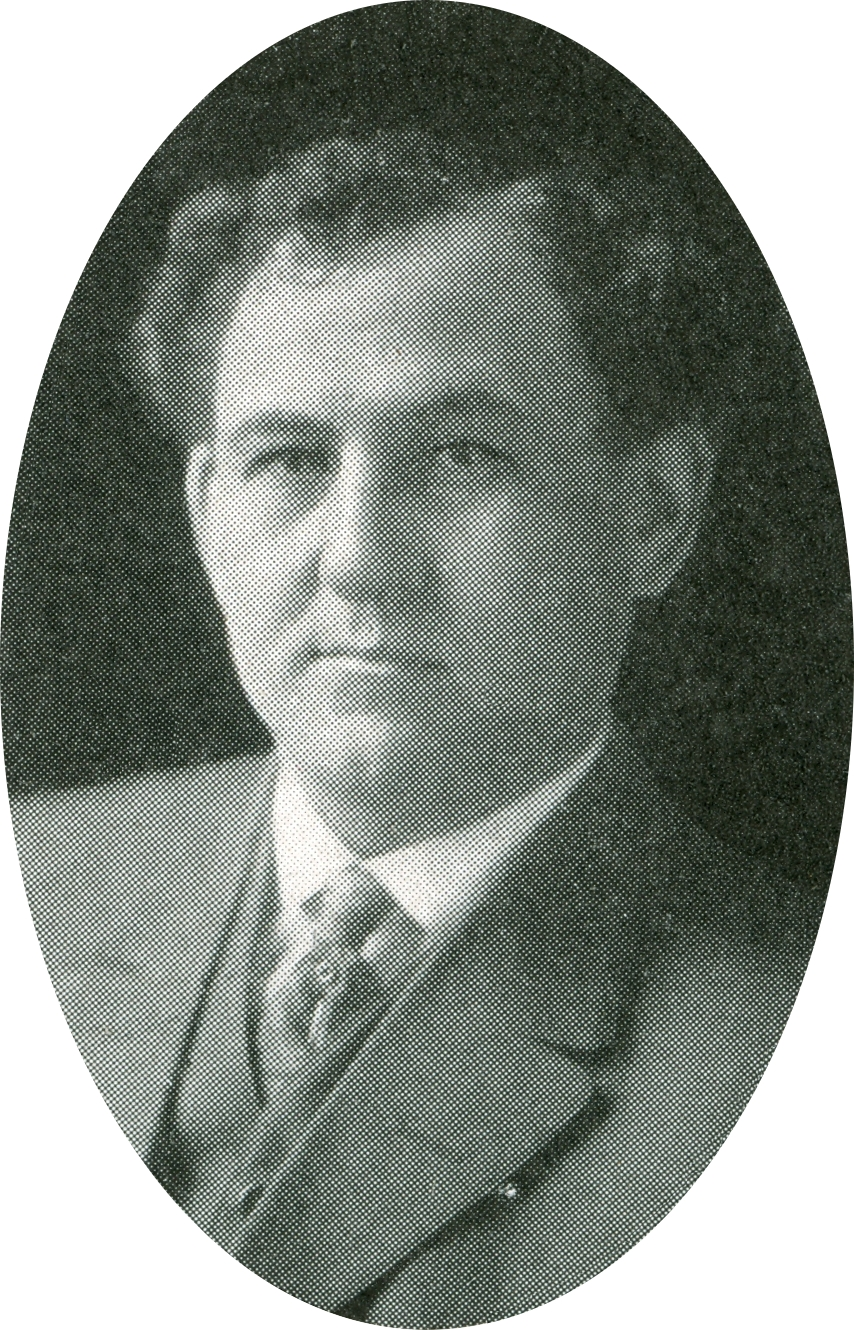

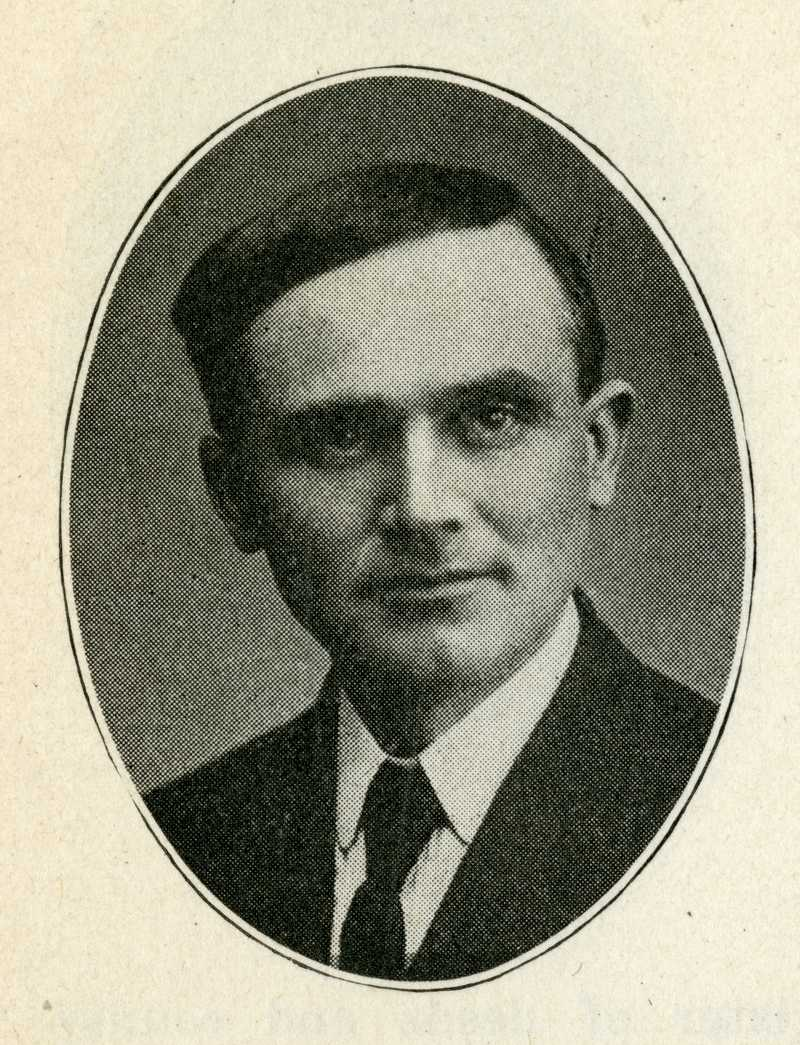
Nominee	Julius A. Schmahl	Edward Indrehus
Party	Republican	Democratic
Popular vote	218,414	127,145
Percentage	63.21%	36.79%
Secretary of State before election
Julius A. Schmahl
Republican
Elected Secretary of State
Julius A. Schmahl
Republican

The 1918 Minnesota Secretary of State election was held on November 5, 1918, in order to elect the Secretary of State of Minnesota. Republican nominee and incumbent Secretary of State Julius A. Schmahl defeated Democratic nominee and incumbent member of the Minnesota House of Representatives Edward Indrehus.

== General election ==
On election day, November 5, 1918, Republican nominee Julius A. Schmahl won re-election by a margin of 91,269 votes against his opponent Democratic nominee Edward Indrehus, thereby retaining Republican control over the office of Secretary of State. Schmahl was sworn in for his seventh term on January 3, 1919.

=== Results ===
Minnesota Secretary of State election, 1918
Party	Candidate	Votes	%
Republican	Julius A. Schmahl (incumbent)	218,414	63.21
Democratic	Edward Indrehus	127,145	36.79
Total votes		345,559	100.00
Republican hold			
