= 1970 Minnesota Secretary of State election =

- November 3, 1970
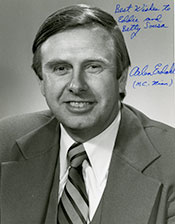

Nominee	Arlen Erdahl	Daniel D. Donovan
Party	Republican	Democratic (DFL)
Popular vote	667,294	657,153
Percentage	50.38%	49.62%
- County results Erdahl: 50–60% 60–70% Donovan: 50–60% 60–70% 70–80%
Secretary of State before election
Joseph L. Donovan
Democratic (DFL)
Elected Secretary of State
Arlen Erdahl
Republican

The 1970 Minnesota Secretary of State election was held on November 3, 1970, in order to elect the Secretary of State of Minnesota. Republican nominee and incumbent member of the Minnesota House of Representatives Arlen Erdahl defeated Democratic–Farmer–Labor nominee Daniel D. Donovan.

== General election ==
On election day, November 3, 1970, Republican nominee Arlen Erdahl won the election by a margin of 10,141 votes against his opponent Democratic–Farmer–Labor nominee Daniel D. Donovan, thereby gaining Republican control over the office of Secretary of State. Erdahl was sworn in as the 18th Minnesota Secretary of State on January 4, 1971.

=== Results ===
Minnesota Secretary of State election, 1970
Party	Candidate	Votes	%
Republican	Arlen Erdahl	667,294	50.38
Democratic (DFL)	Daniel D. Donovan	657,153	49.62
Total votes		1,324,447	100.00
Republican gain from Democratic (DFL)			
