= 1986 Minnesota Secretary of State election =

- November 4, 1986
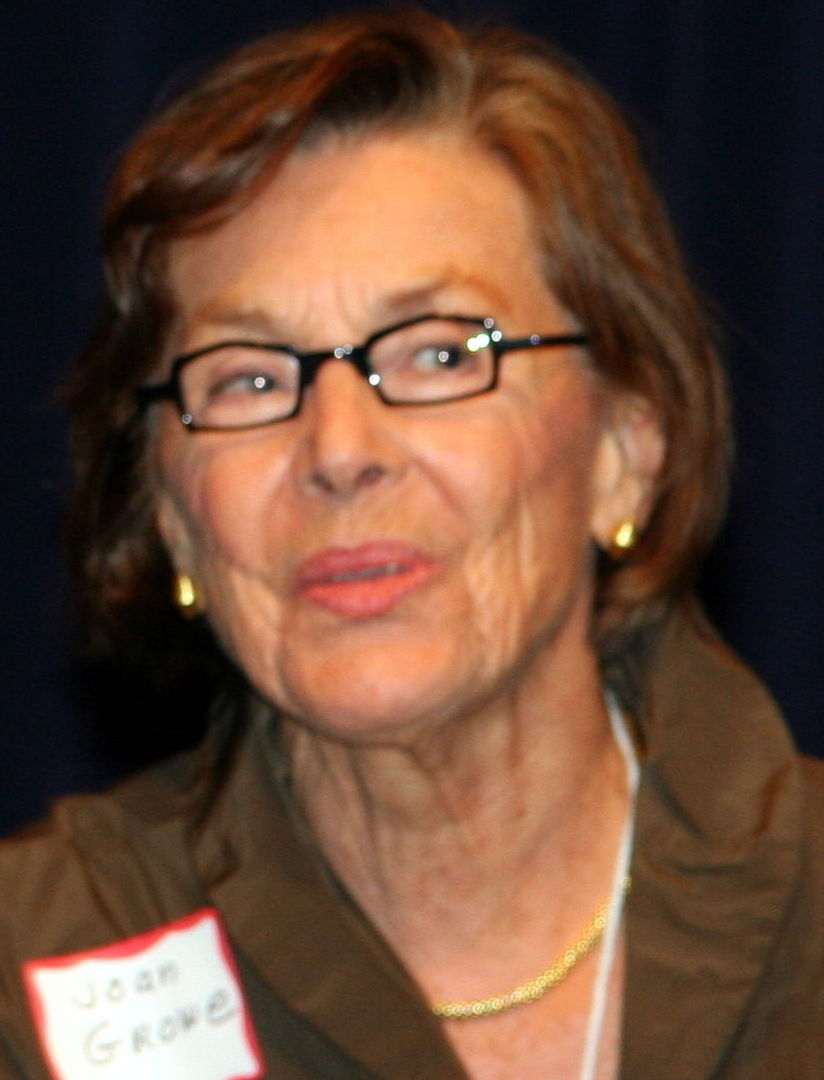

Nominee	Joan Growe	Don Koenig
Party	Democratic (DFL)	Ind.-Republican
Popular vote	911,977	459,927
Percentage	66.48%	33.52%
- County results Growe: 50–60% 60–70% 70–80% 80–90%
Secretary of State before election
Joan Growe
Democratic (DFL)
Elected Secretary of State
Joan Growe
Democratic (DFL)

The 1986 Minnesota Secretary of State election was held on November 4, 1986, in order to elect the Secretary of State of Minnesota. Democratic–Farmer–Labor nominee and incumbent Secretary of State Joan Growe defeated Independent-Republican nominee Don Koenig.

== General election ==
On election day, November 4, 1986, Democratic–Farmer–Labor nominee Joan Growe won re-election by a margin of 452,050 votes against her opponent Independent-Republican nominee Don Koenig, thereby retaining Democratic–Farmer–Labor control over the office of Secretary of State. Growe was sworn in for her fourth term on January 3, 1987.

=== Results ===
Minnesota Secretary of State election, 1986
Party	Candidate	Votes	%
Democratic (DFL)	Joan Growe (incumbent)	911,977	66.48
Ind.-Republican	Don Koenig	459,927	33.52
Total votes		1,371,904	100.00
Democratic (DFL) hold			
