= Gerald Brekke =

American politician (1922–2006)

Gerald Wayne Brekke (September 1, 1922 – March 28, 2006) was a Minnesota politician and educator who ran unsuccessfully for the United States Senate in 1976, Minnesota Secretary of State in 1978, and United States House of Representatives in 2000. He was Assistant Director of Special Projects in the Office of Overseas Dependent Education for the United States Department of Defense from 1974-1975, an appointment made by President Gerald Ford.

Brekke was a Professor of Education at Gustavus Adolphus College from 1962 to 1987, where he taught thousands of students and established the Minnesota Student Teachers' Association. After retiring, he became a general contractor, building over forty homes for low-income families in Saint Peter, Minnesota. Brekke served in the 8th Army Air Corps during World War II, where he was a reporter for the Stars and Stripes newspaper. Brekke earned his bachelor's degree from Concordia College in Moorhead, master's degree from the University of Southern California, and Ed.D. from the University of North Dakota.

Party political offices
Preceded by Clark MacGregor	Republican nominee for U.S. Senator from Minnesota (Class 1); 1976	Succeeded by David Durenberger
Preceded by Arlen Erdahl	Republican nominee for Minnesota Secretary of State; 1978	Succeeded by Mark Hanson
