= 1896 Minnesota Secretary of State election =

- November 3, 1896
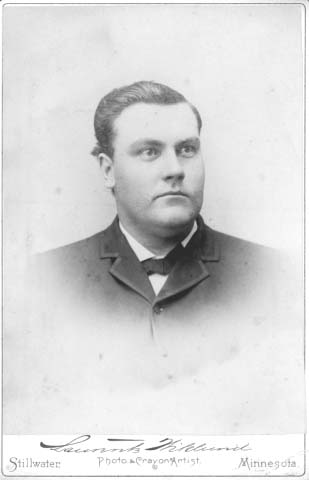

Nominee	Albert Berg	Julius J. Heinrich
Party	Republican	Democratic
Popular vote	183,211	137,459
Percentage	55.86%	41.91%
Secretary of State before election
Albert Berg
Republican
Elected Secretary of State
Albert Berg
Republican

The 1896 Minnesota Secretary of State election was held on November 3, 1896, in order to elect the Secretary of State of Minnesota. Republican nominee and incumbent Secretary of State Albert Berg defeated Democratic nominee Julius J. Heinrich and Prohibition nominee James A. McConkey.

== General election ==
On election day, November 3, 1896, Republican nominee Albert Berg won re-election by a margin of 45,752 votes against his foremost opponent Democratic nominee Julius J. Heinrich, thereby retaining Republican control over the office of Secretary of State. Berg was sworn in for his second term on January 3, 1897.

=== Results ===
Minnesota Secretary of State election, 1896
Party	Candidate	Votes	%
Republican	Albert Berg (incumbent)	183,211	55.86
Democratic	Julius J. Heinrich	137,459	41.91
Prohibition	James A. McConkey	7,307	2.23
Total votes		327,977	100.00
Republican hold			
