= Albert Berg (politician) =

American politician (1861 – 1920)

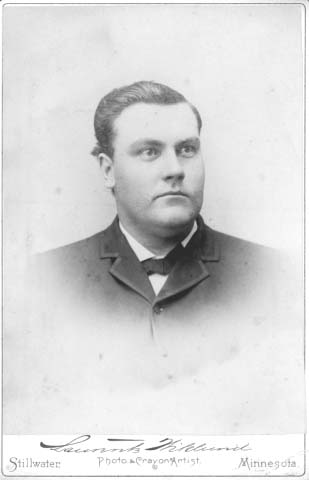
- Berg c.1895

11th Minnesota Secretary of State
- In office January 7, 1895 – January 7, 1901
- Governor: David Marston Clough; John Lind
- Preceded by: Frederick P. Brown
- Succeeded by: Peter E. Hanson

Member of the Minnesota House of Representatives from the 63rd District
- In office January 7, 1901 – January 4, 1903

Personal details
- Born: Albert Fredric Berg; June 25, 1861 Center City, Minnesota, U.S.
- Died: February 13, 1920 (aged 58) Saint Paul, Minnesota, U.S.
- Resting place: Chisago Lake Cemetery, Center City, Minnesota, U.S.
- Other political affiliations: Republican
- Education: Carleton College (1877–1878); Gustavus Adolphus College (1878–1880)

Albert Fredric Berg (June 25, 1861 – February 13, 1920) was a Swedish-American farmer, educator, and politician. Berg served three terms as the eleventh Minnesota Secretary of State from 1895 to 1901 and a single term in the Minnesota House of Representatives from 1901 to 1903.

== Early life and career ==
Berg was born on June 25, 1861, in Center City, Minnesota to parents Jonas Berg and Anna Maria Berg. Berg attended both public and parochial school in Chisago County before studying at Carleton College in Northfield, Minnesota from 1877 to 1878 and Gustavus Adolphus College in St. Peter, Minnesota from 1878 to 1880. Berg worked for the Daily Argus newspaper of Fargo, North Dakota from 1879 until 1884. From 1884 to 1886 He was employed as a teacher for Chisago County schools.

Berg began his political career in 1886 when he became register of deeds for Chisago County, an office he held until 1894. He ran for Minnesota Secretary of State in the 1894 Minnesota Secretary of State election as a Republican against Minnesota Democratic Party candidate Charles J. Haines, Populist Party candidate Peter J. Seberger, and Prohibition Party candidate Charles Winger. Berg won 52.71% of the vote with a 28.85% margin of victory. He was re-elected in 1896 and 1898, serving a total of six years under Governors David Marston Clough and John Lind. He was succeeded by Peter E. Hanson.

Following his career as Minnesota Secretary of State, Berg served a single term in the Minnesota House of Representatives as a Republican for Minnesota's 63th District, representing Kittson County, Marshall County, and Roseau County. He later worked as a cashier and was director of the State Bank of Warroad in Warroad, Minnesota from 1904 to 1906. Berg died on February 13, 1920, at the age of 58 of pneumonia at the Mounds Park Sanitarium in Saint Paul, Minnesota.
