= 1898 Minnesota Secretary of State election =

- November 8, 1898
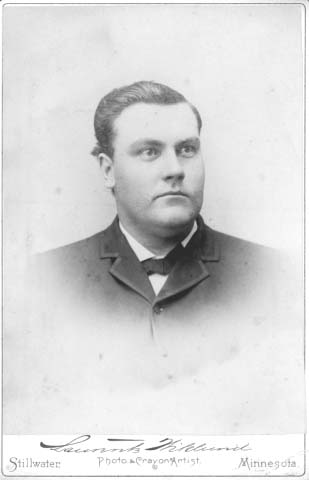

Nominee	Albert Berg	Julius J. Heinrich
Party	Republican	Democratic
Popular vote	136,687	96,765
Percentage	55.39%	39.21%
Secretary of State before election
Albert Berg
Republican
Elected Secretary of State
Albert Berg
Republican

The 1898 Minnesota Secretary of State election was held on November 8, 1898, in order to elect the Secretary of State of Minnesota. Republican nominee and incumbent Secretary of State Albert Berg defeated Democratic nominee Julius J. Heinrich, Prohibition nominee Archibald A. Stone and People's nominee Michael F. Wesenberg.

== General election ==
On election day, November 8, 1898, Republican nominee Albert Berg won re-election by a margin of 39,922 votes against his foremost opponent Democratic nominee Julius J. Heinrich, thereby retaining Republican control over the office of Secretary of State. Berg was sworn in for his third term on January 3, 1899.

=== Results ===
Minnesota Secretary of State election, 1898
Party	Candidate	Votes	%
Republican	Albert Berg (incumbent)	136,687	55.39
Democratic	Julius J. Heinrich	96,765	39.21
Prohibition	Archibald A. Stone	8,725	3.54
Populist	Michael F. Wesenberg	4,608	1.86
Total votes		246,785	100.00
Republican hold			
