= 1894 Minnesota Secretary of State election =

- November 6, 1894
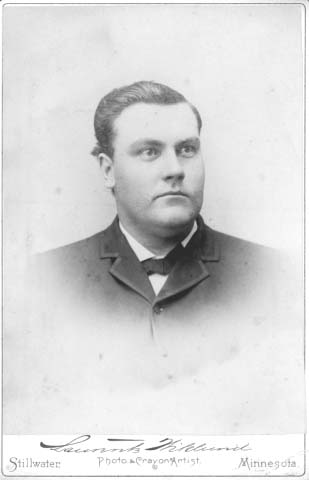

Nominee	Albert Berg	Charles J. Haines	Peter J. Seberger
Party	Republican	Democratic	Populist
Popular vote	152,701	69,102	58,614
Percentage	52.71%	23.85%	20.23%
Secretary of State before election
Frederick P. Brown
Republican
Elected Secretary of State
Albert Berg (politician)
Republican

The 1894 Minnesota Secretary of State election was held on November 6, 1894, in order to elect the Secretary of State of Minnesota. Republican nominee Albert Berg defeated Democratic nominee Charles J. Haines, People's nominee Peter J. Seberger and Prohibition nominee Charles O. Winger.

== General election ==
On election day, November 6, 1894, Republican nominee Albert Berg won the election by a margin of 83,599 votes against his foremost opponent Democratic nominee Charles J. Haines, thereby retaining Republican control over the office of Secretary of State. Berg was sworn in as the 11th Minnesota Secretary of State on January 31, 1895.

=== Results ===
Minnesota Secretary of State election, 1894
Party	Candidate	Votes	%
Republican	Albert Berg	152,701	52.71
Democratic	Charles J. Haines	69,102	23.85
Populist	Peter J. Seberger	58,614	20.23
Prohibition	Charles O. Winger	9,306	3.21
Total votes		289,723	100.00
Republican hold			
