= 1976 United States Senate election in Minnesota =

- November 2, 1976
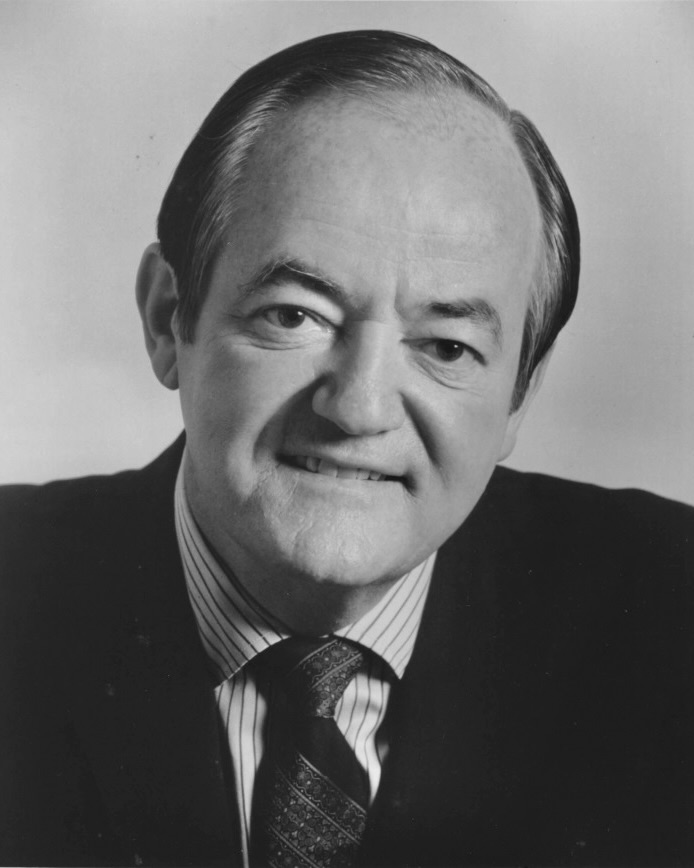

Nominee	Hubert Humphrey	Jerry Brekke	Paul Helm
Party	Democratic (DFL)	Ind.-Republican	American
Popular vote	1,290,736	478,602	125,612
Percentage	67.51%	25.03%	6.57%
- County results Humphrey: 50–60% 60–70% 70–80% 80–90%
U.S. senator before election
Hubert H. Humphrey
Democratic (DFL)
Elected U.S. Senator
Hubert H. Humphrey
Democratic (DFL)

The 1976 United States Senate election in Minnesota took place on November 2, 1976. Incumbent Democratic U.S. Senator Hubert Humphrey won re-election to a fifth term. This is the last U.S. Senate election in which a candidate won all of Minnesota's 87 counties.

Humphrey would die in office a little over a year later in January 1978.

== Democratic–Farmer–Labor primary ==
=== Candidates ===
==== Declared ====
- Dick Bullock
- Hubert H. Humphrey, Incumbent U.S. Senator since 1971, Democratic nominee for President in 1968, former Vice President of the United States (1965–1969), former U.S. Senator (1949–1964)

=== Results ===
Democratic primary election results
Party	Candidate	Votes	%
Democratic (DFL)	Hubert H. Humphrey (incumbent)	317,632	91.3%
Democratic (DFL)	Dick Bullock	30,262	8.7%
Total votes		347,894	100.0%

== Independent-Republican primary ==
=== Candidates ===
==== Declared ====
- Jerry Brekke, College professor
- Richard "Dick" Franson
- John H. Glover
- Bea Mooney
- Roland "Butch" Riemers

=== Results ===
Republican primary election results
Party	Candidate	Votes	%
Ind.-Republican	Jerry Brekke	76,183	54.5%
Ind.-Republican	Richard "Dick" Franson	32,115	23.0%
Ind.-Republican	John H. Glover	13,014	9.3%
Ind.-Republican	Roland "Butch" Riemers	9,307	6.7%
Ind.-Republican	Bea Mooney	9,150	6.5%
Total votes		139,769	100.0%

== General election ==
=== Results ===
County Results of the American Party: Helm: 0-2.5%; 2.5-5%; 5-7.5%; 7.5-10%; 10-12.5%; 12.5-15%; 15-17.5%; 17.5-20%

General election results
Party	Candidate	Votes	%
Democratic (DFL)	Hubert H. Humphrey (incumbent)	1,290,736	67.51%
Ind.-Republican	Jerry Brekke	478,602	25.03%
American	Paul Helm	125,612	6.57%
Socialist Workers	Bill Peterson	9,380	0.49%
Libertarian	Robin E. Miller	5,476	0.29%
Communist	Matt Savola	2,214	0.12%
Total votes		1,912,029	100.00%
Majority		686,522	35.91%
Turnout		1,912,029	90.55%
Democratic (DFL) hold			

== See also ==
- 1976 United States Senate elections
