= 1956 Minnesota Secretary of State election =

- November 6, 1956

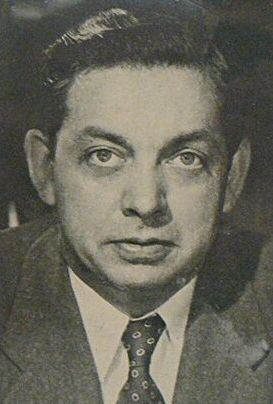
Nominee	Joseph L. Donovan	C. Elmer Anderson
Party	Democratic (DFL)	Republican
Popular vote	723,739	670,278
Percentage	51.92%	48.08%
- County results Donovan: 50–60% 60–70% 70–80% Anderson: 50–60% 60–70%
Secretary of State before election
Joseph L. Donovan
Democratic (DFL)
Elected Secretary of State
Joseph L. Donovan
Democratic (DFL)

The 1956 Minnesota Secretary of State election was held on Tuesday November 6, to elect the Minnesota Secretary of State. Democratic–Farmer–Labor candidate and incumbent Minnesota secretary of state Joseph L. Donovan defeated Republican candidate and former governor of Minnesota. C. Elmer Anderson.

== General election ==
On election day, November 6, 1956, Democratic–Farmer–Labor nominee Joseph L. Donovan won re-election by a margin of 53,461 votes against his opponent Republican nominee C. Elmer Anderson, thereby retaining Democratic–Farmer–Labor control over the office of secretary of state. Donovan was sworn in for his second term on January 7, 1957.

=== Results ===
Minnesota Secretary of State election, 1956
Party	Candidate	Votes	%
Democratic (DFL)	Joseph L. Donovan (incumbent)	723,739	51.92
Republican	C. Elmer Anderson	670,278	48.08
Total votes		1,394,017	100.00
Democratic (DFL) hold			
