= Arlen Erdahl =

American politician (1931–2023)

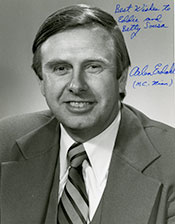

Member of the U.S. House of Representatives from Minnesota's 1st district
- In office January 3, 1979 – January 3, 1983
- Preceded by: Al Quie
- Succeeded by: Tim Penny

18th Secretary of State of Minnesota
- In office January 4, 1971 – January 5, 1975
- Governor: Wendell R. Anderson
- Preceded by: Joseph L. Donovan
- Succeeded by: Joan Growe

Member of the Minnesota House of Representatives
- In office January 8, 1963 – January 4, 1971

Personal details
- Born: Arlen Ingolf Erdahl; February 27, 1931 Blue Earth, Minnesota, U.S.
- Died: September 21, 2023 (aged 92) Minneapolis, Minnesota, U.S.
- Party: Republican
- Spouse: Ellen Marie Syrdal (m. 1958; died 2023)
- Children: 6

Arlen Ingolf Erdahl (February 27, 1931 – September 21, 2023) was an American farmer and politician from Minnesota. A member of the Republican Party, he served as a member of the Minnesota House of Representatives from 1963 to 1971, the 18th Minnesota secretary of state from 1971 to 1975, and as a U.S. representative from Minnesota's 1st congressional district for two terms between 1979 and 1983.

Erdahl later had presidential appointments to serve as Country Director and later associate director for the Peace Corps from 1983 to 1989 and as Principal Deputy/Acting Assistant Secretary for International Affairs at the U.S. Department of Energy from 1989 to 1993. He served on the boards of the United Nations Association of Minnesota, Nobel Peace Prize Forum, Minnesota chapter of People to People, Minneapolis Lodge of the Sons of Norway, and Growth & Justice. In 1999, Erdahl received the Twin Cities International Citizen Award, and in 2011 he was recognized for his public leadership and service with the Hubert H. Humphrey Public Leadership Award by the Humphrey School of Public Affairs at the University of Minnesota.

== Early life ==
Arlen Ingolf Erdahl and his twin brother Lowell were born in Blue Earth, Minnesota, to a Norwegian-born mother and a father of Norwegian descent. He attended public schools in Faribault County. Erdahl graduated from St. Olaf College with a bachelor's degree in 1953, and later earned an MPA in 1966 from Harvard University. He served in the U.S. Army from 1954 to 1956. Before entering politics, Erdahl worked as a grain and livestock farmer in Blue Earth.

== Political career ==
Erdahl served in the Minnesota House of Representatives from 1963 to 1970, caucusing with the conservatives in the officially nonpartisan legislature. He was narrowly elected as Minnesota Secretary of State in 1970, serving from 1971 to 1975. He ran for reelection in 1974, but lost to State Representative Joan Growe, who would hold the office for 24 years. From 1975 to 1978, Erdahl served on the Minnesota Public Service Commission. Then he served in the United States House of Representatives from 1979 to 1983.

Erdahl's cousin, Dale Erdahl, succeeded him in the Minnesota House of Representatives when Arlen vacated his seat in 1970 to become secretary of state.

=== Congress ===
In 1978, Erdahl ran to serve as U.S. Representative from Minnesota's 1st congressional district. The incumbent, Al Quie, retired after 20 years to successfully run for governor of Minnesota. Erdahl defeated the Democratic nominee, Gerry Sikorski, by a margin of 56%–43% to be elected to Congress. Erdahl was easily reelected in 1980. In 1982, however, reapportionment led Erdahl to run in Minnesota's 6th congressional district, losing in a rematch to Sikorski by a narrow margin of 51%–49%.

== Later career and legacy ==
In April 2011, he was recognized for his public leadership and service with the Hubert H. Humphrey Public Leadership Award by the Humphrey School of Public Affairs at the University of Minnesota.

The Arlen Ingolf Erdahl collection at the Southern Minnesota Historical Center, Memorial Library at the Minnesota State University, Mankato contains materials about his seven years in the Minnesota House of Representatives and his campaign for Minnesota Secretary of State in 1970.

=== Death ===
Arlen Erdahl died in Minneapolis on September 21, 2023, at age of 92, after suffering from Alzheimer's disease in his later years.

Party political offices
Preceded by William O'Brien	Republican nominee for Minnesota Secretary of State; 1970, 1974	Succeeded by Gerald Brekke
Political offices
Preceded by Joseph L. Donovan	Secretary of State of Minnesota; 1971–1975	Succeeded by Joan Growe
U.S. House of Representatives
Preceded by Al Quie	Member of the U.S. House of Representatives from Minnesota's 1st congressional district 1979–1983	Succeeded by Tim Penny
