= 1857 Minnesota Secretary of State election =

- October 13, 1857
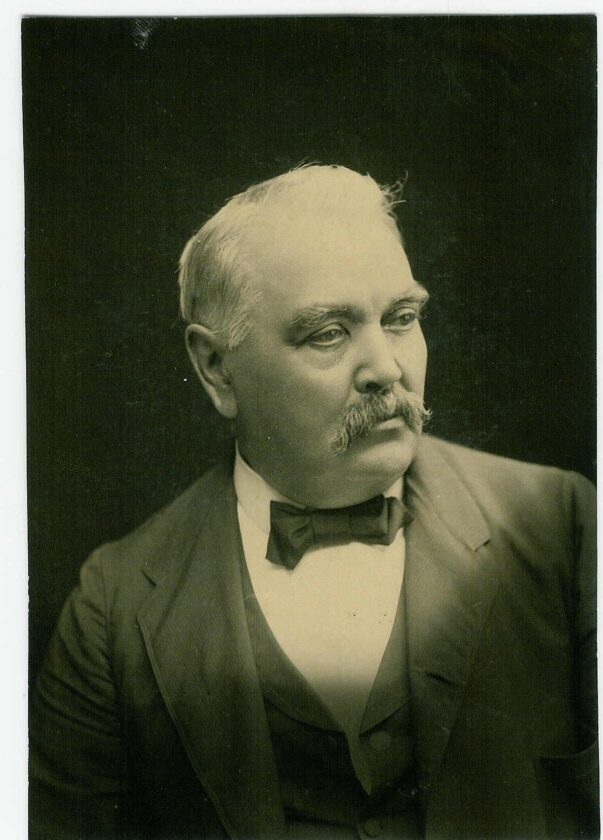

Nominee	Francis Baasen	Lucius Stannard
Party	Democratic	Republican
Popular vote	18,172	17,113
Percentage	51.50%	48.50%
Secretary of State before election
Charles L. Chase (Territorial)
Democratic
Elected Secretary of State
Francis Baasen
Democratic

The 1857 Minnesota secretary of state election was held on October 13, 1857, in order to elect the first secretary of state of Minnesota upon Minnesota acquiring statehood on May 11, 1858. Democratic nominee Francis Baasen defeated Republican nominee Lucius Stannard.

== General election ==
On election day, October 13, 1857, Democratic nominee Francis Baasen won the election by a margin of 1,059 votes against his opponent Republican nominee Lucius Stannard, thereby retaining Democratic control over the office of secretary of state. Baasen was sworn in as the 1st Minnesota secretary of state on May 11, 1858.

=== Results ===
Minnesota Secretary of State election, 1857
Party	Candidate	Votes	%
Democratic	Francis Baasen	18,172	51.50
Republican	Lucius Stannard	17,113	48.50
Total votes		35,285	100.00
Democratic hold			
