= 2006 Minnesota Secretary of State election =

- November 7, 2006
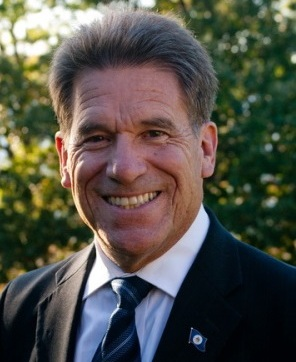

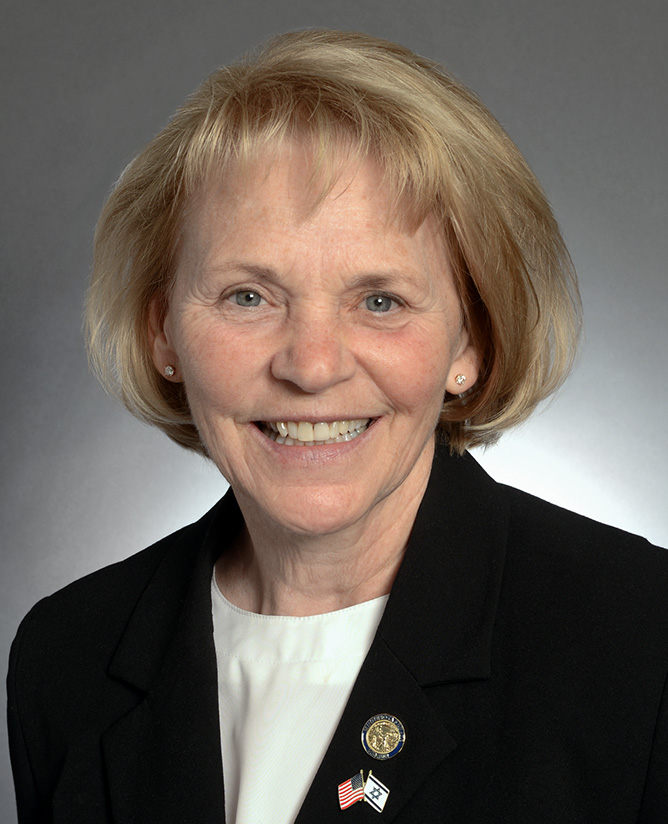
Nominee	Mark Ritchie	Mary Kiffmeyer
Party	Democratic (DFL)	Republican
Popular vote	1,049,432	943,989
Percentage	49.09%	44.16%
- County results Ritchie: 40–50% 50–60% 60–70% Kiffmeyer: 40–50% 50–60%
Secretary of State before election
Mary Kiffmeyer
Republican
Elected Secretary of State
Mark Ritchie
Democratic (DFL)

The 2006 Minnesota Secretary of State election was held on November 7, 2006, in order to elect the Secretary of State of Minnesota. Democratic–Farmer–Labor nominee Mark Ritchie defeated Republican nominee and incumbent Secretary of State Mary Kiffmeyer, For Independent Voters nominee Bruce D. Kennedy and Independence nominee Joel Spoonheim.

== Primary elections ==
On September 12, 2006, Mark Ritchie faced only token opposition in his party's primary from perennial candidate Dick Franson, and easily won his party's nomination. Every other candidate was their respective party's sole nominee, and so won their primaries uncontested that same day.

== General election ==
On election day, November 7, 2006, Democratic–Farmer–Labor nominee Mark Ritchie won the election by a margin of 105,443 votes against his foremost opponent, Republican nominee Mary Kiffmeyer, thereby gaining Democratic–Farmer–Labor control over the office of secretary of state. Ritchie was sworn in as the 21st Minnesota secretary of state on January 2, 2007.

=== Results ===
Minnesota secretary of state election, 2006
Party	Candidate	Votes	%
Democratic (DFL)	Mark Ritchie	1,049,432	49.09
Republican	Mary Kiffmeyer (incumbent)	943,989	44.16
For Independent Voters	Bruce D. Kennedy	78,522	3.67
Independence	Joel Spoonheim	64,489	3.02
Write-in		1,211	0.06
Total votes		2,137,643	100.00
Democratic (DFL) gain from Republican			
