= Baumbach Lake =

Lake in the state of Minnesota, United States

- Location within Minnesota
- Location: Douglas County, Minnesota
- Coordinates: 46°0′32″N 95°35′26″W
- Type: lake

Baumbach Lake is a lake in Douglas County, in the U.S. state of Minnesota.

Baumbach Lake was named for Frederick von Baumbach, an early settler and afterward Minnesota Secretary of State.

== See also ==
- List of lakes in Minnesota
