= David Blakeley =

American newspaper editor and politician (1835 – 1896)

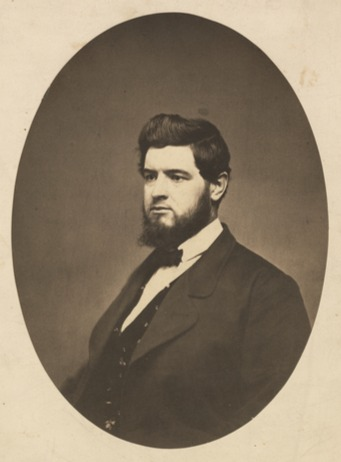
- Blakeley c.1865

3rd Minnesota Secretary of State
- In office November 17, 1862 – January 8, 1866
- Preceded by: James H. Baker
- Succeeded by: Henry C. Rogers

Chief Clerk of the Minnesota House of Representatives
- In office 1861–1862
- Preceded by: Jared Benson
- Succeeded by: Alfred B. Webber

Personal details
- Born: December 7, 1835 Binghamton, New York, U.S.
- Died: November 7, 1896 (aged 60) New York City, New York, U.S.
- Resting place: Upper Plain Cemetery; Bradford, Vermont, U.S.

David Blakeley (December 7, 1835 – November 7, 1896), sometimes spelled as David Blakely, was an American newspaper editor, businessman, and politician who served two terms as the chief clerk of the Minnesota House of Representatives from 1861 to 1862 and two terms as the third Minnesota Secretary of State from 1862 to 1866. Blakeley later served as the band manager of both Patrick Gilmore and John Philip Sousa.

== Early life ==
David Blakeley was born on December 7, 1835, in Binghamton, New York. At a very young age Blakeley's family moved to East Berkshire, Vermont. While in Vermont Blakeley was trained in the printing trade before moving in to Bancroft Township in modern-day Freeborn County (then part of Mower County) in Minnesota Territory in 1856 where he established a newspaper. Not finding success in Bancroft, Blakeley moved to Austin, Minnesota where he established another newspaper, the Mower County Mirror, and was the local Recorder of Deeds. In 1859 Blakeley moved to Rochester, Minnesota where he established the Rochester City Post newspaper.

== Printing career ==
Throughout his life in Minnesota Blakeley and his brothers were each heavily involved in the printing and editing of various newspapers including the Rochester Post, the St. Paul Pioneer Press, and the Minneapolis Tribune. According to the Minnesota Historical Society Blakeley and his two brothers Amherst W. Blakeley and Clarence Blakeley were responsible for the 1875 merging of the St. Paul Pioneer and the St. Paul Press to form the St. Paul Pioneer Press. Later in 1865 when Blakeley lived in Illinois he purchased and improved the Chicago Evening Post. Blakeley later owned and operated the Chicago-based Blakely Printing Company.

== Politics ==
Beginning in 1860 Blakeley ran for the political office of chief clerk of the Minnesota House of Representatives which he won and eventually served as Chief Clerk for the 3rd Minnesota Legislature and the 4th Minnesota Legislature. Blakeley later ran as a Republican in the 1863 Secretary of State Election for the position of Minnesota Secretary of State against Minnesota Democrat Amos Coggswell. Blakeley won 60.73% of the vote with a majority margin of +21.46%. Blakeley was preceded by James H. Baker succeeded by Henry C. Rogers.

== Later life ==
In 1880 Blakeley abandoned the newspaper industry and instead chose to focus on managing the bands of both Patrick Gilmore and John Philip Sousa. A large number of papers and archival materials pertinent to Blakeley's time spent with both Sousa and Gilmore between 1892 and 1896 are held by the New York Public Library. During a tour in New York Blakeley died suddenly at Carnegie Hall on November 7, 1896, after receiving a head injury during a bicycle accident several weeks earlier while in Bradford, Vermont where he was later buried.

== Personal life ==
Blakeley was married to Adeline "Addie" Low of Vermont in 1858, together they had four children.

== In popular culture ==
Blakeley is portrayed by American actor Thomas Browne Henry in the 1952 American biographical film Stars and Stripes Forever.

Political offices
Preceded by James H. Baker	Secretary of State of Minnesota; 1862-1866	Succeeded by Henry C. Rogers
