= Minnesota Secretary of State =

Elected political office in Minnesota, United States

Secretary of State of Minnesota
- Seal of Minnesota

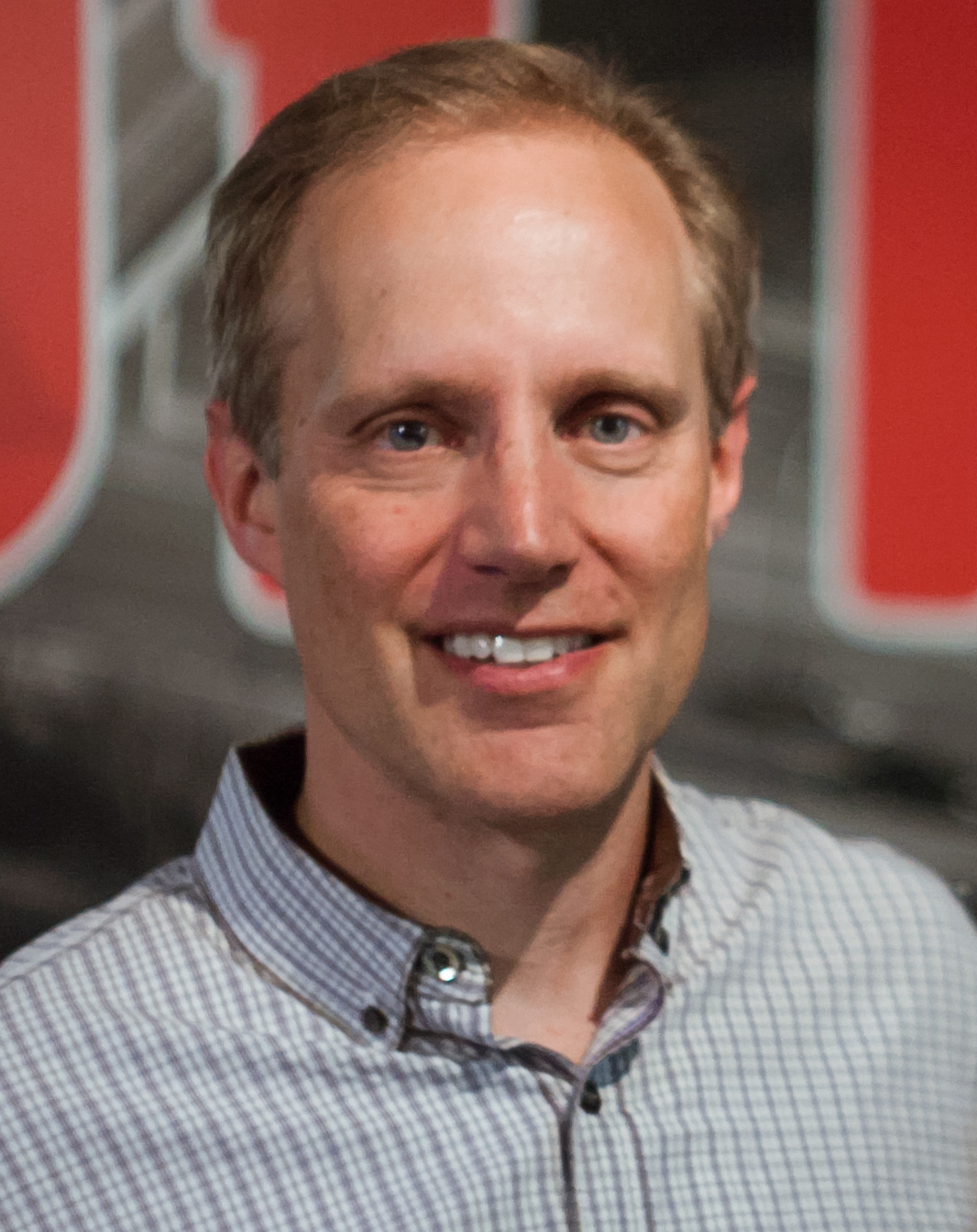
- Incumbent; Steve Simon since January 5, 2015
- Style: Mister or Madam Secretary (informal); The Honorable (formal)
- Member of: Executive Council, among others
- Seat: Minnesota State Capitol; Saint Paul, Minnesota
- Appointer: General election
- Term length: Four years, no term limits
- Constituting instrument: Minnesota Constitution of 1858, Article V
- Inaugural holder: Charles K. Smith
- Formation: May 11, 1858 (168 years ago)
- Succession: Fourth
- Salary: $145,000
- Website: Official page

The secretary of state of Minnesota is a constitutional officer in the executive branch of government of the U.S. state of Minnesota. Twenty-two individuals have held the office of secretary of state since statehood. The incumbent is Steve Simon, a member of the Minnesota Democratic-Farmer-Labor Party.

== Election and term of office ==
The secretary of state is elected by the people on Election Day in November, and takes office on the first Monday of the next January. There is no limit to the number of terms a secretary of state may hold. To be elected secretary of state, a person must be qualified voter, permanently resident in the state of Minnesota at least 30 days prior to the election, and at least 21 years of age.

In the event of a vacancy in the office of the secretary of state, the governor may appoint a successor to serve the balance of the term. The secretary of state may also be recalled by the voters or removed from office through an impeachment trial.

== Powers and duties ==
The secretary of state is keeper of the Great Seal as prescribed by the Minnesota Constitution. As such, the secretary of state files, certifies, and preserves in their office the enrolled laws of the Legislature, executive orders, commissions and proclamations issued by the governor, state agency rules, official oaths and bonds of state officials, and miscellaneous municipal boundary records. In connection with this role, the secretary of state also processes notary public applications and registers a variety of business associations, including corporations, cooperatives, limited liability companies, limited liability partnerships, limited partnerships, assumed business names, and trademarks. Additionally, a statewide computerized network jointly maintained by the Office of the Secretary of State and county recorders allows the public to file and search Uniform Commercial Code and tax lien records throughout the state.

Hand in hand with business registration and the safekeeping of government records, the secretary of state also administers the open appointments process for state agencies and Safe at Home, Minnesota's address confidentiality program for survivors of domestic violence, sexual assault, stalking, and other types of crime. Moreover, the secretary of state annually publishes the Minnesota Legislative Manual, a compendium of federal, state, and local government information. Perhaps the most visible and significant duty of the Secretary of State, however, is the administration of Minnesota's election laws. The secretary of state is Minnesota's chief election officer and as such canvasses and certifies election returns and operates the statewide voter registration system, among other election administration duties.

Aside from these functional responsibilities, the secretary of state chairs the State Canvassing Board and is a member of the Executive Council, the State Board of Investment, and an ex-officio member of the governing board for the Minnesota Historical Society.

== History ==
The office of secretary of state has existed since before the Minnesota Territory achieved statehood in 1858, and the responsibilities of the office have largely remained the same in the intervening years.

=== Territorial secretaries ===
Image	Name	Took office	Left office	Party
	Charles K. Smith	1849	1851	Whig
	Alexander Wilkin	1851	1853	Whig
	Joseph Rosser	1853	1857	Democratic
	Charles L. Chase	1857	1858	Democratic

=== Secretaries of state ===
In 1886, elections were moved from odd years to even years. Beginning with the 1962 election, the term of the office increased from two to four years.

No.	Image	Name	Term	Party	Elected
1		Francis Baasen	1858-1860	Democratic	1857
2		James H. Baker	1860-1862	Republican	1859; 1861
3		David Blakeley	1862-1866	Republican	1863
4		Henry C. Rogers	1866-1870	Republican	1865; 1867
5		Hans Mattson	1870-1872	Republican	1869
6		Samuel P. Jennison	1872-1876	Republican	1871; 1873
7		John S. Irgens	1876-1880	Republican	1875; 1877
8		Frederick Von Baumbach	1880-1887	Republican	1879; 1881; 1883
9		Hans Mattson	1887-1891	Republican	1886; 1888
10		Frederick P. Brown	1891-1895	Republican	1890; 1892
11		Albert Berg	1895-1901	Republican	1894; 1896; 1898
12		Peter E. Hanson	1901-1907	Republican	1900; 1902; 1904
13		Julius A. Schmahl	1907-1921	Republican	1906; 1908; 1910; 1912; 1914; 1916; 1918
14		Mike Holm	1921-1952	Republican	1920; 1922; 1924; 1926; 1928; 1930; 1932; 1934; 1936; 1938; 1940; 1942; 1944; 1946; 1948; 1950
15		H. H. Chesterman	1952	Nonpartisan	
16		Virginia Paul Holm	1952-1955	Republican	1952 (sp.); 1952
17		Joseph L. Donovan	1955-1971	DFL	1954; 1956; 1958; 1960; 1962; 1966
18		Arlen Erdahl	1971-1975	Republican	1970
19		Joan Growe	1975-1999	DFL	1974; 1978; 1982; 1986; 1990; 1994
20		Mary Kiffmeyer	1999-2007	Republican	1998; 2002
21		Mark Ritchie	2007-2015	DFL	2006; 2010
22		Steve Simon	2015-	DFL	2014; 2018; 2022; 2026

- Chesterman served as assistant secretary of state under Mike Holm, and was appointed to the position upon Holm's death. He left office later that same year, and never stood for election.

=== Notes on Minnesota political party names ===
- Minnesota Democratic-Farmer-Labor Party: On April 15, 1944, the Minnesota Democratic Party and the Minnesota Farmer-Labor Party merged and created the Minnesota Democratic-Farmer-Labor Party (DFL). It is affiliated with the national Democratic Party.
- Republican Party of Minnesota: From November 15, 1975, to September 23, 1995, the name of the state Republican party was the Independent-Republican party (I-R). The party has always been affiliated with the national Republican Party.

== See also ==
- List of company registers
