= Frederick von Baumbach =

German-American politician

Frederick Von Baumbach
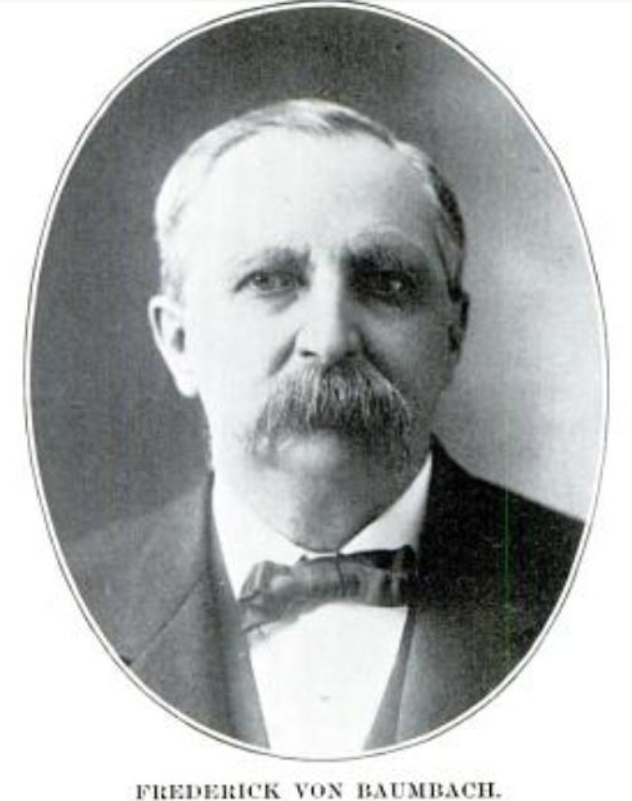

8th Minnesota Secretary of State
- In office 1880–1887
- Preceded by: John S. Irgens
- Succeeded by: Hans Mattson

County Auditor of Douglas County, Minnesota
- In office 1873 - 1880; 1889 - 1898

Personal details
- Born: Friedrich Wilhelm von Baumbach; August 30, 1838 Kirchheim, Hesse, German Confederation
- Died: November 30, 1917 (aged 79) Alexandria, Minnesota
- Resting place: Kinkead Cemetery; Alexandria, Minnesota
- Citizenship: Germany; United States
- Other political affiliations: Republican
- Spouse: Sarah Jane Decker

Military service
- Allegiance: United States of America
- Branch/service: Union Army
- Years of service: 1861-1866
- Rank: Major
- Unit: 5th Wisconsin Infantry Regiment; 35th Wisconsin Infantry Regiment
- Commands: Company C, 5th Wisconsin Infantry Regiment; Company B, 35th Wisconsin Infantry Regiment
- Battles/wars: American Civil War

Friedrich Wilhelm von Baumbach (August 30, 1838 - November 30, 1917), also known as Frederick William Von Baumbach, Fritz Von Baumbach, or Fred Von Baumbach, was a German-American politician, soldier, and businessman. Baumbach served as the county auditor of Douglas County, Minnesota from 1873 to 1880 before being thrice elected to the office of Minnesota Secretary of State and served consecutively from 1880 to 1887. Baumbach was later appointed as the collector of internal revenue for the Internal Revenue Service under the William McKinley administration.

== Early life ==
Frederick William Von Baumbach was born on August 30, 1838, in the city of Kirchheim in the Grand Duchy of Hesse, then part of the German Confederation, to parents Ludwig von Baumbach zu Kirchheim and Wilhelmina "Minnie" Schenk. Baumbach's father Ludwig was a Hessian noble, a veteran of the German campaign of 1813, a member of the Frankfurt National Assembly, and the son of Hessian military officer Wilhelm Lebrecht von Baumbach.

Baumbach's family emigrated to the United States in 1849 during the German revolutions of 1848–1849 and ultimately settled in Ohio. In 1854 Baumbach moved west to the state of Wisconsin, ultimately choosing to settle in Milwaukee which had a large German diaspora. While in Milwaukee Baumbach worked as a deputy and assistant to the Office of the City Treasurer for Milwaukee.

== Military career ==
At the outbreak of the American Civil War Baumbach volunteered for service in the Union Army on June 1, 1861. Baumbach enlisted as a Private and was enrolled into the ranks of Company C of the 5th Wisconsin Infantry Regiment under the command of Captain William F. Behrens. Baumbach rose to the rank of Sergeant Major by December 26, 1861, and was eventually promoted to the rank of Second Lieutenant on July 13, 1862, and First Lieutenant on July 25, 1862. Baumbach eventually resigned his commission on January 18, 1863.

On December 9, 1863, Baumbach re-enlisted into the Union Army under the pseudonym Fritz von Baumbach and was appointed to the rank of Captain and given command of Company B of the 35th Wisconsin Infantry Regiment which was primarily recruited from Milwaukee, Milwaukee County, and eastern Wisconsin. Baumbach would eventually be promoted to the rank of Major of the 35th Wisconsin and served with the unit for the remainder of the war. Baumbach mustered out with the rest of the regiment on March 15, 1866. Following the war Baumbach briefly lived in Fond du Lac, Wisconsin where he owned a pharmaceutical business before moving to Alexandria, Minnesota in 1867.

== Political career ==
Beginning in 1873 Baumbach ran for the local office of county auditor of Douglas County, Minnesota which he won and held for two different terms from 1873 to 1880 and again from 1889 to 1898. Following his first term as auditor of Douglas county Baumbach ran for the political office of Minnesota Secretary of State. Baumbach would be re-elected three consecutives times as Minnesota's Secretary of State from 1890 to 1887. Following his term as Secretary of State Baumbach was appointed as the collector of internal revenue for the Internal Revenue Service under the William McKinley administration. Baumbach would serve in this office until the first administration of Woodrow Wilson. Baumbach died in-office on November 30, 1917, he is buried in Kinkead Cemetery in Alexandria, Minnesota.

== Personal life ==
In 1863 Baumbach married Sarah Jane Decker of Oconomowoc, Wisconsin, they had no children.

== Legacy ==
Baumbach Lake in Douglas County is named after Baumbach, likewise Lake Mina in Douglas County is named after Baumbach's mother, Wilhelmina "Mina" Baumbach (née: Schenk).
