= Peter E. Hanson =

American politician

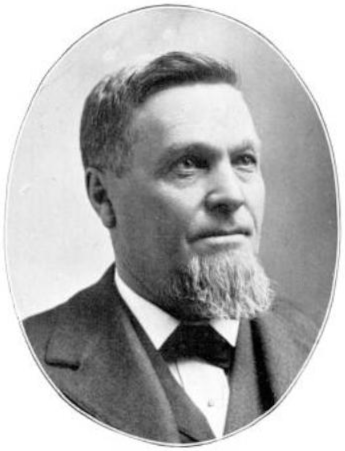

12th Minnesota Secretary of State
- In office 1901–1907

Member of the Minnesota Senate
- In office 1895–1898

Personal details
- Born: June 12, 1845 Branstad, Sweden
- Died: February 11, 1914 (aged 68) Warner Springs, California, U.S.
- Party: Republican
- Occupation: Businessman, politician

Peter E. Hanson (June 12, 1845 – February 11, 1914) was an American politician and businessman who served as the 12th secretary of state of Minnesota from 1901 to 1907 as a member of the Republican Party. He previously served in the Minnesota Senate from 1895 to 1898.

== Biography ==
Hanson was born in Branstad, Sweden on June 12, 1845. He emigrated with his parents to the United States in 1857 and settled in Meeker County, Minnesota. Hanson was involved with the banking business in Litchfield and served as president of the Litchfield County Bank. He also was involved with the real estate business and with farming.

Hanson served on the Meeker County Board of Commissioners and was a Republican. He also served in the Minnesota Senate from 1895 to 1898. Hanson served as the Minnesota Secretary of State from 1901 to 1907.

Hanson died from a stroke while at the Warner's Hot Springs Hotel near San Diego, California on February 11, 1914.

== Notes ==
Party political offices
Preceded by Albert Berg	Republican nominee for Minnesota Secretary of State; 1900, 1902, 1904	Succeeded by Julius A. Schmahl
