= Joseph L. Donovan =

American politician (1893–1985)

- Donovan in 1968

17th Minnesota Secretary of State
- In office January 3, 1955 – January 4, 1971
- Governor: Orville Freeman; Elmer L. Andersen; Karl Rolvaag; Harold LeVander
- Preceded by: Virginia Paul Holm
- Succeeded by: Arlen Erdahl

Personal details
- Born: June 16, 1893 Champion, Michigan, U.S.
- Died: October 28, 1985 (aged 92) Dakota County, Minnesota, U.S.
- Party: Democratic (DFL)
- Spouse: Mary Noldin

Joseph L. Donovan (June 16, 1893 – October 28, 1985) was an American politician, a member of the Democratic-Farmer-Labor Party, and Minnesota's Secretary of State from 1955 to 1971. He also served as a delegate to the Democratic National Convention in 1960 and 1964.

Donovan was born in Champion, Michigan, and later moved to Duluth. He was married to Mary Noldin. He died in Dakota County on October 28, 1985.

Party political offices
| Preceded by Koscie H. Marsh | Democratic nominee for Minnesota Secretary of State; 1954, 1956, 1958, 1960, 1962, 1966 | Succeeded by Daniel D. Donovan |
Political offices
| Preceded by Virginia Paul Holm | Secretary of State of Minnesota; 1955–1971 | Succeeded by Arlen Erdahl |
