= Joan Growe =

American politician

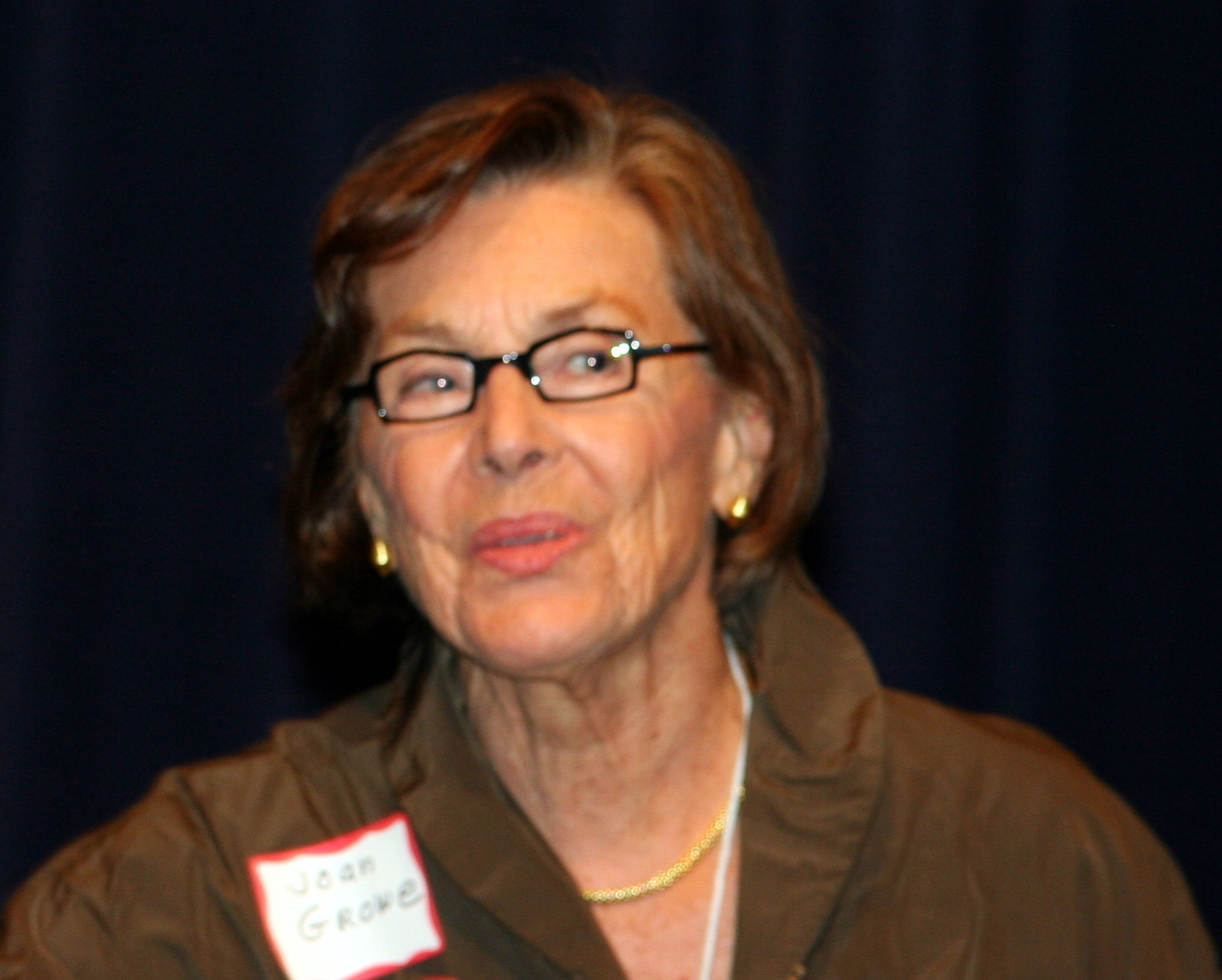
- Growe in 2010

19th Secretary of State of Minnesota
- In office January 6, 1975 – January 4, 1999
- Governor: Wendell Anderson; Rudy Perpich; Al Quie; Rudy Perpich; Arne Carlson
- Preceded by: Arlen Erdahl
- Succeeded by: Mary Kiffmeyer

Personal details
- Born: September 28, 1935 (age 91) Minneapolis, Minnesota, U.S.
- Party: Democratic
- Spouse(s): James Kerr (Divorced); Glen Growe (1965–present)
- Children: 4
- Education: St. Cloud State University (BA); University of Minnesota, Twin Cities (MA)

Joan Ruth Anderson Growe (born September 28, 1935) is an American politician who served as Secretary of State of Minnesota from 1975 to 1999. Known for her work to encourage voter participation, Growe had the second-longest tenure of any secretary of state in Minnesota history, at 24 years. In 1984, she ran for the US Senate against the Republican incumbent, Rudy Boschwitz, losing the election with 41% of the vote.

Growe was raised in Buffalo, Minnesota, and graduated from Buffalo High School and St. Cloud State University. On August 18, 1956, she married James E. Kerr in Buffalo. That marriage ended in divorce. On June 16, 1965, she married Glen Harry Growe.

From 1973 to 1974, Growe was a member of the Minnesota House of Representatives representing the old District 40A, which included parts of Hopkins, Minnetonka, and St. Louis Park in Hennepin County. In the House, she served on the Crime Prevention and Corrections, Education, Judiciary, and Metropolitan and Urban Affairs Committees.

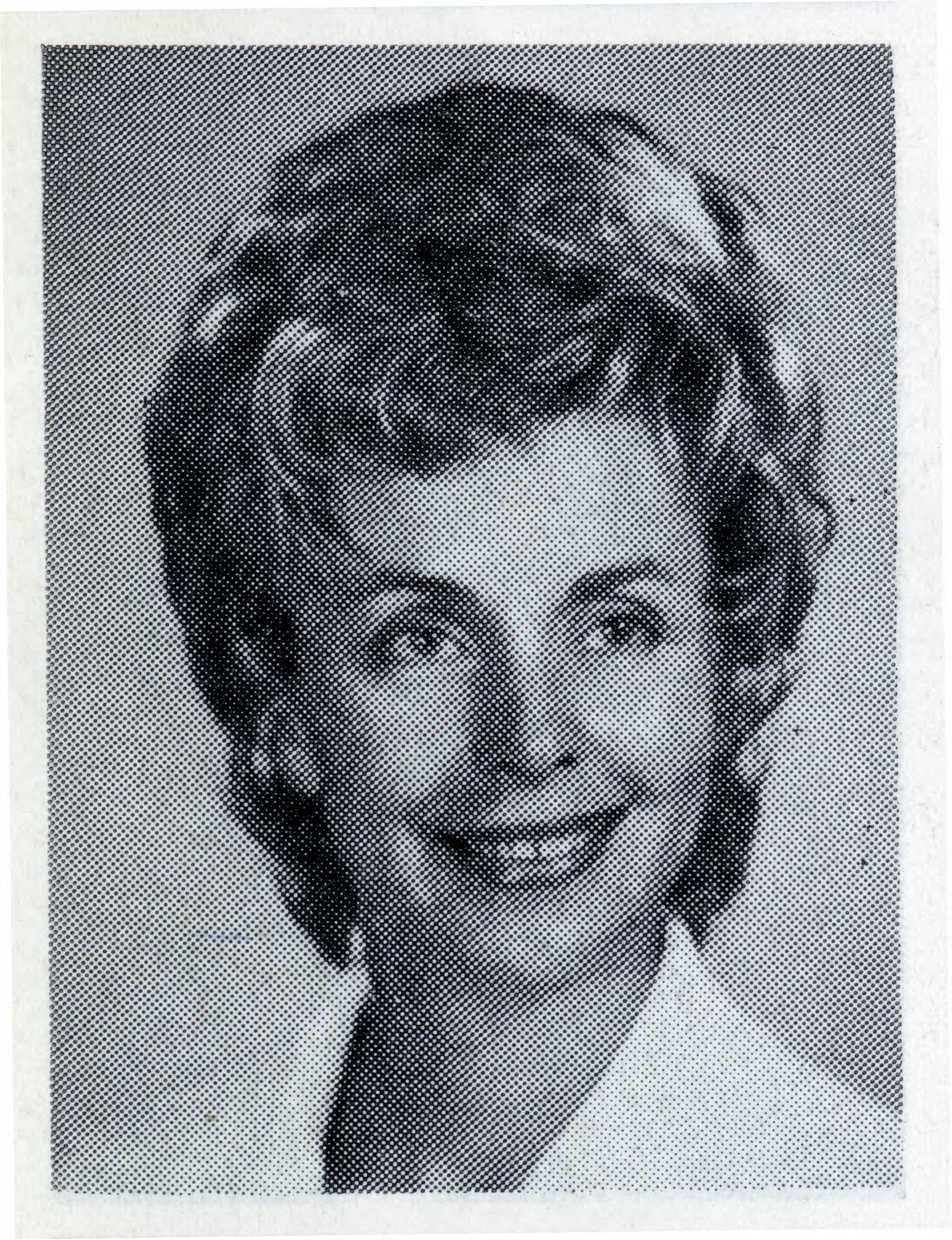
Representative Joan R. Growe, 1973-1974 Legislative Session, Minnesota Legislature

As a state legislator, Growe supported the Minnesota same-day voter registration law (the first in the country) and later, as secretary of state, she worked to implement it. Since then, Minnesota has consistently had the highest voter turnout in the United States.

Growe as Secretary of State in 1977

Growe is widely recognized as an expert on voting and elections and has served as an official election observer in various foreign elections. She is also on the advisory committee for the University of Minnesota's Hubert H. Humphrey Institute of Public Affairs.

The Joan Growe Award for Distinguished Commitment to Expanding Access to Democracy and Justice in Minnesota, named in her honor, has been given annually since 2012.

== Records ==
Files documenting Growe's activities as secretary of state are available for research. They include general and chronological correspondence, telephone logs, appearances, subject files, voter education and elections files, and State Board of Investment files.

Political offices
Preceded by Arlen Erdahl	Secretary of State of Minnesota; 1975–1999	Succeeded by Mary Kiffmeyer
Party political offices
Preceded by Daniel D. Donovan	Democratic nominee for Minnesota Secretary of State; 1974, 1978, 1982, 1986, 1990, 1994	Succeeded by Edwina Garcia
Preceded by Wendell Anderson	Democratic nominee for U.S. Senator from Minnesota ( Class 2); 1984	Succeeded by Paul Wellstone
