= Julius A. Schmahl =

American politician (1867–1955)

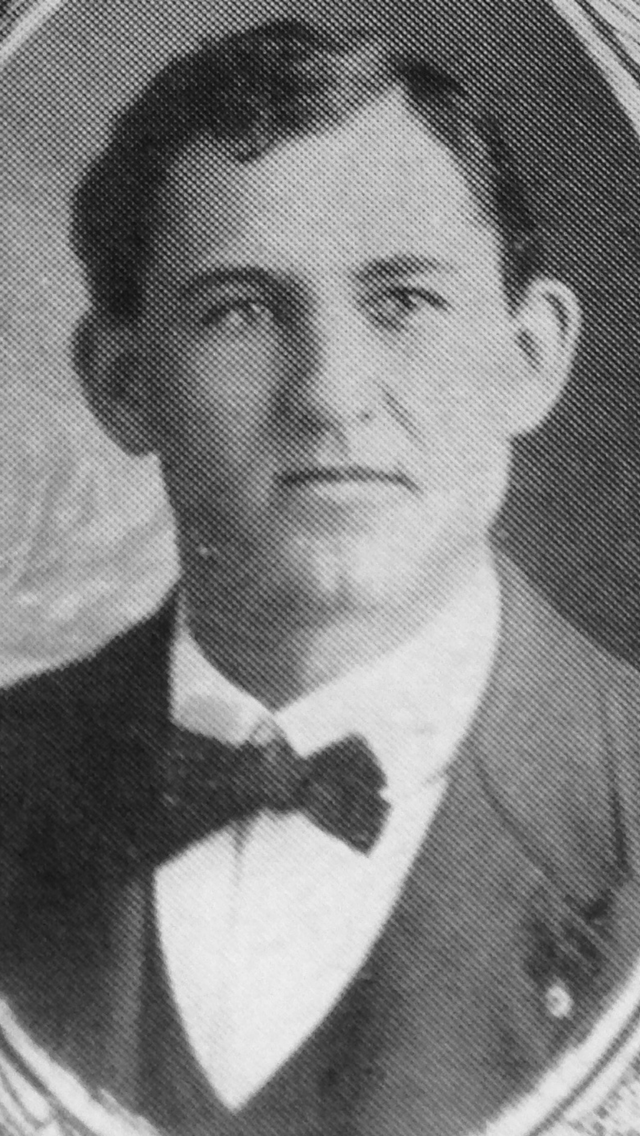

13th Minnesota Secretary of State
- In office January 7, 1907 – January 4, 1921
- Governor: John A. Johnson; Adolph O. Eberhart; Winfield S. Hammond; J. A. A. Burnquist
- Preceded by: Peter E. Hanson
- Succeeded by: Mike Holm

17th Minnesota State Treasurer
- In office January 1927 – January 1937
- Governor: Theodore Christianson; Floyd B. Olson; Hjalmar Petersen
- Preceded by: Edward W. Stark
- Succeeded by: C. A. Halverson

19th Minnesota State Treasurer
- In office January 1939 – January 1951
- Governor: Harold E. Stassen; Edward J. Thye; Luther W. Youngdahl
- Preceded by: C. A. Halverson
- Succeeded by: Kristjan Valdimar Bjornson

Personal details
- Born: August 1, 1867 Traverse des Sioux, Minnesota, U.S.
- Died: April 10, 1955 (aged 87) Saint Paul, Minnesota, U.S.
- Party: Republican
- Spouse: Elizabeth T. Dunnington (m. 1895)
- Relations: Fred Trump (son-in-law)
- Profession: Editor and publisher

Julius August Schmahl (August 1, 1867 – April 10, 1955) was a Minnesota politician, and a member of the Republican Party. He served nearly four decades in statewide elective office, as Minnesota's Secretary of State and Treasurer. He was a newspaper reporter and was the editor of the Redwood Falls Gazette newspaper.

== Biography ==
Julius A. Schmahl was born in Traverse de Sioux, Nicollet County, Minnesota on August 1, 1867.

A newspaper editor and publisher, Schmahl was first elected to statewide office in 1906, winning election as Secretary of State. He would serve twelve years, stepping down in 1921. Schmahl later ran for State Treasurer in 1926. He would hold the position for all but two years between 1927 and 1951.

He married Elizabeth T. Dunnington in February 1895. His daughter Julie was married to Arizona businessman and political candidate Fred Trump.

Schmahl retired from politics in 1951. He died in Saint Paul, Minnesota on April 10, 1955, at the age of 87.

Party political offices
Preceded by Peter E. Hanson	Republican nominee for Minnesota Secretary of State; 1906, 1908, 1910, 1912, 1914, 1916, 1918	Succeeded by Mike Holm
Preceded by Henry Rines	Republican nominee for Minnesota State Treasurer; 1926, 1928, 1930, 1932, 1934, 1936, 1938, 1940, 1942, 1944, 1946, 1948	Succeeded by Val Bjornson
Political offices
Preceded by Peter E. Hanson	Secretary of State of Minnesota; 1907–1921	Succeeded by Mike Holm
Preceded by Edward W. Stark	Minnesota State Treasurer; 1927–1937	Succeeded by C. A. Halverson
Preceded by C. A. Halverson	Minnesota State Treasurer; 1939–1951	Succeeded by Kristjan Valdimar Bjornson
