= Electoral history of Walter Mondale =

Elections featuring US Vice President

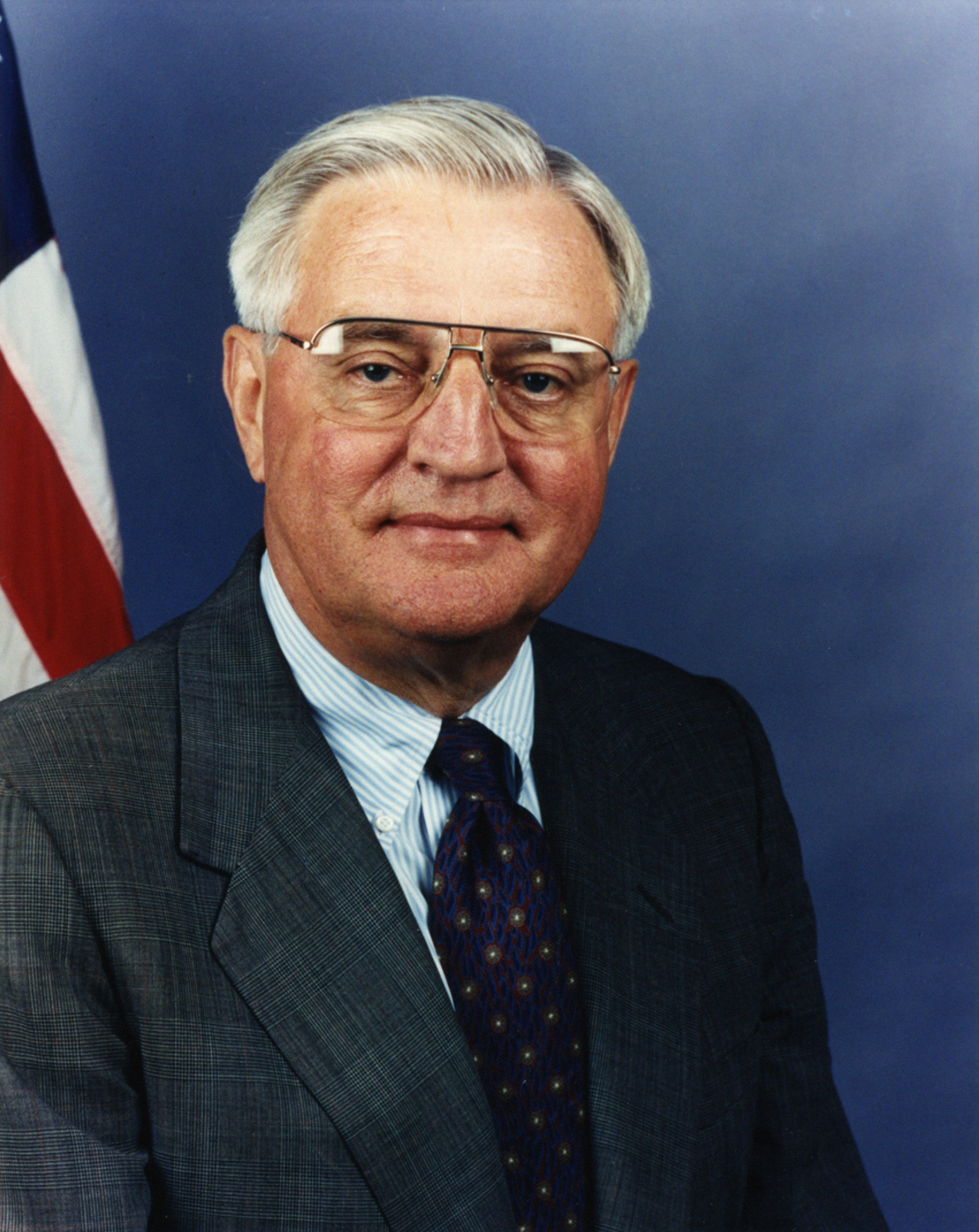

Electoral history of Walter Mondale, who served as the 42nd vice president of the United States (1977–1981); as a United States senator from Minnesota (1964–1976), and as the 23rd attorney general of Minnesota (1960–1964).

== Attorney General of Minnesota ==
=== 1962 ===
Minnesota Attorney General election, 1962:
■ Walter Mondale * (DFL) – 730,783 (59.64%)
■ Robert L. Kunzig (R) – 494,621 (40.36%)

== United States Senate ==
=== 1966 ===
Minnesota U.S. Senate election, 1966 – DFL primary:
■ Walter Mondale * – 410,841 (90.97%)
■ Ralph E. Franklin 40,785 (9.03%)

Minnesota U.S. Senate election, 1966:
■ Walter Mondale * (DFL) – 685,840 (53.94%)
■ Robert A. Forsythe (R) – 574,868 (45.21%)
■ Joseph Johnson (SW) – 5,487 (0.43%)
■ William Braatz (IG) – 5,231 (0.41%)

=== 1972 ===
Minnesota U.S. Senate election, 1972 – DFL primary:
■ Walter Mondale * – 230,679 (89.88%)
■ Tom Griffin – 11,266 (4.39%)
■ Richard Leaf – 7,750 (3.02%)
■ Ralph E. Franklin – 6,946 (2.71%)

Minnesota U.S. Senate election, 1972:
■ Walter Mondale * (DFL) – 981,320 (56.67%)
■ Phil Hansen (R) – 742,121 (42.86%)

=== 2002 ===
Minnesota U.S. Senate election, 2002:
■ Norm Coleman (R) – 1,116,697 (49.53%)
■ Walter Mondale (DFL) – 1,067,246 (47.34%)
■ Jim Moore (IPM) – 45,139 (2.00%)
■ Paul Wellstone *† (DFL) – 11,381 (0.51%)
■ Ray Tricomo (G) – 10,119 (0.45%)
■ Miro Drago Kovatchevich (C) – 2,254 (0.10%)
■ Others – 1,796 (0.08%)

== Presidential and vice presidential ==
=== 1972 ===
Democratic Party presidential nomination, 1972:
■ George McGovern – 1,729 (57.37%)
■ Henry M. Jackson – 525 (17.42%)
■ George Wallace – 382 (12.67%)
■ Shirley Chisholm – 152 (5.04%)
■ Terry Sanford – 78 (2.59%)
■ Hubert Humphrey – 67 (2.22%)
■ Wilbur Mills – 34 (1.13%)
■ Edmund Muskie – 25 (0.83%)
■ Ted Kennedy – 13 (0.43%)
■ Wayne Hays – 5 (0.17%)
■ Eugene McCarthy – 2 (0.07%)
■ Ramsey Clark – 1 (0.03%)
■ Walter Mondale – 1 (0.03%)

=== 1976 ===
Democratic Party vice presidential nomination, 1976:
■ Walter Mondale – 2,817 (94.28%)
■ Carl Albert – 36 (1.21%)
■ Barbara Jordan – 25 (0.84%)
■ Ron Dellums – 20 (0.67%)
■ Henry M. Jackson – 16 (0.54%)
■ Gary Benoit – 12 (0.40%)
■ Frank Church – 11 (0.37%)
■ Fritz Efaw – 11 (0.37%)
■ Peter Flaherty – 11 (0.37%)
■ George Wallace – 6 (0.20%)
■ Allard Lowenstein – 5 (0.17%)
■ Edmund Muskie – 4 (0.13%)
■ Philip Hart – 2 (0.07%)
■ Thomas E. Morgan – 2 (0.07%)
■ Mo Udall – 2 (0.07%)
■ Wendell Anderson – 1 (0.03%)
■ Al Castro – 1 (0.03%)
■ Fred R. Harris – 1 (0.03%)
■ Ernest Hollings – 1 (0.03%)
■ Peter Rodino – 1 (0.03%)
■ Daniel Schorr – 1 (0.03%)
■ Josephnie Smith – 1 (0.03%)
■ Hunter S. Thompson – 1 (0.03%)

1976 United States presidential election
■ Jimmy Carter and Walter Mondale (D)
Popular vote: 40,831,881 (50.08%) Electoral votes: 297 (55.2%)
■ Gerald Ford * and Bob Dole (R)
Popular vote: 39,148,634 (48.01%) Electoral votes: 240 (Note: One faithless elector in the state of Washington cast his electoral vote for Ronald Reagan (president) and Robert Dole (vice president).)
■ Eugene McCarthy and (Note: The running mate of Eugene McCarthy varied from state to state.) (I)
Popular vote:744,763 (0.91%) Electoral votes: 0
■ Roger MacBride and David Bergland (L)
Popular vote:172,557 (0.21%) Electoral vote: 0
■ Lester Maddox and William Dyke (AI)
Popular vote: 170,373 (0.21%) Electoral vote: 0
■ Thomas J. Anderson and Rufus Shackelford (A)
Popular vote: 158,724 (0.19%) Electoral votes: 0
■ Others
Popular vote: 313,848 (0.39%) Electoral votes: 0

=== 1980 ===
Democratic Party presidential nomination, 1980:
■ Jimmy Carter * – 2,123 (64.04%)
■ Ted Kennedy – 1,151 (34.72%)
■ William Proxmire – 10 (0.30%)
■ Koryne Kaneski Horbal – 5 (0.15%)
■ Scott M. Matheson – 5 (0.15%)
■ Ron Dellums – 3 (0.09%)
■ Robert Byrd – 2 (0.06%)
■ John Culver – 2 (0.06%)
■ Kent Hance – 2 (0.06%)
■ Jennings Randolph – 2 (0.06%)
■ Warren Spannaus – 2 (0.06%)
■ Alice Tripp – 2 (0.06%)
■ Jerry Brown – 1 (0.03%)
■ Dale Bumpers – 1 (0.03%)
■ Hugh L. Carey – 1 (0.03%)
■ Walter Mondale – 1 (0.03%)
■ Edmund Muskie – 1 (0.03%)
■ Thomas J. Steed – 1 (0.03%)

Democratic Party vice presidential nomination, 1980:
■ Walter Mondale * – 2,429 (72.99%)
■ Abstentions – 724 (21.76%)
■ Melvin Boozer – 49 (1.44%)
■ Ed Rendell – 28 (0.84%)
■ Roberto A. Mondragon – 19 (0.57%)
■ Patricia Stone Simon – 11 (0.33%)
■ Tom Daschle – 10 (0.30%)
■ Ted Kulongoski – 8 (0.24%)
■ Shirley Chisholm – 6 (0.18%)
■ Terry Chisholm – 6 (0.18%)
■ Barbara Jordan – 4 (0.12%)
■ Richard M. Nolan – 4 (0.12%)
■ Patrick Joseph Lucey – 3 (0.09%)
■ Jerry Brown – 2 (0.06%)
■ George McGovern – 2 (0.06%)
■ Eric Tovar – 2 (0.06%)
■ Mo Udall – 2 (0.06%)
■ Les Aspin – 1 (0.03%)
■ Mario Biaggi – 1 (0.03%)
■ George S. Broody – 1 (0.03%)
■ Michella Kathleen Gray – 1 (0.03%)
■ Michael J. Carrington – 1 (0.03%)
■ Frank Johnson – 1 (0.03%)
■ Eunice Kennedy Shriver – 1 (0.03%)
■ Dennis Krumm – 1 (0.03%)
■ Mary Ann Kuharski – 1 (0.03%)
■ Jim McDermott – 1 (0.03%)
■ Barbara Mikulski – 1 (0.03%)
■ Gaylord Nelson – 1 (0.03%)
■ George Orwell – 1 (0.03%)
■ Charles Prine – 1 (0.03%)
■ William A. Redmond – 1 (0.03%)
■ Jim Thomas – 1 (0.03%)
■ Elly Uharis – 1 (0.03%)
■ Jim Weaver – 1 (0.03%)
■ William Winpisinger – 1 (0.03%)

1980 United States presidential election:
■ Ronald Reagan and George H. W. Bush (R)
Popular vote: 43,903,230 (50.75%) Electoral votes: 489 (90.9%)
■ Jimmy Carter * and Walter Mondale * (D)
Popular vote: 35,480,115 (41.01%) Electoral votes: 49 (9.1%)
■ John B. Anderson and Patrick Joseph Lucey (I)
Popular vote: 5,719,850 (6.61%) Electoral votes: 0
■ Ed Clark and David H. Koch (L)
Popular vote: 921,128 (1.06%) Electoral votes: 0
■ Barry Commoner and LaDonna Harris (C)
Popular vote: 233,052 (0.27%) Electoral votes: 0
■ Others
Popular vote: 252,303 (0.29%) Electoral votes: 0

=== 1984 ===
1984 Democratic Party presidential primaries:
■ Walter Mondale – 6,952,912 (38.32%)
■ Gary Hart – 6,504,842 (35.85%)
■ Jesse Jackson – 3,282,431 (18.09%)
■ John Glenn – 617,909 (3.41%)
■ George McGovern – 334,801 (1.85%)
■ Unpledged delegates – 146,212 (0.81%)
■ Lyndon LaRouche – 123,649 (0.68%)
■ Reubin Askew – 52,759 (0.29%)
■ Alan Cranston – 51,437 (0.28%)
■ Ernest Hollings – 33,684 (0.19%)

Democratic Party presidential nomination, 1984:
■ Walter Mondale – 2,191 (56.41%)
■ Gary Hart – 1,201 (30.92%)
■ Jesse Jackson – 466 (12.00%)
■ Thomas Eagleton – 18 (0.46%)
■ George McGovern – 4 (0.10%)
■ John Glenn – 2 (0.05%)
■ Joe Biden – 1 (0.03%)
■ Martha Kirkland – 1 (0.03%)

1984 United States presidential election:
■ Ronald Reagan * and George H. W. Bush * (R)
Popular vote: 54,455,472 (58.77%) Electoral votes: 525 (97.58%)
■ Walter Mondale and Geraldine Ferraro (D)
Popular vote: 37,577,352 (40.56%) Electoral votes: 13 (2.42%)
■ David Bergland and James A. Lewis (L)
Popular vote: 228,111 (0.25%) Electoral vote: 0
■ Others
Popular vote:392,298 (0.42%) Electoral votes: 0
