= Comptroller of the United States Army =

US Army senior position

The Comptroller of the United States Army was a US Army senior management position. The incumbent had general staff responsibility for:

- the independent review and analysis of Army programs, and analysis of major Army commands;
- finance and accounting, fiscal, audit, budgetary, progress and statistical reporting, reports control, cost analysis, and management analysis activities of the Army;
- legislative policies and programs pertaining to appropriation acts;
- management systems of the Army;
- overall management improvement; and
- analysis of Army organization, functions, and procedures.

The Comptroller of the Army was under the direction and supervision of the Assistant Secretary of the Army (Financial Management) with concurrent responsibility to the Chief of Staff. The position was equivalent to a Deputy Chief of Staff. The Comptroller of the Army exercised general staff supervision over the Chief, United States Army Audit Agency.

The last person to hold the position of Comptroller was Lt. Gen. Merle Freitag until his retirement in 1994. After his retirement, the office was abolished and the position was combined with the Assistant Secretary of the Army (Financial Management). The position was later renamed the Assistant Secretary of the Army (Financial Management and Comptroller).

== List of comptrollers and acting comptrollers of the United States Army ==
This is an incomplete list. Please help to complete it.

Holder	Start of term	Term end
Maj. Gen. George J. Richards	January 2, 1948	July 15, 1948
Maj. Gen. Edmond H. Leavey	July 16, 1948	June 30, 1949
Lt. Gen. Raymond S. McLain	August 1, 1949	April 30, 1952
Maj. Gen. William H. Arnold (acting)	April 1950	August 1950
Maj. Gen. George H. Decker	May 1, 1950	January 6, 1955
Lt. Gen. Laurin L. Williams	1955	1957
Maj. Gen. William S. Lawton	July 1, 1957	May 31, 1960
Lt. Gen. David W. Traub	1960	1962
Lt. Gen. Charles B. Duff	1962	1963
Lt. Gen. Robert Hackett	1963	1966
Lt. Gen. Frank J. Sackton	1966	1970
Lt. Gen. John M. Wright	1970	1972
TBC	1972	1973
Lt. Gen. Edward M. Flanagan Jr.	1973	1974
Lt. Gen. John A. Kjellstrom	1974	1977
Lt. Gen. Richard L. West	1977	1981
Lt. Gen. Ernest D. Peixotto	1981	1984
Lt. Gen. Max W. Noah	1984	1988
Lt. Gen. James F. McCall	1988	1991
Lt. Gen. Merle Freitag	1991	1994
