= AFAB =

AFAB may refer to:

- Associação de Futebol Americano do Brasil, governs American football in Brazil
- Authority of the Freeport Area of Bataan, operates and manages the Freeport Area of Bataan, Mariveles, Bataan, Philippines
- Assigned female at birth, in relation to an individual's sex assignment

== See also ==
- 674th Airborne Field Artillery Battalion, former part of the US Army
