= Walter T. Kerwin Jr. =

United States Army general (1917–2008)

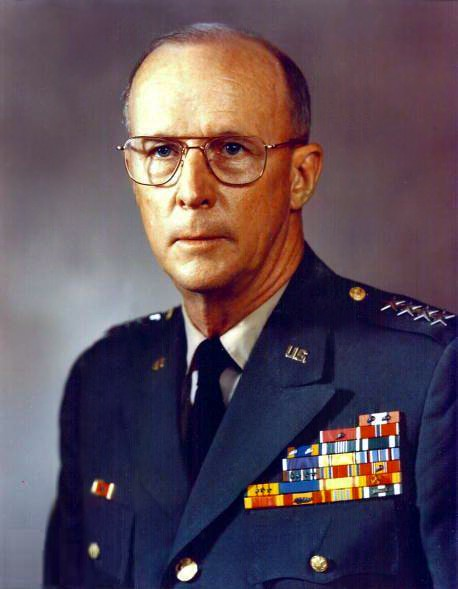
- Born: 14 June 1917; West Chester, Pennsylvania, US
- Died: 11 July 2008 (aged 91); Alexandria, Virginia, US
- Military career
- Allegiance: United States
- Branch: United States Army
- Service years: 1939–1978
- Rank: General
- Nickname: "Dutch"
- Commands: Vice Chief of Staff of the United States Army; United States Army Forces Command; United States Continental Army Command; II Field Force, Vietnam; 3rd Armored Division Artillery
- Conflicts: World War II; Vietnam War
- Awards: Defense Distinguished Service Medal; Army Distinguished Service Medal (3); Legion of Merit (2); Bronze Star Medal; Air Medal (11); Purple Heart

Walter Thomas Kerwin Jr. (14 June 1917 – 11 July 2008) was a United States Army four star general who served as Commanding General, United States Continental Army Command in 1973, Commanding General, United States Army Forces Command from 1973 to 1974, and Vice Chief of Staff of the United States Army from 1974 to 1978. He was the first commander of United States Army Forces Command and a member of the Association of the United States Army's advisory board of Directors since 1984.

== Military career ==
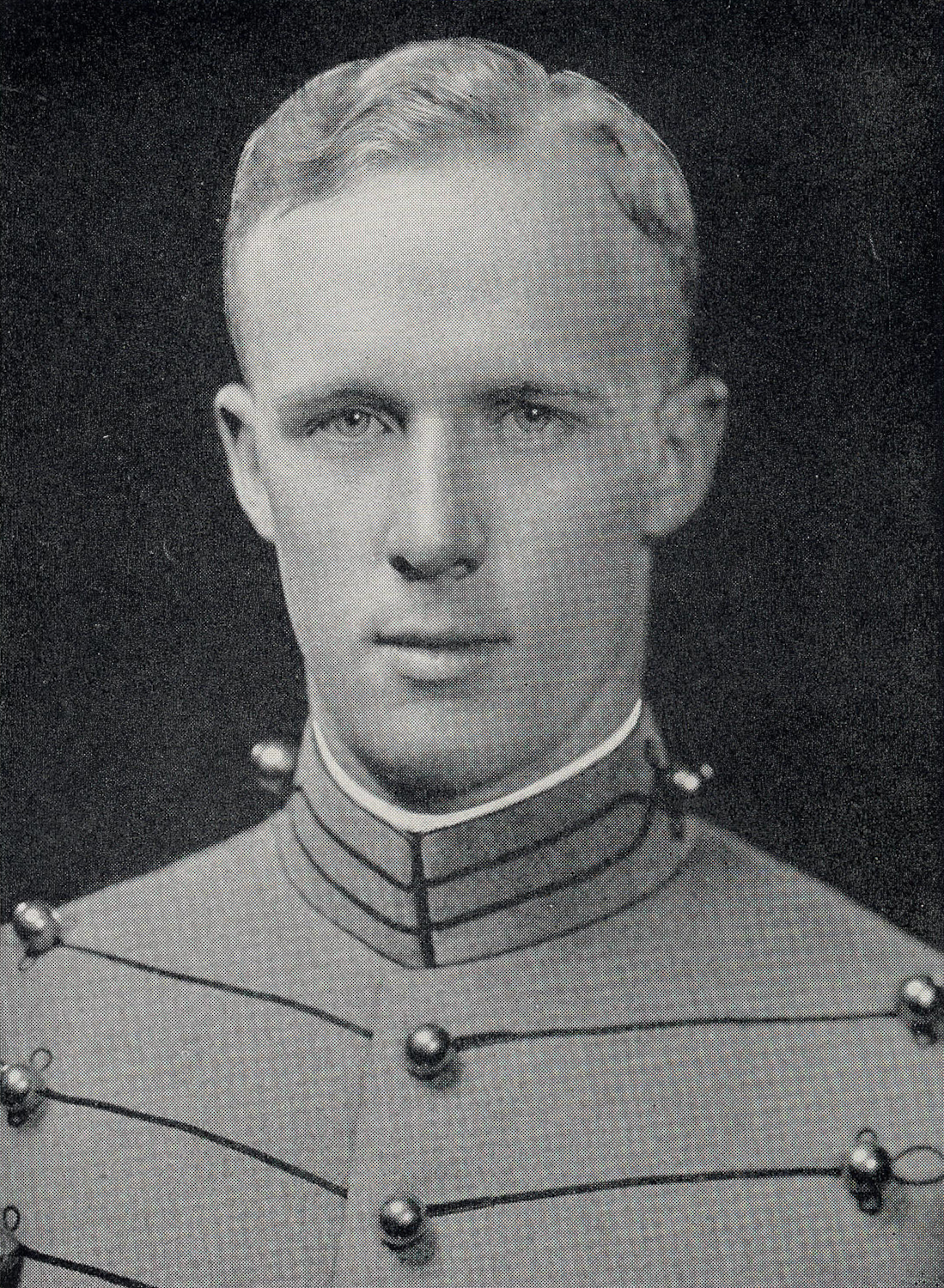
Kerwin as a West Point cadet in 1939

Kerwin graduated from the United States Military Academy in 1939 and was commissioned in the field artillery and assigned to the 3rd Infantry Division. During World War II he fought in North Africa, Sicily, Italy and France. In December 1944, while in France, he was wounded in Mutzig and evacuated to the United States, returning to Europe in 1945 and assigned to the Theater Operations Division of the War Department's General Staff.

As a brigadier general Kerwin took command of the 3rd Armored Division Artillery in Hanau, Germany in August 1961. During the 1960s he held various flag officer billets to include Chief of Staff, Military Assistance Command, Vietnam (MACV), Commander, II Field Force, Vietnam, Deputy Chief of Staff of the Army for Personnel, and Commanding General of the Continental Army Command, later split into two, Forces Command and Training and Doctrine Command.

Kerwin is heralded as the champion of the "One Army" or "Total Army" concept. This concept, which became a reality under his leadership, recognized the indispensable role of the Army National Guard and United States Army Reserve as equal partners with the active Army in executing defense policy and in preparing for war.

Recognized by his commanders and peers as an innovative artilleryman, Kerwin developed a system of massing fires that contributed immeasurably to the success of the Allied landings at Anzio Beachhead. After World War II, he attended the Army War College and the National War College, and served in various assignments, including Plans and Operations Officer at the Los Alamos Scientific Laboratory; Commander of the 56th Artillery Group, XVIII Airborne Corps; and deputy director in the Army's Office of the Chief of Research and Development.

On 29 October 1974 Kerwin became Vice Chief of Staff of the United States Army during the army's transition to an all-volunteer force and post-Vietnam War restructuring.

== Awards and decorations ==
Kerwin awards and decorations include the Defense Distinguished Service Medal, Army Distinguished Service Medal with two oak leaf clusters, Legion of Merit with oak leaf cluster, the Bronze Star, Air Medal with ten oak leaf clusters, the Army Commendation Medal, the Navy Commendation Medal and the Purple Heart. Kerwin's service awards include the American Defense Service Medal, European Campaign Medal, World War II Victory Medal, National Defense Service Medal with star, Vietnam Service Medal and Republic of Vietnam Campaign Medal.

== Post military ==
After retiring from the army, Kerwin continued to work for the Department of Defense in different capacities. He also served for 17 years as a consultant for Martin Marietta and Lockheed Martin. Having been a member of the board of directors of the Army and Air Force Mutual Aid Association since 1969, he became its chairman in 1982, serving in that capacity until 1997. He has also been involved with the Association of the United States Army, the Field Artillery Association, and the Army Emergency Relief Association. He received the 2003 Distinguished Graduate Award from the Association of Graduates, the West Point alumni organization.

== Death ==
On 11 July 2008 in Alexandria, Virginia of respiratory failure. He was preceded in death by his first wife, Barbara in 1980. Kerwin was survived by his second wife Marion Kerwin, his son, Lieutenant Colonel Bruce Kerwin his daughter Anne Walker Kerwin, 3 granddaughters and 5 great-grandchildren.

Military offices
Preceded by Frederick C. Weyand	Vice Chief of Staff of the United States Army; 1974–1978	Succeeded by Frederick Kroesen
