= Edward M. Flanagan Jr. =

US Army lieutenant general (1921–2019)

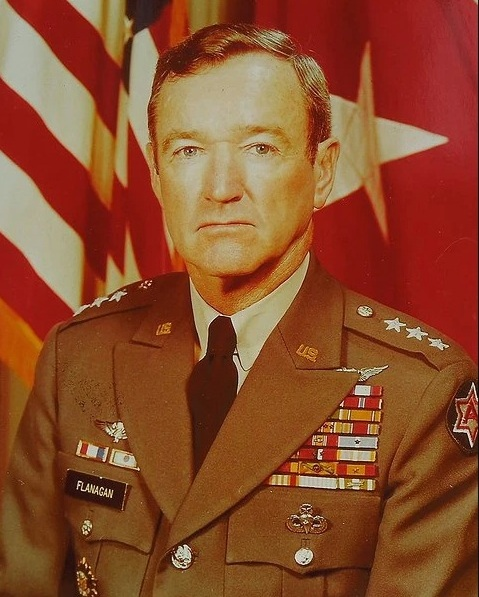
- Flanagan as commander of Sixth Army in 1976
- Born: 13 July 1921; Saugerties, New York, US
- Died: 7 November 2019 (aged 98); Lady's Island, South Carolina, US
- Burial place: West Point Cemetery
- Education: United States Military Academy; United States Army Command and General Staff College; Air Command and Staff College; Armed Forces Staff College; United States Army War College; Boston University
- Spouse: Marguerite Farrell (m. 1945–2019)
- Children: 5
- Military career
- Service: United States Army
- Service years: 1943–1978
- Rank: Lieutenant General
- Nickname: Fly
- Service number: O-25710
- Unit: U.S. Army Field Artillery Branch
- Commands: Battery B, 457th Airborne Field Artillery Battalion; 674th Airborne Field Artillery Battalion; 3rd Armored Division Artillery; Training Directorate, Military Assistance Command, Vietnam; John F. Kennedy Special Warfare Center and School; 1st Infantry Division; Comptroller of the United States Army; Sixth Army
- Wars: World War II; Korean War; Vietnam War
- Awards: Army Distinguished Service Medal (2); Legion of Merit (2); Bronze Star Medal
- Other work: Law firm manager Author

Edward M. Flanagan Jr. (13 July 1921 – 7 November 2019) was a career officer in the United States Army. A veteran of World War II, the Korean War, and the Vietnam War, he served from 1943 to 1978 and attained the rank of lieutenant general. Flanagan's command assignments included the John F. Kennedy Special Warfare Center and School, 1st Infantry Division, and Sixth Army, and his awards included two awards of the Army Distinguished Service Medal, two awards of the Legion of Merit, and the Bronze Star Medal.

A native of the village of Saugerties, New York, Flanagan graduated with the United States Military Academy's wartime class of January 1943 and became qualified in the Field Artillery Branch and graduated from the United States Army Airborne School, then served during World War II's Philippines campaign of 1944 and 1945, including combat on Luzon. He later took part in the Battle of Okinawa and Occupation of Japan.

As Flanagan advanced through the ranks, his commands included the 674th Airborne Field Artillery Battalion during the Korean War and member of the faculty of the Naval War College. He commanded the 3rd Armored Division Artillery in West Germany from 1962 to 1966, and during 1966 and 1967 he was assistant division commander of the 25th Infantry Division during its Vietnam War service. In the 1970s, he commanded the John F. Kennedy Special Warfare Center and School and 1st Infantry Division. After promotion to lieutenant general, he served as Comptroller of the United States Army from 1973 to 1974 and commanded Sixth Army from 1975 until retiring in 1978.

After retiring, Flanagan settled in South Carolina, where he managed a Beaufort and Hilton Head law firm for six years. He then pursued a writing career, during which he authored 11 books on military history and more than more than 100 articles on military topics. He died at Lady's Island, South Carolina on 7 November 2019 and was buried at West Point Cemetery.

== Early life ==
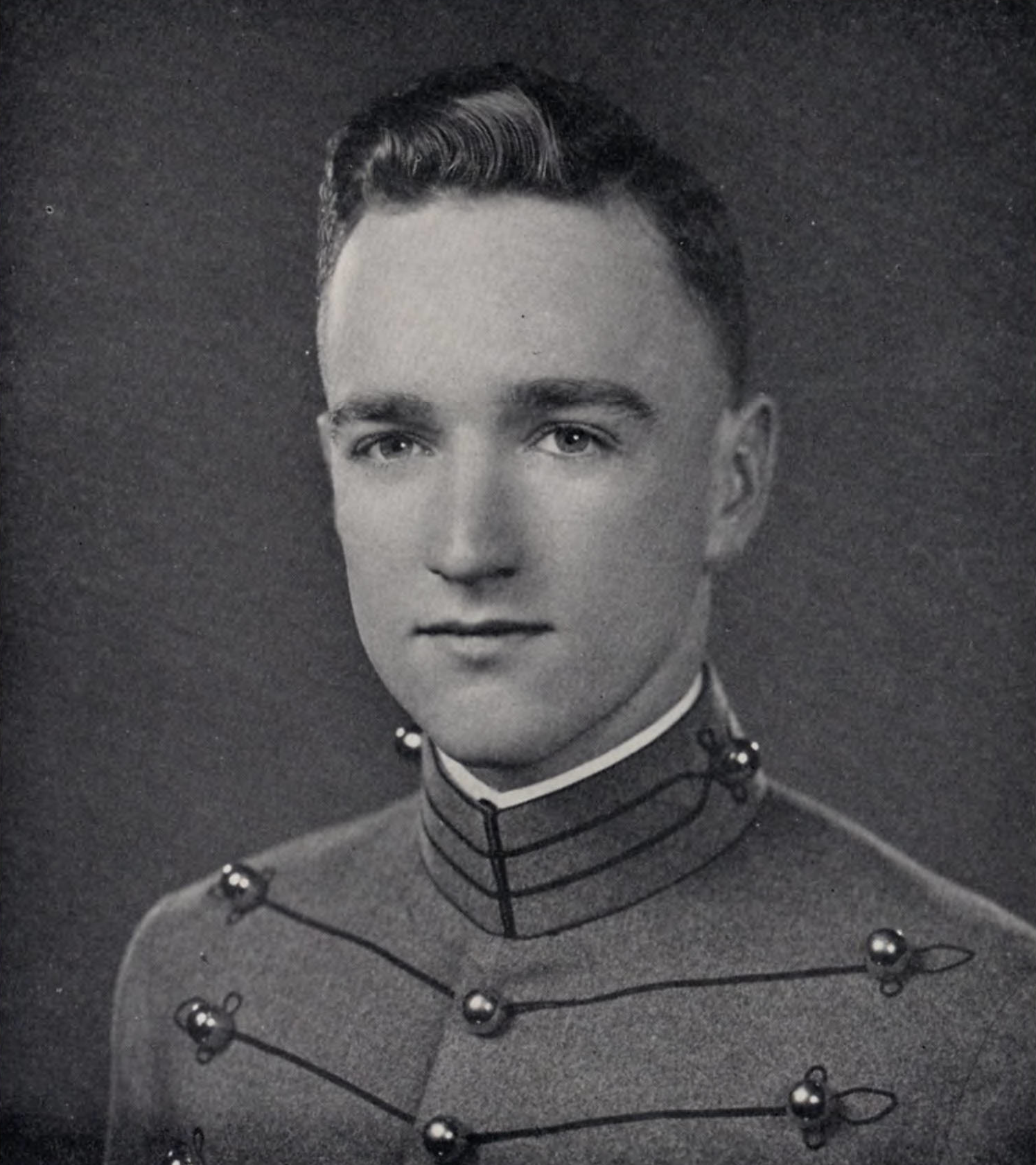
Flanagan as a United States Military Academy cadet c. 1943

Edward Michael Flanagan Jr., nicknamed "Fly", was born in the village of Saugerties, New York on 13 July 1921, the son of Edward Michael Flanagan Sr. and Marie (Sinnott) Flanagan. He was raised and educated in Saugerties, and was a 1937 graduate of Saugerties High School. He then attended Staunton Military Academy in preparation for attendance at the United States Military Academy (West Point). In January 1939, Flanagan was one of two applicants who successfully completed the competitive examination for appointments to West Point that were offered by US Representative Lewis K. Rockefeller. (Note: The second was Thomas W. Flatley (1922–2004), who retired as a colonel in 1973.)

Flanagan attended West Point from July 1939 to January 1943, when his class completed requirements early because of the need for trained officers during World War II. Flanagan graduated ranked 283rd of 409, and received his commission as a second lieutenant of Field Artillery. After graduating, he completed the Artillery Officer Basic Course at Fort Sill, Oklahoma and the United States Army Airborne School. He was promoted to first lieutenant in May 1943.

== Start of career ==
After receiving his Parachutist Badge, Flanagan was assigned as executive officer of Battery B, 457th Airborne Field Artillery Battalion. He took part in the New Guinea campaign, and subsequently served as the battalion's assistant operations officer (assistant S-3), and commander of Battery B. Flanagan was promoted to captain in September 1944. As assistant chief of staff for operations (G-3) of the 11th Airborne Division, he took part in the Battle of Okinawa and he was promoted to major in April 1945.

After the war, Flanagan attended the United States Army Command and General Staff College, then joined the 11th Airborne as its assistant chief of staff for personnel (G-1) during the Occupation of Japan. He subsequently served as the division historian, then as executive officer of the 319th Airborne Field Artillery Battalion. Upon return to the United States, he joined he 82nd Airborne Division as adjutant of the division artillery, then served as the division's assistant G-3. In 1948, he published his first book, The Angels: A History of the 11th Airborne Division 1943-1946. Flanagan graduated from the Air Command and Staff College in 1949, then was assigned as assistant chief of staff for Intelligence (G-2) for the 82nd Airborne Division. In 1950, he was assigned as an instructor at the Artillery School's division of Airborne and Special Operations.

== Continued career ==
During the Korean War, Flanagan commanded the 674th Airborne Field Artillery Battalion, a unit of the 187th Airborne Regimental Combat Team. In 1952, he was appointed the Assistant Secretary of the United States Army Field Artillery School at Fort Sill. After the war, he attended the Armed Forces Staff College, then served as assistant secretary of the general staff for the Chief of Staff of the United States Army. He then completed the course at the United States Army War College in 1959, which was followed by three years teaching at the Naval War College. While at the Naval War College, he completed a Master of Science degree in political science at Boston University. From 1962 to 1966, Flanagan commanded the 3rd Armored Division Artillery in West Germany and served as secretary of the general staff for United States Army Europe. In October 1966, he received promotion to brigadier general.

Flanagan served in South Vietnam during the Vietnam War (January 1967 to August 1968), including postings as assistant division commander of the 25th Infantry Division, Director of Military Assistance Command, Vietnam's Training Directorate, and deputy chief of staff for operations of III Marine Expeditionary Force. He returned to Fort Bragg, North Carolina in 1968 to command the John F. Kennedy Special Warfare Center and School and was promoted to major general in 1970. From January 1971 to December 1972, Flanagan was commander of the 1st Infantry Division. In 1972, he was promoted to lieutenant general and appointed as Comptroller of the United States Army. In 1974, he was assigned as deputy commander of Eighth U.S. Army. In 1975, Flanagan became commander of Sixth Army at the Presidio of San Francisco. He retired from the army on 30 June 1978.

== Later career ==
After his military retirement, Flanagan settled in South Carolina, and worked for six years as manager of alaw firm in Beaufort and Hilton Head. In addition, he authored over 100 journal articles on military topics, including 45 for ARMY Magazine's "Before the Battle" series. He was also the author of 11 books, the last of which, Airborne, was published in 2003.

Flanagan died at Lady's Island, South Carolina on 7 November 2019. He was buried at West Point Cemetery.

== Awards ==
Flanagan was both a master parachutist and an Army aviator, and was a veteran of 98 parachute jumps. His awards included:

- Army Distinguished Service Medal with oak leaf cluster
- Legion of Merit with oak leaf cluster
- Bronze Star Medal
- Air Medal with oak leaf cluster
- Army Commendation Medal
- Asiatic–Pacific Campaign Medal with arrowhead device and 3 battle stars
- Vietnam Service Medal with 5 campaign stars
- Order of National Security Merit (South Korea)
- National Order of Vietnam (Knight) (South Vietnam)
- Distinguished Service Order (1st Class) (South Vietnam)
- Gallantry Cross with gold star (South Vietnam)
- Armed Forces Honor Medal (South Vietnam)
- Master Parachutist Badge
- Army Aviator Badge

== Works by ==
A partial list of Flanagan's written work includes:

=== Books ===
- The Angels: a History of the 11th Airborne Division 1943-1946. Washington DC: Infantry Journal Press. 1948.
- Before the Battle: A Commonsense Guide to Leadership and Management. Presidio Press. 1985. ISBN 0-89141-210-7.
- The Los Banos Raid. Presidio Press, 1986.
- Corregidor, The Rock Force Assault. Presidio Press. 1988.
- The Angels. Presidio Press. 1989.
- The Battle for Panama, Inside Operation Just Cause. Brasseys. 1993.
- The 11th Airborne Division. Turner Publishers. 1994.
- Lightning, The 101st in Desert Storm. Brasseys. 1994.
- The Rakkasans. Presidio Press. 1997.
- Airborne: A Combat History of American Airborne Forces. Ballantine Books. 2002.

=== Articles ===
- "Hollywood Can't Make Soldiers". Army Forces Combat Journal. The Des Moines Register. 26 December 1955. p. 8 – via Newspapers.com.
