= Reidar Waaler =

United States Army soldier

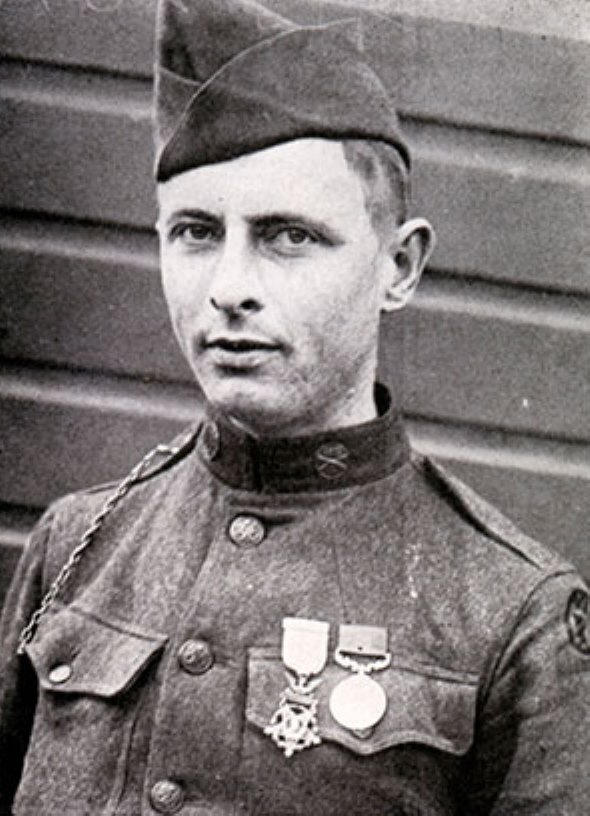
- Medal of Honor recipient
- Born: February 12, 1894; Oslo, Norway
- Died: February 5, 1979 (aged 84); West Palm Beach, Florida, U.S.
- Burial place: Forest Hills Memorial Park and Mausoleum Palm City, Florida
- Military career
- Allegiance: United States of America
- Branch: United States Army
- Service years: 1917 - 1919
- Rank: Sergeant
- Service number: 1209189
- Units: Company A, 105th Machine Gun Battalion, 27th Division
- Conflicts: World War I
- Awards: Medal of Honor

Reidar Waaler (February 12, 1894 – February 5, 1979) was a soldier in the United States Army who received the Medal of Honor for his actions during World War I.

== Biography ==
Waaler was born in Norway on February 12, 1894, and died February 5, 1979. He is buried in Forest Hills Memorial Park and Mausoleum Palm City, Florida. His grave can be found in the NEAGS section, row A, lot 5.

== Medal of Honor Citation ==
Rank and organization: Sergeant, U.S. Army, Company A, 105th Machine Gun Battalion, 27th Division. Place and date: At Ronssoy, France; September 27, 1918. Entered service at: New York, New York. Birth: February 12, 1894; Oslo, Norway. General Orders: War Department, General Orders No. 5 (1920).

Citation:

In the face of heavy artillery and machinegun fire, he crawled forward to a burning British tank, in which some of the crew were imprisoned, and succeeded in rescuing two men. Although the tank was then burning fiercely and contained ammunition which was likely to explode at any time, this soldier immediately returned to the tank and, entering it, made a search for the other occupants, remaining until he satisfied himself that there were no more living men in the tank.

== Military Awards ==
Waaler's military decorations and awards include:

1st row	Medal of Honor	World War I Victory Medal w/three bronze service stars to denote credit for the Somme Offensive, Ypres-Lys and Defensive Sector battle clasps.		
2nd row	Distinguished Conduct Medal (Great Britain)		Médaille militaire (French Republic)	Croix de guerre 1914–1918 w/bronze palm (French Republic)
3rd row	Croce al Merito di Guerra (Italy)		Medal for Military Bravery (Kingdom of Montenegro)	Medalha da Cruz de Guerra, Third Class (Portuguese Republic)

== See also ==
- List of Medal of Honor recipients
- List of Medal of Honor recipients for World War I
