= Palm City, Florida =

- Census-designated place
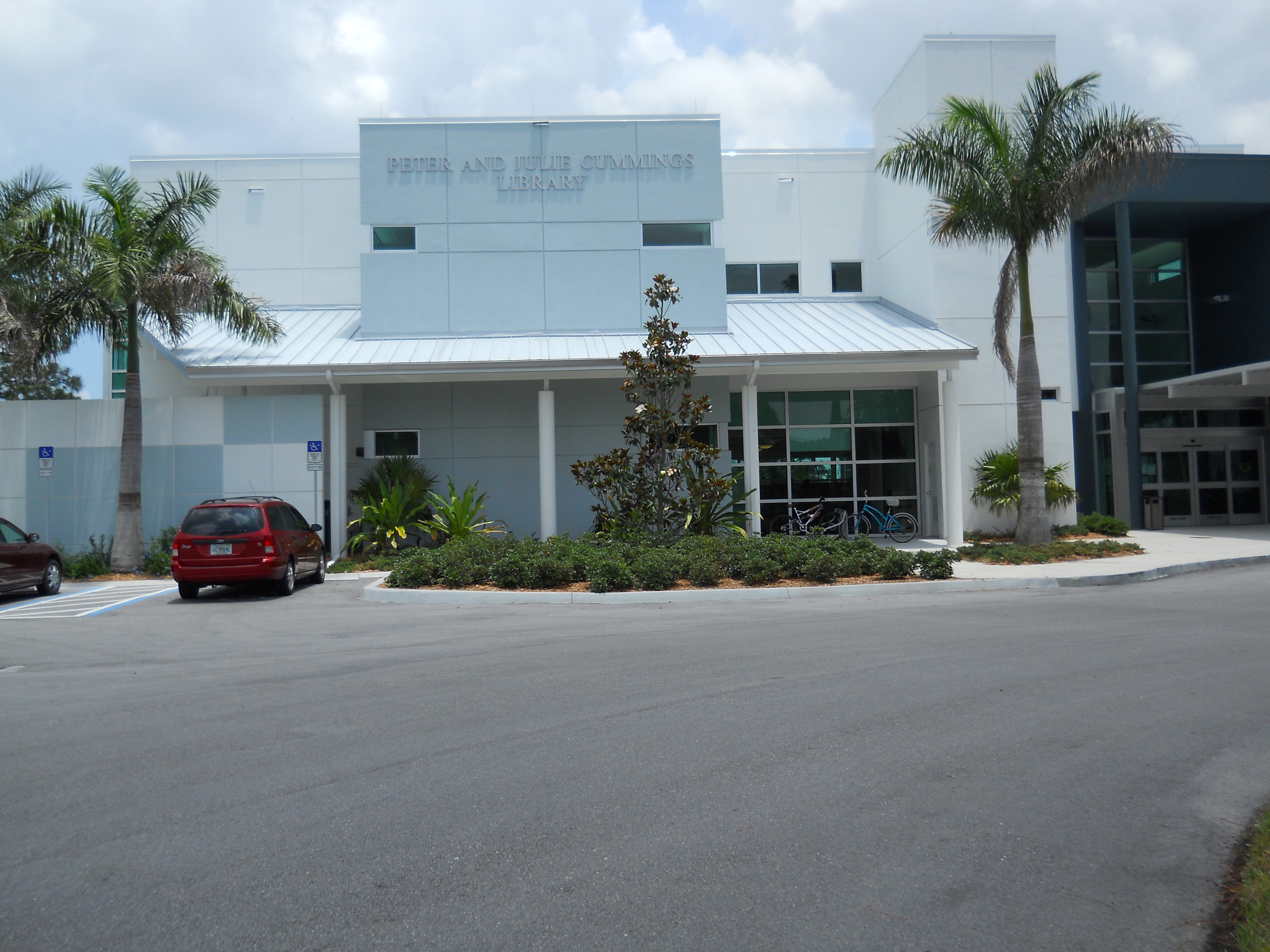
- Peter and Julie Cummings Library

- Location in Martin County and the state of Florida
- Coordinates: 27°08′55″N 80°16′43″W
- Country: United States
- State: Florida
- County: Martin

Area
  - Total: 16.38 sq mi (42.43 km^{2})
  - Land: 13.86 sq mi (35.90 km^{2})
  - Water: 2.52 sq mi (6.53 km^{2})
- Elevation: 7 ft (2.1 m)

Population (2020)
  - Total: 25,883
  - Density: 1,867.4/sq mi (721.02/km^{2})
- Time zone: UTC-5 (Eastern (EST))
  - Summer (DST): UTC-4 (EDT)
- ZIP codes: 34990-34991
- Area code: 772
- FIPS code: 12-54175
- GNIS feature ID: 2403389

Palm City is an unincorporated area and census-designated place (CDP) in Martin County, Florida, United States. The population was 25,883 at the 2020 census. It is part of the Port St. Lucie Metropolitan Statistical Area.

== Geography ==
Palm City is in northeast Martin County and is bordered by North River Shores to the northeast, Stuart, the county seat, to the east, the South Fork of the St. Lucie River to the southeast, Florida's Turnpike to the west and Port St. Lucie in St. Lucie County to the north. According to the United States Census Bureau, the Palm City CDP has a total area of 16.4 square miles (42 km^{2}), of which 13.9 square miles (36 km^{2}) are land and 2.5 square miles (6.5 km^{2}), or 15.39%, are water. Palm City is located 100 miles (160 km) north of Miami.

== Demographics ==
Historical population
Census	Pop.	Note	%±
2000	20,097		—
2010	23,120		15.0%
2020	25,883		12.0%
U.S. Decennial Census

=== 2020 census ===
As of the 2020 census, Palm City had a population of 25,883. The median age was 50.8 years. 20.0% of residents were under the age of 18 and 27.8% of residents were 65 years of age or older. For every 100 females there were 92.1 males, and for every 100 females age 18 and over there were 88.8 males age 18 and over.

100.0% of residents lived in urban areas, while 0.0% lived in rural areas.

There were 10,680 households and 6,799 families in Palm City, of which 27.1% had children under the age of 18 living in them. Of all households, 59.6% were married-couple households, 11.9% were households with a male householder and no spouse or partner present, and 23.6% were households with a female householder and no spouse or partner present. About 24.0% of all households were made up of individuals and 15.6% had someone living alone who was 65 years of age or older.

There were 11,651 housing units, of which 8.3% were vacant. The homeowner vacancy rate was 2.2% and the rental vacancy rate was 10.3%.

Palm City racial composition (Hispanics excluded from racial categories) (NH = Non-Hispanic)
Race	Number	Percentage
White (NH)	21,803	84.24%
Black or African American (NH)	253	0.98%
Native American or Alaska Native (NH)	35	0.14%
Asian (NH)	634	2.45%
Pacific Islander (NH)	14	0.05%
Some Other Race (NH)	90	0.35%
Mixed/Multi-Racial (NH)	859	3.32%
Hispanic or Latino	2,195	8.48%
Total	25,883	

Racial composition as of the 2020 census
Race	Number	Percent
White	22,407	86.6%
Black or African American	275	1.1%
American Indian and Alaska Native	57	0.2%
Asian	648	2.5%
Native Hawaiian and Other Pacific Islander	20	0.1%
Some other race	399	1.5%
Two or more races	2,077	8.0%
Hispanic or Latino (of any race)	2,195	8.5%

=== 2000 census ===
As of the census of 2000, there were 20,097 people, 8,458 households, and 6,301 families residing in the CDP. The population density was 1,373.4 inhabitants per square mile (530.3/km^{2}). There were 9,228 housing units at an average density of 630.6 per square mile (243.5/km^{2}). The racial makeup of the CDP was 96.56% White, 1.08% African American, 0.13% Native American, 1.03% Asian, 0.40% from other races, and 0.79% from two or more races. Hispanic or Latino of any race were 2.77% of the population.

There were 8,458 households, out of which 27.1% had children under the age of 18 living with them, 66.2% were married couples living together, 6.3% had a female householder with no husband present, and 25.5% were non-families. 21.5% of all households were made up of individuals, and 11.7% had someone living alone who was 65 years of age or older. The average household size was 2.35 and the average family size was 2.72.

In the CDP, the population was spread out, with 21.1% under the age of 18, 3.3% from 18 to 24, 22.5% from 25 to 44, 25.8% from 45 to 64, and 27.3% who were 65 years of age or older. The median age was 47 years. For every 100 females, there were 91.9 males. For every 100 females age 18 and over, there were 89.0 males.

The median income for a household in the CDP was $62,362, and the median income for a family was $69,688 (these figures had risen to $67,546 and $84,000 respectively as of a 2007 estimate). Males had a median income of $48,852 versus $33,699 for females. The per capita income for the CDP was $35,213. About 2.6% of families and 3.7% of the population were below the poverty line, including 5.3% of those under age 18 and 1.6% of those age 65 or over.

=== Neighborhoods ===
- Bay Pointe
- Berry Estates
- Berry Grove
- Canoe Creek
- Carmel
- Charter Club
- Cobblestone Country Club
- Copperleaf
- Canopy Creek
- Crane Creek
- Cypress Lake
- Danforth
- Evergreen Golf Club
- Four Rivers
- Fox Run
- Granada
- Hammock Creek Estates
- Hammock Creek Preserve
- Hammock Creek Sanctuary
- Harbour Pointe
- Harbour Ridge
- Hidden Bay
- Highlands Reserve
- Hunters Creek
- Islesworth
- Lake Grove
- Lake Village, formerly The Crossings
- La Mariposa
- Lighthouse Point
- Martin Downs Country Club
- Monarch Country Club
- Murano
- Naked Lady Ranch Airport
- Oakbrooke Estates
- Oak Ridge
- Old Palm City
- Orchid Bay
- Palm City Farms
- Palm Cove Golf & Yacht Club
- Palm Isles
- Palm Pointe
- Parkside
- Pelican Cove
- Pine Ridge
- Pipers Landing
- River Landing
- Riverbend
- Rustic Hills
- Seagate Harbor
- Sawgrass Villas
- St. Lucie Shores
- Stratford Downs
- Stuart West
- Sunset Trace
- The Meadows
- Tiburon
- Westwood County Estates
- Whispering Sound
- Windstone
- Woodside

== Government ==
Palm City is an unincorporated town located in Martin County, governed by the Board of County Commissioners. Martin County is divided into 5 districts. Palm City is represented by Ed Ciampi as part of District 5. All governmental functions are carried out by the county offices.

Police protection is provided by the Martin County Sheriff's Office. The Sheriff's Office provides coverage for most of Martin county from their headquarters in Stuart.

Fire and EMS services are provided by Station 21 of the Martin County Fire Rescue (Engine 21, Rescue 21, Brush 21, Tanker 21).

== Education ==
=== Middle schools ===
- Hidden Oaks Middle School

=== Elementary schools ===
- Bessey Creek Elementary School
- Citrus Grove Elementary School
- Palm City Elementary School

=== Private schools ===
- Alphabet Farms (Private Preschool)
- Appletree Academy (Private Preschool)
- High Hopes (Private Preschool)
- Immanuel Early Learning Center (Private Preschool)
- Little Peoples Academy (Private Preschool)
- Martin Downs Montessori School (Private Preschool/Kindergarten)
- Peace Christian Academy (Private K-12)
- The Learning Cover (Private Preschool)
- United Methodist (Private Preschool)

=== Libraries ===
- Peter and Julie Cummings Library - Palm City branch of the Martin County Library System

== Infrastructure ==
=== Transportation ===
- Florida's Turnpike
- I-95

== Notable people ==
- Dickey Betts, founding member of The Allman Brothers Band
- Dan Bongino, 20th deputy director of the Federal Bureau of Investigation (FBI) beginning in 2025.
- Edgar Cortright, former director of the NASA Langley Research Center and chairman of the Apollo 13 Review Board
- Ken Duke, PGA Tour golfer
- John A. Kjellstrom, lieutenant general in the United States Army and former Army comptroller
- Walter Philip Leber, governor of the Panama Canal Zone from 1967 to 1971
- Brian Mast, U.S. representative for Florida's 21st congressional district
- Tom Phoebus, MLB pitcher, Baltimore Orioles, World Series champion
- Kathy Rinaldi, former world No. 7 professional tennis player
- Nick Snyder, professional baseball pitcher who has played for the Texas Rangers
- Eugene Stoner, inventor of the M16 rifle
- Reidar Waaler, American soldier of Norwegian birth, earned the Medal of Honor
- Percy Wood, former president and Chief operating officer of United Airlines
