= John A. Kjellstrom =

American military personnel

- Born: February 28, 1923; Rockford, Illinois, United States
- Died: October 19, 2015 (aged 92); Palm City, Florida
- Military career
- Allegiance: United States
- Branch: United States Army
- Service years: 1942–1977
- Rank: Lieutenant General

John Alfred Kjellstrom (February 28, 1923 – October 19, 2015) was a lieutenant general in the United States Army.

== Early life and education ==
Kjellstrom was born in Rockford, Illinois, the son of Mr & Mrs. Edwin N. Kjellstrom and brought up in Hebron, Illinois where he played basketball and was part of the Hebron team which reached the state tournament for the first time (Hebron went on to win it in 1952).

He enlisted in the Army in December 1942 and was commissioned in June 1944. Kjellstrom later studied at the University of Maryland and completed a Bachelor of Science degree in 1956. He went on to gain a Master of Science degree in international affairs at George Washington University in 1965. Kjellstrom graduated from Air University in 1950, the Naval War College in 1957 and the Army War College in 1965.

== Military career ==
In World War II, Kjellstrom was a platoon leader with the 76th Infantry Division. During the Korean War, he was a Staff Officer with Logistical Command in Japan. He commanded the 14th Inventory Control Center during the Vietnam War. He went on to serve as Director of Army Budget before becoming the Comptroller of the Army in 1974 retiring in 1977.

== Later life and death ==
After retirement, Kjellstrom and his wife Dorothy (Ellis) Kjellstrom (1921–2006) moved to Jekyll Island, Georgia, then to Melbourne, Florida before finally settling in Palm City.

Kjellstrom died on October 19, 2015. He was 91. Kjellstrom was interred next to his wife, who had predeceased him, at Arlington National Cemetery on July 18, 2016.
