= 1962 Minnesota Attorney General election =

- November 6, 1962
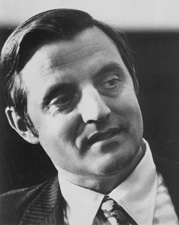

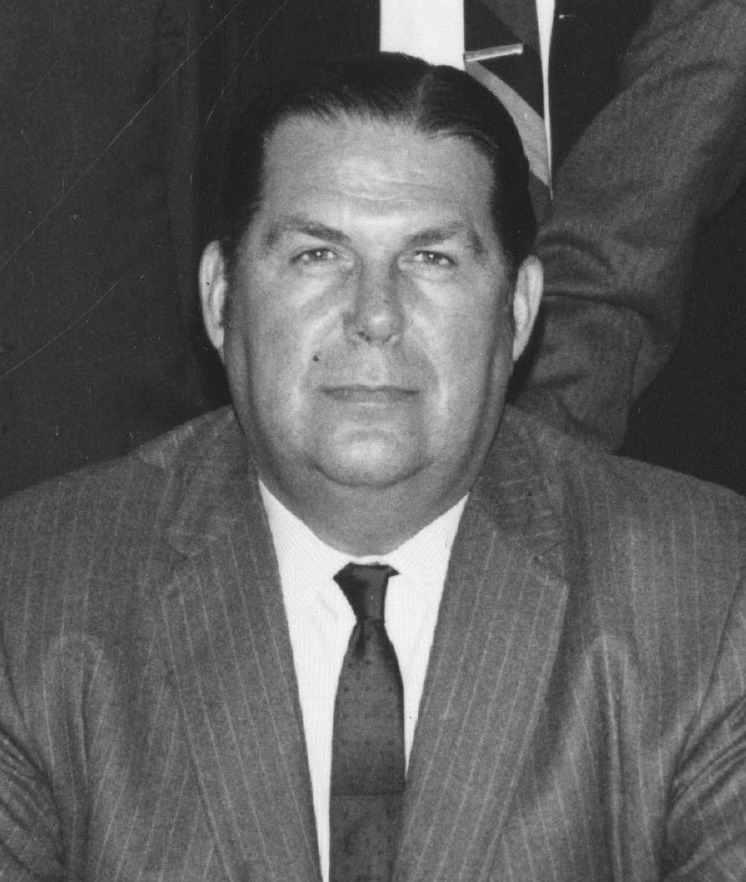
Nominee	Walter Mondale	Robert Lowe Kunzig
Party	Democratic (DFL)	Republican
Popular vote	730,783	494,621
Percentage	59.64%	40.36%
- County results Mondale: 50–60% 60–70% 70–80% Kunzig: 50–60% 60–70%
Attorney General before election
Walter Mondale
Democratic (DFL)
Elected Attorney General
Walter Mondale
Democratic (DFL)

The 1962 Minnesota Attorney General election was held on November 6, 1962, in order to elect the attorney general of Minnesota. Democratic–Farmer–Labor (DFL) nominee and incumbent attorney general Walter Mondale defeated the Republican nominee, Robert Lowe Kunzig.

== General election ==
On the election day, November 6, 1962, Democratic–Farmer–Labor (DFL) nominee Walter Mondale won re-election by a margin of 236,162 votes against his opponent Republican nominee, Robert Lowe Kunzig, thereby retaining Democratic–Farmer–Labor control over the office of attorney general. Mondale was sworn in for his second full term on January 8, 1963.

=== Results ===
Minnesota Attorney General election, 1962
Party	Candidate	Votes	%
Democratic (DFL)	Walter Mondale (incumbent)	730,783	59.64
Republican	Robert Lowe Kunzig	494,621	40.36
Total votes		1,225,404	100.00
Democratic (DFL) hold			
