= Walter Mondale =

Vice President of the United States from 1977 to 1981

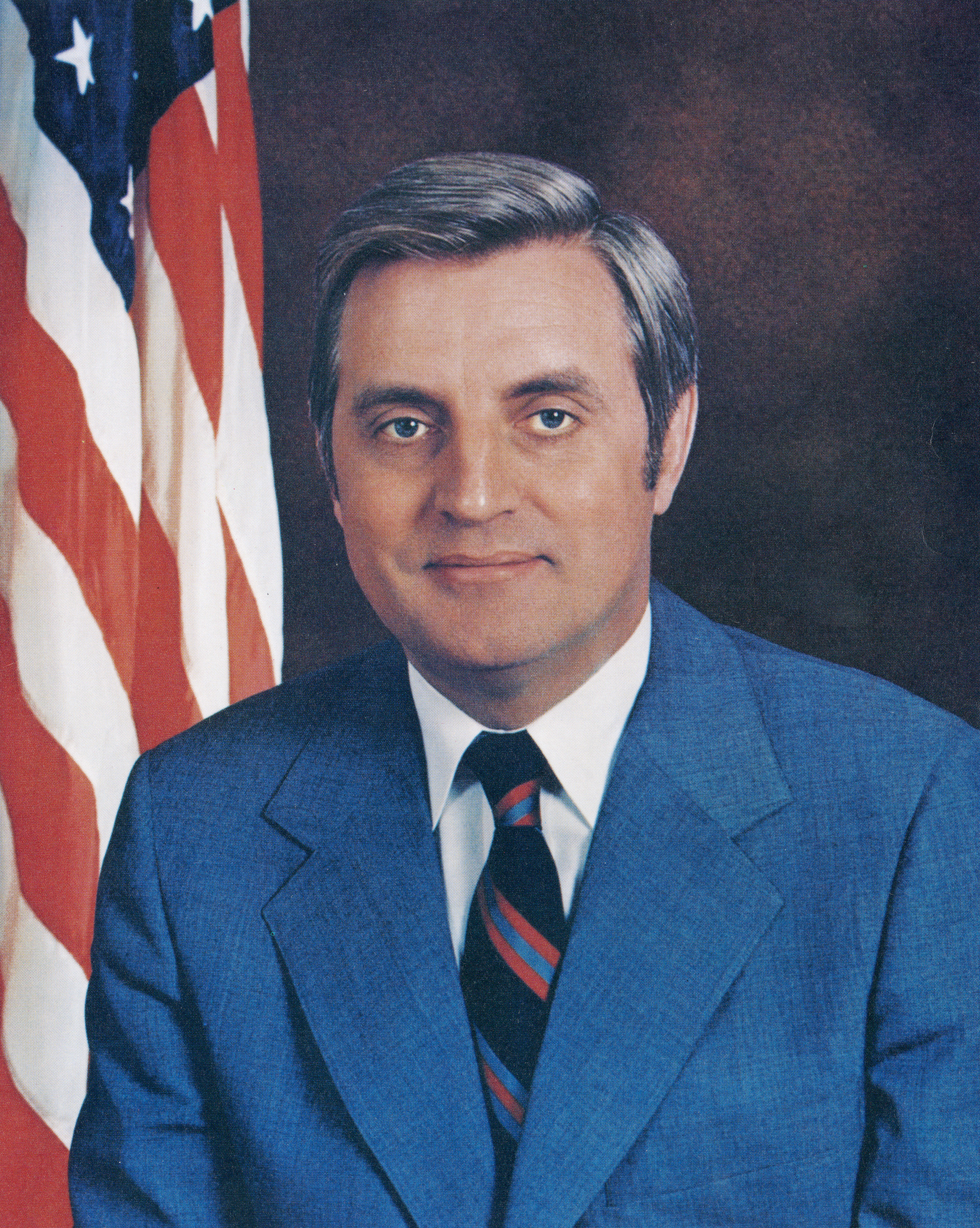
- Official portrait, 1977

42nd Vice President of the United States
- In office January 20, 1977 – January 20, 1981
- President: Jimmy Carter
- Preceded by: Nelson Rockefeller
- Succeeded by: George H. W. Bush

United States Ambassador to Japan
- In office September 21, 1993 – December 15, 1996
- President: Bill Clinton
- Preceded by: Michael Armacost
- Succeeded by: Tom Foley

United States Senator from Minnesota
- In office December 30, 1964 – December 30, 1976
- Preceded by: Hubert Humphrey
- Succeeded by: Wendell R. Anderson

23rd Attorney General of Minnesota
- In office May 4, 1960 – December 30, 1964
- Governor: Orville Freeman; Elmer Andersen; Karl Rolvaag
- Preceded by: Miles Lord
- Succeeded by: Robert Mattson

Personal details
- Born: Walter Frederick Mondale; January 5, 1928 Ceylon, Minnesota, U.S.
- Died: April 19, 2021 (aged 93) Minneapolis, Minnesota, U.S.
- Party: Democratic (DFL)
- Spouse: Joan Adams (m. 1955; died 2014)
- Children: 3, including Ted and Eleanor
- Education: Macalester College (attended); University of Minnesota (BA, LLB)

Military service
- Branch/service: United States Army
- Years of service: 1951–1953
- Rank: Corporal
- Unit: 3rd Armored Division Artillery
- Battles/wars: Korean War
- Mondale's voice Mondale on Central American civil wars and internal conflicts Recorded October 21, 1984

Walter Frederick "Fritz" Mondale (January 5, 1928 – April 19, 2021) was an American politician who was the 42nd vice president of the United States, serving from 1977 to 1981 under President Jimmy Carter. A member of the Democratic Party, he represented Minnesota in the United States Senate from 1964 to 1976, and was the Democratic nominee in the 1984 presidential election.

Mondale was born in the small municipality of Ceylon, Minnesota, and graduated from the University of Minnesota in 1951 after attending Macalester College. He then served in the U.S. Army during the Korean War before earning a law degree in 1956. He married Joan Mondale in 1955. Working as a lawyer in Minneapolis, Mondale was appointed Minnesota Attorney General in 1960 by Governor Orville Freeman and was elected to a full term as attorney general in 1962 with 60% of the vote. He was appointed to the U.S. Senate by Governor Karl Rolvaag upon the resignation of U.S. senator Hubert Humphrey following Humphrey's election as vice president in 1964. Mondale was elected to a full Senate term in 1966 and reelected in 1972, resigning in 1976 as he prepared to succeed to the vice presidency in 1977. While in the Senate, he supported consumer protection, fair housing, tax reform, and the desegregation of schools; he served on the Church Committee.

In 1976, Jimmy Carter, the Democratic presidential nominee, chose Mondale as his vice-presidential running mate. The Carter–Mondale ticket narrowly defeated the Republican ticket of incumbent president Gerald Ford and his running mate Bob Dole. The economy worsened during Carter and Mondale's time in office, and they lost the 1980 presidential election in a landslide to Republicans Ronald Reagan and George H. W. Bush. In 1984, Mondale won the Democratic presidential nomination and campaigned for a nuclear freeze, the ratification of the Equal Rights Amendment, an increase in taxes, and a reduction of U.S. public debt. His vice presidential nominee, U.S. representative Geraldine Ferraro from New York, was the first female vice-presidential nominee of any major party in U.S. history. Mondale and Ferraro lost the election to the incumbents Reagan and Bush, with Reagan winning 49 states and Mondale carrying only his home state of Minnesota and Washington, D.C.

After his defeat, Mondale joined the Minnesota-based law firm Dorsey & Whitney and the National Democratic Institute (1986–1993). President Bill Clinton appointed Mondale United States ambassador to Japan in 1993; he retired from that post in 1996. In 2002, Mondale became the last-minute choice of the Minnesota Democratic–Farmer–Labor Party to run for Senate after Democratic U.S. Senate member Paul Wellstone was killed in a plane crash less than two weeks before the election. Mondale narrowly lost the race to the mayor of Saint Paul, Minnesota, Norm Coleman. He returned to working at Dorsey & Whitney and remained active in the Democratic Party. Mondale later took up a part-time teaching position at the University of Minnesota's Humphrey School of Public Affairs. He died in 2021 from natural causes.

== Early life ==
Walter Frederick Mondale was born on January 5, 1928, in Ceylon, Minnesota, to Theodore Sigvaard Mondale, a Methodist minister, and his second wife Claribel Hope (née Cowan), a part-time music teacher. Mondale had two full brothers, Clarence, (known as Pete) and William (known as Mort). Their half-brother Lester Mondale became a Unitarian minister. The brothers' paternal grandparents were Norwegian immigrants, with some distant German ancestry, and their paternal grandfather Frederik Mundal had emigrated from Norway with his family in 1856, eventually settling in the southern part of Minnesota in 1864. The surname "Mondale" was Americanized from that of Mundal, a valley and village in the Fjærland region of Norway. His mother was born in Iowa, the daughter of a Canadian immigrant father, Robert Cowan (1861-1950), who was born a British subject in Seaforth, Ontario six years before Canadian Confederation; she was of Scottish and English descent.

In his youth, Mondale's family thought the names "Walter" and "Frederick" were too stilted for a boy, so they called him "Fritz", a common German and Scandinavian diminutive form of Friedrich or Frederick. Due to the Great Depression, Mondale grew up in poverty. His family moved from Ceylon to Heron Lake in 1934, and to Elmore in 1937. Throughout his youth, Mondale was influenced heavily by his father's religious beliefs, including support for the civil rights movement. In 1948, his father died of a stroke. Mondale attended public schools and then Macalester College for two years before transferring to the University of Minnesota, from which he graduated cum laude with a Bachelor of Arts degree in political science in 1951.

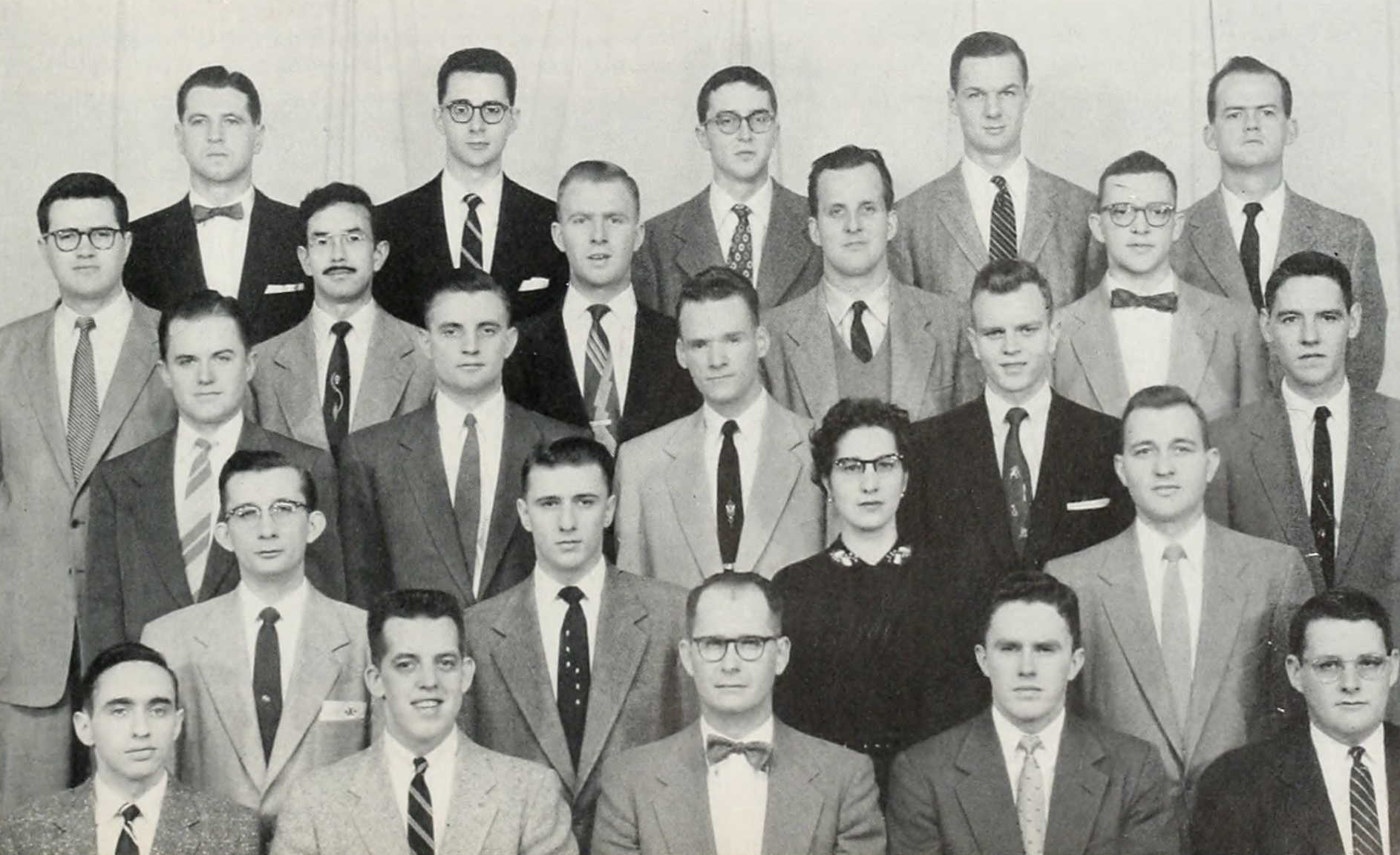
Mondale (middle row, second from left) with other staff members of the Minnesota Law Review, 1955

As Mondale could not afford to attend law school, he enlisted in the United States Army in 1951, shortly after graduating. He served with the 3rd Armored Division Artillery at Fort Knox, Kentucky, during the Korean War, first as an armored reconnaissance vehicle crewman, and later as an education programs specialist and associate editor of the unit's newsletter, Tanker's Dust. He attained the rank of corporal and was honorably discharged in 1953. With money earned from his military service, Mondale enrolled at the University of Minnesota Law School, aided by the G.I. Bill, and graduated cum laude with a Bachelor of Laws in 1956. In law school, he served on the Minnesota Law Review and as a law clerk for Minnesota Supreme Court justice Thomas F. Gallagher. In 1955, Mondale married Joan Adams, whom he met on a blind date. He then practiced law in Minneapolis for four years before entering politics.

== Entry into politics ==
Mondale became involved in national politics in the 1940s. At age 20, he was visible in Minnesota politics by helping organize Hubert Humphrey's successful Senate campaign in 1948. Humphrey's campaign assigned Mondale to cover the staunchly Republican 2nd district. Mondale, who had grown up in the region, was able to win the district for Humphrey by a comfortable margin. After working with Humphrey, Mondale went on to work on several campaigns for Orville Freeman. Mondale worked on Freeman's unsuccessful 1952 campaign for the governorship as well as his successful campaign in 1954 and his 1958 reelection campaign. In 1960, Freeman appointed Mondale Minnesota Attorney General following the resignation of Miles Lord. At the time he was appointed, Mondale was 32 years old and had been practicing law for four years. He was elected to the post in his own right in 1962.

External videos
- "Interview with Walter Mondale" conducted in 1986 for the Eyes on the Prize documentary in which his efforts to effect a compromise at the 1964 Democratic National Convention between the Mississippi Freedom Democratic Party and the official Democratic delegates.

During his tenure as Minnesota Attorney General, the case Gideon v. Wainwright (which ultimately established the right of defendants in state courts to have a lawyer) was being heard by the U.S. Supreme Court. When those opposed to the right to counsel organized a friend of the court brief representing several state attorneys general for that position, Mondale organized a countering friend of the court brief from many more state attorneys general, arguing that defendants must be allowed a lawyer. He also continued the investigation of former mayor of Minneapolis Marvin L. Kline and the mismanagement of the Courage Kenny Rehabilitation Institute. At the 1964 Democratic National Convention, Mondale played a major role in the proposed but ultimately unsuccessful compromise by which the national Democratic Party offered the Mississippi Freedom Democratic Party two at-large seats. Mondale also served as a member of the President's Consumer Advisory Council from 1960 to 1964.

== U.S. Senate (1964–1976) ==
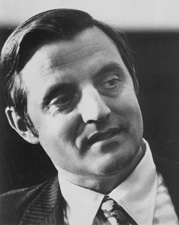
Senator Walter F. Mondale

On December 30, 1964, Governor of Minnesota Karl Rolvaag appointed Mondale to the United States Senate to fill the vacancy created by Hubert Humphrey's resignation; Humphrey had stepped down after being elected Vice President of the United States. Mondale was elected to the Senate for the first time in 1966, defeating Republican Party candidate Robert A. Forsythe by a margin of 53.9% to 45.2%.

In 1972, Democratic presidential candidate George McGovern from South Dakota offered Mondale an opportunity to be his vice-presidential running mate; he declined. That year, Mondale was re-elected to the U.S. Senate with over 57% of the vote, even as Republican president Richard Nixon carried Minnesota. He served in the 88th United States Congress, the 89th United States Congress, the 90th United States Congress, the 91st United States Congress, the 92nd United States Congress, the 93rd United States Congress, and the 94th United States Congress.

=== Policies ===
Mondale worked hard to build up the center of the party on economic and social issues. Unlike his father, a fervent liberal, he was not a crusader for the New Deal. Instead, he realized that the Democratic base (especially ethnic blue-collar workers) was gradually moving to the right, and he worked to keep their support. Mondale showed little or no interest in foreign policy until about 1974, when he realized that some foreign policy knowledge was necessary if he had loftier aspirations than the Senate. He developed a centrist position, avoiding alignment with either the party's hawks (such as Henry M. Jackson) or its doves (such as McGovern).

Mondale took a liberal position on civil rights, which proved acceptable in Minnesota, a state with "a minuscule black population". Mondale was a chief sponsor of the federal Fair Housing Act as part of the Civil Rights Act of 1968, which prohibits discrimination in housing and created the United States Department of Housing and Urban Development's Office of Fair Housing and Equal Opportunity as the primary enforcer of the law. During Lyndon B. Johnson's presidency, Mondale supported the Vietnam War. After Nixon became president in 1969, Mondale began to oppose the war and participated in legislation to restrict Nixon's ability to prolong it. Mondale supported abortion rights.

=== Committees ===
Mondale rotated on and off numerous committees, including the United States Senate Committee on Aeronautical and Space Sciences; the United States Senate Committee on Finance; the United States Senate Committee on Health, Education, Labor and Pensions; the United States Senate Committee on the Budget; and the United States Senate Committee on Banking, Housing, and Urban Affairs. He also served as chairman of the Select Committee on Equal Education Opportunity and the United States Senate Select Committee on Intelligence's Domestic Task Force. He additionally served as chairman of the Labor and Public Welfare Committee's subcommittee on Children and Youth and the Senate subcommittee on social security financing.

In 1975, Mondale served on the Committee to Study Governmental Operations with Respect to Intelligence Activities, chaired by U.S. Senate member Frank Church of Idaho, that investigated alleged abuses by the Central Intelligence Agency and the Federal Bureau of Investigation. Documents declassified in 2017 show that the National Security Agency had created a file on Mondale as part of its monitoring of prominent U.S. citizens whose names appeared in signals intelligence.

=== Apollo 1 accident (1967) ===
In 1967, Mondale served on the Aeronautical and Space Sciences Committee, then chaired by Clinton Anderson, when astronauts Gus Grissom, Ed White, and Roger B. Chaffee were killed in a fire on January 27 while testing the Apollo 204 (later renumbered Apollo 1) spacecraft. NASA administrator James E. Webb secured President Lyndon Johnson's approval for NASA to internally investigate the cause of the accident according to its established procedures, subject to Congressional oversight. NASA's procedure called for Deputy Administrator (and de facto general manager) Robert Seamans to appoint and oversee an investigative panel.

In February, a reporter leaked to Mondale the existence of a Phillips report issued in 1965 by Apollo program director Samuel C. Phillips, detailing management, cost, delivery, and quality problems of the Apollo prime contractor North American Aviation. In the February 27 hearing, Mondale asked Webb if he knew of such a report. Webb had not yet seen the December 1965 written report, so he responded in the negative. Seamans had passed along to Webb neither the written report nor the briefing presentation made to him in January 1966 by Phillips and Phillips's boss, Manned Space Flight Administrator George Mueller. Both Seamans and Mueller had also been called to testify at this session. Mueller denied the report's existence, though he must have been aware of it, as he had appended his own strongly worded letter to the copy sent to North American Aviation president John Leland Atwood.

Seamans was afraid Mondale might be in possession of a copy (he was not), so he admitted that NASA often reviewed its contractors' performance, with both positive and negative results, but claimed that was nothing extraordinary. Under repeated questioning from Mondale, Webb promised that he would investigate whether the "Phillips Report" existed, and if so, whether a controlled release could be made to Congress. Immediately after the hearing, Webb saw the Phillips report for the first time. The controversy spread to both houses of Congress and grew (through the efforts of Mondale's fellow committee member, Republican U.S. Senate member Margaret Chase Smith from Maine to include the second-guessing of NASA's original selection in 1961 of North American as the prime Apollo spacecraft contractor, which Webb became forced to defend). The House NASA oversight committee, which was conducting its own hearings and had picked up on the controversy, was ultimately given a copy of the Phillips report.

While the committee, as a whole, believed that NASA should have informed Congress of the Phillips review results in 1966, its final report issued on January 30, 1968, concluded (as had NASA's own accident investigation completed on April 5, 1967) that "the findings of the [Phillips] task force had no effect on the accident, did not lead to the accident, and were not related to the accident". Yet Mondale wrote a minority opinion accusing NASA of "evasiveness,... lack of candor, ... patronizing attitude exhibited toward Congress, ... refusal to respond fully and forthrightly to legitimate congressional inquiries, and ... solicitous concern for corporate sensitivities at a time of national tragedy". Mondale explained his actions in a 2001 interview: "I think that by forcing a public confrontation about these heretofore secret and deep concerns about the safety and the management of the program, it forced NASA to restructure and reorganize the program in a way that was much safer."

== Vice presidency (1977–1981) ==
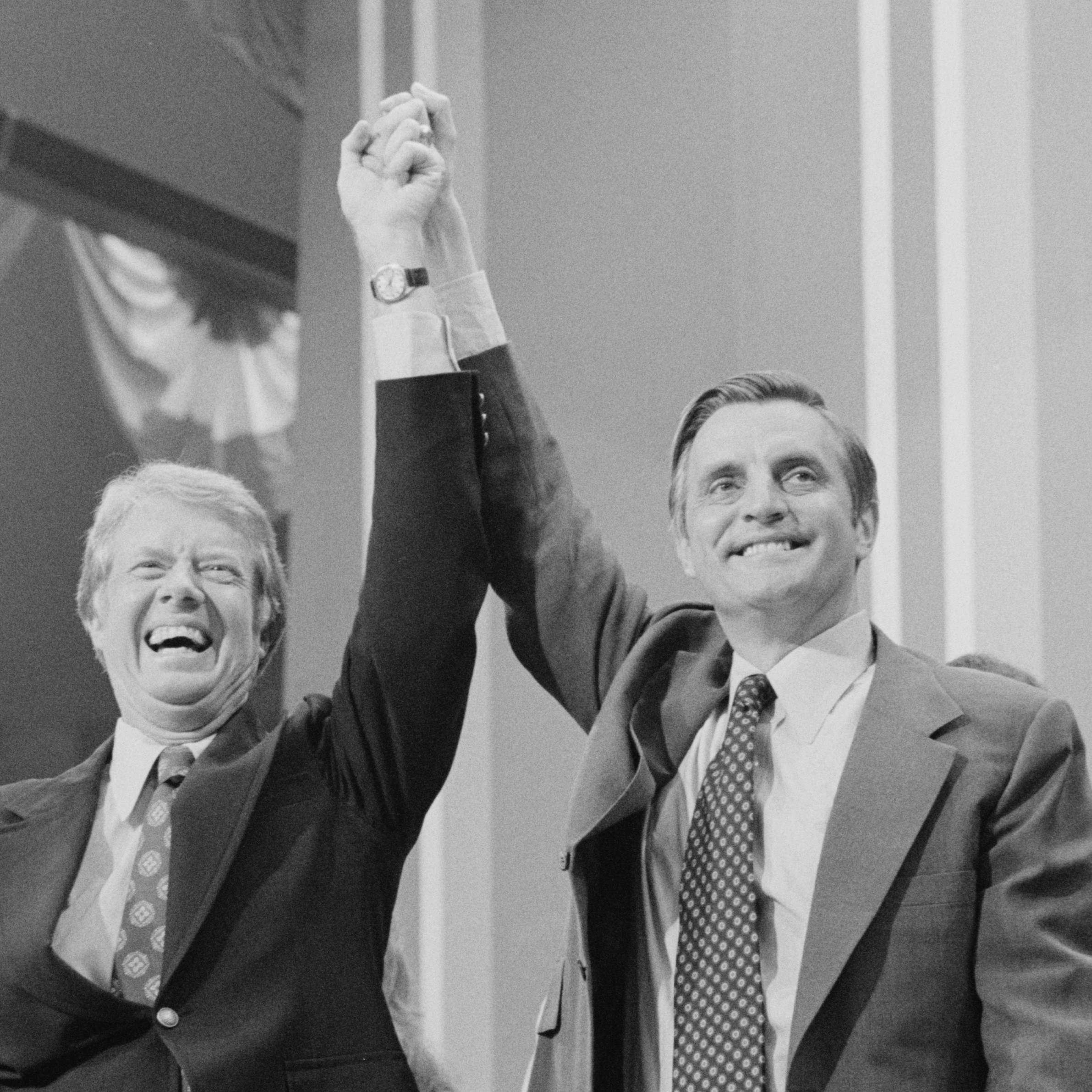
Carter (left) and Mondale at the 1976 Democratic National Convention

When Jimmy Carter won the Democratic nomination for President of the United States in 1976, he chose Mondale as his running mate. Mondale campaigned for the ticket in various states. While campaigning in Toledo, Ohio he said that the country needed a strong president to stop inflation and added that President Gerald Ford did not have the guts to stand up to big businesses. The ticket was narrowly elected on November 2, 1976, and Mondale was inaugurated as Vice President of the United States on January 20, 1977. He also became the first vice president to live at Number One Observatory Circle.

Under Carter, Mondale traveled extensively throughout the nation and the world advocating the administration's foreign policy. His travels also included a visit to the USS Midway (CV-41), which was on station at the time in the Indian Ocean during the Iran hostage crisis. Mondale was the first vice president to have an office in the White House and established the concept of an "activist Vice President". He had weekly lunches with the president and expanded the vice president's role from figurehead to presidential advisor, full-time participant, and troubleshooter for the administration. Subsequent vice presidents have followed this model. In 1979, Twin Cities Public Television produced a documentary about his trip to Norway, titled Walter Mondale: There's a Fjord in Your Past, a play on the well-known advertising slogan "There's a Ford in Your Future".

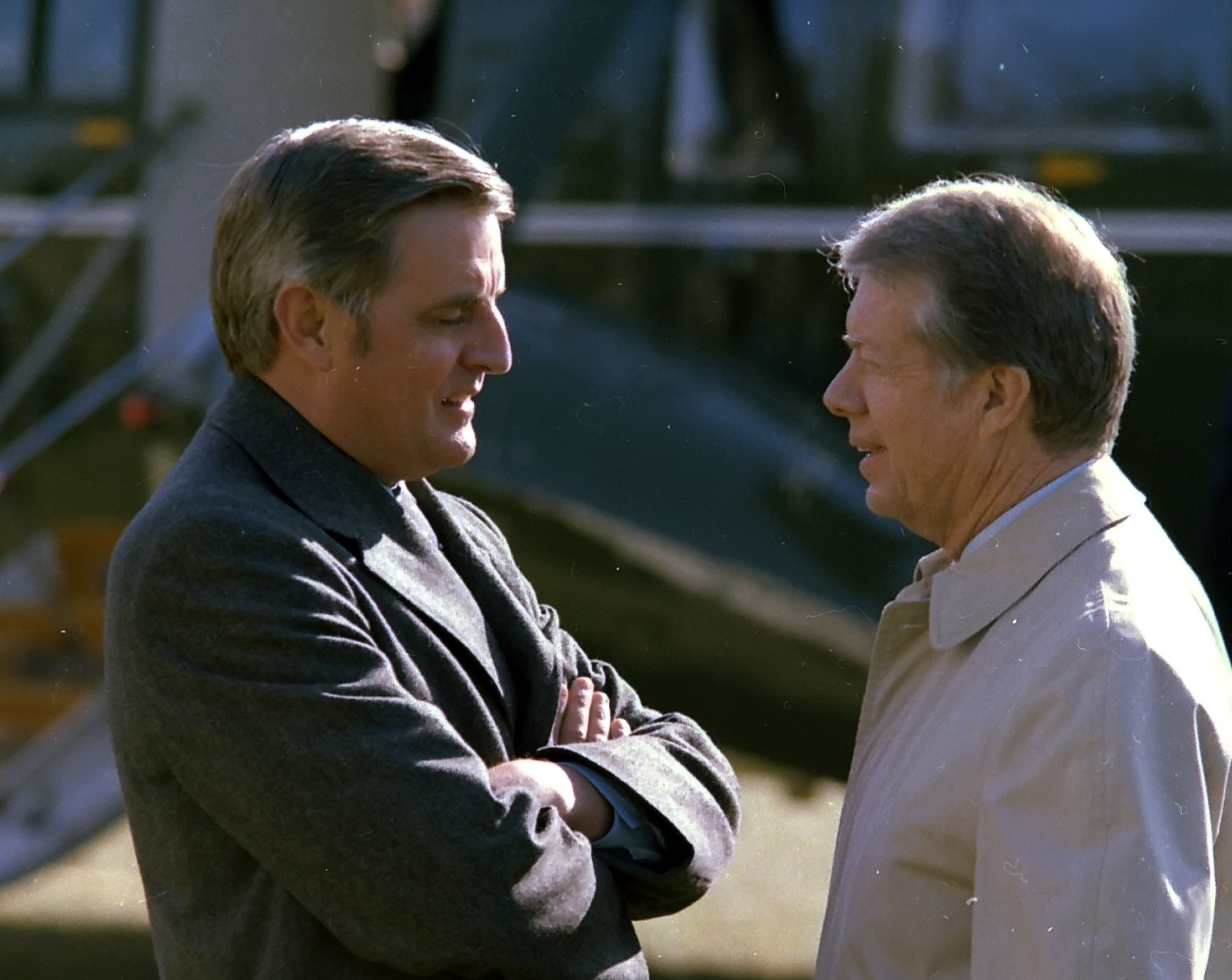
Mondale and Carter in January 1979

Mondale cast one tie-breaking vote in the U.S. Senate on November 4, 1977, allowing the Social Security financing bill to be passed.

In 1980, Mondale opened the Olympic Winter Games in Lake Placid, New York; as of 2026, he was the most recent non-head of state of a republic to open any Olympic Games.

=== 1980 election ===
Carter and Mondale were renominated at the 1980 Democratic National Convention, but soundly lost to the Republican ticket of Ronald Reagan and George H. W. Bush.

Carter and Mondale were the longest-living post-presidential team in American history. On May 23, 2006, they had been out of office for 9,254 days (25 years, 4 months and 3 days), surpassing the former record established by President John Adams and Vice President Thomas Jefferson, both of whom died on July 4, 1826. On September 8, 2012, Carter surpassed Herbert Hoover as the president with the longest retirement from office. On April 23, 2014, Mondale surpassed Richard Nixon as the vice president with the longest retirement from office at 12,146 days (33 years, 3 months and 3 days). At the time of his death, Mondale was the oldest living U.S. vice president and Carter was the oldest living U.S. president.

== Post-vice presidency (1981–2021) ==
=== 1984 presidential campaign ===
After losing the 1980 election, Mondale returned briefly to the practice of law at Winston & Strawn, a large Chicago-based law firm, but he intended to return to politics before long.

Mondale ran for the Democratic Party presidential nomination in the Democratic presidential primaries preceding the 1984 election, and was soon the front-runner. His opposition included Reverend Jesse Jackson and Senator Gary Hart from Colorado. Hart won the New Hampshire primary in March, but Mondale had much of the party leadership behind him. To great effect, Mondale used the Wendy's slogan "Where's the beef?" to describe Hart's policies as lacking depth. Jackson, widely regarded as the first serious African-American candidate for president, held on longer, but Mondale gained the nomination with the majority of delegates.

A Mondale—Ferraro bumper sticker

At the Democratic National Convention, Mondale chose United States House of Representatives member Geraldine Ferraro from New York as his running mate, making her the first woman nominated for that position by a major party. Aides later said that Mondale was determined to make a historic choice with his vice presidential candidate, having considered San Francisco Mayor Dianne Feinstein (female and Jewish); Los Angeles Mayor Tom Bradley, an African American; and San Antonio Mayor Henry Cisneros, a Mexican American, as finalists. Others preferred U.S. Senator Lloyd Bentsen of Texas because he would appeal to voters in the Deep South which would balance the ticket, or even nomination rival Gary Hart that could have unified the party. Ferraro, as a Catholic, was harshly criticized by some Catholic Church leaders for being pro-choice. Much more controversy erupted over her changing positions about the release of her husband's tax returns, and her own ethics record in the House. Ferraro was on the defensive throughout much of the campaign, largely negating her breakthrough as the first woman on a major national ticket. She was also the first Italian American to reach that level in American politics.

When Mondale made his acceptance speech at the Democratic Convention, he said: "By the end of my first term, I will reduce the Reagan budget deficit by two‑thirds. Let's tell the truth. It must be done, it must be done. Mr. Reagan will raise taxes, and so will I. He won't tell you. I just did." While this was meant to show that Mondale would be honest with voters, it was instead largely interpreted as a campaign pledge to raise taxes to spend on domestic programs, which was unappealing to many voters.

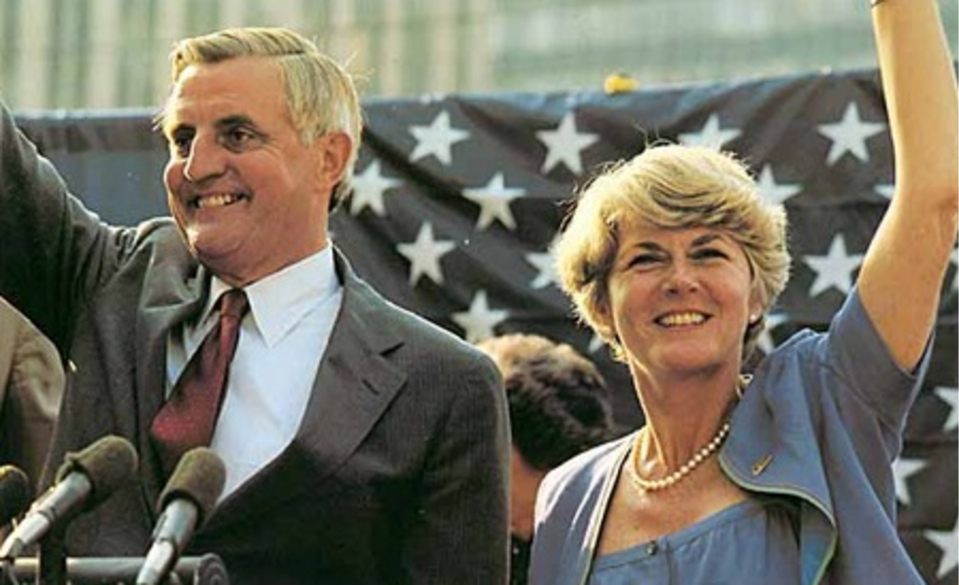
Mondale and Ferraro campaigning in 1984

Mondale ran a liberal campaign, supporting a Nuclear Freeze campaign and the Equal Rights Amendment (ERA). He spoke against Reaganonomics and in support of reducing federal deficit spending. However, the incumbent was popular, and Mondale's campaign was widely considered ineffective. Mondale was also perceived as supporting the poor at the expense of the middle class. In the first televised debate Mondale performed unexpectedly well, which led many to question Reagan's age and capacity to endure the grueling demands of the presidency (Reagan was the oldest person to serve as president—73 at the time—while Mondale was 56). In the next debate on October 21, 1984, Reagan deflected the issue by quipping, "I will not make age an issue of this campaign. I am not going to exploit, for political purposes, my opponent's youth and inexperience."

Mondale was defeated in one of the biggest landslides in American history, receiving 37,577,352 votes (40.6% of the popular vote), and winning only Washington, D.C. and his home state of Minnesota (even there his margin of victory was fewer than 3,800 votes), securing only 13 electoral votes to Reagan's 525. The result was the worst electoral college defeat for any Democratic Party candidate in history, and the worst for any major-party candidate since Alf Landon's loss to Franklin D. Roosevelt in 1936.

=== Private citizen and ambassador ===
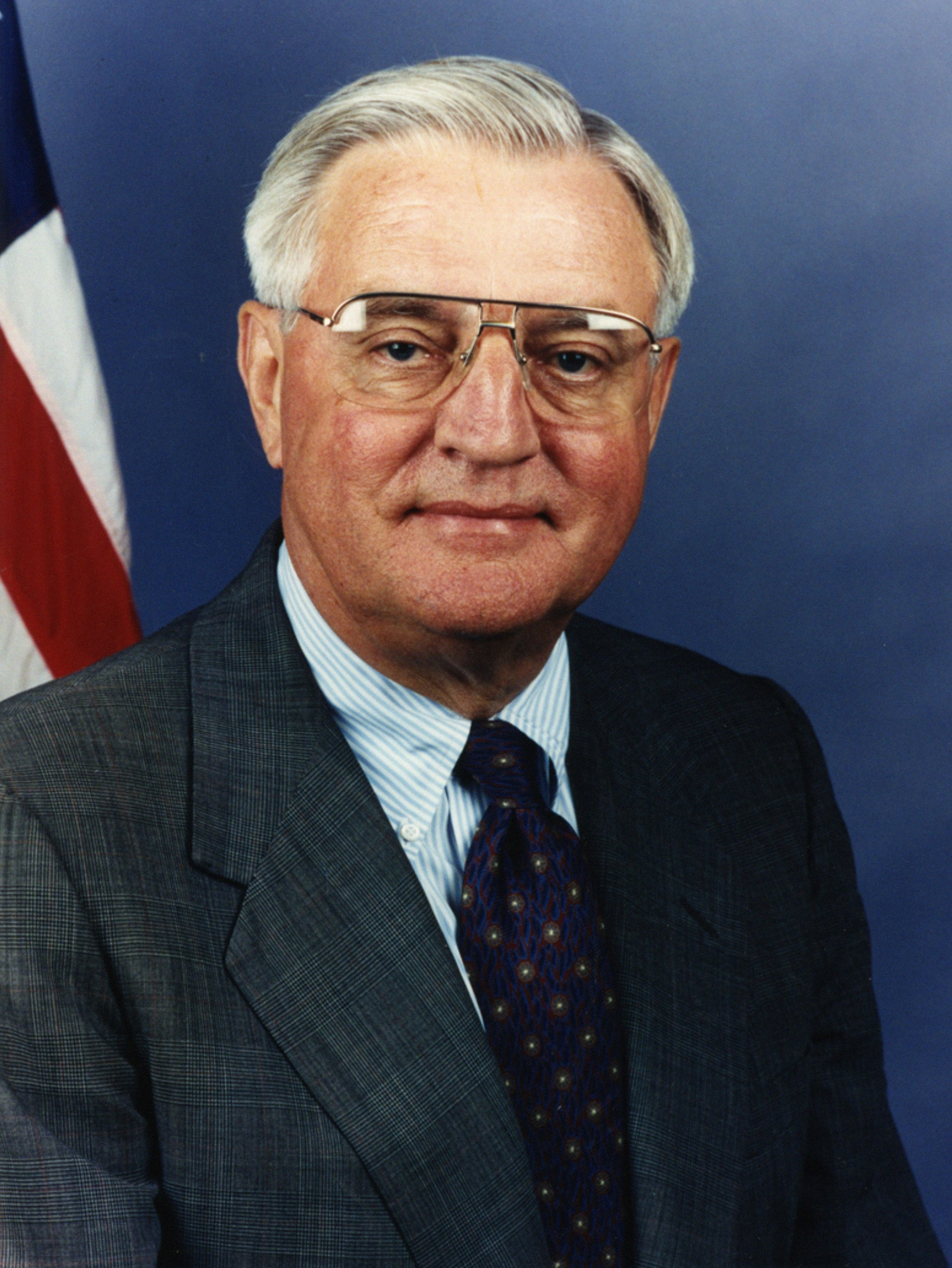
Official portrait as Ambassador, 1993

Mondale returned to private law practice with Dorsey & Whitney in Minneapolis in 1987. From 1986 to 1993, he chaired the National Democratic Institute for International Affairs.

During Bill Clinton's presidency, Mondale was United States Ambassador to Japan from 1993 to 1996. During his tenure, he oversaw the U.S. response to the 1995 Okinawa rape incident, when U.S. servicemen raped a 12-year old girl, with Mondale apologizing to Okinawa Governor Masahide Ōta. Mondale also chaired a bipartisan group to study campaign finance reform and served as Clinton's special envoy to Indonesia in 1998.

Until his appointment as Ambassador to Japan, Mondale was a Distinguished University Fellow in Law and Public Affairs at the Humphrey School of Public Affairs at the University of Minnesota. In 1990, he established the Mondale Policy Forum at the Humphrey Institute. The forum has brought together leading scholars and policymakers for annual conferences on domestic and international issues.

Mondale spoke before the U.S. Senate on September 4, 2002, delivering a lecture on his service, with commentary on the transformation of the office of the vice president during the Carter administration, the Senate cloture rule for ending debate, and his view of the future of the Senate. The lecture was a part of a continuing Senate "Leaders Lecture Series" that ran from 1998 to 2002.

=== 2002 U.S. Senate election and beyond ===
In the 2002 midterm elections, two term incumbent Democratic Senator Paul Wellstone from Minnesota, who was campaigning for reelection to a third term, tragically died in a plane crash 11 days before the November 5 election. Mondale quickly replaced Wellstone on the ballot at the urging of Wellstone's relatives. The Senate seat was the same one Mondale had held before resigning to become vice president in 1977.

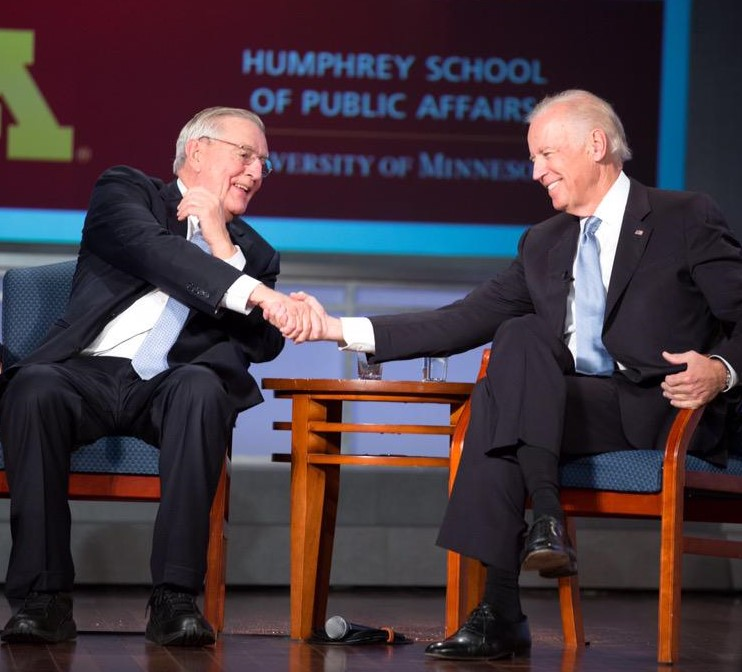
Mondale with Vice President and future 46th President Joe Biden in 2015

During his debate with the Republican nominee, former mayor of Saint Paul, Minnesota Norm Coleman, Mondale emphasized his experience, while painting Coleman as right-wing partisan in-line with then-president Bush. Mondale despite his popularity within Minnesota unexpectedly lost the election, receiving 1,067,246 votes (47.34%) to Coleman's 1,116,697 (49.53%). Upon conceding defeat, Mondale said, "At the end of what will be my last campaign, I want to say to Minnesota, you always treated me well, you always listened to me." Mondale's loss in this election made him the first major party candidate to lose an election in every state. Had Mondale won the election, he would have been the first former vice president since Hubert Humphrey in 1971 to serve in the Senate after leaving office.

In 2004, Mondale became co-chairman of the Constitution Project's bipartisan Right to Counsel Committee. He endorsed U.S. Senate member Hillary Clinton of New York for president in 2008. On June 3, 2008, following the final primary contests, Mondale endorsed U.S. Senate member Barack Obama of Illinois, who had clinched the nomination the previous evening, and ultimately won the presidency defeating Republican Party nominee John McCain.

Following the presidential election of 2004 and the midterm elections of 2006, Mondale is seen in the documentary Al Franken: God Spoke talking with Al Franken about the possibility of the latter running against Coleman for U.S. Senate in 2008. In the film, Mondale encourages Franken to run, but cautions him, saying that Coleman's allies and the Republican Party would look for anything they could use against him. Franken ultimately ran and won the 2008 Senate election by 312 votes, with Coleman contesting the election results until June 30, 2009. Mondale and U.S. Senate member Amy Klobuchar stood with Franken in the United States Senate chamber when Franken was sworn in on July 7, 2009.

Mondale then stood again with U.S. senator Klobuchar when Tina Smith was sworn in on January 3, 2018. He endorsed Klobuchar's unsuccessful campaign for president in February 2019.

== Family and personal life ==
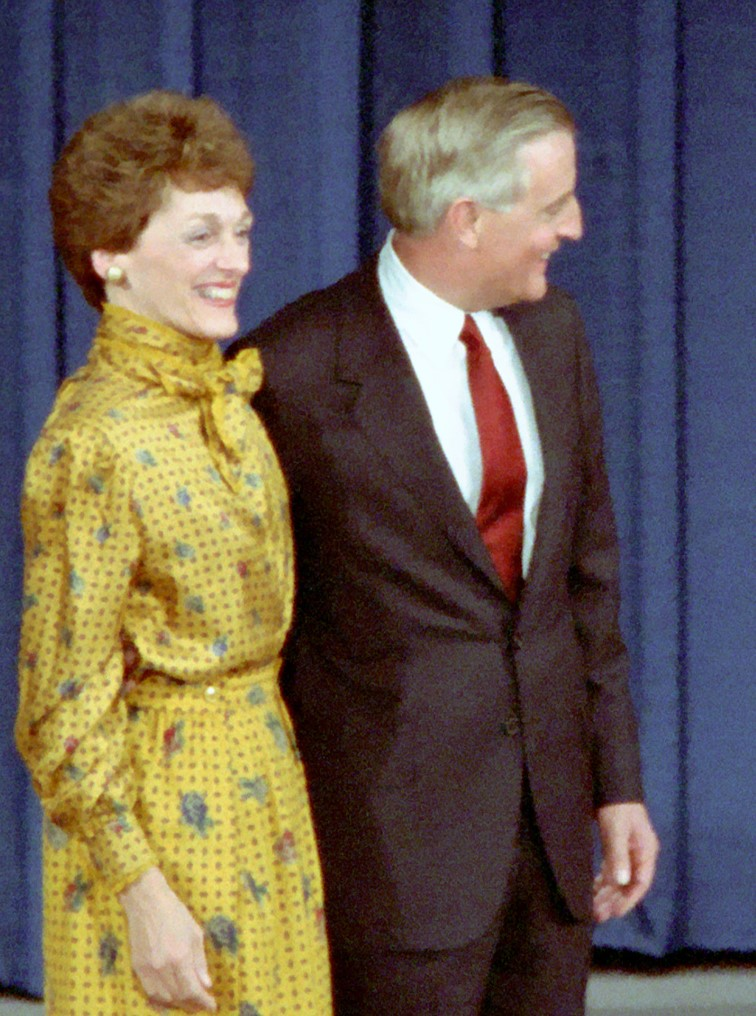
Joan and Walter Mondale in 1984

Mondale's wife, Joan Mondale, was a national advocate for the arts and was the Honorary Chairman of the Federal Council on the Arts and Humanities during the Carter Administration. On February 3, 2014, she died at a hospice in Minneapolis surrounded by family members.

The Mondales' eldest son, Ted, is an entrepreneur and the CEO of Nazca Solutions, a technology fulfillment venture. He is also a former Minnesota state senator. In 1998, Ted Mondale unsuccessfully sought the Democratic nomination for Minnesota governor, running as a fiscal moderate who had distanced himself from labor. The Mondales' daughter, Eleanor, was a television personality. She also had radio talk shows in Chicago and a long-running program on WCCO (AM) in Minneapolis. She died of brain cancer at her home in Minnesota on September 17, 2011, at the age of 51. Their younger son, William Hall Mondale, is a former assistant Attorney General of Minnesota.

Mondale had a residence near Lake of the Isles in Minneapolis. He was a Presbyterian. He enjoyed fishing, reading Shakespeare and historical accounts, barbecuing, skiing, watching Monty Python, and playing tennis. Mondale was the recipient of numerous distinctions. He was inducted into Omicron Delta Kappa as an honoris causa initiate at the University of South Carolina in 1981. Mondale also maintained strong ties to the University of Minnesota Law School. In 2002 the school renamed its building Walter F. Mondale Hall. Mondale contributed cameo appearances to the law school's annual T.O.R.T. ("Theater of the Relatively Talentless") productions and allowed his name to be used as the nickname of the school's hockey team: the "Fighting Mondales".

Mondale had deep connections to his ancestral Norway. Upon entering the Senate in 1964, he took over the seat of vice president Hubert Humphrey, another Norwegian-American. In later years, Mondale served on the executive committee of the Peace Prize Forum, an annual conference co-sponsored by the Norwegian Nobel Institute. On December 5, 2007, Norwegian Minister of Foreign Affairs Jonas Gahr Støre announced that Mondale would be named Honorary Consul-General of Norway, representing the Norwegian state in Minnesota. In 2015, Mondale was awarded the Public Leadership in Neurology Award from the American Academy of Neurology for raising awareness for brain health, having lost both his wife and daughter to brain diseases.

== Death ==
Dear Team,
Well my time has come. I am eager to rejoin Joan and Eleanor. Before I Go I wanted to let you know how much you mean to me. Never has a public servant had a better group of people working at their side!
Together we have accomplished so much and I know you will keep up the good fight.
Joe in the White House certainly helps.
I always knew it would be okay if I arrived some place and was greeted by one of you!
My best to all of you!
Fritz

— Mondale's final message to his staff

Mondale died of natural causes in his sleep at his home in Minneapolis, Minnesota, on April 19, 2021, at the age of 93. At the time of his death, Mondale was the oldest living former U.S. vice president. On the day before his death, he had several phone conversations with Jimmy Carter, Bill Clinton, Joe Biden, Kamala Harris, and Minnesota governor Tim Walz. Mondale also emailed a final message to his staff, as he and his family had come to the conclusion that "his death was imminent".

Carter said in a statement: "Today I mourn the passing of my dear friend Walter Mondale, who I consider the best vice president in our country's history ... Rosalynn and I join all Americans in giving thanks for his exemplary life, and we extend our deepest condolences to his family." Carter had last seen Mondale in person at the Carter Center in June 2019.

President Biden paid tribute to Mondale in a public statement, calling him a "dear friend and mentor" who had "defined the vice presidency as a full partnership, and helped provide a model for my service". On April 20, 2021, Biden ordered all flags at government properties, office buildings and public grounds to be flown at half-staff until that Tuesday evening in honor of Mondale.

External videos
- Walter Mondale Memorial Service, May 1, 2022, C-SPAN

Due to the COVID-19 pandemic, funeral services for Mondale were delayed. Two public services were initially planned for September 2021, one in his home state of Minnesota and the other in Washington D.C.; both were later postponed. A memorial service was later held on May 1, 2022, at Northrop Auditorium on the Minneapolis campus of the University of Minnesota. Attendees included family, friends, state and national leaders, including President Joe Biden.

== Legacy ==
In the "Walter F. Mondale Papers" at the Minnesota Historical Society, digital content is available for research use. Contents include speech files, handwritten notes, memoranda, annotated briefings, schedules, correspondence, and visual materials. The collection includes senatorial, vice presidential, ambassadorial, political papers and campaign files, and personal papers documenting most aspects of Mondale's 60‑year-long career, including all of his public offices, campaigns, and Democratic Party and other non-official activities. The University of Minnesota Law Library's Walter F. Mondale website is devoted to Mondale's senatorial career. Mondale's work is documented in full text access to selected proceedings and debates on the floor of the Senate as recorded in the Congressional Record.

The Joan and Walter Mondale Award for Public Service is named for him and his wife.

== In popular culture ==
In the HBO series Succession, Tom Wambsgans' and Shiv Roy's dog is called "Mondale."

In the 2017 biopic of serial killer Jeffery Dahmer’s adolescence, My Friend Dahmer which was based on the 2012 graphic novel of the same name by John Backderf, Mondale is portrayed by Tom Luce in a scene where the future serial killer portrayed by Ross Lynch unexpectedly meets Mondale on a school field trip to Washington D.C.

== Books ==
- Mondale, Walter F. (1975). The Accountability of Power: Toward a Responsible Presidency. New York: D. McKay Company. ISBN 978-0-679-50558-7. OCLC 924994584.
- Mondale, Walter; Hage, Dave (2010). The Good Fight: A Life in Liberal Politics. New York: Scribner. ISBN 978-0-8166-9166-1. OCLC 965579928. Mondale's memoir.

== General sources ==
- Gillon, Steven M. (1992). The Democrats' Dilemma: Walter F. Mondale and the Liberal Legacy. The Contemporary American History Series. New York: Columbia University Press. ISBN 978-0-231-07630-2. OCLC 463795021.
- Lewis, Finlay (1984). Mondale: Portrait of an American Politician. New York: Perennial Library Books. ISBN 978-0060806972. OCLC 473962348.

Party political offices
Preceded by Miles Lord	DFL nominee for Attorney General of Minnesota; 1962	Succeeded by Wayne H. Olson
Preceded by Hubert Humphrey	Democratic nominee for U.S. Senator from Minnesota (Class 2); 1966, 1972	Succeeded by Wendell Anderson
Preceded by Sargent Shriver	Democratic nominee for Vice President of the United States; 1976, 1980	Succeeded by Geraldine Ferraro
Preceded by Jimmy Carter	Democratic nominee for President of the United States; 1984	Succeeded by Michael Dukakis
Preceded by Paul Wellstone	Democratic nominee for U.S. Senator from Minnesota (Class 2); 2002	Succeeded by Al Franken
Legal offices
Preceded by Miles Lord	Attorney General of Minnesota; 1960–1964	Succeeded by Robert Mattson
U.S. Senate
Preceded by Hubert Humphrey	U.S. Senator (Class 2) from Minnesota; 1964–1976; Served alongside: Eugene McCarthy, Hubert Humphrey	Succeeded by Wendell R. Anderson
Political offices
Preceded by Nelson Rockefeller	Vice President of the United States; 1977–1981	Succeeded by George H. W. Bush
Diplomatic posts
Preceded by Michael Armacost	United States Ambassador to Japan; 1993–1996	Succeeded by Tom Foley
