= John M. Wright =

United States Army general (1916–2014)

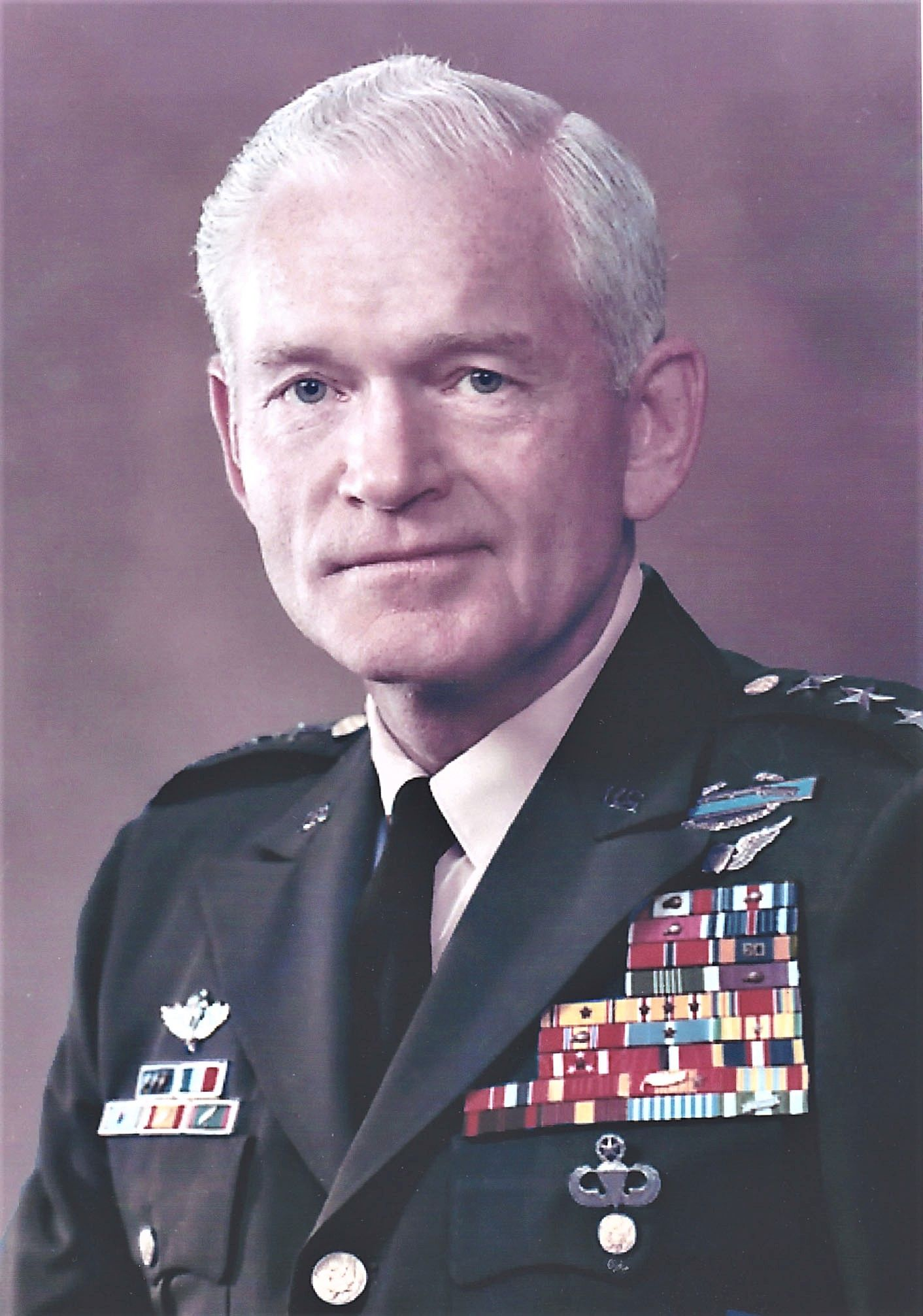
- Born: April 14, 1916; Los Angeles, California, United States
- Died: January 27, 2014 (aged 97); Riverside County, California
- Burial place: Arlington National Cemetery
- Military career
- Allegiance: United States of America
- Branch: United States Army
- Service years: 1940–1972
- Rank: Lieutenant general
- Commands: Comptroller of the Army; 101st Airborne Division
- Conflicts: World War II; Korean War; Vietnam War
- Awards: Distinguished Service Medal (2); Silver Star (2); Legion of Merit (2); Distinguished Flying Cross; Purple Heart (2)

Lieutenant general John MacNair Wright (14 April 1916 – 27 January 2014) was a United States Army officer who served in World War II, the Korean War and the Vietnam War.

== Military career ==
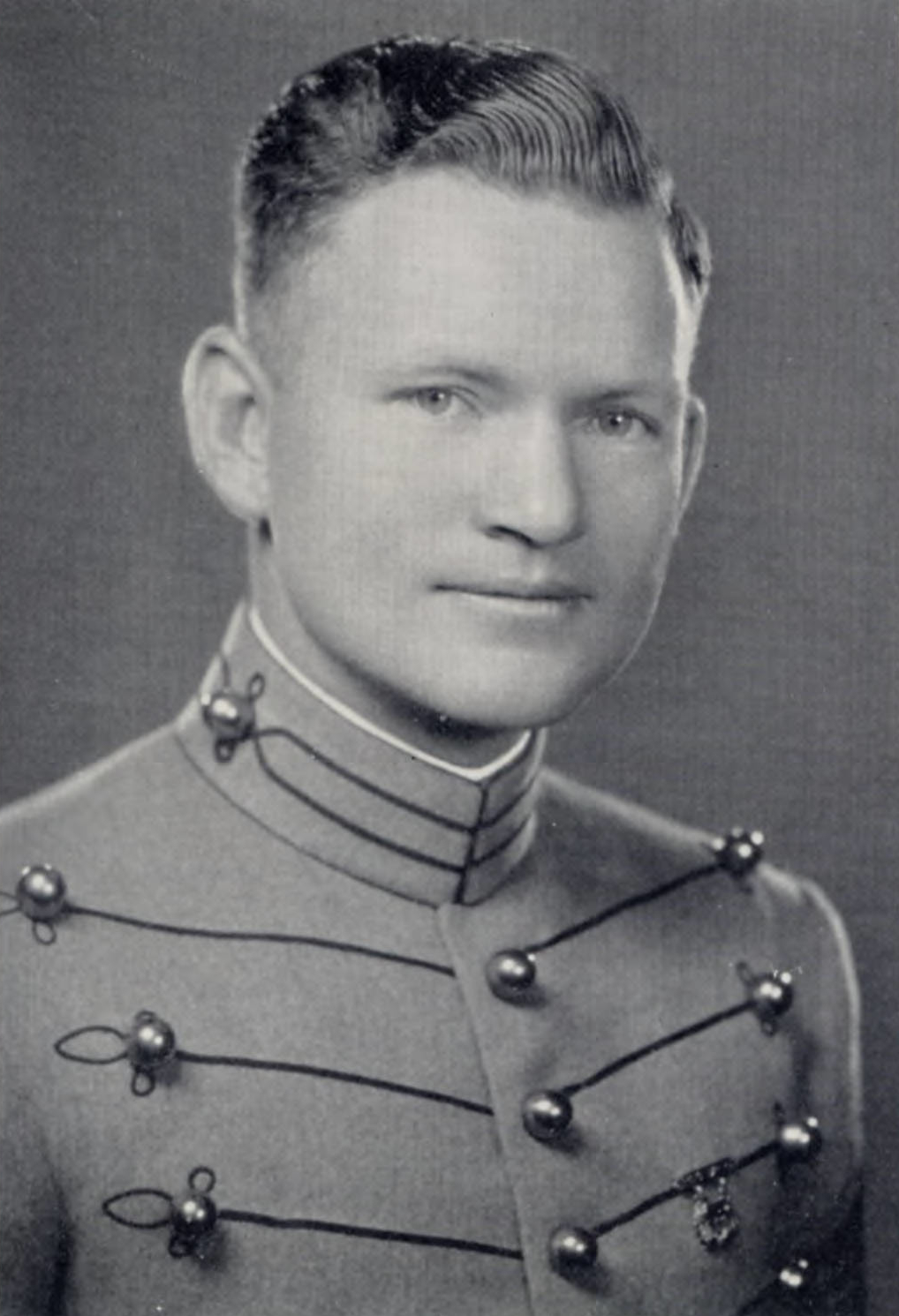
Wright as a West Point cadet in 1940

On graduating from the United States Military Academy (West Point) in 1940 Lieutenant Wright was assigned to the 91st Coast Artillery on Corregidor, Philippines. During World War II he was captured during the Battle of Corregidor and spent 3.5 years as a Japanese prisoner of war. He survived the sinking of the Ōryoku Maru and was freed from captivity in September 1945. He later wrote about his experiences in his book Captured on Corregidor: Diary of an American P.O.W. in World War II.

During the Korean War Lieutenant Colonel Wright served in the 7th Infantry Division.

He was promoted to Brigadier general and served as Assistant Division Commander of the 11th Air Assault Division (Test), which was renamed the 1st Cavalry Division (Airmobile) and deployed to South Vietnam. Arriving in Saigon on 2 August 1965 Wright led the advance party to establish the division in Vietnam.

From July 1967 to May 1969 he served as commander of Fort Benning.

Wright served as commander of the 101st Airborne Division from May 1969 to May 1970. Assuming command of the division at the end of the Battle of Hamburger Hill, Wright created controversy by abandoning the hill on 5 June.

Following his return from Vietnam he was promoted to lieutenant general and appointed Comptroller of the Army, his last active duty assignment before retiring in 1972.

General Wright was an hereditary companion of the Military Order of the Loyal Legion of the United States.
