= 1966 United States Senate election in Minnesota =

- November 8, 1966
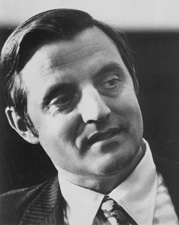

Nominee	Walter Mondale	Robert Forsythe
Party	Democratic (DFL)	Republican
Popular vote	685,840	574,868
Percentage	53.94%	45.21%
- County results Mondale: 40–50% 50–60% 60–70% 70–80% Forsythe: 40–50% 50–60% 60–70%
U.S. senator before election
Walter Mondale
Democratic (DFL)
Elected U.S. Senator
Walter Mondale
Democratic (DFL)

The 1966 United States Senate election in Minnesota took place on November 8, 1966. Incumbent Democratic U.S. Senator Walter Mondale, who had originally been appointed in 1964 to replace Hubert Humphrey after Humphrey was elected Vice President of the United States, defeated Republican challenger Robert A. Forsythe, to win a full term.

== Democratic–Farmer–Labor primary ==
=== Candidates ===
==== Declared ====
- Ralph E. Franklin
- Walter Mondale, Incumbent U.S. Senator since 1964

=== Results ===
Democratic primary election results
Party	Candidate	Votes	%
Democratic (DFL)	Walter Mondale (Incumbent)	410,841	90.97%
Democratic (DFL)	Ralph E. Franklin	40,785	9.03%
Total votes		451,626	100.00%

== Republican primary ==
=== Candidates ===
==== Declared ====
- Robert A. Forsythe, businessman
- Henry A. Johnsen

=== Results ===
Republican primary election results
Party	Candidate	Votes	%
Republican	Robert A. Forsythe	211,282	81.19%
Republican	Henry A. Johnsen	48,941	18.81%
Total votes		260,223	100.00%

== General election ==
=== Results ===
General election results
Party	Candidate	Votes	%
Democratic (DFL)	Walter Mondale (Incumbent)	685,840	53.94%
Republican	Robert A. Forsythe	574,868	45.21%
Socialist Workers	Joseph Johnson	5,487	0.43%
Industrial Government	William Braatz	5,231	0.41%
Total votes		1,271,426	100.00%
Majority		110,972	8.73%
Democratic (DFL) hold			

== See also ==
- United States Senate elections, 1966
