= Ernest D. Peixotto =

United States Army general

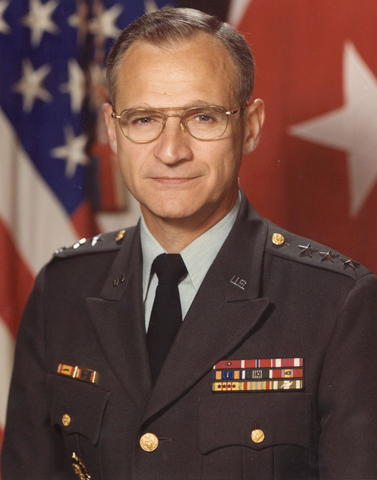
- Born: July 24, 1929 (age 96); Fort Leavenworth, Kansas, US
- Allegiance: United States of America
- Branch: United States Army
- Service years: 1951–1984
- Rank: Lieutenant general
- Commands: Comptroller of the United States Army

Ernest Dishman Peixotto (born July 24, 1929) is a retired United States Army lieutenant general who served as Comptroller of the United States Army from 1981 to 1984. He is a graduate of the United States Military Academy (1951).
