= 1972 United States Senate election in Minnesota =

- November 7, 1972
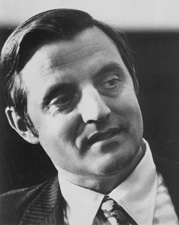

Nominee	Walter Mondale	Phil Hansen
Party	Democratic (DFL)	Republican
Popular vote	981,320	742,121
Percentage	56.67%	42.86%
- County results Mondale: 50–60% 60–70% 70–80% Hansen: 40–50% 50–60% 60–70%
U.S. senator before election
Walter Mondale
Democratic (DFL)
Elected U.S. Senator
Walter Mondale
Democratic (DFL)

The 1972 United States Senate election in Minnesota took place on November 7, 1972. Incumbent Democratic U.S. Senator Walter Mondale won re-election. Minnesota was one of fifteen states, alongside Alabama, Arkansas, Colorado, Delaware, Georgia, Iowa, Louisiana, Maine, Mississippi, Montana, New Hampshire, Rhode Island, South Dakota and West Virginia, that were won by Republican President Richard Nixon in 1972 that elected Democrats to the United States Senate. Four years later, Mondale was elected vice president on the Democratic ticket with former Georgia Governor Jimmy Carter.

== Democratic–Farmer–Labor primary ==
=== Candidates ===
==== Declared ====
- Ralph E. Franklin
- Tom Griffin
- Richard "Dick" Leaf
- Walter Mondale, incumbent U.S. senator since 1964

=== Results ===
Democratic primary election results
Party	Candidate	Votes	%
Democratic (DFL)	Walter Mondale (incumbent)	230,679	89.88%
Democratic (DFL)	Tom Griffin	11,266	4.39%
Democratic (DFL)	Richard "Dick" Leaf	7,750	3.02%
Democratic (DFL)	Ralph E. Franklin	6,946	2.71%
Total votes		256,641	100.00%

== Republican primary ==
=== Candidates ===
==== Declared ====
- Phil Hansen, Lutheran minister

=== Results ===
Republican primary election results
Party	Candidate	Votes	%
Republican	Phil Hansen	165,093	100.00%
Total votes		165,093	100.00%

== General election ==
=== Results ===
General election results
Party	Candidate	Votes	%
Democratic (DFL)	Walter Mondale (incumbent)	981,320	56.67%
Republican	Phil Hansen	742,121	42.86%
Industrial Government	Karl H. Heck	8,192	0.47%
Total votes		1,731,633	100.00%
Majority		239,199	13.81%
Turnout		1,731,633	97.63%
Democratic (DFL) hold			

== See also ==
- 1972 United States Senate elections
