= 674th Airborne Field Artillery Battalion =

The 674th Airborne Field Artillery Battalion (674th AFAB) (also designated the 674th Glider Field Artillery Battalion (GFAB) and the 674th Parachute Field Artillery Battalion (PFAB)) is an inactive airborne field artillery battalion of the United States Army. Active with the 11th Airborne Division and the 187th Regimental Combat Team from 1942–1957, the 674th PFAB saw action in the Pacific Theater during World War II and during the Korean War.

== Lineage and honors ==
=== Lineage ===
- Constituted 12 November 1942 in the Army of the United States as the 674th Glider Field Artillery Battalion
- Assigned 27 November 1942 to the 11th Airborne Division
- Activated 25 February 1943 at Camp Mackall, North Carolina
- Reorganized and redesignated 20 July 1945 as the 674th Parachute Field Artillery Battalion.
- Allotted 15 November 1948 to the Regular Army
- Redesignated 30 June 1949 as the 674th Airborne Field Artillery Battalion
- Relieved 1 February 1951 from the 11th Airborne Division
- Assigned 4 June 1956 to the 101st Airborne Division
- Inactivated 25 April 1957 at Fort Campbell, Kentucky

=== Campaign participation credit ===
- World War II: New Guinea; Leyte; Luzon (with arrowhead)
- Korean War: UN Defensive; UN Offensive (with arrowhead); CCF Intervention; First UN Counteroffensive (with arrowhead); CCF Spring Offensive; Korea, Summer-Fall 1952; Korea, Summer 1953

=== Decorations ===
- Presidential Unit Citation (Army), Streamer embroidered LUZON
- Philippine Presidential Unit Citation, Streamer embroidered 17 OCTOBER 1944 TO 4 JULY 1945

== Heraldry ==
=== Distinctive unit insignia ===
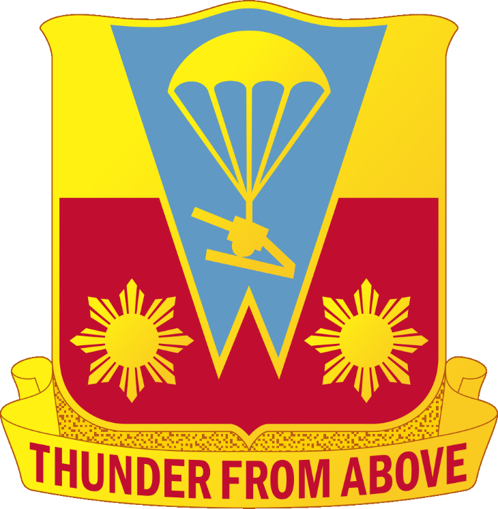

- Description: A Gold color metal and enamel device 1 1/8 inches (2.86 cm) in height overall consisting of a shield blazoned: Per fess enhanced Or and Gules, on a pile of two points Azure (Korean service ribbon Blue) fimbriated at the first between in base two Philippine suns of the like, a howitzer mounted on a heavy drop platform and attached to an open parachute all of the last. Attached below the shield a Gold scroll inscribed "THUNDER FROM ABOVE" in Red letters.
- Symbolism: The colors red and yellow are for Artillery. The two suns, suggested by the Philippine flag, are used in the two decorations awarded the organization for service in the Philippines during World War II. The pile, Korean service ribbon blue, refers to the sky and together with the descending parachute and howitzer, alludes to the nature and airborne classification of the Battalion, which was the first unit to make a heavy drop in combat. The two points symbolize the two parachute jumps the organization made in Korea.
- Background: The distinctive unit insignia was approved on 8 August 1955.

=== Coat of arms ===
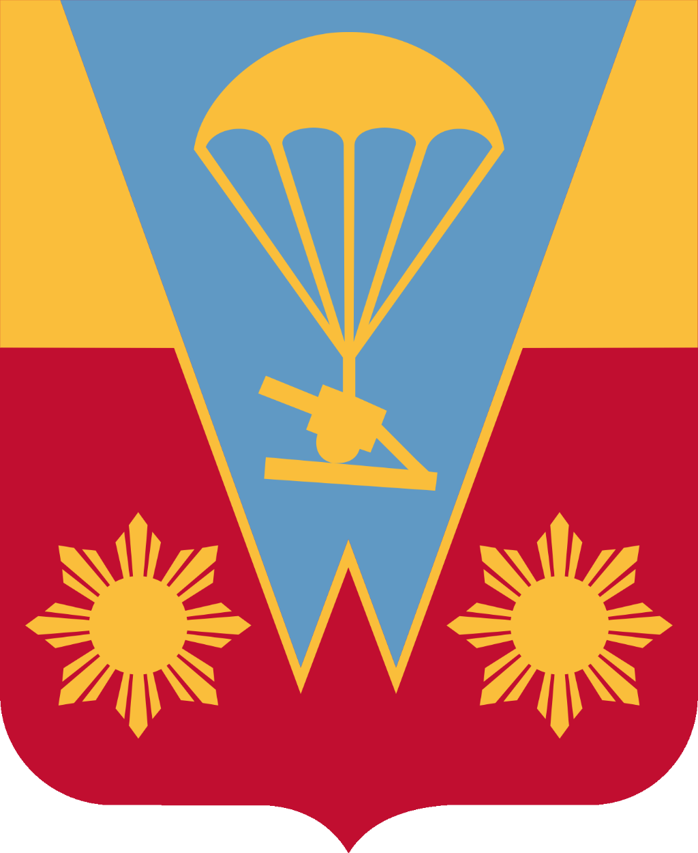

- Description
  - Shield: Per fess enhanced Or and Gules, on a pile of two points Azure (Korean service ribbon Blue) fimbriated at the first between in base two Philippine suns of the like, a howitzer mounted on a heavy drop platform and attached to an open parachute all of the last.
  - Crest: None.
  - Motto: THUNDER FROM ABOVE.
- Symbolism
  - Shield: The colors red and yellow are for Artillery. The two suns, suggested by the Philippine flag, are used in the two decorations awarded the organization for service in the Philippines during World War II. The pile, Korean service ribbon blue, refers to the sky and together with the descending parachute and howitzer, alludes to the nature and airborne classification of the Battalion, which was the first unit to make a heavy drop in combat. The two points symbolize the two parachute jumps the organization made in Korea.
  - Crest: None.
  - Background: The coat of arms was approved on 8 August 1955.

== See also ==
- 11th Airborne Division
- 11th Airborne Division Artillery
- 187th Infantry Regiment
- Korean War Airborne Operations
- Korean War
