= 3rd Armored Division Artillery =

- Shoulder Sleeve Insignia of the 3rd Armored Division
- Active: 1941–1945; 1948–1991
- Country: United States of America
- Branch: United States Army
- Type: Field artillery
- Role: Divisional artillery headquarters
- Part of: 3rd Armored Division
- Garrison/HQ: Hutier Kaserne, Hanau, West Germany (1956–1991)
- Engagements: World War II; Gulf War
- Decorations: Meritorious Unit Commendation (Army)

Commanders
- Notable commanders: John William Vessey Jr.

The 3rd Armored Division Artillery (DIVARTY) was the divisional artillery command for the 3rd Armored Division, last stationed at Hanau before its inactivation in 1991.

Constituted in 1941, the DIVARTY served with the division during World War II and was inactivated after the end of the war along with the division. It was reactivated with the division in 1948, and sent to West Germany with the division in 1956. The DIVARTY served there for rest of the Cold War, then deployed with the division during the Gulf War. After returning to Germany, it was inactivated there in September 1991.

== World War II ==
The 3rd Armored Division Artillery was first constituted on 13 January 1941 in the Regular Army as the Artillery Section of the division headquarters, and activated on 15 April with the division at Camp Beauregard. On 1 March 1942, it was redesignated as the Divisional Artillery Command. After the end of World War II, it was inactivated in Germany on 10 November 1945.

== Cold War ==
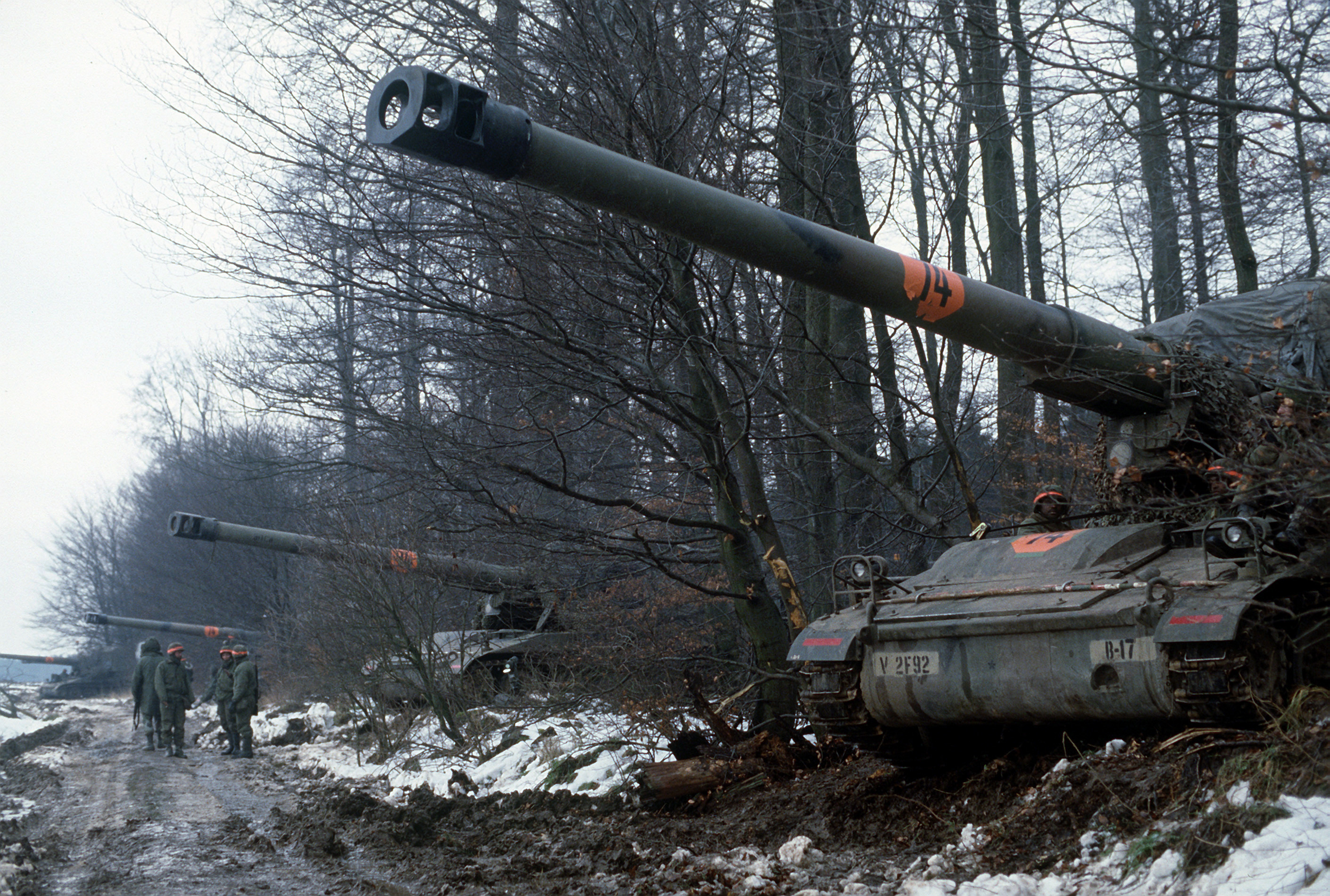
M110A2 203mm self-propelled howitzers of the 1st Battalion, 40th Field Artillery are deployed along a line of trees during Central Guardian, a phase of Exercise REFORGER '85 near Weitershain (Landkreis Gießen).

While inactive, the Divisional Artillery Command was consolidated with the division Service Company (excluding for the Military Police Platoon), and redesignated as the Division Artillery. The Division Artillery headquarters and headquarters battery (HHB) was reactivated with the division at Fort Knox on 30 July 1948. On 1 July 1955, it was redesignated the 3rd Armored Division Artillery. Beginning in 1962, Edward M. Flanagan Jr. commanded the organization, after which he served as secretary of the general staff for United States Army Europe.

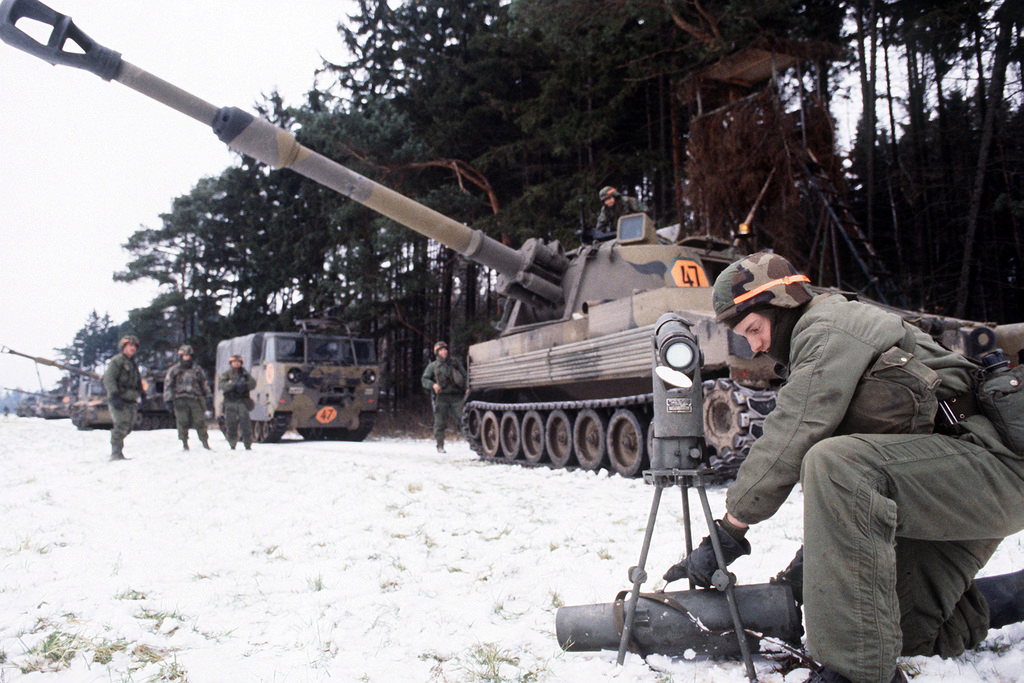
A soldier of the 2nd Battalion, 27th Field Artillery setting up a collimator to sight in a howitzer during Exercise Reforger '85, with an M109A2 self-propelled howitzer in the background

== Gulf War ==
DIVARTY was awarded the Meritorious Unit Commendation for its actions in the war. After returning to Germany, DIVARTY was inactivated there on 16 September 1991.

== Honors ==
=== Campaign streamers ===
The HHB of the 3rd Armored Division Artillery is entitled to the following Campaign streamers:

Conflict	Streamer	Dates of campaign
World War II	Normandy	6 June–24 July 1944
World War II	Northern France	25 July–14 September 1944
World War II	Rhineland	15 September 1944 – 21 March 1945
World War II	Ardennes-Alsace	16 December 1944 – 25 January 1945
World War II	Central Europe	22 March–11 May 1945
Southwest Asia	Defense of Saudi Arabia	2 August 1990–16 January 1991
Southwest Asia	Liberation and Defense of Kuwait	17 January–11 April 1991
Southwest Asia	Cease-Fire	12 April 1991–30 November 1995

=== Decorations ===
The HHB of the 3rd Armored Division Artillery is entitled to the following decorations:

- Meritorious Unit Commendation (Army), Streamer embroidered SOUTHWEST ASIA
- Belgian Fourragere 1940
- Cited in the Order of the Day of the Belgian Army for action in the Ardennes
- Cited in the Order of the Day of the Belgian Army for action in Belgium
