= Consulate General of Sweden, Mumbai =

Diplomatic mission of Sweden in Mumbai

- Location: Mumbai
- Address: 3 Floor, C – 53, TCG Financial Centre; G – Block, BKC, Bandra (E); Mumbai – 400098, Maharashtra, India
- Coordinates: 19.06888°N 72.86906°E
- Opening: 2012 (Note: The current consulate general originated from the honorary consulate that was opened on 6 October 1857. It was upgraded to a career consulate general in 1942, which closed in 1948 and reopened in 2012.)
- Jurisdiction: Maharashtra, Gujarat, Goa, Dadra and Nagar Haveli and Daman and Diu
- Consul General: Sven Östberg
- Website: Official website

The Consulate General of Sweden, Mumbai is the diplomatic mission of Sweden in Mumbai, India. Its focusing on promoting trade and investment, enhancing Sweden's image, and providing consular services to Swedish citizens. Reestablished in 2012, the consulate collaborates with the Swedish embassy in New Delhi, Business Sweden, and the Swedish-Indian Chamber of Commerce to promote strategic industries such as energy, environmental technology, healthcare, and IT. The consular district covered by the consulate includes Maharashtra, Gujarat, Goa, and the union territory of Dadra and Nagar Haveli and Daman and Diu, with a population of approximately 180 million people. The chancery is located in the TCG Financial Centre in the Bandra Kurla Complex, Mumbai's central business district.

The consulate general traces its origins to the Swedish honorary consulate in Bombay, established in 1857 to support trade and shipping within the Bombay Presidency. Throughout the late 19th and early 20th centuries, the consulate was mainly managed by foreign merchants. Starting in 1930, Swedish businessmen in India were appointed as honorary consuls. This changed in 1942 when the career consulate general moved from Calcutta to Bombay, elevating the consulate's status. However, in 1948, the consulate general in Bombay was closed, and its responsibilities were transferred to the newly established legation in New Delhi.

== History ==
=== Background ===
During the early years of the Age of Empire (1870s to mid-1880s), Sweden–Norway sought to expand its influence by increasing its consular presence in territories where major imperial powers were establishing colonial order. Unlike these powers, Sweden–Norway had few diplomatic missions, relying instead on consuls to represent its interests. The primary goal was to gain political prestige and economic benefits by supporting Swedish and Norwegian merchants and shipowners. However, the consular service faced several challenges. Consuls were often appointed based on reputation and connections rather than qualifications, leading to a lack of necessary skills and knowledge about Sweden–Norway's economic interests. Many consuls were Western merchants who also represented multiple countries and were deeply integrated into colonial networks. Despite some successes in social and political integration, the consular service struggled with economic obstacles and ultimately failed to effectively support trade and shipping. Efforts to reform the consular service, including the appointment of a reform committee in 1875, were insufficient, and by the time of the Berlin Conference almost a decade later, significant issues remained unresolved. This lack of a well-thought-out plan led to an inefficient consular service that did not meet its intended economic goals.

=== 1857–1930 ===
A Swedish honorary consulate was established by letters patent on 6 October 1857. The consular district covered the Bombay Presidency. The first Swedish-Norwegian consul in Bombay was Johann Georg Volkart, a Swiss business pioneer who co-founded Volkart Brothers in Winterthur and Bombay in 1851 with his brother Salomon. Salomon initially traveled to India in 1844 to explore sales opportunities for Swiss textile producers, forming connections with European merchants and securing a job for Johann with Huscke, Wattenbach & Co. Johann became head of their Bombay branch but lost his job when the firm dissolved in 1849. This led to the founding of Volkart Brothers on 1 February 1851. With offices in Winterthur and Bombay, Salomon managed the Swiss operations while Johann handled the Indian side. The firm traded in cotton, textiles, European imports, and Indian exports such as fish oil, coir, black pepper, and curry powder. By the late 1850s, it had grown into a medium-sized merchant house with nine European employees in Bombay, Cochin, and Colombo. While Johann's consulship lent prestige, he likely had little knowledge or interest in Swedish and Norwegian affairs.

Volkart's successor, Julius Achenbach, served as the Swedish-Norwegian consul in Bombay from 1863 to 1865. He was also the Austrian consul and part of a network of German merchants who entered British East India as partners of British companies. Many of these German merchants had been naturalized and anglicized their names. Augustus Charles Gumpert, who served as Swedish-Norwegian consul to Bombay twice (from 1866 to 1871 and in 1876–77), and J.H. Riebe (1872–1875), were both German by birth. Gumpert, originally named August Carl, was naturalized in 1853 and served as consul not only for Sweden–Norway but also for Prussia, Oldenburg, Hamburg, Bremen, and later the North German Confederation. Since both he and Riebe were British citizens, their appointments had to be formally approved by Queen Victoria.

The consular activities in Bombay had a modest impact on the commercial success of the Swedish-Norwegian consulate, as shipping and trade remained marginal despite well-established consuls. However, the Consular Committee had some expectations for Bombay, noting an increase in shipping from zero in 1870–1871 to eleven Norwegian and three Swedish ships. In colonized regions, Sweden-Norway's representatives were part of European expansion and were often European rather than specifically Swedish or Norwegian. This is exemplified by a donation from the Swedish-Norwegian consular fund to the European General Hospital in Bombay in 1875. Consul Riebe, a German-born British citizen representing Sweden-Norway, supported the donation because the hospital treated Europeans, including seamen. The Swedish National Board of Trade and the Norwegian Ministry of the Interior (Departementet for det indre) acknowledged the limited Swedish-Norwegian shipping presence but agreed to Riebe's proposal, resulting in a donation of 20 guineas, equivalent to about £2,223 in 2020.

Consul Gumpert of Bombay resigned from his position in March 1877 due to illness and passed the role to J. Brandenburg of Bell Brandenburg. Gumpert praised Brandenburg as a person of esteemed social status, having been appointed to consular positions by both the German and Austrian-Hungarian governments. However, when Gumpert passed away two months later, Brandenburg's application for the position was declined. The consulate general in London communicated to Stockholm that Brandenburg's firm lacked sufficient establishment to warrant his appointment. Despite serving as the acting Swedish-Norwegian consul for eight months, Brandenburg never appeared in any official Swedish-Norwegian publication.

During the late nineteenth century, consular positions gained increasing prestige. Gumpert's second term ended abruptly with his death after only four months. Among the four candidates vying for his position was C.T. Meili, the local manager of Volkart Brothers, who was clearly favored by the Swedish. Despite Meili's good standing confirmed by the Norwegian Ministry of the Interior, Hamilton Maxwell of the Hamburg firm W. Nicol & Co. was appointed at the recommendation of Wilhelm Christopher Christophersen, a prominent consul general in Buenos Aires and later Norwegian foreign minister. Foreign Minister Oscar Björnstjerna concurred with the Norwegian choice, despite Volkart's excellent track record. Despite hopes expressed by the Consular Committee of 1875, Bombay's significance in trade and shipping did not increase in the following years. Maxwell's tenure was short-lived as the collapse of the City of Glasgow Bank in October 1878 led to his resignation after just nine months. Maxwell expressed his hope of recovering and returning to his post in a letter to Stockholm.

In 1881, Maxwell was temporarily replaced by Giuseppe (Joseph) Janni, a representative of Österreichischer Lloyd. Initially, this was supposed to be a temporary arrangement, but Janni was eventually appointed permanently due to Maxwell's continued issues. Despite initial doubts, Janni's appointment brought stability to the consulate, although Bombay's significance did not increase during his tenure. Some authorities questioned Janni's reputation, but he received confirmation of his good standing, particularly from Ole Richter, the Swedish-Norwegian consul general in London. Janni served for another decade, providing stability to the consulate despite Bombay's lack of growth. In 1892, Giuseppe Janni, also the Austrian-Hungarian consul, resigned after 14 years as Swedish-Norwegian consul in Bombay. Three candidates emerged: Gillis Bildt, a member of a prominent Swedish family and agent of the Swedish General Export Association (Sveriges Allmänna Exportförening); Thomas Withey Cuffe, a British banker; and O. von Hoffer, Janni's partner at Österreichischer Lloyd. Von Hoffer initially led in the Norwegian Ministry of the Interior's ranking, but Bildt was favored by Swedish trade committees. Despite Bildt's connections, the Norwegians preferred Cuffe due to concerns over conflicts of interest. Foreign Minister Carl Lewenhaupt accepted Cuffe's appointment, ending the conflict. Cuffe served for four years before Wilhelm Friedrich Bickel, a Swiss citizen, succeeded him in 1898.

During the initial two decades of the Bombay consulate, Sweden-Norway was represented by partners of Volkart Brothers, except for Bildt's application. Typically, only foreign applicants were considered. Despite growing criticism of foreign merchant consuls, there was no concerted effort by the Swedish-Norwegian government to replace them with their citizens. Even when qualified native candidates like Bildt emerged, consensus couldn't be reached. Thus, the consulate in Bombay remained under Volkart representatives. In 1908, Hermann Uehlinger briefly served before being replaced by Lucas Volkart, continuing the longstanding partnership between Swedes and the Swiss merchants of Volkart Brothers.

In the 1918 investigation regarding Sweden's representation abroad, a reorganization of consular services in British India, including Bombay, was proposed. The General Export Association suggested that a salaried consulate be established in Bombay and that a roving commercial attaché be employed at the consulate general in Calcutta. However, the committee determined that it was not possible to immediately implement all the proposed measures due to budget constraints and the need to balance resources across different locations. Despite this, they acknowledged the importance of Bombay as a growing port city, especially for the export of cotton and opium, thanks to its strategic location near the Suez Canal. The General Export Association further emphasized that Swedish interests in Bombay were significant and that the city, along with other key ports like Calcutta, should have strong Swedish representation to promote trade relations.

=== 1930–2012 ===
From 1930 onwards, Swedish businessmen based in India were appointed as honorary consuls. The first was Alvar Möller, who represented Svenska Tändsticks AB (STAB), later known as Swedish Match, in India. He was succeeded in 1932 by Sten Sundgren, who also worked for the same Swedish match company in India. He remained a Swedish honorary consul until 1946. In 1942, the honorary consulate in Bombay became a career consulate general following the transfer of the career consulate general in Calcutta to Bombay, where Consul General Constans Lundquist arrived on 8 June. Two years later, he was succeeded by Magnus Hallenborg. During Hallenborg's tenure as Consul General in the Bombay Presidency, he was also responsible for Romanian, Japanese, Finnish, and Hungarian interests.

In the Swedish government bill of 1948, it was suggested that the position of consul general in Bombay be moved to Antwerp, Netherlands. This change was to occur in conjunction with the establishment of a new legation in New Delhi. In July 1948, the King in Council decided to close the career consulate general in Bombay. At the turn of 1948/49, Sweden's newly established legation in New Delhi commenced its operations. The responsibilities previously held by the closed consulate general in Bombay were thus taken over by the legation.

In 1946, Bertil Thorstenson assumed the role of honorary consul after Sundgren. Sundgren was the head of STAB's enterprises in India, Pakistan, Burma, and Ceylon from 1932 and the Danish consul in Bombay from 1933 to 1947. He was appointed Swedish honorary consul general in 1949. He was succeeded by Tomas Heribert Rydin from 1952 to 1956, who in turn was succeeded by another STAB employee, Sven Göthberg, who served as consul general from 1956 to 1966. In 1966, the head of STAB's Indian subsidiary, Jan-Olof Guthe, was appointed as the new consul general. He left the position three years later.

From 1970 onwards, Indian businessmen served as honorary consuls general of Sweden in Bombay. The first among them was Akbar Hydari, son of the civil servant and politician Muhammad Saleh Akbar Hydari. Hydari was the chairman of the Western India Match Company (WIMCO) Ltd., a subsidiary of Swedish Match. Hydari served until 1990. Between 2001 and 2007, K. C. Mehra served as the honorary consul general. He was the chairman of the Swedish company SKF's subsidiary in India, SKF Bearings India Ltd.

=== 2012–present ===
Through an agreement in 2011 between the Swedish Social Democratic Party and the Reinfeldt cabinet, it was decided that a consulate general would be opened in Mumbai. In 2012, a new consulate general was opened in Mumbai, focusing on trade promotion.

== Tasks ==
=== 19th and early 20th centuries ===
The Swedish–Norwegian consulate in Bombay primarily aimed to support trade and shipping, promoting the interests of Swedish and Norwegian merchants and shipowners. By establishing a consular presence, Sweden–Norway sought to gain political prestige and integrate into colonial networks, emulating the practices of larger imperial powers. The consuls, often Western merchants with connections in the colonial system, represented Sweden–Norway in these broader networks. The consulate engaged in activities such as facilitating imports of European products to India and exports of Indian commodities like cotton, fish oil, and spices to Europe. They also participated in social and political activities, exemplified by donations to local institutions like the European General Hospital in Bombay. Despite these efforts, the consular service faced significant economic challenges, and its impact on Swedish-Norwegian shipping and trade remained limited.

Consular appointments were complex and involved recommendations from various authorities. Consuls were often chosen based on reputation and connections rather than their specific knowledge of Sweden–Norway's interests. The consulate aimed to maintain stability, ensuring a seamless transition when consuls resigned or passed away. The consular service struggled to effectively support trade and achieve its economic goals, reflecting the broader challenges faced by Sweden–Norway in establishing a significant presence in the global colonial order. Despite some successes in social and political integration, the overall impact on trade and shipping was modest. The consulate in Bombay remained largely in the hands of foreign merchants, particularly those from the Swiss firm Volkart Brothers, throughout this period.

=== 2012–present ===
The consulate general focuses on promoting trade and investment as well as enhancing the image of Sweden. This involves supporting trade and investments, contributing to an updated perception of Sweden, and fostering exchanges between Sweden and India. Another important task is to provide consular services to Swedish citizens, including those on temporary visits.

The consulate general collaborates with the Swedish embassy in New Delhi, Business Sweden, and the Swedish-Indian Chamber of Commerce under the framework of Team Sweden. Together, they work to create connections and promote collaborations within various strategic industries, with particular emphasis on energy and environmental technology, healthcare, and IT. The consulate general also disseminates information on how Swedish innovation, technology, and services can benefit India.

== District ==
When the consulate was established in 1857, the consular district included the Bombay Presidency. In 1942, the career consulate general moved from Calcutta to Bombay. From at least 1944 to 1947, the district included the British Raj, British Burma, and British Ceylon.

Since the consulate general was reestablished in 2012, the district has consisted of the states of Maharashtra, Gujarat, Goa and the union territory of Dadra and Nagar Haveli and Daman and Diu. This area has a population of approximately 180 million people.

== Buildings ==
=== Chancery ===
From 1945 to 1947, the chancery was located at the address »Shangri La», Flat No. 1 on 26 Carmichael Road (today called Mahadev Laxman Dahanukar Marg) in South Mumbai. This address was later used as an embassy office in Bombay from at least 1964 to 1967, where a salaried vice-consul served.

From 1948 to at least 1959, the honorary consulate was located in the Indian Mercantile Chambers on Nicol Road in Ballard Estate, which is situated in the financial district of Fort in South Mumbai.

Today's chancery is located in the TCG Financial Centre in the Bandra Kurla Complex, the central business district of Mumbai.

== Heads of Mission ==
Name	Period	Title	Notes	Ref
Bombay (–1995)
J. G. Volkart	7 September 1858 – 29 May 1861	Honorary consul	Died in office.	
Julius Achenbach	17 February 1863 – 12 December 1865	Honorary consul		
Augustus Charles Gumpert	20 November 1866 – 5 October 1871	Honorary consul		
J. H. Riebe	12 April 1872 – 29 August 1875	Honorary consul	Died in office.	
Augustus Charles Gumpert	24 November 1876 – March 1877	Honorary consul	Died in office.	
J. Brandenburg	1877–1878	Acting honorary consul		
Hamilton Maxwell	7 January 1878 – 1 November 1878	Honorary consul		
Giuseppe Janni	10 October 1878 – ?	Acting honorary consul		
Giuseppe Janni	6 August 1881 – 2 December 1892	Honorary consul		
Thomas Withey Cuffe	30 March 1894 – 29 April 1898	Honorary consul		
Wilhelm Friedrich Bickel	30 December 1898 – 20 July 1908	Honorary consul		
Hermann Uehlinger	6 November 1908 – 22 July 1910	Honorary consul		
Lucas Volkart	31 August 1910 – 1920	Honorary consul		
Julius Mueller	1920–1925	Honorary consul		
Giacomo Zino Meli	1925–1929	Honorary consul		
–	1929–1930	Honorary consul	Vacant.	
Alvar Möller	1930–1932	Honorary consul		
Sten Sundgren	1932–1946	Honorary consul		
Constans Lundquist	8 June 1942 – 1944	Consul general	The Consulate General moved from Calcutta to Bombay.	
Magnus Hallenborg	1944–1948	Consul general	With jurisdiction also in the Island of Ceylon.	
Bertil Thorstenson	1949–1952	Honorary consul general	Honorary consul 1946–49.	
Tomas Heribert Rydin	1952–1956	Honorary consul general		
Sven Göthberg	1956–1966	Honorary consul general		
Jan-Olof Guthe	1966–1969	Honorary consul general		
Akbar Hydari	1970–1990	Honorary consul general		
Fredie Mehta	1990–1995	Honorary consul general		
Mumbai (1995–present)
Fredie Mehta	1995–2001	Honorary consul general		
K. C. Mehra	2001–2007	Honorary consul general		
Rakesh Makhija	2008–????	Honorary consul general		
Fredrika Ornbrant	2012–2016	Consul general		
Ulrika Sundberg	2016–2019	Consul general		
Anna Lekvall	2019–2023	Consul general		
Sven Östberg	2023–present	Consul general		

== See also ==
- Embassy of Sweden, New Delhi
