= Carlo von Dardel =

Swedish diplomat (1880–1955)

- Born: Carl Otto David von Dardel; 26 October 1880; Önnestad, Sweden
- Died: 29 November 1955 (aged 75); Falun, Sweden
- Education: Uppsala University
- Occupation: Diplomat
- Years active: 1907–1945
- Spouse: Elsa Carin Maria Åhman (m. 1912)
- Children: 2
- Relatives: Fritz von Dardel (grandfather)

Carl "Carlo" Otto David von Dardel (26 October 1880 – 29 November 1955) was a Swedish diplomat. After completing legal studies at Uppsala University, he entered the Swedish diplomatic service in 1907 as an attaché in Vienna, later serving in Brussels, Narvik, Bern, London, Montreal, and Chicago. In Brussels, he represented Sweden at international conferences in 1909 and 1910. von Dardel was appointed consul general in Batavia (1930–1933), where he promoted Swedish governmental and commercial interests in the Dutch East Indies, and later served as consul general in Sydney (1933–1945), with jurisdiction over the Fiji Islands, until his retirement.

== Early life ==
Carl von Dardel was born into the noble von Dardel family on 26 October 1880 at Fridhem, in Önnestads socken, Kristianstad County, Sweden. He was the son of Consul General Carl Alexander von Dardel (1848–1916) and his wife and cousin, Ebba-Louise de Dardel (1853–1935). He grew up with three sisters—one elder and two younger.

He came from a prominent family with deep roots in Swedish public life. His paternal grandfather was the diarist, illustrator, and pioneering comics artist Fritz von Dardel (1817–1901). His uncles included the court chamberlain Georges Albert von Dardel (1850–1933) and Colonel Hans von Dardel (1857–1932). His cousin was ambassador Gustaf von Dardel (1882–1974). Through his youngest sister, Brita, he was also the brother-in-law of the member of parliament Baron Arvid De Geer (1884–1970).

von Dardel completed his secondary education in 1901 before enrolling at Uppsala University. He passed his preliminary law examination (juridisk preliminärexamen) on 14 December 1903 and earned his civil service degree in law (hovrättsexamen) on 30 May 1907.

== Career ==
von Dardel began his diplomatic career when he was appointed attaché in Vienna on 7 August 1907, before being transferred to Brussels in the same capacity on 7 October 1908. While stationed in Brussels, he represented Sweden as a delegate to the 1909 Conference on the Importation of Arms into Africa and the 1910 World Congress of International Associations.

On 30 December 1910, von Dardel was appointed second secretary at the Swedish Ministry for Foreign Affairs, marking the beginning of a succession of increasingly senior diplomatic postings. He served as acting consul in Narvik from 11 April 1913 and became vice consul there on 31 December 1913. During the First World War, he was appointed acting legation secretary in Bern on 17 August 1915, followed by the same position in London on 19 May 1917. He was subsequently named acting consul general in Montreal on 30 August 1918, and consul in Chicago on 17 June 1921.

As Swedish consul in Chicago, von Dardel viewed his role as extending beyond traditional consular duties. He became an important cultural bridge between Sweden and the hundreds of thousands of Swedish Americans living in the American Midwest. In close cooperation with the Augustana Synod, he promoted exchanges of clergy and established scholarship programs designed to strengthen connections with Sweden and foster greater awareness of modern Swedish society among the emigrant community.

From 1930 to 1933, von Dardel served as consul general in Batavia, the capital of the Dutch East Indies. As head of the Swedish consulate general, he represented both the Swedish state and Swedish commercial interests throughout the region. His responsibilities included promoting Swedish exports, monitoring economic developments, and supporting Swedish companies active in the Javanese market, including AB Separator, ASEA, LM Ericsson, SKF, and Svenska Tändsticks AB.

On 7 July 1933, the Foreign Office approved his appointment as consul general in Sydney, with jurisdiction over the Fiji Islands. He remained in Sydney until 1945 when he retired.

== Personal life ==
On 8 July 1912, von Dardel married Elsa Carin Maria Åhman (1883–1965) in Östhammar Church. She was the daughter of Isidor Anton Ferdinand Åhman, a regimental physician and Licentiate of Medicine, and Agnes Christina Maria Broström.

The couple had two daughters: Alexandra Ebba Augusta Madeleine, born in Narvik on 8 July 1913, and Ebba Carola Helene, born in London on 21 August 1917. Their elder daughter, Alexandra, later married Colonel Jan von Horn (1907–1987).

== Death ==
von Dardel died on 29 November 1955 at Falun Hospital in Falun, Sweden. A memorial service was held at Leksand Chapel in Leksand on 4 December 1955, after which he was interred at Leksand Cemetery.

== Awards and decorations ==
=== Swedish ===
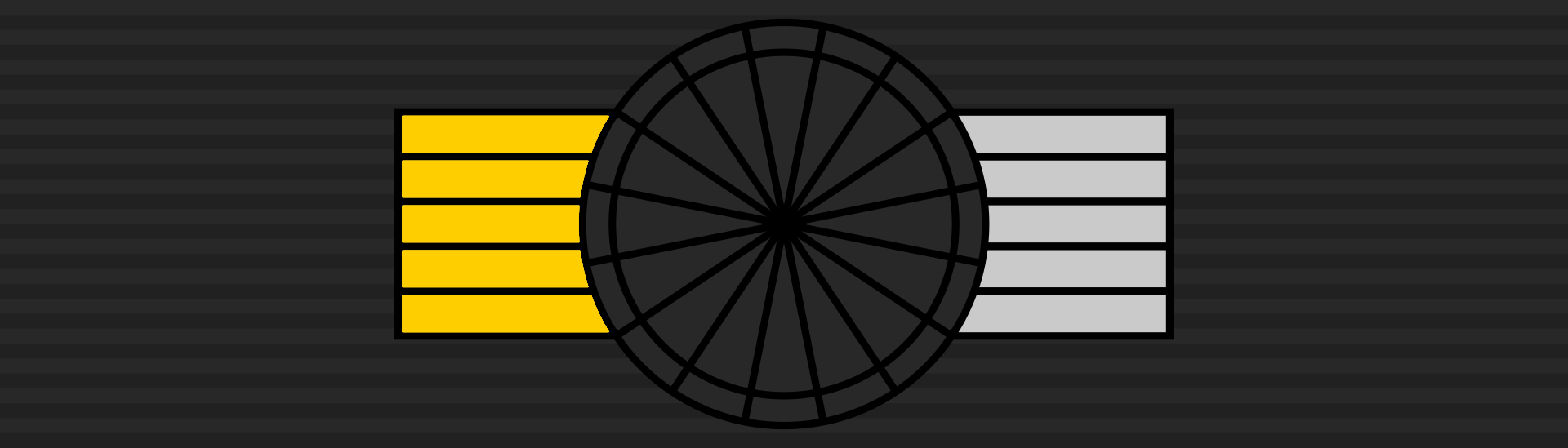
- (Sweden) Commander 1st Class of the Order of the Polar Star (6 June 1942)
- (Sweden) Commander of the Order of the Polar Star (6 June 1935)
- (Sweden) Knight of the Order of the Polar Star (1931)
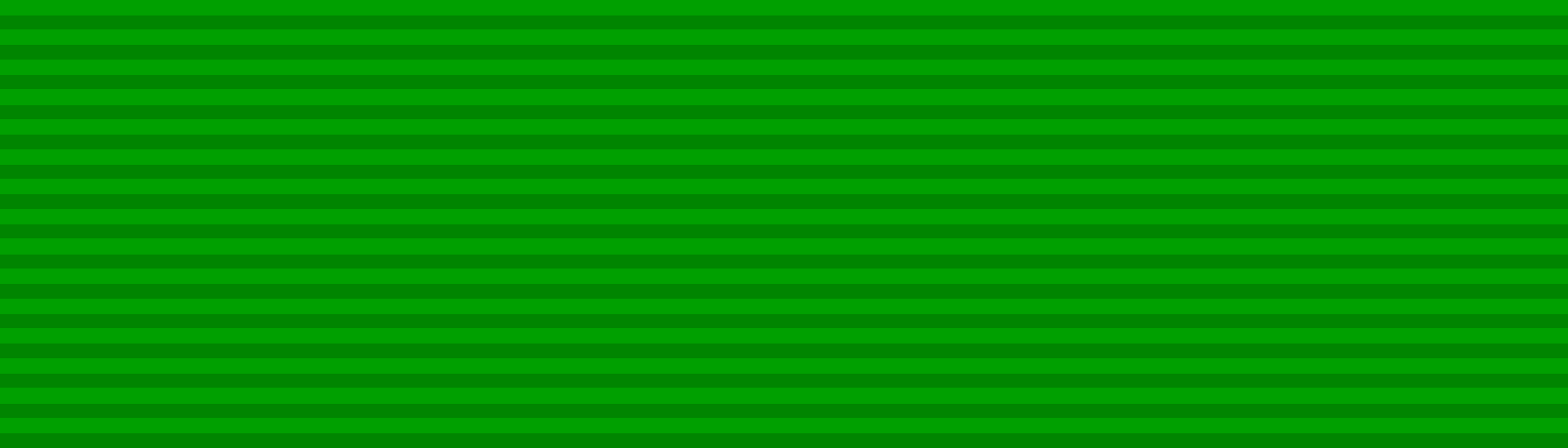
- (Sweden) Knight of the Order of Vasa (6 June 1921)

=== Foreign ===
- (Kingdom of Serbia) Officer of the Order of St. Sava (1908)
- (Belgium) Knight of the Order of the Crown (1910)
- (Empire of Japan) 3rd Class of the Order of the Sacred Treasure
- (Empire of Japan) 4th Class of the Order of the Sacred Treasure (1913)
- (Austria-Hungary) Officer's Cross of the Decoration for Services to the Red Cross
- (Tsardom of Bulgaria (1908–1946)) Commander of the Order of Civil Merit (1924)
- 2nd Class of the Order of Merit of the Kingdom of Hungary

Diplomatic posts
Preceded by David Bergström	Acting Consul General of Sweden to Montreal; 1918–1921	Succeeded by Magnus Clarholm
Preceded by Sigurd Theodor Goës	Consul of Sweden to Chicago; 1921–1929	Succeeded by Constans Lundquist
Preceded by Thore Fevrell	Consul General of Sweden to Batavia; 1930–1933	Succeeded by George Jean Marie Wehry as Honorary Consul General
Preceded by Einar Lindquist	Consul General of Sweden to Sydney; 1933–1945	Succeeded by Constans Lundquist
