= 1890 Minnesota Secretary of State election =

- November 4, 1890
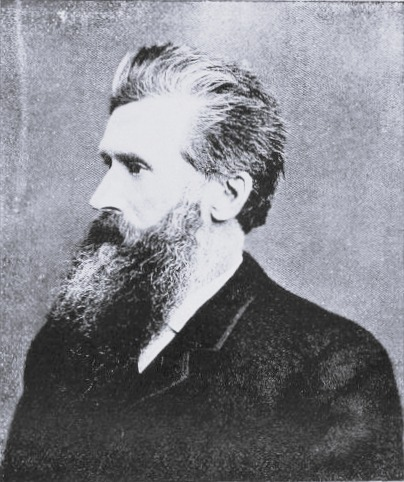

Nominee	Frederick P. Brown	Axel T. Lindholm	Michael F. Wesenberg
Party	Republican	Democratic	Alliance
Popular vote	96,163	87,816	45,100
Percentage	40.33%	36.83%	18.92%
Secretary of State before election
Hans Mattson
Republican
Elected Secretary of State
Frederick P. Brown
Republican

The 1890 Minnesota Secretary of State election was held on November 4, 1890, in order to elect the Secretary of State of Minnesota. Republican nominee Frederick P. Brown defeated Democratic nominee Axel T. Lindholm, Farmers' Alliance nominee Michael F. Wesenberg and Prohibition nominee Hans S. Hilleboe.

== General election ==
On election day, November 4, 1890, Republican nominee Frederick P. Brown won the election by a margin of 8,347 votes against his foremost opponent Democratic nominee Axel T. Lindholm, thereby retaining Republican control over the office of Secretary of State. Brown was sworn in as the 10th Minnesota Secretary of State on January 9, 1891.

=== Results ===
Minnesota Secretary of State election, 1890
Party	Candidate	Votes	%
Republican	Frederick P. Brown	96,163	40.33
Democratic	Axel T. Lindholm	87,816	36.83
Alliance	Michael F. Wesenberg	45,100	18.92
Prohibition	Hans S. Hilleboe	9,352	3.92
Total votes		238,431	100.00
Republican hold			
