= Helena Larsdotter Westerlund =

Swedish educator

Helena Larsdotter Westerlund (April 24, 1799 — November 22, 1865), was a Swedish educator. She was the first woman in Sweden to have been a formally trained and licensed elementary school teacher, when given special dispensation to study and graduate from the teachers' seminary in Gothenburg (Folkskoleseminariet i Göteborg) in 1846.

== Biography ==
She was from Svenljunga parish in Västra Götaland, Sweden. Originally a teacher of a village school, she was one of many women school teachers to be inducted in the new compulsory elementary school system when it was introduced in Sweden in 1842. The previous village schools, which was not subjected to government regulation, was dominated by women teachers, but when the compulsory education system was introduced by the state, the new regulation demanded formally educated teachers, which was not possible for women as no state schools where open to them. As there was a lack of educated male school teachers because of the great female domination in this field, the former women teachers where often allowed to stay on, officially only as temporary stand in-teachers.

Westerlund was the first woman to be granted dispensation to study and graduate from a state teacher's college; she was granted her teacher's licence after only one months' study period (1846), which appears to have been but a formality, and continued to be the first woman formally employed as a teacher in the state education system as well as the first one granted a teacher's pension from the state when she retired in 1861. She was active in Kalv parish in Västergötland. In 1859, women where formally allowed to teach in the compulsory education system. When she retired, she was the first woman granted a state pension as a teacher. She retired to the home of her niece at Håckvik parish in Svenljunga.

== See also ==
- Anna Åfelt
