= Hans Mattson =

American politician

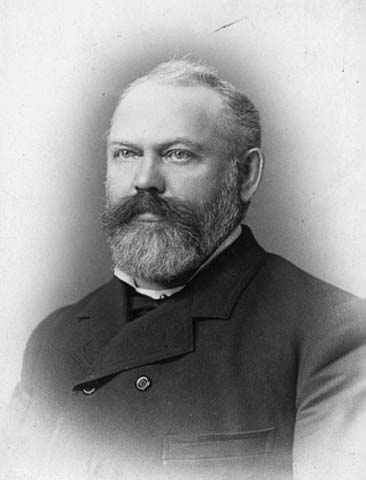
- Mattson c.1885

5th Minnesota Secretary of State
- In office 1870–1872
- Preceded by: Henry C. Rogers
- Succeeded by: Samuel P. Jennison

9th Minnesota Secretary of State
- In office 1887 - 1891
- Preceded by: Frederick Von Baumbach
- Succeeded by: Frederick P. Brown

Personal details
- Born: December 23, 1832 Önnestad, Scania; Kingdom of Sweden and Norway
- Died: March 5, 1893 (aged 60) Minneapolis, Minnesota, U.S.
- Resting place: Lakewood Cemetery, Minneapolis, Minnesota, U.S.

Military service
- Allegiance: United States of America
- Branch/service: Union Army
- Years of service: 1861-1865
- Rank: Colonel
- Unit: Company D, 3rd Minnesota Infantry Regiment
- Commands: 3rd Minnesota Infantry Regiment
- Battles/wars: American Civil War

Hans Mattson (December 23, 1832, Önnestad – March 5, 1893) was a Swedish American politician. He served with distinction as a colonel in the American Civil War (1861–65) and in 1869 became the Minnesota Secretary of State. He later served as United States Consul General in India.

== Early life ==
Mattson was born on a small farm in the parish of Önnestad in Skåne, Sweden. In 1851, he immigrated to the U.S. with a friend. He settled on a farm in an established Swedish community in Illinois in 1853 and brought his family from Sweden to join him. In August 1853, Mattson led a group of several hundred Swedish immigrants to settle in Goodhue County, Minnesota. The settlement was soon known as Vasa, and it became home to prominent Swedish Americans including Governor John Lind. Mattson left in 1856 for Red Wing.

== Civil War ==
Shortly after moving to Red Wing, Mattson was financially ruined by the panic of 1857. He and his wife, Christin (Peterson) Mattson (1837–1911) had to start over. After getting on his feet again, Mattson was admitted to the Minnesota State Bar and entered public life. He was elected city clerk of Red Wing in 1859 before becoming Goodhue County auditor.

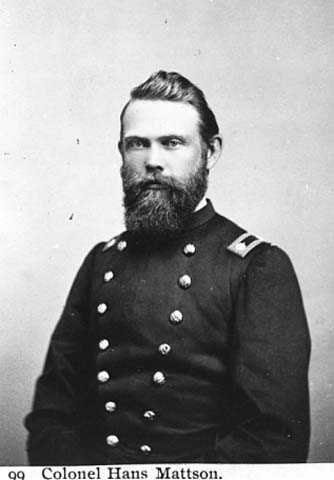
Colonel Hans Mattson c. 1864 by Joel Emmons Whitney

At the start of the American Civil War in 1861, Mattson raised a company of Swedish and Norwegian immigrants to fight for the Union. Mattson earned the rank of Colonel for his leadership of the 3rd Minnesota Volunteer Infantry Regiment. He returned to Red Wing at the end of the war in 1865.

== Immigration booster ==
After returning to Minnesota, Mattson began his work as an immigration booster. First, he worked for private railroad companies. He started with the Saint Paul and Pacific Railroad, where he worked as a protection agent to greet Swedish and Norwegian arrivals in Chicago.

Building on his experience, in 1866, Mattson proposed the creation of a state Board of Immigration. The board would recruit immigrants to homestead land in Minnesota. Until the 1880s, immigration to the U.S. was regulated by states rather than the federal government. In 1867, Governor William Rainey Marshall established the board and named Mattson to be its first secretary. The state was especially interested in recruiting Scandinavian immigrants.

Mattson returned to Sweden as representative of the Minnesota Immigration Board in 1867 and 1868 to recruit settlers, a successful undertaking. He returned again several times in the 1870s as an immigrant agent for the Northern Pacific Railroad. These visits are described in his memoirs Reminiscences: the story of an immigrant, which were published in both English and Swedish in 1891.

As a booster, Mattson promoted Minnesota in Sweden and Norway. He also promoted the state to Scandinavian immigrant communities in the Eastern U.S. Mattson recruited immigrants to Minnesota by several means. He wrote for Swedish American newspapers; he encouraged immigrants to write letters to friends and family in Europe, and he published pamphlets about the benefits of Minnesota. During the course of his life, Mattson founded several Swedish newspapers in Chicago and Minneapolis, including the Minnesota Stats Tidning.

== Politician ==
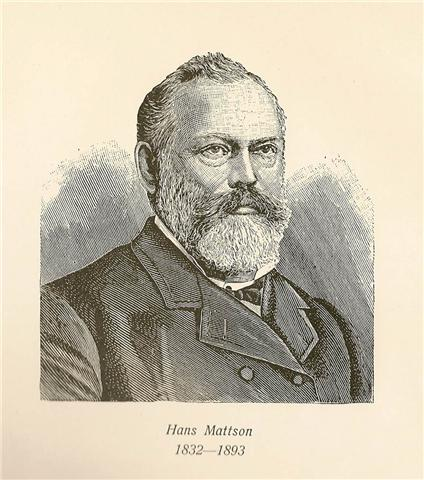
Hans Mattson c.1880's

In 1870, Mattson was asked to run for Minnesota Secretary of State. Scandinavian influence in Minnesota was growing, and the Republican Party sought Swedish and Norwegian immigrants as candidates for office. Mattson was elected, becoming the first Swedish American elected to office in Minnesota. Mattson left the position in 1872, but he was re-elected and served again from 1887 to 1891. As a politician, Mattson promoted pan-Scandinavian unity, even though Swedish and Norwegian immigrants often were at odds.

In between his stints as Secretary of State, Mattson lived outside the U.S. He took his family to Sweden in the spring of 1871. He remained in Sweden for five years as a booster. From 1881 to 1883, Mattson served as U.S. Consul General in India. President James A. Garfield offered him a diplomatic post because Mattson had become one of the most prominent Swedish Americans in U.S. politics. Aside from these trips abroad, Mattson lived most of his later life in Minneapolis where he died in 1893.

== Electoral history ==
=== 1886 ===
1886 Minnesota Secretary of State election
Party	Candidate	Votes	%
Republican	Hans Mattson	113,744	52.18
Democratic	Luther (Luth) Jaeger	95,200	43.67
Prohibition	C.A. Bierce	8,991	4.12
Write-in		58	0.03
Total votes		217,993	100.00
Republican hold			

=== 1888 ===
1888 Minnesota Secretary of State election
Party	Candidate	Votes	%
Republican	Hans Mattson (incumbent)	141,373	53.90
Democratic	William Bredenhagen	104,806	39.96
Prohibition	Peter Thompson	15,475	5.90
Union Labor	John P. (J.P.) Schoenbeck	466	0.18
Write-in		162	0.06
Total votes		262,282	100.00
Republican hold			

== Note ==
- This Wikipedia article is substantially built upon the essay "Mattson, Hans (1832–1893)" in MNopedia of the Minnesota Historical Society.
  Written by R.L. Cartwright, 2012 and licensed under CC by-sa. Imported on 3 November 2012.

== Other sources ==
- Jaeger, Luth (1910) "Hans Mattson" in A History of the Swedish-Americans of Minnesota. Vol. 1 (Algot E. Strand, ed., Chicago: Lewis Pub. Co.)
- Ljungmark, Lars (1979) Swedish Exodus (Translated by Kermit B. Westerberg. Carbondale: Southern Illinois University Press)

== Related reading ==
- Atkins, Annette (2007) Creating Minnesota: A History from the Inside Out (St. Paul: Minnesota Historical Society Press) ISBN 978-0873516334
- Barton, H. Arnold (1994) A Folk Divided: Homeland Swedes and Swedish Americans, 1840—1940 (pp. 59–62. Southern Illinois University Press) ISBN 978-0809319442
- Blegen, Theodore C. (1963) Minnesota, A History of the State (Minneapolis: University of Minnesota Press)
- Burnquist, Joseph A.A., ed. (1924) Minnesota and Its People (Chicago: S. J. Clarke Publishing Company)

Political offices
Preceded by Henry C. Brown	Secretary of State of Minnesota; 1870–1872	Succeeded by Samuel P. Jennison
Preceded by Frederick Von Baumbach	Secretary of State of Minnesota; 1887–1891	Succeeded by Frederick P. Brown
