= Anna Åfelt =

Swedish teacher

Anna Åfelt (1817—1884) was a Swedish school teacher. She was one of the pioneers of elementary public schooling in Sweden. She was one of the first Swedish women to become a qualified public school teacher, and was later employed as a regular full-time teacher.

== Life ==
Anna Åfelt was born on 16 January 1817, in Vinslöv, Scania, Sweden, to a 22-year-old single mother, Benita Svensdotter. Being the child of an unmarried mother in the 19th century put them both in a precautious situation legally and socially.

From 1837 she was active in Önnestad, training to become a teacher. When the state elementary public schooling was introduced in 1842, all of its teachers were required to have a teaching degree. She applied for a dispensation, and in 1847 was the first woman to gain a primary school teaching degree in Lund. She retired from teaching in 1874.

Like her mother, she remained unmarried. Anna Åfelt died on 22 May 1884.

In 1942, on the 100th anniversary of the Swedish public schools' establishment, a memorial stone was built on her grave in Önnestad cemetery.

== See also ==
- Helena Larsdotter Westerlund
