= 1892 Minnesota Secretary of State election =

- November 8, 1892
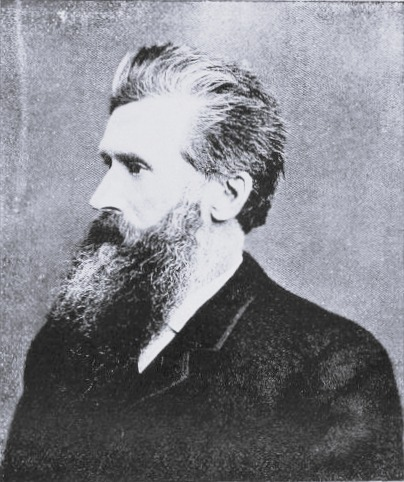

Nominee	Frederick P. Brown	Peter Nelson
Party	Republican	Democratic
Popular vote	105,010	96,758
Percentage	42.11%	38.80%
Nominee	Henry B. Martin	Hans H. Aaker
Party	Populist	Prohibition
Popular vote	35,047	12,585
Percentage	14.05%	5.04%
Secretary of State before election
Frederick P. Brown
Republican
Elected Secretary of State
Frederick P. Brown
Republican

The 1892 Minnesota Secretary of State election was held on November 8, 1892, in order to elect the Secretary of State of Minnesota. Republican nominee and incumbent Secretary of State Frederick P. Brown defeated Democratic nominee and former member of the Minnesota Senate Peter Nelson, People's nominee Henry B. Martin and Prohibition nominee Hans H. Aaker.

== General election ==
On election day, November 8, 1892, Republican nominee Frederick P. Brown won re-election by a margin of 8,252 votes against his foremost opponent Democratic nominee Peter Nelson, thereby retaining Republican control over the office of Secretary of State. Brown was sworn in for his second term on January 7, 1893.

=== Results ===
Minnesota Secretary of State election, 1892
Party	Candidate	Votes	%
Republican	Frederick P. Brown (incumbent)	105,010	42.11
Democratic	Peter Nelson	96,758	38.80
Populist	Henry B. Martin	35,047	14.05
Prohibition	Hans H. Aaker	12,585	5.04
Total votes		249,400	100.00
Republican hold			
