= India–Sweden relations =

- India: Sweden

Diplomatic mission
- Embassy of Sweden, New Delhi: Embassy of India, Stockholm

India–Sweden relations are the bilateral ties between India and Sweden. Sweden recognised India's independence from the United Kingdom in 1947; both nations established formal diplomatic relations in 1949. India has an embassy in Stockholm, while Sweden has an embassy in New Delhi and honorary consulates in Chennai, Kolkata and Mumbai.

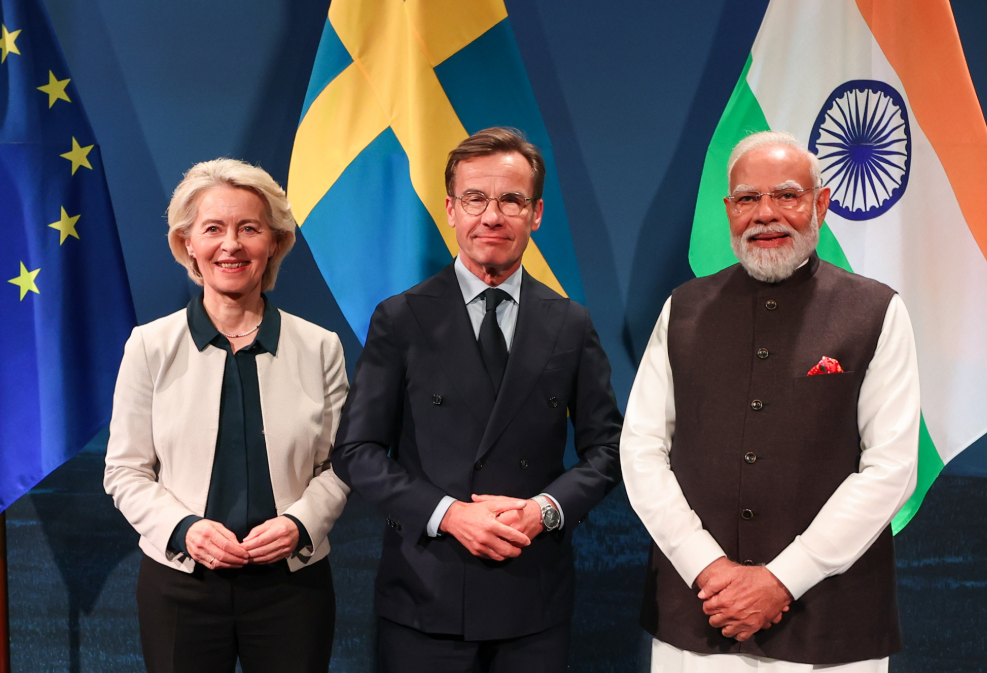
Prime Minister of Sweden Ulf Kristersson with Prime Minister of India Narendra Modi and Ursula von der Leyen in Sweden, May 2026.

About 40,000 Indian citizens reside and work in Sweden, along with a further 20,000 persons of Indian origin; both groups are mainly employed in business or professional fields.

== Historical relations ==
Contact between Sweden and the Indian subcontinent dates from at least the 8th century AD and the era of the Vikings. In 1954, a small bronze Buddha statue was discovered during archaeological excavations of an 8th-century Viking ship on Helgö, Sweden; now on display at the Swedish History Museum, the statue is thought to have been made in present-day Kashmir around the 5th century AD In March 2015, PostNord Sverige released a postage stamp depicting the statue.

During the mid-18th century, the newly established Swedish East India Company attempted to gain a trading foothold in India through ports in Bengal and at Surat in Gujarat; though a few of the company's ventures in India were profitable, the already long-established competition from the rival British, French and Dutch East India companies soon forced Sweden to focus on trading with China.

Bilateral ties date back to 1949, with Indian Prime Minister Jawaharlal Nehru visiting Sweden in 1957.

Prime Minister Indira Gandhi led the Indian delegation at the 1972 UN Conference on the Human Environment in Stockholm. In the 1980s, both countries collaborated on nuclear disarmament within the Six-Nation Peace Summit. Sweden co-hosted the Stockholm+50 conference in 2022, where India's delegation participated in discussions on climate and sustainability.

Several Swedish firms established branches in India during the early 20th century, notably Ericsson, Swedish Match and ASEA (now part of the ABB Group). SKF established a small branch in Kolkata in 1923; after Indian independence, SKF India Ltd was incorporated in 1961, establishing a bearing factory in Pune, Maharashtra two years later. Sweden hosted the first India-Nordic Summit in 2018, strengthening ties between India and the Nordic region.

Historically, India has maintained a strong relationship with Russia, a point of divergence with Sweden, which views Russia as a security threat.

== Political relations ==
Sweden recognised India as an independent nation in 1947, with both countries establishing formal diplomatic relations two years later. India set up a diplomatic mission in Stockholm in 1949 at the level of a legation, with the Indian head of mission holding the rank of an envoy extraordinary and minister plenipotentiary; in 1962, the mission was raised to the status of an embassy, with full ambassadorial rank. In 1957, Prime Minister Jawaharlal Nehru became the first Prime Minister of India to visit Sweden. Indira Gandhi, his daughter and successor as Prime Minister, attended the United Nations Conference on the Human Environment in Stockholm in 1972.

The Bofors scandal of 1987 damaged bilateral relations and led to the defeat of India's Congress Party in general elections two years later. The scandal was exposed by Swedish and Indian journalists; their investigations revealed that several officers of the noted Swedish armaments manufacturer Bofors, together with Swedish government officials, had paid large kickbacks to senior Indian politicians to secure the sale to India of 410 Haubits FH77 howitzers and related supplies.

India became an Observer in the Arctic Council in 2013 during Sweden’s presidency.

India and Sweden present a Joint Statement on Humanitarian Affairs annually at the UN General Assembly.

=== Bilateral visits ===
Since the 2000s, the degree of bilateral ties has consistently increased, as has the frequency of bilateral visits. Both governments have expressed their eagerness to enhance their economic and cultural relations. In 2016, Prime Minister of Sweden Stefan Löfven declared his support for India's candidature as a permanent member of the United Nations Security Council.

Four Indian Prime Ministers - Jawaharlal Nehru, Indira Gandhi, Rajiv Gandhi and Narendra Modi - have visited Sweden for official visits. Prime Minister of Sweden Göran Persson visited India in January 2004; Fredrik Reinfeldt visited India in November 2009 for the India-EU Summit and bilateral talks, while his successor Stefan Löfven visited Mumbai in February 2016 as leader of the Swedish delegation participating in the "Make In India" initiative. King Carl XVI Gustaf and Queen Silvia made a state visit to India in 1993, with the King leading a technology delegation to India in 2005. In June 2016, Pranab Mukherjee became the first President of India to make a state visit to Sweden.

Prime Minister Narendra Modi visited Sweden in 2018, leading to the adoption of a Joint Action Plan and a Joint Innovation Partnership. Sweden’s Prime Minister has engaged with Indian leaders in multiple international forums, including the India-EU Summit and COP meetings.

== Economic relations ==
India is among Sweden’s top 30 export partners and its third-largest in Asia. Trade grows by 27% year-over-year, with India importing Swedish machinery, iron, steel, electrical equipment, and vehicles. Swedish companies in India increased by 70% from 2018 to 2023, driven by labor-cost advantages. India's primary exports to Sweden are chemical products, food products and semi-manufactured and manufactured goods.

Swedish companies like Ericsson, Volvo, and IKEA have long been established in India, while Indian firms like TCS and HCL operate in Sweden. Foreign Direct Investment flows between the countries have been increasing since the 1990s, with Sweden investing heavily in India's manufacturing sector.

Disruptions such as the COVID-19 pandemic and the 2021 Suez Canal blockage affected trade flows between the two nations. The potential for increased trade is being explored through models like the Gravity Model of Trade.

=== International collaboration ===
The two nations co-founded the Leadership Group for Industry Transition (LeadIT) in 2019 with the World Economic Forum, aiming to promote sustainable industrial development. In 2023, Prime Ministers Narendra Modi and Ulf Kristersson launched LeadIT 2.0 for 2024-26. The India-Sweden Innovation Day, an annual event since 2013, promotes technological and scientific cooperation.

== Cultural relations ==
Cultural ties date back to 1913 when Rabindranath Tagore won the Nobel Prize in Literature, and he later visited Sweden in 1926. The Helgö Buddha, a bronze statuette from India, was discovered in Sweden in the 1950s, symbolizing ancient links. Sweden hosts Indian cultural festivals, including the annual Namaste Stockholm, and Indian classical arts, Ayurveda, and Yoga are widely appreciated.

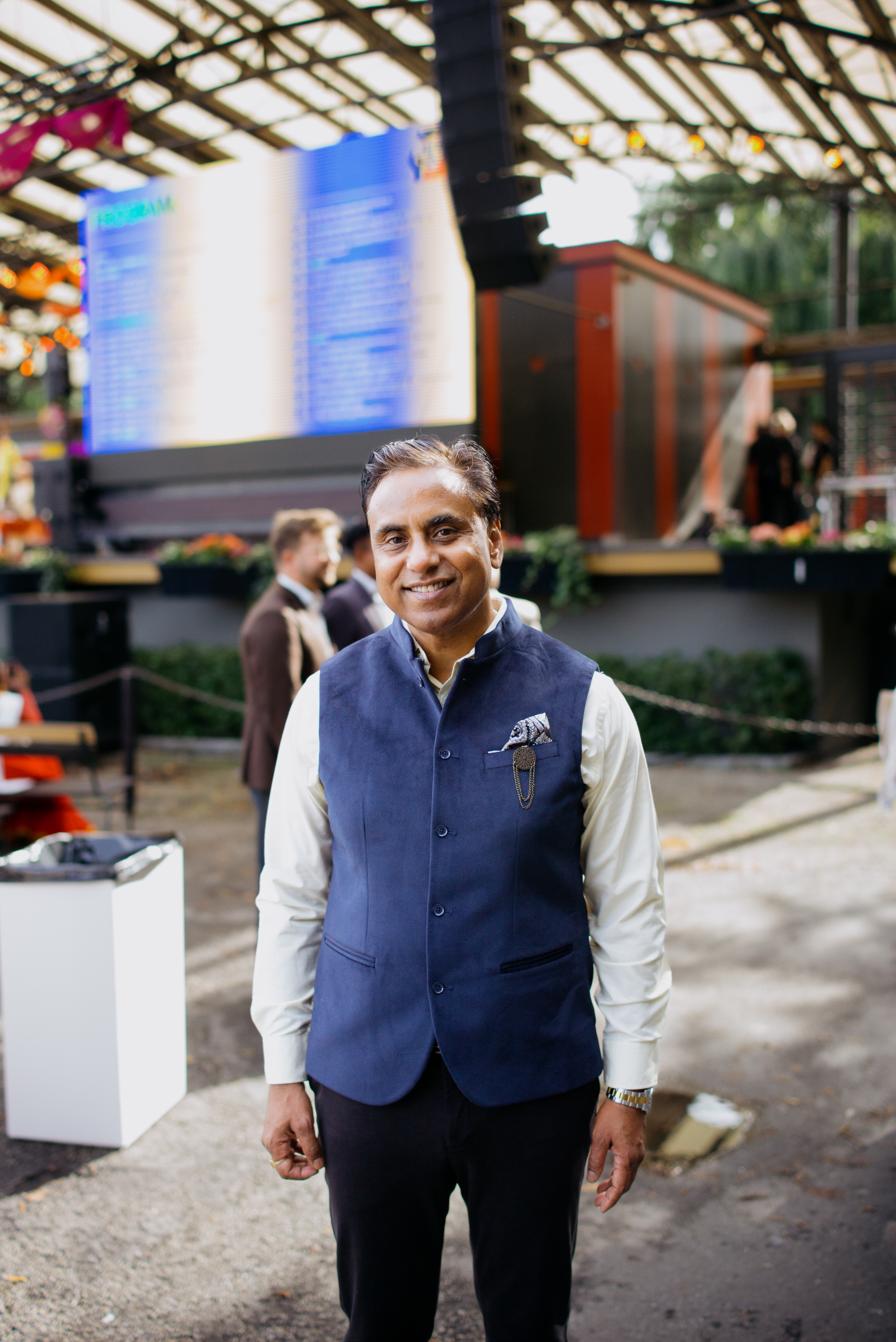
Indian Ambassador to Sweden Mr. Anurag Bhushan in front of the Namaste Stockholm event stage in 2025

Swedish technology and consumer brands like Truecaller and Spotify have gained popularity in India.

Cultural exchanges between India and Sweden include academic collaborations, Nobel Memorial events, and innovation summits. The annual Sweden-India Nobel Memorial Week promotes scientific and business linkages.

== Military relations ==
India and Sweden engage in defense cooperation, including industrial collaborations. A 2009 MoU established defense cooperation, with a 2019 General Security Agreement enhancing classified information sharing.

In 2021, Sweden’s Defense Minister participated in an India-Sweden Defence Industry Cooperation Webinar, leading to an MoU between the Society of Indian Defence Manufacturers and the Swedish Security and Defence Industry. The Swedish Chief of Air Staff attended India’s Aero India Show 2021.

Sweden and India have collaborated in defense and space technology, with Swedish defense firms like SAAB investing in India's defense sector. The 9th Joint Working Group on Defense Cooperation was held in 2023, and SAAB has set up a manufacturing unit for Carl-Gustaf shoulder-fired weapons in Haryana.

=== Space cooperation ===
Space cooperation includes Sweden’s participation in ISRO’s Venus mission and previous collaborations on the Chandrayaan-I mission.

== Resident diplomatic missions ==
- India has an embassy in Stockholm.
- Sweden has an embassy in New Delhi.

== See also ==
- Foreign relations of India
- Foreign relations of Sweden
- Indians in Sweden
- PewDiePie vs. T-Series
