= Frederick P. Brown =

American politician (1838 – 1925)

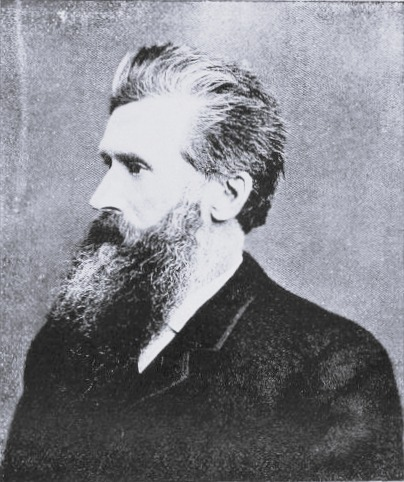
- Brown c. 1896

10th Minnesota Secretary of State
- In office January 5, 1891 – January 7, 1895
- Governor: William Rush Merriam; Knute Nelson
- Preceded by: Hans Mattson
- Succeeded by: Albert Berg

Register of Deeds of Blue Earth County, Minnesota
- In office 1872–1890

Personal details
- Born: Frederick Petersen Brun; August 12, 1838 Rogaland, Norway
- Died: February 7, 1925 (aged 86) Minnesota, U.S.
- Other political affiliations: Republican

Military service
- Allegiance: United States of America
- Branch/service: Union Army
- Years of service: 1861 – 1861
- Rank: Corporal
- Unit: Company K, 3rd Wisconsin Infantry Regiment
- Battles/wars: American Civil War: Battle of Front Royal

Frederick Petersen Brun (August 12, 1838 – February 7, 1925), often anglicized as Fredrick Petersen Brown, was a Norwegian-American sailor, farmer, clerk, veteran, and politician who served two consecutive terms as the tenth Minnesota Secretary of State from 1891 to 1895.

== Early life ==
Frederick Petersen Brun (anglicized as Brown) was born on August 12, 1838 in the town of Kopervik in Rogaland, Norway, then part of the Union between Sweden and Norway. His father was the captain of a merchant ship and engaged in the mercantile trade. Brown's family was descended from Johan Nordahl Brun, a notable Norwegian bishop of the Church of Norway. In his youth Brown was employed as a sailor which he did for seven years before emigrating to the United States in 1854. Brown eventually settled in Christiana, Wisconsin in Dane County where he worked as a clerk and farmer.

== Military service ==
During the American Civil War Brown served in the Union Army in Company K, the "Dane County Guards" of the 3rd Wisconsin Infantry Regiment under Captain William Hawley. According to the regiment's roster, Brown was discharged on June 30, 1861 due to illness. Following his military service Brown moved to Rochester, Minnesota in 1861 where he worked as a clerk.

== Politics ==
While still in Wisconsin Brown served a single term as the postmaster of the Wisconsin State Senate. In 1866 Brown moved to Blue Earth City in Faribault County, Minnesota where he was elected as the county register of deeds in 1872 and held the office until 1890. Brown was the longest holder of the county office out of any other prior officeholder.

Beginning in 1890 Brown campaigned as a candidate for the Republican Party of Minnesota for the office of Minnesota Secretary of State in the 1890 Minnesota Secretary of State election. Brown ended up winning the 1890 election with 42.11% of the majority vote and a slim +3.31% margin of victory against Minnesota Democratic Party candidate Peter Nelson, Populist Party candidate Henry B. Martin, and Prohibition Party candidate Hans Aaker. Brown would also run for a second term during the 1892 Minnesota Secretary of State election as a Republican against Democrat candidate Axel Lindholm, Farmers' Alliance candidate Michael Wesenberg, and Prohibition Party candidate Hans Hilleboe. Brown won the majority 40.33% of the vote with a +3.50% margin of victory. From 1891 to 1895 Brown would serve a total of two terms as Minnesota Secretary of State under Minnesota Governors William Rush Merriam and Knute Nelson. Brown was succeeded as Secretary of State by Albert Berg. Following his term as secretary of state Brown returned to farming.

== Personal life ==
Brown was married to Lena Larson in Rochester, Minnesota in 1863, together they had a total of eight children. Brown died on February 7, 1925 in Minnesota.
