= Constans Lundquist =

Swedish diplomat (1891–1950)

- Born: Oscar Constans Görgodt Lundquist; 10 March 1891; Lycksele, Sweden
- Died: 26 April 1950 (aged 59); Sydney, Australia
- Education: Stockholm School of Economics; University of Marburg
- Occupation: Diplomat
- Years active: 1917–1950

Oscar Constans Görgodt Lundquist (10 March 1891 – 26 April 1950) was a Swedish diplomat. After completing his education in Stockholm and Marburg, Germany, he embarked on a career in diplomacy, serving in various roles across Europe and the United States. Notably, he held positions in London, New York City, and Chicago before assuming the role of Consul General in Montreal and later Calcutta. Transferred to Australia in 1945, he played a pivotal role in establishing the Swedish legation in Sydney and overseeing its relocation to Canberra, dying before its completion in 1951, along with his architect brother.

== Early life ==
Lundquist was born on 10 March 1891 in Lycksele, Sweden, the son of Pehr Fredrik Lundquist, a district medical officer, and his wife Alma Malmberg. He had two brothers: the architect Edvard Lundquist and the physician Otto Lundquist. After passing his mogenhetsexamen in 1911 in Stockholm, Lundquist graduated from the Stockholm School of Economics in 1913 and earned his administrative degree (kansliexamen) in 1915. He studied at the University of Marburg in Marburg, Germany, from 1915 to 1916.

== Career ==
Lundquist was employed as an attaché at the Ministry for Foreign Affairs in Stockholm in 1917, served in Copenhagen the same year, Moscow from 1917 to 1918, and in Hamburg from 1918 to 1920. He was acting vice-consul in London in 1920, in New York City in 1921, and in Rotterdam in 1923, and served at the Ministry for Foreign Affairs the same year. Lundquist returned to London in 1926, where he became acting legation counselor in 1927. That same year, he became acting director (byråchef) at the Ministry for Foreign Affairs and head of the 2nd Office (2:a byrån) in the Legal Department at the Ministry for Foreign Affairs in 1928. He had a special assignment in the United States in 1929 and was consul in Chicago in 1930. In 1933, he was the Swedish commissioner at the Chicago World's Fair. Lundquist became Consul General in Montreal in 1936. From 1 January 1940, he was Consul General in Calcutta. In 1942, the consulate general in Calcutta moved to Bombay.

Lundquist was subsequently Consul General in London in 1944. During his stay in London, his private residence was somewhat damaged due to a bomb strike near Hyde Park. In September 1944, parts of the Swedish consulate general in Holborn were destroyed by an air raid. In 1945, he was transferred to Australia, where he became Consul General at Sydney with jurisdiction in the Fiji Islands. He was appointed Envoy to Sydney in August 1947 when the Swedish legation was established and the consulate general closed. In October 1947, he presented his credentials as Sweden's first envoy to Australia to Governor-General William McKell.

That same year, plans began for moving the legation from Sydney to Canberra, and Lundquist was tasked with leading the construction project on the 30,000 square meter plot in the southern part of Canberra. He contacted his older brother Edvard Lundquist, who was then the county architect in Västmanland. Both brothers died before the legation was completed in 1951.

== Death and state funeral ==
Lundquist died in office as Envoy due to a sudden heart attack on 26 April 1950. About 4,000 people lined King and Phillip Streets for the state funeral on 1 May 1950, which began at St James' Church. More than 300 people attended the service. A guard of honor consisting of three officers and 50 troops from the 1st Battalion, Royal Australian Regiment, led the procession. The coffin was carried on a gun carriage, following the Battalion band. Policemen lined Philip Street and stood at attention while the band and guard of honor marched to Handel's Funeral March. The cortege traveled from St James' Church to the Northern Suburbs Crematoriun, passing along Phillip, Bridge, George, and Grosvenor Streets and the Bradfield Highway. Chief mourners included the Swedish Chargé d'Affaires, Mr. Bo Alander, the Vice-Consul of Sweden, Mr. Knutzelius, Mrs. Knutzelius, and members of the Swedish legation. Others in attendance were Captain F. B. Morris, R.A.N. (representing the governor-general, William McKell), Flight Lieutenant R. B. Nash, A.D.C. (representing the governor of New South Wales, Lieutenant General John Northcott), the Minister for External Affairs, Percy Spender (representing the Commonwealth Government), and the Ambassador of China and Dean of the Diplomatic Corps, Dr. Dr. Kan Nai-kuang.

The urn containing the remains of Lundquist arrived in Gothenburg on 18 June 1950, aboard Rederi AB Transatlantic's motor ship Mattawunga. The remains were handed over to Lundquist's sister-in-law, Mrs. Dr. Otto Lundquist, and a representative of the Ministry for Foreign Affairs, Secretary Åke Jonsson. The minesweeper HSwMS Ven met Mattawunga at Vinga, where the urn was taken aboard and placed on a catafalque on the quarterdeck. When the minesweeper arrived at Gothenburg Naval Station, the urn was surrounded by an honor guard of four officers and non-commissioned officers. At Nya Varvet, troops from the navy and a band paraded. As the minesweeper passed the police pier, the flags on the West Coast Naval District and naval station office buildings, as well as the flag and pennant on the naval ships in the harbor, were lowered to half-mast. When the urn was handed over to Jonsson and Mrs. Dr. Otto Lundquist, "Du gamla, du fria" was played. The urn was then carried past the troops, who formed a line to a car while the band played a funeral march. Once the car left the outer area of Nya Varvet, the flags were raised to full mast. The minesweeper Ven honored Lundquist's memory with a wreath of roses and oak leaves.

== Awards and decorations ==
- (Sweden) Commander 1st Class of the Order of the Polar Star
- Commander 1st Class of the Order of the Lion of Finland
- (Spain) Commander of the Order of Civil Merit
- (Hungary) Grand Officer of the Hungarian Order of Merit

Diplomatic posts
Preceded by Carlo von Dardel	Consul of Sweden to Chicago; 1929–1936	Succeeded by Gösta Oldenburg
Preceded by Magnus Clarholm	Consul General of Sweden to Montreal; 1936–1939	Succeeded by Gustaf Löwenhard
Preceded by Gösta Brunnström	Consul General of Sweden to Calcutta; 1940–1942	Succeeded by None
Preceded by None	Consul General of Sweden to Bombay; 1942–1944	Succeeded by Magnus Hallenborg
Preceded by Emil Sahlin	Consul General of Sweden to London; 1944–1945	Succeeded by Nils Ihre
Preceded by Carlo von Dardel	Consul General of Sweden to Sydney; 1945–1947	Succeeded by None
Preceded by None	Envoy of Sweden to Australia; 1947–1950	Succeeded by Martin Kastengren
