= Embassy of Sweden, New Delhi =

Diplomatic mission in India

- Address: 4-5 Nyaya Marg, Chanakyapuri, New Delhi, Delhi 110021
- Coordinates: 28.59435°N 77.18494°E
- Opened: 1949
- Ambassador: Jan Thesleff
- Jurisdiction: India; Bhutan; Nepal; Maldives; Sri Lanka
- Website: Official website

The Embassy of Sweden in New Delhi is Sweden's diplomatic mission in India. The embassy is headed by the ambassador of Sweden to India. The embassy is situated in Chanakyapuri, the diplomatic enclave of New Delhi, where most of the embassies in India are located. The Swedish embassy is responsible for the honorary consulates in India, located in Kolkata and Chennai, and the Swedish consulate general in Mumbai. The ambassador of New Delhi is also accredited to Sri Lanka, Nepal, Bhutan and Maldives.

== History ==
A Swedish legation in New Delhi was established in early 1949. The tasks that previously rested with the former Consulate General in Bombay were taken over by the legation. The legation was then located at the Cecil Hôtel in New Delhi. From 1950, it was located at 11 Ratendone Road (later renamed Amrita Shergil Marg) in New Delhi. In August 1956, an agreement was reached between the Swedish and Indian governments on the mutual elevation of the respective countries' legations to embassies. In connection with this, the then envoy Mrs. Alva Myrdal was appointed Sweden's ambassador in New Delhi.

In 1956, the mission was still located at 11 Ratendone Road and the chancery was located at 27 Prithviraj Road. In 1957, the mission was located at 22 Hardinge Avenue and the chancery was still located at 27 Prithviraj Road. From 1 June 1959, the address was Diplomatic Enclave, New Delhi.

The current embassy building was inaugurated in November 1959 in the presence of the then Prime Minister of India, Jawaharlal Nehru. The embassy building was designed by Swedish architects Sune Lindström and Jöran Curman. The 40,000 square meters of greenspace surrounding the embassy was landscaped by Walter Bauer. Once the embassy building, including the ambassador's residence reception rooms, staff housing and recreational areas were completed, it was formally handed over to the first Swedish ambassador Alva Myrdal. The Swedish organization SIDA moved into a new extension in the embassy area in 1988–89. The National Property Board of Sweden replaced the windows and doors in the accommodation buildings in 2005-06. In 2009, the Swedish Trade Council got new, larger offices and separate entrance in the embassy area.

== Staff and tasks ==
=== Staff ===
Around 40 employees work at the Swedish Embassy in New Delhi. The ambassador is also accredited to the Maldives, Nepal, Sri Lanka, and Bhutan.

=== Tasks ===
The work at the embassy is carried out across six different sections: the Political Section, Economic Section, Administrative and Consular Section, Migration Section, Office of Innovation and Science, and the Defence Attaché's Office.

== See also ==
- India–Sweden relations
- Consulate General of Sweden, Mumbai
