= Embassy of Sweden, London =

Diplomatic mission of Sweden in London

- Location: Marylebone, London
- Address: 11 Montagu Place; London W1H 2AL; United Kingdom
- Coordinates: 51°31′8″N 0°9′37.2″W
- Ambassador: Stefan Gullgren
- Jurisdiction: United Kingdom
- Website: Official website

The Embassy of Sweden in London is the diplomatic mission of Sweden in the United Kingdom. The Swedish embassy is located in Marylebone, London, and represents the Swedish government in the United Kingdom.

== Staff and tasks ==
=== Staff ===
At the Swedish embassy in London, around 30 people work on a range of different issues. Both seconded Swedish diplomats and local employees work here.

=== Tasks ===
The Embassy of Sweden in the United Kingdom is organized into several key departments:

- Political, Economic, and Trade Department: This department's primary responsibility is to represent Sweden in its interactions with UK officials across various areas, including domestic and foreign policy, security, EU cooperation, and economic matters. It also promotes Swedish trade interests and the overall image of Sweden, including communication efforts.
- Defence Department: Part of the Swedish Armed Forces, this department supports military cooperation between Sweden and the UK and manages diplomatic clearances for Swedish military personnel, state aircraft, and naval vessels in British territory.
- Innovation and Research Office: Opened in 2022, this office is a joint initiative of several Swedish ministries. It focuses on developing and promoting collaboration between the UK and Sweden in areas such as life sciences, exports and investments, research, innovation, and government cooperation programs.
- Consular Department: This department handles daily consular matters concerning Swedish citizens in the UK, including emergencies, deaths, birth registrations, paternity issues, coordination numbers, passport services, and some visa and legal matters.
- Cultural Department: The Cultural Department promotes Swedish culture in the UK, including literature, art, dance, music, film, and theater, and works to establish cultural connections and collaborations between the two countries.

== Buildings ==
=== Chancery ===
In 1907, the Swedish legation in London moved into rented premises at 73 Portland Place. It was used both as chancery and as ambassadorial residence. In 1921, the townhouse at 27 Portland Place was purchased and a 999-year lease with the English landowner Baron Howard de Walden was agreed. The purchase price was 1,200,000 Swedish kronor, with a 999-year lease contract for a total redemption sum of 27,000 pounds. In addition, approximately 38,500 pounds were spent on renovations.

In mid-1947, it was reported that the legation building would undergo extensive repairs. All windows, which were both outdated in design and damaged during wartime bombings, were to be replaced with new, modern Swedish-made ones. Additionally, all premises were to be repainted, a task carried out by Swedish workers.

After the Second World War, the embassy found itself increasingly in need of space and the neighbouring property 29 Portland Place was therefore rented. The two properties were connected in a number of places. The lease on No. 29 was terminated in the early 1970s. Between 1970 and 1983, the chancery was located at 23 North Row in Mayfair, across the street from Marble Arch. Between 1970 and 1973, the embassy and the Swedish consulate general in London were colocated at 23 North Row. Since 1983, the chancery building is located at 11 Montagu Square in Marylebone, just down the road from the embassy of Switzerland. Sweden also maintains a Trade Council at 259-269 Old Marylebone Road, Marylebone.

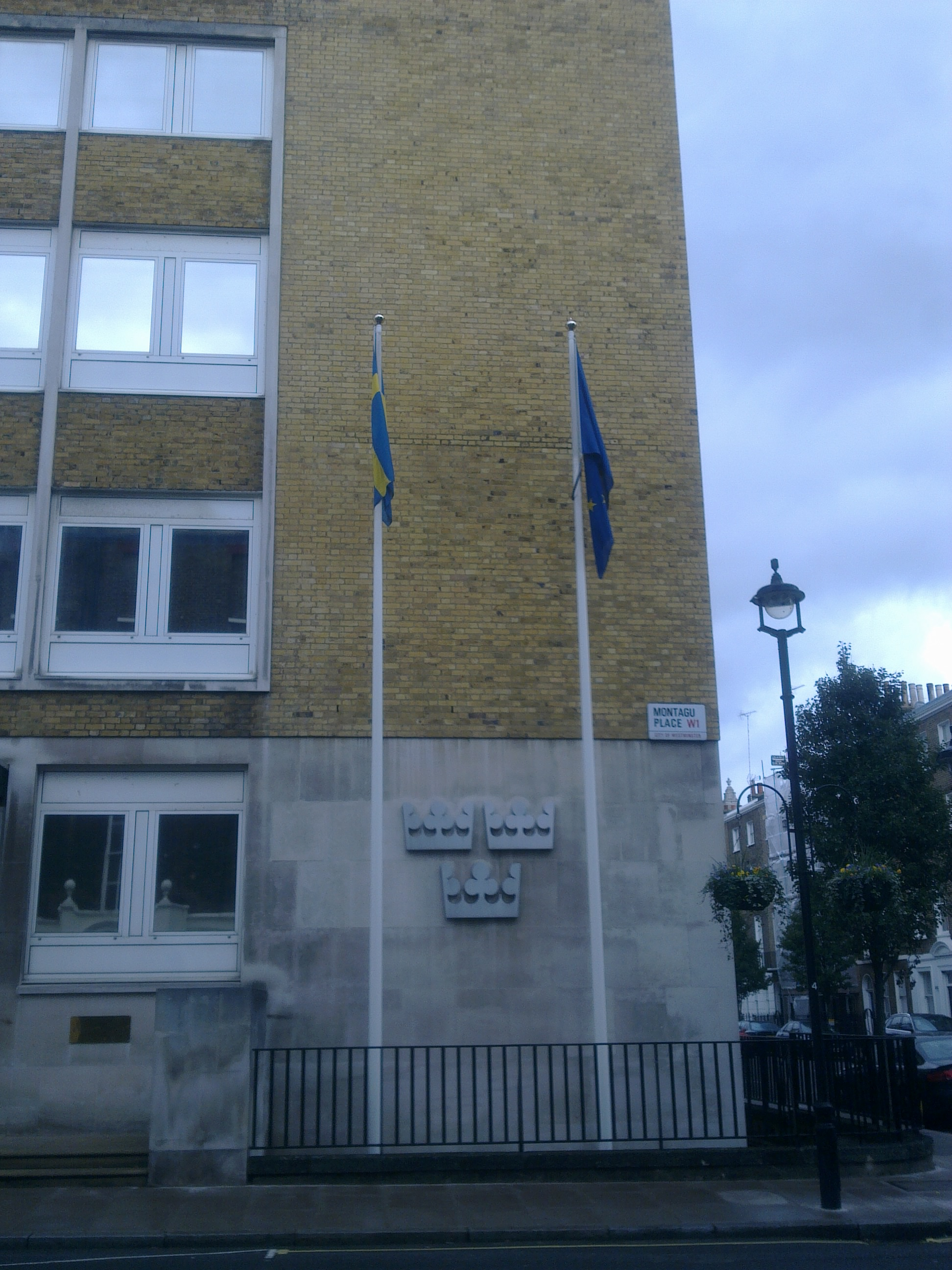
Close-up of the Three Crowns on the embassy

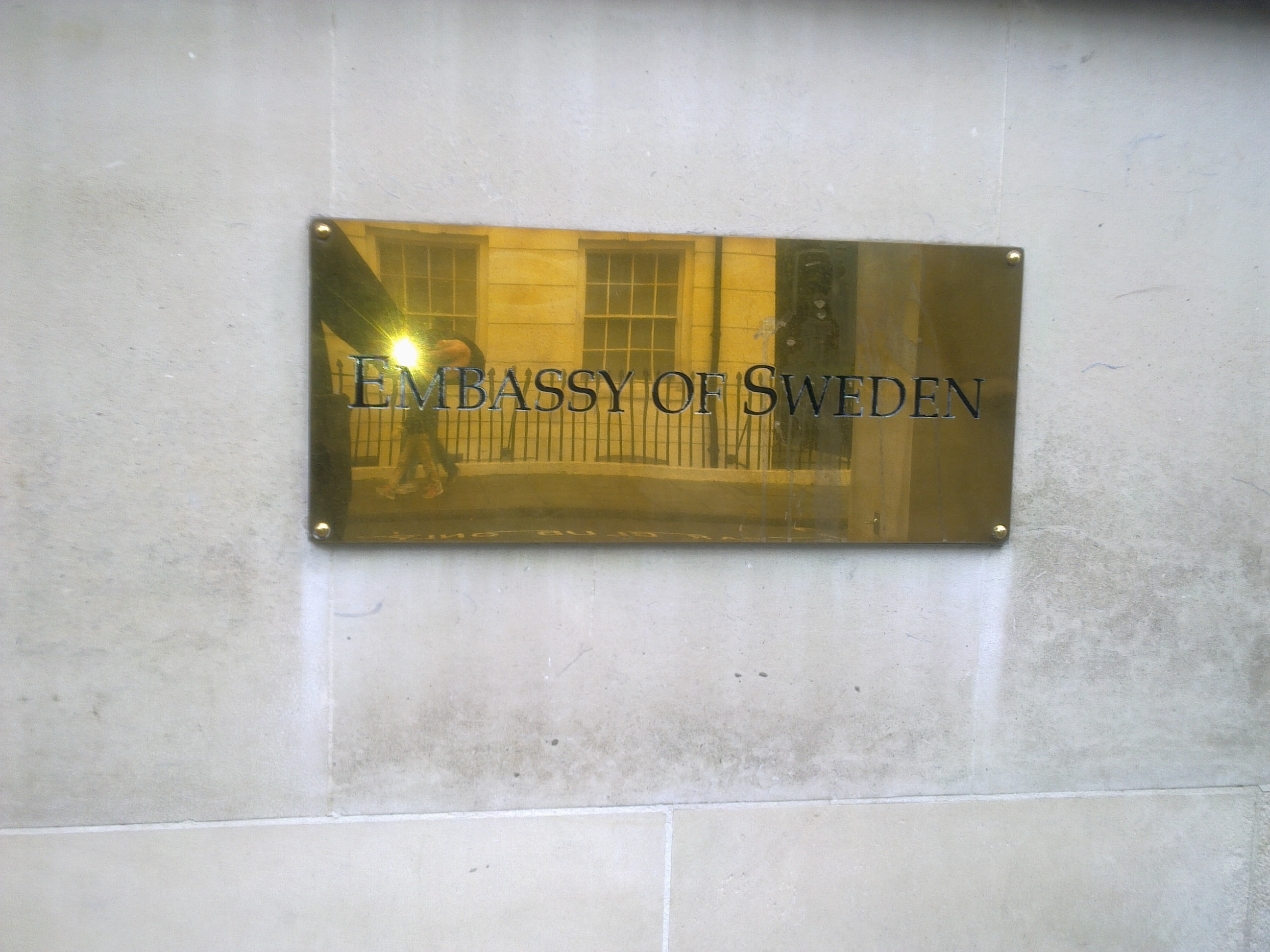
Plaque outside the embassy

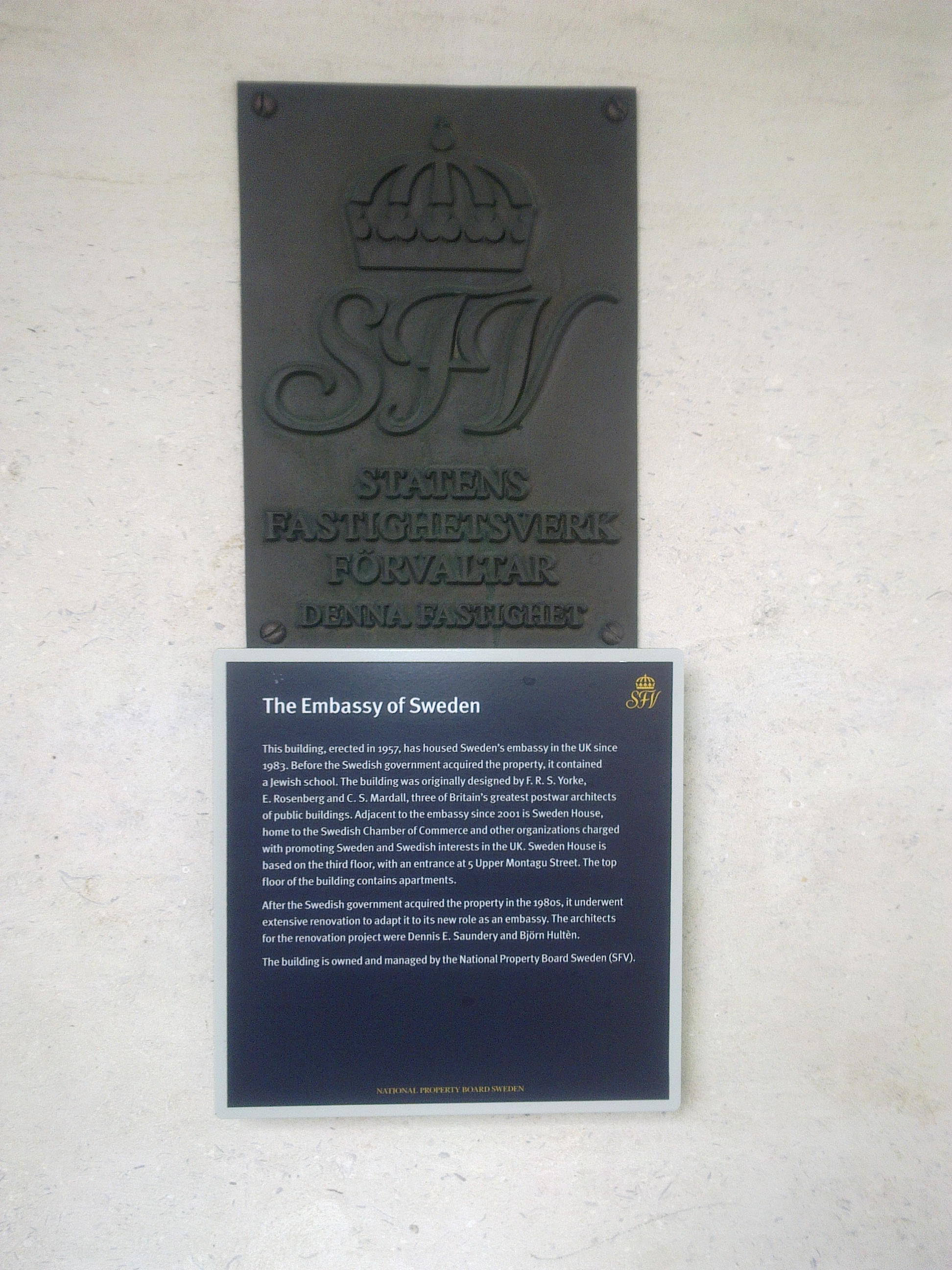
Plaque in Swedish and information panel outside the embassy

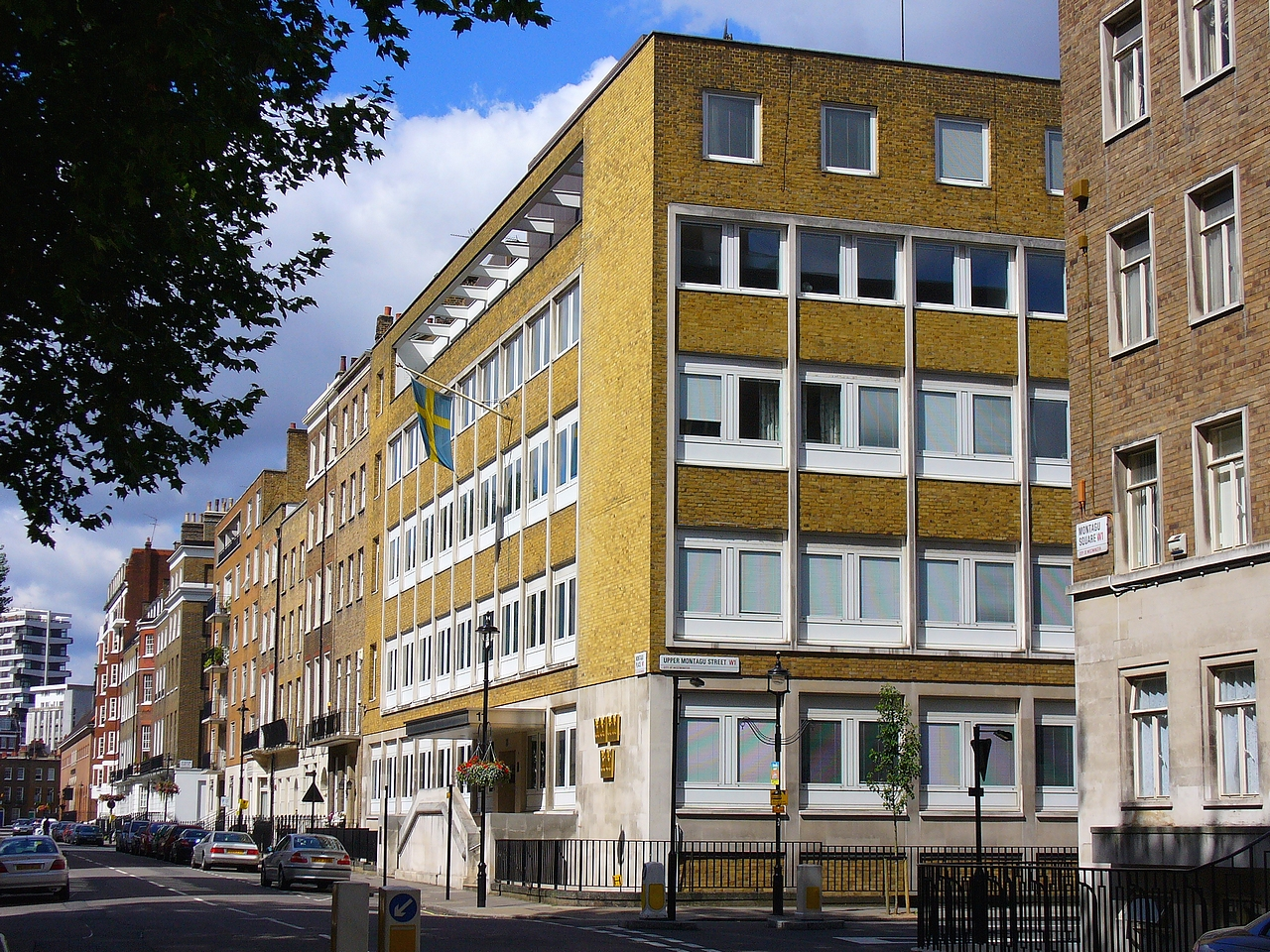
The embassy in 2005

=== Residence ===
The ambassadorial residence is located at 27 Portland Place since 1921. It has been used as chancery and as residence but since 1983 it has been used solely as a residence.

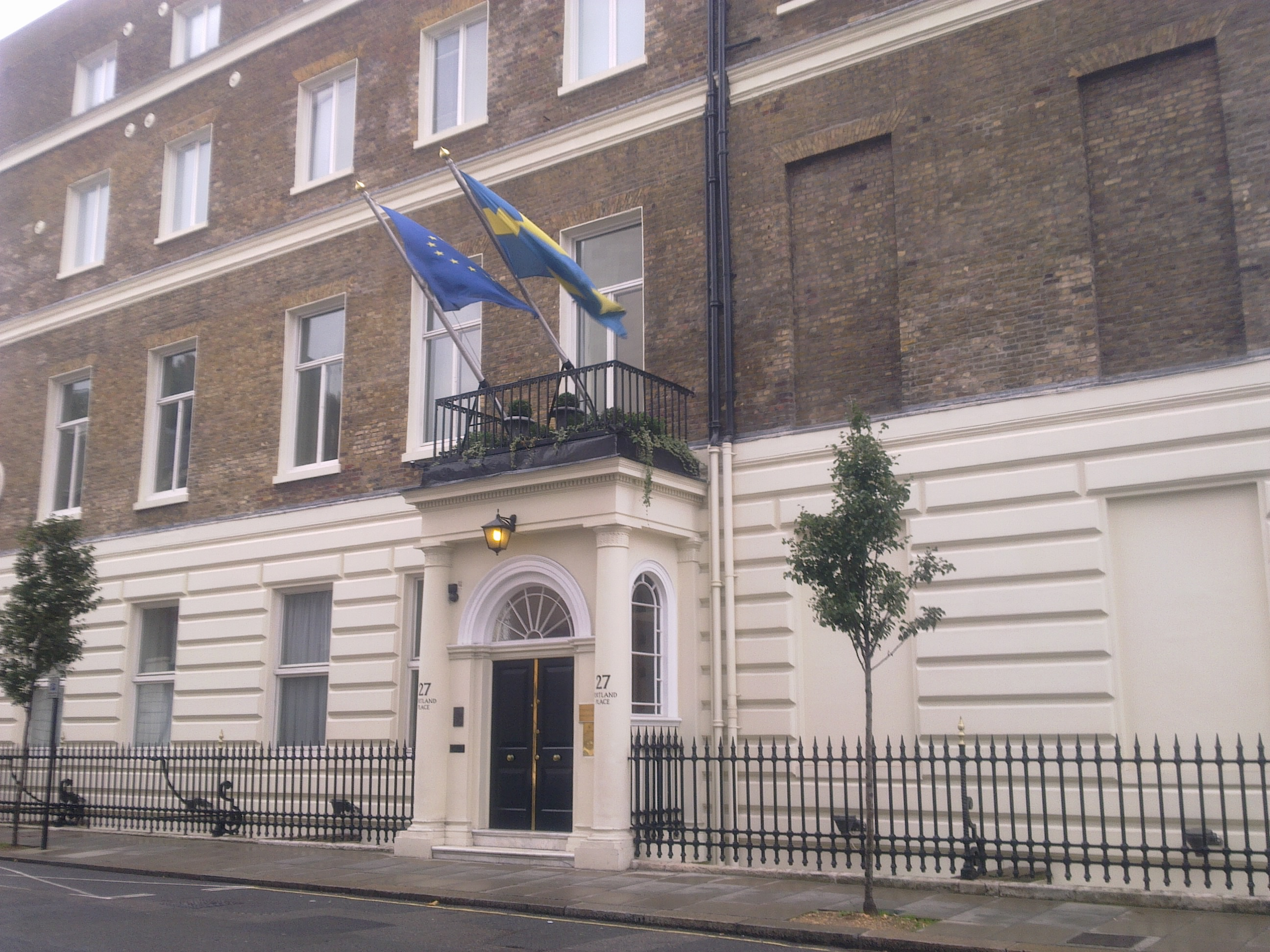
The ambassadorial residence at 27 Portland Place

== See also ==
- Sweden–United Kingdom relations
- Consulate General of Sweden, London
