= Magnus Hallenborg =

Swedish diplomat (1894–1980)

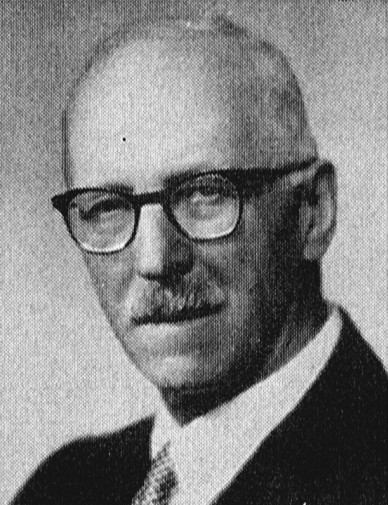
- Born: Carl Albert Magnus Hallenborg; 26 March 1894; Stockholm, Sweden
- Died: 22 December 1980 (aged 86); Stockholm, Sweden
- Resting place: Norra begravningsplatsen
- Education: Stockholm University College
- Occupation: Diplomat
- Years active: 1917–1960
- Spouse: Helen Thompson (m. 1933)
- Children: 3

Carl Albert Magnus Hallenborg (26 March 1894 – 22 December 1980) was a Swedish diplomat. Hallenborg joined the Swedish Foreign Service in 1921. He held diplomatic positions in Vienna, Chicago, Antwerp, and Rotterdam, becoming vice consul in Minneapolis in 1931 and first legation secretary in Helsinki in 1934. Hallenborg served as Consul General in Bombay between 1944 and 1948, in Antwerp between 1948 and 1949, and in London from 1949 to 1960.

== Early life ==
Magnus was born into the noble Hallenborg family in Stockholm, Sweden, on 26 March 1894. His father, Colonel Carl Hallenborg (1865–1934), became Crown Equerry and head of the Royal Stables in 1928. Hans farfar var parliamentary and county council politicians Magnus Hallenborg (1828–1892). Hans mor, Anna Sandströmer (born 1868), var dotter till envoyén Carl Johan Albert Sandströmer (1832–1869). He had one brother, Colonel Sven Hallenborg (1898–1966).

On 4 June 1912, Hallenborg passed studentexamen at Helsingborgs högre allmänna läroverk in Helsingborg. Hallenborg enrolled at Stockholm University College the same year and graduated with a Candidate of Law degree on 31 January 1917.

== Career ==
Hallenborg served as a clerk at the court in Södra Roslags judicial district (Södra Roslags domsaga) from 1917 to 1919. He became a second lieutenant in the Svea Life Guards reserve on 31 December 1917, and managed the office of the district judge in the Northern Jämtland judicial district (Norra Jämtlands domsaga) between 14 October 1919, and 3 January 1920. He was subsequently an assistant in the Ministry for Civil Service Affairs, later the Ministry of Health and Social Affairs. Hallenborg became a underlöjtnant in the Svea Life Guards reserve on 31 December 1919.

In February 1921, Hallenborg was employed as an acting official at the Legal, Financial and Administrative Services Agency. On 3 June of the same year, he was employed as an attaché in the Ministry for Foreign Affairs. Hallenborg became a lieutenant in the Svea Life Guards reserve on 28 October 1921, and an attaché at the Swedish legation in Vienna on 29 November of the same year. He became an attaché at the Swedish consulate in Chicago on 8 December 1922, and served as acting second vice consul in Antwerp between 30 June 1923, and 30 June 1924, as well as at the consulate in Rotterdam between 16 September 1924, and 14 November of the same year. Hallenborg was once again an attaché in the Ministry for Foreign Affairs on 14 November 1924. He became acting administrative officer (byråsekreterare) in the Ministry for Foreign Affairs on 24 February 1927, and acting second legation secretary at the Swedish legation in Brussels and The Hague on 3 June 1927.

Hallenborg became vice consul in Minneapolis in 1931, first legation secretary in Helsinki in 1934, and director (byråchef) at the Ministry for Foreign Affairs in 1936. He served as chairman of the Relief Committee for Swedes in Russia (Understödsnämnden för rysslandssvenskar) from 1938 to 1944. He was one of three Swedish representatives at the Évian Conference in 1938. Hallenborg was then Consul General in Bombay from 1944 to 1948. During his tenure as Consul General in India, he led the Swedish delegation in negotiations for a bilateral aviation agreement between India and Sweden in New Delhi, as well as between Pakistan and Sweden in Karachi. In 1948, the consulate general in Bombay was closed, and the Consul General position was moved to Antwerp, Netherlands, where Hallenborg became Consul General. He served in Antwerp from 1948 to 1949 and was subsequently Consul General in London from October 1949. One of his first assignments as Consul General in London was to conduct a maritime inquiry with Captain Hommerberg of the Swedish oil tanker Divina, which had collided with the British submarine HMS Truculent on 12 January 1950, resulting in the deaths of 64 people.

Hallenborg served in London until his retirement on 31 March 1960.

== Personal life ==
In 1933, Hallenborg married Helen Thompson (1904–1982) from Minnesota, the daughter of William Beard Thompson and his wife Hannah Mahoney. They had three children: Elisabeth (1934–2020), Carl (1936–1999), and Robert (born 1939).

After his retirement in 1960, Hallenborg and his wife settled on their farm by Lake Sommen in the South Swedish highlands.

== Death ==
Hallenborg died on 22 December 1980 in Lidingö Parish, Stockholm County. He was interred on 23 January 1981 at Norra begravningsplatsen in Solna, Stockholm County.

== Awards and decorations ==
=== Swedish ===
- (Sweden) Commander 1st Class of the Order of the Polar Star (6 June 1954)
- (Sweden) Commander of the Order of the Polar Star (4 November 1947)
- (Sweden) Knight of the Order of the Polar Star (6 June 1939)

=== Foreign ===
- Commander 1st Class of the Order of the Lion of Finland
- (United Kingdom) Knight Commander of the Royal Victorian Order (KStbVO1kl)
- (Hungary) Grand Officer of the Hungarian Order of Merit (October 1947)
- (Italy) Commander of the Order of Saints Maurice and Lazarus (20 October 1941)
- (Japan) 3rd Class of the Order of the Sacred Treasure
- (Netherlands) Officer of the Order of Orange-Nassau
- Knight 1st Class of the Order of the White Rose of Finland
- (Belgium) Knight of the Order of Leopold
- (Belgium) Order of the Crown (29 December 1926)
- (United Kingdom) British commemorative medal
- (United Kingdom) (Austria) Austrian Red Cross Honor Badge for Officers

Diplomatic posts
Preceded by Nils Jaenson	Vice Consul of Sweden to Minneapolis; 1931–1934	Succeeded by Carl Fredrik Hellström
Preceded by Constans Lundquist	Consul General of Sweden to Bombay; 1944–1948	Succeeded by None
Preceded by H. E. V. Petri	Consul General of Sweden to Antwerp; 1948–1949	Succeeded by John Setterwall
Preceded by Nils Ihre	Consul General of Sweden to London; 1949–1960	Succeeded by Carl Bergenstråhle
