= 1888 Minnesota Secretary of State election =

- November 6, 1888
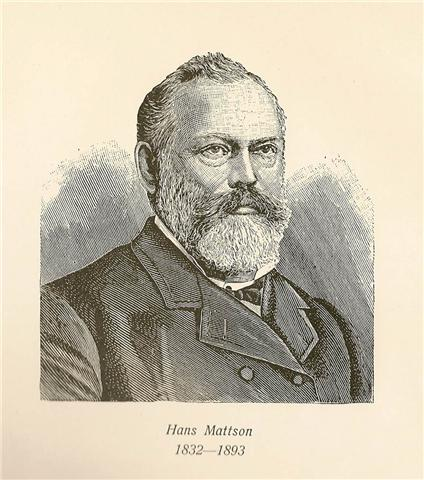

Nominee	Hans Mattson	William Bredenhagen	Peter Thompson
Party	Republican	Democratic	Prohibition
Popular vote	141,373	104,806	15,475
Percentage	53.93%	39.98%	5.90%
Secretary of State before election
Hans Mattson
Republican
Elected Secretary of State
Hans Mattson
Republican

The 1888 Minnesota Secretary of State election was held on November 6, 1888, in order to elect the Secretary of State of Minnesota. Republican nominee and incumbent Secretary of State Hans Mattson defeated Democratic nominee William Bredenhagen, Prohibition nominee Peter Thompson and Union Labor nominee John P. Schoenbeck.

== General election ==
On election day, November 6, 1888, Republican nominee Hans Mattson won re-election by a margin of 36,567 votes against his foremost opponent Democratic nominee William Bredenhagen, thereby retaining Republican control over the office of Secretary of State. Mattson was sworn in for his third overall term on January 9, 1889.

=== Results ===
Minnesota Secretary of State election, 1888
Party	Candidate	Votes	%
Republican	Hans Mattson (incumbent)	141,373	53.93
Democratic	William Bredenhagen	104,806	39.98
Prohibition	Peter Thompson	15,475	5.90
Union Labor	John P. Schoenbeck	466	0.19
Total votes		262,120	100.00
Republican hold			
