= 1886 Minnesota Secretary of State election =

- November 2, 1886
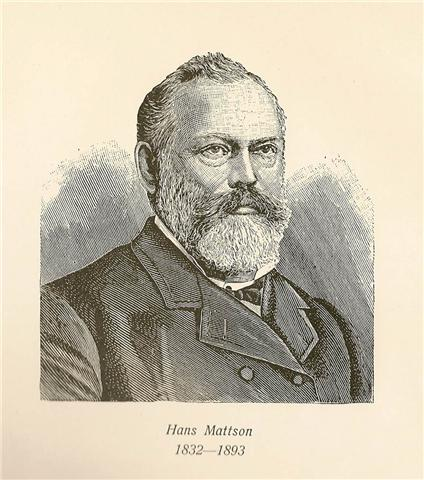

Nominee	Hans Mattson	Luther Jaeger
Party	Republican	Democratic
Popular vote	113,744	95,200
Percentage	52.19%	43.68%
Secretary of State before election
Frederick Von Baumbach
Republican
Elected Secretary of State
Hans Mattson
Republican

The 1886 Minnesota Secretary of State election was held on November 2, 1886, in order to elect the Secretary of State of Minnesota. Republican nominee and former secretary of state Hans Mattson defeated Democratic nominee Luther Jaeger and Prohibition nominee C.A. Bierce.

== General election ==
On election day, November 2, 1886, Republican nominee Hans Mattson won the election by a margin of 18,544 votes against his foremost opponent Democratic nominee Luther Jaeger, thereby retaining Republican control over the office of Secretary of State. Mattson was sworn in for his second non-consecutive term on January 5, 1887.

=== Results ===
Minnesota Secretary of State election, 1886
Party	Candidate	Votes	%
Republican	Hans Mattson	113,744	52.19
Democratic	Luther Jaeger	95,200	43.68
Prohibition	C.A. Bierce	8,991	4.13
Total votes		217,935	100.00
Republican hold			
