= Ayurveda Day =

Annual observance promoting awareness of Ayurveda

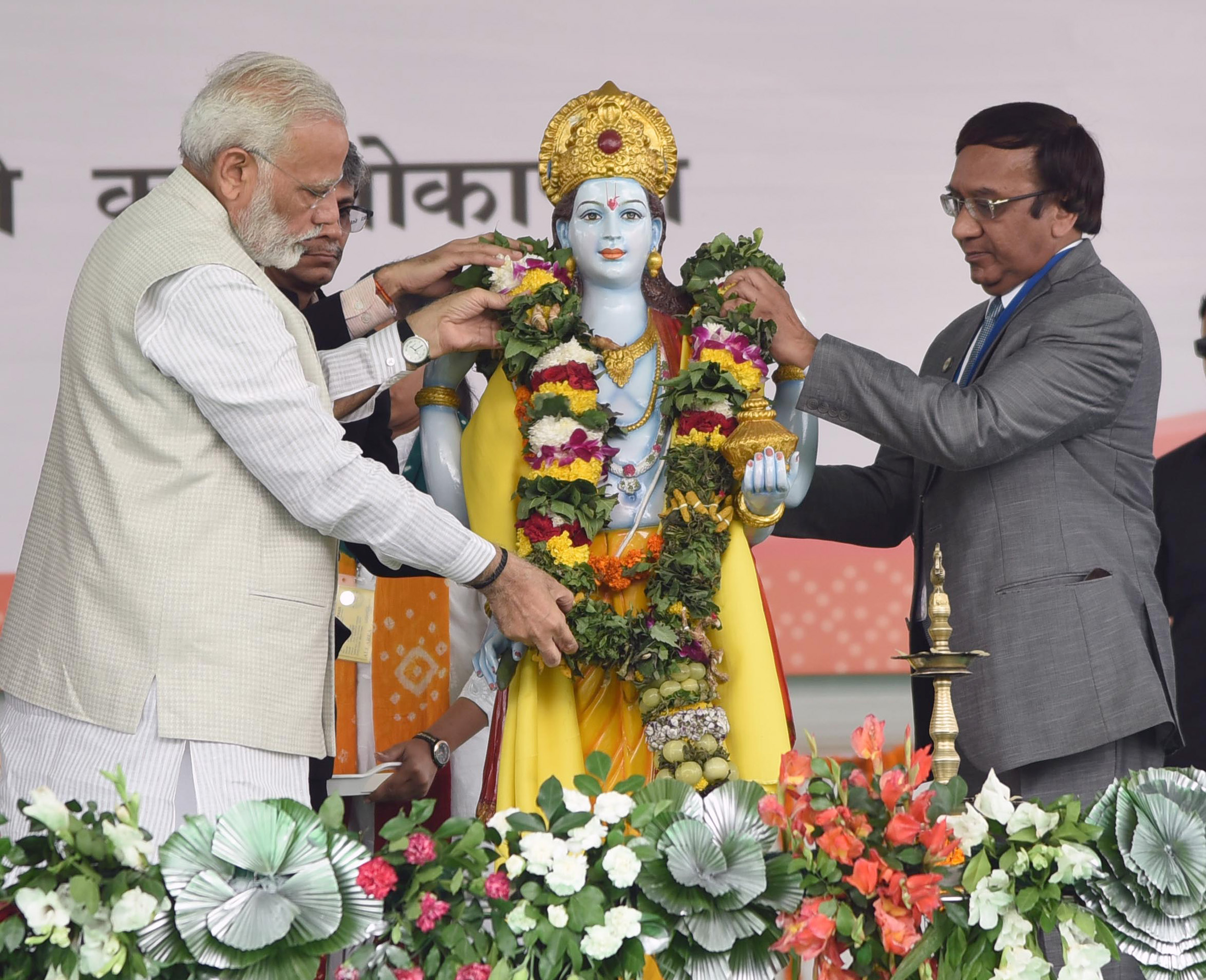
- Prime Minister Narendra Modi at the All India Institute of Ayurveda, Delhi on the second Ayurveda Day in 2017
- Observed by: India and participating institutions worldwide
- Significance: Promotion and public awareness of Ayurveda
- Observances: Awareness programmes, seminars, health camps and educational activities
- Date: 23 September
- Next time: 23 September 2027
- Frequency: Annual
- Related to: Ayurveda, Dhanvantari

Ayurveda Day, also known as National Ayurveda Day, is an annual observance associated with the promotion and public awareness of Ayurveda. It is observed on 23 September in India, with Ayurveda institutions, practitioners and other organisations also participating internationally.

The Government of India established the observance through the Ministry of Ayush in 2016. From 2016 through 2024, it was held on Dhanvantari Jayanti (Dhanteras), a date determined by the Hindu lunar calendar, and was associated with Dhanvantari, the physician of the Gods in Hindu mythology. The first National Ayurveda Day was observed on 28 October 2016.

In 2025, the government designated 23 September as the fixed annual date for Ayurveda Day, replacing the variable Dhanteras-based schedule. The change was notified through a government Gazette notification issued in March 2025; the Ministry of Ayush said that adopting a fixed date would provide consistency for national and international observances.

== History ==
National Ayurveda Day was first observed on 28 October 2016, coinciding with Dhanvantari Jayanti (Dhanteras). The inaugural observance included a seminar in New Delhi on the prevention and control of diabetes through Ayurveda and the launch of "Mission Madhumeh through Ayurveda", with diabetes selected as the theme for the first year. Later observances have included awareness programmes, workshops and free medical camps, with some camps also distributing medicines.

On the second Ayurveda Day, 17 October 2017, Prime Minister Narendra Modi dedicated the All India Institute of Ayurveda in New Delhi to the nation. The Ministry of Ayush also instituted the National Dhanwantari Ayurveda Award to recognise contributions to Ayurveda. The award comprises a citation, a trophy featuring a statue of Dhanvantari, and a cash prize of ₹5 lakh.

The sixth Ayurveda Day was observed on 2 November 2021 with the theme "Ayurveda for Poshan" ("Ayurveda for Nutrition"), focusing on nutrition and Ayurveda-based dietary practices. The seventh Ayurveda Day was observed on 23 October 2022 with the theme "Har Din Har Ghar Ayurveda" ("Ayurveda Every Day, Ayurveda Everywhere"). The All India Institute of Ayurveda, designated as the nodal agency for the observance, coordinated a six-week programme from 12 September to 23 October that included awareness activities and a quiz hosted on the MyGov platform.

== See also ==
- International Day of Yoga
