= Consulate General of Sweden, London =

Diplomatic mission of Sweden in London from 1772 to 1973

- Location: London
- Address: 23 North Row, London W1R 2DN (Note: The address when the consulate general closed in 1973.)
- Coordinates: 51.51287°N 0.15777°W
- Opening: 1722 (Note: The consulate general has its origins in the consulate which opened in 1722 which became a consulate general in 1850.)
- Closed: 1973
- Jurisdiction: Consular district below

The Consulate General of Sweden, London was the diplomatic mission of Sweden in London between 1850 and 1973. The consulate general originated from the consulate opened in 1722, which was converted into a consulate general in 1850. The tasks of the consulate general included consular services, promotion of trade relations, cultural and political relations, matters concerning the maritime industry, and more.

Its consular district initially encompassed the United Kingdom and Ireland. The district later comprised United Kingdom and Northern Ireland as well as associated islands. In 1973, the consulate general was merged into the Swedish embassy.

== History ==
In 1772, a consulate was established in London with United Kingdom and Ireland as its area of operation. According to King in Council's decision on 18 January 1786, the consul's income consisted of ship tonnage fees based on a tariff, which, according to the National Board of Trade circular on 21 August 1833, was to continue to be applied during the consul's tenure (letters patent of 29 June 1833). The consulate, whose consular district was to include United Kingdom and Ireland and surrounding islands according to the decision on 1 October 1823, was maintained by letters patent on 25 May 1850, as a consulate general for United Kingdom and Ireland. By letters patent on 14 April 1869, the consul general received a fixed salary (6,000 riksdaler Hamburger banco excluding office expenses), in addition to which the following salaried officials were employed as his assistants:

Vice consul, also secretary (salary 2,500 riksdaler Hamburger banco), clerk, also accountant and registrar (salary 1,500 riksdaler Hamburger banco), two office clerks (salary for each 1,000 riksdaler Hamburger banco). By the consul's tenure (letters patent of 29 June 1833). The consulate, whose district was to include United Kingdom and Ireland and surrounding islands according to the decision on 1 October 1823, was maintained by on 26 October 1877, the district of the consulate general was restricted to England and Ireland, and the salaries were designated in Swedish currency, so that the consul general received 24,000 SEK, the vice consul 10,000 SEK, the clerk 6,000 SEK, and the two office clerks 4,000 SEK each. However, the consul general received a personal salary supplement of 3,000 SEK from 1907 to 1913. The office clerk positions were abolished in 1906, and other salaries were reduced, but they were raised again at the Riksdag of 1910, so that they amounted to 21,000 SEK for the consul general, 9,000 SEK for the vice consul (from 7,200), and 5,500 SEK for the clerk, excluding four age supplements of 300 SEK each (previously 3,600 SEK). In addition, the salary for the second clerk position, established in 1909, was raised from 3,600 to 4,000 SEK in the same year (with age supplements equal to those of the first clerk). The latter salary was further increased to 4,500 SEK in 1913.

In September 1944, Staple Inn in Holborn was hit by a flying bomb, which also severely damaged the Swedish consulate general. The windows and doors were torn apart, and at least two rooms were rendered completely unusable. No work was taking place at the consulate at the time of the bombing. The consulate was now expected to be housed in the same building near Portland Place that accommodated the Swedish legation's military department. Consul General Constans Lundquist had also had his private residence somewhat damaged in connection with a strike near Hyde Park.

The consulate general was transferred to the Swedish embassy in 1973. The consulate general remained vacant from July 31 of the same year.

== Tasks ==
The tasks of the consulate general included handling passport and visa matters, providing information services, and dealing with issues related to the maritime industry, among others. The activities of the Consulate General changed after the Second World War. The regular trade reports were taken over by the Swedish embassy's trade department, and the Consulate General's most important task then lay in the area of maritime affairs, maritime declarations, and various forms of assistance to Swedish seamen. Disputes about working conditions on board ships were referred to the appropriate organizations without the Consulate General needing to act as an arbitrator.

Another task was to maintain contact with and provide advice and instructions to the honorary consulates, of which there were about 40, not only in the United Kingdom but also in British colonies in Africa, which were under the jurisdiction of the Consulate General in London. Additionally, the consulate issued passports for Swedes abroad and visas for citizens of countries for which the visa requirement still applied. Young people from Asia and Africa studying in London who wanted to go on holiday in Sweden applied for visas at the Consulate General. Swedes who wanted to work in England also turned to the Consulate General for help with permits.

== District ==
According to the decision made on 1 October 1823, the consular district was to include United Kingdom and Ireland as well as the surrounding islands. At the time of the consulate general's closure in 1973, its district comprised United Kingdom, Northern Ireland, and associated islands.

== Buildings ==
=== Chancery ===
On 29 September 1910, the chancery of the consulate general moved to 63 Finsbury Pavement in the London Borough of Islington. At the end of September 1919 the chancery moved to 329 High Holborn in Holborn, Central London. It remained there until 1947. In 1948, it moved to 14 Trinity Square, next to Byward Street in the City of London. At the same address, the Swedish Chamber of Commerce for the United Kingdom had been located since 1921.

In 1949 the address was 27 Portland Place in the Marylebone district of Central London, the same as the Swedish embassy, but from 1950 the address was again 14 Trinity Square. It remained here until 1969. In 1969 the house was to be sold and the chamber of commerce moved to new modern premises. From 1970 until its closure three years later, the consulate general was located at the same address as the Swedish embassy, at 23 North Row in Mayfair, across the street from Marble Arch.

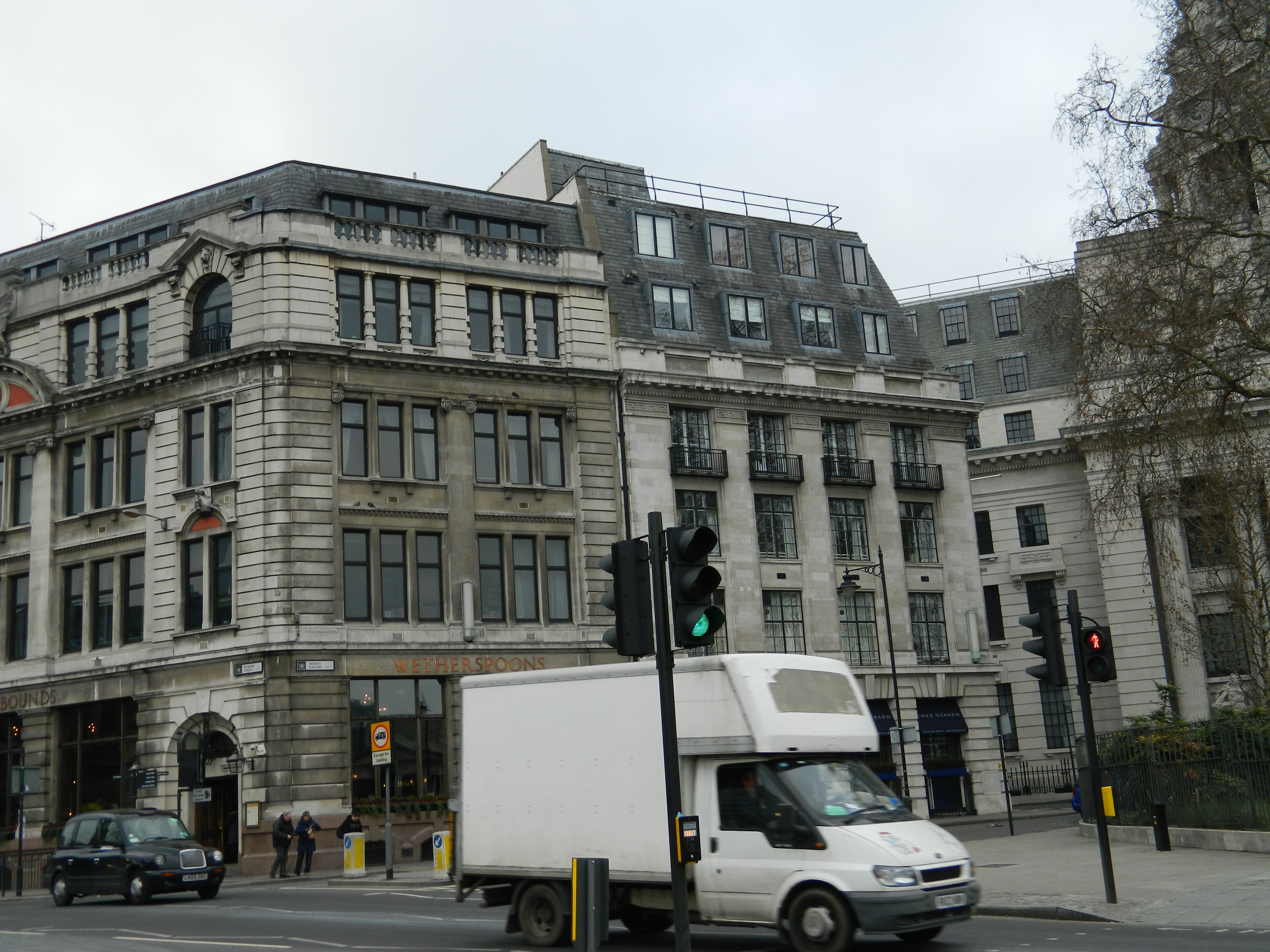
14 Trinity Square (1948–1969)

=== Residence ===
From at least 1965 to at least 1968, the residence was located at 58 Melton Court.

== Heads of Mission ==
Name	Period	Title	Notes	Ref
Jonas Alströmer	6 November 1722 – 11 September 1739	Consul		
Peter Christian Algehr	12 March 1772 – 20 November 1776	Consul		
Claes Grill (Note: During Grill's extended leave of absence, the consulate was overseen by Carl Henrik Grill from 14 May 1805, to †12 June 1811, and by Charles Tottie from 16 November 1813, to 15 March 1815.)	7 August 1777 – 15 March 1815.	Consul general	Consul general from 1786.	
Charles Tottie	15 March 1815 – 14 December 1869	Consul		
Theodor Willerding	20 May 1870 – 31 August 1877	Consul		
Ole Richter	7 June 1878 – 26 June 1884	Consul general		
Magnus Björnstjerna	31 October 1884 – 9 January 1886	Acting consul general		
Carl Juhlin-Dannfelt	9 January 1886 – 30 October 1898	Consul general		
Daniel Danielsson	24 October 1899 – 31 December 1913	Consul general		
Adolf Berencreutz	31 December 1913 – 31 December 1917	Consul general		
Emil Sahlin	1918 – 1 February 1944	Consul general		
Constans Lundquist	1944–1945	Consul general		
Nils Ihre	1945–1949	Consul general		
Magnus Hallenborg	26 September 1949 – April 1960	Consul general		
Carl Bergenstråhle	1 April 1960 – 1962	Consul general		
Göran von Otter	1962–1973	Consul general		

== See also ==
- Embassy of Sweden, London
