= Leksand Church =

Coordinates: 60.7311°N 14.9824°E

- Leksands kyrka
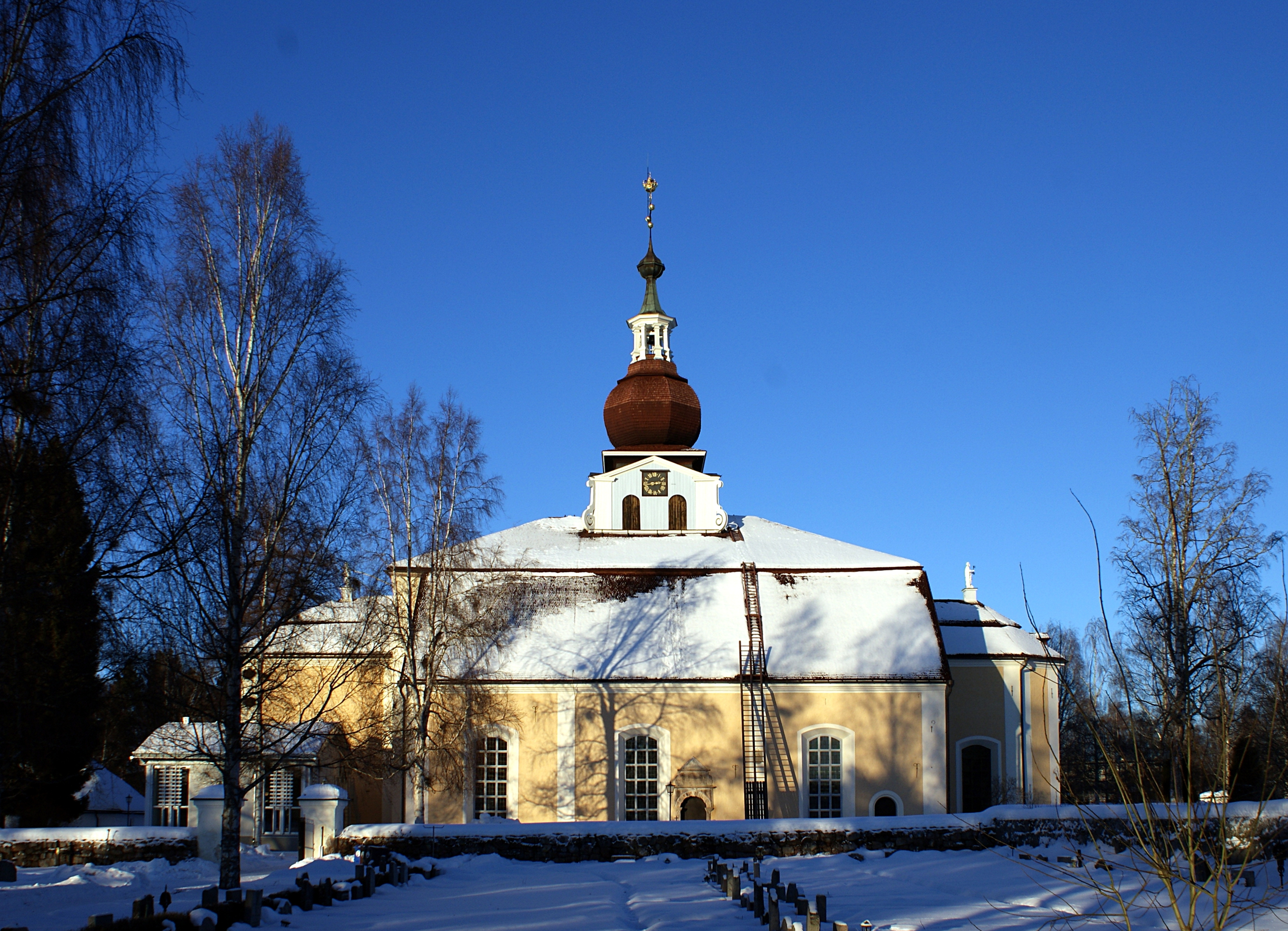
- Leksand Church in January 2011
- Leksand Church
- Location: Leksand
- Country: Sweden
- Denomination: Church of Sweden

Administration
- Diocese: Västerås
- Parish: Leksand

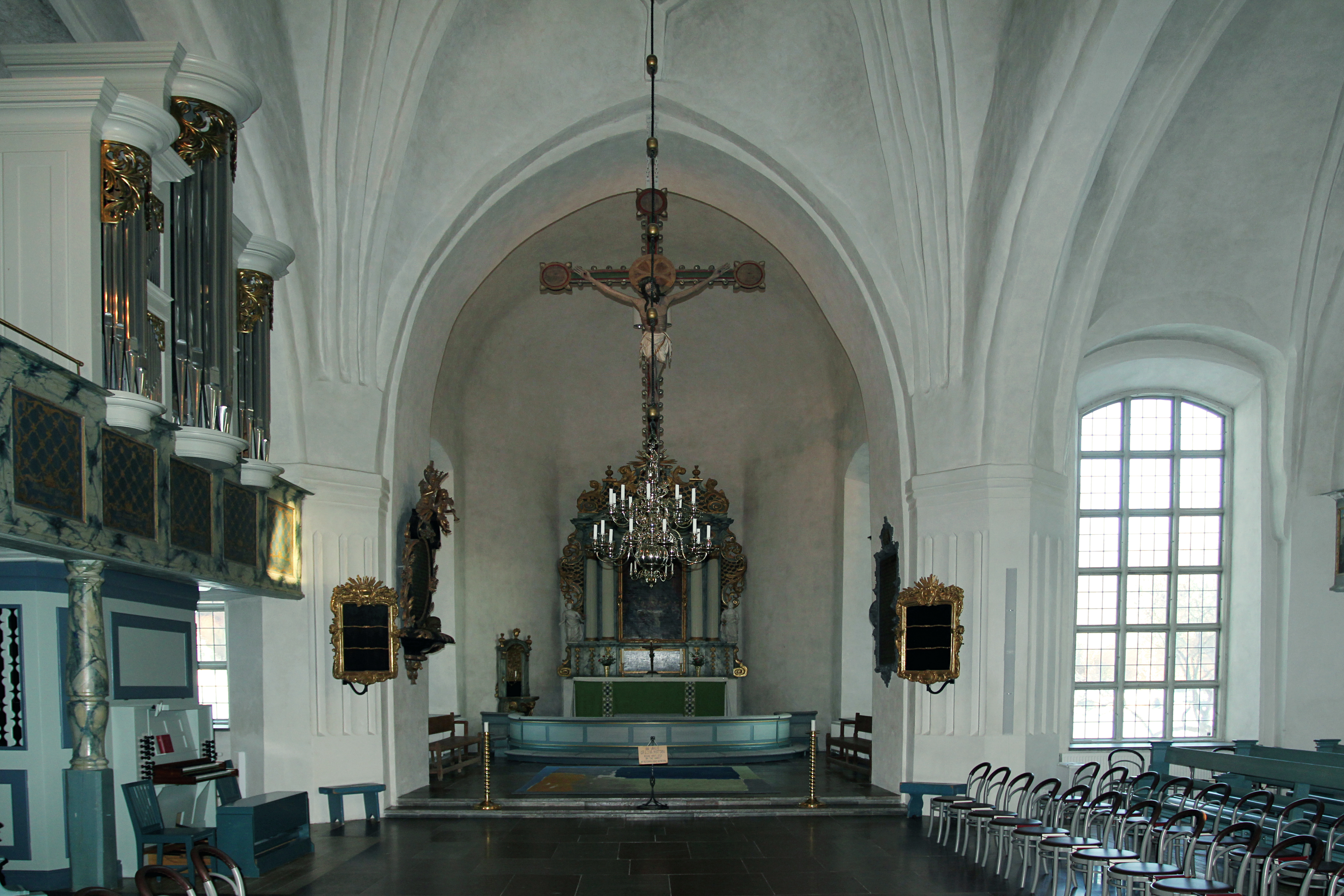
Inside Leksand Church

Leksand Church (Swedish: Leksands kyrka) is a church building in Leksand in Sweden. It belongs to the Leksand Parish of the Church of Sweden.
