= Önnestad =

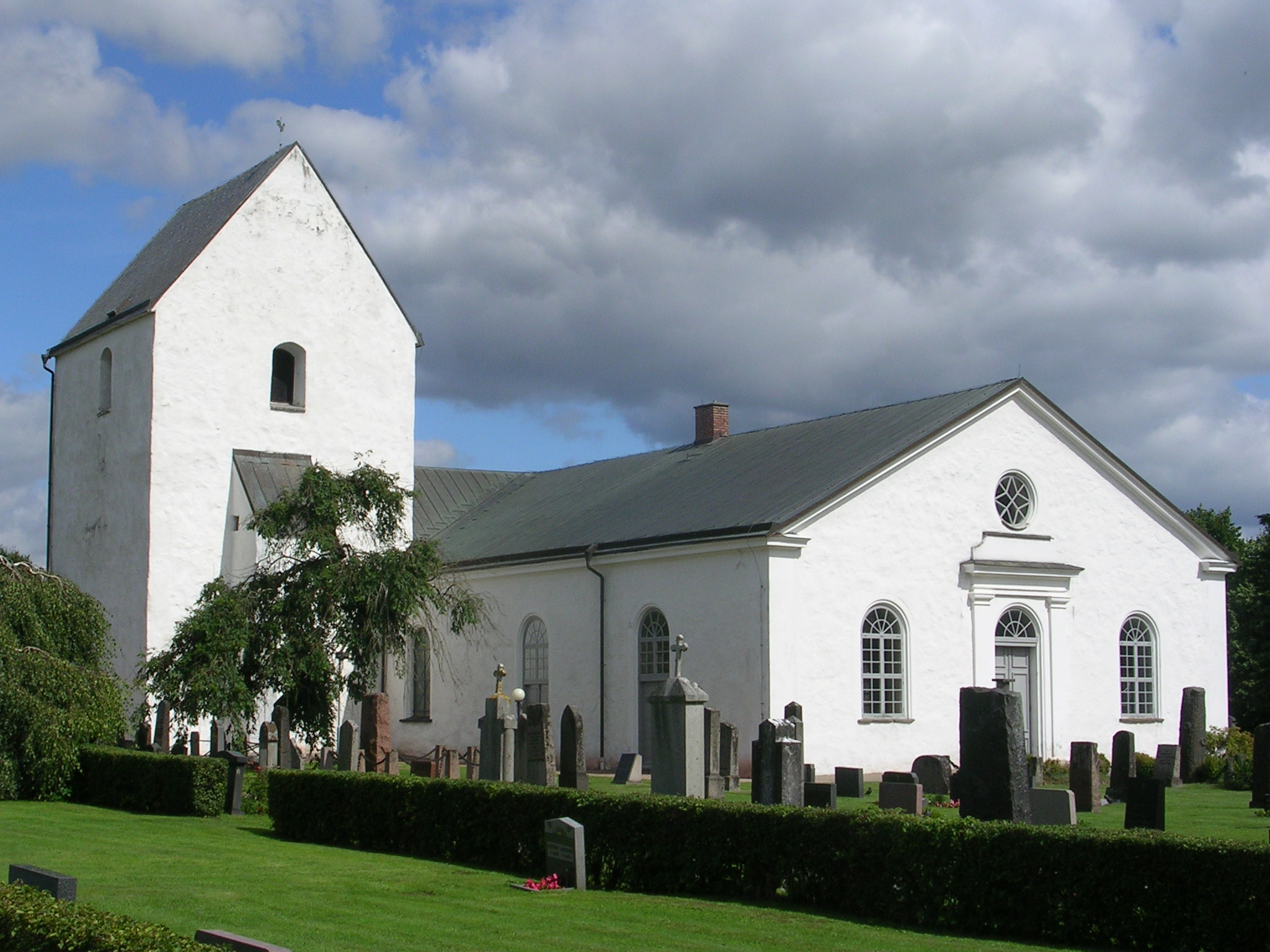
- Önnestad Church

- Location within Skåne Location within Sweden
- Coordinates: 56°03′N 14°01′E
- Country: Sweden
- Province: Skåne
- County: Skåne County
- Municipality: Kristianstad Municipality

Area
  - Total: 1.77 km^{2} (0.68 sq mi)

Population (31 December 2010)
  - Total: 1,378
  - Density: 779/km^{2} (2,020/sq mi)
- Time zone: UTC+1 (CET)
  - Summer (DST): UTC+2 (CEST)

Önnestad is a locality situated in Kristianstad Municipality, Skåne County, Sweden with 1,378 inhabitants in 2010.

Anna Åfelt, one of the first Swedish women to be qualified as a public school teacher, taught in Önnestad from 1837 to 1874.
