= Consulate General of Sweden, Montreal =

Diplomatic mission of Sweden in Montreal from 1906 to 1993

- Location: Montreal
- Address: 800 Victoria Square, Suite 3500 (Note: The address of today's honorary consulate which opened in 1993 after the consulate general closed.); P.O. Box 242, Montreal; QC H4Z 1E9; Canada
- Coordinates: 45.50069°N 73.56200°W
- Opening: 26 October 1906 (Note: The consulate general traces its origins to the consulate which was opened on 26 October 1906 which became a consulate general in 1916.)
- Closed: 1 July 1993
- Jurisdiction: Consular district below

The Consulate General of Sweden, Montreal was the diplomatic mission of Sweden in Montreal between 1916 and 1993. The consulate general originated from the consulate opened in 1906, which was converted into a consulate general in 1916. The consulate general tasks was to advance the interests of Sweden, and to serve and protect Swedes in Montreal and in different provinces and territories of Canada. Along with those in Chicago, Houston, Minneapolis, New York City, and San Francisco, the consulate general belonged to the so-called "heritage consulates" due to the large number of inheritance cases it handled.

Its consular district comprised the whole of Canada until 1983. Between 1983 and 1991, divisions of the district occurred between the Swedish consulate general in Montreal, the consulate general in Toronto, and the consulate in Vancouver. From 1991 until its closure in 1993, the district consisted of Montreal and Quebec, New Brunswick, Newfoundland, Nova Scotia, and Prince Edward Island. The consulate general in Montreal closed in 1993, and since then, a Swedish honorary consulate has been operating in the city.

== History ==
=== Consulate ===
The consulate was established by decision on 26 October 1906, with a consular district covering British North America excluding British Columbia. By decision of the Riksdag of 1912, a salary from an additional allocation for the consul in Montreal was established, and the Riksdag of 1913 approved King in Council's proposition regarding the establishment of this consulate on regular terms (salary 19,000 kronor). In this context, the consul was also given precedence over the consul in Victoria, British Columbia, so that the former's district would henceforth encompass all of Canada (including British Columbia). In December 1915, the King in Council appointed and commissioned the former Cabinet Minister, Consul General in availability, Ph.D. David Bergström, as consul in Montreal from 1 January 1916, and also appointed Consul General Bergström to be Consul General in British North America. In December 1915, the King in Council appointed and commissioned former cabinet minister Dr. David Bergström as Consul in Montreal, effective 1 January 1916, and concurrently appointed Consul Bergström to serve as Consul General in British North America.

=== Consulate general ===
In the beginning of 1916, the Committee of Supply approved the King in Council's proposal to replace the consulate in Montreal with a consulate general, and an annual salary of 26,000 kronor. Fredrik Vilhelm Thorsson and August Sävström, among others, opposed this and proposed rejection. In the first chamber, Mr. Lindblad from Gothenburg opposed the proposal and reminded that the consulate in Montreal had been built with regular state funds in 1913. Even though the consulate had received more work due to increased emigration to Canada, it was not considered necessary to elevate it to a consulate general, especially just before the Riksdag was to convene. Herman Kvarnzelius from the committee assured that they had thoroughly investigated the matter and found that a consulate general in Montreal was justified, considering its extensive workload and the importance of promoting trade and industry. However, Thorsson argued that Sweden's interests would be better served with an additional consulate in Canada and deemed it premature to increase expenditures for consular purposes in Montreal, especially considering the increase that had already occurred from 19,000 to 37,000 SEK. Foreign Minister Knut Agathon Wallenberg explained the need for a consulate in Montreal and emphasized the country's significance for trade relations. He believed that the proposed salary was necessary to ensure a competent representative in Canada. He also defended the proposal to elevate the consulate to a consulate general citing its increased influence and capacity to do more than a regular consulate. Despite objections from several members, the chamber eventually approved the committee's proposal. On 29 February 1916, the Foreign Office in London approved of David Bergström as Consul of Sweden at Montreal for British North America with the exception of British Columbia, and Consul-General for British North America.

In the 1943 American Investigation (Amerikautredningen), a preliminary report aimed to strengthen and streamline Swedish diplomatic representation and information activities in North and South America. Considering Canada's growing importance, they proposed that the existing consulate general in Montreal was inadequate and that a diplomatic mission should be established in Ottawa. It was suggested that the envoy would also serve as consul general in Montreal. To support this representation, the King in Council's proposition to the Riksdag suggested placing two mid-level officials at the mission, one to handle commercial matters and the other for general affairs, especially probate matters. Despite the need for expanded consular representation, experts did not propose establishing new consulates in Canada at present, but they suggested that the proposed trade attaché in San Francisco should also focus on Swedish interests on the Canadian West Coast. Since Canada's political and commercial significance had increased significantly, it was proposed that Swedish representation in the country should have a diplomatic character. They noted that many non-British countries had already established missions in Ottawa, and they also highlighted the significant Swedish population in Canada as further justification for strengthening Swedish representation. To bolster the staff, they proposed appointing a higher-ranking legation secretary. In August 1943, the Swedish government decided to establish a mission in Ottawa and close the consulate general in Montreal. Per Wijkman, the consul general in Montreal, was appointed as envoy to Ottawa.

In 1949, a legation office was established in Montreal under the jurisdiction of the legation in Ottawa. The chancery lasted until 1953, when the consulate general was re-established.

=== Closure ===
In December 1992, it was announced that a number of Swedish embassies and consulates would be closed. The decision was to be made as part of the state budget presented on 11 January 1993. For Canada, this meant that the consulate general in Montreal (with two Ministry for Foreign Affairs employees) and in Toronto (with three diplomatic staff) would be closed. During the budget year 1993/94, the consulate general in Montreal, like many other public sectors, faced extensive cost-cutting measures and rationalizations. Achieving a smaller but more efficient administration required not only general thriftiness but also structural changes. In order to reduce costs and improve efficiency, the Swedish government proposed replacing ten diplomatic missions with alternative representations starting from 1 July 1993, including the consulate general in Montreal, which would be converted into an honorary consulate or consulate general. These measures aimed to reduce costs by replacing career consulates and embassies with cheaper alternatives while simultaneously enhancing coordination between the Ministry for Foreign Affairs in Stockholm and its diplomatic missions with fixed representation.

== Tasks ==
The consulate, along with those in Chicago, Houston, Minneapolis, New York City, and San Francisco, belonged to the so-called heritage consulates due to the large number of inheritance cases the consulate handled. Legal advisors were attached to them, and they handled, among other things, inheritance cases.

During the tenure of the consulate general, there were subordinate consulates: Calgary, Chatham, Dawson City, Edmonton, Hamilton, Halifax, Kenora, Newcastle, Newfoundland, Port Arthur, Quebec City, Saint John, Sydney, Toronto, Vancouver, Victoria, and Winnipeg.

== District ==
The consular district until 1983 encompassed the whole of Canada. In 1983, the Swedish consulate in Vancouver opened, and from the following year, the consulate took over the provinces of Alberta, British Columbia, and Saskatchewan, as well as the territory of Yukon, from the consulate general in Montreal. From 1985 to 1990, the district of the consulate general consisted of Montreal, as well as the provinces and territories of Quebec, Manitoba, New Brunswick, Newfoundland, Nova Scotia, Ontario, Prince Edward Island, and the Northwest Territories. From 1991 to 1993, the district consisted of Montreal, Quebec, New Brunswick, Newfoundland, Nova Scotia, and Prince Edward Island. In 1991, the Swedish consulate general in Toronto opened, taking over responsibility for Ontario, Manitoba, Alberta, Saskatchewan, and the Northwest Territories.

== Buildings ==
=== Chancery ===
From at least 1914 to 1915, the chancery was located in the Canadian Express Building at 95 McGill Street, Room 516–517. From 1916 to 1929, the chancery was located in the Drummond Building at 511 Saint Catherine Street West in Downtown Montreal. From 1930 to 1937, the chancery was located at 1117 Saint Catherine Street West in Downtown Montreal. From 1938 to 1943, the chancery was located at 1462 Bishop Street West in Downtown Montreal. At the same address, the embassy office was located in 1949.

From 1950 to 1953, the embassy office was located at Bishop Court Apartments on 1511 Bishop Street. Subsequently, the consulate general's chancery was located at the same address from 1954 to 1959. From 1960 to April 1962, the chancery was located at 2055 Bishop Street. On 1 May 1962, it moved to the newly built CIBC Tower, Suite 800, 1155 Dorchester Boulevard West (renamed René Lévesque Boulevard in 1987) in Downtown Montreal. It remained here for over 30 years until the consulate general closed in 1993.

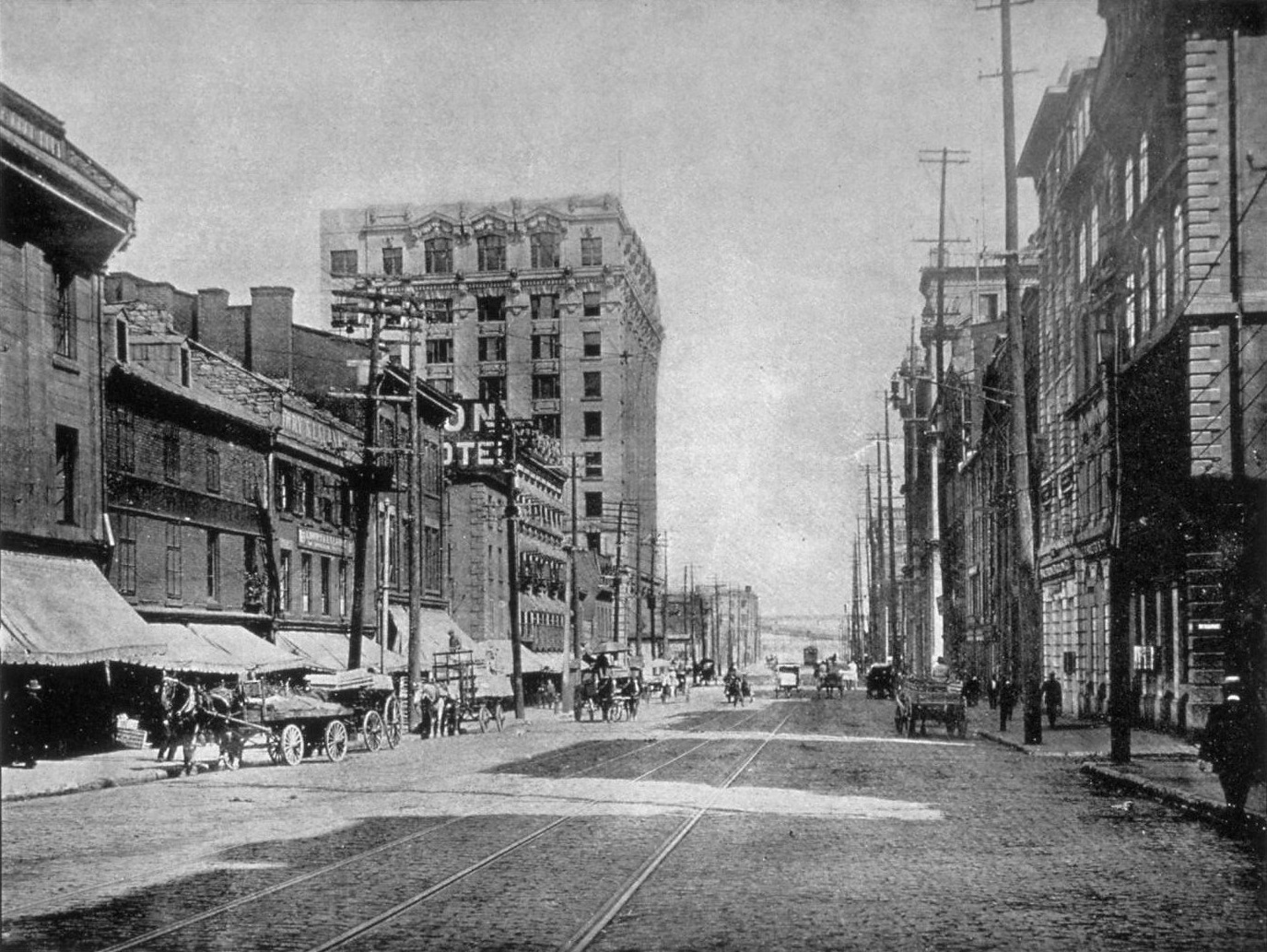
Canadian Express Building, 95 McGill Street
(?–1915)

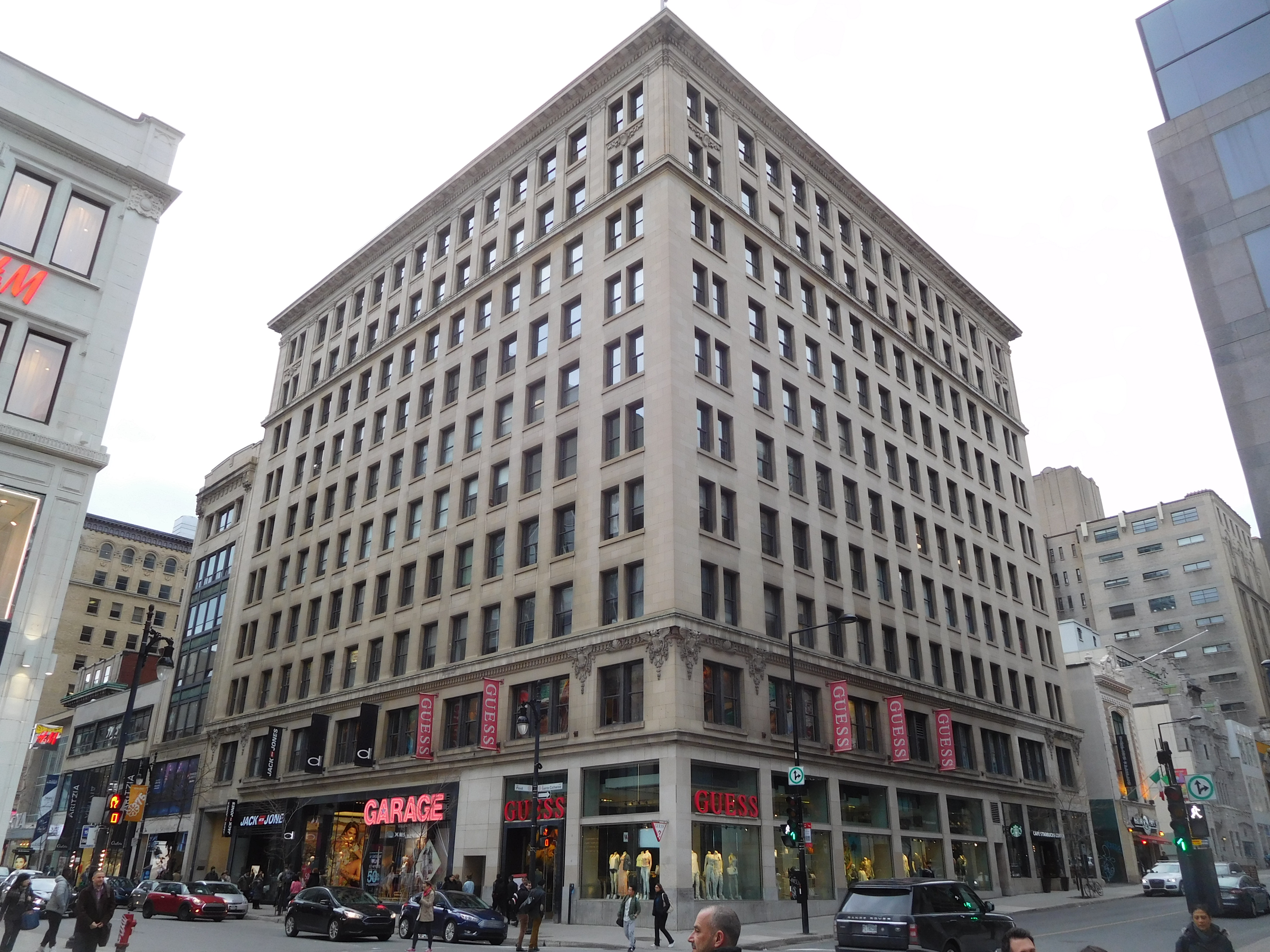
Drummond Building, 511 Saint Catherine Street West (1916–1929)

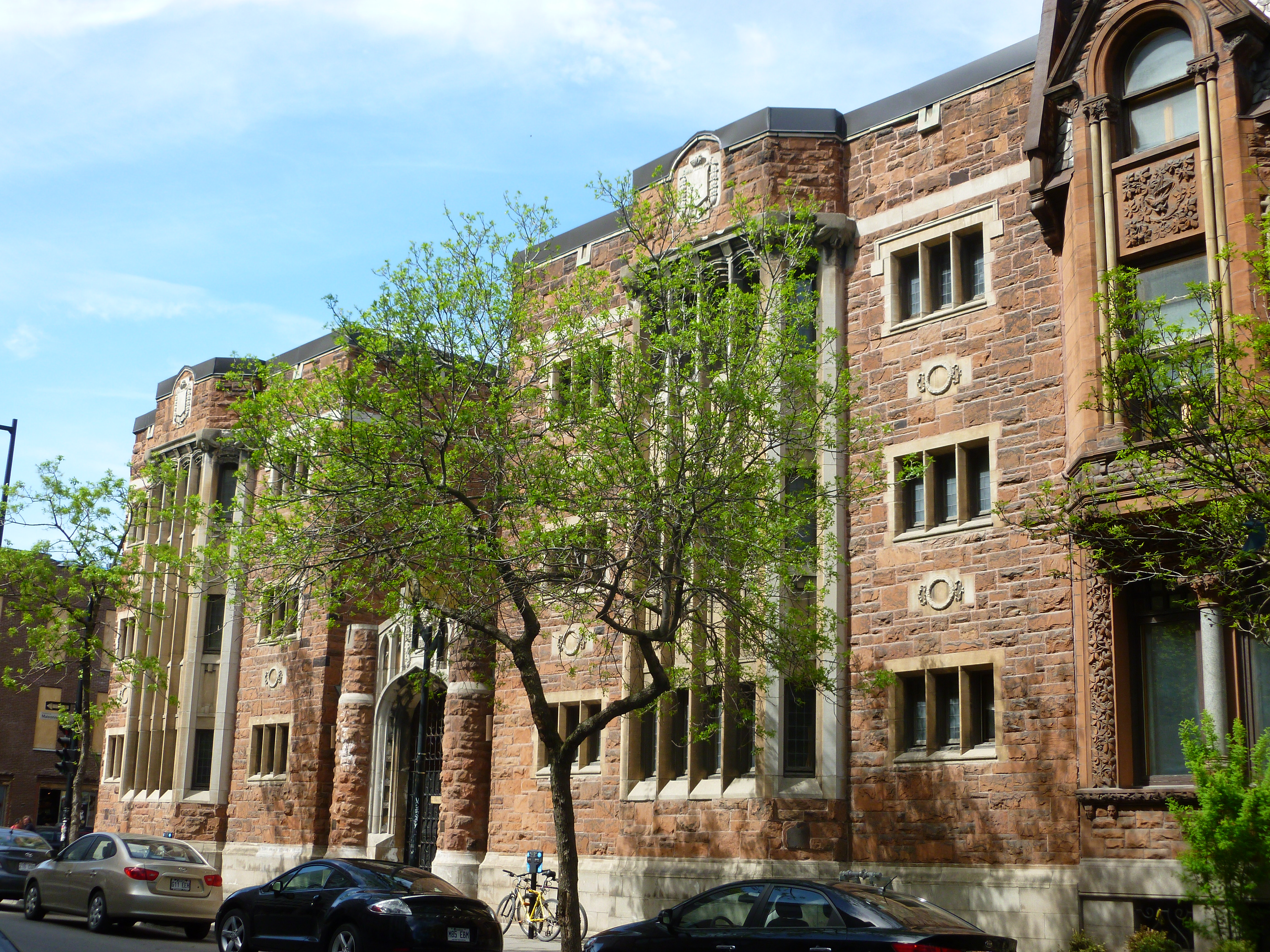
Bishop Court Apartments, 1511 Bishop Street (1950–1953)

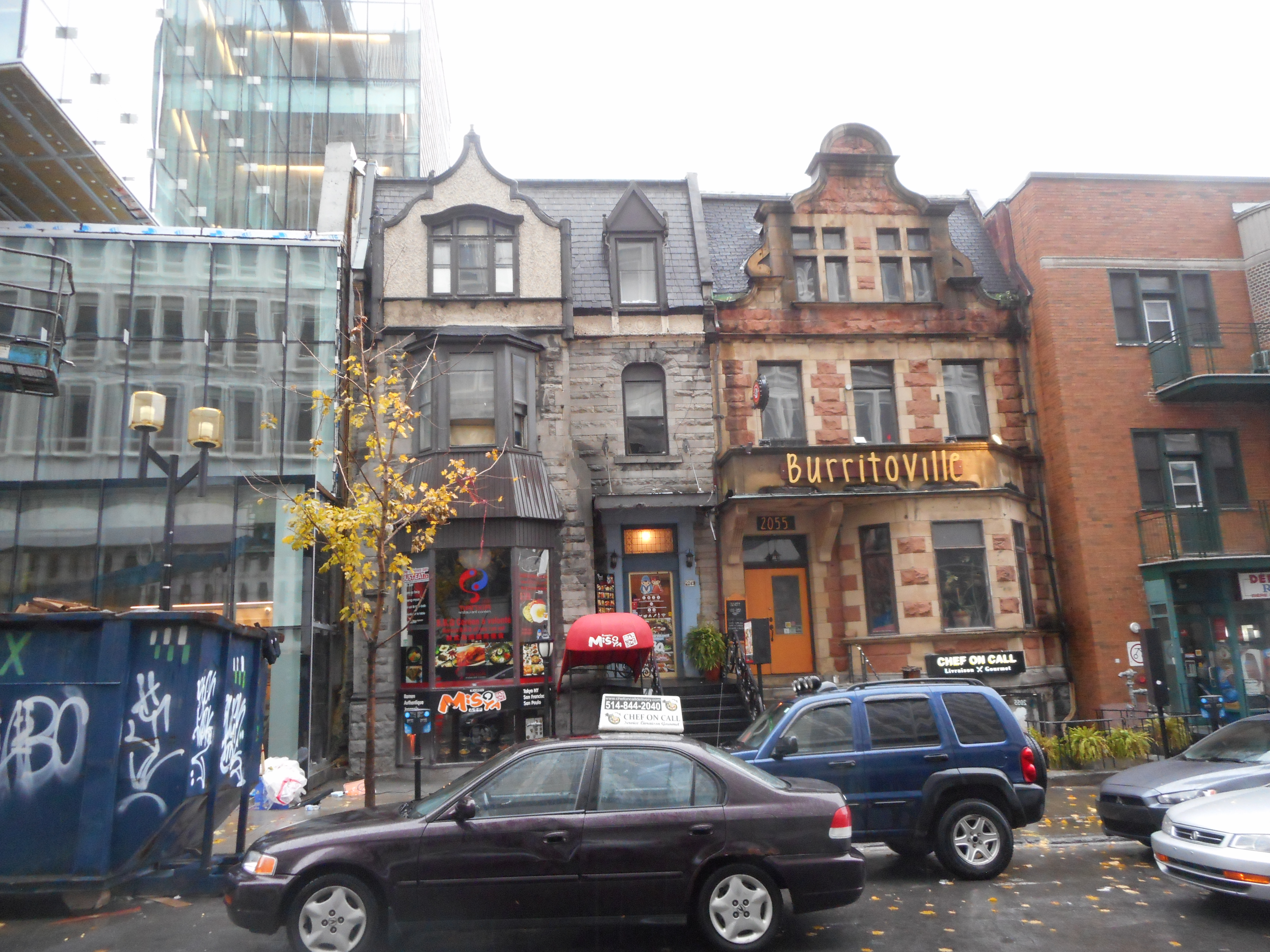
2055 Bishop Street
(1960–1962)

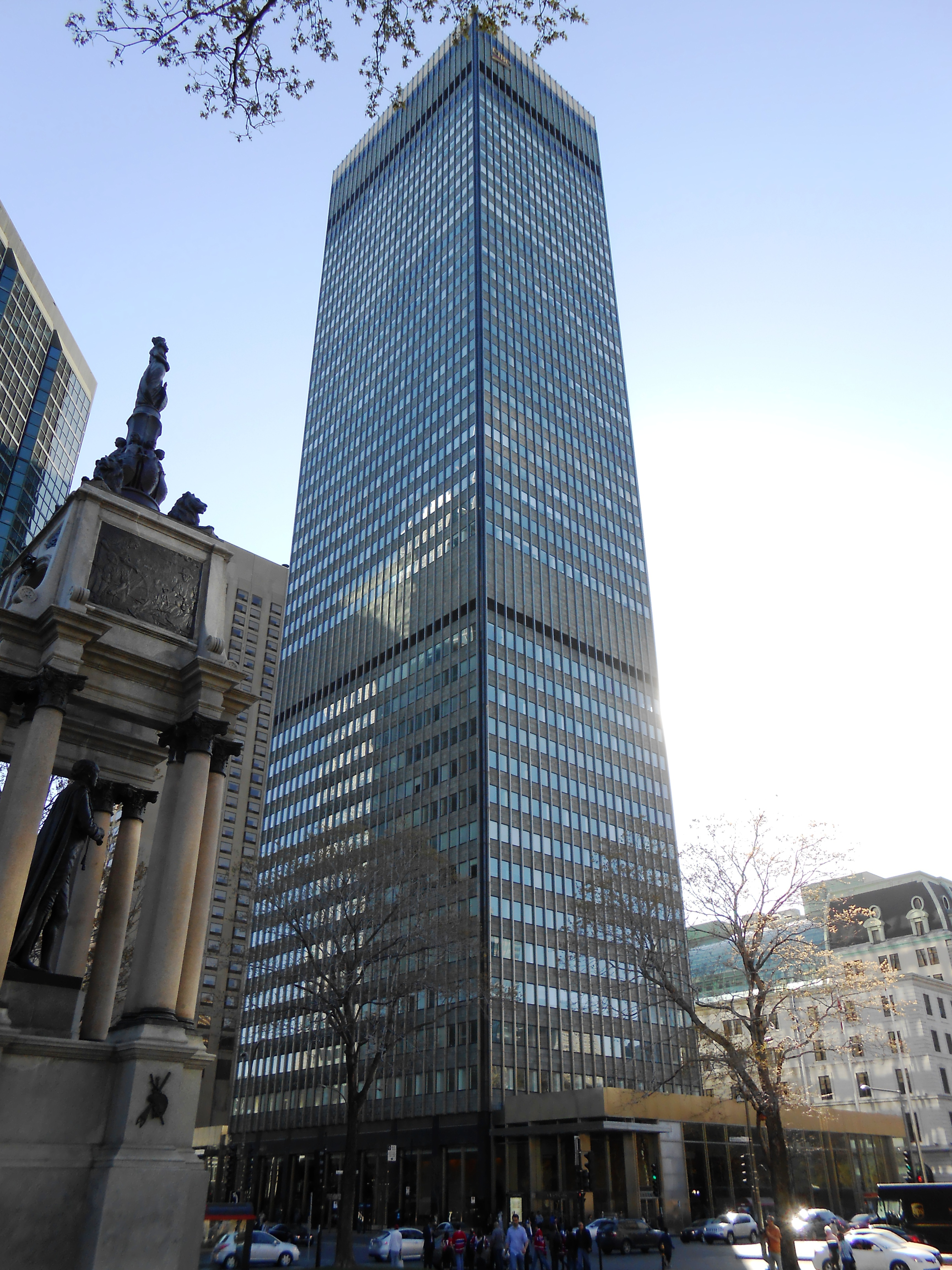
CIBC Tower, 1155 René Lévesque Boulevard
(1962–1993)

=== Residence ===
From at least 1965 to 1966, the consul general's residence was located at 3460 Simpson Street in the Golden Square Mile neighborhood. From 1966 onward, the residence was located at 2801 Hill Park Circle next to Beaver Lake on Mount Royal.

== Heads of Mission ==
| Name | Period | Title | Notes | Ref |
Consulate (1906–1916)
| Gustaf Erik Gylling | 14 December 1906 – 30 October 1908 | Consul | | |
| Hamilton Gault | 30 April 1909 – 10 November 1911 | Honorary consul general | | |
| Einar Henrik Lindquist | 1 July 1911 – 22 November 1912 | Acting consul | | |
| Gylfe Anderberg | 31 December 1913 – 10 December 1915 | Consul | Acting on 22 November 1912. | |
| David Bergström | 10 December 1915 – 18 December 1916 | Consul | Consul in Montreal and acting consul general in British North America. | |
Consulate general (1916–1993)
| David Bergström | 19 December 1916 – 1918 | Consul general | | |
| Carlo von Dardel | 30 August 1918 – 1921 | Acting consul general | | |
| Magnus Clarholm | 1921 – 1 July 1936 | Consul general | | |
| Constans Lundquist | 1936–1939 | Consul general | With jurisdiction in Newfoundland. | |
| Gustaf Löwenhard | 1 January 1940 – 1941 | Consul general | | |
| Hugo Tamm | 1941–1941 | Acting consul general | | |
| Per Wijkman | 1 April 1941 – 1943 | Consul general | | |
| – | 1944–1953 | – | Embassy office in Montreal between 1949 and 1953. | |
| August von Hartmansdorff | 1953–1956 | Acting consul general | | |
| Olof Ripa | 1956–1959 | Consul & acting consul general | | |
| Olof Ripa | 1959–1960 | Consul general | | |
| Ingvar Grauers | 1960–1963 | Acting consul general | | |
| Ingvar Grauers | 1963–1965 | Consul general | | |
| Stig Engfeldt | 1966 – 13 August 1969 | Consul general | Died in office. | |
| Gösta Brunnström | 1969–1972 | Consul general | | |
| Sten Aminoff | 1972–1973 | Acting consul general | | |
| Sten Aminoff | 1973–1974 | Consul general | | |
| Olof Bjurström | 1975–1980 | Consul general | | |
| Claës Erik Winberg | 1980–1985 | Consul general | Also accredited to Nassau, Bahamas from 1981. | |
| Bengt Rösiö | 1985–1990 | Consul general | | |
| Karin Ahrland | 1990–1993 | Consul general | Political appointee (non-career diplomat) | |
Honorary consulate (1993–present)
| Marie Giguere | 1993–1997 | Honorary consul | | |
| Lionel P. Hurtubise | 1997–2002 | Honorary consul | | |
| Daniel Johnson Jr. | 2002–2020 | Honorary consul | | |
| Jocelyn Auger | 2020–present | Honorary consul | | |

== See also ==
- Embassy of Sweden, Ottawa
