= Consulate General of Sweden, Chicago =

Diplomatic mission of Sweden in Chicago, 1943–1993

- Location: Chicago
- Address: 5211 North Clark Street (Note: The address of today's honorary consulate which opened in 1993 after the consulate general closed.); Chicago, IL 60640, USA
- Coordinates: 41.97668°N 87.66824°W
- Opening: 1913 (Note: The consulate general has its origins in the honorary vice consulate which opened in 1852 which became an honorary consulate in 1908, and a consulate in 1913 and a consulate general in 1943.)
- Closed: July 1, 1993
- Jurisdiction: Consular district below

The Consulate General of Sweden, Chicago was the diplomatic mission of Sweden in Chicago between 1943 and 1993. The consulate general originated from the honorary vice consulate opened in 1852, which was converted into an honorary consulate in 1908, and into a consulate in 1913 and finally into a consulate general in 1943. The consulate general tasks was to advance the interests of Sweden, and to serve and protect Swedes in Chicago and different states in the Midwestern United States. Along with those in Minneapolis, New York City, San Francisco, Montreal, and Houston, the consulate general belonged to the so-called "heritage consulates" due to the large number of inheritance cases it handled.

Its consular district initially comprised not only the city of Chicago but also the states of Illinois, Wisconsin, Michigan, Ohio, Indiana, Missouri, and Arkansas but expanded as the Swedish consulates general in Houston and Minneapolis closed. The consulate general in Chicago closed in 1993, and from the same year, a Swedish honorary consulate in Chicago has been operating with an honorary consul as its head.

== History ==
=== Vice consulate ===
As early as 1854, the Scandinavian community in Chicago and its environs had burgeoned to such an extent that it necessitated the establishment of a Swedish-Norwegian vice consulate in the area. The initial appointee to this position was Polycarpus von Schneidau, succeeded in 1856 by his close associate, Pastor Gustaf Unonius of the Ansgarins Church. Upon Pastor Unonius' return to Sweden in 1858, Charles J. Sundell assumed the role of vice consul until 1861, when Oscar Malmborg took over. However, Malmborg's tenure was brief as he was called to serve in the Civil War soon after his appointment. The office was then overseen by Gerhard Larson until 1863. P. L. Hawkinson followed Larson for the subsequent seven years. Peter Svanöe, a Norwegian, succeeded him until 1893, when John R. Lindgren assumed the position. When the union between Sweden and Norway dissolved in 1905, Lindgren continued to act as vice consul for Norway until Fredrik Herman Gade was appointed by the Norwegian government.

=== Consulate ===
The vice consulate was converted into a consulate by decision on August 28, 1908, with a consular district covering the states of Illinois, Wisconsin, Michigan, Ohio, Indiana, Missouri, and Arkansas. After the Swedish government's action to elevate the vice consulate to a consulate, the consulate thereby came into direct connection with the Swedish minister in Washington, D.C.. The vice consulates in seven midwestern states thereafter directly reported to Consul Lindgren instead of Consul Johnson in New York City.

The elevation to consulate took place in December 1908, with Lindgren appointed as consul until January 1914. In February 1909, Henry S. Henschen was appointed vice consul for Sweden, assuming the role of acting consul in May 1909 due to Lindgren's illness, and serving until January 1914. Before 1914, there had been discussions within the Swedish government about appointing a salaried consul of Swedish citizenship, or a consul missus. Particular consideration had been given to the fact that Chicago was considered the center for the inland areas of the United States where Swedes had settled in the largest numbers. It had also been noted the significant importance that a paid Swedish consulate would have considering the multitude of legal issues arising from emigration. When Count Albert Ehrensvärd, who had briefly served as Swedish minister at Washington, D.C., became Foreign Minister in Stockholm, he strongly advocated for the establishment of a salaried consulate in Chicago. This plan was approved by the Swedish Riksdag in the spring of 1913. The first consul under this designation was Carl Gösta Puke, who assumed office in January 1914, marking the conclusion of Lindgren's and Henschen's terms. In 1914, G. Bernhard Anderson was appointed an unsalaried vice consul to work alongside Consul Puke.

In the Council on December 10, 1915, the King in Council granted Carl Gösta Puke resignation from January 1, 1916, due to illness. At the same time, the King in Council appointed and commissioned Consul Gylfe Anderberg at the Swedish consulate in Montreal as consul in Chicago from January 1, 1916.

=== Consulate general ===
In 1943, the consulate was elevated to consulate general.

==== Closure ====
In late 1992, multiple Swedish embassies and consulates were slated for closure as part of severe budget cuts, with an announcement on January 11, 1993. The consulate general in Chicago, with three staff members, closed, leaving only New York City and Los Angeles with Swedish consulates general in the United States. This move was a result of the SEK 100 million that the Ministry for Foreign Affairs needed to save during the 1993/94 budget year.

A Member of Parliament from the Liberal People's Party submitted a motion proposing that Sweden should maintain an official representation in Illinois, specifically in Chicago, despite the proposal to close seven consulates general to save money. The arguments for retaining the representation were that Illinois had a large Swedish-American population with historical significance for Swedish emigration and culture. The proposal also addressed plans to celebrate the 150th anniversary of the great Swedish emigration in 1996, emphasizing the importance of maintaining strong transatlantic contacts before and during these events. Although a fully staffed consulate general was not deemed necessary, the importance of having a person with a strong interest and sufficient resources to serve as a vital link between Sweden and Illinois was emphasized. The motion also urged the government to plan for continued presence in Chicago before any decisions regarding the closure of the consulate general were made.

The consulate general was replaced by an honorary consulate general on July 1, 1993.

=== Honorary consulate general ===
In 1993, Sweden made the decision to designate honorary consuls general to manage consulate affairs rather than diplomats. Thomas R. Bolling was selected for Illinois and subsequently reappointed twice. At the time of his initial appointment, he had already served in various roles, including as president of the Mid America Swedish America Trade Association in Chicago, presently recognized as the Swedish-American Chamber of Commerce-Chicago (SACC). Additionally, he played a pivotal role as the founding director of the Swedish-American Chambers of Commerce (SACC-USA) and served as a board director for the Swedish Council of America. Since 2019, the executive director of the Swedish American Museum, Karin Moen Abercrombie, serves as the honorary consul of Sweden in Chicago.

== Tasks ==
One of the most important tasks for the consulate in Chicago was to maintain good contact with the Swedes in Chicago, which hosted more Swedes than any other city in the world apart from Stockholm and Gothenburg. The consulate, along with those in New York City, San Francisco, Montreal, Minneapolis, and Houston, belonged to the so-called heritage consulates due to the large number of inheritance cases the consulate handled.

The work at the consulate in Chicago consisted almost exclusively of handling inheritance cases until the 1940s. The effort to spread awareness about Sweden and Swedish culture, both spiritual and material, came to play a subordinate role until the autumn of 1940 and depended on the personal initiative and workload of the respective consul.

== District ==
When the honorary consulate opened in Chicago in 1908, the consular district included the states of Illinois, Wisconsin, Michigan, Ohio, Indiana, Missouri, and Arkansas. From at least 1969 to 1975, the district, in addition to the city of Chicago, included the states of Illinois, Colorado, Indiana, Iowa, Kansas, Michigan, Missouri, Nebraska, Ohio, and Wyoming. In 1976, responsibility for the states of Arkansas, Kentucky, Oklahoma, and Tennessee was transferred from the Consulate General of Sweden, Houston, which was now vacant. At the same time, the states of Colorado and Wyoming were transferred to Consulate General of Sweden, Minneapolis. This situation persisted until 1978. In 1979, the states of Arkansas and Oklahoma were returned to the Consulate General of Sweden, Houston. In 1982, the Consulate General of Sweden, Houston closed, and from 1983, the Consulate General of Sweden, Chicago also assumed responsibility for the states of Oklahoma and Texas. In 1989, the Consulate General of Sweden, Minneapolis closed, and from 1990, the Consulate General of Sweden, Chicago also assumed responsibility for the states of Minnesota, North Dakota, South Dakota, and Wisconsin until the Consulate General of Sweden, Chicago closed in 1993. From 1994, the Consulate General of Sweden, New York City took over all the states that the Consulate General of Sweden, Chicago had previously been responsible for.

== Buildings ==
=== Chancery ===
From at least 1916, the consulate was located at 108 South Lasalle Street in the Loop community area of Chicago. It remained there until 1923. From May 1, 1923, the address was 1317 North State Street. It stayed there until 1926. In 1927, the consulate moved to 52 East Cedar Street in what later became the Gold Coast Historic District. It remained there until 1931. In 1932, the consulate moved a few streets away to 44 East Bellevue Place in the Gold Coast Historic District. It stayed there until 1944.

In 1945, the consulate general moved into the 333 North Michigan skyscraper on 333 North Michigan Avenue in the Loop community area of Chicago. The consulate general remained at this address for over 40 years. In 1965, it was located in Suite 2121, and from 1966 to 1986 in Suite 2301. In 1987, the consulate general moved to the newly built Crain Communications Building at 150 North Michigan Avenue, Suite 1250, in downtown Chicago. The consulate general remained there until it closed in 1993. The honorary consulate that opened instead has operated at the same address until February 2024 when it moved to 5211 North Clark Street and the Swedish American Museum in the Andersonville Commercial Historic District.

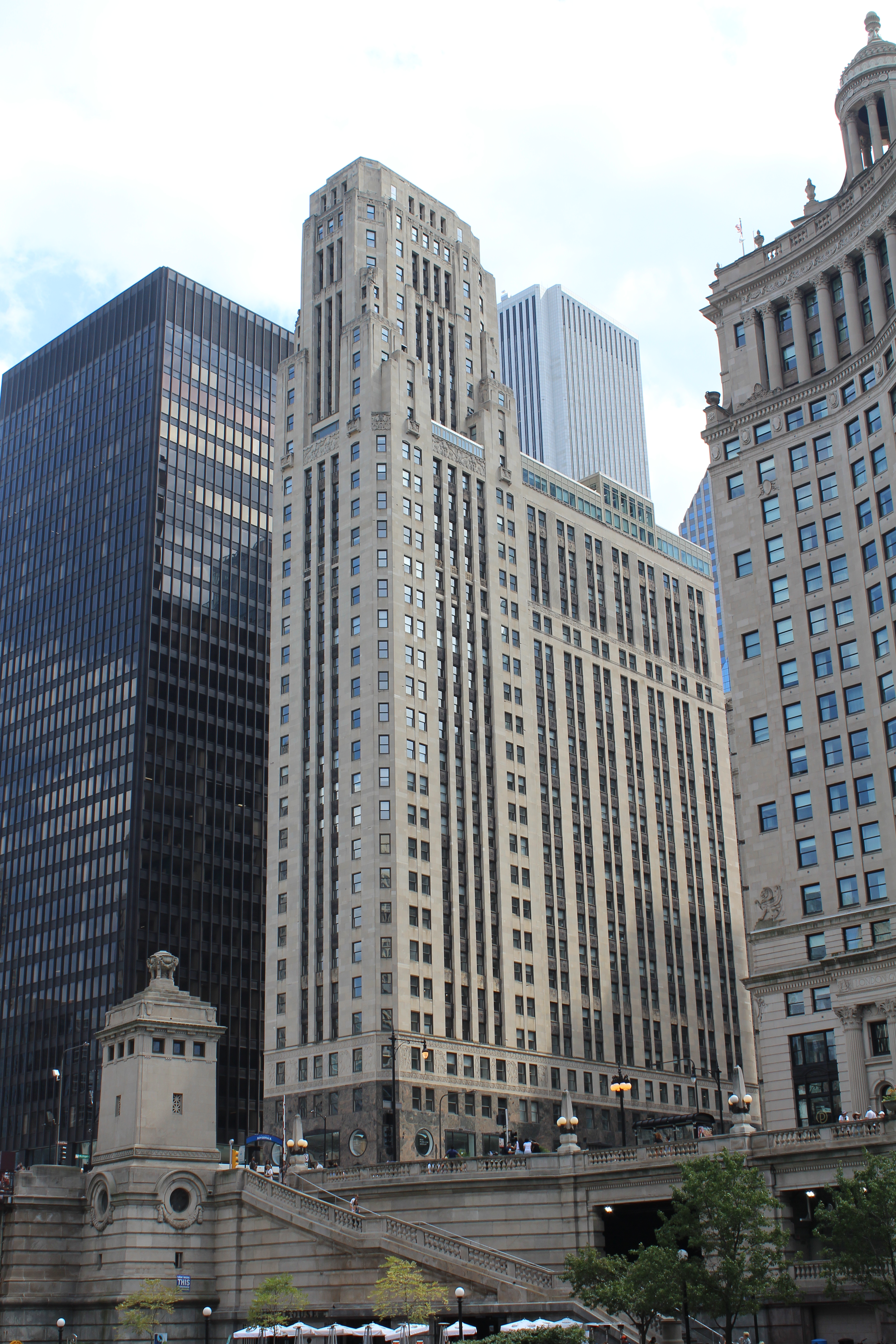
333 North Michigan Avenue
(1945–1986)

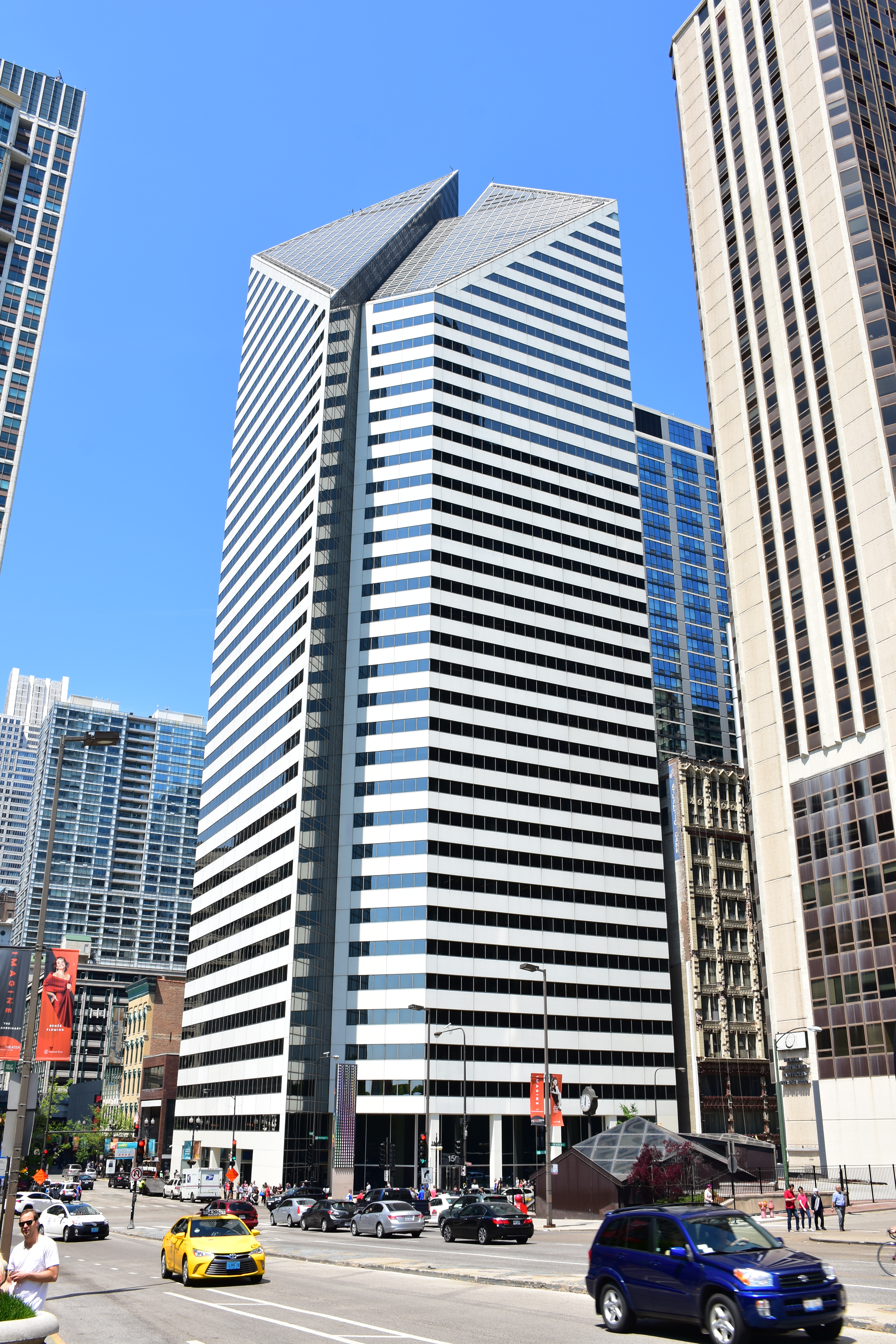
Crain Communications Building, 150 North Michigan Avenue
(1986–1993; 1993–2024)

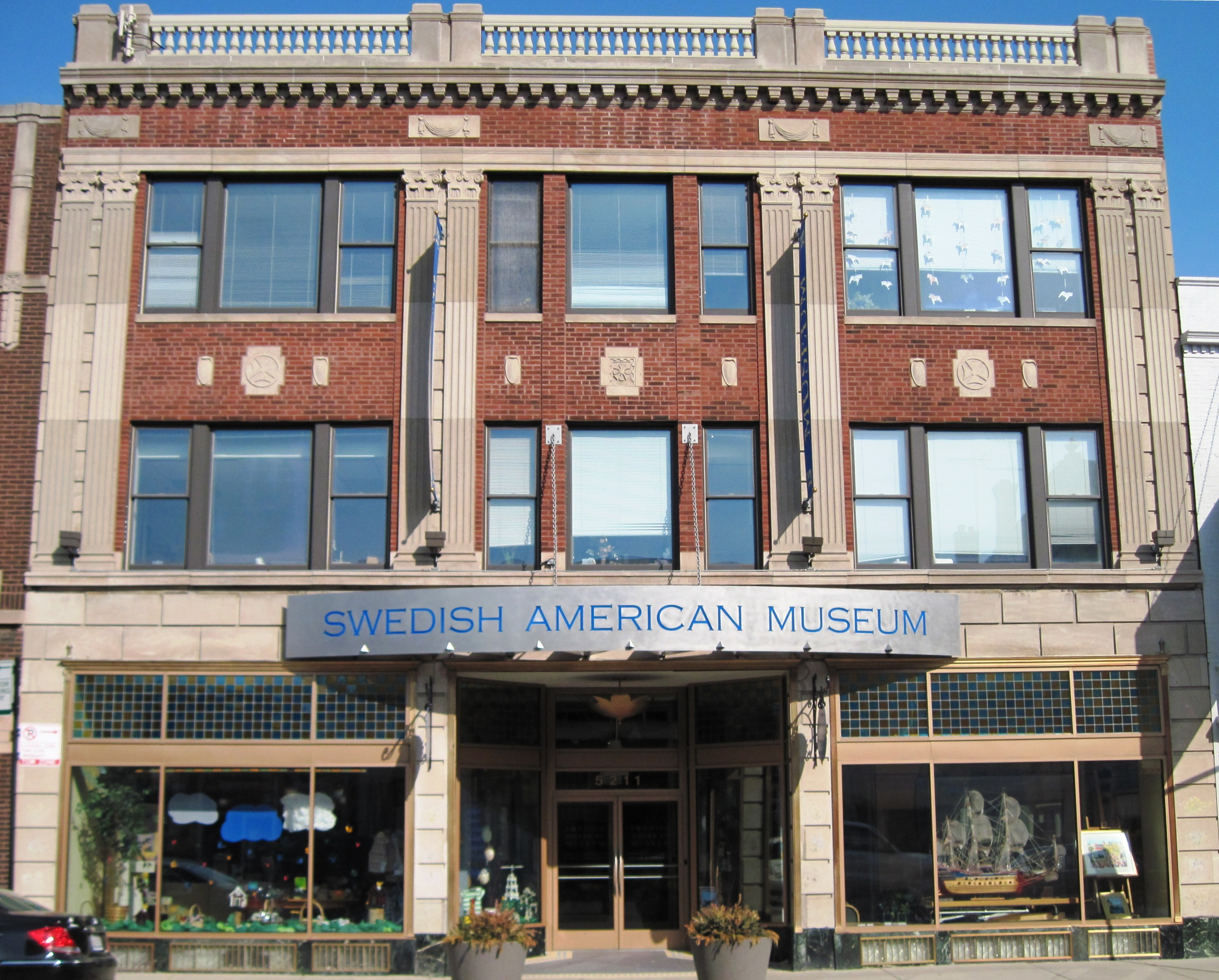
Swedish American Museum, 5211 North Clark Street (2014–present)

=== Residence ===
From at least 1964 to 1965, the consul general's residence was located at Apartment 7D, 3240 North Lake Shore Drive in the Lake View East neighborhood. From 1966 to at least 1968, the residence was located at Apartment 7E, 199 East Lake Shore Drive, in the East Lake Shore Drive District overlooking Lake Michigan.

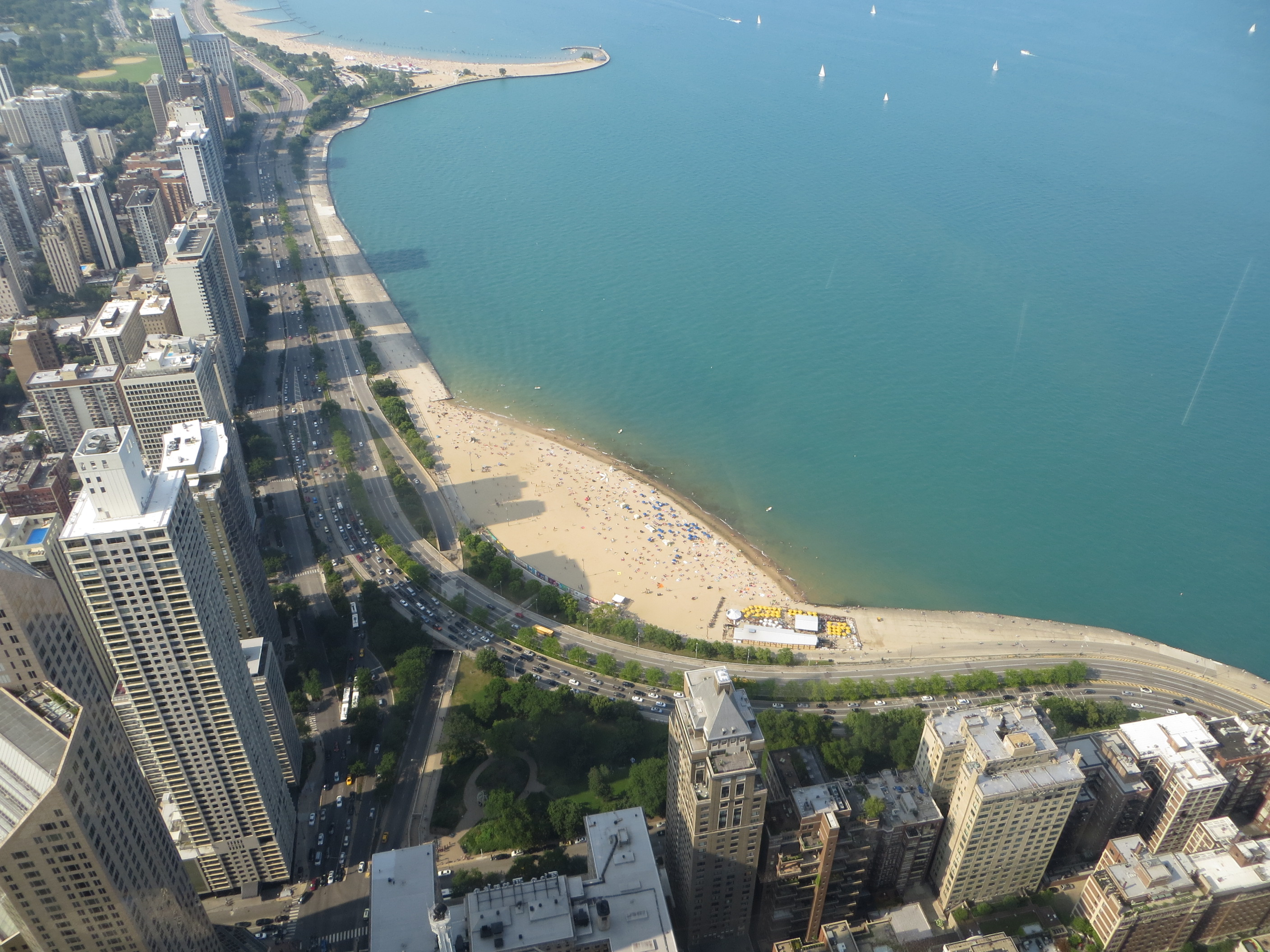
199 East Lake Shore Drive, to the left of the yellow building at the bottom of the image.

== Heads of Mission ==
Name	Period	Title	Notes	Ref
Honorary vice consulate (1852–1908)
Polycarpus von Schneidau	1852–1856	Honorary vice consul		
Gustaf Unonius	1856–1858	Honorary vice consul		
Charles J. Sundell	1858–1861	Honorary vice consul		
Oscar Malmborg	1861–1861	Honorary vice consul		
Gerhard Larson	1861–1863	Honorary vice consul		
P. L. Hawkinson	1863–1870	Honorary vice consul		
Peter Svanöe	1871–1893	Honorary vice consul		
–	1894–1894	–	Vacant	
John R. Lindgren	1894–1908	Honorary vice consul		
Honorary consulate (1908–1913)
John R. Lindgren	August 28, 1908 – 1913	Honorary consul/consul		
Henry Samuel Henschen	May 1909 – January 1914	Acting consul		
Consulate (1913–1943)
Carl Gösta Puke	December 31, 1913 – January 1, 1916	Consul		
Gylfe Anderberg	Januari 1, 1916 – February 1917	Consul		
Claës Bonde	March 3, 1916 – October 15, 1916	Acting consul		
Einar Ekstrand	1917–1917	Acting consul		
Sigurd Theodor Goës	December 21, 1917 – 1921	Consul		
Carlo von Dardel	June 17, 1921 – 1929	Consul		
Constans Lundquist	1929–1936	Consul		
Gösta Oldenburg	1936–1943	Consul		
Consulate general (1943–1993)
Gösta Oldenburg	1943–1944	Acting consul general		
Gösta Oldenburg	1944–1959	Consul general		
Torsten Brandel	1948–1950	Acting consul general		
Bo Järnstedt	1959–1962	Consul general		
Folke Persson	1962–1964	Consul general		
Bo Järnstedt	1964–1973	Consul general		
Karl Henrik Andersson	1973–1976	Consul general		
Tore Högstedt	1976–1980	Consul general		
Arne Thorén	1980–1983	Consul general	Political appointee (non-career diplomat)	
Lars Arnö	1983–1986	Consul general		
Nils-Rune Larsson	1986–1987	Consul general		
Håkan Wilkens	1987–1988	Consul general		
Lave Johnsson	1989–1993	Consul general		
Honorary consulate general/consulate (1993–present)
Thomas R. Bolling	February 15, 1994 – 2003	Honorary consul general		
Kerstin Lane	May 1, 2003 – June 2011	Honorary consul general		
Ulf G. Anvin	November 21, 2011 – 2015	Honorary consul general		
Gerd Sjögren	August 27, 2015 – 2019	Honorary consul general		
Karin Moen Abercrombie	2019–present	Honorary consul		

== See also ==
- Consulate General of Sweden, Houston
- Consulate General of Sweden, New York City
- Consulate General of Sweden, Los Angeles
- Consulate General of Sweden, Minneapolis
- Consulate General of Sweden, San Francisco
