= Consulate General of Sweden, Minneapolis =

Diplomatic mission of Sweden in Minneapolis from 1963-1989

- Location: Minneapolis
- Address: American Swedish Institute; 2600 Park Avenue, Minneapolis; MN 55407, USA (Note: The address of today's honorary consulate which opened in 1989 after the consulate general closed.)
- Coordinates: 44.95481°N 93.26614°W
- Opening: 1920 (Note: The consulate general traces its origins to the honorary consulate which opened on August 28, 1908 which became a vice consulate in 1920, a consulate in 1943, and a consulate general in 1963.)
- Closed: 1989
- Jurisdiction: Consular district below

The Consulate General of Sweden, Minneapolis was the diplomatic mission of Sweden in Minneapolis between 1963 and 1989. The consulate originated from the honorary vice consulate opened in 1908, which was converted into a consulate in 1934 and into a consulate general in 1963. Along with those in New York City, San Francisco, Montreal, Chicago, and Houston, the consulate belonged to the so-called "heritage consulates" due to the large number of inheritance cases it handled.

Its consular district included not only the city of Minneapolis but also the states of Minnesota, Montana, North Dakota, South Dakota, and Wisconsin, and later also the states of Colorado, Wyoming, and New Mexico. The consulate closed in 1989, and from the same year, a Swedish honorary consulate general operates in Minneapolis with an unpaid honorary consul general as its head. Since 2003, the honorary consul general has also served as the CEO and president of the American Swedish Institute.

== History ==
=== 1908–1989 ===
The Consulate General in Minneapolis originated from the honorary vice consulate established on August 28, 1908, with a consular district covering the states of Montana, North Dakota, South Dakota, Minnesota, Iowa, Nebraska, Kansas, Oklahoma, Colorado, Wyoming, and the New Mexico Territory. By decision on December 1, 1911, the consul received an office allocation of SEK 4,000. In December 1919, it was proposed to replace the unpaid vice consulate with a paid consulate. The following year, the honorary vice consulate was upgraded to a vice consulate with a salaried vice consul.

In 1943, the vice consulate was converted into a consulate, and in 1963, into a consulate general. Until 1963, when the consulate was upgraded to a consulate general, it was headed by a salaried consul holding the rank of consul general. The consulate chancery was located in several places in Minneapolis during its existence but for the longest period, over 20 years, in a villa in Lowry Hill where the chief residence was also located. In 1966, the chancery moved to an office building in Central Minneapolis. Throughout the years, inheritance matters primarily occupied the consulate's activities among Swedish Americans active in the Midwest, especially in states like Minnesota, Illinois, and Wisconsin. Inheritance matters decreased every year after Swedish emigration to the United States ceased.

=== Closure ===
In early January 1989, the Carlsson I cabinet warned that five Swedish foreign missions - consulates or consulate generals - would be closed down and converted into unpaid honorary consulates during the year. Among those affected was the consulate general in Minneapolis. On January 20, 1989, Director-General Ulf Larsson presented an investigation into Swedish foreign missions, proposing that the consulate general in Minneapolis be shut down and converted into an unpaid honorary consulate.

The consulate general was closed down according to a decision by the Riksdag on March 15, 1989. Primarily, the Liberal People's Party, including figures like Karl-Göran Biörsmark and Ingemar Eliasson, along with the Centre Party, including individuals like Karin Söder, Pär Granstedt, and Håkan Hansson, argued in vain for the retention of the consulate in Minneapolis, which was now to be replaced by an honorary consulate.

In the motions, it was emphasized that Minnesota, especially Minneapolis, was an important state for Swedish marketing in the United States. The motioners believed that the Swedish government should reconsider the decision to close the Swedish consulate general in Minneapolis for this reason. The Committee on Foreign Affairs understood the motioners' arguments but emphasized that the closure was made for economic reasons and after weighing it against other prioritized tasks for the foreign service. The committee believed that future Swedish representation in Minneapolis, led by an honorary consul general, could continue to support Swedish activities in the United States. Therefore, the motions were rejected.

=== Honorary consulate general ===
A Swedish honorary consulate has been established in Minneapolis since 1989. The first Swedish honorary consul was the former governor of Minnesota, Wendell R. Anderson. The honorary consulate represents the Swedish government in Minnesota, Iowa, North Dakota, South Dakota, and Nebraska, in coordination with the Swedish Embassy in Washington. The consulate's office is situated at the American Swedish Institute in Minneapolis.

In an article published in the Norwegian newspaper Aftenposten in 2007, the head of the Swedish-American Chamber of Commerce, Michael Davis, stated that when Sweden closed its consulate general in Minneapolis in 1989, Sweden as a whole suffered. With each passing year, Sweden gradually lost its connection to important institutions and companies. Most notably, they shifted their attention to Norway, leaving Sweden virtually erased from the map in comparison to Norway.

== Tasks ==
The consulate, along with those in New York City, San Francisco, Montreal, Chicago, and Houston, belonged to the so-called heritage consulates due to the large number of inheritance cases the consulate handled. In 1934, the vice-consulate was converted into a consulate, and in 1963 into a consulate general. During the 1950s, between two and three million kronor were sent home to Sweden from Minnesota every year. This was inheritance from Swedish emigrants that was distributed to Swedish relatives remaining at home, and the amount spoke to the success that Swedish emigrants achieved despite initial difficulties. Inheritance cases were the main task for the Swedish consulate general. In the 1950s, it was reported that the number of inheritance cases decreased each year, although the amounts then remained steady. In the 1920s, the consulate handled 200 inheritance cases per year, and by the 1950s, it was down to 70–80. The reason for this was that emigration had ceased and the generation that might have eligible relatives for inheritance in Sweden began to pass away.

An honorary consulate was opened in 1989 which today provides the following services in Minneapolis: passport delivery, provisional passports for emergency travel, applications for coordination numbers or to retain Swedish citizenship, life certificates, facilitation for Swedish voters, and more.

== District ==
The consular district, at least from 1970, included, in addition to the city of Minneapolis, the states of Minnesota, Montana, North Dakota, South Dakota, and Wisconsin. In 1976, the district was expanded to include the states of Colorado and Wyoming. In 1983, the state of New Mexico was added from the Consulate General of Sweden, Houston, which had been closed the year before. The district remained until the closure of the consulate general in 1989. The states of Colorado, Montana, New Mexico, and Wyoming were taken over by the Consulate General of Sweden, Los Angeles, in 1990.

The Honorary Consulate General of Sweden in Minneapolis, operating since 1989, represents the Swedish government in Minnesota, Iowa, North Dakota, South Dakota, and Nebraska.

== Buildings ==
=== Chancery ===
From April 1925, the vice consulate was located at 1917 Stevens Avenue in the Stevens Square neighborhood. From 1925 to 1927, it was located at the address 906–907 Andrus Building. From 1928 to 1929, the address was 122 South 6th Street in Central Minneapolis. From 1930 to 1931, the consulate was situated at 2216 Irving Avenue South in the East Isles neighborhood.

In 1932, the address was the Posten Building, 502 South 7th Street in the Elliot Park neighborhood. From 1933 to 1934, the address was 1000 West 22nd Street in the Lowry Hill East neighborhood. From 1935 to 1936, the address was 234 West Franklin Avenue in the Stevens Square neighborhood. From 1937 to 1944, the address was 1777 Colfax Avenue South in the Lowry Hill neighborhood.

In a government proposition in 1943, the purchase of a property to house the consulate and the consul's residence was proposed. The proposition highlighted that the consulate's need for adequate premises had significantly increased and that the acquisition of the properties was considered economically advantageous for the Swedish state. The proposal also emphasized the strategic importance of owning properties to strengthen Sweden's representation in the United States.

From 1945 to 1965, the address was 912 Mount Curve Avenue in the Lowry Hill neighborhood. From 1966 to 1971, the address was 1616 Cargill Building, Marquette Avenue and 7th Street in the Downtown West neighborhood. From 1971, the consulate general was located in the 730 Building, Suite 615 at the address 730 2nd Avenue South in the Downtown West neighborhood. Due to a change of name of the 730 Building, the address of the Consulate General from April 1, 1973, was 615 Peavey Building, 730 2nd Avenue South. This was the location of the consulate general until at least 1979.

From 1980 until the consulate general closed in 1989, only a postal address was provided: P.O. Box 2186, Minneapolis, Minn. 55402. Since 1989, there has been a Swedish honorary consulate in Minneapolis located at the American Swedish Institute at 2600 Park Avenue in the Phillips West neighborhood of Minneapolis.

=== Residence ===
During the time the consulate chancery was located at 1777 Colfax Avenue South in the Lowry Hill neighborhood between 1937 and 1944, it also served as the home of the consul and his wife. The same applied after the consulate moved to 912 Mount Curve Avenue in Lowry Hill in 1945. The residence remained in the same building at least until 1968.

== Heads of Mission ==
Name	Period	Title	Notes	Ref
Honorary vice consulate (1908–1920)
Charles Axel Smith	August 28, 1908 – January 24, 1914	Honorary consul		
Carl Edvard Wallerstedt	January 24, 1914 – 1919	Honorary consul		
Vice consulate (1920–1943)
Theophilus Wessén	1919–1924	Acting vice consul		
Nils Jaenson	1924–1931	Vice consul	Consul's exequatur	
Magnus Hallenborg	1931–1934	Vice consul		
Carl Fredrik Hellström	1934–1935	Acting vice consul		
Carl Fredrik Hellström	1935–1940	Vice consul	Consul's exequatur	
Carl Fredrik Hellström	1940–1943	First vice consul	Consul's exequatur	
Consulate (1943–1963)
Carl Fredrik Hellström	1943–1944	Acting consul	Consul General's exequatur	
Carl Fredrik Hellström	1944 – May 31, 1956	Consul	Consul General's exequatur	
Gösta af Petersens	June 1, 1956(59)–1963	Consul/Acting consul general	Consul General's exequatur	
Consulate general (1963–1989)
Olof Landenius	1963–1967	Consul general		
Bengt Odevall	1968–1970	Consul general		
Knut Granstedt	October 29, 1970 – 1973	Consul general		
Per Olof Forshell	1973–1977	Consul general		
Tage Pousette	1977–1982	Consul general		
Karl-Erik Andersson	1982–1989	Consul general		
Honorary consulate general (1989–present)
Wendell R. Anderson	1989–2002	Honorary consul general		
Bruce Karstadt	2003–2023	Honorary consul general		
Molly Wright Steenson	2023–present	Honorary consul general		

== See also ==
- Consulate General of Sweden, Chicago
- Consulate General of Sweden, Houston
- Consulate General of Sweden, New York City
- Consulate General of Sweden, Los Angeles
- Consulate General of Sweden, San Francisco
