= List of diplomatic missions in the San Francisco Bay Area =

Diplomatic missions in The San Francisco Bay area

This is a list of foreign diplomatic missions located in the San Francisco Bay Area in the United States. As of September 2026, the area hosts 43 consulates from 42 countries (Mexico has two). 40 are located in the city of San Francisco; there is one each in Burlingame, Palo Alto, San Jose and Santa Clara.

== Diplomatic mission ==
Country	Mission	Address	City	Neighborhood	Image	Website
Algeria	Consulate-General	465 California Street	San Francisco	Financial District		Link
Australia	Consulate-General	575 Market Street, Suite 1800	San Francisco	Financial District		Link
Austria	Consulate	135 Main Street, Suite 1250	San Francisco	Financial District		Link
Brazil	Consulate-General	300 Montgomery Street, Suite 300	San Francisco	Financial District		Link
Canada	Consulate-General	580 California Street, 14th Floor	San Francisco	Financial District		Link
Chile	Consulate-General	870 Market Street, Suite 1058	San Francisco	Union Square		Link
China	Consulate-General	1450 Laguna Street	San Francisco	Japantown		Link
Colombia	Consulate-General	111 Pine Street, Suite 1400	San Francisco	Financial District		Link
Denmark	Consulate-General	299 California Ave, suite 200, Palo Alto, CA	Palo Alto			Link
El Salvador	Consulate-General	500 Golden Gate Avenue	San Francisco	Civic Center		
France	Consulate-General	44 Montgomery Street, Suite 3400	San Francisco	Financial District		Link
Georgia	Consulate-General	135 Main Street, Suite 800	San Francisco	Financial District		Link
Germany	Consulate-General	1960 Jackson Street	San Francisco	Pacific Heights		Link
Greece	Consulate-General	2441 Gough Street	San Francisco	Pacific Heights		Link
Guatemala	Consulate-General	659 A Merchant Street	San Francisco	Chinatown		Link
Honduras	Consulate-General	1700 California St, Suite 460	San Francisco	Western Addition		
Hungary	Vice-Consulate	5201 Great America Parkway, Suite 320	Santa Clara			Link
India	Consulate-General	540 Arguello Boulevard	San Francisco	Inner Richmond		Link
Indonesia	Consulate-General	1111 Columbus Avenue	San Francisco	North Beach		Link
Ireland	Consulate-General	One Post Street, Suite 2300	San Francisco	Financial District		Link
Israel	Consulate-General	456 Montgomery Street, Suite 2100	San Francisco	Financial District		Link
Italy	Consulate-General	2590 Webster Street	San Francisco	Pacific Heights		Link
Japan	Consulate-General	275 Battery Street, Suite 2100	San Francisco	Financial District		Link
Kazakhstan	Consulate-General	456 Montgomery Street, Unit 950	San Francisco	Financial District		Link
Luxembourg	Consulate-General	1 Sansome Street, Suite 830	San Francisco	Financial District		Link
Mexico	Consulate-General	532 Folsom Street	San Francisco	SOMA		Link
Mexico	Consulate-General	302 Enzo Drive, Suite 200	San Jose			Link
Mongolia	Consulate-General	465 California Street, Suite 200	San Francisco	Financial District		Link
Nepal	Consulate-General	505 Beach Street, Suite 130	San Francisco	Fisherman's Wharf		Link
Netherlands	Consulate-General	120 Kearny Street, Suite 3100	San Francisco	Financial District		Link
Norway	Consulate-General	575 Market Street, Suite 3950	San Francisco	Financial District		Link
Peru	Consulate-General	870 Market Street, Suite 1075	San Francisco	Union Square		Link
Philippines	Consulate-General	447 Sutter Street	San Francisco	Union Square		Link
Portugal	Consulate-General	3298 Washington Street	San Francisco	Pacific Heights		Link
Singapore	Consulate-General	595 Market Street, Suite 2450	San Francisco	Financial District		Link
South Korea	Consulate-General	3500 Clay Street	San Francisco	Presidio Heights		Link
Spain	Consulate-General	1405 Sutter Street	San Francisco	Western Addition		Link
Sweden	Consulate-General	595 Market Street, Suite 1350	San Francisco	Financial District		Link
Switzerland	Consulate-General	200 Vallejo Street	San Francisco	Embarcadero		Link
Tonga	Consulate-General	1350 Bayshore Highway, Suite 610	Burlingame			Link
Ukraine	Consulate-General	530 Bush Street, Suite 402	San Francisco	Union Square		Link
United Kingdom	Consulate-General	1 Sansome Street, Suite 580	San Francisco	Financial District		Link
Uruguay	Consulate-General	111 Pine Street, Suite 1650	San Francisco	Financial District		Link
Vietnam	Consulate-General	1700 California Street, Suite 580	San Francisco	Western Addition		Link

== Other missions ==
Country	Mission	Address	City	Neighborhood	Image	Website
Canada	Trade Office	245 Lytton Avenue, Suite 375	Palo Alto			Link
European Union	Office	One Post Street, Suite 2300	San Francisco	Financial District		Link
Hong Kong	Economic and Trade Office	130 Montgomery Street	San Francisco	Financial District		Link
Taiwan	Taipei Economic and Cultural Office	345 4th Street	San Francisco	SOMA		Link

== Honorary consulates ==
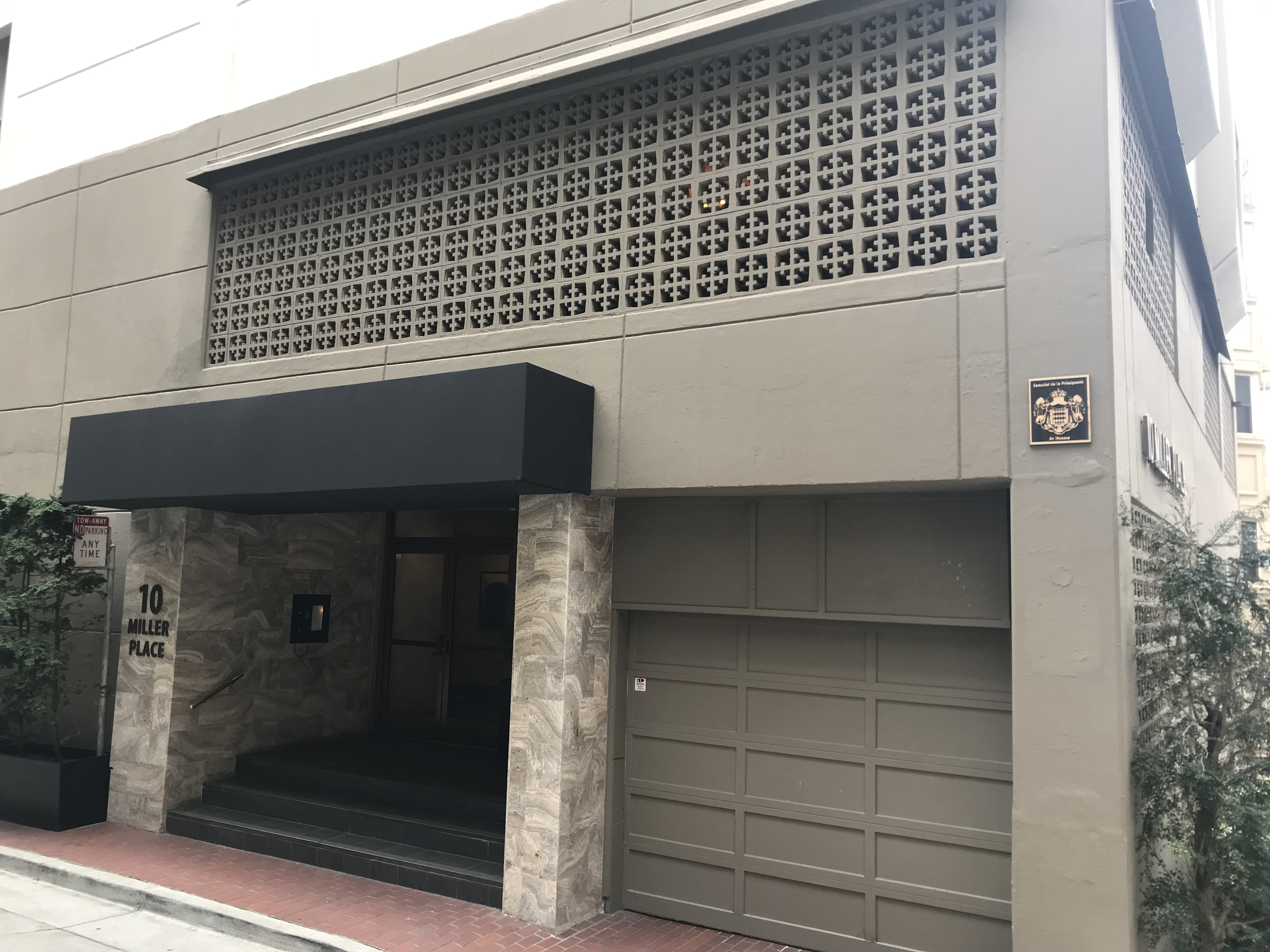
Honorary consulate of Monaco in San Francisco

- Barbados
- Belgium
- Belize
- Botswana
- Cameroon
- Cyprus (Office in Lafayette)
- Czech Republic
- Denmark (Office in Sacramento)
- Fiji (Office in South San Francisco)
- Finland
- Hungary (Office in San Mateo)
- Iceland
- Ivory Coast
- Jamaica (Office in Oakland)
- Jordan
- Latvia (Office in Belvedere)
- Liberia
- Lithuania (Office in San Ramon)
- Malta
- Mauritius
- Monaco
- Namibia (Office in San Jose)
- New Zealand (Offices in Burlingame and El Macero)
- Poland
- Romania
- Seychelles
- Slovakia (Office in Woodside)
- Slovenia
- Tanzania (Office in San Rafael)
- Turkey
- Yemen

== See also ==
- List of diplomatic missions in the United States
