= Wallerstedt =

Wallerstedt is a surname. Notable people with the surname include:

- Carl Edvard Wallerstedt (1882–1963), Swedish diplomat
- Jonas Wallerstedt (born 1978), Swedish soccer player and coach
- Sara Grace Wallerstedt (born 1999), American fashion model
- Brett Wallerstedt (born 1970), American football player
