= Consulate General of Sweden, Houston =

Diplomatic mission of Sweden in Houston

- Location: Houston
- Address: 3040 Post Oak Boulevard; Houston, TX 77056, USA
- Coordinates: 29.73507°N 95.46282°W
- Opening: September 2025 (Note: The Consulate General originated as a consulate inaugurated on May 24, 1950. It was upgraded to a Consulate General in 1963, closed in 1981, and finally reopened in September 2025.)
- Inaugurated: March 17, 2026
- Jurisdiction: Texas
- Consul General: Anna Hammarlund Blixt
- Website: Official website

The Consulate General of Sweden, Houston is the diplomatic mission of Sweden in Houston. The Swedish Consulate General in Houston has a long and varied history, first established in 1950 and later upgraded to a consulate general in 1963. After periods of closure and transformation, the mission was permanently shut down in 1981, followed by decades of activity only through an honorary consulate.

In September 2025, the Consulate General was officially reopened. Today, it is located at 3040 Post Oak Boulevard in the Greater Uptown district of Houston. Its consular district consists solely of the state of Texas, reflecting a more focused jurisdiction compared to its earlier, much larger regional role. The Consulate General's main task is to promote cooperation between Sweden and the United States in trade, investment, and innovation, building stronger economic and business ties between Sweden and Texas.

== History ==
=== Consulate ===
The King in Council decided on November 15, 1949, to establish an honorary consulate in Houston and had prescribed that a position in salary grade Ca 33 within the Swedish foreign service would be temporarily stationed at this consulate. For this purpose, the consul position that was attached to the Consulate General of Sweden, New York City had been temporarily reassigned. As it was desirable for this position to be returned to its regular place of assignment, the minister for foreign affairs appointed that a specific position, such as consul in salary grade Ca 33 stationed in Houston, should be established.

Consul Gunnar Dyrelius, appointed as consul in Houston, emphasized that the establishment of the consulate was a pioneering effort within the Swedish export drive in the United States. The southern part of the southwestern states had not been commercially explored from the Swedish side before. It was understood that there should be no exaggerated hopes of quickly establishing a large market there, but the area had significant potential and was one of the wealthiest parts of the United States. A quarter of all investments in the United States in 1948 were made in Texas. At the establishment of the consulate, it had not yet been determined how large the consular district of the new "export consulate" would encompass, but it was expected to include Texas, New Mexico, Oklahoma, Mississippi, Louisiana, Arkansas, and Alabama, most of which had previously belonged to the district of the Consulate General of Sweden, Chicago.

In May 1950, the consulate moved into its own premises. It was officially inaugurated on May 24. The premises housed a permanent exhibition of Swedish industrial and artisanal products. The consulate was located at 3602 Montrose Boulevard in the Neartown-Montrose area. The premises were exclusively furnished with Swedish office furniture, and the spaces were entirely dedicated to the exhibition of Swedish industrial and artisanal products. The exhibition concept was further developed, and in early June 1950, Consul Gunnar Dryselius traveled to Sweden to establish contacts with companies whose products were expected to gain traction in this vast and largely untapped market for Sweden.

At the inauguration of the consulate, representatives from the city's business and trade community gathered to participate, including Mayor Oscar F. Holcombe and former Secretary of Commerce Jesse H. Jones. Importers from other parts of Texas also attended to explore what Sweden could offer. Nearly 1,000 people participated in the ceremonies, which began with the national anthems of both countries. Consul Gunnar Dryselius expressed hope that the new consulate would serve as a bridge between Sweden and the Southwestern United States, promoting increased trade, tourism, and cultural exchange for the mutual benefit of both countries.

=== Consulate general ===
In 1963, the consulate was elevated to consulate general. When the consulate was upgraded to a consulate general, Consul Karl Henrik Andersson was appointed as the Consul General there.

On July 1, 1971, the consulate general in Houston was transformed into a trade commissioner office. After that, Sweden did not have a Consul General in Houston for the next seven years. During this time, the office was staffed by a vice consul.

=== Final years and closure ===
In 1978, Sweden reestablished the consulate general in Houston due to "the heavy economic decisions that will be made in this region in the future." The year before, the county governor and former leader of the Moderate Party, Yngve Holmberg, was offered the position of Consul General in Houston, despite criticism from the labor organizations of the Ministry for Foreign Affairs, TCO and SACO/SR. They had previously objected to what they called "retreat appointments," where competent Ministry for Foreign Affairs officials were passed over in the promotion process when ambassadorial positions were given to former parliamentarians instead of those trained by the Ministry for Foreign Affairs. On December 1, 1977, Holmberg was appointed as the new Consul General. He commenced his duties on January 1, 1978. In September 1980, it was reported that Chancellor of Justice Bengt Hamdahl had initiated a preliminary investigation into Holmberg's actions as head of the Swedish Consulate General in Houston. Earlier that year, staff at the consulate general had requested the Ministry for Foreign Affairs to intervene to address certain collaboration issues. The Chancellor of Justice announced that Holmberg was suspected of having acted criminally in two instances. In one case, it was related to allegedly receiving "improper remuneration in the exercise of his duties." In the other case, he was suspected of having requested such remuneration. At the end of November 1980, the Chancellor of Justice announced that Holmberg would be prosecuted for bribery. Pending the trial, Holmberg's duties were relocated to the Ministry for Foreign Affairs administration in Stockholm. No substitute for Holmberg was appointed in Houston. In September 1980, it was reported that the consulate general would remain operational despite the absence of a Consul General, but with reduced staffing, primarily focusing on the offshore and shipbuilding industries.

On February 13, 1981, Holmberg was convicted in Stockholm District Court for bribery and was sentenced to a conditional sentence combined with 90 day-fines of 90 SEK each, and 5,000 SEK in legal costs. Three months later, in May 1981, Holmberg requested to resign from his position in Houston, which the Swedish government granted. He was then given three months to wind down the operations. Holmberg was placed on leave by the government as of August 1, 1981. On the same date, the consulate general was closed.

=== Honorary consulate general ===
In 1983, Sweden instead opened an honorary consulate general in Bellaire, Texas, with attorney Jeffrey B. Love serving as the honorary consul general. Since the 1980s, the honorary consulate general had been located in several places in Greater Houston. Its final location, before closing in 2025, was at the same address as the Swedish-American Chamber of Commerce Texas (SACC-Texas) in Houston.

In December 2007, the Swedish government rescinded the 2004 decision to establish a consulate general in Houston. The 2004 decision had never been implemented due to a lack of resources.

=== Reopening ===
The Swedish government announced in February 2025 that it intends to reopen the consulate general. It will focus on promoting cooperation between the countries in trade, investment and innovation.

The Swedish Consulate General began operations in September 2025, but was officially inaugurated on March 17, 2026 by Victoria, Crown Princess of Sweden and Minister of Foreign Affairs Maria Malmer Stenergard.

== Tasks ==
The consulate, along with those in New York City, San Francisco, Montreal, Minneapolis, and Houston, belonged to the so-called heritage consulates due to the large number of inheritance cases the consulate handled. During the 1980s, the consulate general primarily focused on the offshore and shipbuilding industries.

Since the Consulate General reopened in 2025, its main task has been to promote cooperation between the two countries in trade, investment, and innovation.

== District ==
From 1949, the consular district encompassed Houston and the states of Texas, Alabama, Arkansas, Louisiana, Mississippi, New Mexico, Oklahoma, as well as the Florida panhandle. This district lasted until 1975. From 1976 to 1978, the district only included Houston and Texas and from 1976, Alabama, Louisiana, Mississippi, and Texas belonged to the Consulate General of Sweden, New York City. The states of Kentucky and Tennessee were transferred to the Consulate General of Sweden, Chicago. In 1979, these states reverted to the jurisdiction of the consulate general in Houston when it was reestablished. The district remained the same until 1981 when the consulate general was closed. From when the honorary consulate general opened in 1983 until at least 1988, the district consisted of Texas except for the city of Dallas. In 2024, the district consisted of Houston, South Texas, Oklahoma, and Arkansas. Since the Consulate General reopened in 2025, its district has consisted of the state of Texas.

== Buildings ==
=== Chancery ===
The chancery was located in the Commerce Building, Houston, in 1950 before moving to 3602 Montrose Boulevard in the Neartown-Montrose area in the same year. It remained here until 1954. From 1955, the address was a couple of hundred meters away at 3400 Montrose Boulevard in an office building. At least from 1964 to 1967, it was located in Suite 803 at the same address. The consulate remained at 3400 Montrose Boulevard until 1971/72 when it was converted into a trade commissioner office. From 1973 to 1975, the address was 4600 Post Oak Place Drive, Suite 100, in the Afton Oaks / River Oaks area. Thereafter, it was only listed as P.O. Box 27459, Houston, Texas 77027, between 1976 and 1979. From 1980 until the closure of the consulate general in 1981, it was located at 17 South Briar Hollow Lane, Suite 400, around the corner from the consulate general's previous address in Afton Oaks / River Oaks.

From 1983, the honorary consulate general was located in the same place as the Chamber of Commerce of Greater Bellaire, at 6900 South Rice Avenue in Bellaire, Texas. From at least 1985 to at least 1988, it was located at the law firm of Liddell, Sapp, Zivley, Brown & LaBoon's office on the 34th floor of the Texas Commerce Towers. From at least 1990 to 1993, it was located in the NCNB Bank Building, 5123 Bellaire Boulevard in Bellaire, Texas. From 1994 to at least 1999, it was located at 2401 Fountainview Drive, Suite 510, in the Greater Uptown district of Houston. From at least 2005 to 2012, it was located at 2909 Hillcroft Street, Suite 515, in the Mid West neighborhood of Houston. During the summer of 2012, it moved to River Oaks Tower at 3730 Kirby Drive, Suite 805, in the Greenway / Upper Kirby area. It remained there until at least 2016. It later moved to 1775 Saint James Place, Suite 105, in the Greater Uptown district of Houston.

Since the Consulate General reopened in 2025, it has been located at 3040 Post Oak Boulevard in the Greater Uptown district of Houston.

=== Residence ===
From at least 1964 to 1968, the consul general's residence was located at 4640 Bryn Mawr Lane in the Afton Oaks neighborhood of Houston.

== Heads of Mission ==
Name	Period	Title	Notes	Ref
Consulate (1950–1963)
Gunnar Dryselius	November 1949 – 1957	Consul	Consul General's exequatur from 1953.	
Louis De Geer	February 1958 – 1958	Acting consul		
Karl Henrik Andersson	1958 – June 28, 1963	Consul		
Consulate general (1963–1981)
Karl Henrik Andersson	June 28, 1963 – 1963	Consul general		
Tore Högstedt	1964–1969	Consul general		
Bengt Rösiö	1969–1971	Consul general		
–	1971–1977	–	Vacant	
Yngve Holmberg	March 3, 1978 – August 1, 1981	Consul general	Political appointee (non-career diplomat)	
Honorary consulate general (1982–2025)
–	1982–1982	Honorary consul general	Vacant	
Jeffrey B. Love	April 29, 1983 – 1988	Honorary consul general		
Robert A. Fowler	September 19, 1989 – 1998	Honorary consul general		
Jan Dryselius	June 29, 1993 – November 6, 2008	Honorary consul		
Jan Dryselius	November 7, 2008 – August 2012	Honorary consul general		
Astrid Marklund	August 15, 2012 – 2023	Honorary consul general		
Annika Bergman	June 2023 – August 15, 2025	Honorary consul		
Consulate general (2025–present)
Anna Hammarlund Blixt	2025–present	Consul general		

== See also ==
- Consulate General of Sweden, Chicago
- Consulate General of Sweden, New York City
- Consulate General of Sweden, Los Angeles
- Consulate General of Sweden, Minneapolis
- Consulate General of Sweden, San Francisco
