= Molly Wright Steenson =

American professor of design

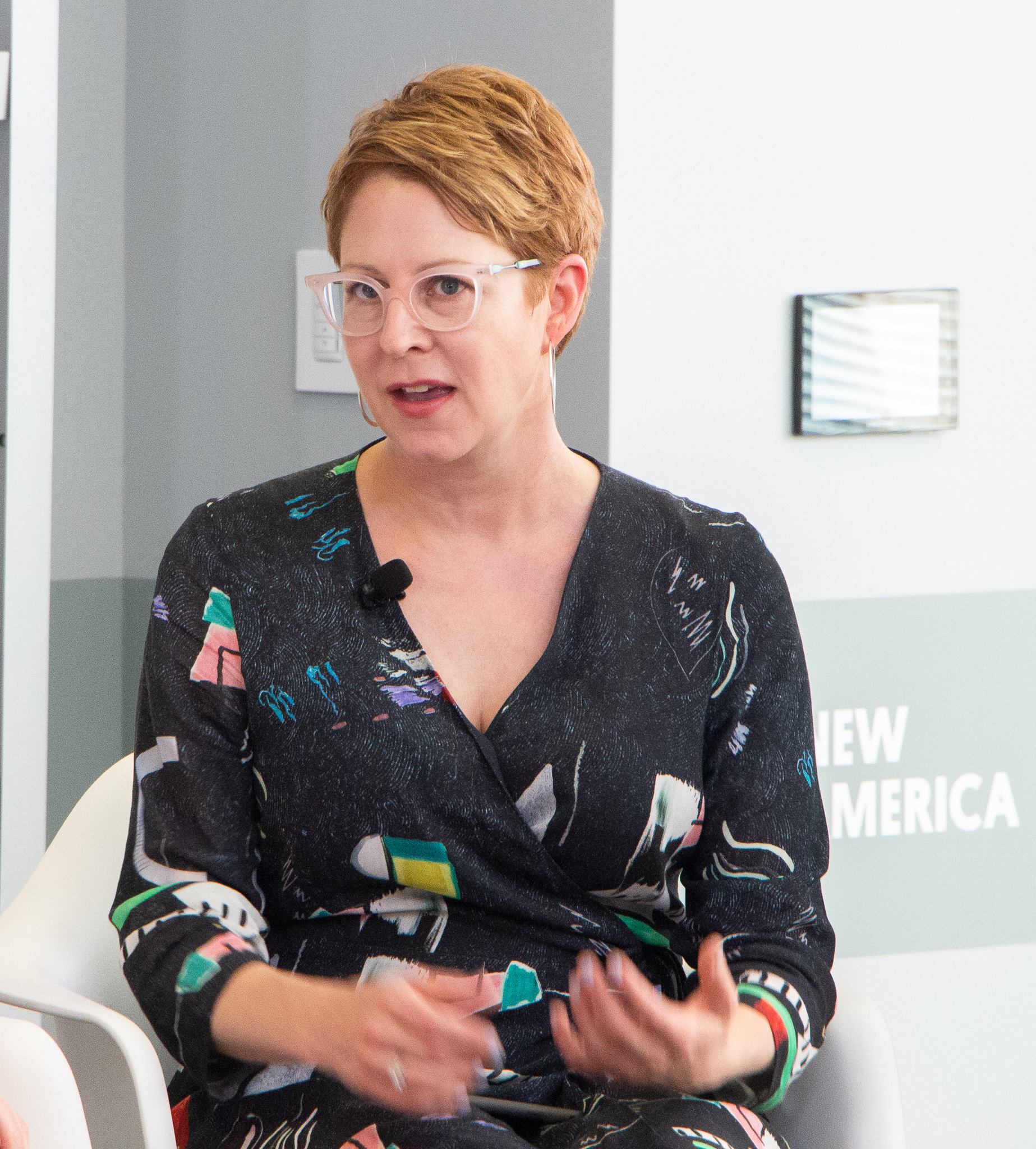
- Steenson in 2019
- Occupation(s): professor, historian

Molly Wright Steenson (born 1971) is an American professor of design and a historian of architecture and technology. Currently, Molly is the president and CEO of the American Swedish Institute. Previously, she was the Carnegie Mellon University Vice Provost for Faculty, K&L Gates Associate Professor of Ethics and Computational Technologies, and Senior Associate Dean for Research in the College of Fine Arts at Carnegie Mellon University.

== Life and career ==
Steenson is a historian of design, architecture, and the history of those concepts alongside cybernetics and artificial intelligence. Her current research focuses on the idea of artificial intelligence and how it's viewed and portrayed in contemporary media and culture. She argues that our ideas of artificial intelligence are outdated and this inhibits peoples' ability to understand what it really is. Her book Architectural Intelligence: How Designers & Architects Created the Digital Landscape, published with Graham Foundation support, combines "an architectural history of interactivity and an interactive history of architecture."

Steenson holds a PhD in architecture from Princeton University, a Master's in Environmental Design from Yale School of Architecture, and a BA in German from the University of Wisconsin–Madison.

== Publications ==
=== Books ===
- Architectural Intelligence: How Designers & Architects Created the Digital Landscape (MIT Press, 2017)
- Bauhaus Futures (MIT Press, 2019), co-edited with Laura Forlano & Mike Ananny.

=== Articles ===
- "Beyond the Personal and Private: Modes of Mobile Phone Sharing in India," The Reconstruction of Space and Time: Mobile Communication Practices (2008)
- "Interfaces to the Subterranean," Cabinet 41 (summer 2011) - about postal services and pneumatic tube systems
