= Swedes in Chicago =

Ethnic group

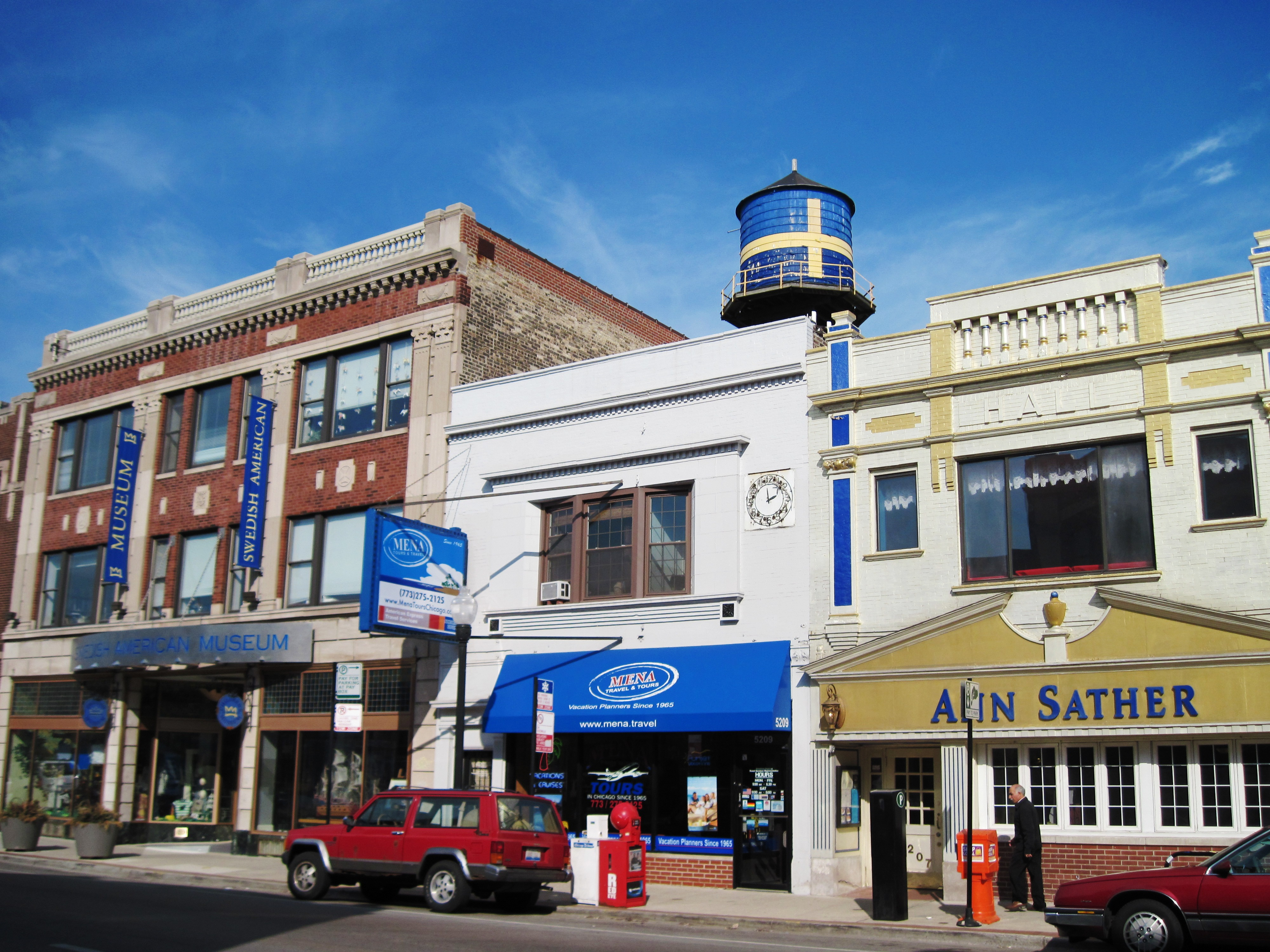
Andersonville Commercial Historic District

Swedes constitute a considerable ethnic group in Chicago, with roughly 15,000 people in the city claiming Swedish ancestry. Today the majority of Chicagoland Swedes live outside of the city, with over 140,000 residents of Swedish ancestry in the Chicago metropolitan area.

== History ==
Like other European ethnic groups, people left Sweden in search of better economic opportunities during the mid-1800s.

In the year 1900, Chicago was the city with the second highest number of Swedes after Stockholm, the capital of Sweden. By then, Swedes in Chicago, most of whom settled in the Andersonville neighborhood, especially in the years following the Great Chicago Fire, had founded the Evangelical Covenant Church and established such enduring institutions as Swedish Covenant Hospital and North Park University. The fire destroyed much of the Swedish-American community, including four Swedish churches, and as many Swedish newspapers. Other Swedish neighborhoods included Lake View, which at its peak had about 20,000 Swedes. In addition to Chicago, Swedish immigrants settled in Rockford and other parts of Illinois.

Like other Swedish-American communities, the Chicago Swedes had their own newspaper, Hemlandet (Swedish for "The Homeland"). This paper was founded in 1855 by Rev. T. N. Hasselquist and moved from Galesburg to Chicago in 1859 — establishing Chicago as a principal Swedish language publishing center. Hemlandet was a nationally distributed Swedish-language newspaper of great significance in the development of the Swedish-American community. Johan Alfred Enander, was its editor from 1869 to 1890 and was influential in Swedish-American cultural and political matters.

Many Chicago Swedes entered the construction business as part working their way up the economic ladder, though most started as carpenters and laborers. The Gust K. Newberg Construction company has emerged as one of Chicago's most prominent architectural firms. It is estimated that Swedes have been involved in building almost half the buildings in Chicago.

Today, Chicago is twinned with Gothenburg, Sweden, a testament to the longstanding connection between Sweden and the Greater Chicago Area.

== Organizations in Chicago preserving Swedish heritage ==
The following places in Chicago have been founded by Swedes or to preserve Swedish heritage:

- Swedish American Museum Andersonville, Chicago, IL
- Swedish Covenant Hospital, Chicago, IL
- Swedish Club of Chicago
