= Consulate General of Sweden, San Francisco =

Consular representation of the Kingdom of Sweden in the United States

- Location: San Francisco
- Address: 595 Market Street, Suite #1350; San Francisco, CA 94105; United States
- Coordinates: 37.789251°N 122.400811°W
- Opening: January 1, 2024 (Note: The Consulate General has its origins in the Honorary Consulate which was opened on May 25, 1850.)
- Jurisdiction: California; Hawaii
- Consul General: Cecilia Ekholm
- Website: Official website

The Consulate General of Sweden, San Francisco is the diplomatic mission of Sweden in San Francisco, California. It is located at 595 Market Street in the Financial District.

The consulate general has its origins in the Swedish consulate that was opened in 1850, which was transformed into a consulate general in 1943. The primary responsibilities of the consulate general were to disseminate information about Sweden and Swedish collaboration opportunities, promote business activities through the organization of various events, handle consular matters (mainly passport and visa processing), and provide assistance to Swedish citizens in the western United States.

The consulate general's jurisdiction included, in addition to the city of San Francisco, the states of California, Alaska, Arizona, Hawaii, Idaho, Nevada, Oregon, Utah, Washington, and later New Mexico until 1980 when Sweden's Consulate General in Los Angeles opened, taking over responsibility for certain states. In 1982, the consulate general in San Francisco was downgraded to a consulate, and the following year, it was completely closed. From 1983, a Swedish honorary consulate general operated in San Francisco, with an unpaid honorary consul general as the head. In 2024, Sweden reopened the consulate general in San Francisco.

== History ==
=== 1850–1984 ===
The consulate general in San Francisco has its origins in the honorary consulate established by royal decree on May 25, 1850, with California as its consular district. The latter was extended by royal decree on April 12, 1872, to also include the states of Oregon, as well as the Washington Territory and the Territory of Alaska. By 1914, it encompassed the states of Washington, Oregon, Idaho, California, Nevada, Utah, and Arizona, as well as the Territory of Alaska. An office allowance of 500 riksdaler banco, previously granted to the consul, was withdrawn on November 7, 1856, but a new contribution of 4,000 kronor was granted to the consul on November 5, 1888. It was later increased to 5,000 kr, but on May 11, 1906, it was reduced to 1,000 kr and raised again on December 2, 1911, to 5,000 kr.

In 1943, the consulate was elevated to a consulate general. In 1949 funds were appropriated to establish a position for a Commercial Assistant at the Consulate General in San Francisco on the same principles as apply to similar posts at other consulates.

In November 1980, the Ministry of the Budget ordered the Ministry for Foreign Affairs to cut eight million from its expenses. Among other things, by reducing Swedish representation abroad. This affected, among other things, the Consulate General in San Francisco. In the same year, the Consulate General of Sweden, Los Angeles headed by a career diplomat opened, and two years later, the consulate general in San Francisco was downgraded to a consulate.

In 1981, the local employees at the Consulate General in San Francisco carried out a historic strike, marking the first time officials from the Ministry for Foreign Affairs went on strike. The six strikers, including a clerk, a receptionist, two information officers, the Consul General's secretary, and the chauffeur, protested against plans to relocate certain services to Los Angeles as part of a cost-cutting plan. The strike, which had been previously delayed, was triggered by a conflict regarding the right to be represented by the Swedish Confederation of Professional Employees. Despite the Consul General's claim that the absence of local employees would not impact the consulate's operations, the strikers argued that it was a way to undermine their strike by personally answering phones and handling mail. The conflict led to frustration and highlighted tensions surrounding the potential closure of the consulate under the cost-cutting plan.

In 1983, the dismantling of the consulate general in San Francisco had commenced. The number of deployed officials had been reduced from five to three. The position of consul general ceased in the spring of 1982, and the remaining staff would then, during a transitional period, oversee the continued winding down of the authority. All deployed officials at the agency were expected to be reassigned by the spring of 1984. The consulate general would be officially phased out by January 1, 1984, at which point an honorary consul general had been appointed to oversee the honorary consulate general.

=== Honorary consulate general ===
In connection with the 1989 Loma Prieta earthquake, it was reported that Sweden's honorary consulate general in San Francisco had evacuated. It was located on the 21st floor of a high-rise building and no one was allowed to enter the building.

On July 1, 1992, the Swedish Information Service in San Francisco which was located at the Honorary Consulate General of Sweden on 120 Montgomery Street, Suite 2175, was integrated with the Consulate General of Sweden, Los Angeles.

In May 1997, it was reported that Sweden would once again open a consulate general in California, two years after the Consulate General of Sweden, Los Angeles was closed. The new consulate general would have a focus on trade and finance. San Francisco was opted out and instead the Consulate General in Los Angeles reopened in 1998, then closed in 2009.

For several years, the organization Swedes Worldwide (Svenskar i Världen) had been lobbying the Minister for Foreign Affairs and the Ministry for Foreign Affairs for more Swedish missions worldwide, including a consulate general on the West Coast of the United States. The organization had emphasized to Foreign Minister Ann Linde on multiple occasions that Swedes living on the West Coast of the United States were in great need of a consulate general. The need became even more pressing when the mobile passport unit was discontinued in 2019, requiring Swedes on the West Coast and surrounding areas to travel to the Swedish embassy in Washington D.C. or the consulate general in New York City to renew their passports.

=== Reopening ===
The career consular mission opened on January 1, 2024 in San Francisco, and its areas of responsibility includes the states of California and Hawaii. In connection with the opening on January 1, the consulate general took over consular responsibility from the Swedish embassy in Washington. The main focus of the new consulate general was the promotion of trade and Sweden. The consulate general would also provide consular support with passport operations in the area of operation.

On February 20, 2024, Victoria, Crown Princess of Sweden presided over the inauguration of the new consulate general at a ceremony in the San Francisco Conservatory of Music, in the presence of the Minister for Foreign Trade Johan Forssell.

== Tasks ==
In the late 1950s, the consulate general dealt with trade, shipping, and inheritance matters. Approximately 120 vessels arrived each year, carrying oil and paper. These included not only the well-known Johnson Line vessels sailing to and from Sweden, but above all Swedish vessels operating on the Australia route. As for inheritance matters, the consulate general handled approximately 300 cases per year.

Following the reopening of the consulate general on 1 January 2024, its responsibilities included providing assistance to Swedish citizens and promoting Swedish interests in California and Hawaii. The Section for Consular Affairs handled matters such as passports, citizenship questions, name registrations, and document certifications. It also assisted Swedish citizens in emergency situations. The Section for Trade and Export Promotion worked on trade, export, and business-related activities to promote exchanges between Sweden, California, and Hawaii.

== District ==
The consular district from 1969 to 1975 included, in addition to San Francisco, the states of California, Alaska, Arizona, Hawaii, Idaho, Nevada, Oregon, Utah and Washington. The district was expanded in 1976 with the state of New Mexico. The district was changed in 1979 with the opening of the Consulate General of Sweden in Los Angeles. The district now included San Francisco, the states of California — with the exception of the counties of San Luis Obispo, Kern, Santa Barbara, Los Angeles, Ventura, San Bernardino, Orange, Riverside, Imperial, and San Diego — Alaska, Arizona, Hawaii, Idaho, Nevada, Oregon, Utah and Washington.

In 1981, the Consulate General in Los Angeles took over the states of Arizona and Hawaii. In 1982, the Consulate General in San Francisco was downgraded to a consulate and the district was thus changed to include the city of San Francisco and the counties of San Mateo, Santa Clara, Alameda, Contra Costa, Solano, Napa, Sonoma, and Marin. After the honorary consulate general took over the operations in 1983, the district consisted of the City of San Francisco and the California counties of Alameda, Contra Costa, Marin, Napa, San Mateo, Santa Clara, Solano, and Sonoma.

After the consulate general reopens in 2024, the area of responsibility consists of the states of California and Hawaii.

== Buildings ==
=== Offices ===
In 1921, the consulate general was located at 268 Market Street in the Financial District. From 1922 to 1941, the consulate general was situated in the Marston Building at 244 Kearny Street in Union Square. From 1942 to 1946, the consulate general was located at 64 Pine Street in the Financial District. In 1947, no address was available. From 1948 to 1951, the consulate general was situated at 1918 Jackson Street in Pacific Heights. From 1952 to 1983, the consulate general was located at 1960 Jackson Street in Pacific Heights. Between 1983 and 2012, the honorary consulate general was situated at 120 Montgomery Street, Suite 2175. From 2013, the honorary consulate general was situated at 505 Sansome Street, Suite 1010 in the Financial District. Since the reopening of the consulate general in 2024, it is located at 595 Market Street, Suite 1350 in the Financial District.

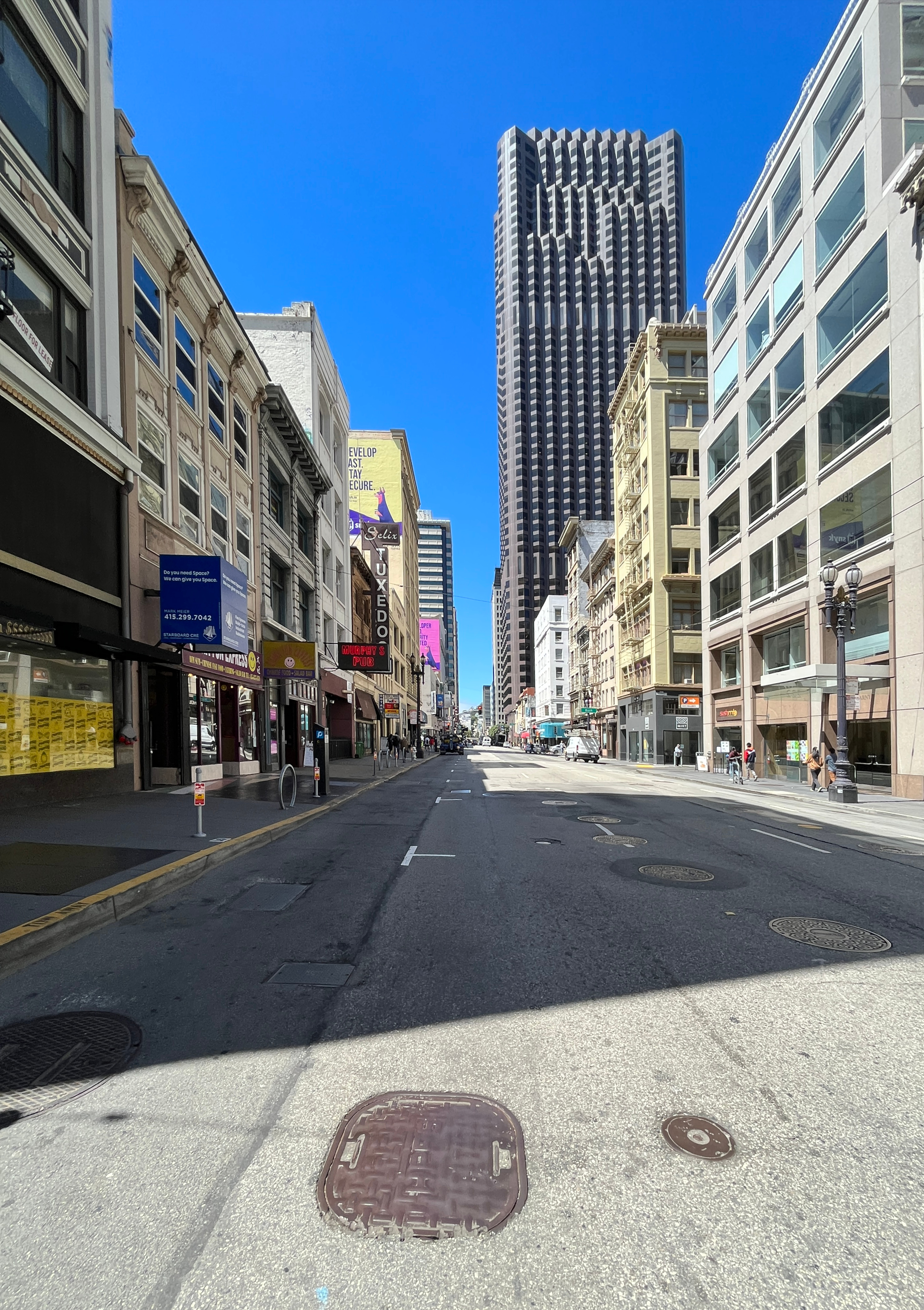
244 Kearny Street (yellow building to the right)
(1935–1941)

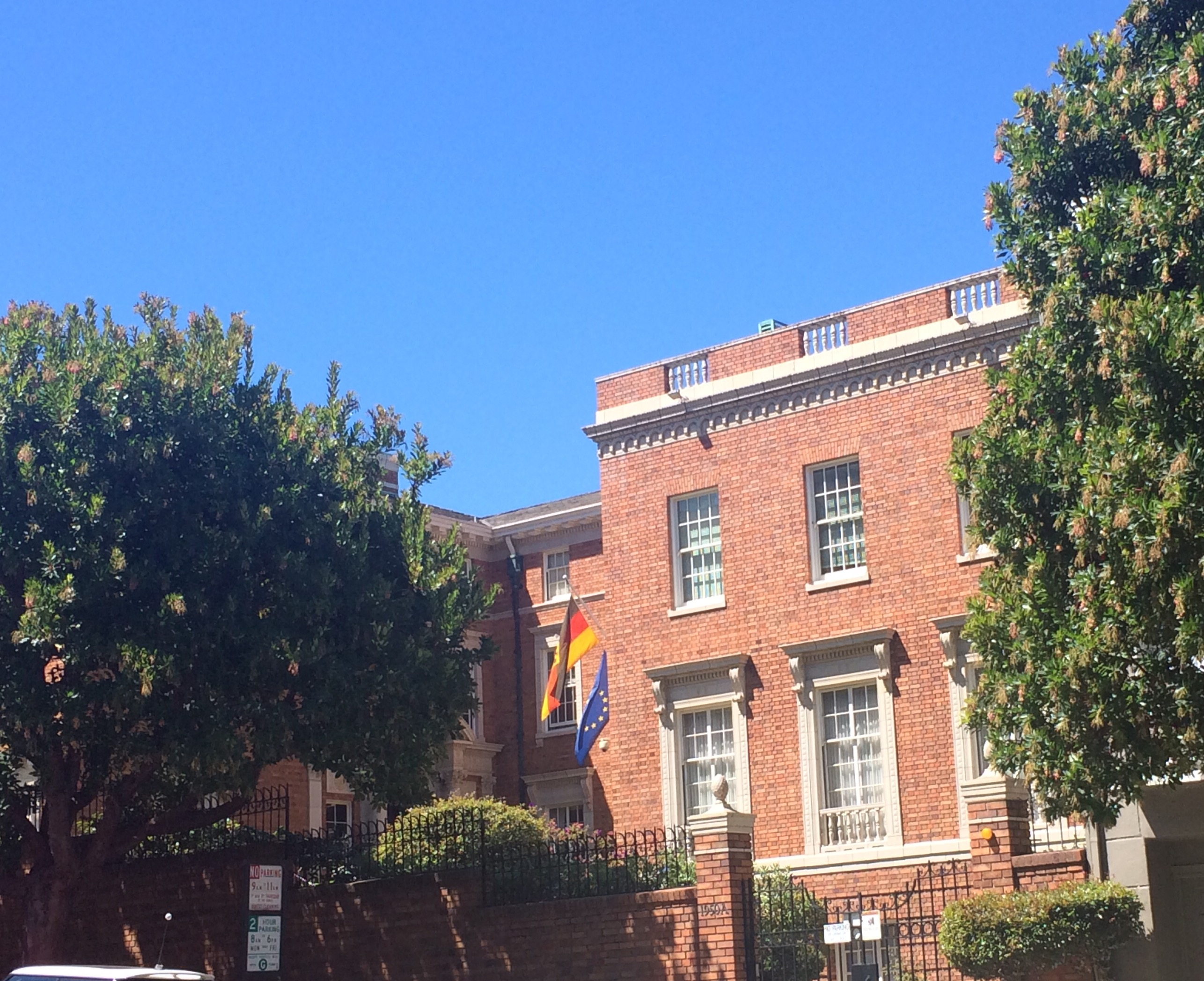
1960 Jackson Street, Pacific Heights
(1952–1983)

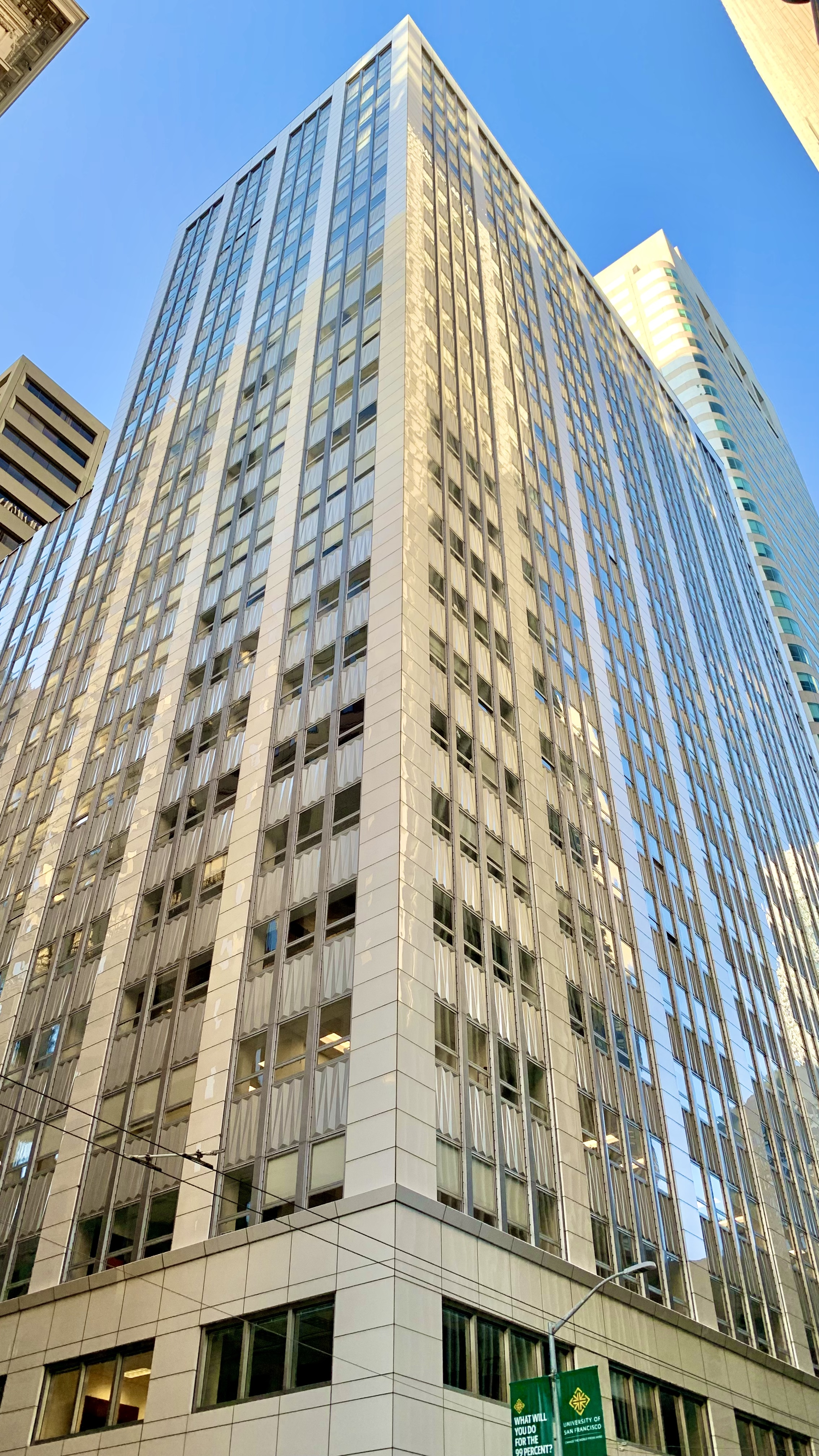
120 Montgomery Street, Financial District
(1983–2012)

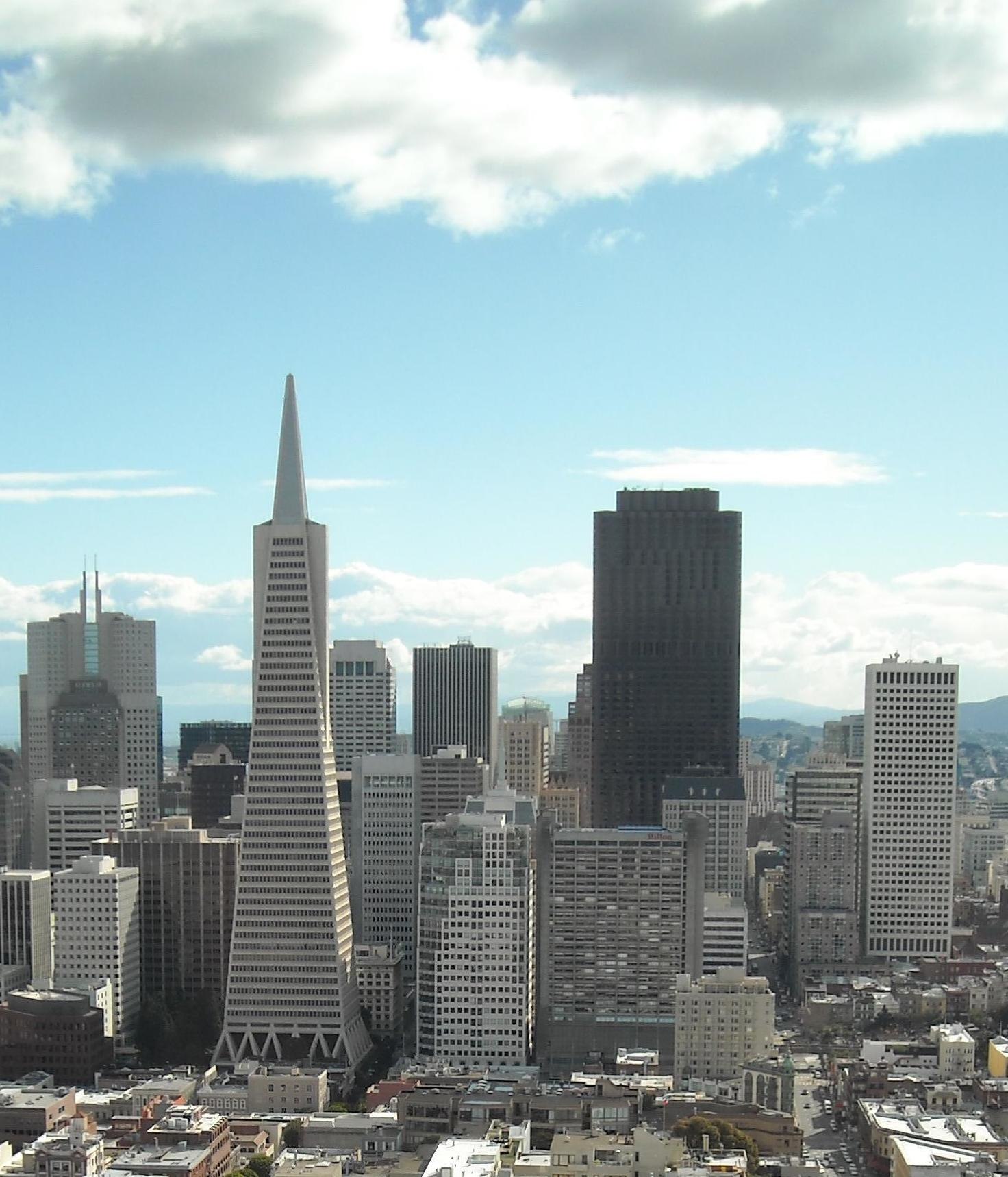
505 Sansome Street (white blgd to the left), Financial District
(2013–2023)

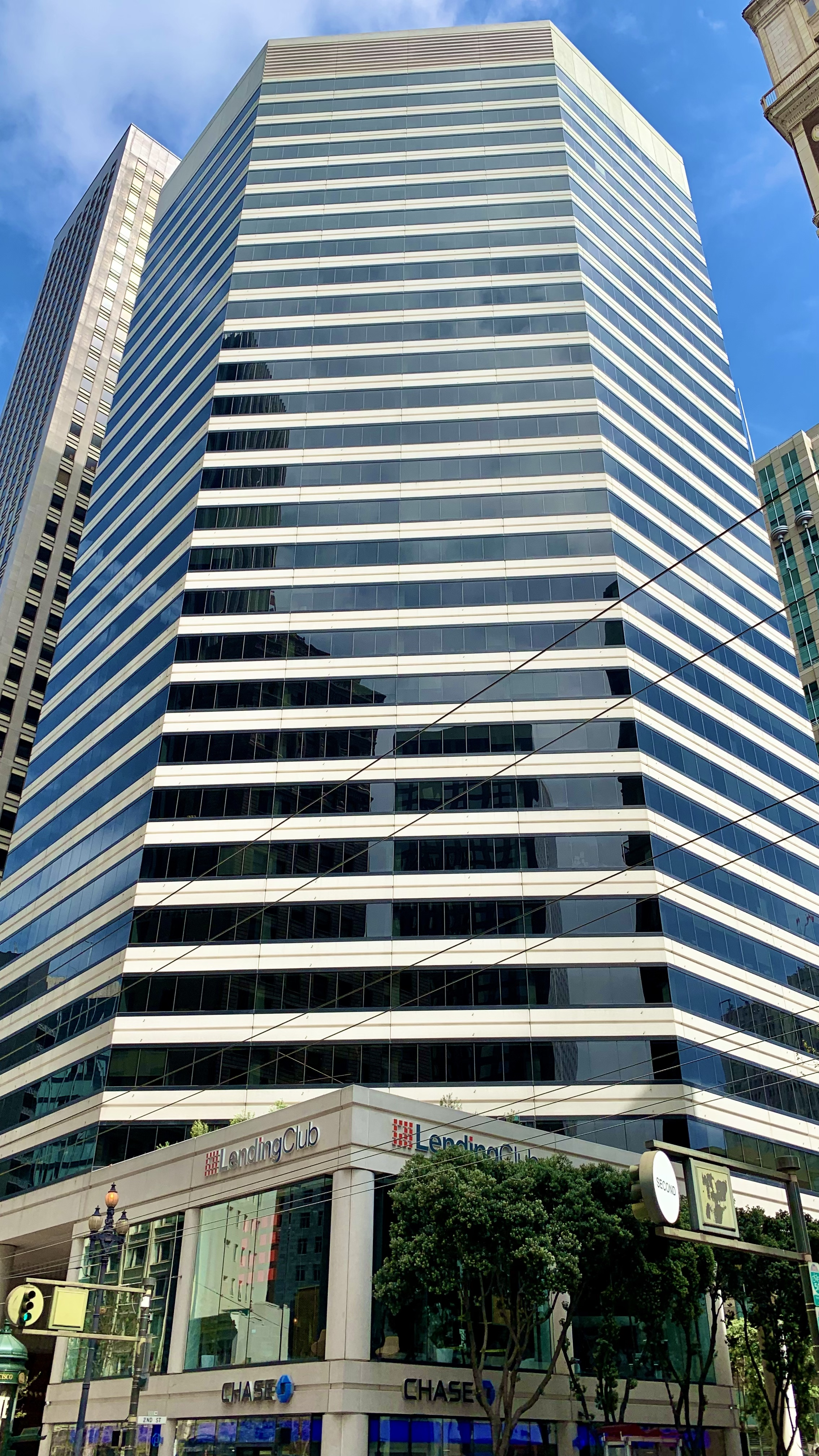
595 Market Street, Financial District
(2024–present)

=== 1650 and 1960 Jackson Street ===
In a proposition from the King in Council to the Riksdag dated November 8, 1946, the Riksdag proposed approving the acquisition of a property deemed suitable for the Swedish representation in San Francisco. The property on Jackson Street consisted of two interconnected houses, built in 1915 and 1920, and was located in a desirable residential district near the city's business center. It was intended for use as the residence for the consul general, as well as for the consulate general's office and the residence for the vice consul. The property also offered opportunities for meeting spaces and facilities for seamen's reception. A real estate expert had assessed that the property was in good condition, and the purchase was suggested as an economically advantageous solution. The consul general justified the acquisition by pointing out the increasing rental costs for current premises and the difficulties for the staff in finding reasonable housing in San Francisco. The purchase would also allow rental income from surplus housing within the property. The National Board of Public Building (Byggnadsstyrelsen) reviewed plans and photographs, supporting the proposal. The department head considered the property suitable and economically advantageous, proposing a budget of 590,000 kronor for the acquisition. He also mentioned that certain furnishings should be obtained for seamen's and meeting rooms, to be funded from the proposed budget for stationery materials at embassies and consulates.

The property comprised a total of 25 rooms. The first house was intended for the residence of the consul general, who would have access to three living rooms and four bedrooms, in addition to the kitchen area and quarters for service personnel. The ground floor and first floor of the second house were designated for spacious premises for the consulate general's office. The third floor would be arranged as the residence for the vice consul, including a living room, dining room, three bedrooms, and a kitchen. Additionally, the property included a caretaker's residence and a garage. The original construction cost was stated as $300,000. The plot measured 45.7 x 38.7 meters, and its value was estimated at $75,000. The purchase price amounted to $160,000 or, in Swedish currency, 576,000 kronor.

The house at 1960 Jackson Street contained 9,000 square feet four times the size of an average three-bedroom home, with 15 principal rooms, seven baths, sitting rooms, dressing rooms, servants' quarters and storage rooms and the "secret passageways" that connect it with 1950 Jackson next door. The houses were designed by William Bliss of the firm of Bliss Faville, architects of the St. Francis Hotel the original Southern Pacific Building and the University Club. The older, 1960 Jackson, was built in 1921 by Lillian Matson, wife of William Matson, Swedish-born founder of the Matson Navigation Co. About 1924, Mrs Matson built 1950 Jackson Street, on the right of the court, for her daughter and son-in-law Mr. and Mrs. William P. Roth. The red brick buildings, which according to San Francisco's rigorous earthquake laws cannot be made of solid brick due to the risk of it collapsing in earthquakes, are therefore only clad in a brick facade.

As the Swedish consulate general was downgraded to a consulate and then closed in 1983, the houses were put up for sale as the consulate relocated most of its staff to Los Angeles. This move sparked concerns among Pacific Heights residents, echoing past disputes over the neighborhood's character. Anne Bloomfield, representing the Pacific Heights Residents Association, vehemently opposed any proposal that conflicted with the single-family zoning of the Swedish Consulate's buildings. This stance put potential buyers in direct conflict with Bloomfield's organization, as well as city planning authorities. Despite being listed for two months by Grubb and Ellis, the properties weren't sold, underscoring the shortage of single-family buyers.

The conflict extended beyond the immediate neighborhood dynamics. Mansion buyers often sought tax write-offs and attempted to repurpose these historic buildings into institutions or offices. This clashed with residents like Mrs. Spreckels and Mrs. McGinnis, who strove to preserve Pacific Heights' unique character and avoid increased traffic. The grandeur of the mansions, especially 1960 Jackson Street with its 9,000 square feet, posed challenges for potential buyers. The high prices, ranging from $1.45 million to $125 million, deterred families, and even if they could afford the purchase, the maintenance costs and sheer size of the properties made them impractical for many. The history of conflicts over prime Pacific Heights property, such as the Matson family's earlier tussle before the Planning Commission, highlighted the ongoing struggle between preservationists and those seeking to redefine the use of historic estates. As the former Swedish Consulate's fate hung in the balance, it reflected broader challenges in maintaining single-family residences amid evolving real estate trends in San Francisco.

In 1987, the properties were bought by the German government, restored, and adapted for the German consulate general.

== Heads of Mission ==
| Name | Period | Title | Notes | Ref |
(Honorary) consulate (1850–1943)
| Johan Jakob Ludvig Herrlich | April 22, 1852 – November 7, 1856 | Honorary consul | Acting May 20, 1851. | |
| Georg C. Johnson | December 15, 1857 – May 19, 1872 | Honorary consul (Note: Consul general on July 27, 1866.) | Acting November 7, 1856. Died in office. | |
| Gustaf O'Hara Taaffe | April 12, 1873 – April 16, 1874 | Honorary consul (Note: Vice consul on March 26, 1867.) | Acting September 6, 1872. Died in office. | |
| August Berggren | August 12, 1875 – October 31, 1884 | Consul | | |
| Knud Henry Lund | April 24, 1885 – May 11, 1906 | Honorary consul | | |
| Henry Lund | 1906–1908 | Acting honorary consul | Vice consul in 1901. | |
| William Matson | March 15, 1908 – October 11, 1917 | Consul | Consul general n.h.o.v.. Died in office. | |
| – | 1918–1918 | Consul | Vacant. | |
| Fredrik Westerberg | 1918–1919 | Acting consul | Vacant. Vice consul Westerberg served as acting consul. | |
| Carl Edvard Wallerstedt | 1919–1921 | Acting consul | | |
| Carl Edvard Wallerstedt | 1922–1943 | Consul | | |
Consulate general (1943–1983)
| Carl Edvard Wallerstedt | 1943–1944 | Acting consul general | | |
| Carl Edvard Wallerstedt | 1944 – February 1, 1947 | Consul general | | |
| Victor Emanuel (Manne) Lindholm | 1947 – April 1, 1960 | Consul general | | |
| Per Anger | 1961–1966 | Consul general | | |
| Carl Henrik Petersén | 1966–1972 | Consul general | | |
| Hans-Efraim Sköld | 1972–1976 | Consul general | | |
| Cecilia Nettelbrandt | 1976–1978 | Consul general | Political appointee (non-career diplomat) | |
| Fredrik Bergenstråhle | 1979–1980 | Consul general | | |
| Otto Rathsman | 1980–1982 | Consul general | | |
| – | 1982–1983 | Consul general | Vacant | |
| Odd Isaksson | September 17, 1981 – 1983 | Consul/Acting consul general | | |
Honorary consulate (1983–2023)
| Sven A. Eliason | December 27, 1983 – May 24, 1985 | Honorary consul general | Died in office. | |
| Siri Eliason | November 20, 1985 – 1998 | Honorary consul general | | |
| Barbro Sachs-Osher | February 11, 1999 – 2023 | Honorary consul general | | |
Consulate general (2023–present)
| Anna Lekvall | August 2023 – 2025 | Consul general | | |
| Cecilia Ekholm | 2025–present | Consul general | | |

== See also ==
- Consulate General of Sweden, Chicago
- Consulate General of Sweden, Houston
- Consulate General of Sweden, Minneapolis
- Consulate General of Sweden, New York City
- Consulate General of Sweden, Los Angeles
