= 595 Market Street =

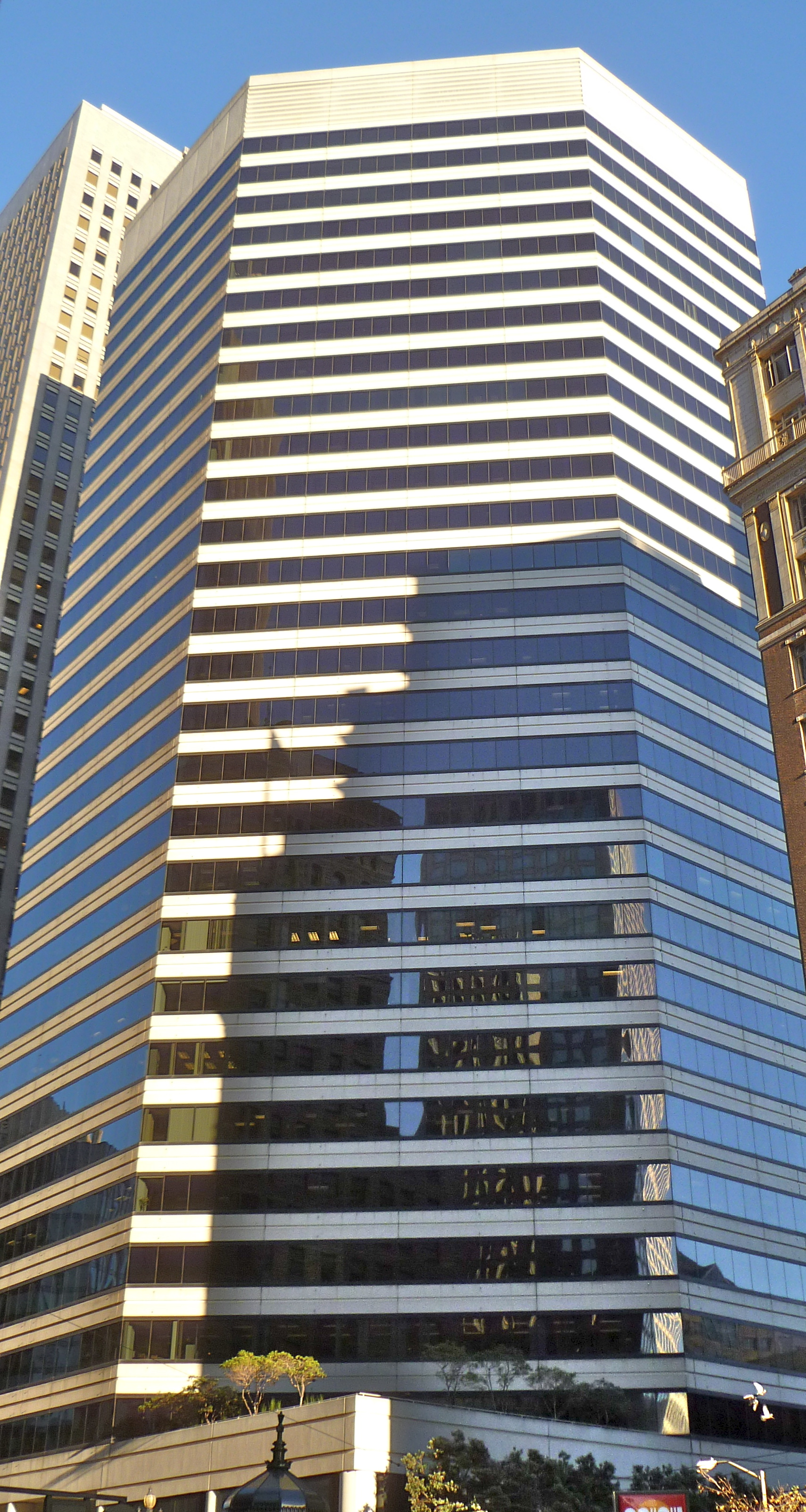

- Location within San Francisco Location within California Location within the United States

General information
- Status: Completed
- Type: Office
- Location: 595 Market Street, San Francisco, California, United States
- Coordinates: 37.789251°N 122.400811°W
- Opening: 1979
- Owner: Tishman Speyer

Height
- Roof: 410 ft (125 m)

Technical details
- Floor count: 30
- Floor area: 429,600 sq ft (39,910 m^{2})

Design and construction
- Architect: Skidmore, Owings & Merrill

595 Market Street is a 410 ft (125 m) skyscraper at the corner of Second Street and Market Street in the Financial District of San Francisco, California. It contains 30 floors, and was completed in 1979. The hexagonal-shaped skyscraper was designed by Skidmore, Owings & Merrill.

In 2009, Visa Inc. moved its corporate headquarters to 595 Market Street from San Mateo, before deciding to move to Foster City in October 2012. Current tenants include LendingClub and the Consulate General of Sweden.

== See also ==
- List of tallest buildings in San Francisco
