= Carl Edvard Wallerstedt =

Swedish diplomat (1882–1963)

- Born: 11 January 1882; Karlstad, Sweden
- Died: 27 June 1963 (aged 81); Enebyberg, Sweden
- Education: Karlstad Higher General Secondary School
- Occupation: Diplomat
- Years active: 1900–1947
- Spouse: Märta Fogelqvist (m. 1910)
- Children: 1

Carl Edvard Wallerstedt (11 January 1882 – 27 June 1963) was a Swedish diplomat who served as consul and consul general in San Francisco from 1919 to 1947. He began his career as a journalist, working for several Swedish newspapers and becoming a member of the Swedish Publicists' Association. In 1907, he travelled to the United States as a newspaper correspondent but subsequently joined the Swedish legation in Washington, D.C.

Wallerstedt later served as vice-consul and consul in Minneapolis, where he participated in Swedish-American cultural organizations and initiatives promoting Scandinavian art. In 1919, he became acting consul in San Francisco, overseeing Swedish consular affairs across the American West Coast, Alaska, Hawaii, and several western states. During his tenure, he supported the Swedish-American community, promoted cultural and educational ties between Sweden and the United States, and oversaw the expansion of the consulate. He also participated in diplomatic and cultural events, including presenting the Royal Swedish Aero Club's gold plaque to Charles Lindbergh in 1927. Before retiring in 1947, he arranged for the purchase of a new building for the Swedish consulate general and the consul general's residence.

== Early life ==
Wallerstedt was born on 11 January 1882 in Karlstad, Sweden, the son of merchant Edvard Wallerstedt and his wife, Amina Lindberg. He attended Karlstad Higher General Secondary School from 1892 to 1900. From 1900 to 1901, he worked in the editorial department of the Svenska Telegrambyrån, followed by studies in Germany and England from 1901 to 1903.

== Career ==
From 1904 to 1906, Wallerstedt worked in the editorial departments of the Svenska Telegrambyrån, Stockholms Dagblad, and Nya Dagligt Allehanda. He was a member of the Swedish Publicists' Association. As a journalist in Stockholm, he specialized in foreign news and feature articles. In 1907, he was sent to the Jamestown Exposition in Virginia as a representative of a Swedish newspaper syndicate. After arriving in the United States, Wallerstedt met Sweden's minister in Washington, D.C., Herman Lagercrantz, who offered him a clerical position at the Swedish legation. He served there from 1907 to 1909 before being transferred to Minneapolis to handle consular affairs under honorary consul Charles Axel Smith. Initially appointed unpaid vice-consul in 1909, Wallerstedt became consul in Minneapolis in 1914.

During his time in Minneapolis, Wallerstedt was active in Swedish-American cultural organizations. He served as treasurer of the American Union of Swedish Singers from 1911 to 1914 and was involved in efforts to promote the city as a centre of Scandinavian art in the United States. A committee established by the Odin Club under its chairman, Thomas Skellet, helped establish an art association in 1914. Wallerstedt served on its five-member board alongside, among others, Governor Adolph Olson Eberhart. He also served on the board of the Wennerberg Memorial Association, which sought to erect a statue of Swedish poet and composer Gunnar Wennerberg in Minneapolis. The statue, sculpted by Carl Eldh, was unveiled in Minnehaha Park on Midsummer's Day in 1915. Approximately 25,000 people attended the ceremony, during which Wallerstedt presented the statue to Mayor Wallace G. Nye following a performance of "Hör oss, Svea" by a Swedish choir. Governor Winfield Scott Hammond also addressed the gathering.

In 1919, Wallerstedt became acting consul in San Francisco, where he was responsible for Swedish consular affairs across a district encompassing the Pacific Coast, Alaska, Hawaii, Idaho, Utah, Nevada, and Arizona. He was appointed consul in 1921 and received the title of consul general in late 1938. He continued in the position until his retirement, effective 1 February 1947. During his tenure in San Francisco, Wallerstedt represented Swedish interests and supported the Swedish-American community. At the time, California had approximately 50,000 Swedish-born residents, including more than 20,000 in Los Angeles, while the San Francisco Bay Area had over 15,000. The consulate's staff expanded from two assistants to eleven employees by 1947, and Swedish shipping along the American West Coast experienced renewed growth.

Wallerstedt also participated in cultural and diplomatic events involving Sweden and the United States. Crown Prince Gustaf Adolf and Louise Mountbatten spent several weeks in San Francisco during their 1926 visit to the United States, and Prince Wilhelm visited the following year on a lecture tour. In September 1927, Wallerstedt presented Charles Lindbergh with the Royal Swedish Aero Club's gold plaque at a reception at San Francisco City Hall. In 1931, he was appointed honorary chairman of a Swedish Olympic committee established in Los Angeles. He was also involved in promoting Swedish education and cultural institutions in the United States. In 1946, Assar Janzén became the first holder of a chair in Scandinavian languages at the University of California, Berkeley, following a fundraising initiative by three Swedish-American businessmen.

One of Wallerstedt's final initiatives before his retirement was to arrange the purchase, on behalf of the Swedish government, of the former home of Swedish-American shipping magnate William Matson at 1960 Jackson Street in San Francisco. The property became the new premises of the Swedish consulate general and the consul general's residence. Wallerstedt was an honorary member of the Swedish-American Patriotic League of California and the Vasa Order of America, a Swedish-American fraternal organization. He was also affiliated with the Swedish Singing Society and was elected the first president of the Consular Society of San Francisco when it was established in May 1931. He was a member of the Bohemian Club and the Union League Club in San Francisco.

== Personal life ==
In 1910, Wallerstedt married Märta Fogelqvist (1888–1970), daughter of parish minister Anders Fogelqvist and Hilda Bergmanson. Their son, Stig, was born in Minneapolis on 28 April 1911.

Like her husband, Märta Wallerstedt was active in club affairs. She served as honorary president of Utile Dulci, a leading Swedish women's organization.

After Wallerstedt retired as consul general in San Francisco, the couple remained in the United States and settled in Lower Lake, California. In 1957, they moved to South Carolina to live near their son. On 20 May 1958, they returned to Sweden.

Following Carl Edvard Wallerstedt's death in 1963, Märta returned to the United States to live with their son, Commander Stig Wallerstedt. She died on 4 March 1970 in Isle of Palms, South Carolina.

== Death ==
Wallerstedt died on 27 June 1963 in Enebyberg, Sweden. The funeral service took place on 5 July 1963 at the Northern Crematorium at Norra begravningsplatsen near Stockholm.

== Awards and decorations ==
- (Sweden) Commander of the Order of the Polar Star (6 June 1940)
- (Sweden) Knight of the Order of the Polar Star (6 June 1932)
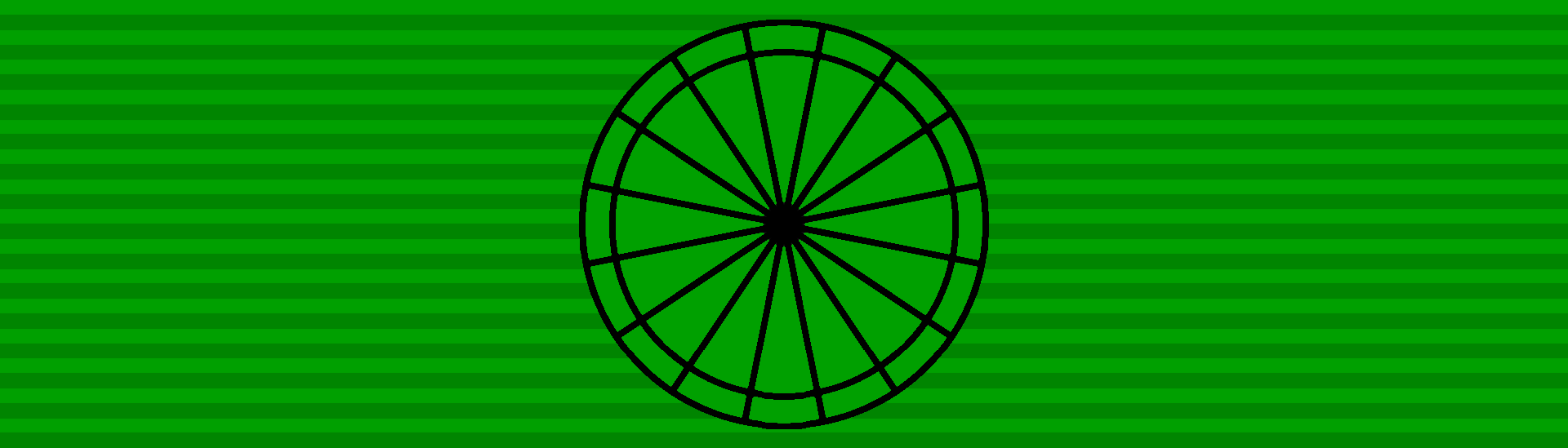
- (Sweden) Knight 1st Class of the Order of Vasa (28 October 1920)
- 3rd Class of the Order of Merit of the Kingdom of Hungary

Diplomatic posts
| Preceded by Charles Axel Smith | Consul of Sweden to Minneapolis; 1914–1919 | Succeeded by Theophilus Wessén |
| Preceded by Fredrik Westerberg | Consul/Consul General of Sweden to San Francisco; 1919–1947 | Succeeded by Manne Lindholm |
