= Consular district =

Type of subnational region

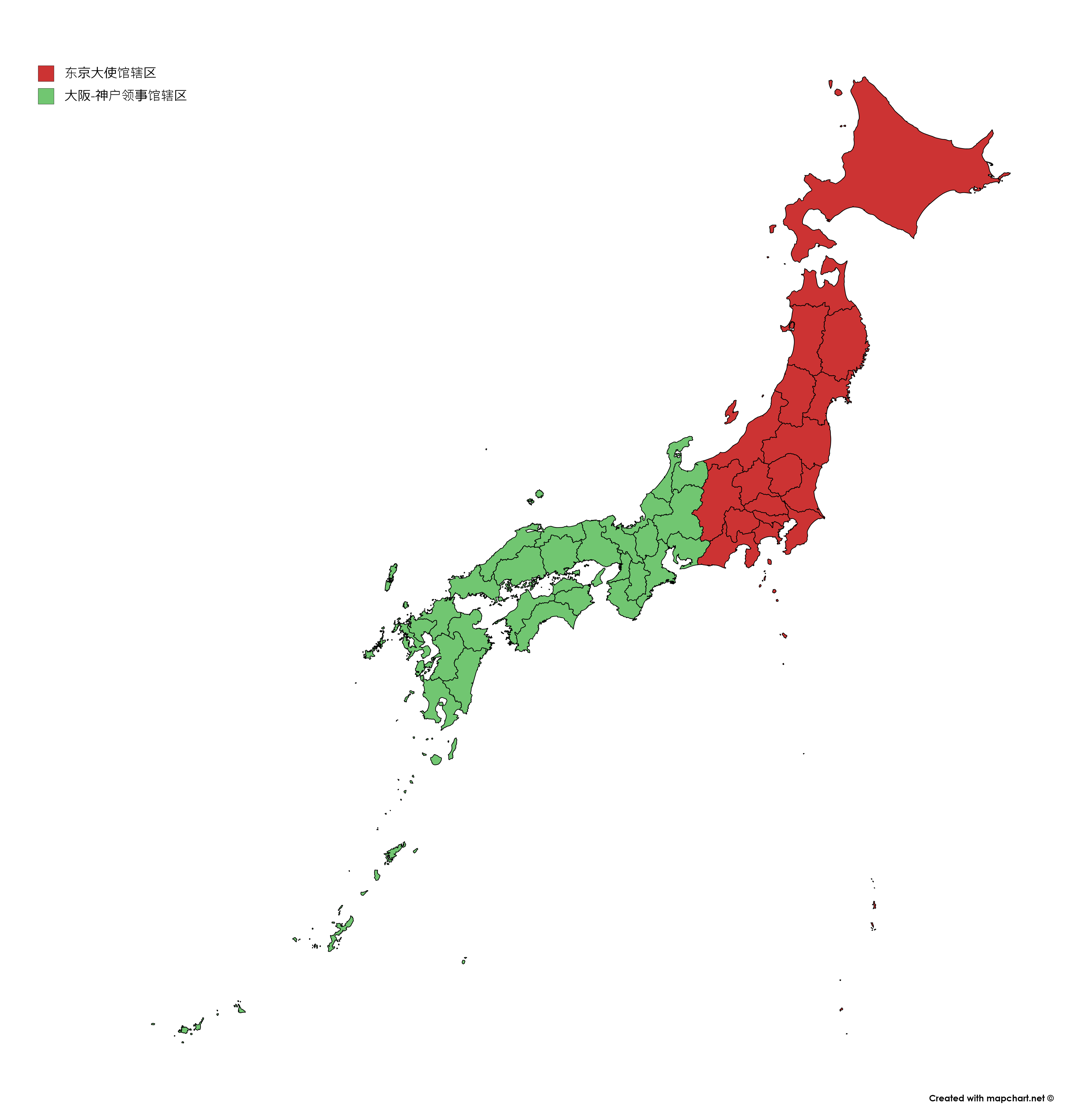
Consular districts of the German Embassy Tokyo and other German consulates in Japan.

A consular district is a sub-national region designated by a consular post to exercise consular functions in a host country. A consular district is serviced by a consul or "consul-general" and is headquartered at a consulate or "consulate-general." It is a common utility for spreading diplomatic representation and services to regions of a host country beyond a guest country's embassy in the capital.

== Example ==
For instance, the United States' consular representation in India and Bhutan is divided into 5 regions. One of which, the New Delhi Consular District (based at the U.S. consulate in New Delhi), covers the Indian states of Delhi, Haryana, Himachal Pradesh, Jammu and Kashmir, Punjab, Rajasthan, Uttar Pradesh, Uttaranchal, and the Kingdom of Bhutan. Consular districts are demarcated to serve only citizens resident within the district with non-immigrant visas.
