= Chhim Sithar =

Cambodian trade union leader

- ឈឹម ស៊ីថរ
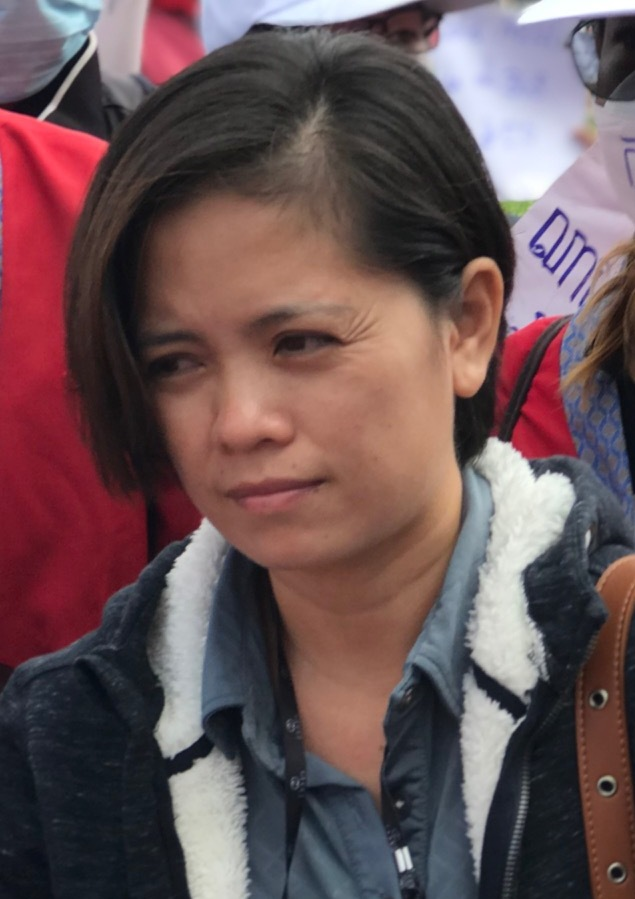

President of the Labor Rights Supported Union of Khmer Employees of Naga World
- Incumbent
- Assumed office 2014
- Preceded by: Chhun Sokha (ឈុន សុខា)

Vice President of the Labour Rights Supported Union of Khmer Employees of NagaWorld (LRSU)
- In office 2012–2014
- Preceded by: Nou Sab (នូ ស៊ាប)
- Succeeded by: Chhun Sokha (ឈុន សុខា)

Personal details
- Born: December 25, 1987 (age 38) Koh Roka Commune, Peam Chor District, Prey Veng province, Cambodia
- Occupation: Casino worker, trade unionist

Chhim Sithar (Khmer: ឈឹម ស៊ីថរ; born 25 December 1987) is a Cambodian trade union leader and the current president of the Labor Rights Supported Union (LRSU) of Khmer Employees of NagaWorld. She served a two-year sentence for incitement in connection to a labour strike she led at NagaWorld in 2021 and 2022.

== Biography ==
=== Early life and career ===
Sithar was born on 25 December 1987 in Koh Roka Commune, Peam Chor District, Prey Veng province, the second of six children. She earned a bachelor's degree in economic informatics. She began working at NagaWorld in 2007 before becoming active within LRSU in 2009. She was first elected vice-president of LRSU in 2012 and subsequently president in 2014, replacing Chhun Sokha who became vice-president.

In September 2019, she was suspended by NagaWorld after questioning the company's decision to ban a t-shirt calling for higher wages for employees. In December 2019, LRSU members voted to strike in response to the suspension. Despite a court ruling that the strike was illegal, LRSU proceeded in early January 2020. After two days of strike action, the company agreed to raise wages and reinstate Sithar.

=== 2021-22 NagaWorld dispute and imprisonment ===
In mid-2021, NagaWorld announced a planned mass layoff of more than 1,300 workers from the casino, including Sithar. Sithar alleged that the company had targeted union members with the firings, stating that the union was close to reaching its goal of 4000 members, or half of the casino's employees, at which point the union would be allowed to engage in collective bargaining under Cambodian law.

On 18 December 2021, LRSU members at NagaWorld went on strike despite a court injunction released that morning declaring the strike illegal. The strike continued on relatively peacefully for the subsequent two weeks, until nine LRSU members were arrested on the evening of 31 December. Three days later, on 3 January 2022, fourteen LRSU members were arrested protesting the detainment of those arrested several days earlier, with police reportedly searching for Sithar. The next day, she was violently arrested by plainclothes policemen outside the Australian Embassy and was charged with "incitement to commit a felony." She was subsequently held in pretrial detention for 74 days, being released on bail in March.

In April 2022, she was re-elected as president of LRSU. In June 2022, the Ministry of Labor and Vocational Training announced that it would not recognize the union's registration, claiming that Sithar was no longer an employee of NagaWorld and could therefore no longer hold an elected position in the union.

In late November 2022, Sithar attended the World Congress of the International Trade Union Confederation (ITUC) in Melbourne, Australia. Upon her return to Cambodia, she was arrested for violation of her bail conditions for traveling overseas without the court's permission. Amnesty International condemned the arrest, stating that neither she nor her lawyer were informed of the bail conditions and that she was "being detained solely for her work defending workers’ rights." The United States Department of State also called for her release. Julian Hill, an Australian Member of Parliament in the House of Representatives, described the reasons for Sithar's arrest as "nonsense" and called on the Cambodian government to release her, with the-then Australian Ambassador to Cambodia, Pablo Kang, raising "the questionable basis" of Sithar's arrest with Koeut Rith, the Cambodian Minister of Justice.

=== 2023 trial and conviction ===
The trial against Sithar and eight other LRSU leaders and activists began on 21 February 2023. On 14 March 2023, Human Rights Watch released a statement calling the charges against her "baseless" and saying that "the Cambodian government has an obligation under international human rights law not only to respect the rights of workers but also to protect these rights from abuse by private actors." A spokesperson for the Ministry of Justice responded to Human Rights Watch by saying that "the accused have already crossed the line of existing labor dispute resolution mechanisms" and that "this case follows standard legal proceedings. Just as in any court case, solid evidence and strong testimony must be presented to discharge the accused."

During the trial, the judge refused to admit recordings the defence wanted to introduce as evidence. A substantial portion of the prosecution case against Sithar rested on a series of voice clips excerpted from online Zoom meetings Sithar held with members leading up to and during the strike. Sithar's defence lawyers had sought to introduce the full recordings of those Zoom meetings into evidence so as to provide context to the clips adduced by the prosecution, however were rebuffed by presiding Judge Soeung Chakriya, who stated the court had "carried out all the procedure independently" and could not "satisfy all parties". The trial concluded on 3 May, with Sithar and her co-defendants requesting acquittal and the prosecution framing the NagaWorld strike as an illegal demonstration carried out with malicious criminal intent through the use of foreign-sourced funds. On 25 May, Sithar was convicted of incitement and sentenced to two years' imprisonment. In response to the conviction, Amnesty International, Human Rights Watch and the Australian Council of Trade Unions issued a joint statement calling for the convictions to immediately quashed and unconditionally release Sithar. Luc Triangle, the acting general secretary of the ITUC called on NagaCorp to use its "considerable influence" to persuade the Cambodian government to release Sithar.

On 19 October 2023, the Appeal Court upheld Sithar's conviction. The same month, the International Labor Organization's Committee on Freedom of Association urged "the immediate and unconditional release of Chhim Sithar."

On 3 May 2024, Cambodia's Supreme Court also upheld Sithar's conviction. Sithar, freed on 16 September 2024 after completing her sentence, pledged to persist with the NagaWorld casino strike she led against layoffs and alleged union suppression.

== Awards and recognition ==
On 2 February 2023, Sithar was awarded the Global Human Rights Defender Award by the United States Department of State, the first person from Cambodia to receive the award.

On 19 April 2024, Sithar was awarded the 2024 Per Anger Prize by the Living History Forum, a public agency established under the Swedish Ministry of Culture, for her "tireless and dedicated work to promote democracy and respect for human rights in Cambodia."
