= Canada–Sweden relations =

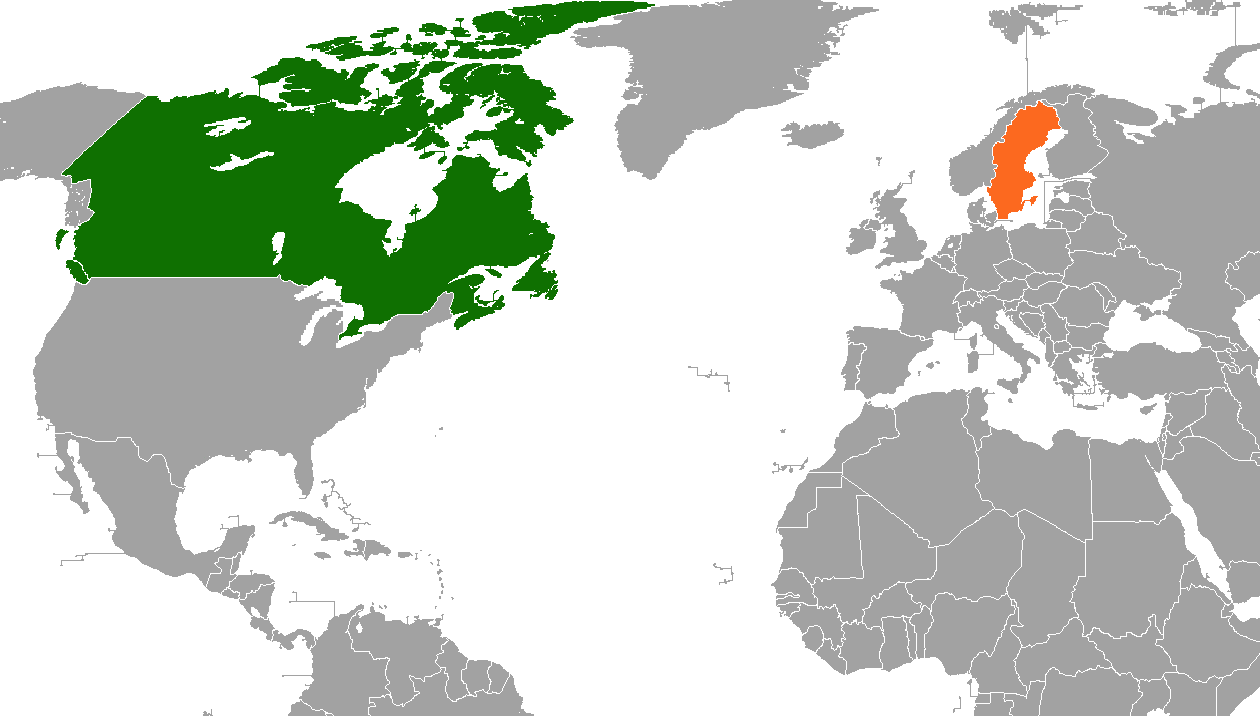

- Canada: Sweden

Envoy
- Canadian Ambassador to Sweden Jason LaTorre: Swedish Ambassador to Canada Signe Burgstaller

Canada and Sweden have longstanding interstate relations. They are founding members of the AC and have positive cultural and economic relations. In addition, there are more than 300,000 Canadians of Swedish descent. The relationship is backed with many mutual treaties, and sees moderate foreign direct investment and trade.

== History ==
Sweden opened a consulate in Montreal by decision on 26 October 1906, with a district covering British North America excluding British Columbia. The consulate was converted into a consul general in 1916. In August 1943, the Swedish government decided to establish a diplomatic mission in Ottawa and close the consulate general in Montreal. The Swedish consul general in Montreal Per Wijkman was appointed as Swedish first envoy in Canada. On 4 August 1943, Wijkman presented his credentials to Governor-General Alexander Cambridge, 1st Earl of Athlone.

A Canadian legation was established in Stockholm on 21 March 1947. The first Canadian envoy was appointed on 9 February 1949. The Canadian legation was raised to the status of embassy on 16 March 1956.

One driver of positive relations are a 330,000 person population in Canada of Swedish descent, especially in the Canadian prairie provinces, Yukon Territory and British Columbia.

== Shared organizational membership ==
Both developed Western countries, Sweden and Canada have significant overlap in organizational membership. Both are full members of the AC. Both have ratified membership and were founding members of the OECD. Canada and Sweden shared non-permanent seats on the United Nations Security Council in 1958. Both Canada and Sweden are full members of NATO since March 2024. Canada was the first country to ratify Sweden's ascension into NATO.

And Canada is Observer bureau of the BEAC while Sweden is a member.

== Economic relations ==
Significant trade relations exist between the two countries. Canada imported $2 billion of Swedish goods in 2020, and exported $0.4 billion, both slightly down from recent years. Foreign direct investment from Sweden into Canada was $2.3 billion in 2020 and Canadian investment in Sweden the same year was $7.6 billion. Major Swedish exports to Canada include chemical products, machinery and electronic equipment, while Canadian exports to Sweden are driven by mineral products, and machinery and electronics,

Swedish suppliers have recently been a subject of interest in the Canadian national security context. Through the early 2020s, Canada is considering whether to permit Chinese technology company Huawei to provide 5G cellular services in Canada. Swedish company Ericsson is often posited as the main alternative technology provider in the case of a ban, and was selected by all three major Canadian telecom companies as their technology provider. After a cancellation of a single-bid contract made by a former Prime Minister, Canadian Prime Minister Justin Trudeau launched a new procurement process. In the bid to replace Canada's CF-18 fleet, Swedish aerospace company Saab's Gripen fighter was one of three long-listed fighters for replacement, and remains one of two fighters under final consideration, alongside American aerospace conglomerate Lockheed Martin's F-35 Lightning II.

== Diplomatic relations ==
Canada—Sweden relations could be characterized as warm based on frequent joint statements and bilateral meetings of a co-operative nature. King Carl XVI Gustaf paid a state visit to Governor General Jeanne Sauvé 14–19 March 1988 and to Governor General Michaëlle Jean 24–27 October 2006. State visits to Sweden was made on 18–20 May 1981 by Governor General Edward Schreyer and 20–23 February 2017 by Governor General David Johnston.

In 2006, the Canadian Prime Minister, Stephen Harper received King Carl XVI Gustaf and Queen Silvia of Sweden in Ottawa, Canada's capital. In 2021, Canadian minister of International Trade, the Honourable Mary Ng had a meeting with Swedish minister of Foreign Trade, Anna Hallberg.

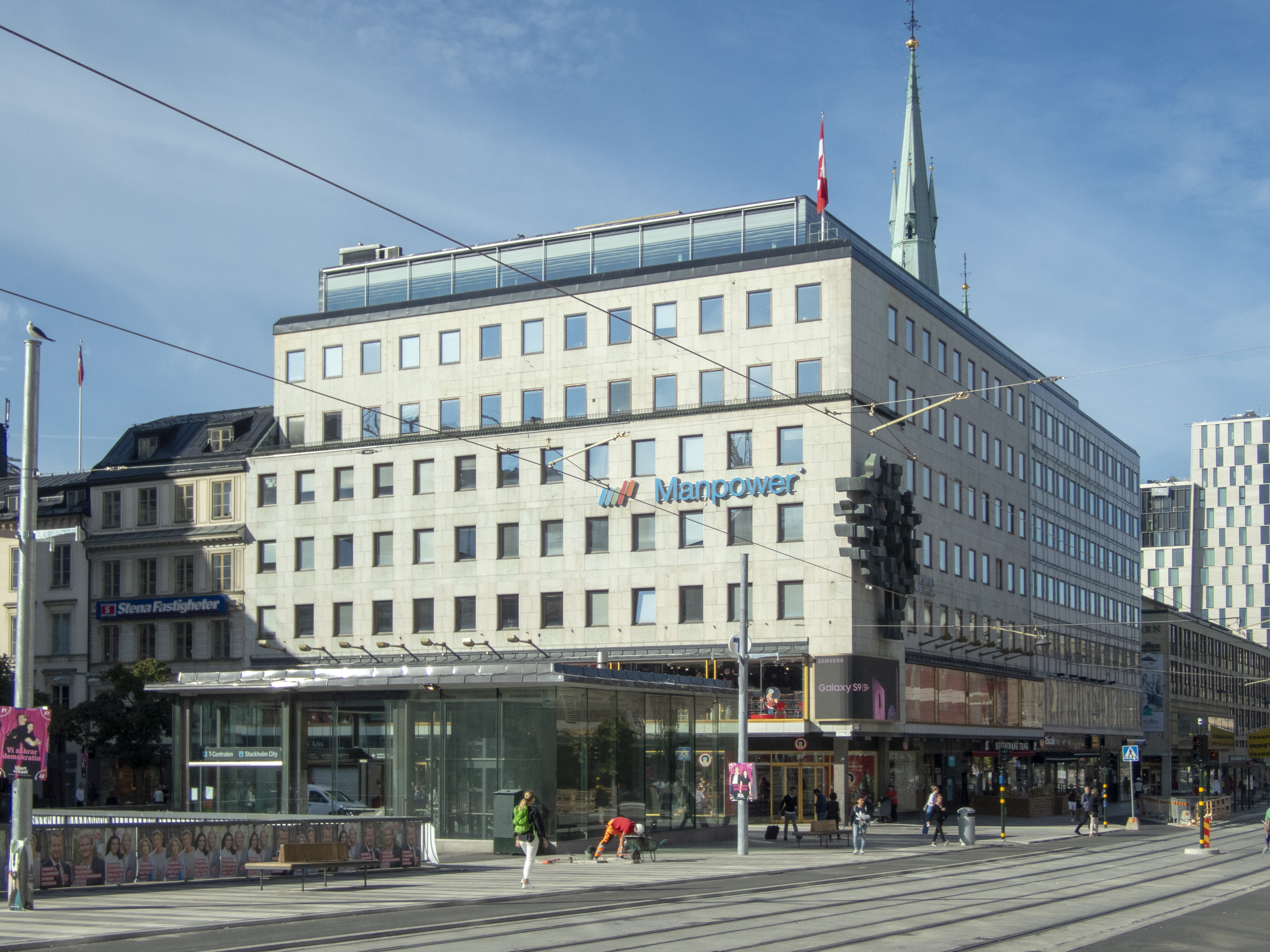
Canada's Embassy in Stockholm, Sweden

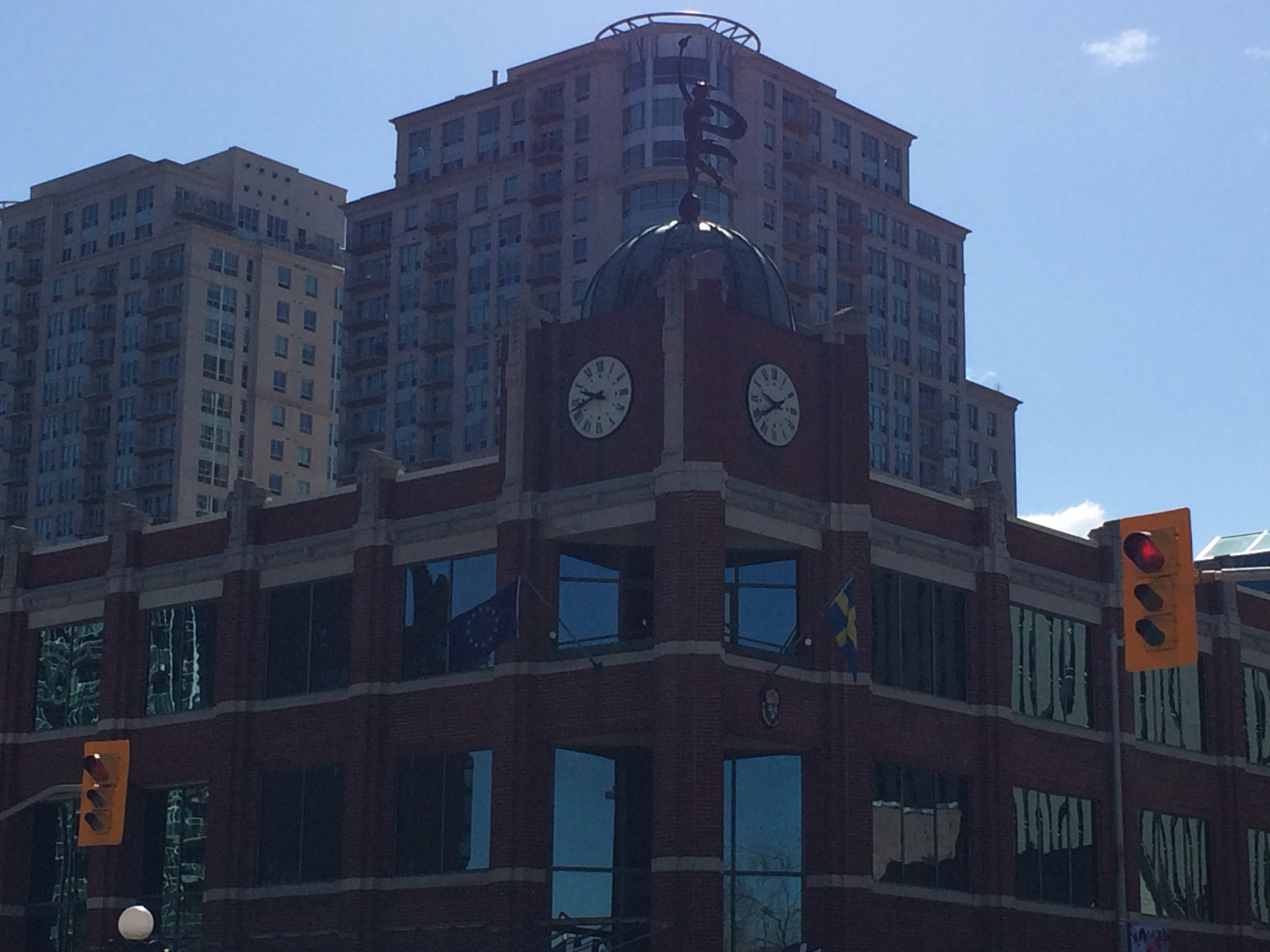
The Swedish embassy in Ottawa, Canada

Canada has an embassy in Stockholm and honorary consulates in Gothenburg and Malmö. Sweden has an embassy in Ottawa and honorary consulates in Calgary, Edmonton, Fredericton, Halifax, Montreal, Quebec City, Regina, Toronto, Vancouver and Winnipeg. Sweden previously had a career consulate general in Montreal (1906–1943, 1953–1993), a consulate general in Toronto (1991–1993) and a consulate in Vancouver (1983–1991).

Canadians and Swedes were both affected by the Iranian downing of Flight PS752, and joined with the United Kingdom and Ukraine in a joint statement calling on the Iranian government to allow access to international investigators after initial findings by Iranian officials were inconclusive as to the cause of the crash.

Canada and Sweden share a tax treaty and an extradition treaty, among 39 others, including social security, visas, air services and commercial matters. Canada's trade relationship with Sweden is predominantly governed by the Comprehensive Economic and Trade Agreement.

On a municipal level, at least two Canadian and Swedish cities are twinned. The Swedish city of Leksand is paired with the Canadian city of Aurora, Ontario, and the Canadian city of Saskatoon is paired with the Swedish city of Umeå.

== Cultural and other relationships ==
Both countries have interdisciplinary research programs studying each other's cultural groups. Canada has Scandinavian studies at at least four universities, with Swedish focuses at the University of Alberta, University of British Columbia, and University of Toronto. Sweden has Canadian studies courses available at Stockholm University.

Both countries are seen as having feminist foreign policy, with Sweden being the earliest adopter, and Canada following soon after, both countries bolstering feminist movements and programs geared to women abroad. Both countries have been criticized for arms sales to Saudi Arabia, whose government has non-feminist tendencies. Sweden cancelled a major arms deal with Saudi Arabia in 2016, but weapons have since been reported as being have used in the Yemeni Civil War (2014–present), in which the Saudi Arabian backed Cabinet of Yemen which have fought the Houthis alongside Saudi forces and air support

== See also ==
- Foreign relations of Canada
- Foreign relations of Sweden
- Canada-EU relations
- NATO-EU relations
- Comprehensive Economic and Trade Agreement
- Swedish Canadian
