= List of ambassadors of Sweden to Canada =

Ambassador of Sweden to Canada
- Lesser coat of arms of the Kingdom of Sweden

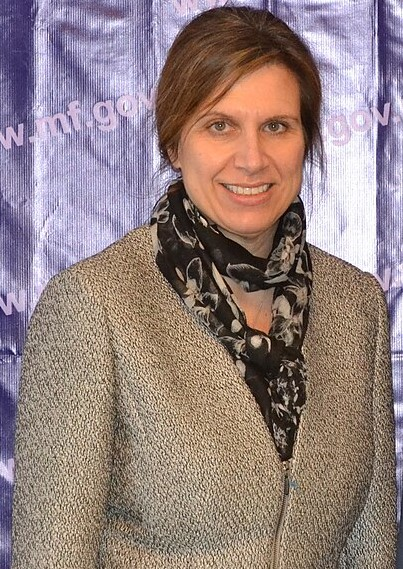
- Incumbent; Signe Burgstaller since 1 September 2023
- Ministry for Foreign Affairs; Swedish Embassy, Ottawa
- Style: His or Her Excellency (formal); Mr. or Madam Ambassador (informal)
- Reports to: Minister for Foreign Affairs
- Residence: 700 Manor Avenue, Rockcliffe Park
- Seat: Ottawa, Canada
- Appointer: Government of Sweden
- Term length: No fixed term
- Inaugural holder: Per Wijkman
- Formation: 1943
- Website: Swedish Embassy, Ottawa

The Ambassador of Sweden to Canada (known formally as the Ambassador of the Kingdom of Sweden to Canada) is the official representative of the government of Sweden to the governor general and government of Canada.

== History ==
In August 1943, the Swedish government decided to establish a diplomatic mission in Ottawa and close the Consulate General of Sweden, Montreal. The Swedish consul general in Montreal Per Wijkman was appointed as Swedish first envoy in Canada. On 4 August 1943, Wijkman presented his credentials to Governor-General Alexander Cambridge, 1st Earl of Athlone.

In March 1956, an agreement was reached between the Swedish and Canadian governments on the mutual elevation of the respective countries' legations to embassies. The diplomatic rank was thereafter changed to ambassador instead of envoy extraordinary and minister plenipotentiary.

In March 1978, Per Anger became the first Swedish ambassador to Canada to also be accredited in Nassau, Bahamas.

== List of representatives ==
Name	Period	Title	Resident / Concurrent accreditation	Notes	Presented credentials	Ref
Per Wijkman	1943–1951	Envoy				
Klas Böök	1951–1956	Envoy				
Oscar Thorsing	1956–1962	Ambassador				
Olof Ripa	1957–1958	Chargé d'affaires ad interim				
Ragnvald Bagge	1962–1965 (Note: Some sources state that Bagge was ambassador to Ottawa from 1963 and others say 1962. Bagge submitted his letter of credence in February 1963 but was appointed ambassador in November 1962.)	Ambassador				
Per Lind	1965–1969	Ambassador				
Åke Malmaeus	1969–1976	Ambassador				
Per Anger	1976–1979	Ambassador	Also accredited to Nassau (from 1978)			
Kaj Björk	1980–1984	Ambassador	Also accredited to Nassau	Political appointee (non-career diplomat)		
Ola Ullsten	1984–1989	Ambassador	Also accredited to Nassau	Political appointee (non-career diplomat)		
Håkan Berggren	1989–1995	Ambassador	Also accredited to Nassau			
Jan Ståhl	1995–2000	Ambassador	Also accredited to Nassau			
Lennart Alvin	2000–2005	Ambassador	Also accredited to Nassau			
Ingrid Iremark	3 October 2005 – 2010	Ambassador	Also accredited to Nassau			
Teppo Tauriainen	2010–2014	Ambassador			23 September 2010	
Per Sjögren	2014–2019	Ambassador			2 October 2014	
Urban Ahlin	February 2019 – 2023	Ambassador		Political appointee (non-career diplomat)	13 February 2019	
Signe Burgstaller	1 September 2023 – present	Ambassador			17 November 2023	

== See also ==
- Canada–Sweden relations
- Embassy of Sweden, Ottawa
