= Kaj Björk =

Swedish politician and diplomat

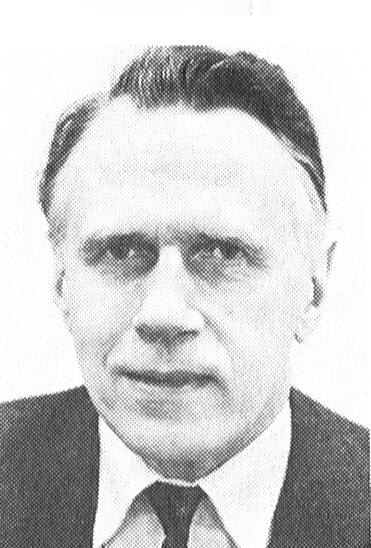
- Born: Kaj Åke Björk; 25 December 1918; Gothenburg, Sweden
- Died: 30 September 2014 (aged 95); Stockholm, Sweden
- Resting place: Galärvarvskyrkogården
- Education: Stockholm University College
- Occupation: Diplomat
- Years active: 1942–1984
- Political party: Swedish Social Democratic Party
- Spouse(s): Marja Friberg (m. 1940, divorced) Suzanne Székely (m. 1952, divorced) Claude Duvivier (m. 1963)
- Children: 3

Kaj Åke Björk (25 December 1918 – 30 September 2014) was a Swedish social democratic politician and a diplomat.

== Early life ==
Björk was born on 25 December 1918 in Gothenburg, Sweden, the son of Adolf Björk and his wife Eva (née Jancke). He was the youngest of five siblings and his father died barely a year later, and the mother was left to cope with the family's livelihood on her teacher's salary. The family belonged to Gothenburg culture radical circles and Björk became politically active already in high school. He passed studentexamen in 1936 and studied economics at Stockholm University College, but most of his time was devoted to intense political activity. Björk obtained his Bachelor of Arts degree in 1941.

== Career ==
Björk worked for Morgon-Tidningen from 1942 to 1946. Björk was international secretary of the Swedish Social Democratic Party from 1947 to 1955, and went to serve as the secretary of the parliamentary faction of the party 1955 to 1956. From 1948 to 1960 he represented the Swedish Social Democratic Party in the general council of the Socialist International.

Björk was the editor of Tiden between 1951 and 1956 and became editor-in-chief to the newspaper Ny Tid in Gothenburg 1956-63. Björk became an expert at the Ministry for Foreign Affairs in 1964 and was a member of the Riksdag from 1965 to 1973 (Andra kammaren 1965-66, Första kammaren 1966-70) and vice chairman of the Committee on Cultural Affairs 1971-72. He was chairman of the Inter-Parliamentary Group of the Riksdag from 1965 to 1973 and chairman of Swedish delegation of the Council of Europe from 1967 to 1973. Björk was also chairman of the 1968 Literature Inquiry (1968 års litteraturutredning) and a member of the Integration Safety Committee (Integrationsskyddskommittén).

He became ambassador in 1972 and was appointed ambassador in Beijing in 1975. The same year he became non-resident ambassador in Pyongyang. In 1976 Björk, then the Swedish ambassador to the People's Republic of China, took part in a delegation visit to Kampuchea. He was one of few Western diplomats to visit Kampuchea during the Khmer Rouge rule. Björk left Beijing in 1980 and became ambassador in Ottawa (also accredited to Nassau) which he was until 1984. Knowledge and opinion also characterizes the books about international relations and Swedish foreign policy that he published during the period as a journalist and later after his retirement. After retirement he also took up his old interest in history, which led to a major commitment in the Workers Cultural Society (Arbetarnas Kulturhistoriska Sällskap).

== Personal life ==
In 1940 he married Marja Friberg (1918–1988), the daughter of Otto Friberg and Hilma Margareta Olsson. They divorced and in 1952 he married Suzanne Székely (1919–2003), the daughter of Moses Székely and Margit Kauffman. They divorced and in 1963 he married for the third time, to Claude Duvivier (born 1934), the daughter of Charles Duvivier and Marthe Durand. Björk had three children: Bo Tomas (born 1947) in his first marriage, Ann Katrin (born 1954) in his second marriage and Pia Désirée Marie (born 1966) in his third marriage.

== Death ==
Björk died on 30 September 2014. On 12 November 2014 he was interred and was buried at Galärvarvskyrkogården in Stockholm.

Diplomatic posts
Preceded by Arne Björnberg	Ambassador of Sweden to China; 1975–1980	Succeeded by Sten Sundfeldt
Preceded by Arne Björnberg	Ambassador of Sweden to North Korea; 1975–1979	Succeeded by Sten Sundfeldt
Preceded by Arne Björnberg	Ambassador of Sweden to Cambodia; 1975–1979	Succeeded by None (until 1993)
Preceded by Per Anger	Ambassador of Sweden to Canada; 1980–1984	Succeeded by Ola Ullsten
Preceded by Per Anger	Ambassador of Sweden to The Bahamas; 1980–1984	Succeeded by Ola Ullsten
