= Andreas Norlén =

Swedish politician (born 1973)

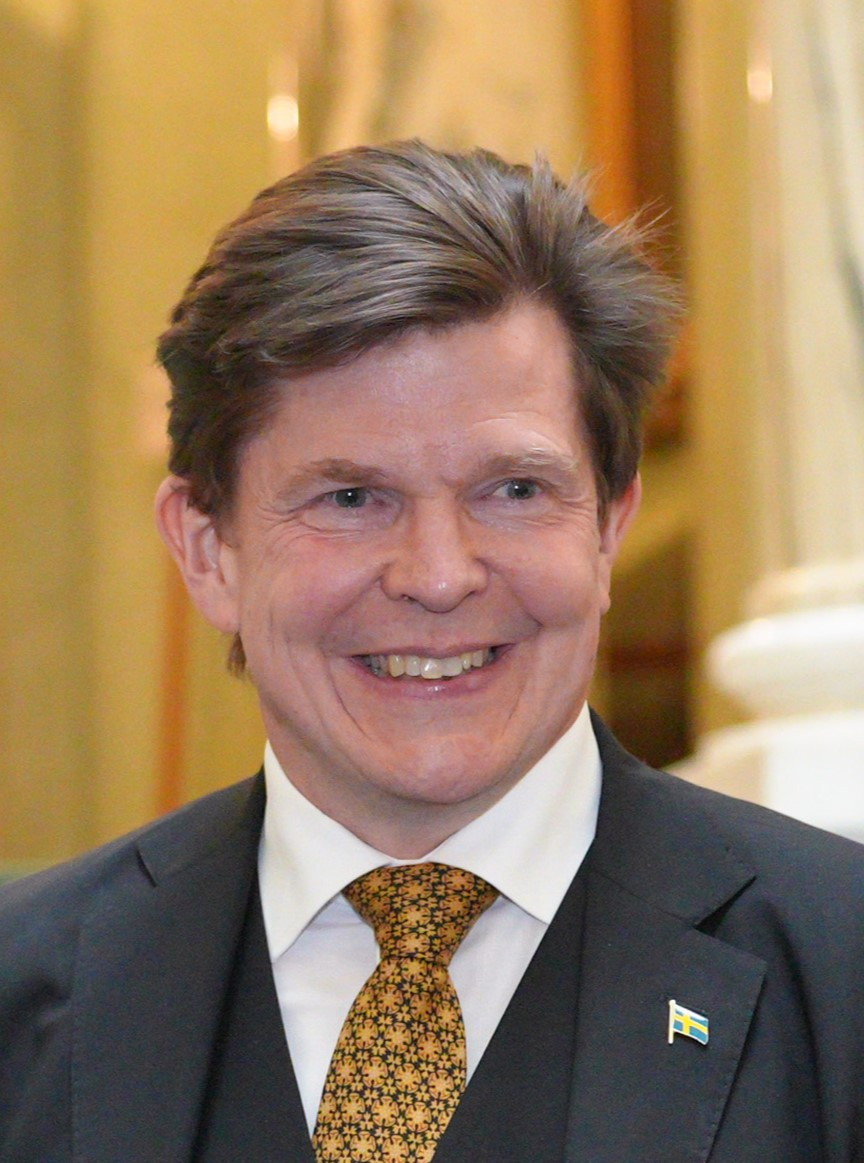
- Norlén in 2024

Speaker of the Riksdag
- Incumbent
- Assumed office 24 September 2018
- Monarch: Carl XVI Gustaf
- Preceded by: Urban Ahlin

Member of the Riksdag
- Incumbent
- Assumed office 2 October 2006
- Constituency: Östergötland County

Personal details
- Born: Per Olof Andreas Norlén; 6 May 1973 (age 53) Stockholm, Sweden
- Party: Moderate
- Spouse: Helena Kjellström (m. 2013)
- Children: 1
- Education: Stockholm University (LL.M); Linköping University (JD)

Per Olof Andreas Norlén (Swedish: [anˈdrêːas nʊˈɭeːn]; born 6 May 1973) is a Swedish politician who has served as Speaker of the Riksdag since 2018. A member of the Moderate Party (M), he has represented Östergötland County in the Riksdag since 2006. Norlén was previously chairman of the Committee on the Constitution from 2014 to 2018.

== Career ==
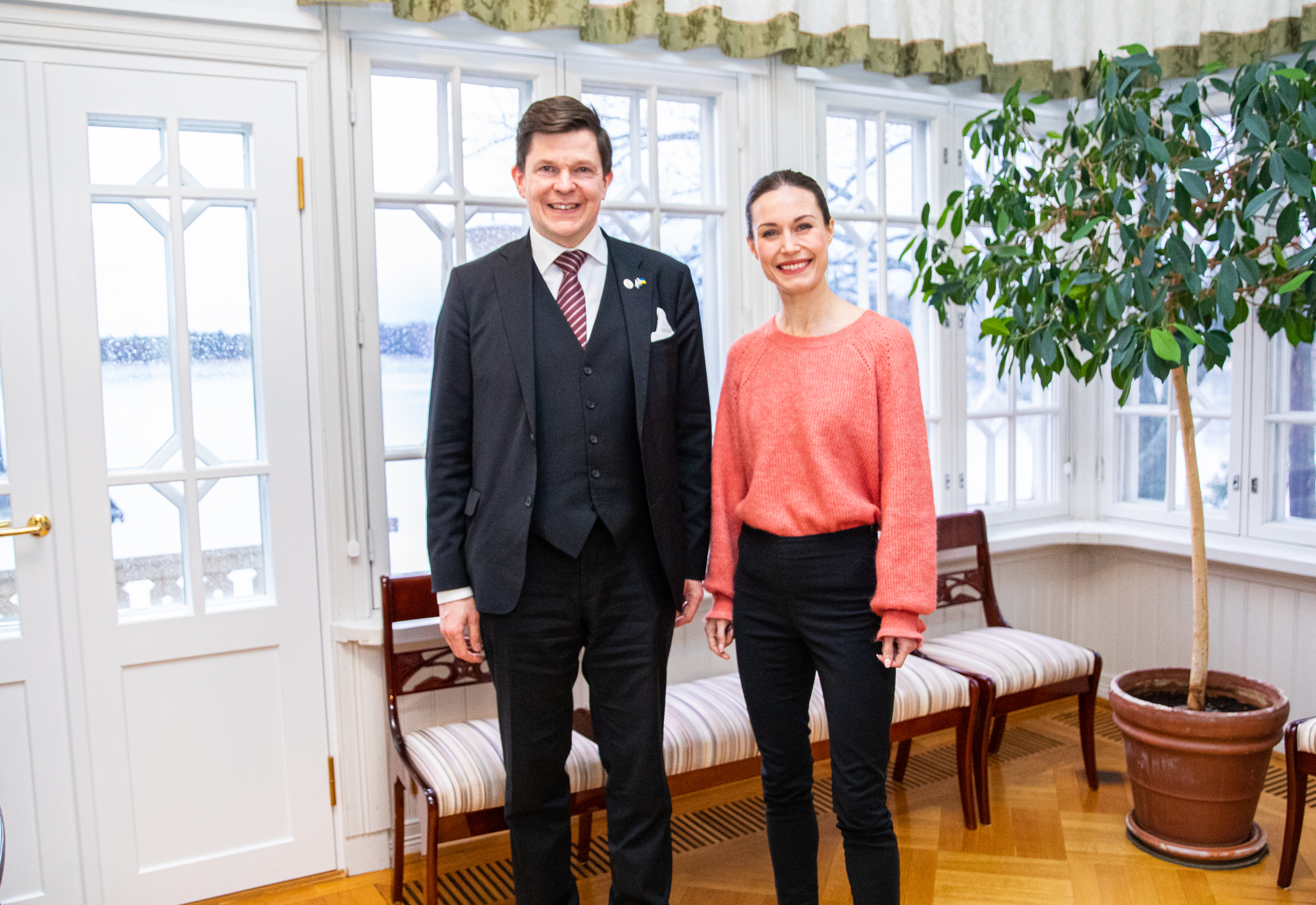
Norlén with Finnish Prime Minister Sanna Marin in Helsinki, on 16 January 2023

Following the first sitting of the Riksdag since the 2018 Swedish general election on 24 September, Norlén was elected the Speaker of the Riksdag. After the centre-left Löfven I Cabinet lost a vote of no confidence, Norlén began the task of nominating candidates for Stefan Löfven's successor as Prime Minister, according to the Swedish Instrument of Government. The lengthy work of finding a prime minister that could be tolerated by the Riksdag was concluded on 18 January 2019 when Löfven was appointed for a second term. Norlén was reelected as speaker of the Riksdag on 26 September 2022. He was re-elected to a third term on 28 September 2026.

After the 2022 general elections Norlén presided over the government formations once again. This time he tasked Ulf Kristersson with forming a government. The government formation that followed is one of the longest in Swedish history second only to the 2018–2019 formation, which also took place under Norléns speakership. On 17 October, he proposed that Kristersson be appointed Prime Minister and he was later approved by the Riksdag.

== Controversies ==
Andreas Norlén has had several controversies, most notably involving excessive public spending for personal benefit, e.g. taxpayers paying for his wife's travels, family members joining on foreign government trips and flying by private plane when commercial options were available.

== Honours ==
=== National honours ===
- Sweden: Swedish Veterans Association (Fredsbaskrarna) Medal of Merit in silver (29 May 2022)
- Sweden: Recipient of the Golden Jubilee Badge Medal of King Carl XVI Gustaf (15 September 2023)
- Sweden: Recipient of the Golden Wedding Medal of King Carl XVI Gustaf and Queen Silvia (13 June 2026)

=== Foreign honours ===
- Italy: Knight Grand Cross of the Order of Merit of the Italian Republic (14 January 2019)
- Germany: Grand Cross 1st class of the Order of Merit of the Federal Republic of Germany (7 September 2021)
- Spain: Knight Grand Cross of the Order of Isabella the Catholic (16 November 2021)
- Finland: Grand Cross of the Order of the White Rose of Finland (17 May 2022)
- Netherlands: Grand Cross of the Order of Orange-Nassau (11 October 2022)
- France: Grand Officer of the Order of the Legion of Honour (30 January 2024)
- Denmark: Grand Cross of the Order of the Dannebrog (6 May 2024)
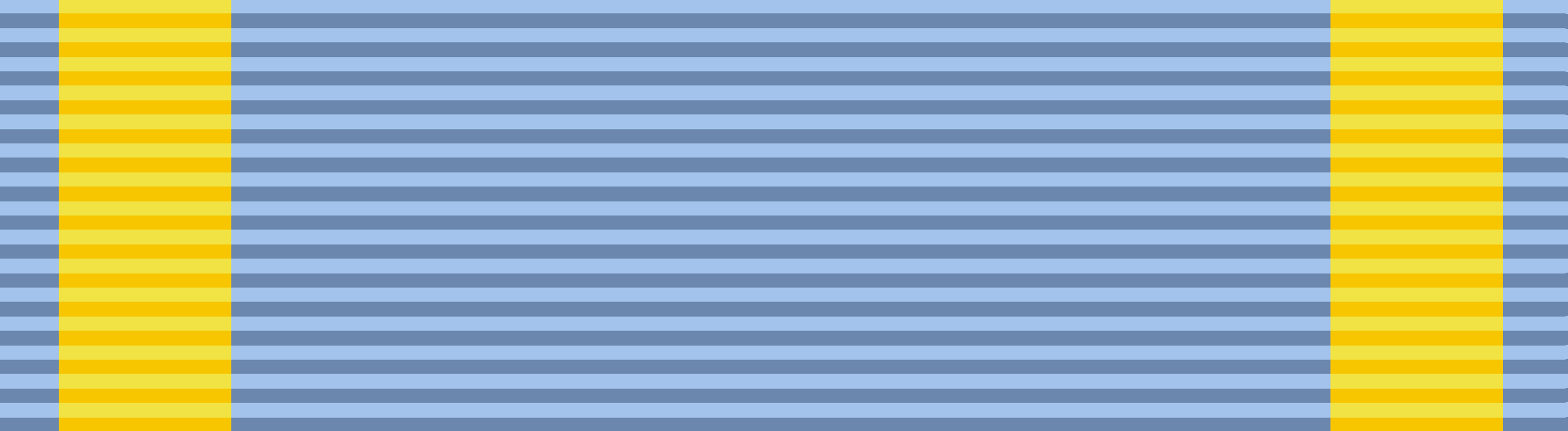
- Ukraine: Second Class of the Order of Prince Yaroslav the Wise (31 April 2025)
- Iceland: Grand Cross of the Order of the Falcon (6 May 2025)

=== Honorary degrees ===
- 2025 – Honorary Doctorate, Linköping University

Political offices
| Preceded by Peter Eriksson | Chairman of the Constitution Committee; 2014–2018 | Succeeded by Hans Ekström |
| Preceded by Urban Ahlin | Speaker of the Riksdag; 2018–present | Incumbent |
Order of precedence
| Preceded by Princess Christina as Princess of Sweden | Swedish order of precedence Speaker of the Riksdag | Succeeded by Ulf Kristersson as Prime Minister |
