= Rita Mahato =

Women's rights activist

Rita Mahato (Nepali: रीता महतो) is a Nepali women's rights activist. She works for the Women's Rehabilitation Centre (WOREC) and received the Per Anger Prize in 2014.

== Early life ==
Rita Mahato was subject to a forced marriage at the age of 14. She had her first child one year later and experienced domestic violence from her spouse.

== Career ==
Mahato works for the Women's Rehabilitation Centre (WOREC) in Siraha district. The group assists survivors of sexual violence. In June 2007, after WOREC had supported two survivors of rape, some members of the local community intimidated Mahato. The office where Mahato worked was attacked and she was seriously threatened by a group of men. She was then supported by the International Federation for Human Rights, the World Organisation Against Torture and Amnesty International.

Mahato received the Per Anger Prize in 2014 for her activism against sexual violence. She won 15,000 euros, which she said she would put towards founding an old people's home.
