= Urban Ahlin =

Swedish politician (born 1964)

Urban Ahlin MP
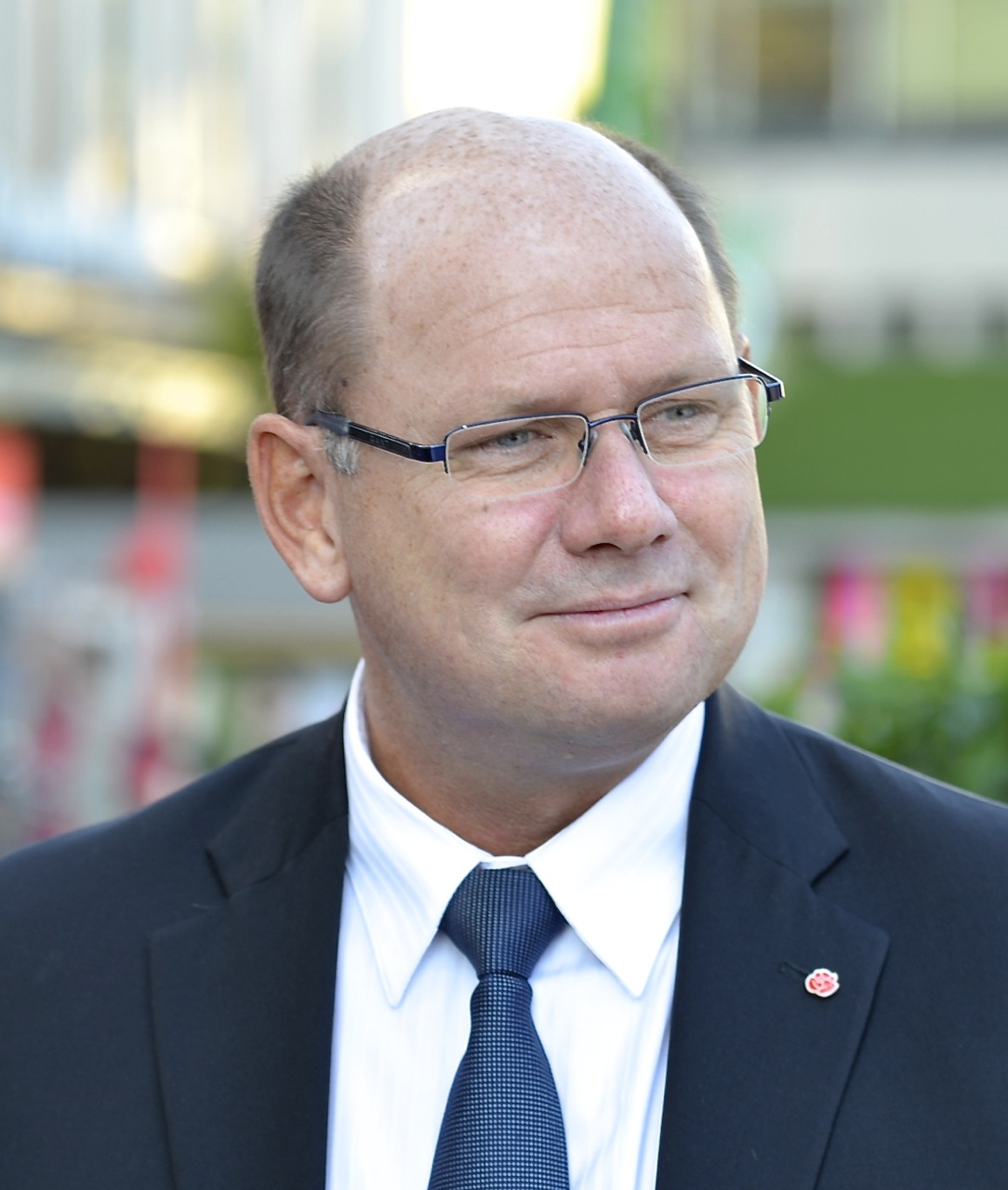
- Ahlin in 2014

Ambassador of Sweden to the United States
- Incumbent
- Assumed office 15 August 2023
- Monarch: Carl XVI Gustaf
- Preceded by: Karin Olofsdotter

Ambassador of Sweden to Canada
- In office February 2019 – 14 August 2023
- Monarch: Carl XVI Gustaf
- Preceded by: Per Sjögren
- Succeeded by: Signe Burgstaller

Speaker of the Riksdag
- In office 29 September 2014 – 24 September 2018
- Monarch: Carl XVI Gustaf
- Preceded by: Per Westerberg
- Succeeded by: Andreas Norlén

Member of the Riksdag
- In office 3 October 1994 – 24 September 2018
- Constituency: Västra Götaland County East

Personal details
- Born: Urban Christian Ahlin; 13 November 1964 (age 61) Mariestad, Sweden
- Party: Social Democratic
- Spouse: Jenni Ahlin (m. 1999)
- Children: 1
- Education: Karlstad University

Urban Christian Ahlin (Swedish: [ˈɵ̌rːban aˈliːn]; born 13 November 1964) is a Swedish diplomat and former politician of the Swedish Social Democratic Party. He currently serves as Ambassador of Sweden to the United States since 2023.

Ahlin served as Member of the Riksdag (MP) for the Västra Götaland County East constituency from 1994 to 2018 and was Speaker of the Riksdag (Parliament of Sweden) from September 2014 to September 2018. He was Ambassador of Sweden to Canada from 2019 to 2023.

== Education and career ==
Ahlin was born in Mariestad, Skaraborg County, Sweden. From 1981 to 1982, and again from 1984 to 1985, he was chairman of the local branch of the Swedish Social Democratic Youth League in Mariestad. Between 1985 and 1990 he was chairman of the Social Democratic Youth League in Skaraborg County. Between 1991 and 1998 he was chairman of the Social Democratic Party in Mariestad, Skaraborg County, and between 1999 and 2002 he was the deputy secretary general of the Social Democratic Party. Since 2005 he is chairman of the Social Democratic Party in Skaraborg County.

Between 1985 and 1990 Ahlin studied at the specialist teacher-training course at Karlstad University. He then worked as a teacher at an upper level elementary school in Mariestad, teaching mathematics and general science, until being elected to the Swedish parliament in 1994.

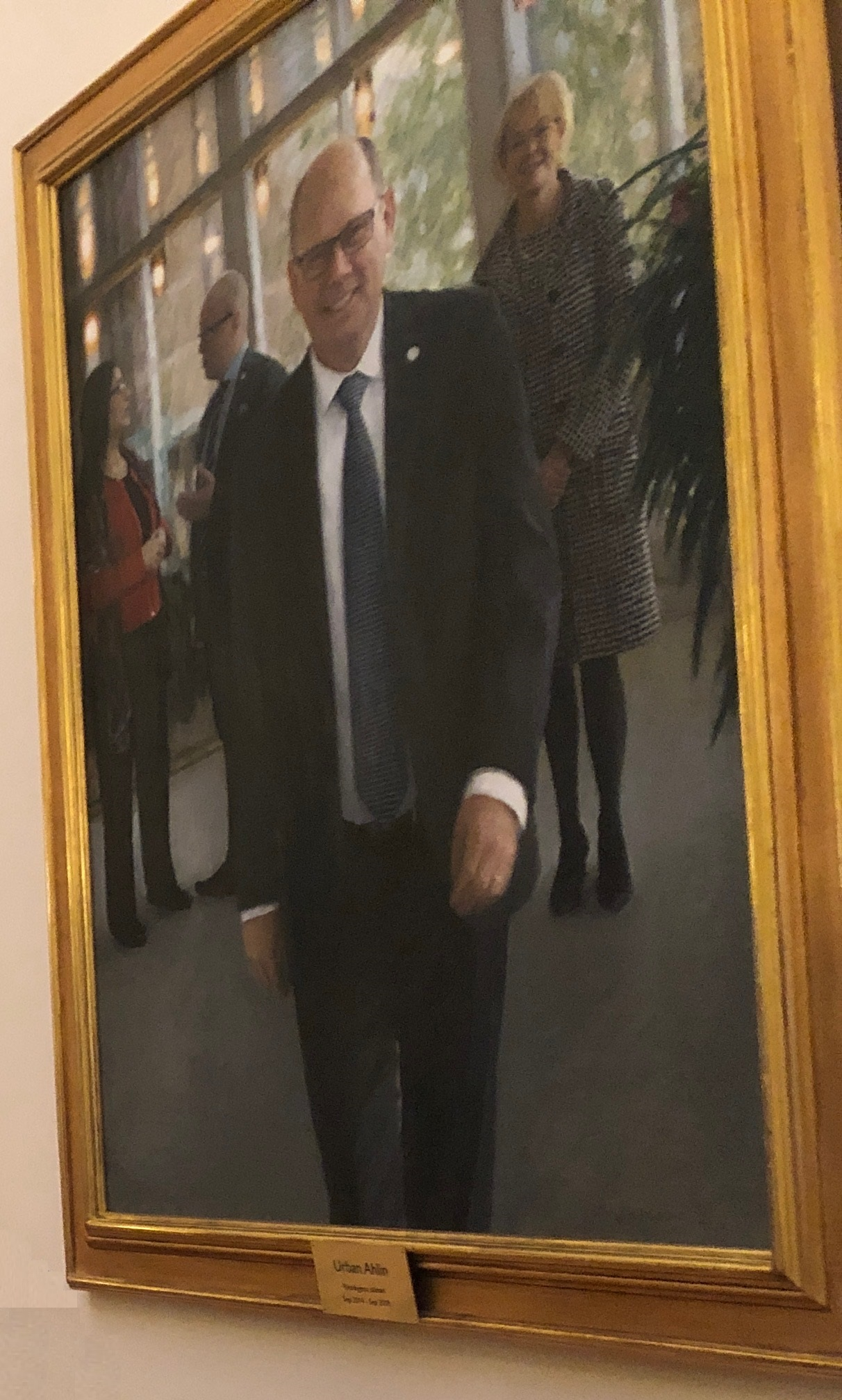
Official portrait of the Speaker of the Riksdag for Urban Ahlin. He became the first speaker to include the three deputy speakers of his term in his portrait. Ewa Thalén Finné, Björn Söder, Esabelle Dingizian

Between 2002 and 2006 Ahlin was chairman of the Committee on Foreign Affairs in the Swedish parliament. From 2006 to 2014, after the Social Democrats lost power in the 2006 election, he was deputy chairman of the Committee on Foreign Affairs. During this time, Urban Ahlin was the Foreign Policy spokesperson for the Social Democrats in the Swedish Parliament. In Parliament he held a number of different positions. He was a member of the Advisory Council on Foreign Affairs, a member of the War Delegation, and a deputy member of the Committee on European Union Affairs. He was also a member of the party board of the Social Democratic Party.

He has been the chair of the Socialist group in the OSCE PA, the Parliamentary Assembly of the Organization for Security and Co-operation in Europe. He is at the moment the deputy chair of the Swedish delegation to NATO Parliamentary Assembly

Following the 2014 election, on 29 September 2014 Ahlin was elected Speaker of the Riksdag for the period 2014-2018. He succeeded Per Westerberg in that post.

== Successful mediator ==
Urban Ahlin has been engaged in many mediations and negotiations. In 2007 he managed after extensive meetings and talks to get two Swedish construction workers out from the Iranian prison, Evin, in Tehran. He was the backchannel between Belarus and United States in negotiating the release of the imprisoned presidential candidate in Belarus, Alexander Kozulin. Kozulin was eventually released. Urban Ahlin was also the person behind the scene in the work to release the hostage at the headquarters of the Social Democratic Party in Stockholm. The staff had been taken hostage by a group of young members of PKK as a protest after the arrest of their leader Öcalan. Urban Ahlin was the channel talking directly to the youngsters making them to give up after Ahlin gave a promise to attend the court hearings in Turkey. Which he later did together with the former Swedish minister Carl Lidbom.

== Other organisations ==
Urban Ahlin is and has been a member of many different non-profit organisations. He is a founding member of the European Council on Foreign Relations ECFR. He is also a member of the Swedish group of Trilateral Commission. He has been a director of the influential American "think and do tank" EastWest Institute. Urban Ahlin regularly participates in programs and seminars organised by The Aspen Institute, German Marshall Fund GMF and Council on Foreign Relationsin Washington DC. Urban Ahlin is also a member of the International Advisory Board of the James Martin Center for Nonproliferations Studies, CSN at the Monterey Institute of International Studies in Monterey, CA.

== Honours and decorations ==
=== National honours ===
- (Sweden) H. M. The King's Medal, 12th size in gold on chain (6 June 2026)

=== Foreign honours ===
- Order for Merits to Lithuania (2005)

Political offices
Preceded by Viola Furubjelke	Chairman of the Committee on Foreign Affairs; 2002–2006	Succeeded by Sten Tegelfors
Preceded by Gunilla Carlsson	Deputy Chairman of the Committee on Foreign Affairs; 2006–2014	Succeeded by Karin Enström
Preceded by Per Westerberg	Speaker of the Riksdag; 2014–2018	Succeeded by Andreas Norlén
Diplomatic posts
Preceded by Per Sjögren	Ambassador of Sweden to Canada; 2019–2023	Succeeded by Signe Burgstaller
Preceded by Karin Olofsdotter	Ambassador of Sweden to the United States; 2023–present	Incumbent
Order of precedence
Preceded by Per Westerberg as former Speaker of the Riksdag	Swedish order of precedence as former Speaker of the Riksdag	Succeeded by Ingvar Carlsson as former Prime Minister
