= Swedish diaspora =

Swedish emigrants and their descendants

Countries with significant Swedish population and descendants. Sweden + 1,000,000 + 100,000 + 10,000 + 1,000

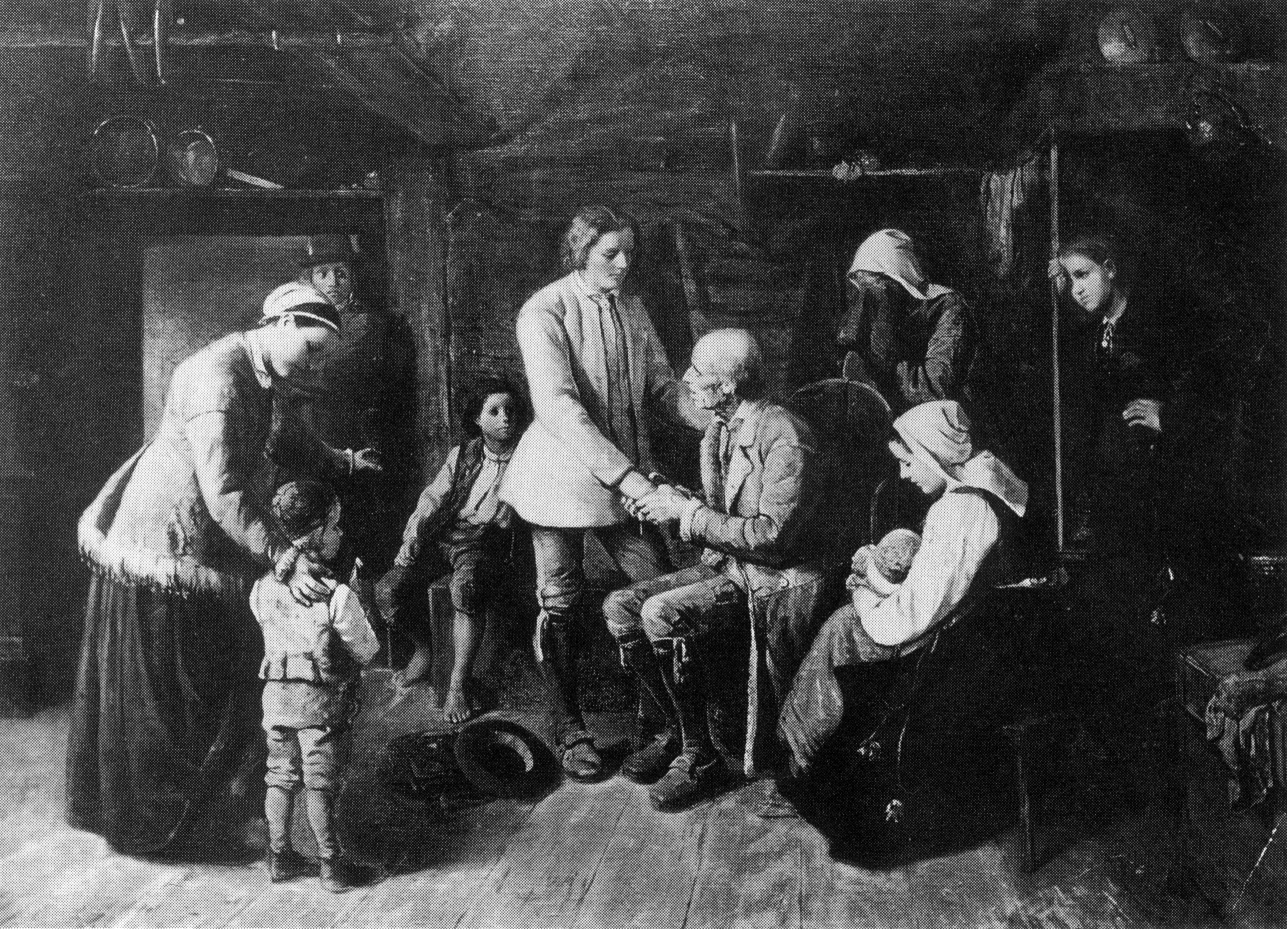
The Emigrants by S. V. Helander (1839–1901): a young Swedish farmer says farewell of friends and relatives before emigrating

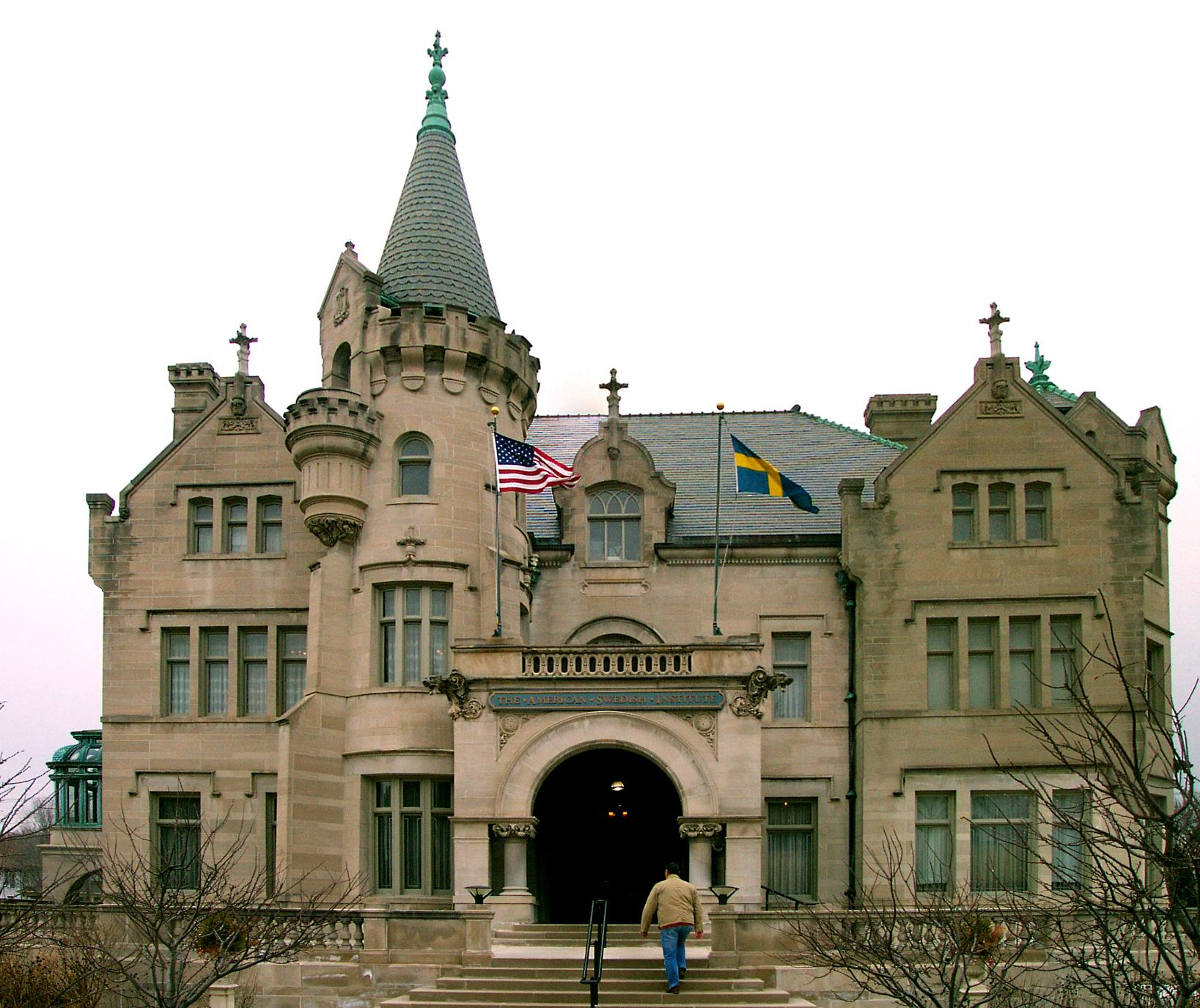
The American Swedish Institute in Minneapolis, Minnesota, United States

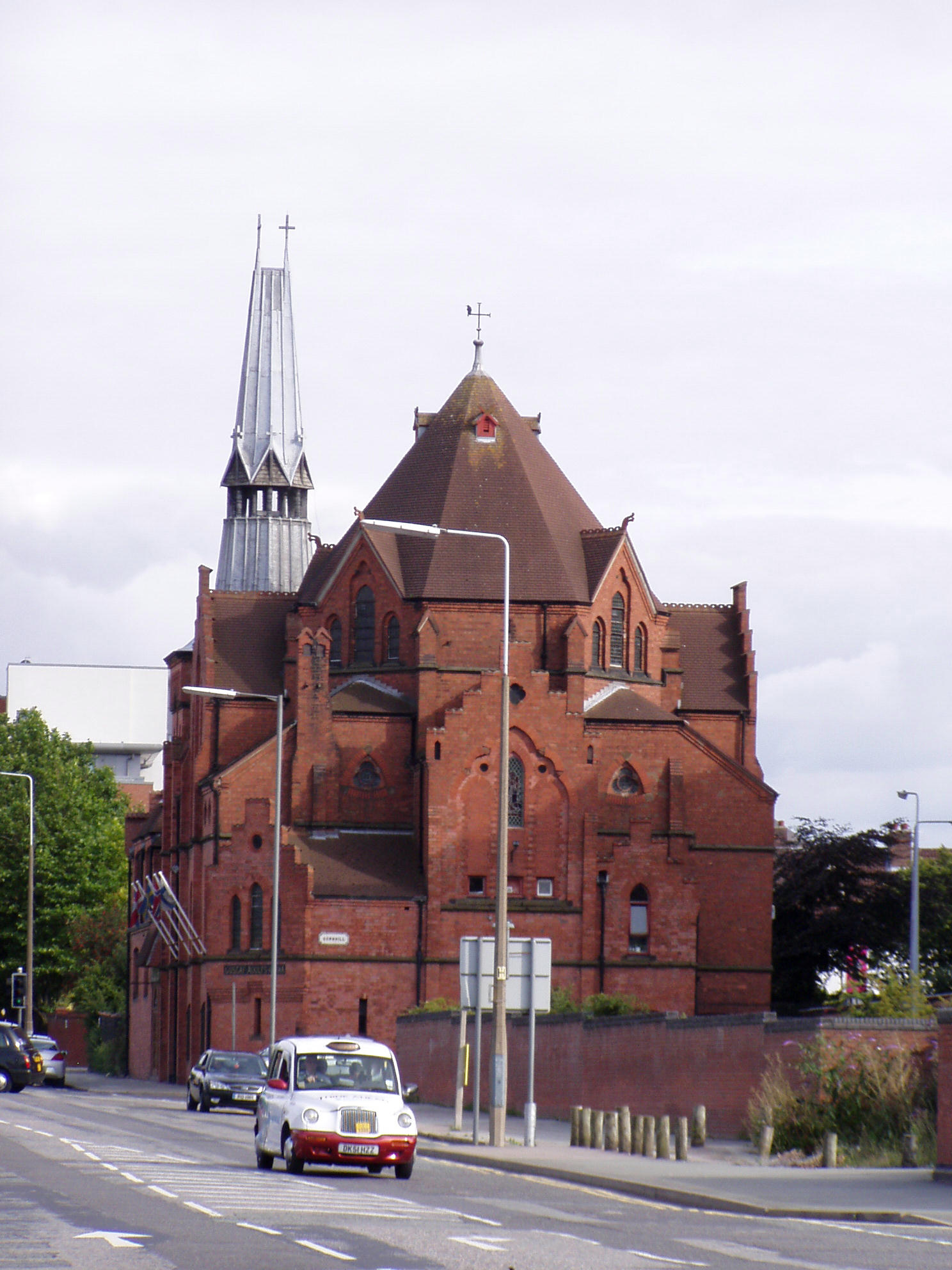
The Gustav Adolf Church in Liverpool, the oldest surviving Swedish church in the United Kingdom

The Swedish diaspora consists of emigrants and their descendants, especially those that maintain some of the customs of their Swedish culture. Notable Swedish communities exist in the United States, Argentina, Australia, Canada, New Zealand, Brazil, and the United Kingdom as well as others.

== History ==
The New Sweden Company established a colony on the Delaware River in 1638, naming it New Sweden. The colony was lost to the Dutch in 1655, but the colonists were allowed to remain.

Between 1846 and 1930, roughly 1.3 million people, about 20% of the Swedish population, left the country, largely for economic reasons.

In the United States members of the diaspora had access to Swedish films starting in 1922 with The Treasure of Arne which was shown in Minneapolis, Minnesota. Some films were made just for the Swedish American diaspora community such as The Film About Sweden and The Old Land of Dreams.

The first recognition by Sweden of the 19th century emigration to the United States occurred in 1923 with a visit by Nathan Söderblom and the 1926 visit by the crown prince, who would later rule as Gustaf VI Adolf of Sweden. He would visit again in 1938.

Swedish expatriates in Manhattan celebrate Midsummer as "a particularly grand example of the Swedish diaspora's ability to hold on to its culture while fully integrating on a global scale."

== Distribution ==
=== Finland ===
The Swedish-speaking Finns or Finland-Swedes form a minority group in Finland. The characteristic of this minority is debated: while some see it as an ethnic group of its own some view it purely as a linguistic minority. The group includes about 285,360 people, comprising 4.9% of the population of mainland Finland, or 5% if the 26,000 inhabitants of Åland are included (there are also about 60,000 Swedish-speaking Finns currently resident in Sweden). It has been presented that the ethnic group can also be perceived as a distinct Swedish-speaking nationality in Finland. There are also 9,000 Swedish citizens living in Finland.

=== Germany ===
Approximately 23,000 Swedes live in Germany.

=== Estonia ===
The presence of Swedish-speaking permanent residents in the area of present-day Estonia (Estonian Swedes, Swedish: estlandssvenskar) was first documented in the 14th century, and possibly dates back to the Viking Age. There were an estimated 12,000 Swedes resident in Estonia in 1563, mainly distributed along the coastal regions and islands. Estonia came under Swedish rule from 1558 to 1710, after which Stockholm ceded the territory to Russia in the 1721 Treaty of Nystad and the area became the Reval Governorate. In 1781, 1,300 Estonian Swedes of the island of Hiiumaa (Dagö) were forced to move to New Russia (today Ukraine) by Catherine II of Russia, where they formed Gammalsvenskby (Old Swedish Village). Some Estonian Swedes made careers in the Russian Tsarist system, like Adam Johann von Krusenstern.

According to the 1934 Estonian census, 7,641 Swedes (Swedish speakers, 0.7% of the population) lived in Estonia, making Swedes the third-largest national minority in Estonia (after Russians and Germans). From 1943, during World War II, almost the entire community of Estonian Swedes fled to Sweden. Today there are, at most, a few hundred Estonian Swedes living in Estonia and a few hundred in Russia and Ukraine, with the estimates varying widely depending on who identifies, or can be identified, as a Swede. Many of them live in northwestern mainland Estonia and on adjacent islands and on the island of Ruhnu (Runö) in the Gulf of Riga.

In a nationalist context, the ethnic Swedes living outside Sweden are sometimes called 'East-Swedes' (Swedish: östsvenskar), to distinguish them from the ethnic Swedes living in Sweden proper, called rikssvenskar.

=== France ===
Many Swedes spend their holidays in France especially in the South of France, small towns and villages. altogether totaling 28,724.

They live in Ile-de-France, Nord-Pas-de-Calais, Languedoc-Rousillon, Midi-Pyrenees, Brittany, Poitou-Charentes, Picardy, Upper Normandy, Lorraine, Alsace, Provence-Alpes-Cote d'Azur, Aquitaine, Pays de la Loire, Centre-Val de Loire and in the Gallic country.

=== Portugal ===
Many Swedes spend their holidays in Portugal and many Swedish pensioners have moved to the country in recent years. Official statistics suggest that 5,486 foreigners holding Swedish nationality (thus not taking into account 36 Swedes who have acquired Portuguese nationality since 2008 and descendants of immigrants, as well as people of more distant ancestry) live in Portugal. They live especially in the South (Algarve) and in Lisbon Region. Other estimates suggest that as many as 8,000 Swedes may be living in the country Notable Luso-Swedes include filmmaker Solveig Nordlund.

=== North America ===
There are numerous Swedish descendants in places like the United States and Canada (i.e. Swedish Americans and Swedish Canadians), including some who still speak Swedish.

The majority of the early Swedish immigrants to Canada came via the United States. It was not until after 1880 that significant numbers of Swedes immigrated to Canada. From WWI onwards, almost all of the Swedish immigrants entered Canada coming directly from Sweden. In addition to Swedish immigrants from south-central part of Sweden, a relatively large number of Swedish immigrants came from Stockholm and northern Sweden. The newcomers played an important role in the development of the Canadian prairies.

Swedish Canadians can be found in all parts of the country, but the largest population resides in British Columbia. Many Swedish social, cultural, political, business and welfare organizations, both religious and secular, can be found in all major Canadian cities and some of the smaller towns and rural communities. Some of the Swedish traditions, such as Midsummer, Walpurgis, and St Lucia are still celebrated by the community today.

=== South America ===
Dom Pedro II, the second Emperor of Brazil, encouraged immigration, resulting in a sizeable number of Swedes entering Brazil, settling mainly in the cities of Joinville and Ijuí. In the late 19th century, Misiones Province in Argentina was a major centre for Swedish immigration, and laid the foundations of a population of Swedish-Argentines.

There are also Swedish communities in Uruguay.

=== Oceania ===
Many Swedes settled in Australia and New Zealand. Organized immigration from Sweden occurred during the 19th century when Queensland and Tasmania invited immigrants to take up farming leases. Many people of Swedish descent can be found in these countries.

=== Asia ===
Thailand has about 15,000 Swedes residing there permanently.

=== United Kingdom ===
Scandinavian migration to Britain is a phenomenon that has occurred at different periods over the past 1,200 years.

== See also ==
- Swedish emigration to the United States
- Finnish diaspora
- Danish diaspora
- Norwegian diaspora
- Icelandic diaspora
