= Living History Forum =

Swedish government agency

Coordinates: 59°19′30″N 18°4′4.5″E

- Forum för levande historia

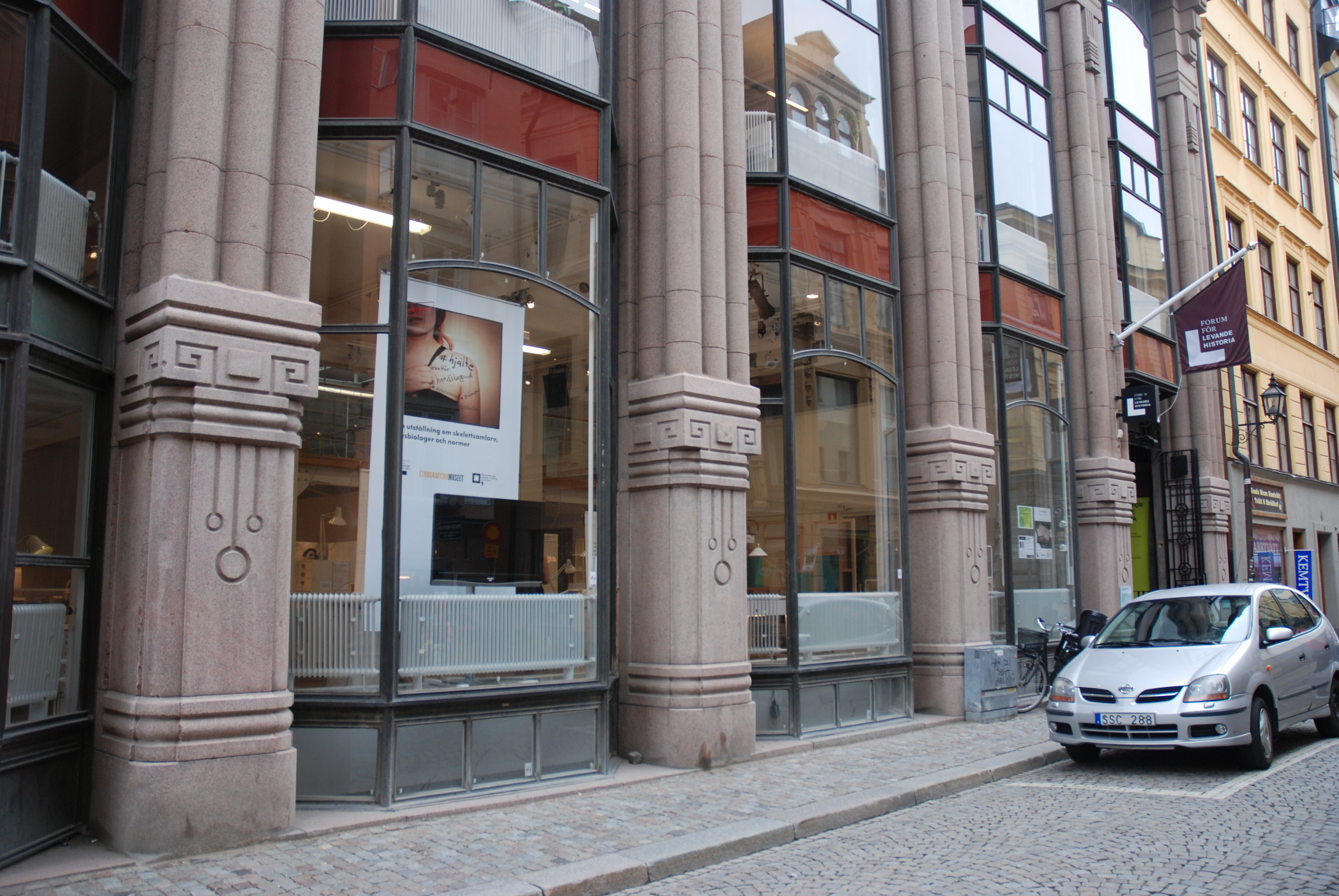
- Office and exhibition space of the Forum for Living History in the Gamla stan, Stockholm, Sweden

Agency overview
- Formed: January 1, 2003; 23 years ago
- Headquarters
- Employees: 35
- Annual budget: SEK 59 450 000 (2017)
- Minister responsible: Caroline Källner
- Parent agency: Ministry of Culture (Sweden)
- Website: www.levandehistoria.se

The Living History Forum (Swedish: Forum för levande historia) is a Swedish state administrative authority under the Ministry of Culture, established in 2003.

== Mission, background and activities ==
The Living History Forum is a government agency for the promotion of democracy, tolerance and human rights. The authority is mandated to strive to strengthen people's will to actively work for the equal value of all people. It produces investigations and factual material, shows exhibitions for schoolchildren and the general public and conducts information activities in general.

The authority was established in 2003. The origin of the authority was the information initiative Living History initiated by Göran Persson in June 1997. The background to this was in turn a report by the Center for Immigrant Research at Stockholm University and the Swedish National Council for Crime Prevention the same month. This report had concluded that 66% of Swedish young people surveyed had said they were "completely sure" that the Holocaust had taken place, 14% were "fairly sure", while 8% said they were "not at all sure" or "quite unsure".

Living history was a one-time effort and included the book ...About This You Should Learn...: A book about the Holocaust in Europe 1935-1945. The government later appointed an inquiry into how the activities could be made permanent and a parliamentary decision was made in December 2001 to establish an authority.

Heléne Lööw was the agency's first superintendent, until July 2006.

The Living History Forum has an office and exhibition space at Stora Nygatan 10 in the Old Town of Stockholm, a property designed by Erik Josephson and built in 1909–1912 for Skandinaviska Banken.

=== Superintendents ===
- 2003–2006 – Heléne Lööw
- 2006–2007 – Anna-Karin Johansson (t.f.)
- 2007–2014 – Eskil Franck
- 2014–2015 – Katarina Kristensson (t.f.)
- 2015–2021 Ingrid Lomfors
- 2021- Caroline Källner (t.f.)

== Selection of reports ==
- 2003 Intolerance Report
- 2006 Eva Tiby, together with Anna-Maria Sörby: A study of homophobic hate crimes in Sweden
- 2006 Henrik Bachner and Jonas Ring: Anti-Semitic attitudes and perceptions in Sweden
- 2006 Jonas Otterbäck and Pieter Bevelander: Report on Islamophobia
- 2008 Crimes Against Humanity Under Communist Regimes - in English
- 2010 The ambiguous intolerance
- 2011 Summary of anti-Semitism and Islamophobia submitted to the government
- 2011 Gypsy cultural and linguistic rights
- 2014 Time for tolerance
- 2016 Historical research on racism and xenophobia in Sweden
- 2017 The mechanisms of tolerance: an anthology

=== The report on antisemitism ===
The survey of antisemitism in Sweden attracted a great deal of attention. It was conducted as a survey of attitudes towards Jews and Judaism. Five percent of those surveyed between the ages of 16 and 75 expressed "strong and consistent anti-Semitic attitudes," 36 percent "a partially ambivalent attitude toward Jews," and 59 percent rejected antisemitic views. Prime Minister Göran Persson said he was frightened and surprised by this outcome.

The report's methodology met with criticism from three professors of political science at the University of Gothenburg, including Ulf Bjereld. The criticism was rejected by the report editors and commented upon by other researchers.

== Exhibitions ==
- 2003 Borders, in collaboration with Riksutställningar
- 2004 Balt extradition
- 2005–2006 The Prejudice Tour
- 2005–2008 Sweden and the Holocaust, produced by Roy Andersson
- 2007–2008 Anne Frank & Jag
- 2007–2009 Plays role
- 2008–2009 Little brother sees you, traveling exhibition
- 2009–2010 Dinner with Pol Pot, an exhibition about ideological blinders and selective vision
- 2010–2011 (O) human, an exhibition about racial biology and forced sterilization in Sweden. One part of two, the other part is displayed at the Ethnographic Museum.
- 2009–2011 PK – an exhibition about intolerance
- 2014 We are Roma – meet the people behind the myth
- 2015 All people! On rights and equal value
- 2015 70 years since the liberation
- 2016 Action T4 – on human vision in Nazi Germany
- 2017 Stamped
- 2017 Propaganda – risk of influence
- 2017 Never again! About genocide
- 2017 Gulag: That grandfather did not tell

== Expansion ==
After the parliamentary elections in 2006, the new government expanded its mandate to include the dissemination of information about crimes committed by communist regimes. The Forum for Living History has also been criticized by the Left Party, a Socialist organisation, among other things based on the idea that it is up to researchers and not state authorities to write history. In this view, the state should not be opinion-forming, but ideological debate should be conducted by parties, organizations and popular movements.

The political scientist Emil Uddhammar criticized those opposing the Forum's initiatives for wanting to silence crimes against humanity committed in the name of Marxism.

== Per Anger Prize ==
Forum for Living History has the government's mandate to administer the Per Anger Prize. This has been awarded since 2004 to people and organizations who have excelled in helping others escape oppression and violence.
