= Per Anger =

Swedish diplomat (1913–2002)

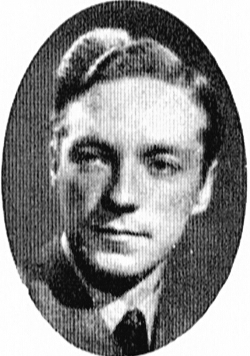
- Born: 7 December 1913; Gothenburg, Sweden
- Died: 25 August 2002 (aged 88); Stockholm, Sweden
- Burial place: Norra begravningsplatsen
- Education: Uppsala University
- Occupation: Diplomat
- Years active: 1940–1979
- Known for: Assisting Raoul Wallenberg in the rescue of Hungarian Jews from Nazis in World War II
- Spouse: Elena Wikström (m. 1943)
- Children: 3

Per Johan Valentin Anger (7 December 1913 – 25 August 2002) was a Swedish diplomat who played a significant role in humanitarian efforts during World War II and had a long career in international diplomacy. Born in Gothenburg, Sweden, he studied law at Uppsala University before beginning his diplomatic career at the Swedish legation in Berlin in 1940. While stationed in Budapest during the German occupation of Hungary, Anger helped organize the issuance of Swedish provisional passports and protective documents to Hungarian Jews, measures that contributed to the rescue efforts later expanded by Raoul Wallenberg.

Following the war, Anger held various diplomatic positions, including postings in Cairo, Addis Ababa, Vienna, Paris, San Francisco, Canberra, and Ottawa, as well as leadership roles within the Swedish Ministry for Foreign Affairs. Throughout his career, he was involved in international aid and humanitarian initiatives and dedicated substantial effort to uncovering the fate of Raoul Wallenberg, meeting with Soviet officials in pursuit of information.

Anger received multiple honors for his work, both in Sweden and internationally. He was recognized as Righteous Among the Nations by Yad Vashem, received the Wallenberg Medal from the University of Michigan, was granted honorary Israeli citizenship, and was awarded Sweden's Illis quorum. His career reflects both his diplomatic service and his commitment to humanitarian principles during and after the war.

== Early life ==
Anger was born on 7 December 1913 in Gothenburg, Sweden, the son of the Director of Public Works David Anger (1886–1963) and his wife Elsa Berglund (1885–1974), and nephew of the actuary Filip Anger. Anger completed his reserve officer examination in 1936 and received a Candidate of Law degree from Uppsala University in 1939.

== Career ==
After graduating from university in November 1939, Anger was drafted into the Army. Soon afterwards, the Ministry for Foreign Affairs offered him a trainee position at the Swedish legation in Berlin, which he began in January 1940. Anger was assigned to the trade department, but after the legation received information about an impending Nazi attack on Norway and Denmark, he became involved in relaying intelligence to Stockholm. In June 1941, he returned to Stockholm, where he worked on trade relations between Sweden and Hungary. In November 1942, he was sent to Budapest as second secretary at the Swedish legation.

After Germany invaded Hungary on 19 March 1944, Anger became involved in efforts to aid Hungarian Jews. Anger originated the idea of issuing Swedish provisional passports and special certificates to protect Jews from internment and deportation. Seven hundred of these documents were issued initially. Although the legality of the documents was doubtful, the Hungarian government agreed to recognize their bearers as Swedish citizens. On 9 July, Raoul Wallenberg arrived in Budapest. He immediately extended Anger's initiative, introducing colorful protective passes (Schutzpasse) and creating "safe houses" throughout the city. Anger and Wallenberg worked together, often literally snatching people from transports and death marches. After the Soviets invaded in January 1945, both Anger and Wallenberg were taken into custody. Anger was released three months later, but Wallenberg never emerged again, becoming one of the 20th century's most famous missing persons.

After the war, Anger served as acting second secretary at the Ministry for Foreign Affairs in 1945, second legation secretary in Cairo in 1946, and chargé d'affaires ad interim in Addis Ababa in 1946. He returned as second legation secretary in Cairo in 1948 and also served as second secretary at the Ministry for Foreign Affairs the same year, before becoming first secretary there in 1949. He was first legation secretary in Paris in 1953, in Vienna in 1955, and legation counsellor there in 1957. He then served as Head of Department at the Ministry for Foreign Affairs in 1957 and was appointed consul general in San Francisco in 1961.

In 1966, he was appointed Foreign Affairs Councillor and Head of the Department for International Aid Affairs at the Ministry for Foreign Affairs, a post he held until 1969. He served as ambassador to Canberra from 1970 to 1975, worked at the Ministry for Foreign Affairs from 1975 to 1976, and was ambassador to Ottawa from 1976 to 1979, with concurrent accreditation to Nassau, Bahamas, from 1978. He chaired the board of the Swedish Raoul Wallenberg Association from 1979 and served as its president from 1988 to 1995.

Throughout his post-war career, Anger led efforts to learn what happened to Wallenberg, even meeting personally with Soviet General Secretary Mikhail Gorbachev in the 1980s. In 2000, the Russian government finally acknowledged that Wallenberg and his driver died in Soviet custody in 1947, although the exact circumstances of their deaths remain unclear.

== Personal life ==
In 1943, Anger married the artist Elena Wikström (1920–2010), the daughter of ryttmästare Nils Wikström and Corinna (née Autenrieth). They had three children: Birgitta (born 1944), Jan (born 1946), and Peter (born 1955).

== Death ==
Anger died on 25 August 2002 in Katarina Parish in Stockholm after suffering a stroke. The funeral service took place on 27 September 2002 in Saint James's Church in Stockholm. He was interred on 7 October 2002 at Norra begravningsplatsen in Stockholm.

== Awards and honours ==
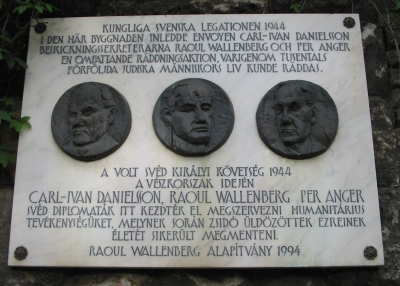
Plaque on the site of the former Swedish embassy in Budapest, in honour of Ivan Danielsson, Raoul Wallenberg and Per Anger.

=== Awards ===
==== Swedish ====
- (Sweden) Illis quorum, 8th size (2002)
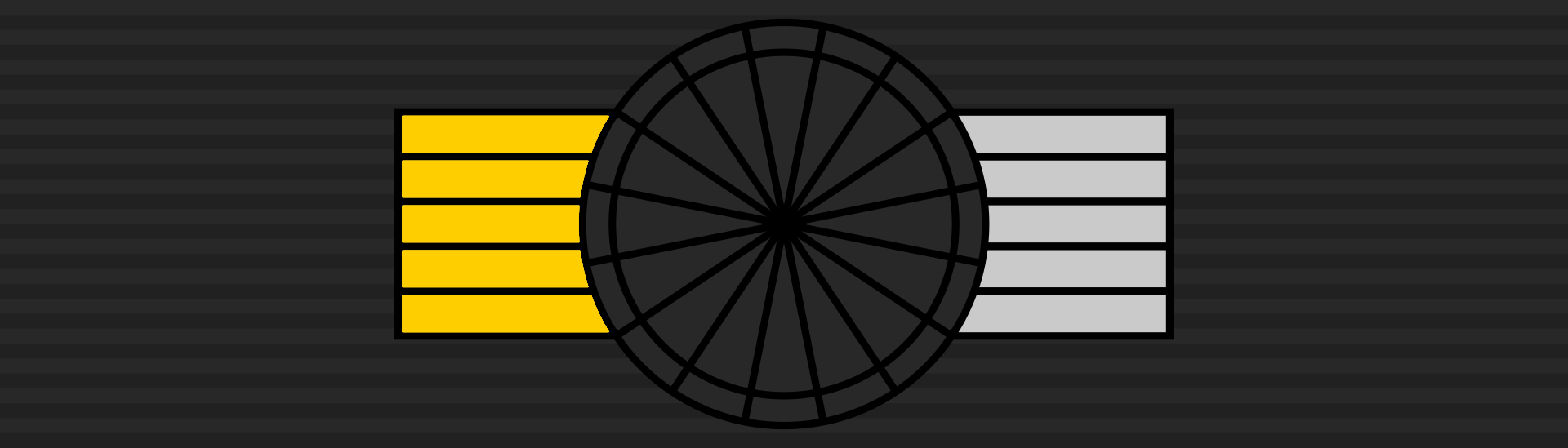
- (Sweden) Commander 1st Class of the Order of the Polar Star (11 November 1972)
- (Sweden) Commander of the Order of the Polar Star (6 June 1967)
- (Sweden) Knight of the Order of the Polar Star (1961)
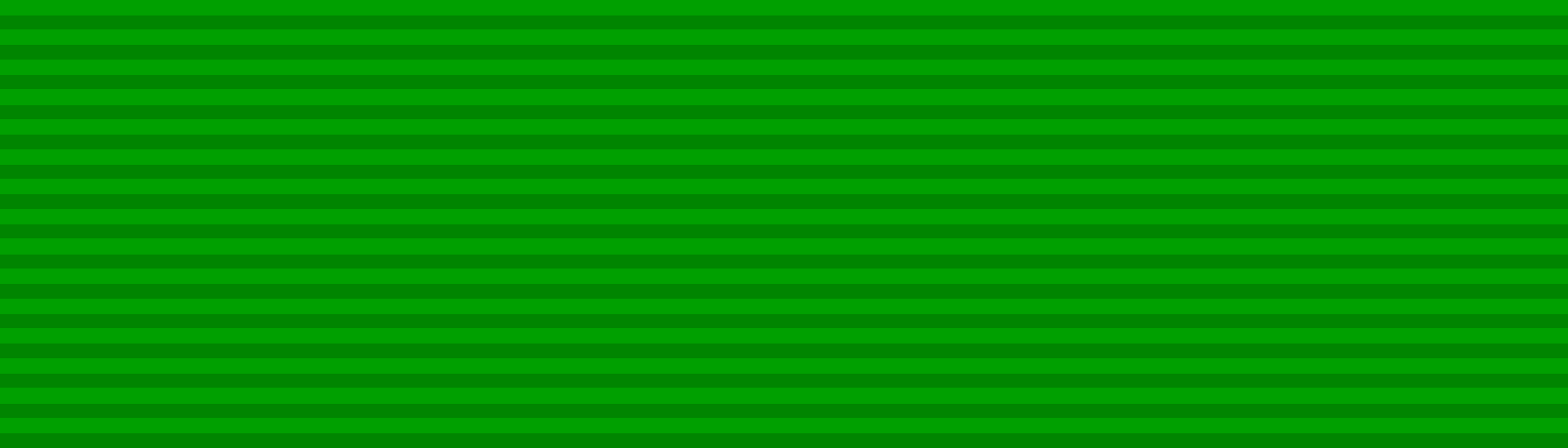
- (Sweden) Knight of the Order of Vasa (1945)

==== Foreign ====
- (Hungary) Commander of the Hungarian Order of Merit (1995)
- (Iran) Commander of the Order of the Crown
- Knight 1st Class of the Order of the White Rose of Finland
- (France) Officer of the Legion of Honour
- (Netherlands) Knight of the Order of Orange-Nassau
- (Egypt) 4th Class of the Order of the Nile
- Grand Decoration of Honour in Silver for Services to the Republic of Austria (1958)

=== Honors ===
He was a member of the Order of Coldin.

In 1982, Anger was recognized by Yad Vashem as one of the Righteous Among the Nations.

In 1995, Anger was awarded the Wallenberg Medal by the University of Michigan in recognition of his extraordinary courage and humanitarian commitment.

In 2000, he was awarded honorary Israeli citizenship.

In June 2001, the American Swedish Historical Museum presented him with the Spirit of Raoul Wallenberg Humanitarian Award.

In April 2002, Swedish Prime Minister Göran Persson awarded Anger the Illis quorum Meruere Labores (For Those Whose Labors Have Deserved It) for his actions during and after the war. This is the highest award that can be conferred upon an individual Swedish citizen by the Government of Sweden.

== Per Anger Prize ==
The Per Anger Prize was instituted by the Swedish Government to honor the memory of ambassador Per Anger and is awarded for humanitarian work and initiatives in the name of democracy. The prize is awarded to individuals or groups who have distinguished themselves either in the past or in more recent times. The prize is administered and awarded by the Living History Forum.

=== Prize winners ===
Name	Year Awarded	Reason
Gennaro Verolino	2004	Saved over 30,000 Jews from the Holocaust
Arsen Sakalov	2005	The teacher who became a human rights activist in the Russian autonomous republic Ingushia
Ales Bialiatski	2006	The human rights fighter acting against the Belarusian regime
Yolanda Becerra	2007	Chairperson for the women's rights organisation Organización Femenina Popular
Sebastian Bakare	2008	Fighting the rights of the vulnerable in Zimbabwe
Brahim Dahane	2009	Founder of the human rights organisation ASVDH working in Western Sahara
Elena Urlaeva	2010	Fighting for the freedom of expression and the freedom of assembly in Uzbekistan
Narges Mohammadi	2011	Working for human rights in Iran
Sapiyat Magomedova	2012	Defending human rights in Dagestan
Justine Ijeomah	2013	Fighting against violation of human rights in Nigeria
Rita Mahato	2014	Fighting against sexual violence aimed towards women and girls in Nepal
Islena Rey Rodríguez	2015	Fighting against violence and human rights violations in Colombia
Abdullah al-Khateeb	2016	Fighting for human rights in Syria
Gégé Katana Bukuru	2017	Fighting for women's rights in the Democratic Republic of Congo
Teodora del Carmen Vásquez	2018	Fighting for women's rights in El Salvador
Najwa Alimi	2019	Fighting for freedom of speech and women's rights in Afghanistan
Intisar Al-Amyal	2020	Fighting for women's rights in Iraq
S'bu Zikode	2021	Working for the rights of poor people in South Africa
Anabela Lemos	2022	Fighting for climate justice in Mozambique
Malú García Andrade	2023	Demanding justice for disappeared and murdered girls and women in Mexico
Chhim Sithar	2024	Tireless and dedicated work to promote democracy and respect for human rights in Cambodia
Ana Ruth García	2025	Advocate for women and girls in Honduras
Brito Fernando	2026	Seeking truth and justice for people who have disappeared involuntarily in Sri Lanka

== Bibliography ==
- Anger, Per; Lantos, Tom (2005). S Raulem Vallenbergom v Budapešte: vospominanija o voennych godach v Vengrii [With Raoul Wallenberg in Budapest: memories of the war years in Hungary] (in Russian). Translated by Bekker, M. I. Saint Petersburg: Akademičeskij proekt. ISBN 5733103167. SELIBR 10211018.
- Anger, Per (1995) [1981]. With Raoul Wallenberg in Budapest: memories of the war years in Hungary (Repr. ed.). Washington, D.C.: Holocaust Library. ISBN 0896041565. SELIBR 6288570.
- Anger, Per (1985). Med Raoul Wallenberg i Budapest: minnen från krigsåren i Ungern [With Raoul Wallenberg in Budapest: memories of the war years in Hungary]. Norstedts faktapocket, 99-0515866-9 (in Swedish) (New ed.). Stockholm: Norstedt. ISBN 9118533310. SELIBR 7154225.
- Anger, Per (1981). With Raoul Wallenberg in Budapest: memories of the war years in Hungary. New York: Holocaust. ISBN 089604047X. SELIBR 6288544.
- Anger, Per (1979). Med Raoul Wallenberg i Budapest: minnen från krigsåren i Ungern [With Raoul Wallenberg in Budapest: memories of the war years in Hungary] (in Swedish). Stockholm: Norstedt. ISBN 9117934621. SELIBR 7153024.

== See also ==
- Raoul Wallenberg

Diplomatic posts
Preceded by Manne Lindholm	Consul-general of Sweden to San Francisco; 1961–1966	Succeeded by Carl Henrik Petersén
Preceded by Gösta af Petersens	Ambassador of Sweden to Australia; 1970–1975	Succeeded by Per Lind
Preceded by Åke Malmaeus	Ambassador of Sweden to Canada; 1976–1979	Succeeded by Kaj Björk
Preceded by None	Ambassador of Sweden to The Bahamas; 1978–1979	Succeeded by Kaj Björk
