= Teodora del Carmen Vásquez =

Salvadoran civil rights activist

Teodora del Carmen Vásquez (born 1986) is a Salvadoran civil rights activist who campaigns against gender-based violence against women. At the age of 24 and nine months pregnant, she suffered a miscarriage at work, which led to her arrest and conviction. She is co-founder of the association Mujeres Libres de El Salvador (Spanish for Free Women of El Salvador).

== Early life ==
Del Carmen was born into a rural farming family in the department of Ahuachapán in El Salvador, near the border with Guatemala. Life in this remote region was marked by poverty and a lack of access to basic services. By the age of 24, she had only been able to attend school for four years.

== Imprisonment ==
Before her imprisonment in 2007, del Carmen worked in a school cafeteria in the capital city of San Salvador to provide financial support for her son Ángel Gabriel and her parents. In 2007, Vásquez was in her ninth month of pregnancy. When she went into labor at her workplace three weeks before her due date, she called several times for an ambulance and the police. Nevertheless, she was forced to give birth alone. The child was stillborn, Vásquez lost a lot of blood and fainted. She was arrested and tortured on the same day. She was denied adequate medical care.

No investigation was ever conducted, nor was any evidence ever presented. Her phone, which could have served as evidence of her calls for help, was taken from her. She was sentenced to 30 years in prison for aggravated murder. After eight days, she was transferred from pre-trial detention to prison. She spent three months alone in dark confinement. She was then placed in a cell with 300 other women. While in prison, she was subjected to violence and harassment by other inmates.

During her time in prison, Vasquez recognized the need for a support network. Having only attended school for four years in her life up to that point, she obtained a school qualification while in prison, began reading legal literature, and asked her fellow inmates about their needs. Vasquez began to explore the issues of experiences of violence, life in a patriarchal system, and social discrimination. In 2007, there was no organization dedicated to these issues.

After ten years and seven months, she was released in 2018, thanks to massive international protests by various organizations campaigning for her release. Vásquez was taken in by her family. She had seen her son, who was four years old at the time of her imprisonment, four times during her time in prison. She reports that he was her motivation to persevere. As a result of threats and persecution by pro-life organizations, she received offers of asylum to leave the country, but she wants to fight injustice together with other women. After her release, she began studying.

== International support and release ==
Del Carmen gained international attention after she was sentenced to 30 years in prison for the stillbirth of her child, a sentence that was heavily criticized and cited as an example of El Salvador's extreme abortion laws. During her imprisonment in Ilopango Women's Prison, del Carmen used her personal fate as a starting point for her activism and became a voice for women's rights.

After her release in 2018, which was forced by international protests and lack of evidence, she continued her fight. In 2018, the year of her release Vásquez sought out fellow activists across the country. Together with 16 other women who had been imprisoned for obstetric emergencies, she founded a women's collective that became the legally constituted organization Mujeres Libres de El Salvador in 2022. Vásquez considers the approval of this organization alone to be progress in social development.

== Awards and legacy ==
In 2018, Vásquez was nominated and awarded the Per Anger Prize for Human Rights by the Swedish section of Amnesty International. The citation read: "Teodora del Carmen Vásquez is being honored for her fight for women's sexual and reproductive health rights in El Salvador [...]. She has transformed personal pain into a force that gives support and hope to many girls and women in her home country. Continuing the fight after ten years in prison is not only extraordinary, it also requires great courage."

The 2021 documentary film Fly so far, tells the story of Teodora del Carmen Vásquez and 16 other women who were imprisoned for obstetric emergencies. In it, they describe their cases and talk about sexual and reproductive rights. The film was initially censored by the government, but was eventually allowed to be shown to people aged 18 and over. By 2022, the film had been shown at almost 60 festivals.

== See also ==
- Gender inequality in El Salvador
