= Swedish Canadians =

Canadians of Swedish ancestry

Svenskkanadensare (Swedish) Suédo-canadiens (French)

Total population
- 349,640 (by ancestry, 2016 Census); 1.0% of Canada's population

Regions with significant populations
- Western Canada; Ontario; Quebec

Languages
- Canadian English; Swedish; Canadian French

Related ethnic groups
- Swedes; Swedish Americans; Swedish Britons; Swedish Australians

Swedish Canadians (Swedish: Svenskkanadensare) are Canadian citizens of Swedish ancestry or Swedes who emigrated to and reside in Canada. The Swedish Canadian community in Canada numbered 349,640 in the 2016 population census. The vast majority of them reside west of Lake Superior, primarily in Winnipeg, Calgary, Edmonton and Vancouver. Toronto is the most popular settlement spot for newcomers. Despite having an influential presence and distinctive cultural bond, only 14,000 Canadian persons of Swedish descent speak Swedish.

== History ==
Swedish Canadian Population History
Year	Pop.	±%
1921	61,503	—
1931	81,306	+32.2%
1941	85,396	+5.0%
1951	97,780	+14.5%
1961	121,757	+24.5%
1971	101,870	−16.3%
1981	78,360	−23.1%
1986	203,875	+160.2%
1991	236,660	+16.1%
1996	278,975	+17.9%
2001	282,760	+1.4%
2006	334,765	+18.4%
2011	341,845	+2.1%
2016	349,640	+2.3%
Source: Statistics Canada Note: 1981 Canadian census did not include multiple ethnic origin responses, thus population is an undercount.

A few Swedes immigrated into Canada before it became a country in 1867, but the first real wave of immigration began in the late 1890s and ended with the onset of the First World War in 1914. Included in this group were a significant number of farmers who had settled first in the United States.

The first Swede, Jacob Fahlström, arrived in Canada in 1809, as an employee of the Hudson's Bay Company. He was succeeded in 1812 by another Swedish man, who was accompanied by two other men from Norway and Ireland to populate the Red River Colony in lower Manitoba. A much more substantive wave of Swedish settlers immigrated to Canada from the United States between 1868 and 1914, as land for farming became more and more scarce in America. Crop failures in their home country between 1866 and 1868 encouraged a similar exodus from Sweden.

The second and largest wave, which came during the 1920s, endured both the depression of the 1930s and the Second World War 1939–45. The third wave, although not as numerous, has been steady since the 1950s.

The immigrant pattern in Canada differs slightly from their counterpart in the United States. Whereas the majority of the earlier Swedish immigrants in America are from south-central Sweden, a significant portion of the Swedish immigrants in Canada are from the Stockholm region and Northern Sweden.

As the economic situation improved after the Second World War, the overall emigration rate of Sweden slowed considerably. Very much like recent Swedish emigrants found in other parts of the world, many of the newcomers are connected with Swedish companies, and do not intend to remain in the country permanently.

== Spatial distribution ==
Most Swedes settled in western Canada, from Northern Ontario to British Columbia. There were only a handful of strictly Swedish communities, the earliest being Scandinavia, Manitoba, in 1885 and Stockholm, Saskatchewan, in 1886. The Census of Canada shows that Swedish immigrants could be found scattered throughout every province and territory, with pockets in rural areas and in some towns and cities.

Winnipeg acted as the Swedish capital of Canada until the 1940s when Vancouver took over this title. A significant number of Swedes live in Calgary and Edmonton and their environs, but the Toronto area is home to the largest concentration of newcomers, where it has one of the largest concentration of Swedish business in North America.

More than 175 places' names in Canada are of Swedish origin, which include Uppsala (Ontario), Stockholm (Saskatchewan) and Thorsby (Alberta).

=== Swedish Canadians by province or territory ===
Swedish Canadian population by province and territory in Canada in 2011:

Province or territory	Swedish Canadians	Percentage
Canada	341,845	1.1%
British Columbia	106,085	2.45%
Alberta	96,890	2.72%
Ontario	67,795	0.54%
Saskatchewan	32,705	3.24%
Manitoba	22,575	1.92%
Quebec	6,265	0.08%
Nova Scotia	3,815	0.42%
New Brunswick	2,640	0.36%
Newfoundland and Labrador	955	0.18%
Yukon	945	2.84%
Prince Edward Island	600	0.44%
Northwest Territories	510	1.25%
Nunavut	65	0.21%

== Assimilation ==
Assimilation was considered by most Swedes as a primary goal to succeed. Early immigrants made every effort to master the English language while supporting a fairly large number of Swedish-language newspapers, including two weeklies. The only Swedish magazine in North America today, the Swedish Press, is published in Vancouver.

Swedes are accustomed to four distinct seasons. Although Sweden is located quite far north (in the Western Hemisphere it would lie in the middle of Hudson Bay), the Gulf Stream keeps Sweden significantly more temperate than would be expected. The reason that so many Swedes settled on the prairies, despite the very different landscape and significantly colder winters, was the availability of land.

== Notable Swedish Canadians ==
Noteworthy Canadians of Swedish origin include former NHL Hockey star Daniel Alfredsson, who is originally from Sweden but has lived in Canada since playing 19 years for the Ottawa Senators, and he eventually acquired Canadian citizenship in September 2016; Canadian Senator Pamela Wallin; Judge Tom Berger, who headed the Mackenzie Valley Pipeline inquiry; architect Arthur Erickson, who designed Roy Thomson Hall in Toronto and the Canadian Embassy in Washington, D.C.; singer-songwriter and recording artist Michael Saxell; Harry Strom, who was the premier of Alberta (1968–1971); naturalist Louise de Kiriline Lawrence, who was the most prolific contributor to the Audubon; and Ralph Gustafson, who won the Governor General's Award for poetry in 1974.

- Karl Agell – Canadian heavy metal singer (born 1966)
- Teal Bunbury – American soccer player (born 1990)
- Malin Åkerman – Swedish and American actress (born 1978)
- Daniel Alfredsson – Swedish ice hockey player (born 1972)
- David L. Anderson – Canadian politician (born 1957)
- Glenn Anderson – Canadian ice hockey player (born 1960)
- Margaret Avison – Canadian poet (1918–2007)
- Hayden Christensen – Canadian actor (born 1981)
- John Cordts – Canadian racing driver (1935–2026)
- Aaron Ekblad – Canadian ice hockey player (born 1996)
- Jennifer Granholm – American politician (born 1959)
- Dean Haglund – Canadian actor (born 1965)
- Tricia Helfer – Canadian and American actress and former model (born 1974)
- Magnus Isacsson – Canadian documentary filmmaker (1948–2012)
- Oskar Johansson – Canadian sailor (born 1977)
- Eric Lindros – Canadian ice hockey player (born 1973)
- Robert Nilsson – Swedish ice hockey player (born 1985)
- Lorne Nystrom – Canadian politician (born 1946)
- Peter Outerbridge – Canadian actor (born 1966)
- Ulla Ryghe – Swedish film editor (1924–2011)
- Red Berenson – Canadian ice hockey player, coach (born 1939)
- Michael Saxell – Musical artist (born 1956)
- Bria Skonberg – Canadian jazz musician
- Alexander Steen – Swedish ice hockey player (born 1984)
- Alexander Sundström – Swedish-Canadian ice hockey player, coach (born 1987)
- Birgitta Wallace – Swedish–Canadian archaeologist (1934–2025)
- Alexander Sundström – Swedish-Canadian ice hockey player, coach (born 1987)
- William Nylander – Swedish ice hockey player (born 1996)
- Alexander Nylander – Swedish ice hockey player (born 1998)
- Eric Johansson (ice hockey) – Swedish-Canadian ice hockey player (born 1982)
- Harry Strom – Premier of Alberta from 1968 to 1971
- George Sahlmark – Canadian politician
- Martin Pederson – Saskatchewan politician and leader of the PC Party
- Ralph Gustafson – Canadian poet and professor (1909–1995)
- Harold R. Johnson – Canadian lawyer and writer (1954–2022)
- John W. Semple – Canadian immunologist

== See also ==
- Canada–Sweden relations
- Wawa Runestone
- Swedish diaspora
- Immigration to Canada
- Danish Canadians
- Estonian Canadians
- Finnish Canadians
- Icelandic Canadians
- Norwegian Canadians
- Swedish Americans
