= Anabela Lemos =

Mozambican human rights activist (born 1953)

- Born: 18 February 1953 (age 73); Maputo, Portuguese Mozambique
- Citizenship: Mozambique
- Occupation: Environmental activist
- Years active: 1998–present
- Organization: Justiça Ambiental!
- Awards: Right Livelihood Award (2024)

Anabela Lemos (born 18 February 1953) is a Mozambican human rights activist. She is the co-founder of Justiça Ambiental!, an environmental rights organisation, and in 2024 received the Right Livelihood Award for her opposition to international megaprojects in Mozambique.

== Biography ==
Lemos was born in Maputo, Mozambique.

In 1998, Lemos led a grassroots campaign against a Danish-backed waste incineration plant near her home in Matola using pesticides. Gathering the support of national and international organisations such as Greenpeace, the project was successfully halted in 2000.

Lemos has advocated for the importance of holding transnational corporations in their home countries. She identified that Mozambique's development model of opening up the country to foreign investment had led to land grabs, human rights violations and conflicts, and felt that people in rural areas did not have a voice about what happened to their land or an awareness of their rights.

In 1998, Lemos co-founded the environmental organisation Livango.

Lemos is the co-founder director of Justiça Ambiental! (JA!; lit. 'Climate Justice!'), a non-governmental organisation advocating for environmental justice in Mozambique, which was founded in 2004 after Lemos left Livango to focus on placing human rights and climate justice within environmental activism.

Through JA!, Lemos was a leader of the Say No to Gas campaign that brought attention to environmental and human rights violations caused by liquid natural gas extraction projects in northern Mozambique. JA! also campaigned against Mozambique LNG, a 24 billion USD gas extraction project in Cabo Delgado Province backed by TotalEnergies by building alliances with organisations in 23 countries known to be funding the project to challenge the project. JA! provided evidence of human rights violations and corporate crimes, successfully delaying the project. In 2021, JA! supported a legal case led by Friends of the Earth England, Wales and Northern Ireland to oppose the United Kingdom's export credit agency's funding of Mozambique LNG by providing evidence of the impact of gas extraction on local people.

Lemos is the coordinator of JA!'s campaign to delay the construction of the Mphanda Nkuwa Dam in Tete Province, having been campaign against it since 2000.

As a result of her activism, Lemos' offices have been broken into, her car brakes have been sabotaged, and one of her sons was assaulted. Lemos and JA! have been labelled as anti-development and anti-patriotic by some pro-government forces. Lemos has been critical of Mozambican authorities, accusing them of "repressive violence" while maintaining impunity and supported protests following the election.

== Recognition ==
In 2022, Lemos was awarded the Per Anger Prize for her campaign for farmers forced to leave their homes to make space for gas and coal extraction despite threats made against her; she was nominated by WeEffect.

In 2024, Lemos was announced as one of the laureates for the Right Livelihood Award "for empowering communities to stand up for their right to say no to exploitative mega-projects and demand environmental justice". Lemos and JA! were the first Mozambican laureates of the award.
