= List of twin towns and sister cities in Canada =

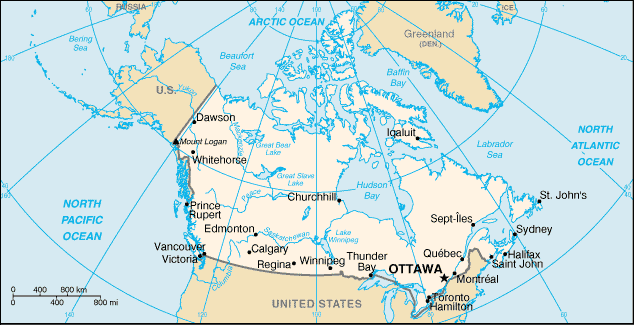
Map of Canada

This is a list of municipalities in Canada which have standing links to local communities in other countries known as "town twinning" (usually in Europe) or "sister cities" (usually in the rest of the world).

== A ==
Abbotsford

- Fukagawa, Japan

Airdrie

- Gwacheon, South Korea
- North Lanarkshire, Scotland, United Kingdom

Alma

- Falaise, France
- Saltillo, Mexico

Armstrong

- Rathfriland, Northern Ireland, United Kingdom

Ashcroft

- Bifuka, Japan

Aurora

- Leksand, Sweden

== B ==
Barrhead

- Chapala, Mexico
- Drouin (Baw Baw), Australia
- Kitami, Japan

Barrie

- Harrogate, England, United Kingdom
- Saginaw, United States
- Zweibrücken, Germany

Beaconsfield

- Verneuil-sur-Seine, France

Belleville

- Gunpo, South Korea
- Lahr, Germany
- Zhucheng, China

Blainville

- Chambéry, France

Bouctouche

- St. Martinville, United States

Bracebridge

- Gol, Norway

Brampton terminated all its twinnings.

Brandon

- Sheptytskyi, Ukraine

Brantford

- Kamianets-Podilskyi, Ukraine
- Ostrów Wielkopolski, Poland

Brockville

- Ontario, United States

Bromont

- Cabourg, France

Burlington

- Apeldoorn, Netherlands
- Itabashi (Tokyo), Japan

Burnaby

- Hwaseong, South Korea
- Kushiro, Japan
- Mesa, United States
- Zhongshan, China

== C ==
Calgary

- Daejeon, South Korea
- Daqing, China
- Jaipur, India
- Naucalpan de Juárez, Mexico
- Phoenix, United States
- Quebec City, Canada

Campbell River

- Ishikari, Japan

Camrose

- Kamifurano, Japan
- Kentville, Canada
- Saguenay, Canada
- Warwick (Southern Downs), Australia
- Yichun, China

Canmore

- Higashikawa, Japan
- Sedona, United States

Cantley

- Ornans, France

Cape Breton

- Dalian, China
- Givenchy-en-Gohelle, France
- Wałbrzych, Poland

Cap-Pelé

- Broussard, United States

Carleton Place

- Comrie, Scotland, United Kingdom
- Franklin, United States

Castlegar

- Enbetsu, Japan
- Stephenville, Canada
- Yueyang, China

Cavan Monaghan

- (Republic of Ireland) Monaghan, Ireland

Charlottetown

- Ashibetsu, Japan

Châteauguay

- Cambrai, France
- Châteaugay, France
- Moose Jaw, Canada

Chatham-Kent

- Bielawa, Poland
- Gangbuk (Seoul), South Korea
- Harpers Ferry, United States

Coaticook

- Beaupréau-en-Mauges, France

Cobourg

- Coburg, Germany

Cold Lake

- Hügelsheim, Germany

Collingwood

- Boone, United States
- Katano, Japan
- Zihuatanejo, Mexico

Coquitlam

- Paju, South Korea

Cornwall

- Coventry, England, United Kingdom

Côte Saint-Luc

- Ashkelon, Israel

Cranbrook

- Coeur d'Alene, United States

== D ==
Didsbury

- Miki, Japan

Dieppe

- Carencro, United States
- Dieppe, France

Drummondville

- Braine-l'Alleud, Belgium
- Kochersberg (communauté), France
- La Roche-sur-Yon, France

== E ==
Edmonton

- Gatineau, Canada
- Harbin, China
- Nashville, United States
- Wonju, South Korea

== G ==
Gimli

- Akureyri, Iceland

Goderich

- Bay City, United States

Granby

- Carrefour, Haiti
- Coventry, England, United Kingdom
- Hammam-Lif, Tunisia
- Windsor, Canada

Grand Forks

- Spremberg, Germany

Grande Prairie

- Mazatlán, Mexico

Greater Sudbury

- Kokkola, Finland

Guelph

- Castelfranco Veneto, Italy
- Loria, Italy
- Treviso, Italy

== H ==
Halifax

- Campeche, Mexico
- Hakodate, Japan
- Norfolk, United States
- Portsmouth, England, United Kingdom
- Zhuhai, China

Halton Hills

- Wenjiang (Chengdu), China

Hamilton

- Flint, United States
- Fukuyama, Japan
- Kaga, Japan
- Ma'anshan, China
- Mangalore, India
- Monterrey, Mexico
- Racalmuto, Italy
- Shawinigan, Canada
- Sulmona, Italy

Hampstead

- Kiryat Shmona, Israel

Hanna

- Wake, Japan

Hinton

- Wanouchi, Japan

Hope

- Izu, Japan

== I ==
Iqaluit

- Qeqqata, Greenland

== J ==
Jasper

- Hakone, Japan

Joliette

- Brive-la-Gaillarde, France

== K ==
Kamloops

- Uji, Japan

Kawartha Lakes

- Nayoro, Japan

Kelowna

- Kasugai, Japan

Kenora

- Shimokawa, Japan

Kentville

- Camrose, Canada
- Castel di Sangro, Italy

Kimberley

- Annaka, Japan

Kingston

- Cienfuegos, Cuba
- Scottsdale, United States

Kingsville

- Westlake, United States

== L ==
Lacombe

- Rikubetsu, Japan

Lac-Mégantic

- Dourdan, France
- Farmington, United States

Lake Cowichan

- Date, Japan

Laval

- Botoșani, Romania
- Klagenfurt, Austria
- Laval, France
- Manila, Philippines
- Nice, France
- Pedro Aguirre Cerda, Chile
- Ribeira Grande, Portugal
- San Salvador, El Salvador

Leduc

- Beihai, China
- Grimma, Germany

Lethbridge

- Anyang, China
- Culver City, United States
- Great Falls, United States
- Saint-Laurent (Montreal), Canada
- Timashyovsk, Russia
- Towada, Japan

Lévis

- Le Grand-Quevilly, France

Lloydminster

- Nikopol, Ukraine

London

- Nanjing, China

Longueuil

- Lafayette, United States
- Whitby, Canada

Lorraine

- Saint-Dié-des-Vosges, France

== M ==
Markham

- Cary, United States
- Nördlingen, Germany
- Wuhan, China

Mirabel

- Châlons-en-Champagne, France

Miramichi

- (Republic of Ireland) Monaghan, Ireland

Mission

- Oyama, Japan

Mississauga

- Kariya, Japan

Moncton

- Lafayette, United States
- North Bay, Canada

Montreal

- Algiers, Algeria
- Antananarivo, Madagascar
- Athens, Greece
- Busan, South Korea
- Hiroshima, Japan
- Lucknow, India
- Lyon, France
- Montréal-la-Cluse, France
- Rio de Janeiro, Brazil
- Shanghai, China
- Tunis, Tunisia
- Yerevan, Armenia

== N ==
Nanaimo

- Haikou, China

Nanton

- Senantes, France

Nelson

- Baie-Saint-Paul, Canada
- Izu, Japan
- Kaoma District, Zambia

Neuville

- Neuville-de-Poitou, France

New Westminster

- Lijiang, China
- Moriguchi, Japan
- Quezon City, Philippines

North Bay

- Moncton, Canada

North Grenville

- Sokal, Ukraine

North Vancouver

- Chiba, Japan
- Huizhou, China

== O ==
Oakville

- Dorval, Canada
- Huai'an, China
- Neyagawa, Japan

Oliver

- Bandai, Japan

Ottawa

- Beijing, China
- Catania, Italy

Owen Sound

- Dayi County, China
- Miamisburg, United States
- Ocho Rios, Jamaica

== P ==
Penticton

- Ikeda, Japan

Perth

- Asago, Japan
- Perth, Scotland, United Kingdom

Peterborough

- Ann Arbor, United States
- (Republic of Ireland) Monaghan, Ireland

Port Alberni

- Abashiri, Japan

Port Hardy

- Numata, Japan

Prince Albert

- Jilin City, China

Prince George

- Maardu, Estonia

Prince Rupert

- Cangzhou, China
- Ketchikan, United States
- Owase, Japan

Princeville

- Saint-M'Hervé, France

== Q ==
Quebec City

- Bordeaux, France
- Calgary, Canada
- Namur, Belgium
- Xi'an, China

Quesnel

- Shiraoi, Japan

== R ==
Regina

- Jinan, China

Renews-Cappahayden

- (Republic of Ireland) Athenry, Ireland

Repentigny

- Bergerac, France

Richmond

- Pierrefonds-Roxboro (Montreal), Canada
- Wakayama, Japan
- Xiamen, China

Richmond Hill

- Lakeland, United States
- Netanya, Israel
- Shijiazhuang, China

== S ==
Saguenay

- Angoulême, France
- Camrose, Canada

Saint John

- Bangor, United States
- Donghae, South Korea
- Newport, United States
- Shantou, China

Saint-Lambert

- La Flèche, France
- Vernon, Canada

Saint-Sulpice

- Saint-Jean-d'Angély, France

Saint-Valentin

- Rikubetsu, Japan

Sainte-Adèle

- Mingguang, China

Sainte-Agathe-des-Monts

- Lagny-sur-Marne, France
- Saranac Lake, United States

Sainte-Brigitte-de-Laval

- Yerres, France

Sainte-Thérèse

- Annecy, France
- Lagoa, Portugal

Salaberry-de-Valleyfield

- Combs-la-Ville, France
- Penglai (Yantai), China
- Safi, Morocco

Salmon Arm

- Inashiki, Japan

Saskatoon

- Chernivtsi, Ukraine
- Shijiazhuang, China
- Umeå, Sweden

Sault Ste. Marie

- Forssa, Finland
- Maia, Portugal
- Sault Ste. Marie, United States

Shawinigan

- Chambéry, France
- Hamilton, Canada

Sherbrooke

- Montpellier, France

Shippagan

- Loudun, France

Sidney

- Anacortes, United States
- Cairns, Australia
- Niimi, Japan

Sioux Lookout

- Vashkivtsi, Ukraine

Sooke

- Port Townsend, United States

Sparwood

- Kamisunagawa, Japan

Squamish

- Shimizu, Japan

Stienbach

- Zaporizhzhia, Ukraine

Stettler

- Okoppe, Japan

Stony Plain

- Shikaoi, Japan

St. Catharines

- Port of Spain, Trinidad and Tobago

St. John's

- (Republic of Ireland) Waterford, Ireland

St. Thomas

- Bowling Green, United States
- Xuyi, China

Summerland

- Toyokoro, Japan

Summerside

- Stirling, Scotland, United Kingdom

Surrey

- Kōtō (Tokyo), Japan
- Zhuhai, China

== T ==
Taber

- Bondo, Kenya
- Higashiōmi, Japan

Tecumseh

- Frosinone, Italy
- (Republic of Ireland) Oldcastle, Ireland
- Tecumseh, United States

Terrebonne

- Vitré, France

Thunder Bay

- Duluth, United States
- Gifu, Japan
- Jiaozuo, China
- Little Canada, United States
- Seinäjoki, Finland

Tillsonburg

- Hengshui, China

Timmins

- Naoshima, Japan

Toronto

- Chicago, United States
- Chongqing, China
- Frankfurt am Main, Germany
- Milan, Italy

Trois-Rivières

- Tours, France

== V ==
Vancouver

- Edinburgh, Scotland, United Kingdom
- Guangzhou, China
- Los Angeles, United States
- Odesa, Ukraine
- Yokohama, Japan

Varennes

- El Jadida, Morocco

Vaughan

- Baguio, Philippines
- Delia, Italy
- Lanciano, Italy
- Ramla, Israel
- Sanjō, Japan
- Sora, Italy
- Yangzhou, China

Vegreville

- Kolomyia Raion, Ukraine
- Stryi, Ukraine

Vernon

- Anandpur Sahib, India
- Frankenburg am Hausruck, Austria
- Modesto, United States
- Saint-Lambert, Canada
- Tavullia, Italy
- Tome, Japan

Victoria

- Morioka, Japan
- Napier, New Zealand
- Suzhou, China

Victoriaville

- Colomiers, France

== W ==
Wetaskiwin

- Ashoro, Japan

Whistler

- Karuizawa, Japan

Whitby

- Longueuil, Canada
- Whitby, England, United Kingdom

White Rock

- Imperial Beach, United States

Whitecourt

- Yūbetsu, Japan

Whitehorse

- Chortkiv, Ukraine
- Juneau, United States
- Lancieux, France
- Ushiku, Japan

Windsor

- Changchun, China
- Coventry, England, United Kingdom
- Fujisawa, Japan
- Granby, Canada
- Gunsan, South Korea
- Lublin, Poland
- Mannheim, Germany
- Las Vueltas, El Salvador
- Ohrid, North Macedonia
- Saint-Étienne, France
- Saltillo, Mexico
- Udine, Italy

Winnipeg

- Beersheba, Israel
- Chengdu, China
- Jinju, South Korea
- Kuopio, Finland
- Lviv, Ukraine
- Manila, Philippines
- Minneapolis, United States
- Reykjavík, Iceland
- San Nicolás de los Garza, Mexico
- Setagaya (Tokyo), Japan
- Taichung, Taiwan

Woodstock

- Pesche, Italy
- Sylvania, United States

== Y ==
Yellowknife terminated all its twinnings.
