= Pieter Bevelander =

Swedish professor

Pieter Cornelis Johannes Bevelander (born 13 October 1963), is Director of the Malmö Institute for Studies of Migration, Diversity, and Welfare (MIM) and Professor in international migration and ethnic relations at the Department of Global Political Studies at Malmö University in Sweden.

His research interest includes naturalization and labour market integration in the Netherlands, economic integration of refugees arriving via family reunification in Canada and Sweden, and attitudes toward these groups. He has provided reviews for several international journals. He obtained a PhD in economic history from the University of Lund 2000, writing on the integration of Swedish immigrants between 1970 and 1995.

== See also ==
- Somalis in Sweden
- Immigration to Sweden
