= Embassy of Sweden, Ottawa =

Diplomatic mission of Sweden in Canada

- Location: Ottawa
- Address: 377 Dalhousie Street, Suite 305; Ottawa ON K1N 9N8; Canada
- Coordinates: 45.42754°N 75.68981°W
- Opening: 1943
- Ambassador: Signe Burgstaller
- Jurisdiction: Canada
- Website: Official website

The Embassy of Sweden in Ottawa is Sweden's diplomatic mission in Canada. The Swedish embassy in Canada represents the Swedish government in Canada and The Bahamas. The embassy is located in ByWard Market in the downtown core of the capital of Ottawa. Ambassador since 2023 is Signe Burgstaller. Sweden also has nine honorary consulates in Canada.

== History ==
In August 1943, the Swedish government decided to establish a diplomatic mission in Ottawa and close the Consulate General of Sweden, Montreal. Consul General in Montreal Per Wijkman was appointed as the envoy to Ottawa. In March 1956, an agreement was reached between the Swedish and Canadian governments on the mutual elevation of the two countries' legations to embassies. In connection with this, on 16 March, the Swedish government appointed the newly appointed envoy there, Oscar Thorsing, as Sweden's ambassador in Ottawa.

== Staff and tasks ==
The embassy serves as the official communication channel between the Swedish and Canadian governments, led by the Ambassador who represents Sweden in Canada. It monitors and reports on political, economic, and financial developments in Canada that impact bilateral relations. The embassy also acts as a Swedish public authority, handling consular and migration matters such as issuing passports, certificates, visas, and providing assistance to Swedes in emergencies. Additionally, the embassy promotes Swedish culture, trade, and research in Canada, working closely with Business Sweden to enhance trade relations and support Swedish companies in navigating trade barriers and complex contracts in Canada. Sweden's presence is further supported by Honorary Consuls in several Canadian cities.

== Buildings ==
=== Chancery ===
From 1943 to 1944, the chancery was located at the Chateau Laurier Hotel at 1 Rideau Street in Downtown Ottawa. In 1945, the chancery was located to a building next to the ambassadorial residence, at 720 Manor Avenue (Note: The Swedish ambassadorial residence is located on 700 Manor Avenue and the property on 700 Manor Avenue was later used to house embassy staff.) in Rockcliffe Park. 819 Coltrin Road was the location of the residence. In 1949, a legation office was opened at 1462 Bishop Street in Montreal. From 1950 to 1953, the legation office was located at Bishop Court Apartments on 1511 Bishop Street.

In 1950, the chancery was still located at 720 Manor Avenue but the residence was located at 219 Coltrin Road in Rockcliffe Park. The years 1958–1964, the chancery was located in Suite 704 in the Victoria Building at 140 Wellington Street, opposite the West Block building. In 1965 it moved to Suite 604 at the same address where it remained until 1979. The years 1980–1989, the embassy was located at 441 MacLaren Street in Centretown. Since 1990, the embassy is located at 377 Dalhousie Street in ByWard Market.

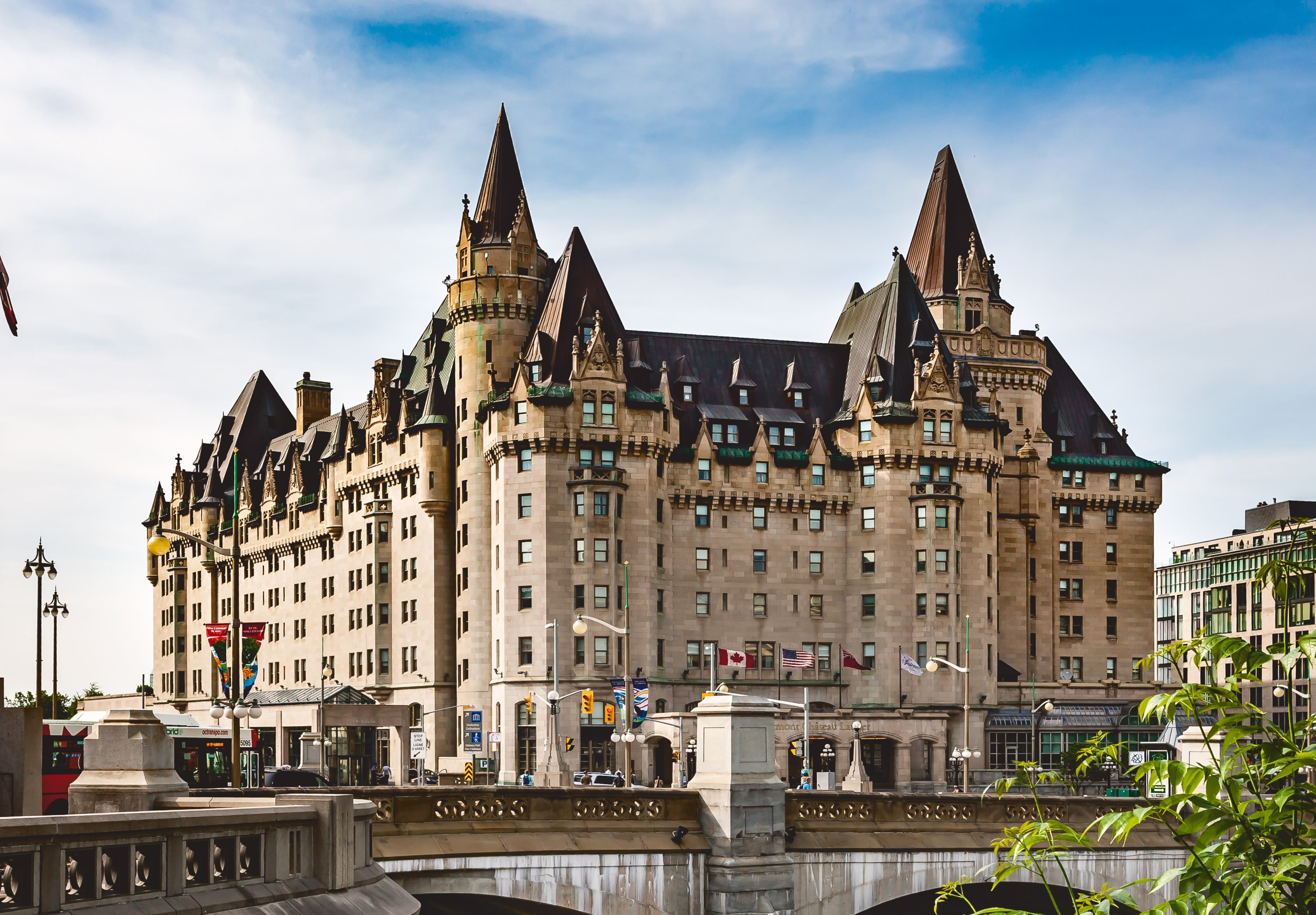
Chateau Laurier Hotel, 1 Rideau Street
(1943–1944)

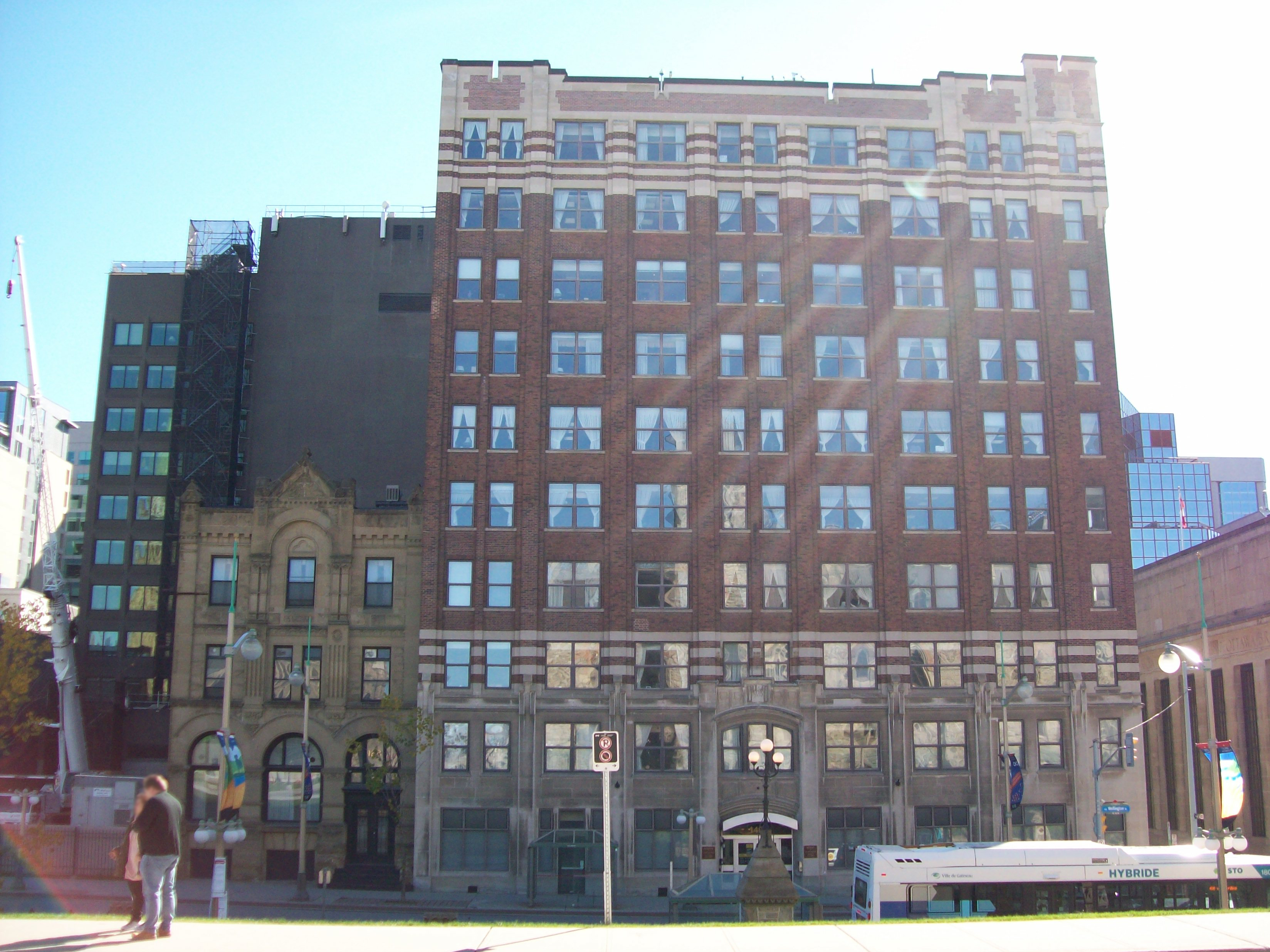
Victoria Building, 140 Wellington Street
(1958–1979)

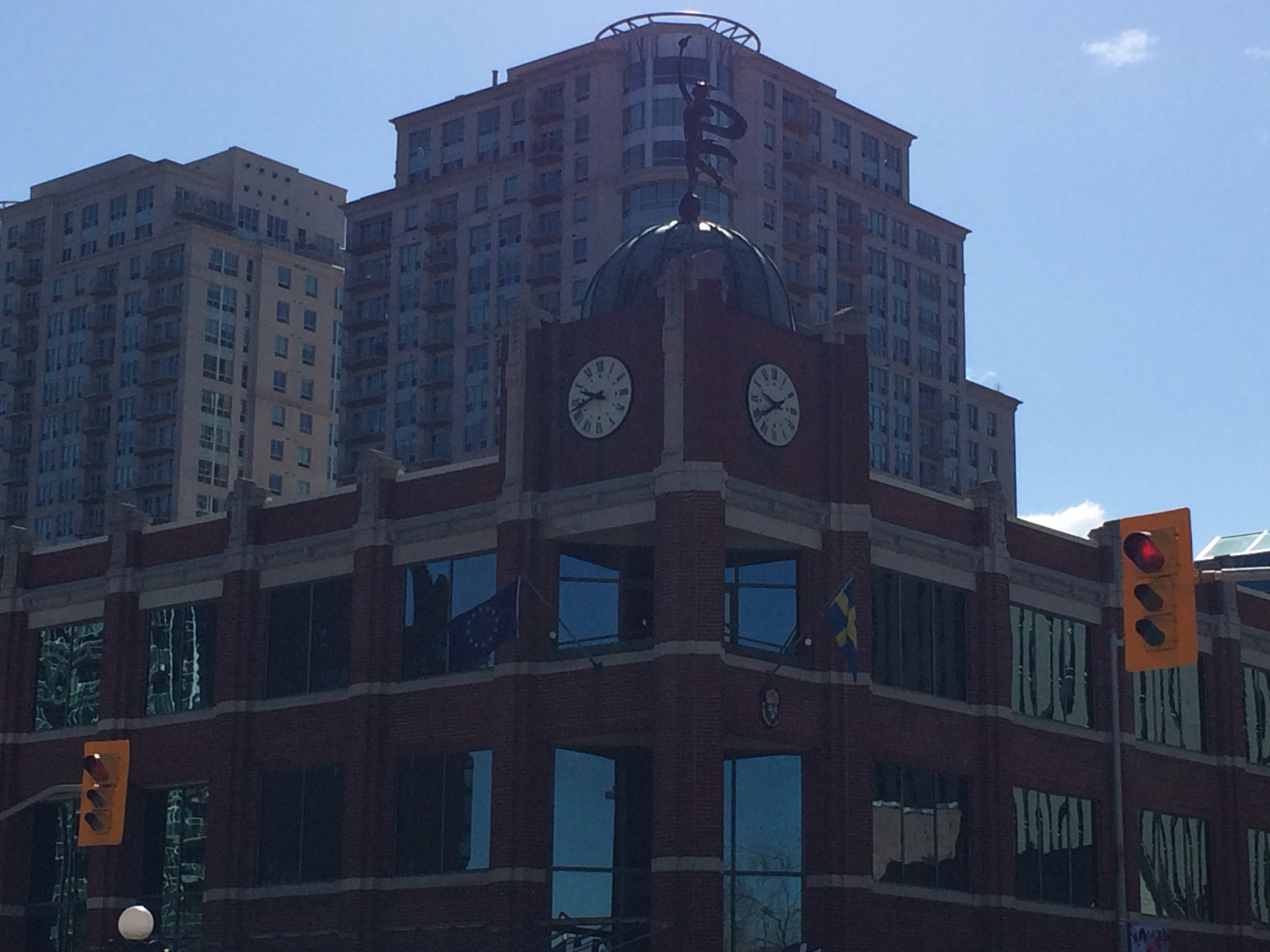
377 Dalhousie Street
(1990–present)

=== Residence ===
The ambassadorial residence is located at 700 Manor Avenue and was built in 1913. The architect was Allan Keefer. Keefer has designed many of buildings in the upscale Rockcliffe Park neighborhood. This house, then called "Raewood", he designed for his brother Thomas Coltin Keefer Jr. Thomas Keefer Jr. ran into financial difficulties and in 1919 he was forced to sell the property to James William Woods, who in turn sold it on to Gilbert Emilius Fauguier in 1920. The house was then named "Ardvar". The Fauguier family also built a house for their driver "Ardvar Cottage", which is still used as residence for embassy staff. In 1944, the Swedish state bought "Ardvar" from Gilbert Fauguier's widow.

The house is located on a promontory above the Ottawa River. The house has two floors and a basement. It is built in solid red brick and the roof is clad with slate tiles. The building style is called Queen Anne Revival architecture and the house has a Flemish-inspired balustrade on the garden side facade. One is crowned with a large plastered pine cone. The residence has two main facades. One faces south, where there is the driveway and the entrance. The other to the north overlooks the river and Acacia Avenue, which you can reach through a gate. Previously, the tram passed by here with its own stop, which from the beginning was the Keefers family. The representation part of the house houses a hall, three lounges, a library, a large and small dining room, staff rooms, a kitchen and guest toilets. In the private part there are four bedrooms, living room, kitchen and three bathrooms.

In 1986, the predecessor of the National Property Board of Sweden, the National Swedish Board of Public Building (Byggnadstyrelsen), completed an extension. It included the large dining room and a laundry room in the basement as well as a wing with staff rooms and stairwells to the basement. At the same time, all bathrooms were modernized. The architect was the local architectural firm Murray & Murray Associates. Since then, the National Property Board of Sweden, has installed new boilers for city gas in 2001 and renovated the kitchen in 2005. In addition to the residence, there is the staff housing building with a private garden, two garages, garden storage and a gazebo on the site. In 1986, about 3,500 sqm was cut off of the plot and sold. The garden is park-like. Today it covers about 19,000 sqm.

== See also ==
- Canada–Sweden relations
- Consulate General of Sweden, Montreal
