= Swedish Americans =

American of Swedish birth or descent

Svenskamerikaner (Swedish)
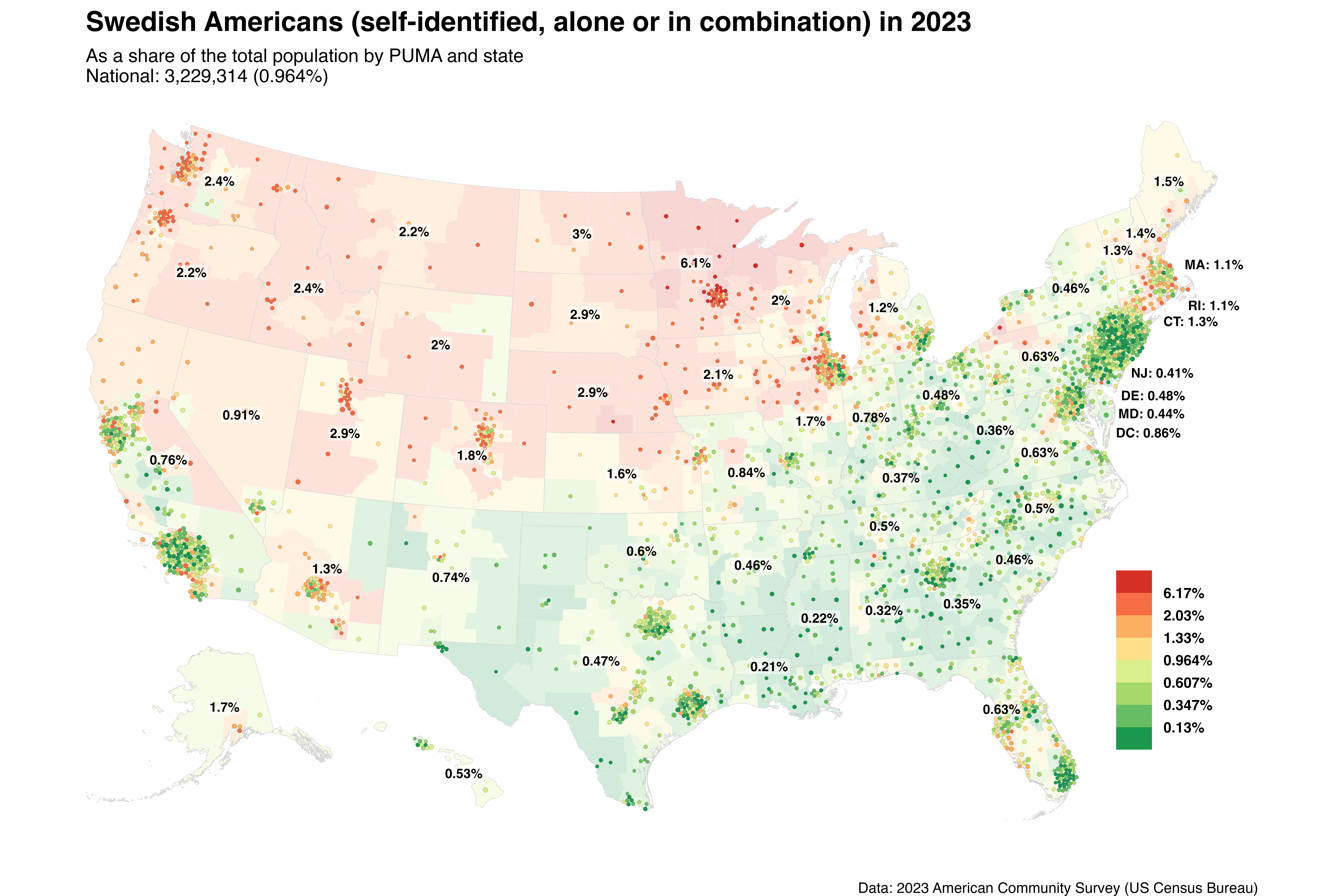

Total population
- 3,251,869 (0.96%) alone or in combination 2024 estimate, self-reported 768,809 (0.2%) Swedish alone 2021 estimate, self-reported

Regions with significant populations
- Most prevalent in the Midwestern United States; New York; Massachusetts; Pennsylvania; Ohio; Michigan; Illinois; Wisconsin; Georgia; Florida; Minnesota; Louisiana; Oklahoma; Texas; Washington; Colorado; Utah; California

Languages
- American English (accent), Swedish

Religion
- Predominantly Lutheranism (denominations), Protestantism, Mormonism

Related ethnic groups
- Swedes, Swedish Britons, Swedish Canadians, Swedish Australians, Scandinavian Americans, Danish Americans, Norwegian Americans, Icelandic Americans

The language spread of Swedish in the United States according to U. S. Census 2000.

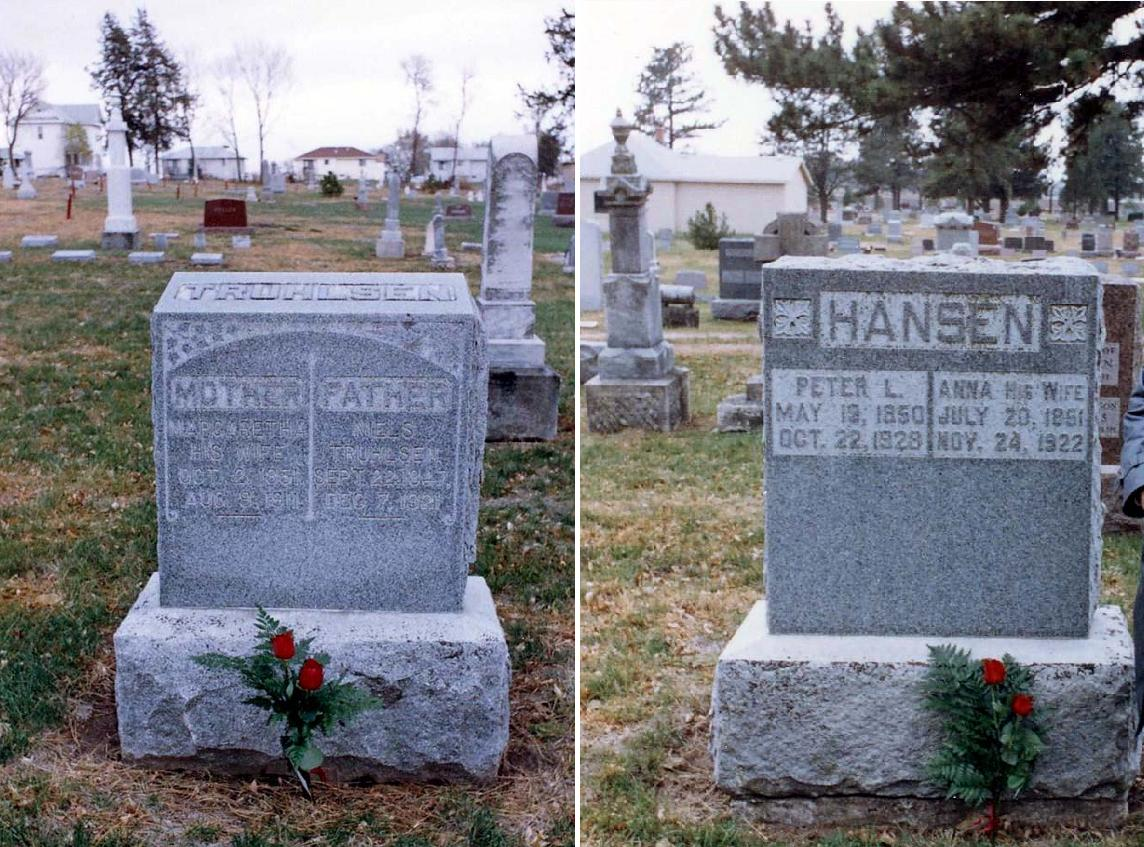
Graves of Swedish American pioneer siblings Niels Truhlsen (grandfather of Stanley M. Truhlsen) and Anna Truedsdotter Hansen in Blair, Nebraska.

Swedish Americans (Swedish: Svenskamerikaner) are Americans of Swedish descent. The history of Swedish Americans dates back to the early colonial times, with notable migration waves occurring in the 19th and early 20th centuries and approximately 1.2 million arriving between 1865 and 1915. These immigrants settled predominantly in the Midwest, particularly in states like Minnesota, Illinois, and Wisconsin, in similarity with other Nordic and Scandinavian Americans. Populations also grew in the Pacific Northwest in the states of Oregon and Washington at the turn of the twentieth century.

As a community, Swedish Americans have contributed to various aspects of American life, including politics, the arts, sciences, and business. They brought with them distinct cultural traditions like unique culinary practices, language, and celebrations such as Midsummer. These traditions are preserved by institutions such as the American Swedish Institute in Minneapolis, the American Swedish Historical Museum in Philadelphia, Chicago's Swedish American Museum, and the Gammelgården Museum in Scandia, Minnesota.

== Migration ==
=== Colonial ===
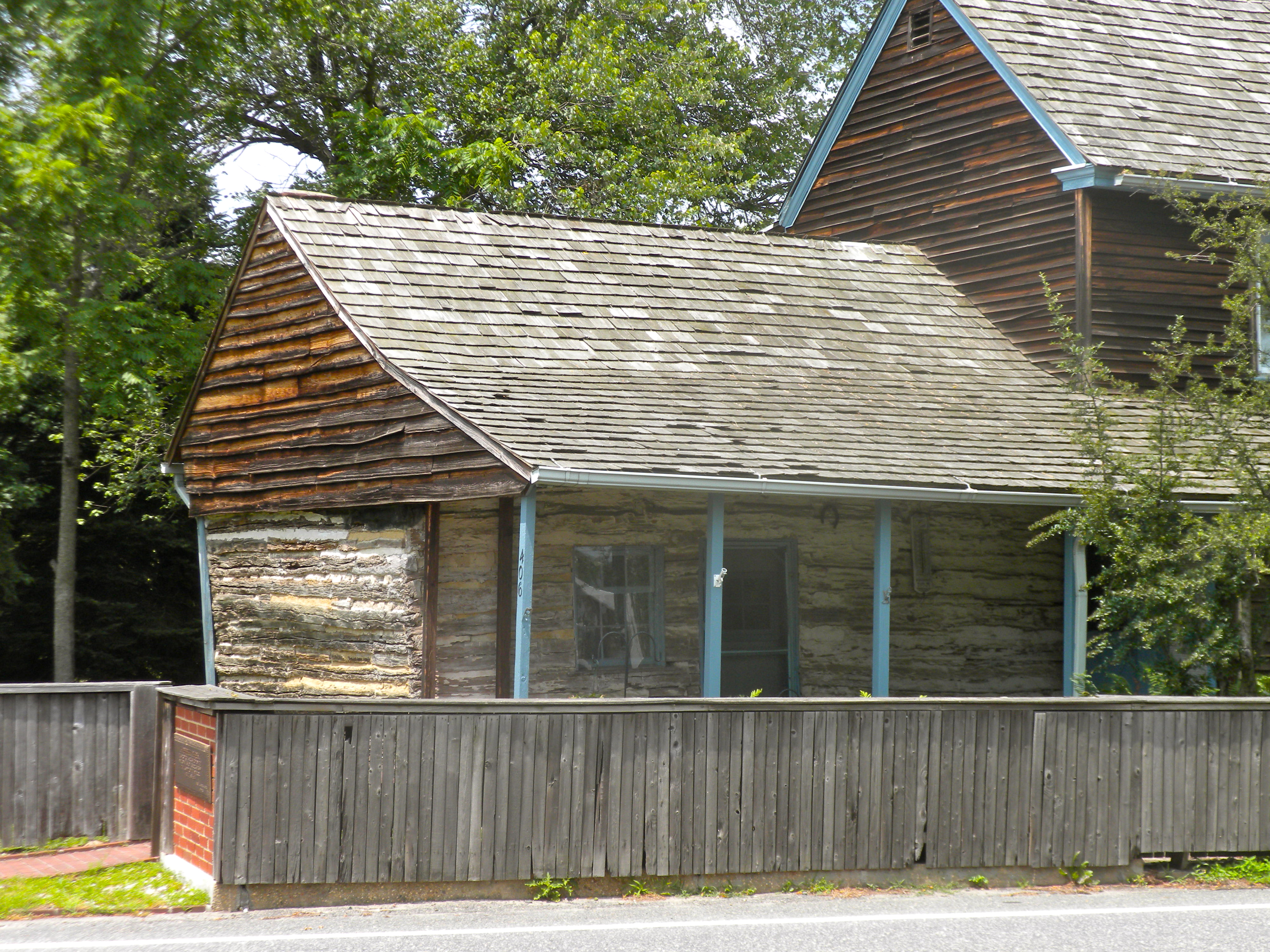
The C. A. Nothnagle Log House (c. 1638) in New Jersey is one of the oldest surviving houses from the New Sweden colony and is one of the oldest log cabins and houses in the U.S.

The first Swedish Americans were the settlers of New Sweden: a colony established by Queen Christina of Sweden in 1638. It centered around the Delaware Valley including parts of the present-day states of Delaware, New Jersey, and Pennsylvania. New Sweden was incorporated into New Netherland in 1655, and ceased to be an official territory of the Realm of Sweden. However, many Swedish and Finnish colonists remained and were allowed some political and cultural autonomy.

A victim of one of the earliest recorded murders in North America was an immigrant from Sweden. In 1665, in Brooklyn, New York, Barent Jansen Blom, progenitor of the Blom/Bloom family of Brooklyn and the lower Hudson Valley, was stabbed to death by Albert Cornelis Wantenaer.

Present day reminders of the history of New Sweden are reflected in the presence of the American Swedish Historical Museum in Philadelphia, Fort Christina State Park in Wilmington, Delaware, Governor Printz Park, and the Printzhof in Essington, Pennsylvania.

=== Midwest ===
Swedish emigration to the United States had reached new heights in 1896, and it was in this year that the Vasa Order of America, a Swedish American fraternal organization, was founded to help immigrants, who often lacked an adequate network of social services. Swedish Americans usually came through New York City and subsequently settled in the upper Midwest. Most were Lutheran and belonged to synods now associated with the Evangelical Lutheran Church in America, including the Augustana Evangelical Lutheran Church. Theologically, they were pietistic; politically they often supported progressive causes and prohibition.

In the year 1900, Chicago was the city with the second highest number of Swedes after Stockholm, the capital of Sweden. By then, Swedes in Chicago had founded the Evangelical Covenant Church and established such enduring institutions as Swedish Covenant Hospital and North Park University. Many others settled in Minnesota in particular, followed by Wisconsin; as well as New York, Pennsylvania, Michigan, Iowa, Nebraska, Kansas and Illinois. Like their Norwegian American and Danish American brethren, many Swedes sought out the agrarian lifestyle they had left behind in Sweden, as many immigrants settled on farms throughout the Midwest. There are towns scattered throughout the Midwest, such as Lindsborg, Kansas and Lindström, Minnesota, that to this day continue to celebrate their Swedish heritage.

=== New York and Pennsylvania ===
The port of New York, imports of Swedish iron, and the prevalence of Swedish mariners factored in making New York City the principal port of entry for Swedish immigrants. Swedes have been persistent during the long history of New York City, but have never been a major immigrant group in the metropolitan region. The place name for the Bronx has its origins in the early settler Jonas Bronck, who was part of the New Netherland colony in 1639 and likely of Swedish origin. A Swedish neighborhood along Atlantic Avenue in Brooklyn developed beginning in the 1850s.

An early community of Swedish immigrants (1848) became established in northwestern Pennsylvania and western New York stemming from the port of Buffalo connecting the Erie Canal with the Great Lakes. Jamestown, New York, became a principal Swedish American city during the peak of Swedish immigration. The Swedish American community in this area often served as a stepping stone for immigrants who settled in the Midwest, especially early communities in Illinois and Minnesota, as well as Massachusetts.

=== New England ===
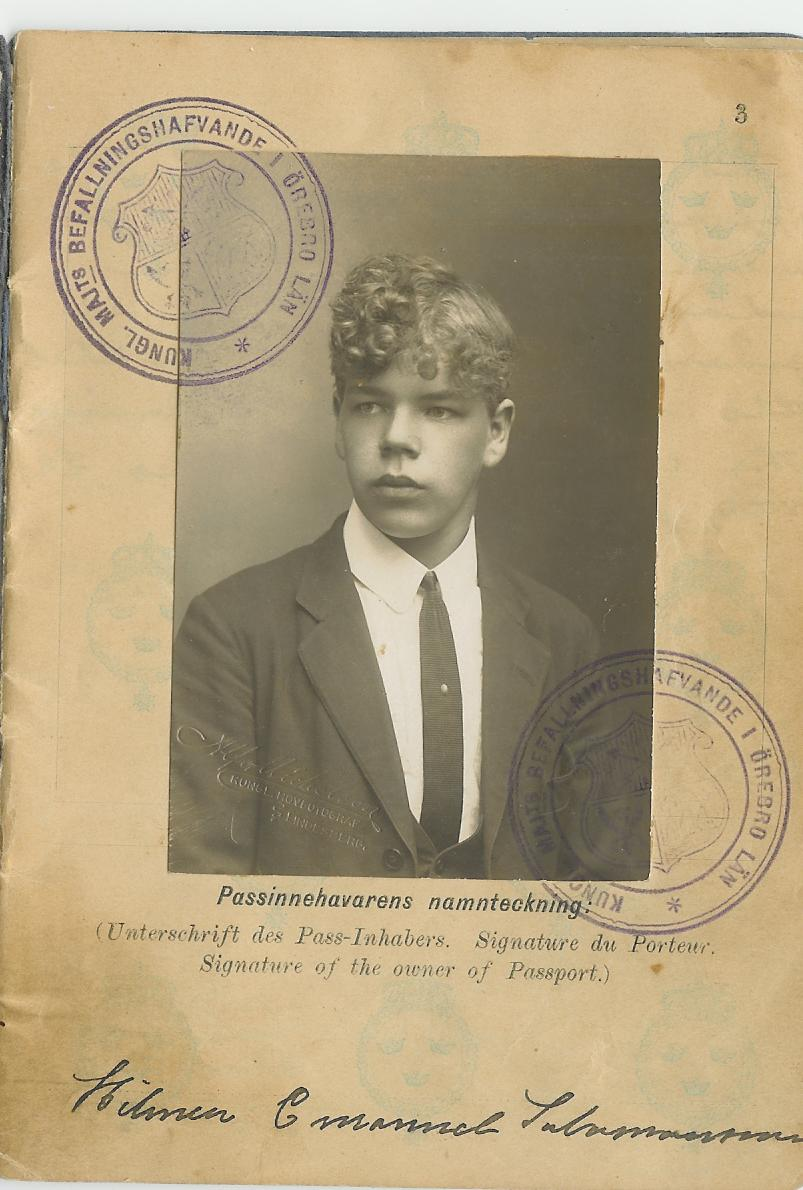
The passport of Hilmer Emmanuel Salomonsson, 1921 From Guldsmedshyttan, Sweden to Worcester, Massachusetts

In the east, New England became a destination for many skilled industrial workers and Swedish centers developed in areas such as Jamestown, New York; Providence, Rhode Island, and Boston. A small Swedish settlement was also started in New Sweden, Maine. 51 Swedish settlers came to the wooded area, led by W. W. Thomas, who called them mina barn i skogen ('my children in the woods'). Upon arrival, they knelt in prayer and gave thanks to God. This area soon expanded and other settlements were named Stockholm, Jemtland, and Westmanland, in honor of their Swedish heritage. (Stockholm is the capital of Sweden, while Jämtland and Västmanland are Swedish provinces.)

The town of New Sweden, Maine, celebrates St. Lucia, Midsummer, and Founders Day (July 23). It is a Swedish American community that continues to honor traditions of the old country. Gustaf Adolph Lutheran Church was served by a native of Sweden as recently as 1979–1985 (The Rev. Hans Olof Andræ, born 1933 in Vimmerby, Sweden) who was known to occasionally conduct special worship services in Swedish.

The largest settlement in New England was Worcester, Massachusetts. Here, Swedes were drawn to the city's wire and abrasive industries. By the early 20th century numerous churches, organizations, businesses, and benevolent associations had been organized – among them, the Swedish Cemetery Corporation (1885), the Swedish Lutheran Old People's Home (1920), Fairlawn Hospital (1921), and the Scandinavian Athletic Club (1923). These institutions survive today, although some have mainstreamed their names.

Numerous local lodges of national Swedish American organizations also flourished and a few remain solvent as of 2008. Within the city's largest historic "Swedish" neighborhood—Quinsigamond Village—street signs read like a map of Sweden: Stockholm Street, Halmstad Street, and Malmo Street among others. Worcester's Swedes were historically staunch Republicans and this political loyalty is behind why Worcester remained a Republican stronghold in an otherwise Democratic state well into the 1950s.

=== West Coast ===
Many Swedes also came to the Pacific Northwest during the turn of the 20th century, along with Norwegians and Finns, settling in Washington and Oregon. According to research by the Oregon Historical Society, Swedish immigrants "felt a kinship with the natural surroundings and economic opportunities in the Pacific Northwest," and the region experienced a significant influx of Swedish and Scandinavian immigrants between 1890 and 1910.

Notable influence can be felt in the neighborhood of Ballard in Seattle, Washington, and by the Swedish Medical Center, a major hospital also in Seattle. In Oregon, Swedish immigrant populations were concentrated in the rural areas east of Portland, and a significant Swedish community was also established in the coastal city of Astoria along with Finnish and Norwegian settlers who worked in the timber and fishing industries.

== Assimilation ==
In the 1860–1890 era, there was little assimilation into American society. The Swedish Americans attached relatively little significance to the American dimension of their ethnicity; instead they relied on an extant Swedish literature. There was a relatively weak Swedish American institutional structure before 1890, and Swedish Americans were somewhat insecure in their social-economic status in America.

An increasingly large Swedish American community fostered the growth of an institutional structure—a Swedish-language press, churches and colleges, and ethnic organizations—that placed a premium on sponsoring a sense of Swedishness in the United States. Blanck (2006) argues that after 1890 there emerged a self-confident Americanized generation. At prestigious Augustana College, for example, American-born students began to predominate after 1890. The students mostly had white-collar or professional backgrounds; few were the sons and daughters of farmers and laborers.

These students developed an idealized view of Sweden, characterized by romanticism, patriotism, and idealism, just like their counterparts across the Atlantic. The new generation was especially proud of the Swedish contributions to American democracy and the creation of a republic that promised liberty and destroyed the menace of slavery. A key spokesman was Johan Alfred Enander, longtime editor of Hemlandet (Swedish for 'The Homeland'), the Swedish newspaper in Chicago. Enander argued that the Vikings were instrumental in enabling the "freedom" that spread not only throughout the British Isles, but America as well.

Adolph B. Benson in ending the book Vår svenska stam på utländsk mark i västerled, USA och Kanada, Stockholm 1952 (pages 428–429):

An old emigrant letter, written in the summer of 1865 by a farmer in the Swedish lands of the Midwest to relatives in his home country, tells how they were at work out on the farm, when the news of President Lincoln's death reached them. In words which clearly speak of how this notice chilled them to the core, we're told of how their chores came to a halt, how their tools fell from the hands of the men, how these Swedish settlers felt as if their whole faith in life suddenly had been displaced, had collapsed. Their pain was great and gripping. This is a concrete image, taken directly from life. Lincoln, who'd brought the civil war to an end in victory, and thus put an end to slavery, to these people had become a symbol, an ideal, of freedom, of right, of law. And all this was what they valued the most in life. To a significant extent, it was also the pursuit of that ideal that had brought them the long way across the sea to the Big Country in the west.

Swedes, moreover, were among the first founders of America with their New Sweden colony in Delaware. Swedish America was present in Congress under the Articles of Confederation period, and its role was momentous in fighting the war against slavery. As a paragon of freedom and the struggle against unfreedom, and as an exemplar of the courage of the Vikings in contrast to the Catholic Columbus, Swedish America could use its culture to stress its position as loyal adherents to the larger Protestant American society.

In 1896 the Vasa Order of America, a Swedish-American fraternal organization, was founded to provide ethnic identity and social services such as health insurance and death subsidies, operates numerous social and recreational opportunities, and maintains contact with fellow lodges in Sweden. Johannes and Helga Hoving were its leaders, calling for the maintenance of the Swedish language and culture among Swedish Americans, especially the younger generation. However, they returned to Sweden in 1934 and Vasa itself became Americanized.

=== Literature ===
As a highly literate population, their output of print media was even more remarkable, and cultural leadership was exerted by numerous magazine and newspaper editors more so than by churchmen. The Swedish American press was the second largest foreign-language press in the United States (after German language imprints) in 1910. By 1910 about 1200 Swedish periodicals had been started in several states. Valkyrian, a magazine based in New York City, helped fashion a distinct Swedish American culture between 1897 and 1909. Valkyrian helped strengthen ethnicity by drawing on collective memory and religion, mythicizing Swedish and Swedish American history, describing American history, politics, and current events in a matter-of-fact way, publishing Swedish American literature, and presenting articles on science, technology, and industry in the United States.

The community produced numerous writers and journalists, of whom the most famous was poet-historian Carl Sandburg from Illinois. The harsh experiences of the frontier were subjects for novelists and story tellers, Of interest revealing the immigrant experience are the novels of Lillian Budd (1897–1989), especially April Snow (1951), Land of Strangers (1953), and April Harvest (1959). Swedish author Vilhelm Moberg wrote a series of four books about a group of Swedish-American emigrants, starting with The Emigrants (1949), which were translated in the 1950s and 1960s. They were also filmed by Jan Troell as The Emigrants and The New Land.

=== Socioeconomic mobility ===
Baigent (2000) explores the dynamics of economic and cultural assimilation and the "American Dream" in one small city. Most Swedes in McKeesport, Pennsylvania, between 1880 and 1920 were permanent settlers rather than temporary migrants. Many ended up comfortably off and a few became prosperous. They judged their success against Swedes in Sweden, not McKeesporters of other nationalities. They had no illusions about American life but they chose to stay and confront difficult living and working conditions rather than move on or return to Sweden where good jobs were scarce and paid much less.

Many of their children were upwardly socially mobile, and America offered girls in particular greater opportunities than Sweden did. The immigrants greatly valued the religious freedom that America offered, but their political freedoms were heavily circumscribed by McKeesport's "booze interest" and iron and steel bosses. Swedes dominated the prohibition movement in the town, but this did not open the door to a wider political stage. The dreams of many individual Swedes came true, but the dream of creating a permanent Swedish community in McKeesport was not realized, since individual Swedes moved on within the United States in pursuit of continued economic success. Swedish Americans formed their own social identity within the U.S. during the period through their memberships of social clubs and their deliberate membership or non-membership in different ethnically based institutions.

The story of A. V. Swanson, who in 1911 left Bjuv at age 20 and settled in Ames, Iowa, eight years later is a case study in farming and business success.

=== Working-class Swedes ===
The Swedish group was, as many other emigrant groups, highly differentiated. There still is a lot of research waiting to be done on the more urban and working-class parts of the Swedish immigrant group, where some ended up in slums like Swede Hollow in St. Paul, Minnesota, which had a population of about roughly 1,000 squatters around 1890 (slightly less in 1900, according to the census carried out that year). Child mortality was high and diphtheria and pertussis common. Many also died in work-related accidents. Drunkenness and wife beatings were also common.

Swedish housemaids were in high demand in America. Working conditions were far better than in Sweden, in terms of wages, hours of work, benefits, and ability to change positions.

=== Completion of the assimilation ===
Swedish Americans opposed entry into World War I, in which Sweden was neutral. Political pressures during the war encouraged a rapid switch from Swedish to English in church services—the older generation was bilingual by now and the youth could hardly understand the old language. Swedish language newspapers lost circulation. Most communities typically switched to English by 1920.

By the 1930s, assimilation into American life styles was almost complete, with few experiences of hostility or discrimination.

=== Preserving Swedish cultural heritage (1940–present) ===
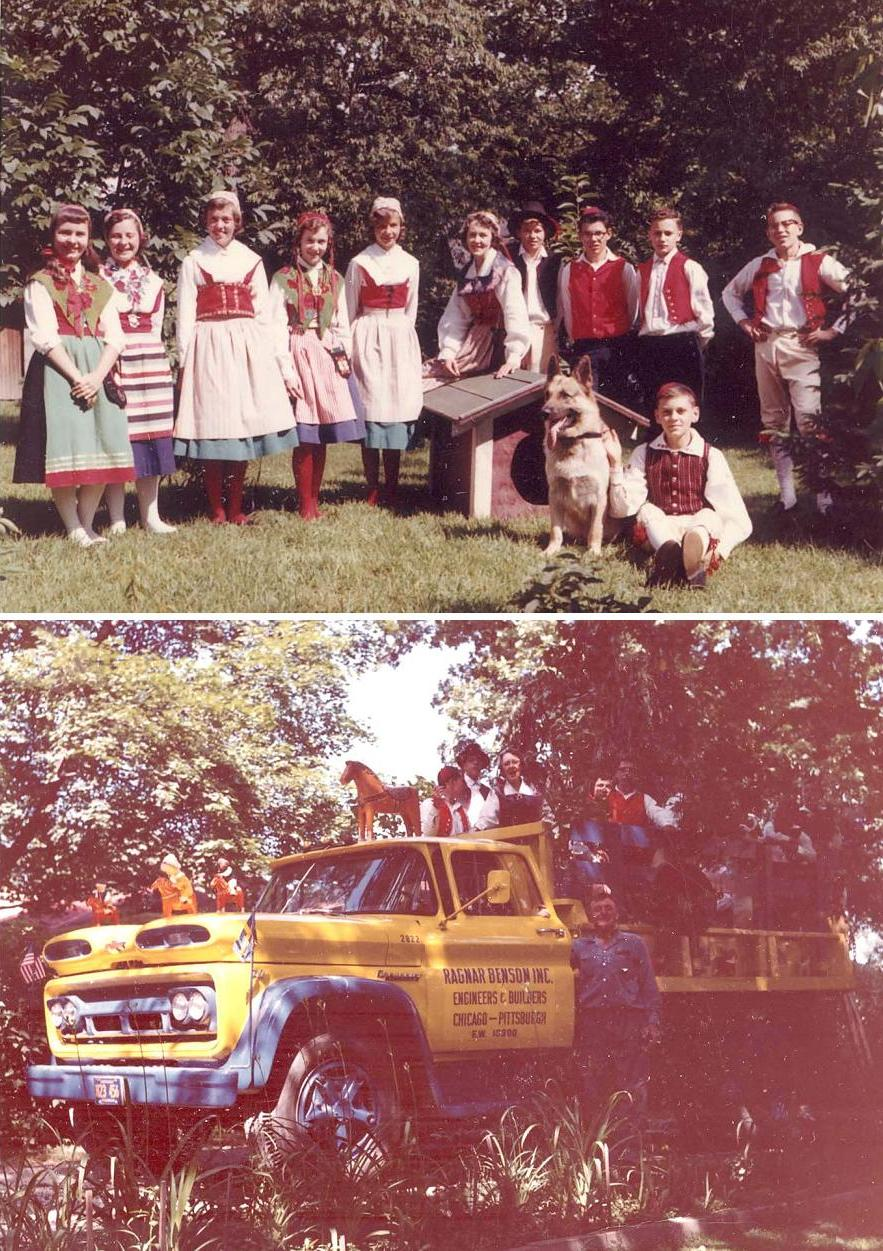
Birgit Ridderstedt at rehearsals with her young dance group for appearance in the 1960 Swedish Days Parade of Geneva, Illinois, with a Ragnar Benson truck

After 1940, the Swedish language was rarely taught in high schools or colleges, and Swedish-language newspapers or magazines nearly all closed. A few small towns in the U.S. have retained a few distinctive characteristics. For example Silverhill, Alabama; Lindstrom, Minnesota; Karlstad, Minnesota; Gothenburg, Nebraska; Andover, Illinois; Kingsburg, California; and Bishop Hill, Illinois.

Lindsborg, Kansas, is representative. It was founded by Lutheran pietists in 1869 on land purchased from the Kansas Pacific Railroad; the First Swedish Agricultural Company of Chicago spearheaded the colonization. Known today as Little Sweden, Lindsborg is the economic and spiritual center of the Smoky Valley.

The rise of agribusiness, the decline of the family farm, the arrival of nearby discount stores, and the "economic bypass" of the new interstate system wrought economic havoc on this community. By the 1970s Lindsborg residents pulled together a unique combination of musical, artistic, intellectual, and ethnic strengths to reinvent their town. The Sandzén Gallery, Runbeck Mill, Swedish Pavilion, historical museum at Bethany College, and Messiah Festival were among the activities and attractions used to enhance the Swedish image. The Lindsborg plan is representative of growing national interest in ethnic heritage, historic preservation, and small-town nostalgia in the late 20th century.

==== Organizations preserving Swedish-American culture ====
- American Swedish Historical Museum, Philadelphia, PA
- American Swedish Institute, Minneapolis, MN
- Concordia Language Villages (Swedish Language Camp)
- Gustavus Adolphus College, St. Peter, MN
- Nordstjernan (newspaper), New York, NY
- North Park University, Chicago, IL
- Scandinavian American Cultural and Historical Foundation (SACHF), Thousand Oaks, CA
- Scandinavian Heritage Foundation, Portland, OR
- Svenska Sällskapet, Minneapolis, MN
- Swedish-American Chamber of Commerce (SACC), New York
- Swedish American Chamber of Commerce (SACC), Washington, DC
- Swedish American Hospital, Rockford, IL
- Swedish American Museum Andersonville, Chicago, IL
- Swedish Council of America (SCA), Minneapolis, MN
- Swedish Covenant Hospital, Chicago, IL
- Swedish Women's Educational Association (SWEA)
- The American-Scandinavian Foundation, New York, NY
- Vasa National Archives, Bishop Hill, IL
- Vasa Order of America
- Utvandrarnas hus, Växjö, Sweden (The Swedish Emigrant Institute)
- Minnesota Historical Society Swedish American Newspaper Database

==== Locations preserving Swedish culture ====
- Bishop Hill, IL
- Center City, MN
- Chicago, IL
- Chisago City, MN
- Geneva, IL
- Jamestown, NY
- Kingsburg, CA
- Lindsborg, KS
- Lindström, MN
- Mount Jewett, PA
- New Sweden, ME
- Oakland, NE
- Rockford, IL
- Scandia, MN
- St. Peter, MN
- Stockholm, ME
- Stockholm, WI
- Thorsby, AL
- Westmanland, ME
- Wilcox, PA

==== Cities built with Swedish labor ====
- Astoria, OR
- Scotia, CA – Humboldt County

=== Swedish American holidays ===
Several holidays celebrated in Sweden have been brought to the United States by Swedish Americans. These include Trettondagen (Epiphany), Tjugondedag Knut (Saint Canute's Day), Fettisdagen (Shrove Tuesday), Valborg (Walpurgis Night), Midsummer and Lucia (Saint Lucy's Day). Some are already celebrated in the United States though somewhat differently, such as Påsk (Easter), Första Maj (May Day/International Workers' Day/Labor Day), Jul (Christmas/Yule Eve and Day), and New Year's Eve.

==== Easter ====
Swedish Easter (Påsk) is celebrated around the first week of April, when Easter is celebrated in the United States. Traditionally, Swedes celebrate by dressing up children as little Easter witches (påskhäxor) and their then going door to door asking for candy, similarly to Halloween in the U.S. More recently Swedes celebrate a typical American Easter with egg hunts and candy for the little ones to find. Swedish Americans often include påskris (an Easter bush) with twigs cut from a tree, placed in a vase with colored feathers and decorative hanging eggs added. Swedish tradition also found in Swedish American homes has a traditional påskbord, a large meal that is eaten together by families with foods such as deviled eggs, mashed potatoes, meatballs, pickled herring and other fresh fish like salmon.

==== Midsummer ====
Midsummer (Midsommar) is celebrated at the summer solstice, recognizing the longest day of the year. Many Swedes dress in traditional folk costumes, often with girls and women wearing flowered head garlands, and gather together to eat, sing traditional songs with bands playing, and dance around a maypole. Festivities begin with decorating the horizontal maypole as people gather to affix greenery first, then after thus covering most of the pole, they add various types of flowers until the whole pole is covered. The men then lift it upright while the women follow in a line behind singing as they walk around with the maypole. At the end of the song, the men place the maypole in a hole in the ground raising it to its final position. The celebrations in Sweden often last all day and night with food and alcoholic beverage accompanied with songs and snapsvisor.

=== Cuisine ===
In most parts of the United States without a significant Swedish community, the most familiar elements of Swedish American cuisine are the smorgasbord, Swedish meatballs and Swedish pancakes. IKEA also offers Swedish cuisine in the United States.

== Stereotypes ==
During the first waves of migration the Swedes were also subjected to certain stereotypes and prejudices. The expression "dumb Swede" was established as they had difficulty learning English. There were entertainment shows which used a character called "John Johnsson" when poking fun at Swedes. He was portrayed as stupid and inebriated. The bigotry extended to olfactory slurs. In 1901 Horace Glenn wrote, "Walking behind a string of Swedes is impossible to a person with delicate nose. It's an odor which could only come from generations of unwashed ancestors."

Comedian El Brendel was notable for his dialect routine as a Swedish immigrant.

The "Swede Girl" was a common stereotype of single Swedish women who were domestic workers after immigrating to the United States. Swede Girls were preferred over other laborers for their supposed high-quality work and "positive racial and ethnic qualities" according to the Social Darwinism of the late 19th and early 20th centuries. Swedish domestic workers, usually between 15 and 25 years old, often lived and worked in the homes of middle and upper middle class families, especially in the Twin Cities. Swede Girls were thought to be clean, honest, polite, and hardworking compared to other immigrants including the Irish. The 1897 play What Happened to Jones is notable for its portrayal of Helma, a Swede Girl used for comedic effect due to her inability to understand English. Helma was ridiculed in Minneapolis newspapers including the Minneapolis Tribune and The Irish Standard.

== Swedish American of the Year ==
Annually a Swedish American of the Year is awarded through Vasa Order of America District Lodges 19 and 20 in Sweden.

== Swedish-American business owners ==
- Walgreens – Charles Rudolph Walgreen
- Nordstrom stores – John W. Nordstrom
- South Coast Plaza, South Coast Performing Arts Center, Segerstrom Concert Hall, Segerstrom High School – Henry Segerstrom
- O.F. Mossberg & Sons firearms; uses Swedish iconography in their logos.
- Ragnar Benson Inc., founded by Ragnar Benson, was at the time one of the 10 largest general contracting firms in the United States. The company became one of Chicago's top builders, and erected many Fortune 500 landmark buildings.
- Greyhound Lines – Eric Wickman

== Churches ==
Formal church membership in 1936 was reported as:

- Augustana Synod (Lutheran) – 1,203 churches – 254,677 members
- Mission Covenant – 441 churches – 45,000 members
- Swedish Baptist – 300 churches – 36,820 members
- Swedish Evangelical Free – 150 churches – 9,000 members
- Swedish Methodist – 175 churches – 19,441 members

The affiliated membership of a church is much larger than the formal membership.

Other churches

- Swedish Seaman's Church – located in many states
- Church of Sweden, Los Angeles – Svenska kyrkan
- Danish Church

Until 2000, the Church of Sweden was the official state church of Sweden.

== Nobel Conference ==
The Nobel Conference is an academic conference held annually at Gustavus Adolphus College in St. Peter, Minnesota. Founded in 1963, the conference links a general audience with the world's foremost scholars and researchers in conversations centered on contemporary issues related to the natural and social sciences. It is the first ongoing academic conference in the United States to have the official authorization of the Nobel Foundation in Stockholm, Sweden.

== Demographics ==
The distribution of Swedish Americans according to the 2000 census

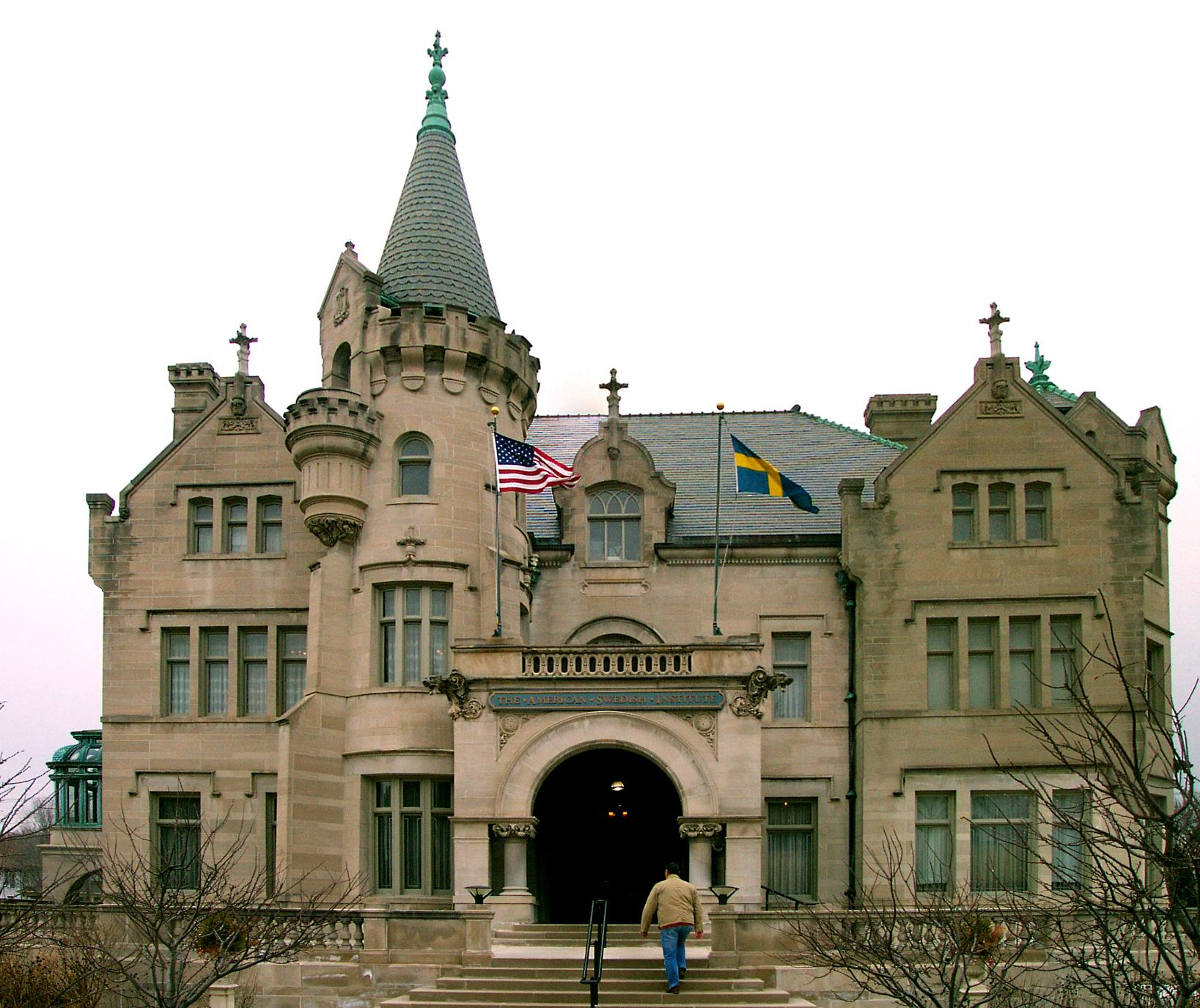
Minneapolis, Minnesota has the largest concentration of Swedes outside Sweden. The city is home to the American Swedish Institute (pictured).

A few small towns in the U.S. have retained a few visible Swedish characteristics. Some examples include Silverhill, Alabama; Cambridge, Minnesota; Lindstrom, Minnesota; Karlstad, Minnesota; Scandia, Minnesota; Lindsborg, Kansas; Gothenburg, Nebraska; Oakland, Nebraska; Andover, Illinois; Kingsburg, California; Bishop Hill, Illinois; Jamestown, New York; Mount Jewett, PA, Wilcox, PA, and Westby, Wisconsin, as well as significant areas of central Texas, including New Sweden and Georgetown, and areas in northern Maine: New Sweden, Stockholm, Jemptland, and Westmanland.

Around 3.9% of the U.S. population is said to have Fennoscandinavian ancestry (which also includes Norwegian Americans, Danish Americans, Finnish Americans, and Icelandic Americans). According to the 2005 American Community Survey, only 56,324 Americans continue to speak the Swedish language at home, down from 67,655 in 2000, most of whom are recent immigrants. Swedish American communities typically switched to English by 1920. Swedish is rarely taught in high schools or colleges, and Swedish-language newspapers or magazines are rare.

=== Swedish Americans by state ===
In 2020, Minnesota had the most Swedes, both by number (410,091) and by the percent of the state's population they make up (7.3%).

State	Swedish Americans	Percent Swedish American
United States	3,627,796	1.1%
Minnesota	410,091	7.3%
California	357,926	0.9%
Illinois	241,187	1.9%
Washington	209,559	2.8%
Florida	143,896	0.7%
Texas	140,123	0.5%
Wisconsin	138,599	2.4%
Michigan	132,003	1.3%
Colorado	122,644	2.2%
New York	109,623	0.6%
Utah	108,317	3.4%
Massachusetts	104,211	1.5%
Oregon	97,651	2.3%
Arizona	95,995	1.3%
Pennsylvania	93,901	0.7%
Iowa	78,456	2.5%
Nebraska	70,921	3.7%
Ohio	67,149	0.6%
Kansas	57,965	2.0%
North Carolina	57,417	0.6%
Missouri	55,260	0.9%
Indiana	52,950	0.8%
Virginia	52,819	0.6%
Connecticut	49,315	1.4%
Idaho	49,151	2.8%
New Jersey	48,759	0.5%
Georgia	42,287	0.4%
Nevada	32,449	1.1%
Maryland	31,399	0.5%
Tennessee	30,738	0.5%
North Dakota	29,630	3.9%
Montana	28,717	2.7%
South Dakota	26,383	3.0%
New Hampshire	25,551	1.9%
Oklahoma	23,779	0.6%
South Carolina	23,408	0.5%
Maine	21,676	1.6%
Kentucky	17,107	0.4%
Wyoming	16,125	2.8%
Rhode Island	15,721	1.5%
New Mexico	15,035	0.7%
Alabama	14,952	0.3%
Alaska	14,781	2.0%
Arkansas	13,574	0.5%
Louisiana	11,753	0.3%
Vermont	10,170	1.6%
Hawaii	9,184	0.6%
Mississippi	8,696	0.3%
Delaware	7,226	0.7%
West Virginia	5,975	0.3%
District of Columbia	5,592	0.8%

=== Swedish language ===
In 2020, 53,697 people reported speaking Swedish in the United States. The top eleven states by Swedish speakers are:

- California: 12,921
- New York: 4,492
- Texas: 4,236
- Florida: 3,776
- Washington: 2,621
- North Carolina: 1,880
- Massachusetts: 1,664
- Illinois: 1,645
- Colorado: 1,497
- Virginia: 1,362
- Minnesota: 1,350

== See also ==
- Nordic and Scandinavian Americans
- Languages of the United States#Swedish
- Swedes in America, a documentary film
- Allt för Sverige, reality show about Swedish Americans
- Sweden – United States relations
- Augustana Evangelical Lutheran Church
- Sweden-bashing
- Swedish Canadians
- Swedish American of the Year – annual award program
- The American-Scandinavian Foundation
- Swede Hollow, neighborhood of St Paul Minnesota
- Swedes in Chicago
- Swedes in Omaha, Nebraska
- Nordstjernan – Swedish-American Newspaper
- American Swedish Historical Museum
- List of Swedish Americans
- American Swedish Institute
