= Swedish American of the Year =

Swedish American of the Year (SAY)/Årets Svensk Amerikan is an annual award program of the Vasa Order of America which is run by the two Sweden District Lodges – District 19 and District 20.

== Origin ==
Since 1960, the Vasa Order of America has selected a prominent American citizen of Swedish birth or descent to become Swedish-American of the Year. Every year the two Sweden District Lodges of the Vasa Order of America select an American of Swedish descent to be The Swedish-American of the Year. The program ceased in 2020 but could be revivied with enthusiasm and networking of Swedish American organizations.

== Swedish American of the Year Awards ==
The Swedish-American of the Year is honored during Sweden-America Days in various places in Sweden. A tablet containing the names of all award recipients is kept in the Swedish Emigrant Institute (Swedish: Svenska Emigrantinstitutet) in Växjö, Småland, Sweden.

Recipients are honored with a Golden Plaque, a diploma, and their name added to the commemorative Swedish American of the Year tablet, which is kept in Växjö. They are feted with several celebrations in Sweden, including lunch at the Foreign Office, a reception at Stockholm's City Hall, activities at Skansen, a dinner hosted by Vasa, and (sometimes) a reception at the American Embassy. (Courtesy Swedish American Council of America).

Anyone is welcome to suggest a candidate, also an organization and welcome suggestions of candidates from the USA/Canada. Recipients can be either Swedish or American by birth, but must have made significant contributions to the relationship between the two countries.

The present year recipient of the award is official in March/April.

== Award recipients ==
=== 1960–1979 ===
- 1960 Rudolf F. Bannow – President (1960) of the National Association of Manufacturers (NAM) and owner of Bridgeport (machine tool brand)
- 1961 Amandus Johnson – Contributions to Swedish-American history and raising awareness of the 300 year jubilee of the Delaware Valley's New Sweden colonies
- 1962 Glenn T. Seaborg (*/**) – Chemist and winner of the 1951 Nobel Prize in nuclear chemistry. Vasa DL 15 Local Lodge 719 is named after Glenn T. Seaborg.
- 1963 Elmer Engstrom – President of the Radio Corporation of America
- 1964 Werner P. Gullander – President (1962) of the National Association of Manufacturers (NAM). Gullander lived in Palm Desert, CA and died in 2000.
- 1965 Rudolph A. Peterson (*) – President of Bank of America
- 1966 G. Hilmer Lundbeck – Executive Director of the Swedish American Line
- 1967 Karl W. Hallden – Head of the industrial firm the Hallden Machine Company
- 1968 Arleigh Albert Burke – Admiral of the United States Navy during World War II and the Korean War, and who served as Chief of Naval Operations during the Eisenhower and Kennedy administrations
- 1969 Nils William Olsson (*) – Founder and Director of Swedish Council of America
- 1970 Edwin (Buzz) Aldrin – American astronaut – with astronaut Neil Armstrong (1969), they were the first humans to walk on the Moon
- 1971 Gustav Nyselius – Founder of Mount Vernon Die Casting Company
- 1972 Gerry Rooth – Publisher of Nordstjernan, and the quarterly publication of the Vasa Star, the official magazine of the Vasa Order of America.
- 1973 Eric C. Bellquist – Professor of political science at the University of California, Berkeley
- 1974 Bertil Winström (**) – Past Grand Master of Vasa Order of America and founder of the Vasa National Archives in Bishop Hill, IL
- 1975 Wendell R. Anderson – Politician, 33rd Governor of Minnesota
- 1976 Ewald B. Nyquist – Commissioner Of Education (1969–1976) of the State of New York
- 1977 Roger Tory Peterson – Ornithologist, artist, environmentalist, and author of A Field Guide to the Birds
- 1978 Robert Orville Anderson – Founder and executive director of Atlantic Richfield Oil Company ARCO, Los Angeles Richfield Oil Corporation
- 1979 Nils Yngve Wessell (*) – President of Tufts University, Massachusetts

=== 1980–1999 ===
- 1980 Signe Karlström (*) – First woman to be named Swedish-American of the Year. Karlström dedicated her life to membership in and leadership of Swedish-American cultural organizations and strengthening ties between Michigan and Sweden.
- 1981 Curt Carlson (*) – Head of Carlson, a hospitality and travel company; its primary subsidiary is CWT, a travel management company.
- 1982 Russell Peterson – President of the National Audubon Society
- 1983 J. Erik Jonsson – Founder of Texas Instruments
- 1984 Gurli Johnson – Worked for the Salvation Army for 17 years and upheld Swedish traditions through services and radio programs
- 1985 James R. Thompson – Politician, 37th Governor of Illinois and served on the 9/11 Commission
- 1986 Franklin S. Forsberg (*) – Publisher of the Yank, Stars & Stripes, Liberty, and Popular Mechanics magazines
- 1987 Alice L. Carlson (*/**) – Grand Lodge Treasurer, Vice Grand Master, Grand Master for Vasa Order of America
- 1988 Hildor Arnold Barton – Swedish-American historian, taught at University of Alberta, University of California, Santa Barbara and Southern Illinois University
- 1989 Signe Hasso – Actress with a star on the Hollywood Walk of Fame
- 1990 Oscar A. Lundin (*) – Vice President of General Motors
- 1991 Nils Hasselmo (*) – President of the University of Minnesota 1988–1997
- 1992 John N. Nordstrom – Grandson of Nordstrom founder John W. Nordstrom. John N. Nordstrom was the past owner of the Seattle Seahawks (2016)
- 1993 William Rehnquist – Chief Justice of the US Supreme Court
- 1994 Arne H. Carlson – Politician, 37th Governor of Minnesota
- 1995 Richard E. Oldenburg – Director of the Museum of Modern Art (MoMA) New York.
- 1996 Siri M. Eliason (*) – Started a Scandinavian furniture business and served as the Sweden Honorary Consul General in San Francisco
- 1997 Arnold Lindberg – Career as Technical Director at Disney World
- 1998 Glen E. Brolander (*) – Founding force for the Swenson Swedish Immigration Research Center.
- 1999 Rod Johnson (*) – Swedish woodcarving

=== 2000–2019 ===
- 2000 Helena Hernmarck – Textile artist
- 2001 Ann-Margret Olsson – Actress, performer
- 2002 Lyndon L. Olson Jr. – US Ambassador to Sweden 1998–2001
- 2003 Marilyn Carlson Nelson – Head of Carlson and subsidiary CWT. Carlson-Nelson is the daughter of founder Curt Carlson.
- 2004 Lars Lerup – Architectural design author, lecturer and exhibitor
- 2005 Jeanne Eriksson Widman (**/Vasa DL 4) – Founder of the Scandinavian Accordion Club of New York. Her father, Walter Eriksson, was an accordion musician and had radio shows in New York.
- 2006 Agneta Nilsson (*/**/Vasa DL 15) – Founder of Swedish Women's Educational Association (SWEA)
- 2007 E. Jan Hartmann (*) – Chair, president and CEO of Ziebart International Corp.
- 2008 Barbro Sachs-Osher – Publisher of Vestkusten, a Swedish-language newspaper.
- 2009 Anne–Charlotte Hanes Harvey (*/**/Vasa DL 15) is Professor Emerita of Theater at San Diego State University.
- 2010 John Norton
- 2011 Kerstin Lane (*) – Founder of the Swedish American Museum with friend and fellow Swedish immigrant Kurt Mathiasson
- 2012 Ingvar Wikström – Entrepreneur for Swedish food culture
- 2013 Martina Arfwidson – Founder of FACE Stockholm
- 2014 C. Fred Bergsten
- 2015 Emily Tepe – Musician
- 2016 Nils Lofgren – Musician
- 2017 Jan Eliasson – Swedish diplomat who was Deputy Secretary-General of the United Nations from July 2012 to December 2016
- 2018 Bruce Karstadt – President/CEO of the American Swedish Institute
- 2019 Eric Nelson – CEO of the National Nordic Museum

(* denotes a member of the Swedish Council of America (SCA) Board of Directors)

(** denotes a member of Vasa Order of America (VOA))
