= Etymology of Jämtland =

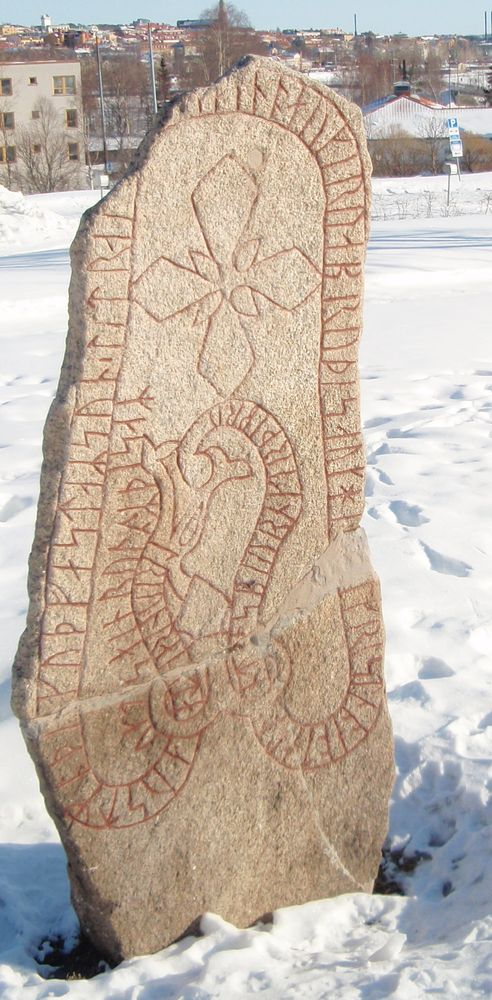
Frösö Runestone

The place-name Jämtland dates back to 11th century Scandinavia. The name is first found on the northernmost runestone in Europe, the Frösö Runestone, as eotalont (in normalized Old Norse: Jamtaland). The prefix Jamta is a genitive plural case of Jamts, a Germanic tribe. The root of Jamt (Old West Norse: jamti), and thus Jämtland, derives from the Proto-Germanic word stem emat- meaning persistent, efficient, enduring and hardworking. So Jämtland basically mean "Jamts' land" or "land of hardworking people".

A folk explanation is that the name ought to have something to do with the even parts around the lake Storsjön. This theory is based on the similarity between the Swedish words jämt (from emat-) and jämnt (from Germanic *ebna, "even")

The form Jämtland [ˈjɛ̌mːtland] is Swedish, which previously (pre 20th century) was spelled Jemtland, as it still is in e.g. Danish, whilst the local name of the province is Jamtland (pronounced [ˈjamtˌlanː], or more traditionally [ˈjɑmpˌlænː]). There have been several Latinized forms of the name, such as Jemtia, Iempihia and Iemthalandia.

== Origin ==
How and when the Jamts got their name is unknown, though one possible explanation is presented in the Icelandic work Heimskringla from the 13th century.

Ketill jamti, son Önundar jarls or Sparabúi, fór austr um Kjöl, ok mikill mannfjöldi með honum, ok höfðu búferli sitt með sér. Þeir ruddu markir ok bygðu þar stór heruð; þat var síðan kallat Jamtaland.

Translation:

Ketil Jamti, son of Earl Onund of Sparbu (in Trøndelag), went east over the Keel, together with a great many others, taking along their livestock. They cleared the forest and cultivated a large district. Later, this was called Jamtaland.

— Snorri Sturluson, Saga Hákonar góða in Heimskringla.

== Development ==
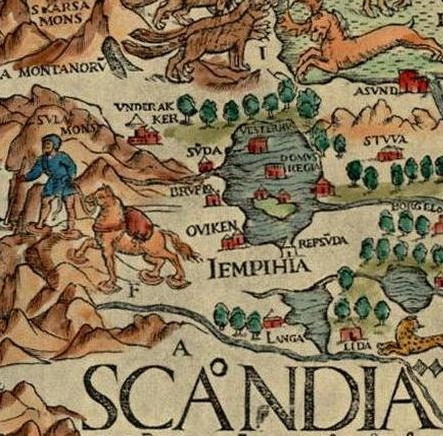
Detail from Carta Marina, Jämtland is Latinized as Iempihia

In older sources the province's name can be found in forms such as Jamptaland and Jamptalande with a p. Later a sound change occurred in East Scandinavian from a into e, the so-called i-mutation. This led to new forms such as Jempteland. The sound change eventually spread northwards although it never made itself apparent in the province's own dialects where the a was preserved. The genitive case (now both a and e, depending on the area) was ultimately dropped everywhere, leading to a reduction of the three consonant mpt. In Swedish and Danish the p was dropped, which resulted in the form Jemtland. This did not happen in Jamtlandic where the t was lost which resulted in the form Jamplann (when nd was assimilated into nn). This form was commonly used in regional speech until the 20th century when an altered version, Jamtlann became prominent. In Swedish, the form Jemtland was still commonly used and when the letter ä became "modärn" in the early 20th century the province's spelling changed into Jämtland. This never happened in Danish (and thus not in Norwegian either), where the spelling with an e remained. In Icelandic and New Norwegian (Nynorsk) it is still spelled Jamt(a)land.

Settlements like Jemtland in Ringsaker, Norway and Jemtland in Maine, United States both use an older spelling, given that the time they were settled by Jamtish emigrants the form Jämtland hadn't reached official status. When Jämtland was occupied by Sweden in the 16th and 17th century many Jamts fled from their province and founded villages like Jamtøya, Jamtgarden and Jamtåsen in Trøndelag, Norway.
