= Iva (musician) =

American singer-songwriter

IVA
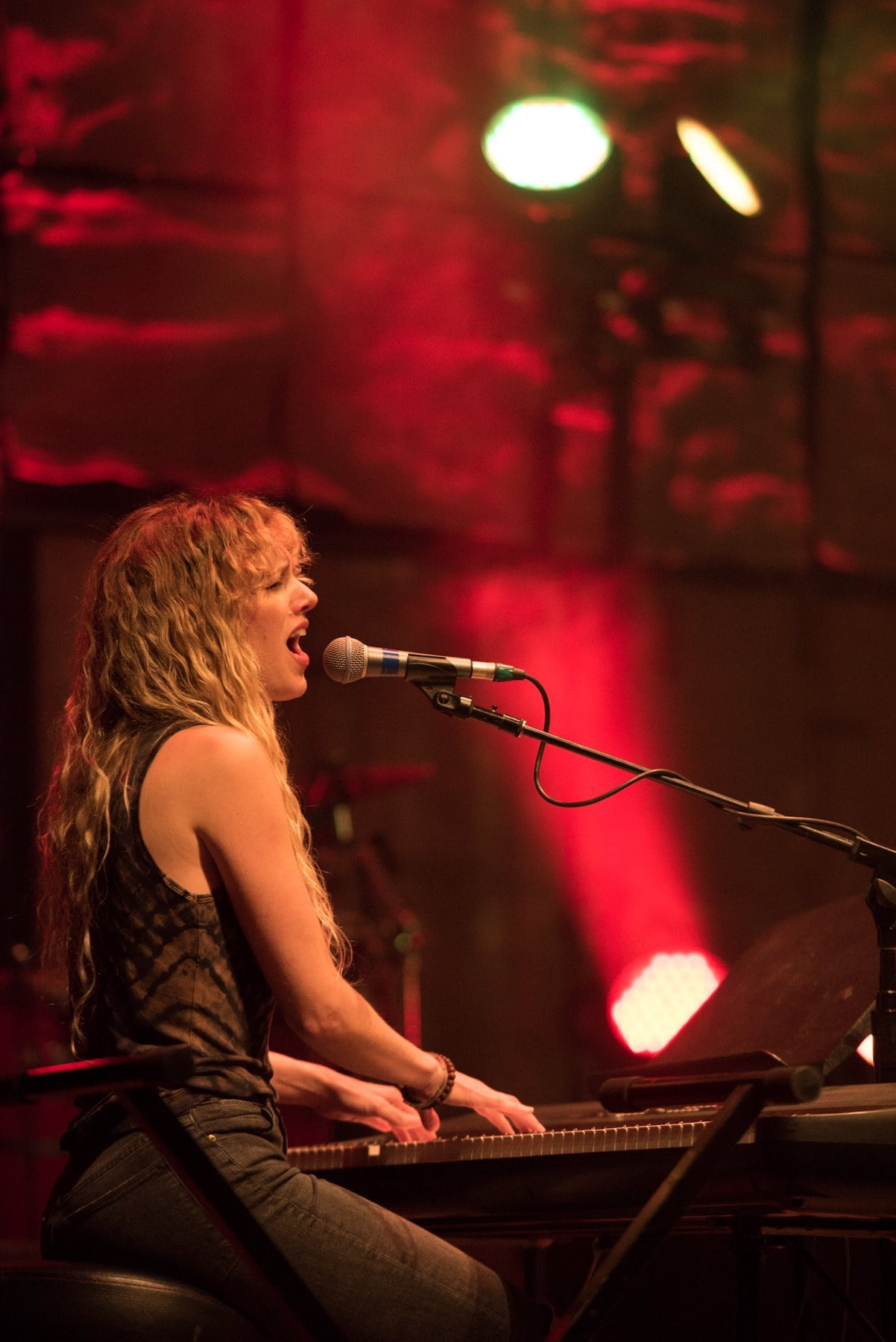
- IVA live at the Queen 2017

Background information
- Born: Emily Samson Tepe; January 20, 1978 (age 48); Wilmington, Delaware, U.S.
- Genres: Vocal music, Pop
- Occupations: Operatic Singer-Songwriter, Composer, Vocal Coach
- Instruments: Vocals, Guitar, Piano
- Years active: 2004-present
- Website: www.ivavoice.com

Emily Tepe (born 20 January 1978), known professionally as IVA, is a Swedish-American crossover artist, singer songwriter, opera singer, bandleader and composer.

== Early life ==
From Wilmington, Delaware, Emily Tepe was born into a musical family as she was influenced by her grandfather, an oboe player and multi-instrumentalist who led ensembles throughout his life. One of his friends, Evelyn Swenson, a well-known composer and conductor at Opera Delaware, took Emily under her wing and put her on stage at the age of nine.

== Music career ==
Emily would start her music career at the age of nine by being mentored by Evelyn Swenson at the Opera Delaware, where she sang. Emily trained as a classical soprano at the Juilliard School and Manhattan School of Music and graduated from Princeton University's performance program. Throughout her years of studying, she was mentored by numerous notable teachers, including W. Stephen Smith, Kishti Tomita, and Don Marrazzo, who apprenticed with Celine Dion's vocal teacher William Riley. At the end of her conservatory training, Emily received a Fulbright scholarship to study her ancestors' music in Sweden, where she lived for six years.

Emily's first breakthrough was her first appearance on Late Night with Conan O’Brien. On May 12, 2009, Emily released her first independent album, “Ivolution” which be picked up by Universal Sweden.

In 2015, she was named the “Swedish American of the Year” for her contributions in the cultural exchange between Sweden and the United States. Previous laureates include actress and singer Ann-Margret, lunar astronaut Buzz Aldrin, Chief Justice William Rehnquist, and E Street Band Member Nils Lofgren On July 10, Emily released her EP "Leap".

Emily currently teaches voice, gives readings of her opera libretto, and leads workshops in singing and songwriting at the New School for Jazz and Contemporary Music, The Brooklyn Music School, and private studio. On January 28, 2022, Emily released the single "Run". In February 2022, IVA has announced her residency with Brooklyn Music School. As part of the residency, IVA will give a reading of her opera libretto and lead workshops in singing, songwriting, and performing with her band.

== Discography ==
=== Albums ===
- IVA (2006)
- Ivolution (2009)

=== EPs ===
- Leap (2015)
- Traitor (2019)

=== Singles ===
- Run (2021)

== Awards and nominations ==
- Swedish American of the Year (2015)
