= Swedish American Museum =

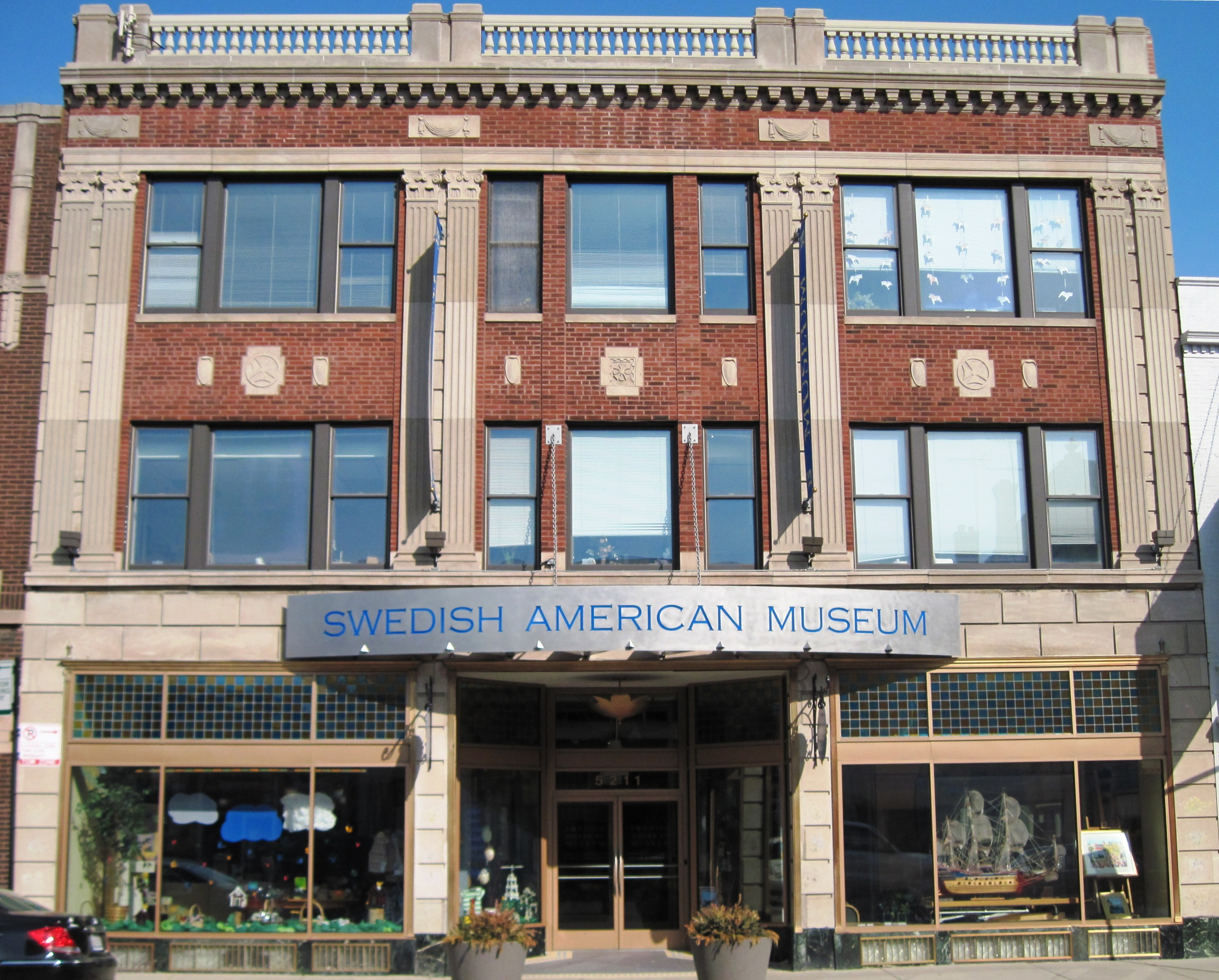
- Established: 1976
- Location: 5211 North Clark Street; Chicago, Illinois 60640
- Coordinates: 41.97666°N 87.66814°W
- Type: Heritage Museum
- Visitors: 43,000 (2008)
- Director: Karin Moen Abercrombie
- Public transit access: UPN Ravenswood; Red Berwyn
- Website: www.samac.org

Swedish American Museum is a museum of Swedish American topics and the Swedish emigration to the United States, located in the Andersonville neighborhood of Chicago.

The Swedish American Museum Association of Chicago has EIN of 36–3107115 as a 501(c)(3) Public Charity; in 2024, it claimed total revenue of $1,026,557 and total assets of $7,227,780.

The Swedish American Museum in Chicago was founded by Kurt Mathisson in 1976. It moved to its current location on 5211 North Clark Street in 1987. King Carl XVI Gustaf of Sweden was present at the museum's founding and at its move to its new home. The museum is housed in a 24,000-square-foot (2,200 m^{2}), three-story building and has a collection of approximately 12,000 objects. It is a core member of the Chicago Cultural Alliance, a consortium of 25 ethnic museums and cultural centers in Chicago.

The Museum observes many holidays, often partnering with the historically Swedish neighborhood to celebrate. Andersonville annually celebrates Midsommarfest (a take on the traditional Swedish Midsommar celebration), Santa Lucia, and Julmarknad (a Christmas market with traditional Swedish handcrafts).

The iconic water tower above the museum was removed on March 20, 2014, after being damaged during the harsh winter. It was later returned in August 2017.

In February 2024, the Honorary Consulate of Sweden, Chicago moved to the Swedish American Museum.

== See also ==
- National Nordic Museum
