= Leslie Anne Anderson =

American museum curator and art historian

Leslie Anne Anderson is an American museum administrator and art curator notable for her scholarship and exhibitions of modern and contemporary European, American, and regional art. She has worked as curator of European and American art at the Indianapolis Museum of Art (Newfields) and the Utah Museum of Fine Art. Anderson was the Chief Curator overseeing collections, exhibitions, and programs at the National Nordic Museum. She currently holds the position of Bruce A. Beal Executive Director at the Rollins Museum of Art. Anderson serves on the Seattle Arts Commission and was Chair of Seattle's Public Art Advisory Committee from 2023 to 2025.

== Early life and education ==
Anderson grew up in the Polk County, Florida city of Winter Haven and attended Lake Region High high school. She received her Bachelor of Arts cum laude in history and an MA in art history from the University of Florida. She earned an MPhil from the CUNY Graduate Center in New York City. Her areas of research and expertise include modern and contemporary art from Scandinavia, as well as other European and American regional paintings, drawings, and sculpture. In 2023, the University of Florida Alumni Association named her one of "40 Gators Under 40." In 2025, Anderson completed an eighteen-month MBA program at Emory University's Goizueta School of Business.

== Career ==
Anderson served as Samuel H. Kress Interpretive Fellow and then curatorial assistant of European and American painting, sculpture, and works on paper at the Indianapolis Museum of Art (Newfields) from 2011 until 2012 and 2014 through 2015. In June 2015, she became the curator of European, American, and regional art at the Utah Museum of Fine Art.

At the Utah Museum of Fine Art, Anderson was involved with putting together several nationally renowned exhibitions. The first exhibition, titled American and Regional Art: Mythmaking and Truth-Telling, is a major re-envisioning of the museum’s large collection of American regional art from Utah and other Western states. The exhibition earned Anderson a prestigious National Award for Excellence from the Association of Art Museum Curators. Anderson scrutinized the collection and included several renowned American and Indigenous artists such as Thomas Moran (1837–1926), Awa Tsireh (1898 – 1955), and Maria Martinez (1887–1980). The exhibition depicts the migration of people and the advancement of ideas and cultural discourse during the nineteenth century westward expansion. Anderson was also very conscious about including artists such as Edmonia Lewis (1844–1907) and Harriet Richards Harwood (1870–1922), who have been previously overlooked in the canon of American art history. Anderson acquired a pair of sculptural busts by Lewis for the Museum’s American art collection.

The second exhibition, Power Couples: The Pendant Format in Art, which was on view from July 11 through December 8, 2019, was selected by The Utah Review as one of the state’s top ten cultural moments of 2019 and won the Utah Museums Association Award for Excellence. The exhibition presented artworks from the sixteenth century to the twenty-first century that were created in pendant format, which are singular works like diptychs, which are presented in pairs. The selected works of art by artists such as Kerry James Marshall, Nina Katchadourian, Lorna Simpson, Gilbert Stuart, Konishi Hirosada, and Dirck Hals, reflected scenes from daily life, social structures, and spirituality throughout a myriad of cultures and societies.

In September 2019, Anderson was appointed as the director of collections, exhibitions, and programs at the National Nordic Museum. There, she has curated the exhibitions La Vaughn Belle: A History of Unruly Returns, which examines the legacy of Danish colonialism through Belle’s Chaney series, and the intergenerational exhibition M(other) Tongues: Bodhild and Las Hermanas Iglesias. She served as co-organizer for Among Forests and Lakes: Landscape Masterpieces from the Finnish National Gallery.

During the early stages of the COVID-19 pandemic, Anderson was instrumental in adapting the museum’s programing to support public health policies. She initiated the National Nordic Museum’s COVID-19 Oral History Project to record the experiences of individuals impacted by COVID-19 in Nordic countries and the American Pacific Northwest. Anderson also spearheaded the virtualization of educational content, delivering programs that teach the Museum’s core values of social justice and sustainability to an international audience.

In November 2021, Anderson oversaw the planning of the Nordic Innovation Summit, an industry-leading symposium that convened speakers in seven countries to discuss the impact of climate change on Arctic museums. She partnered with the American Alliance of Museums, the International Council of Museums, and the National Museum Directors’ Council to coincide with the UN Climate Change Conference (COP26). In an Op-Ed published in the Seattle Times, Anderson notes how her work at the Nordic Museum is centered around four core values that reflect millennia of Nordic history: social justice, openness, innovation and respect for nature. She encourages more museums to take part in global climate initiatives, stating that, "Hosting an innovation and technology conference may seem an unusual role for an art, history and culture museum. Yet exhibitions like FLÓÐ and programs like the Nordic Innovation Summit have shown that museums can live their mission and values while addressing the most critical issues of our time."

In the spring of 2024, Anderson and African American Studies professor Ethelene Whitmire curated Nordic Utopia? African Americans in the 20th Century, which reveals the history and work of 20th century Black American artists who sought artistic haven and inspiration within Nordic countries. These artists include Josephine Baker, Anne Wiggins Brown, Dexter Gordon, William Henry Johnson, Herbert Gentry, and Walter Williams. Anderson states that “They found a place where they could release their creativity, they could pursue opportunities that they may not have had in the States." She adds that, "We were very deliberate with the question mark (in the title) because there's no such thing as a utopia, but (the artists) for the most part talked about how their experiences–professional and personal–were improved in the Nordic countries.” The exhibition traveled to the Chazen Museum of Art in Madison, Wisconsin. An exhibition catalog was published through the University of Washington Press.

In 2024, Anderson's curatorial work at the National Nordic Museum shifted more towards contemporary art. This includes projects with artists Djurberg & Berg, Fischersund, Anne Karin Furunes, Ginny Ruffner, and Nina Katchadourian. Anderson organized a temporary installation of Ginny Ruffner's last major work, Project Aurora, which she then acquired for the National Nordic Museum's permanent collection and display.

Faux Flora, which was on view from November 2024 through February 2025, was the first-ever museum exhibition of the Icelandic family-run perfumery and art collective, Fischersund. The multisensory sculptures, installation and video in the exhibition is inspired by the native plant species in their home country of Iceland. From the existing ecosystem, Fischersund creates their own taxonomy of imaginary Icelandic plants. The results of which have been critically acclaimed with critic Gregory Volk calling it “one of the most innovative and compelling exhibitions I’ve experienced in a very long time.” He added that, “The artists and Chief Curator Leslie Anne Anderson—all of whom took considerable risks—are to be commended for this exceptional show.”

On September 15, 2025, Anderson became the Bruce A. Beal Executive Director of the Rollins Museum of Art in Winter Park, Florida. As director, Anderson will oversee the museum's relocation to a new and larger facility in downtown Winter Park.

== Selected exhibitions ==
At the National Nordic Museum

- Anne-Karin Furunes: Illuminating Nordic Archives, March 15 — June 8, 2025.
- Fischersund: Faux Flora, November 9, 2024 — February 23, 2025.
- Nordic Utopia? African Americans in the 20th Century, March 23, 2024 — July 21, 2024.
- FLÓÐ (Flood) in collaboration with Icelandic artist and musician Jónsi, March 17 — July 30, 2023.
- From Dawn to Dusk: Nordic Art from Sweden's National Museum, February 19, 2022 — July 17, 2022.
- M(other) Tongues: Bodhild and Las Hermanas Iglesias, November 4, 2021—January 30, 2022.
- Dines Carlsen: In His Own Manner, July 22, 2021—October 24, 2022.
- Among Forests and Lakes: Landscape Masterpieces from the Finnish National Gallery, May 6, 2021—October 17, 2022 (organized the National Nordic Museum’s presentation and the exclusive North American showing)
- Sublime Sights: Ski Jumping and Nordic America (curated with Washington State Ski & Snowboard Museum), April 24, 2021—July 18, 2021.
- La Vaughn Belle: A History of Unruly Returns, October 8, 2020—April 11, 2021.

At the Utah Museum of Fine Arts

- Diego Rivera's La ofrenda, October 25, 2019—October 4, 2020.
- Power Couples: The Pendant Format in Art, July 11, 2019—December 8, 2019.
- American and Regional Art: Mythmaking & Truth-Telling, August 26, 2017—Present.

At the Indianapolis Museum of Art (Newfields)

- A Land Enchanted’: The Golden Age of Indiana Art, 1877–1902, December 18, 2015—May 14, 2017.

== Selected publications ==
- Anderson, Leslie Anne, and Alison DeRiemer. “Preserving a Pandemic: The National Nordic Museum’s COVID-19 Oral History Project,” Collections: A Journal for Museums and Archives Professionals. (Focus Issue: COVID-19 & Collections). Published online 12/21/20; print version February 2021.
- Anderson, Leslie Anne. Review of “Pictures of Longing: Photography and the Norwegian-American Migration,” Norwegian-American Studies Vol. 37, Number 1.
- Anderson, Leslie Anne. “Dating Miss Maude Adams, as L’Aiglon,” Panorama: Journal of the Association of Historians of American Art Vol. 4, Issue 2 (Fall 2018).
- Anderson, Leslie Anne. “A Saint-Aubin Allegory Reconsidered,” Journal18 (October 2016).
- Anderson-Perkins, Leslie. “The Forgotten Pendant of Christian August Lorentzen’s Model School at the Academy,” Nineteenth-Century Art Worldwide Vol. 13 (Spring 2014).
- Anderson-Perkins, Leslie. “Picturing Artistic Practice at the Royal Danish Academy, 1826-1848,” Rutgers Art Review (2012): 2-16.

== Awards ==
Anderson has received several awards and honors including a Fulbright scholarship and American-Scandinavian Foundation Fellowship at the University of Copenhagen (2012–2013); a National Award for Excellence from the Association of Art Museum Curators (2018); and the Utah Museums Association Award for Excellence (2020).
