= Vasa Order of America =

Swedish–American fraternal organization

Vasa Order of America (Swedish: Vasa Orden av Amerika) is a Swedish-American fraternal, cultural and educational organization. The organization seeks to benefit its members by sharing Swedish and Scandinavian culture and heritage.

== Philosophy ==
The objects and purposes of this Fraternal Organization are to promote and share Swedish Heritage through cultural events and fellowship. In doing so, they hope to promote social and intellectual interaction among members.

== History ==
=== Vasa Order of America ===
Vasa Order of America was established in 1896 in New Haven, Connecticut at the height of Swedish immigration to the United States as a Swedish-American fraternal order. Vasa Order of America emerged from the many Swedish societies that existed as a safety net for early immigrants. Named for the House of Vasa, the historic Royal House of Sweden, it has been noted as one of the largest Swedish-American ethnic or cultural organizations

=== Vasa National Archives ===
Located in Bishop Hill, Illinois, for forty years, the Vasa National Archives houses documents of lodges and some artifacts. The purpose as described in the incorporation document is for "Educational, historical and research to preserve and display and make available records, documents, works of art, science, inventions and manufacture by persons of Swedish ancestry and to promote public knowledge of an interest in the history of persons of Scandinavian and particularly Swedish ancestry." The main purpose is to preserve the records of the Vasa Order of America and its members.

- The Vasa National Archives is a 501(c)3 and its parent organization the Vasa Order of America is a 501(c)8.
- The Vasa National Archives term of office is four years.
- The Vasa National Archives president position is held by the outgoing grand lodge grand master (ending a grand lodge four-year term).

== Vasa Star ==
The official publication of the Vasa Order of America is the Vasa Star (Swedish: Vasastjärnan) and as of summer 2013 the publication is included with Nordstjernan a Swedish American publication. Prior to this change, this was a stand-alone publication being produced several times annually.

== Organization ==
The Vasa Order comprises the Grand Lodge, 18 District Lodges, and nearly 200 local lodges. Local lodges in the United States, Canada, and Sweden offer cultural, language, and scholarship programs. The organization owns and operates the Vasa National Archives at Bishop Hill, Illinois, and administers an Old Age Benefit Fund (OAB) for members.

The organization is led by a Grand Master, Vice Grand Master, Grand Secretary, Grand Treasurer and Executive Board Members for the Eastern Region, Midwest Region, Western Region, Canada and Sweden. The Grand Lodge oversees the Grand Lodge Deputies and other Grand Lodge committees. The term of office is four years and the exiting Grand Master assumes the role of president for the Vasa National Archives for a four-year term. The Grand Lodge Convention and Annual Meeting are held once every four years and the Grand Lodge Board meetings are held at their discretion.

The organization maintains and runs the Vasa National Archives whose sole purpose is to preserve the records of the Vasa Order of America and its members.

- The Vasa Order of America and its subordinate lodges are a 501(c)8.
- The Vasa National Archives is a subsidiary organization and is a 501(c)3.
- The Vasa National Archives is supported through the Vasa Order of America members' assessments.

=== Ritual ===
The society has had a ritual since its founding. It has been revised several times, for instance in 1915 and 1923. The Order also works three degree which correspond to the Local, District and Grand Lodge levels of the organization.

=== Grand Lodge ===
The Grand Lodge officers oversee the organization and its operation.

=== District Lodges ===
The District Lodges oversee the Local Lodges and provide leadership and support. The District Lodges hold a convention or annual meeting each year or on designated years. District Lodges can be found on the web site or listed below.

== District Lodges Territory ==
- 1-Connecticut
- 2-Massachusetts
- 3-Rhode Island
- 4-New York
- 6-New Jersey
- 7-Minnesota
- 8-Lake Michigan
- 9-Pennsylvania
- 10-Superior
- 12-Golden Gate – San Francisco, CA
- 13-Pacific Northwest
- 15-Pacific Southwest No. 15 – Southern California
- 17-Iowa-Nebraska
- 19-Vasa Orden av Amerika - Sweden
- 20-Vasa Orden av Amerika - Sweden
- 21-Arizona

=== Region Districts ===
Under the jurisdiction of the Grand Lodge, the lodges in these Region Districts are provided the support and leadership through the Grand Lodge.

- Central Region
  - 248-Facklan - Lee's Summit, MO
  - 259-Strindberg - Winnipeg, Canada
  - 716-Carl XVI Gustaf - Dallas, Texas
  - 743-Carl Widen - Austin, TX
- Southeastern Region
  - 708-Nordic - Alpharetta, GA
  - 739-Carl Larsson - Raleigh, NC

Local Lodge

Each of the local lodges are managed and maintained at the local level with promoting and maintaining membership, providing enrichment activities, events, programs, outreach and scholarships. Some local lodges network with various Swedish and Scandinavian organizations bringing the organization to a different level of professionalism, business associations and friendship and interact with the social media. Lodges may offer their own education scholarships and health and benefit funds.

== Membership ==
Membership requirements have changed over the years. Originally open to men age 15–50. In 1923 membership was open to men and women of good health who could speak Swedish or had Swedish ancestry. Today membership is open to all people born in a Nordic country, of Nordic ancestry, spouses and widows of Vasa members and anyone else who is "committed to the promotion and advancement of Swedish and Nordic heritage and culture."

Membership in the Vasa Order was at its height in 1929, when the organization had 72,261 members. It has declined since, with 35,000 members in 1979 and the same number in 1994.

=== Membership Levels ===
- Active – Local Lod
- Member-At-Large – District Lodge
- Member-At-Large – Grand Lodge

== Benefits ==
=== Old age benefit ===
The Old Age Benefit Fund (OAB) is for active members, and maintained through the Grand Lodge.

=== Hospital benefit ===
Provided though some of the local lodges, and maintained through the Local Lodge or District Lodge.

=== Scholarships ===
Scholarship opportunities are available at the different levels of the organization and you will find scholarship opportunities for higher education, Foreign Exchange (Sweden only), Language camps, Swedish camps and Elder camps. The scholarships offered can be found at the Vasa Order of America website and the District Lodges and Local Lodges. The main qualification for applicants before applying for the scholarship is to be a member for two years at the Grand Lodge level and can be different at the District and Local Lodge levels.

- Grand Lodge: Higher education, language camp
- District Lodge: Higher education, language camp – varies by District
- Local Lodge: varies by lodge

=== Vasa Star ===
Included with membership are four issues of the Vasa Star which is included within the Nordstjernan publication. A reduced subscription rate is available for Vasa members to subscribe to all issues of Nordstjernan.

=== Vasa National Archives ===
With each Vasa Order membership, the member is automatically a member of the Vasa National Archives located in Bishop Hill, IL.

== Social media ==
The Grand Lodge has several social media pages as well as the Districts and Local Lodges.

== Programs, clubs and groups ==
=== Swedish-American of the Year ===
Since 1960, The Vasa Order of America has selected a prominent American citizen of Swedish birth or descent to become Swedish-American of the Year. Every year the two Sweden District Lodges of the Vasa Order of America select an American of Swedish descent to be The Swedish-American of the Year. The Swedish-American of the Year is honored during Sweden-America Days in various places in Sweden. A tablet containing the names of all award recipients is kept in the Swedish Emigrant Institute (Swedish: Svenska Emigrantinstitutet) in Växjö, Småland, Sweden.

=== Clubs and Groups ===
- Activity Clubs
- Children's Clubs
- Folk Dance Club
- Genealogy Club
- Past District Master Club
- Vasa Choir
- Youth Club

== See also ==
- Fraternity
- Fraternal Benefit Society
- Friendly Society
- Service club
- Social club
