= The Irish Standard =

Irish-American newspaper

- Type: Weekly
- Founder(s): William Kilday, Benjamin McNally, and William Malone
- Publisher: 1912 Northern Printing and Publishing Company
- Editor: Edward O’Brien; John H. Sherlock
- Founded: 1885; 141 years ago
- Ceased publication: 1920; 106 years ago
- Language: English
- City: Minneapolis, Minnesota
- Country: United States
- ISSN: 2475-2894
- OCLC number: 1639642

The Irish Standard was an Irish-American newspaper that was published in Minneapolis between 1885 and 1920.

== History ==
The newspaper was first founded on November 7, 1885, as the Northwestern Standard, an Irish-American newspaper was published in Minneapolis, Minnesota, by printers William Kilday, Benjamin McNally, and William Malone. The paper was sold on April 10, 1886, to editor Edward O’Brien, who renamed it the Irish Standard. For the next 34 years, the Standard became an important source of information on Irish life and culture. Given its broad readership among the many Irish Immigrants, the Irish Standard started focusing primarily on national and international topics, with smaller sections devoted to local Minnesota news. The paper had an eight-page, seven-column weekly format. The main concern of the paper was the Irish Home Rule movement, and had anti-British views.

On March 15, 1913, the Northern Printing and Publishing Company purchased the Irish Standard and John H. Sherlock became the editor. Sherlock retained the format, and the paper’s continued to focus on Irish-British relations during World War I. The Irish Standard offered a more nuanced vision alternative reporting to the propagandistic war news at the time. Notable were the numerous criticisms of president Woodrow Wilson for his toleration of international law violation by the British but not by the Germans. The Irish Standard also criticized Wilson’s attacks on “hyphenated-Americans” which caused uproar in Irish communities. However, the Standard endorsed the war after peace talks with Germany broke down.

The wide historical and political knowledge of the editors gave Irish Standard far more detailed coverage of international affairs than most other contemporary newspapers. In 1918, the Irish Standard anticipated the end of the First World War almost to the month. After World War I, the Irish Standard resumed its criticisms of British policies toward Ireland, reporting on the defeat of the Irish Parliamentary Party and Home Rule in 1918. The Irish war of Independence is covered extensively through the last issue of the paper, on June 19, 1920.
