= National Nordic Museum =

Museum in Seattle, Washington, U.S.

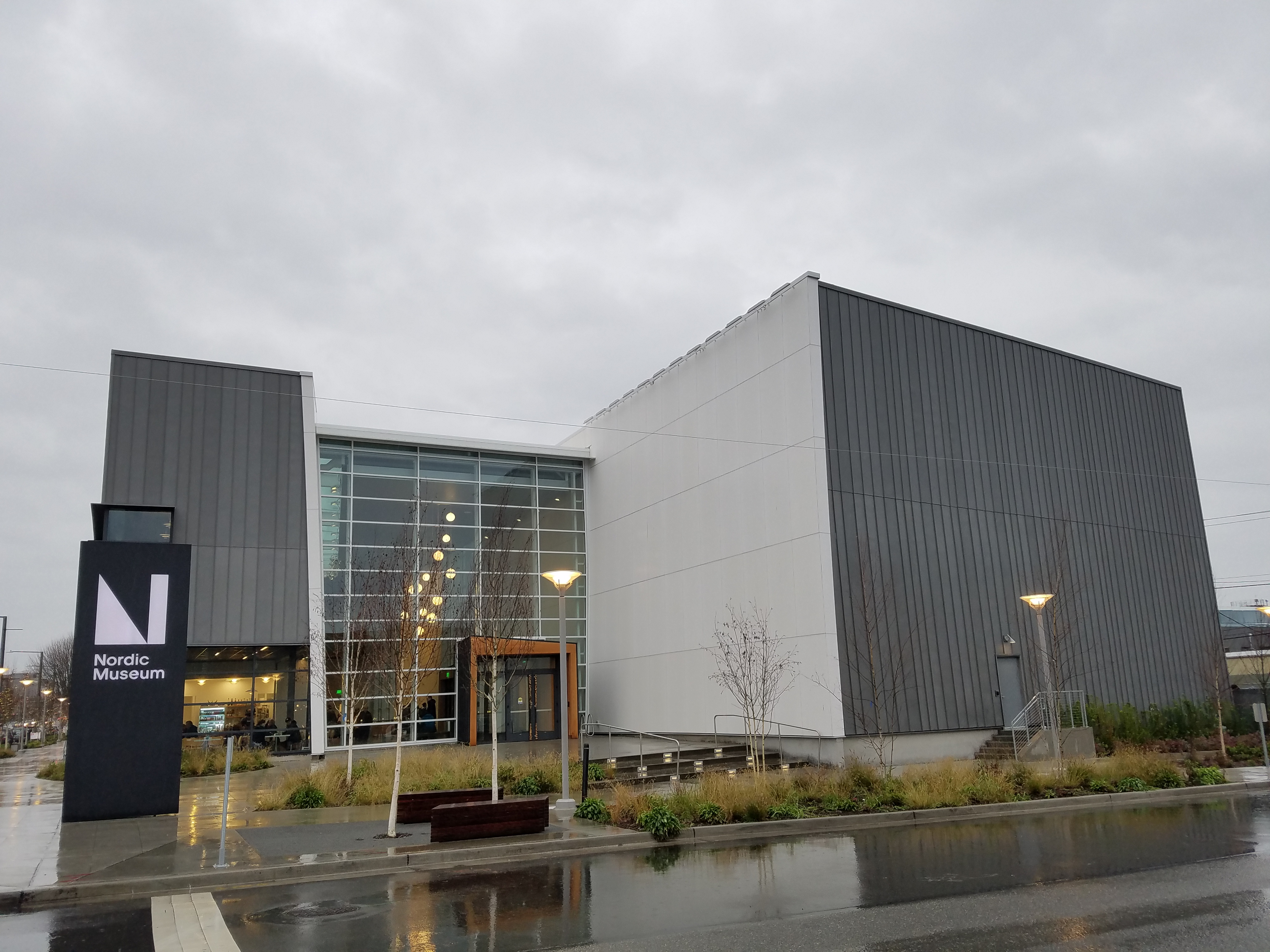
- The main entrance to the current Nordic Museum on Market Street
- Established: 1980
- Location: 2655 NW Market Street; Seattle, Washington, U.S.
- Coordinates: 47°40′06″N 122°23′33″W
- Type: Heritage center
- Director: Lāth Carlson
- President: Jay L. Bruns
- Website: nordicmuseum.org

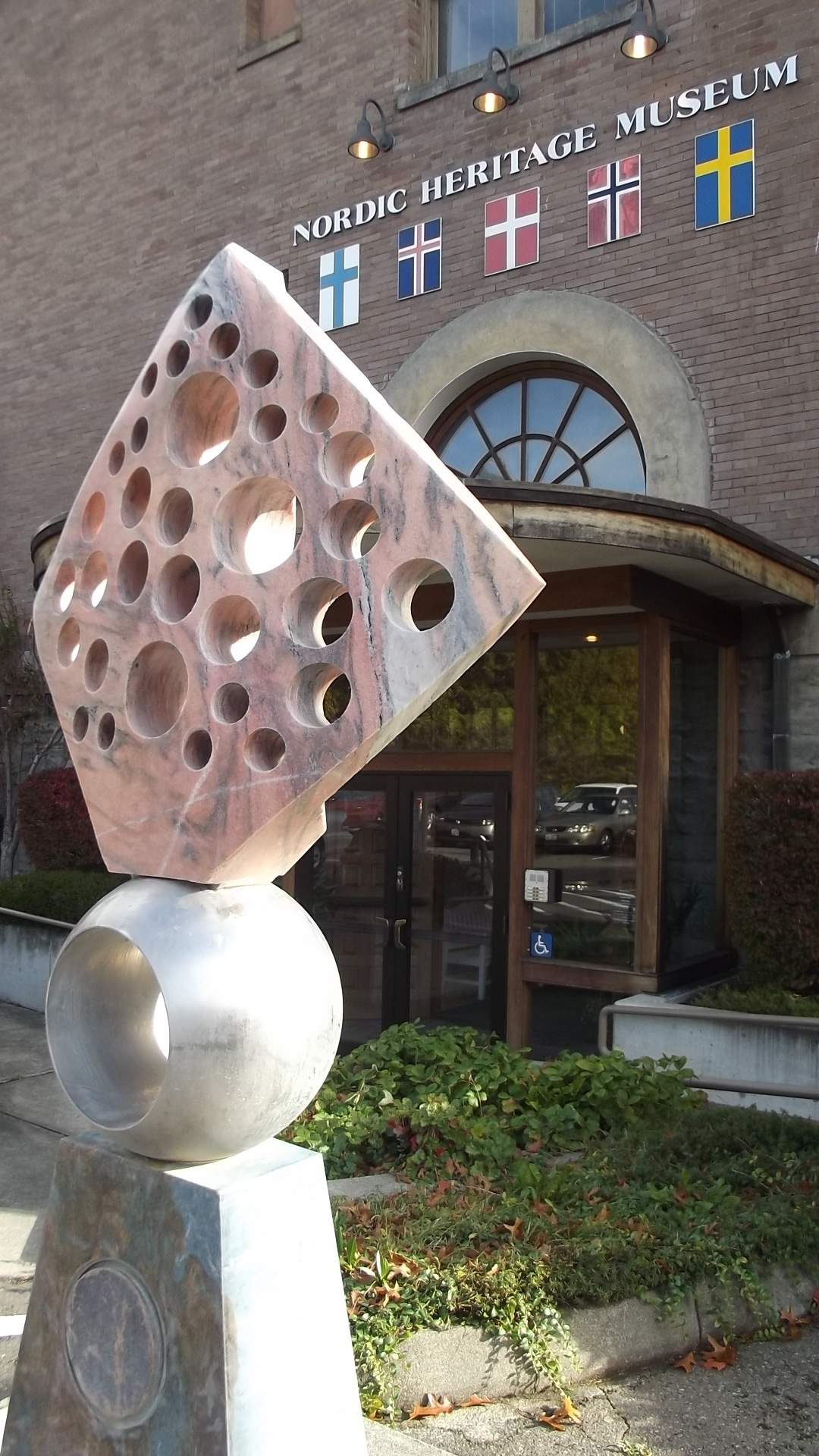
The entrance to the old Nordic Heritage Museum with a sculpture by Finnish artist Eino Romppanen, now closed and replaced by a relocated Nordic Museum

The National Nordic Museum (previously Nordic Heritage Museum and then Nordic Museum) is a museum in the Ballard neighborhood of Seattle, Washington, United States, dedicated to the Nordic history, art, culture, and the heritage of the area's Nordic immigrants. It was founded in 1980 as the Nordic Heritage Museum, moved into a permanent, purpose-built facility in 2018 named the Nordic Museum, and was designated as the National Nordic Museum in 2019. The museum serves as a community gathering place and shares Nordic culture by exhibiting art and objects, preserving collections, and providing educational and cultural experiences from Danish, Finnish, Icelandic, Norwegian and Swedish Americans. The geographical region covered by the Museum includes the entire Nordic region (Denmark, Finland, Iceland, Norway, Sweden, Estonia, the regions of the Faroe Islands, Greenland, and Åland, and the cultural region of Sápmi).

It has EIN 91-1107537 as a 501(c)(3) Public Charity; in 2024 it claimed total revenue of $5,865,407 and total assets of $47,889,472.

== Description ==
The museum was originally known as the 'Nordic Heritage Museum' and was located in a red brick building in a predominantly residential part of Ballard. This building had housed the Daniel Webster Elementary School from 1907 to 1979, at which time low student enrollment led to its closure. In 2018, the museum was renamed the 'Nordic Museum' and moved into a new 57,000-square-foot (5,300 m^{2}) building on NW Market Street in Ballard. This building, commissioned by the Museum, opened May 5, 2018, and was dedicated by Icelandic president Guðni Th. Jóhannesson and Danish crown princess Mary.

The non-profit museum's mission is to share "Nordic culture with people of all ages and backgrounds by exhibiting art and objects, preserving collections, providing educational and cultural experiences, and serving as a community gathering place." The founder and long-time director Marianne Forssblad retired in 2007. Eric Nelson followed her as executive director and Janet Rauscher became chief curator in 2008. In 2012, Lizette Gradén became the chief curator. In September 2019, Leslie Anne Anderson became director of collections, exhibitions, and programs. She oversees the curatorial department.

The museum published the NHM Historical Journal on a quarterly basis until 2011. In 2013 the museum published its first edition of the annual magazine Nordic Kultur.

The museum has also published books including Voices of Ballard and Beyond: Stories of Immigrants and Their Descendants in the Pacific Northwest published in 2012.

The Nordic Museum contains a Cultural Resource Center, that includes the Walter Johnson Memorial Library which was founded in 1980. As of 2011 it held 15500 books. It specializes in books published in Danish, Finnish, Icelandic, Norwegian, and Swedish. Its special collection includes the Gordon Tracie Music Collection and the Vanishing Generations Oral History Project. The Gordon Ekvall Tracie Music Collection (formerly the Gordon Ekvall Tracie Music Library) was founded in 1995. As of 2011 it contained 3000 audio/visual materials, 4000 music scores, 2500 books, and 40 periodical subscriptions. It focuses on folk customs, traditional dance, traditional music, folk art, and folk attire for Nordic cultures. Its special collections include the Gordon Ekvall Tracie Music Collection, the Nordiska Folkdancers Collection, and the Skandia Folkdance Society Collection.

The museum was designated as the National Nordic Museum in March 2019 by the U.S. Congress as part of the John D. Dingell Jr. Conservation, Management, and Recreation Act. The new name was dedicated by senators Maria Cantwell and Lisa Murkowski the following month.

== Exhibitions ==
=== Nordic Heritage Museum ===
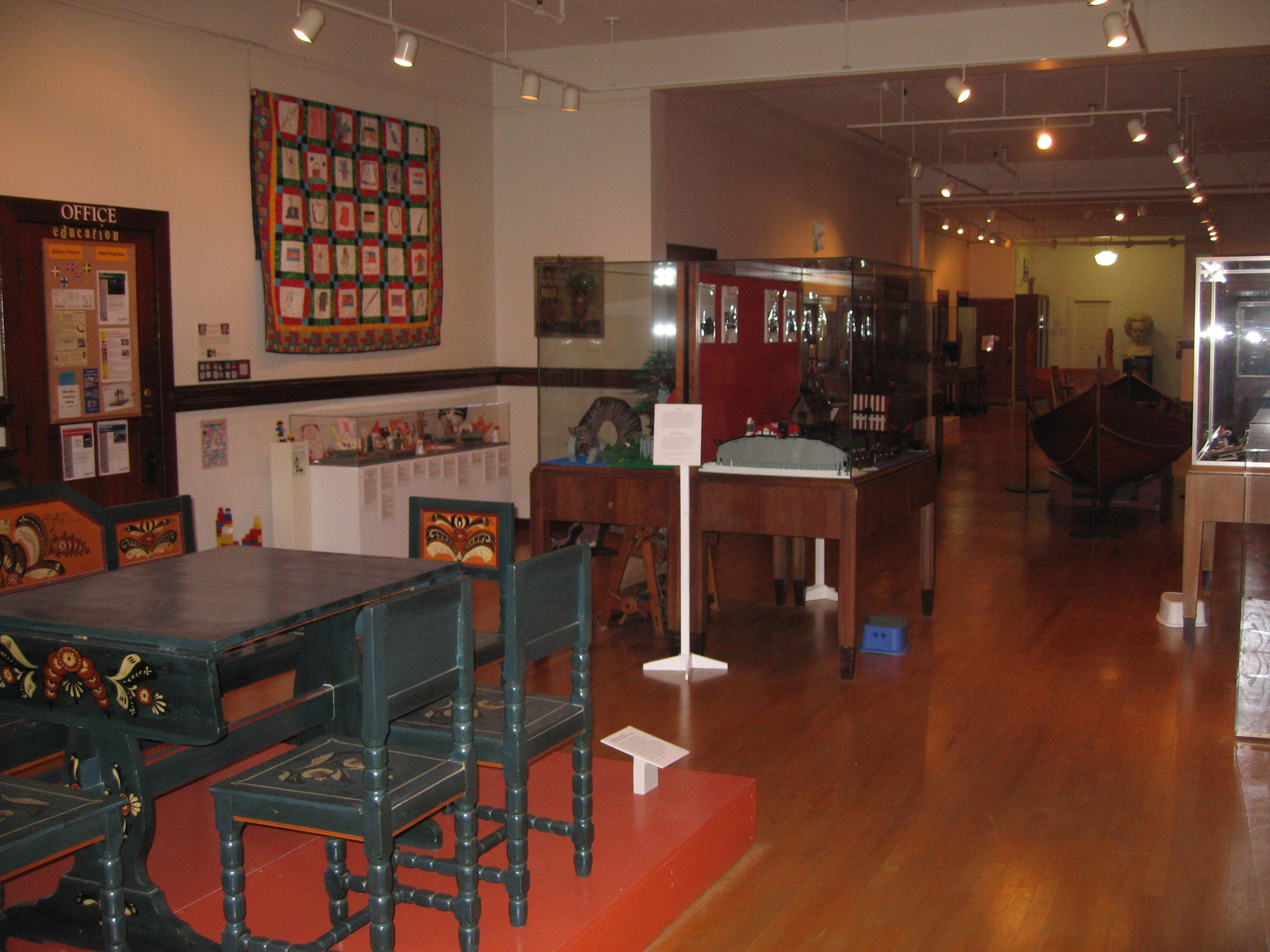
Exhibits at the old Nordic Heritage Museum

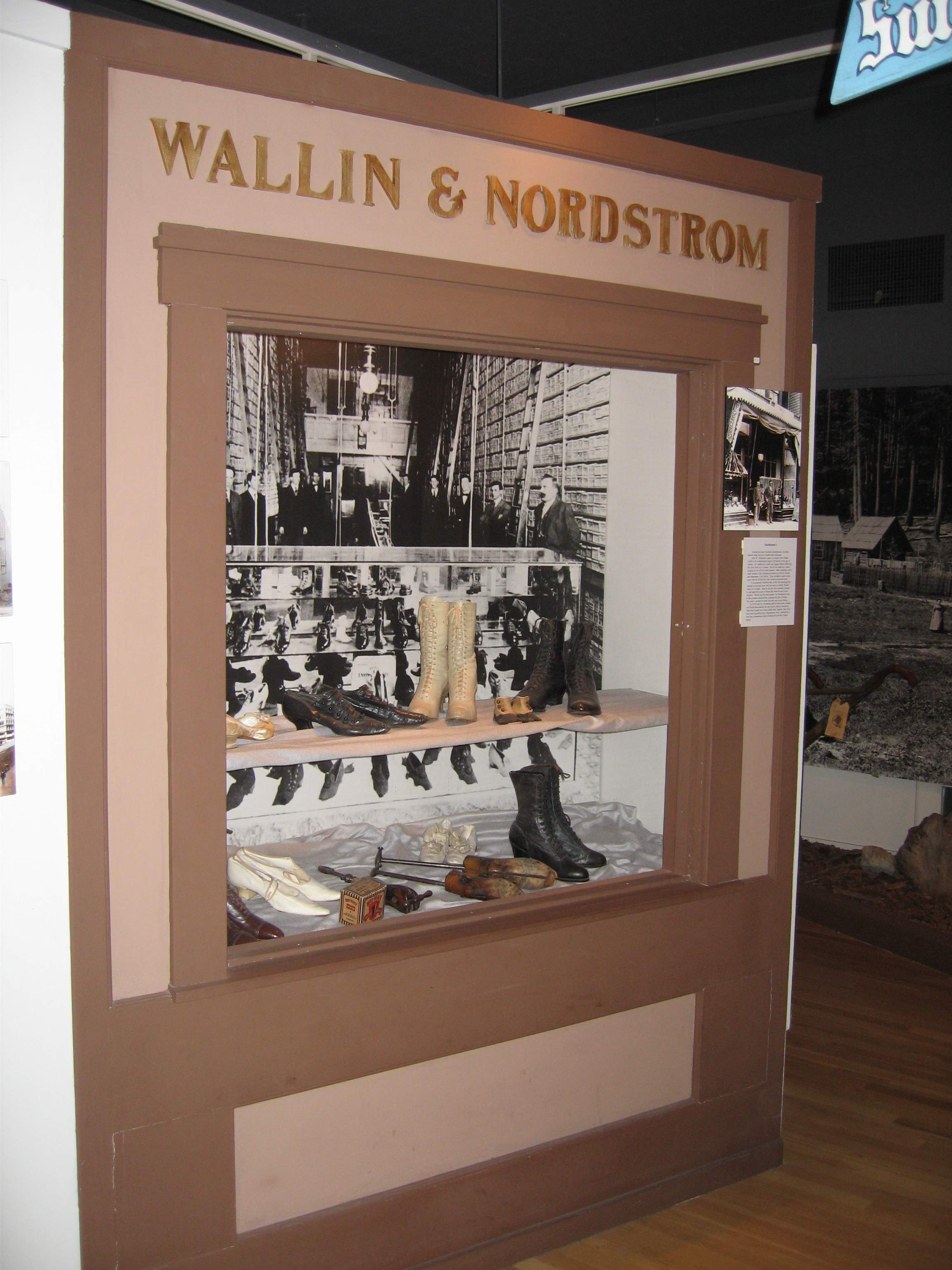
Exhibit from Sweden Room of the old Nordic Heritage Museum

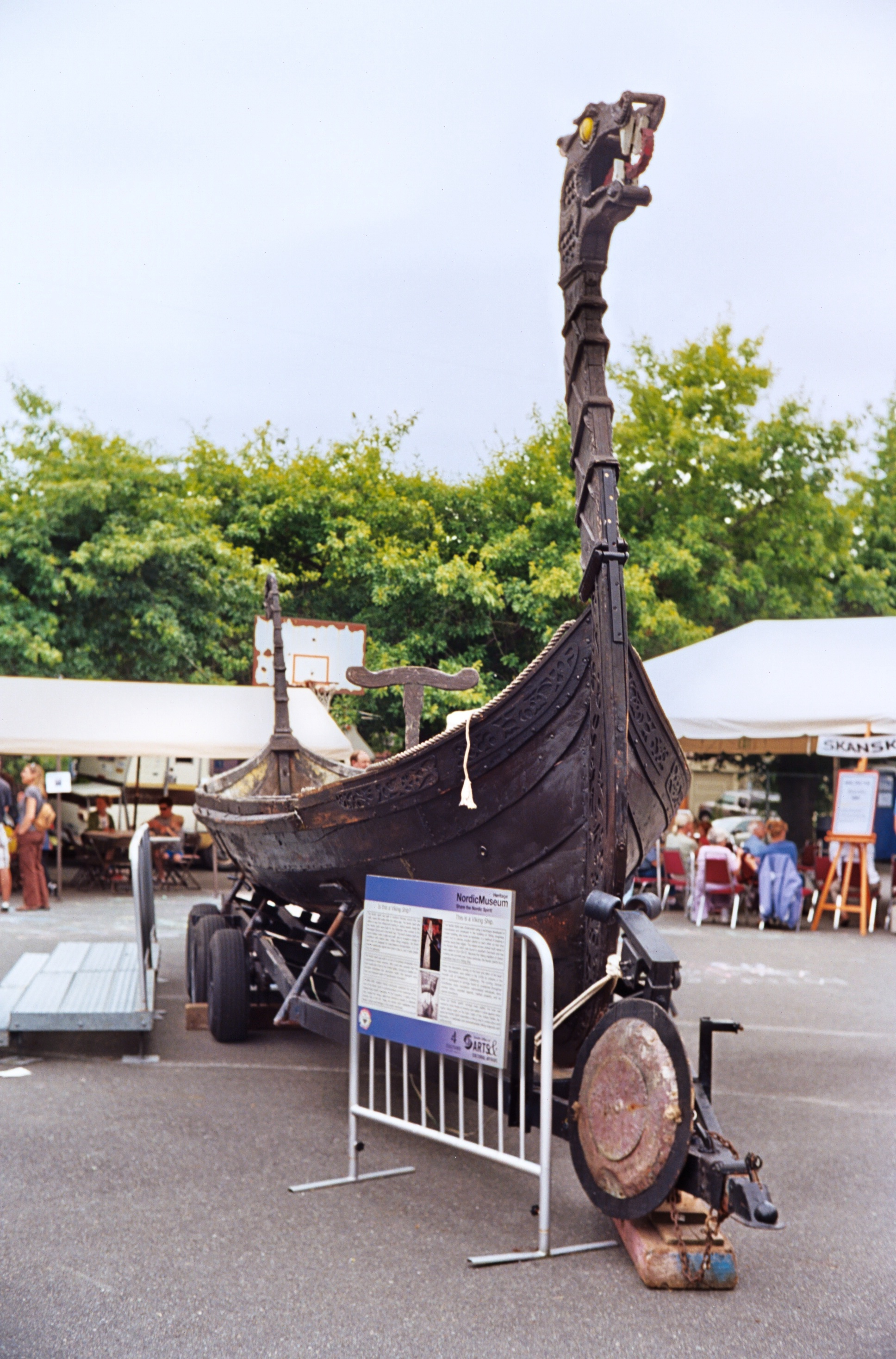
Viking ship at Viking Days 2012

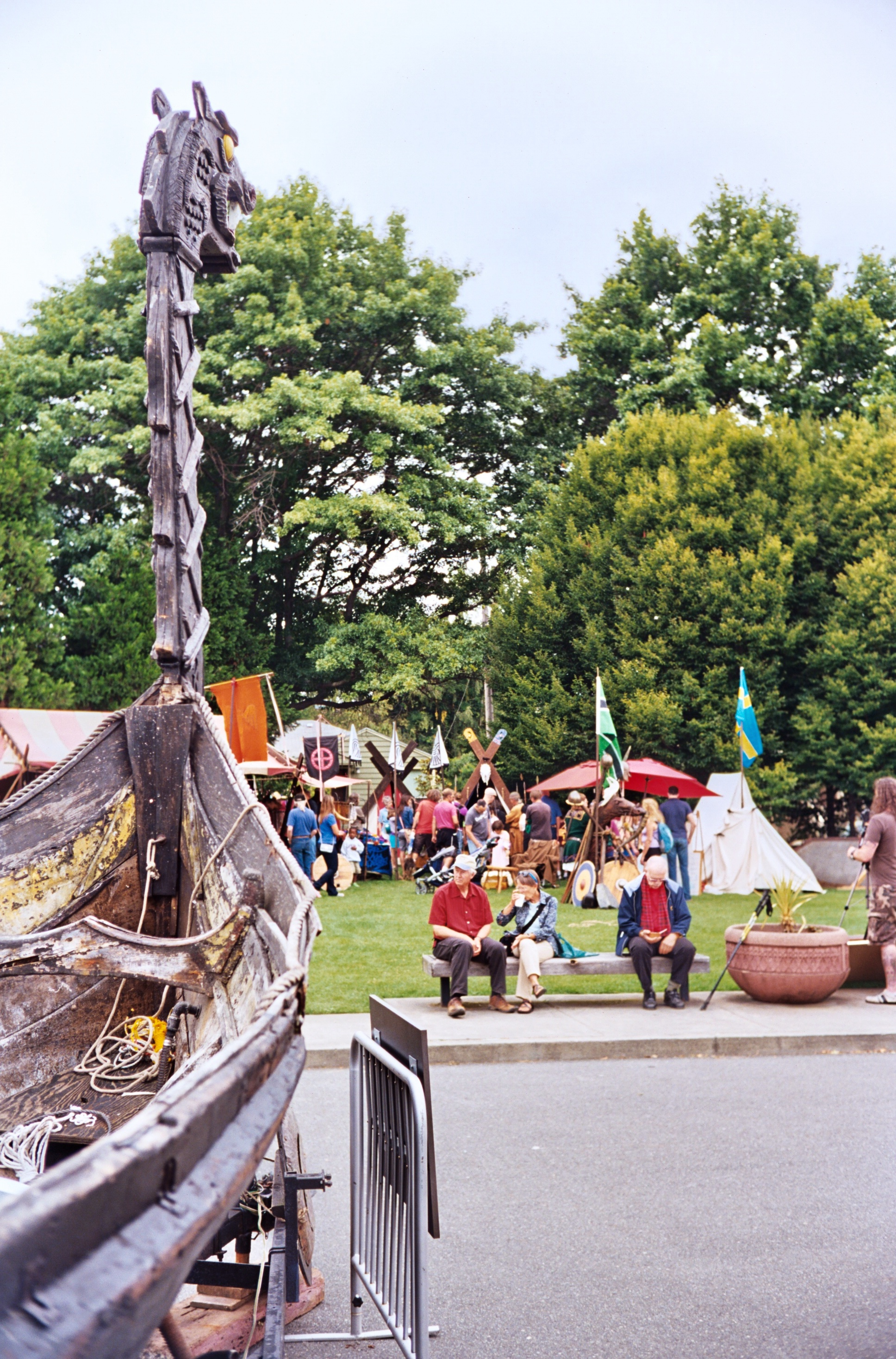
Ship and Viking encampment at Viking Days

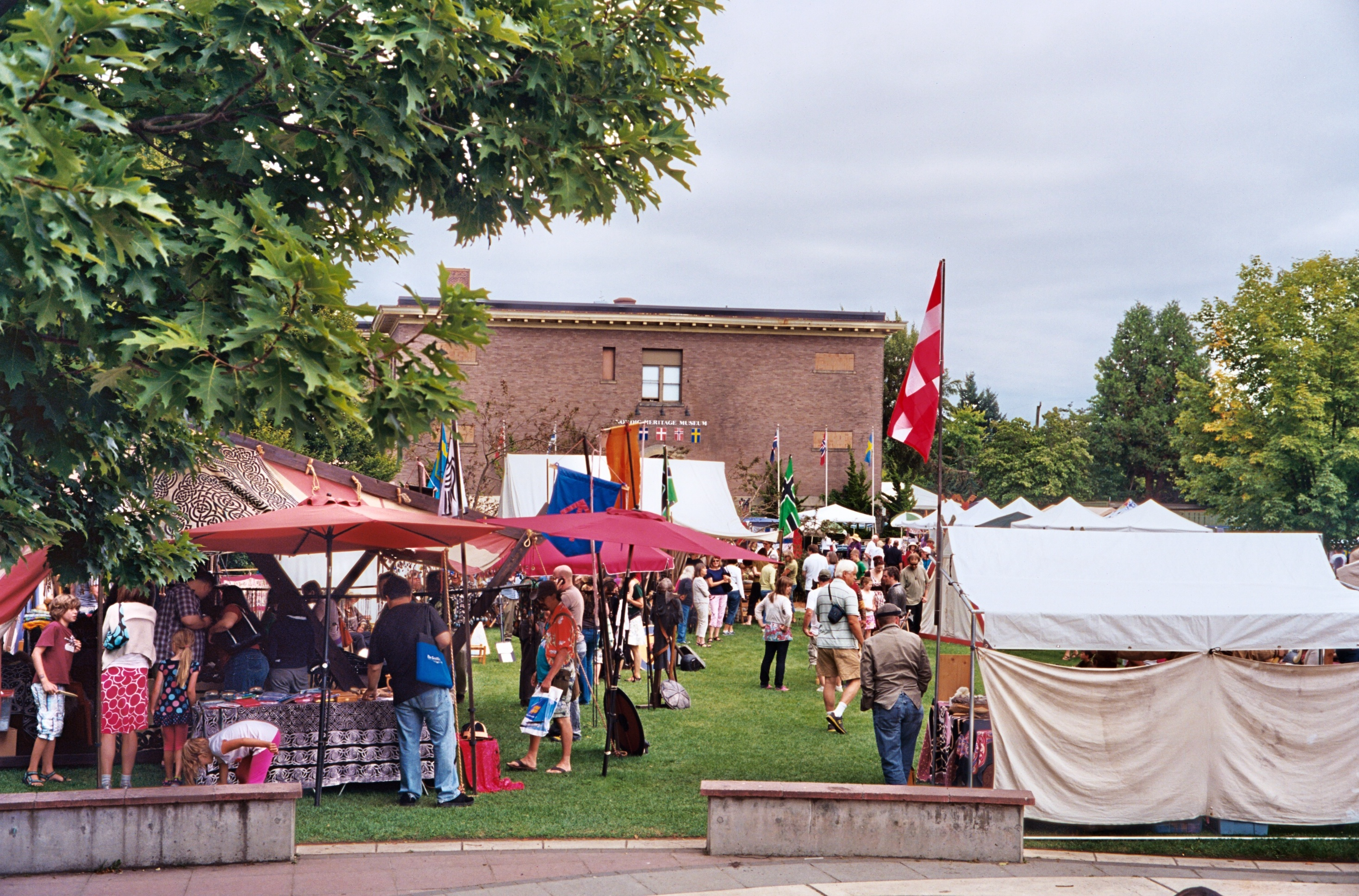
Craft and food vendors outside the previous museum building during Viking Days festival

As part of the long term exhibits, the old Nordic Heritage Museum had five ethnic galleries, one for each country, Denmark, Finland, Iceland, Norway and Sweden, as well a gallery, "Dream of America", describing Nordic emigration to the Pacific Northwest. There was also a temporary gallery space.

- Dream of America
- Folk Art Galleries
- Fishing Gallery
- Logging Gallery
- Iceland Room
- Norway Room
- Denmark Room
- Finland Room
- Sweden Room

=== National Nordic Museum ===
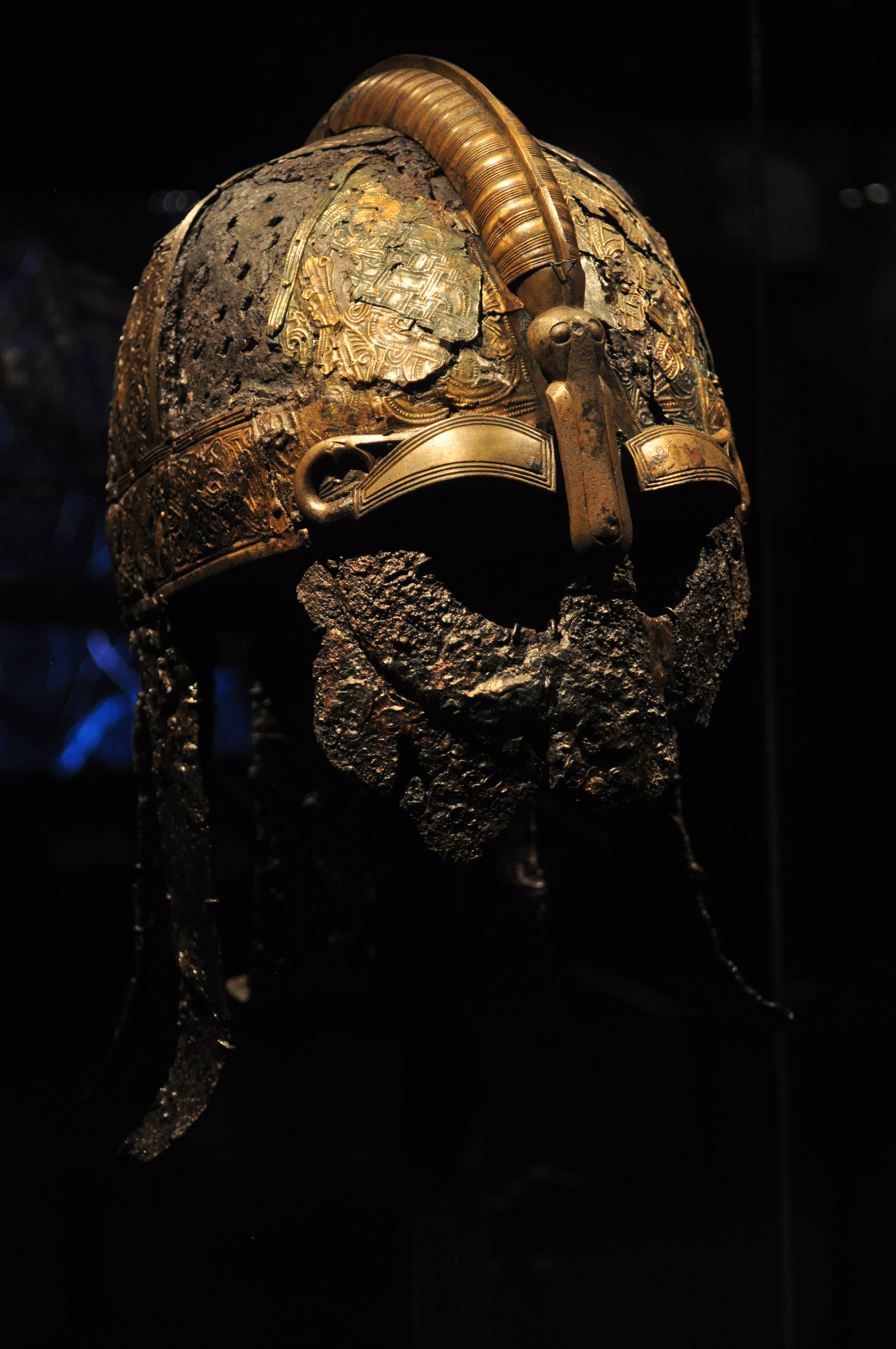
Warrior helmet, Valsgärde boat grave 5, 7th century. The Vikings Begin.

The permanent exhibit has been reconceived as a single exhibit, "Nordic Journeys", spread over five galleries. Besides artifacts from the museum's permanent collection, over 100 objects are on extended loan from other museums in the U.S. and national museums of the five Nordic countries. The exhibit ranges from 4,000-year-old stone axes and Viking-era artifacts to examples of modern Nordic design.

== Public programs ==
A large part of the museum's focus is offering programming to educate the public about Scandinavian culture, including a craft school, adult and kids programs and teacher resources.

- Folk School
  - Nordic Knitting Café
  - Nordic Woodcarving
  - Rosemaling
  - Nordic Cooking
- Adult Programs
  - Tours
  - Language Classes
  - Nordic American Voices
- Kids & Parents
  - Craft Projects
  - Kids' Corner
  - Music for Kids
- Teachers
  - Outreach Trunks
  - Nordic Adventures
  - Tour Materials

== Events ==
The museum holds frequent events that further its mission of creating a community gathering space and educating the public about Nordic culture and heritage, including:

- Concerts, such as the Mostly Nordic Chamber Music Series and Smörgåsbord (18th season in 2013)
- Films
- Lectures
- Exhibition openings and artist tours

== Special events ==
Each year the National Nordic Museum hosts two major community events, Nordic Sól and Julefest.

Nordic Sól began in 1984 as Tivoli Days and was held each July. In 2008 the two-day event's name was changed to Viking Days and in 2011 the event moved to mid-August. In 2018, the event moved back to July to coincide with the annual Ballard SeafoodFest. The event features food and craft vendors, Scandinavian music, and a Viking Encampment. In 2019, the museum renamed Viking Days to Nordic Sól and redesigned it to highlight more aspects of Nordic history and contemporary culture.

Julefest is held the Saturday and Sunday before Thanksgiving each year. This event is a Nordic Christmas celebration with craft vendors, Nordic food and music, and Christmas traditions on display. The 2019 Julefest was the 42nd occurrence of this festival.
