= Nordstjernan (newspaper) =

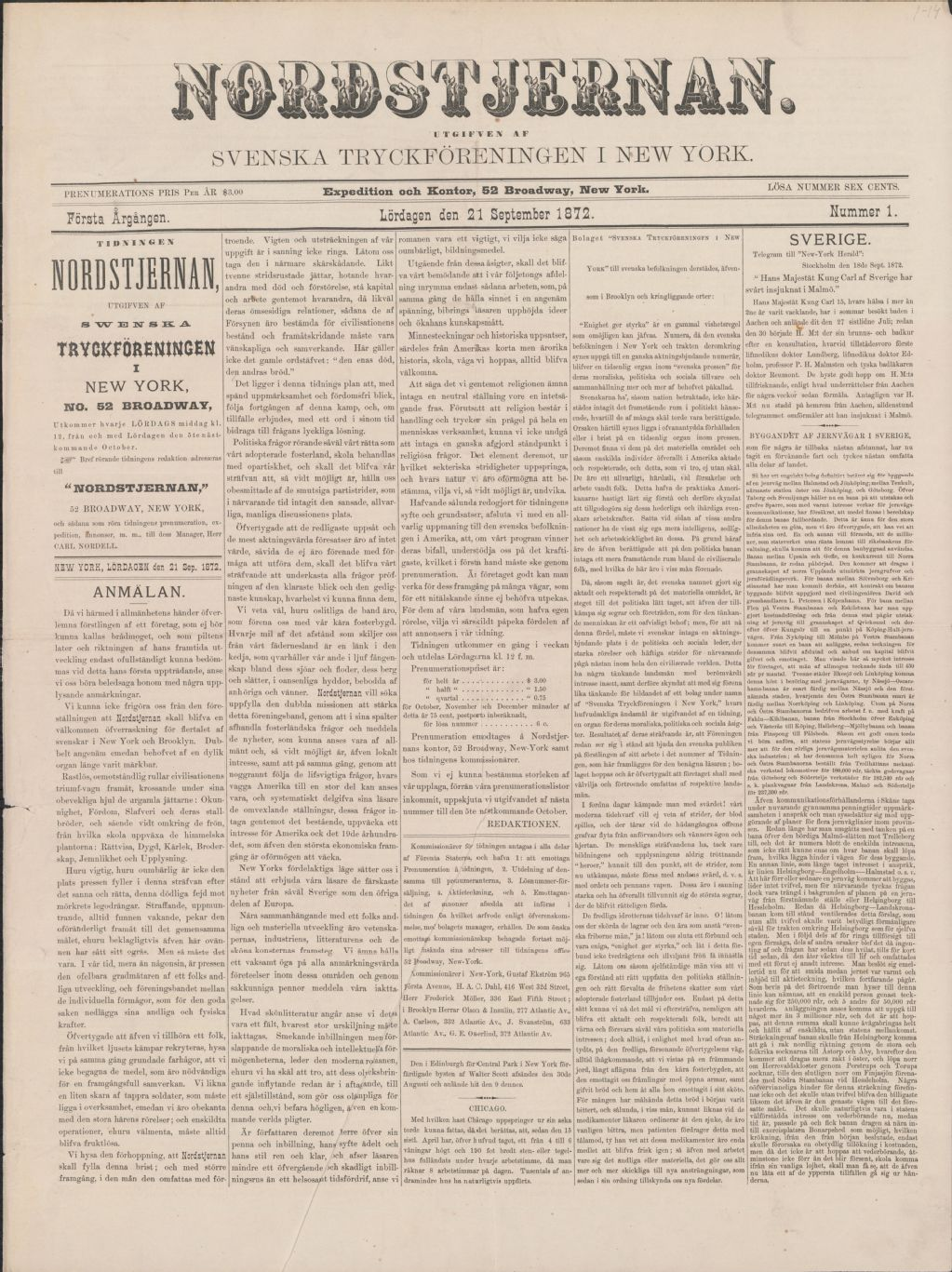
- First cover of Nordstjernan, Sept. 21, 1872
- Editor: Ulf Barslund Martensson
- Categories: Sweden, ethnic, travel, social issues, popular culture
- Frequency: 18 per year
- First issue: September 21, 1872
- Company: Swedish News, Inc.
- Country: United States
- Language: English and Swedish
- Website: nordstjernan.com
- ISSN: 1059-7670

Nordstjernan (in English The North Star), founded in 1872, is a mostly English-language newspaper for Swedish Americans and Swedish citizens in the United States. The publisher is Swedish News, Inc. of New York City.

== History ==
The first issue of America’s Swedish newspaper, Nordstjernan, appeared on newsstands on September 21, 1872, in the Manhattan district of the city of New York. When Nordstjernan published its first issue, Ulysses S. Grant (1822–1885), the victorious Union military commander from the American Civil War, was in the last weeks of campaigning for what would be his reelection to a second term as the 18th President of the United States (1869–1877). Since its foundation, it documented the links between Sweden and America but was initially created to supply the growing numbers of immigrants to the area with news from the old country. Svenska Tryckföreningen in New York City began publishing Nordstjernan. On newsstands each Saturday, at noon, it sold for six cents per copy, or three dollars per annual subscription, postage not included (later reduced to $2.00 per year and five cents per copy after protests from readers).

During the early days of Nordstjernan, the 1870s, stories in publications were composed by hand through movable type. Images were engraved by hand as mirror images into metal. Photoengraving arrived much later.

== Recent activities ==
Today Nordstjernan covers Swedish America from coast to coast. It contains news summaries, trends and columnists from Sweden but also covers traditions, trivia, seasonal recipes, and reports on Swedish community activities from all over the USA. Some of the organizations, such as the Swedish American Chamber of Commerce of San Francisco/Silicon Valley or the American Union of Swedish Singers appear in the newspaper on a regular, monthly basis. Others, such as the New Sweden Cultural Heritage Society or the American Swedish Historical Museum contribute regularly on people and early or later immigrant stories. While keeping up the Swedish-language tradition is still part of the newspaper's vision, content has increasingly been presented in English, expanding a trait present in the publication from its first issue. The newspaper, now published twice per month or biweekly, is 80% in English reflecting a readership divided between born Swedish Americans and expatriate Swedes.

In December, 2007, Nordstjernan merged with the similar publication Vestkusten in California. Published under the Nordstjernan name, the paper is printed at two locations simultaneously—outside New York and in northern California. Part of the newspaper and much of its online content are now user-generated through upload functions.

== See also ==
- List of Swedish-language newspapers

== Note ==
As of March 2009, this article is derived in whole or in part from nordstjernan.com. The copyright holder has licensed the content in a manner that permits reuse under CC BY-SA 3.0 and GFDL. All relevant terms must be followed. The original text was at "A History Going Back to 1872"

== Sources ==
- Benson, Hedin (1938) Swedes in America 1638-1938 (Yale University Press)
- Kastrup, Allan (1975) The Swedish Heritage in America (Swedish Council of America)
