= Gammelgården Museum of Scandia =

Museum in Scandia, Minnesota

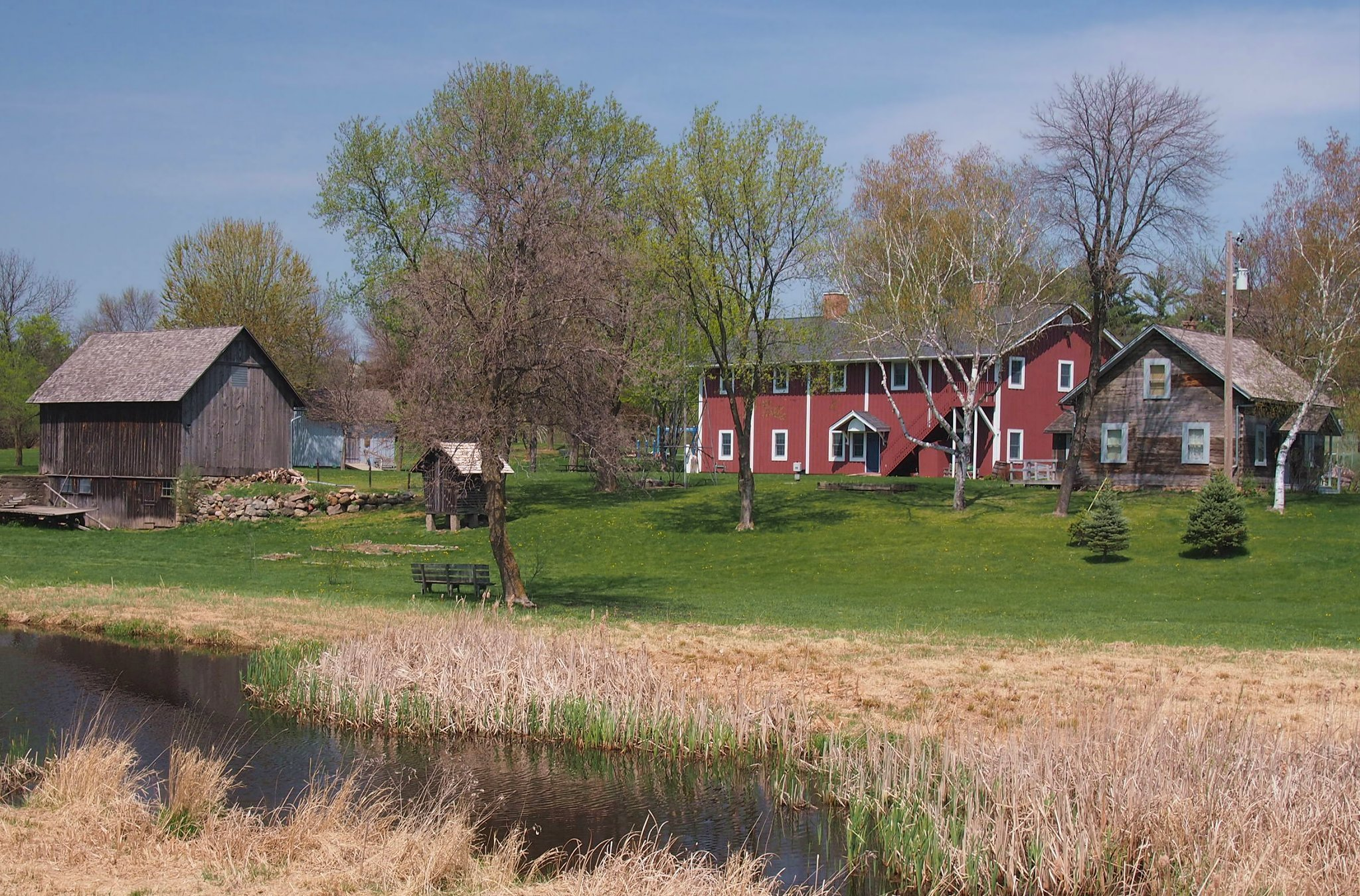
- Established: 1972
- Location: 20880 Olinda Trail North, Scandia, Minnesota, United States
- Coordinates: 45°15′06″N 92°48′29″W
- Type: Local history
- Executive director: Ann Rinkenberger
- Website: gammelgardenmuseum.org

Gammelgården Museum of Scandia is an open-air museum in Scandia, Minnesota, United States. It is devoted to Swedish immigration history. The museum's mission is to preserve, present, and promote Swedish immigrant heritage. The museum receives over 10,000 visitors each year.

== Museum ==
The museum site is on 11 acres (4.5 ha) of land and consists of five historic buildings and one contemporary building that are furnished with artifacts dating back to the 1850s. Two buildings, the Prästgård (Pastor's House) that was built in 1868 and the Ladugård (Barn) that was built in 1879, are original to the site. Three others, the oldest Lutheran church building in Minnesota (built in 1856), the Immigrant House, one the first homes in Scandia (built in 1855), the Stuga (built in 1930), were moved to the site. The site also features the Välkommen Hus (Welcome House or Visitor Center).

One-quarter of the approximately 10,000 visitors to the city's Swedish immigrant heritage museum and surrounding park annually travel from Sweden. This can be attributed, in large part, to "The Emigrants," a book series from the 1950s by Swedish journalist Vilhelm Moberg that depicts a Swedish family's journey to Chisago County. Lynne Blomstrand Moratzka, the former director of the Gammelgården Museum stated that Swedish tourists, "read those books and they figure it's their own family's story, so they want to see Minnesota."

== Programs ==
The museum offers guided tours that take visitors on a journey back in time to experience what immigrant life was like in the 1850s. Visitors can also explore the museum's exhibits on their own, which include artifacts, photographs, and documents that tell the story of Swedish immigration to Minnesota and their early life in the state.

The museum also offers a variety of educational programs and activities, including children's programs, seasonal celebrations, and group tours; and has a gift shop. Adjacent to the museum are picnic areas and a playground.

=== Luciadagen ===
The Luciadagen program at Gammelgården features a candlelit celebration in the Gammelkyrkan, the oldest Lutheran church building in Minnesota. This building also was used as a one-room schoolhouse and granary. The girl playing Lucia wears a white dress and a red sash, and wears a candle-lit crown on her head. St. Lucia Day, December 13, tradition marks the start of the Christmas season, connecting immigrants to their heritage and pre-immigrant life.

=== Naturalization Ceremonies ===
The museum also has held naturalization ceremonies for immigrants, with Scandia Elementary School students are welcomed to observe the ceremonies and lead everyone in reciting the Pledge of Allegiance.

== History ==
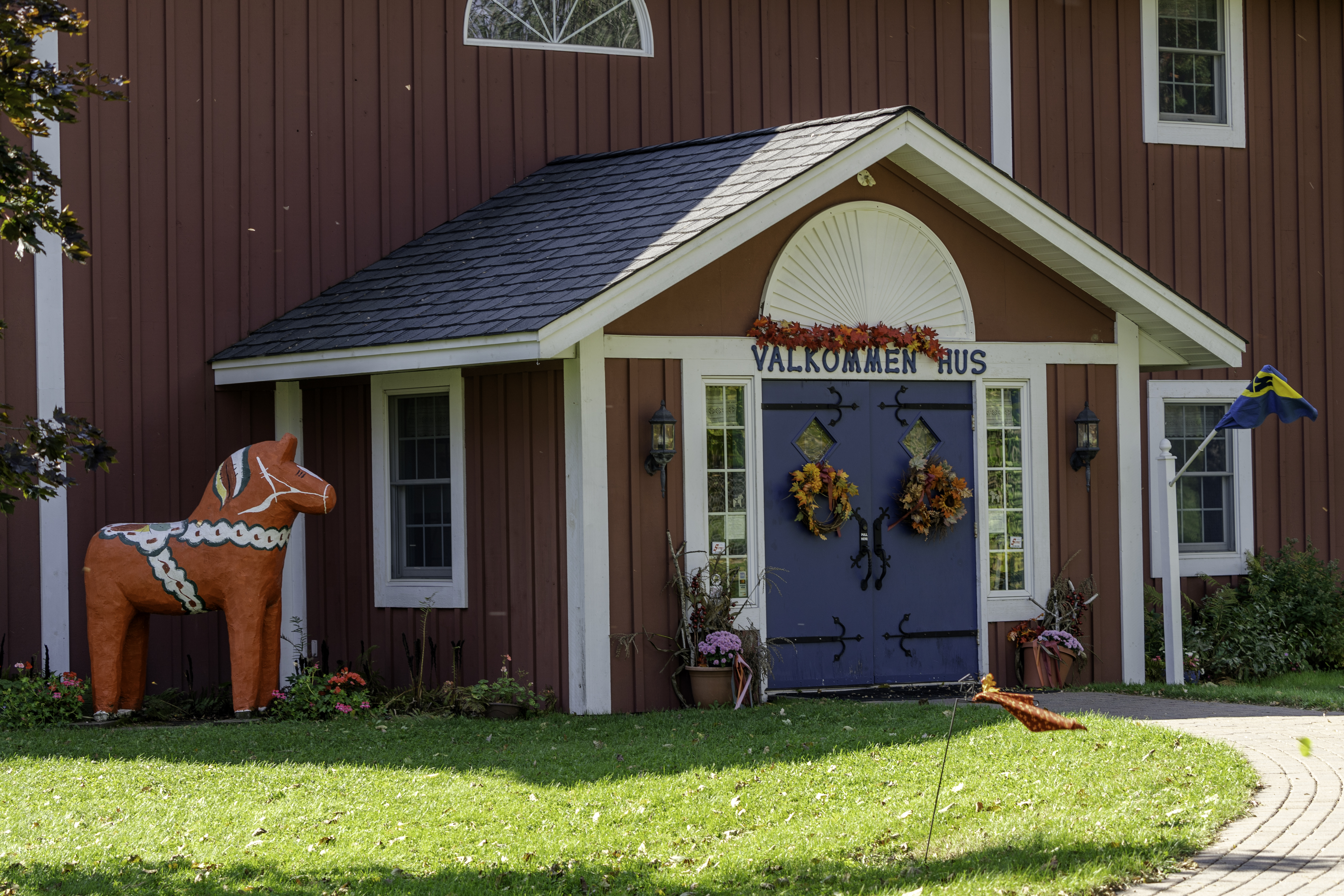
Välkommen Hus

The inception of the Gammelgården Museum of Scandia dates back to 1971 when the congregation of Elim Lutheran Church discovered the availability of its former pastor's house and barn from the 1850s. Recognized as the oldest Lutheran pastor's house in Minnesota, the church's 1856 log sanctuary, repurposed as a one-room school house and a hay barn, was also accessible for relocation and restoration on the 11-acre site.

In 1972, several members of the church came together to form a committee, leading to the establishment of Gammelgården, meaning "old farm" in Swedish. Over the years, additional buildings have been incorporated into the site, including a visitor center that was unveiled in 2002.

On October 6, 2012, the visiting King of Sweden, Carl XVI Gustaf presented his country's prestigious "Order of the Polar Star" on Lynne Moratzka, the then director of the Gammelgården Museum in honor of her contributions to Swedish-American culture and heritage during a ceremony at the American Swedish Institute of Minneapolis.

== See also ==
- List of museums in Minnesota
