= Jemtland, Maine =

Unincorporated community in Aroostook County, Maine

Jemtland
- Unincorporated community
- Interactive map of Jemtland
- Coordinates: 47°00′26″N 68°08′38″W
- Country: United States
- State: Maine
- County: Aroostook
- Town: New Sweden
- Settled: 1879
- Elevation: 778 ft (237 m)
- Time zone: UTC−5 (EST)
  - Summer (DST): UTC−4 (EDT)
- ZIP Code: 04762
- Area code: 207

Jemtland is an unincorporated village and historic Swedish settlement located along State Route 161 in Aroostook County, Maine, United States. The community is situated in the northern portion of the town of New Sweden, near the Stockholm town border.

== History ==
The settlement was established in 1879 when Swedish immigrants, including early pioneer Jons Sodergren, moved north from the main New Sweden colony center into the wooded frontier lots along what became Jemtland Road. It is named after the province of Jämtland in northwestern Sweden, from which many of its original homesteaders emigrated.

Following the expansion of the Bangor and Aroostook Railroad through the area in the late 1890s, Jemtland grew into a distinct agricultural community featuring its own neighborhood school district, rail siding, and local businesses.
