= Consulate General of Sweden, Los Angeles =

Diplomatic mission of Sweden in Los Angeles

- Location: Los Angeles
- Address: 10940 Wilshire Blvd, Los Angeles, CA 90024, USA (Note: When the consulate general closed in 2009, it was located at 10940 Wilshire Boulevard, Suite 700. On October 20, 2021, Sweden opened an honorary consulate located at 11766 Wilshire Boulevard, Suite 270.)
- Coordinates: 34.04805°N 118.46217°W
- Opening: 1980 (Note: The career consulate general officially opened in 1980 but traces its origins to the honorary vice consulate established in 1910. The consulate general was also closed between 1995 and 1998.)
- Closed: December 31, 2009 (Note: The consulate general was first closed on June 30, 1995, but reopened three years later and closed for the second and last time on December 31, 2009.)
- Jurisdiction: Consular district below

The Consulate General of Sweden, Los Angeles was the diplomatic mission of Sweden in Los Angeles between 1980 and 1995, as well as between 1998 and 2009. The consulate general had its origins in the honorary vice consulate opened in 1910, which was transformed into an honorary consulate in 1955 and an honorary consulate general in 1969. The main tasks of the consulate general were to disseminate information about Sweden and Swedish collaboration opportunities, promote business activities through various events, and handle consular matters (primarily passport and visa processing) and assistance to Swedish citizens in the western United States.

Initially, its consular district only covered the city of Los Angeles, but over time it expanded to include up to 13 states as other Swedish consulates general in the United States closed. The Swedish consulate general in Los Angeles closed for the second time in 2009. In 2021, Sweden reopened an honorary consulate in Los Angeles to, among other things, support Swedish citizens in southern California with consular matters.

== History ==
=== 1910–1995 ===
The Consulate General of Sweden in Los Angeles originated from the honorary vice consulate opened in 1910 in Los Angeles, which was under the jurisdiction of the Swedish consulate (later the consulate general) in San Francisco. In April of the same year, the Swedish Minister of Foreign Affairs appointed Milton Carlson as vice consul in Los Angeles, under the consulate in San Francisco. In June 1954, the National Swedish Board of Trade recommended that the honorary vice consulate in Los Angeles be transformed into an honorary consulate. In August of the following year, the vice consulate was elevated to a consulate. On April 24, 1969, the honorary consulate was elevated to an honorary consulate general. The honorary consulate in Los Angeles was for several years under the authority of the Swedish consulate general in San Francisco, whose head was a salaried career diplomat appointed by the Ministry for Foreign Affairs in Stockholm. After about four decades, roles were reversed. In 1980, Los Angeles became the seat for a career diplomat, and San Francisco was downgraded to a regular consulate two years later.

In 1979, when the honorary consulate general in Los Angeles was planned to be transformed into a consulate general, the Ullsten cabinet appointed Harry Schein, former CEO of the Swedish Film Institute, as the new consul general in Los Angeles. Personnel from the Ministry for Foreign Affairs protested to Prime Minister Ullsten against the planned appointment, arguing that the Ministry for Foreign Affairs should not be a haven for ousted politicians and exhausted officials. Since September 1976, 45 percent of senior appointments had been made outside the foreign service. Foreign Minister Hans Blix insisted on the intention to appoint Schein as consul general, stating that Schein had specific expertise in media and business, which would be valuable for a consul general in Los Angeles.

The Ministry for Foreign Affairs' staff association (UPF) argued that Schein was highly unsuitable as consul general. Despite protests, Schein was appointed as the new consul general in Los Angeles from November 1, 1979. In early November 1979, Schein resigned from the position before he had settled into the role. Schein was reported to be tired of union criticism against him, tired of media writings, and tired of the Ministry for Foreign Affairs' "submission". In his place, career diplomat Olle Tunberg was appointed as the new consul general in January 1980.

In August 1984, it was reported that, on the advice of the Chief of the Beverly Hills Police Department, the consulate general replaced its alarm systems with a guard dog. The German Shepherd named Orita had been exported from the National Swedish Dog Training Centre (Statens hundskola) in Sollefteå to the consulate general in Los Angeles and was specially trained to identify terrorists and other unwelcome guests.

On July 1, 1992, the Swedish Information Service in San Francisco which was located at the Honorary Consulate General of Sweden was integrated with the Swedish Consulate General in Los Angeles.

=== First closure (1995) ===
In the beginning of 1995, it was reported that the Ministry for Foreign Affairs had reduced budgets, and 11 percent was to be saved until 1998. By then, 15 foreign missions were to be closed, and among the ones threatened in 1995/96 was the consulate general in Los Angeles. Ultimately, the Los Angeles consulate had become too costly. It was estimated that the consulate cost SEK 13,000,000 per year. Personnel and housing costs were deemed excessively high. The chancery on Wilshire Boulevard and the residence on Foothill Avenue paid a combined rent of about $25,000 per month. Salaries for the approximately dozen staff members amounted to at least triple that amount. "Entertainment" and other expenses made up the rest of the costs. Demonstrations against the closure took place outside the consulate building on Wilshire Boulevard. Ambassador Henrik Liljegren came from Washington, D.C. and spoke to the protesters, who carried signs, attracting attention. The ambassador "sympathized" with the demonstrators but couldn't do anything about it. Virtually all Swedish organizations in Los Angeles opposed the closure. It was generally believed that it would harm Swedish interests both "at home" and "abroad." The Swedish Chamber of Commerce in Los Angeles felt this particularly strongly.

The fundamental question at the Ministry for Foreign Affairs was whether it was right for a country like Sweden not to be represented on the West Coast of the United States. An internal investigation suggested, among other things, transforming Los Angeles into an honorary consulate and selling the house on 600 Park Avenue in New York City. The Swedish presence in the United States had dramatically shrunk over the past decade. Two years prior, the Consulate General of Sweden, Chicago had been closed. The proposed cuts meant that operations would be reduced by an additional 20 percent compared to the overall savings target of 11 percent. The Ministry for Foreign Affairs was to save 185 million kronor over the next three budget years, a decision made by the parliament in March 1995, and the savings meant that 15 Swedish embassies and consulates were to be closed by 1998. In February 1995, the Carlsson III cabinet decided to close the consulate general in Los Angeles by the mid-year. The Moderate Party believed that the consulate general should remain open since it was the only mission left on the economically expanding U.S. West Coast.

=== Re-opening (1998) ===
The consulate general in Los Angeles was closed on June 30, 1995, after the parliament had tasked the Ministry for Foreign Affairs with saving 185 million kronor over three years. Two years later, the decision was made to reopen the consulate general. The new consulate general would focus on trade and the economy. The new consulate general had a budget of $460,000 and was funded not by the Ministry for Foreign Affairs, but rather by funds earmarked to promote Sweden's economic growth.

On March 26, 1998, the new Swedish consulate general was inaugurated. The new consulate general would have an entirely new focus with the explicit purpose of promoting Swedish export and industrial interests. The work that was previously carried out by the Swedish Trade Council, the Swedish Technical Attaché System (Sveriges Tekniska Attachéer), Invest in Sweden, and the Swedish Tourist Council (Turistrådet), scattered in various locations, was now consolidated under one umbrella, known as "Swedish Offices".

=== Second closure (2009) ===
In 2009, the Ministry for Foreign Affairs introduced a new cost-saving plan, aiming to close the consulate general in Los Angeles and the Consulate General of Sweden, New York City. The closure of the consulate general in Los Angeles was to be completed by December 31, 2009. The Embassy of Sweden, Washington, D.C. became the supervisory authority for the nine honorary consulates that were previously under the jurisdiction of the consulate general in Los Angeles.

Sweden opened an honorary consulate in Los Angeles, California on October 20, 2021.

== Tasks ==
The primary tasks of the consulate general included spreading information about Sweden and collaboration opportunities, promoting business activities through the organization of various events, handling consular matters (mainly passport and visa processing), and providing assistance to Swedish citizens in the western United States. The consulate general focused on promoting industries such as biotechnology, IT, environmental technology, and the creative industries (film, music, and design). Close collaboration occurred with organizations like the Swedish Trade Council, Invest in Sweden Agency (ISA), the Swedish Institute For Growth Policy (Institutet för tillväxtpolitiska studier, ITPS), and the Swedish-American Chamber of Commerce (SACC).

== District ==
The consular district has changed over the years as other Swedish consulates general have closed or been downgraded. Between 1977 and 1978, the district covered the City of Los Angeles and Los Angeles County.

From 1979 to 1980, the consulate general was responsible for the City of Los Angeles and the counties of San Luis Obispo, Kern, Santa Barbara, Los Angeles, Ventura, San Bernardino, Orange, Riverside, Imperial, and San Diego.

Starting in 1981, it expanded to include the states of Arizona and Hawaii. After the Swedish consulate general in San Francisco was downgraded to a consulate in 1982, the Los Angeles consulate general took over the entire state of California — except for the city of San Francisco and the counties of San Mateo, Santa Clara, Alameda, Contra Costa, Solano, Napa, Sonoma, and Marin — as well as the states of Alaska, Arizona, Hawaii, Idaho, Nevada, Oregon, Utah, and Washington. By 1984, the consulate in San Francisco had closed and been transformed into an honorary consulate. The consulate general in Los Angeles then covered the entire state of California and the states of Alaska, Arizona, Hawaii, Idaho, Nevada, Oregon, Utah, and Washington until 1989.

In 1989, the Swedish consulate general in Minneapolis closed, and from 1990, the consulate general in Los Angeles also included the states of Colorado, Montana, New Mexico, and Wyoming. This district remained the same until the closure of the consulate general in Los Angeles in 1995.

== Buildings ==
=== Chancery ===
From at least 1961 to 1971, the chancery was located in Suite 803 of the Wilflower Building at 615 South Flower Street in the Financial District of Los Angeles. From 1972 to 1977, it was situated in Suite 402 at the same address. Between 1978 and 1984, the consulate general was located in Suite 304 at 10960 Wilshire Boulevard in Westwood. From 1985 to 1992, it was a few hundred meters away at 10880 Wilshire Boulevard, Suite 505. From 1993 to 1995, it was situated at 10990 Wilshire Boulevard, Suite 1100. When the consulate general was re-established in 1998, it was once again located at 10960 Wilshire Boulevard, Suite 820, until 1999. From 2000 until the consulate general closed in 2009, it was situated at 10940 Wilshire Boulevard, Suite 700. Since 2021, the honorary consulate is located at 11766 Wilshire Boulevard, Suite 270 in West Los Angeles.

=== Residence ===
The residence was located on Foothill Avenue. In 1983, it was reported that the annual rent for the residence in Los Angeles amounted to 632,000 SEK.

== Heads of Mission ==
Name	Period	Title	Notes	Ref
Milton Carlson	1910–1912	Honorary vice consul		
Gottlieb Eckdahl	1912–1925	Honorary vice consul		
William Andrew Montén	1925–1929	Honorary vice consul		
–	1930–1931	–	Vacant	
Gustaf Wilhelm Olson	1931–1932	Honorary vice consul		
Nicanor Engblom	1932–1937	Honorary vice consul		
Walter G. Danielson	1937–1955	Honorary vice consul		
Walter G. Danielson	1955–1969	Honorary consul		
Walter G. Danielson	April 24, 1969 – 1976	Honorary consul general		
Lars Carlson	1966–1969	Vice consul	Career diplomat. Acting 1965–1966.	
Lars Carlson	1969–1974	Consul	Career diplomat	
Karl-Erik Andersson	1974–1975	Consul	Career diplomat	
Gunnar-Axel Dahlström	1975–1979	Consul	Career diplomat	
Olle Tunberg	1980 – June 11, 1982	Consul general	Died in office.	
Margareta Hegardt	1983–1989	Consul general		
Peter Hammarström	1989–1994	Consul general		
Nils Rosenberg	1994–1995	Consul general		
Barbro Sachs-Osher	1995–1997	Honorary consul general		
Andreas Ekman	1998–2003	Consul general		
Tomas Rosander	2003–2007	Consul general		
Nina Ersman	2007–2009	Consul general		
Gudrun Giddings	2021–present	Honorary consul		

== See also ==
- Consulate General of Sweden, Chicago
- Consulate General of Sweden, Houston
- Consulate General of Sweden, Minneapolis
- Consulate General of Sweden, New York City
- Consulate General of Sweden, San Francisco
