= Kwieciński =

Kwieciński (feminine: Kwiecińska, plural: Kwiecińscy) is a Polish surname. It may refer to:

- Andrzej Kwieciński (born 1984), Polish composer
- Czesław Kwieciński (born 1943), Polish wrestler
- Grant Kwiecinski (born 1990), American musician
- Ireneusz Kwieciński (born 1974), Polish judoka
- Rafał Kwieciński (born 1975), Polish footballer
- Włodzimierz Kwieciński (born 1955), Polish karateka

== See also ==
- Mikhail Kvetsinsky also known as Michael (von) Kwetzinsky (1866–1923), Russian officer and a military administrator
