= Richard Wood =

Richard Wood may refer to:

- Richard Wood (Welsh politician) (died 1682), Welsh politician who sat in the House of Commons, 1646–1648
- Sir Richard Wood (consul) (1806–1900), British consul in Damascus and Tunis
- Richard Wood (Australian politician) (1839–1923), member of the South Australian House of Assembly, 1893–1902
- Richard Wood (bishop) (1920–2008), British Anglican bishop and anti-apartheid campaigner
- Richard Wood, Baron Holderness (1920–2002), British Conservative politician
- Dick Wood (1936–2015), American football quarterback
- Richard J. Wood, Canadian mathematician
- Richard Wood (American football) (born 1953), retired National Football League linebacker
- Richard Wood (molecular biologist) (born 1955), American molecular biologist
- Richard Wood (diplomat) (born 1967), British Ambassador to Norway
- Richard Wood (footballer) (born 1985), English footballer for Rotherham United F.C.

== See also ==
- Richard Woods (disambiguation)
