= Order of the Scottish Samurai =

Award established in 1994

- Coat of Arms of the Order of the Scottish Samurai
- Established: 1994
- Status: Currently constituted
- Grades: Great Taisho; Hatamoto Taisho; Taisho; Great Shogun; Shogun; Legendary Samurai; Samurai; Cadet Samurai

The Order of the Scottish Samurai (OSS), is an award "recognising excellence, character and respect in alignment with the ancient spirit of budo." It was founded in 1994 by Ronnie Watt, and based on the Order of the Rising Sun, awarded in 1908 to Thomas Blake Glover, 'The Scottish Samurai'.

== Origins ==
The OSS was established in 1994 by Aberdeen-based martial arts expert Ronnie Watt, as an awarding body which recognises "excellence, character and respect in alignment with the ancient spirit of budo." The order is modelled on the Order of the Rising Sun which in 1908 bestowed an award on merchant Thomas Blake Glover, who was born in Fraserburgh in 1838 and who rose to be one of the founding fathers of industrialisation in Japan.

== About the awards ==
The awards which honour ties between Scotland and Japan, recognise individuals who excel in their chosen field or who demonstrate particular character and distinction. There are two levels of award: Samurai and Shogun. The latter award denotes a higher level of achievement or recognition. Recipients are nominated each year by current award-holders.

"The OSS became an awarding body and friendship society in 2016, with letters patent from the Lord Lyon" according to an article on Aberdeen University's website.

Awards are normally conferred at Broomhall House, home of Lord Charles Edward Bruce, 12th Earl of Elgin or at The Gordon Highlanders Museum in Aberdeen.

Recipient, Charlie Abel, a noted composer and performer of Scottish Music, created a new tune "The March O' The Scottish Samurai" to commemorate the award.

== Grades or Ranks of Award ==
Those admitted to the order are awarded ranks, and are permitted to use the post-nominal letters OSS followed by rank in Japanese characters.

Rank	Post-nominal letters
Great Taisho, Hatamoto Taisho, Taisho	OSS 大正
Great Shogun	OSS 大将軍
Shogun	OSS 将軍
Legendary Samurai	OSS 伝説の侍
Samurai	OSS

== Nomination Process ==
In the Order of the Scottish Samurai Armorial Register, the author Albert Adams Thomson describes the nomination process for the award. Any member, society patron or board member can nominate an individual for an award. A nomination, along with the potential recipient's CV, is forwarded to the general secretary for the Board's approval. This is required before shortlisting and consideration by the Approving Panel of the Society. The panel is comprised the OSS head and at least two other board members. The nominee may be required to attend with the panel or their representatives.

== Notable award holders ==
Notable OSS award holders include the following list.

=== Individuals ===
- Billy Connolly
- Alex Salmond
- Joanna Lumley
- Joseph Morrow, Lord Lyon King of Arms
- Lord Charles Edward Bruce
- Sir Ian Wood
- Shinzo Abe
- Natsu Yamaguchi
- Lord Elgin
- Chay Blyth
- Paul Mealor
- Tomihisa Taue
- Sean Michael Wilson
- Professor George Boyne
- Martin Gilbert
- George Kerr
- George Adam, Great Shogun, former Lord Provost of Aberdeen
- Dr. Margaret Smith, Shogun, former Lord Provost of Aberdeen
- Margaret Farquhar CBE, Shogun, former Lord Provost of Aberdeen
- Barney Crockett, Great Shogun, former Lord Provost of Aberdeen
- John Reynolds, Legendary Samurai, former Lord Provost of Aberdeen

=== Institutions ===
- Aberdeen
- The University of Aberdeen
