= Richard Woods =

Richard Woods may refer to:

- Richard Woods (diplomat) (born 1941), New Zealand diplomat and public servant
- Richard Woods (politician), American politician, Georgia Superintendent of Schools

== See also ==
- Richard Wood (disambiguation)
