= Business Sweden =

Business Sweden, also known as the Swedish Trade and Invest Council, is a not-for-profit, strategy consultancy with a purpose to help Swedish companies grow their global sales and international companies to invest and expand in to Sweden. .The organisation has two owners: The Government of Sweden and the private business sector in Sweden. The government is represented by the Ministry for Foreign Affairs and the business sector by the Swedish Foreign Trade Association (Swedish: Sveriges Allmänna Utrikeshandelsförening). The CEO of Business Sweden is Jan Larsson.

== About Business Sweden ==
Business Sweden was founded on 1 January 2013 through a merger of the Swedish Trade Council. and Invest Sweden.

Business Sweden has 44 offices in four regions: Europe, the Americas, Asia Pacific, and the Middle East and Africa. Its headquarters is located in Stockholm. Most of its more than 500 employees work in the international offices and in close cooperation with Swedish embassies and consulates. As such, the organisation is an important partner and flagbearer for Sweden and Swedish companies, and has a unique mandate to engage with both the public and private sector.

Business Sweden's international offices provide advisory services primarily focusing on Go-To-Market strategies and market analysis. The organization has a matrix structure focusing on either industry or functional expertise, where consultants are exposed to key industry verticals such as Automotive, Energy and Industrials and where the other verticals such as Life Sciences and Consumer Goods vary from market to market.

Clients range from startups to small and medium sized businesses to multinational enterprises – with tailor-made services catering to all of these customer groups. The organisation's expertise, presence and exclusive access to networks and stakeholders in both the public and private sectors in international markets gives it the unique ability to help clients understand and navigate local market challenges in order to expand their business and unlock growth.

The organisation has a strong presence in Sweden, with 16 offices from north to south. Its global business developers in Sweden work directly with the internationalisation of companies, from education and inspiration to practical advice. At the head office in Stockholm, it has a number of export and investment experts who can help companies with advice and market information.

== History ==
When the organization was formed, Ulf Berg became the CEO. He had previously led the Export Council since 2003. Berg was forced to resign after only nine months in the new organization, and was succeeded on April 1, 2014 by Ylva Berg. In March 2021, Ylva Berg was succeeded as CEO by Jan Larsson, former head of information at Handelsbanken.

Under the leadership of Jan Larsson and the regional Vice Presidents, the organization has undergone a period of extensive and sustainable growth both in revenue and talent pool. With an expanded and more robust presence abroad, the firm has strengthened its position as the go to partner for Swedish companies looking to explore new markets.

Business Sweden is frequently quoted by Dagens Industri, Sweden's largest business newspaper, and representatives of the company often share key perspectives and insights on economic developments, trends and challenges faced by Swedish companies in export markets on various news programs.
