= Jorge Kosmas Sifaki =

Panamanian attorney (born 1977)

Jorge Kosmas Sifaki (born 28 December 1977) is a Panamanian attorney specialized in Corporate and Finance Law (Fordham University) and former Ambassador and Consul general of Panama to Japan (2009–2014).

Jorge was born into a family of Greek descent, from Koroni. His brother is the secretary of the Greek community in Panama. When Jorge was appointed as Ambassador of Panama to Japan, he became the youngest Ambassador to ever occupy this position for his country. During his five years occupying this post, he worked towards modernizing Panama's Flag Registry in Japan and also in attaining high interest of Japanese Companies to invest in Panama. He also helped put in place the financing granted by the Japanese Government for the Line 3 of Panama Metro Project. Jorge has also held posts in Korea and Samoa.

In 2014, he was awarded by the Government and Emperor of Japan the Grand Cordon of the Order of the Rising Sun.

Jorge Kosmas is married and has two children.

He is partner at Kosmas & Kosmas, a Panamanian law firm with over 25 years of experience.
