= Joseph Bower Siddall =

Dr Joseph Bower Siddall

Personal details
- Born: 4 March 1840 Matlock, Derbyshire, England
- Died: 4 July 1925 (aged 85) Malvern, England
- Spouse: Mary Elizabeth Binns (1844-1906)
- Occupation: Doctor, Member of British Legation to Japan
- Known for: Medical Developments in Japan

Dr Joseph Bower Siddall (4 March 1840 – 4 July 1904) was a British medical doctor who worked as a foreign advisor in Japan and was influential in the use of hygiene in Japanese Military hospitals, and universal vaccination for Smallpox.

== Biography ==
Siddall was born in Matlock, Derbyshire, United Kingdom in 1840. he received a Medical degree at Aberdeen University in 1865 and gained entitlement to use Letters MDCM or "Doctorem Medicinae et Chirurgiae Magistrum".(1)

In 1868 he went to Japan as Medical Officer to the British Legation where under the direction of Dr William Willis he took control of the hospital at Yokohama, and later Tokyo during the war of 1869-1869. Here he performed pioneering work in hygiene control (2), and taught Japanese surgeons techniques of bandaging and splinting (3).

He was a vocal enthusiast for the Smallpox vaccine.(2,3) His work on this led to his being awarded the Order of the Rising Sun, 4th Class in 1909. He was the first foreigner to be given the honour of this award, but was not given permission by the British Foreign Office to receive it until 1909.(2,3,4) The medal is held in the British Museum Coin and Medal Collection. (5)

He practised for a time at Ross on Wye, and retired to Devonshire.

== Sporting Interests ==
This information is sourced from his BMJ obituary.(2) He was a founding member of the Royal North Devon Golf Club.

As a cricketer he was a batsman for the Gentlemen of England and among his boasts in old age were that he had played with all the Three Graces and had once smashed the clock at The Oval.
