= Ronnie Watt =

Scottish martial artist (born 1947)

- Watt in 2010
- Born: Ronald Stewart Watt; 16 April 1947 (age 79); Aberdeen, Scotland
- Other names: Ronnie Watt
- Style: Shotokan Karate
- Rank: 10th Dan Meijin

Ronald Stewart Watt OBE (born 16 April 1947), is a Scottish grandmaster of Shotokan karate.

A World Karate Confederation (WKC) director of Shotokan since 2003, Watt is the founding president and chief instructor for the National Karate Institute Scotland.

== Biography ==
Born and educated in Aberdeen, Watt was training as an engineer until 1965 when a life-changing industrial accident forced a career rethink.

Oddjob a character in the James Bond film Goldfinger provided his initial inspiration, since when Watt established "Shotokan Karate Club" before pursuing further studies in Japan, then becoming Scottish team captain (1975–78).

Having introduced thousands of Scots to karate, since 2024 Watt is accorded the style of 10th Dan.

== Karate rankings ==
Watt has been bestowed karate Dan ranking as follows:

- 1st - 1969;
- 2nd - 1972;
- 3rd - 1976;
- 4th - 1981;
- 5th - 1986;
- 6th - 1994;
- 7th - 1997;
- 8th - 2005;
- 9th - 2015;
- 10th - 2024.

=== Order of the Scottish Samurai ===
In 1994, the Order of the Scottish Samurai (OSS), an "awarding body recognising excellence, character and respect in alignment with the ancient spirit of budō", was established by Watt.

== Honours and awards ==
Throughout his career in karate, Watt has received various honours, including:

=== Honours ===
- Officer of the Order of the British Empire (2011) "for services to karate"
- Member of the Order of St John (2020)
- Order of the Rising Sun with Gold and Silver Rays (5th Cl. Japan) (2010);

=== Distinctions ===
- Trnava Self-Governing Region (TSGR) Commemorative Medal (Slovakia) (2014)
- Knight of the Order of the Holy Trinity (Ethiopia) (2015)
- Comendador da Casa Real Portuguesa (2015);

=== Awards ===
- Fellow of the International Shotokan-Ryu Karate-Do Shihankai (2006)
- European Martial Arts Hall of Fame (2015)
- Hon. MUniv, Aberdeen (2019)
- 10th Dan Meijin Ryu Karate-Do (2024).

=== Arms ===
Coat of arms of Ronald Stewart Watt
Adopted Granted by the Lord Lyon, Edinburgh (2016) Crest A Tiger salient Proper Escutcheon Argent from a Mound Vert an Oak Tree Proper fructed Or and on a Chief enarched Gules a Wreath of Oak Leaves of the Third Motto (Above) Procede Cor Fortis (Latin) Orders Beneath the Shield the insignia suspended by their respective ribands of an OBE, MStJ and ORS Symbolism On 25 May 2010 at Edinburgh, Consul-General Masataka Tarahara, on behalf of Emperor Akihito and the Japanese Government, invested Watt as an Officer of the Order of the Rising Sun (with Gold and Silver Rays), in recognition of outstanding contributions to karate and his commitment to strengthening the relationship between Scotland and Japan.
