= Jochem P. Hanse =

Dutch businessman

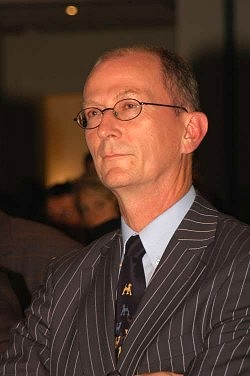

Jochem P. Hanse is a former Commissioner of the Netherlands Foreign Investment Agency. In June 2007, he was awarded the Order of the Rising Sun, Gold Rays with Neck Ribbon, by the Japanese government, in recognition of his contributions to promote tighter economic relations between Japan and the Netherlands.
