= Jacob Raz =

Israeli professor of East Asian studies, Japanologist, Buddhist, and meditation teacher

- יעקב רז
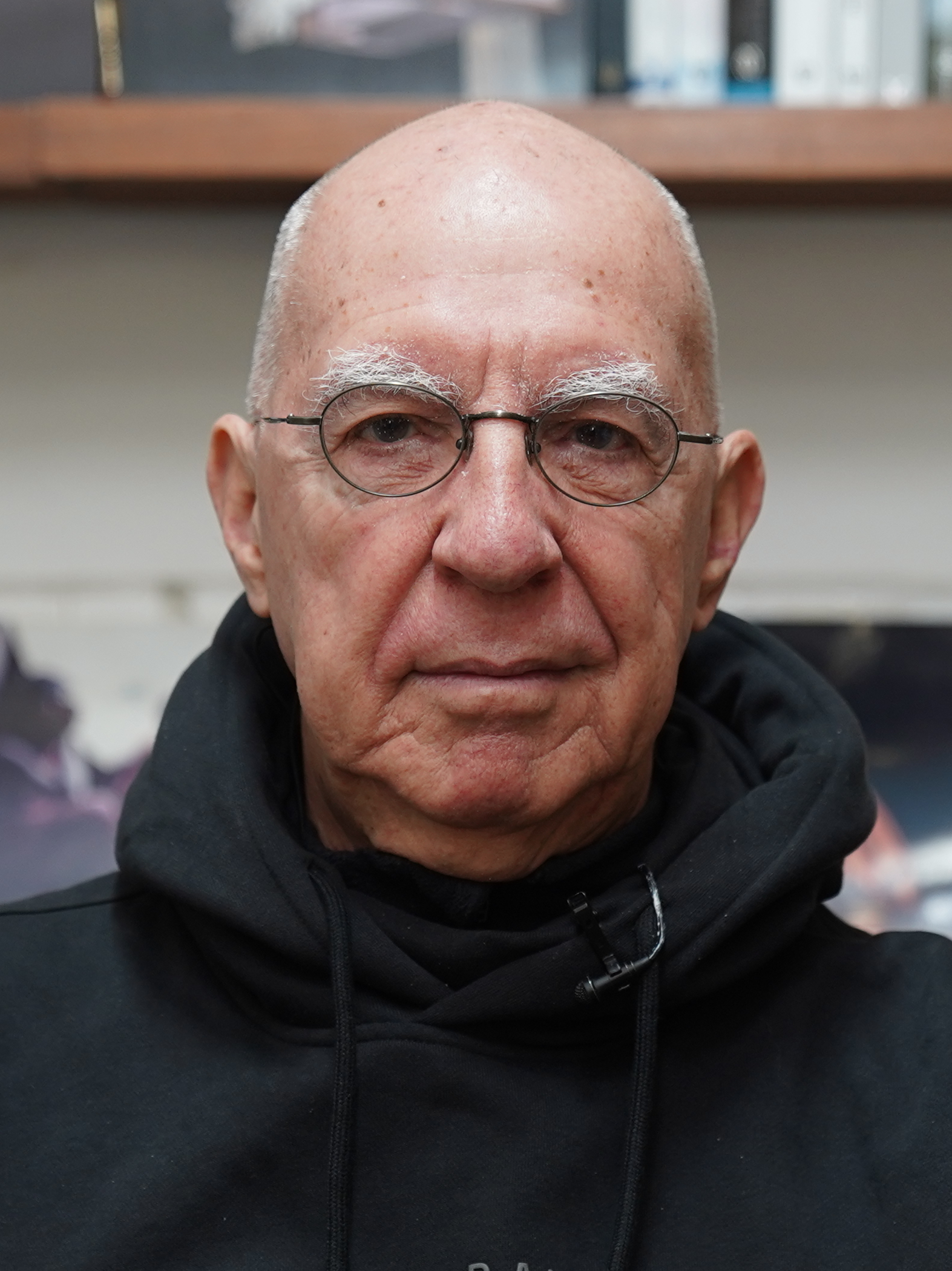
- Jacob Raz, March 2022
- Born: 1944 (age 81–82); Tel Aviv, Israel
- Occupations: director; researcher; writer; teacher
- Known for: East Asian culture research; Theatre directing; Meditation teaching

Jacob Raz (Hebrew: יעקב רז; born in 1944) is a professor emeritus in the Department of East Asian studies at Tel Aviv University, a researcher of Japanese culture and a translator of Zen writings, a writer and a poet who writes, among other things, haiku poetry in Hebrew. Zen meditation teacher and Israeli social activist.

Raz defines himself as a Buddhist.

== Biography ==
Jacob Raz was born in the south of Tel Aviv, and grew up in the city center, on King George Street. He is a member of a family that originates in Thessaloniki. His father was a theater director in Greece. Raz studied at the 'Ahad Ha'am' elementary school and later studied the realism major at Urban High School A. Raz learned to play the piano starting at the age of six with private teachers and at the Israel Conservatory of Music in Tel Aviv. Raz was an apprentice in the scout movement in the tribe "Gosh Scofus Kishishim" in Tel Aviv, in the army he served in the Nahal Brigade and was a member of Kibbutz Hatzerim for several years.

He studied philosophy and theater for a bachelor's degree at Tel Aviv University. Most of the classes in the philosophy department were on Western philosophy. At the same time, a seminar on classical Chinese philosophy was held in the department, which was given by Daniel Leslie from Australia. He began to study classical Chinese, and later, Japanese. During his academic studies, he became interested in theater, and began to direct. In the theater department, he was among the founders of a small group, the 'University Theatre', which produced plays that were also presented outside the university. The first play he directed was "Escorial" (1970) by the Belgian playwright (whose parents were Flemish) Michel de Galderud. The second play he directed was "Michael Koolhaas", based on the novel of the same name by Heinrich von Kleist, adapted by Aliza Aliyon-Israeli.

He wrote his master's thesis on the Irish poet W.B. Yeats and the interest he discovered in the East, focusing on the Japanese 'no' theater. In this work he combined research in aesthetics, theater and intercultural translation. The work was submitted in 1972 under the title "William Butler Yeats and the Japanese No Theater". At the same time, he began studying with the Japanese Zen teacher Kyodo Roshi, who lived in Israel for ten years. Raz also began studying the Japanese language, with the Inka Piateli.

In 1972 Raz went to study in Japan on a scholarship from the Japanese Ministry of Education. He studied at Waseda University in Tokyo between 1972 and 1977. His doctoral thesis dealt with the connection between aesthetics and anthropology and his subject was the audience of the Japanese theater.

When Raz returned to Israel, he began teaching in the theater department at the Faculty of Arts at Tel Aviv University. Later, he moved to teach in the Department of East Asian Studies at the Hebrew University. After five years at the Hebrew University, he returned to Tel Aviv University, where he co-founded the Department of East Asian Studies.

Raz was interested in the figure of the other and the marginal cultures in Japanese culture and researched the subject with the tools of cultural research and anthropology. In the late 1980s he received a large research grant from the Toyota Foundation and headed a team of American-Japanese researchers who studied the subject. Later on, the research focused on the anthropological aspects of the Japanese crime world, the yakuza, which Raz studied for about five years. The research yielded three books: a book of a collection of studies on the figure of the other in Japanese culture, and two books on the Japanese crime organization, the yakuza: one book is research and the other is a fictional novel.

Since the nineties, Raz's main interest is Buddhism, both as a subject for research and as a possible way of life for the modern Western man. He also deals with the interaction of Buddhism and the West, in various fields such as psychology, society, social involvement, ecology, peacemaking.

In 2006, Raz was awarded the "Order of the Rising Sun" by the Japanese government, in recognition of his research work and his contribution to the spread of Japanese culture.

In 1978, Yoni, Raz's only son, was born, a child with special needs.

=== Buddhism ===
Beginning in the early 1990s, Raz concentrated his writing and teaching on Buddhism, especially the Chinese and Japanese varieties. It deals with interpretations and dialogue with texts of classical Buddhism – Indian, Chinese and Japanese – as well as with aspects of the dialogue between Asian Buddhism and the Western world. Among the doctoral studies he directs, many deal with the dialogue between Buddhism and psychology, Buddhism and social engagement, conflict resolution, and peace activism. This field of activity has produced a large number of articles and books, among them, Zen Buddhism – Philosophy and Aesthetics (2006), a book in which Raz reviews various issues in history, thought, poetry and Zen-Buddhist aesthetics.

One of the results of Raz's many years of dealing with Buddhism in its practical and theoretical aspects is a called So I Heard (2013). This is a book of personal thoughts on Buddhism, based on conversations that Raz has had with meditation groups since 2010. The book was published in August 2013 by Moden.

== Translations ==
Along with Yoel Hoffman, Raz is a translator of haiku poetry into Hebrew. Among his translations are beautiful literature ("Kokoro" and "Volcano"), classic and modern tanka and haiku poetry ("Salad Anniversary", "The Narrow Road to Oko"), Zen stories and Zen poetry. In his various books he combines many translations from Chinese and Japanese thought.

So I Heard – Zen Note is a book of poetry written by Yaakov Raz. It is described by its author as "a journey of observation, records, and conversations with life and with Buddhism." Among the poems, which weave the Buddhist world of the soul into Raz's life story (for example, treatment of his son with Down syndrome), famous koans, Japanese calligraphy and rabbinic wisdom are interspersed. The book came out in 2013 and was received positively.

== Public activity ==
Following the birth of his son Yoni, Raz was one of the founders of the association "DSC – Down syndrome children" (Hebrew: ית"ד - ילדי תסמונת דאון) in 1981. The association helps parents whose children have Down syndrome, both in the field of information and with practical help. Later, Raz also served as chairman of Akim Tel Aviv.

In 2000, Raz and clinical psychologist Nachi Alon founded the Psycho-Dharma Center, a school of Buddhist psychology, which today operates on the Cypress campus in Tel Aviv.

== Books ==
- 1972 William Butler Yeats and the Japanese "No" Theater. Tel Aviv: Tel Aviv University.
- 1983 Audience and actors: A study of their interaction in the Japanese traditional theater, Leiden: E.J. Brill.
- 1992 Aspects of Otherness in Japanese Culture, Tokyo: Institute for the study of Languages and Cultures of Asia and Africa.
- 1995 Crazy Conversations – Acts of Zen. Tel Aviv: Moden.
- 1996 Man looking for bull. Translated, commented and added their own by Jacob Raz and Dan Daur. Ben Shemen: Moden.
- 1996 Yakuza no bunka jinruigaku: "Ura" kara mita nihon [The Anthropology of Yakuza: Japan as Seen from its Backside], Tokyo: Iwanami Shoten Publishers, 1996 (Japanese).
- 2000 Japanese Mythology. Tel Aviv: Tel Aviv Books.
- 2000 Tokyo round trip. Tel Aviv: Moden.
- 2004 Yakuza My Brother: A Personal Journey into the Japanese Mafia. Ben Shemen: Moden. (Also published in Japanese, 2007, and Russian, 2011).
- 2006 The Narrow Road to Uko, by Matsuo Basho, translation and essays. Tel Aviv: Hargol.
- 2006 Zen Buddhism – Philosophy and Aesthetics. Tel Aviv, Broadcasting University, Ministry of Defense – the publishing house.
- 2013 So I Heard – Zen Lists. Dharma talks. Moden publishing house.
- 2017 towards what. Haiku poems. Missing Moon books.

== A selection of translations from Japanese ==
- 1979 in the grove – by Ryunosuke Akutagawa. Literary supplement 'Masha', newspaper 'Lamerhav'.
- 1983 Kokoro – by Natsuma Sousaki. Jerusalem: Crown Books.
- 1984 Volcano – by Shusaku Ando, Tel Aviv: Zamora Beitan.
- 1994 Salad Anniversary – by Machi Tawara, translation and afterword. Tel Aviv: Poalim Library.
- 2006 The Narrow Road to Oko – by Matsuo Basho. Translation and articles. Tel Aviv: Hargol Publishing.
- 2023 Fire on the Hill – by Tanda Santoka, poetry and diary excerpts, Tel Aviv: Missing Moon Books.
