= Order of the Rising Sun =

Japanese order

Order of the Rising Sun 旭日章
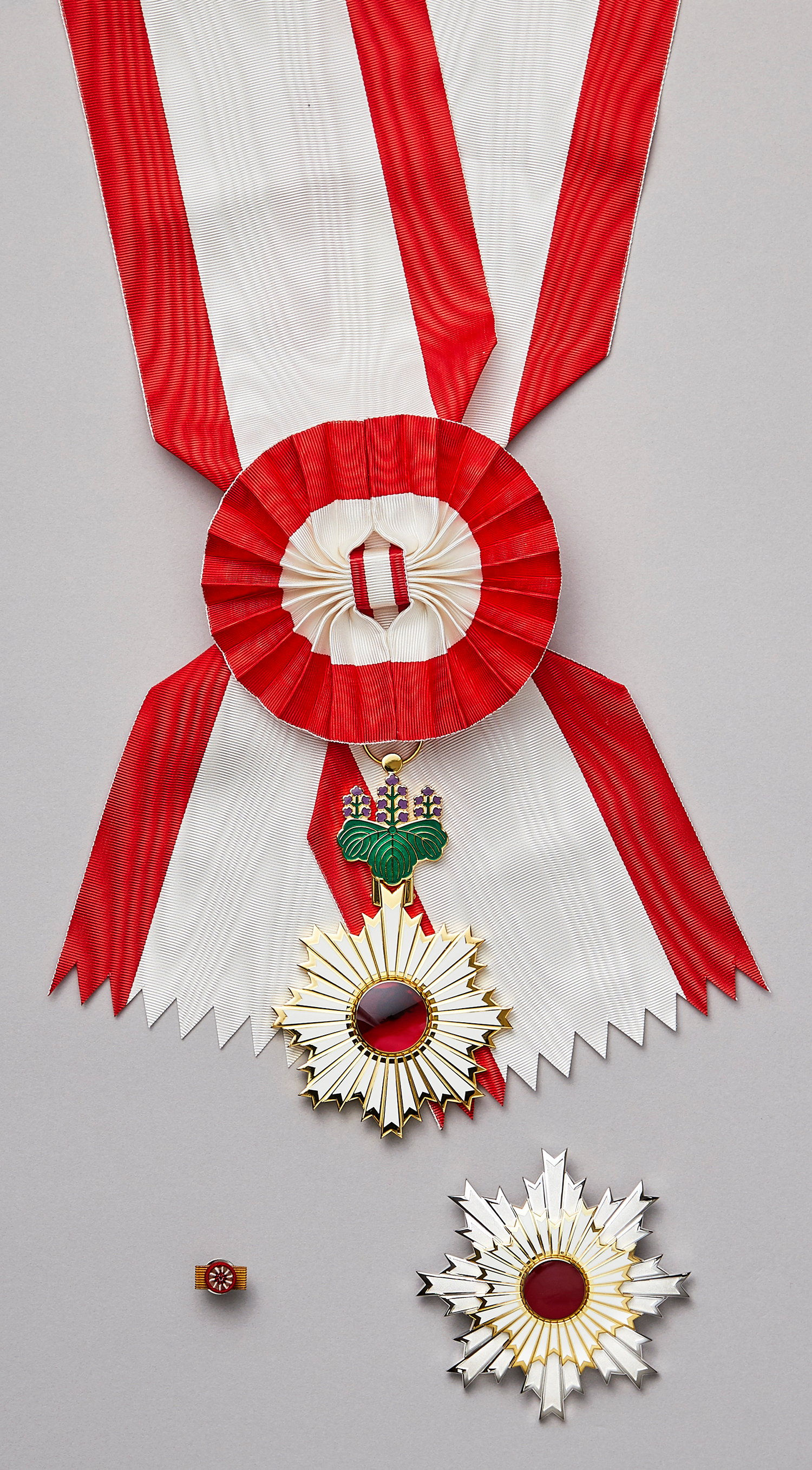
- Grand Cordon of the Order of the Rising Sun (1st class)

Awarded by the Emperor of Japan
- Type: Order
- Founded: 10 April 1875
- Awarded for: Meritorious service to the state
- Status: Currently constituted
- Sovereign: HM The Emperor
- Grades: 1st through 8th Class (1875–2003); Since 2003: Grand Cordon; Gold and Silver Star (Rays, Principal Grade); Gold Rays with Neck Ribbon (Cordon, Middle Grade); Gold Rays with Rosette (Cordon, Junior Grade); Gold and Silver Rays (Double Rays); Silver Rays (Single Ray)

Precedence
- Next (higher): Order of the Paulownia Flowers
- Equivalent: Order of the Sacred Treasure; Order of the Precious Crown; Order of Culture

The Order of the Rising Sun (旭日章, Kyokujitsu-shō) is a Japanese order established in 1875 by Emperor Meiji. It was the first national decoration instituted by the Japanese government and is awarded to individuals who have made distinguished contributions to the state or the public. It may be conferred on both Japanese and foreign nationals. The insignia depicts a central sun disc surrounded by rays, with paulownia flowers and leaves on its suspension.

The order has six classes. Under reforms introduced in 2003, its seventh and eighth classes were abolished, numerical class designations were replaced by distinctive titles, and eligibility was extended to women. Its former highest decoration, the Order of the Rising Sun with Paulownia Flowers, became the separate Order of the Paulownia Flowers. Under the current system, the Order of the Rising Sun recognises distinguished achievements, while the Order of the Sacred Treasure principally recognises long and meritorious service in public or public-related roles.

== Criteria for awarding ==
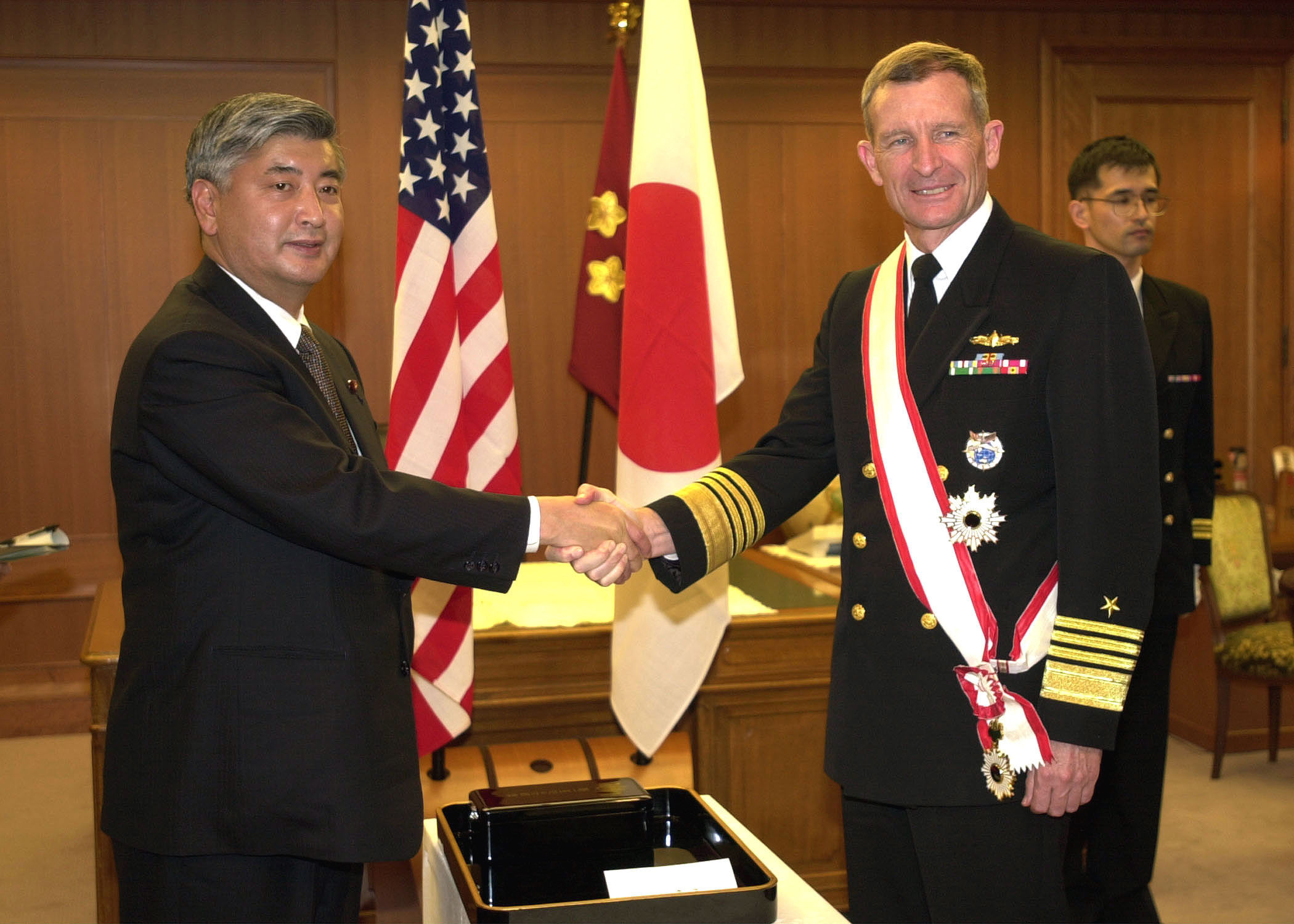
US Navy Admiral Dennis C. Blair (2002). He was awarded the Grand Cordon of the Order of the Rising Sun (1st class) for his contribution to the stability and development of the international community.

The Order of the Rising Sun is awarded to the following contributions of women, men or other persons;

- to the stability and development of the international community.
- to the realization of appropriate tax payment.
- to the promotion of school education or social education.
- to the promotion of culture or sports.
- to the promotion of science and technology.
- to the improvement and promotion of social welfare.
- to the improvement and promotion of the health or public health of citizens.
- to the improvement of the working environment for workers.
- to environmental conservation.

The same conditions are valid for a person who

- is engaged in the business of agriculture, forestry, fisheries, commerce, mining, industry, information and communications industry, construction industry, real estate industry, finance and insurance industry, service industry, etc., and has contributed to the public interest by developing the economy and industry.
- has contributed to the public interest by engaging in the services of an attorney, certified public accountant, patent attorney, etc.
- contributed to the public interest by engaging in the work of newspapers, broadcasting or other news reporting.
- is engaged in a public interest business such as Electricity Business, Gas Business, Transportation Business, etc. and has contributed to the promotion of public welfare.
- A person other than those listed in the preceding items who has contributed to the public interest.

Among them, regulations on the criteria for awarding orders to those who belong to the National Diet, the central and local governments, and courts stipulate in detail which ranks are awarded for each position. For example, the Grand Cordon of the Order of the Rising Sun (1st class) is awarded to a person who has made outstanding achievements in his/her position as Prime Minister, Speaker of the House of Representatives, President of the House of Councillors, or Chief Justice of Japan. The Grand Cordon of the Order of the Rising Sun (1st class) or the Order of the Rising Sun, Gold and Silver Rays (2nd class) are awarded to a person who has made outstanding achievements in his/her position as Minister of State, Deputy Chief Cabinet Secretary, Senior Vice-Minister, Vice Speaker of the House of Representatives, Vice President of the House of Councilors, or Judge of the Supreme Court.

== Classes ==
The Order was awarded in nine classes until 2003, when the Grand Cordon with Paulownia Flowers was made a separate order, and the lowest two classes were abolished. Since then, it has been awarded in six classes. Conventionally, a diploma is prepared to accompany the insignia of the order, and in some rare instances, the personal signature of the Emperor will have been added. As an illustration of the wording of the text, a translation of a representative 1929 diploma says:

By the grace of Heaven, Emperor of Japan, seated on the throne occupied by the same dynasty from time immemorial,

We confer the Second Class of the Imperial Order of Meiji upon Henry Waters Taft, a citizen of the United States of America and a director of the Japan Society of New York, and invest him with the insignia of the same class of the Order of the Double Rays of the Rising Sun, in expression of the good will which we entertain towards him.

In witness whereof, we have hereunto set our hand and caused the Grand Seal of State to be affixed at the Imperial Palace, Tokyo, this thirteenth day of the fifth month of the fourth year of Shōwa, corresponding to the 2,589th year from the accession to the throne of Emperor Jimmu."

== Insignia ==
The star for the Grand Cordon and Second Class is a silver star of eight points, each point having three alternating silver rays; the central emblem is identical to the badge. It is worn on the left chest for the Grand Cordon and on the right chest for the 2nd Class.

The badge for the Grand Cordon to Sixth Classes is an eight-pointed badge bearing a central red enamelled sun disc, with gilt points (1st–4th Classes), with four gilt and four silver points (5th Class), or with silver points (6th Class); each point comprises three white enamelled rays. It is suspended from three enamelled paulownia leaves (not chrysanthemum leaves as the Decoration Bureau page claims) on a ribbon in white with red border stripes, worn as a sash from the right shoulder for the Grand Cordon, as a necklet for the 2nd and 3rd Classes and on the left chest for the 4th to 6th Classes (with a rosette for the 4th Class).

The badge for the Seventh and Eighth Classes consisted of a silver medal in the shape of three paulownia leaves, enamelled for the 7th Class and plain for the 8th Class. Both were suspended on a ribbon, again in white with red border stripes, and worn on the left chest. Both classes were abolished in 2003 and replaced by the Order of the Paulownia Flowers, a single-class order that now ranks above the Order of the Rising Sun.

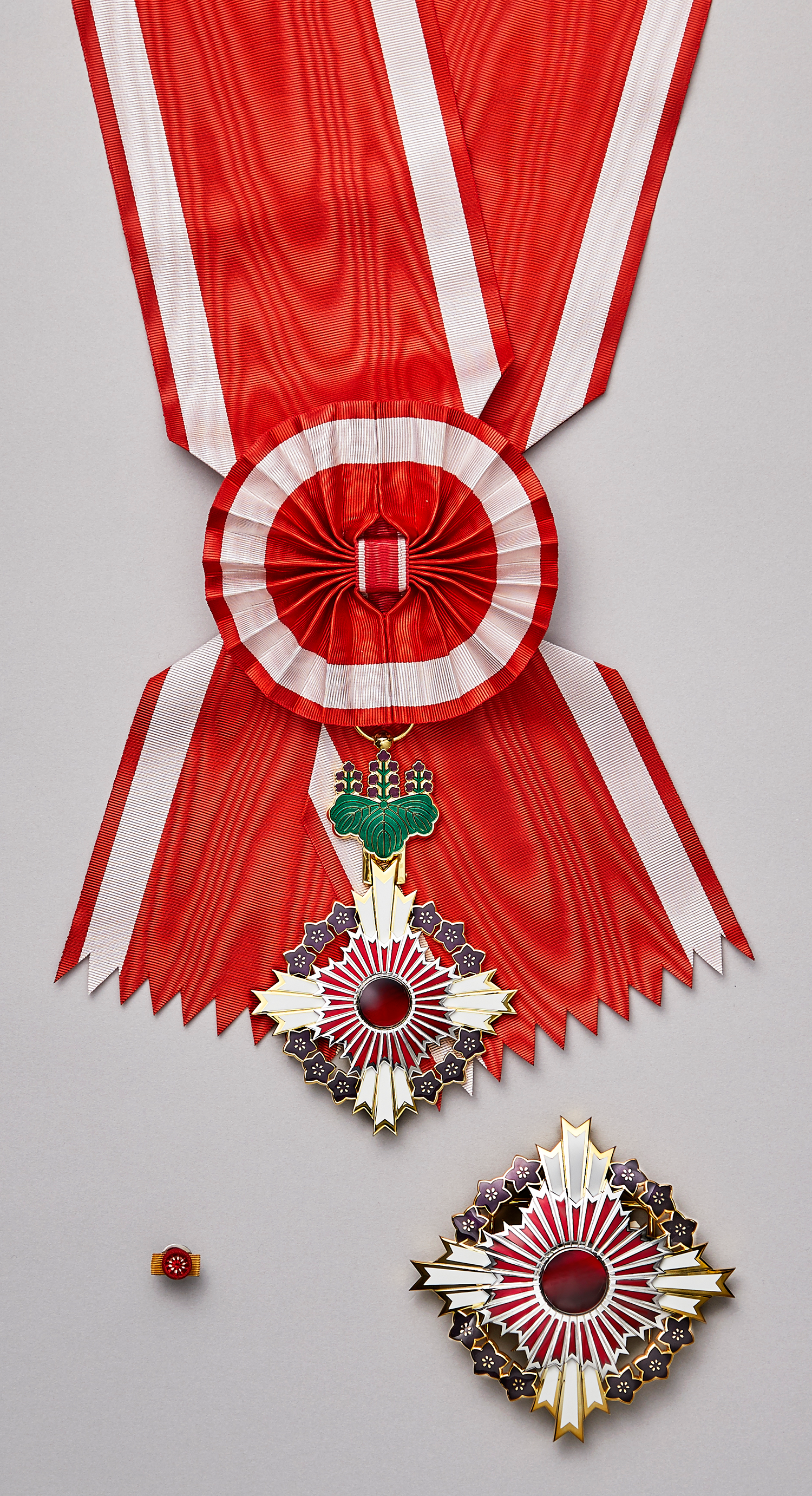
Separated into higher order in 2003 (upper half of the 1st Class before 2003)

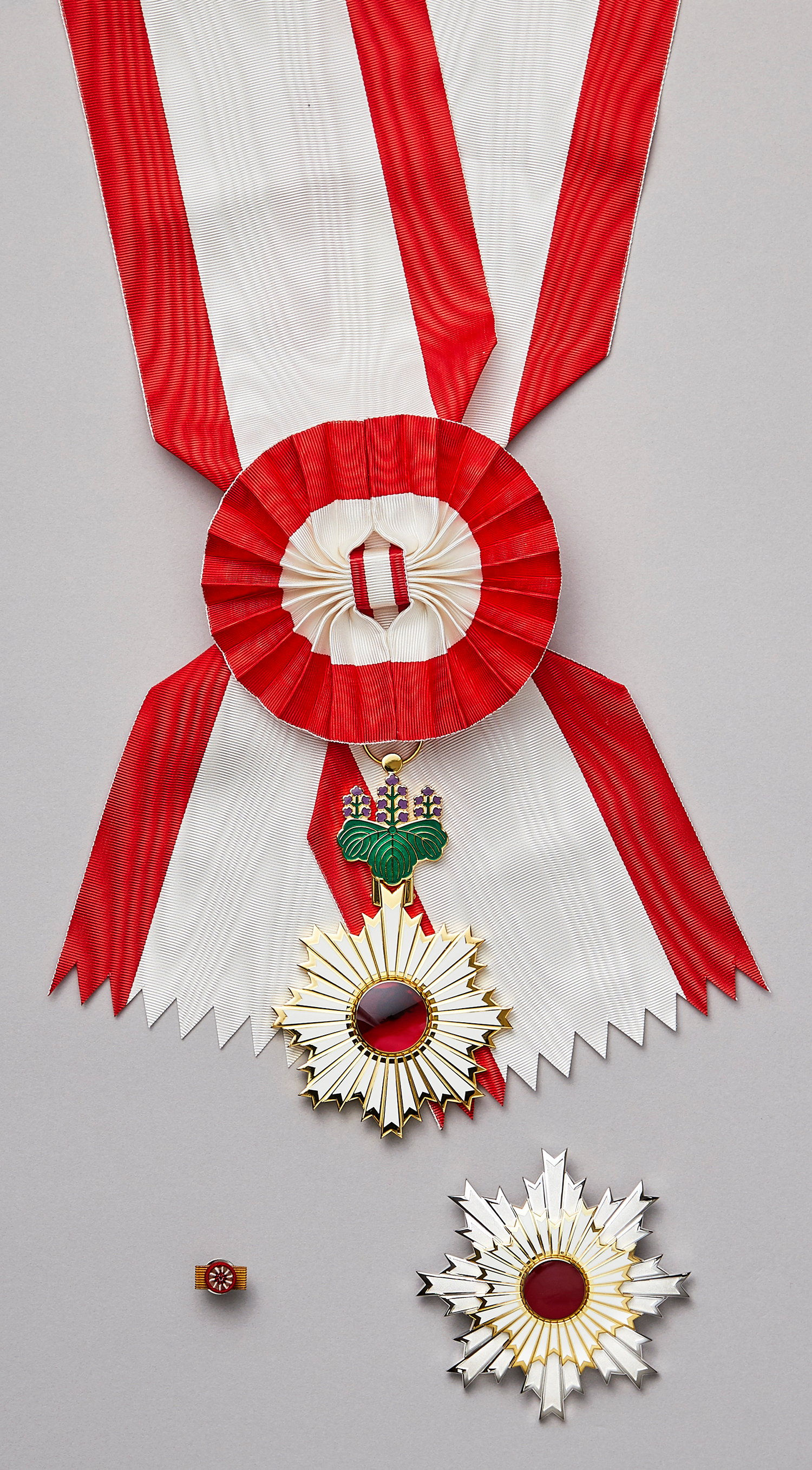
Grand Cordon of the Order of the Rising Sun (1st class)

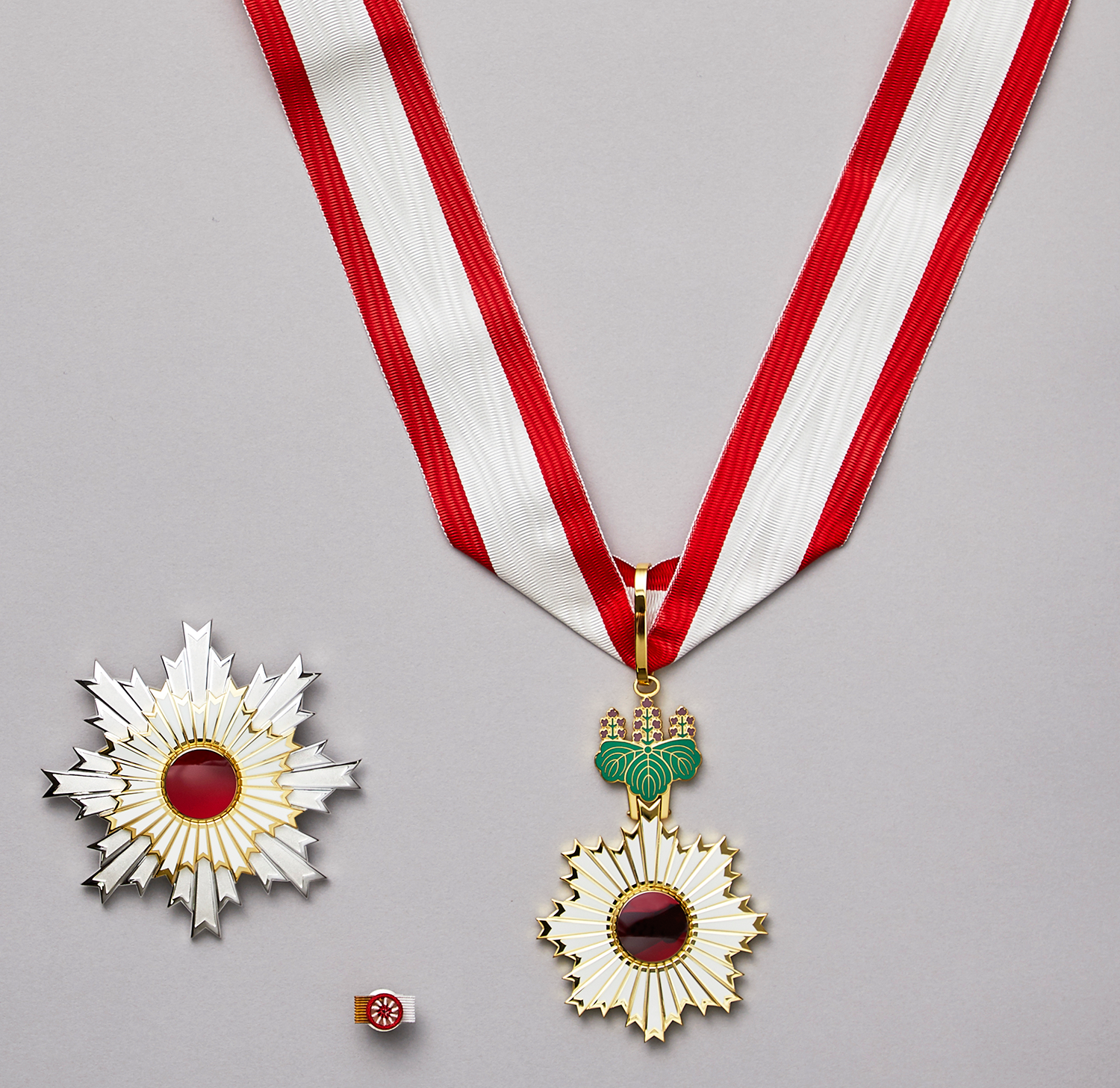
The Order of the Rising Sun, Gold and Silver Star (2nd class)

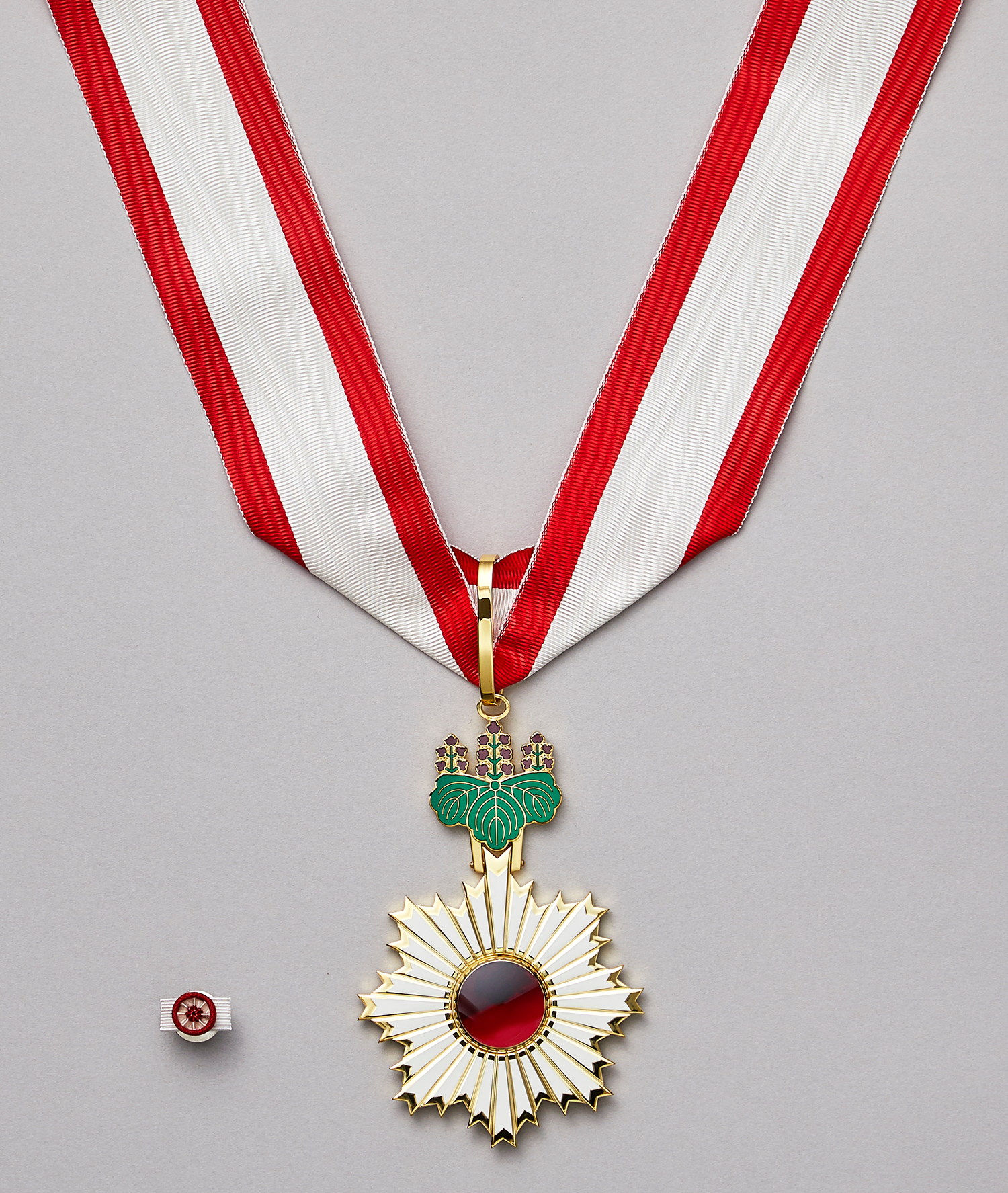
The Order of the Rising Sun, Gold Rays with Neck Ribbon (3rd class)

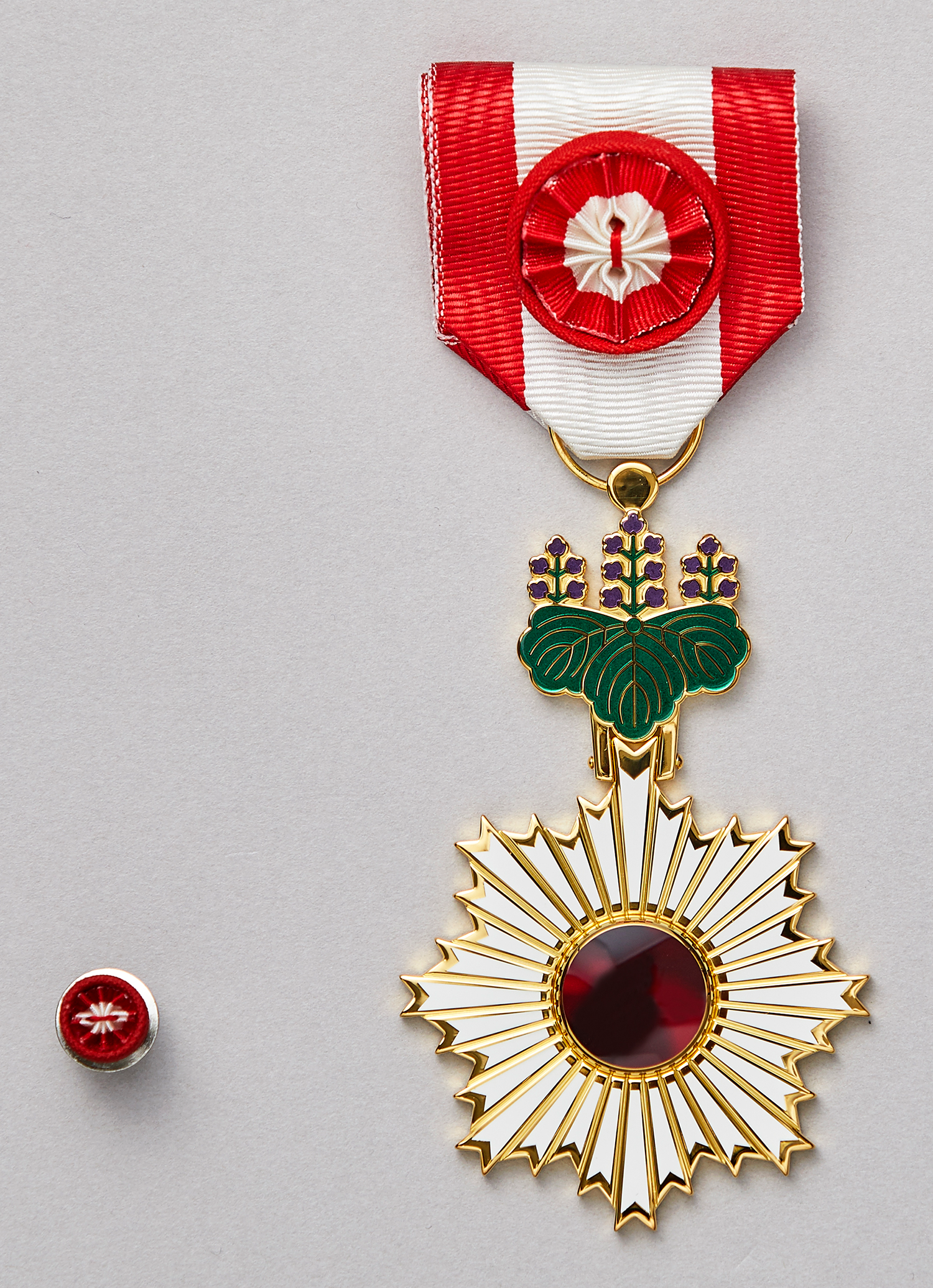
The Order of the Rising Sun, Gold Rays with Rosette (4th class)

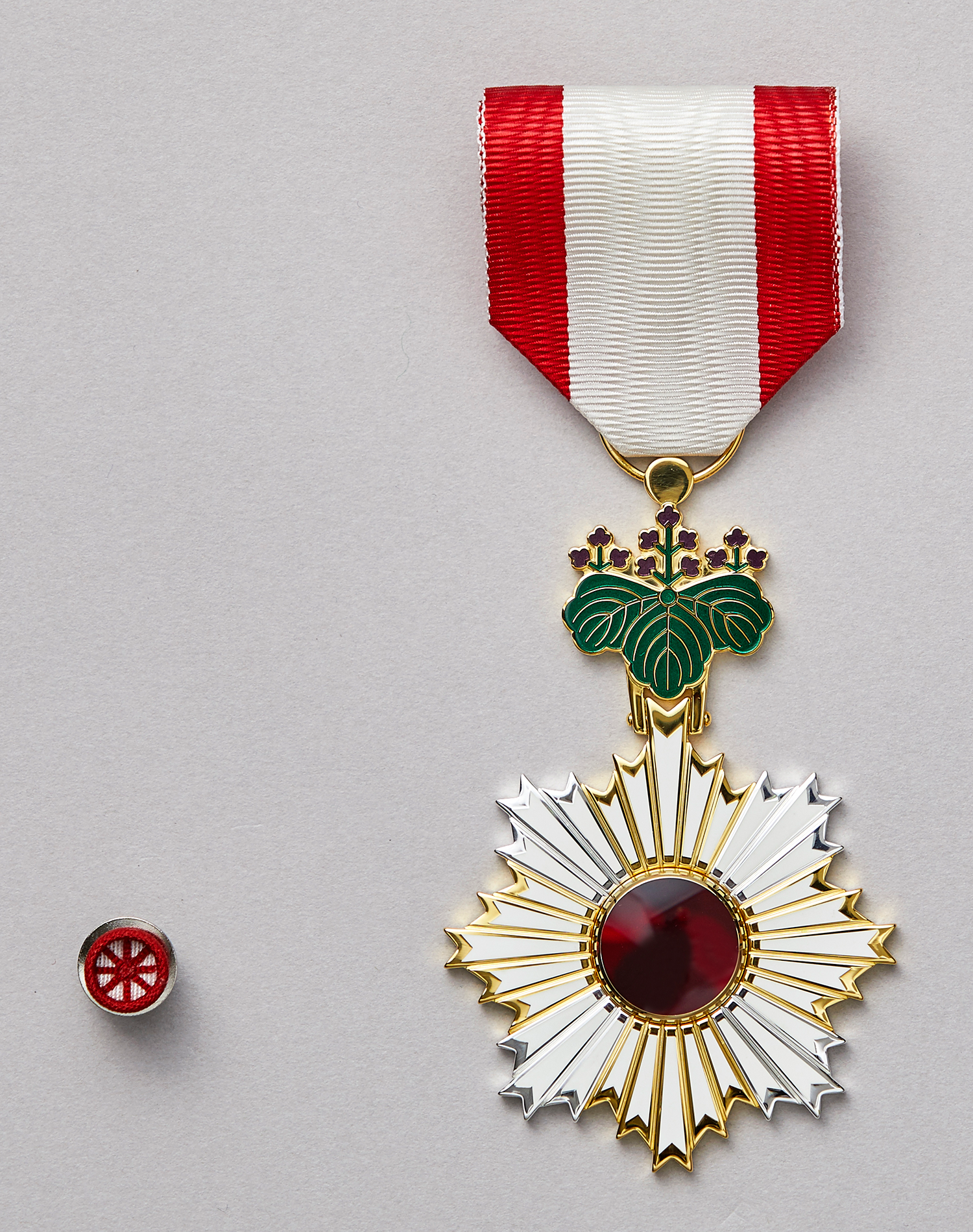
The Order of the Rising Sun, Gold and Silver Rays (5th class)

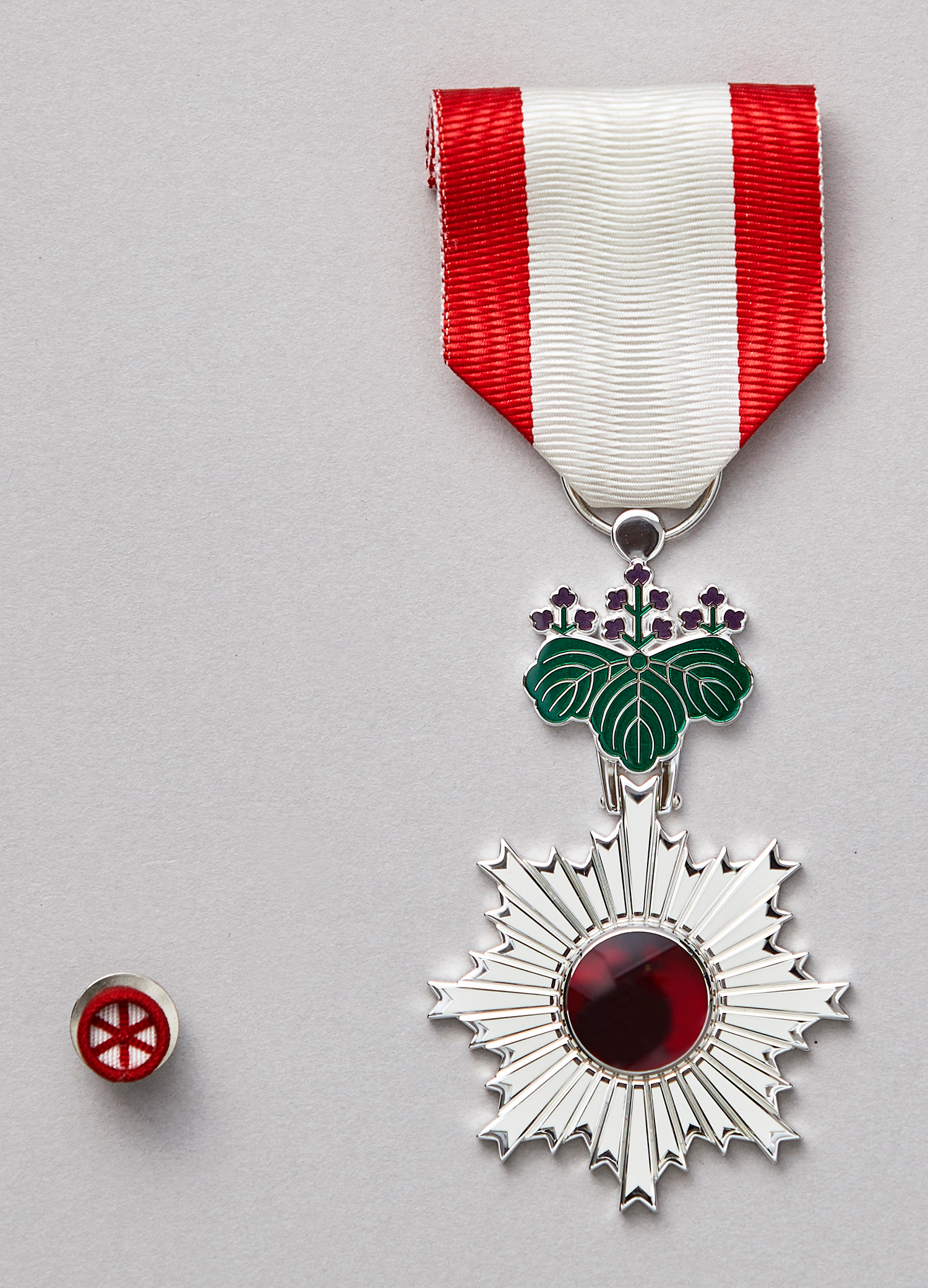
The Order of the Rising Sun, Silver Rays (6th class)

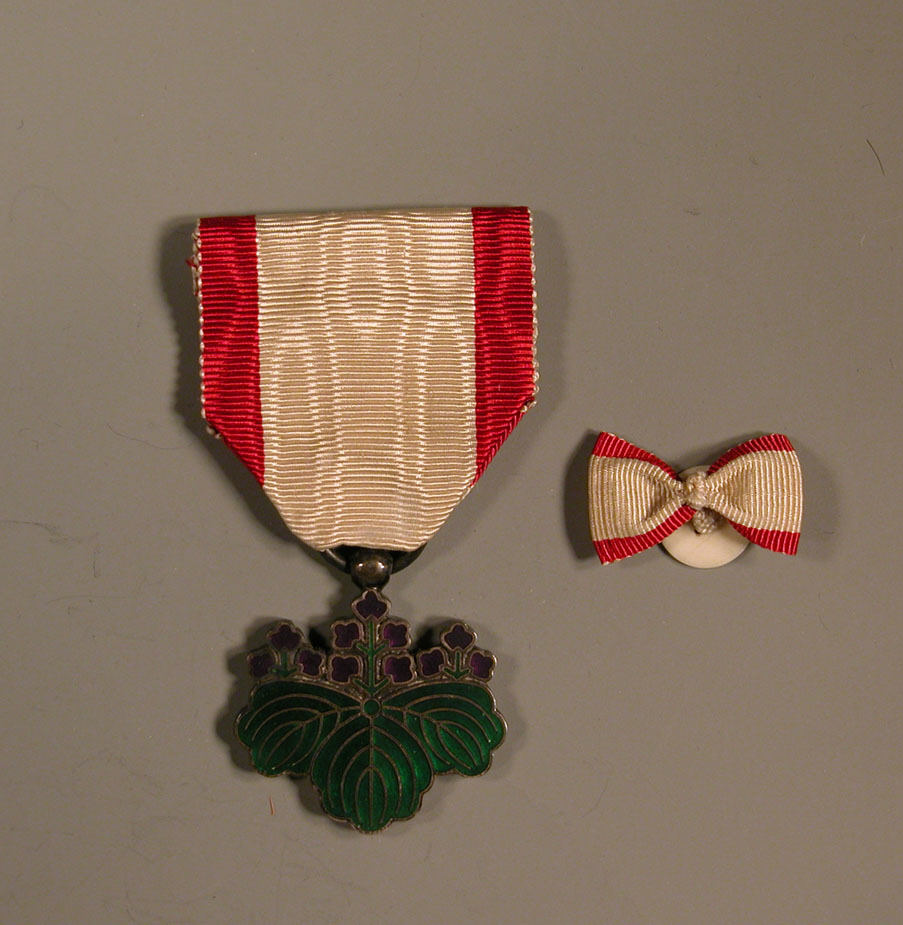
7th Class (abolished in 2003)

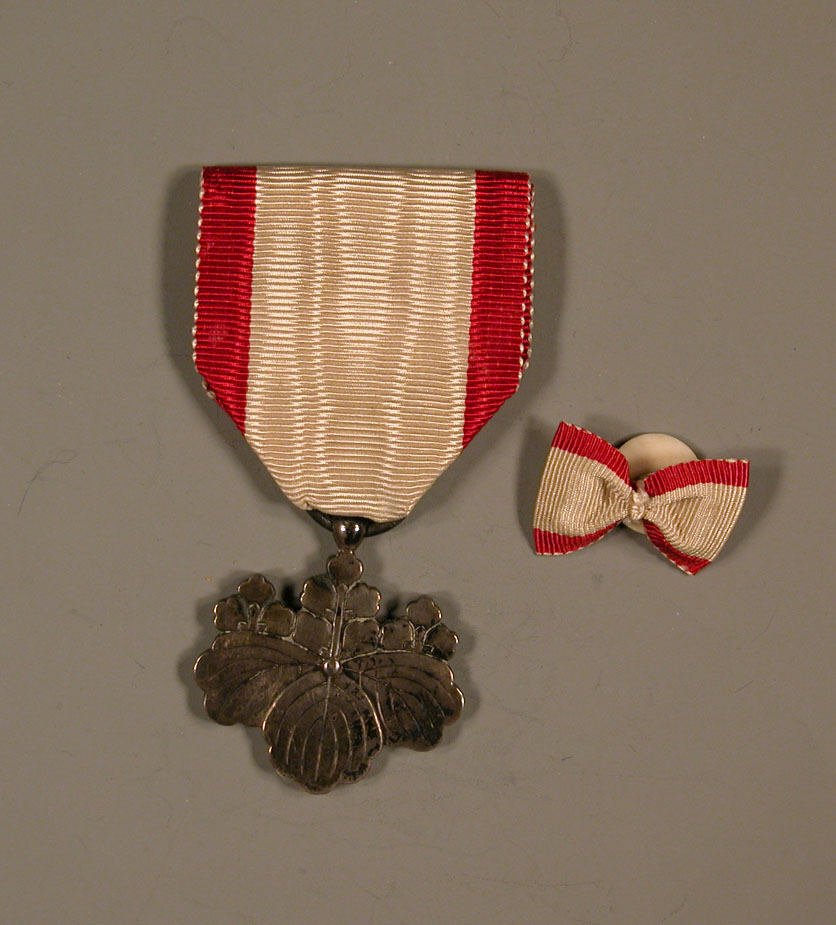
8th Class (abolished in 2003)

== Notable recipients ==
=== 1st Class, Grand Cordon ===

- Tony Abbott (1957–), Former Australian Prime Minister, 2022
- Creighton Abrams
- Aziz Abduhakimov, 2022
- Syed Hamid Albar, 2019
- Edmund Allenby, 1921
- James F. Amos, 2014
- Michael Armacost, 2007
- Richard Armitage, 2015
- Pridi Banomyong (1900–1983)
- Arthur Barrett, 1921
- Edmund Barton (1849–1920), Former Australian Prime Minister, 1905
- Carol Bellamy, 2006
- Felix von Bendemann, 1906
- Abdelmalek Benhabyles, 2012
- Charles Reed Bishop (1822–1915)
- Dennis C. Blair, 2001
- Sepp Blatter, 2009
- Gustave Emile Boissonade (1825–1910), 1909
- Walther von Brauchitsch (1881–1948), 1942
- Sydney Brenner (1927–2019), 2017
- Laurens Jan Brinkhorst, 2009
- Vincent K. Brooks 2018
- Arleigh Burke (1901–1996)
- Rudolf Burmester (1875–1956)
- Erwin Bälz (1849–1913), 1905
- Ricardo Cabrisas, 2025
- George W. Casey Jr. 2010
- Krasae Chanawongse, 2004
- Dick Cheney, 2018
- William J. Crowe, Jr., 1984
- Helen Clark, 2017
- James Wheeler Davidson (1872–1933), 1896
- Kemal Derviş, 2009
- Carlos G. Dominguez (2022), former Philippine Finance Secretary
- Karl Dönitz, (1891–1980), 1943
- Leo Esaki, 1998
- Lee Hong Koo, 2014
- John Arbuthnot Fisher (1841–1920), 1917
- Malcolm Fraser, (1930–2015) Former Australian Prime Minister, 2006
- Jerome Isaac Friedman, 2016
- Bill Gates (1955–), Co-chair of the Bill & Melinda Gates Foundation, 2020
- Robert Gates, 2017
- Thamir Ghadhban, 2016
- Julia Gillard (1961–), Former Australian Prime Minister, 2021
- David L. Goldfein, 2021
- Stephen Gomersall, 2015
- Ralph Gonsalves, 2024
- Hermann Göring (1893–1946)
- António Guterres, 2002
- William Hague, 2017
- Sri Sultan Hamengkubuwono IX (1912–1988), 1982
- Edward Heath 1998
- Ginandjar Kartasasmita (1941–), 2008
- Jusuf Kalla (1942–), 2022
- Akbar Tandjung (1945–), 2022
- John Hamre, 2016
- Kenzaburo Hara (1907–2004), 1996
- Harry B. Harris Jr., 2018
- Dennis Hastert, 2010
- Bob Hawke (1929–2019), Former Australian Prime Minister, 2012
- Reinhard Heydrich (1904–1942), posthumous
- Musa Hitam, 2018
- Soichiro Honda (1906–1991), 1991
- John Howard (1939-), Former Australian Prime Minister, 2013
- Masaru Ibuka (1908–1997), 1997
- Daniel Inouye, 2000
- Henry Jackson (1855–1929)
- S. Jayakumar, 2012
- Karu Jayasuriya (1940–), 2016
- Anerood Jugnauth, 1988
- Henk Kamp, 2014
- Caroline Kennedy (1957–), 2021
- Abhakara Kiartivongse, 1900
- Thanom Kittikachorn
- Bert Koenders, 2014
- Komura Jutarō (1855–1911)
- Jorge Kosmas Sifaki, 2014
- John Kotelawala (1895–1980), 1954
- V. Krishnamurthy, 2009
- Wataru Kubo, 2001
- Ashwani Kumar, 2017
- Lee Hsien Loong (1952–), 2025
- Lee Kuan Yew (1923–2015), 1967
- Danzangiin Lündeejantsan (1957-), former Speaker of the Mongolian parliament, 2021
- Miroslav Lajčák, 2022
- Curtis LeMay (1906–1990) 1964
- Queen Liliʻuokalani (1838–1917), 1882
- Wangari Maathai, 2009
- Ibrahim Mabrouk (1873–1959), 1934
- Douglas MacArthur (1880–1964), 1960
- John Major, 2012
- Mike Mansfield, 1990
- Baron Yasutake Matsuoka, 1906
- Yōsuke Matsuoka, 1940
- John McCain, 2018
- John McEwen, 1973
- Franz-Michael Skjold Mellbin, 2011
- Robert Menzies (1894–1978), Former Australian Prime Minister, 1973
- Norman Yoshio Mineta (1931–2022), 2007
- Phumzile Mlambo-Ngcuka (1955–), 2022
- Amina C. Mohamed, 2017
- Mahathir Mohamad, 1991
- Mustapa Mohamed (1950–), 2024
- Ernest Moniz, 2017
- Ivan Mrkić, 2018
- Hendrik Pieter Nicolaas Muller (1859–1941)
- A. M. Nair, alias "Nair-San"
- Marty Natalegawa, 2025
- Ben Ngubane, 2010
- Peter Pace, 2007
- Leon E. Panetta, 2019 2019 Autumn Conferment of Decoration Secretary Leon E. Panetta
- Rear Admiral Ali Osman Pasha, 1890
- Andrew Peacock, Former Australian politician and diplomat, 2017
- Nancy Pelosi, 2015
- William J. Perry, 2002
- John J. Pershing, 1918
- Plaek Phibunsongkhram, 1942
- Józef Piłsudski, 1928
- Aquilino Pimentel III (2026), former Philippine Senate President
- Herbert Plumer (1857–1932)
- Ram Chandra Poudel, 2020
- John Roos (1955–), former United States Ambassador to Japan, 2022
- Yusuf Abdul Rahim, 1985
- Joachim von Ribbentrop (1893–1946), 1937
- Condoleezza Rice, 2017
- Edward A. Rice Jr.
- Jay Rockefeller, 2013
- Herman Van Rompuy, 2015
- Donald Rumsfeld, 2015
- Eishiro Saito, in 1992
- Saisho Atsushi, 1906
- Klaus Schwab, 2013
- Abid Sharifov, 2016
- Count Paul de Smet de Naeyer,
- Shoichiro Toyoda, 2002
- Chea Sim, 2013
- Edward Śmigły-Rydz, (1886–1941)
- Isamu Takeshita (1869–1949), 1920
- Strobe Talbott, 2016
- Masanori Tanimoto, former governor of Ishikawa Prefecture, 2023
- Ratan Tata, 2012
- Her Majesty Queen Te Atairangikaahu of New Zealand (1931–2006), 1970
- Tengku Ahmad Rithauddeen, 2018
- John Anthony Cecil Tilley (1869–1952)
- Tokugawa Yoshinobu (1837–1913), 1908
- Goh Chok Tong, 2011
- Matome Ugaki, ca. 1945.
- Cesar Virata, 2016
- Võ Hồng Phúc, 2012
- Wan Waithayakon
- Wang Jin-pyng (1957–), 2021
- John Whitehead (1932–2013), 2006
- Gough Whitlam, 2006
- Yi Kang, 1912

=== 2nd Class, Gold and Silver Star ===

- Mohammad Hossein Adeli (1953–), 2014
- Salem Ben Nasser Al-Ismaily, 2017
- Momofuku Ando (1910–2007), 2002
- Abbas Araghchi (1962–), 2022
- Jaime Zóbel de Ayala (1934–), 2018
- Zeti Akhtar Aziz (1947–), 2017
- Sri Sultan Hamengkubuwano X (1946–), 2022
- Arden L. Bement, Jr. (1932–), 2009
- Jagdish Bhagwati (1934–), 2006
- Henryka Bochniarz (1947–), 2010
- Louis Bols (1867–1930), 1921
- Gustave Emile Boissonade (1825–1910), 1876
- Donald Prentice Booth (1902–1993), 1961
- Georges Hilaire Bousquet (1846–1937), 1898
- Jules Brunet (1838–1911)
- Rash Behari Bose (1886–1945)
- Horace Capron (1804–1885), 1884
- Chang Yung-fa (1927–2016), 2012
- Martha Layne Collins (1936–2025), 2009
- Rita R. Colwell (1934–), 2005
- William Douglas Crowder, 2008
- Gerald Curtis, 2005
- Marzuki Darusman, 2017
- Joseph Dimsdale (1849–1902), 1902
- Kiin Donarudo, 1993
- Jonathan M. Dorfan (1947–), 2017
- Hugh Elles (1880–1945)
- José Manuel Entrecanales, 2018
- Predrag Filipov, 2019
- Bill Frenzel, 2000
- Kuntoro Mangkusubroto (1947–), 2023
- Thamir Ghadhban (1945–), 2016
- Thomas Blake Glover (1838–1911), 1908
- Richard N. Haass (1951–), 2023
- William Reginald Hall (1870–1943)
- Lionel Halsey (1872–1946)
- Airlangga Hartarto, 2025
- Mazie Hirono (1947–), 2021
- Ho Mei-yueh (1951–), 2021
- Kazuo Ishiguro (1954-), 2018
- Mohamed Nouri Jouini, (2019)
- Arifin Tasrif (1953–), 2023
- Onkar Singh Kanwar (1942–), 2018
- Donald Keene (1922–2019), 1973
- Michael Kirby, 2017
- David C. Knapp, (1927–2010)
- Tommy Koh, 2009
- Jeffrey Koo, 2012
- George Trumbull Ladd (1842–1921)
- Cecil Lambert (1864–1928)
- Dan Larhammar (1956–), 2022
- Tsung-Dao Lee 2007
- Charles LeGendre (1830–1899), 1874
- Wassily Leontief (1905–1999), 1985
- Lilia B. de Lima, 2006
- Abdul Gafoor Mahmud (1934-), 2017
- William Flynn Martin, 2018
- William R. Merz, 2021
- Ignasius Jonan (1963–), 2022
- Connie Morella (1931–), 2016
- Riccardo Muti, 2016
- Thottuvelil Krishna Pillai Ayappan Nair 2015
- Hideyo Noguchi (1876–1928), 1928
- John Randles (1875–1945)
- Chintamani Nagesa Ramachandra Rao, 2015
- Rein Raud, 2011
- J. Peter Ricketts, 2022
- Johannis de Rijke (1842–1913)
- Wilbur L. Ross (1937–), 2015
- Vsevolod Rudnev (1855–1913), 1907
- Saisho Atsushi, 1887
- Shyam Saran, 2019
- Jacob Schiff (1847–1920), 1907
- William Francis Sempill (1893–1965)
- N. K. Singh (2016)
- E. Sreedharan (1932–), 2013
- Wendell M. Stanley (1904–1971), 1966
- Michael Ira Sovern 2003
- Sayidiman Suryohadiprojo (1927–2021), 2012
- Washington SyCip, 2017
- Henry W. Taft (1859–1945), 1929
- Frederick Charles Tudor Tudor (1863–1946)
- Charles Vaughan-Lee (1867–1928)
- John Waldron (1909–1975) 1971
- Bryon Wilfert (1952–), 2011
- Ernst-Ludwig Winnacker (1941–), 2009
- Richard J. Wood, 2010
- Kenkichi Yabashi (1869–1927), 1927
- Philip Yeo (1946–), 2007
- Lim Jock Seng, 2013
- Hamdillah Abdul Wahab, 2013
- Nor Jeludin, 2020
- Badr bin Saud al Busaidi, 2021
- Lim Jock Hoi, 2024
- Maj. Gen. Aung San, May 1943
- Abang Abdul Rahman Zohari bin Abang Openg, 2025
- Jonathan Dorfan, (1947-), 2017

=== 3rd Class, Gold Rays with Neck Ribbon ===

- Craig Agena (1960–), 2014
- John F. Aiso (1909–1987), 1985
- Giorgio Amitrano (1957–), 2020 (ceremony held in 2022)
- Abul Barkat (1954–), 2022
- William Sturgis Bigelow (1850–1926), 1909
- Edmund Blunden (1896–1974), 1963
- Richard Bowring (1947–), 2013
- Ben Nighthorse Campbell (1933–), 2011
- Kent E. Calder, 2014
- Ion Caramitru, 2017
- Kirsti Koch Christensen, 2006
- Albert Diamond Cohen, 2011
- Edwin Cranston, 2009
- Rust Macpherson Deming, 2013
- Rudy Demotte, 2016
- Ronald P. Dore
- Peter Drysdale, 2001
- Clint Eastwood, 2009
- Gustave Eiffel (1832–1923)
- Mahdi Elmandjra, 1986
- Elizabeth Esteve-Coll (1938–2024), 2005
- Jack Fujimoto, 2011
- Tsuneari Fukuda (1912–1994), 1986
- Robert Garfias, 2005
- Carol Gluck, 2006
- William Elliot Griffis (1843–1928), 1926
- David A. Gross, 2021
- Moto Hagio, 2022
- Percival Hall-Thompson (1874–1950)
- Jochem P. Hanse, 2007
- Helen Hardacre, 2018
- James Curtis Hepburn (1815–1911)
- Judit Hidasi, 2005
- Yanosuke Hirai (1902–1986), 1972
- Irene Hirano (1948–2020), 2020
- John Charles Hoad (1856–1911), 1906
- Jiro Horikoshi (1903–1982), 1973
- Bill Hosokawa (1915–2007), 1987
- John Howes, (1924–2017), 2003
- Robert Huey, 2019
- Keiichi Ishizaka (1945–2016), 2015
- Muhammad Nurul Islam (1943–), 2012
- Jean-François Jarrige (1940–2014)
- Kanō Jigorō (1860–1938)
- Peter Jost (1921–2016), 2011
- Otto Hermann Kahn (1867–1934)
- Kusuma Karunaratne (1940–)
- Harue Kitamura, 2004
- Peter Kornicki (1950–), 2018
- George Koshi c. 1960
- George Trumbull Ladd (1842–1921)
- Miles Wedderburn Lampson (1880–1964)
- Yves Leterme, 2016
- Norman Macrae (1923–2010), 1988
- Paul Magnette, 2016
- William P. Malm, 2020
- Mike Masaoka, 1968
- Kyuzo Mifune (1883–1965), 1964
- John Milne (1850–1913)
- Earl Miner (1926–2004)
- Edwin McClellan (1925–2009), 1998
- Ian Nish, 1991
- Setsuko Matsunaga Nishi, 2009
- John O'Conor, 2011
- Peter O'Malley, 2015
- Dennis M. Ogawa, 2016
- Taiichi Ohno, 1982
- Janusz Onyszkiewicz, 2019
- Piotr Paleczny, 2019
- Henry Spencer Palmer (1838–1893), 1887
- Cecil Hobart Peabody (1855-1934), 1915
- T.J. Pempel, 2022
- Susan Pharr, 2008
- Umberto Pineschi, 2009
- Lee Poh Ping, 2010
- John Powles, 2008
- Pyle, Kenneth B. 1999
- John Mark Ramseyer, 2018
- Sadia Rashid, 2019
- Dzulkifli Abdul Razak, 2019
- Jacob Raz, 2006
- Robert Ridgway, 1929
- Rustum Roy, 2002
- David Rowe-Beddoe, 2008
- David Russell, 2010
- Güler Sabancı, 2024
- Isaac Shapiro (1931–), 2006
- David Bowman Schneder, 1936
- Edward Seidensticker, 1975
- Go Seigen aka Wu Qing Yuan (1914–2014), 1987
- Henry Delp Styer, 1922
- William Forbes-Sempill
- Shinichi Suzuki (1898–1998), c. 1970
- Jeanette Takamura, 2009
- Ichimatsu Tanaka (1895–1983), 1967
- Tadao Tannaka (1908–1986), 1980
- Patrick Lennox Tierney, 2007
- Royall Tyler, 2008
- T. Wayland Vaughan (1870–1952), 1940
- Rudi Vervoort, 2016
- Andrzej Wajda, 1995
- Willy Vande Walle, 2006
- Sam Walsh, 2021
- R.J. Zwi Werblowsky, 2009
- Charles Wolf, Jr, 2007
- Lydia Yu-Jose, 2012
- Jan van Zanen, 2016
- Doug Butterworth, 2019
- Yoshiyuki Tomino, 2026

=== 4th Class, Gold Rays with Rosette ===

- Hank Aaron (1934–2021), 2016
- Ferran Adrià (1952–), 2015
- Toshiko Akiyoshi (1929–), 2004
- Boris Akunin (1956–), 2009
- Shusaku Arakawa (1936–2010), 2010
- Martha Argerich (1941–), 2005
- Charles Aznavour (1924–2018), 2018
- Noboru Baba (1927–2001), 2001
- Henry Pike Bowie (1848–1920), 1909
- James R. Brandon, 1994
- William Penn Brooks, 1888
- Bobby Charlton, 2012
- David Cope, 2012
- William Elliot Griffis (1843–1928), 1907
- Kenji Ekuan (1925–2015), 2000
- Atsuko Toko Fish 2018
- Fujiko Fujio A (1934–), 2008
- Mohammad Hatta (1902–1980), 1943
- Reiko Hayama (1933–2025), 2011
- Steven Heine (1950–), 2007
- Asao Hirano (1926–2019), 2001
- Terumasa Hino (1942–), 2019
- Joe Hisaishi, 2023
- Jean-Claude Hollerich (1958-), 2019
- William Imbrie (1845–1928), 1909
- Iskandar Jalil, 2015
- Rena Kanokogi (1935–2009), 2008
- Gō Katō (1938–2018), 2008
- Kihachirō Kawamoto (1925–2010), 1995
- George Kerr (1937–), 2010
- Keisuke Kinoshita (1912–1998), 1984
- Bertrand Kobayashi (1944–), 2026
- Joy Kogawa (1935–), 2010
- Sachi Koto (1951–), 2021
- Włodzimierz Kwieciński (1955–), 2012
- Tommy Lasorda (1927–2021), 2008
- Liao I-chiu (1936–), 2014
- Leiji Matsumoto, 2010
- Hazel McCallion, 2014
- Rokusaburo Michiba, 2007
- Frank A. Miller, 1929
- Nobuko Miyamoto, 2022
- Shiro Floyd Mori, 2012
- Raymond Moriyama (1929–2023), 2003
- Kent Nagano, 2008
- Masaya Nakamura (1925–2017), 2007
- Olivia Newton-John (1948–2022), 2021
- Alan Nishio (1945-2023), 2016
- Hideyo Noguchi (1876–1928), 1915
- Gustaf Wilhelm Olson (1876-1955), 1955
- David Ono, 2022
- Ivica Osim, 2016
- Daniel Ost, 2015
- Kenneth Oye, 2018
- Edwina Palmer, 2018
- Donald Richie, 2005
- Takao Saito, 2010
- Sanpei Satō, 2006
- David Bowman Schneder, 1917
- Frederik L. Schodt, 2009
- Peter Schreier, 2019
- Manmohan Singh (pulmonologist), 2007
- George Shima (1864–1926)
- Tatsuzo Shimaoka (1919–2007), 1999
- Setsuko Shinoda (1955–), 2020
- Joseph Bower Siddall (1840–1904), 1909
- Dragan Stojković (1965–), 2015
- Sukarno (1901–1970), 1943
- Koichi Sugiyama (1931–2021), 2018
- Hiroshi Tachi (1950–), 2020
- George Takei (1937–), 2004
- Takeo Okuno (1926–1997), 1997
- Brian Taniguchi (1951–), 2023
- Kip Tokuda (1946–2013), 2012
- Masanobu Tsuji (1902–1961), 1942
- George Tsutakawa (1910–1997), 1981
- Morihei Ueshiba (1883–1969), 1964
- Moriteru Ueshiba (1951-), 2025
- H. Paul Varley (1931–2015), 1966
- The Ventures, 2010
- Sadao Watanabe (1933–), 2005
- Tetsuya Watari (1941–2020), 2013
- William Scott Wilson (1944–), 2015
- Teruaki Yamagishi (1934–), 2008

=== 5th Class, Gold and Silver Rays ===

- Dick Beyer (1930–2019), 2017
- Branislav Crnogorac (1952–), 2020
- Frances Hashimoto (1943–2012), 2012
- Abdullah Ibrahim (1934–2016), 2020.
- Daniela Kaneva (1938–2025), 2011
- Jan Kowalewski (1892–1965), 1923
- Lori Matsukawa (1956–), 2022
- Soleiman Mehdizadeh (1955–), 2012
- Kenzo Mori (1914–2007), 2007
- Shōshin Nagamine (1907–1997), 1982
- Shūgorō Nakazato (1920–2016), 2007
- Kiyoshi Nishiyama (1893–1983), 1977
- Steere Noda (1892–1986), 1968
- Hironori Ōtsuka (1892–1982), 1966
- Sumitra Peries (1934–2023), 2021
- Vincenzo Ragusa (1841–1927), 1884
- Antone Rosa (1855–1898), 1884
- Inés Sánchez (1931–2023), 2012
- Pabitra Sarkar (1937– ), 2019
- Doreen Simmons (1932–2018), 2017
- Yosihiko H. Sinoto (1924–2017), 1995
- Chris Spearman, 2020
- James Takemori (1926–2015), 2004
- Seiichi Tanaka (1968– ), 2013
- Alicia Terada (1956– ), 2017
- Rudolf Teusler (1876–1934)
- Ted Tsukiyama (1920–2019), 2001
- Ronald Stewart Watt (1947– ), 2010
- William Wheeler (1851–1932), 1924
- Shuji Yagi (Shuho Bon Yagi), 2019
- Akira Yoshizawa (1911–2005), 1983

=== 6th Class, Silver Rays ===

- Yun Chi-sung (1875–1936), 1905
- Henry Hajimu Fujii (1886–1976), 1971
- Bolesław Orliński (1899–1992), 1926
- Shigetaka Sasaki (1903–1993), 1986

=== 7th Class, Green Paulownia Leaves Medal ===

In 2003, the 7th and 8th levels – named for leaves of the Paulownia tree, long used as a mon (emblem) for the highest levels of Japanese society – were moved to a new and distinct order, the single-class Order of the Paulownia Flowers.

=== 8th Class, white Paulownia Leaves Medal ===

In 2003, the 7th and 8th levels – named for leaves of the Paulownia tree, long used as a mon (emblem) for the highest levels of Japanese society – were moved to a new and distinct order, the single-class Order of the Paulownia Flowers.

=== Class unknown ===

- Aung San (1915–1947)
- Edvard Beneš (1884–1948), 1928
- Jane Birkin (1947–2023), 2018
- Ralph T. Browning (1941–2018)
- Ernesto Burzagli (1873–1944), 1906
- Henry Clews (Awarded 1908)
- Albert M. Craig (1988)
- William Theodore de Bary (1993)
- Robert Lawrence Eichelberger (1886–1961)
- Alfred John Ellis (1915–2020), 1989
- Granville Roland Fortescue (1875–1952)
- Frank B. Gibney, Sr. (1924–2006), 1976
- Louis Grondijs (1878–1961)
- Hosoya Jūdayū (1840–1907)
- Ibrahim of Johor (1873–1959)
- Isao Kataoka (1936–2015), 2008
- Cargill Gilston Knott (1856–1922), 1891
- George Frederick Kunz (1856–1932)
- Charles de Limburg Stirum (1906–1989)
- Henryk Lipszyc, 1992
- Lionel W. McKenzie (1995)
- George F. Morrison (1867–1943)
- Musa Ghiatuddin Riayat Shah of Selangor, Sultan of Selangor (1893–1955)
- Ozaki Yukio (1858–1954)
- Godfrey Paine (1871–1932), 1918
- Hugh Talbot Patrick 1994
- Rossiter W. Raymond (1840–1918)
- Takamine Hideo (1854–1910)
- James R. Wasson (1847–1923), 1874
- Franciszek Ziejka
- Ivan Ivanovich Zarubin (1822–1902), 1881
- Kisshomaru Ueshiba (1921–1999), ?

== See also ==
- Order of merit: A list of orders by various states
- Systems of other states:
  - Order of Civil Merit (Korea)
  - Order of Chula Chom Klao and Order of the White Elephant (Thailand)
  - Order of St. Michael and St. George (UK)
  - Legion of Honour (France)
  - Order of Merit of the Federal Republic of Germany (Grand Merit Cross, Merit Cross and Merit Medal equivalents)
  - Order "For Merit to the Fatherland" (Russia)
  - Order of Isabella the Catholic (Spain)
  - Order of Merit of the Italian Republic
  - Hungarian Order of Merit
  - Decoration of Honour for Services to the Republic of Austria (Grand Decoration in Gold with Sash, in Gold with Star, in Gold, Grand Decoration of Honour, Decoration of Honour in Gold, Decoration of Merit in Gold)
  - Order of Prince Henry (Portugal)
