= Invest Sweden =

Swedish government agency (1995–2010)

Invest Sweden (Swedish: Myndigheten för utländska investeringar i Sverige), a.k.a. Invest in Sweden Agency (Swedish: Delegationen för Utländska Investeringar i Sverige) 1995–2010, was a Swedish government agency organised under the Minister for Foreign Affairs, promoting business and investment opportunities in Sweden to foreign investors. The objective was to stimulate an increased flow of foreign direct investment to Sweden.

In 2013, the agency was merged with the organisation Swedish Trade Council, to form a new organisation named Business Sweden.
