= Gustaf Wilhelm Olson =

Swedish American businessman (1876 - 1955)

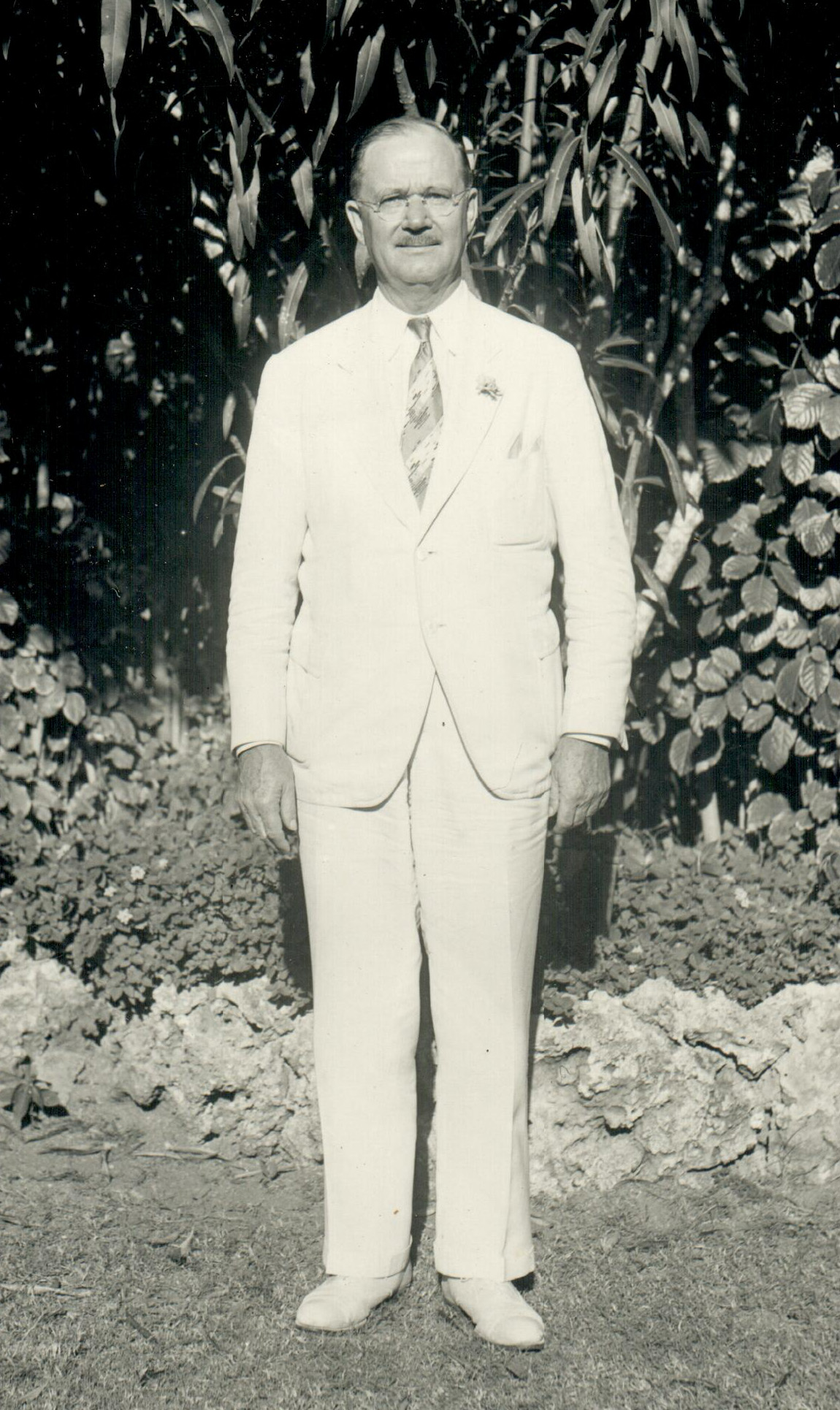
- Photo taken by his son Goodwin Wendell Olson c. 1940
- Born: 7 April 1876; Härlunda Parish, Kronoberg County, Småland, Sweden
- Died: 19 December 1955 (aged 79); Stockholm, Sweden

Gustaf Wilhelm Olson (7 April 1876 - 19 December 1955) was a Swedish American businessman, politician, hospital administrator and consul for Sweden in America.

== Early life ==
Olson was born 7 April 1876 to Sven and Sissa (Trulsdotter) Olson in the Härlunda Parish, Kronoberg County, Småland, Sweden. In 1888, at age 12, he travelled to the United States with his father and brother where they settled in Vasa, Minnesota for a year and a half before moving to Minneapolis in the fall of 1889. On 18 June 1898, at age 22, Olson was naturalized as a US citizen.

== Career ==
=== Printing ===
In the fall of 1894, in partnership with Albert Sjostrand, under the firm name of Olson & Sjostrand, Olson started a job printing office. In 1898 he bought out his partner's interest and continued the business alone. In 1899 Olson unfortunately had a severe illness, during which the business ran down to such an extent that he had to sell out the stock.

Olson then entered the employ of Hahn & Harmon, printers, and remained as foreman of their jobbing office from 1899 until 1902, when he accepted a position as advertising manager with the Minnesota Stats Tidning, in St. Paul. but at the end of a year was offered a better position with Hahn & Harmon, with whom he was again associated, this time remaining from February, 1903, until January, 1904. Olson then started a business of his own as head of the firm of G. W. Olson & Company, and five months later, on May 1, 1904, his company became consolidated with the firm of Hahn & Harmon, and was incorporated under the name of "Hahn & Harmon Company," of which Mr. Olson was a member of the directorate and vice-president.

In 1897 he was commissioned as correspondent for a leading printing trades journal at the Industrial Exposition at Stockholm.

=== Hospital Administration ===
- Superintendent, Swedish Hospital at Minneapolis
- Superintendent, California Lutheren Hospital at Los Angeles
- Assistant Superintendent, Los Angeles County General Hospital
- Administrator, Queen's Hospital in Honolulu

== Politics ==
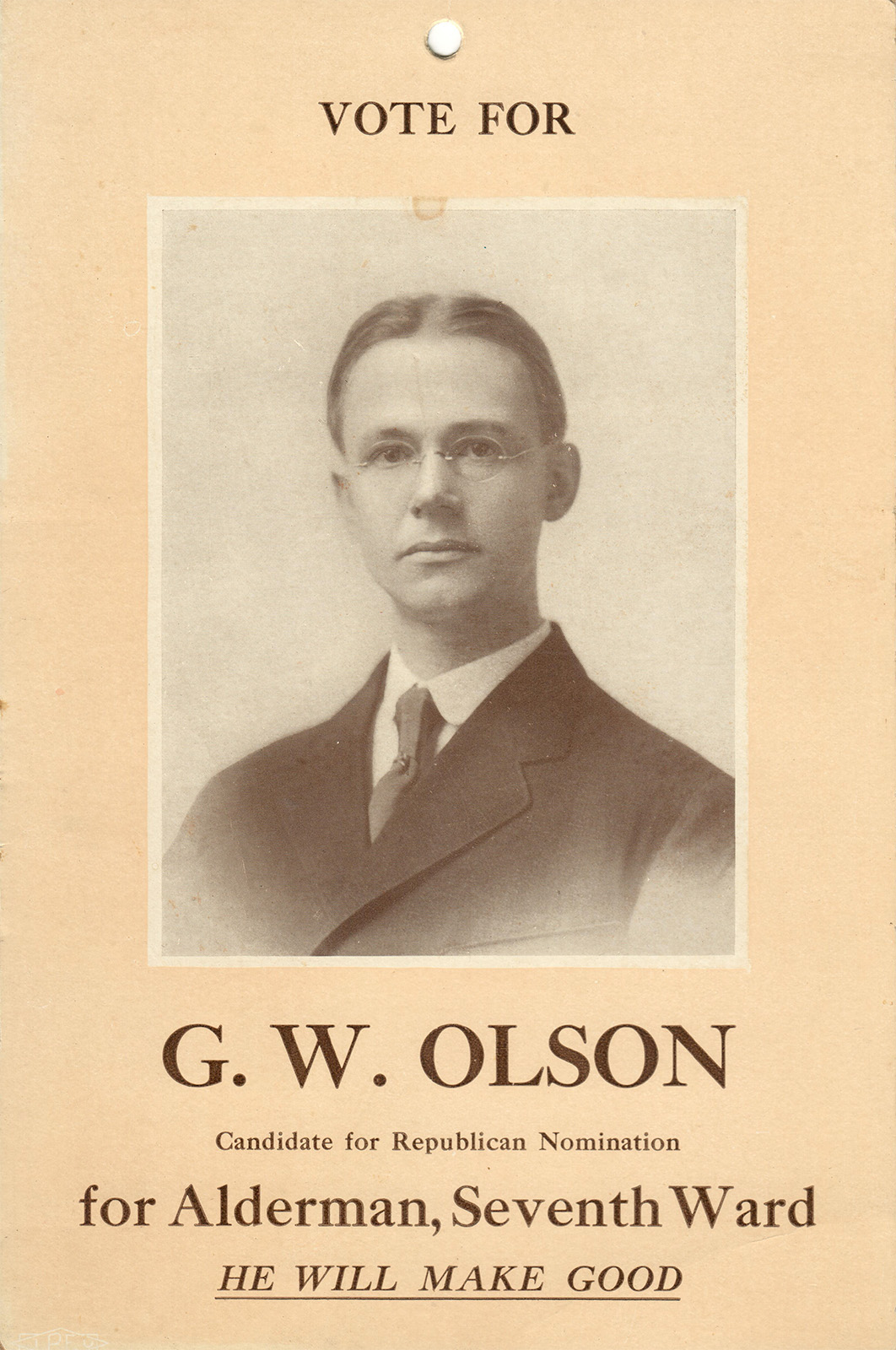
G.W. Olson for Alderman Seventh Ward

In 1908 Olson was a candidate for the Republican nomination for alderman in Minneapolis from the Seventh ward, and at the primaries received a handsome majority of the votes cast, but was defeated at the polls by the small majority of fifteen votes.

== Public Service ==
- Vice Consul for Sweden at Los Angeles, California, 1931
- Vice Consul for Sweden at Honolulu, Hawaii, 1941
- Consul for Sweden at Honolulu, Hawaii, 1949

== Awards ==
On 29 August 1955, Gustaf was awarded the Order of the Rising Sun, 4th Class from Japan for his work during World War II in protecting Japanese interests in Hawaii.

== Personal life ==
Gustaf married Tillie Olson in 1899 and together had 4 children. He became a widower after Tillie died 18 September 1931.

Gustaf was later remarried to Anice Hummel on 6 December 1941 in Honolulu, HI, the evening before the attack on Pearl Harbor.

== Death ==
Gustaf and his wife left Honolulu, HI on 4 September 1955 to visit Sweden with the intention of staying for a year before returning to Hawaii. Shortly after arriving to Sweden, Gustaf experienced health complications and died on 19 December 1955.
