= Włodzimierz Kwieciński =

Polish martial arts coach

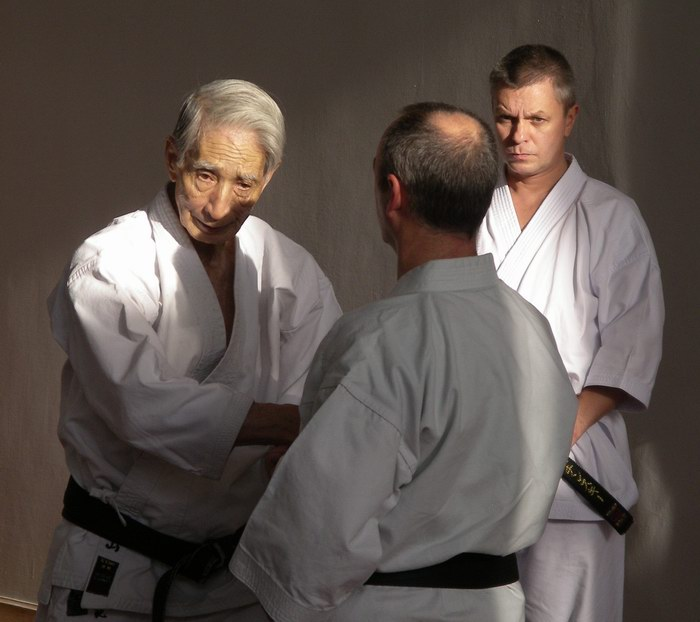
Włodzimierz Kwieciński (right) with Hidetaka Nishiyama (left) and Nelson Carrion (middle) at a karate seminar in 2006

Włodzimierz Kwieciński M.D. (9 DAN; born 3 July 1955) is a Polish karateka. He started practising karate in 1970 and is a pioneer of traditional karate.

== Biography ==
Kwieciński was born in Łódź, Poland. He graduated the Military Medical Academy (later he worked as the Polish Air Force medical doctor) and the Academy of Physical Education in Krakow graduated with specialization karate coach.

On 4 April 2015, in Chokokuji Soto Zen Temple in Tokyo (Japan), Włodzimierz Kwieciński reached the 8 DAN.

He is president of the World Traditional Karate-Do Fedearation (WTKF), former International Traditional Karate Federation (ITKF) seated in Geneva (Switzerland). He is also founder and chairman of the Traditional Karate Federation of Poland (TKFP). TKFP has got about 200 member clubs and sections in all regions of Poland. Nowadays it is estimated that in Poland there are approx. 30 thousands people practicing traditional karate.

== Achievements ==
For 20 years Włodzimierz Kwieciński has been a student of the late Sensei Hidetaka Nishiyama – founder and first chairman of the International Traditional Karate Federation ITKF, co-founder of the Japan Karate Association (JKA).

He is a coach of the national team of Poland and author of all their successes. Since 1992 until 2015 Polish national team members won 615 medals at the World and the European Championships; as many as 237 times they won championship titles, becoming one of the most highly recognized national team in the world.

Włodzimierz Kwieciński was a chairman of the Organizing Committee of many international tournaments and championships held in Poland:

- World Championships (Łódź – 2012; Pruszków – Warsaw – 1998; Kraków – 2016)
- three times the European championships (Rzeszów – 2006; Łódź – 1992, 1999)
- several times the World Cup
- several times the European Cup

== Projects ==
Włodzimierz Kwieciński – a promoter of karate culture and budo philosophy by predilection, is an originator of the investment – Japanese Martial Arts and Sports Centre "Dojo – Stara Wieś" located in the village Stara Wieś, Poland.

The Dojo project started in 2003. The first day featured personal participation of Sensei Hidetaka Nishiyama, founder and first chairman of the International Traditional Karate Federation (ITKF), the "spiritual father" and patron of this extraordinary idea. The centre was officially opened six years letter (on October 10, 2009) by the former President of Poland Lech Wałęsa, a man who had, throughout his life, followed the great values common to all people: peace, respect and understanding.

Dojo – Stara Wieś was designed and built in accordance with the principles of Japanese architecture amid the Polish landscape and is unique on a world scale. It is the world's largest performance training centre for Far Eastern martial arts and sports. Dojo – Stara Wieś is the official training base of Poland's Traditional Karate National Team. It is also the centre of budo philosophy. It offers comprehensive training opportunities and a chance to experience the spirit, atmosphere and philosophy of Japanese martial arts to all visitors.

Włodzimierz Kwieciński was the originator of a nobly project under the name: "Solidarity Bridge – Polish holiday for children from Japan". Because of a long-term cooperation and intimate friendship between Japan and Poland, he couldn't stay indifferent to suffering and heavy toll caused by the earthquake and tsunami.

Traditional Karate Federation of Poland and Włodzimierz Kwieciński as a chairman invited 30 children from Japan to spend 2 weeks of summer holiday in Poland at the Japanese Martial Arts and Sports Centre "Dojo – Stara Wieś". They arranged for children a lot of activities and travels e.g. to Warsaw and Kraków.

A lot of organizations, foundations and individual people involved and offered their assistance to this nobly project. Lech Wałęsa – former president of Poland, Nobel Peace Prize recipient, consented to be the chairman of the Honorary Committee. Moreover, Jerzy Pomianowski – former ambassador of Poland in Japan agreed to act as Secretary of Honorary Committee. Radoslaw Sikorski – the former Polish Minister of Foreign Affairs took the Honorary Patronage of that undertaking. They also received support from Mrs. Jadwiga Maria Rodowicz – former ambassador of Poland in Tokyo, the local authorities and many others.

== Awards ==
- 2001 – Silver Cross of the Order of Merit of the Republic of Poland – state award conferred by the president of Republic of Poland – for his contribution to development of traditional karate and great coach achievements.
- 2003 – Fair Play 2002 award from the Polish Olympic Committee for “behaviour of the audience in accordance with a fair play rule during traditional karate youth competition as well as during the Traditional Karate World Cup in Warsaw and the European Cup in Lodz”. He was handed an award by Mrs. Irena Szewinska, seven times Olympic medalist, member of International Olympic Committee.
- 2003 – Fair Play award from the Polish Sport Confederation for excellent organization of traditional karate tournaments, ensuring security to all participants of the events and cultural behaviour of the audience during the Traditional Karate World Cup Prokom 2003. He was handed an award by Andrzej Krasnicki, president of Polish Olympic Committee.
- 2012 – Order of the Rising Sun, Gold Rays with Rosette bestowed by the Emperor of Japan for his steadfast dedication to his study and pursuit of the concept of Budo which lies at the heart of the traditional karate. He was handed an award by Makoto Yamanaka, ambassador of Japan to Poland.
- 2012 – Golden Cross of the Order of Merit of the Republic of Poland – state award conferred by the president of Republic of Poland – on the occasion of the 40th anniversary of traditional karate in Poland for his contribution to development of this martial art in Poland.
