= Swedish Trade Council =

The Swedish Trade Council (Swedish: Exportrådet, or Sveriges Exportråd) was an organisation formed after a parliamentary decision July 1, 1972, in cooperation between the Government of Sweden and representatives from the Swedish business community, through the Swedish Foreign Trade Association (Swedish: Sveriges Allmänna Utrikeshandelsförening). Its mission was to promote Swedish exports on behalf of the Swedish industry and government.

In 2013, the organisation was merged with the government agency Invest Sweden, to form a new organisation named Business Sweden.

Abroad, operations were organized into five regions: the Americas; Asia; Western Europe and Australia/New Zealand; Southern Europe, Africa and the Middle East, Central and Eastern Europe and Sub-Saharan Africa. In these regions, the Swedish Trade Council worked with Swedish and foreign consultants and cooperates closely with Swedish embassies, consulates and chambers of commerce.
