= Rafał Kwieciński =

Polish footballer (born 1975)

Personal information
- Date of birth: 18 June 1975 (age 51)
- Place of birth: Kraków, Poland
- Height: 1.70 m (5 ft 7 in)
- Position: Midfielder

Youth career
- Proszowianka Proszowice

Senior career*
Years	Team	Apps	(Gls)
1993–1995	Hutnik Kraków	11	(0)
1994	→ Dalin Myślenice (loan)		
1995–1998	Wawel Kraków		
1998–2002	Ruch Chorzów	73	(3)
2002	A.A.C. Eagles		
2002–2005	Hutnik Kraków		
2005–2006	Górnik Wieliczka		
2006–2007	EB/Streymur	50	(3)
2007–2008	Puszcza Niepołomice		
2009–2013	Victoria Kraków		
2017–2019	TKKF Kliny		
2019–2023	Victoria Kraków	59	(10)
- * Club domestic league appearances and goals

Rafał Kwieciński (born 18 June 1975) is a Polish footballer who plays as a midfielder.

== Honours ==
EB/Streymur

- Faroese Cup: 2007
