= Richard J. Wood =

Canadian mathematician

Richard J. Wood is a mathematician, and a former professor at Dalhousie University in Halifax, Nova Scotia, Canada. He graduated from McMaster University in 1972 with his M.Sc. and then later went on to do his Ph.D. at Dalhousie University. His primary research interests are in category theory and lattice theory.. He is, with co-authors Ernest F. Haeussler and Richard S. Paul, the author of Introductory Mathematical Analysis for Business, Economics and the Life and Social Sciences, which was for many years a standard mathematics textbook for business and economics majors.

== Publications ==
- Ernest F. Haeussler, Jr.; Richard S. Paul; Richard Wood (2005). Introductory Mathematical Analysis (for Business, Economics, and the Life and Social Sciences) (11th ed.). Pearson/Prentice Hall. ISBN 9780131139480.
