= Augustana Hospital =

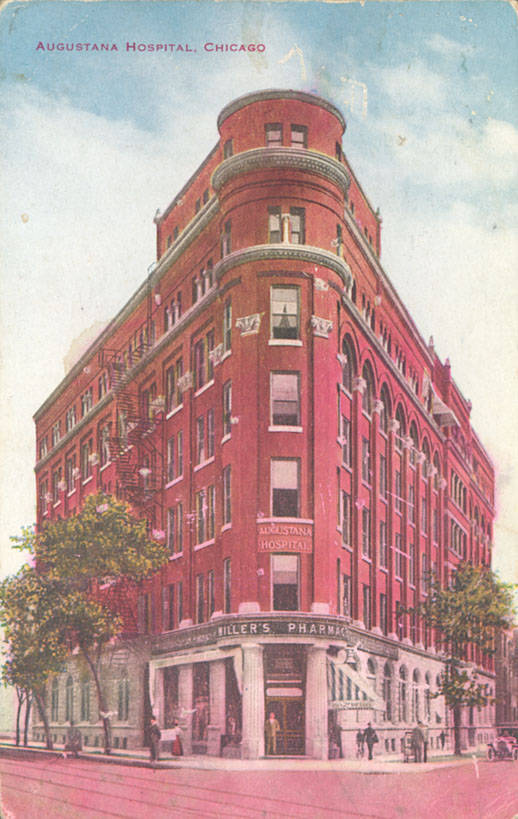

Geography
- Location: Chicago, Illinois, U.S.

Organisation
- Religious affiliation: Augustana Evangelical Lutheran Church

History
- Former names: Deaconess Institution of the Swedish Evangelical Lutheran Church; Augustana Hospital and Deaconess Institution
- Opened: 1882
- Closed: Merged with Advocate Lutheran General Hospital, 1987

Augustana Hospital (also known as Deaconess Institution of the Swedish Evangelical Lutheran Church and Augustana Hospital and Deaconess Institution) was a hospital in Chicago, Illinois. Affiliated with the Augustana Evangelical Lutheran Church, it was established in 1882. In 1987, Augustana Hospital merged with Advocate Lutheran General Hospital.

== Early history ==
The need of a Swedish hospital was early felt in Chicago, especially among the Swedish Lutherans. Rev. Erland Carlsson had not worked long in this field, when, realizing this need, he established a private hospital in rented quarters. This institution, especially designed for sick and ailing immigrants, later was merged with the hospital established by Dr. William Passavant. The Great Chicago Fire put an end to this work for many years, but the idea of a Swedish Lutheran hospital was still kept active, and in 1880, the first step toward its realization was taken.

=== 1880-1882 ===
That year, Dr. Olof Olsson, in a newspaper article, suggested the establishment of a deaconess institute in connection with a hospital after the pattern of benevolent institutions in Germany, which country he had visited the year before. At Olsson's initiative, a meeting to discuss the matter was held at Moline, Illinois, November 6 of the same year. Then and there, a committee was chosen to pave the way for the enterprise. Its members were, Revs. O. Olsson, G. Peters, C. A. Evald, C. P. Rydholm, H. O. Lindeblad and Messrs. Peter Colseth and C. G. Thulin. They were instructed to make inquiries whether one or two deaconesses could be had from Stockholm, also to advise with Dr. Passavant and to negotiate with him for the use of part of certain grounds in Lake View given him for hospital purposes. Letters containing much encouragement and some cash, the latter amounting all in all to US$161, were received, but nothing further was accomplished up to February 1881, when the question was taken up at the meeting of the Illinois Conference in Chicago. There Rev. Carl Bernhard Leonard (C.B.L.) Boman was added to the committee and the cause was recommended to the congregations as worthy of their support. In October, the committee recommended Lake View as the location of the future institution and the conference at its next meeting authorized the purchase of property in that part of Chicago for a sum not to exceed US$10,000. But up to that time, little more than US$600 had been received. The committee was, therefore, given the alternative of starting hospital and deaconess work in rented quarters. Dr. Passavant, while warmly favoring the project, was constrained to decline the committee's request for the purchase of any part of the ground controlled by him, but he offered to erect thereon a building for US$5,000 that might be used for the purpose in question almost gratuitously for a period of five or ten years.

At this same conference meeting, held in February 1882, the first hospital board was elected, consisting of the following ministers: Erland Carlsson, O. Olsson, C. B. L. Boman, M. C. Ranseen; laymen, C. P. Holmberg, G. A. Bohman, John Erlander. At its first meeting, February 13, incorporation papers were made out and the following officers chosen: Erland Carlsson, president; O. Olsson, vice president; C. B. L. Boman, secretary, and C. P. Holmberg, treasurer. An executive committee was made up of the president, the treasurer and M. C. Ranseen, as the third member.

=== 1884-1889 ===
By New Year's, 1884, the hospital fund amounted to about US$1,200. With this money at their disposal, the board had instructions to open the institution shortly after the following conference meeting in February. On February 20, the board accepted an offer from Dr. Passavant to the effect that 4 acres (1.6 ha) of the hospital grounds in Lake View would be leased to them for twenty years and a building for US$5,000 to US$10,000 erected for their use, on condition that the new hospital would care for a reasonable proportion of the patients for whom Dr. Passavant had assumed responsibility. This agreement was sanctioned by the conference then in session. The constitution adopted at this same meeting named the new hospital "The Deaconess Institution of the Swedish Evangelical Lutheran Church", and defined its aim and purpose as follows: to care for the sick according to the Lord's command and to educate and train Christian nurses of the evangelical Lutheran faith.

In March 1884, the homestead of Rev. Carlsson, located at Lincoln and Cleveland avenues, was secured as a temporary hospital, at a rental of US$50 per month, Dr. Truman W. Miller was selected as chief physician, with two assistants, and on May 28, the institution was dedicated and formally opened, its first patient being a Miss Nibelius, who broke her leg in stepping off the street car which brought her to attend the dedication.

The Deaconess Institute of Stockholm having declined to send trained deaconesses, Hilda Carlsson was appointed matron and Lottie Freid assistant, the latter being in reality the first nurse at the institution. The new hospital had fifteen beds, which were soon occupied. All went well until October 29, when a disastrous fire occurred, stopping operations until the beginning of the year 1885, when the building was again occupied, repairs having been made and one story added to the building.

In September 1884, the conference rescinded its action with respect to Dr. Passavant's offer, which had been found unsatisfactory. At the next meeting, the corporate name was changed to "The Augustana Hospital and Deaconess Institution".

During its first year of activity, the hospital had a total of 35 patients, 18 being charity cases. Up to February 1885, the totals of income and expenditure for the hospital balanced at about US$3,500.

The Carlsson residence had been leased for three years from February 1885, but the conference was desirous that property should be purchased for the growing institution. In October 1886, in response to inquiries, Rev. Carlsson offered his property, consisting of the house and several lots at Lincoln and Cleveland avenues, for US$35,000, agreeing to donate US$1,000 of the amount. The offer was declined for the time being, and later four lots at Larrabee street and Belden avenue were purchased from a real estate agent for US$12,000. By a singular coincidence, the owner had simultaneously sold the same lots for US$12,500 to another party, who came into possession. After several other futile attempts to acquire a suitable site, Rev. Carlsson's offer was accepted in February 1887. He demanded payment in full by February 23, 1889, and, after having raised US$9,600 by means of a bazaar and other substantial amounts through subscriptions, and taken a loan of US$20,000, the directors in May 1890, paid off US$14,176, thereby settling in full with Rev. Erland Carlsson.

=== 1890-1893 ===
In the spring of 1890, Drs. Miller and his assistants, Chew and Woodworth, having resigned, Dr. Charles T. Parkes was chosen physician and surgeon in chief and Dr. A. J. Ochsner attending physician and surgeon. Upon the death of Dr. Parkes one year later, Dr. Ochsner became chief of the medical staff.

About this time, a donation of US$5,000 was received from Henry Melohn, a Dane, the gift being in memory of his Swedish wife, for whom a ward in the hospital was named. In 1890, 115 patients were cared for and the accounts for the year showed an income of US$8,326, exclusive of the US$20,000 loan, and an expenditure of US$31,072, including the last payment of the debt to Rev. Carlsson, US$6,500 on redeemed notes and US$5,400 to the bank.

In view of the urgent need of increasing the capacity of the institution, the conference in 1891 empowered the board to erect a new building and called upon the members of the churches to provide the means by liberal subscriptions. The result was a disappointment, only a few thousand dollars coming in through that channel.

The interest of the women of the conference had been enlisted in this enterprise from the start, and about 1890, a ladies' board was organized in order to do more systematic and telling work in behalf of the institution and to superintend its household affairs. This board consisted of the following named ladies: Mrs. Emmy Evald, Mrs. M. C. Ranseen, Mrs. L. G. Abrahamson, Mrs. J. Blomgren, Mrs. E. Olson and Mrs. P. Johnson.

Another agency doing efficient service for the hospital was The Good Samaritan, a Swedish quarterly, published in its behalf.

Undismayed by the lack of means, the board through its building committee proceeded to have a new building erected. Ground was broken October 22, 1892, and on Feb 12 the following winter, the cornerstone was laid. The building, designed as a part of the future hospital structure, was to be 62 by 84 feet (19 m × 26 m), six stories high, with basement, built of iron, brick and stone, at a cost of US$85,000, and to provide room for 125 beds. A loan of US$50,000 was taken and through a bazaar held in April 1893, an additional US$5,749 was realized. In the early fall of 1893, the building was finished and its dedication took place September 17. At the end of the year, the total resources were US$122,390 and the liabilities US$65,825. The records for 1893 showed 267 patients, providing an income of US$5,668.

=== 1894-1902 ===
At this point, after the completion of the new building, a period of greater prosperity ensued. In 1895, the corresponding figures were 721 patients and an income of US$21,170, and the institution again began to be crowded for room. By housing the nurses in the old building and in rented quarters and by adding several wards, the capacity of the hospital was substantially increased. In 1897, the number of patients passed the thousand mark and three years later, it reached 1,500.

In 1894, a training school for nurses was opened, comprising a two years' course, and in 1896, the first class of trained nurses, eight in number, was graduated. This school heretofore has taken the place of the deaconess institute originally contemplated and implied in the corporate name.

In 1902, the board, being pressed for room to accommodate the ever-increasing number of patients, recommended the completion of the hospital building according to the original plan. With the sanction of the conference, the directors took the necessary steps but a bitter fight waged on those in control intervened, delaying building operations until late in the following year.

This fight ensued when in July 1902, Dr. M. C. Ranseen was called as superintendent of the institution and Rev. Henry O. Lindeblad, who had acted as chaplain and solicitor since January, 1898, resigned, protesting that he had been called to that position and had in fact served as superintendent. To his grievance was added that of Dr. C. O. Young, since January 1898, attending physician, who raised a variety of complaints. In December, a special conference meeting was held, at which these grievances were aired for days in heated and acrimonious debate. The outcome was that Rev. Lindeblad obtained a nominal vindication, but without reinstatement, Dr. Young's connection with the hospital was severed by the board and Dr. Ranseen resigned the superintendency before having fully entered upon his new duties. The struggle seemed to accentuate the fact that capable management on the part of the board and the efficient service of Dr. Ochsner, a surgeon of high repute, have been the chief factors in the upbuilding and maintenance of the institution.

=== 1903-1908 ===
The storm over, building operations were begun in August 1903, and about December 1, 1904, the annexed structure was ready for occupancy, giving the hospital a total capacity of 220 beds. The additional structure, completing the building as originally planned, was finished at a cost of about US$100,000.

In 1902, the debt on the old structure was wiped out, but on the new building, a debt of US$100,000 was incurred. It was gradually reduced.

In the natural course of development the Augustana Hospital has ceased to be an exclusive retreat for patients of a particular faith or nationality and become a hospital for the general public, pervaded, however, by the religious influences of the Swedish Lutheran Church.

In 1904, Rev. Dr. M. Wahlstrom, president of Gustavus Adolphus College, was called as superintendent. Having resigned his former position, he assumed his new office in September. With the duties of superintendent were combined those of chaplain of the institution.

In 1904, 1,739 patients were cared for and the income from paying patients was US$57,699. In 1905, after the completion of the building, the number of patients grew to 2,205 and the income from that source to US$80,394. The corresponding figures for the year 1906 were, 2,353 patients and cash from patients, US$96,752.

Since the founding of the hospital through 1908, its principal support, aside from current income, was derived from the following sources: church bazaars, more than US$35,000; donations and legacies about US$80,000. In the first quarter century of its existence, the total earnings of the hospital through the treatment and care of patients foot up to about US$500,000.
