= Eric Norelius =

Swedish-American minister (1833–1916)

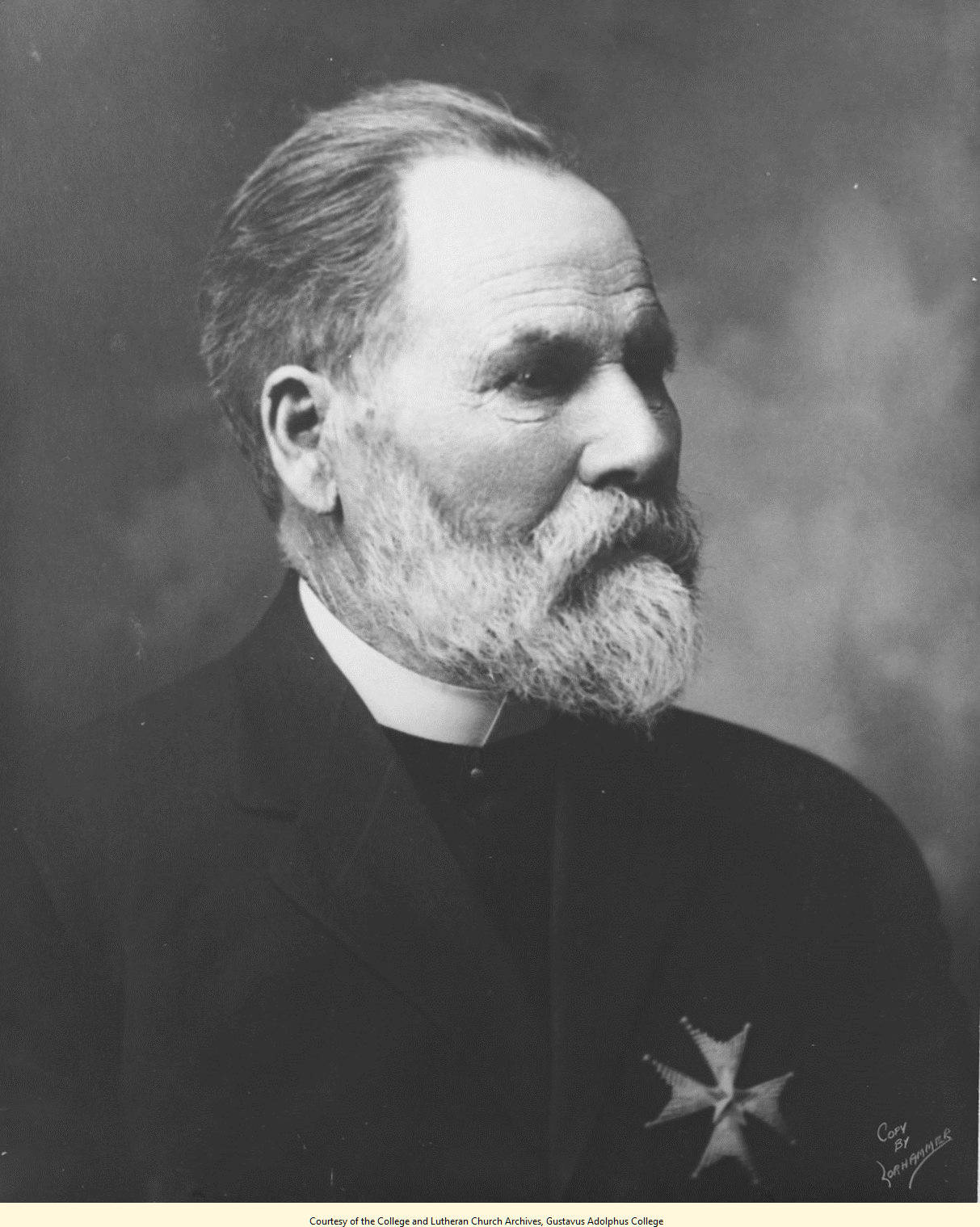
- Norelius with Polar Star Medal
- Born: Eric Norelius; 26 October 1833; Hassela, Helsingland, Sweden
- Died: 15 March 1916 (aged 82); Vasa, Minnesota, U.S.
- Occupations: clergyman; author; historiographer; church leader
- Church: Scandinavian Evangelical Lutheran Augustana Synod
- Ordained: 1855

Eric Norelius (26 October 1833 – 15 March 1916) was a Swedish-American Lutheran minister, church leader, and author.

== Background ==
Eric Norelius was born on 26 October 1833 in Norrbäck, Hassela parish, Sweden. He received his early education at Hudiksvall's general school. In 1850, at the age of 17, Norelius emigrated to the United States. In May 1851, he accompanied Lars Paul Esbjörn on a visit to William Morton Reynolds, president of the newly renamed Capital University at Columbus, Ohio, and stayed on to become a student there, with assistance from Esbjörn. After four years of studying, Norelius was ordained in 1855.

== Career ==
Norelius moved to the newly formed congregations in Red Wing, and Vasa, Minnesota, in 1856. In 1858, he was called to serve the Swedish Lutheran congregation in Attica, Indiana. In 1863, he was called back to the Vasa and Red Wing congregations in Goodhue County.

Lutheran Social Service of Minnesota traces its history to 1865 when Norelius and his congregation took in four orphaned immigrant children and later opened Vasa Lutheran Home for Children. The Vasa Children's Home was the first orphan home established by Swedish Lutherans in Minnesota.

Norelius was one of the founders of the Augustana Synod, and he served as its president between 1870–1881 and 1901–1910. Norelius was also the founder and often president of the Lutheran Minnesota Conference of Augustana Synod, and he initiated Minnesota Elementar Skola, a predecessor of Gustavus Adolphus College.

Norelius was also active in the publishing field and began the publishing of Minnesota Posten from 1857–1858, which merged with Hemlandet. Norelius jointly published and edited Svensk Luthersk Tidskrift, which became Skaffaren after the first year of existence. He edited Missionären from 1870–1871. Norelius was listed as editor-in-chief of Skaffaren until 1882. He was also the editor of Augustana for a brief period of time and the synod calendar Korsbaneret. From 1899 until 1909, he was editor or co-editor of Tidskrift för svensk evangelisk luthersk kyrkohistoria i Amerika, later called The Augustana Theological Quarterly.

The last years of his life were spent researching and writing the history of the synod and the Swedish migration to and settlement in America. He published Vasa illustrata (1905) on the history of his congregation in Vasa, The history of the Swedish Lutheran congregations and the Swedish-Americans (1890) (Swedish: De svenska lutherska församlingarnas och svensk-amerikanernas historia). He also wrote a biography of Tuve Hasselquist (1900). Eric Norelius' papers are contained in the Swenson Swedish Immigration Research Center located on the campus of Augustana College in Rock Island, Illinois, and in the College and Lutheran Church Archives at Gustavus Adolphus College in Saint Peter, Minnesota.

== Legacy ==
Gustavus Adolphus College honors the role of Norelius in the foundation of the college. The four narthexes of Christ Chapel honor the first four college presidents, including Norelius, founder of the college. Norelius Hall is named for him. The Eric Norelius Award for the Outstanding Administrative Employee is awarded annually by Gustavus Adolphus College. A commemorative bronze statue of Norelius was erected in 2015 in Lindström, Minnesota, alongside two additional statues of influential Swedish immigrants Joris-Pelle Per Anderson and Daniel Lindström. All three Swedes immigrated between 1851 and 1853 and are honored for their significant contributions to the city of Lindström and the state of Minnesota.
