= Lutheran School of Theology at Chicago =

Lutheran seminary

Coordinates: 41°47′52.4″N 87°35′09.7″W

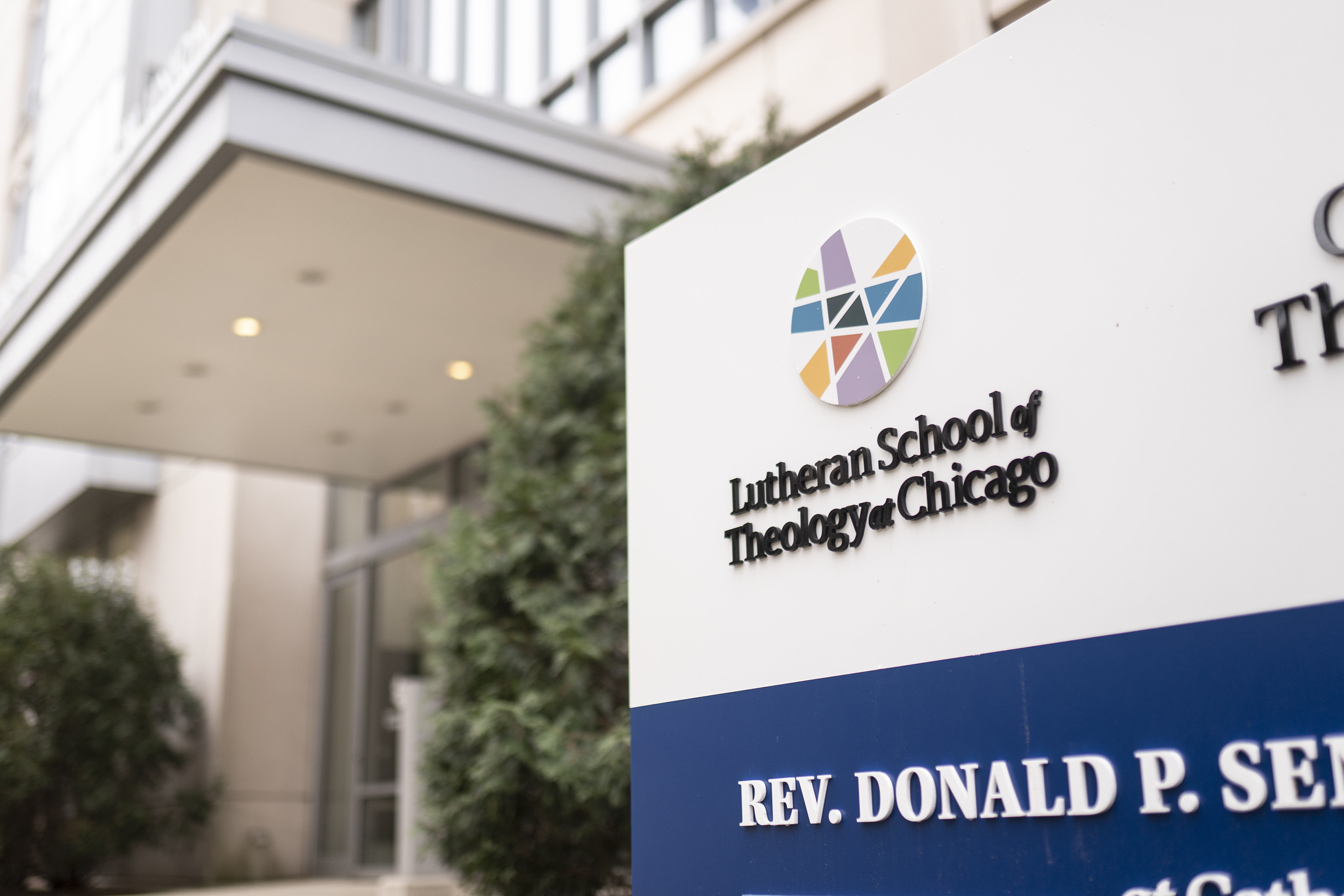
- Exterior Facade at 5416 S. Cornell Avenue
- Type: Seminary
- Established: September 4, 1962; 64 years ago
- Affiliations: Evangelical Lutheran Church in America
- Endowment: $48.5 million (FY23)
- President: Shauna Hannan
- Faculty: 9
- Students: 121
- Location: Chicago, Illinois, United States
- Website: www.lstc.edu

The Lutheran School of Theology at Chicago (LSTC) is a seminary of the Evangelical Lutheran Church in America in Chicago, Illinois. LSTC is a member of the Association of Chicago Theological Schools (ACTS), a consortium of eleven area seminaries and theological schools. It shares the JKM Library and portions of its campus with McCormick Theological Seminary. LSTC is accredited by the Association of Theological Schools and regionally accredited by the Higher Learning Commission.

LSTC was formed in 1962 by the merger of the seminaries of the four church bodies that had merged to create the Lutheran Church in America (LCA). A fifth and sixth seminary joined the school in 1967 and 1987, respectively. LSTC moved to its Hyde Park campus in 1967. In June 2023, the campus relocated to 5416 South Cornell Avenue on the 4th floor of The James and Catherine Denny Center at Catholic Theological Union.

== History ==
The Lutheran School of Theology at Chicago was established on September 4, 1962, as the merger of four existing seminaries: the Augustana Evangelical Lutheran Church's Augustana Theological Seminary at Rock Island, Illinois, the American Evangelical Lutheran Church's Grand View Seminary at Des Moines, Iowa, the United Lutheran Church in America's (ULCA) Chicago Lutheran Theological Seminary at Maywood, Illinois, and the Finnish Evangelical Lutheran Church in America's Suomi Theological Seminary at Hancock, Michigan. The four church bodies had merged that year to form the Lutheran Church in America.

The new school initially used both the Rock Island and Maywood campuses while a larger campus in Chicago was constructed. The new campus in the Hyde Park neighborhood was opened on October 22, 1967. Three months before that, a fifth seminary, the Lutheran Church in America's Central Lutheran Theological Seminary at Fremont, Nebraska, merged into LSTC.

In 1975, McCormick Theological Seminary sold its campus in Lincoln Park and moved to the LSTC campus. It built a new building on the campus for its headquarters in 2003.

In 1983, ten faculty members of the Association of Evangelical Lutheran Church's Christ Seminary-Seminex in St. Louis, Missouri, relocated to the LSTC campus, and on December 31, 1987, the two seminaries merged as part of the process that created the Evangelical Lutheran Church in America.

On May 5, 2022, LSTC and McCormick announced the pending sale of their 3.5-acre (1.4 ha) campus bounded by 55th Street, Greenwood Avenue, University Avenue, and 54th Place to the University of Chicago, whose Hyde Park campus is across 55th Street from the seminaries. Under the proposal, the two seminaries will lease back part of the facilities for a limited period of time. Construction of new facilities on the fourth floor of the Catholic Theological Union at 5416 South Cornell Avenue began in spring 2023, with completion expected in October. The space includes four classrooms; two zoom rooms, 30 office spaces; a prayer and meditation room, a café, a chapel, and a grand hallway meeting space.

=== Augustana Theological Seminary ===
Starting in 1849, groups of Swedish immigrants began arriving in Illinois, forming congregations in Andover, Galesburg, Moline, and Chicago, and also in Iowa and Minnesota. These congregations associated themselves with the Synod of Northern Illinois, which included support of the Illinois State University, a Lutheran college in Springfield, Illinois. The Swedes, under pastor Lars Paul Esbjorn, became dissatisfied with the theology being taught at the institution and withdrew in 1860, resulting in the creation of both the Augustana Synod and of Augustana Theological Seminary. The latter was located in Chicago from 1860 to 1863, and then in Paxton from 1863 to 1875. In 1875, the seminary relocated to Rock Island,. New campus buildings were dedicated in 1923.

Originally the seminary had two departments, the preparatory and the theological. In 1869, the name of the school was changed to Augustana College and Theological Seminary. The college and seminary operated as two departments until September 1, 1948, when they were split into independent institutions: Augustana College and Augustana Theological Seminary. The seminary remained on the Rock Island campus until it merged into LSTC in 1962.

During its last decade, enrollment varied between 198 and 268. Almost all the pastors in the Augustana Synod were trained there. Presidents of the seminary were L. P. Esbjorn, T. N. Hasselquist, O. Olsen, G. Andreen, C. Bergendoff, and K. E. Mattson.

=== Chicago Lutheran Theological Seminary ===
Beginning in about 1869, the General Council of the Lutheran Church, especially at the urging of William A. Passavant of Pittsburgh, began considering establishment of an English language seminary in the Chicago area to train the pastors for the children of the German and Swedish immigrants. In 1874, Passavant bought a two-acre (0.81 ha) site in Lake View on the north edge of Chicago at his own expense, and worked to raise funds for construction. The General Council authorized the seminary in 1888, but did not provide any funding. Nevertheless, Passavant was able to open the school in 1891 with two professors and six students.

Industrial development of the Lake View area caused the seminary to move to a 16-acre (6.5 ha) site in Maywood, with ten buildings being erected immediately. A schism in 1920 due to a lack of church control over the seminary led to the dismissal of four faculty members and the loss of a substantial number of students. Enrollment remained low through the Great Depression and World War II, but by 1959 had increased to 302.

In 1957, the ULCA established its school of mission on the campus. In 1958, Suomi Theological Seminary became affiliated with Chicago Lutheran, as did the Grand View Seminary in 1960, both in preparation for the planned creation of the LCA and the LSTC.

Presidents of Chicago Lutheran included F. Weidner (to 1915), E. Krauss (1915–1920), J. E. Whitteker 1920–1926), L. F. Gruber (1926–1941), A. G. Weng (acting 1941), C. B. Foelsch (1942–1948), and Weng (1948–1962).

=== Grand View Seminary ===
The controversy over the doctrine of the Word and the teachings of N. F. S. Grundtvig resulted in a split among Danish Lutherans immigrants. The Grundtvigians established West Denmark Seminary near Luck, Wisconsin, in 1887, but it closed in 1892. Among the proposals made to replace that school was one in which the Danes would have a Danish professor at the Chicago Lutheran seminary, but that was rejected in favor of a school that would also be preparatory and focus on the Danish immigrants. Grand View College and Seminary was opened in 1896 in the namesake neighborhood of Des Moines, Iowa, and for 35 years the theological orientation of the school remained unchanged. In the 1930s, the transition from the Danish seminary model to the American one took place.

From 1896 to 1932, and again from 1942 to 1951, both the college and the seminary shared the same president. The separation of the college from the seminary began in 1950, although both institutions continued to share the campus and were under the same articles of incorporation and board of directors. Enrollment in the seminary was never large; in 1959 there were five faculty members and eight students. That same year the convention of American Evangelical Lutheran Church voted to move the seminary to the Chicago Lutheran campus in Maywood, and the two seminaries merged in 1960.

The presidents of the college and seminary were N. F. Gravengaard (1896–1897), R. R. Vestergaard (1897–1903), B. Nordentoft (1903–1910), E. Wagner (1910–1912), T. Knudsen (1912–1915), C. P. Hojbjerg (1915–1926), S. D. Rodholm (1926–1932), and J. Knudsen (1942–1951). Deans of the seminary only were S. D. Rodholm (1932–1942), J. Knudsen (1951–1953), and A. C. Kildegaard (1953–1960).

=== Suomi Theological Seminary ===
Suomi Theological Seminary was established by the Finnish Evangelical Lutheran Church in America (the Suomi Synod) in 1904 on the Hancock, Michigan, campus of the synod's Suomi College, which itself had been founded in 1896. Initially the curriculum consisted of two years of theological study, with seven years of classical education as a prerequisite. By 1910, this had increased three years of theological study with four years of high school as an enrollment requirement. In 1923, two years of college became a prerequisite, and in 1952, four years of college.

In 1952, efforts to separate the college and the seminary began. It was decided that it would be best if the seminary were no longer co-located with the college. In 1958, the seminary relocated to the Maywood campus of Chicago Lutheran, with a complete integration of the two seminaries curricula. However, Suomi Synod students were required to take courses on the history and theology of the Church of Finland. The merger of the seminaries was completed in 1960.

Suomi produced over 130 graduates during its 58 years in Hancock. The presidents of the seminary were J. K. Nikander, J. Wargelin, A. Lepisto, V. K. Nikander, C. J. Tamminen, B. Hillila, E. J. Isaac, and D. T. Halkila.

=== Central Lutheran Theological Seminary ===
Central Lutheran was founded by the General Synod of the Lutheran Church in 1893 in Atchison, Kansas, as the Western Theological Seminary. In 1910, control of the seminary was transferred to the board of trustees of Midland College, which was also located in Atchison at that time. The seminary was operated as a department of the college for almost 40 years. In 1919, the college and seminary relocated to Fremont, Nebraska. Despite serving an area from the Mississippi River to the Pacific Coast, the seminary had inadequate facilities and only a small faculty and student body, producing about 200 graduates in 50 years.

In 1949, the seminary became a separate institution and adopted the Central Lutheran name. The faculty increased, and enrollment went up 300% in the subsequent years. The ownership of the seminary eventually passed to the Central States, Iowa, Rocky Mountain, and Texas-Louisiana synods of the LCA. In 1967, Central Lutheran merged into LSTC.

Presidents of Central Lutheran at those times when it was not under the control of Midland were F. D. Altman (1895–1910) and E. B. Keisler (1950-??).

== See also ==
- Gruber Collection
- Zygon (journal)
