= Johannes Telleen =

Swedish American Lutheran pastor (1846–1933)

- Born: 3 August 1846; Knäred, Halland, Sweden
- Died: 26 November 1933 (aged 87); Duluth, Minnesota, USA
- Other name: John Telleen
- Education: Augustana College
- Occupation: Pastor
- Known for: Founding the newspaper Vestkusten
- Church: Augustana Evangelical Lutheran Church
- Ordained: 1872

Johannes (John) Telleen (3 August 1846 – 26 November 1933) was a Swedish American Lutheran pastor and newspaper founder.

== Biography ==
Johannes Telleen was born in Knäred, Halland, Sweden, the son of tenant farmer Sven Andersson and Nilla Jeppsdotter. With his parents and siblings, he emigrated to the United States in 1853. The family settled in Moline, Illinois, where Lars Paul Esbjörn – founder of Augustana Evangelical Lutheran Church and Augustana College – had started First Lutheran Church a few years prior. In 1856, they moved to Spoon Timber, Illinois. The family had little money while he was growing up so he helped out by doing farm work; he did not receive much education but devoured as much knowledge as he could.

He left home and began his studies at Augustana College and Seminary in 1864 and was supported financially through the efforts of Tuve Hasselquist. Telleen was ordained in 1872. His work was characterized by his focus on missions, which he also sought to emphasize in the denomination. He pushed for the denomination's use of English at a time when "he was the only one of the seventy-three clergymen of the Augustana Synod who could speak the English language satisfactorily, fluently, and forcibly". Telleen served in the Swedish Lutheran congregations in Des Moines and Denver from 1872 to 1882, founding Augustana Lutheran Church in Denver in 1880. He was Swedish vice-consul in Denver in 1883, and in 1882 founded Ebenezer Church (today herchurch) in San Francisco, the first permanent Swedish Lutheran congregation in California. He served as its pastor from 1883 to 1890. Telleen also contributed to the Lutheran Church's growth in Utah, founding Zion Swedish Lutheran Church in Salt Lake City in 1882.

From 1890 to 1892 he led the fundraising effort for Bethany College in Lindsborg, Kansas, and was then a field secretary for the Lutheran General Consulate's mission in India for about ten years. He was then pastor of Grace Lutheran Church in Minneapolis (1903–1905), taught at Hauge (Red Wing) Seminary (1905–1908), served at churches in Chicago and Benton Harbor, Michigan, and was field secretary of the church's mission to Puerto Rico. Telleen founded the organization Lutheran Orient Mission Society in 1910, which sent missionaries to Kurdistan; he was its first president.

In 1901 he received an honorary doctorate in theology from Thiel College in Greenville, Pennsylvania.

Telleen was a gifted speaker and a prolific writer. He was the founder of the Swedish-American newspaper Vestkusten, published in San Francisco, which he began publishing in October 1886 as a four-page monthly church publication called Ebenezer. The following year, its name was changed to Vestkusten. He soon transferred its operations to Alrik G. Spencer.

Telleen married Mary Anderson on 27 August 1873; they had six children. He was the father of S. Frederick Telleen, Chase National Bank vice-president; Leonard E. Telleen, circuit judge; Martin Telleen, American Banking Institute secretary; Signe, wife of Augustana Lutheran pastor A. Theodore Ekblad, and Ruth.

He retired in 1926 and spent the end of his life in the church-owned Lakeshore Lutheran Home in Duluth, Minnesota, where he had been a chaplain, and died there in 1933.
