= Erland Carlsson =

Swedish-American Lutheran minister (1822–1893)

Reverend Erland Carlsson
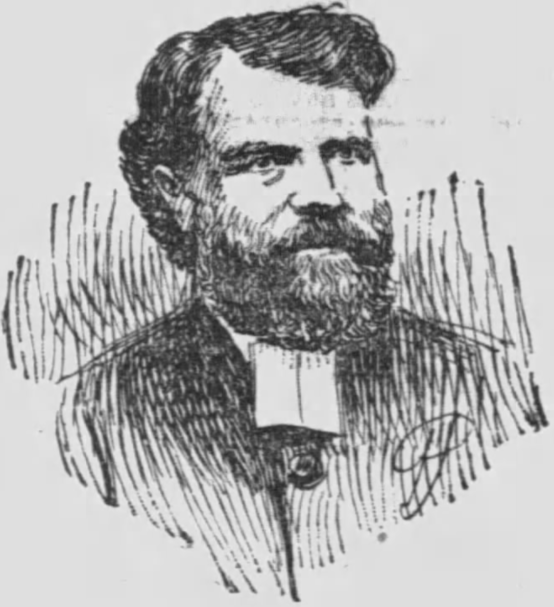
- Born: August 24, 1822; Älghult in Kronoberg, Sweden
- Died: October 19, 1893 (aged 71); Chicago, Illinois, US
- Education: University of Lund
- Spouse: Eva Charlotta Andersson (m. 1855)
- Children: 3, including Emmy Christine Evald

Ecclesiastical career
- Religion: Lutheran
- Church: Augustana Lutheran Synod
- Offices held: President of the Augustana Lutheran Synod

Erland Carlsson (August 24, 1822 – October 19, 1893) was a Swedish-American Lutheran minister. He was one of the founders and served as president of the Augustana Lutheran Synod.

== Background ==
Carlsson grew up in a pious home and experienced a crisis of faith as a teenager, which influenced him to become a priest. As a young prospective priest, Carlsson was influenced by Pietist priest Peter Lorenz Sellergren and the Läsare movement. He received his venia concionandi from Bishop Esaias Tegnér in 1844, allowing him to preach as a lay preacher. At a time when the Conventicle Act was still in effect, his revivalist preaching and activity in the temperance movement made church leaders such as Bishop Christopher Isac Heurlin suspicious.

== Career ==
In 1853, Tuve Hasselquist needed a minister for his newly founded Immanuel Lutheran Church in Chicago, Illinois, and requested Peter Fjellstedt, head of a mission school to send him one. Carlsson became his second choice after the first was unable. In 1853, Carlsson and a group of 176 emigrants, including a party of 17 members of his parish, departed for the United States from Kalmar. He became the minister of the Immanuel Lutheran Church, joining the Lutheran Synod of Northern Illinois, and helped many new Swedish immigrants. Carlsson soon started a Christian school and Sunday school. His provisional church constitution made an impact on the rest of the Swedish-American Lutheran Church, becoming a model for other congregations. He sought to give the church a middle ground in a low-church, Sellergren-like influence which still respected the church's traditional liturgical rite and vestments.

After a schism in the Northern Illinois Synod, the Scandinavian Evangelical Lutheran Augustana Synod in North America (later known as Augustana Lutheran Synod) was established in 1860. The organizing meeting was held at the Jefferson Prairie Settlement near Clinton, Wisconsin. A group of Swedish Lutheran pastors including Jonas Swensson, Lars Paul Esbjörn, Tuve Hasselquist, Eric Norelius and Carlsson pioneered development of the Augustana Lutheran Synod. Carlsson would serve as president of the Augustana Lutheran Synod from 1881 to 1888. He would also be the business manager of Augustana College and Seminary in Rock Island, Illinois, as well as the editor of the Missionären and manager of other church publications. He and his daughter Emmy were key in founding the Augustana Hospital in Chicago, which initially opened in Carlsson's home in 1884.

Carlsson retired in 1889 due to his poor health and moved to Kansas. He spent the end of his life in Chicago. He died at his daughter's home there on October 19, 1893, and was buried in Graceland Cemetery.

== Family ==
In 1855, Carlsson married Eva Charlotta Andersson. They had three children, Eben Carlsson, Samuel E. Carlsson, and Emmy Christine Evald, who became a teacher, philanthropist, and feminist.

== See also ==
- Gustaf Unonius, pioneering Swedish Episcopal pastor in Chicago
