= Milton, Minnesota =

The following places are called Milton in Minnesota

- Austin Township, Mower County, Minnesota contains the unincorporated community of Two Rivers, also known as Milton.
- Milton Township, Dodge County, Minnesota
- Burnside Township, Goodhue County, Minnesota was formerly named Milton.
