= Vasa Children's Home =

Orphanage in Minnesota, United States

Coordinates: 44°34′1″N 92°38′7″W

Vasa Children's Home was the oldest orphanage in the U.S. state of Minnesota. It was founded by Swedish missionary Eric Norelius in 1865 and evolved into what is now Lutheran Social Service of Minnesota. After 151 years of operation the home itself closed in 2016, though Lutheran Social Service continues to serve the same populations as one of the largest non-profit social services providers in the state.

== History ==
A promotional photograph of the landscape surrounding the former orphanage taken in 2008.

Vasa Lutheran Church and later Vasa Children's Home were in what was then the village of Vasa, so named after King Gustav Vasa, who ruled Sweden from 1523 to 1560.

The region was home to the Wahpekute Dakota people. When European settlers first arrived to claim land the community was referred to as the Mattson Settlement in Goodhue County, Minnesota after Hans Mattson, the first European to settle the area in 1853, who later encouraged many Swedish families to join him. When the number of Swedish immigrants grew large enough, it was renamed Vasa village after the local church.

The United States government and the Upper Dakota Sioux signed the Treaty of Traverse des Sioux in 1851, which made a large swathe of what is today western and southern Minnesota US land, including the future site of Vasa. While there had already been rapid growth in European settlement of the area largely against Dakota wishes, as US leaders pushed the Westward Expansion, the 1851 treaty further encouraged the wave. Between 1854 and 1880, Vasa grew beyond the original 10 families and the greater Goodhue County recorded more than 4,300 residents. During the 1800s, 19 buildings were built in the village center.

Vasa prospered agriculturally and was notable for hosting a US post office on the original Minnesota Rural Free Delivery route until the 1950s when core businesses closed and growth became stagnant. Today the area is known as the city of Welch, Minnesota and the site of the original village, including the church and orphanage, is on the National Register of Historical Places as the Vasa Historical District. It is the best preserved early Swedish settlement in Minnesota with architecture representative of the era, from which Swedish-descent Americans in Minnesota continue to draw cultural imagery.

=== Vasa Lutheran Church ===
Eric Norelius immigrated to the United States in 1850 and after completing a course of study at Capital University was ordained by the Swedish Lutheran Church in 1855. Red Wing and Vasa were quickly growing congregations in need of a minister, so Norelius incorporated Swedish Lutheran Congregation in 1855. It later became known as Vasa Lutheran Church, and today Vasa Evangelical Lutheran Church.

=== Inception ===
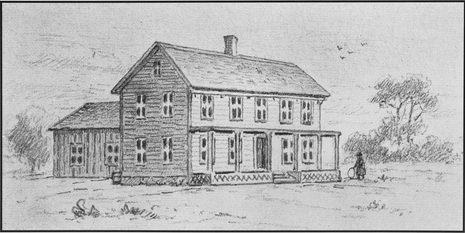
Illustration of the first Vasa Children's Home.

The Vasa Children's Home began in one room of the basement of Vasa Lutheran Church in what was then Vasa village, today the city of Welch, when Reverend Eric Norelius elected to become the guardian of four orphaned Swedish children during a visit to St. Paul, Minnesota in 1856. These first residents were recent immigrants whose parents Mikola and Anna Erikson had died of illness shortly upon arrival in the United States.

Britta Nelson, a Christian school teacher from Stockholm, Wisconsin who was known as "Aunt Brita" to her wards, cared for the children from 1865 to 1869. The community was poor and the operation was not well funded, so the staff and children frequently went hungry. Church members provided childcare, funds, and material goods. Residents observed morning and evening Lutheran devotions and attended services.

Need outgrew the church basement and Norelius purchased ten acres near the church for the home's expansion for $150. A hasty small building typical of pioneer architecture described by Norelius as "a simple hut, yet warm" and as a "shanty" by a later surveyor dedicated to the care of orphans was built. The remaining land was used for farming. This was the first orphanage constructed in Minnesota. Caroline Magny headed the home.

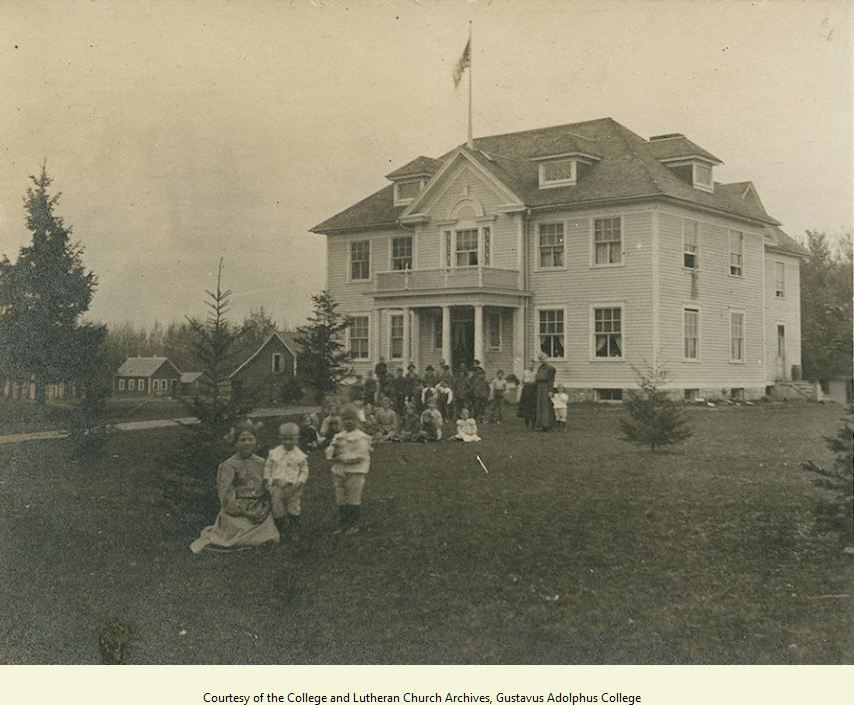
The fourth building of the Vasa Children's Home near what is now Welch, Minnesota, 1907.

The home was entirely rebuilt after a tornado demolished it 2 July 1879 in which four children died, and again after a fire caused by a resident child 16 January 1899.

Despite tragedy, the orphanage and farm continued to find success. By 1876 Vasa Children's Home was known as "a conference institution" and a source of pride for the village of Vasa and the regional Swedish Lutheran churches incorporated as the Minnesota Conference. A 1,400 ft barn and concrete grain silo were erected in 1900 as well as several agricultural sheds in the years up until 1920. Far from its humble beginnings, the newest building had 1,700 square feet available, with 10 bedrooms, and several bathrooms.

==== Education ====
Vasa Children's Home was also a school that taught its residents and nearby families in English and Swedish. Norelius taught four months of summer school starting in 1856. Augusta Carlson is listed as a teacher at Vasa Children's home in 1909. She was born in Minnesota to Swedish immigrants and died in Vasa June 11, 1913. Her parents and five siblings attended the church as members. In 1910 Hortense Bodelson served as principal and the 5th through 8th grade teacher. Grades 1 through 8 were offered in general and Lutheran education, with two months of bible school in the summer.

Eventually the school outgrew the orphanage, which at times housed 80 children, so a school building was constructed onsite. Resident children regularly attended the nearby Vasa Lutheran Church as part of their education.

When the home moved to Burnside, Minnesota in 1926 residents attended the local Burnside Consolidated School.

=== Changing leadership ===
In 1876, Norelius transferred supervision of the home to the Board of the Society of Mercy, part of the Minnesota Conference of the Augustana Synod, in order to focus on his growing missionary efforts.

Former Minnesota senator Frank I. Johnson, who was first elected in 1881, served as a trustee for 12 years. Johnson immigrated from Sweden in 1858 at 18 years old and enlisted in the 8th Minnesota Volunteer Infantry under General Henry Sibley, for which he received commendation from Sibley for his involvement in the Dakota War of 1862 and the American Civil War. He returned to local business and social ventures including Vasa Children's Home when honorably discharged in 1865 at 28 years old.

Lutheran Reverend Bernhard Modin led the Vasa Lutheran Church from March 1906 and served as the president of the Vasa Children's Home board of directors during his tenure. He immigrated from the area of Stockholm, Sweden in 1882 and graduated from Augustana College and later its theological seminary in Rock Island, Illinois. After ordination in the Swedish Lutheran Church of America in 1895 he led several midwestern congregations before settling in Goodhue County to lead Vasa Lutheran Church.

=== Relocation to Burnside ===
The home relocated to its fourth site in Burnside, Minnesota, six miles west of downtown Red Wing, Minnesota, in 1926. Between sixty and seventy children were housed at the Vasa Children's Home during the early 1900s.

Prof. and Mrs. A. P. Anderson of Burnside donated 400 acres of farmland for the new orphanage location on Christmas Eve of 1923 as "a gift to the children." Construction began 21 April 1926 with Lutheran blessing rites from the Minnesota Conference vice president Dr. C. J. Sodergren and the cornerstone was laid by visiting Crown Prince Gustaf Adolph VI of Sweden. Over 1,000 people attended the groundbreaking ceremony. The new home officially opened 16 October 1926 with a second highly attended event and housed 50 children and resident staff.

In 1954, the home's focus shifted from housing orphaned or neglected children to caring for children and adults with disabilities. Over 1,000 orphaned children had lived in the home prior to the shift to disability services.

== Modern era ==
The fourth building of the Vasa Children's Home in Welch, Minnesota, taken in 2008.

The fifth and last building, built in 1973, housed children and young adults with disabilities between the ages of 7 and 22. Lutheran Social Service of Minnesota eventually moved away from the congregate disability home model between 2014 and 2016, which saw children and adults in their care moved primarily to private homes for more individualized services. Thus, Vasa Children's Home was closed and the organization sold the property to private residential buyers.

In 2017 the privately owned and residentially-zoned 1899 building in Welch was slated to become a wedding and event venue. Again in 2017, Colleen and Steve Jensen purchased the home as a personal residence and business location. Their antique store Hoopla Junk now occupies the renovated barn.

A promotional photograph of the agricultural buildings on the site of the former orphanage taken in 2008.

About the historical significance of the location, they expressed gratitude on their Facebook page for the patrons who told them stories of when the home was still in operation. "We have had so many wonderful community members share their personal stories of Vasa Children's Home. We love our community and want to embrace the history of our home."

== See also ==
- Lutheran Social Service of Minnesota
- Swedish Americans#Midwest
