= Lutheran Social Service of Minnesota =

Social service organization headquartered in Saint Paul, Minnesota

- Abbreviation: LSS, LSSMN
- Formation: 1865; 161 years ago
- Type: Social services
- Tax ID no.: 41-0872993
- Headquarters: Saint Paul, Minnesota
- Region served: Minnesota
- Key people: Rev. Eric Norelius (founder); Patrick Thueson (CEO)
- Affiliations: Lutheran Services in America; Evangelical Lutheran Church in America
- Budget: $208 million (2025)
- Staff: 2,500
- Volunteers: 10,000
- Website: Lutheran Social Service of Minnesota

Lutheran Social Service of Minnesota (LSS or LSSMN) is a social service organization headquartered in Saint Paul, Minnesota, with programs serving residents in each of the state's 87 counties.

As one of the largest social service non-profit organizations in Minnesota, LSS employs over 2,500 staff and is supported by 10,000 volunteers. The organization traces its roots to 1865 when Reverend Eric Norelius took in four orphaned Swedish children, founding the Vasa Children's Home.

== History ==
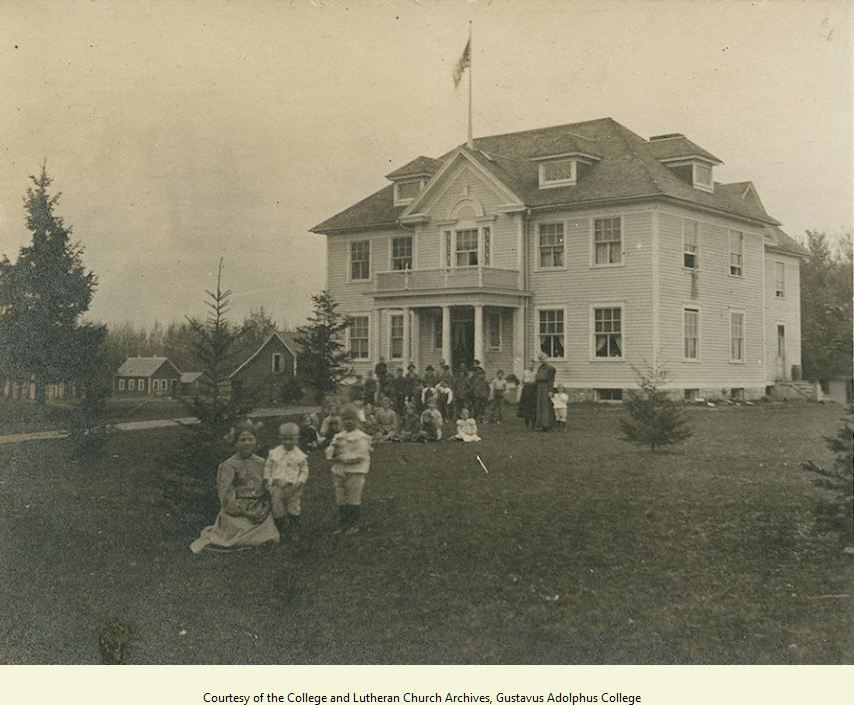
Vasa Children's Home, 1907.

In 1865, Reverend Eric Norelius of Vasa Lutheran Church in Welch, Minnesota purchased ten acres of land near the site of the congregation for an orphanage with cropland to support operating costs. The congregation was caring for four orphaned children in the church basement and needed a formal home as they took in more children. This became Vasa Children's Home, Minnesota's first orphanage. Norelius managed the home until 1876 when he transferred supervision to the Minnesota Conference of the Augustana Lutheran Synod. After being rebuilt twice due to tornado and fire damage, the home moved to its present Red Wing, Minnesota location in 1926.

On January 1, 1963, Lutheran Social Service of Minnesota was established through the merger of several predecessor organizations, including the Lutheran Welfare Society and the Board of Christian Service, which then administered Vasa Children's Home.

Many Ethiopian Oromo immigrants arrived in the Twin Cities during the Ethiopian Civil War, through contacts with the Lutheran Social Service and other groups like Lutheran World Relief, and the International Institute of Minnesota. These groups facilitated the transfer of Oromo refugees from African refugee camps to the homes of sponsor families in Minneapolis and St. Paul.

In 2012, LSS combined its adoption services with Children's Home Society of Minnesota, forming the largest adoption agency in the state.

In August of 2019, Minnesota Governor Tim Walz appointed then-CEO of LSS Jodi Harpstead commissioner of the state Department of Human Services. She had been president and CEO of LSS since September 2011. Harpstead stepped down from her position at LSS when her appointment took effect in September of 2019.

== Services ==
LSS administers programs for children, youth, families, people with disabilities, and older adults through more than 23 lines of service. Among them are adoption and foster care services, behavioral health services, crisis shelters for children and services for youth experiencing homelessness, disaster response, employment services, financial counseling and debt management services, support services for people with disabilities, and support services for older adults.

In addition, LSS operates Camp Knutson, which hosts annual summer camps for children with special needs in Crosslake, Minnesota, and Camp Noah, a program for children and communities impacted by disasters.

=== Center for Changing Lives ===
In 2008, LSS opened the Center for Changing Lives, a hub for multiple community services and 48 units of affordable housing in the Phillips neighborhood of Minneapolis. LSS opened a second Center for Changing Lives to serve youth experiencing homelessness in Duluth, Minnesota in June 2017.

== Affiliations ==
LSS is a member of the Lutheran Services in America (LSA) network.

The organization is affiliated with Minnesota's six synods of the Evangelical Lutheran Church in America (ELCA). Other faith-based partners include Thrivent Financial and Global Refuge. Target is a corporate partner.
