= Vestkusten =

Swedish-language American newspaper

- Type: Weekly newspaper
- Founder: Johannes Telleen
- Founded: 1887
- Ceased publication: 2007
- Language: Swedish
- City: San Francisco, California, United States
- ISSN: 1073-6883
- Free online archives: https://cdnc.ucr.edu/cgi-bin/cdnc?a=cl&cl=CL1&sp=VEST

Vestkusten was an American newspaper, originally in Swedish, and published in California from 1887 to 2007. It was founded as Ebenezer, a church news bulletin by Augustana Lutheran pastor Johannes Telleen, but it soon changed focus and became a newspaper after he gave it over to editor and typesetter Alrik G. Spencer. For most of its run, it was a weekly newspaper published in San Francisco. It was primarily a local newspaper for Swedish Americans in northern California, but also contained news from the Swedish press in the form of special reports.

Swedish-Americans Ernst Skarstedt and Alexander Olsson took over the newspaper in 1894, increasing its popularity. After Olsson's death in the 1950s, it was run by writer Karin Person for some time; the association Friends of Vestkusten was founded in 1968 to keep it afloat when Person began to struggle. More recently, the paper was owned and operated for many years by Swedish-American Barbro Sachs-Osher, who purchased it in 1991.

It has been digitized and is searchable on the Internet under CDNC – the California Digital Newspaper Collection – which also contains digitized versions of many other newspapers. The CDNC invites volunteers to proofread to correct conversion errors from scanning and digitizing.

At the time of its closure, Vestkusten was incorporated into Nordstjernan, a newspaper with an editorial office in New York but with part of its circulation printed in California.
