= Jonas Swensson =

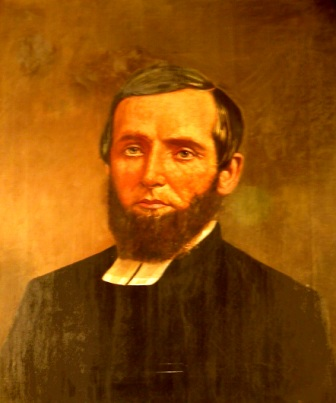
- Reverend Jonas Swensson
- Born: August 16, 1828; Våthult in Jönköping, Sweden
- Died: December 20, 1873 (aged 45); Andover in Henry County, Illinois
- Education: University of Uppsala
- Occupation: Clergyman
- Religion: Lutheran
- Church: Augustana Evangelical Lutheran Church

Jonas Swensson (August 16, 1828 - December 20, 1873) was a noted minister of the Lutheran Church and president of the Augustana Evangelical Lutheran Church.

== Biography ==
Swensson was born at the Snollsbo Östregård farm in Våthult parish, Jönköping County in Sweden. He was the son of church-warden Sven Månsson and his wife Katharina Jonasdotter. He attended high school at Växjö and studied theology at the University of Uppsala. He was ordained at Växjö Cathedral on October 8, 1851. His Swedish pastoral service was at Unnaryd, situated in Hylte Municipality, Halland County, Sweden (1851–1856). In 1856, he married Maria Blixt (1831-1874) and together they emigrated the same year to begin his work at Sugar Grove, Pennsylvania and later at Jamestown, New York.

The organizing meeting of the Augustana Evangelical Lutheran Church was held at the Jefferson Prairie Settlement, near Clinton, Wisconsin from June 5–8, 1860. Jonas Swensson was part of the quartet of pastors, together with Lars Paul Esbjörn, Tuve Hasselquist, and Erland Carlsson who pioneered the Augustana Evangelical Lutheran Church also known as the Augustana Synod. After serving as secretary of the church for several years, he was president of the Augustana Synod from 1870 to his death in 1873. His wife, Maria, died the following year. Both Jonas and Maria Swensson were buried in the churchyard of Jenny Lind Chapel at Andover in Henry County, Illinois.

== Primary Source ==
- Eklund, Emmet E. (1988) His Name was Jonas, a Biography of Jonas Swensson (Rock Island, IL: Augustana Historical Society)

== Additional Sources ==
- Swensson, Jonas (1957) Two primary sources for a study of the life of Jonas Swensson (Rock Island, IL: Augustana Historical Society)
- Gross, Ernie (1990) This Day in Religion (New York: Neil-Schuman Publisher)
- Arden, G. Everett (1958) Half a Million Swedes, America's Lutherans (Columbus OH: Wartburg Press)
