= Vasa Township, Goodhue County, Minnesota =

Vasa Township, Minnesota
- Township
- Location within the state of Minnesota Vasa Township, Minnesota (the United States)
- Coordinates: 44°30′21″N 92°44′3″W
- Country: United States
- State: Minnesota
- County: Goodhue

Area
  - Total: 41.2 sq mi (106.6 km^{2})
  - Land: 41.0 sq mi (106.1 km^{2})
  - Water: 0.19 sq mi (0.5 km^{2})
- Elevation: 1,093 ft (333 m)

Population (2000)
  - Total: 872
  - Density: 21/sq mi (8.2/km^{2})
- Time zone: UTC-6 (Central (CST))
  - Summer (DST): UTC-5 (CDT)
- ZIP code: 55089
- Area code: 651
- FIPS code: 27-66640
- GNIS feature ID: 0665852
- Website: https://vasamn.gov/

Vasa Township is a township in Goodhue County, Minnesota, United States. The population was 872 at the 2000 census. Part of the township is part of the Vasa Historic District on the National Register of Historic Places.

Vasa Township was organized in 1858 and named for Gustav I of Sweden (Gustav Vasa). The township has been referred to by multiple names in the past, including Mattson('s) Settlement, Vasa, and Vasa Village.

== History ==
In 1853 Hans Mattson was the first European to settle the area. He later encouraged many Swedish families to join him. The group of families was known as the Mattson Settlement. The settlement was later renamed Vasa (variously referred to as Vasa Village), for the local Swedish church who had chosen the name of the king of Sweden during the Reformation.

The United States government and the Upper Dakota Sioux entered into the Treaty of Traverse des Sioux in 1851, which made a large swathe of what is today western and southern Minnesota US land, including the growing site of Vasa. While there had already been rapid growth in European settlement of the area largely against Dakota wishes, as US leaders pushed the Westward Expansion, the 1851 treaty further encouraged the wave. Between 1854 and 1880, Vasa grew beyond the original 10 families and the greater Goodhue County recorded more than 4,300 residents. During the 1800s, 19 buildings were built in the village center.

Vasa prospered agriculturally and was notable for hosting a US post office on the original Minnesota Rural Free Delivery route until the 1950s when core businesses closed and growth became stagnant. Today the site of the original village, including the church and orphanage, is on the National Register of Historical Places as the Vasa Historical District. It is the best preserved early Swedish settlement in Minnesota with architecture representative of the era, from which Swedish-descent Americans in Minnesota continue to draw cultural imagery.

=== Historic district ===
- Vasa Historic District
- U.S. National Register of Historic Places
- U.S. Historic district
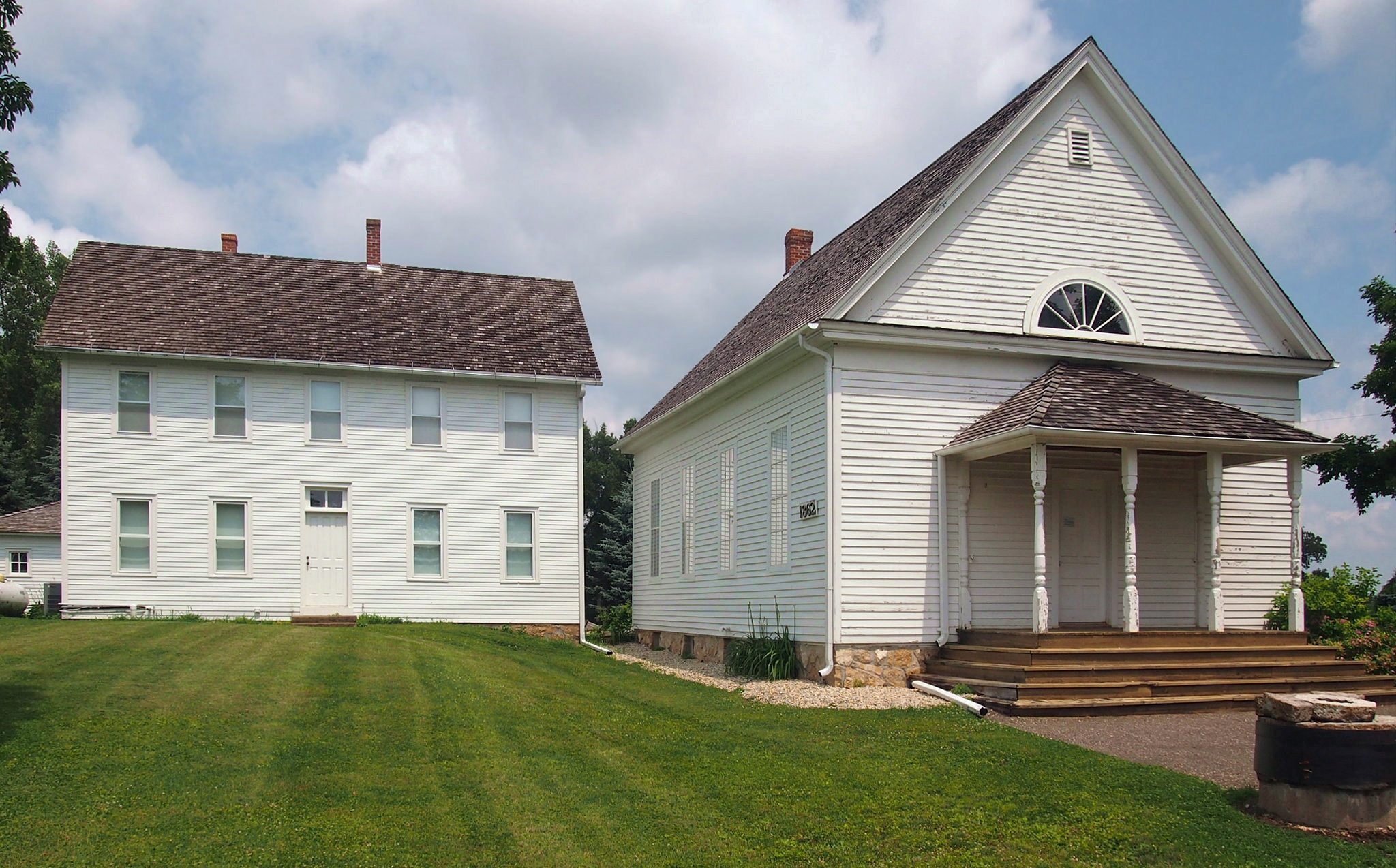
- Vasa Museum and Caretaker's House
- Nearest city: Red Wing, Minnesota
- Area: 100 acres (40 ha)
- MPS: Rural Goodhue County MRA (AD)
- NRHP reference No.: 75000983
- Added to NRHP: May 30, 1975

A portion of the community is listed on the National Register of Historic Places as the Vasa Historic District. Vasa was established in 1853 by Swedish immigrant farmers. While its population declined significantly in the twentieth century, the architecture and landscape of the district is well-preserved and its National Register nomination described it as "the most intact... of the original Swedish colonies in Minnesota". The Old Vasa Swedish Lutheran Church, which was built in 1861, is now a museum of local Swedish history. Vasa Children's Home was originally located in the church and later had its own building nearby.

== Geography ==
According to the United States Census Bureau, the township has a total area of 41.2 square miles (106.6 km^{2}), of which 41.0 square miles (106.1 km^{2}) is land and 0.2 square mile (0.5 km^{2}) (0.49%) is water.

State Highway 19 (MN 19) and County 7 Boulevard are two of the main routes in the township.

== Demographics ==
As of the census of 2000, there were 872 people, 293 households, and 239 families residing in the township. The population density was 21.3 people per square mile (8.2/km^{2}). There were 310 housing units at an average density of 7.6/sq mi (2.9/km^{2}). The racial makeup of the township was 99.08% White, 0.11% African American, 0.23% Native American, 0.11% from other races, and 0.46% from two or more races. Hispanic or Latino of any race were 0.80% of the population.

There were 293 households, out of which 42.0% had children under the age of 18 living with them, 68.9% were married couples living together, 5.8% had a female householder with no husband present, and 18.1% were non-families. 13.0% of all households were made up of individuals, and 6.1% had someone living alone who was 65 years of age or older. The average household size was 2.98 and the average family size was 3.29.

In the township the population was spread out, with 30.3% under the age of 18, 6.5% from 18 to 24, 27.2% from 25 to 44, 25.1% from 45 to 64, and 10.9% who were 65 years of age or older. The median age was 38 years. For every 100 females, there were 106.6 males. For every 100 females age 18 and over, there were 106.1 males.

The median income for a household in the township was $53,281, and the median income for a family was $56,688. Males had a median income of $33,750 versus $22,500 for females. The per capita income for the township was $23,629. About 3.0% of families and 4.9% of the population were below the poverty line, including 4.6% of those under age 18 and 8.1% of those age 65 or over.

== Notable figures ==
- Hans Mattson, the first European to settle the site of Vasa who later served as the Minnesota Secretary of State and the United States Consul General in India.
- John Lind, the 14th Governor of Minnesota and a political agent in the Mexican Revolution under President Woodrow Wilson.
- Frank I. Johnson, Minnesota senator.
- Eric Norelius, an early figure in Minnesota Lutheranism who established Vasa's church and orphanage.

== See also ==
- Vasa Children's Home
- Swedish Americans#Midwest
- Goodhue County, Minnesota
- Vasa, Finland
