= Herchurch =

Ebenezer Lutheran Church
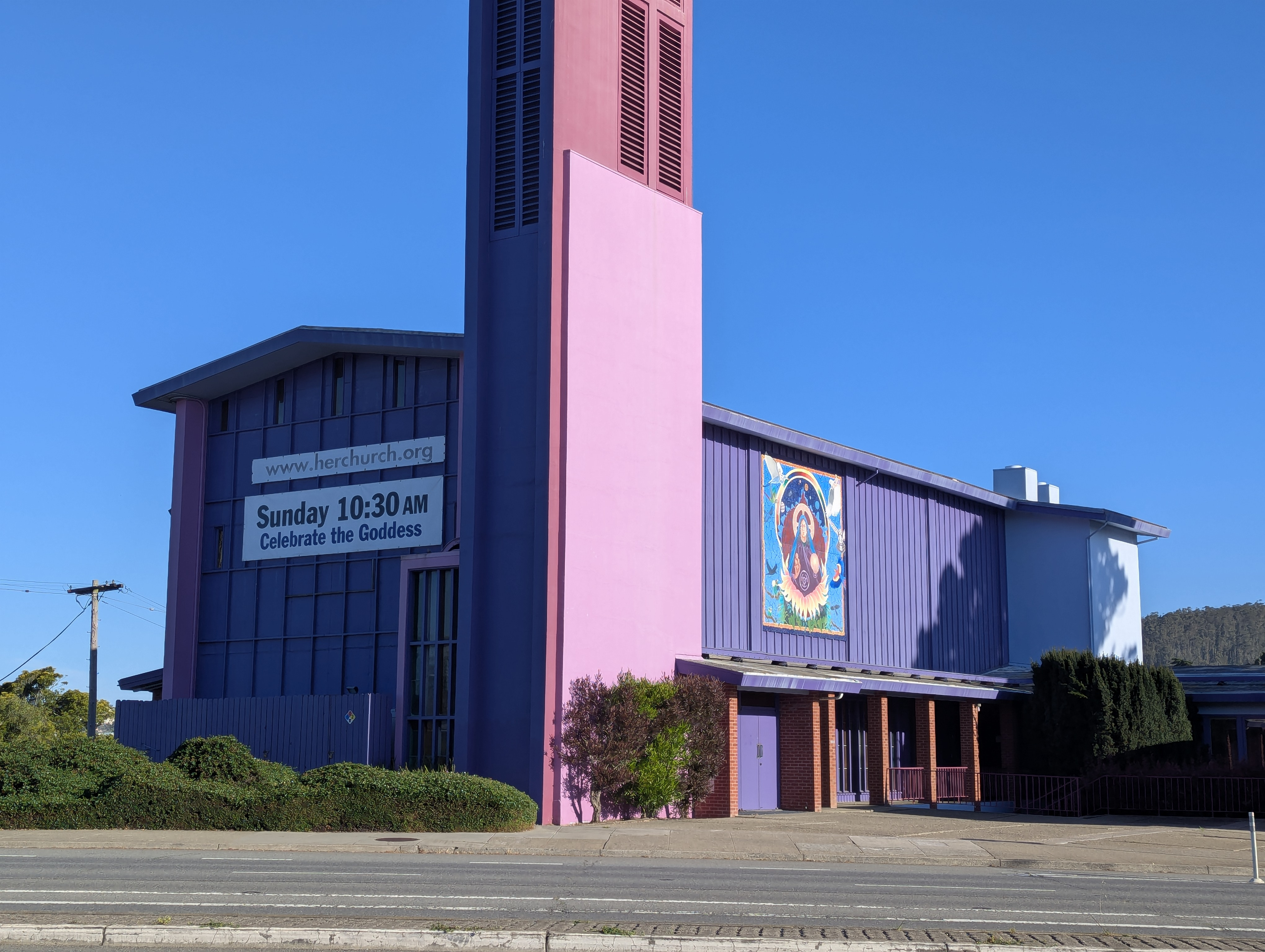
- Ebenezer Lutheran Church
- 37.74511°N 122.45329°W
- Location: 678 Portola Drive, San Francisco, California

Ebenezer Lutheran Church, also known as herchurch, is a congregation within the Evangelical Lutheran Church in America (ELCA) in San Francisco. The church is a member of the San Francisco Council of Lutheran Churches. The church was founded on August 10, 1882, by Augustana Lutheran minister Johannes Telleen, who served as its pastor until 1890. The construction of the first church building was completed in 1895. For many years, the church primarily served the Swedish population; the original church building was designed by Swedish American architect August Nordin.

Rev. Stacy Boorn, M. Div., the minister for herchurch, uses feminist theology in the church's expression of faith, worship, learning, mutual care, and acts of justice. Its former associate pastor is Megan Rohrer, who is transgender. Rohrer was ordained extraordinarily, at the time in defiance of the ELCA rules. Rohrer was elected to the office of bishop of the Sierra Pacific Synod of the ELCA in May 2021. Bishop Rohrer began their (Rohrer uses gender-neutral singular they pronouns) six-year term as bishop in September 2021. Previously, Rohrer was rostered by Extraordinary Lutheran Ministries, which is "committed to the full participation of persons of all sexual orientations and gender identities in the life and ministry of the Lutheran church." In December 2021, however, Rohrer was suspended from the ELM membership roster for alleged "racist words and actions".

Since 2007, Ebenezer Lutheran has annually on the first weekend in November sponsored a three-day conference on faith and feminism, often with a focus on reviving traditions of honoring the sacred feminine as manifested in the Hellenistic and Jewish concept of Sophia, and in the faith-traditions of minorities. The 2009 conference focused on the pseudohistorical idea that Jesus was married to Mary Magdalene, an idea featured prominently in Dan Brown's famous novel The Da Vinci Code.

== See also ==
- Christian feminism
- Christian left
- Christianity and homosexuality
- Christopaganism
- Gender roles in Christianity
- Goddess movement
- Herstory
- Liberal Christianity
- Liberation theology
- Metropolitan Community Church
- Political theology
- Progressive Christianity
- Queer theology
- Religious pluralism
- Thealogy
