= Lectionary 304 =

Lectionary ℓ 304
- New Testament manuscript
- Text: Evangelistarium †
- Date: 14th century
- Script: Greek
- Found: 1876
- Now at: Lutheran School of Theology at Chicago
- Size: 24.5 cm by 16.9 cm
- Type: Byzantine text-type

Lectionary 304 (Gregory-Aland), designated by siglum ℓ 304 (in the Gregory-Aland numbering) is a Greek manuscript of the New Testament, on paper. Palaeographically it has been assigned to the 14th century. The manuscript is lacunose.

== Description ==
The original codex contained lessons from the Gospel of John, Matthew, and Luke (Evangelistarium), on 219 paper leaves, with lacunae in the beginning, the end, and in 26 places inside. The leaves are measured (24.5 cm by 16.9 cm). It is difficult to determine number of quires.

The text is written in Greek minuscule letters, in one column per page, 24-25 lines per page. The manuscript contains weekday Gospel lessons.

== History ==
Gregory dated the manuscript to the 14th or 15th century. It has been assigned by the INTF to the 14th century.

It used to be held in the Church of Prodromus, then in the Church of the Birth of God. It was found in 1876 in ruins of the monastery in Cyprus. A. E. Bate bought it 1878 in the village Kikos (?).

The manuscript was added to the list of New Testament manuscripts by Scrivener (492^{e}) and Caspar René Gregory (number 304^{e}). It was examined by Dean Burgon. Gregory saw it in 1883. The manuscript was purchased by L. Franklin Gruber (1870–1941).

Currently the codex is housed at the Lutheran School of Theology at Chicago (Gruber Ms. 111) in the Chicago.

== See also ==
- List of New Testament lectionaries
- Biblical manuscript
- Textual criticism
- Lectionary 303

== Bibliography ==
- Gregory, Caspar René (1900). Textkritik des Neuen Testaments, Vol. 1. Leipzig: J.C. Hinrichs’sche Buchhandlung. p. 413.
