= IIMN (disambiguation) =

IIMN either refers to:

- Indian Institute of Management Nagpur, a public sector business school located in Nagpur, Maharashtra, India
- International Institute of Minnesota, a social service agency located in St. Paul, Minnesota, United States
