= Corus International =

Global humanitarian organization

- Founded: 2020
- Type: Non-governmental organization (NGO)
- Location: Washington, D.C.
- Region served: Worldwide
- Key people: Daniel V. Speckhard (President and CEO); Kenneth Jones II (Chair of the Board)
- Subsidiaries: Lutheran World Relief; IMA World Health; CGA Technologies; Ground Up Investing; Cadasta; Farmers Market Brands
- Website: corusinternational.org

Corus International is a global non-profit and social enterprise organization headquartered in Washington, D.C.. The organization works to strengthen health systems, agricultural markets, disaster preparedness and response, education systems, and economic opportunities in low and middle-income countries.

== Background ==
Corus International was established in 2020, following the integration of international NGOs Lutheran World Relief, IMA World Health and other organizations. Corus organizations include CGA Technologies, Ground Up Investing, Cadasta, and Farmers Market Brands. Since the formation of Corus International, the collective provides expertise in public health, agriculture and rural development, and humanitarian response.

== Programs ==
Corus International provides a range of solutions and programs that aim to reduce and eradicate poverty. This is delivered through humanitarian response and by improving existing systems in countries in partnership with local government. This includes providing services to improve health services, economic development in rural areas, and education provisions.

Corus emphasizes connecting emergency aid and longer-term recovery, instead of treating them as separate phases. This includes working with farmers and governments to strengthen food security in countries experiencing conflict, alongside regions affected by environmental challenges such as prolonged drought.

TRACE (Traceability and Resilience in Agriculture and Cocoa Ecosystems) is part of the U.S. Department of Agriculture (USDA) Food for Progress program and is being implemented by Corus International organization Lutheran World Relief. The initiative focuses on strengthening the long-term sustainability and productivity of Nigeria's cocoa sector. Operating across several of the country's principal cocoa-producing states, the program promotes climate-smart agricultural practices while improving the traceability of cocoa from cultivation through to market distribution. Through these efforts, TRACE aims to enhance the resilience of farming communities, improve crop yields and support the continued development of Nigeria's cocoa industry. Corus International’s programs in traceability have expanded beyond Nigeria into neighboring regions and countries. It has been used in Tanzania to strengthen coffee and cocoa production in the country.

Its global health programs build on the expertise of IMA World Health, strengthening existing health systems by improving disease prevention and treatment, maternal and child health, nutrition, and responses to infectious disease outbreaks.

Corus International responds to crises and disasters, such as damage caused by floods and hurricanes. In recent years this has included recovery projects in Caribbean nations, working alongside other non-profits, such as JN Foundation and St John Ambulance. Domestically, Corus International's efforts have included the June 2026 flooding in Texas, where flash flooding and evacuations forced hundreds of people from their homes.
