= Gruber Collection =

Collection of Theological books and manuscripts

The Gruber Collection is a collection of books and manuscripts housed at the Lutheran School of Theology at Chicago in Chicago, Illinois. The collection contains more than 300 books from the 15th to 18th centuries and 14 manuscripts of Greek New Testament (minuscules and lectionaries). The collection contains a number of works with special value, including those of Luther, copies of his letters, original letters written by Philipp Melanchthon, the Greek New Testament of Erasmus, and other documents of Reformation era. All manuscripts and majority of books were collected by L. Franklin Gruber (1870–1941), the former president of the Lutheran School of Theology at Chicago in Maywood, Illinois. He purchased them in Europe and brought to Chicago.

== Manuscripts ==
- Gruber 44 (Gregory 1282)
- Gruber 50 (Gregory 2304)
- Gruber 52 (Gregory ℓ 1536)
- Gruber 53 (Gregory ℓ 1624)
- Gruber 56 (Gregory ℓ 1625)
- Gruber 111 (Gregory ℓ 1677)
- Gruber 114 (Gregory 2426)
- Gruber 119 (Gregory 2389)
- Gruber 122 (Gregory 2393)
- Gruber 124 (Gregory ℓ 1627)
- Gruber 125 (Gregory ℓ 1628)
- until 2016: Gruber 152 (Gregory 1424)
