= Venia concionandi =

Authorization for a Lutheran lay preacher

Venia concionandi, also referred to as venia, is a special authorization for a lay person to preach and conduct the church service in Lutheran churches, such as the Church of Sweden and the Evangelical Lutheran Church of Finland. It has been implemented at different times in different areas: the concept in Sweden dates back to the Church Law of 1686; in Alsace–Lorraine in the German Empire, it was put into place in 1855. It was intended as a role for theology students going into the ministry, as a form of preparation, according to scholar Hans Cnattingius. It has also been described as "having a dual function: that of acknowledging lay preachers derived from the many revivalist movements, whilst also controlling them." In one case in Savonlinna, Finland, one man was denied the position after it was discovered he was not even a member of the Church of Finland; he was a leader of the Russian Pentecostal movement. A person who holds venia is called a veniat.

Venia has traditionally been conferred by the bishop; in Sweden after the turn of the 21st century, the Church Order allows the vicar to as well without the approval of the bishop. As one scholar notes, "this order can be said to reflect Confessio Augustana (CA) XIV": "no one should publicly teach in the Church or administer the Sacraments unless he be regularly called." The preacher is not required to be confirmed or undergo any particular training. In Sweden since the turn of the 21st century, the role has been almost non-existent; however, some have been given the authorization.

Among those who have served in the role are Erland Carlsson and Carl Olof Rosenius.
