= Lutheran World Relief =

Nonprofit organization founded 1945

- Founded: 1945
- Type: International NGO
- Purpose: Humanitarian aid
- Location: Baltimore, Maryland, US
- Region served: Worldwide
- Key people: Daniel V. Speckhard, President and C.E.O. Jean Hanson, Chair of the Board
- Revenue: US$47 million (2016)
- Employees: 71 (U.S.)
- Website: lwr.org

Lutheran World Relief (LWR) is an international non-governmental organization that focuses on sustainable development projects and disaster relief and recovery. The organization was founded in 1945 to collect and send aid to people living in post-World War II Europe. Today, LWR helps communities living in extreme poverty adapt to the challenges that threaten their livelihoods and well-being, and responds to emergencies with a long-term view. It is a member of the Corus International family of faith-based international development organizations, which include IMA World Health, CGA Technologies, Ground Up Investing, and LWR Farmers Market Coffee.

One of LWR's flagship programs – started in 1945 and continuing today – is its Quilt and Kit Ministry. Each year Lutherans across the United States assemble and donate LWR Mission Quilts, as well as several kinds of care kits to assist people living in poverty in times of emergency or great need.

As of 2025, LWR met the standards set by the Better Business Bureau's BBB Wise Giving Alliance. As of 2025, CharityWatch provided a combined score for Lutheran World Relief and IMA World Health, giving them an A, signifying top-rated. As of October 2025, LWR held a 4-star rating with Charity Navigator. As of 2025, Lutheran World Relief held a 5-star rating on crowd-sourced charity reviewer GreatNonprofits, having last received its Top-Rated Nonprofit award in 2016.

LWR is a member of the ACT Alliance, a global alliance of churches and related agencies working on development that are committed to working together.

== History ==
Lutheran World Relief was officially founded in 1945, as Lutherans in the United States began responding to the refugee crisis in post-World War II Europe by sending food, clothing and quilts. By the end of the decade, LWR was also sending relief aid to those affected by conflicts in Palestine, Hong Kong, Korea, and Bangladesh. In the 1960s and 1970s, LWR began forming methodologies of working in agriculture and with farming cooperatives to increase rural incomes and food security in the developing world, eventually changing its articles of incorporation to reflect its work in international development. In 1979, LWR opened it first regional office in Peru.

In the 1980s, famine in Africa made international headlines, especially the 1983–1985 famine in Ethiopia. In response, LWR shipped 5,000 tons of wheat to northern Ethiopia and also opened a regional office in West Africa. For its work in responding to the Ethiopian Civil War and famine, LWR became the first faith-based development agency to receive the Presidential End Hunger award. During the civil war, LWR facilitated the transfer of Oromo people from refugee camps in Africa to homes of sponsors in the Twin Cities, along with other groups like Lutheran Social Service and the International Institute of Minnesota. In 1999, LWR moved its headquarters from New York City to the newly built Lutheran Center in Baltimore, Maryland.

Since 2000, LWR has increased its emphasis on sustainable agriculture and climate adaptation while continuing to respond to major natural disasters and humanitarian crises around the world. As of 2023, in addition to responding to emerging crises as needed, LWR maintains ongoing operations in 29 countries in Central and South America, Africa, the Middle East, Asia and Oceania.

== Organizational structure ==
In its founding structure, Lutheran World Relief was originally led by a secretary. In 1953, the organization changed its top leadership position to an executive director. In 1996, LWR transitioned to being led by a President and CEO, the structure that remains in place today. LWR's president and CEO reports to a 15-member board of directors.

LWR is divided into four departments:

- The President's Office, which oversees strategic leadership of the organization, manages relationships with church bodies and other major stakeholders and acts as a liaison between the organization and its board of directors
- International Programs Department, which designs and implements international development programs, conducts project monitoring and evaluation and coordinates emergency responses
- External Relations & Strategic Partnerships, responsible for LWR's marketing and communications, as well as building and maintaining relationships with individual, congregational and institutional donors and funders
- Finance & Administration, which manages the finances for LWR's domestic operations and international projects

== Core program areas ==
LWR's projects are structured to address three core program areas:

=== Agriculture ===
LWR's programs in agriculture focus on improving the livelihoods of millions of smallholder farmers and their families by through sustainable agricultural practices that build food security and increase rural incomes. Some approaches LWR uses to carry out this work are:

- Through agricultural value chains: This refers to all the steps involved in producing an agricultural product, from planting to the final product. Farmers involved in many steps of the agriculture value chain have the ability to earn more income from their crops. LWR projects help farmers learn how to take part in various roles in the agriculture value chain.
- Strengthening farmers' organizations: LWR works with farmer and producer organizations to increase their capacity to deliver services to their farmer-members, such as training, the communal use of equipment, and relationships with credit institutions to help farmers secure seeds, fertilizer, and other tools necessary to plant crops. LWR projects help farmers' and producers' organizations improve their governance, build relationships with credit institutions, and implement support for their farmer-members.
- Climate-Smart Agriculture: LWR works with farmers to cope with and overcome the effects of changing climate conditions through conservation agriculture, sustainable land management and the improvement of water access, management, and protection.

=== Climate ===
LWR's programs in climate change focus on helping rural communities adapt to changing climates by:

- promoting Climate-Smart Agriculture practices
- working with communities to develop disaster preparedness and disaster risk management plans
- promoting sustainable and renewable energy sources in rural communities; and
- protecting communities' natural assets – such as water and soil – from degradation through reforestation.

=== Emergency operations ===
LWR's emergency operations focus on helping rural communities prepare for disasters before they happen and cope with and recover from emergencies in ways that promote lasting improvements in living conditions by:

- expediting aid on the ground through the use of cash transfer programs
- meeting short-term material needs with non-food items, such as blankets and cooking utensils
- supporting local partners to conduct programs that meet international quality and accountability standards;
- transitioning work to support early recovery and helping communities recover their livelihoods in ways intended to better prepare them to cope with future disasters; and
- working with communities to become better prepared and equipped to withstand and recover from emergencies.

LWR has implemented significant response programs to natural disasters, including the 2004 Indian Ocean tsunami, the 2010 Haiti earthquake, Super-Typhoon Haiyan in the Philippines, and the 2015 Nepal earthquakes, as well as crises caused by conflict in South Sudan, Iraq, and Syria.

== Quilts and kits ==
Every year Lutherans across the U.S. sew quilts and assemble kits of supplies that LWR sends to partners around the world that request them to meet the needs of people affected by poverty and disaster.

Mission Quilts were one of the earliest forms of aid that Lutherans sent through LWR to reach out to people in other parts of the world. In 2016, LWR sent $14 million worth of quilts and kits to more than 576,000 people in 21 different countries.

There are four kinds of LWR Kits. LWR Personal Care Kits contain items like toothbrushes, wash cloths, and soap, intended to help a person or family maintain hygiene practices. LWR School Kits contain notebooks, pencils, erasers, a backpack, and other items to use for students to attend school. LWR Baby Care Kits contain T-shirts, cloth diapers, and other items to care for a baby. LWR Fabric Kits contain fabric, thread, and needles so that people can learn to sew, potentially to earn an income.

In 2013, LWR joined the United Nations Humanitarian Resource Depot, which allowed it to pre-position quilts and kits in depots across the world for rapid deployment after an emergency.

== LWR Farmers Market Coffee ==
The LWR Farmers Market Coffee program began in 2017 in partnership with THRIVE Farmers. Using a direct trade model, coffee is sourced from farmers participating in LWR projects; the farmers receive an initial, up-front price for their coffee beans as well as a portion of the sales profit. THRIVE Farmers also directs 80 cents per pound of coffee sold back to LWR's international programs. LWR Farmers Market Coffee currently offers medium, dark and decaf roasts.

LWR has also partnered with fair trade organizations Equal Exchange (1998–2016), Divine Chocolate (2007–2014), and SERRV (1999–2014).

== Eco-Palms ==
In 2005, LWR began to partner with the University of Minnesota Center for Integrated Natural Resources and Agricultural Management to offer Eco-Palms to congregations throughout the United States. Eco-Palms is a program that engages palm harvesters in Mexico and Guatemala and provides training on sustainable palm harvesting and trains members of harvesting communities to sort and package palms in order to retain more of the income from the palm industry. Through Eco-Palms, congregations order palms through Lutheran World Relief for their Palm Sunday celebrations.
