= Daniel V. Speckhard =

American diplomat

Daniel Speckhard
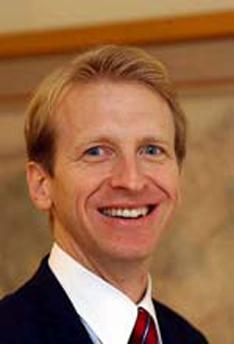

United States Ambassador to Greece
- In office November 29, 2007 – September 9, 2010
- Nominated by: George W. Bush
- Preceded by: Charles P. Ries
- Succeeded by: Daniel Bennett Smith

United States Ambassador to Belarus
- In office September 18, 1997 – August 5, 2000
- Nominated by: Bill Clinton
- Preceded by: Kenneth S. Yalowitz
- Succeeded by: Michael G. Kozak

Personal details
- Born: June 11, 1959 (age 67) Clintonville, Wisconsin, U.S.
- Party: Democratic
- Education: University of Wisconsin–Madison
- Profession: Diplomat

Daniel Vern Speckhard (born June 11, 1959) is an American diplomat and nonprofit executive. Speckhard is the president and CEO of Corus International, an ensemble of faith-based organizations including Lutheran World Relief and IMA World Health, and is a former United States Ambassador to Greece and Belarus. In addition to his diplomatic and nonprofit service, Speckhard has worked as a non-resident senior fellow at the Brookings Institution and is currently a non-resident senior fellow at the Atlantic Council.

== Early life and education ==
Born in Clintonville, Wisconsin on June 11, 1959, Speckhard received a bachelor's degree, a master's degree in public policy and administration, and a master's degree in economics from the University of Wisconsin–Madison.

== Career ==
=== Early career ===
Prior to joining the State Department in 1990, Speckhard worked for the International Affairs Division of the Office of Management and Budget, the Agency for International Development, a staff member in the U.S. Senate, and in state and local government.

=== Diplomat ===
From 1990 to 1993, Speckhard served as an advisor and then director of policy and resources for the Deputy Secretary of State, coordinating and overseeing foreign aid funding in support of U.S. policy objectives. He received special recognition for his role in reorienting these programs to meet the new challenges of the post-Cold War era.

Speckhard served from 1993 to 1997 as deputy to the ambassador-at-large for the New Independent States at the State Department in Washington. He was responsible for a broad range of political, security and economic issues facing large parts of the former Soviet Union.

As U.S. Ambassador to Belarus from 1997 to 2000, Speckhard worked closely with the Organization for Security and Cooperation in Europe and the European Union in promoting democratic reform, human rights, and institutional development.

From 2000 to 2003, he was NATO’s deputy assistant secretary general for political affairs, covering political relations with the countries of Eastern Europe, the Balkans, the former Soviet Union, and the Mediterranean. During this period, Speckhard received the NATO Service Medal for his crisis management work. From 2003 to 2005, Speckhard served at the North Atlantic Treaty Organization as director of Policy Planning – responsible for advising and assisting the Secretary General of NATO, senior NATO management, and the North Atlantic Council in addressing strategic issues facing the alliance.

Speckhard served in Iraq from 2005 to 2007, first as the director of the Iraq Reconstruction Management Office, responsible for overseeing the $18.4 billion Iraq Relief and Reconstruction Fund and then as the deputy chief of mission at the U.S. Embassy in Baghdad, Iraq.

Speckhard was sworn in as U.S. Ambassador to Greece on November 7, 2007, and arrived in Athens on November 15, 2007, where he served until 2010.

=== Banking ===
From February 1, 2011, until August 19, 2011, Speckhard was non-executive chairman of the Greek Proton Bank.

=== International development ===
On April 11, 2014, Lutheran World Relief (LWR) announced that Speckhard was named president and CEO. He began at LWR on July 1, 2014. He has served as a nonresident senior fellow in the Global Economy and Development program at the Brookings Institution, and is currently a nonresident senior fellow in the Future Europe Initiative of the Atlantic Council.

Diplomatic posts
Preceded by Kenneth S. Yalowitz	United States Ambassador to Belarus; 1997 – 2000	Succeeded by Michael G. Kozak
Preceded by Charles P. Ries	United States Ambassador to Greece; 2007 – 2010	Succeeded by Daniel Bennett Smith
