= Illinois State University (Springfield, Illinois) =

Former university in Hillsboro and Springfield, Illinois

- Former names: The Literary and Theological Institute of the Far West; Lutheran College; Hillsboro College
- Type: Private
- Active: 1847–1868
- Religious affiliation: Lutheran
- Location: Hillsboro, Illinois (1847–1852); Springfield, Illinois (1852–1868), United States; 39°48′31.3″N 89°38′16.1″W

Illinois State University was a private institution of higher learning in Springfield, Illinois. It began as The Literary and Theological Institute of the Lutheran Church in the Far West in Hillsboro, Illinois, in 1847. It soon became known as the Lutheran College, and, locally, as Hillsboro College. In 1852, it relocated to Springfield and changed its name to Illinois State University. It ceased operations in 1868, but reopened as Carthage College in Carthage, Illinois, in 1870.

== Hillsboro era ==
In 1835, the residents of Hillsboro raised funds to build a school building known as the Hillsboro Academy. John Tillson was the largest contributor, and he also guaranteed the full payment of the teachers and donated various equipment. The first classes were held in November 1837. Courses of study for both boys and girls were provided.

In 1846, the academy's board of trustees petitioned the Illinois Senate to transfer its charter to the Literary and Theological Institute of the Lutheran Church in the Far West. The petition was granted in 1847 and the name was changed to Lutheran College. The academy thereby became part of the college. Although the college was an institution of the Evangelical Lutheran Synod of Northern Illinois, it was still well supported by the general community, and was generally known as Hillsboro College. In an effort to raise $10,000 for an endowment, subscriptions for scholarships were sold. A subscription of $125 gave a 12-year scholarship; $200, a 25-year scholarship, and $400, a perpetual scholarship. The scholarships were also transferable.

In 1852, the Lutherans moved the college to Springfield, the state capital, thinking it would have better prospects. However, the academy remained in Hillsboro, reopening as the original name, Hillsboro Academy. The academy continued to operate until January 28, 1880, at which time it passed into the control of the local public school.

== Springfield era ==
Leading citizens in Springfield had, in 1852, proposed that the college's trustees relocate the college to their city, As incentives, they offered the college $37,000 for construction of a building and for scholarships. The trustees accepted the proposal, despite the fact that the college was debt-free and the building in Hillsboro was worth $6,000. They petitioned for, and received, a new charter as The Illinois State University that allowed the college to create departments not only of theology and of medicine and law, but also of "mechanical philosophy" and of agriculture. While the theology department was to teach Lutheran doctrine, the Lutheran leaders wanted the other departments to be conducted in a nonsectarian manner according to the principles of general Protestant Christianity.

Also in 1852, the school again offered perpetual scholarships, this time for $300. Buyers could either pay the $300 outright, or could pay 6% interest each year. Abraham Lincoln used the latter method, obtaining a scholarship on October 1, 1852, to use for his son, Robert Todd Lincoln. The younger Lincoln entered the preparatory department on the college at age 11 in the fall of 1854, and became a freshman at age 13. Also among the students during the period it was in Springfield was John Hay, who was later Abraham Lincoln's private secretary. On June 28, 1860, Abraham Lincoln was elected to a one-year term as a trustee, making him perhaps the most famous individual associated with the school.

By 1855, the school's financial situation had become precarious. Many of the pledges made by Springfield residents to encourage the school to relocate had not been paid; payments for the perpetual scholarships also lagged. The trustees had hoped that the Illinois legislature would distribute money from the state's Seminary and College Fund to struggling schools such as theirs, but that aid never materialized. The Rev. Francis Springer, who had been president of the college since its founding in 1847, was blamed by some for the situation. He resigned, and professor S. W. Harkey was appointed interim president. The building debt was $15,000, and another $3,000 was owed to Harkey. Adding to the financial difficulties, the number of students declined from 160 in 1854 to 114 in 1856. Despite the appointment of the Rev. W. M. Reynolds as president, conditions worsened, such that by 1858, an additional debt of $2,682 in unpaid faculty salaries had been incurred.

Efforts to increase payments and donations allowed the school to continue operating although still in a precarious financial state. A proposal that the college be moved to another city caused some Springfield residents to contribute more money, but that increase was only temporary.

During the 1850s, the number of German and, especially, Scandinavian Lutherans immigrating to the region increased. In turn, their enrollment in the college likewise increased. In 1858, Lars Paul Esbjorn was appointed professor of Scandinavian languages. On March 31, 1860, he abruptly resigned and advised the Scandinavian students to go home, which all but two did. Esbjorn's stated reason for his departure was that he had not been allowed to give proper religious advice and supervision to the Scandinavian students, although it is likely that growing nativistic sentiments among American-born students had resulted in making the Scandinavian students feel unwelcome. Underlying this were the religious differences that had developed within the Lutheran Synod of Northern Illinois. The Scandinavian Lutherans wanted a complete adherence to the Lutheran Confessions, while others in the synod saw those confessions as only mostly correct. A few months later, on June 10, 1860, the Scandinavian Lutherans withdrew from the Synod of Northern Illinois and formed the Scandinavian Evangelical Lutheran Augustana Synod. Later that same year, Esbjorn and others established Augustana College and Seminary in Chicago.

The loss of the Scandinavian students only added to the school's problems. The outbreak of the Civil War in 1861 caused a further decrease in enrollment to less than 70 in 1862. President Reynolds resigned that year. During the war, a number of students left to enlist in the army, and discipline among the remaining students was lacking. Moreover, the development of the public school system in Illinois meant that high school students who would have attended the academy department of the school instead enrolled in their local public schools, further decreasing the income to Illinois State University.

== Closure ==
By 1867, the situation had become dire. The doctrinal disagreements resulted in the college coming into the control of a new synod that was founded in that year, the Evangelical Lutheran Synod of Central Illinois, but that synod was unable to provide any support. The trustees made a proposal to Wittenberg College in Springfield, Ohio, that the two schools combine their seminaries at the Illinois location as the Lutheran Seminary of the West, but the Ohio school was not interested. All efforts having failed, Illinois State University closed in 1868. At the final meeting of the board of trustees, the college building was leased to two Presbyterians, Rev. J. W. Scott and H. C. Donnel, who opened Springfield College the next year. The property was sold in a Sheriff's Auction and Rev. William Passavant used it for an orphanage for a short period of time.

In 1870, the college was reopened by several of the faculty as Carthage College in Carthage, Illinois. It remained in Carthage until 1964, when the school moved to its current campus in Kenosha, Wisconsin, which it had opened as a second campus in 1962.

A group from Trinity Lutheran Church in Springfield also attempted to use the Illinois State University building for a new school, the Evangelical Lutheran Female College and Normal School, but were unsuccessful because no faculty and only a few students could be found.

In August 1874, the Lutheran Church–Missouri Synod bought the property for $7,474.38 and moved the 29 pre-seminary students of its practical seminary, along with one instructor, from St. Louis to the Springfield campus. The next year, 1875, the practical seminary itself, with 114 students and 2 instructors, moved to the Springfield campus. The seminary, now known as Concordia Theological Seminary, remained in Springfield until it moved to Fort Wayne, Indiana, in 1976.

The college building itself was razed in 1931.

== Sources ==
- Bateman, Newton; Selby, Paul; Strange, Alexander T., eds. (1918). History of Montgomery County. Historical Encyclopedia of Illinois. Vol. II. Chicago: Munsell Publishing Company.
- Evjen, Harry (March 1938). "Illinois State University, 1852-1868". Journal of the Illinois State Historical Society. 31 (1). University of Illinois Press on behalf of the Illinois State Historical Society: 54–71. JSTOR 40187499.
- Jacobs, Henry Eyster (1897). A History of the Evangelical Lutheran Church in the United States (PDF). The American Church History Series. Vol. IV. New York: The Christian Literature Company.
- Lueker, Erwin L.; Poellot, Luther; Jackson, Paul, eds. (2000). Christian Cyclopedia (Online ed.). St. Louis: Concordia Publishing House.
- Roberts, Robert R. (December 1971). "Our "Practical" Seminary" (PDF). The Springfielder. 35 (3): 168–171.
