= IMA World Health =

- Formation: 1960
- Founded at: Washington, D.C., United States
- Type: non profit
- Purpose: Global public health
- Key people: Daniel V. Speckhard President &(CEO)
- Website: imaworldhealth.org

IMA World Health is an international, nonprofit health care service organization. IMA's stated purpose is to "provide health care…without bias, to vulnerable and marginalized people in the developing world." It is a member of the Corus International family of faith-based international development organizations, which include Lutheran World Relief, CGA Technologies, Ground Up Investing and Farmers Market Brands LLC.

Daniel V. Speckhard serves as president and CEO for IMA World Health, headquartered in Washington, D.C., United States. IMA is a member of the Core Group for Child Survival, the Global Health Council, and the Partnership for Quality Medical Donations. In addition, IMA is registered with the U.S. Agency for International Development (USAID).

== History ==
IMA World Health, also known as Interchurch Medical Assistance, was formed in 1960 as a coalition of a number of faith-based relief and development agencies. IMA's aim was to centralize and oversee requests for gifts-in-kind from pharmaceutical and medical supply manufacturers and appropriately channel them to healthcare facilities, refugee centers, and disaster relief programs. The organization began distributing the donations from a warehouse in Maryland. The warehouse was operated by one of IMA's sponsors, the Church of the Brethren. To date, the organization has managed over $1 billion in supplies and shipped them to 52 countries.

In addition to the distribution of needed medical supplies, IMA has provided medical services to people in areas devastated by civil strife and natural disaster. In 2010, three of the agency's own employees, including then-CEO Rick Santos, narrowly escaped death while working to end Lymphatic Filariasis (Elephantiasis) in Haiti. The workers spent 50 hours trapped in the rubble of a hotel in Port-au-Prince after an earthquake struck the region, but they were ultimately rescued. The organization responded to the disaster by providing medicine boxes and hygiene kits.

In the late 1990s, IMA World Health expanded its efforts to include the management of healthcare service projects in developing nations. The organization worked to build basic health systems and services, control diseases including HIV/AIDS and NTDs (Neglected Tropical Diseases), and foster local faith-based support. IMA also recruits personnel to serve in areas of need. Its workers are involved in projects in the Democratic Republic of Congo, Haiti, Southern Sudan, and Tanzania.
