= Tuve Hasselquist =

Swedish American Lutheran minister (1816–1891)

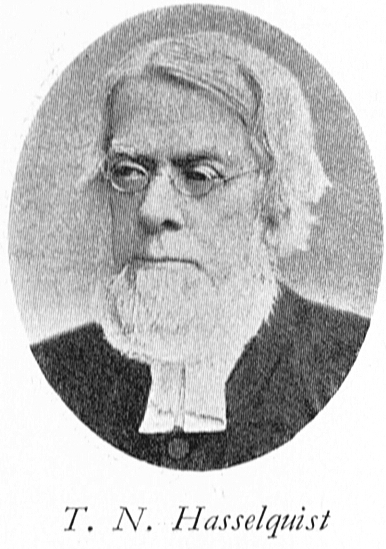
- Native name: Tuve (or Tufve) Hasselqvist
- Church: Scandinavian Evangelical Lutheran Augustana Synod in North America
- Other post: President of Augustana College (Illinois)

Orders
- Ordination: 1839

Personal details
- Born: Tuve Nilsson; March 2, 1816 Hasslaröd, Osby Municipality, Sweden
- Died: February 4, 1891 (aged 74) Rock Island, Illinois, United States
- Spouse: Eva Helena Cervin (m. 1852; died 1881)
- Education: Lund University

Tuve Nilsson Hasselquist (Note: also spelled Tufve and Hasselqvist) (March 2, 1816 – February 4, 1891), also known as T. N., was a Swedish American Lutheran minister and church leader. He was the second president of Augustana College, serving from 1863 until his death in 1891.

== Biography ==
Hasselquist was born in Hasslaröd (present Osby Municipality, Skåne County) in Sweden, to Nils Tufvesson and Sissa Svensdotter. The local parish priest convinced the father to send his son for further education, so he studied at a school in Kristianstad as a teenager, taking the surname Hasselquist. He enrolled at Lund University in 1835; while studying there, he was influenced by the Pietist Läsare movement, including Schartauanism, as well as the growing temperance movement and Peter Wieselgren's preaching. Hasselquist was ordained as a minister in the Church of Sweden by Bishop Faxe in Lund in 1839. He served as assistant pastor at several different churches in Skåne over the following thirteen years, becoming a revivalist and critical of the state church. He was known for his zeal and also spoke on the temperance issue together with Wieselgren.

Fellow Lutheran pastor Lars Paul Esbjörn arrived in Andover, Illinois, from Sweden in 1849 as the first Swedish Lutheran minister in the Upper Midwest. The church he founded in Galesburg, Illinois, was in need of a pastor after Gustaf Palmquist, who had initially had the role, openly became Baptist. Hasselquist was thus called from Åkarp Church, in Skåne, Sweden in late 1851, as well as pastor Erland Carlsson. On May 24, 1852, he married Eva Helena Cervin. The couple would have four children: Hanna, Nathanael, Joshua, and Esther. He immigrated to the United States the same year.

He initially served as a pastor in Galesburg. The first years were difficult: he and his wife shared a meager shanty with an argumentative couple and the congregation, more Congregationalist than Lutheran, was torn by differences in beliefs as the Swedish immigrants were divided among Methodists, Baptists, Lutherans, and the former Janssonists. He helped the growing church raise funds for a church building and after some time ended up as the leader of four congregations. During this time, he also performed missionary work, traveling as far as New York and founding congregations.

From 1855 until 1859, Hasselquist also served as founding editor and publisher of the first successful Swedish-language newspaper in America, Hemlandet. He also published Det rätta hemlandet as well as Augustana, the Augustana Synod's newspaper. Due to the demands of his work, he divested himself of his printing supplies, leading to the founding of the Swedish Lutheran Publication Society as a publishing house for Swedish-language books, hymnals and other Lutheran publications. Through his publishing work, however, he "came to lead the political opinion among the Swedish immigrants" – many joined the Republican Party – and he advocated for the abolition of slavery.

Swedish Lutherans including Hasselquist, Esbjörn, Carlsson, and Jonas Swensson organized the Augustana Evangelical Lutheran Church in the Jefferson Prairie Settlement in 1860. Hasselquist became the founding president of the Augustana Synod and remained in that capacity through 1870.

In 1863, Hasselquist became the second president of Augustana College in Paxton, Illinois. He strove to solidify the place of the college in the life of its church. He also helped financially support the education of Johannes Telleen there, who would later play an important role in the denomination. In 1875, under Hasselquist's leadership, Augustana College was moved to Rock Island, Illinois, which was a more central location among the growing number of Augustana Synod congregations. Hasselquist continued to function as the president of Augustana College until 1891, the year of his death.

He was awarded an honorary doctorate of divinity by Muhlenberg College and received the Order of the Polar Star from the King of Sweden.

== Other sources ==
- Benson, Adolph B. and Naboth Hedin, eds. (1938) Swedes in America, 1638-1938 (The Swedish American Tercentenary Association. New Haven, CT: Yale University Press) ISBN 978-0-8383-0326-9
- Gross, Ernie. This Day in Religion. New York: Neil-Schuman Publishers, 1990. ISBN 1-55570-045-4.
- Olson, Ernst W. and Martin J. Engberg History of the Swedes in Illinois - In Three Parts (printed by the Engberg-Holmberg Publishing Company. Chicago: 1908)
