= Swedish Lutheran Publication Society =

American Swedish-language publisher

The Swedish Lutheran Publication Society was a publishing organization which was founded by Tuve Hasselquist in Galesburg, Illinois. It was then reorganized and moved to Chicago in 1859. It was severely damaged in the Chicago fire of 1871, but the society and its successors were responsible for publishing most of the Swedish-language books in the United States in the era. Beginning in the late 1850s, the society published periodicals, first the Minnesota Posten and later the originally independent Det Rätta Hemlandet which moved beyond church news, becoming a political newspaper later in the 19th century.

The society's publications were mostly hymnals and other Lutheran church materials.
