= Jenny Lind Chapel =

Historic church in Illinois, United States

- U.S. National Register of Historic Places
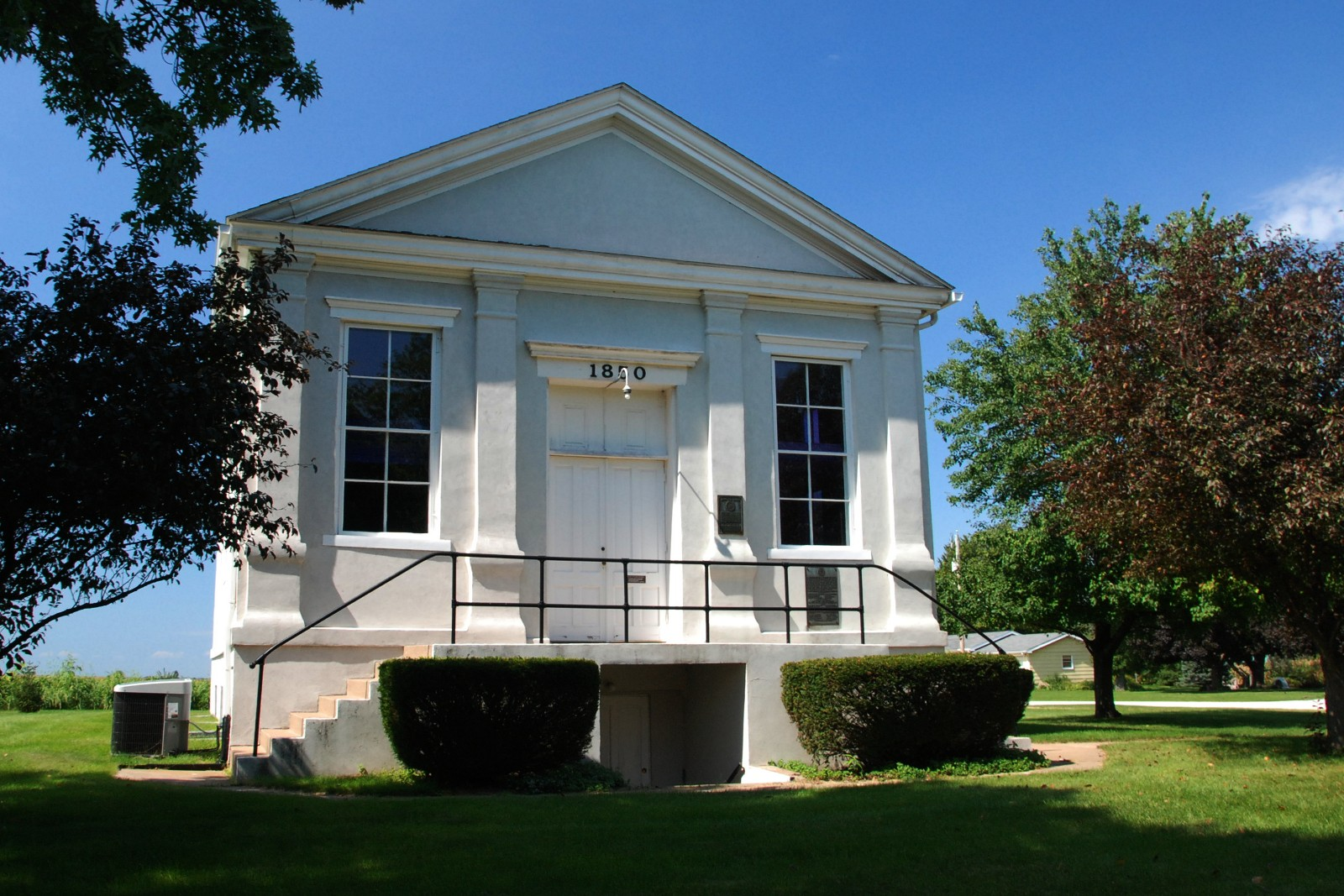

- Location within Illinois Location within the United States
- Location: SW corner 6th and Oak Sts., Andover, Illinois
- Coordinates: 41°17′29″N 90°17′56″W
- Area: 0.5 acres (0.20 ha)
- Built: 1851
- Architectural style: Greek Revival
- NRHP reference No.: 75000661
- Added to NRHP: April 1, 1975

The Jenny Lind Chapel is a historic church located at the southwest corner of 6th and Oak Streets in Andover, Illinois. Completed in 1851 for a congregation founded the previous year, the church was the first built by the Augustana Synod, the main Swedish Lutheran church in America. Pastor Lars Paul Ebsjorn founded the church for local Swedes who still wished to worship with the Church of Sweden; many were former members of the nearby Bishop Hill Colony who had lost faith in Eric Jansson's teachings, while the others were Swedes who had immigrated to the area due to the colony's fame. The church was named in honor of Swedish opera singer Jenny Lind, who donated $1,500 for its construction. The building has a simple design with Greek Revival features, a common form for small rural churches of the era.

The church was added to the National Register of Historic Places on April 1, 1975.
