= Hemlandet =

1855 Swedish-American newspaper

Hemlandet, alternately Gamla och nya hemlandet, was a Swedish-American newspaper begun in 1855 in Galesburg, Illinois. It was the first Swedish-language newspaper in America.

Founded by Lutheran minister Tuve Hasselquist, the newspaper moved to Chicago in 1859 along with his Swedish Lutheran Publication Society. Its original content was primarily religious, but when P. A. Sundelius became its editor in the late 1860s, its coverage on general issues began to change from denominational to more political. In 1869, Sundelius left for another Swedish-language newspaper, Svenska Amerikanaren.

Johan Alfred Enander (1842–1910) subsequently became the editor-in-chief. Over time, Enander became publisher of Hemlandet. During the 40 years he spent editing Hemlandet, he helped change the weekly church periodical into a general newspaper for Swedish-Americans.

After Enander's death, the newspaper was bought by C. S. Peterson; it was sold to Svenska Amerikanaren and became Svenska amerikanaren hemlandet for a short period before returning to the name Svenska Amerikanaren.

== Det rätta hemlandet ==
In 1856, Hasselquist also founded the publication Det rätta hemlandet ('The True Homeland'). Its focus was primarily religious, in contrast to Hemlandet. It later became Rätta Hemlandet och Missionsbladet with an emphasis on mission work and merged with Augustana, another of Hasselquist's publications, in 1869, becoming Rätta Hemlandet och Augustana.

== Related reading ==
- Olson, Ernest W. (1908) History of the Swedes of Illinois (Engberg-Holmberg Publishing. Chicago)
