= International Institute of Minnesota =

- Logo of International Institute of Minnesota
- Formation: 1919
- Headquarters: St. Paul, Minnesota
- Executive Director: Jane Graupman
- Website: https://iimn.org/

The International Institute of Minnesota (IIMN) is a social service agency affiliated with United Way Worldwide and the U.S. Committee for Refugees and Immigrants.

The institute was founded on December 12, 1919 as a branch of the YWCA (Young Women's Christian Association) of Saint Paul, Minnesota to help immigrants arriving after World War I. The institute supports immigrants and their families through job placement, citizenship classes, English language classes and refugee resettlement. The institute also offers legal and humanitarian services. In 1931, Alice Sickels became the institute's first executive director and a year later the IIMN hosted its first Festival of Nations. In 1938, the institute became an independent agency. Between that year and 1979, it resettled more than 24,000 refugees from around the world. During the Ethiopian Civil War and the 1983–1985 Famine in Ethiopia, the agency helped facilitate the transfer of Oromo refugees from African refugee camps to sponsor's homes in the Twin Cities, along with Lutheran missionary groups like the Lutheran Social Service and Lutheran World Relief. From 1974 to 2020, the IIMN resettled more than 25,000 refugees.

During the 2019 Festival of Nations the IIMN had presented a demonstration stage, a showcase of dance and music from around the world. Nearly 100 different ethnic groups participate in the annual event.
