= Andover, Illinois =

Andover
- Village
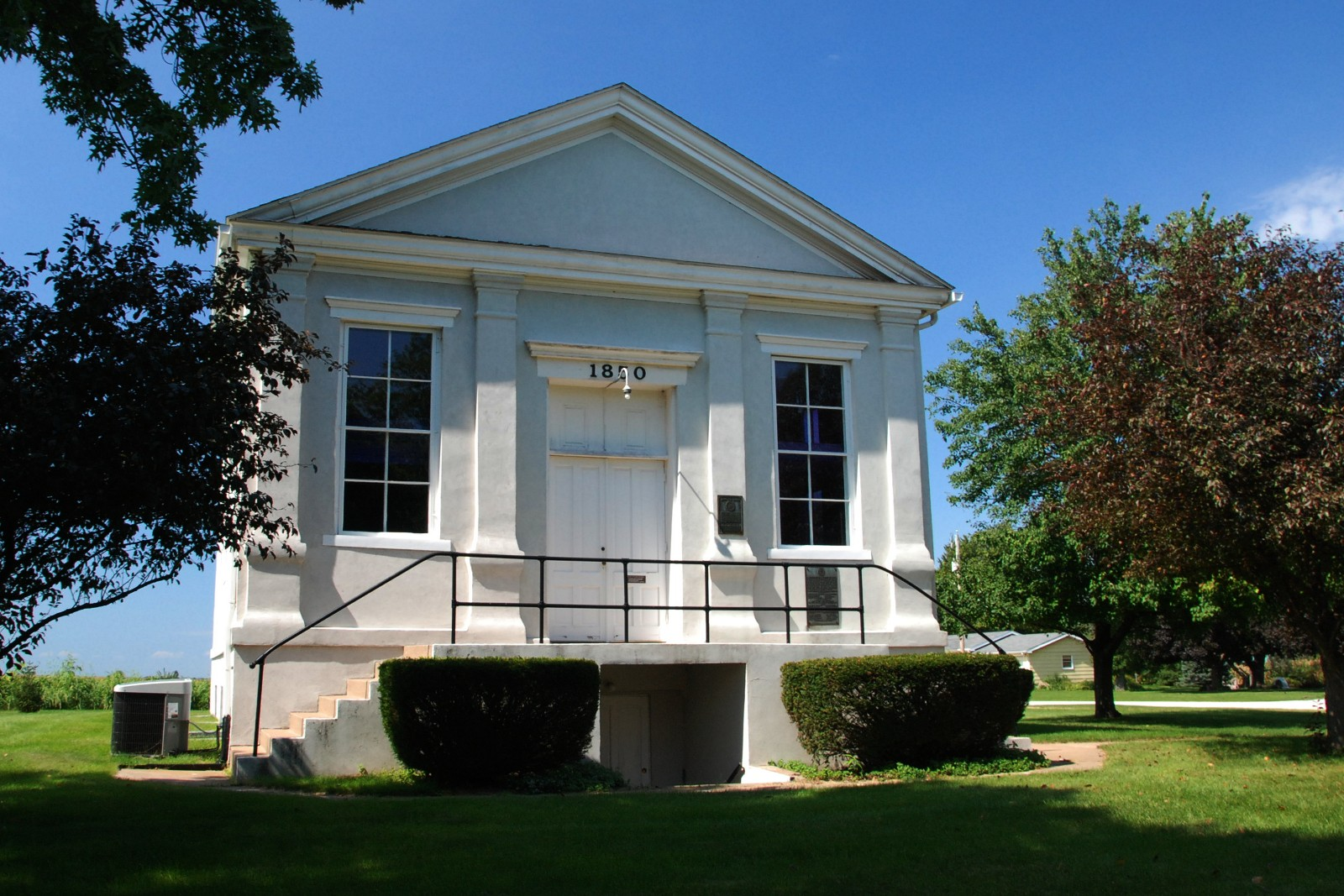
- Jenny Lind Chapel in Andover

- Location of Andover in Henry County, Illinois.

- Location in Illinois Andover (the United States) Andover (North America)
- Coordinates: 41°17′42″N 90°17′27″W
- Country: United States
- State: Illinois
- County: Henry

Area
  - Total: 0.99 sq mi (2.57 km^{2})
  - Land: 0.99 sq mi (2.57 km^{2})
  - Water: 0 sq mi (0.00 km^{2})
- Elevation: 768 ft (234 m)

Population (2020)
  - Total: 555
  - Density: 560/sq mi (216.2/km^{2})
- Time zone: UTC-6 (CST)
  - Summer (DST): UTC-5 (CDT)
- ZIP code: 61233
- Area code: 309
- FIPS code: 17-01491
- GNIS feature ID: 2397962
- Website: www.andoveril.org

Andover is a village in Henry County, Illinois, United States. The population was 555 at the 2020 census, down from 578 in 2010 census.

== History ==
Ithamar Pillsbury's gravestone, Andover Presbyterian Cemetery

Andover is the oldest community in Henry County. Andover was the first area to be settled as a town within the county and the first mill was built in 1836–37. Andover soon became a hub of wagon trails.

Andover was founded in September 1835 by the Reverend Ithamar Pillsbury, as an agent for the Andover Colony. Pillsbury, who had been a corporal in the War of 1812 attached in the New Hampshire military, narrowly escaping death in the war which had convinced him to become a Presbyterian minister.

Lars Paul Esbjörn, a Swedish Lutheran minister in the United States, and a group of Swedish immigrants arrived in Andover during 1849. Together they built Jenny Lind Chapel, which became the "mother church" of the Swedish Lutheran community. The church was built with funding provided mainly by the Swedish singer, Jenny Lind, while she was at that time on a concert tour in the eastern United States. The cemetery adjacent to the chapel is the resting place of Jonas Swensson, the second president of the Augustana Synod.

After remodeling in 1948, Jenny Lind Chapel was dedicated as a shrine of the Augustana Evangelical Lutheran Church. In 1975, Jenny Lind Chapel was declared to be a National Historic Site and was listed in the National Register of Historic Places.

== Geography ==
According to the 2021 census gazetteer files, Andover has a total area of 0.99 square miles (2.56 km^{2}), all land.

== Demographics ==
Historical population
Census	Pop.	Note	%±
1880	302		—
1890	259		−14.2%
1900	238		−8.1%
1910	222		−6.7%
1920	281		26.6%
1930	197		−29.9%
1940	248		25.9%
1950	256		3.2%
1960	295		15.2%
1970	420		42.4%
1980	612		45.7%
1990	579		−5.4%
2000	594		2.6%
2010	578		−2.7%
2020	555		−4.0%
U.S. Decennial Census

As of the 2020 census there were 555 people, 185 households, and 135 families residing in the village. The population density was 560.04 inhabitants per square mile (216.23/km^{2}). There were 242 housing units at an average density of 244.20 per square mile (94.29/km^{2}). The racial makeup of the village was 95.68% White, 0.00% African American, 0.18% Native American, 0.00% Asian, 0.00% Pacific Islander, 0.90% from other races, and 3.24% from two or more races. Hispanic or Latino of any race were 1.44% of the population.

There were 185 households, out of which 36.2% had children under the age of 18 living with them, 58.38% were married couples living together, 11.35% had a female householder with no husband present, and 27.03% were non-families. 24.32% of all households were made up of individuals, and 11.89% had someone living alone who was 65 years of age or older. The average household size was 2.96 and the average family size was 2.49.

The village's age distribution consisted of 26.5% under the age of 18, 4.3% from 18 to 24, 30.4% from 25 to 44, 19.4% from 45 to 64, and 19.3% who were 65 years of age or older. The median age was 41.8 years. For every 100 females, there were 128.9 males. For every 100 females age 18 and over, there were 100.0 males.

The median income for a household in the village was $57,344, and the median income for a family was $75,288. Males had a median income of $53,542 versus $31,250 for females. The per capita income for the village was $26,524. No families and 1.1% of the population were below the poverty line, including none of those under age 18 and none of those age 65 or over.

== Education ==
The majority of the municipal limits is in the Orion Community Unit School District 223. Small pieces are in the Cambridge Community Unit School District 227.
