= Burnside Township, Goodhue County, Minnesota =

American municipal area

Coordinates: 44°34′4″N 92°37′3″W

Burnside Township was a township in Goodhue County, Minnesota, United States until June 1, 1971, when the city of Red Wing annexed the township's entirety.

== History ==
Burnside Township was settled in 1854 and organized in 1858. It was first known as Union, then Milton from 1859 to 1861; finally, it was renamed Burnside in 1861, in honor of Ambrose E. Burnside. The ghost town of Burnside was settled in 1853, and became part of Prairie Island Indian Community in 1908.

Today, several places named Burnside exist within the city of Red Wing, including Burnside Cemetery and Burnside School.
