= Emmy Evald =

Swedish-American philanthropist and teacher

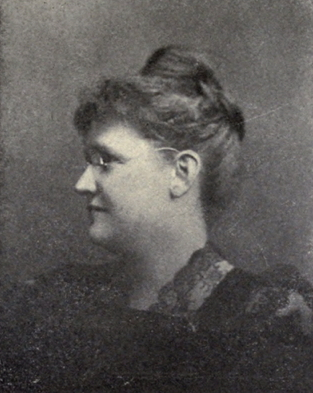
Emmy Evald

Emmy Christine Evald née Carlsson (18 September 1857, Geneva, Illinois — 10 December 1946, New York City) was a Swedish-American philanthropist, teacher and feminist. Educated in both Sweden and the United States, she is remembered as a founding member and president of the Augustana Women's Missionary Society, established in Lindsborg, Kansas, in 1892. Evald was also president of the Lutheran Woman's International League and was housemistress for the Lutheran Home for Women in New York City where she spent her final years.
