= Lars Paul Esbjörn =

Swedish-American Lutheran pastor (1808–1870)

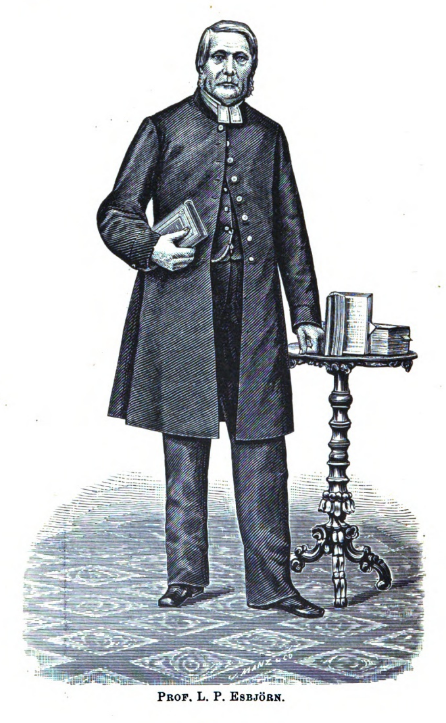
- Lars Paul Esbjörn, woodcut from 1880.
- Church: Augustana Evangelical Lutheran Church

Orders
- Consecration: 1832

Personal details
- Born: Lars Paul Esbjörnsson; October 16, 1808 Delsbo, Sweden
- Died: July 2, 1870 (aged 61) Östervåla, Sweden
- Buried: Östervåla Church
- Spouse: Lovisa Amalia Maria Planting-Gyllenbåga (m. 1836; died 1852) Helena Catharina Magnusson (m. 1853; died 1853) Gustafva Albertina Magnusson (m. 1853)
- Children: 10, including: Constantin Magnus Esbjorn; Carl Linus Eugene Esbjorn; Maria Rediviva Esbjorn
- Occupation: Priest, academic, church leader

Lars Paul Esbjörn (October 16, 1808 – July 2, 1870) was a Swedish-American Lutheran clergyman, academic and church leader. Esbjörn was a founder of the Augustana Evangelical Lutheran Church and of Augustana College. He served as the first president of Augustana College from 1860 until his resignation in 1863.

== Background ==
Lars Paul Esbjörn was born to tailor Esbjörn Paulsson and Karin Lindström in Delsbo and schooled in Hudiksvall, both in Hälsingland, Sweden. His last name was originally Esbjörnsson, which he later shortened to Esbjörn. He grew up poor, and after his parents died when he was young, he was taken in by a neighbor. He was educated in Gävle and with the help of a patron, vicar Olof Hansson Forssell, studied theology at Uppsala University. He was ordained at Uppsala Cathedral in 1832, became curate at Östervåla parish in Uppsala County, then chaplain at the Swedish Oslättfors Iron Works and schoolteacher and curate at Hille parish in Gävleborg County. In 1836 he married Lovisa Amalia Maria Planting-Gyllenbåga.

His beliefs took influence from the Pietist Läsare (Reader) movement, including Carl Olof Rosenius, Peter Wieselgren, and Methodist George Scott. In 1840, after having been a priest for several years, he would experience what he called his conversion through one of Scott's revival meetings, in which he came to "living faith". He formed a close friendship with Scott. Esbjörn also became actively involved in the temperance movement, meeting American clergyman and temperance activist Robert Baird while Baird was visiting Sweden that year. At one point, he had to face the court due to "quite resolutely" taking barrels of brännvin from people.

His eager involvement with these non-Lutheran elements both caused controversy and "diminished [his] chances of promotion within the Swedish Church." Being denied for several posts furthered his resolve to emigrate. Through Baird he learned of the potential for work in the United States.

Esbjörn also saw the potential to serve as a pastor to the many new Swedish emigrants in the United States:

Since after the Janssonite emigration in 1846 many Swedes went to the new world in the following years but without any priest following them, I felt challenged to move there myself in order to help them spiritually so that they and their children might not fall into heathenism or because of the lack of spiritual help become torn away from their own church and find themselves in one of the new world’s more or less heretical sects.

== Ministry ==
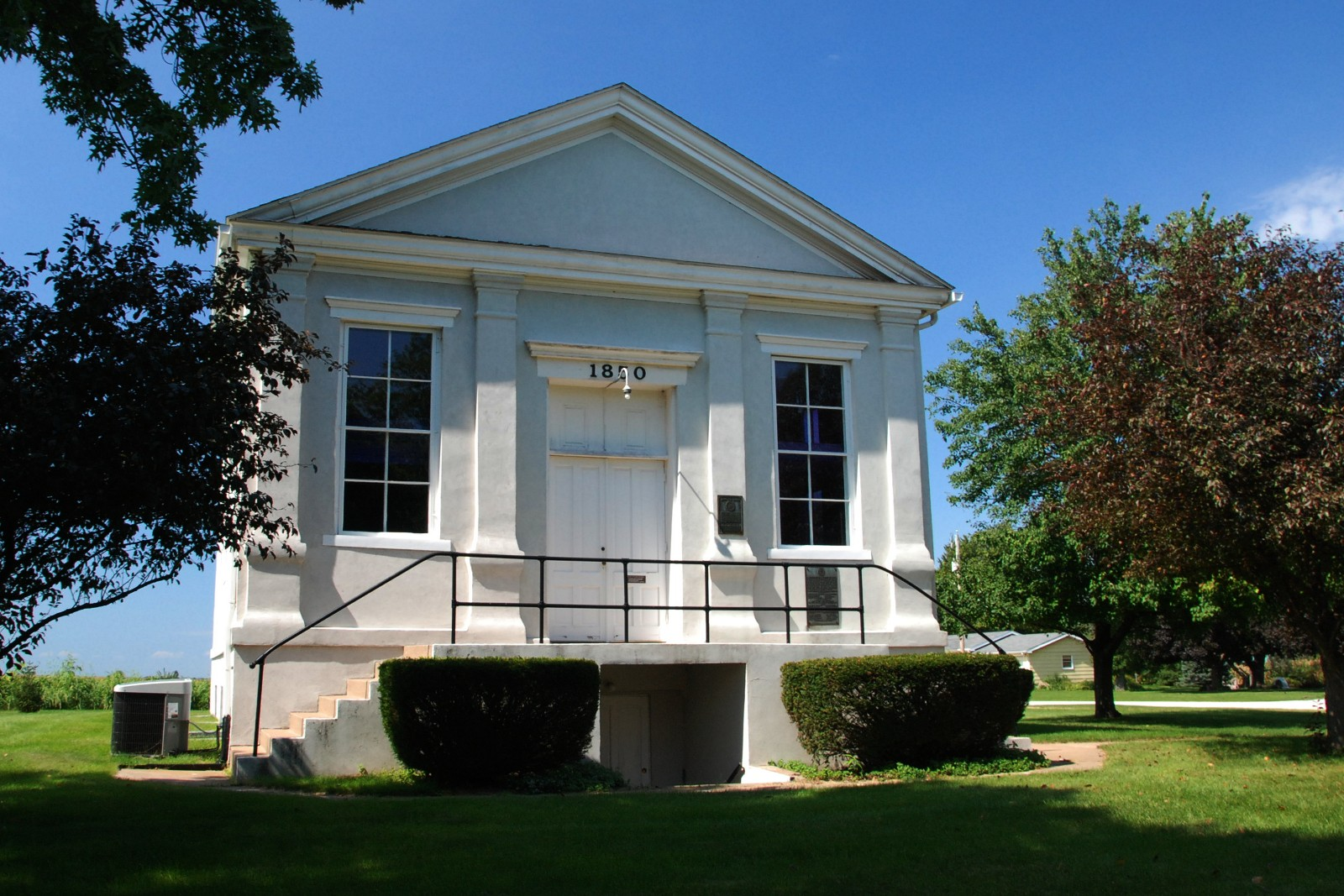
Jenny Lind Chapel in Andover, Illinois

Esbjörn and a group of 146 Swedish immigrants sailed from Gävle to New York City in 1849; two of his children died on the journey. Only Esbjörn and a handful of his followers arrived in Andover, Illinois. His decision at this point to remain Lutheran is described by one scholar: "In New York Esbjörn was invited to join with the Swedish Methodists, but his wife's strong adherence to Lutheranism and his own disapproval of any church body that allowed slaveholders to be members argued against such an affiliation. In Illinois contact with the perfectionists [Janssonites] at Bishop Hill and with other non-Lutherans convinced him of a more definite Lutheran identity."

Together he and his followers built Jenny Lind Chapel, which became the center of the Swedish-American Lutheran community. The church was built with funding provided mainly by Jenny Lind, while she was at that time on a concert tour in the eastern United States.

Esbjörn would be Andover's pastor from 1850 to 1856. He followed some of the immigrants to Princeton, Illinois, in 1856 where he organized First Lutheran Church. Esbjörn divided his time between Andover and Princeton. The next year, the church he had founded in Galesburg needed a priest, and he convinced Gustaf Palmquist to take on the role. Palmquist, however, soon left for the Baptist church. Esbjörn then requested the help of Readers Tuve Hasselquist and Erland Carlsson, who came to the United States. The three were significant in the later founding of the Augustana Synod.

Esbjörn's first wife died in childbirth in 1852. The year after, he married Helena Catharina Magnusson, who died in 1853. He then married her sister, Gustafva Albertina Magnusson. He had a total of ten children, including Augustana College professors Constantin Magnus Esbjorn (1858–1911) and Carl Linus Eugene Esbjorn (1862–1939) and daughter Maria Rediviva Esbjorn, "the first woman delegate to an Augustana Synod conference of 1910".

Esbjörn was a professor of theology at Illinois State University in Springfield, Illinois, from 1858 to 1860. After a disagreement over doctrinal issues with many of the faculty, Esbjörn resigned and moved to Chicago. Along with other church leaders including Hasselquist, Carlsson, and Jonas Swensson, he organized the independent Augustana Synod of the Lutheran church at Jefferson Prairie Settlement in Wisconsin in 1860.

He was also fundamental in the beginnings of Augustana College. The college and seminary started in Chicago during 1860, moved to Paxton, Illinois, in 1863, and finally to Rock Island, Illinois, in 1875. Esbjörn served as the first president of Augustana College and Theological Seminary from 1860 to 1863, when it was based in Chicago. He opposed its move to rural Paxton, and the move, combined with an appointment in the Church of Sweden in his home diocese of Uppsala led Esbjörn to tender his resignation from the college.

Esbjörn then returned to Sweden in 1863 where he succeeded Johan Dillner as vicar of Östervåla. A relief of Esbjörn and his first wife Amalia carved and painted by Bror Hjorth hangs in Östervåla Church. When Esbjörn went to America, he introduced the psalmodicon, which facilitated the singing of hymns.

He died on July 2, 1870, and was buried in the cemetery of the Lutheran Church in Östervåla. On June 13, 1948, after remodeling, Jenny Lind Chapel was dedicated as a shrine of the Augustana Evangelical Lutheran Church. In 1975, Jenny Lind Chapel was listed on the National Register of Historic Places.
