= Augustana Evangelical Lutheran Church =

Defunct Christian denomination in the United States

- Classification: Lutheran
- Associations: National Lutheran Council
- Region: United States
- Origin: June 1860; Jefferson Prairie Settlement, Wisconsin
- Separations: Conference of the Norwegian-Danish Evangelical Lutheran Church of America (1870); Norwegian Augustana Synod (1870); Mission Friends
- Merged into: Lutheran Church in America (1962)
- Congregations: 1,219
- Members: 619,040
- Ministers: 1,353
- Other name(s): Scandinavian Evangelical Lutheran Augustana Synod in North America (1860–1870); Swedish Evangelical Lutheran Augustana Synod in North America (1870–1894); Evangelical Lutheran Augustana Synod in North America (1894–1948)

The Augustana Evangelical Lutheran Church (previously the Augustana Lutheran Synod and also Scandinavian Evangelical Lutheran Augustana Synod in North America and Swedish Evangelical Lutheran Augustana Synod in North America) was a Lutheran church body in the United States that was one of the churches that merged into the Lutheran Church in America (LCA) in 1962. It had its roots among the Swedish immigrants in the 19th century.

In 1961, just before its merger into the LCA, the Augustana Synod had 1,353 pastors, 1,219 congregations, and 619,040 members.

== Formation ==
The Scandinavian Evangelical Lutheran Augustana Synod in North America was established in 1860. The organizing meeting was held at the Jefferson Prairie Settlement, near Clinton, Wisconsin on June 5–8. A group of Swedish Lutheran pastors including Jonas Swensson, Lars Paul Esbjörn, Tuve Hasselquist, Eric Norelius, and Erland Carlsson pioneered development of the Augustana Synod.

Augustana is a shortened version of Confessio Augustana, the Latin name of one of Lutheranism's defining documents, the Augsburg Confession, presented in 1530 in the German city of Augsburg. Along with the Swedish members of the church were Norwegian and Danish members who left the church in 1870 to form the Conference of the Norwegian-Danish Evangelical Lutheran Church of America and the Norwegian Augustana Synod. Also in 1870, the synod was renamed the Swedish Evangelical Lutheran Augustana Synod in North America. In 1894 the name was changed to Evangelical Lutheran Augustana Synod in North America. In 1948, the name Augustana Evangelical Lutheran Church was adopted.

In 1922, the synod was given equal standing in Sweden with the Swedish synods.

Originally somewhat conservative, the church gradually turned more liberal after historical criticism was introduced at its seminary. The Augustana Theological Seminary was located on the campus of Augustana College in Rock Island, Illinois. It was later merged into the Lutheran School of Theology at Chicago upon the formation of the Lutheran Church in America in 1962.

Augustana Church was the direct parent of several liberal arts colleges in the United States: Augustana College in Rock Island, Illinois; Gustavus Adolphus College in St. Peter, Minnesota; Bethany College in Lindsborg, Kansas; California Lutheran University in Thousand Oaks, California; Midland University in Fremont, Nebraska; and the defunct Upsala College in East Orange, New Jersey. Augustana and Gustavus Adolphus consistently rank among the top 100 liberal arts colleges in the U.S., and the other institutions are recognized as strong regional colleges.

While the Augustana Church had only 600,000 members when the Lutheran Church in America was formed, its influence on its successor bodies has been significant as they incorporated many of Augustana's emphases on mission, ecumenism, and social service. Herbert W. Chilstrom, the first presiding bishop of the Evangelical Lutheran Church in America, was a graduate of the Augustana Theological Seminary and was ordained to Augustana's ministry in 1958. Included among the Augustana-founded congregations is Mount Olivet Lutheran Church in Minneapolis, Minnesota, the largest Lutheran congregation in the world with over 13,000 members.

== Presidents ==
- Tuve Hasselquist 1860–1870
- Jonas Swensson 1870–1873
- Eric Norelius 1874–1881
- Erland Carlsson 1881–1888
- Sven Peter August Lindahl 1888–1891
- P. J. Svärd 1891–1899
- Eric Norelius 1899–1911
- L. A. Johnston 1911–1918
- Gustaf Albert Brandelle 1918–1935
- Petrus Olaf Bersell 1935–1951
- Oscar A. Benson 1951–1959
- Malvin H. Lundeen 1959–1962

== Conferences ==
Name	Baptized members	Congregations
California Conference	38,682	76
Canada Conference	10,507	49
Central Conference	125,312	188
Columbia Conference	38,697	67
Iowa Conference	30,270	63
Minnesota Conference	182,374	300
Nebraska Conference	19,199	50
New England Conference	48,349	88
New York Conference	54,061	125
Red River Valley Conference	28,812	106
Superior Conference	20,974	63
Texas Conference	6,731	27
West Central Conference	25,579	61

Final statistics of the Augustana Evangelical Lutheran Church (December 31, 1961).
