= Linnéa =

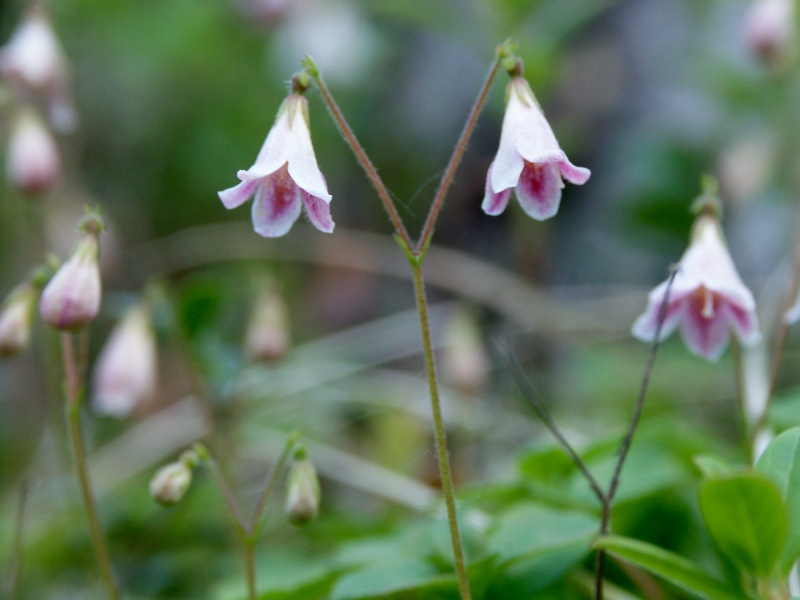
- The twinflower Linnaea borealis became a personal emblem for Linnaeus.
- Pronunciation: English: /lɪˈneɪə/ lin-AY-ə; Swedish: [lɪˈnêːa]
- Gender: female
- Language: Swedish

Other gender
- Masculine: Linnaeus, Linné

Origin
- Derivation: after botanist Carl Linnaeus
- Meaning: 'linden tree' or 'twinflower'

Other names
- Alternative spelling: Linnea, Lenae, Linea, Lynnea, Nea, Neea, Linna, Linnae, Linnaea, Lynae, Lynea, Lynnae, Lynnea, Lennea, Lenaya

Linnéa or Linnea is a female given name of Swedish origin.

It has two derivations, both of which are linked to the famous 18th-century Swedish scientist Carl Linnaeus, who was ennobled as Carl von Linné later in life. Primarily, people have named their children in his honor; Linnaeus and Linné have been used as given names, usually for boys, and simple modification makes the name gender female. Secondarily, people have named their children after the twinflower Linnaea, which was itself named to honor Linnaeus. Linnaeus' family name in turn is derived from the Swedish word lind, indicating the linden (lime tree).

Linnéa or Linnea was the seventh most popular given name for girls born in Sweden in 2008 and was the most popular name for girls born in 2008 in Norway. In 2013, it ranked 17 in Sweden and 7 in Norway.

== People with the name Linnéa ==
- Anni-Linnea Alanen (born 2002), Finnish javelin thrower
- Linnea Axelsson (born 1980), Sami Swedish art scholar, novelist and poet
- Linnéa Bäckman (born 1991), Swedish ice hockey player
- Linnea Berthelsen (born 1993), Danish actress
- Tove Linnea Brandvik (born 1968), Norwegian politician
- Linnea Ceder (born 2002), Finnish figure skater
- Linnéa Claeson (born 1992), Swedish human rights activist
- Linnea Dale (born 1991), Norwegian singer
- Linnea Deb (born 1977), Swedish singer, songwriter and record producer
- Linnéa Darell (born 1945), Swedish politician
- Linnéa Edgren (1904–1981), Swedish actress
- Linnea Ehri, American educational psychologist
- Linnéa Engström (born 1981), Swedish politician
- Linnea Glatt (born 1942), American artist
- Linnea Gonzales (born 1997), American field hockey player
- Linnea Gustafsson (born 1986), Swedish orienteering competitor
- Linnea Hedin (born 1995), Swedish ice hockey player
- Linnea Henriksson (born 1986), Swedish singer and songwriter
- Linnéa Handberg Lund (born 1976), Danish musician
- Linnéa Hillberg (1892–1977), Swedish actress
- Laura Linnea Jensen (born 1948), American poet
- Linnéa Johansson (born 2002), Swedish ice hockey player
- Linnea Johansson (golfer) (born 1993), Swedish golfer
- Linnea Johnson (born 1946), American poet and feminist
- Linnéa Jonasson (born 1997), Swedish footballer
- Linnea Liljegärd (born 1988), Swedish footballer
- Linnea Mellgren (born 1989), Swedish figure skater
- Linnea Mobärg (born 2001), Swedish freestyle skier
- Linnéa Myhre (born 1990), Norwegian author and blogger
- Linnea Olsson (born 1983), Swedish singer, songwriter, cellist and multi-instrumentalist
- Linnéa Olsson (born 1986), Swedish musician and songwriter
- Linnea Quigley (born 1958), American actress
- Linnea Quiñones (born 1980), Mexican footballer
- Linnea Regnander (born 1993), Swedish model
- Ann Linnea Sandberg (1938–2009), American immunologist
- Linnea Sinclair (born 1954), American science fiction romance author
- Linnea Södahl (born 1987), Swedish singer and songwriter
- Linnea Stensils (born 1994), Swedish canoeist
- Linnea Ström (born 1996), Swedish golfer
- Linnea Svensson (born 1999), Swedish footballer
- Linnea Torstensson (born 1983), Swedish handball player
- Linnea Weidemann (born 2003), German field hockey player
- Linnea Wester (née Pettersson; born 1995), Swedish handball player
- Linnéa Wickman (born 1992), Swedish politician

== See also ==
- IF Linnéa, a former sports club in Stockholm
- Linnea Hall, a building in Portland, Oregon
- Linnéas fina visor, a studio album by Cornelis Vreeswijk
- Linea (Stargate), a character from Stargate SG-1
