= Linnea Johansson =

Linnea Johansson may refer to:

- Linnéa Johansson (born 2002), Swedish ice hockey player
- Linnea Johansson (golfer) (born 1993), Swedish golfer

== See also ==
- Linnéa
- Johansson
- Linnea Johnson
- Linnéa Jonasson
