= Commemoration of Carl Linnaeus =

Celebrations of the Swedish biologist

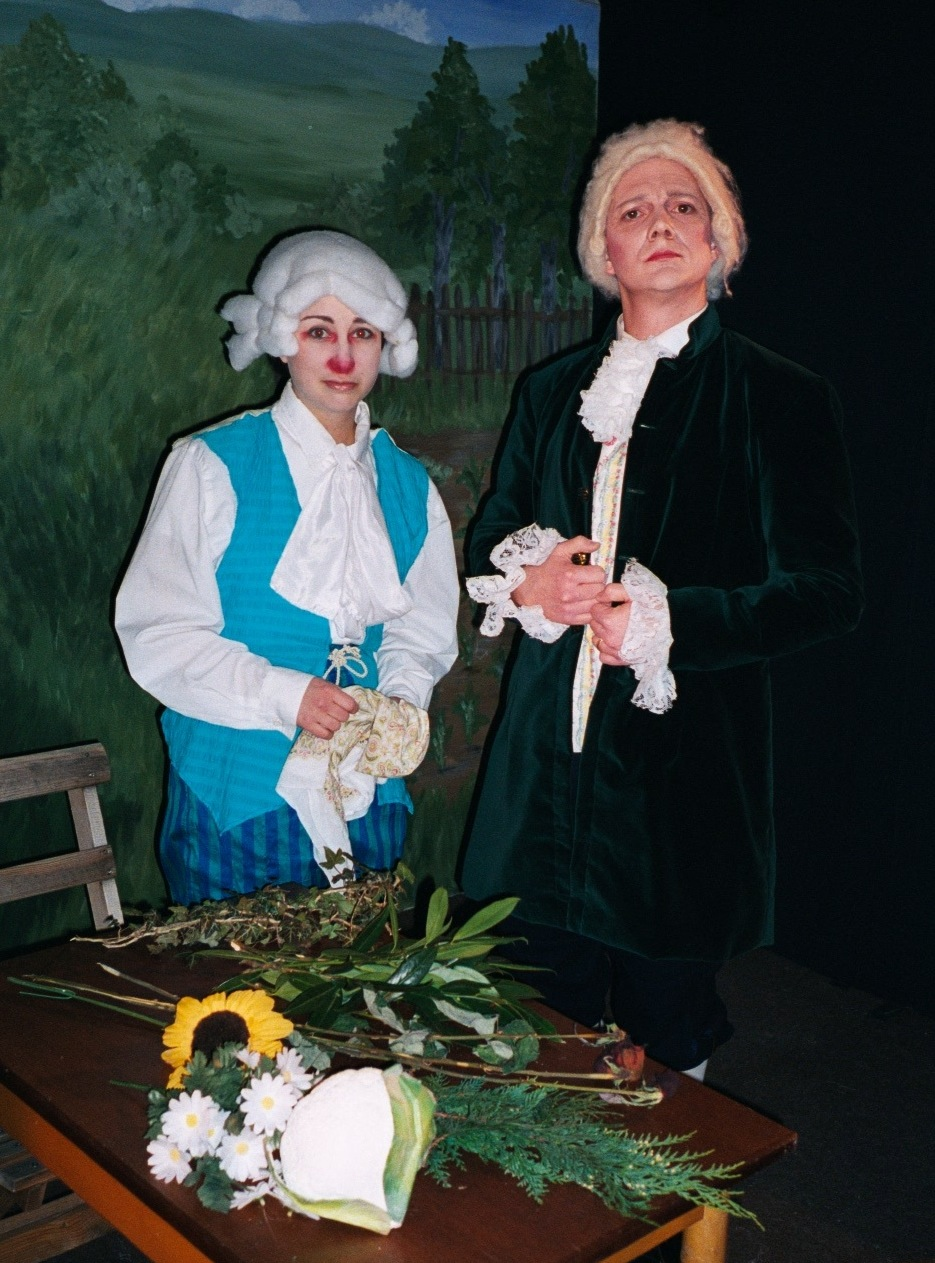
Spex (theatre) performance of Linné in Lund, 2001 (Note: Depicted are Linnaeus (right) with Erik Gustaf Lidbeck, one of his students.)

Commemoration of Carl Linnaeus has been ongoing for over two centuries. Celebrated for his scientific work, Linnaeus was knighted and granted nobility (as Carl von Linné) in life. After his death, he has been featured in sculpture, on postage stamps and banknotes, as well as by a medal from the eponymous Linnean Society of London. Several notable people have the given names Linnaeus/Linné (usually for boys) or Linnea/Linnéa (highly popular for girls born in Scandinavia). Among other things named in his honor are plants, astronomical features, towns, an arboretum, a mineral and a university.

== Accolades ==
By the end of his life in 1778, Carl Linnaeus had become one of the most acclaimed scientists in Europe, the first commoner in Sweden to be dubbed a knight of the Order of the Polar Star (1753) and ennobled as Carl von Linné (1761). The Swiss philosopher Jean-Jacques Rousseau wrote during Linnaeus' lifetime: "I know no greater man on earth."

The German writer Johann Wolfgang von Goethe would later write: "With the exception of Shakespeare and Spinoza, I know no one among the no longer living who has influenced me more strongly." Swedish author August Strindberg wrote: "Linnaeus was in reality a poet who happened to become a naturalist". Among other compliments, Linnaeus has been called the "Flower King", (Note: "Flower King" in Swedish is "Blomsterkungen" Note e.g. "Blomsterkungen - Barnbokhandeln". Archived from the original on 2012-03-28.) Princeps botanicorum (Prince of Botanists), "The Pliny of the North," and "The Second Adam".

In 1959, Carl Linnaeus was designated as the lectotype for Homo sapiens, which means that following the International Code of Zoological Nomenclature, Homo sapiens is validly defined as the animal species to which Linnaeus belongs.

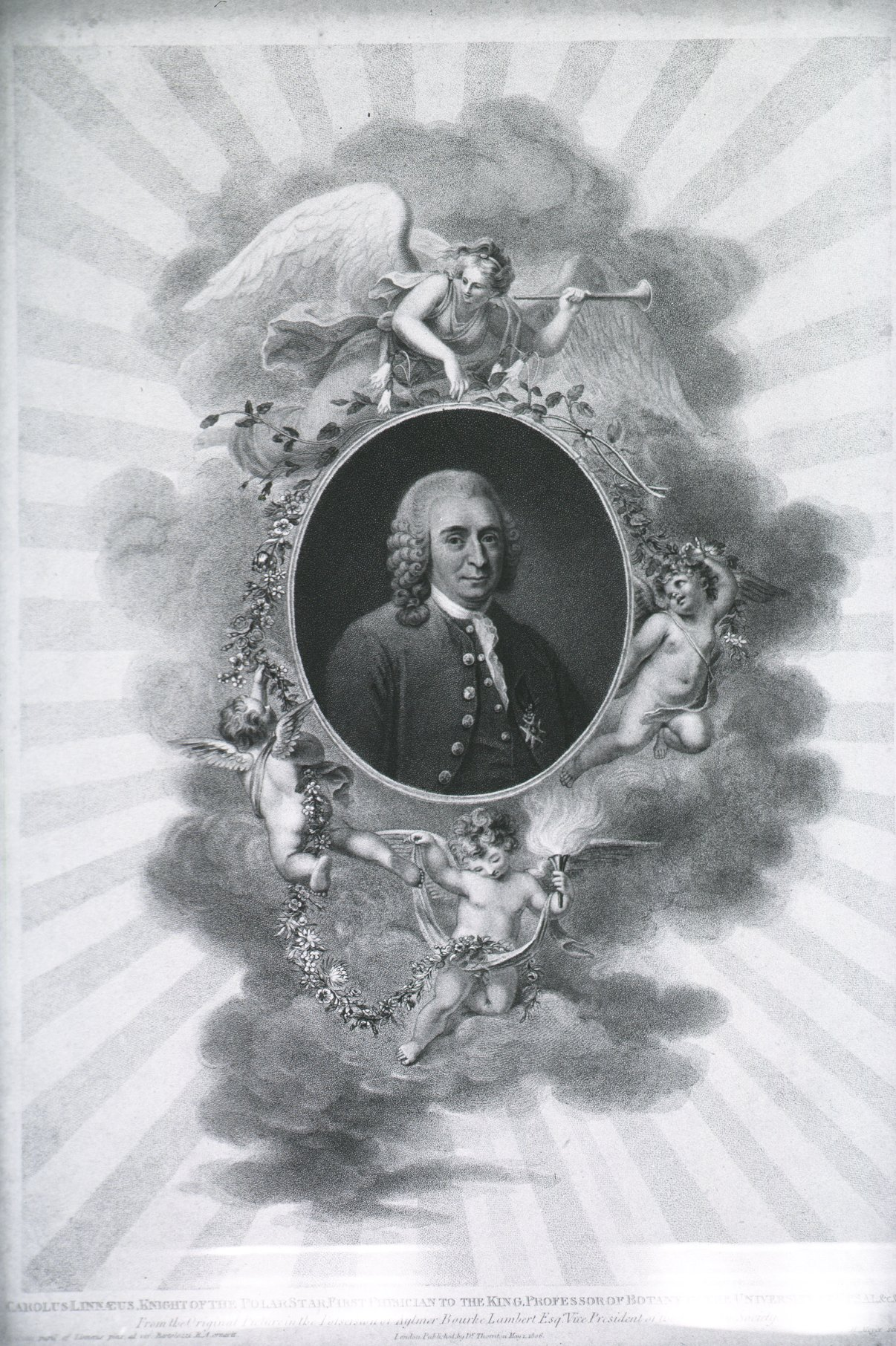
"Carolus Linnaeus, Knight of the Polar Star" (Note: Print from Temple of Flora (1799-1807) by Robert John Thornton.)

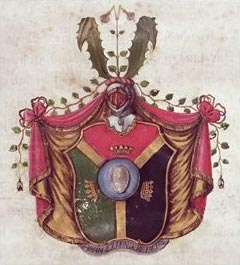
The coat of arms of Carl von Linné (Note: Linnaea borealis was a personal emblem for Linnaeus; he is often depicted holding a twinflower (e.g. in File:LinnaeusWeddingPortrait.jpg from 1739) and the von Linné coat of arms has one at the top.)

== Memorials, monuments and statues ==
The Royal Botanic Garden Edinburgh holds a monument to Linnaeus (Note: Media related to Linnaeus in sculpture at Wikimedia CommonsInteresting examples online with non-free content: The Linnaeus Monument in the Royal Botanic Garden Edinburgh; A bust of Linnaeus at Gustavus Adolphus College's Linnaeus Arboretum.; Statue in the Linnaeus Teaching Gardens: "Linnaeus Statue Photo Gallery". Archived from the original on 2011-07-17. "Linnaeus Statue". Archived from the original on 2011-07-17.; Stained glass depiction of Linnaeus at the All Saints' Chapel in Sewanee: The University of the South; A mid-19th century marble statue of The Young Linnaeus held by the Walker Art Gallery) designed in 1778 by the noted Scottish architect Robert Adam. It was originally erected in the Botanic Garden on Leith Walk in 1779 by John Hope, Regius Keeper of the Garden, who was the first to introduce the Linnean system of classification to Scotland. It has been located in the Chilean Terrace of RBGE since 1967.

There are numerous other memorials, monuments and statues of Linnaeus; some examples:

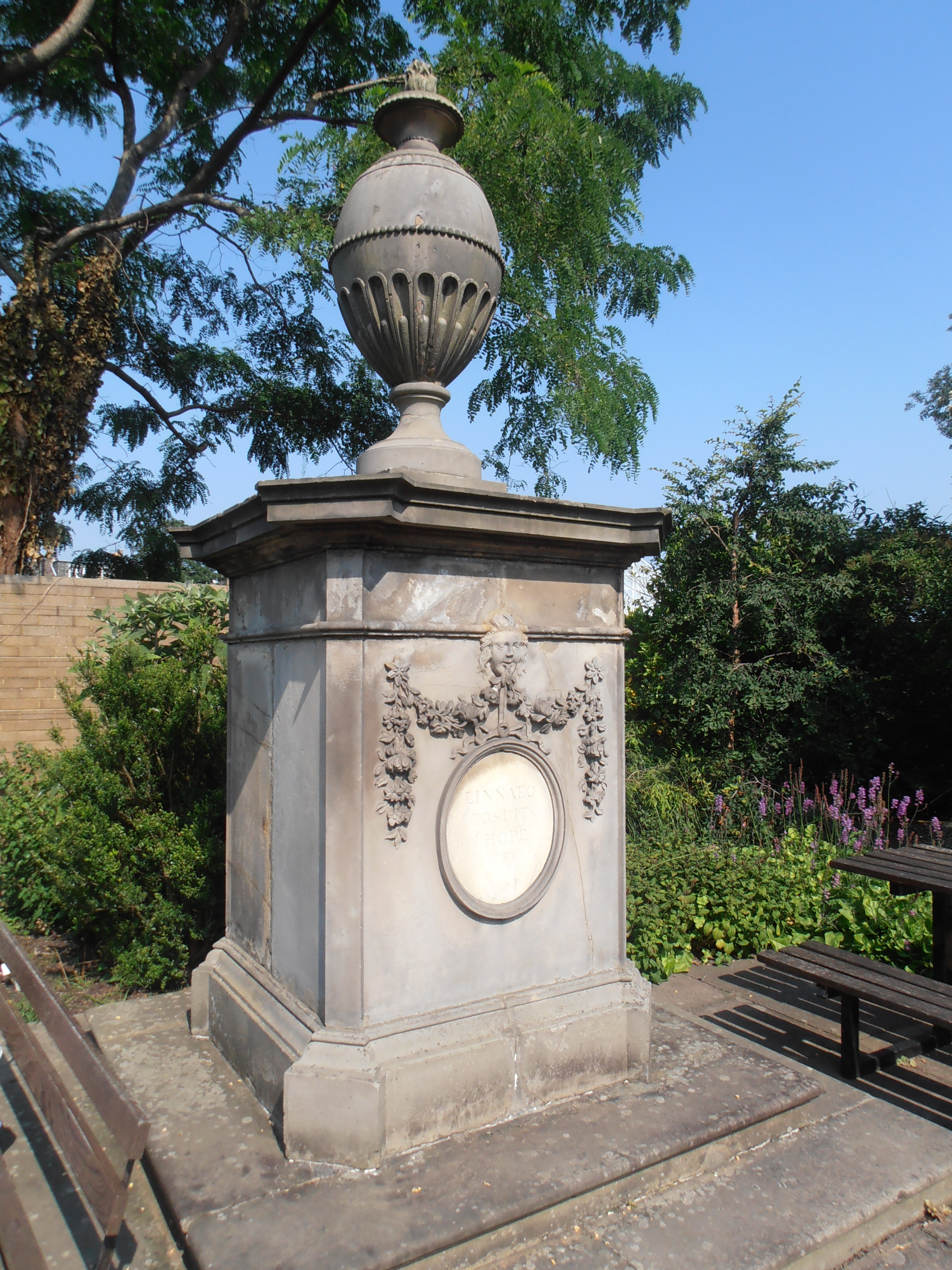
Monument by Robert Adam at Royal Botanic Garden in Edinburgh

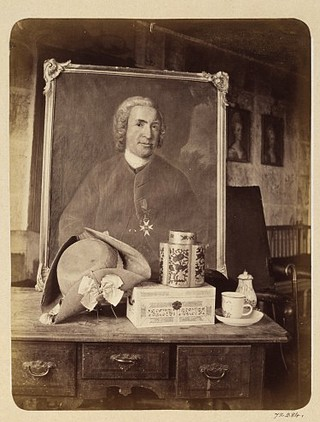
Hammarby, 1864 (Note: Photograph by Emma Schenson (1827-1913) at Linnaeus Hammarby, 1864. The memorial arrangement features a painting of Linnaeus by Johan Henrik Scheffel from 1755 (in line with the two female portraits on the wall in the background, possibly of Linnaeus' wife and mother), his hat, teacup, teapot, tea caddy and walking stick (leaning against a chair).)

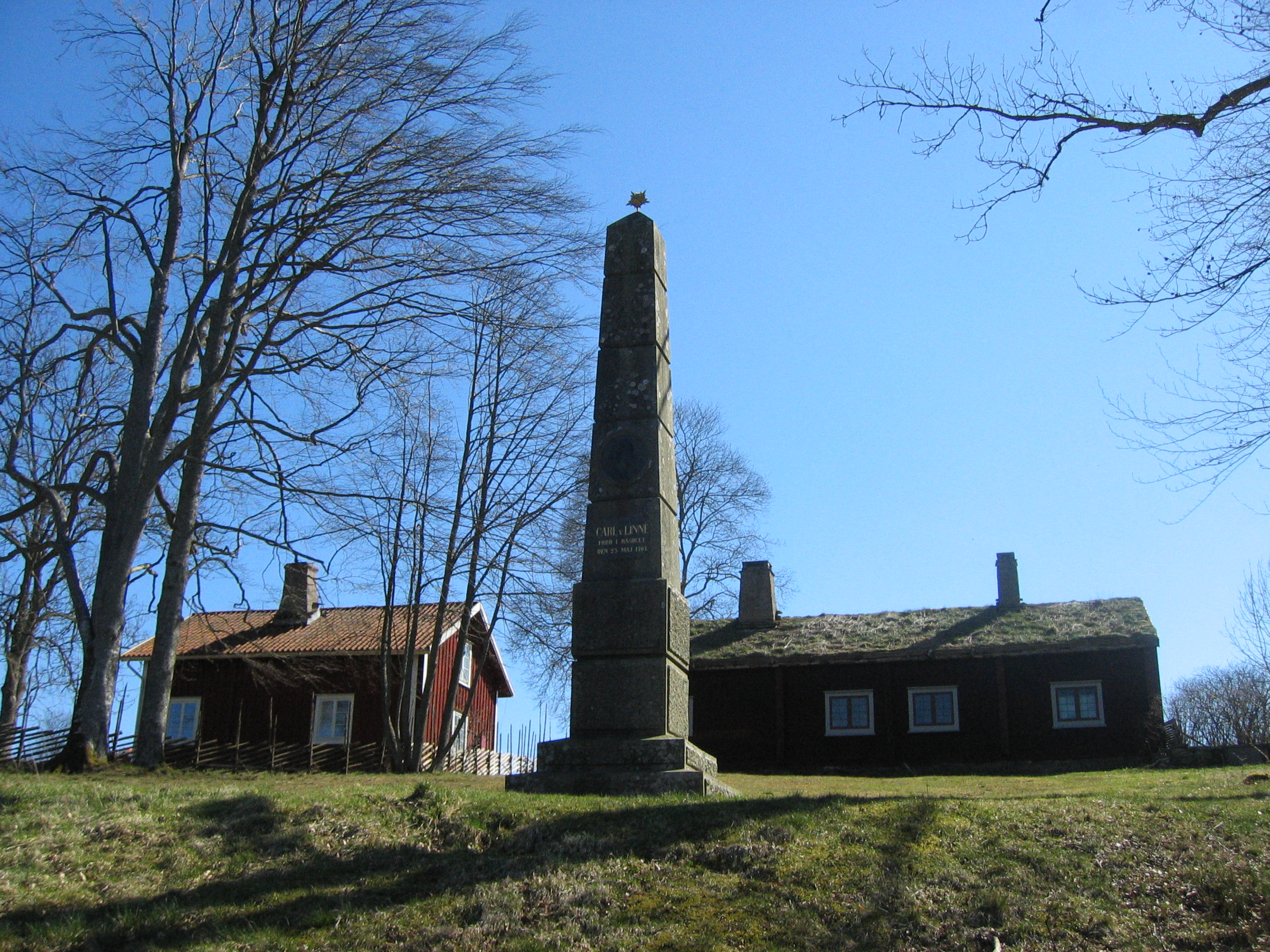
Monument to Linnaeus at his birthplace in Råshult

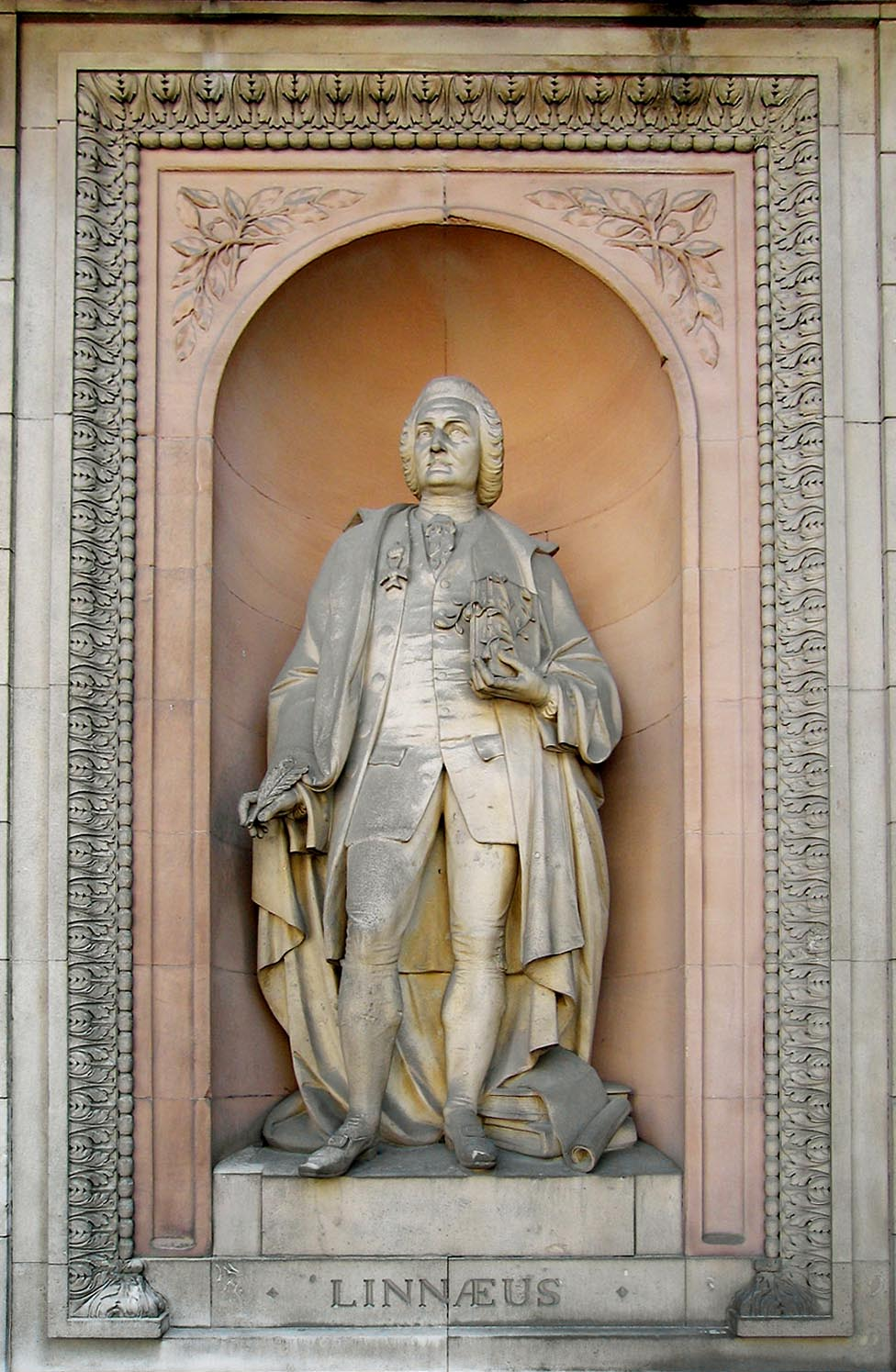
Statue of Linnaeus in the Royal Academy of London

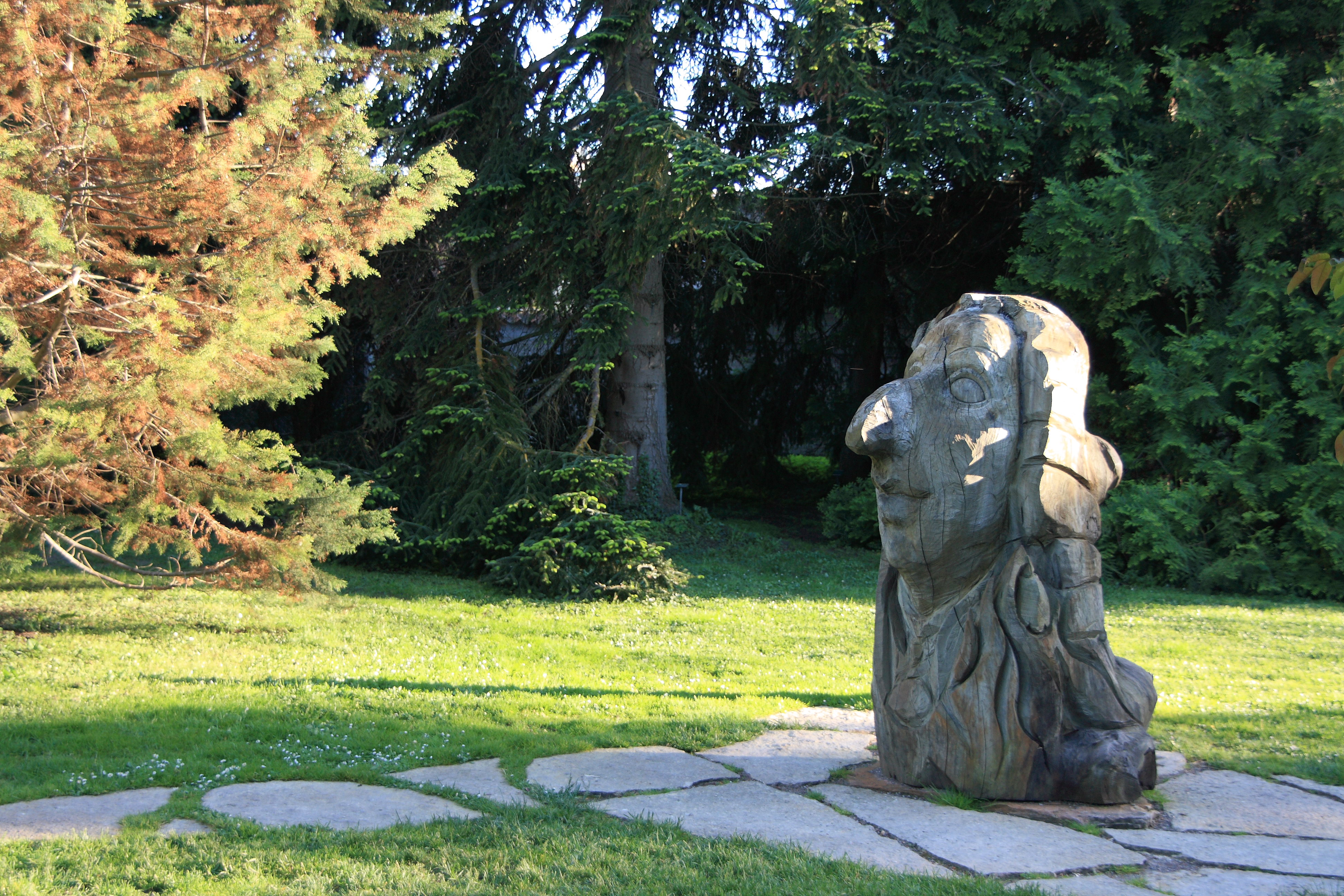
Carved wooden statue of Linnaeus in Visby

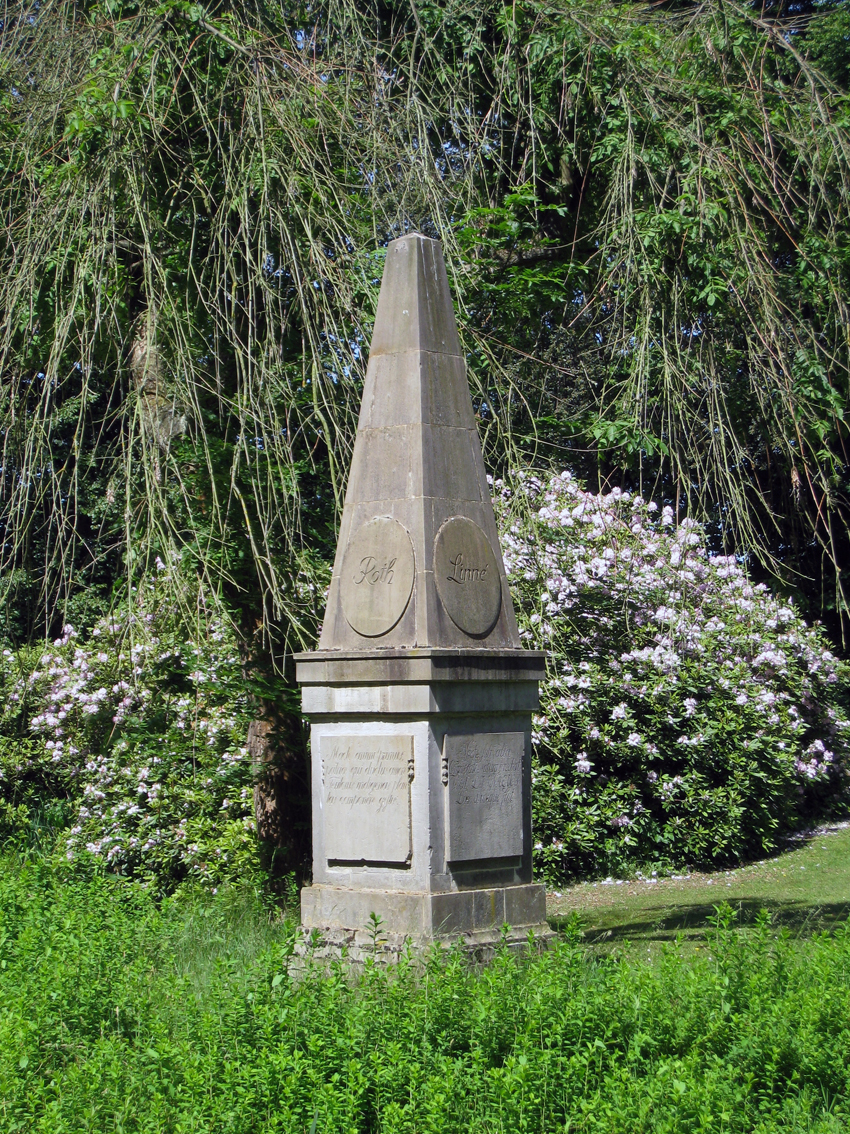
Early 19th century obelisk in Bremen (Note: The obelisk commemorates four naturalists, one per side: Linnaeus, Albrecht Wilhelm Roth, Albrecht von Haller and Nikolaus Joseph von Jacquin.)

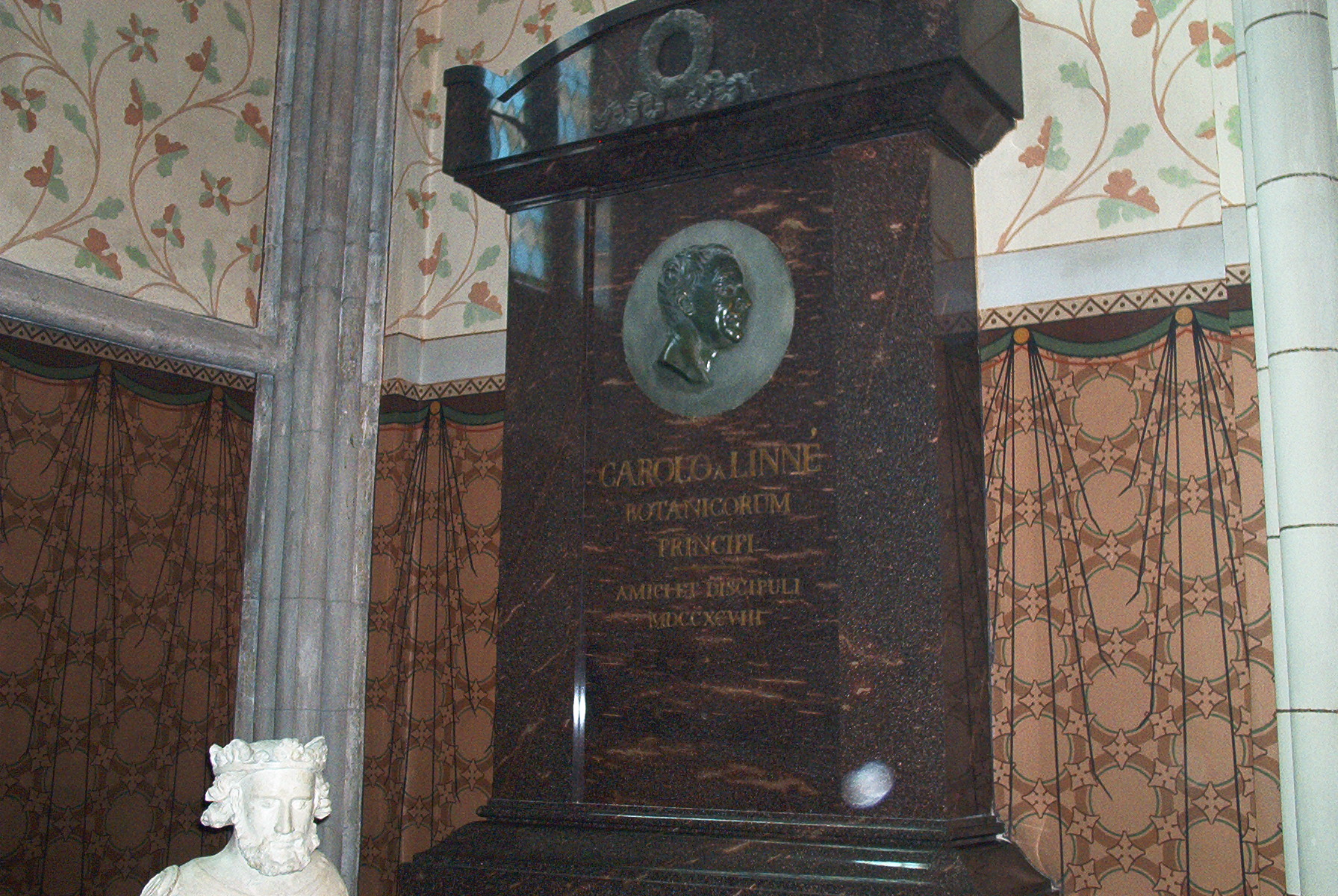
Epitaph in Uppsala Cathedral

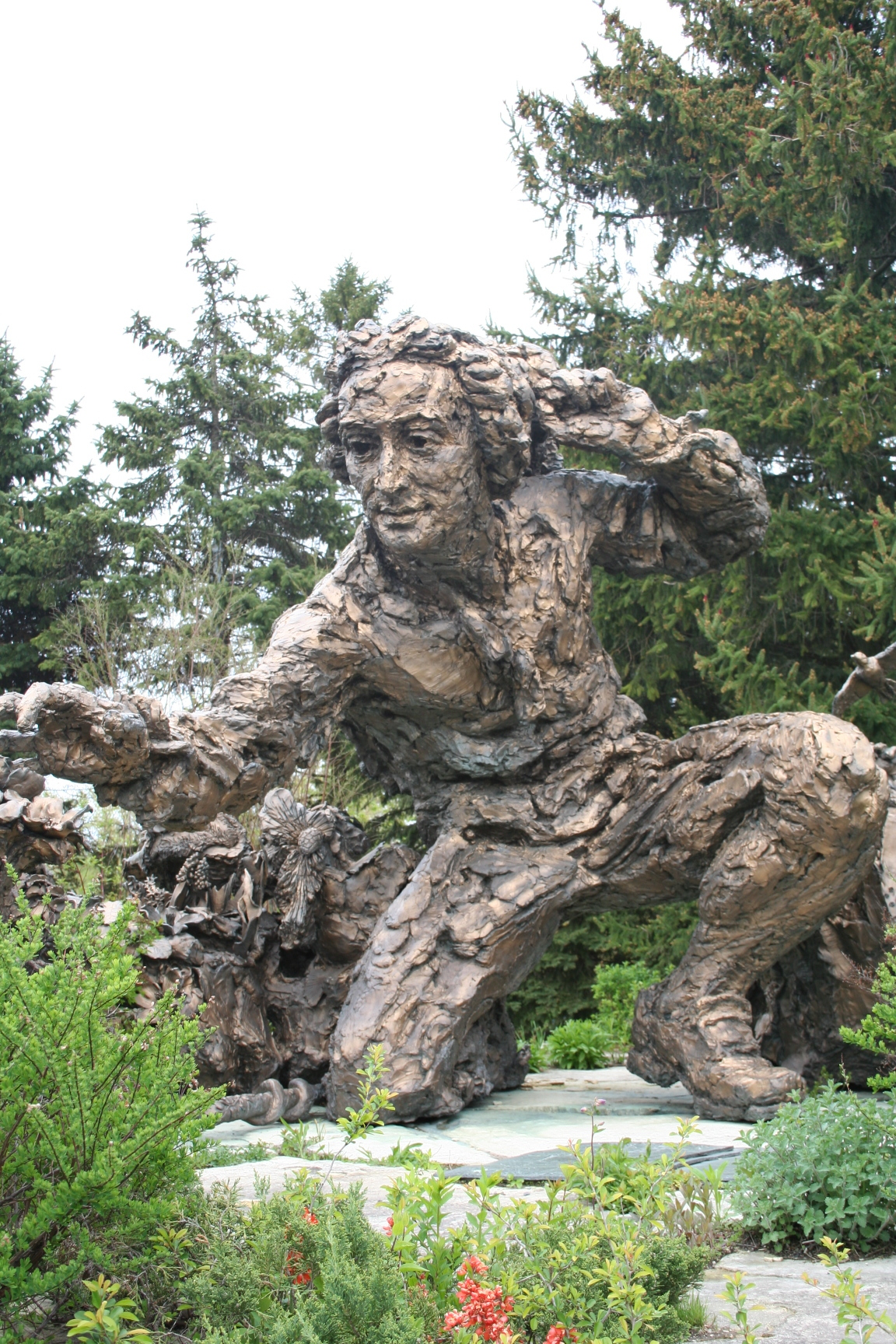
Linnaeus sculpture in the Chicago Botanic Garden

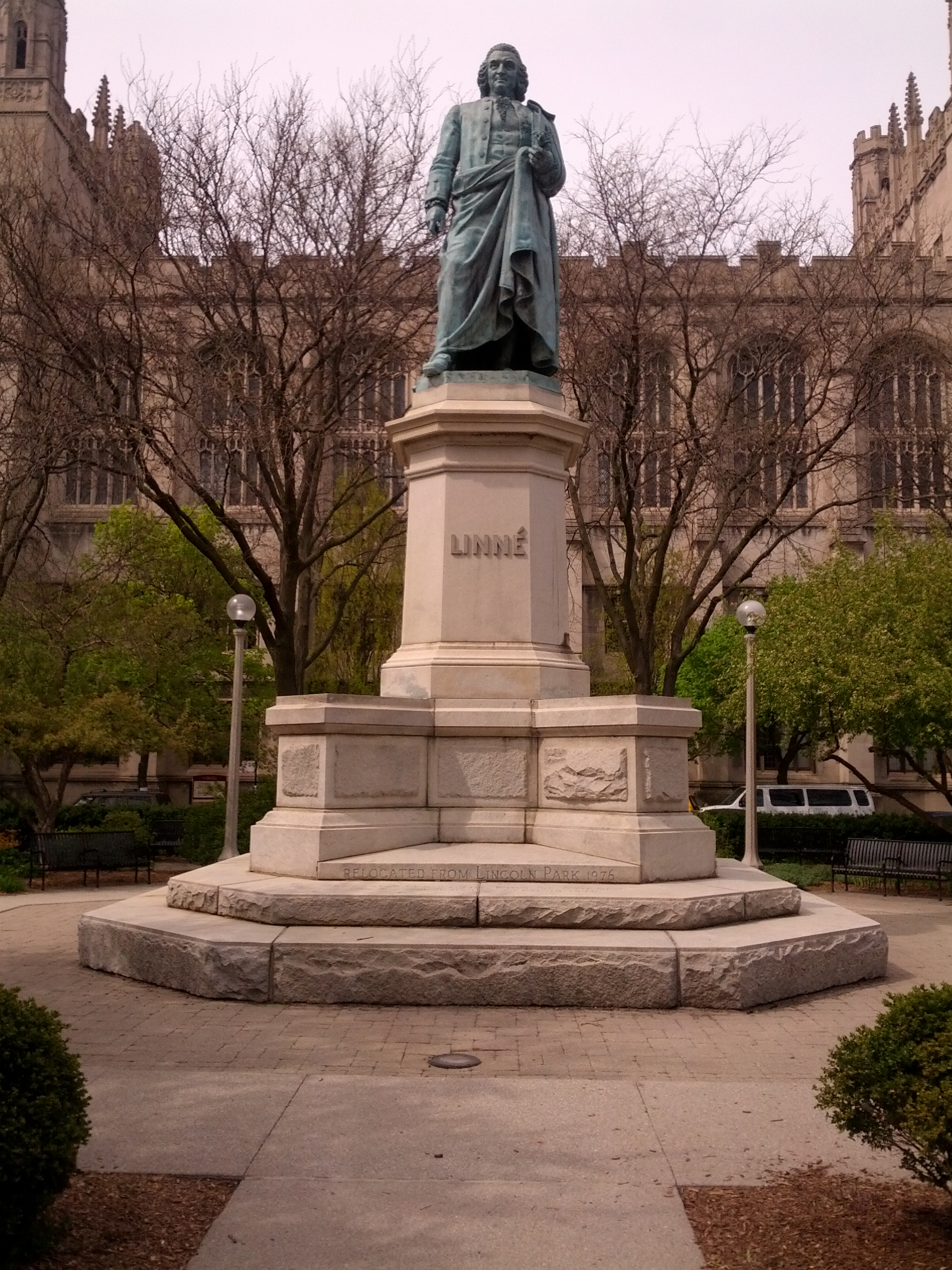
Statue of Linnaeus on the University of Chicago's Midway Plaisance

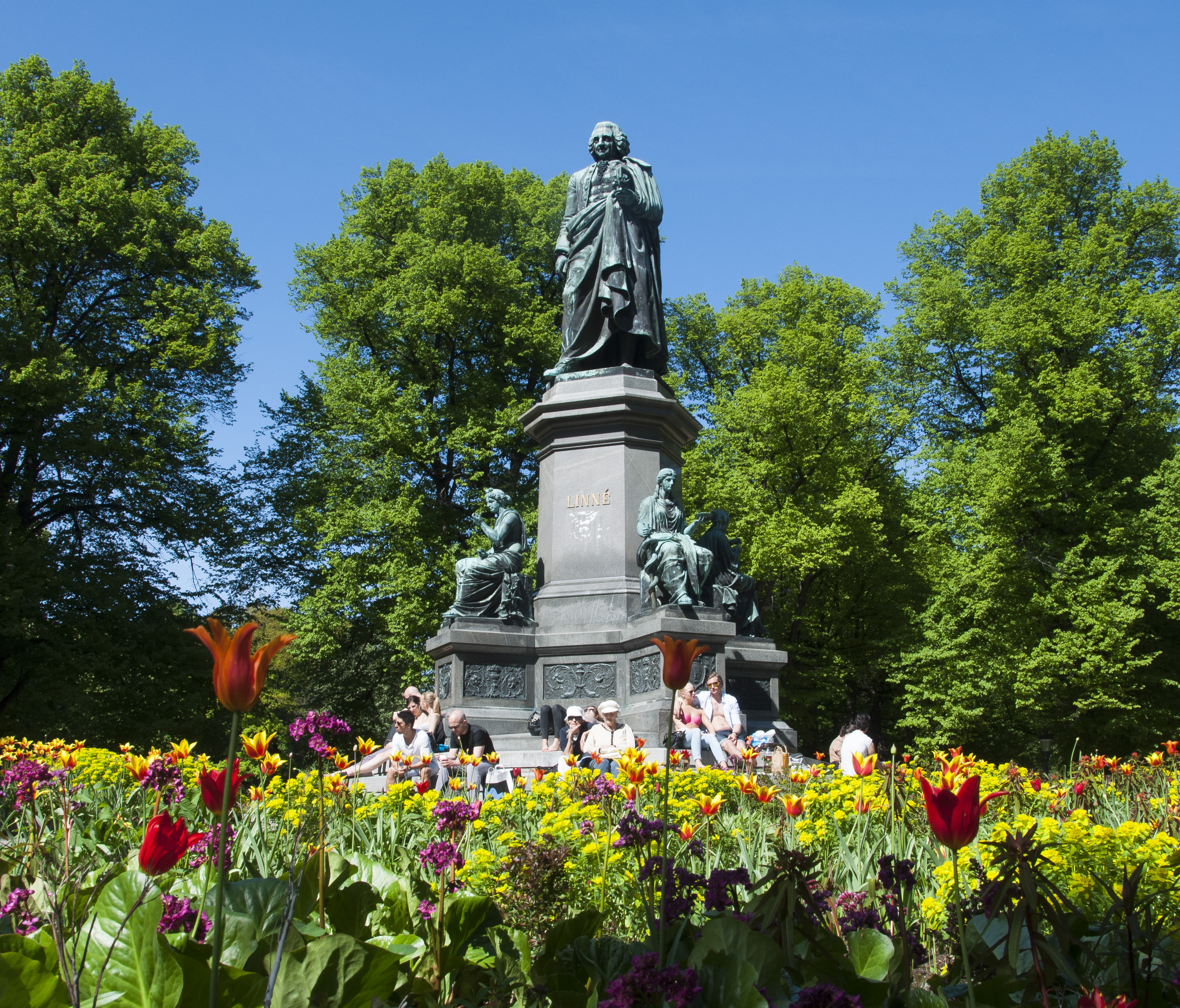
Statue of Linnaeus in Humlegården, Stockholm.

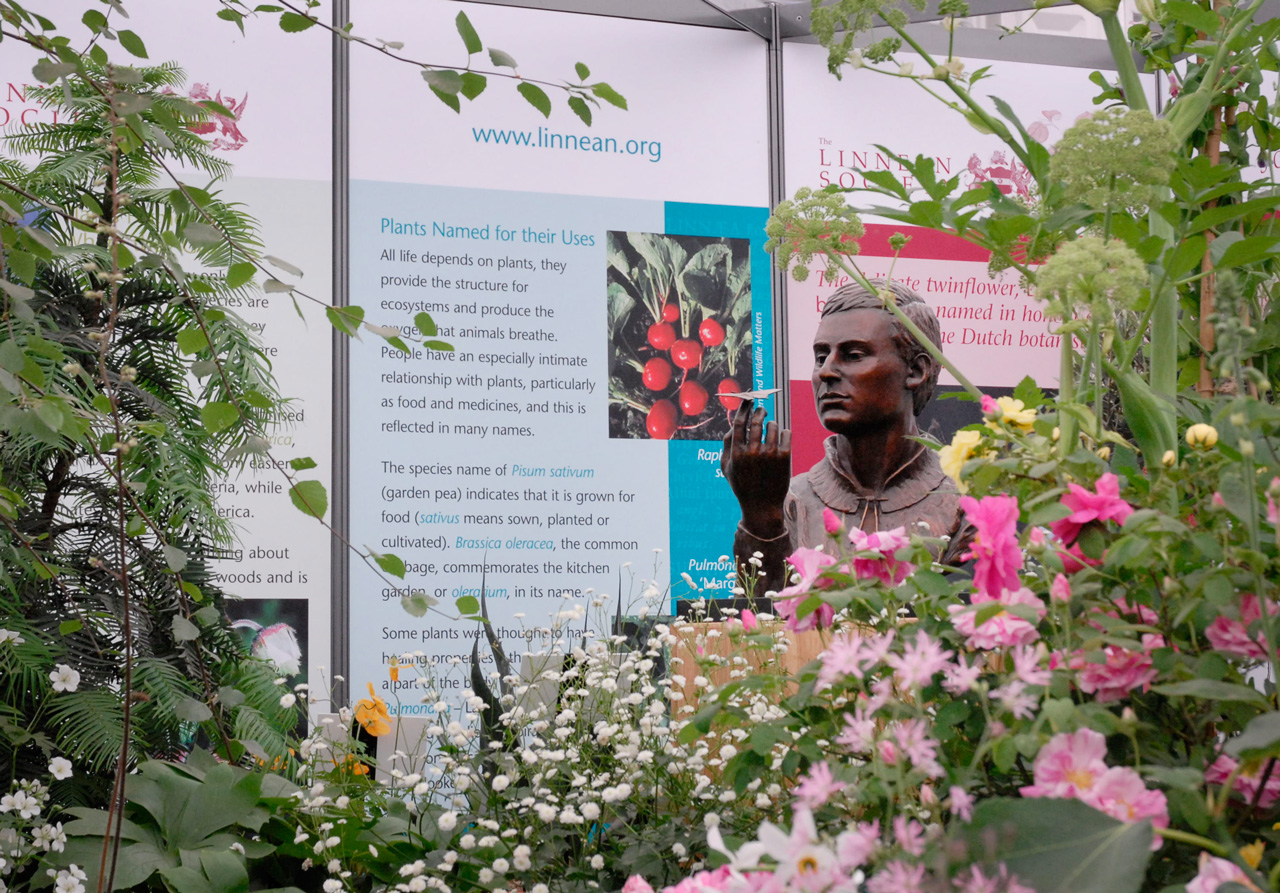
Bust of Linnaeus by British sculptor Anthony Smith, at the Chelsea Flower Show in 2007

== Anniversaries ==
Anniversaries of Linnaeus' 1707 birth, especially in centennial years, have been marked by major celebrations. In 1807, events were held in Sweden that included Linnaeus' daughters and apostles of Linnaeus, such as Adam Afzelius who was then head of the short-lived Linnéska institutet. A century later, celebrations of the bicentennial expanded globally and were even larger in Sweden. At Uppsala University, honorary doctorates were given to Ernst Haeckel, Francis Darwin and Selma Lagerlöf, among others. The memorials were so numerous that newspaper columnists began to tire of them and printed caricatures of the esteemed Linnaeus. In 1917, on the 210th anniversary of Linnaeus' birth, the Swedish Linnaeus Society was founded and proceeded to restore the Linnaean Garden, which had fallen into disrepair. In 2007, tricentennial celebrations were held. During that year a documentary titled Expedition Linné was produced, which was intended to increase public understanding of and respect for nature.

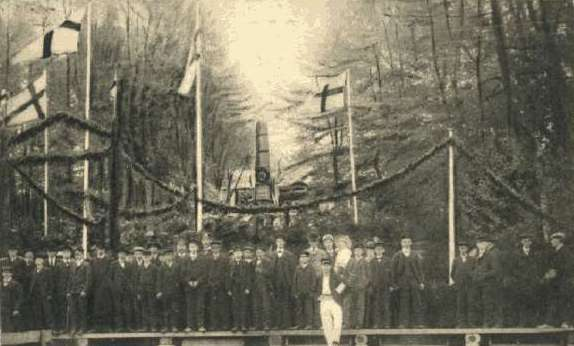
Celebration in Råshult, 1907

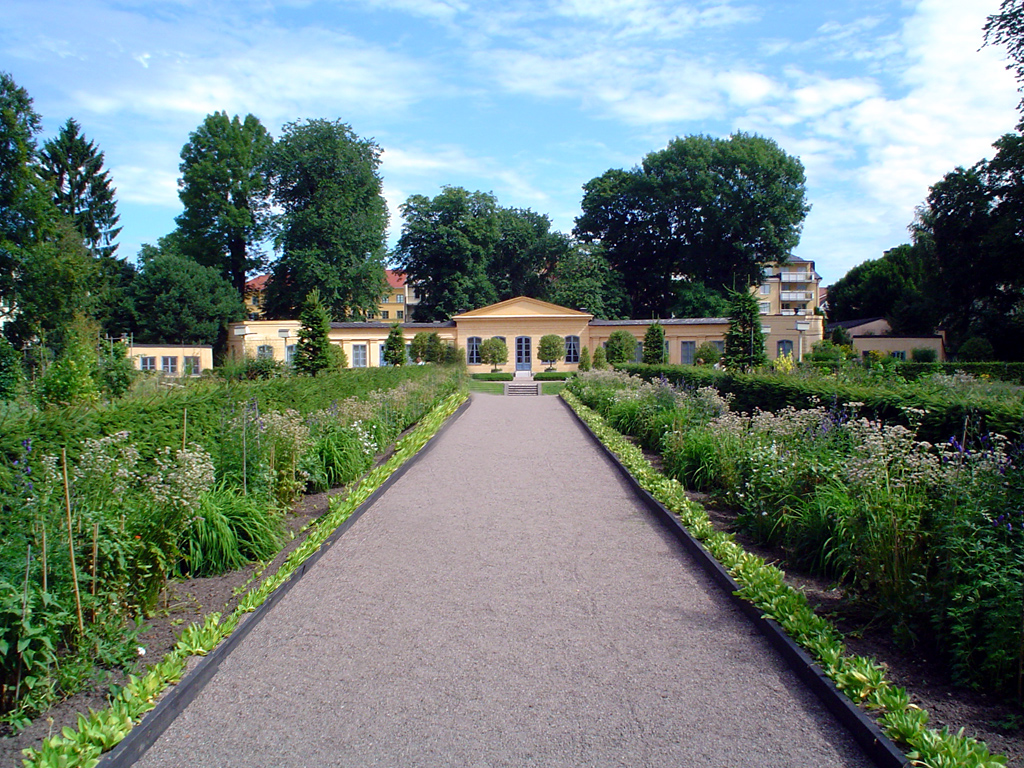
The restored Linnaean garden

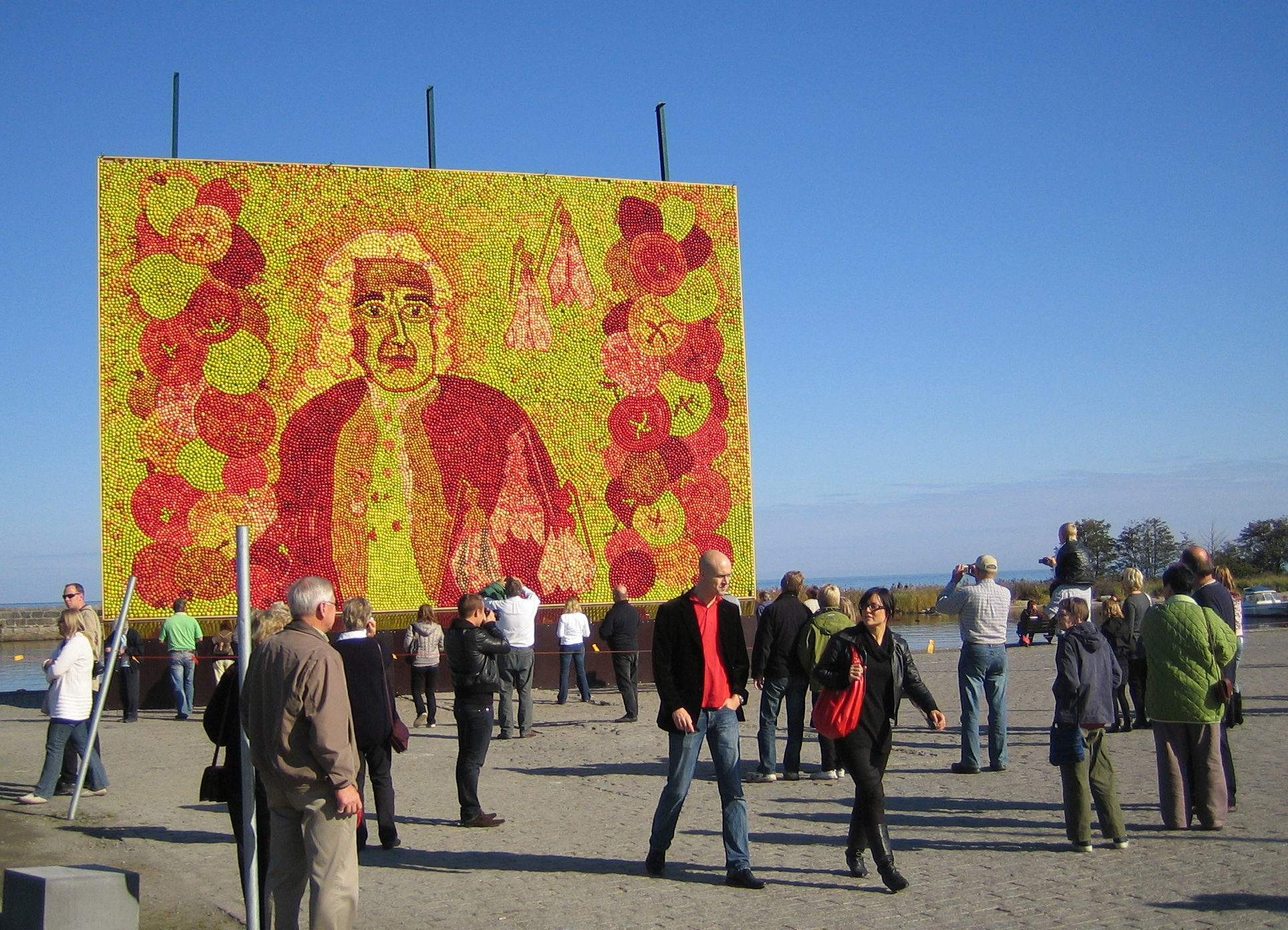
Mosaic portrait of Linnaeus made from apples in Kivik, 2007

== Medals and awards ==
In 1777, Josiah Wedgwood produced a portrait medallion of Linnaeus.

Following the death of Linnaeus, the King of Sweden commissioned a medal to be struck with Linnaeus bearing a twinflower on the front and a dejected Cybele on the back. (Note: A print depicting the medal with Cybele described on P. 492 of Pulteney (1805) is #2 depicted on this page. An example of #1 is pictured on this page Some other medals with pictures online: A bronze medal produced in 1978 for the bicentennial of his death: Item 74 on "MB50modernGBandDutchNL". Archived from the original on 2011-07-17.; high-resolution "Linnaeus". Archived from the original on 2012-03-28.; A silver medal produced circa 1880 in Belgium for the Royal Linnean Agricultural and Horticultural Society: "Belgium. THE ROYAL LINNEAN AGRICULTURAL AND HORTICULTURAL SOCIETY". Archived from the original on 2012-03-17.)

In 1830, the London Pharmaceutical Society produced a Linnaeus medal by William Wyon featuring Panacea on the back.

The Linnean Society of New South Wales awards a bursary to assist botany, zoology or geology students at the University of Sydney.

The Chelonian Research Foundation manages a financial endowment called the Linnaeus Fund, named in his honor for being the first turtle taxonomist. Awards have been granted annually since 1992 for turtle research projects.

In 2007, Uppsala University produced a Linnaeus Medal; in gold "for truly outstanding scientific achievement, especially in the Linnaean subject areas but also for meritorious furtherance of the legacy of Linnaeus or Uppsala University" and silver for "estimable administrative service in connection with the Linnaeus Tercentenary."

=== Linnean Society of London ===
The Linnean Society of London has awarded the Linnean Medal for excellence in botany or zoology since 1888. Starting in 1978, in commemoration of the 200th anniversary of the death of Linnaeus, the Bicentenary Medal of the Linnean Society has been awarded in recognition of work done by a biologist under the age of forty. In 2007, they produced 300 Linnean Tercentenary Medals which feature an illustration by Linnaeus of Andromeda (mythology) next to one of the plant he named Andromeda, from his expedition to Lapland on the front and a spiral design made from illustrations of his sexual system for plant classification taken from Systema Naturae on the back. They were cast in silver, for those "internationally recognised for their contribution to our understanding of the natural world, particularly at the higher, organisational levels" and "outstanding and effective popularisers, particularly of the broad concepts of evolution and the importance of biodiversity" and bronze for "Fellows of the Society in recognition for their assistance and work." The society also marked the tercentenary by commissioning a bronze portrait bust of Linnaeus by the sculptor Anthony Smith.

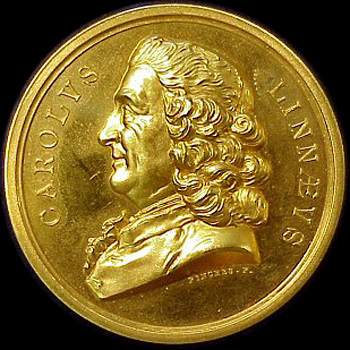
The Gold Medal of the Linnean Society

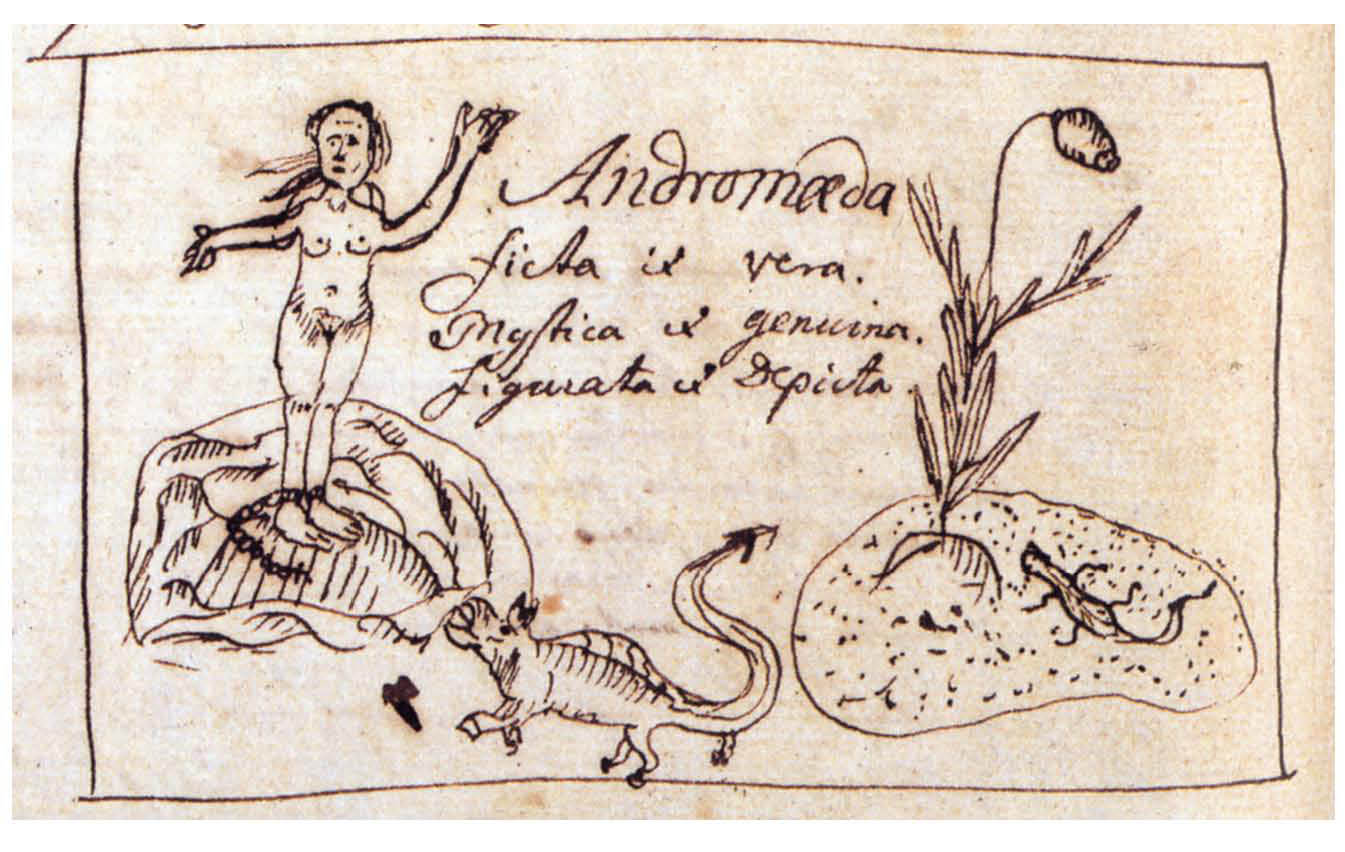
Linnaeus' original Andromeda drawing

== Money and stamps ==
Linnaeus has appeared on numerous Swedish postage stamps (Note: Swedish postage stamps issued for the 2007 tricentennial anniversary of Linnaeus' birth. See also "Archived copy" (PDF). Archived from the original (PDF) on 2011-09-27. "Archived copy" (PDF). Archived from the original (PDF) on 2011-09-27.) and banknotes.

In 1986, a new 100 kronor bill was introduced featuring a portrait of Linnaeus, drawings of pollinating plants from his Praeludia Sponsaliorum Plantarum, a sketch of the Linnaean Garden and a quote, often described as Linnaeus' motto, from Philosophia Botanica which reads "OMNIA MIRARI ETIAM TRITISSIMA": Find wonder in all things, even the most commonplace. (Note: Scientists and Mathematicians on Money: Linnaeus is featured on the 100 Swedish Krona banknote (front and back): Linnaeus also appeared on the back of this 50 kronor note from 1989.)

For the tricentennial anniversary of Linnaeus' birth in 2007, the Sveriges Riksbank issued two commemorative coins: a 2000 krona gold coin featuring Linnaeus' eye "studying nature through a magnifying glass" on the front and a butterfly on the back with the Latin phrase NATURAE MORES DISCERE ("to learn the ways of nature") and a 200 krona silver coin featuring a portrait of Linnaeus surrounded by twinflower plants on the front and a picture of stamens and pistils on the back with the words SYSTEMA NATURAE, Linnaeus' book from which the picture was copied.

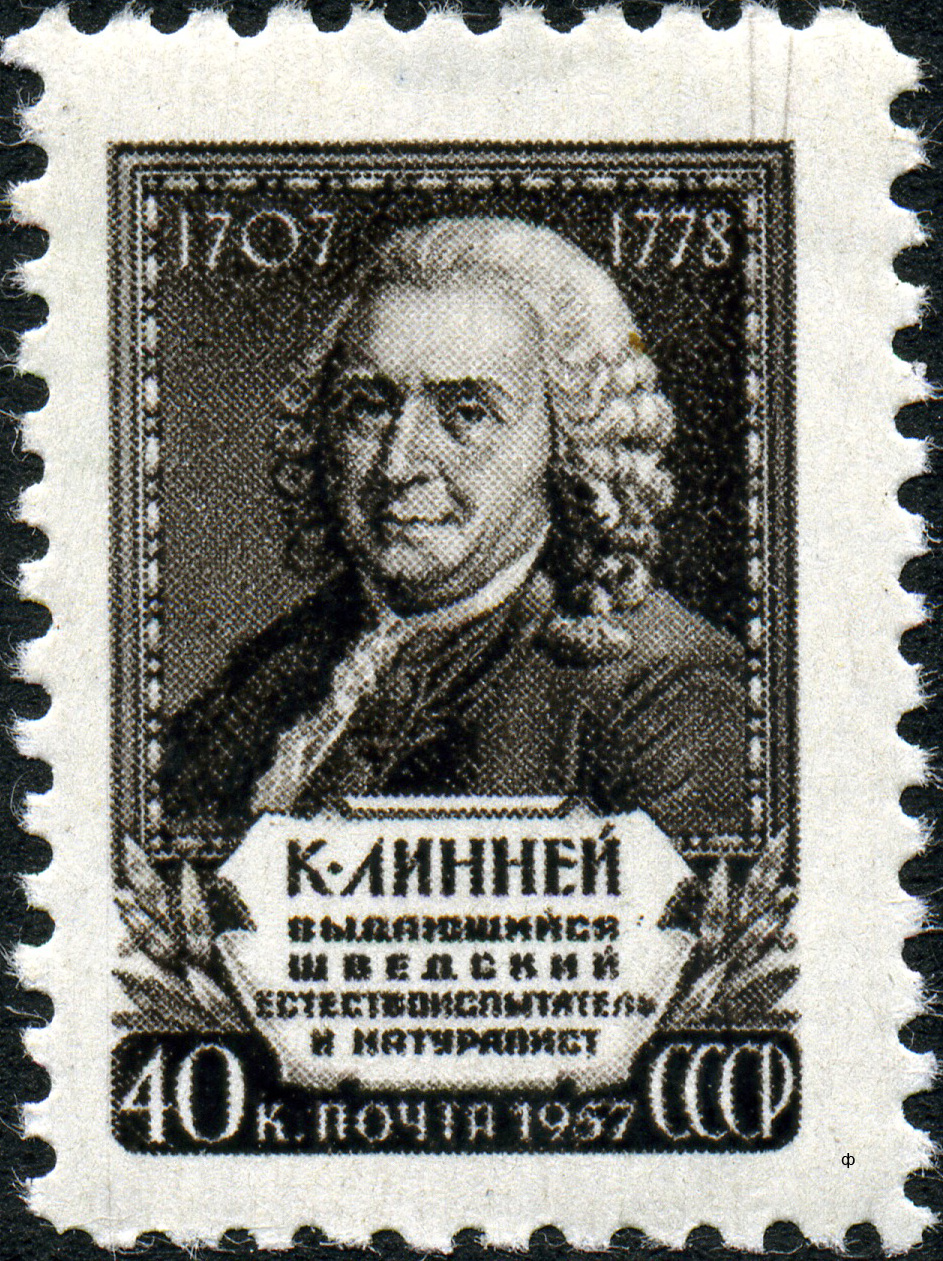
Linnaeus on a 1957 postage stamp from the Soviet Union

== Baby names ==
People have been named in Linnaeus' honor.

=== Linnaeus or Linné ===
The name Linnaeus or Linné has been given as a first or middle name, usually for boys, to several notable people including:

- Linné Ahlstrand, an American model and actress
- George Linnaeus Banks, a British journalist, and playwright
- Charles Linnaeus Benedict, a U.S. federal judge
- Otto Linné Erdmann, a German chemist
- Tore Linné Eriksen, a Norwegian historian
- Linnaeus N. Hines, a former president of Indiana State University
- William Charles Linnaeus Martin, an English naturalist
- Linnaeus Tripe, a British photographer

=== Linnea or Linnéa ===
The given name Linnea or Linnéa is highly popular for girls born in Sweden and Norway. Some notable women with the name:

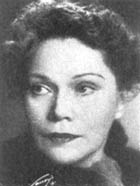
Linnéa Hillberg, a Swedish actress

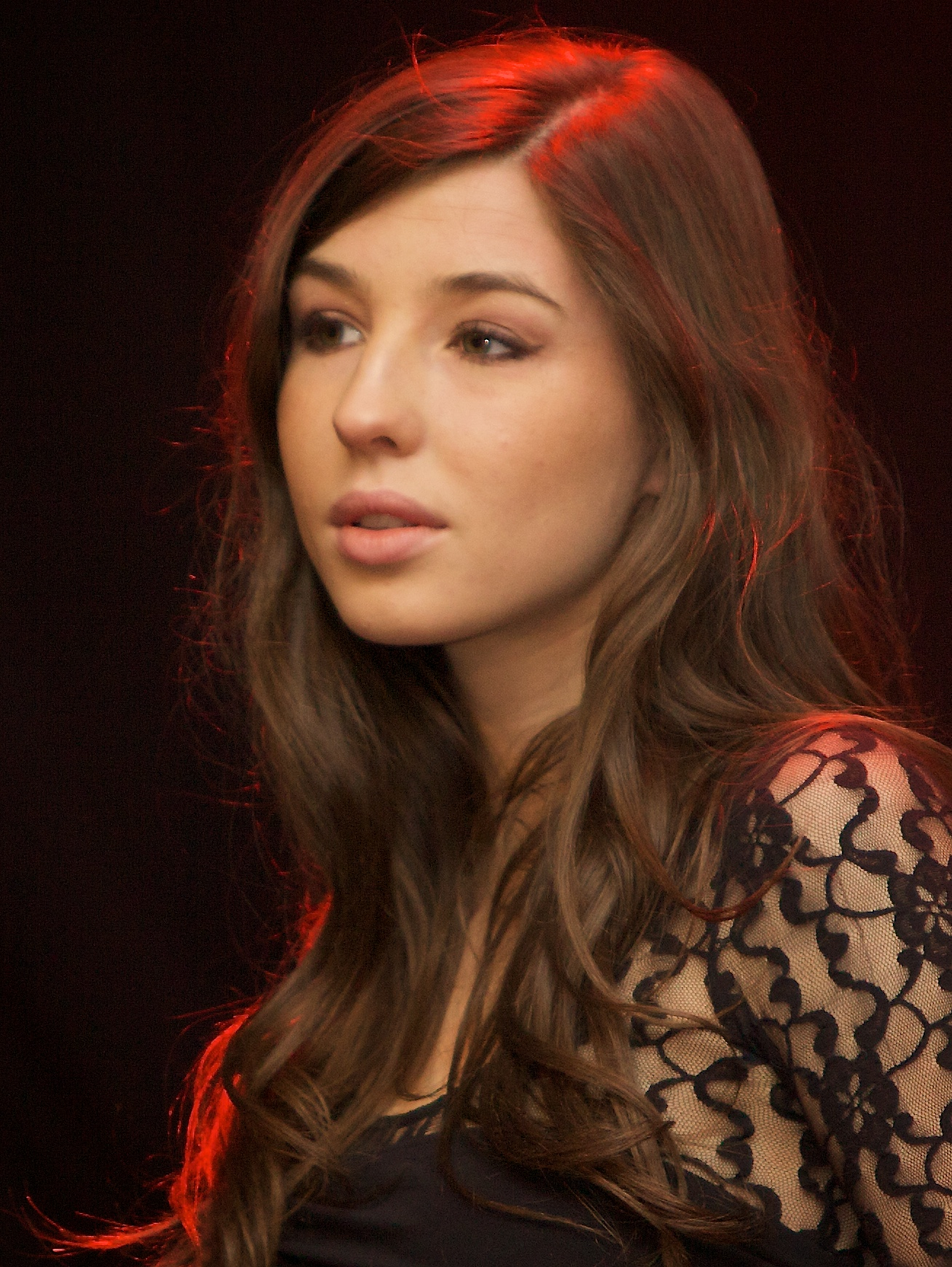
Linnea Dale, a Norwegian singer

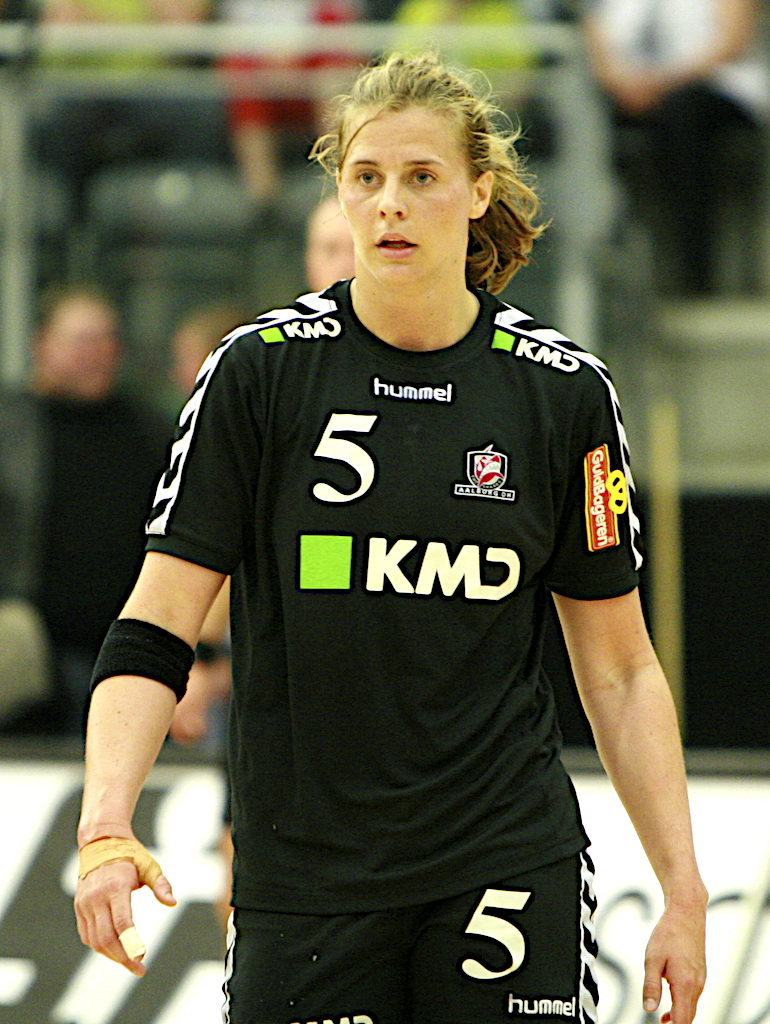
Linnea Torstenson, a Swedish Olympic athlete

== Place names ==
Linneus, Maine, and Linneus, Missouri were named in his honor.

Kingston upon Hull has a street, originally known as Botanic Lane, which was renamed to Linnaeus Street by 1823.

There is a Linnaean Street in Cambridge, Massachusetts, given that name in honor of the botanist in 1850 because Harvard University's Botanic Garden was located there.

In 1878, Rue Névraumont/Névraumontstraat in Saint-Josse-ten-Noode, Brussels, was renamed Rue Linné/Linnéstraat, a reference to its close location to the Botanical Garden.

The Australian National University campus in Canberra has a road named Linnaeus Way, which runs past several biology buildings.

Gustavus Adolphus College began its eponymous Linnaeus Arboretum in 1973. The arboretum has a bust of Linnaeus created by Paul Granlund that "takes the shape of a linden tree, and the back of the head includes impressions of Linnaeus's beloved garden in Uppsala, Sweden." In October 2021, the Gustavus Adolphus College Board of Trustees made the decision to remove the name "Linnaeus" from its campus arboretum, citing scrutiny of Linnaeus' writings on human taxonomy as an example of scientific racism.

Woodward Park in Tulsa, Oklahoma has a section called the Linnaeus Teaching Gardens which features a large bronze statue of Linnaeus.

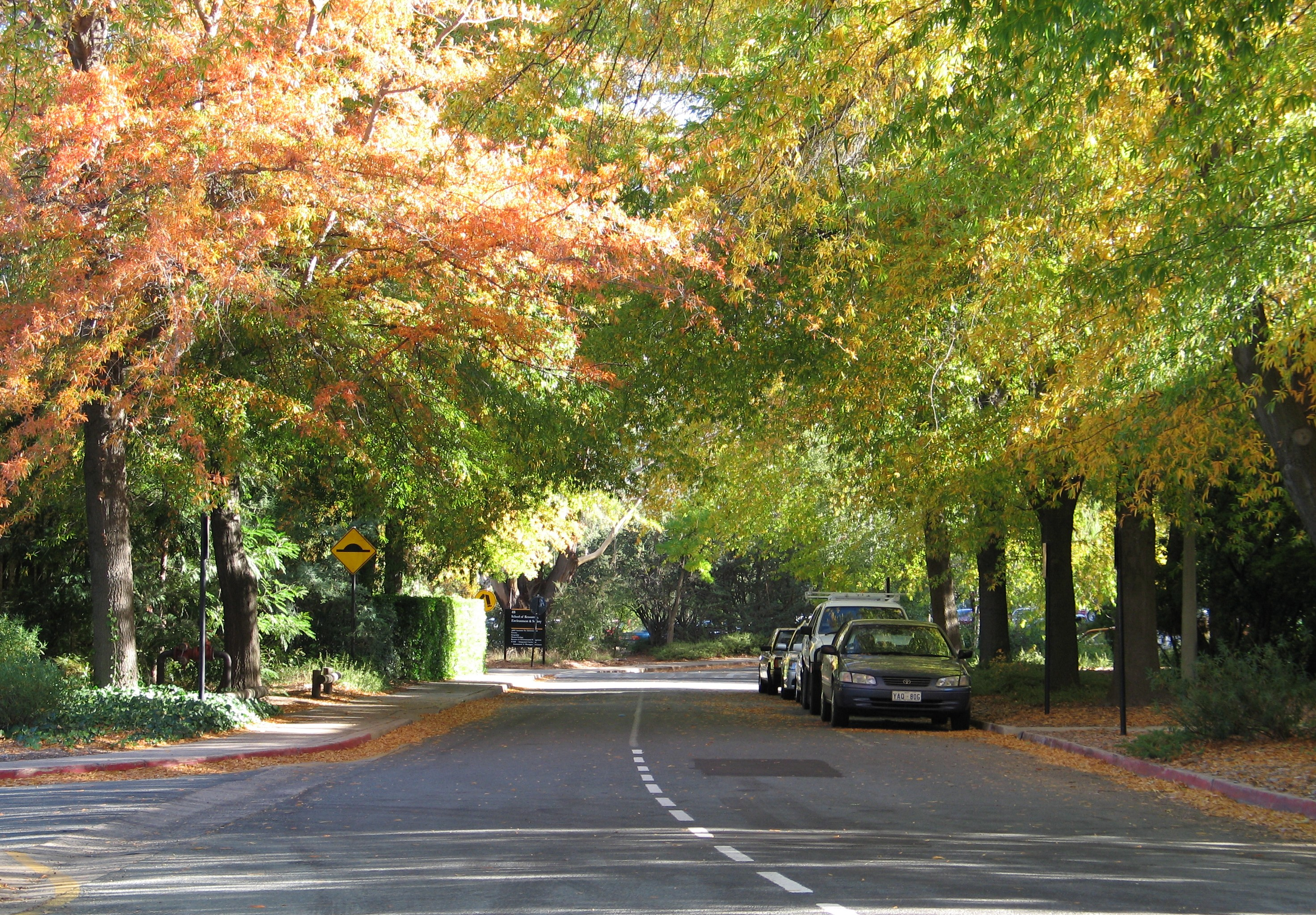
Linnaeus Way at Australian National University

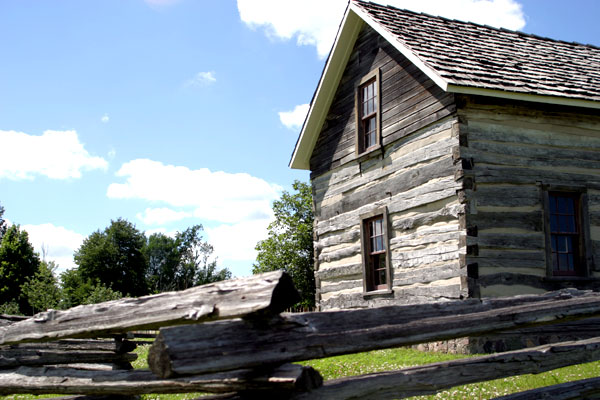
Borgeson family cabin from 1866 in the Linnaeus Arboretum

== Linnaeus University ==
Following approval by the Parliament of Sweden, Växjö University and Kalmar College merged on 1 January 2010; the resulting institution was named Linnaeus University (in Swedish: Linnéuniversitetet) in his honor. The new university's logo carries much symbolism and is based on a drawing by Linnaeus:

The inspiration for the design has been Linnaeus' own books, such as Systema Naturae and the Linnaean Herbarium. The latter publication originates from Linnaeus's studies in Småland, preserved today at Växjö Town Library. The symbol is made up of a stylized tree. The original is a drawing by Linnaeus from his book of herbs and plants. The symbol conveys both the connection to the name and the roots in soil of the Småland region of southern Sweden. At the same time, the tree may be seen as a symbol for the month of May and for growth and vitality, a symbol which agrees well with the University's ambition to be a global university with the region as its base and the world as its stage. The logotype consists of the name [Linnéuniversitetet] written in bold typeface. The idea is that the four fruits from the symbolic tree fall to the ground and enrich the the [sic] name in turn. The fruits form the dots and accent over the letters i and e in [...] Linné.

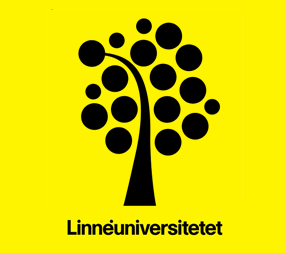
Linnaeus University logo

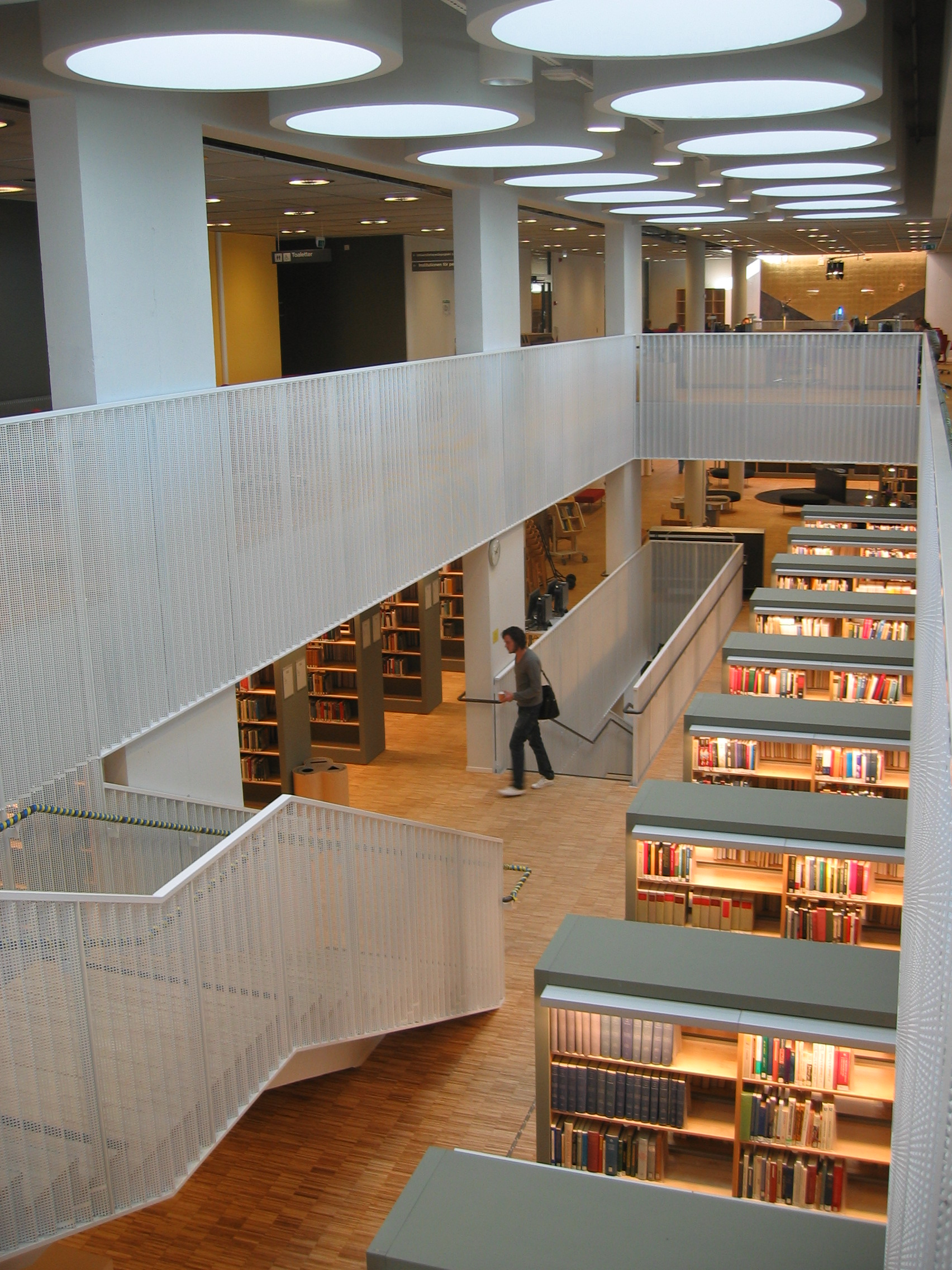
Library interior at Växjö

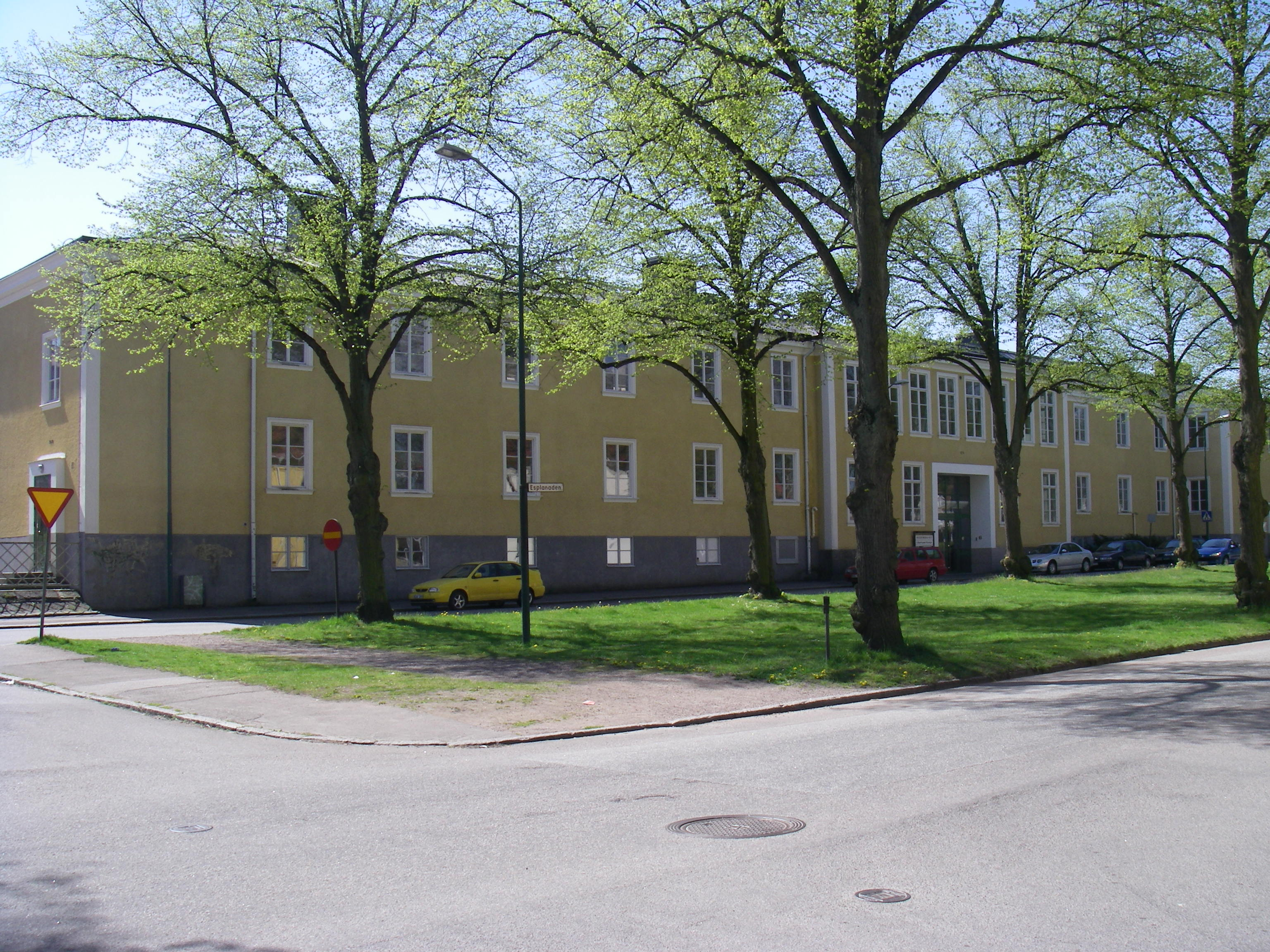
Läkarhuset Kronan, Kalmar

== Museums ==
In the city of Uppsala in which Linnaeus worked and lived for most of his life there are several museums dedicated to him. These include:

- Linnaean Garden - Uppsala University's first botanical garden, planted by Olaus Rudbeck in 1655, and later restored and expanded by Carl Linnaeus; today serving as an outdoor museum, and also as an indoor biographical and science museum dedicated to Linnaeus's personal and professional life, known as the Linnaeus Museum (Linnémuséet), located in the house in the garden that was residence of Linnaeus.
- Linnaeus' Hammarby - Located some 10 km south-east of Uppsala. Served as the summer residence of the Linnaeus family. Is today a historic house museum.
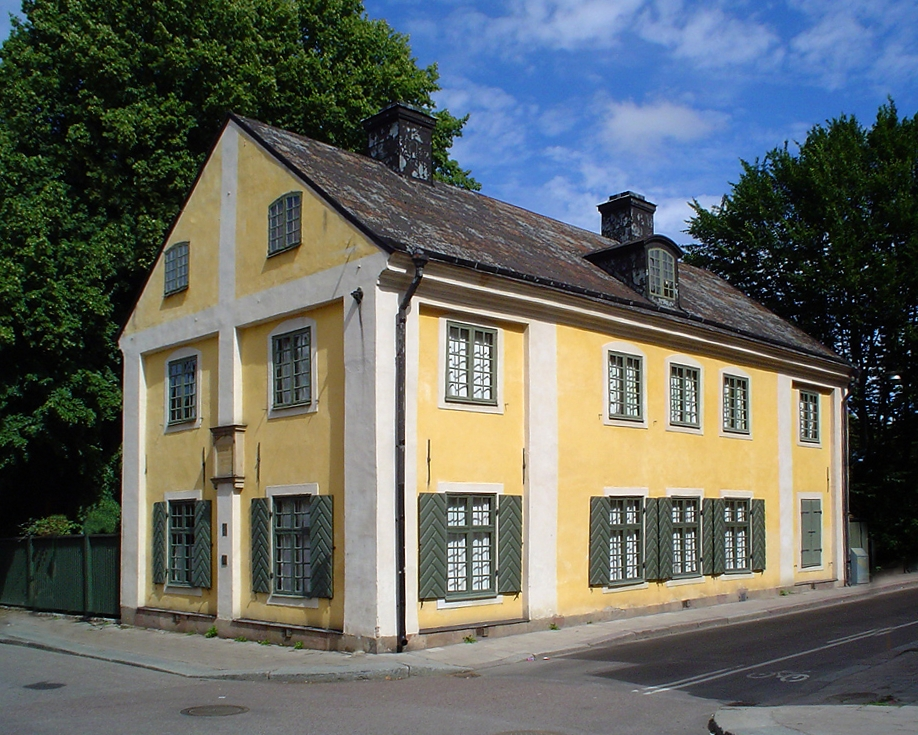
The Linnaeus Museum

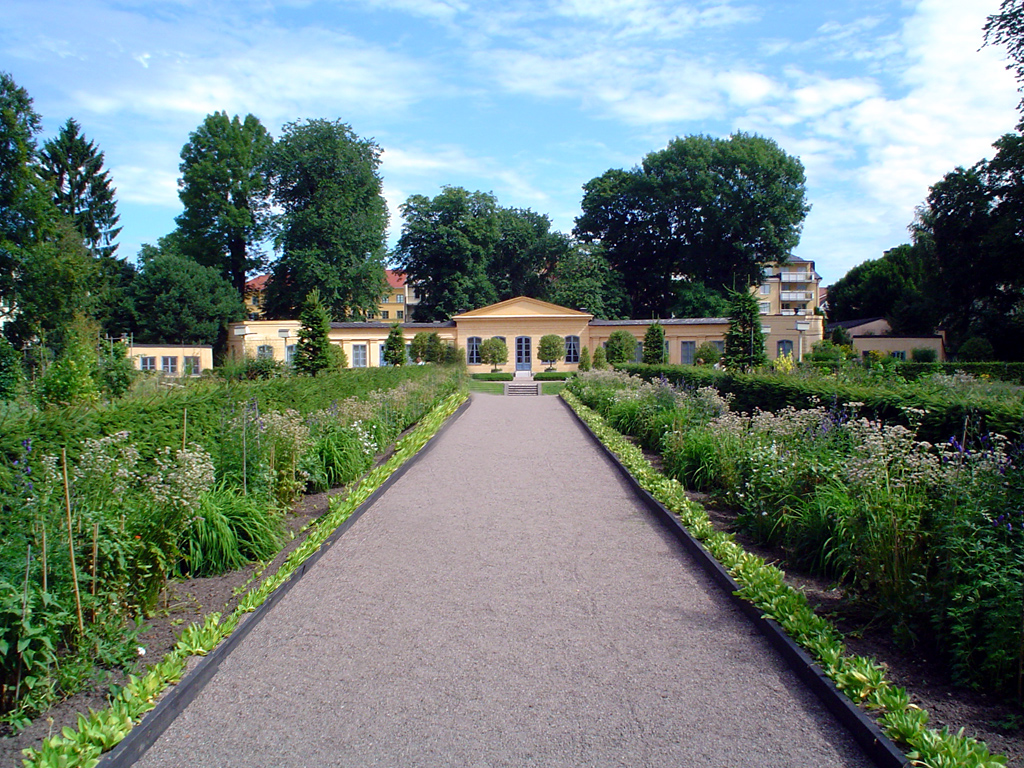
Linnaean Garden

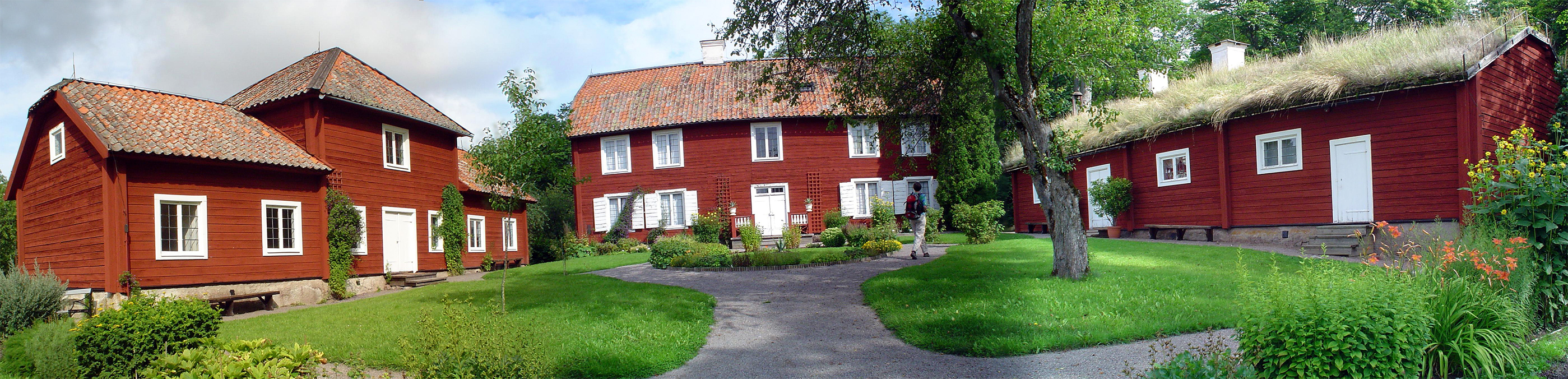
Linnaeus' Hammarby

== Other eponyms ==
A species of snake, Calamaria linnaei, is named in honor of Linnaeus. Asteroid 7412 Linnaeus was named in his honor. In 2008, Linnaeosicyos, a monotypic genus of flowering plants from the Dominican Republic, belonging to the family Cucurbitaceae, was named him. Other examples are:

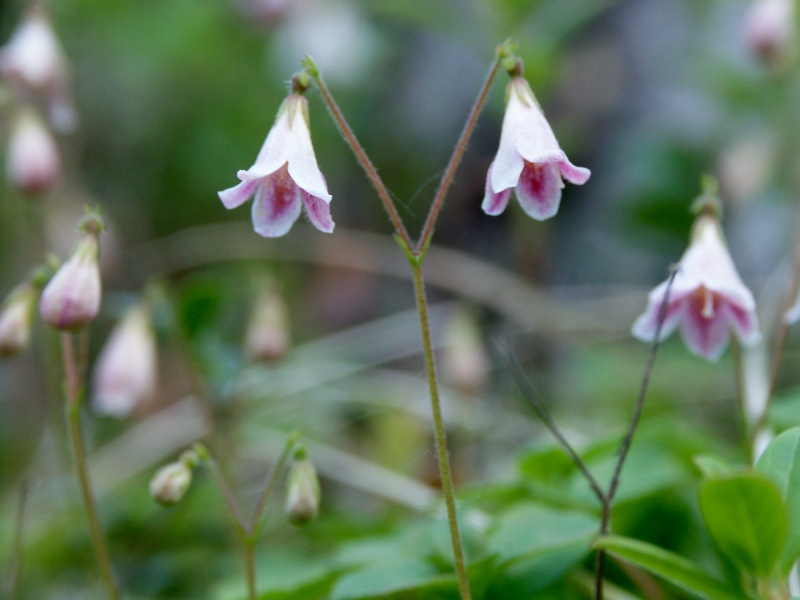
The twinflower genus Linnaea

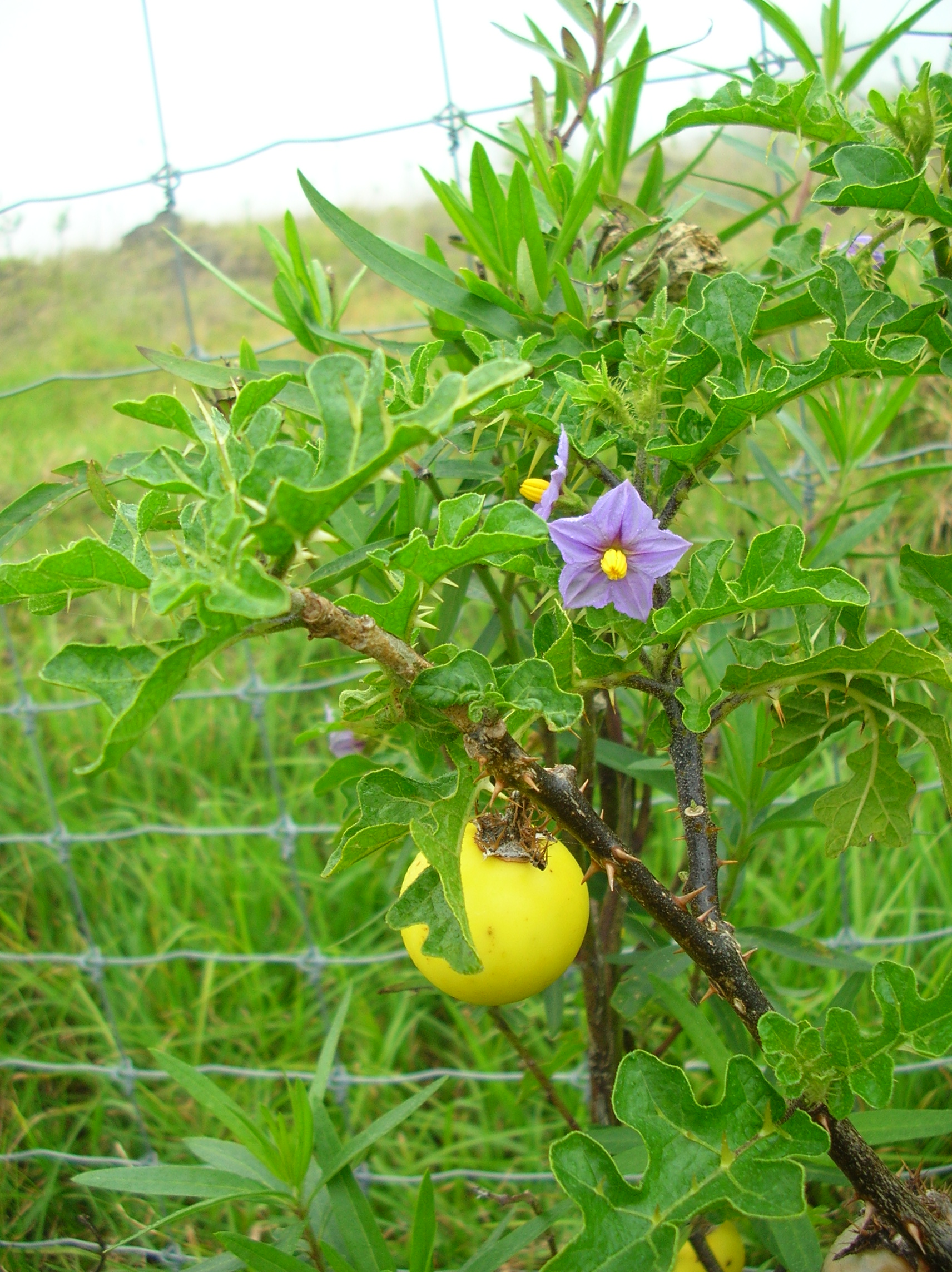
The nightshade species Solanum linnaeanum

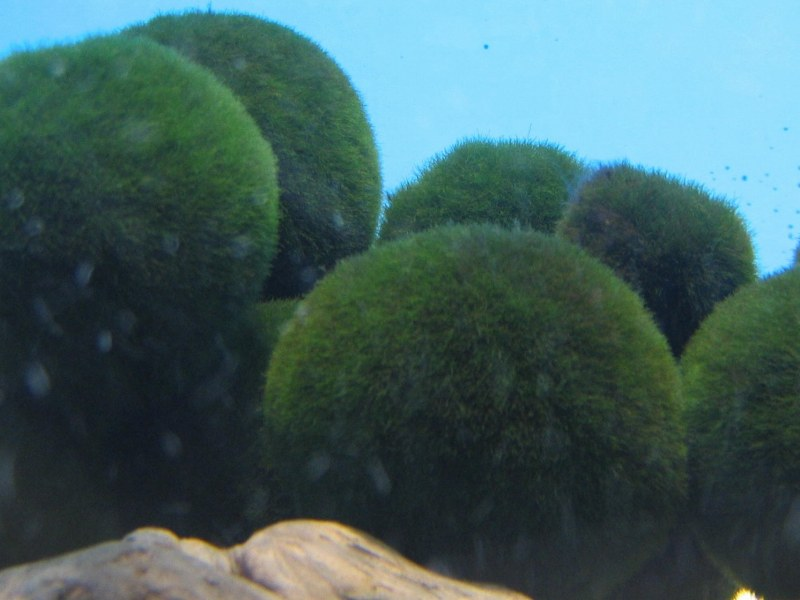
The marimo-forming green algae species Aegagropila linnaei

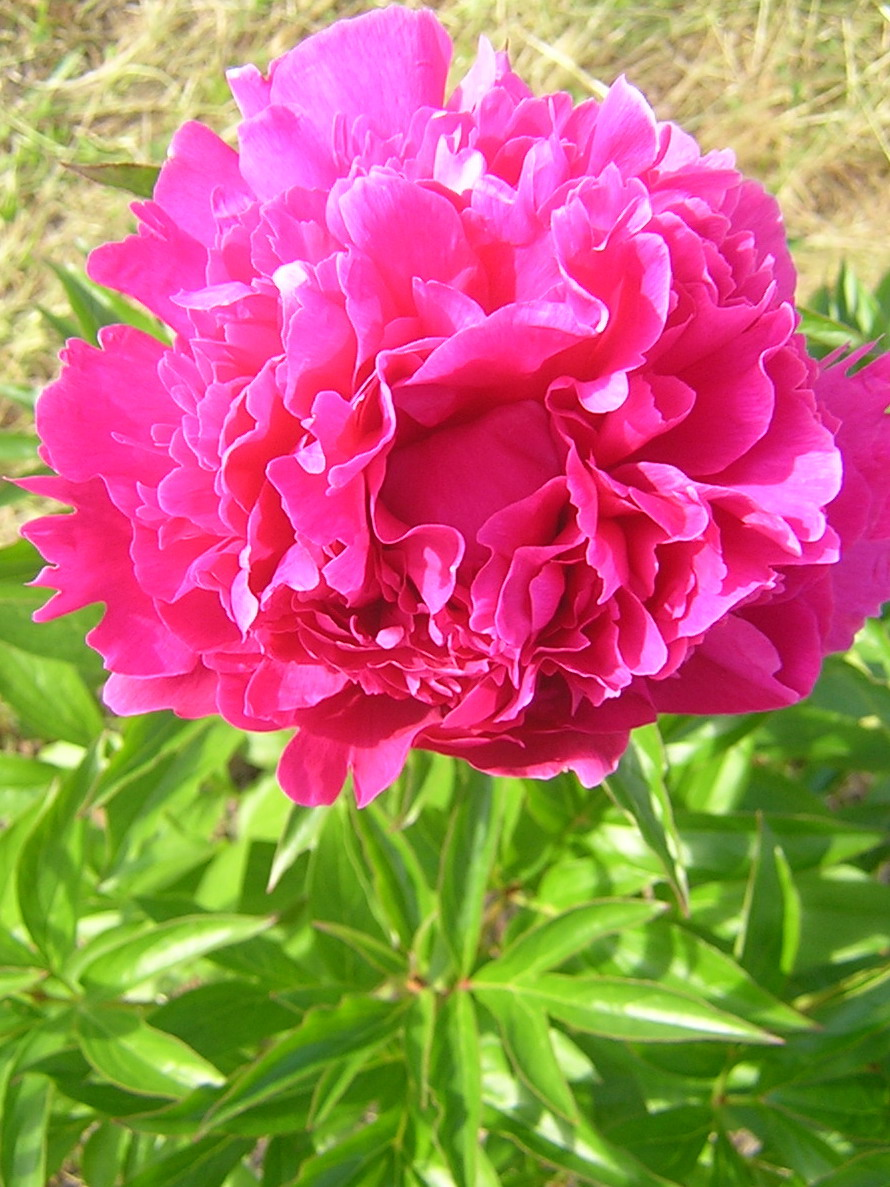
The double-flowered peony cultivar 'Linné'

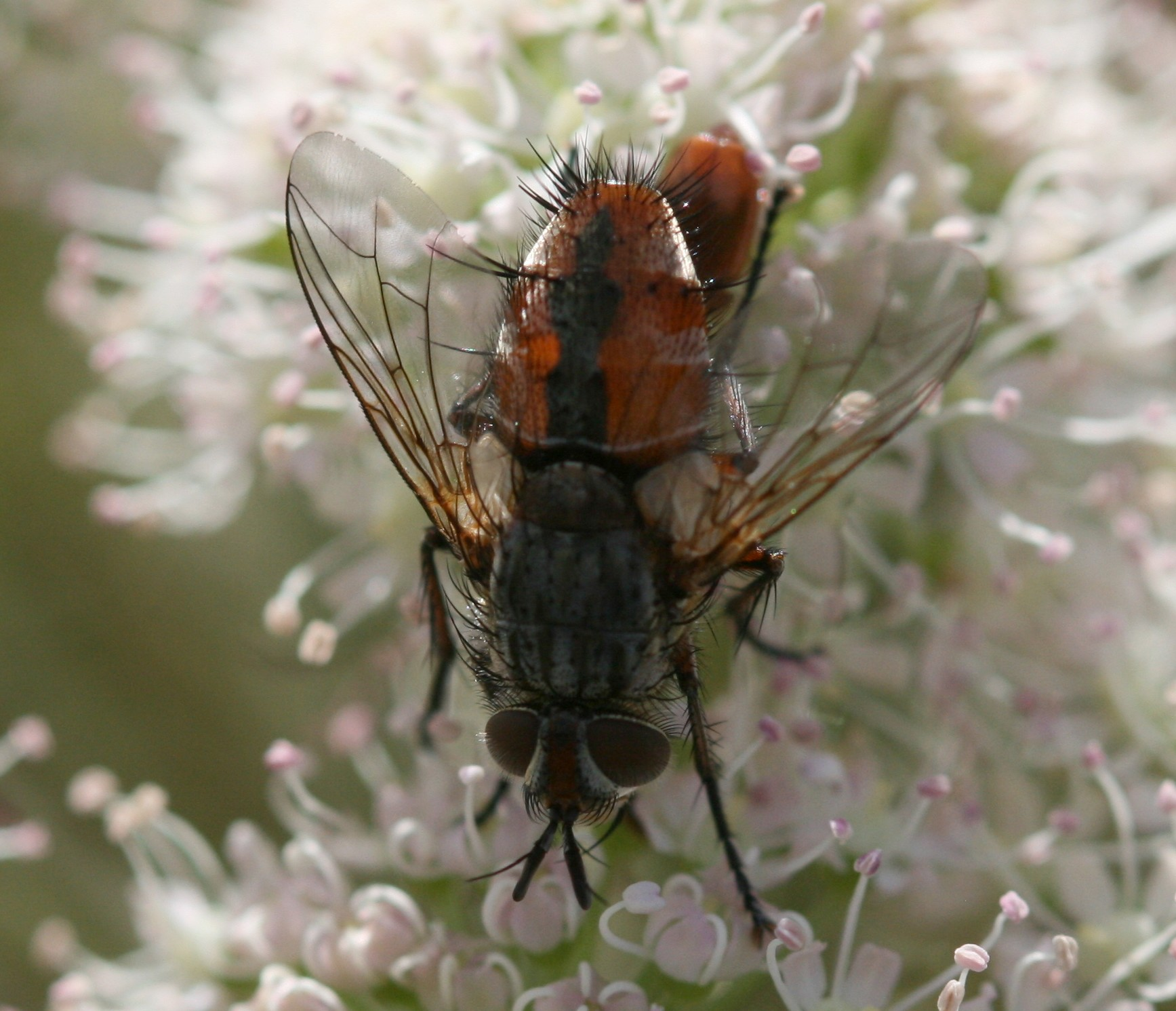
The tachina fly genus Linnaemya

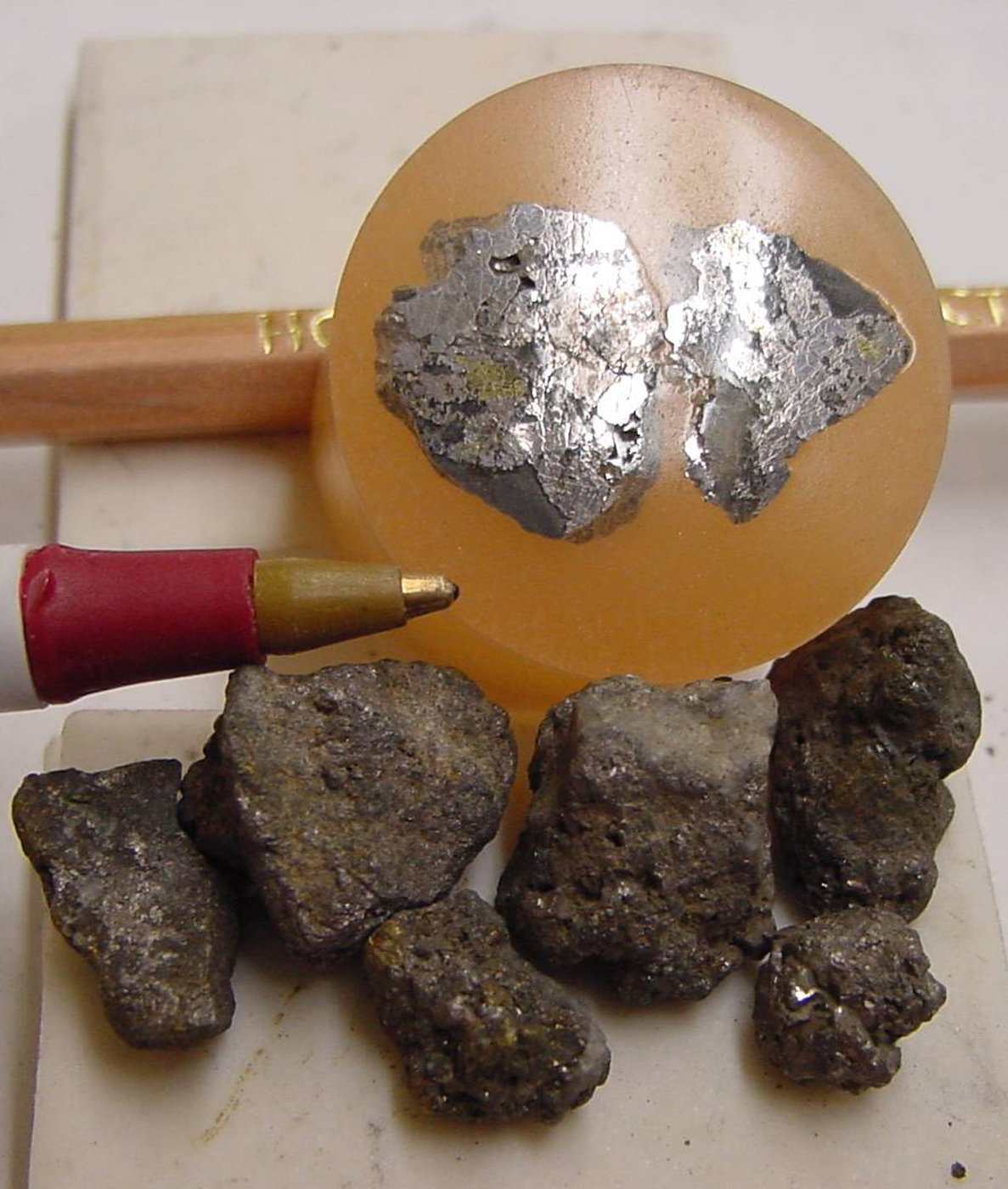
The cobalt sulfide mineral Linnaeite

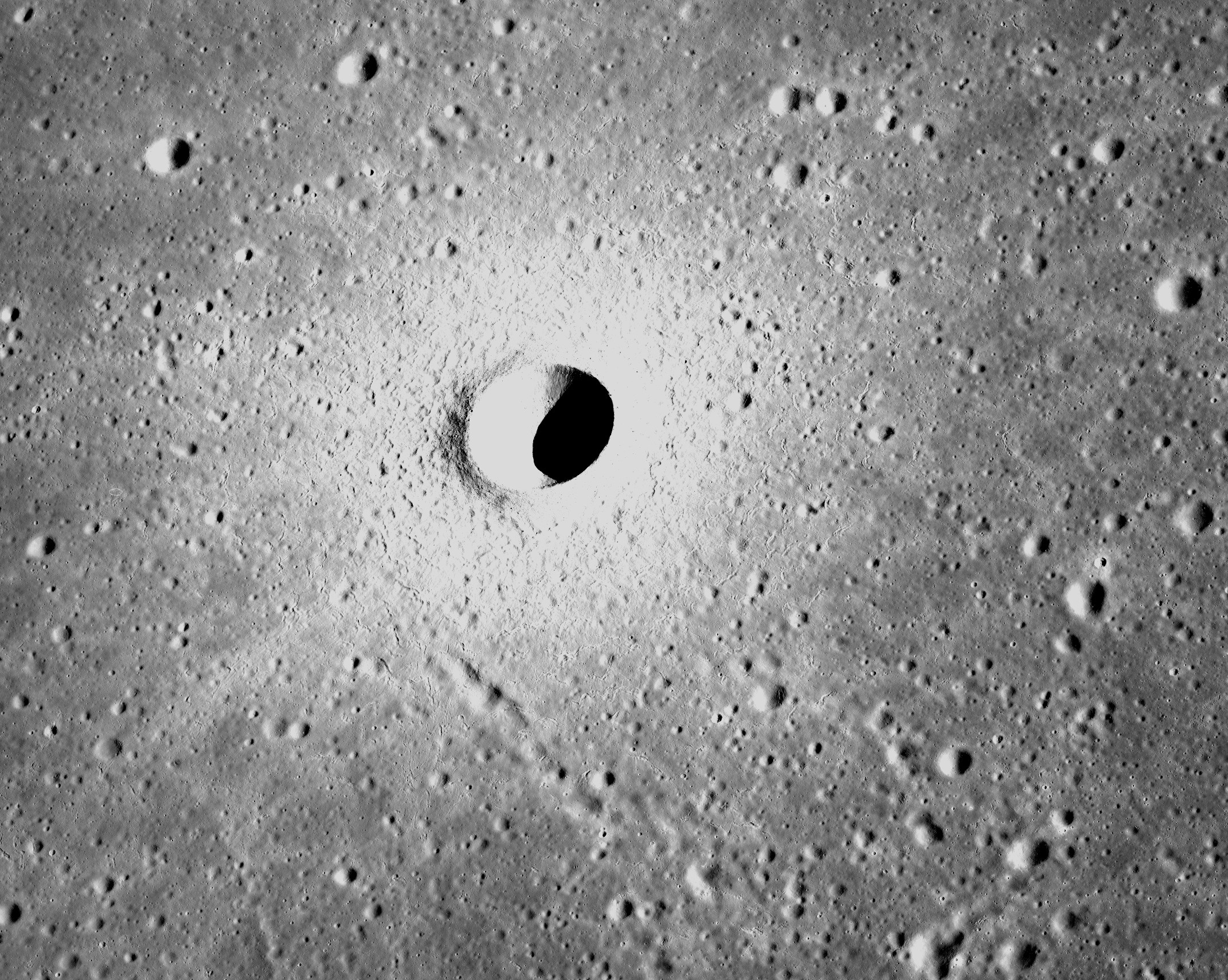
The lunar crater Linné
