= Linnea Regnander =

Swedish runway model (born 1993)

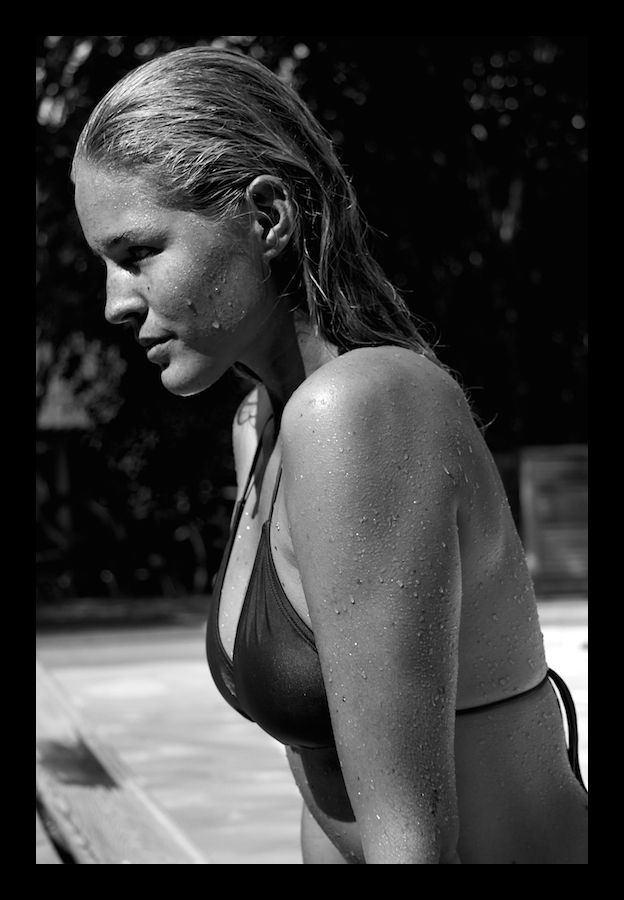
Linnea Regnander

Adina Linnea Birgitta Regnander (born 1 April 1993) is a Swedish runway model.

Regnander studied at Kunskapsgymnasiet in her native Västerås, where she lives; she has also spent periods living in Melbourne, Australia with her family.

She started working as a model with Stockholmsgruppen at the age of sixteen. She got her breakthrough in July 2010 when she did runway work for designer Valentino in Paris. Since then she has done runway work for designers like Calvin Klein, Gucci, Alexis Mabille, Miu Miu, Alexander Wang, Salvatore Ferragamo and Elie Saab.

Regnander has also done commercial jobs for the brands Uggs, H&M, Other Stories, Max Mara, Boomerang and GAP.
