= Linnea Hall =

Historic building in Portland, Oregon, U.S.

- U.S. National Register of Historic Places
- U.S. Historic district – Contributing property
- Portland Historic Landmark
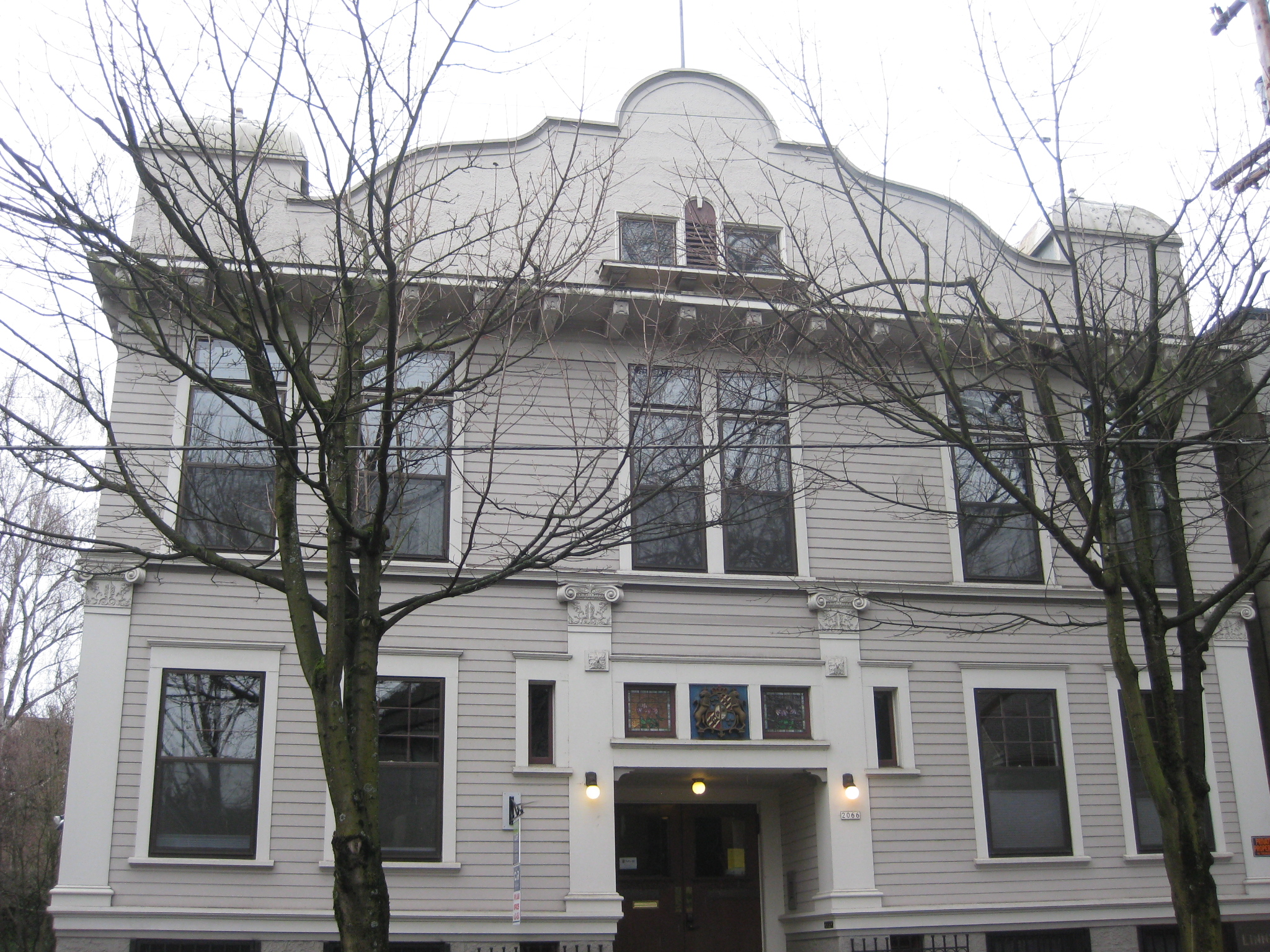
- The building's front exterior in 2010

- Location within Portland, Oregon Location within Oregon Location within the United States
- Location: 2066 NW Irving Street; Portland, Oregon
- Coordinates: 45°31′39″N 122°41′38″W
- Built: 1909
- Architect: E.J. Grahs
- Architectural style: Scandinavian Baroque Revival
- Part of: Alphabet Historic District (ID00001293)
- NRHP reference No.: 81000517
- Added to NRHP: December 2, 1981

Linnea Hall is a building located in northwest Portland, Oregon, United States. It is listed on the National Register of Historic Places.

== See also ==
- National Register of Historic Places listings in Northwest Portland, Oregon
