= Linnea Wester =

Swedish handball player (born 1995)

Personal information
- Full name: Linnea Wester
- Nationality: Swedish
- Born: 28 July 1995 (age 31) Kiruna, Sweden
- Height: 1.81 m (5 ft 11 in)

Sport
- Sport: Handball
- Position: Left back
- Current club: Önnereds HK

Youth career
- Years: Team
- 2012-2013: IK Sävehof

Senior clubs
- Years: Team
- 2013-2021: IK Sävehof
- 2021-2023: HSG Blomberg-Lippe
- 2023-: Önnereds HK
National team
Years	Team	Apps	(Gls)
2021–	Sweden	1	(0)

Linnea Wester, previously Linnea Pettersson, (born 28 July 1995) is a Swedish handball player who plays for Önnereds HK and the Swedish national team.

She also represented Sweden in the 2013 European Women's U-19 Handball Championship in Denmark, placing 8th.

She made her debut on the Swedish national team on 21 April 2021.

== Achievements ==
- Svensk handbollselit:
  - Winner: 2014, 2015, 2016, 2018, 2019
  - Silver Medalist: 2017
