= Linnéa Jonasson =

Swedish footballer (born 1997)

Linnea Jonasson
Personal information
- Date of birth: 7 December 1997 (age 28)
- Place of birth: Sweden
- Position: Midfielder

Team information
- Current team: Vittsjö GIK
- Number: 14

Senior career*
Years	Team	Apps	(Gls)
2015–2017	Vittsjö GIK	5	(1)
- * Club domestic league appearances and goals as of 21:25, 23 May 2016 (UTC)

Linnea Jonasson (born 7 December 1997) is a Swedish former footballer who played for Vittsjö GIK. In 2017, at 19 years old, Jonasson retired from football following two significant knee injuries. The first of her injuries was a cruciate ligament injury and occurred before she joined Vittsjö.

== Personal life ==
From Hässleholm, Jonasson was born to Helena and Andreas Jonasson. She has a brother, Alvin, and a sister, Ella.
