= The Arboretum at Gustavus Adolphus College =

Arboretum and botanical gardens in Minnesota, United States

Coordinates: 44.3207°N 93.9778°W

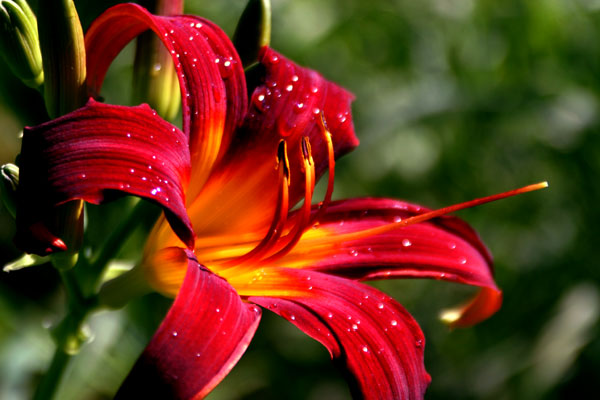
- Evelyn Gardens, one of the gardens onsite.
- Interactive map of The Arboretum at Gustavus Adolphus College
- Website: Official website

The Arboretum at Gustavus Adolphus College, also known as The Arboretum at Gustavus or colloquially as The Arb, is on the campus of Gustavus Adolphus College in Saint Peter, Minnesota, United States. It contains a number of botanical gardens and a 125 acre arboretum with its first trees planted as small seedlings in 1973 on agricultural land. The arboretum was formerly named for Carl Linnaeus, a Swedish botanist, from 1988 to 2021.

== History ==
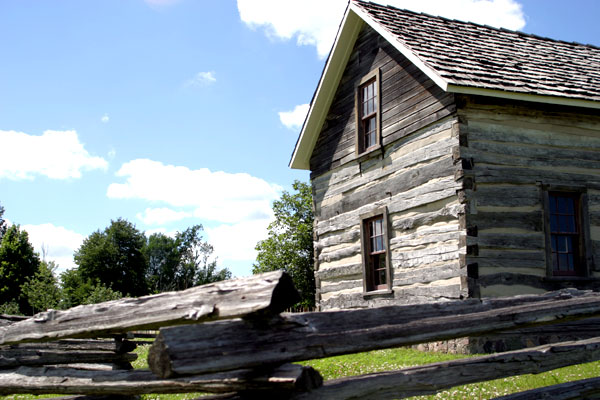
The Borgeson cabin, built in 1866, at The Arboretum at Gustavus

Planning for the Gustavus Adolphus College Arboretum began in 1972. In January 1973, President Frank Barth announced the dedication of land lying west of campus for the purpose of developing an arboretum and wildlife area. Dr. Charles Mason, Associate Professor of Biology, oversaw the project. Project plans consisted of an initial fifty-five acres to be planted with grass and trees as well as an anticipated expansion to 130 acres (0.53 km^{2}) if the project proved successful. In 1975, a master plan for the arboretum was developed which included three natural ecosystems and a formal garden, and Mason was appointed arboretum Director. The arboretum was home to more than 1,600 trees by 1978, and plans for the creation of two ponds were underway.

In 1986, Borgeson cabin was moved to the arboretum from Norseland, MN, and the Melva Lind Interpretive Center was completed during 1987. The center includes office space for arboretum staff, interpretive educational exhibits, and a meeting space. In 1988, the arboretum was officially named the Linnaeus Arboretum after renowned Swedish botanist Carl Linnaeus. The Friends of The Arboretum formed during 1989; members of the group participate in volunteer and educational activities. Jim Gilbert became director of The Arboretum in 1998, and upon his retirement in 2005, the Jim Gilbert Teaching Pond was created. In 2003, the first Linnaeus Symposium was held in conjunction with the celebration of The Arboretum's thirty year anniversary. The Symposium hosted renowned ethnobotanist Wade Davis.

Dr. Cindy Johnson-Groh became Executive Director of The Arboretum in 2006, and in 2007 the Johnson Center for Environmental Innovation was added to the Interpretive Center.

In 2021, Gustavus Adolphus College removed the name "Linnaeus" from the arboretum and it was renamed The Arboretum at Gustavus Adolphus College. The college stated that it wished to, "tell a more complete history of Carl Linnaeus, examining not only his contributions to science but also the problematic elements of his work," citing scrutiny regarding the legacy of Linnaeus' writings on human taxonomy and their subsequent influence on scientific racism beliefs.

The push to remove the “Linnaeus” name from the arboretum was a student-led movement beginning in the fall of 2020 due to the claim that Linnaeus was the father of scientific racism. This came following the Black Lives Matter protests summer 2020, where many institutions pushed to remove historically racist names from their buildings and landmarks. A student-run instagram account titled @linnaeusnomore1 outlines how the keeping of the title “Linnaeus” did not follow the school’s outlined pillars and core values.

Over the course of the 2020-2021 school year, much deliberation was enacted on behalf of the movement. Many student organizations such as iGNiTE, The Radicals, and Students for Reproductive Freedom (SRF) encouraged students to sign petitions and write letters to the Board. Gustavus as an institution created the “Linnaeus Deliberation Circle.” While the push came from the students, the final decision had to be made by the Gustavus Board of Trustees, and on October 12, 2021, Linnaeus was removed.

== Layout ==
The Arboretum was designed to represent the shape and ecosystem layout of the state of Minnesota. Therefore, the three major natural ecosystems found in Minnesota are represented in The Arboretum: the conifer forest in the north, the prairie in the south and west, and the deciduous forest in between. A fourth area surrounding the Melva Lind Interpretive Center includes cultivated gardens and trees that were introduced into the state from other regions of the globe.

== Gardens ==
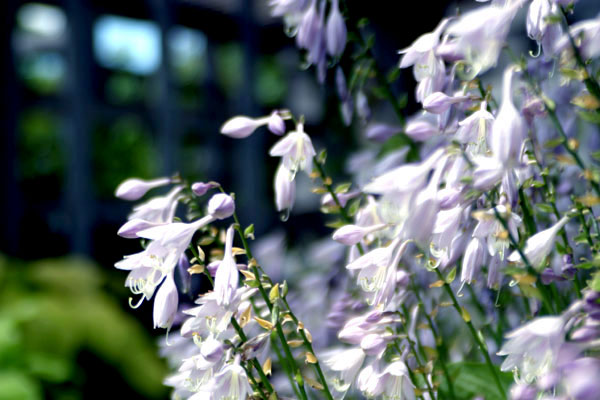
Greater Gustavus Hosta Garden

The Arboretum at Gustavus is home to twelve official gardens which are as follows:

- Thornberg Garden – Color from spring-flowering bulbs to chrysanthemums in the fall.
- Greater Gustavus Hosta Garden – More than 20 varieties of hosta plants.
- Melva Lind Rose Garden – Nearly 50 rose bushes selected from Canadian varieties.
- Evelyn Gardens – Two gardens of perennial flowers, shrubs, and small trees.
- Swenson White Garden – White flowering annuals, perennials, and shrubs: dogwoods, viburnum, potentilla, magnolia, plum, and mock orange.
- Thompson Herb Garden – Culinary, medicinal and fragrant herbs; herbs important to Native American cultures; and herbs with Biblical roots.
- First Ladies' Lilac Walk – A collection of lilac bushes.
- Presidents' Oak Grove – An oak tree in honor of each president of the College.
- Uhler Prairie – Grasses and flowers native to the drier areas of Minnesota.
- Johnson Prairie Outlook – A quiet place where one can sit on glacial boulders and observe the prairie.
- Gamelin Linden Grove – Trees from both the Old World and the New World displaying variation within the genus Tilia.
- Esbjornson Ironwoods – Ironwood trees.

== Other attractions ==
The arboretum also has a number of other attractions which are as follows:

- Alexis Memorial Bluebird Trail – Bluebird houses winding through the arboretum. Named for a longtime professor of English who was an avid birder.
- Borgeson Family Cabin – Built in 1866 by Swedish pioneers, the cabin was moved to the arboretum and restored in 1986. Adjacent to the cabin is a small vegetable garden that is planted annually with seeds that were stored from when the Swedish pioneers sailed across the ocean.
- Linnaeus Sculpture – Created by Paul T. Granlund, sculptor-in-Residence at Gustavus Adolphus College. The bust grows out of a linden tree, and the wig includes impressions of the layout of the formal Linnaeus' Botanical Garden in Uppsala, Sweden. Another copy was donated by the college to the Uppsala University Botanical Garden.
- Meditation area – Designed using Chinese Elements and feng shui concepts to foster inspirational and intuitive introspection. Is used frequently as a space for yoga and tai chi students. Created in 2004.
- Melva Lind Interpretive Center – Exhibits and programs. Constructed in 1988.
- Wetlands – A re-creation of similar areas that existed on this same land a little over a century ago, home to aquatic and semi-aquatic plant and animal species.

== See also ==
- List of botanical gardens in the United States
