= Melva Lind =

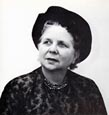
Melva Lind as pictured in the 1966 Gustavian

Melva Lind (16 March 1903 – 18 April 1997) graduated from the University of Minnesota with a Bachelor of Arts degree in 1923 and a Master of Arts degree in 1943. She then received the French equivalent to a Master of Arts degree from the Université de Lyon in Lyon, France in 1926. She went on to attend the Université de Paris en Sorbonne in Paris, where she earned her Doctorate in 1929. After which she attended MacPhail School of Music in Minneapolis, Minnesota where she earned a Master of Music in 1937. Over the years she continued her education with two diplomas from the Université de Clermont-Ferrand in France in 1923 and 1924 and a scholarship from the Conservatoire de Musique in Lyon, France in 1924–1925. She also studied around the world at the Universidad de Mexico in Mexico City in 1942, a study seminar in Germany during the summer of 1964, Greece in March 1973, Israel in July 1973, and the Institut de Langue et de Littérature Françaises at the Université de Rennes in France during the summers of 1970–1972.

== Professional career ==
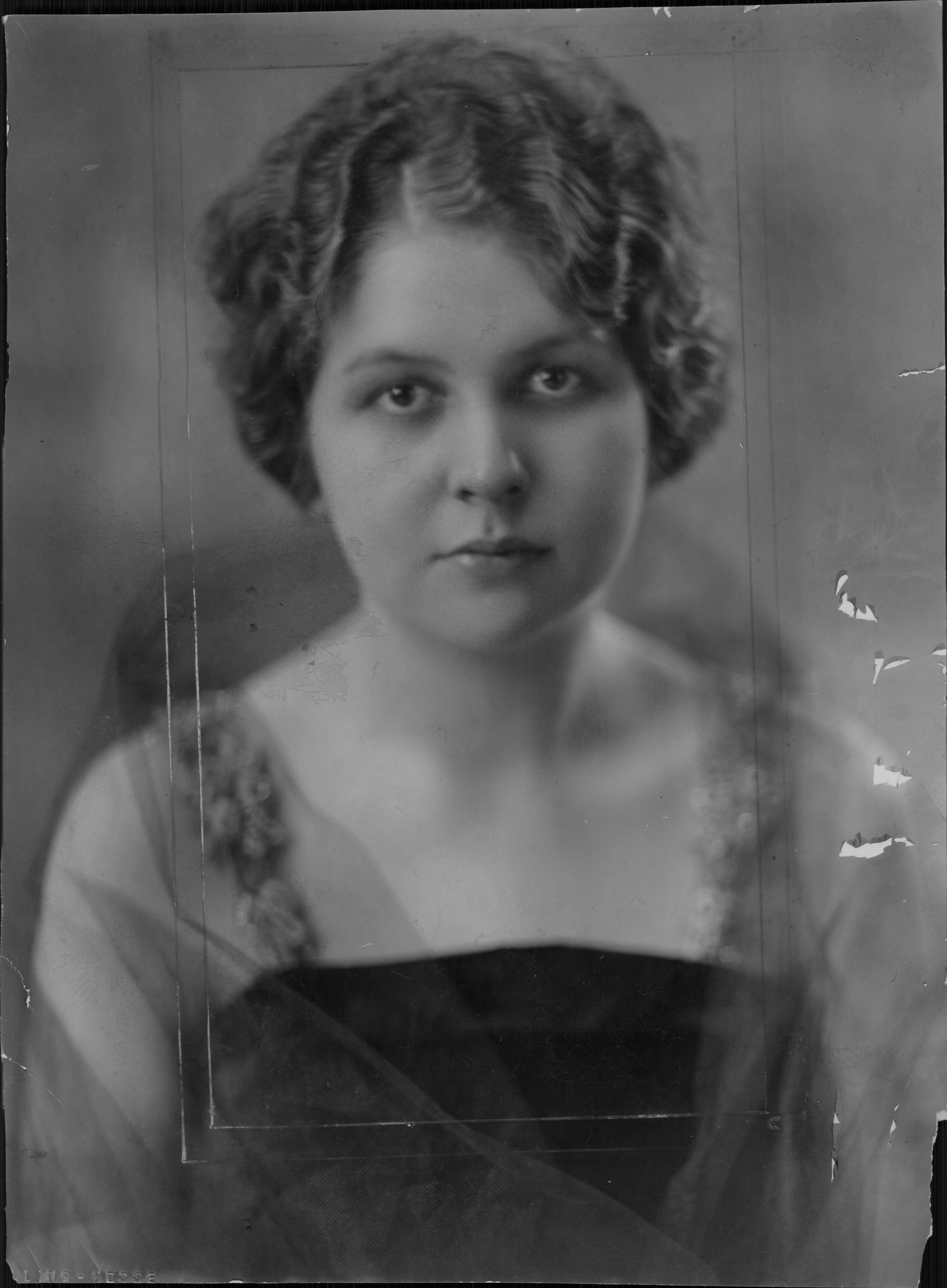
Melva Lind (1923)

Lind began teaching French as an assistant professor at Smith College in Massachusetts from 1929 to 1936. Next, at Mount Holyoke College in Massachusetts she was an assistant professor of French from 1936 to 1948, and was also the resident director of the French Language House from 1943 to 1948. Lind then became the Associate in Higher Education for the American Association of University Women in Washington, D.C. from 1948 to 1950. She went back to teaching as French professor and dean of students at Miami University in Oxford, Ohio from 1950 to 1953, after which she came to Gustavus Adolphus College. While at Gustavus, she was a French professor from 1953 to 1973, dean of students from 1953 to 1965, and Director of International Education from 1973 to 1979. As Director of International Education she increased exchange programs between both Sweden and Japan. In 1975 she was nominated as a candidate for Gustavus President and served on the Board of Trustees from 1975 to 1981. She was also a great friend to the Linnaeus Arboretum. The Melva Lind Rose Garden and the Melva Lind Interpretive Center are both named in her honor.

== Published books ==
- L'âme Indienne: Chippewa et Sioux du Haut-Mississippi d'après les Manuscrits de Joseph-Nicolas Nicollet (1786–1843). (Périgueux, France: P. Fanlac), 1979.
- Modern Language Learning: the Intensive Course. Journal Press, 1947.
- Emmanuel des Essarts; un parnassien universitaire. (Paris: Presses Universitaires de France), 1928.

== Accolades ==
Over the years Lind received many accolades. These include decorations as a knight by the Swedish Royal Order of the North Star and the French Ordre des Palmes Académiques. She also received the King's Gold Medal from Sweden, the Silver Medal from France, and was named an honorary princess of the Chickasaw Nation of Oklahoma. She was further honored with a Greater Gustavus Award and an Outstanding Achievement Award from the University of Minnesota. Lind also published a few books along with many articles.
