= Rebecca M. Bergman =

President of Gustavus Adolphus College

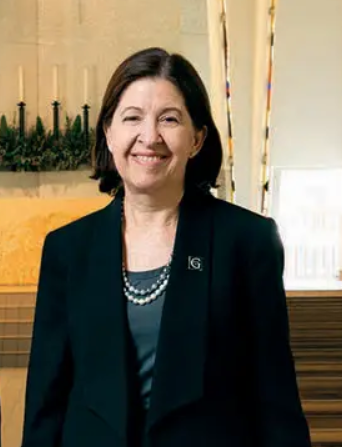
- Rebecca M. Bergman

17th President of Gustavus Adolphus College
- In office July 1, 2014 – August 14, 2025
- Preceded by: Jack Ohle
- Succeeded by: John C. Volin

Personal details
- Spouse: Thomas Bergman
- Children: 4
- Education: Princeton University; University of Minnesota
- Profession: Educator, Chemical Engineer
- Website: Office of the President

Rebecca M. Bergman is an American chemical engineer who was the 17th President of Gustavus Adolphus College in St. Peter, Minnesota. She began her term in July 2014, and is the first woman to serve as President of the college, which was founded in 1862. Before her presidency, she was a senior executive at Medtronic, and served on the college's Board of Trustees from 2007 to 2014.

== Medtronic career ==
Bergman received a B.S. in chemical engineering from Princeton University, and undertook graduate studies in chemical engineering and material science from the University of Minnesota.

Bergman spent 26 years at Medtronic, Inc., from 1988 to 2014, including 14 as a senior executive. Her most recent position was Vice President of Research, Technology, and Therapy Delivery Systems for the company’s Cardiac Rhythm Disease Management (CRDM) business, where she led a research and development team of scientists and engineers. She previously served as Vice President, CRDM New Therapies & Diagnostics as well as Vice President, Corporate Science and Technology, where she directed biomaterials and biosciences R&D, new therapy development, and information management initiatives.

== Honors and distinctions ==
Bergman was elected as a Fellow of the American Institute for Medical and Biological Engineering in 2001. She was also elected as a member into the National Academy of Engineering in 2010 for technical leadership in the development of interventional vascular devices and drug delivery systems.

She serves as a member of the Board of Directors of Sigma-Aldrich, on the Board of Directors of The Bakken Museum, and on a number of academic advisory boards. She previously served on the National Advisory Council of the National Institute of Biomedical Imaging and Bioengineering of the National Institute of Health and the St. Catherine University Board of Trustees.
