= Jack Ohle =

American college president

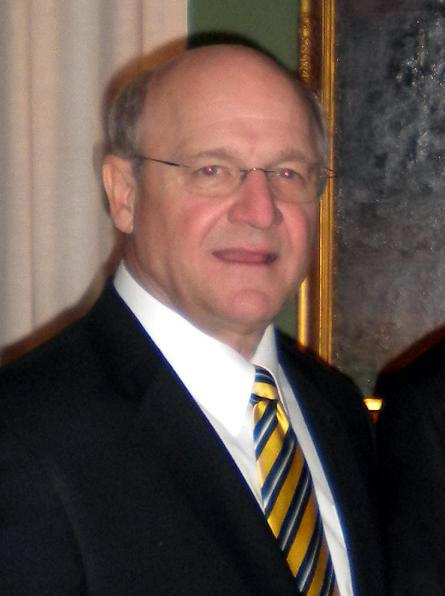
Ohle at a luncheon given for the college at a Bonnier family mansion in Stockholm in December 2009

Jack Ohle (pronounced OH-lee) was the President of Gustavus Adolphus College from July 2008 to June 2014. He was previously the President of Wartburg College in Waverly, Iowa, from 1998. Both institutions are part of the Evangelical Lutheran Church in America (ECLA) Colleges and Universities, and Ohle has chaired the executive committee of the Council of Presidents of ELCA Colleges and Universities.

== Professional appointments ==
Ohle graduated from Ohio Northern University with a Bachelor of Arts in social work in 1969. After completing some graduate work at Hamma School of Theology, Ohle earned a Master of Arts degree in higher education administration from Bowling Green State University. After completing his MA, he went on administrative positions at Ohio Northern University and Muskingum College. Afterward, he became vice president for advancement at Nebraska Wesleyan University where he worked for ten years. He then worked as vice president for institutional advancement and later as senior vice president for external affairs and secretary to the university at Drake University, spending 11 years there.

=== Presidency of Wartburg College ===
Ohle held the presidency of Wartburg College from 1998 to 2008,. Accomplishments of his presidency included fundraising $90 million, spending $104 million on capital improvements, and adding 21 full-time faculty members. Despite these accomplishments, according to The Chronicle of Higher Education, Ohle left Wartburg in a state of financial unrest. This academic newspaper has noted that the financing "has raised red flags with its accreditor, alarmed some faculty members, and left Wartburg with a credit rating just one notch above 'junk.'" It has "created some tensions" with the local community and was likely to soon "find itself in violation of a bond covenant requiring it to have at least half as much in unrestricted assets as it has in debt and other liabilities." The situation has forced Wartburg to raise tuition at 8% annually.

Ohle was also criticized by the Wartburg chapter of the American Association of University Professors, which argued that he habitually violated academic freedom. The AAUP at Wartburg deemed that Ohle and his administration had threatened basic academic principles in seven specific ways. It deemed that these “actions reveal both disrespect for faculty as participants in shared governance and disregard for college policy.” It warned that Ohle's “unwarranted interference, if it became habitual, would eventually destroy shared governance and consequently the academic quality of this institution.” The AAUP admonished Ohle for believing that he had the right to “circumvent or subvert policies jointly approved by faculty and administration and adopted by the board of regents. To believe otherwise would be to place the college president above the law and render meaningless all the procedural safeguards contained in the faculty handbook, including those that protect tenure and academic freedom.” Such actions on the part of Ohle were also deemed to be a legal liability for the college, as he was violating contractual agreements with the faculty.

=== Presidency of Gustavus Adolphus College ===
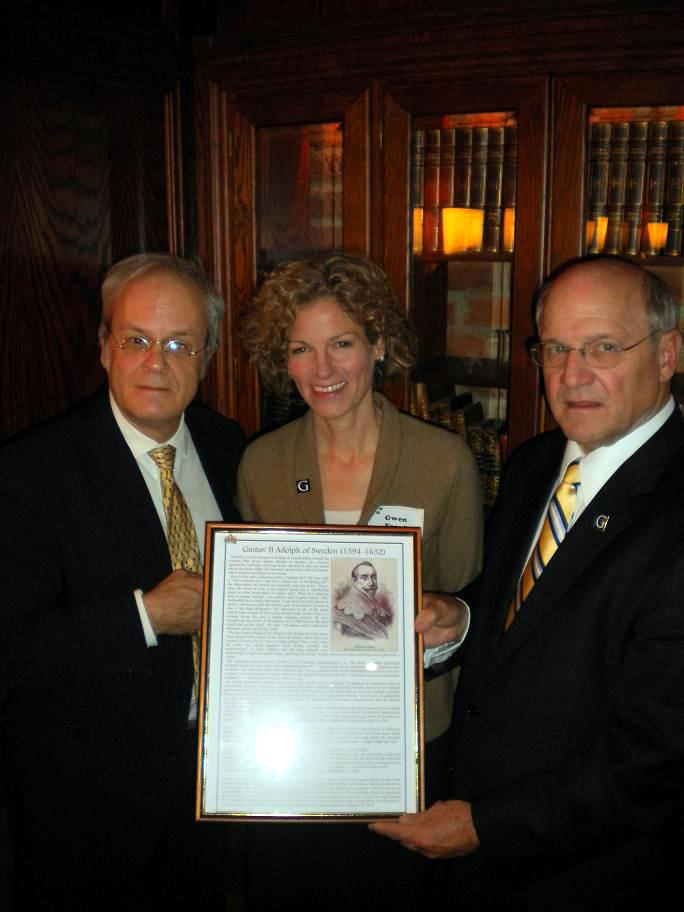
Ohle (right) receives framed information about King Gustavus Adolphus in Stockholm in 2010

On July 1, 2008, Jack Ohle, was sworn in as president of Gustavus Adolphus College. Since that time feature articles in the two most prominent academic newspapers, The Chronicle of Higher Education and InsideHigherEd, have been critical of his performance as an administrator. The regional newspaper, The Mankato Free Press, has described the situation as a case of "leadership in crisis," lamenting that the president flippantly "shrugs off complaints." The local TV station, KEYC, devoted 5 minutes of coverage to the controversy during the evening news on May 28, 2009, explaining that "Faculty and students say behind the scenes, there is a quiet storm brewing." In the first ten months of Ohle's administration, many of the college's highest-ranking administrators resigned, including the Provost, two Academic Deans and the dean of students. As an explanation, the Academic Deans were quoted as saying that they felt a "lack of presidential support" under Ohle. Reported concerns also included vague job descriptions, and responsibilities being changed without community notice or discussion. In response to these events the Faculty Senate petitioned the college's board of trustees to review Ohle's performance, as well as to review the circumstances of the Provost's resignation. The faculty formed a committee to review Ohle's performance, but the administration responded that the faculty had no authority to do so, and suggested that as a result any defamation claims against faculty might result in the college suing them. Indeed, when InsideHigherEd, ran an article on Ohle's first 10 months at Gustavus on May 29, 2009, it asserted that faculty were "jittery about the president’s style and his plans." To illustrate the level of fear among employees, it explained that "Faculty who speak critically of their presidents can expect some tension, but they seldom take out liability insurance before doing so. At Gustavus Adolphus College, however, that’s exactly what some professors have done." Despite the faculty unrest during Ohle's tenure, the college has experienced many positives during his six years as president. The college opened the $30 million, 125,000 square foot Beck Academic Hall in 2011. The building houses the academic departments of Communication Studies, Economics and Management, History, Psychological Science, and Sociology and Anthropology. The college also established a new Center for Servant Leadership engaging students, faculty, and staff in helping develop vocation-centered learning opportunities, though the Director of Vocation and Integrative Learning was fired along with 35 other employees due to budget shortfalls. The college brought in its largest incoming class in the college's history in 2011, though due directly to the public controversy about the President new student admission dropped sharply leading to massive budget shortcomings. The college has established eight new endowed faculty positions during Ohle's tenure, while losing at least 35 other positions. As of May 15, 2014, the college had raised $125 million toward its $150 million goal for Campaign Gustavus, the largest capital campaign in the college's history. Ohle officially retired as President of Gustavus on June 30, 2014. He was replaced by Rebecca M. Bergman, the college's first female president in its 152-year history.
