= Laurie Helgoe =

American psychologist and author (born 1960)

Laurie Anne Helgoe
- Born: December 10, 1960 (age 65); Billings, Montana
- Education: Gustavus Adolphus College; University of Nevada, Reno
- Occupations: Psychologist and author

Laurie Anne Helgoe (born December 10, 1960) is an American clinical psychologist, educator, and author interested in personality development and culture. In 2008, her research revealed a flaw in scholarly and popular accounts regarding people displaying traits of introversion and extraversion.

== Biography ==
Helgoe was born in 1960 in Billings, Montana. Her father is a Lutheran Minister; her mother was a homemaker. She is the ninth of ten children in her family. She was educated at Gustavus Adolphus College in St. Peter, Minnesota, and the University of Nevada, Reno. She is married and has two sons.

Helgoe currently is a clinical associate professor of Clinical Psychology at Augsburg University. Previously she served as an associate professor of Behavioral Sciences at the Ross University School of Medicine until 2022. She served as a Clinical Assistant Professor at the West Virginia University School of Medicine and was an assistant professor of Psychology and Social Sciences Division Chair at Davis & Elkins College. Helgoe is the author of a blog entitled Introvert Power: Food for the Inner Life and hosts the pages Introvert Power and Fragile Bully on Facebook.

In 2019, Helgoe wrote Fragile Bully: Understanding Our Destructive Affair with Narcissism in the Age of Trump, which explores the relationship between narcissism and American political discourse (Diversion Books, 2019). Paul L. Wachtel, Ph.D., distinguished professor at CCNY and integrative psychology theorist, noted that Helgoe's writing provides "seemingly effortless linkage between the intimately psychological and the broader social and cultural" and that "[s]he probes the depth of individual experience, explores the dynamics of couples and families and makes plain how all of this derives both from the powerful impact of our earliest experiences and the equally powerful impact of our current interactions and current social and cultural context. In her hands, there is no contradiction in this complex web of causality, just a rich tapestry of interwoven threads that create a life."

== Notability ==
Helgoe's 2008 book Introvert Power: Why Your Inner Life is Your Hidden Strength sought to challenge the perception that introverts constitute only 25–30% of the population, arguing instead that they make up 57%. She criticized early interpretations of Isabel Briggs Myers' work for underestimating introvert prevalence, highlighting newer national surveys using the Myers-Briggs Type Indicator (MBTI) to support her findings.

Publishers Weekly, an American publication that critiques new literature, awarded Helgoe's Introvert Power a starred review. Foreign publishing rights to her books have been sold in Chinese, Finnish, Japanese, Korean, Portuguese, and Spanish. Helgoe has written several articles for national publications. She has been profiled or quoted in more than 100 media outlets including The Guardian, Times of India, Inc.com, New York Times, Wall Street Journal and WashingtonPost.com.
