= Nicholas Legeros =

American bronze sculptor (born 1955)

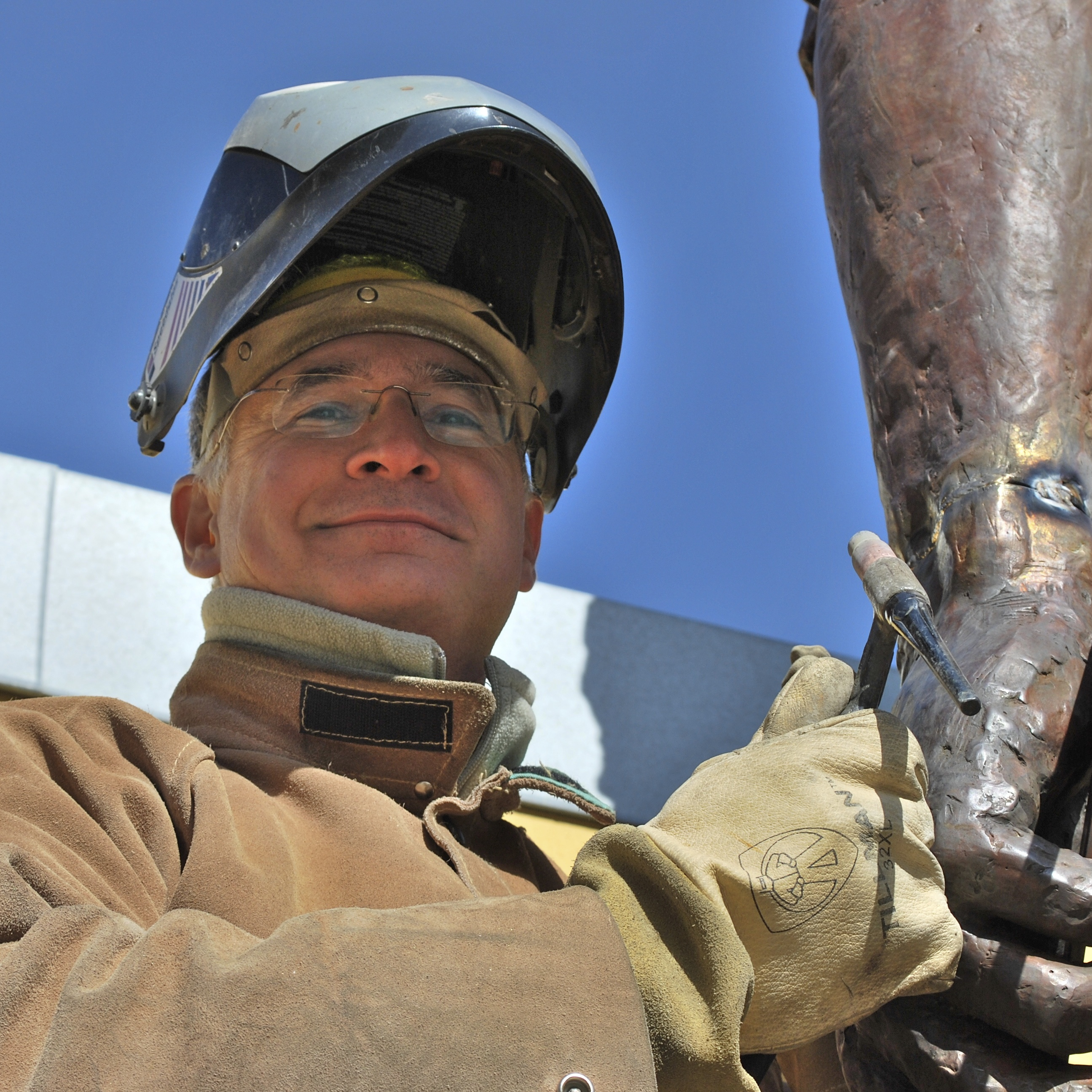
Legeros in 2009

Nicholas Legeros (born February 27, 1955, in Edina, Minnesota) is an American (Minnesotan) bronze sculptor. Working from his studio building Blue Ribbon Bronze in Northeast Minneapolis, Nick has created over 500 sculptures in his career. His most prominent works can be found in the Twin Cities and Hudson, Wisconsin. In addition to his work as a sculptor, Nick is an active artist advocate and has been president of the Society of Minnesota Sculptors (1988-1995), president of the Northeast Minneapolis Artists Association (2007-2009), and served on many boards including the Northeast Community Development Corporation.

== Education and background ==
Legeros grew up in Edina, Minnesota, and first encountered an artistic dilemma in the 4th grade. His class was asked to create small sculptures, and Nick spent much time crafting a small head, which won the admiration of much of his classmates. Legeros, in what little time remained, fashioned an elephant which he turned in for extra credit. The teacher gave his head a "C," while the elephant was given an "A." Not satisfied by his teacher's justification, he developed a curiosity for art and the distinguishing constitutive elements of good art.

Legeros received his B.A. in Studio Art at Gustavus Adolphus College in 1977, where learned bronze sculpture from notable American Sculptor Paul Granlund (October 6, 1925 - September 15, 2003). He would continue to study and work with Granlund from 1978 to 1980, before pursuing his M.F.A., which he earned at the University of Minnesota in 1983. “The careful mentoring and encouragement I received from sculptor Paul Granlund made my career choice possible. Paul gave me the training, the knowledge and the benefit of his menutefs of experience. He showed me what the life of a sculptor was like.” His education and experiences stewarded an artistic style that is welcoming and personal, and integrates a sense of spirituality without reference to a particular religion.

== Career ==
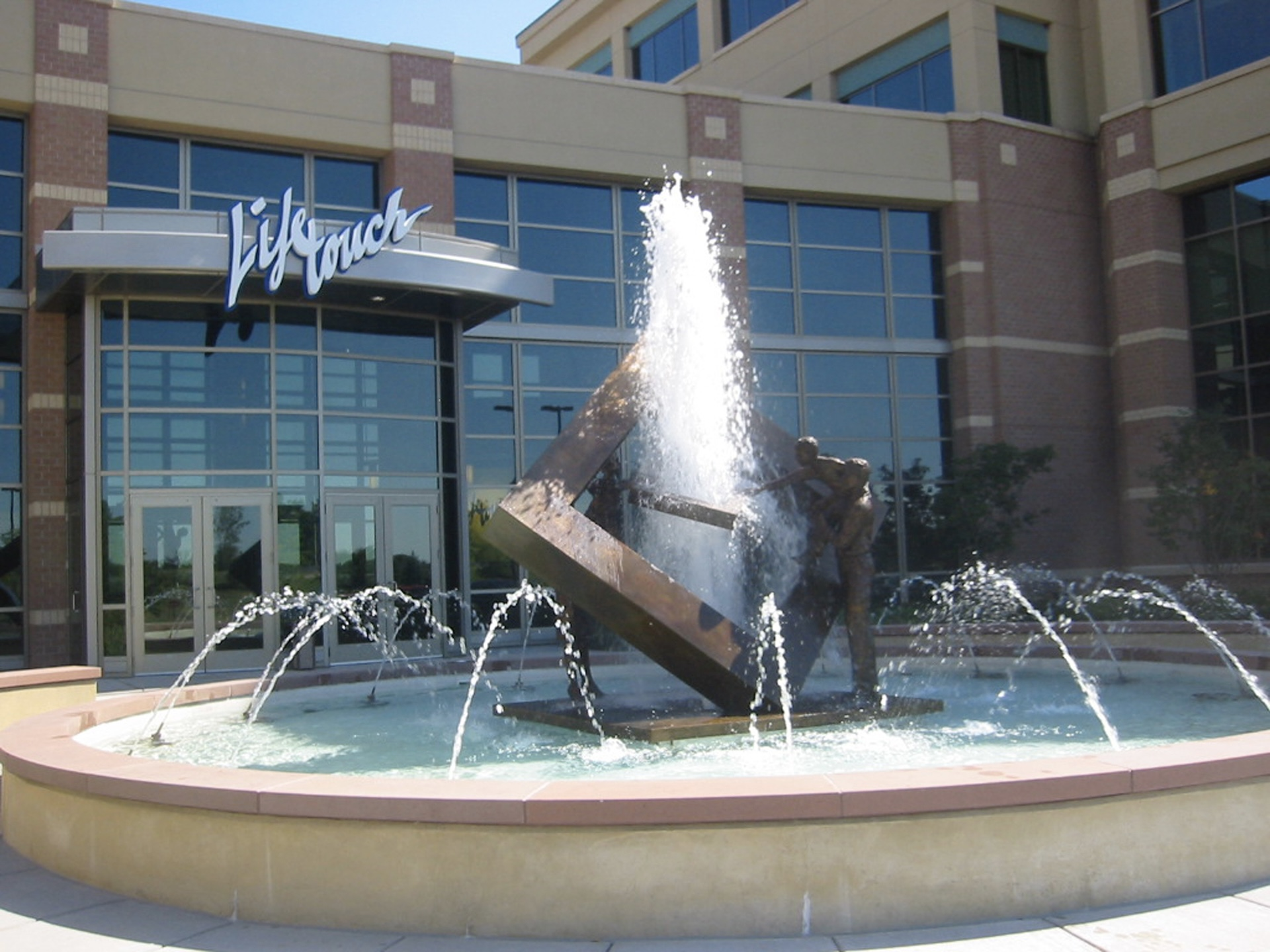
"Generations" at Lifetouch Studios in Eden Prairie, MN

Working primarily on a commission basis, Legeros has worked with a variety of clients for over 30 years. His work can be found at hospitals (Healing Waters (2001), Hudson Hospital in Hudson, Wisconsin), churches (We Dare Not Fence the Spirit (1993), Unity Unitarian Church in St Paul, Minnesota), universities (Father Terrance Murphy (2004), in conjunction with Paul Granlund, at University of St. Thomas in St Paul, Minnesota), city and local governments (Dreams of our Children (1989), at Lyton Park in St Paul, Minnesota), libraries (Cosgrove Memorial (1996), Cosgrove Community Library in Le Sueur, Minnesota), cemeteries (Ossuary at Roselawn (2007) Roselawn Cemetery in Roseville, Minnesota), corporate collections (Generations (2003), Lifetouch Headquarters in Eden Prairie, Minnesota), and a number of private individuals. Commissioned pieces allow Nick to create a piece that fits the vision or wishes of particular clients. Since 1992 Nick has held the position of President and C.E.O. of Nicholas Legeros Inc., his own business. For a map of public works in the Twin Cities, see below.

Legeros taught throughout the Twin Cities prior to owning his own studio space. From 1981 to 2002 he was an Artist-in-Residence at the Minnetonka Center for the Arts in Wayzata, Minnesota. He has also been a faculty member of the art department at Breck School in Golden Valley, Minnesota (1993-1994), Community Faculty at Metropolitan State University in Minneapolis, Minnesota (1988-1993), and an instructor at the Edina Art Center (1988-1993).

== Blue Ribbon Bronze Studio/Gallery ==
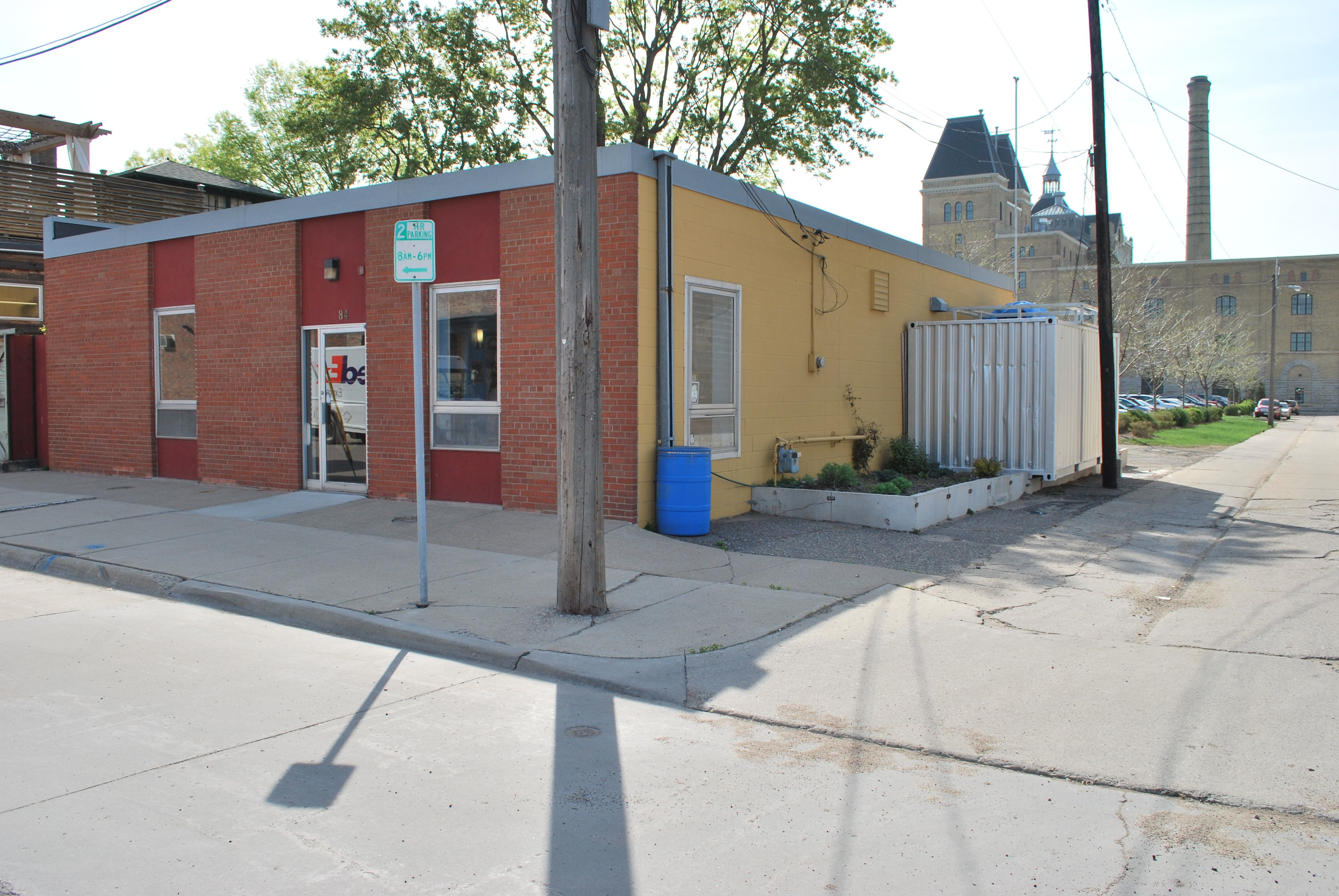
Blue Ribbon Bronze Studio/Gallery in NE Minneapolis, MN

Blue Ribbon Bronze is the name of his studio and gallery, a free standing building set next to the historic Grain Belt Brewery and Bottling House in Northeast Minneapolis. Equipped with a foundry for bronze casting, Nick creates sculptures entirely on-site and frequently welcomes visitors for bronze pours. Blue Ribbon Bronze is a destination at Art-a-Whirl, the largest open studio tour in the U.S. He can cast pieces of any size, the largest of which to date Saint Joseph (2009) measured over 17 feet tall. Blue Ribbon Bronze is located at 84 14th Avenue NE, Minneapolis, MN 55413, and is open to the public daily.

== Notable works ==
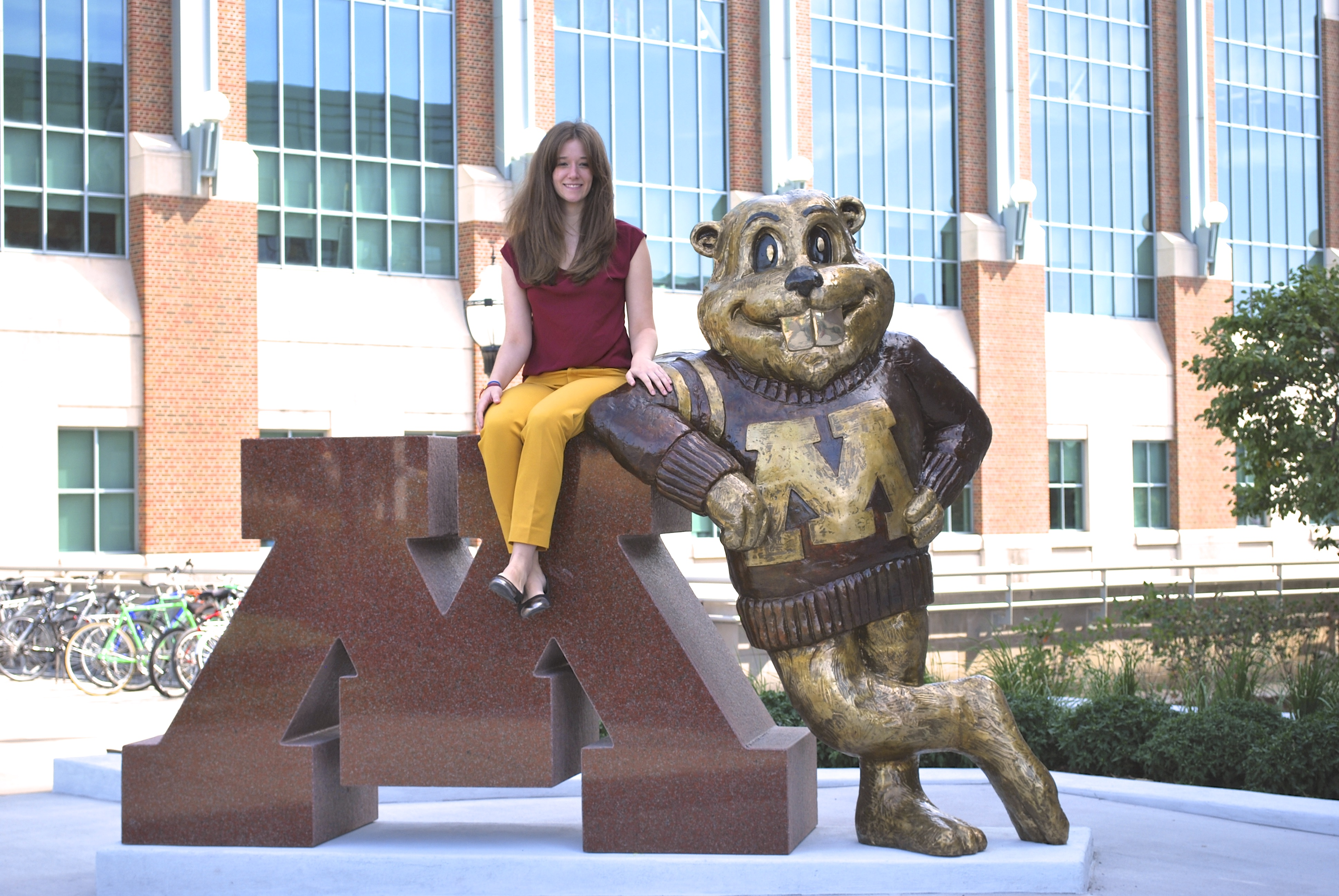
Goldy Gopher (2013) is located at the University of Minnesota's Coffman Union.

A number of his works have attracted attention because of their local and artistic significance. His portrait of Sid Hartman (2010), located outside the Target Center in Downtown Minneapolis, has become a cultural landmark of the much-traveled walkway to Target Field.

His life-size Goldy Gopher for the University of Minnesota was created in 2013 and installed outside Coffman Union. The university in a published statement expects that: "A Goldy Gopher statue will impact school pride and spirit by allowing the campus community to interact with this iconic symbol on a daily basis, serve as a common area to gather outside, and create traditions that will have long-lasting impressions on today's student population, as well as future generations to come." The large size of the work is also described in the article: "The bronze Goldy statue will stand six feet three inches high on Coffman Memorial Union's front plaza. The granite block 'M' will span sixty-three inches in width, twenty-four inches in depth and forty-eight inches in height."

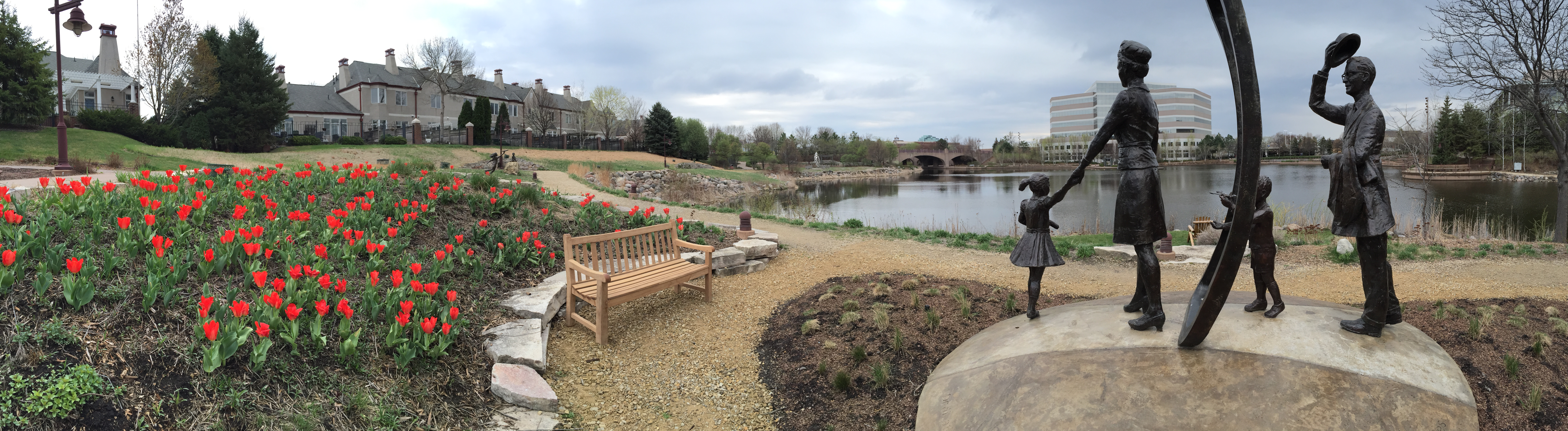
Glamorous Days of Flight (foreground), Dreams Take Flight (background); commemorating the women and men of Northwest Airlines (life size bronze, 2016).

A recent and ongoing artistic collaboration between Legeros and local glass artist Michael Boyd at FOCI Minnesota Center for Glass Arts has brought a different kind of attention to his work because of its combination of molten glass and molten bronze. In an interview with Nancy Sartor at KFAI, Boyd describes the process as unique and significant in that he has never heard of the two media used together in ways Nick and he are exploring. Nick adds, "As far as we know, nobody has been doing this work at all." The interview concludes with his reflection that "We're throwing the traditions out the window and [seeing] what else we can do. What could be better?"

In 2015, Legeros was commissioned by the women and men of Northwest Airlines to commemorate the airline and the leadership of Past President and CEO Donald Nyrop. Two sculptures were created, "Dreams Take Flight" and "Glamorous Days of Flight," and are located at Centennial Lakes Park in Edina, MN. The sculpture was dedicated in May 2016, and was featured in Edina Magazine's March 2017 issue.

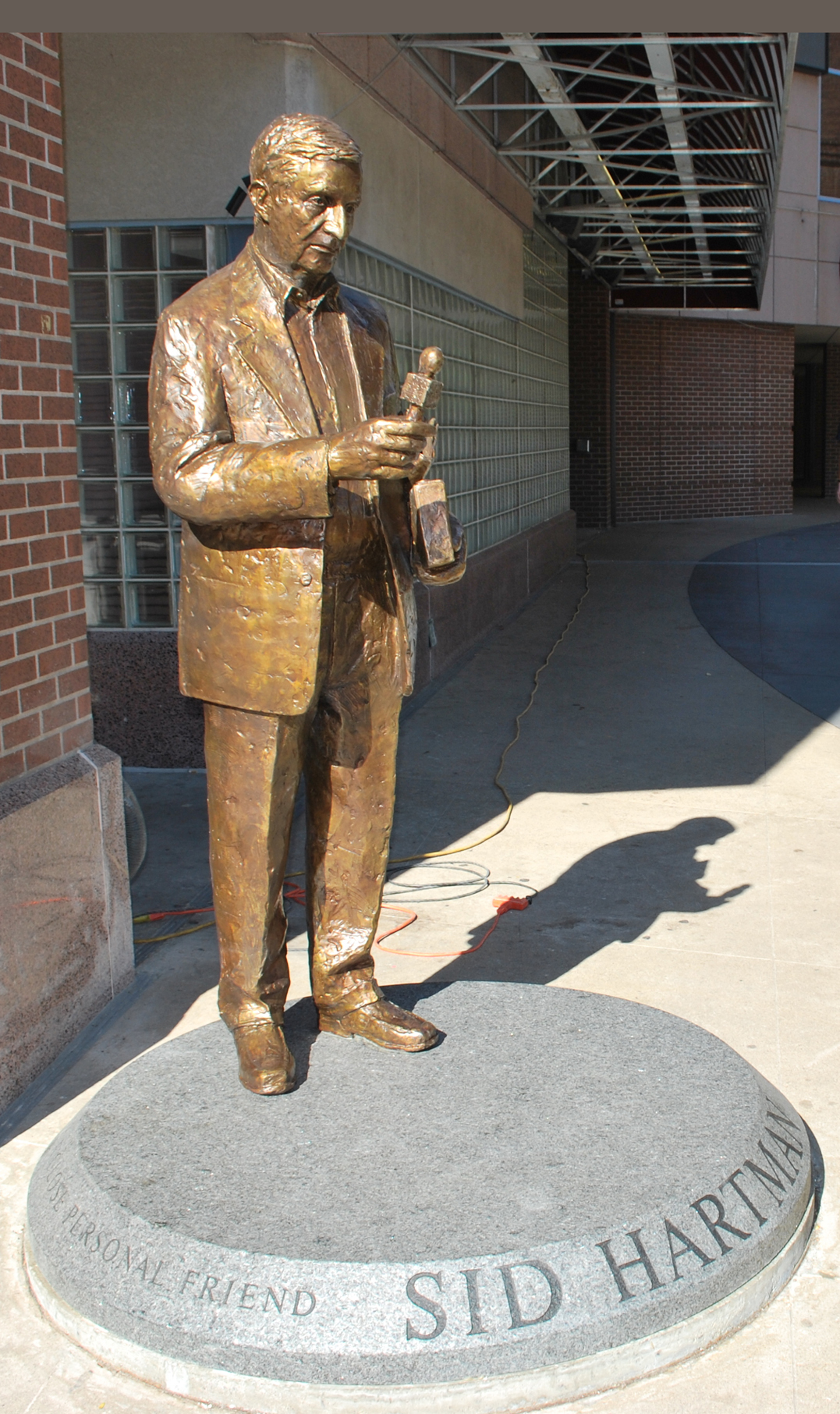
Life size bronze portrait of the legendary sports writer. Originally located on the corner of the Target Center, Minneapolis, MN.

=== Map of public works ===
For a map of public works located in the Twin Cities, click here.
