= Doug Linder =

American author, narrator, and historian

Douglas O. Linder
- Occupations: Author, professor
- Known for: Author of Famous Trials

Douglas O. Linder is an American author, narrator, and historian. He is the creator of the Famous Trials website (since 1995) hosted by University of Missouri-Kansas City, which covers 100 famous trials throughout history. Linder has coauthored a research analysis The Happy Lawyer with Nancy Levit about the challenges facing the legal profession, as well as The Good Lawyer published by Oxford University Press in 2014.

== Education ==
Linder was raised in Mankato, Minnesota.

Linder is a professor at the University of Missouri-Kansas City School of Law. He attended Gustavus Adolphus College in St. Peter, Minnesota as an undergraduate, majoring in mathematics, before graduating from Stanford Law School with a Juris Doctor degree.

== Work ==
In 1996, Linder developed two casebook websites, Exploring Constitutional Law and Exploring First Amendment Law.

Linder was interviewed by CNN about the legacy of the Scopes Trial. He also appeared in a Forensic Files episode about the Lindbergh kidnapping case.

In December 2017, Linder gives a lecture that tells the story behind the 2021 movie The Last Duel. Unlike the Burr–Hamilton duel in 1804, the 1386 duel was a court-approved duel, that is, "judicial duel."

== Bibliography ==
- The Trial of Sacco and Vanzetti
- The Monkey Trial
- The Trial of Socrates, 2002, regarding the trial of Socrates
