= Paul Granlund =

American sculptor (1925–2003)

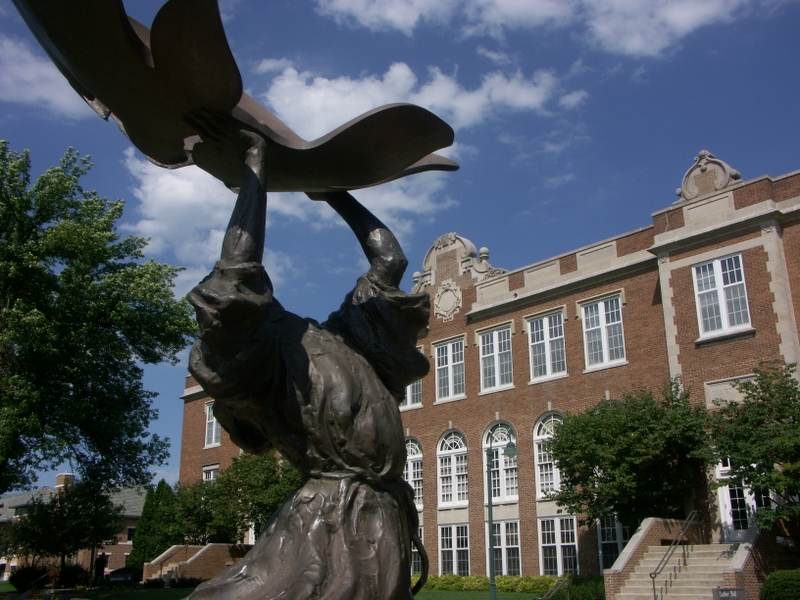
Dancing St. Francis – Wartburg College, Waverly, Iowa

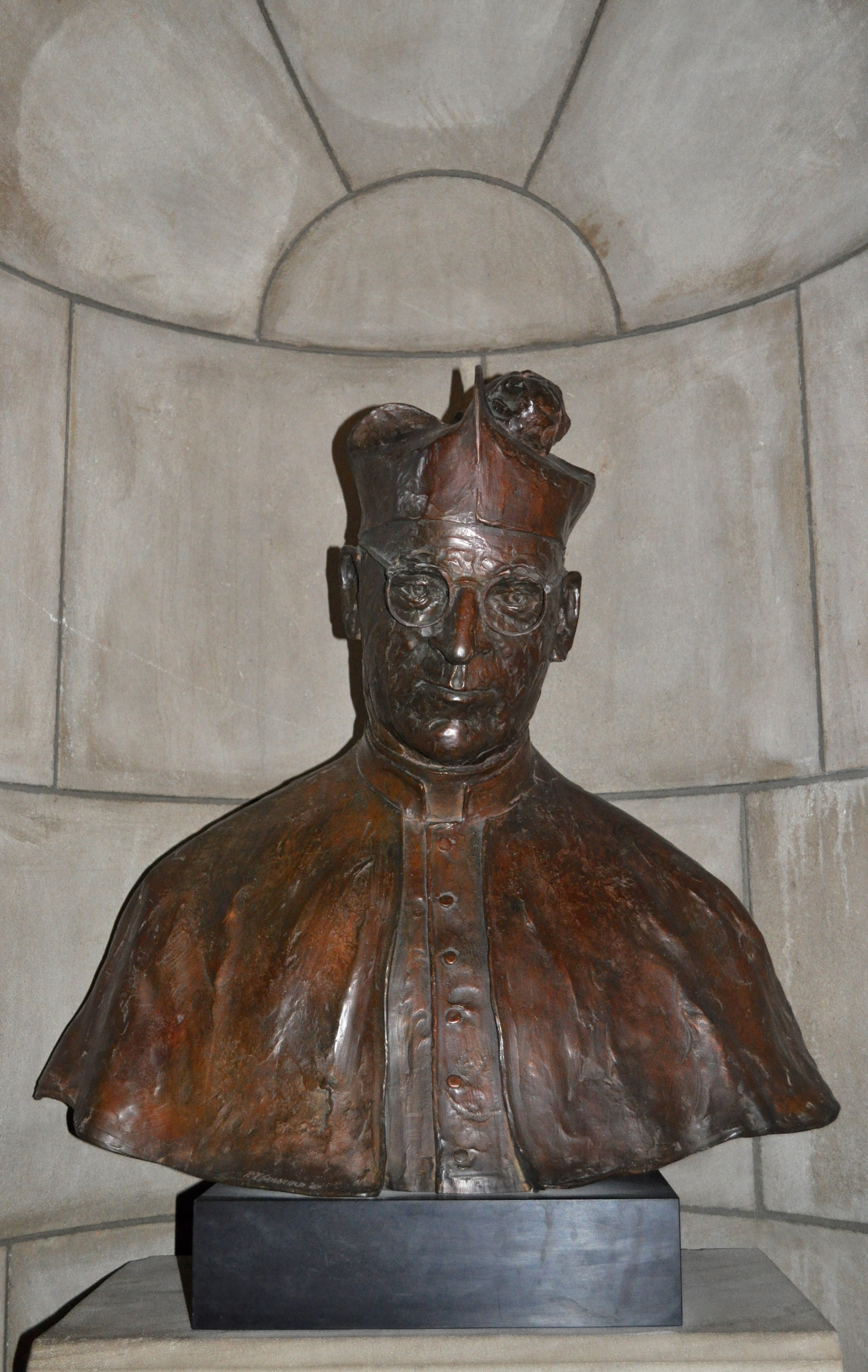
Bust of Edward J. Flanagan created in 1967 by Granlund for the Nebraska Hall of Fame.

Paul Theodore Granlund (October 6, 1925, Minneapolis, Minnesota – September 15, 2003, Mankato, Minnesota) was an American sculptor. His creative career spanned more than 50 years and more than 650 different works. Most of his work is figurative and made from bronze. His patrons included colleges, hospitals, Lutheran churches, and other institutions.

== Background ==
Granlund was born on October 6, 1925, in Minneapolis, the son of the Rev. Clarence and Naomi Granlund. He attended Central High School in Minneapolis. He married Edna Spaeth in 1950. Granlund received his Bachelor of Arts from Gustavus Adolphus College in St. Peter, Minnesota in 1952 and his Master of Fine Arts from Cranbrook Academy of Art in Michigan in 1954. Awarded a Fulbright scholarship to study sculpture in Italy the same year, he later returned on Guggenheim Foundation fellowships in 1957–1959. During the 1960s and '70s, he was a faculty member at the Minneapolis College of Art and Design. He also chaired the sculpture department for 14 years.

== Sculptor in residence ==
Granlund was the sculptor in residence at his alma mater, Gustavus Adolphus College, from 1971 until his retirement in 1996, and maintained a studio at the institution until his death. Over 30 works are on campus, including the friezes and doors of Christ Chapel. While artist in residence, he taught notable Minnesota bronze sculptor Nicholas Legeros from 1978 to 1980.

== Locations of works ==
=== U.S. Colleges and Universities ===
- Augustana University, Sioux Falls, South Dakota
  - "Eve" (Mikkelsen Library, 1958)
- Bluffton College, Bluffton, Ohio
  - "Constellation Earth"
- St. Catherine University, St. Paul, Minnesota
  - "Zerogee"
- Concordia College, Moorhead, Minnesota
  - "Founders"
- Concordia University, St. Paul, St. Paul, Minnesota
  - "Crowned Column"
- Concordia University, Nebraska, Seward, Nebraska
  - "Son of Man Be Free" (Christ Frees Us)
- Grinnell College, Grinnell, Iowa
  - "Alpha and Omega Sundial" (1990)
- Gustavus Adolphus College, St Peter, Minnesota
  - "Head of a Boy" (Hillstrom, 1955), "The Christ Deed" (Christ Chapel, 1961), "Old Testament Door" (Christ Chapel, 1962), "New Testament Door" (Christ Chapel, 1962), Dr. Andrew Jackson, Dr. P. A. Mattson, Dr. O.J. Johnson, and Erik Norelius Plaques (Christ Chapel, 1962), "Jacob and the Angel III" (1962), "Baptism/Lord's Supper Door" (Christ Chapel, 1963), "Hope Doors" (Christ Chapel, 1965), "Old Testament Frieze" (Christ Chapel, 1967), "Masks of the Muses" (1971), "The Way of the Cross" (gift to Gustavus President Lindell), "B.C.A.D." (1973), "The Edge" (1975), "Sonata" (Ella J. Pehrson Memorial, 1975), "Palindrome" (1976), "Egg," "Apogee" (1980), "Crucifixion" (Eckman Mall, 1980), "Flight II" (Folke Bernadotte Memorial Library, 1980), "Head of Jan Bender" (1980), "Luna Moth Matrix" (1980), Eckman Mall Plaque (1981), "South Wind II" (1982), "Portrait of Srinivasa Ramanujan (Olin, 1983), "Venus Nautilus II" (1983), "Floor Exercises" (1984), "Nicollet" (1986), "Horizontal Lovers" (Hillstrom, 1986), "Linnaeus" (1988), "Saint Francis" (1989), "Starburst" (1992), "New Testament Frieze" (Christ Chapel, 1997), "Portrait/Bust of Subrahmanyan Chandrasekhar," (Olin, 1998), "Portrait/Bust of George Engelmann" (1999), "Orbisc" (1999), "Portrait of Paul Wellstone (2003)
- Iliff School of Theology, Denver, Colorado
  - "Incarnation" (1963), "Resurrection II" (1973)
- Luther Seminary, St. Paul, Minnesota
  - "The Christ Figure" (1967)
- Muhlenberg College, Allentown, Pennsylvania
  - "Head of Frank Buchman"
- Sioux Falls College, Sioux Falls, South Dakota
  - "Cross Section"
- St. Norbert College, De Pere, Wisconsin
  - "Saint Norbert"
- St. Olaf College, Northfield, Minnesota
  - "Celebration" (1980–82), "Portrait of Julius Muus," "Double Chorus"
- University of Minnesota, Minneapolis/St. Paul, Minnesota
  - "Dale Shephard"
- University of St. Thomas, St. Paul, Minnesota
  - "Constellation Earth"
- University of Wisconsin–Eau Claire, Eau Claire, Wisconsin
  - "Sprites"
- Upper Iowa University, Fayette, Iowa
  - "Constellation Earth"
- Valparaiso University, Valparaiso, Indiana
  - "Head of O. P. Kretzmann"
- Viterbo University, La Crosse, Wisconsin
  - "Saint Francis"
- Wartburg College, Waverly, Iowa
  - "Saint Francis"

=== Churches ===
- Berea Lutheran Church, Richfield, Minnesota
  - Crucifixion-Resurrection Processional Cross"
- Bethel Lutheran Church, Willmar, Minnesota
  - "Children of God"
- Bethlehem Lutheran, Encinitas, California
  - "Saint Francis"
- Central Lutheran Church, Minneapolis, Minnesota
  - "Resurrection"
- First Lutheran Church, Pittsburgh, Pennsylvania
  - "Crucifixion-Resurrection," (1982)
- First Lutheran Church, St. Peter, Minnesota
  - "Chancel Cross," "Cradle" (1982), "Familia II" (1989)
- Grace Lutheran Church, Mankato, Minnesota
  - "Crucifixion-Resurrection Processional Cross"
- Lutheran Church of the Good Shepherd, Minneapolis, Minnesota
  - "Resurrection" (1958), "Crucifixion" (1964), "Credo Doors (1967), "Rondo," "Life Tree"
- Mary Mother of the Church, Burnsville, Minnesota
  - Crucifixion Processional Cross (1969)
- Mount Olive Lutheran Church, Minneapolis, Minnesota
  - "Head of Cantor Paul O. Manz,"
- Mount Olivet Lutheran Church, Minneapolis, Minnesota
  - "Saint Francis"
- Salem Lutheran Church, Bridgeport, Connecticut
  - "Life Tree"
- St. Ansgar's Lutheran Church, Cannon Falls, Minnesota
  - "Offspring"
- St. Mark's Episcopal Cathedral, Minneapolis, Minnesota
  - "Christ, Peter, and Paul," (Dedicated 1983), "Resurrection II"
- St. Mary's Greek Orthodox Church, Minneapolis, Minnesota
  - "Palindrome"
- St. Paul's Lutheran Church, Annapolis, Maryland
  - "Paschal Flame," "Baptismal Font"
- St. Paul's Lutheran Church, La Crosse, Wisconsin
  - "Damascus Illumination" (1967)
- Wayzata Community Church, Wayzata, Minnesota
  - "Aegis"
- Westminster Presbyterian Church, Minneapolis, Minnesota
  - "Birth of Freedom," "Life Tree"

=== Hospitals ===
- Abbott Northwestern Hospital, Minneapolis, Minnesota
  - "Wellspring Model"
- Bethesda Lutheran Medical Center, St. Paul, Minnesota
  - "Bethesda Angel" (1968)
- Fairview Ridges Hospital, Burnsville, Minnesota
  - "Offspring"
- Hudson Hospital, Hudson, Wisconsin
  - "3D Life Tree" (1998)
- Immanuel-St.Joseph's Hospital, Mankato, Minnesota
  - "Saint Francis"
- Luther Hospital, Eau Claire, Wisconsin
  - "Family Circle"
- Mayo Clinic, Rochester, Minnesota
  - "Constellation Earth"
- Methodist Hospital, St. Louis Park, Minnesota
  - "Helix"
- Metropolitan Medical Center, Minneapolis, Minnesota
  - "Sprites" (1969)
- Miller-Dwan Medical Center, Duluth, Minnesota
  - "Lofting"
- United Hospital, St. Paul, Minnesota
  - "Apogee" (1982)
- University of Minnesota Children's Hospital, Minneapolis, Minnesota
  - "Adolescence II"

=== Minnesota Locations ===
- Courage Center, Golden Valley, Minnesota
  - "Spirit of Courage"
- EON, Inc., New Ulm, Minnesota
  - "Double Chorus, 9/25"
- Federal Courthouse, Fargo, North Dakota
  - "Portrait Head of Quentin Burdick"
- Federal Reserve Bank, Minneapolis, Minnesota
  - "The Time Being"
- Fergus Falls Library, Fergus Falls, Minnesota
  - "Poet and Muse" (1963)
- First Federal Savings and Loan, Skyway, Minneapolis, Minnesota
  - "The Family"
- Five Flags Plaza, Dubuque, Iowa
  - "Continuum" (Winner of Bicentennial sculpture competition, 1973)
- Institute of Ecumenical Research, Collegeville, Minnesota
  - "Crucifixion" (1970)
- Johnson Heritage Post, Grand Marais, Minnesota
  - "Swimmers"
- Lutheran Social Services, Minneapolis, Minnesota
  - "The Singers"
- Mayo House, Le Sueur, Minnesota
  - "The Mothers"
- Minnesota Landscape Arboretum, Chaska, Minnesota
  - "Winter and Summer Nymphs" (1973)
  - "Mountain Mirage" (1992)
- Minnesota Governor's Residence, St. Paul, Minnesota
  - "MAN NAM" (Vietnam War Memorial, 1970)
- Minnesota State Capitol, St. Paul, Minnesota
  - "Charles A. Lindbergh – The Boy and the Man," "Portrait Head of Edward A. Burdick," "Portrait of Nicholas Coleman"
- Roselawn Cemetery, Roseville, Minnesota
  - "Cube Column Resurrection"
- Saint Paul Academy, St. Paul, Minnesota
  - "Gemini" (1964)
- Wells Fargo Place, St. Paul, Minnesota (formerly Minnesota World Trade Center)
  - "Anthrosphere"
- Wilson Center, Faribault, Minnesota
  - "Adolescence"

=== U.S. Locations ===
- Bethesda Lutheran Home, Watertown, Iowa
  - "Bethesda Pool" (1981)
- Hall of Fame, Nebraska State Capitol, Lincoln, Nebraska
  - "Father Flanagan" bust (1966–67)
- Hyde Park Shopping Center, Chicago, IL
  - "Jacob and the Angel II" (1961)
- La Crosse Public Library, La Crosse, Wisconsin
  - "Ascendance" (1971- Donated by Clarence Smith Family in memory of their parents)
  - "Reflections" (Donated by Alf Gundersen in memory of his wife, Carroll McGarty Gundersen)
- Missouri Botanical Garden, St. Louis, Missouri
  - "Zerogee", "Linnaeus", "Climatron Plaque", "Portrait of Henry Shaw"
- Norskedalen Nature and Heritage Center, Coon Valley, Wisconsin
  - "Zerogee II"
- San Diego International Airport (Lindbergh Field), San Diego, California
  - "Charles A. Lindbergh – The Boy and the Man"

=== International ===
- Assisi, Italy
  - "Saint Francis"
- Caux, Switzerland
  - "Frank Buchman, a bronze bust"
- Hong Kong International School, Hong Kong, China
  - "Adolescence", "Cross Section"
- Indian Academy of Sciences, Bangalore, India
  - "Portrait of Subrahmanyan Chandrasekhar"
- Institute of Astronomy, Cambridge
  - "Bust of Subrahmanyan Chandrasekhar"
- Kansai Gadai University, Osaka, Japan
  - "Constellation Earth", "Familia"
- Le Bourget Airport, Paris, France
  - "Charles A. Lindbergh – The Boy and the Man"
- Nagasaki Peace Park, Nagasaki, Japan
  - "Constellation Earth"
- Uppsala, Sweden
  - "Linnaeus"

== Other sources ==
- Freiert, William K. (1991) Paul T. Granlund: Spirit of bronze, shape of freedom (Primarius Ltd. Publishers) ISBN 9780943535043
