= Gustavus Adolphus College =

Private liberal arts college in St. Peter, Minnesota, US

Coordinates: 44°19′25″N 93°58′18″W

- Former names: Minnesota Elementarskola (1862–1865); St. Ansgar's Academy (1865–1873); Gustavus Adolphus Literary & Theological Institute (1873–1876)
- Motto: E Caelo Nobis Vires
- Motto in English: Strength Comes To Us From Heaven
- Type: Private liberal arts college
- Established: 1862; 164 years ago
- Religious affiliation: Evangelical Lutheran Church in America
- Endowment: $328.7 million (2025)
- President: John Volin
- Provost: Pamela Conners
- Faculty: 170 full-time
- Students: 2,100
- Location: St. Peter, Minnesota, United States
- Campus: 1.38 km^{2} (0.53 sq mi) or 138 ha (340 acres)
- Colors: Black and Gold
- Nickname: Golden Gusties
- Sporting affiliations: NCAA Division III – MIAC
- Mascot: Gus the Lion
- Website: gustavus.edu
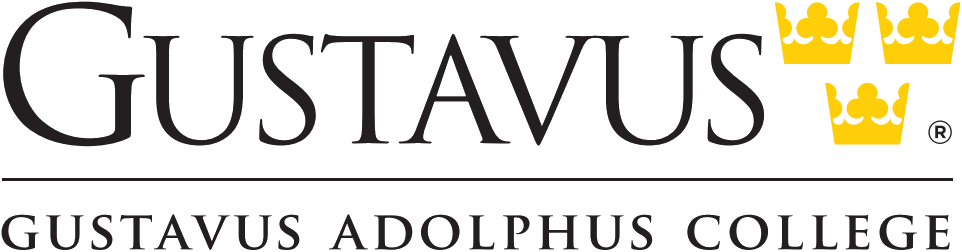

Gustavus Adolphus College (/ɡəsˈteɪvəs/ gəs-TAY-vəs) is a private liberal arts college in St. Peter, Minnesota, United States. It was founded in 1862 by Swedish Americans led by Eric Norelius and is affiliated with the Evangelical Lutheran Church in America. It was named for Gustavus Adolphus, the King of Sweden from 1611 to 1632. Its residential campus includes a 125-acre arboretum.

== History ==
=== Founding ===
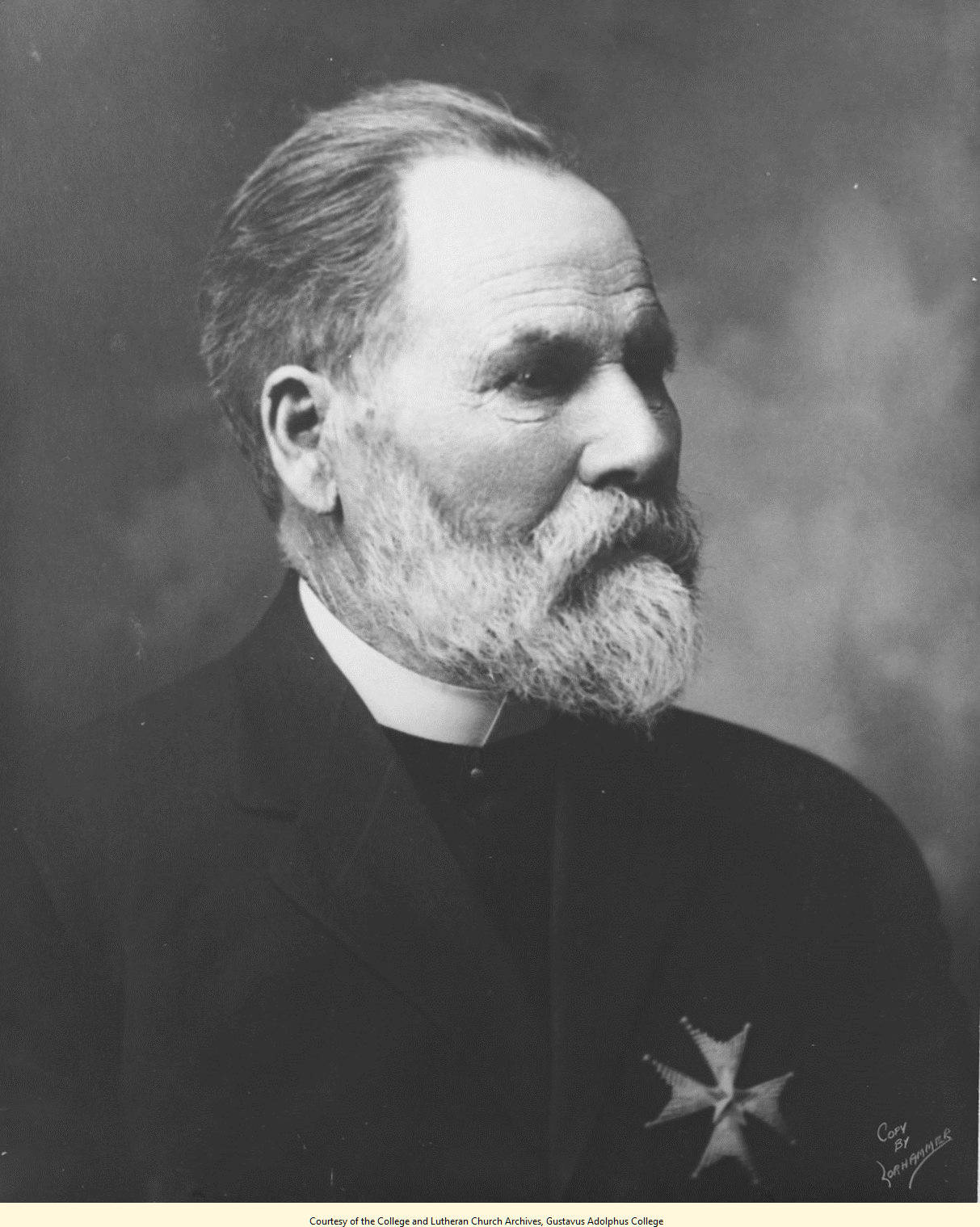
Swedish-American minister Eric Norelius (pictured) led efforts to establish the college in 1862

in 1862, Eric Norelius founded the college's predecessor, a Lutheran parochial school in Red Wing. It offered classes for grade-school children; collegiate courses were not offered until nearly a decade later, but the college uses the earlier date as the year it was founded.

Originally named Minnesota Elementarskola (elementary school in Swedish), it moved the following year to East Union, an unincorporated town in Dahlgren Township. In 1865, on the 1,000th anniversary of the death of St. Ansgar, known as the "Apostle of the North", the institution was renamed and incorporated as St. Ansgar's Academy.

=== Renaming ===
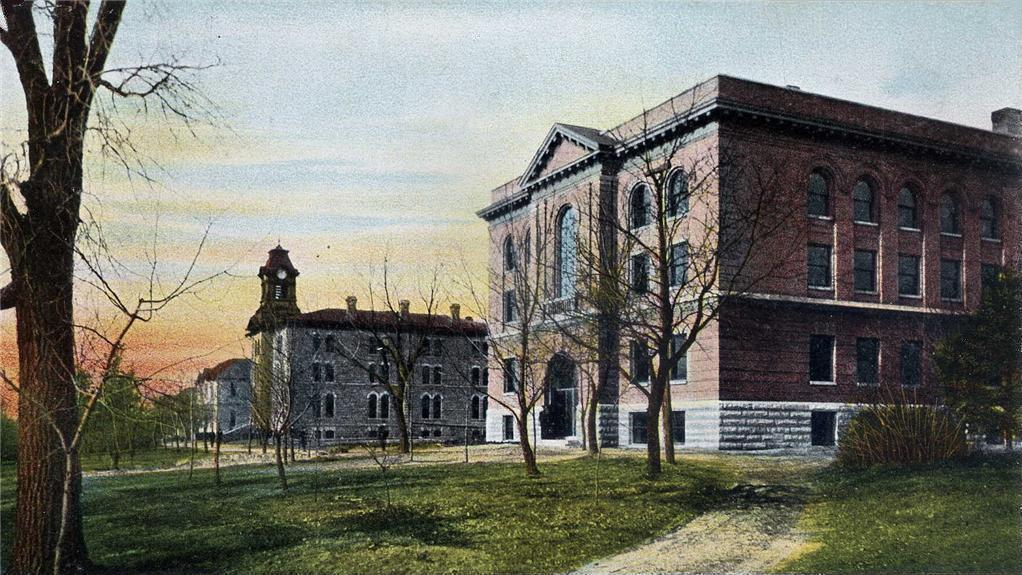
View of the campus c. 1905

In April 1873, the college was to be renamed Gustavus Adolphus Literary & Theological Institute in honor of King Gustavus Adolphus of Sweden once the final location and buildings were secured. A delegation of residents from St. Peter won favor from the founders to relocate there as a result of an economic crisis and the town's offer of $10,000 and donation of acreage for a larger campus.

Courses were initially to start in 1875, but slow progress on constructing the first campus building, Old Main, delayed the opening. On October 16, 1876, Gustavus Adolphus College opened at the location it has today. It is the oldest of several Lutheran colleges founded in Minnesota. It was founded as a college of the Augustana Evangelical Lutheran Church. In 1962, it became affiliated with the Lutheran Church in America when the Augustana Synod merged into that body. The Lutheran Church in America merged in 1988 to create the Evangelical Lutheran Church in America.

=== World War II ===
During World War II, Gustavus Adolphus College was one of 131 colleges and universities nationally that took part in the V-12 Navy College Training Program, which offered students a path to a Navy commission.

=== Founding of the Nobel Conference ===
The annual Nobel Conference was established in the mid-1960s when college officials asked the Nobel Foundation for permission to name the new science building the Alfred Nobel Hall of Science as a memorial to the Swedish inventor Alfred Nobel. Permission was granted, and the facility's dedication ceremony in 1963 included officials from the Nobel Foundation and 26 Nobel Laureates. Following the 1963 Nobel Prize ceremonies in Stockholm, college representatives met with Nobel Foundation officials, asking them to endorse an annual science conference at the college and to allow the use of the Nobel name to establish credibility and high standards. The foundation granted the request at the urging of several prominent Nobel laureates, and the first conference was held at the college in January 1965.

=== Presidents ===
- Eric Norelius, 1862–63, Founder
- Andrew Jackson, principal 1863–73, acting principal 1874–76
- John J. Frodeen, principal 1873–74
- Jonas P. Nyquist, 1876–81
- Matthias Wahlstrom, 1881–1904
- Peter A. Mattson, 1904–11
- Jacob P. Uhler, acting president 1911–1913, 1927
- Oscar J. "O.J." Johnson, 1913–42
- Walter Lunden, 1942–43
- O.A. Winfield, acting president 1943–44
- Edgar M. Carlson, 1944–1968
- Albert Swanson, acting president 1968–69
- Frank Barth, 1969–75
- Edward A. Lindell, 1975–80
- Abner W. Arthur, acting president 1980–81
- John S. Kendall, 1981–91
- Axel D. Steuer, 1991–2002
- Dennis J. Johnson, interim president 2002–03
- James L. Peterson, 2003–08
- Jack Ohle, 2008–14
- Rebecca M. Bergman, 2014–2025
- John C. Volin, 2025–present

== Relationship with Sweden ==
Gustavus Adolphus College has active ties with Sweden. Gustavus students are encouraged to travel and work there. Gustavus has active exchange programs with various universities in Sweden, including Uppsala University, Lund University, and Stockholm University. The college shares a long history and close relationship with the Swedish Royal Court. Alumni have been active in the Swedish government and royal advisory board. The first visit of a Swedish monarch in 1976 to the United States included a visit to Gustavus College. King Carl XVI Gustaf and Queen Silvia visited Gustavus in 2012, and the most recent visit from the Swedish royal family was in 2024.

== Academics ==
The Gustavus Adolphus College curriculum aims to "prepare students for fulfilling lives of leadership and service in society." Students choose from over 70 programs of study with 75 majors in 25 academic departments and three interdisciplinary programs (including 17 honors majors), ranging from physics to religion to Scandinavian studies. Gustavus has been among the top 10 liberal arts institutions nationally as the baccalaureate origin of physics PhDs. The college has 170 faculty, of whom 94% are tenure-track. The student-to-faculty ratio is 11:1, creating an average class size of approximately 15. The college's Writing Across the Curriculum program fosters writing skills in all academic disciplines. Since 1983, the college has had a chapter of the academic honor society Phi Beta Kappa. Its most popular majors, by 2021 graduates, were:

- Psychology (66)
- Biology/Biological Sciences (52)
- Business/Commerce (43)
- Speech Communication and Rhetoric (36)
- Education (31)
- Political Science and Government (30)
- English Language and Literature (29)
- Registered Nursing/Registered Nurse (29)
- Sports, Kinesiology, and Physical Education/Fitness(27)

Gustavus Adolphus College alumni have won Fulbright, Goldwater, Marshall, Rhodes, Truman, National Science Foundation, and NCAA Postgraduate fellowships and scholarships.

In 2015, the college successfully applied for the voluntary Carnegie classification of "community-engaged".

=== Rankings ===
Academic rankings

Liberal arts
- U.S. News & World Report: 67
- Washington Monthly: 18

National
- Forbes: 173
- WSJ/College Pulse: 107

In 2023, U.S. News & World Report ranked Gustavus 67th in the national liberal arts college category. In 2023, Gustavus ranked number 1 in Minnesota in various rankings, including public and private universities. In 2017, U.S. News & World Report ranked it 77th in the national liberal arts college category and 45th in the Best Value Schools category.

The Wall Street Journal/Times Higher Education college rankings placed Gustavus 48th on its list of the top 100 U.S. liberal arts colleges in 2017, third among Minnesota private colleges. Gustavus placed 140th out of 1,061 institutions measured, including public and private colleges.

The 2016 edition of the Washington Monthly college rankings placed Gustavus 58th among liberal arts colleges. The 2024 edition ranked Gustavus 18th among 194 liberal arts colleges in the U.S. based on its contribution to the public good, as measured by social mobility, research, and promoting public service.

In 2016, Gustavus ranked 74th of 705 colleges and universities in Money magazine. The college also ranked 23rd on the magazine's list of the 50 Best Liberal Arts Colleges.

The New York Times ranked Gustavus No. 35 in the United States in their third annual College Access Index of Top Colleges.

=== Admissions ===
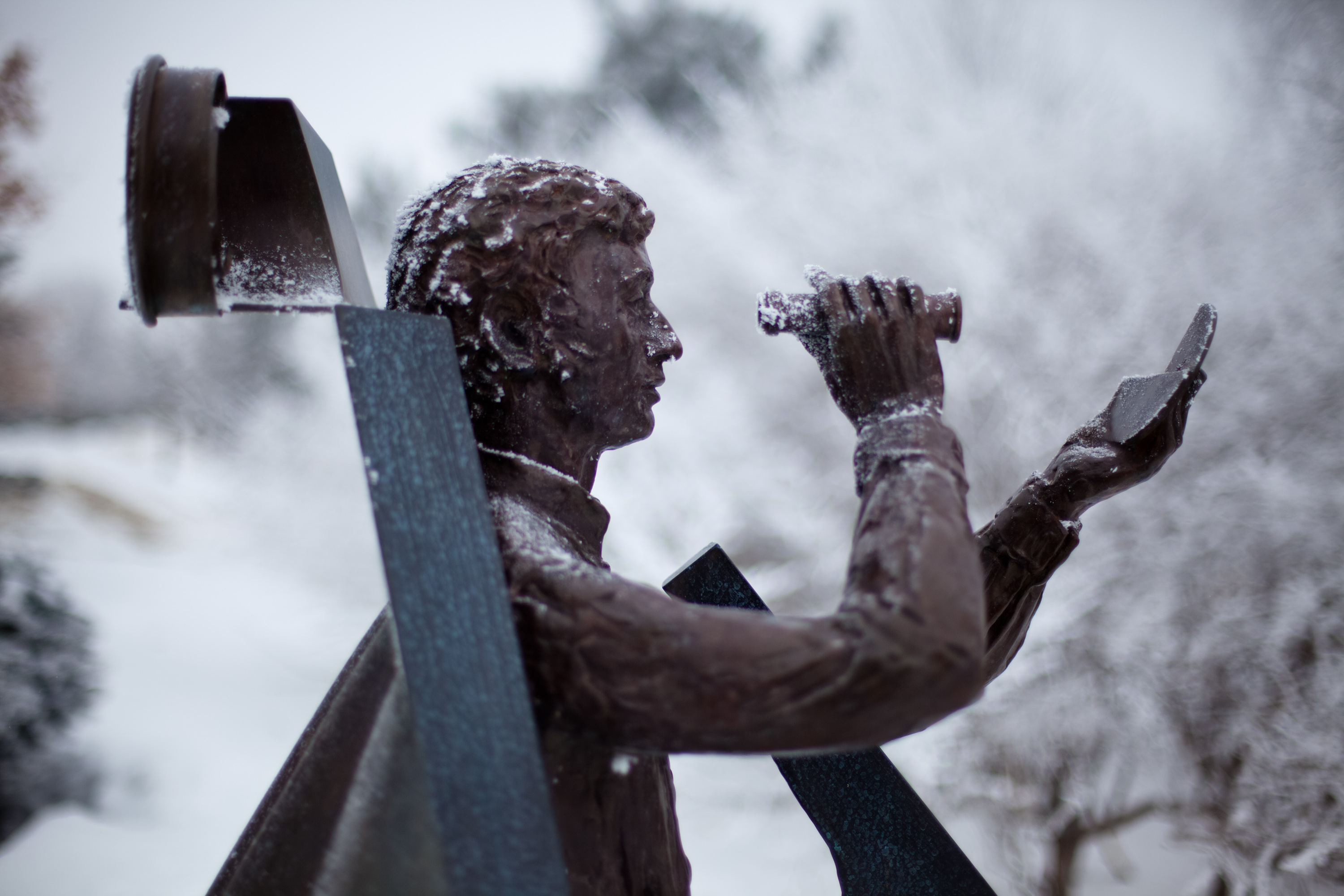
Nicollet is a sculpture by Paul Granlund at Gustavus Adolphus College

In 2016, U.S. News & World Report classified Gustavus Adolphus College as more selective in its National Liberal Arts Ranking. To increase student enrollment, Gustavus offers an expenses-paid "Gustavus Fly-In Program" to US citizens and permanent residents. In 2014, the school had an acceptance rate of 61.1%.

The average ACT score in the middle 50% of enrolled students was between 24 and 30; 78% presented the ACT as part of their applications. The average SAT score in the middle 50% of enrolled students was 590–680 for math and 555–690 for reading; 11% of students submitted the SAT as part of their applications. Gustavus is a test-optional admissions policy college, reaffirming its commitment to holistic admissions. A student's coursework is the most important factor in admission. The average high school GPA for incoming first-year students was 3.67.

In 2017, Gustavus expanded scholarship funding for high-achieving students with a cumulative high school grade point average of 3.9 or above and an average composite ACT score of 32–36.

== Campus ==
The college's first building in St. Peter, affectionately known as Old Main, originally housed the entire college. The campus, known as The Hill, comprises 340 landscaped acres and features science facilities, computer and language labs, and a large dining facility. The campus includes 33 sculptures by the late Minnesota sculptor Paul Granlund, an alumnus of the college who for many years was sculptor-in-residence.

Every tree indigenous to Minnesota is grown in The Arboretum at Gustavus. In 2009, students founded Big Hill Farm, which grows produce for the cafeteria and aims to connect the campus to sustainable agriculture. In the fall of 2011, a new social science center, Beck Hall, opened on campus.

=== Notable buildings ===
- Folke Bernadotte Memorial Library
- Alfred Nobel Hall of Science
- O.J. Johnson Student Union
- Lund Center (Athletic complex featuring Gus Young Court and Don Roberts Ice Arena)
- Hillstrom Museum of Art, notable for its collection of American art from the Ashcan School
- The Arboretum at Gustavus Adolphus College
- "Old Main" – National Register of Historic Places
- C. Charles Jackson Campus Center
- Over 30 Paul Granlund sculptures

==== Old Main ====
- Old Main, Gustavus Adolphus College
- U.S. National Register of Historic Places
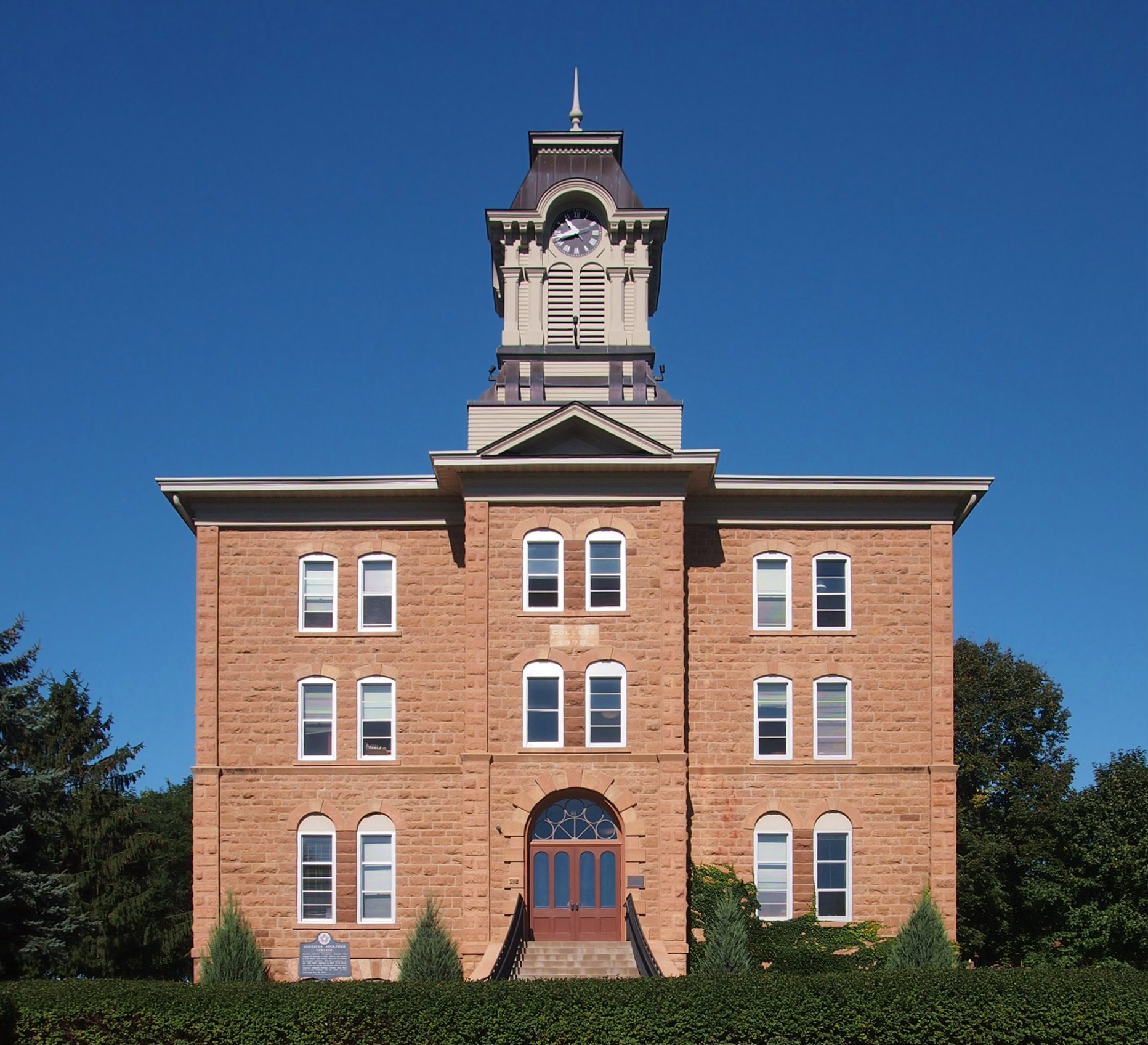
- Old Main
- Location: Gustavus Adolphus College campus, St. Peter, Minnesota
- Area: less than one acre
- Built: 1876
- Built by: O. N. Ostrom
- Architect: Edward P. Bassford and O. N. Ostrom
- Architectural style: Italianate
- NRHP reference No.: 76001065
- Added to NRHP: May 12, 1976

"Old Main" was the first building erected at Gustavus Adolphus College. Its cornerstone was laid on August 12, 1875. Contracted to O. N. Ostrom and constructed from Kasota limestone, the total cost of the building was estimated at $25,000. Old Main was completed in 1876 and dedicated on October 31. Originally called the School Building, as more buildings were erected, it became known as the Main Building and by 1905 as Old Main.

The building was heated by wood stoves and housed the entire college in the institution's first years. It originally contained several classrooms, sleeping quarters for students, faculty, and the president, and a kitchen, dining room, chapel, library, and museum. Until 1920, it was tradition for seniors to gather on the building's roof for a sunrise breakfast the morning of commencement.

On its 50th anniversary in 1926, Old Main underwent a renovation from funds provided by the Minnesota Conference. The 1998 tornado destroyed much of the Gustavus campus and damaged Old Main's bell tower. In 2005, another renovation was completed; the building now houses the Office of the Chaplains and the religion, political science, philosophy, and classics departments.

A famous ghost story surrounding Old Main is the tale of former Chaplain Richard Elvee of two deceased Gustavus security officers, Harley and Barney, occasionally wandering its halls. At the same time, he composed his sermons on Sunday mornings.

==== Christ Chapel ====
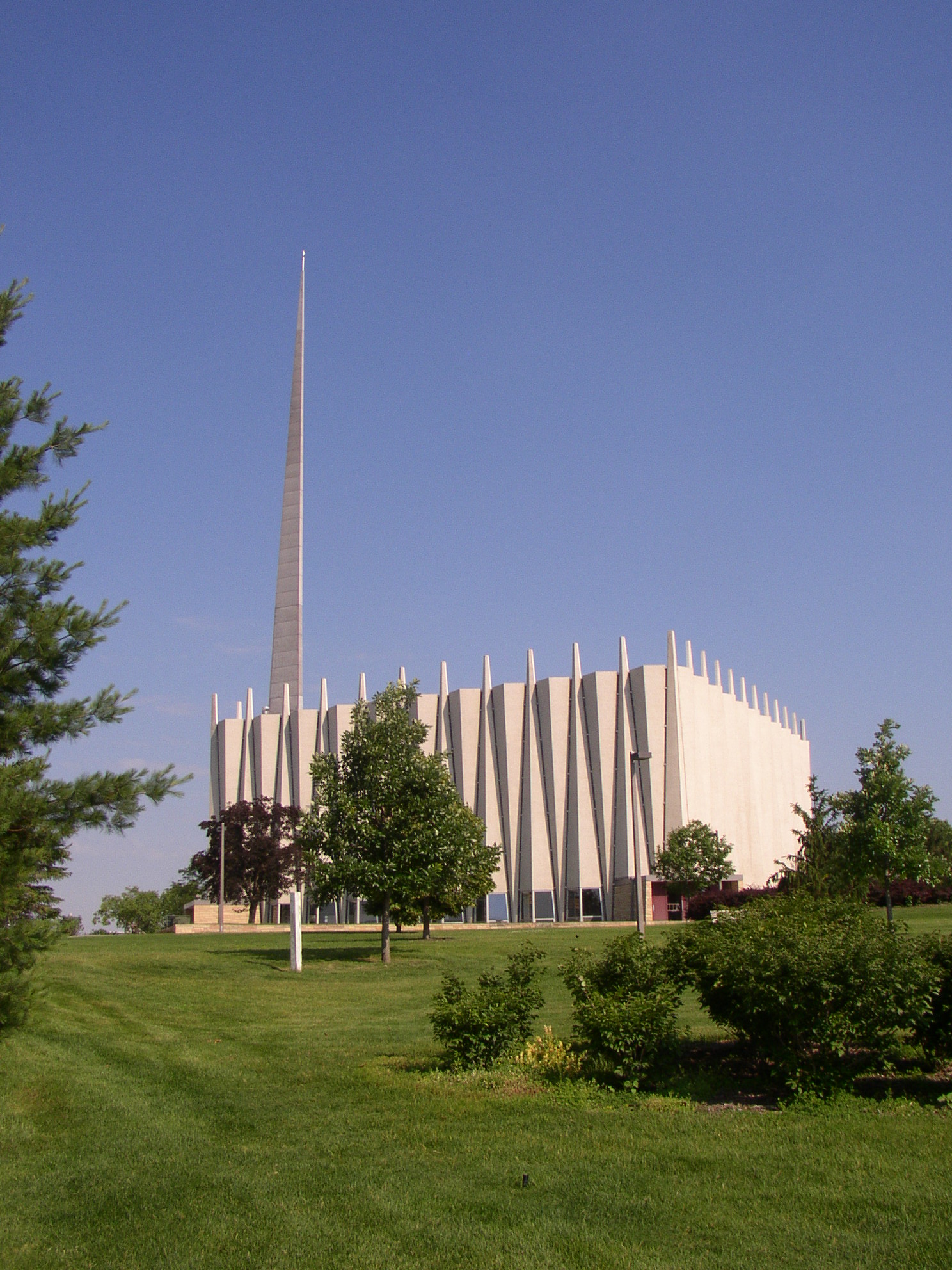
Christ Chapel, built in 1959–1961

Christ Chapel is a church in the center of Gustavus Adolphus College. Constructed from March 2, 1959, to fall 1961, the chapel was dedicated on January 7, 1962. Its construction was made possible by gifts from the congregations of the Lutheran Augustana Synod, a predecessor body of the Evangelical Lutheran Church in America, which is affiliated with the college. Ecumenical services are held each weekday and Sunday during the academic year. There is seating for 1,500 people in the chapel, 1,200 on the main floor, and 300 on the balcony. It is the largest seating area on campus.

The chapel and surrounding grounds are adorned by the sculptures of Paul T. Granlund, the former artist-in-residence at Gustavus Adolphus College.

Christ Chapel's organ was originally built by Hillgreen-Lane when the chapel was built. It has been significantly altered in the last 30 years. These renovations, carried out by David Engen and more recently by the Hendrickson Organ Company of St. Peter, include a new console with solid-state combination and relay, moving several ranks of pipes from an antiphonal position in the basement into the main organ above the balcony, restructuring the Swell mixture, and extensive repairs after the 1998 tornado. It has 55 speaking ranks of pipes, played from a four-manual console, and preparation on the new Great chest for a mounted Kornet V stop. The chapel also houses a small portative organ of three stops on one manual that is used for accompanying and especially for continuo playing in Baroque compositions.

On March 29, 1998, the chapel's spire was toppled by the tornado, which left most of St. Peter, Minnesota in ruins. On March 17, 2008, the cross atop the spire was hung from the chapel's ceiling during a service marking the 10th anniversary of the tornado.

=== Disasters ===
- On January 8, 1970, the Auditorium was completely gutted by a fire, after which it was not rebuilt.
- On March 29, 1998, the college's campus was hit by a mile-wide F3 tornado that broke 80 percent of the windows, leveled nearly 2,000 trees, toppled the chapel's spire, and caused more than $50 million in damages. This is considered one of the most expensive college disasters in history. There was only one death (not a Gustavus student) despite the tornado's widespread path, most likely because most students were away on spring break then. Hundreds of volunteers worked to get the campus back where the students could return after a three-week hiatus. Still, some classes were held in FEMA trailers as some campus buildings were too severely damaged.

== Campus life ==
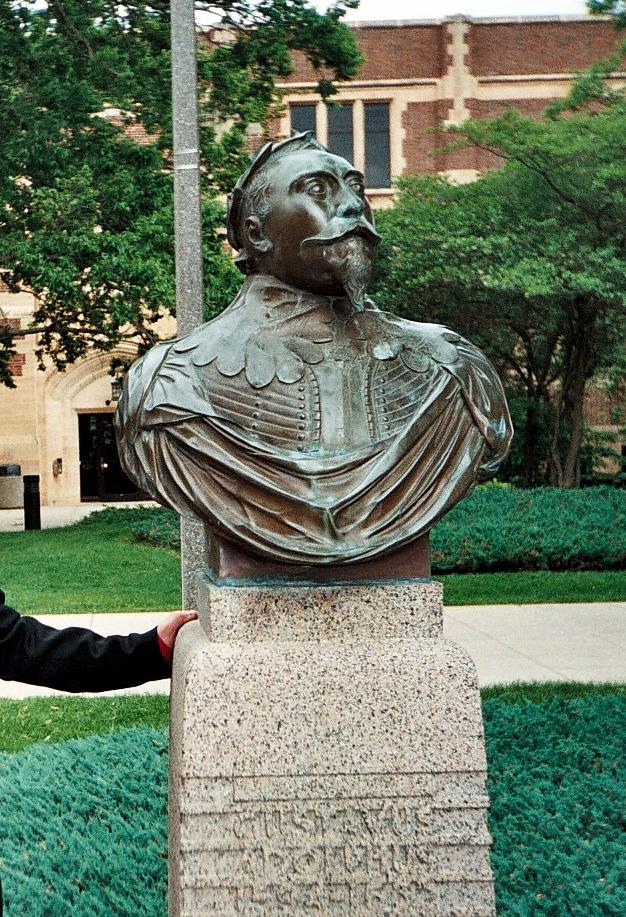
A bust of King Gustav II Adolf of Sweden on campus

Students and alumni of the college are known as Gusties. Most students live in one of 14 campus residence halls or college-owned houses/apartments; a small minority live in theme areas such as the Carlson International Center, CHOICE substance-free housing, and the Swedish House. Students with permission from the college may choose to live off campus, in St. Peter, or elsewhere.

The college has an independently operated dining service, serving the Market Place cafeteria, Courtyard Cafe, and Steamery Cafe.

=== Traditions ===
Gustavus traditions include traying down the hill from Old Main in the winter, random Gustie Rousers, stargazing on top of the academic building Olin, playing tennis in the Bubble, and streaking through The Arboretum at Gustavus. Gustie traditions are mostly exclusively known by Gusties.

=== Student organizations ===
There are more than 120 special interest groups and organizations at Gustavus, and students are very engaged on campus. Active student organizations on campus have included Model United Nations, the National Forensics Debate team, and the Gustavian Society of Filmmakers. Students are encouraged to create clubs or teams and apply to the Student Senate for funding.

Nearly one-fifth of students are active in Greek life. Ten recognized Greek organizations are on campus (some have been suspended and are no longer recognized by the college).

One prominent campus organization is the Campus Activities Board (CAB). CAB's mission statement is to "enrich the campus life experience by encouraging the involvement of all students in engaging and enjoyable entertainment". All students on campus are part of the Campus Activities Board and eligible to participate in activities, serve on committees, and apply for the executive board. There are 11 executive positions, not including the co-presidents and the advisor.

=== Music ===
Many musical ensembles perform throughout the year, including the Gustavus Choir, the Choir of Christ Chapel, the Lucia Singers, the Gustavus Adolphus Symphony Orchestra, the Gustavus Wind Orchestra, and the Gustavus Jazz Ensemble.

In 1942, Percy Grainger, writing in The Musical Quarterly, publicized the "pathbreaking activities"—as an historically appropriate ensemble—of the college's A Capella Choir and chamber orchestra, which toured a series of concerts of music from the 13th to 20th centuries. He praised the "rare value", "practical skill" and "subtle esthetic intuition" of conductor G. Adolph Nelson.

Grainger had an opportunity to observe the work of Nelson, the choir, and the orchestra at close quarters by touring and performing with them that year. Nelson was the college's musical director from 1930 to 1945 and the driving force behind a group that toured the eastern states, winning critical acclaim and financial success. He was particularly concerned about reviving and sharing the chapel's music, including voices and instruments that supported them, including organ, brass, and strings. "Nelson, through his dedication to choral singing and Gustavus Adolphus College, his innate musicality, and his pioneering spirit, gave birth to the ensemble now known as the Gustavus Choir."

=== Theatre and dance ===
Gustavus has an active theatre program. Theater and dance events are a part of Gustie life, with shows every fall and spring and a musical every other year. Students do not need to be a part of the theatre program to audition for plays. The Gustavus Dance Company and the Apprentice Company hold open auditions and perform a fully produced set of work.

=== Art ===
There are two art galleries on campus, the Hillstrom Museum of Art and the Schaefer Art Gallery.

=== Study abroad ===
The college's study abroad program has included internships at BNU-HKBU United International College in Zhuhai, China. Gustavus is also a member of the Intercollegiate Sri Lanka Education (ISLE) consortium, run by Bowdoin College.

== Athletics ==
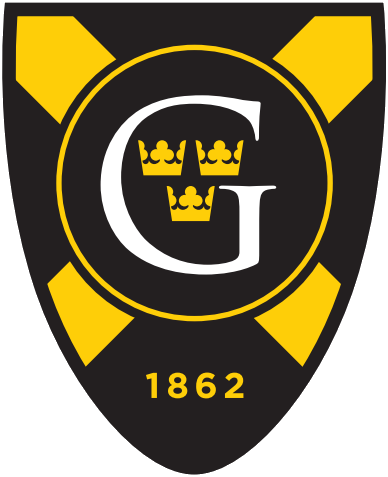
Gustavus Adolphus athletics crest

Gustavus Adolphus athletics teams are nicknamed the Golden Gusties. The college is a founding member of the Minnesota Intercollegiate Athletic Conference (MIAC), established in 1920. Key sports at the college are tennis, swimming & diving, golf, basketball, ice hockey, football, and soccer.

The school's team name is represented by a lion mascot because Gustavus Adolphus was known as "The Lion of the North". Three Gustavus players have been selected in the NFL draft: Russ Buckley in 1940, Kurt Ploeger in 1985, and Ryan Hoag in 2003. In 2014, Gustavus announced it would not continue its men's and women's Nordic skiing team. Gustavus's main rivals in men's athletics are St. John's University, Bethel College, and St. Olaf College.

=== Results ===
- The Gustavus women's softball team placed third in the NCAA Division III national tournament in 2009.
- The Gustavus men's hockey team placed second in the NCAA Division III national tournament in 2009.
- The Gustavus soccer team finished second in the NCAA Division III national tournament in 2005—led in part by three-time all-American Robert "Bobby" Kroog.
- In 2003, the Gustavus men's basketball team finished second in the NCAA Division III national tournament.
- In the middle of the twentieth century, the Gustavus football team was coached by long-time coach/AD Moose Malmquist.
- The women's hockey team has won seven conference titles, including six straight, and has placed in the top four nationally in 2002, 2005, 2006, and 2010. They won the 2023 NCAA Division III National Championship with a 2–1 victory over Amherst College. Five women alumni who played ice hockey at Gustavus have gone on to represent the United States at the 2016 Women's Bandy World Championship, and one represents the Unified Korean team at the 2018 Winter Olympics.
- The Gustavus men's tennis team has made 11 consecutive appearances at the NCAA Division III National Championships. Gustavus Adolphus College hosted the 2013 USTA/ITA Midwest Regional Championships at the Swanson Indoor Tennis Center and Brown Outdoor Courts in St. Peter, Minnesota. In 2003, Steve Wilkinson's squad placed third at the NCAA Division III Championships as well as a first-place finish at the ITA Indoor Championships. Steve Wilkinson retired in 2009 as the winningest coach in college tennis history with a record of 929–279. Gustavus player Eric Butorac closed out his senior season of 2003 by winning both the NCAA Division III singles and doubles championships, with Kevin Whipple as his partner. In 2003, Eric Butorac turned pro. He was a doubles specialist before retiring in 2016 and achieved success as the no. Three-ranked American doubles player for multiple years before retiring.

=== Directors' Cup ===
Gustavus placed 81st in the 2018–19 Learfield Sports Directors' Cup standings. The Directors' Cup is the only all-sports competition in intercollegiate athletics. In Division III, standings are based on national tournament finishes in 18 sports. In 2002–03, Gustavus placed a school-best 6th in the Directors' Cup standings.

== Media ==
Gustavus Adolphus College is home to several publications and broadcasters:

- The Gustavian Weekly, first published in 1920, is the campus newspaper. Its predecessor was the College Breezes. In addition, there were various other names for the student paper from June 1891 into 1902.
- Firethorne is an arts and literary magazine published twice yearly. Students submit short stories, poetry, creative nonfiction, photography, visual art, or other creative content.
- KGSM is a webcast-only radio station operated entirely by students. In 2011, the studio moved to the Beck Academic Hall to improve the quality of its web stream and added a digital audio workstation.
- The newest campus media outlet is GAC TV. Starting with a group of students interested in bringing television broadcasting to campus, GAC TV became an instant success when students started watching the weekly show before free on-campus films.
- The Gustavian yearbook publishes a yearbook for each class and dates back to 1920, with predecessor publications released under different names dating back to 1904.
- TV broadcasts from Gustavus are released over Internet II.
- The Gustavus Quarterly, an alumni magazine, features articles of interest to graduates.
- A satire news source, "The Fourth Crown", publishes comedic articles weekly

== Notable alumni ==
=== Academics ===
- Sydney E. Ahlstrom, Yale University professor of religious history
- Virginia Caine, physician director and chief medical officer and national specialist in infectious diseases recognized for her work with AIDS and sexually transmitted disease
- Paul D. Hanson, Harvard professor, archaeologist, and writer
- Laurie Helgoe, clinical psychologist and educator
- Talmadge E. King, Dean of the UCSF School of Medicine and Vice Chancellor – Medical Affairs
- George Lindbeck, Yale University professor of theology
- Douglas O. Linder, University of Missouri-Kansas City Professor of Law
- James M. McPherson, Pulitzer Prize-winning historian, author of the Civil War monograph Battle Cry of Freedom
- Roy Andrew Miller, linguist, Yale University professor
- Hope A. Olson, University of Wisconsin–Milwaukee professor and library scholar
- Torger Reve, Norwegian economist

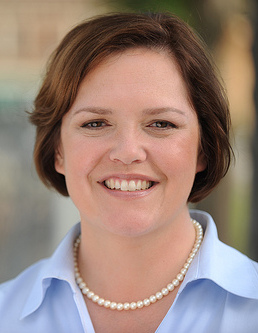
Margaret Anderson Kelliher, former Speaker of the Minnesota House of Representatives

=== Arts and entertainment, journalists, writers ===
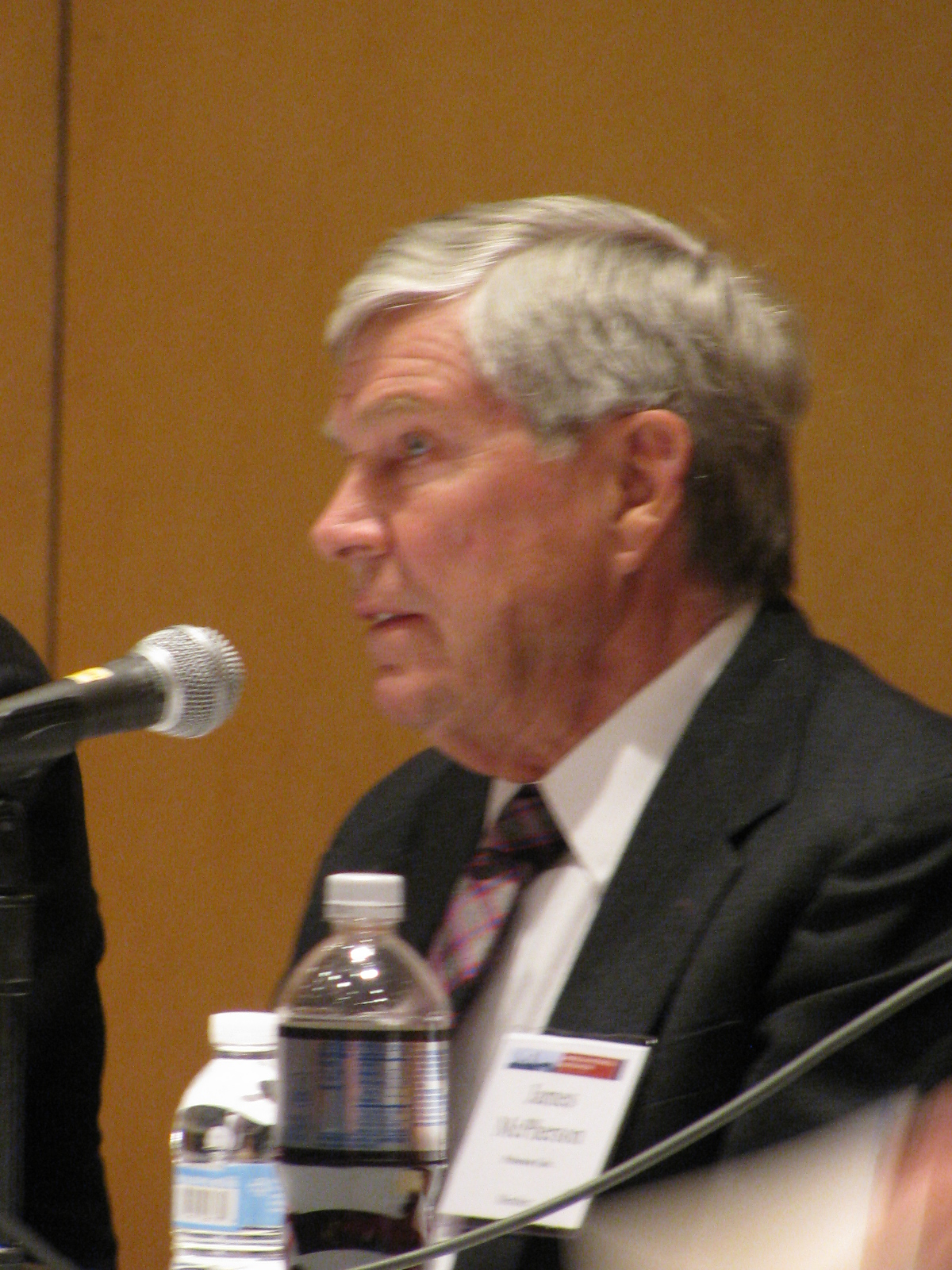
James M. McPherson Pulitzer Prize-winning historian and author

- Kurt Elling, Grammy Award-winning jazz vocalist
- David Esbjornson, theatre director, worked on debut plays by Arthur Miller, Edward Albee, and Tony Kushner (world premiere of Angels in America: Millennium Approaches). Artistic Director of Seattle Repertory Theatre.
- Dennie Gordon, film director
- Paul Granlund, sculptor
- Steve Heitzeg, Emmy Award-winning composer
- Karen Hellekson, author
- Ryan Hoag, 2003 Mr. Irrelevant and former Bachelorette contestant
- Bill Holm, poet and writer
- Kevin Kling, actor and writer
- Peter Krause, American film and television actor
- Nicholas Legeros, sculptor
- Lyz Lenz, 2005, journalist and author
- Allison Rosati, news anchor for WMAQ-TV in Chicago
- Doug Linder, author
- Steve Zahn, actor

=== Business ===
- Linde Lee Jacobs, nurse, health activist, and nonprofit co-founder
- Luther Luedtke, CEO of Education Development Center and former President of California Lutheran University
- Patsy O'Connell Sherman, co-inventor of 3M Scotchgard

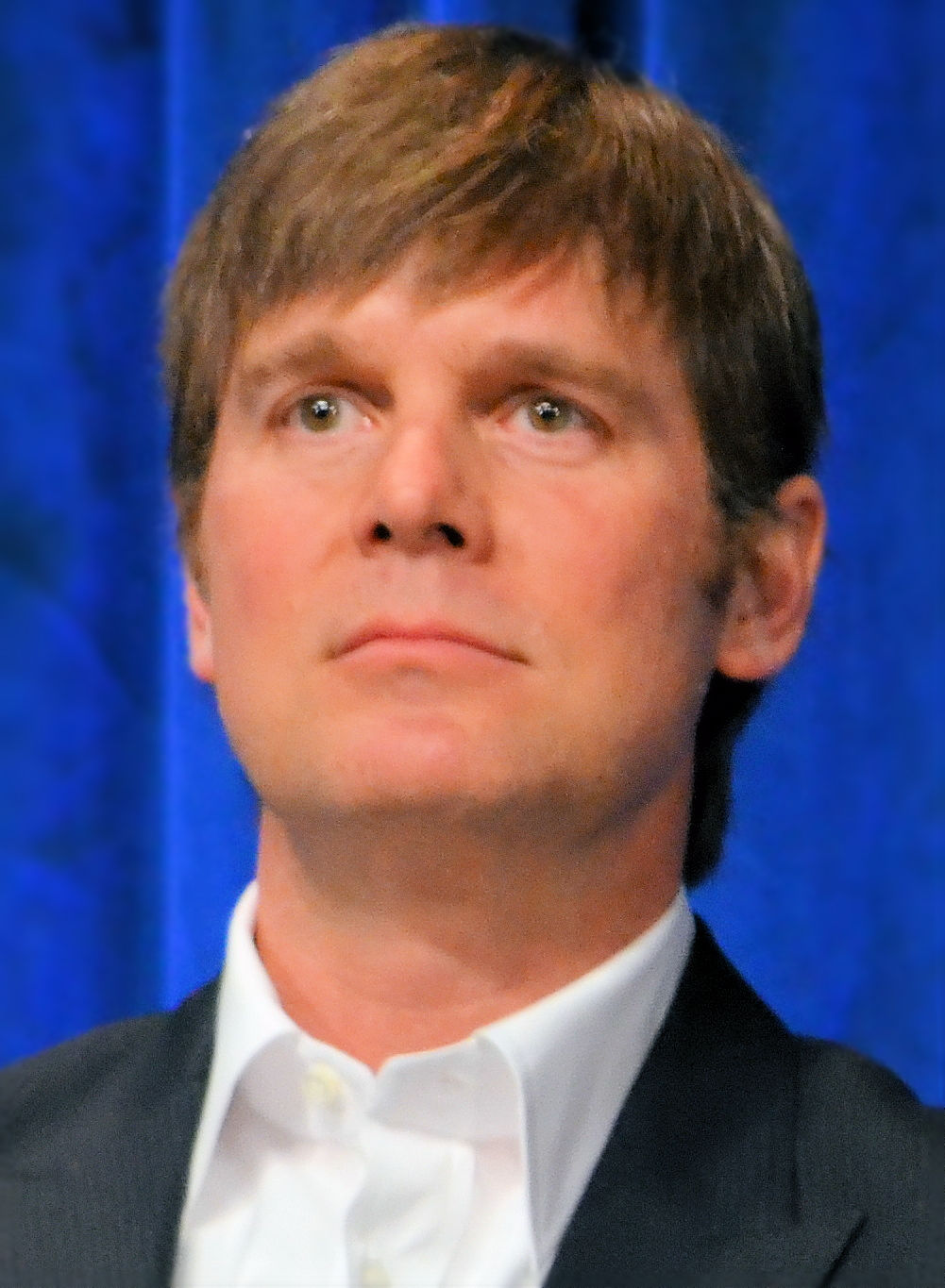
Actor Peter Krause

=== Politics and public service ===
- Theodore C. Almquist, U.S. Air Force Brigadier General
- G. Barry Anderson, Associate Justice of the Minnesota Supreme Court (sworn into office 2004), Class of 1976
- John Anderson, Wisconsin State Senator
- Kristin Bahner, politician in the Minnesota House of Representatives since 2019 and organizer of one of the largest single-day events in Minnesota history
- Mark W. Bennett, Judge, United States District Court for the Northern District of Iowa
- Jack Bergman, Lieutenant General, United States Marine Corps (Ret.), Congressman representing Michigan's 1st congressional district Norman Carlson, Director of Federal Bureau of Prisons (1970–1987), President of the American Correctional Association (ACA), University of Minnesota Professor of Sociology (1987–1998)
- Joanell Dyrstad, Minnesota Lieutenant Governor (1991–1995)
- Adolph Olson Eberhart, Minnesota Governor (1909–1915)
- James D. Ford, former Chaplain of the United States House of Representatives
- David Hann, former Republican leader in the Minnesota Senate
- Margaret Anderson Kelliher, former Speaker of the Minnesota House of Representatives
- Harold LeVander, Minnesota Governor (1967–1971)
- Paul A. Magnuson, Senior Judge, U.S. District Court for the District of Minnesota
- Allen Quist, former Minnesota state representative and candidate for state governor
- Magnus Ranstorp, an internationally renowned expert on terrorism and counter-terrorism.
- Samantha Vang, politician serving in the Minnesota House of Representatives since 2019.
- Gwen Walz, First Lady of Minnesota (since 2019)
- Luther Youngdahl, Governor of Minnesota (1947–1951) and Judge of the United States District Court for the District of Columbia (1951–1978)
- Oscar Youngdahl, U.S. representative

=== Sports ===
- Marissa Brandt, South Korean ice hockey player (known by her legal name in Minnesota, not her birth name, Park Yoon-Jung)
- Eric Butorac, professional tennis player
- Wendell Butcher, American football player
- Kurt Ploeger, professional football player
- Earl Witte, professional football player

== Notable faculty ==
- Marcia Bunge, theologian and professor of Lutheran studies, researching children and childhood in religion and ethics
- Peg O'Connor, professor and chair of the Department of Philosophy
- Whitey Skoog, men's basketball coach from 1957 to 1981, men's golf coach from 1973 to 1996
- Joyce Sutphen, professor emerita of English, Minnesota's Poet Laureate from 2011 to 2021
