= List of the oldest buildings in Idaho =

This article attempts to list the oldest extant buildings surviving in the state of Idaho in the United States of America, including the oldest houses and any surviving structures. Some dates may be approximate and based upon dendochronology, architectural studies, and historical records. Idaho became a territory in 1863, though few structures survive from before this time. All entries should include a citation. To be on this list the building should either have been built before 1890, or be the oldest building of its kind in Idaho.

Building	Image	Location	Completed	Use	Notes
Cataldo Mission		Cataldo	1853	Jesuit Mission	Started construction in 1850, built with help from Native Americans using wattle and daub method, using no nails.
Pierce Courthouse		Pierce	1862	Courthouse	Oldest public building in Idaho, used until 1885 when county seat moved to Murray.
John A. O'Farrell Cabin		Boise	1863	House	Considered first family home in Boise.
Fort Boise Officers Quarters		Boise	1864	Officers Quarters	Oldest surviving building of Fort Boise.
Fort Boise Surgeons Quarters		Boise	1864	Officers Quarters	Includes an 1880 brick add-on.
Cyrus Jacobs House		Boise	1864	House	Oldest surviving brick building in Boise
Rock Creek Store		Rock Creek	1865	Store	Built for the Rock Creek stage stop, which was the largest stage stop between Fort Hall and Fort Boise.
Christ Chapel		Boise	1866	Church	Moved to the campus of Boise State University, now used as a chapel for wedding services.
Thomas E. Logan House		Boise	c. 1868	House	Now located at the Idaho History Museum
First Presbyterian Church		Kamiah	1871	Church	Built on land belonging to Nez Perce tribe.
Assay Office		Boise	1871	Assay Office	Built because of a large demand for an Assay Office in Idaho, as mining was a large part of Idaho's industry.
Lorenzo Hill Hatch House		Franklin	1872	House	Built-in Franklin, Idaho's oldest incorporated town.
St. Joseph's Mission		Slickpoo	1874	Mission	Closed in 1958 but well preserved with interpretive signs.
Joseph Bown House		Boise	1879	House	
Fort Sherman Chapel		Coeur d'Alene	1880	Church	Oldest building in the city of Coeur d'Alene
W. H. Watt Building		Hailey	1882	Storefront	Today is a jewelry store.
Blaine County Courthouse		Hailey	1883	Courthouse	Originally made for Alturas County.
Fort Lapwai Officers Quarters		Lapwai	1883	Officers Quarters	Last surviving building from Fort Lapwai, used during the Nez Perce War
Cordelia Lutheran Church		Lenville	1883	Church	Oldest Lutheran building in the state of Idaho.
Fort Sherman Powder Magazine		Coeur d'Alene	1885	Powder Magazine	One of only three remaining structures from Fort Sherman.

== See also ==
- List of the oldest buildings in the United States
