= Parisian café =

Type of café found mainly in Paris

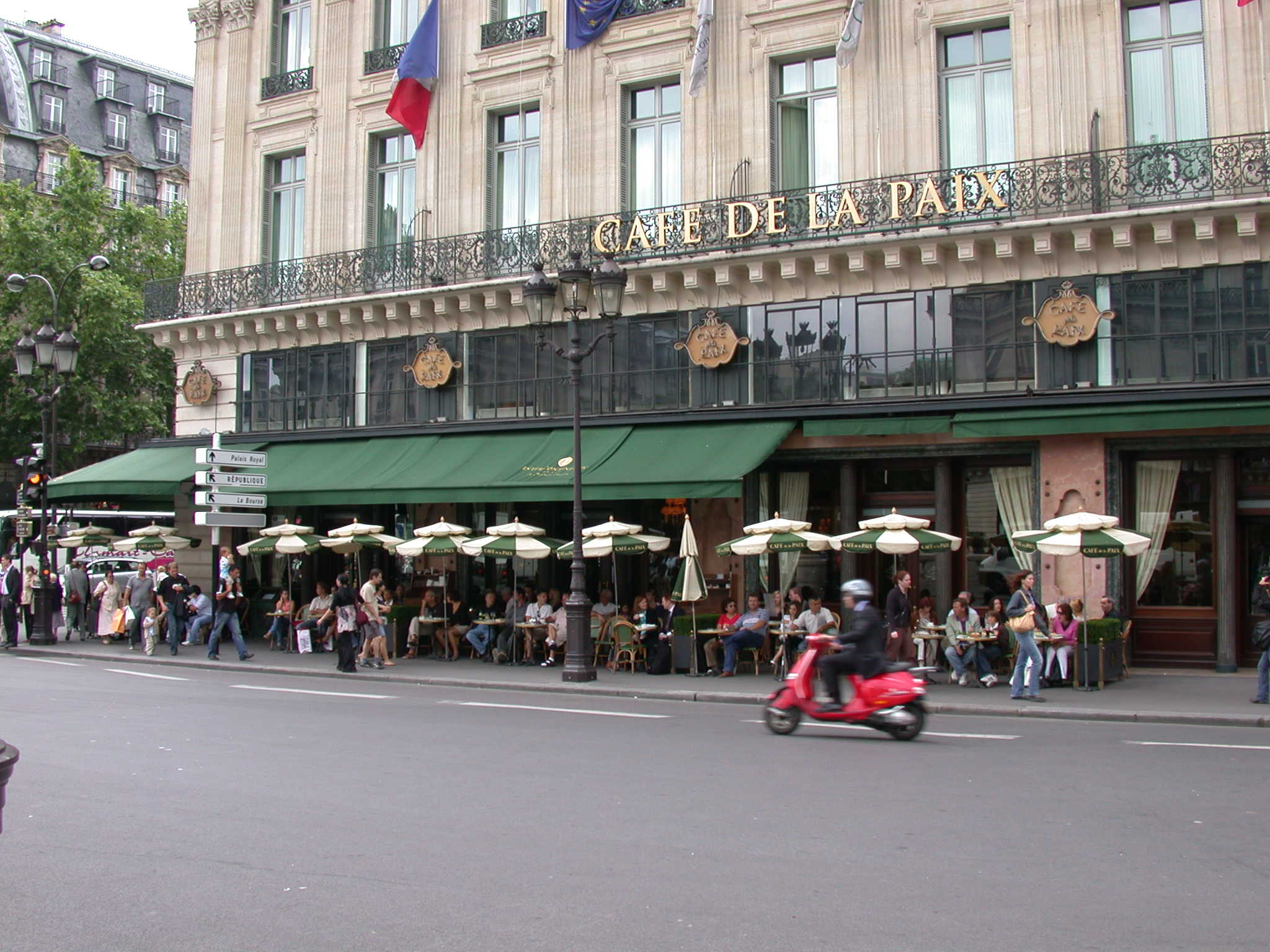
The Café de la Paix, at the Boulevard des Capucines

A Parisian café is a type of café found mainly in Paris, where in addition to serving food and drink it can serve as a meeting place, neighborhood hub, and place to relax in a congenial atmosphere.

Typical Parisian cafés are not mere coffeehouses, but generally include a complete kitchen offering a restaurant menu with meals for any time of the day. Many also feature both wine and a full bar. Drinks customarily served include the grand crème (large cup of white coffee), wine by the glass, beer (un demi, half a pint, or une pression, a glass of draught beer), un pastis (made with aniseed flavour spirit, usually named by a brand like Ricard, 51, Pernod), and un espresso, or un express (a small cup of black coffee). In many cases, the café sometimes doubles as a bureau de tabac that sells a wide variety of merchandise, including metro tickets and prepaid phone cards.

Some of the most recognizable Paris cafés include Café de la Paix, Les Deux Magots, Café de Flore, Café de la Rotonde, La Coupole, Fouquet's, Le Deauville, as well as a new wave represented by Café Beaubourg and Drugstore Publicis. The oldest still in operation is the Café Procope, which opened in 1686.

== History ==
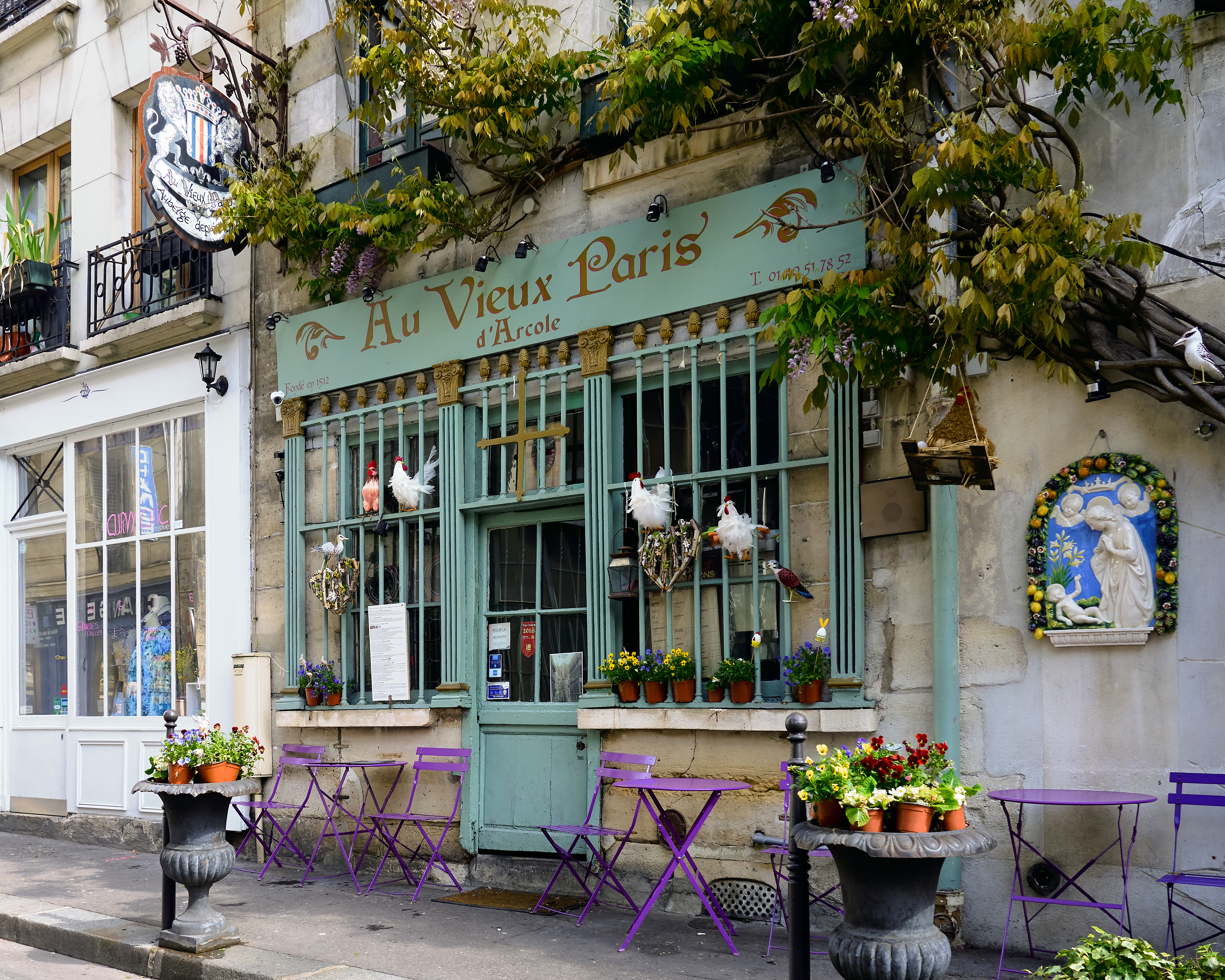
Ornate exterior of the Au Vieux Paris d'Arcole, a Parisian café dating from 1512

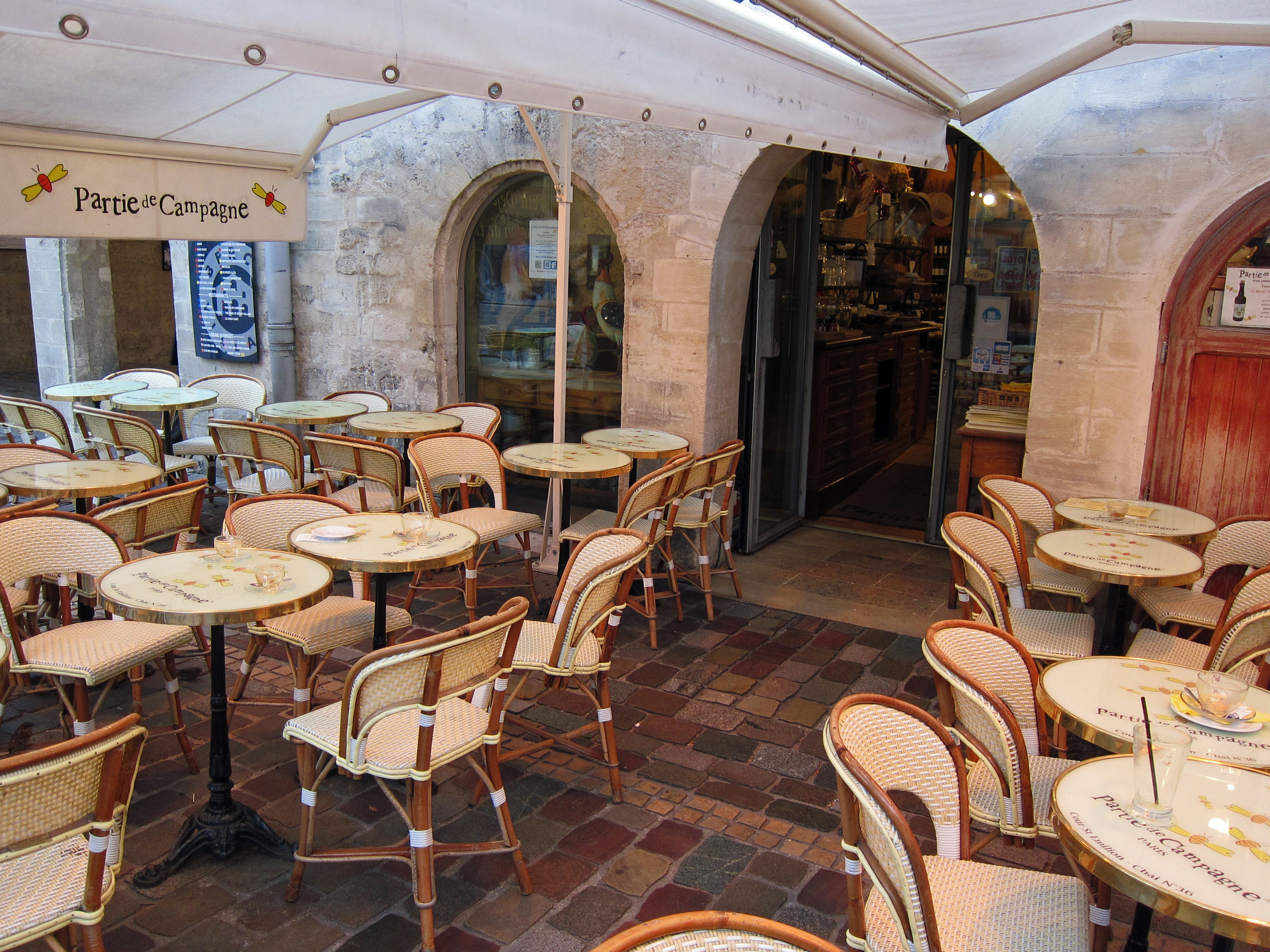
The terrace of the "Partie de Campagne" tea room at the Saint-Émilion courtyard in Bercy Village

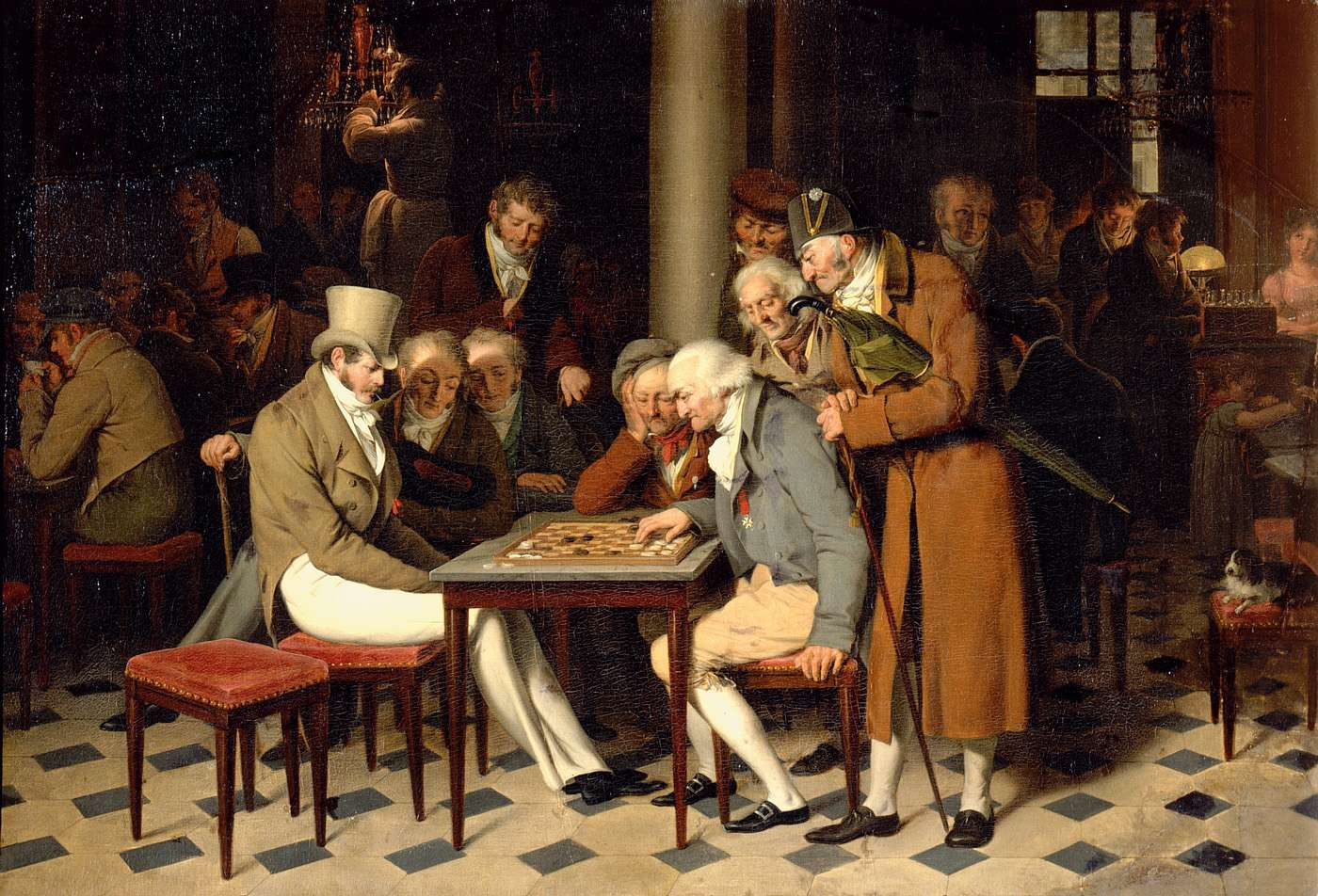
Men playing checkers at the Café Lamblin in the Palais-Royal, by Boilly (before 1808)

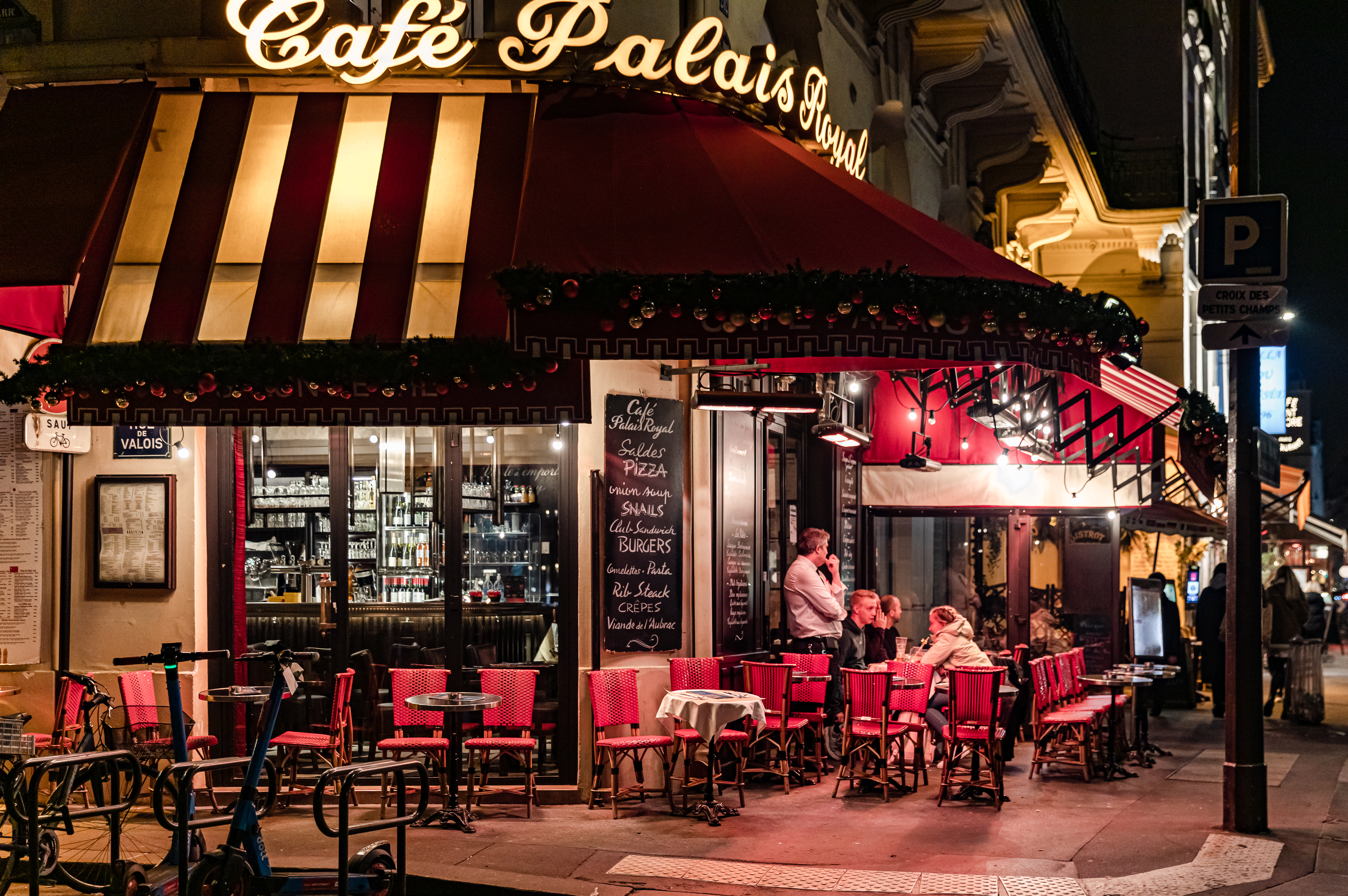
Café Palais Royal (2021)

Coffee was introduced to Paris in 1644 by Pasqua Rosée, who opened the first café in Paris on Place Saint-Germain, but the concept did not become successful until the opening of Café Procope in about 1689 in rue des Fossés-Saint-Germain, close to the Comédie-Française. The café served coffee, tea, chocolate, liqueurs, ice cream, and confiture in a luxurious setting. The Café Procope was frequented by Voltaire (when he was not in exile), Jean-Jacques Rousseau, Diderot and D’Alembert. Cafés became important centers for exchanging news, rumors and ideas and were often more reliable than newspapers. In 1723 there were about 323 cafés in Paris; by 1790, there were more than 1,800. They were places for meeting friends and for literary and political discussion. Hurtaut and Magny wrote in their ‘’Dictionnaire de Paris’’ in 1779: "One gets the news there, either by conversation or by reading the newspapers. You don’t have to encounter anyone with bad morals, no loud persons, no soldiers, no domestics, no one who could trouble the tranquility of society." Women rarely entered cafés, but women of the nobility sometimes stopped their carriages outside and were served inside the carriage with cups on silver platters. During the French Revolution, the cafés turned into centers of furious political discussion and activity, often led by members of the Revolutionary clubs. Following the Revolution and the Napoleonic Wars, billiard rooms were added to some famous 18th-century cafés in Paris and other cities.

According to Louis-Sébastien Mercier, there were some six or seven hundred cafés in Paris before the Revolution; they were "the ordinary refuge of the idler and the shelter of the indigent". He says that in certain cafés, an academy could be found, where authors and plays were criticised. Mercier describes the serving wenches in the cafés as great flirts; they need to be virtuous because men constantly surround them.

During the Restoration period, the café was an important social institution, not as a place to eat but as an establishment to meet friends, drink coffee, read the newspapers, play checkers, and discuss politics. In the early 19th century, cafés diversified; some, called cafés-chantants, had singing; others offered concerts and dancing. During the Restoration, many of the cafés began serving ice cream.

Mariana Starke, the author of travellers' guides to Europe in the early 19th century, wrote of the cafés of Paris: "Ladies are also in the habit of frequenting the Cafés where tea, coffee, chocolate, etc. are served in the morning; and coffee, liqueurs, beer, lemonade, and ices in the evening. Most Cafés furnish what is called a déjeuner froid à la fourchette ... Parisians ... frequently take these meat breakfasts."

"There is nothing about the Paris streets which more definitely strikes the British or American visitor than the café life on the pavements ... The Paris café remains in their minds as the typical café--something so foreign that there is no equivalent for its name in the English language. The old English coffee-house was not a café in the modern sense, and it has vanished now. So is also vanishing the Paris café in its most characteristic form. There was a time when the best thought of France, in the arts and in politics, was to be found round such and such tables in such and such a café. The Frenchman's café was his club... The cafés of Paris are no longer part of her intellectual life, but they are certainly the chief feature of her streets; on pavements hardly wide enough for a honeymoon couple to walk on, a flimsy chair and an oak-grained tin table will defend against all-comers the right of every good Frenchman to enjoy upon the very streets of the loved city his Byrrh--and Frankincense."--George and H. Pearl Adam, A Book about Paris. London: Jonathan Cape, 1927.

== See also ==
- Bistro, a form of smaller, informal French restaurant
- Brasserie, a French restaurant which may brew its own beer
- Sidewalk cafe
- Viennese coffee house, cafés and their culture in Vienna
- Cafés and restaurants in Paris under Napoleon
