= John A. O'Farrell =

Irish-American adventurer, miner and pioneer

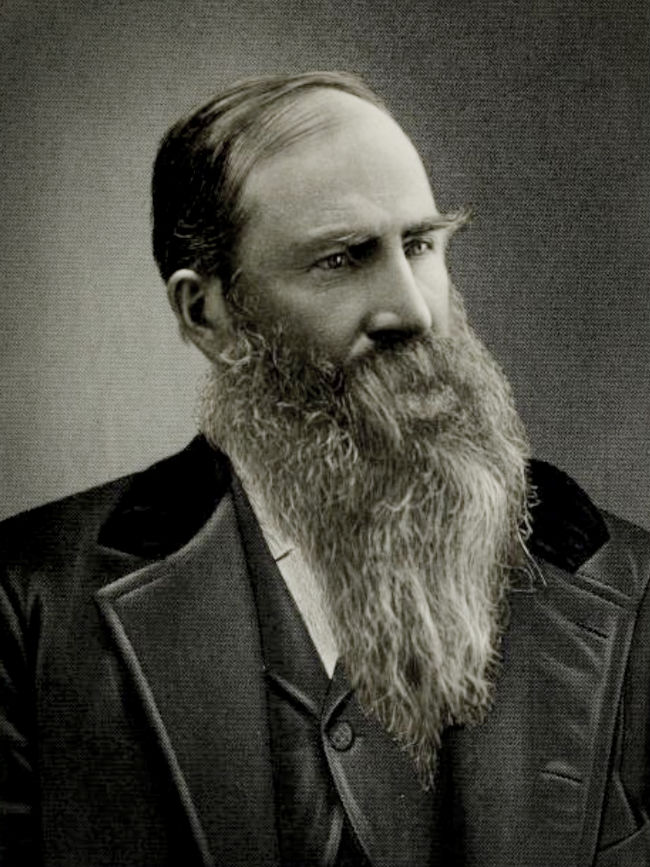
- John O'Farrell later in life
- Born: February 13, 1823; County Tyrone, Ireland
- Died: October 29, 1900 (aged 77); Boise, Idaho
- Occupations: Shipsmith, miner
- Known for: John A. O'Farrell Cabin; John A. O'Farrell House

John A. O'Farrell (February 23, 1823 – October 29, 1900) was an Irish American adventurer, miner, and pioneer and was among the first residents of Boise, Idaho.

== Early life and education ==
John Andrew O'Farrell was born February 13, 1823, in County Tyrone, Ireland, the son of Andrew and Ellen (O'Flaherty) O'Farrell. He attended National school until age 13 then transferred to a naval school in County Cork.

At age 15, O'Farrell crewed aboard a steamship of the Oriental Line bound for Calcutta, India. At 16 he served 13 months aboard the Australian ship Nebob. Later he worked as a shipsmith for Captain William Coppin in Derryy, and he crewed aboard a ship bound for the United States. In 1843 O'Farrell arrived in New York City, USA. He worked as a shipsmith at the Philadelphia Naval Shipyard, and when the Mexican–American War began, he sailed for California and was assigned to the Lexington.

== California Gold Rush ==
While serving aboard the Lexington, O'Farrell met John Sutter at the settlement of Yerba Buena. He became a goldminer at Sutter's Mill, earning between $30 and $50 per day. When California became a state in 1850, O'Farrell automatically became a citizen of the United States.

== Crimean War ==
O'Farrell returned to England in 1853 and enlisted in the British Navy during the Crimean War, serving aboard the Agamemnon, flagship of Admiral Lyons. He was wounded during the attack on Sevastopol and later received the Crimea Medal.

Returning to California in 1856, O'Farrell soon joined the Pike's Peak Gold Rush and journeyed to Colorado in 1857, striking gold in 1860 at California Gulch.

== Marriage and family ==
O'Farrell married Mary Ann Chapman on October 16, 1861, in Louisville, Kentucky. Leaving his wife in Philadelphia, he soon returned to mining in the western states and territories, and in 1863 he settled in Boise City, Idaho, becoming one of the town's original residents. He constructed a cabin from cottonwood trees near the entrance to the newly rebuilt Fort Boise, on the road to Idaho City. O'Farrell returned to Philadelphia then led a train of 14 wagons and members of his wife's family back to Boise City. The O'Farrells occupied the cabin until 1872, starting a family that included seven of their own children (three died in infancy) and seven adopted children. One of the adopted children, Rosa, was the niece of Chief Winnemucca. She lived with the O'Farrell's for 24 years until her death. The John A. O'Farrell Cabin was listed with the National Register of Historic Places (NRHP) on December 3, 1999.

The O'Farrells were active in the Catholic church, and for years their cabin hosted church services. In 1869 O'Farrell donated land for the construction of St. Patrick's Church in Boise City, but the church burned 18 days after construction.

In 1869, citing the Town Site Act of 1867, the United States General Land Office denied O'Farrell's claim to 442 acres that included the original plat of Boise City. The Idaho Statesman wrote of the case, "The evidence in this case shows that 500 buildings have been erected for dwellings, stores, etc.; that the population of the city is now 2000, and the improvements are valued at $1000."

The O'Farrells relocated to Park City, Utah, in the pursuit of mining 1871–1878, but they later returned to Boise City. In 1892 they built the John A. O'Farrell House. The house was listed with the NRHP on September 4, 1979.

In the Brumbach Addition in Boise's North End, O'Farrell Street is named for John O'Farrell.

== See also ==
- List of ocean liners
- Siege of Sevastopol (1854–55)
- Timeline of Boise, Idaho
