= Peter Carlson =

Swedish missionary (1822–1909)

Peter Carlson (December 7, 1822 – August 13, 1909) was a Swedish-American Lutheran Minister who helped found the Augustana Evangelical Lutheran Synod and served as president of the Minnesota Conference for six years.

== Biography ==
Carlson was born on December 7, 1822, at Hjortsberga, in the parish of Alvesta, in Kronoberg, Sweden. He was the son of to Carl Andersson and Anna Isaksdotter of Småland. His life in Sweden was marked by poverty and lack of education. At age 15, he became a carpenter to support his parents and four younger siblings. Peter married Christina (Stina Kajsa) Andersdotter when he was 25. They moved to the parish of Aneboda near the city of Växjö, Sweden. In May 1854, at age 32, he immigrated to the United States with his family and settled in St. Charles, Illinois before moving to Geneva. He was mentored by Pastor Erland Carlsson and began his ministry that November. He later met Dr. Eric Norelius at a synod meeting in Waverly, IL in 1855 and became close friends with Rev. Andrew Jackson.

In November 1857, he moved to Carver County, Minnesota, where he organized both East Union Lutheran Church and West Union Lutheran Church. Carlson was ordained in Chicago on September 13, 1859, and helped found the Augustana Evangelical Lutheran Synod on June 5, 1860.

Carlson left the Carver congregation in August 1879 to serve as a missionary in the Pacific Northwest. That December he organized Immanuel Swedish Evangelical Lutheran Church in Portland, Oregon, the first Augustana Synod church west of the Rocky Mountains. The following year he moved to Idaho with his family, where he established the Cordelia Swedish Lutheran Church, the first Lutheran church in the state.

Carlson returned to work in Portland from 1882 to 1883 and organized First Lutheran Church of Tacoma, his fifth church in the West. Following his work on the West Coast, he returned to Moscow, Idaho, where he served the Cordelia and Zion congregations from 1886 to 1892 while continuing his missionary work. Over his lifetime he established 18 Lutheran churches throughout the Midwest and West.

Peter Carlson and his wife, Christina (1825-1893), had three children: John, Andrew, and Anna. He died on August 13, 1909, from a stroke in Omaha, Nebraska. Both Peter and Christina Carlson were buried at the Moscow Cemetery in Latah County, Idaho.

== Church Organization ==
- East Union Lutheran Church - Carver, Minnesota (1858)
- West Union Lutheran Church - Carver, Minnesota (1858)
- Swedish Evangelical Lutheran Götaholm Congregation (now Trinity Lutheran Church) - Watertown, Minnesota (1858)
- Immanuel Swedish Evangelical Lutheran Church - Portland, Oregon (1879)
- First Swedish Evangelical Lutheran Church of Astoria - Astoria, Oregon (1880)
- Cordelia Swedish Lutheran Church - Lenville, Idaho (1880)
- Bethsaida Church - LaConner, Washington (1881)
- First Lutheran Church of Tacoma - Tacoma, Washington (1882)
- Coos Bay Church - Oregon (1884)
- Zion Swedish Evangelical Church - Moscow, Idaho (1884)
- Gethsemane Lutheran Church - Seattle, Washington (1885)
- Bethlehem Swedish Evangelical Lutheran Church – Nehalim Valley, Oregon (1886)
- Salem Lutheran Church – Spokane, Washington (1888)
- First Swedish Evangelical Lutheran Church – Bellingham, Washington (1901)

== Other sources ==
- Norling, Reuben Emanuel (1939) Peter Carlson, pioneer pastor, of the Evangelical Lutheran Augustana Synod of North America (University of Idaho)
