= C. E. Humphry =

C.E. Humphry (1843–1925), who often worked under the pseudonym "Madge", was a well-known journalist in Victorian-era England who wrote for and about issues relevant to women of the time. She wrote, edited and published many works throughout her career and is perhaps best known for originating what was known as the "Lady's Letter"-style column she wrote for the publication Truth, read throughout the British Empire. She was one of the first woman journalists in England.

The subject matter about which she wrote could be compared to that of Emily Post or Ann Landers.

== Life ==
=== Background ===
Charlotte Eliza Humphry, née Graham, was born at Omagh, Co. Tyrone, on 12 July 1843, the daughter of Rev. James Graham and his wife Eliza (formerly Grayson, nee Raleigh). Her father was the Senior Curate of St Columb's Cathedral and Surrogate of the Diocese of Londonderry; he published a series of essays in opposition to Puseyite tractarianism and died when Charlotte was less than two years old. Her grandfather, Rev. John Graham (1774-1844), was a prominent figure in the Orange Order and historian of the Williamite War in Ireland. Her sister Frances married John Wylkins Coppin, brother of Louisa Coppin.

=== Education and early career ===
Charlotte was educated in Dublin. In adulthood she moved to London; by 1871 she was teaching English in a boarding school for girls near Paddington. She then had a secretarial role on the Drawing Room Gazette, before in 1874 becoming editor of Sylvia's Journal. Soon Henry Du Pré Labouchère offered her the opportunity to pen a gossip column for women in Truth.

=== Marriage and family life ===
She married Joseph Albert Humphry on 5 March 1881. She afterwards lived in London where her daughter, Helen Pearl, who also became a journalist, was born in the following year.

=== Death ===
She died at Waverley Place, St John's Wood, on 2 April 1925.

== Journalistic career ==
Mrs. Humphry, a.k.a. Madge, began writing the "Girl's Gossip" column in Truth around 1882 and continued it throughout her career. Mrs. Humphry was one of the first female journalists to write a regular column devoted to women's issues. At the beginning of her career, there were very limited spaces devoted to women in newspapers and magazines. However, by the 1890s the idea of women making a career in journalism was considerably more acceptable than it had been thirty years previously. By then, women writers had become more visible in mainstream periodicals and specialist women's magazines. As Humphry herself commented in an interview for Women’s Life:

The scope of women's work in the journalistic world is much greater now. When I first became a journalist only a few papers published ladies' letters, and these dealt principally with domestic servants, the management of babies, and similar subjects. Now women go in for golf, bicycling, and other games; in fact, the athletic girl is a new development, and as woman's world is widened, so is the field for women writers.

Others would later mimic her style. Humphry's columns regularly featured advice on domestic management, etiquette and manners, and getting on in English and foreign society. The articles also frequently contained recipes, which were "prepared by the very best cooks in England and on the Continent". By today's standards, these articles might be considered without focus since they often jumped from topic to topic, and would likely be found in the editorial section of a contemporary newspaper. A sample of her writing from 1887 in Truth can be found here.

She went on to write all the dress and fashion articles for the Daily News and another "Lady's Letters" column for the Globe, two popular daily newspapers at the time. She was also the editor of Sylvia's Home Journal. It is likely that she sustained her work for most, if not all, of these periodicals and newspapers in addition to publishing several of her own books, including:

- The Book of the Home: A Comprehensive Guide on All Matters Pertaining to the Household, 1909, 6 volumes, Editor
- How to be Pretty Though Plain, 1899
- A word to women, 1898
- The Century Invalid Cookery Books, 1989
- Manners for men, 1897
- Manners for women, 1897

== Comprehensive bibliography ==
- Points Worth Noting for Women, 1918
- The Book of the Home: A Comprehensive Guide on All Matters Pertaining to the Household, 1909, 6 volumes, Editor
- Etiquette for every day, 1902
- Manners for girls, 1901
- Beauty Adorned, 1901
- Madge's Book of Cookery and Home Management, 1901
- How to be Pretty Though Plain, 1899
- A word to women, 1898
- The Century Invalid Cookery Books, 1989
- Manners for men, 1897
- Manners for women, 1897
- Cookery Up-to-Date, 1896
- Housekeeping: A guide to domestic management, in one volume, 1893
