= John A. O'Farrell House =

Historic house in Idaho, United States

- U.S. National Register of Historic Places
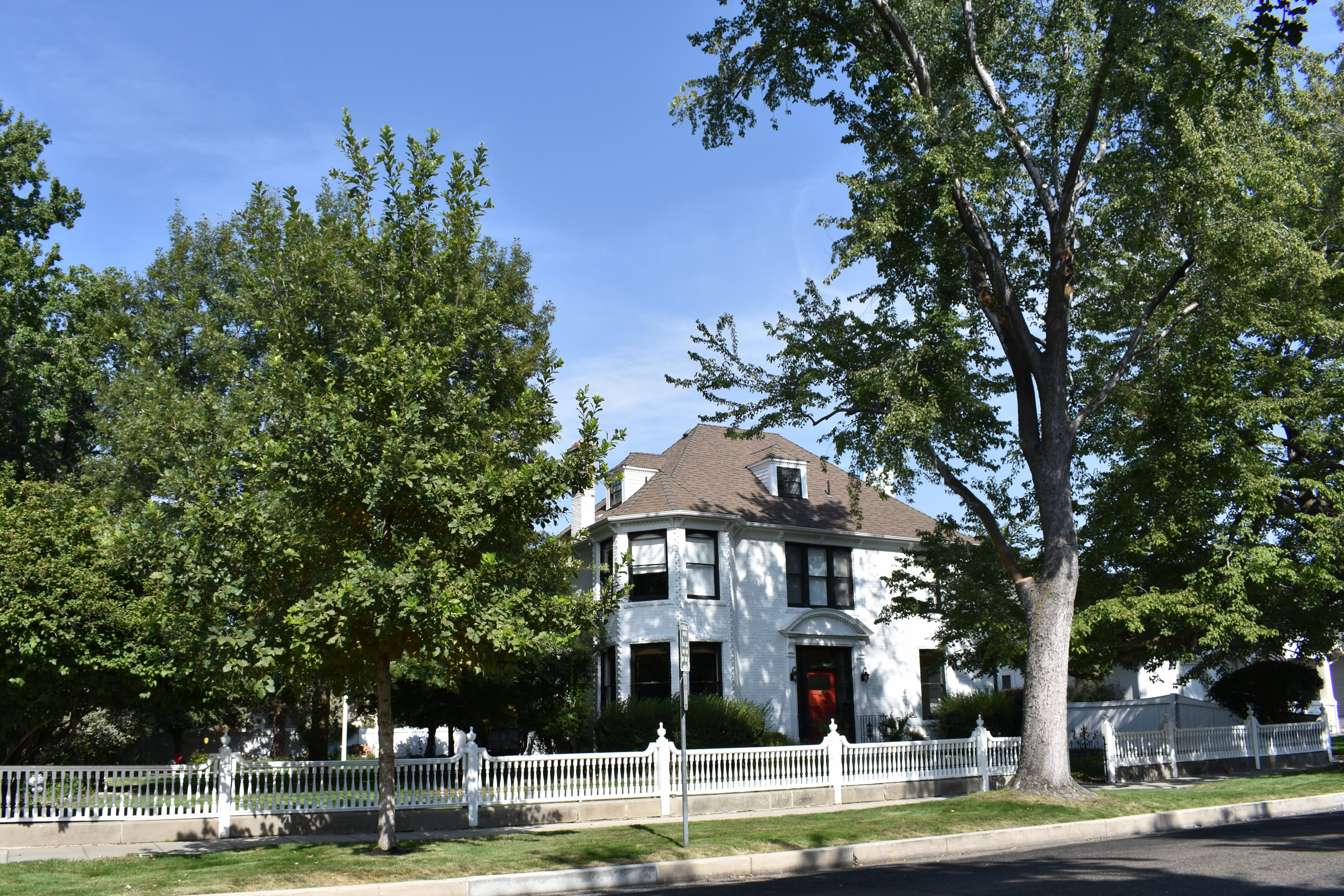
- The O'Farrell House as it appeared in 2018

- Location within Idaho Location within the United States
- Location: 420 W Franklin St., Boise, Idaho
- Coordinates: 43°37′07″N 116°11′27″W
- Built: 1892
- Architect: N. W. Bower
- Architectural style: Colonial Revival; Queen Anne
- NRHP reference No.: 79000766
- Added to NRHP: September 4, 1979

The John A. O'Farrell House is a combination of Colonial Revival and Queen Anne styles designed by N. W. Bower and built in Boise, Idaho, in 1892. The house was constructed for John A. O'Farrell, one of Boise City's first residents.

The 3,238 sq ft (300.8 m^{2}) house has four bedrooms and four bathrooms, and it was listed for sale in 2017 at $924,900. The front fence separating the house from West Franklin Street was constructed from a balustrade salvaged from the Dewey Palace Hotel (1903), demolished (1963) in Nampa, Idaho. Original cost of the house in 1892 was $8000.

The house was listed on the National Register of Historic Places September 4, 1979.

== See also ==
John A. O'Farrell Cabin
