= Echoes of Paradise =

- Directed by: Phillip Noyce
- Written by: Jan Sharp; Anne Brooksbank
- Starring: Wendy Hughes; John Lone
- Music by: William Motzing
- Release dates: May 1987 (Cannes); March 31, 1989 (United States)
- Running time: 92 minutes
- Country: Australia
- Language: English
- Budget: A$2.6 million
- Box office: A$19,851 (Australia)

Echoes of Paradise (also known as Shadows of the Peacock) is a 1987 Australian film directed by Phillip Noyce.

== Cast ==
- Wendy Hughes as Maria
- John Lone as Raka
- Rod Mullinar as Terry
- Peta Toppano as Judy
- Steve Jacobs as George
- Gillian Jones as Mitty
- Claudia Karvan as Julie
- Rebecca Smart as Tessa
- Lynda Stoner as Beth Mason

== Production ==
The film was written by Jan Sharp who was then married to the director Phil Noyce. Sharp was going to produce but was held up making The Umbrella Woman so producing duties went to Jane Scott. The story was originally set in Bali, where the movie was to be shot, but before filming began The Sydney Morning Herald ran a series of articles suggesting the wife of the Indonesian president was corrupt. All Indonesian visas for Australians were cancelled and the script was rewritten to be set in Thailand, with several keys scenes shot in Sydney.

Phil Noyce later said the story was so distorted by this change they probably would have been better off not making the movie:

The original story was very different. It was really about the Balinese character's alienation and his coming to terms with it, coming to terms with a western influence and his traditional obligations, trying to work it all out. Wendy Hughes' character went through a very similar journey in the original story. It's just that the setting and the Balinese character were very different once we moved to Thailand.

== Box office ==
Echoes of Paradise only grossed $19,851 at the box office in Australia.
