= Minnesota Conference =

Defunct Christian denomination in the United States

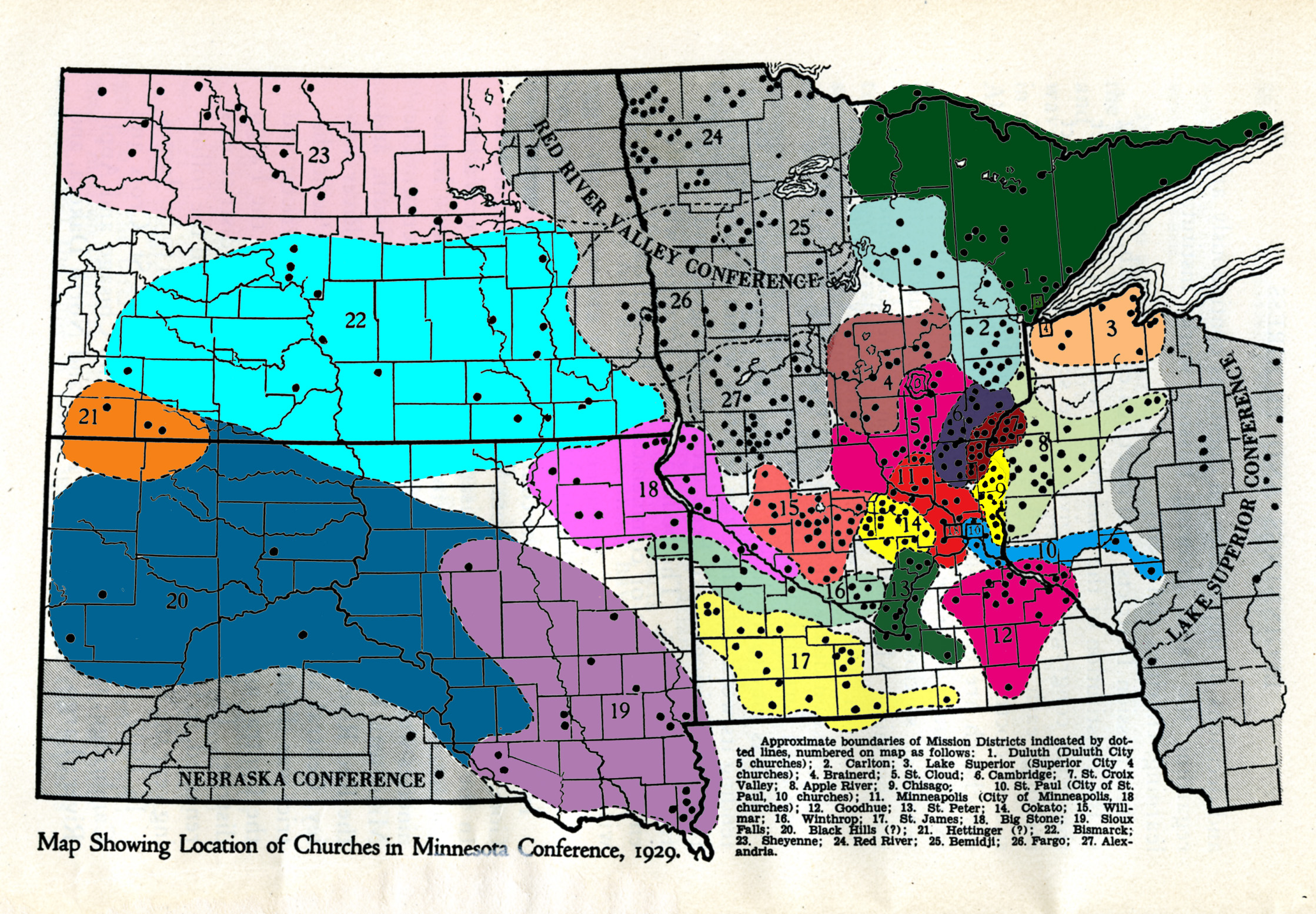
This is a 1929 map of the districts of the Minnesota Conference of the Augustana Evangelical Lutheran Church.

The Lutheran Minnesota Conference was one of the 13 conferences of the Augustana Evangelical Lutheran Synod. Formed by Swedish immigrants in the 1800s, it originally encompassed Minnesota, parts of North Dakota, South Dakota, Canada, and Wisconsin. Its size was substantially reduced years later when Alexandria, Fargo, and Red River Districts became the Red River Valley Conference in 1912, and the Alberta District and Canada Mission field became the Canada Conference in 1913. With the creation of the Lutheran Church in America (LCA) in 1962, it became known as the Minnesota Synod.

Organizers of the Minnesota Conference were Rev. Peter Carlson, Rev. Eric Norelius, Rev. Peter Beckman, Rev. Johan Peter Carlson Boren and laymen Daniel Nelson, Hakan Svedberg, Frans C. Bjorklund, and Ole Paulson were present at the first meeting of the Minnesota Conference held October 7–9, 1858 at Chisago Lake. At the end of 1961, the Minnesota Conference had the most baptized members of any conference in the Augustana Synod with 182,374 baptized members and 300 congregations.

In 1862 members of the Minnesota Conference founded Minnesota Elementary School in Red Wing, which was renamed St. Ansgar’s Academy and moved to East Union in 1865. The institution relocated to Saint Peter in 1876 and was officially recognized as Gustavus Adolphus College. Other educational institutions erected by the Minnesota Conference include Minnesota College, founded in 1904, Lutheran Bible Institute, founded in 1919, and North Star College and Northwestern College, which both became part of the Red River Conference.

== Districts ==
Apple River District, Big Stone District, Chisago District, Cokato District, Goodhue District, Iron Range District, Lake Superior District, Mille Lacs District, Minneapolis District, Montevideo District, St. Croix District, St. James District, St. Paul District, St. Peter District, Sioux Falls District, Willmar District

== Presidents ==
The following served as president of the Minnesota Conference:

- 1858: Johan Peter Carlson Boren
- 1859: Peter Anderson Cederstam, Peter Carlson, Johan Peter Carlson Boren
- 1860: Peter Anderson Cederstam, Eric Norelius
- 1861: Johan Peter Carlson Boren, L. H. Noren, Eric Norelius
- 1862: Peter Anderson Cederstam, Andrew Jackson
- 1863: Carl August Hedengran, Johan Peter Carlson Boren, Peter Carlson
- 1864: Eric Norelius, John Pehrson, Andrew Jackson
- 1865: N. Olson, Eric Norelius, Peter Carlson
- 1866: Andrew Jackson, Carl August Hedengran, John Pehrson
- 1867: Eric Norelius, Peter Carlson, Peter Anderson Cederstam
- 1868: John Pehrson, Andrew Jackson, Peter Carlson
- 1869: Andrew Jackson, Ole Paulson, Peter Carlson
- 1870: Peter Sjöblom, Eric Norelius
- 1871–1873: Eric Norelius
- 1874: Peter Sjöblom
- 1875: Jonas Auslund
- 1876: Peter Sjöblom
- 1877: Jonas Ausland, Peter Anderson Cederstam
- 1878: Peter Sjöblom
- 1879: Eric Norelius
- 1880: Andrew Jackson
- 1881–1882: Peter Sjöblom
- 1883–1886: Johannes Fremling
- 1887: Per Johan Swärd
- 1888–1892: Peter Sjöblom
- 1893–1896: Eric Norelius
- 1897–1899: Johannes Fremling
- 1900: Peter Sjöblom
- 1901–1904: Johannes Fremling
- 1905–1912: Johan Ander Krantz
- 1913–1938: Peter A. Mattson
- 1939: Peter A. Mattson, Emil Swenson
- 1940–1954: Emil Swenson
- 1955: Emil Swenson, Leonard A. Kendall
- 1956–1962: Leonard A. Kendall
