= Andrew Jackson (pastor) =

Swedish-American pastor (1828–1901)

Andrew Jackson (February 11, 1828 – July 23, 1901) was a Swedish-American Lutheran minister who served as president of the Minnesota Conference of the Augustana Evangelical Lutheran Church.

== Biography ==
Andrew Jackson was born to Olaf Jakobson and Petronella Olofsdotter in the parish of Valla on the island of Tjörn in the province of Bohuslän, Sweden. Jackson had 11 siblings: seven brothers and four sisters.

His education began at formal school in Marstrand in Västra Götaland and from there he attended high school and college in Gothenborg, Sweden. During school vacations he worked as a private tutor, and while working for one of his clients, Captain Klase, he was inspired and encouraged to go to sea in 1852. He boarded a ship bound for New York City, but upon arrival there deserted his ship to sign on with another crew. He had signed on under the common Swedish surname Dahlin, but subsequently changed his last name to Jackson.

H later took a train to Galesburg, Illinois, and settled down to work at a sawmill for five years. At this point he decided to return to New York and worked as a bartender in a saloon. He later met a group of Swedish immigrants from Hälsingland, Sweden, who were headed west to Waupaca, Wisconsin. He joined the immigrant Swedes and became a schoolmaster in the area for the fall and winter term of 1858–1859 until he moved to Minnesota in the summer of 1859, where he met Rev. Peter Carlson, who traveled with him to the settlements of Kandiyohi County.

He decided to attend Augustana College and Seminary in Chicago in the fall of 1860 under the direction of Rev. Lars Paul Esbjorn. He was ordained at the Synodical Convention in Galesburg, Illinois, in June, 1861. He subsequently returned to work in Monongalia County (now Kandiyohi County, Minnesota). He later became director, principal, and head instructor of St. Ansgar's Academy at East Union, Minnesota, in 1863, managing the school until 1876 when it relocated to St. Peter, Minnesota. Additionally he served interim terms as president of the Minnesota Conference of the Lutheran Augustana Synod of America, the starting in 1862 and ending in 1880.

With the end of his school duties, he began working with the congregation in West Union in 1876 and remained there until 1890. However, in 1890 he resumed work with the school (now called Gustavus Adolphus College) as a financial solicitor. Following this role, he spent the final years of his life as the pastor of Rush Lake Swedish Evangelical Lutheran Church in Chisago County, Minnesota. He died at the Bethesda Hospital in St. Paul from inflammation of the urinary tract. His funeral sermon was presided over by his friend and fellow pastor, Dr. Eric Norelius. He was interred in Rush Lake, Minnesota.

== Personal life ==
Jackson and his first wife, Kristina Swenson of Becksville Meeker County, had three children: Hanna, Esther, and Joseph Ausgarius. Jackson later remarried Louisa Peterson of Cannon River, Minnesota.
