= Jan Sharp =

- Born: 16 May 1946; Cobram, Australia
- Died: 24 July 2012 (aged 66); Los Angeles, California, United States
- Occupations: Film producer, director and cinematographer
- Spouse: Phillip Noyce (m. 1979–2004)
- Children: 2

Jan Sharp (16 May 1946 – 24 July 2012) was an Australian film producer, director and cinematographer.

== Biography ==
=== Early life ===
Jan Sharp was born on 16 May 1946 in Cobram, Australia. She attended Catholic boarding schools in Australia. She graduated from the University of Melbourne, where she studied Fine Arts.

=== Career ===
She started her career at Film Australia and later worked for the Australian Broadcasting Corporation. She then worked again at Film Australia, this time as an Associate Producer and Director. Later, she had a weekly column in The Australian and a cultural program on Radio Australia. She continued to work as a film producer in Los Angeles, California.

=== Personal life ===
She was married to Australian film producer Phillip Noyce from 1979 to 2004. They had one daughter, Lucia, and Sharp had a daughter, Alice, by a previous relationship with the well-known Sydney-based artist and cartoonist Michael Lodge. She resided in the former private residence of actress Barbara Stanwyck (1907–1990). She died on 24 July 2012 in Los Angeles, California.

=== Legacy ===
The 39th Telluride Film Festival in 2013 was dedicated to her.

== Filmography ==
=== As a producer ===
- Sue and Mario: The Italian Australians (1979).
- Peter Kenna's The Good Wife (1987).
- Wide Sargasso Sea (1993).
- Damage Control (2008).
- Beard: Pecking Order (2010).

=== As an executive producer ===
- Echoes of Paradise (1987).
- Rick Michele and Scarlett (2010).

=== As a director ===
- Jenny (1978).
- Damage Control (2008).
- Beard: Pecking Order (2010).
- Rick Michele and Scarlett (2010).

=== As a cinematographer ===
- Damage Control (2008).

=== As an editor ===
- Damage Control (2008).
