= Cordelia Lutheran Church =

Historic church in Idaho, United States

- U.S. National Register of Historic Places
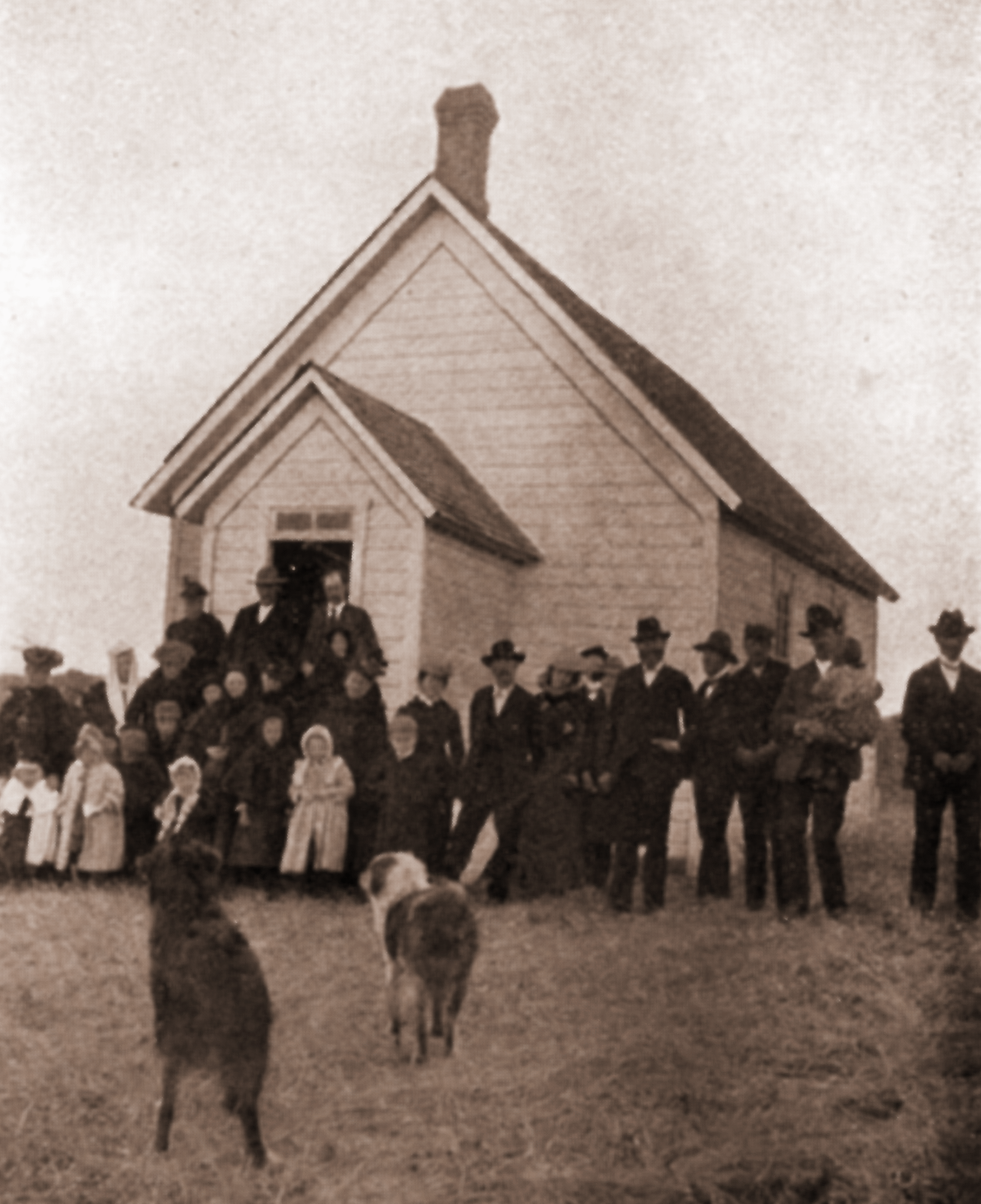
- Cordelia Lutheran 1903

- Location within Idaho Location within the United States
- Location: South of the jct. of Genesee-Troy and Danielson Rds; Latah County, Idaho
- Coordinates: 46°39′37″N 116°53′50″W
- Area: 432 / 40 (ft^{2} / m^{2})
- Built: 1883
- Architect: Peter Carlson
- NRHP reference No.: 95001058
- Added to NRHP: August 31, 1995

Cordelia Lutheran Church was dedicated by Pastor Peter Carlson on December 15, 1883, and is the oldest Lutheran building in the state of Idaho. The church was built on property given by Andrew Olson in the Lenville, Idaho area to serve the Swedish Lutheran families in the area. In 1919, the building ceased to be used for regular church services. The building and surrounding 31 acres (13 ha) is currently owned and administered by a non-profit group named Friends of Cordelia. The building is used for weddings, picnics, socials, concerts and Easter Sunrise service by area residents.

In 1948 money was made available by the daughter of Andrew Olson to restore the building. The structure has undergone several additional major renovations, most recently in 1996 and 2001. The building was added to the National Register of Historic Places in 1995. The site is located south of the junction of the Genesee-Troy Road and Danielson Road to the southeast of Moscow, Idaho in Latah County. There is a small cemetery behind the church.

== See also ==
- National Register of Historic Places listings in Latah County, Idaho
