= H. Pearl Adam =

English journalist and editor, (1882–1957)

- Born: Helen Pearl Humphry; 30 April 1882; London, England
- Died: 2 January 1957 (aged 74); London, England
- Occupation: Journalist
- Mother: C. E. Humphry

Adam's 1916 book International Cartoons of the War.

Helen Pearl Adam (née Humphry; 30 April 1882 – 2 January 1957) was an English journalist who documented her experience in Paris during World War I.

== Early life ==
She was born Helen Pearl Humphry in St John's Wood, London, on 30 April 1882, the only child of Irish journalist C.E. Humphry (born Charlotte Eliza Graham) and her husband Joseph Alfred Humphry, who managed the advertising department of a newspaper.

Trained by her mother, she began her own journalistic career at the age of 17. As H. Pearl Humphry, she wrote for several magazines and also appeared as Mrs Varden in a production based on Barnaby Rudge.

In 1909, she married fellow journalist George Jeffreys Adam. In 1910, she was invited to visit Galicia by the Association for the Promotion of Tourism in Galicia as part of a press junket for the Lady's Pictorial and Sheffield Daily Telegraph.

== Paris career ==
In wartime Paris, Adam wrote for several British newspapers, also publishing an edited collection of International Cartoons of the War (1916) and Paris Sees it Through: A Diary (1914–1919), based on her diaries from the time. Remaining in Paris in the 1920s, she wrote for the Evening Standard, the Observer and the Sunday Times.

In 1924, Adam met Ella Lenglet (Jean Rhys), who tried to sell her some translations of her husband's articles. Adam instead saw potential in Rhys's diary, and invited her to live with the Adams in their Paris flat while she edited Rhys's writing into a novel, Suzy Tells. She passed this unpublished manuscript on to Rhys' future mentor Ford Madox Ford, who published an extract of it under the title 'Vienne' (claiming it was 'from the novel Triple Sec'), and suggested that Lenglet adopt the pen name Jean Rhys.

Back in England, Adam became involved with the National Council of Women of Great Britain, editing their jubilee book in 1945.

She died in London on 2 January 1957, aged 74, leaving her body to medical science and the contents of her flat on Marylebone Road to the literary circle, known as The Saturdays, that held weekly meetings there. Some of her diaries and notebooks survive in the Women's Library collection at the London School of Economics.

== Selected works ==
- International Cartoons of the War (1916)
- Paris Sees it Through: A Diary (1914–1919) (1919)
- A Book About Paris (co-authored with George Adam) (1927)
- Women in Council: the Jubilee Book of the National Council of Women in Great Britain (1945)
