= Aneboda =

Coordinates: 57.1207°N 14.5634°E

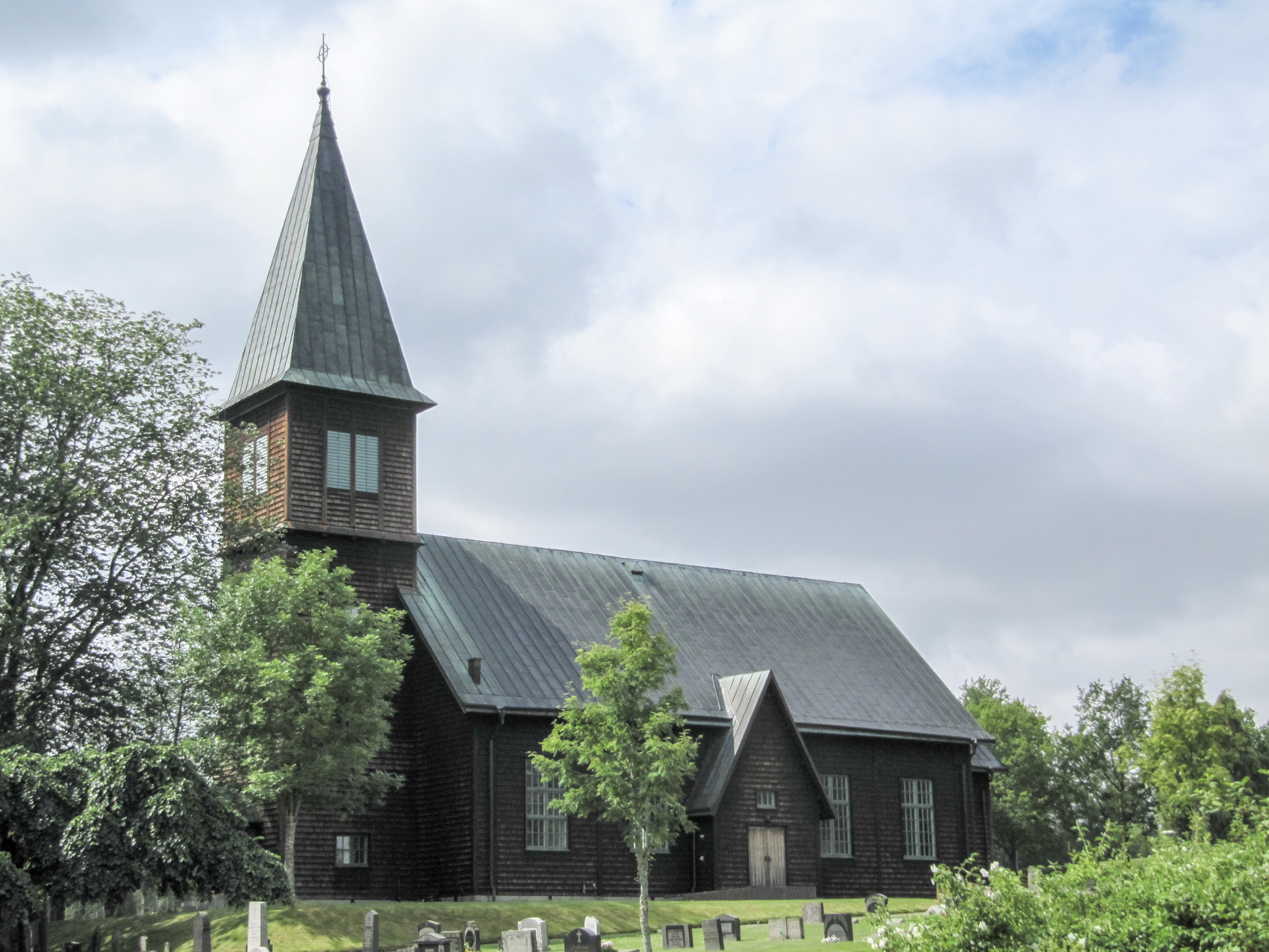
Aneboda church

Aneboda is former Ward in the city of Växjö, Småland (Kronoberg). Aneboda, which has been part of the township Aneboda-Asa-Berg since 2010, is situated between the lakes Stråken and Allgunnen and is a woodland rich in bogs.

Aneboda is a woodland with more than 30 ancient monuments: two cists, some Bronze Age cairns and a graveyard from the Iron Age.

The current tower-fitted wooden church was completed in 1899 and replaced a medieval wooden church, which was demolished the following year. Two medieval saints' relics are preserved there. In Aneboda from the 1380s, there existed a hospital whose director was attached to the cathedral chapter in Växjö.
