= William Coppin =

Irish sailor, shipbuilder and inventor

- Born: 9 October 1805; Kinsale, County Cork, Ireland
- Died: 17 April 1895 (aged 89); Sackville Street, Derry

William Coppin (9 October 1805 – 17 April 1895) was an Irish sailor, shipbuilder, and inventor.

== Life ==
William Coppin was born in Kinsale, County Cork on 9 October 1805. There are no known details of his parents or siblings. At age 15 he was one of a party who rescued six customs men from their capsized revenue cutter on the River Shannon. Having finished his schooling, he emigrated to Saint John, New Brunswick, Canada to take up a position at the shipbuilding firm John W. Smith, which was owned by a relative. He built a boat which was able to run on frozen rivers in 1826, drawing on a native Canadian design. His first ship he built was the Kathleen (1829). He then studied navigation in the West Indies, and earned his master mariner's certificate. While in the West Indies, he met some business men from Derry one of whom, John Kelso, commissioned a boat from him. This was the Edward Reid, and in 1831, Coppin returned to Ireland aboard it on a journey that took just 19 days. Settling in Derry, Coppin captained a number of vessels on the Derry to Liverpool route including the Prudence, Queen Adelaide and the Robert Napier, the latter of which reduced the route sailing time from 21 to 18 hours.

He went on to establish his own shipyard in 1837. The shipyard was a success, and he was employing over 500 men by the 1840s. Alongside his shipyard, he opened a foundry and engineering works in 1840 which manufactured boilers and engines, as well as enlarging the yard's slipway to accommodate ships up to 700 tons. When he launched the Maiden City in 1841, 10,000 people gathered to watch. Having become a prominent local figure, in 1839 the Londonderry corporation held a dinner in his honour, and in 1840 presented him with a silver service. He built the City of Derry in 1839, which showcased many of his inventions, and on the Liverpool to Madras set a record speed of 104 days. His 1842 Great Northern was his most ambitious ship, as one of the first ships with an Archimedean screw propeller, with the ship being exhibited in London in 1843. In 1846 his shipyard was destroyed by a fire, and after this he worked mostly in salvage, raising more than 140 ships. He continued to invent, lodging a number of patents between 1857 and 1886. He sold his foundry and shipyard in 1873, and moved to 14 Sackville Street, Derry. From here he continued to invent, launching a triple-hulled ship, the Tripod Express in 1873. He patented a fishing apparatus with artificial light in 1886.

He married Dora (died 11 September 1866), with whom he had two sons and four daughters. Their daughter, Louisa known as "Little Weesy", died at age three and was the subject of many paranormal experiences Coppin had relating to the fate of the Franklin expedition. Coppin died at his home on Sackville Street on 17 April 1895, and is buried at St Augustine's burying ground.
