= Thomas E. Logan House =

Historic building in Boise, Idaho

- U.S. National Register of Historic Places
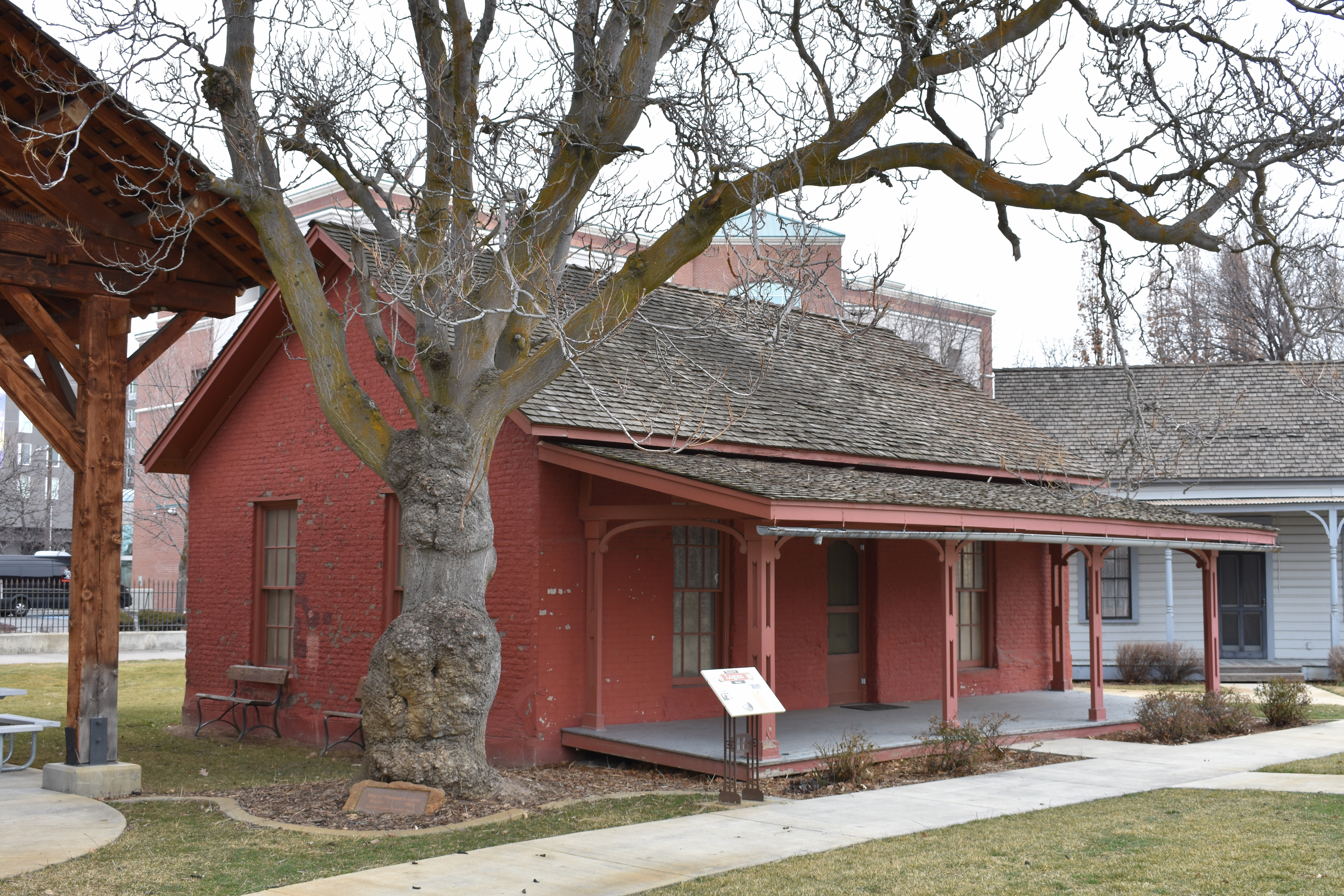
- The Thomas E. Logan House in 2019

- Location within Idaho Location within the United States
- Location: 602 N. Julia Davis Dr., Boise, Idaho
- Coordinates: 43°36′38″N 116°12′16″W
- Area: less than one acre
- Built: 1868
- NRHP reference No.: 71000289
- Added to NRHP: September 22, 1971

The Thomas E. Logan House in Boise, Idaho, is a 1-story adobe structure measuring 32 feet by 22 feet and constructed prior to 1868. The house is Boise's earliest surviving mud brick dwelling, with walls 14 inches thick, set in mud mortar. Mud plaster 3/4-inch thick was applied to the interior walls, and a top coat of lime plaster was applied sometime later; the first coat of oil base paint was applied before 1872.

The house was moved from its original location at 6th and Main Streets to Julia Davis Park and added to the National Register of Historic Places in 1971.

== History ==
The Logan House was built by Boise merchant Charles W. Slocum perhaps as early as 1865. Slocum sold the house to his business partner, James Crawford, and in 1868 Crawford sold the house to dry goods merchant Thomas E. Logan. In 1872 Logan remodeled the house, doubling its size. Logan's additions to the house ended in 1878.

The house remained in the Logan family until 1914. It was purchased by the Mountain Bell Telephone Company in 1970 and donated to the Idaho State Historical Society. It is on display at the Idaho History Museum.

== Thomas E. Logan ==
Thomas E. Logan was born in New York in 1834 and raised in Wisconsin. He and Caroline R. Logan and two children arrived by wagon in Idaho Territory in 1864, settling in Boise City. Logan was listed as a pharmacist in 1865, and he soon entered the dry goods business. He was appointed postmaster of Boise City in 1869, and he was elected to three terms as mayor in the 1870s. Logan retired from business in 1882. He suffered a "stroke of paralysis" in 1893, and he died while returning to Boise from Pasadena, California, on April 28, 1894.

== See also ==
- List of mayors of Boise, Idaho
