= First Presbyterian Church (Kamiah, Idaho) =

Historic church in Idaho, United States

- First Indian Presbyterian Church
- U.S. National Register of Historic Places
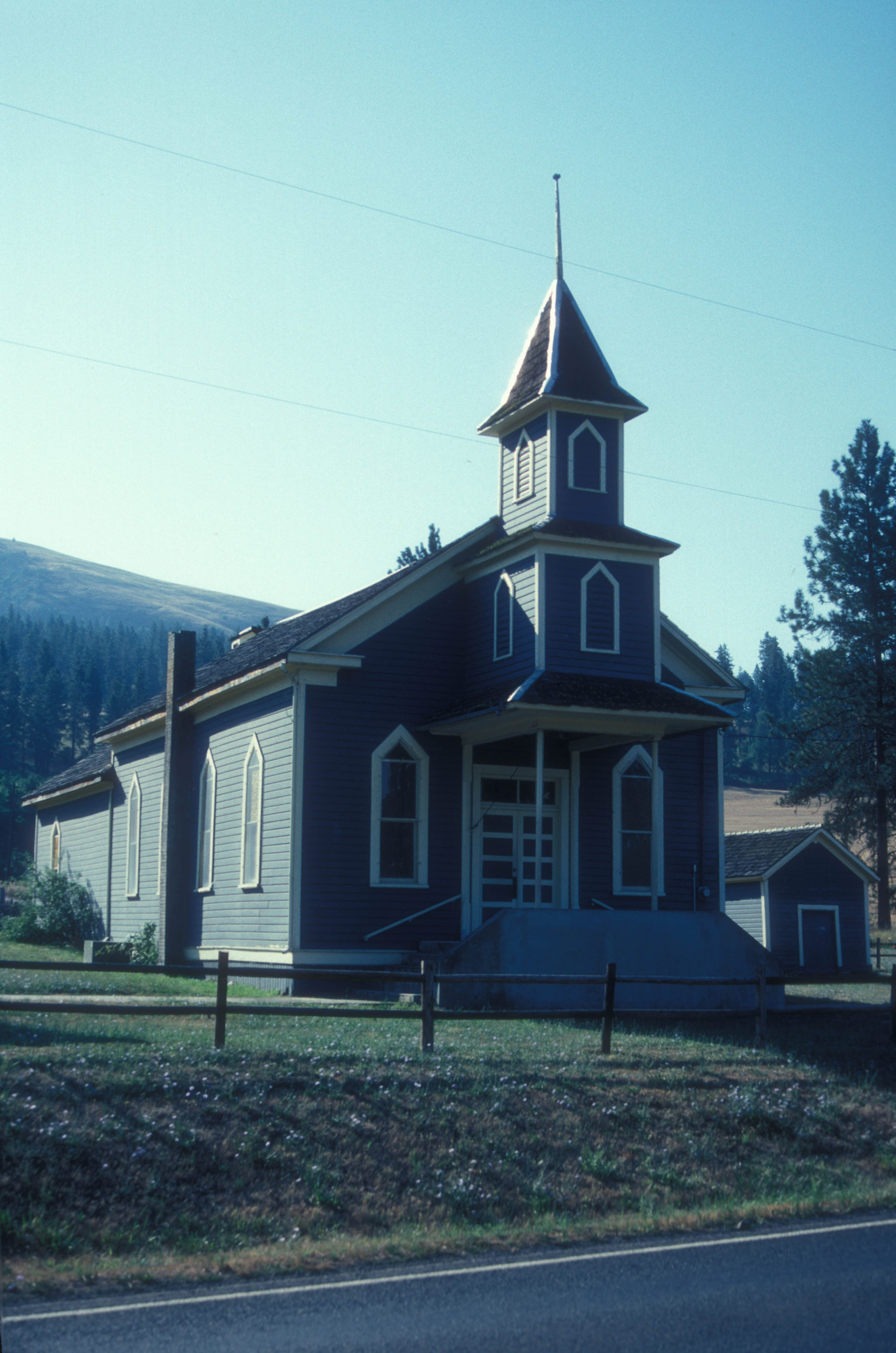

- Location within Idaho Location within the United States
- Nearest city: Kamiah, Idaho
- Coordinates: 46°12′16″N 116°0′20″W
- Area: less than one acre
- Built: 1871
- Architectural style: Greek Revival, Gothic Revival
- NRHP reference No.: 76000674
- Added to NRHP: May 13, 1976

First Indian Presbyterian Church is a historic Presbyterian church to the east of Kamiah, Idaho. The church was constructed in 1871 on land belonging to Chief Lawyer, a member of the Nez Perce tribe. While the church was originally designed in the Greek Revival style, an 1890 renovation gave it a Gothic Revival design. Missionary Henry Spalding briefly lived in Kamiah in 1873 and worked with the members of the church during his time there. The church continues to worship weekly and uses the Nez Perce language in its hymns.

The church was added to the National Register of Historic Places in 1976.
