= W. H. Watt Building =

- Watt, W. H., Building
- U.S. National Register of Historic Places
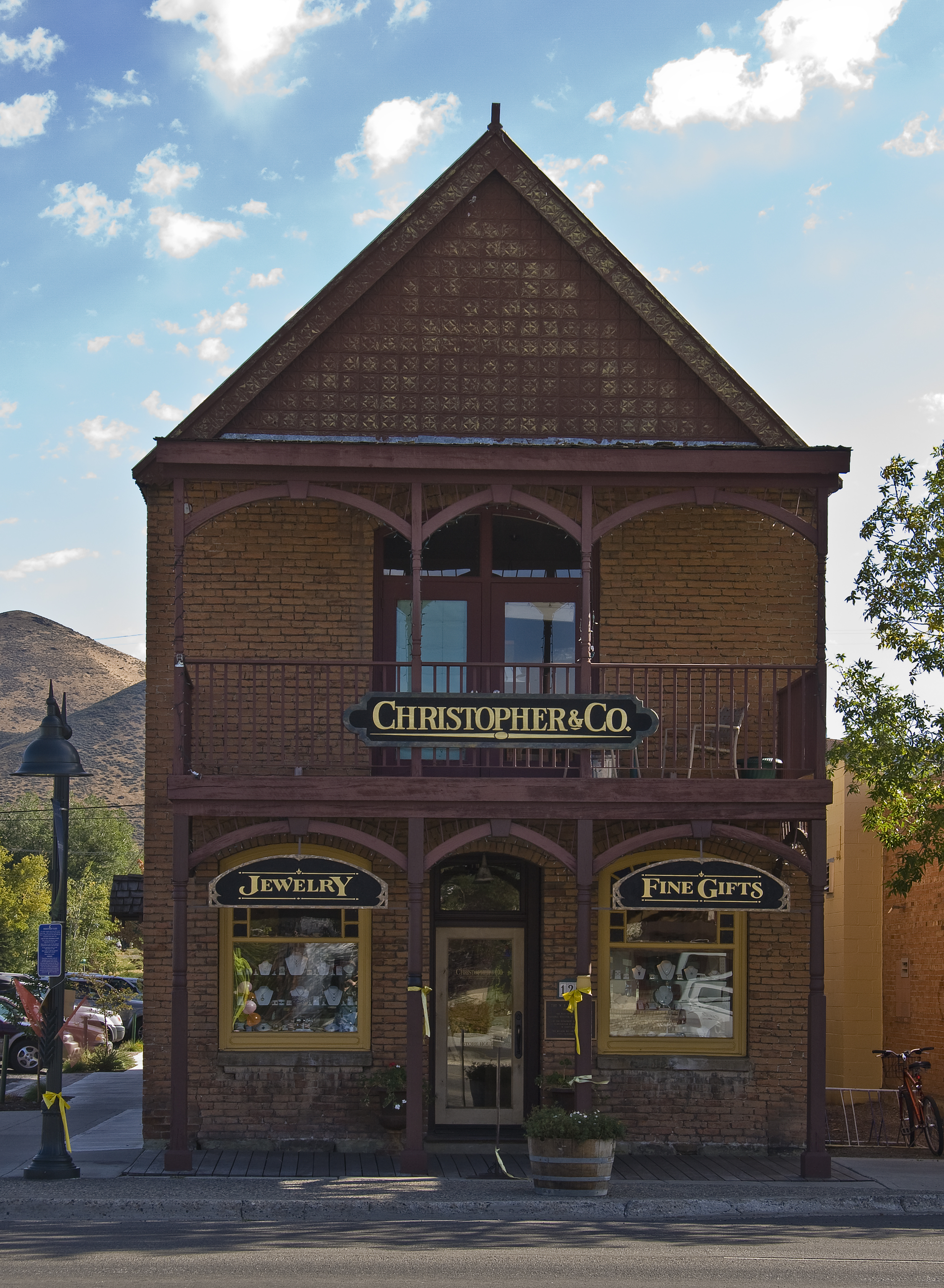
- Photo in 2010

- Location within Idaho Location within the United States
- Location: 120 N. Main St., Hailey, Idaho
- Coordinates: 43°31′14″N 114°18′53″W
- Area: less than one acre
- Built: 1882
- NRHP reference No.: 83000281
- Added to NRHP: March 31, 1983

The W. H. Watt Building, located at 120 N. Main St. in Hailey, Idaho, is a historic building that is listed on the National Register of Historic Places.

Known also as the W.H. Watt Bank and as the Bullwhacker Building, it is a brick building that was built in 1882 or in 1889. It is notable as the office of Dr. Robert Wright, who served the town of Hailey for 60 years.

It was listed on the National Register in 1983 as the W. H. Watt Building.

In 2007 the building hosted a jewelry store.
