= Louisa Coppin =

- Born: 7 September 1845; Ivy House, 34 Strand Road, Derry, Ireland
- Died: 27 May 1849 (aged 3); Ivy House

Louisa Coppin or Little Weesy (7 September 1845 – 27 May 1849) was a supposed Irish ghost.

== Biography ==
Louisa Coppin was born at Ivy House, 34 Strand Road, Derry on 7 September 1845. She was the third child of William Coppin and his wife Dora. She was known as "Little Weesy" to her family. She died on 27 May 1849 from gastric fever, and is alleged to have reappeared to her family 5 months later as "a ball of bluish light". Coppin is supposed to have prophesied the location of Sir John Franklin's 1845 polar expedition before its discovery, by writing on the wall: "Erebus and Terror, Sir John Franklin, Lancaster Sound, Prince Regent Inlet, Point Victory, Victoria Channel".

Coppin appeared to all of her family, with her father giving her advice to Lady Franklin in May 1850. The authorities were highly sceptical, but Lady Franklin took the information more seriously. The Derry Journal (29 March 1889) claimed that the admiralty was petitioned by 430 Liverpool merchants and bankers to search the area specified by Coppin. It was at this location, supposedly predicted by Coppin's ghost, that the 1859 expedition discovered remains from the expedition on King William Island.

The story of the ghost of Coppin was published later in J. Henry Skewes's Sir John Franklin: the true secret of the discovery of his fate (1889), a sensationalist and inaccurate account of the events around the discovery of Franklin's lost expedition. The captain of the rescue expedition, Francis McClintock, and relatives of Lady Franklin denied that the paranormal advice was used in their search. There is no evidence of correspondence or other material relating to the Coppins in Lady Franklin's papers, with some speculating that her relatives might have destroyed it after her death.

The story of "Little Weesy" was the subject of Liam Browne's novel The emigrant's farewell (2006).

It was also the subject of a children's novel Chasing Ghosts- An Arctic Adventure by Nicola Pierce (2020).
