= John A. O'Farrell Cabin =

- U.S. National Register of Historic Places
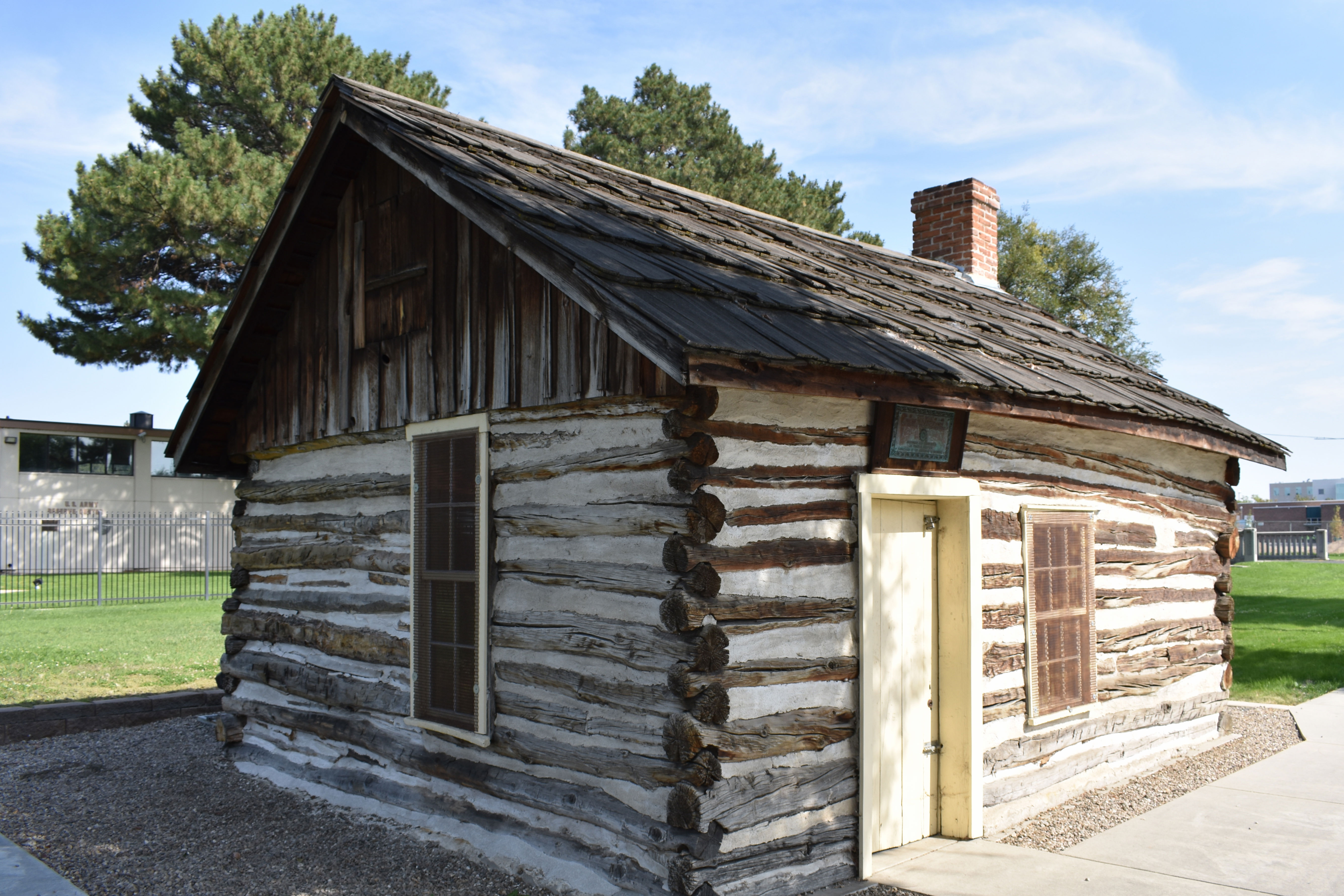

- Location within Idaho Location within the United States
- Location: 450 W Fort St., Boise, Idaho
- Coordinates: 43°37′09″N 116°11′36″W
- Built: 1863
- Architectural style: Log cabin
- NRHP reference No.: 99001415
- Added to NRHP: December 3, 1999

The John A. O'Farrell Cabin was built by John A. O'Farrell in Boise, Idaho, in 1863. The cabin is considered the first family home in Boise.

== History ==
The 200 sq ft (19 m^{2}) cabin was built of cottonwood logs near the entrance to the reconstructed Fort Boise in 1863, and it precedes the original plat of Boise City. O'Farrell made improvements to the cabin in 1864, including glass windows, a hinged door, and a shingle roof. Catholic services were held at the cabin from 1863 until 1870, and the O'Farrells lived in the cabin until 1872.

In 1910 the cabin was moved 200 ft (61 m) to its current location, and it became the property of the Daughters of the American Revolution. The DAR restored the cabin in 1911. In 1958 a protective cover was added, then in 1993 the cabin became the property of Boise Parks and Recreation, and it was restored again in 2002.

The cabin was listed on the National Register of Historic Places December 3, 1999.

== See also ==
Timeline of Boise, Idaho
John A. O'Farrell House
