= Joseph Bown House =

Historic building in Boise, Idaho

- U.S. National Register of Historic Places
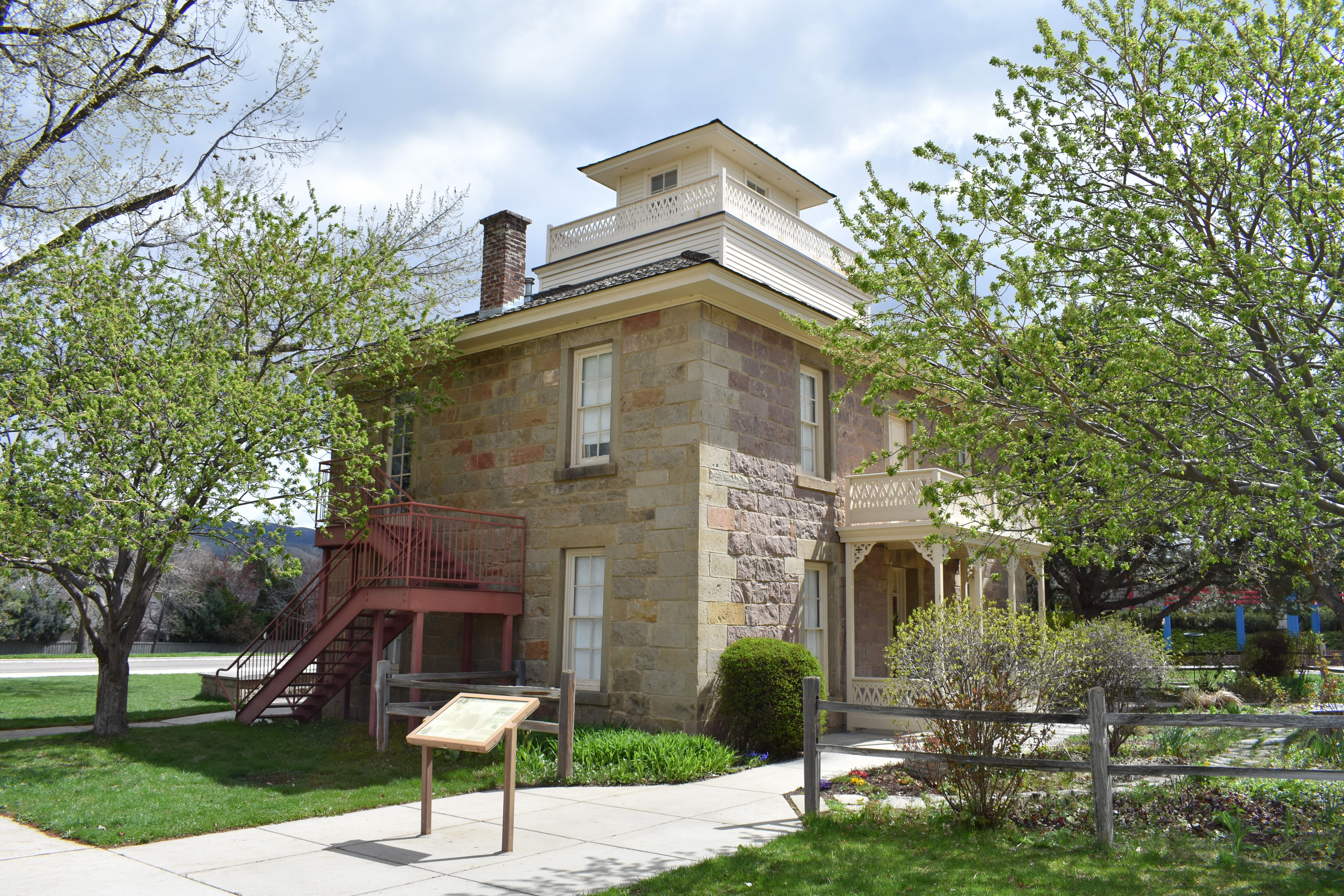
- The Joseph Bown House in 2019

- Location within Idaho Location within the United States
- Location: 2121 E Parkcenter Boulevard
- Nearest city: Boise, Idaho
- Coordinates: 43°34′34″N 116°09′23″W
- Area: 4.2 acres (1.7 ha)
- Built: 1879
- Architectural style: Italianate
- NRHP reference No.: 79000768
- Added to NRHP: June 18, 1979

The Joseph Bown House in Boise, Idaho, is a two-story Italianate house constructed of sandstone in 1879. The house was added to the National Register of Historic Places (NRHP) in 1979.

== History ==
Joseph Bown, a farmer from Waterloo, Iowa, arrived in Idaho Territory in 1863, briefly settling in Idaho City. Later in 1863, he settled east of Boise City, and he brought his family from Waterloo to Boise City in 1865. The Bowns received a deed to their 131-acre homestead in 1869. They and their seven children lived in a cabin at the site of the Bown ranch until construction of the Joseph Bown House in 1879.

During construction, smaller blocks of sandstone from Table Rock were ferried across the Boise River to the Bown ranch, about one mile from the quarry, but larger blocks were loaded onto a wagon and driven to the Morris Bridge, a roundtrip journey of about sixteen miles.

Walls in the house are 22 inches thick, and sandstone casements surround the windows and doors. A center cupola was constructed of wood above the pyramid roof, but the cupola had been removed prior to 1941, and it had not been restored before preparation of the nomination form for NRHP listing in 1979.

The Bowns occupied the house until 1893. It was owned by W.T. Booth until 1927, when ownership passed to J.R. Bright. The Bown ranch, not including the house, was purchased by Thomas J. Killen in 1917. Later, the house became part of the Tate Dairy property. In 1988 the house was purchased by the Boise School District, and it was restored in the 1990s. The address was changed to that of Riverside Elementary School, 2121 E Parkcenter Blvd.

== See also ==
- Assay Office (Boise, Idaho)
