= Lenville, Idaho =

Unincorporated community in Idaho, United States

Coordinates: 46°38′18″N 116°50′26″W

Lenville is an unincorporated community in Latah County, in the U.S. state of Idaho.

== History ==
A post office called Lenville was established in 1890, and remained in operation until it was discontinued in 1901. Leonard "Len" Nichols, the first postmaster, gave the community its name.
