= History of the Minnesota Democratic–Farmer–Labor Party =

DFL logo

The Minnesota Democratic–Farmer–Labor Party (DFL) is a major political party in the U.S. state of Minnesota. It is affiliated with the national Democratic Party. The party was founded in 1944.

== Background ==
The progressive movement in Minnesota following the American Civil War was initially contained within the Minnesota Republican Party. But by the 1880s, the Republican Party became less receptive to progressive reform. The Farmer's Alliance and Knights of Labor, rising in political power, initially attempted to bring progressivism to the Minnesota Democratic Party during the 1886 gubernatorial campaign of A. A. Ames. After his defeat, the Farmer's Alliance and Knights of Labor failed to regain influence within either the Republican or Democratic Party. In 1890, the Farmer's Alliance organized the campaign of Sidney M. Owen as a third-party candidate. Despite Owen's electoral failure, the Farmer's Alliance secured enough of a voting base that in 1892, they joined with the Populists, who would be able to outperform the Democrats. In 1896, a fusion ticket with the Democrats was created, headed by John Lind. His second gubernatorial campaign, in 1898 on the fusion ticket, was successful. Lind served only one term. In 1902, the fusion was broken, and the Populists' poor performance ended the party. Progressives dominated the Democratic Party for the rest of the decade before slowly losing influence.

=== Origins of the Farmer-Labor Party ===
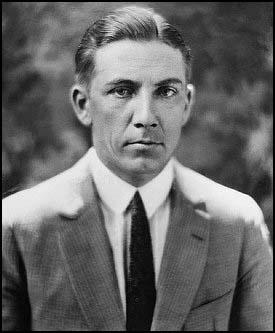
Governor Olson

The Nonpartisan League (NPL), founded in North Dakota in 1915, was an agrarian party focused on farmer grievances against corporate monopolies. It expanded to Minnesota in 1917, and in 1918 merged with the Duluth Union Labor Party to create the Farmer–Labor Party (FLP).

During the 1930s, the FLP gained support for radical platforms aimed at addressing economic and social inequalities. The party won the 1930 Minnesota gubernatorial election under Floyd B. Olson. During this decade, Democrats had minimal success in the state, as the FLP effectively captured the left-wing vote and drew support away from urban workers, rural farmers, and immigrants. The party often won only single digits in statewide races as the FLP aligned informally with President Franklin D. Roosevelt's New Deal coalition.

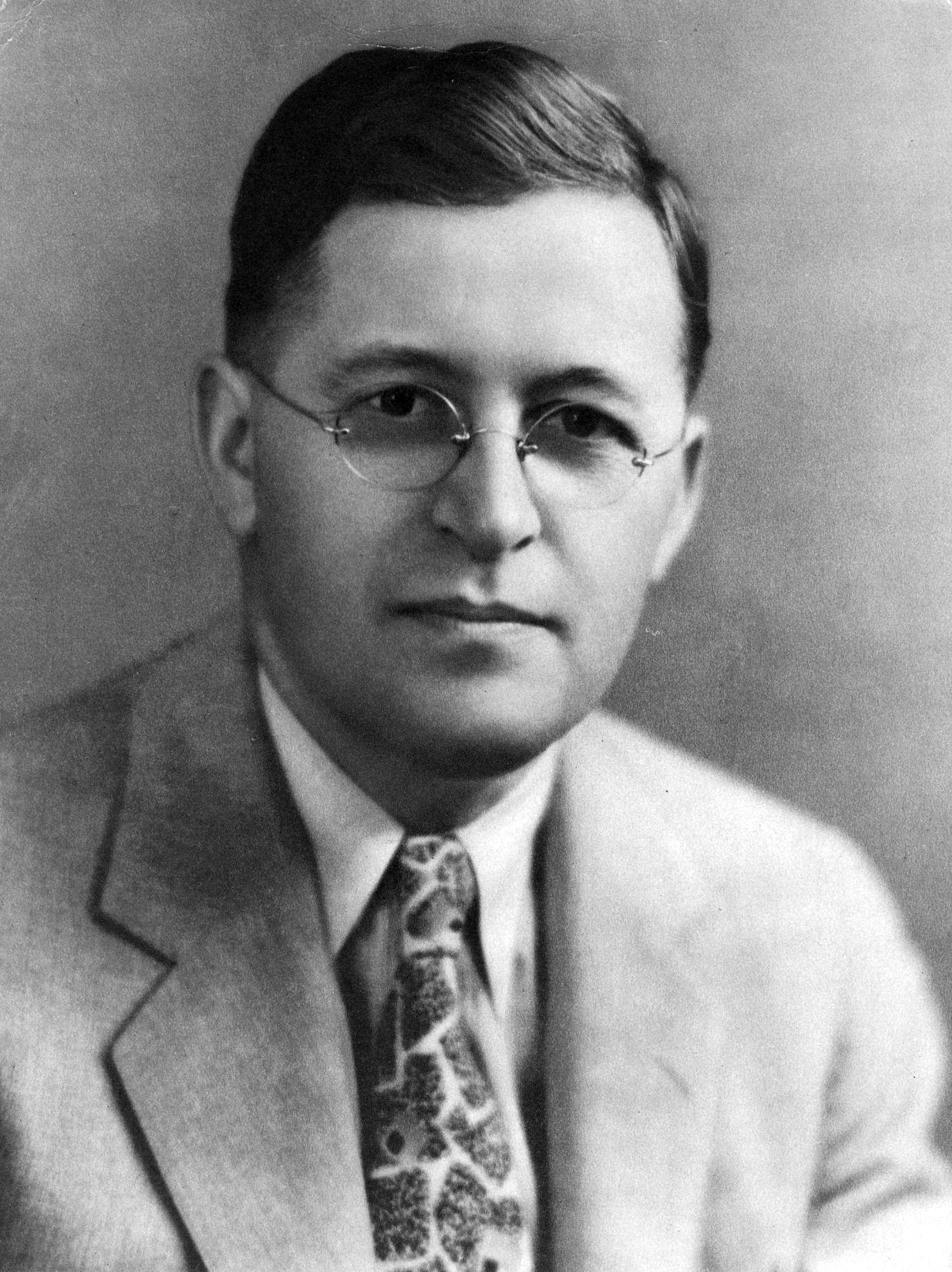
Governor Benson

After Olson died in 1936, Hjalmar Petersen became governor until the inauguration of Elmer Benson. Olson was the unifying figure in the party, and both Benson and Petersen claimed to be his successor. In 1938, Petersen and Benson ran against each other in the primary. Benson led the radical wing and Petersen the more moderate leftist wing. Benson won the primary but lost the general election. Following Benson's defeat, Petersen's faction dominated the FLP. The party suffered further setbacks in 1940 and 1942, losing congressional seats. Petersen failed twice to recapture the governor's office. In December 1940, Petersen met with Democratic leadership about unifying the parties. In 1942, Democrat Theodor S. Slen began opening dialogue with the Farmer-Laborites to discuss merging the parties.

== Founding ==
On April 15, 1944, the Farmer–Labor Party merged with the Minnesota Democratic Party, forming the Democratic–Farmer–Labor Party (DFL) as a united front to oppose the now dominant Minnesota Republican Party. Leading the merger effort were Elmer Kelm, the head of the Minnesota Democratic Party and the founding chairman of the DFL, and Elmer Benson, who had retaken control of the FLP from Hjalmar Petersen after Petersen's electoral defeats in 1940 and 1942. Rising star Hubert Humphrey chaired the Fusion Committee that accomplished the union and then chaired its first state convention.

On April 7, 1944, as the DFL was being founded, a convention was held to determine whether an early nomination for governor could be decided. A unanimous agreement was made to nominate Hubert Humphrey. Humphrey declined, and Theodor S. Slen was asked but also refused to run. The convention dragged through the night. Without a resolution, the convention adjourned at 2:30PM on April 8, after about 24 hours. The convention reconvened on April 9, with 98% of initial delegates returning. Attorney and Olson supporter Harry Walsh was suggested as a potentially uniting figure, but failed to gain support. The hastily assembled primary election was held only a few days later, on April 16.

Byron G. Allen was nominated. Allen was from the Democratic wing, as an unknown dark horse candidate. His nomination was credited to his oratory skills. Allen was also supported by Vice President Henry A. Wallace.

== Factional battles ==
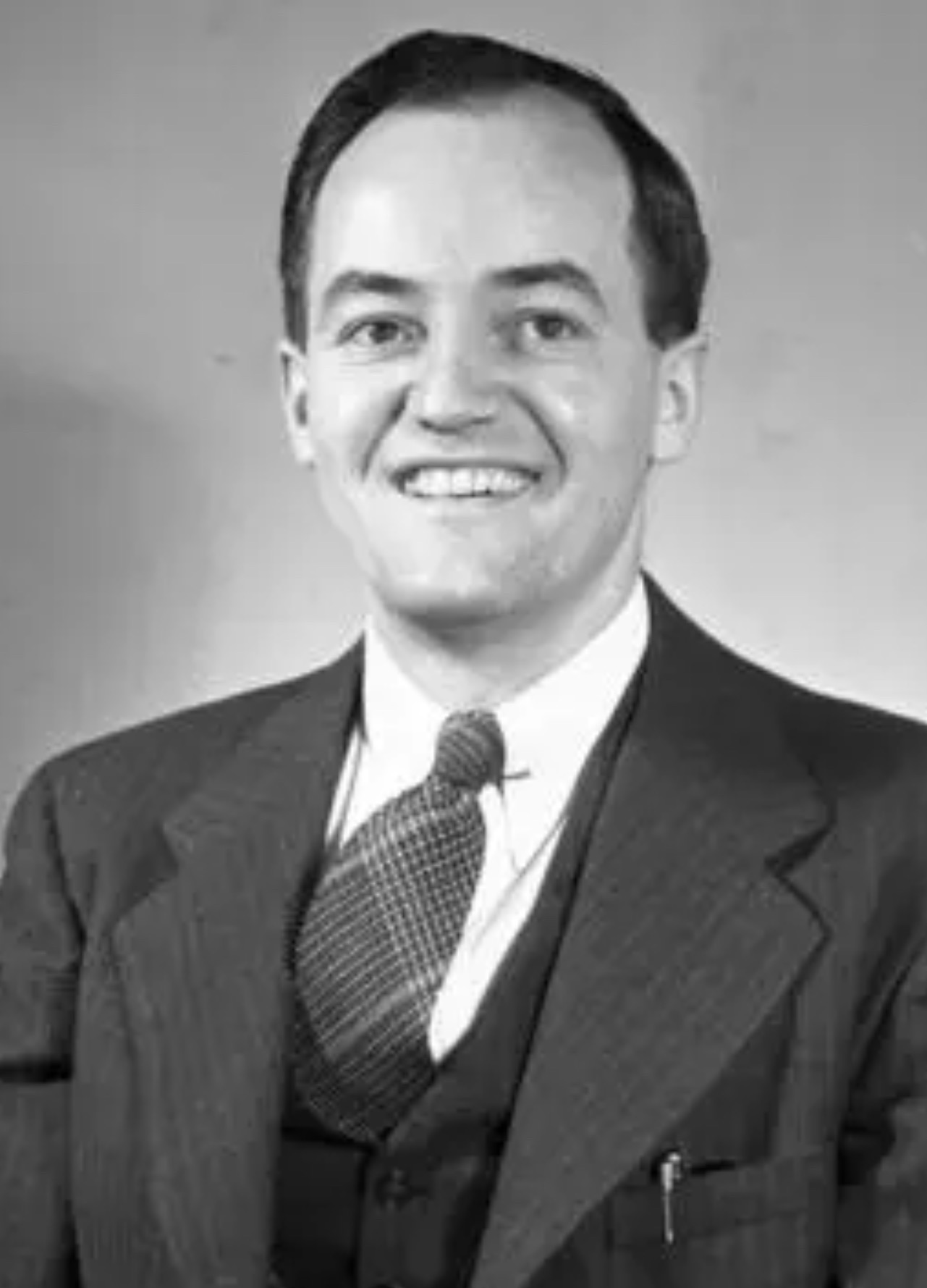
Humphrey while running for Senate

After Allen's defeat and the end of World War II, little held the party together besides opposition to the Republican Party. The party quickly split ideologically into a left wing and a right wing, (Note: referring to leftists, socialists, and progressives as left-wing; and moderates, liberals and conservatives as right-wing.) with ex-governor Elmer Benson initially leading the left and mayor of Minneapolis Hubert Humphrey leading the right. In 1946, Former Speaker of the Minnesota House of Representatives Harold H. Barker replaced Benson as the leader of the left wing, securing both the position of party chairman and the nomination for governor in 1946.

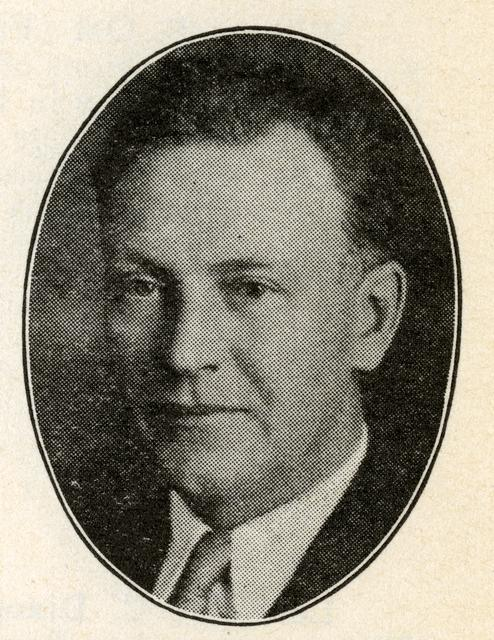
Chairman Barker

Barker continued his control over the DFL after his electoral defeat. In 1947, University of Minnesota student William Kubicek founded the Minnesota Young DFL (YDFL). Kubicek, and in turn the YDFL, became dominated by the party right. In December 1947, the YDFL and Barker's DFL found themselves so divided that Barker considered taking legal action against the YDFL for failing to conform to the larger party's platforms and leadership. By late January 1948, the YDFL had been rejected by the DFL leadership. The YDFL attempted to hold an independent convention separate from the DFL convention, which the DFL leadership considered illegal. The party right managed to regain control of the DFL, with Orville Freeman replacing Barker as chairman, Charles Halsted nominated for governor, and Humphrey nominated for U.S. Senate.

Some members of the left, including Elmer Benson, left the party, joining Henry A. Wallace's Progressive Party. This further weakened the leftists. Taking advantage of the left's weakened state, Humphrey and Freeman announced that Wallace supporters were barred from participation in DFL events. The party left argued that they had a legal right to participate and protested the exclusion. Humphrey accused the left of being agents of the "Russian police state" and the Progressives of seeking to "hobble democracy" on behalf of the Soviet Union. Two party conventions were held, each claiming the other was illegal: a right-wing convention in Brainerd and a left-wing convention in Minneapolis. Each nominated a separate slate for offices. The Minnesota Supreme Court was called to intervene and determine which slate to place on the November ballot. The Court forwarded the matter to Secretary of State Mike Holm. The Brainerd convention's slate was chosen.

That November, the DFL lost again, with the major exception of Humphrey, who was elected to the Senate. This victory and the Progressive Party's failure began to solidify the right's control of the party. By the end of 1949, Humphrey and his allies had taken control of the DFL and reintegrated the YDFL.

In 1950, Halsted ran for governor again. He was challenged by the party's left, who rallied around Harry H. Peterson. Peterson defeated Halsted in the primary, but underperformance and defeat in the general election doomed his political career. Freeman resigned as DFL chairman to run an unsuccessful campaign for Attorney General of Minnesota, and was succeeded by ally and fellow member of the party right Karl Rolvaag.

== Orville-Humphrey era ==
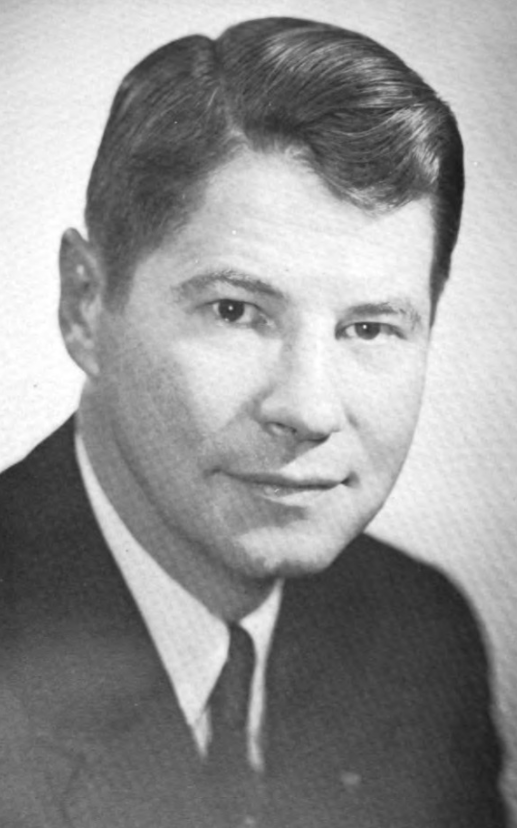
Governor Freeman

In 1952, Orville Freeman won the DFL nomination for governor without opposition from the party left. Freeman secured broad appeal in the party with his "Freeman Programs": increase aid to schools so $100 is invested in every student; remove limits on old-age pension and provide housing to those of a needy age; conduct a survey of all industry in the state and send the results to universities so new industry can be developed from existing infrastructure; establish a well-planned forestry and reforestation program; and create a public health program to help those with debilitating physical injuries and disabilities adjust into society. Freeman lost the general election, but succeeded in ending the factionalism within the party, securing the right wing's control. He and Hubert Humphrey now held control over the party. But their position was not yet secure.

=== Freeman administration ===
In 1954, Karl Rolvaag was nominated to run for lieutenant governor and replaced as party chairman by Ray Hemenway, a loyal ally of Freeman. Freeman was expected to be renominated for governor unanimously, but former Freeman supporter Paul A. Rasmussen mounted a campaign against him. Freeman defeated Rasmussen in a landslide, and won the general election, securing his control over the DFL, as the first DFLer to be governor of Minnesota. Humphrey was also reelected to the U.S. Senate.

Along with Freeman's election and Humphrey's reelection, five other statewide offices were won for the first time. Rolvaag was elected lieutenant governor, Joseph L. Donovan was elected secretary of state, Miles Lord was elected attorney general, Arthur Hansen was elected state treasurer, and Frank Larkin was elected Clerk of the Supreme Court. Although nonpartisan, the House elected DFL-friendly Alfred I. Johnson as speaker. The Minnesota Senate became the only branch of the state government not under DFL control.

Freeman was reelected in 1956 and 1958, starting his third term with a 14-point victory, at the height of his popularity. Also in 1958, Eugene McCarthy was elected to Minnesota's other Senate seat, to serve alongside Humphrey. McCarthy was more progressive than Humphrey, calling himself "twice as liberal as Hubert Humphrey". On December 11, 1959, Freeman took the unusual action of declaring martial law in the city of Albert Lea to maintain law and order during a strike at the Wilson Packing Company. After 12 days, a federal court ruled that martial law was inappropriate. This action quickly eroded Freeman's popularity both inside and outside the party, and he lost reelection to Elmer L. Andersen in 1960.

=== Rolvaag administration ===
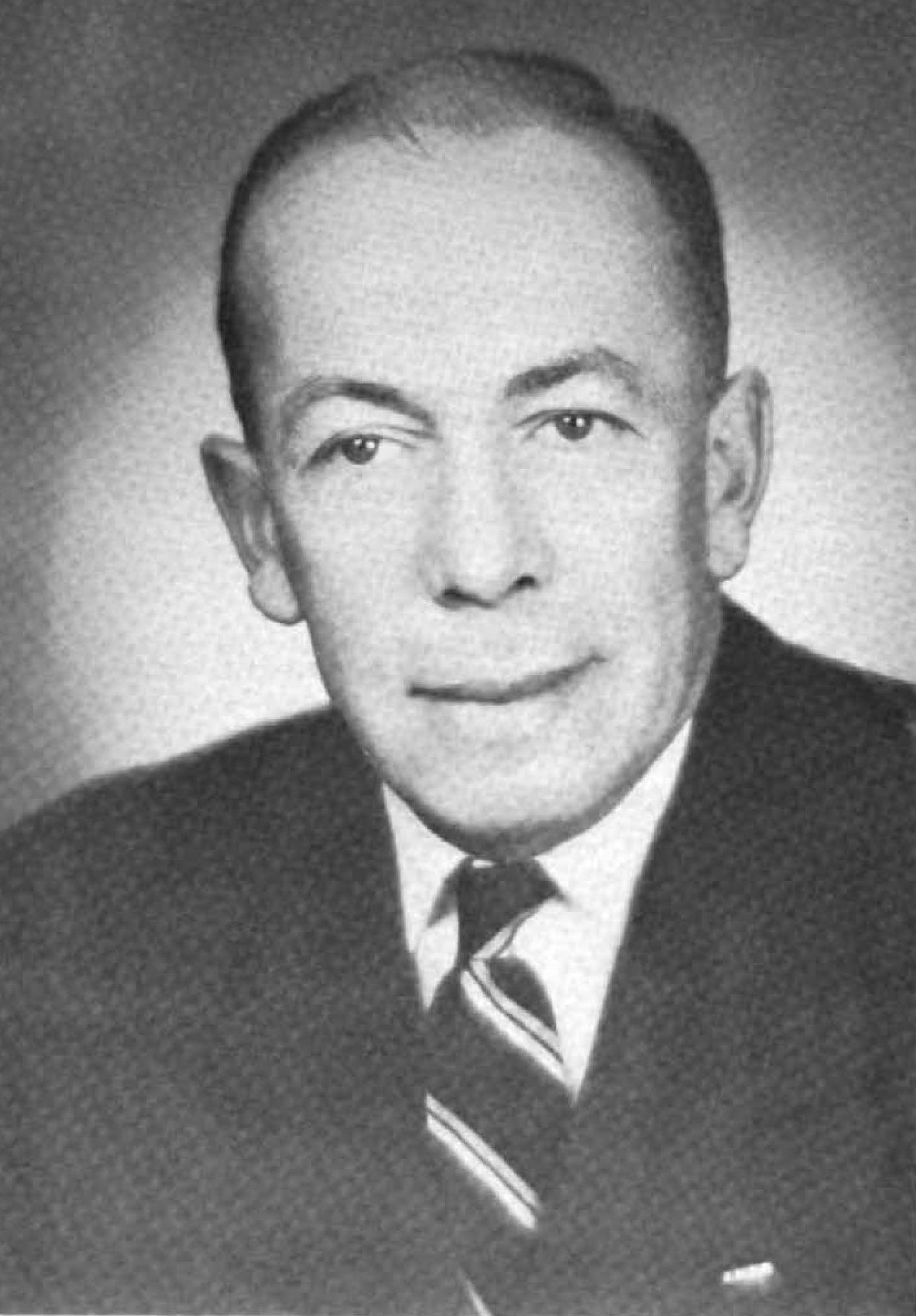
Governor Rolvaag

After his defeat, Freeman was appointed U.S. Secretary of Agriculture by the newly elected President John F. Kennedy, and he was retained in that post by President Lyndon B. Johnson. He served until January 21, 1969. With Freeman and Humphrey both in federal politics, the DFL needed a candidate to replace Freeman as governor. Lieutenant governor Karl Rolvaag was chosen, easily winning his primary. The 1962 election was famously contentious, with the results not known until March 1963. The election was decided by only 91 votes, in Rolvaag's favor.

Rolvaag was the first Minnesota governor to serve a four-year term. The legislature was dominated by conservatives unfriendly to him, and Rolvaag vetoed more legislation than any of his predecessors. In 1964, after Humphrey was elected Vice President of the United States, Rolvaag appointed Walter Mondale to Humphrey's Senate seat.

By the time reelection was being considered, Rolvaag found support within his party dwindling. He had fallen out of favor with Humphrey amid a short list of achievements and worsening alcoholism. The DFL leadership endorsed Lieutenant Governor Sandy Keith for the nomination after a 20-ballot internal election. Undeterred, Rolvaag entered the DFL primary with a cry of "Let the people decide!", and continued support from Freeman. Rolvaag continued his reelection campaign and won the nomination. Keith conceded defeat in the primary election before the full election returns were even counted, due to his massive underperformance. Rolvaag lost the general election. Only two DFLers were reelected statewide in 1966, Secretary of State Joseph L. Donovan and Senator Mondale.

=== 1968 presidential election dispute ===
In November 1967, Senator Eugene McCarthy began his presidential campaign. In April 1968, Humphrey began his presidential campaign. McCarthy and Humphrey held near opposite views on the ongoing Vietnam War, resulting in intense division within the DFL. McCarthy ran as a peace candidate, whereas Humphrey campaigned on the continuation of current policies. Humphrey defeated McCarthy at the 1968 Democratic National Convention.

== Minnesota Miracle to Minnesota Massacre ==
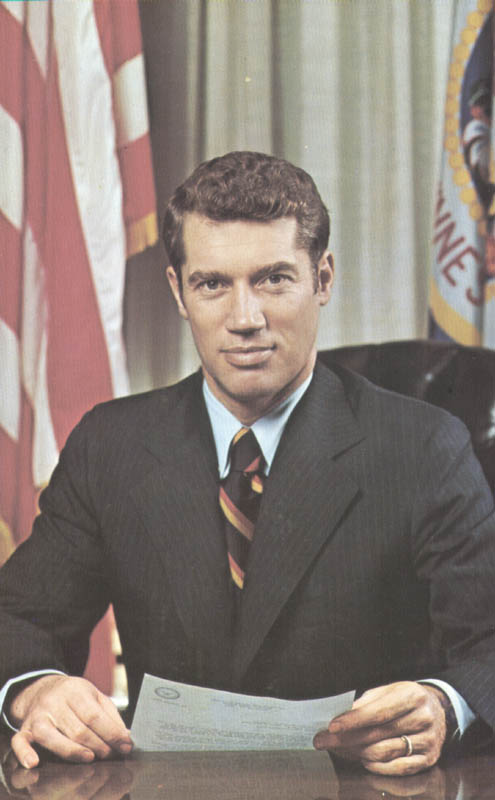
Governor Anderson

In 1970, incumbent Republican governor Harold LeVander did not seek a second term. The young DFLer Wendell Anderson was elected governor, after a unanimous nomination. The largest issue of the election was tax policy. Anderson campaigned on implementing a progressive income tax and shifting the funding for education from local property taxes to statewide sales and income taxes to deal with inequality. His opponent, Douglas M. Head, opposed Anderson's proposed school tax reforms, nicknaming him "Spendy Wendy".

Humphrey was also elected back to the Senate in 1970, after McCarthy retired from that office.

=== Minnesota Miracle ===
Gov. Anderson's re-election result map in 1974

Anderson accomplished his financial and tax goals by 1972. He immediately proposed raising education to 70% of the state budget from 43%, an increase of $750 million. This was funded by sales taxes on cigarettes and alcohol, the progressive income tax he had promised in his campaign, and a higher inheritance tax. 96% of school districts saw funding increase while property taxes decreased. The legislature agreed to make education funding 65% of the state budget. For his efforts, Anderson was featured on a 1973 cover of Time magazine.

In 1973, the previously nonpartisan legislature returned to a partisan model. The DFL was granted an immediate trifecta. The Minnesota House of Representatives elected DFLer Martin Olav Sabo as speaker. The Minnesota Senate elected DFLer Nick Coleman as majority leader.

Anderson won a second term by a landslide in 1974, winning every county in the state. To date, he is the last gubernatorial candidate to do so. The DFL also maintained its trifecta, with a 77% majority in the House and a 56% majority in the Senate, and won every statewide elected office. In 1976, the DFL saw a wave of enthusiasm as Senator Walter Mondale was elected vice president alongside Jimmy Carter as president. The DFL increased its majorities in both chambers of the legislature, now controlling 74% of the House and 70% of the Senate. Also during this time, Chairwoman Koryne Horbal consolidated the previously separate positions of Chairwoman and Chairman into the unified title of State Chair. Under her leadership the number of women in the legislature increased from one to fourteen, all DFLers. Horbal's legacy was established as the DFL Feminist Caucus. The caucus helped elect Joan Growe as Secretary of State in 1975 and Rosalie Wahl as the first female justice on the Minnesota Supreme Court in 1977.

=== Minnesota Massacre ===
With Mondale's Senate seat open, Governor Anderson had the rare opportunity to appoint a senator. This had only happened six previous times, most recently when Mondale himself was appointed as senator in 1964. Anderson made an agreement with lieutenant governor Rudy Perpich whereby Anderson would resign and then be appointed to the Senate by Perpich. Perpich agreed, and became the DFL's fourth governor. Anderson was appointed to the Senate, to await election in his own right in 1978. In January 1978, Humphrey, who held Minnesota's other senate seat, died in office. Perpich appointed Humphrey's widow, Muriel Humphrey, as his successor.

The 1978 elections were not kind to the DFL. Without clear leadership, it fell into tense primary battles, such as the primary for Humphrey's Senate seat. The primary was between two Humphrey loyalists, Donald M. Fraser and Bob Short. Short won the primary but remained unpopular among DFLers. Anderson's move to appoint himself to the Senate proved extremely unpopular. The Independent-Republicans (Note: The Republican Party of Minnesota changed its name to 'Independent-Republican Party' following the Watergate Scandal in 1975, and changed the name back to simply the Republican Party in 1995) nominated David Durenberger and Rudy Boschwitz, who won both of Minnesota's Senate seats. Perpich's campaign also fared poorly. His opponent, Al Quie, capitalized on the unpopularity of Perpich and Anderson and won the governor's office. Completing the massacre, the legislature became split, with a tied House and a small DFL majority in the State Senate, spared because it was not up for election that year.

In 1980, Mike Hatch became State Chair. Hatch began his own movement within the party, called the "Centrists". His plan for retaking power was to ignore factionalism and direct the party to nominate whoever was most likely to win.

== Perpich administration ==
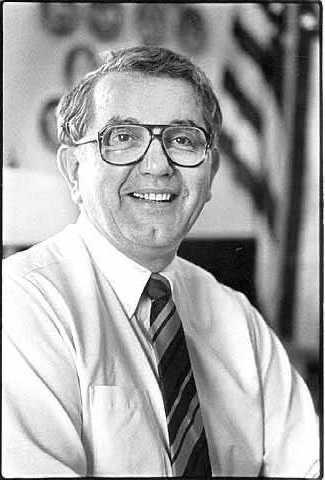
Governor Perpich

During Quie's term, Minnesota had a budget crisis and a strike by state employees. A supporter of supply-side economics, Quie admitted his policies had failed and did not run for reelection. The DFL leadership, led by Hatch and the Centrists, intended for Warren Spannaus (DFL chairman from 1967 to 1969 and incumbent Attorney General) to be the 1982 nominee. But Perpich challenged Spannaus in the primary and narrowly defeated him. The Centrists were opposed by feminists, pro-lifers, pro-gun controllers, and gay rights activists. Perpich won the general election in a landslide, solidifying his control. In 1983, Mary Monahan replaced Hatch as State Chair.

In 1984, Mondale ran for president. He ran a liberal campaign, supporting a Nuclear Freeze campaign and the Equal Rights Amendment (ERA). He spoke against Reaganomics and in support of reducing federal deficit spending. But the incumbent, Ronald Reagan, was popular, and Mondale's campaign was widely considered ineffective. Mondale was also perceived as supporting the poor at the expense of the middle class. He lost in a landslide, winning only Minnesota and the District of Columbia.

In 1986, Perpich was challenged by George Latimer in the primary. Perpich won by an even larger margin than before, and again won the general election in a landslide.

Perpich's legacy of projects in Minnesota include the University of Minnesota Duluth Natural Resources Research Institute, established in 1983, the Center for Victims of Torture, founded in 1985 in Minneapolis, the Minnesota World Trade Center, opened in 1987 in Saint Paul, and the Perpich Center for Arts Education, opened in 1989 in Golden Valley. He worked with James H. Lindau to approve the Mall of America in Bloomington. Perpich was the first governor to promote Minnesota on the international stage by traveling to a record 17 countries in 1984, and bringing the foreign leaders Mikhail Gorbachev of the USSR and Franjo Tuđman of Croatia to Minnesota in 1990.

== As opposition ==
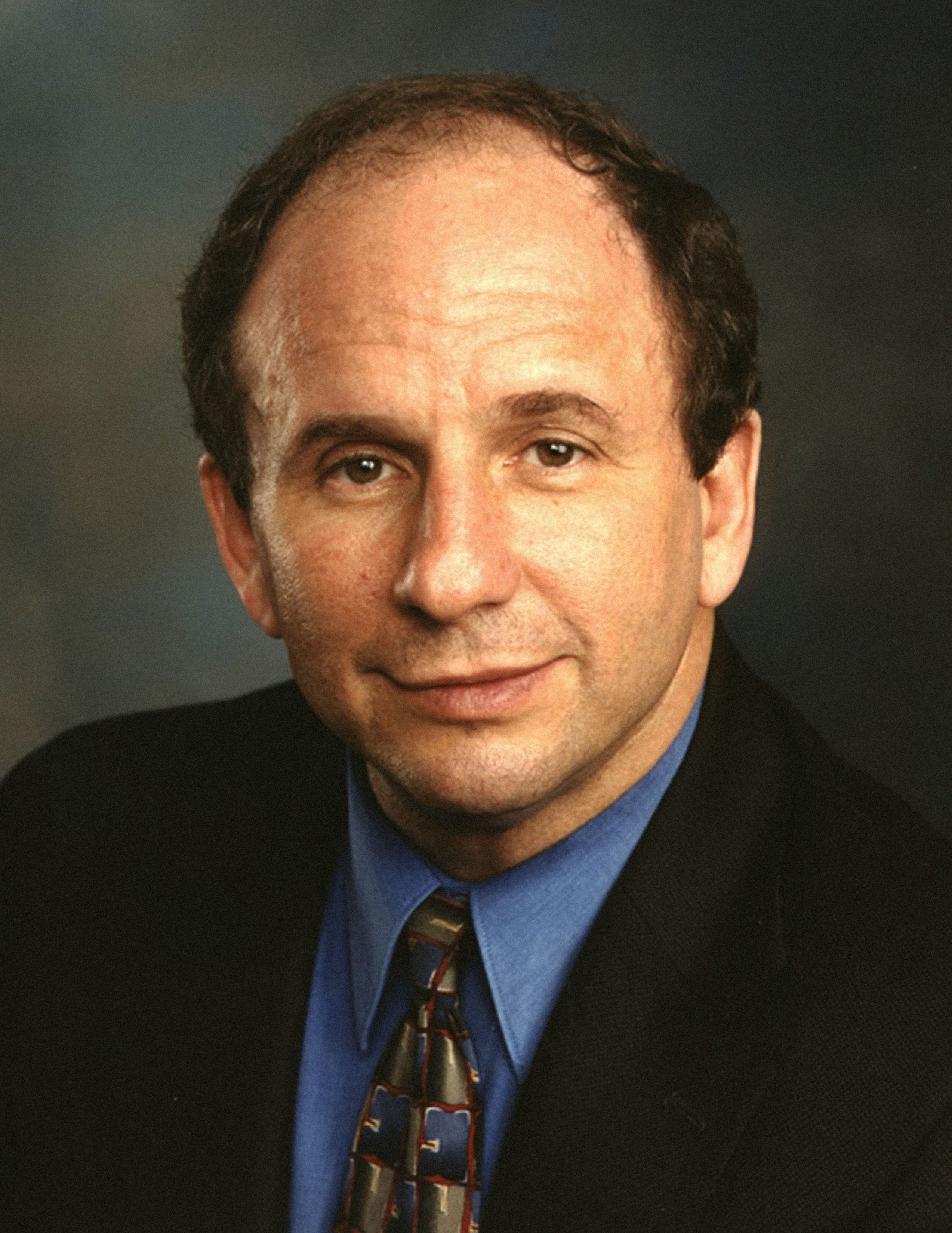
Senator Wellstone

The Perpich administration ended in 1990 when he lost his bid for a third term to Republican nominee Arne Carlson.

Meanwhile, a new de-facto leader of the DFL emerged outside the governor's office. In 1990, Paul Wellstone was elected to the U.S. Senate. Wellstone defeated incumbent Rudy Boschwitz, elected during the Minnesota Massacre. He used grassroots campaigning tactics, and campaign ads like "Fast Paul", in which he spoke quickly about himself and his platform, and "Looking for Rudy", a two-minute ad in which he searched for Boschwitz throughout Minnesota.

Wellstone made the issue of mental illness a central focus in his career. He supported immigration, was a leading figure against the Gulf War, and in 2002 spoke out against the George W. Bush administration's threats to invade Iraq. He was strongly supported by groups such as Americans for Democratic Action, the AFL–CIO, the Sierra Club, the American Civil Liberties Union, and People for the American Way. He was often called "the conscience of the Senate".

In 1992, DFLer Dee Long became the first woman to be elected speaker of the Minnesota House. In 1993, Rick Stafford was elected state chair, the first gay leader of any major party in the country.

In 1994, John Marty was nominated to run against Carlson, with party leadership support. Mike Hatch was defeated in the primary. Marty lost in a landslide, in the DFL's worst gubernatorial performance yet. In 1995, Stafford resigned as state chair for health reasons.

In the chaotic gubernatorial election of 1998, Hubert Humphrey's son Skip Humphrey was initially seen as the front-runner, having won a $6 billion settlement with the tobacco industry in May of that year as Minnesota Attorney General. The DFL primary saw candidates mostly focusing on issues, rather than attacking Humphrey. Humphrey's strongest rival was Michael O. Freeman. A convention deadlock was broken when the labor caucus led by MAPE delegate David Schmidt endorsed Humphrey, pushing him over the top. The primary was nicknamed the "My Three Sons" campaign, owing to the pedigrees of three of the candidates—Humphrey, Michael Freeman (son of Orville Freeman), and Ted Mondale (son of Walter Mondale). Mark Dayton was also the heir to the Dayton's fortune. Initially, Republican nominee Norm Coleman seemed to be the largest threat. But Reform Party nominee Jesse Ventura turned out to be a secondary threat. His aggressive grassroots campaign featured a statewide bus tour, pioneered use of the Internet for political purposes, and aired TV ads using the phrase "Don't vote for politics as usual", advocating for his style of libertarian politics.

In a major upset, Ventura won the election, and Humphrey received only 28.09% of the vote, placing third. The DFL also lost control of the House to the Republicans and lost seats in the Senate.

In 2000, Dayton retook Minnesota's other Senate seat, giving DFLers both of Minnesota's Senate seats again. But on October 25, 2002, Wellstone died in a plane crash while campaigning for reelection. Mondale replaced him as the DFL nominee and lost to Republican nominee Norm Coleman.

In 2002, the DFL nominated longtime Senate leader Roger Moe for governor. Moe lost to Republican nominee Tim Pawlenty. In 2004, the Progressive Caucus was founded and elected Brian Melendez as State Chair. In 2006, the DFL nominated former Centrists leader and incumbent Minnesota Attorney General Mike Hatch for governor. He lost to Pawlenty, but DFL nominee Amy Klobuchar was elected to the Senate in a landslide.

In 2008, DFL nominee Al Franken unseated Coleman in the U.S. Senate, but the election was so close that recounts and litigation prevented him from taking office until July 7, 2009. Franken won by 312 votes.

== Recent history ==
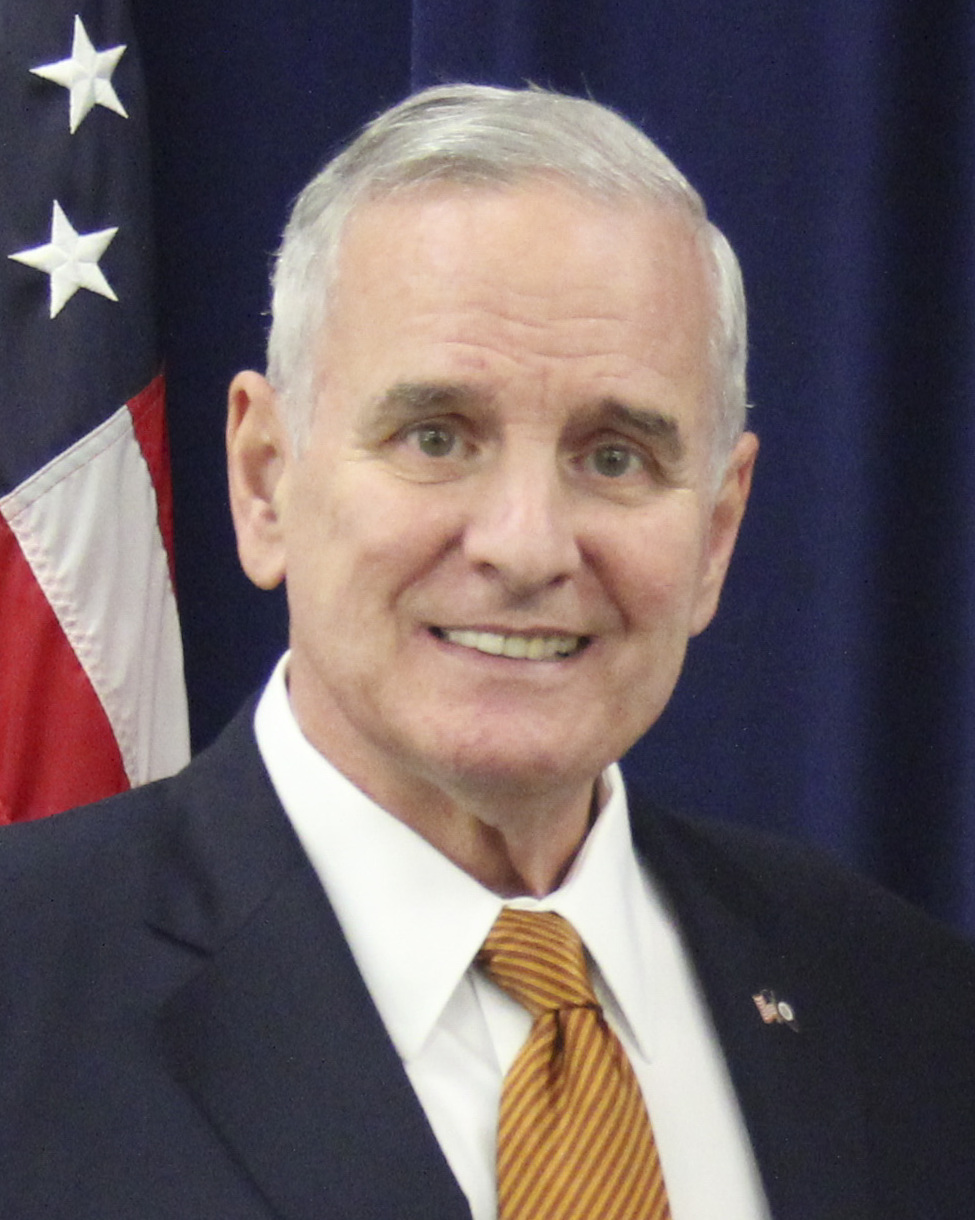
Governor Dayton

=== Dayton administration ===
In 2010, Mark Dayton was elected the first DFL governor since 1991. The primary was competitive, with the DFL-endorsed Margaret Anderson Kelliher losing to Dayton, who was nominated with just 41% of the vote. Dayton also won the general election with only a plurality of votes. Despite winning the governor's office and holding all executive offices, the DFL lost control of the legislature. But Republican rule over the legislature ended when the DFL won a trifecta in 2012. Klobuchar was also reelected to the Senate by a wide margin.

In 2012, the DFL created its annual awards ceremony, the Humphrey-Mondale Awards. Also in 2012, Dayton commemorated the 150th anniversary of the Dakota War of 1862 with a call for reconciliation and repudiation of former governor Alexander Ramsey's position. Flags were flown at half mast for a "Day of Remembrance and Reconciliation in Minnesota". In 2013, Dayton pushed for and won a $2.1 billion tax increase, mostly on the wealthy and cigarettes. He also signed a bill legalizing same-sex marriage in Minnesota, created free, statewide, all-day kindergarten, and financed expansions of the Mayo Clinic, 3M, and the Mall of America. He was reelected in 2014 by a wide margin over Republican nominee Jeff Johnson.

In 2015, the Environmental Caucus was founded. In January 2018, Franken resigned from the Senate amid multiple sexual misconduct allegations against him. Dayton appointed Lieutenant Governor Tina Smith to the seat. Smith was elected to complete Franken's second term that November, and Klobuchar was reelected to a third term.

=== Walz administration ===
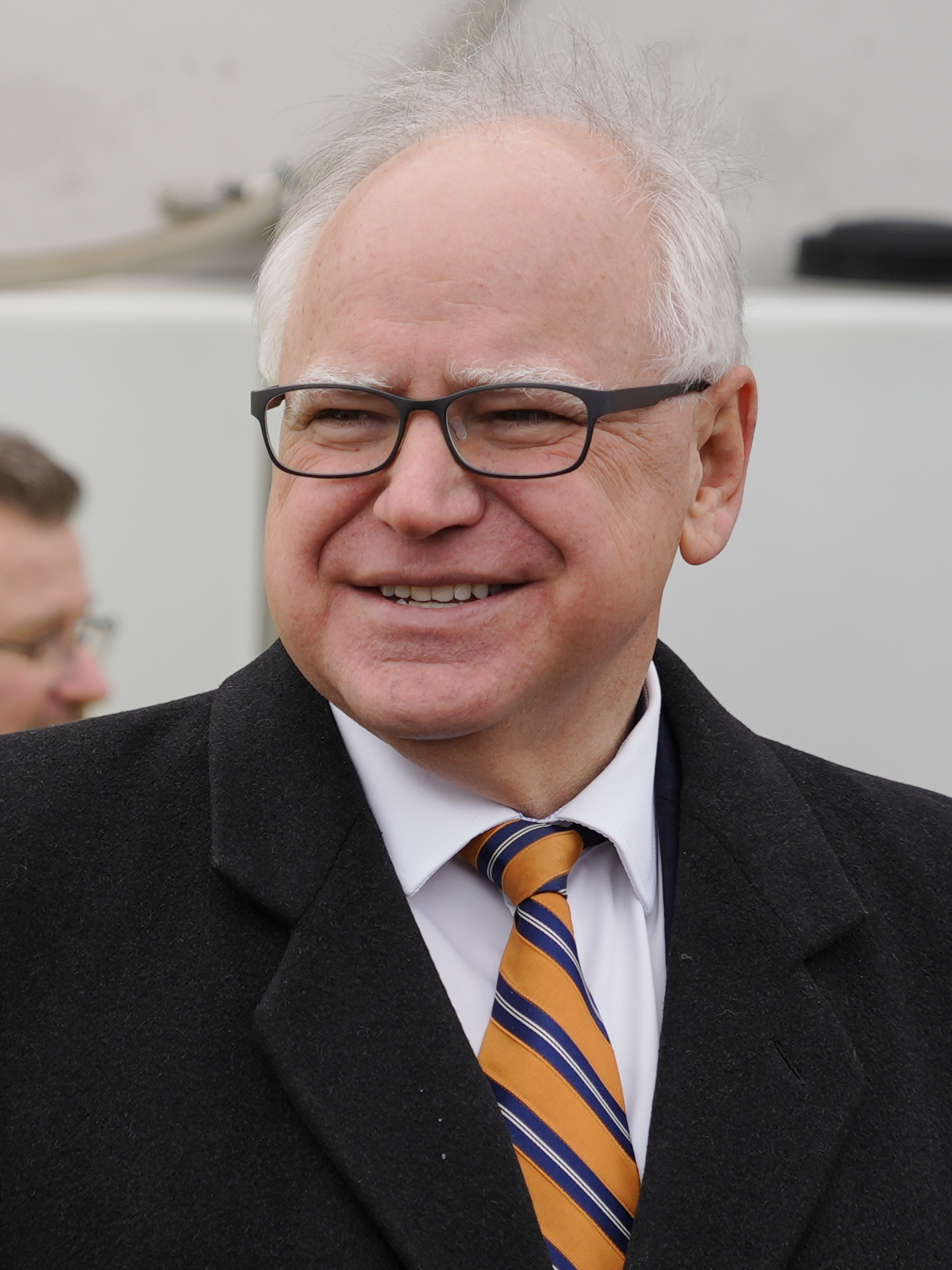
Governor Walz

In 2018, U.S. Representative Tim Walz was elected governor, defeating Republican nominee Jeff Johnson. He was governor during the COVID-19 pandemic and the George Floyd protests in Minneapolis–Saint Paul.

In 2020, Amy Klobuchar ran for president as a moderate. In March, she dropped out of the race and endorsed Joe Biden. Also in 2020, Smith was elected to a six-year Senate term.

After the 2022 Minnesota elections, the DFL became the dominant party, retaining every executive office, winning majorities in the state House and Senate, and reelecting all incumbent members of Congress. With its newly elected trifecta, the DFL pursued a progressive agenda in the legislative session. Walz called it "the most successful legislative session, certainly in many of our lifetimes and maybe in Minnesota history." The newly elected government passed large expansions in welfare programs and spending. Notable policies passed include the expansion of abortion rights, new programs to provide reproductive healthcare, protection of gender-affirming care, legalization of recreational cannabis, indexing education spending to inflation, investments in public transit, and paid sick leave. Former president Barack Obama said: "Minnesota has made progress on a whole host of issues—from protecting abortion rights and new gun safety measures to expanding access to the ballot and reducing child poverty. These laws will make a real difference in the lives of Minnesotans." Leading the legislative effort was Speaker Melissa Hortman.

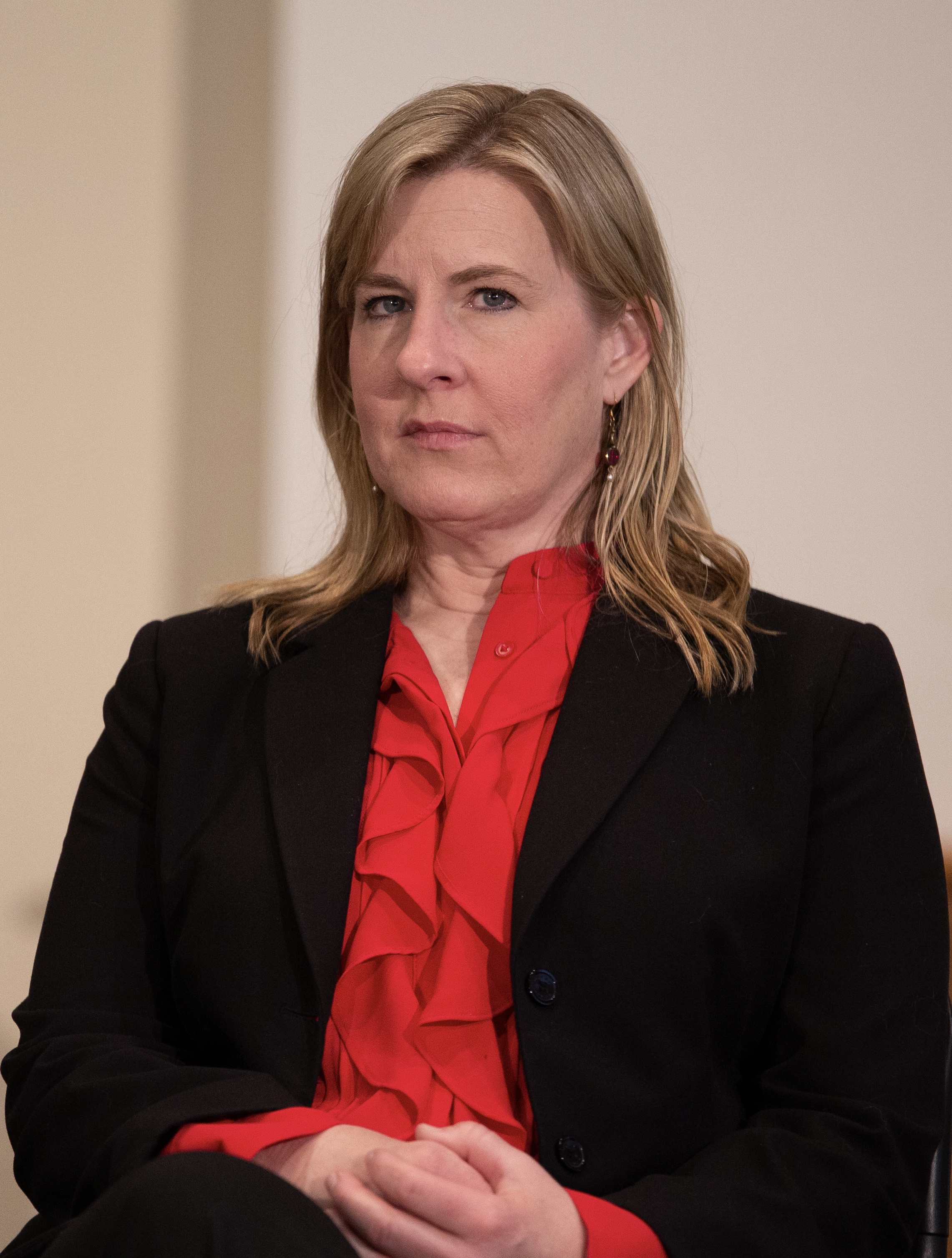
Speaker Hortman

In 2023, U.S. Representative Dean Phillips of Minnesota's 3rd congressional district announced a primary campaign for the Democratic nomination for president. He did not have the DFL leadership's support. Asked about the campaign, Walz replied, "It's not going to be relevant, and we'll just move on."

In 2024, Kamala Harris chose Walz as her running mate during her unsuccessful campaign for president.

Klobuchar was reelected to a fourth term in 2024, but the state DFL trifecta was broken with a split legislature after the 2024 Minnesota elections. From January 2025 until early February, Hortman led a boycott of House sessions to deny Republicans a quorum to conduct business. As part of an eventual power-sharing agreement, the Republicans elected the Speaker of the House, while Hortman held the newly created title "DFL Caucus Leader". Hortman and her husband were assassinated only three months after she assumed the title. Another DFL leader, State Senator John Hoffman, was also shot, but survived. Hortman's successor as DFL Caucus Leader is Zack Stephenson.

In 2025, Walz announced his candidacy for a third term, but later dropped out of the race to focus on the ongoing investigations into and backlash against his handling of the 2020s Minnesota fraud scandals. His successor will be chosen in the 2026 Minnesota gubernatorial election. The DFL nominated Klobuchar for governor with 89.7% of the vote over Kobey Layne, a left-wing challenger. Tina Smith is not seeking reelection in 2026; her successor will be chosen in the 2026 United States Senate election in Minnesota. The DFL nominated Walz's lieutenant governor, Peggy Flanagan, to succeed Smith. Flanagan, a progressive, defeated the moderate congresswoman Angie Craig in the primary with 59% of the vote.

In the November general election, the entire statewide ticket was elected. The newly elected officials are scheduled to take office on January 4, 2027.

== See also ==
- History of the Democratic Party (United States)
- History of Minnesota
- Politics of Minnesota
