= 1952 Minnesota gubernatorial election =

- November 4, 1952
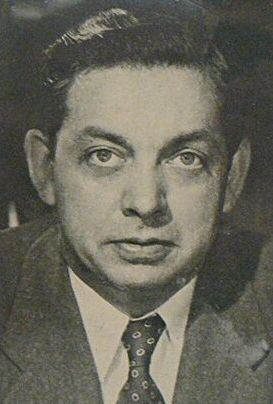

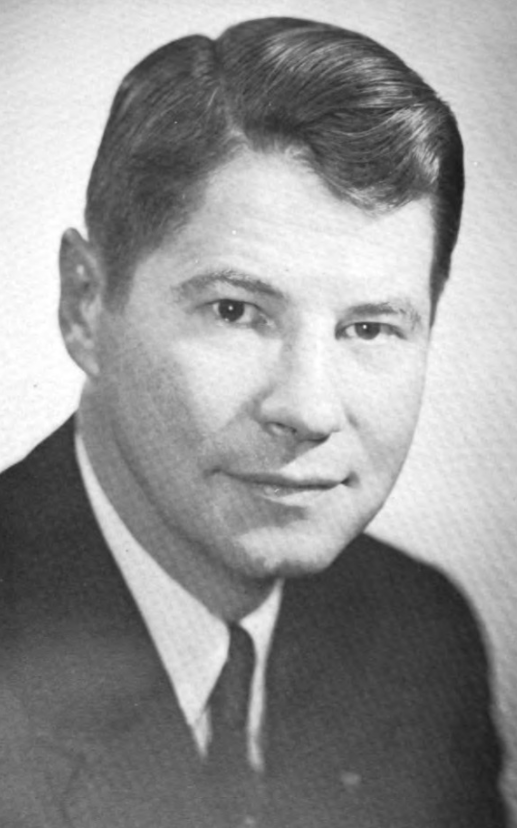
Nominee	C. Elmer Anderson	Orville Freeman
Party	Republican	Democratic (DFL)
Popular vote	785,125	624,480
Percentage	55.33%	44.01%
- County results Anderson: 40–50% 50–60% 60–70% 70–80% Freeman: 40–50% 50–60% 60–70%
Governor before election
C. Elmer Anderson
Republican
Elected Governor
C. Elmer Anderson
Republican

The 1952 Minnesota gubernatorial election took place on November 4, 1952. Republican incumbent C. Elmer Anderson defeated Minnesota Democratic–Farmer–Labor Party challenger Orville Freeman. At this point, it was the eighth consecutive Minnesota gubernatorial election won by the Republican Party.

C. Elmer Anderson became governor in 1951 after the resignation of Luther Youngdahl to become a federal judge. Anderson was running to be elected in his own right.

== Republican primary ==
Anderson was nominated. Sigrid Schmidt was the first Republican woman to run for governor, and the second woman in general. Mabel Caroline Wiesner, a DFLer, was the first woman to run, in 1944. Schmidt campaigned against water fluoridation, and claimed to have contact with extraterrestrials.

=== Candidates ===
==== Nominated ====
- C. Elmer Anderson, incumbent

=== Eliminated in primary ===
- Paul Indykiewicz, welder
- Stafford King, state auditor
- John C. Peterson, painter
- Sigrid Schmidt, homemaker
- August Scramstad, railroad tower worker

=== Results ===
Republican Party of Minnesota primary results
Party	Candidate	Votes	%
Republican	C. Elmer Anderson	276,677	70.42%
Republican	Stafford King	102,823	26.17%
Republican	John C. Peterson	6,283	1.60%
Republican	Sigrid Schmidt	3,165	0.81%
Republican	August Scramstad	1,979	0.50%
Republican	Paul Indykiewicz	1,967	0.50%
Total votes		392,894	100%

== Democratic-Farmer-Labor primary ==
Freeman was nominated, defeating Ryan in a landslide.

=== Candidates ===
==== Nominated ====
- Orville Freeman, DFL party chairman

=== Eliminated in primary ===
- Ed Ryan, Hennepin County sheriff

=== Results ===
Democratic-Farmer-Labor primary results
Party	Candidate	Votes	%
Democratic (DFL)	Orville Freeman	173,946	71.14%
Democratic (DFL)	Ed Ryan	70,571	28.86%
Total votes		244,517	100%

== Candidates ==
- C. Elmer Anderson, incumbent (Republican)
- Eldrid Bauers, stationary engineer (Industrial Government)
- Martin Fredrickson, farmer (Progressive)
- Orville Freeman, DFL chairman (DFL)

== Campaigns ==
In September, Freeman challenged Anderson to a debate. Anderson declined, stating that his campaign schedule was already set and it was too late in the campaign to change it. If the debate had happened, it would have been the first gubernatorial debate in Minnesota.

Freeman's campaign was mostly based on Anderson's lack of active campaigning. Freeman responded with extensive and details policy plans. His policy programs were called "Freeman Programs", and included increasing aid to schools so $100 was invested in every student, removing limits on old-age pension and providing housing to those of a needy age, conducting a survey of all industry in the state and send the results to universities so new industry could be developed from existing infrastructure, establishing a well-planned forestry and reforestation program, and creating a public health program to help those with debilitating physical injuries and disabilities adjust into society.

=== Polling ===
Poll source	Date(s) administered	Sample size	Margin of error	Orville Freeman (DFL)	C. Elmer Anderson (R)
St. Paul Pioneer Press	October 12, 1952	(Note: The total number of votes was not reported.)	–	31.4%	68.6%

== Results ==
1952 gubernatorial election, Minnesota
Party	Candidate	Votes	%	±%
Republican	C. Elmer Anderson (incumbent)	785,125	55.33%	−5.41%
Democratic (DFL)	Orville Freeman	624,480	44.01%	+5.73%
Progressive	Martin Fredrickson	5,227	0.36%	n/a
Industrial Government	Eldrid Bauers	4,037	0.28%	−0.69%
Majority		160,645	11.32%	
Turnout		1,418,869		
Republican hold		Swing		

=== Aftermath ===
Despite Anderson's comfortable margin of victory, matching the results of the concurrent presidential election, the result was nowhere as decisive as polling had suggested and was actually an underperformance compared to his predecessor's two years prior. Anderson's opponent, Orville Freeman, would challenge him again in 1954 and win an upset victory to become the state's first governor from the Democratic-Farmer-Labor party, as well as the first Democratic governor since 1936: Freeman also won in 1956 and 1958, but fell short in 1960. Freeman was compensated for this by the ascendant president Kennedy, who nominated him for the position of Secretary of Agriculture.

== See also ==
- List of Minnesota gubernatorial elections
