= George MacKinnon =

American judge

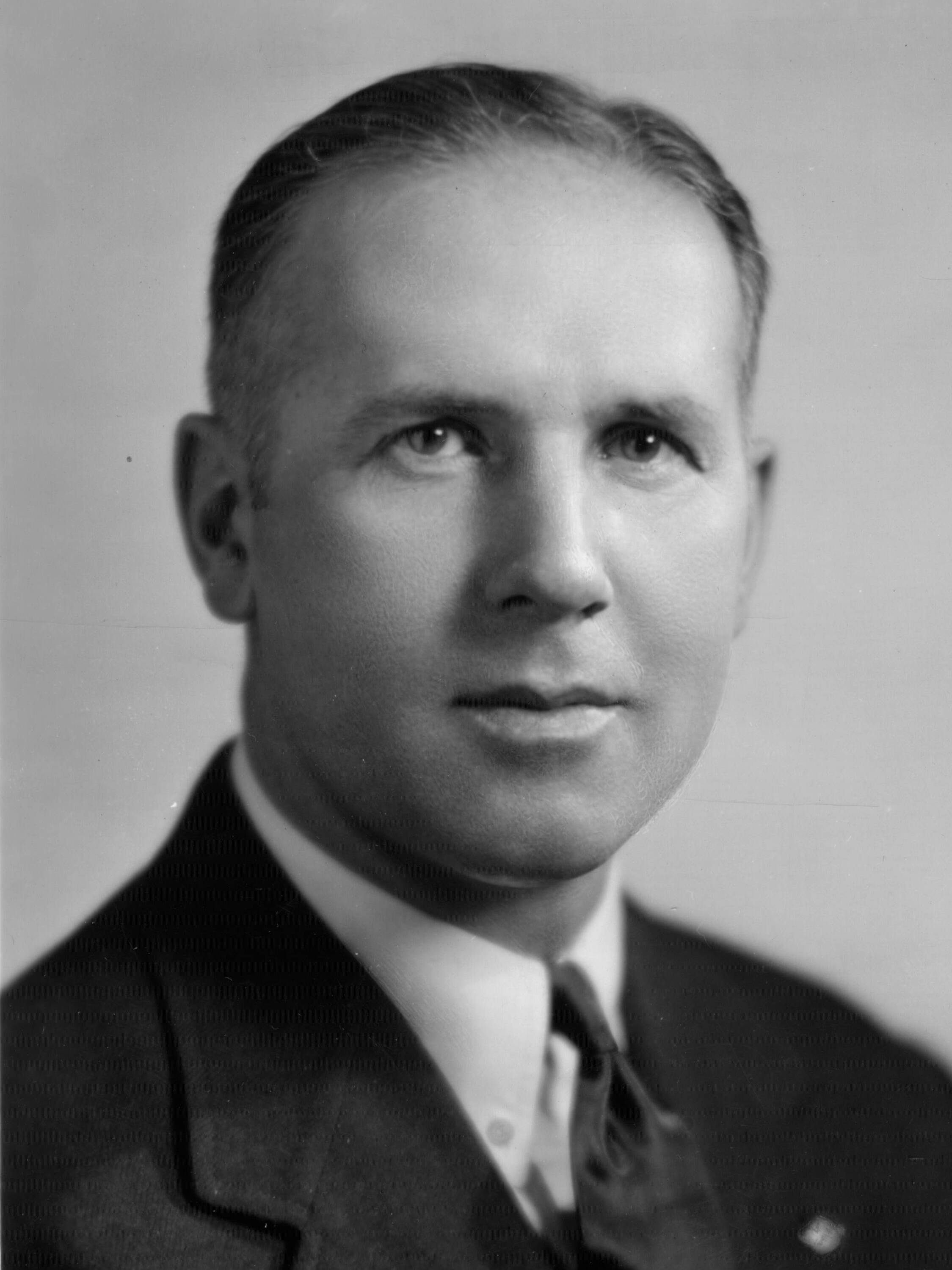
- MacKinnon in 1946

Senior Judge of the United States Court of Appeals for the District of Columbia Circuit
- In office May 20, 1983 – May 1, 1995

Judge of the United States Foreign Intelligence Surveillance Court of Review
- In office May 19, 1979 – May 18, 1982
- Preceded by: Seat established
- Succeeded by: John A. Field Jr.

Judge of the United States Court of Appeals for the District of Columbia Circuit
- In office May 6, 1969 – May 20, 1983
- Appointed by: Richard Nixon
- Preceded by: Charles Fahy
- Succeeded by: Ken Starr

United States Attorney for the District of Minnesota
- In office 1953–1958
- Appointed by: Dwight D. Eisenhower
- Preceded by: Fallon Kelly
- Succeeded by: Philip Neville

Member of the U.S. House of Representatives from Minnesota's 3rd district
- In office January 3, 1947 – January 3, 1949
- Preceded by: William Gallagher
- Succeeded by: Roy Wier

Member of the Minnesota House of Representatives from the 29th district
- In office January 8, 1935 – January 4, 1943
- Preceded by: Burton Kingsley
- Succeeded by: Carl Wegner

Personal details
- Born: George Edwards MacKinnon; April 22, 1906 Saint Paul, Minnesota, U.S.
- Died: May 1, 1995 (aged 89) Potomac, Maryland, U.S.
- Party: Republican
- Education: University of Minnesota (LLB)

George Edward MacKinnon (April 22, 1906 – May 1, 1995) was an American politician, attorney, and judge who served as a United States representative and United States Attorney for Minnesota, and as a United States circuit judge of the United States Court of Appeals for the District of Columbia. He was the father of feminist legal scholar Catharine MacKinnon.

== Education and career ==
Born in Saint Paul, Minnesota, MacKinnon received a Bachelor of Laws from University of Minnesota Law School in 1929. MacKinnon was a member of the editorial board of the Minnesota Law Review and played as a center on the Golden Gophers football team. MacKinnon was also an All-American javelin thrower for the Minnesota Golden Gophers track and field team, finishing 5th at the 1928 NCAA Track and Field Championships. He was an assistant counsel for Investors Syndicate (now a component of Ameriprise Financial) of Minneapolis, Minnesota from 1929 to 1942. He was a member of the Minnesota House of Representatives from 1935 to 1942. He was in the United States Navy as a Commander from 1942 to 1946.

MacKinnon was elected as a Republican to serve as a United States representative for the Third District of Minnesota to the 80th congress (January 3, 1947 – January 3, 1949), but was defeated when he sought re-election. The Republican district was interrupted for a term in 1936 by a Farmer-Labor Party representative and in 1944 by a Democrat who died in 1946. MacKinnon reclaimed it for the Republican Party only to yield it in two years to the Democratic-Farmer-Labor Party candidate he defeated in 1946, who then served until 1961. MacKinnon’s one term in the House was notable for his persistence in accusing members of the Truman Administration for insider trading on commodity futures. He served on the Education and Labor Committee.

He was in private practice of law in Minneapolis from 1949 to 1953. He was the United States Attorney for the District of Minnesota from 1953 to 1958. In 1958, he ran as the Republican nominee for governor of Minnesota and lost the general election to Orville Freeman. He was in private practice of law in Minneapolis from 1958 to 1960. He was a Special Assistant United States Attorney General from 1960 to 1961. He was general counsel and vice president for Investors Mutual Funds of Minneapolis from 1961 to 1969.

=== Notable cases ===
During his service as United States attorney, MacKinnon successfully prosecuted the first labor case under the Taft-Hartley Act against Archer Daniels Midland, Gerald Connelly, and Sidney Brennan in United States v. Gerald Connelly. During his service as Special Assistant United States Attorney General in 1960, MacKinnon focused on labor racketeering investigations involving James Hoffa. MacKinnon started the Test Fleet investigation that led to James Hoffa's conviction for perjury.

== Federal judicial service ==
MacKinnon was nominated by President Richard Nixon on April 23, 1969, to a seat on the United States Court of Appeals for the District of Columbia Circuit vacated by Judge Charles Fahy. He was confirmed by the United States Senate on May 5, 1969, and received his commission on May 6, 1969. He served as a Judge of the United States Foreign Intelligence Surveillance Court of Review from 1979 to 1982. He served on the United States Sentencing Commission from 1985 to 1991. He assumed senior status on May 20, 1983. His service was terminated on May 1, 1995, due to his death in Potomac, Maryland.

== Philosophy ==
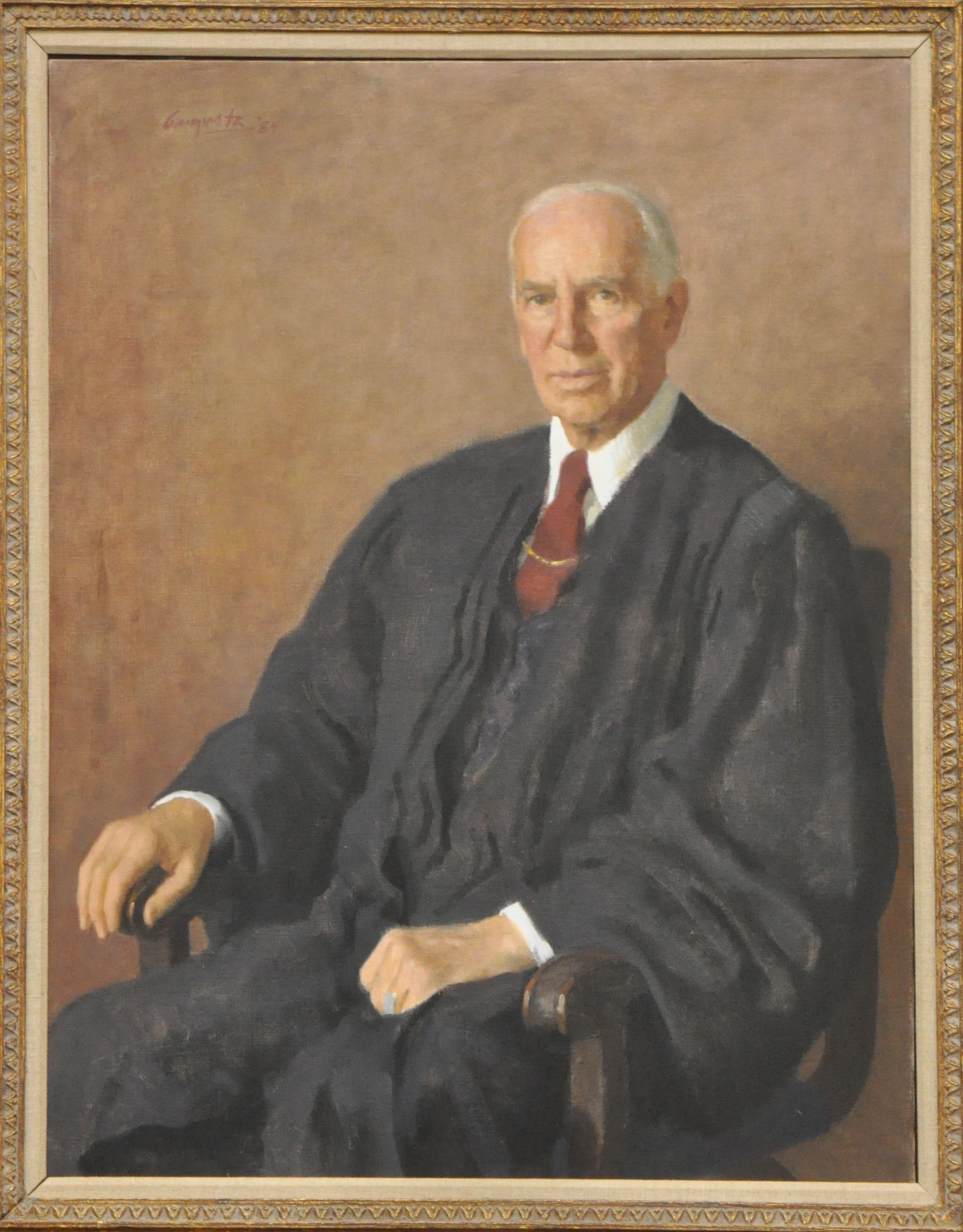
Portrait of MacKinnon as a United States Circuit Judge in 1984.

MacKinnon was also known as a conservative and once described as "so far right he makes Goldwater look like George McGovern," although this may have been hyperbole. According to Judge Harry T. Edwards, Judge MacKinnon was "a real character: he was someone who was not easily dissuaded from his positions, who always aimed to get his way, and, yet, who always enjoyed his colleagues and fostered collegiality on the court." Chief Justice Warren E. Burger, a fellow Minnesotan who appointed MacKinnon to the United States Sentencing Commission and the special court division that selected independent counsel, said, "He's a man who can't be frightened or pushed by anybody" when describing him. Thomas J. Campbell, who once worked as a clerk for Judge MacKinnon, has written:

Judge MacKinnon inspired by words. He inspired by his life's deeds. But he inspired most of all by what came to him, naturally. That he'd always introduce himself as George, not Judge. That he would call his wife on his private phone line, so that the government would not have to pay whatever marginal cost one phone call might represent. That he would answer his own phone with such alacrity that clerk or secretary would have to scramble to pick it up on the first ring. That he presided at the marriage, in chambers, of a man he had once prosecuted, convicted, and sent away to prison as U.S. Attorney. That he was loved by Democrats and Republicans, liberals and conservatives, and sought the approval of neither to find his own sense of worth.

U.S. House of Representatives
Preceded by William Gallagher	Member of the United States House of Representatives from Minnesota's 3rd congressional district 1947–1949	Succeeded by Roy Wier
Party political offices
Preceded by Ancher Nelsen	Republican nominee for Governor of Minnesota; 1958	Succeeded by Elmer L. Andersen
Legal offices
Preceded by Charles Fahy	Judge of the United States Court of Appeals for the District of Columbia Circuit; 1969–1983	Succeeded by Ken Starr
Preceded by Seat established	Judge of the United States Foreign Intelligence Surveillance Court of Review; 1979–1982	Succeeded by John A. Field Jr.
