= Donald O. Wright =

American politician

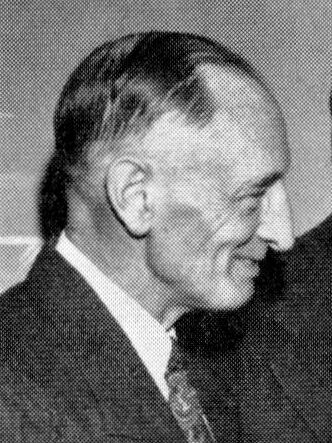
- Wright in 1951

35th Lieutenant Governor of Minnesota
- In office September 3, 1954 – January 3, 1955
- Governor: C. Elmer Anderson
- Preceded by: Ancher Nelsen
- Succeeded by: Karl Rolvaag

Personal details
- Born: November 18, 1892 Minneapolis, Minnesota, U.S.
- Died: July 24, 1985 (aged 92) St. Louis Park, Minnesota, U.S.
- Party: Republican
- Spouse: Verna A. Wood
- Profession: politician

Donald Orr Wright Sr. (November 18, 1892 – July 24, 1985) was a United States Republican politician from the state of Minnesota. He served in the state legislature for eight years and the Minnesota State Senate for 35 years. He was President pro Tempore of the 58th Legislative Session (1953-1954).

Wright attended the University of Minnesota and was a member of Tau Kappa Epsilon fraternity.

Wright led the Senate's tax committee for many years and was instrumental in the state instituting its civil service system.

Following Ancher Nelsen's 1953 resignation as Lieutenant Governor of Minnesota, Wright assumed that office and held it for the remainder of the term, serving with Governor C. Elmer Anderson. Wright served in that role from September 1954 until January 1955; however, the Senate did not meet in session during that period.

Political offices
Preceded by Ancher Nelsen	Lieutenant Governor of Minnesota; 1953–1955	Succeeded by Karl Rolvaag
