= 1946 Minnesota lieutenant gubernatorial election =

Minnesota lieutenant gubernatorial election, 1946
- November 5, 1946
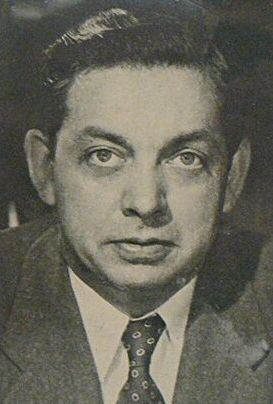

Nominee	C. Elmer Anderson	Frank McGinn
Party	Republican	Democratic (DFL)
Popular vote	524,109	332,733
Percentage	61.17%	38.83%
- County results Anderson: 50–60% 60–70% 70–80% 80–90% McGinn: 50–60%
Lieutenant Governor before election
C. Elmer Anderson
Republican
Elected Lieutenant Governor
C. Elmer Anderson
Republican

The 1946 Minnesota lieutenant gubernatorial election took place on November 5, 1946. Incumbent Lieutenant Governor C. Elmer Anderson of the Republican Party of Minnesota defeated Minnesota Democratic-Farmer-Labor Party challenger Frank McGinn.

== Results ==
1946 lieutenant gubernatorial election, Minnesota
Party	Candidate	Votes	%	±%
Republican	C. Elmer Anderson (incumbent)	524,109	61.17%	+3.05%
Democratic (DFL)	Frank McGinn	332,733	38.83%	−3.05%
Majority		191,376	22.34%	
Turnout		856,842		
Republican hold		Swing		
