= Bruce G. Nelsen =

American politician (born 1935)

Bruce G. Nelsen (born March 22, 1935) was an American politician and educator.

Nelsen lived in Staples, Minnesota with his wife and family. His father was Ancher Nelsen who served in the Minnesota Senate and in the United States House of Representatives. Nelson went to the Staples Area Vocational Technical Institute in Staples, Minnesota, University of Maryland, and University of Minnesota. He was a machine shop instructor at the Staples Area Vocational Technical Institute. Nelsen served in the Minnesota House of Representatives from 1974 to 1982 and was a Republican.
