= 1948 Minnesota lieutenant gubernatorial election =

Minnesota lieutenant gubernatorial election, 1948
- November 2, 1948
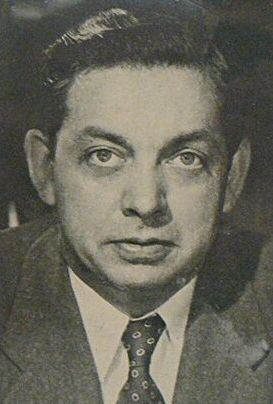

Nominee	C. Elmer Anderson	John T. McDonough
Party	Republican	Democratic (DFL)
Popular vote	591,208	562,422
Percentage	50.48%	48.03%
- County results Anderson: 40–50% 50–60% 60–70% 70–80% McDonough: 40–50% 50–60% 60–70%
Lieutenant Governor before election
C. Elmer Anderson
Republican
Elected Lieutenant Governor
C. Elmer Anderson
Republican

The 1948 Minnesota lieutenant gubernatorial election took place on November 2, 1948. Incumbent Lieutenant Governor C. Elmer Anderson of the Republican Party of Minnesota defeated Minnesota Democratic-Farmer-Labor Party challenger John T. McDonough.

== Results ==
1948 lieutenant gubernatorial election, Minnesota
Party	Candidate	Votes	%	±%
Republican	C. Elmer Anderson (incumbent)	591,208	50.48%	−10.69%
Democratic (DFL)	John T. McDonough	562,422	48.03%	+9.20%
Progressive	Robert W. Duel	17,448	1.49%	n/a
Majority		28,786	2.45%	
Turnout		1,171,078		
Republican hold		Swing		
