= 1940 Minnesota lieutenant gubernatorial election =

Minnesota lieutenant gubernatorial election, 1940
- November 5, 1940
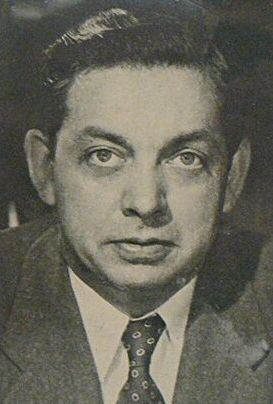

| Nominee | C. Elmer Anderson | Howard Y. Williams | Frank Patrick Ryan |
| Party | Republican | Farmer–Labor | Democratic |
| Popular vote | 598,369 | 305,418 | 265,793 |
| Percentage | 51.16% | 26.11% | 22.73% |
- County results Anderson: 30–40% 40–50% 50–60% 60–70% 70–80% Williams: 40–50% Ryan: 30–40%
Lieutenant Governor before election
C. Elmer Anderson
Republican
Elected Lieutenant Governor
C. Elmer Anderson
Republican

The 1940 Minnesota lieutenant gubernatorial election took place on November 5, 1940. Incumbent Lieutenant Governor C. Elmer Anderson of the Republican Party of Minnesota defeated Minnesota Farmer–Labor Party challenger Howard Y. Williams and Minnesota Democratic Party candidate Frank Patrick Ryan.

== Results ==
1940 Lieutenant Gubernatorial Election, Minnesota
| Party | Candidate | Votes | % | ±% |
|---|---|---|---|---|
| Republican | C. Elmer Anderson (incumbent) | 598,369 | 51.16% | −3.58% |
| Farmer–Labor | Howard Y. Williams | 305,418 | 26.11% | −8.62% |
| Democratic | Frank Patrick Ryan | 265,793 | 22.73% | +12.21% |
| Majority | | 292,951 | 25.05% | |
| Turnout | | 1,169,580 | | |
| Republican hold | | Swing | | |
