= 1958 Minnesota gubernatorial election =

- November 4, 1958
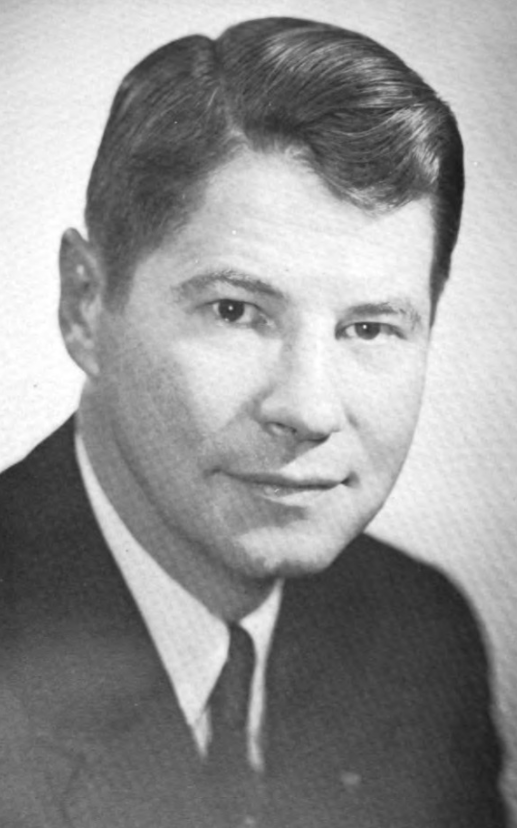

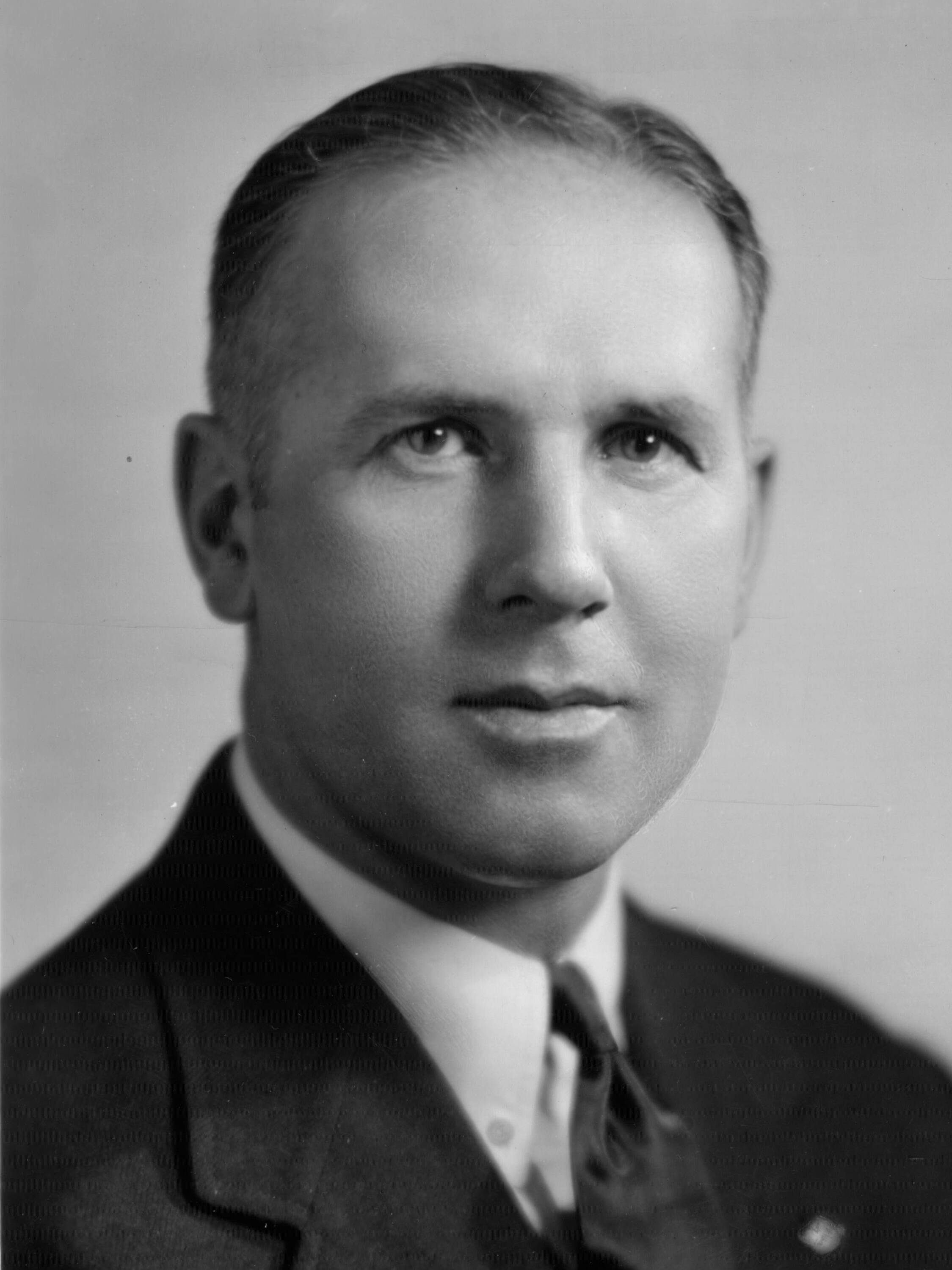
Nominee	Orville Freeman	George MacKinnon
Party	Democratic (DFL)	Republican
Popular vote	658,326	490,731
Percentage	56.76%	42.31%
- County results Freeman: 40–50% 50–60% 60–70% 70–80% MacKinnon: 40–50% 50–60% 60–70%
Governor before election
Orville Freeman
Democratic (DFL)
Elected Governor
Orville Freeman
Democratic (DFL)

The 1958 Minnesota gubernatorial election took place on November 4, 1958. Incumbent Minnesota Democratic–Farmer–Labor Party (DFL) Orville Freeman defeated Republican challenger George MacKinnon.

== Democratic-Farmer-Labor primary ==
Freeman was renominated.

=== Candidates ===
==== Nominated ====
- Orville Freeman, incumbent

==== Eliminated in primary ====
- Harold Strom, president of Home Construction Inc.

=== Results ===
Democratic-Farmer-Labor primary results
Party	Candidate	Votes	%
Democratic (DFL)	Orville Freeman	331,822	87.58%
Democratic (DFL)	Harold Strom	47,041	12.42%
Total votes		378,863	100%

== Republican primary ==
1956 nominee Ancher Nelsen ran, intending for a rematch with Freeman. He was the frontrunner for the nomination, but dropped out of the race once MacKinnon entered. This left M. Wayne Field as the only opposition to MacKinnon. Field dropped out, and was replaced by Glenn B. Brown opposing MacKinnon. MacKinnon would be victorious in a landslide.

=== Candidates ===
==== Nominated ====
- George MacKinnon, United States attorney for the District of Minnesota

==== Eliminated in primary ====
- Glenn B. Brown, electrician

=== Results ===
Republican primary results
Party	Candidate	Votes	%
Republican	George MacKinnon	202,241	85.29%
Republican	Glenn B. Brown	34,878	14.71%
Total votes		378,863	100%

== General election ==
=== Candidates ===
- Arne Anderson, carpenter (Industrial Government)
- Orville Freeman, tincumbent (DFL)
- George MacKinnon, United States attorney for the District of Minnesota (Republican)

=== Endorsements ===
George MacKinnon (R)

U.S. senators

- Edward J. Thye, former U.S. senator from Minnesota

=== Campaigns ===
MacKinnon claimed that Freeman was diverting attention from his failure to take action against the Kid Cann liquor syndicate. MacKinnon attacked the DFL-led state government as "irresponsible legislative antics". After the DFL supported the repeal of a 1951 law banning government workers from striking, MacKinnon claimed this as evidence that the DFL was a "radical left-wing party", and cited Franklin D. Roosevelt's opposition to the repealing of such laws.

Freeman did little campaigning, which Mackinnon used as a talking point against Freeman. Freeman had used the same talking point while campaigning against incumbent C. Elmer Anderson in 1954.

== Results ==
1958 gubernatorial election, Minnesota
Party	Candidate	Votes	%	±%
Democratic (DFL)	Orville Freeman (incumbent)	658,326	56.76%	+5.34%
Republican	George MacKinnon	490,731	42.31%	−5.87%
Industrial Government	Arne Anderson	10,858	0.94%	+0.53%
Majority		167,595	14.45%	
Turnout		1,159,915		
Democratic (DFL) hold		Swing		

== See also ==
- List of Minnesota gubernatorial elections
