= 1952 Minnesota lieutenant gubernatorial election =

- November 5, 1952
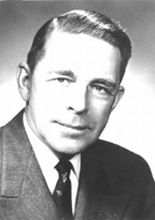

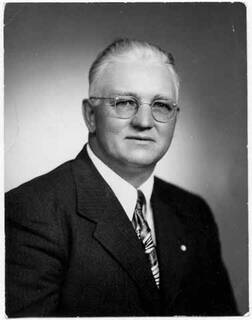
Nominee	Ancher Nelsen	Arthur Hansen
Party	Republican	Democratic (DFL)
Popular vote	730,971	615,186
Percentage	54.3%	45.7%
- County results Nelson: 50–60% 60–70% 70–80% Hansen: 50–60% 60–70%
Lieutenant Governor before election
Vacant
Elected Lieutenant Governor
Ancher Nelsen
Republican

The 1952 Minnesota lieutenant gubernatorial election took place on November 5, 1952. Republican Party of Minnesota candidate Ancher Nelsen defeated Minnesota Democratic-Farmer-Labor Party challenger Arthur Hansen.

== Results ==
1952 lieutenant gubernatorial election, Minnesota
Party	Candidate	Votes	%	±%
Republican	Ancher Nelsen	730,971	54.30%	−4.05%
Democratic (DFL)	Arthur Hansen	615,186	45.70%	+5.94%
Majority		115,785	8.60%	
Turnout		1,346,157		
Republican hold		Swing		
