= Joseph P. O'Hara =

American politician (1895–1975)

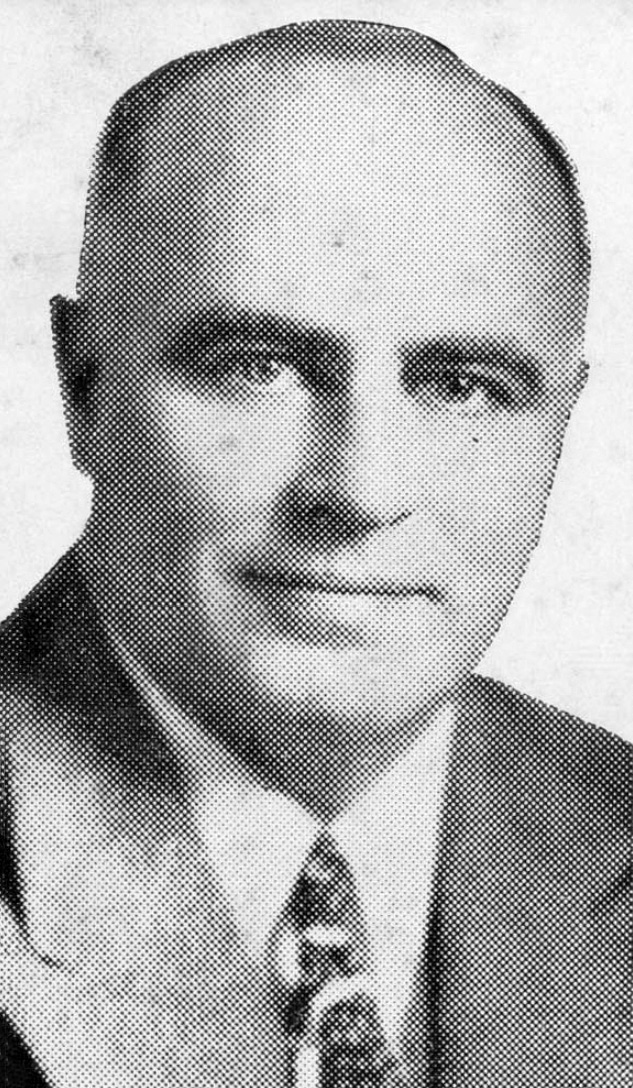
- O'Hara, c. 1940

Member of the U.S. House of Representatives from Minnesota's 2nd district
- In office January 3, 1941 – January 3, 1959
- Preceded by: Elmer Ryan
- Succeeded by: Ancher Nelsen

Personal details
- Born: January 23, 1895 Tipton, Iowa, U.S.
- Died: March 4, 1975 (aged 80) Bethesda, Maryland, U.S.
- Party: Republican

Joseph Patrick O'Hara (January 23, 1895 – March 4, 1975) was a U.S. representative from Minnesota.

== Early life ==
O'Hara was born in Tipton, Cedar County, Iowa, on January 23, 1895. He attended the public schools and graduated from Spirit Lake, Iowa, High School. During the First World War, he was commissioned as a second lieutenant of the Infantry in the Officers’ Reserve Corps and later promoted to captain in the Quartermaster Corps, serving from May 13, 1917, to August 15, 1919. With overseas service, he was commissioned as a major of Infantry in the Reserve Corps.

O'Hara also attended Inns of Court, London, England, and graduated from the law department of University of Notre Dame, South Bend, Indiana. In 1920, he was admitted to the bar in 1921, and was commenced practice in Glencoe, Minnesota.

== Careers ==
O'Hara served as an attorney for various villages, cities, towns, and school districts, as well as county attorney of McLeod County (1934 – 1938).

He was then elected as a Republican to the 77th, 78th, 79th, 80th, 81st, 82nd, 83rd, 84th and the 85th congresses on January 3, 1941 – January 3, 1959.

=== World War II ===
O'Hara was an outspoken ally of Charles Lindbergh, and was an avowed isolationist. This was considered particularly egregious at the time because this was after the fall of France and before Hitler's invasion of the Soviet Union, and at that time Britain was very much alone. After an especially contentious argument outside of congress over a bill titled H.R. 1776 (which provided funding for the British military in early 1941), E. Eugene Cox, Stephen Pace, Paul Brown, Albert Sidney Camp, Carl Vinson, Sam Hobbs, Pete Jarman, Henry B. Steagall, George M. Grant, Frank W. Boykin, L. Mendel Rivers, James P. Richards, Hampton P. Fulmer, Herbert Covington Bonner and John L. McMillan all denounced O'Hara to the press. All 15 of the aforementioned southern representatives attacked O'Hara personally when speaking to the media. Richards said that O'Hara's "lack of manhood was only surpassed by his lack of sense." George M. Grant called O'Hara "two-faced and gutless." Hery B Steagall said it was "unfortunate that Mr. O'Hara has no sense of honor." Herbert Covington Bonner called him "unmanly and shameful." Hampton P. Fulmer said O'Hara was "nothing but a damned fool." Peter Jarman said that "When Hitler says jump, Mr. O'Hara asks How High?." When asked "Do you respect Representative O'Hara?", Albert Sidney Camp responded "No!" E. Cox said that it was "a shame, because Joseph O'Hara was a man once."

O'Hara voted against the Civil Rights Act of 1957.

He was not a candidate for reelection in 1958 to the 86th congress, but he resumed the practice of law in Washington, D.C., where he resided. He died in Bethesda, MD, on March 4, 1975. His interment is in Gate of Heaven Cemetery in Silver Spring, Maryland.

== Bibliography ==
- Dodge, Andrew R. (2005). Biographical Directory of the United States Congress: 1774-2005. Washington, D.C.: U.S. Government Printing Office. ISBN 9780160731761.

U.S. House of Representatives
Preceded by Elmer Ryan	U.S. Representative from Minnesota's 2nd congressional district 1941 – 1959	Succeeded by Ancher Nelsen

- United States Congress. "Joseph P. O'Hara (id: O000056)". Biographical Directory of the United States Congress.
