= Ancher Nelsen =

American politician (1904–1992)

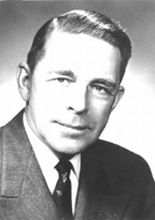

Member of the U.S. House of Representatives from Minnesota's 2nd district
- In office January 3, 1959 – December 31, 1974
- Preceded by: Joseph P. O'Hara
- Succeeded by: Tom Hagedorn

34th Lieutenant Governor of Minnesota
- In office January 5, 1953 – May 1, 1953
- Governor: C. Elmer Anderson
- Preceded by: C. Elmer Anderson
- Succeeded by: Donald O. Wright

Member of the Minnesota Senate
- In office December 2, 1935 – January 1, 1951

Personal details
- Born: October 11, 1904 Buffalo Lake, Minnesota, U.S.
- Died: November 30, 1992 (aged 88) Hutchinson, Minnesota, U.S.
- Party: Republican
- Spouse(s): Ilo Irene Zimmerman (m. 1929; died 1972) Elvern Mildred Krasean (m. 1973)
- Children: 3, Bruce (son)
- Profession: farmer, politician

Ancher Nelsen (October 11, 1904 – November 30, 1992), was an American politician who served as the 34th lieutenant governor of Minnesota and an eight-term congressman.

== Biography ==
Nelsen was born October 11, 1904, near Buffalo Lake, Minnesota, to Danish parents. He attended elementary school in Brownton, Minnesota, and graduated from Brownton High School in 1923. In 1924 he began operation of his 280-acre diversified farm at Hutchinson, McLeod County, Minnesota. In 1929 he married Ilo Irene Zimmerman of Brownton; they had three children. Their son Bruce G. Nelsen served in the Minnesota House of Representatives.

He served on the District 75 Minnesota School Board from 1926 to 1935 and on the Lynn Township School Board from 1929 to 1935. Nelsen was a member of the Minnesota Senate from 1935 to 1951, and a delegate to the 1948 and 1952 Republican National Conventions. In 1952, he was elected the 34th Lieutenant Governor of Minnesota, but served less than one year (January 5 – May 1, 1953). He resigned to become administrator of the Rural Electrification Administration Program, in Washington, D.C., serving in that post from 1953 to 1956.

In 1956, Nelsen ran for Governor of Minnesota, challenging Orville Freeman. Nelsen was the first gubernatorial candidate to appear on television during his campaign. Prior to official results, Nelsen was expected to win the election. Nelsen would lose by only three points.

Nelsen was elected as a Republican to the U.S. House of Representatives in 1958 and served in the 86th through the 93rd Congresses, from January 3, 1959, to his resignation December 31, 1974, three days before his final term expired. He did not seek renomination in 1974.

Nelsen voted in favor of the Civil Rights Acts of 1960, 1964, and 1968, as well as the 24th Amendment to the U.S. Constitution and the Voting Rights Act of 1965.

He died in Hutchinson, Minnesota, November 30, 1992, at age 88, and is buried in Oakland Cemetery in Hutchinson.

Party political offices
Preceded by C. Elmer Anderson	Republican nominee for Lieutenant Governor of Minnesota; 1952	Succeeded by P. Kenneth Peterson
Preceded by C. Elmer Anderson	Republican nominee for Governor of Minnesota; 1956	Succeeded by George MacKinnon
Political offices
Preceded by C. Elmer Anderson	Lieutenant Governor of Minnesota; 1953	Succeeded by Donald O. Wright
U.S. House of Representatives
Preceded by Joseph P. O'Hara	U.S. Representative from Minnesota's 2nd congressional district 1959–1974	Succeeded by Tom Hagedorn
