= 1944 Minnesota lieutenant gubernatorial election =

Minnesota lieutenant gubernatorial election, 1944
- November 7, 1944
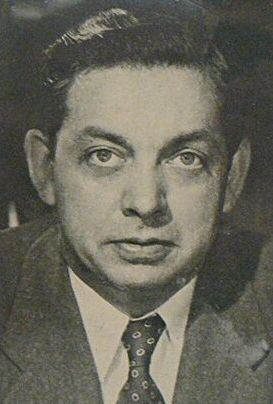

Nominee	C. Elmer Anderson	Frank Murphy
Party	Republican	Democratic (DFL)
Popular vote	641,558	462,222
Percentage	58.12%	41.88%
- County results Anderson: 50–60% 60–70% 70–80% 80–90% Murphy: 50–60% 60–70%
Lieutenant Governor before election
Archie H. Miller
Republican
Elected Lieutenant Governor
C. Elmer Anderson
Republican

The 1944 Minnesota lieutenant gubernatorial election took place on November 7, 1944. Republican Party of Minnesota candidate C. Elmer Anderson defeated Minnesota Democratic-Farmer-Labor Party challenger Frank Murphy.

== Results ==
1944 Lieutenant Gubernatorial Election, Minnesota
Party	Candidate	Votes	%	±%
Republican	C. Elmer Anderson	641,558	58.12%	+2.47%
Democratic (DFL)	Frank Murphy	462,222	41.88%	−2.47%
Majority		179,336	16.24%	
Turnout		1,103,780		
Republican hold		Swing		
