= 1950 Minnesota Attorney General election =

- November 7, 1950
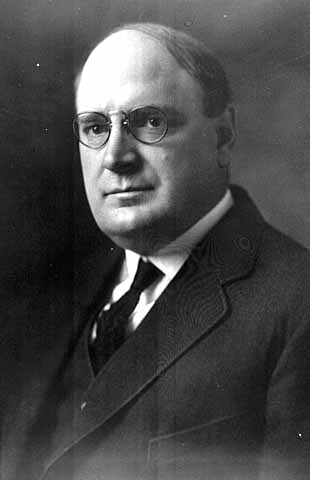

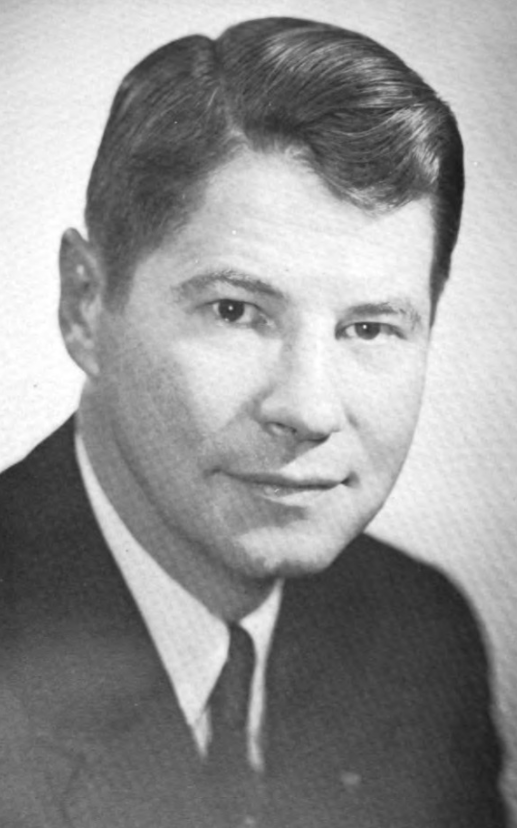
Nominee	Joseph A. A. Burnquist	Orville Freeman
Party	Republican	Democratic (DFL)
Popular vote	575,736	429,320
Percentage	57.28%	42.72%
- County results Burnquist: 50-60% 60-70% 70-80% Freeman: 50-60%
Attorney General before election
Joseph A. A. Burnquist
Republican
Elected Attorney General
Joseph A. A. Burnquist
Republican

The 1950 Minnesota Attorney General election was held on November 7, 1950, in order to elect the attorney general of Minnesota. Republican nominee and incumbent attorney general Joseph A. A. Burnquist defeated Democratic–Farmer–Labor nominee Orville Freeman.

== General election ==
On election day, November 7, 1950, Republican nominee Joseph A. A. Burnquist won re-election by a margin of 146,416 votes against his opponent Democratic–Farmer–Labor nominee Orville Freeman, thereby retaining Republican control over the office of attorney general. Burnquist was sworn in for his seventh term on January 8, 1951.

=== Results ===
Minnesota Attorney General election, 1950
Party	Candidate	Votes	%
Republican	Joseph A. A. Burnquist (incumbent)	575,736	57.28
Democratic (DFL)	Orville Freeman	429,320	42.72
Total votes		1,005,056	100.00
Republican hold			
