= C. Elmer Anderson =

American politician (1912–1998)

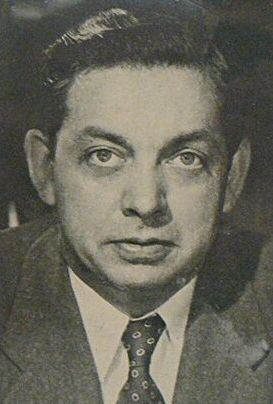
- Anderson c. 1972

28th Governor of Minnesota
- In office September 27, 1951 – January 5, 1955
- Lieutenant: Ancher Nelsen; Donald O. Wright
- Preceded by: Luther Youngdahl
- Succeeded by: Orville Freeman

30th and 33rd Lieutenant Governor of Minnesota
- In office January 2, 1945 – September 27, 1951
- Governor: Edward J. Thye; Luther W. Youngdahl
- Preceded by: Archie H. Miller
- Succeeded by: Ancher Nelsen
- In office January 2, 1939 – January 4, 1943
- Governor: Harold Stassen
- Preceded by: Gottfrid Lindsten
- Succeeded by: Edward John Thye

Mayor of Brainerd, Minnesota
- In office 1976–1983

Personal details
- Born: Clyde Elmer Anderson; March 16, 1912 Brainerd, Minnesota, U.S.
- Died: January 22, 1998 (aged 85) Brainerd, Minnesota, U.S.
- Party: Republican
- Spouse: Lillian Otterstad
- Education: University of Minnesota Medical School (Did not graduate)
- Profession: politician

Clyde Elmer Anderson (March 16, 1912 – January 22, 1998) was an American politician who served from September 27, 1951 to January 5, 1955, as the 28th governor of Minnesota. Anderson also served from 1939 to 1943 as the 30th lieutenant governor of Minnesota and from 1945 to 1951 as the 33rd.

== Life and career ==
Anderson was born in Brainerd, Minnesota, in 1912 to Fred and Anna Anderson, Swedish-speaking Finnish immigrants from Lappfors in Esse, Finland. His father died when he was 14, forcing him to get a job with a magazine and newspaper company to help support the family. He attended Brainerd High School and spent two quarters at the University of Minnesota studying medicine before running out of tuition money and returning home to continue working.

In 1938, he ran for lieutenant governor of Minnesota with Republican gubernatorial candidate Harold Stassen and won. At 31 and 26 years old, respectively, Stassen and Anderson were the youngest governor and lieutenant governor in state history. Anderson was reelected lieutenant governor five more times under three different governors. He holds the record for the most total years served as the state's lieutenant governor.

In September 1951, Anderson became governor when Luther Youngdahl resigned to become a federal judge in Washington, D.C. He won election to a full term in 1952 but was defeated by Orville Freeman two years later. After leaving the governor's office, he served as mayor of Nisswa from 1961 to 1963 and as mayor of Brainerd from 1976 to 1986. He died in Brainerd in 1998. The C. Elmer Anderson Memorial Highway is named in his honor.

Party political offices
Preceded by Arthur E. Nelson	Republican nominee for Lieutenant Governor of Minnesota; 1938, 1940	Succeeded by Edward John Thye
Preceded by Edward John Thye	Republican nominee for Lieutenant Governor of Minnesota; 1944, 1946, 1948, 1950	Succeeded by Ancher Nelsen
Preceded by Luther Youngdahl	Republican nominee for Governor of Minnesota; 1952, 1954	Succeeded by Ancher Nelsen
Preceded by Virginia Paul Holm	Republican nominee for Minnesota Secretary of State; 1956	Succeeded by L. C. Andersen
Political offices
Preceded by Gottfrid Lindsten	Lieutenant Governor of Minnesota; 1939–1943	Succeeded by Edward John Thye
Preceded by Archie H. Miller	Lieutenant Governor of Minnesota; 1945–1951	Succeeded by Ancher Nelsen
Preceded by Luther Youngdahl	Governor of Minnesota; 1951–1955	Succeeded by Orville Freeman
