= 1956 Minnesota gubernatorial election =

- November 6, 1956
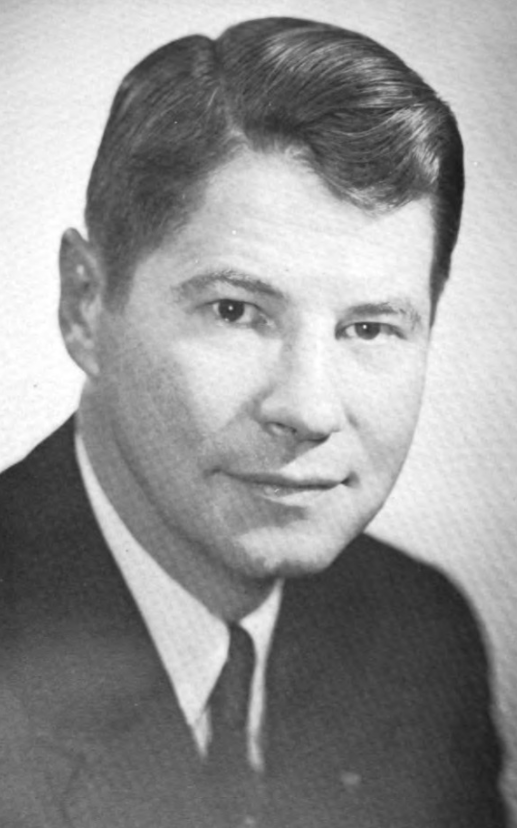

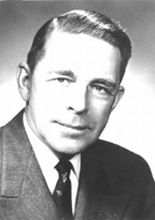
Nominee	Orville Freeman	Ancher Nelsen
Party	Democratic (DFL)	Republican
Popular vote	731,180	685,196
Percentage	51.41%	48.18%
- County results Freeman: 50–60% 60–70% 70–80% Nelsen: 40–50% 50–60% 60–70%
Governor before election
Orville Freeman
Democratic (DFL)
Elected Governor
Orville Freeman
Democratic (DFL)

The 1956 Minnesota gubernatorial election took place on November 6, 1956. Minnesota Democratic–Farmer–Labor Party candidate Orville Freeman defeated Republican Party of Minnesota challenger Ancher Nelsen.

== Democratic-Farmer-Labor primary ==
Freeman was renominated.

=== Candidates ===
==== Nominated ====
- Orville Freeman, incumbent

==== Eliminated in primary ====
- Thomas P. Duffy, electrician
- Francis P. McGrath, softwater conditioning business owner
- Mamie Norby, teacher

=== Results ===
Democratic-Farmer-Labor primary results
Party	Candidate	Votes	%
Democratic (DFL)	Orville Freeman	269,740	89.50%
Democratic (DFL)	Francis P. McGrath	13,910	4.62%
Democratic (DFL)	Thomas P. Duffy	12,851	4.26%
Democratic (DFL)	Mamie Norby	4,876	1.62%
Total votes		301,377	100%

== Republican primary ==
Nelsen was nominated.

=== Candidates ===
==== Nominated ====
- Ancher Nelsen, former lieutenant governor

==== Eliminated in primary ====
- Paul Indykiewicz, welder
- Walt Warner, salesman

=== Results ===
Republican Party of Minnesota primary results
Party	Candidate	Votes	%
Republican	Ancher Nelsen	283,844	94.40%
Republican	Walt Warner	12,195	4.06%
Republican	Paul Indykiewicz	4,654	1.55%
Total votes		300,693	100%

== General election ==
=== Candidates ===
- Orville Freeman, incumbent (DFL)
- Rudolph Gustafson, plumber (Industrial Government)
- Ancher Nelsen, former lieutenant governor (Republican)

=== Endorsements ===
Orville Freeman (DFL)

Statewide officials

- Hjalmar Petersen, former governor
Ancher Nelsen (R)

Executive branch officials

- Dwight D. Eisenhower, incumbent president

=== Campaigns ===
During his campaign, Nelsen visited a hospital in Hastings, Minnesota. He described the conditions as "shocking", and questioned Freeman's claimed successes in healthcare. Nelsen invited Freeman to join him in visiting hospitals around the state, "to determine the facts." Nelsen was the first gubernatorial candidate to appear on television during his campaign.

Freeman argued that a four-year term would be preferable for governor, opposed to the current two-year terms. Freeman believed that two years was not a sufficient amount of time for programs to be fully implemented and given a fair chance.

Prior to official results, Nelsen was expected to win the election.

=== Debates ===
This was the first gubernatorial election in Minnesota in which debates were held.

1956 Minnesota gubernatorial election debates
No.	Date	Host	Republican	DFL
Key: P Participant A Absent N Non-invitee I Invitee W Withdrawn				
Key: P Participant A Absent N Non-invitee I Invitee W Withdrawn			Ancher Nelsen	Orville Freeman
1	November 2, 1956	Mount Olivet Lutheran Church	P	P

== Results ==
1956 gubernatorial election, Minnesota
Party	Candidate	Votes	%	±%
Democratic (DFL)	Orville Freeman (incumbent)	731,180	51.41%	−1.31%
Republican	Ancher Nelsen	685,196	48.18%	+1.38%
Industrial Government	Rudolph Gustafson	5,785	0.41%	−0.07%
Majority		45,984	3.23%	
Turnout		1,422,161		
Democratic (DFL) hold		Swing		

== See also ==
- List of Minnesota gubernatorial elections
