= 1954 Minnesota gubernatorial election =

- November 2, 1954
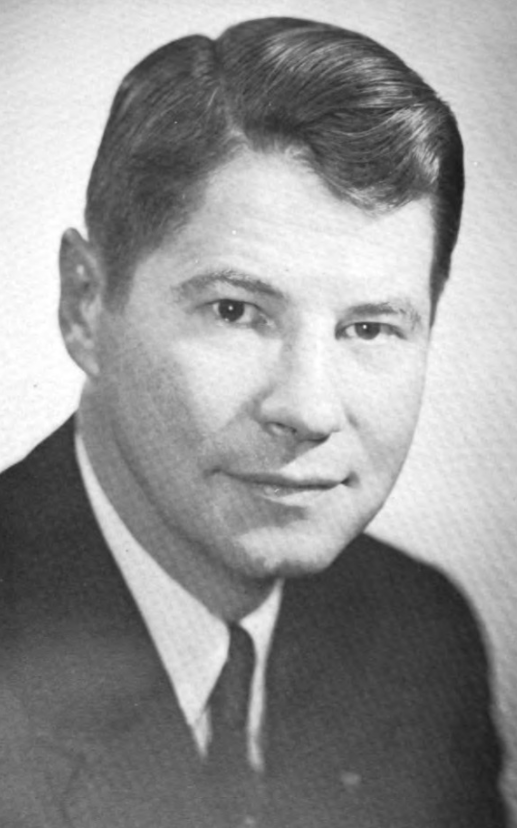

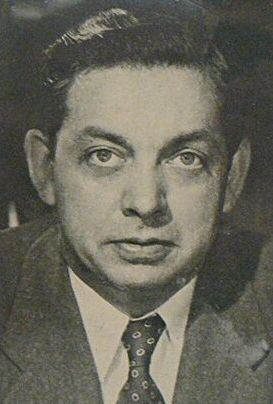
Nominee	Orville Freeman	C. Elmer Anderson
Party	Democratic (DFL)	Republican
Popular vote	607,099	538,865
Percentage	52.73%	46.80%
- County results Freeman: 40–50% 50–60% 60–70% 70–80% Anderson: 40–50% 50–60% 60–70% 70–80%
Governor before election
C. Elmer Anderson
Republican
Elected Governor
Orville Freeman
Democratic (DFL)

The 1954 Minnesota gubernatorial election took place on November 2, 1954. In a rematch of the 1952 election, Minnesota Democratic–Farmer–Labor Party (DFL) candidate Orville Freeman defeated Republican incumbent C. Elmer Anderson.

Freeman was the first member of the DFLer to win a gubernatorial election. The Republicans had won the previous eight elections. 1954 was their first gubernatorial defeat since 1936.

== Republican primary ==
Anderson was renominated unanimously.

=== Candidates ===
==== Nominated ====
- C. Elmer Anderson, incumbent

=== Results ===
Republican Party of Minnesota primary results
Party	Candidate	Votes	%
Republican	C. Elmer Anderson	244,157	100%
Total votes		244,157	100%

== Democratic-Farmer-Labor primary ==
Fremman was renominated. He was expected by State Chair Ray Hemenway to be renominated unanimously, with Rasmussen's primary campaign being a surprise. Rasmussen was an early supporter of Freeman.

=== Candidates ===
==== Nominated ====
- Orville Freeman, former DFL party chairman

==== Eliminated in primary ====
- Paul A. Rasmussen, railroad and warehouse commissioner

=== Results ===
Democratic-Farmer-Labor primary results
Party	Candidate	Votes	%
Democratic (DFL)	Orville Freeman	273,306	81.52%
Democratic (DFL)	Paul A. Rasmussen	61,976	18.48%
Total votes		335,282	100%

== Candidates ==
- C. Elmer Anderson, incumbent (Republican)
- Orville Freeman, DFL party chairman (DFL)
- Ross Schelin, machine operator (Industrial Government)

== Campaigns ==
Anderson and Freeman, who both already had a disliking for each other, began attacking each other with increasingly personal insults during their campaigns. Anderson called Freeman and the DFLers "a dangerous and ruthless team of self-seeking self-serving candidates and their cronies," while Freeman called the Republicans "The virus of creeping do-nothingism."

Freeman spoke of the Republican administrations as "Promises without Performance," said that the goal of both parties should be to provide good government, and urged Anderson to either deliver good government, or lose the election so Freeman could deliver it.

== Results ==
1954 gubernatorial election, Minnesota
Party	Candidate	Votes	%	±%
Democratic (DFL)	Orville Freeman	607,099	52.73%	+8.71%
Republican	C. Elmer Anderson (incumbent)	538,865	46.80%	−8.53%
Industrial Government	Ross Schelin	5,453	0.47%	+0.19%
Majority		68,234	5.93%	
Turnout		1,151,417		
Democratic (DFL) gain from Republican		Swing		

== See also ==
- List of Minnesota gubernatorial elections
