= 1960 Minnesota gubernatorial election =

- November 8, 1960
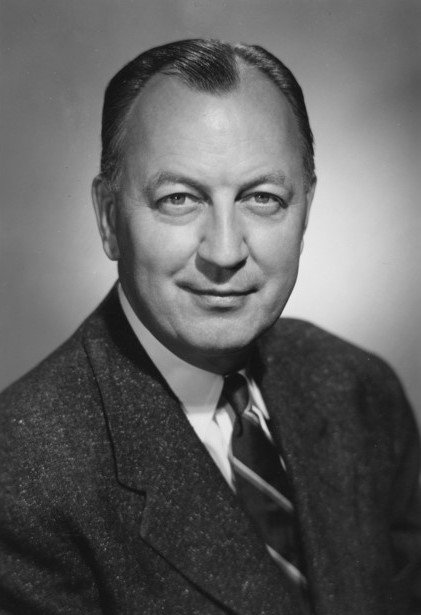

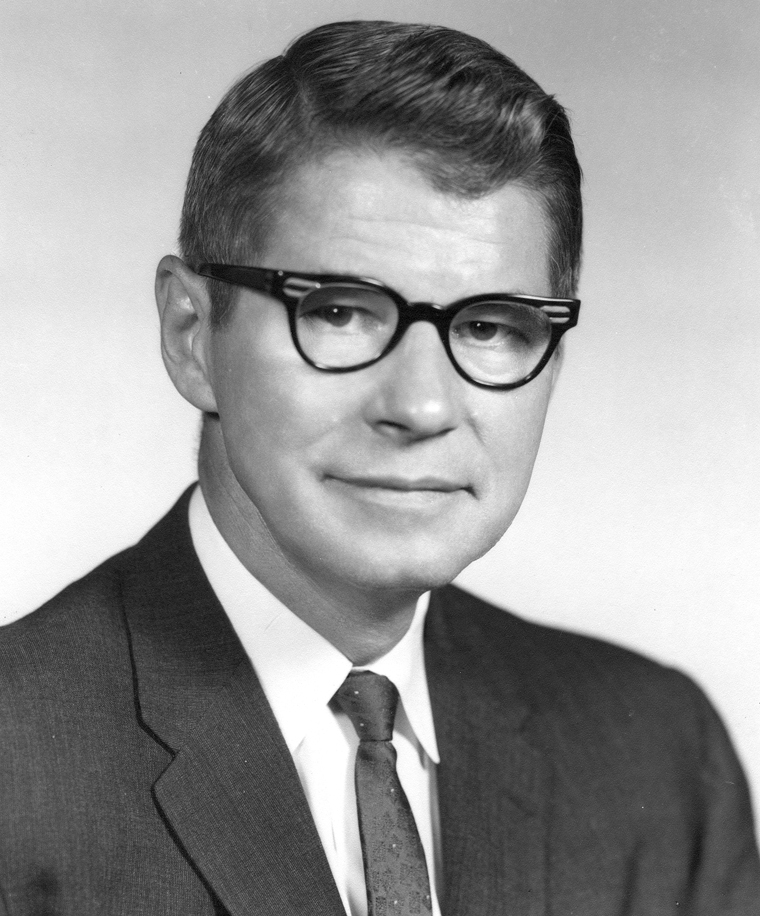
| Nominee | Elmer Andersen | Orville Freeman |
| Party | Republican | Democratic (DFL) |
| Popular vote | 783,813 | 760,934 |
| Percentage | 50.56% | 49.08% |
- County results Andersen: 50–60% 60–70% 70–80% Freeman: 40–50% 50–60% 60–70%
Governor before election
Orville Freeman
Democratic (DFL)
Elected Governor
Elmer Andersen
Republican

The 1960 Minnesota gubernatorial election took place on November 8, 1960. Republican candidate Elmer Andersen defeated incumbent Minnesota Democratic–Farmer–Labor Party (DFL) governor Orville Freeman.

== Democratic-Farmer-Labor primary ==
Freeman was renominated. This was Freeman's fifth consecutive primary win.

=== Candidates ===
==== Nominated ====
- Orville Freeman, incumbent

==== Eliminated in primary ====
- Col. Belmont Tudisco, World War II veteran, painter

=== Results ===
Democratic-Farmer-Labor primary results
| Party | Candidate | Votes | % |
|---|---|---|---|
| Democratic (DFL) | Orville Freeman | 264,571 | 88.78% |
| Democratic (DFL) | Belmont Tudisco | 33,452 | 11.22% |
| Total votes | | 298,023 | 100% |

== Republican primary ==
Elmer Andersen was nominated without opposition.

=== Candidates ===
==== Nominated ====
- Elmer Andersen, former State senator

=== Results ===
Republican primary results
| Party | Candidate | Votes | % |
|---|---|---|---|
| Republican | Elmer Andersen | 273,032 | 100% |
| Total votes | | 273,032 | 100% |

== General election ==
=== Candidates ===
- Elmer Andersen, former state senator (Republican)
- Orville Freeman, incumbent (DFL)
- Rudolph Gustafson, plumber (Industrial Government)

=== Campaigns ===
Freeman campaigned alongside his political ally, Senator Hubert Humphrey. Freeman ended his campaign with a tour of mining towns in the Mesabi range, however enthusiasm for his campaign was waning, with local leaders regardless of party expressing pro-Andersen sentiments to the press. Mayor Joe Jagunich of Eveleth stated that despite previous support for Freeman, big industry and Freeman were unwilling to 'go together', hurting the local economy. Andersen was able to attack Freeman's industrial and fiscal policies. Andersen cited that major companies had left the state, with job growth stunted in the hundreds compared to other states' tens of thousands of new jobs. Andersen campaigned on an expansion of the mining, timber, and tourism industries as goals.

=== Debates ===
This was the second gubernatorial election in Minnesota in which debates were held. The previous one was held in 1956.

1960 Minnesota gubernatorial election debates
| No. | Date | Host | Moderator | Republican | DFL |
| Key: P Participant A Absent N Non-invitee I Invitee W Withdrawn | | | | | |
| Key: P Participant A Absent N Non-invitee I Invitee W Withdrawn | | | | Elmer Andersen | Orville Freeman |
|---|---|---|---|---|---|
| 1 | October 9, 1960 | University of Minnesota | Dr. Edgar Carlson | P | P |

=== Results ===
1960 gubernatorial election, Minnesota
| Party | Candidate | Votes | % | ±% |
|---|---|---|---|---|
| Republican | Elmer Andersen | 783,813 | 50.56% | +8.35% |
| Democratic (DFL) | Orville Freeman (incumbent) | 760,934 | 49.08% | −7.67% |
| Industrial Government | Rudolph Gustafson | 5,518 | 0.36% | −0.58% |
| Majority | | 22,879 | 1.48% | |
| Turnout | | 1,550,265 | | |
| Republican gain from Democratic (DFL) | | Swing | | |

== See also ==
- List of Minnesota gubernatorial elections
