= Orville Freeman =

American politician (1918–2003)

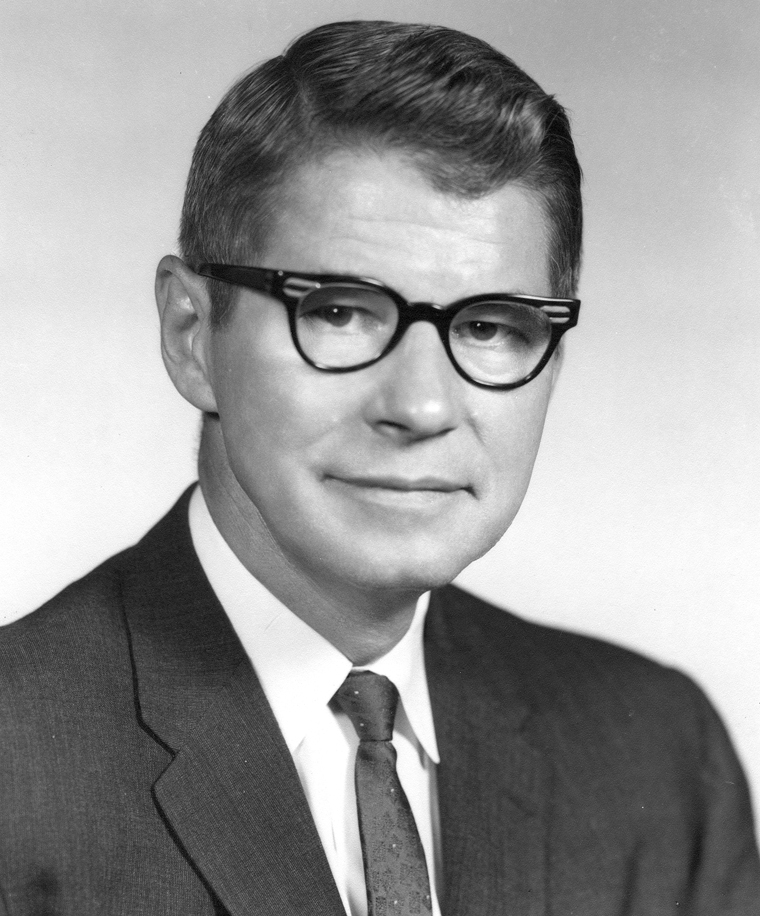
- Freeman in 1961

16th United States Secretary of Agriculture
- In office January 21, 1961 – January 20, 1969
- President: John F. Kennedy; Lyndon B. Johnson
- Preceded by: Ezra Taft Benson
- Succeeded by: Clifford M. Hardin

29th Governor of Minnesota
- In office January 5, 1955 – January 2, 1961
- Lieutenant: Karl Rolvaag
- Preceded by: C. Elmer Anderson
- Succeeded by: Elmer L. Andersen

Personal details
- Born: Orville Lothrop Freeman; May 9, 1918 Minneapolis, Minnesota, U.S.
- Died: February 20, 2003 (aged 84) Minneapolis, Minnesota, U.S.
- Resting place: Lakewood Cemetery
- Party: Democratic
- Spouse: Jane Shields (m. 1942)
- Children: 2, including Michael
- Education: University of Minnesota (BA, LLB)

Military service
- Branch/service: United States Marine Corps
- Rank: Major
- Battles/wars: World War II • Battle of Bougainville

Orville Lothrop Freeman (May 9, 1918 – February 20, 2003) was an American politician who served as the 29th governor of Minnesota from 1955 to 1961, and as the U.S. secretary of agriculture from 1961 to 1969 under Presidents John F. Kennedy and Lyndon B. Johnson. He was one of the founding members of the Minnesota Democratic–Farmer–Labor Party and influential in the merger of the Minnesota Democratic and Farmer-Labor parties. Freeman nominated Kennedy for president at the 1960 Democratic National Convention.

== Early life ==
Freeman was born on May 9, 1918, in Minneapolis, Minnesota, the son of Orville and Frances (Schroeder) Freeman. His grandfather had emigrated from Sweden to a farm in rural Zumbrota, Minnesota. He attended Central High School in Minneapolis. In 1940, Freeman graduated magna cum laude and Phi Beta Kappa from the University of Minnesota, where he was a reserve quarterback on the football team and where he met his lifelong friend and political ally Hubert Humphrey. He also met his wife, Jane Charlotte Shields, in college. They married on May 2, 1942, and had two children.

== Military service ==
Figuring that the United States would eventually become involved in World War II, Freeman signed up for the Marine Reserve in 1940 with the understanding he could finish law school before he fulfilled his required service. The attack on Pearl Harbor ended that arrangement, and on December 31, 1941, he received orders to report to Officer Candidate School at Marine Corps Base Quantico.

After graduating and following training to be an infantry officer, Freeman reported to Camp Elliot, just outside San Diego, California. He was soon assigned to the 9th Marine Regiment, Kilo Company, 3rd Battalion, 9th Marines. His unit shipped out overseas for periods of training in New Zealand and Guadalcanal.

On November 1, 1943, Freeman saw his first combat when his unit came ashore at Torokina on Bougainville in what were the first battles of the Bougainville Campaign. A few days later, while he was leading a patrol, he encountered a group of five or six Japanese soldiers in a clearing. An exchange of gunfire followed, and Freeman was wounded in the jaw and left arm. He was evacuated to a US Army hospital on New Caledonia and then to a Naval hospital on Nouméa. He returned to the U.S. in 1944 but never recovered enough movement in his arm to pass a Marine Corps physical to return to combat.

== Political career ==
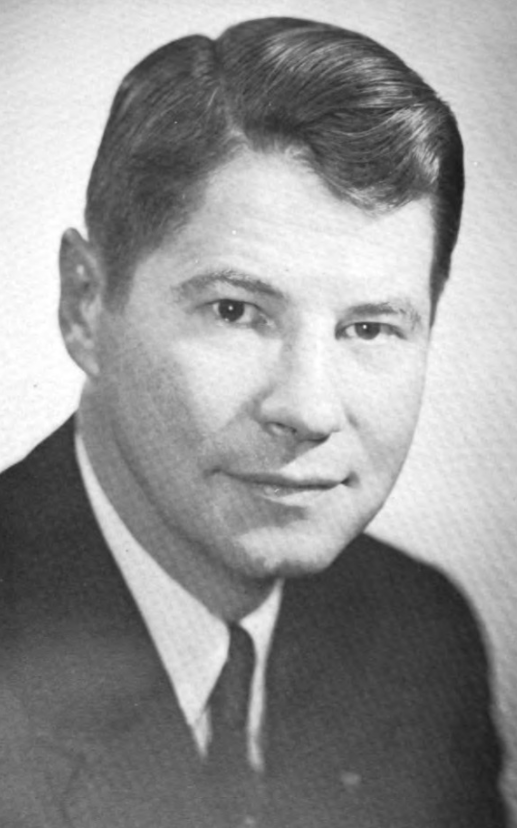
Freeman as governor

Freeman earned his LL.B. from the University of Minnesota Law School in 1946. He then practiced law in Minneapolis. Freeman also served as secretary (1946-1948) and chairman (1948-1950) of the newly formed Minnesota Democratic-Farmer-Labor Party, was a political aide to his college friend Humphrey, who was mayor of Minneapolis at the time, and managed Humphrey's successful 1948 campaign for the U.S. Senate. He ran unsuccessfully for attorney general of Minnesota in 1950 and for governor in 1952.

Freeman was elected governor in 1954, becoming the state's first DFL governor. On November 13, 1955, Freeman was a guest on the variety show Toast of the Town, which was later called The Ed Sullivan Show. Freeman was reelected in 1956 and 1958. He argued that a four-year term would be preferable to a two-year term because two years was not enough time for programs to be fully implemented and given a fair chance. Gubernatorial terms were extended to four years under Governor Karl Rolvaag.

In 1958, Freeman was considered as a candidate for U.S. Senate. He said there was a "superabundance of good candidates" and refused to run, remaining governor instead.

Freeman took the unusual action of declaring martial law in Albert Lea on December 11, 1959, to maintain law and order during a strike at the Wilson Packing Company. After 12 days, a federal court ruled that martial law was inappropriate. Freeman lost reelection to Elmer L. Andersen that November.

In July 1960, Freeman nominated U.S. Senator John F. Kennedy for president at the 1960 Democratic National Convention.

Following his defeat for reelection as governor in 1960, Freeman was appointed as U.S. Secretary of Agriculture by the newly elected President Kennedy, and he was retained in that post by President Lyndon B. Johnson. He served until January 21, 1969. Governor Andersen supported Freeman's nomination.

== Later life ==
Later, Freeman headed two consulting businesses and practiced law in Washington, D.C. He was president and CEO of Business International Corporation from 1970 to 1985.

Freeman attended the September 1974 dedication of the Lyndon Baines Johnson Memorial Grove on the Potomac with President Gerald Ford, Lady Bird Johnson, and other former members of the Johnson cabinet.

Freeman died from complications of Alzheimer's disease on February 20, 2003, in Minneapolis. He was buried in that city's Lakewood Cemetery.

== Legacy ==
Freeman is remembered for submitting proposed legislation to establish the Food Stamp Program for the poor, which is still in use today.

His son Mike Freeman ran unsuccessfully for governor in 1998 and served non-consecutive terms as County Attorney for Hennepin County, Minnesota (1991 to 1999, and 2007 to 2023).

The Orville L. Freeman Award for Distinguished Service to Greater Minnesota and Agricultural Issues is named in his honor and has been annually issued since 2012.

== Awards and decorations ==
Freeman's decorations and medals include:

Purple Heart	Asiatic-Pacific Campaign Medal w/ service star	World War II Victory Medal

== See also ==
- List of notable United States Marines

== Notes ==
Party political offices
Preceded by Francis M. Smith	Democratic nominee for Attorney General of Minnesota; 1950	Succeeded by Allan L. Johnson
Preceded by Harry H. Peterson	Democratic nominee for Governor of Minnesota; 1952, 1954, 1956, 1958, 1960	Succeeded by Karl Rolvaag
Preceded by Harold H. Barker	Democratic-Farmer-Labor Party Chairman; 1948-1950	Succeeded by Karl Rolvaag
Political offices
Preceded by C. Elmer Anderson	Governor of Minnesota; 1955–1961	Succeeded by Elmer L. Andersen
Preceded by Ezra Taft Benson	United States Secretary of Agriculture; 1961–1969	Succeeded by Clifford M. Hardin
