= 1966 Minnesota Attorney General election =

- November 8, 1966
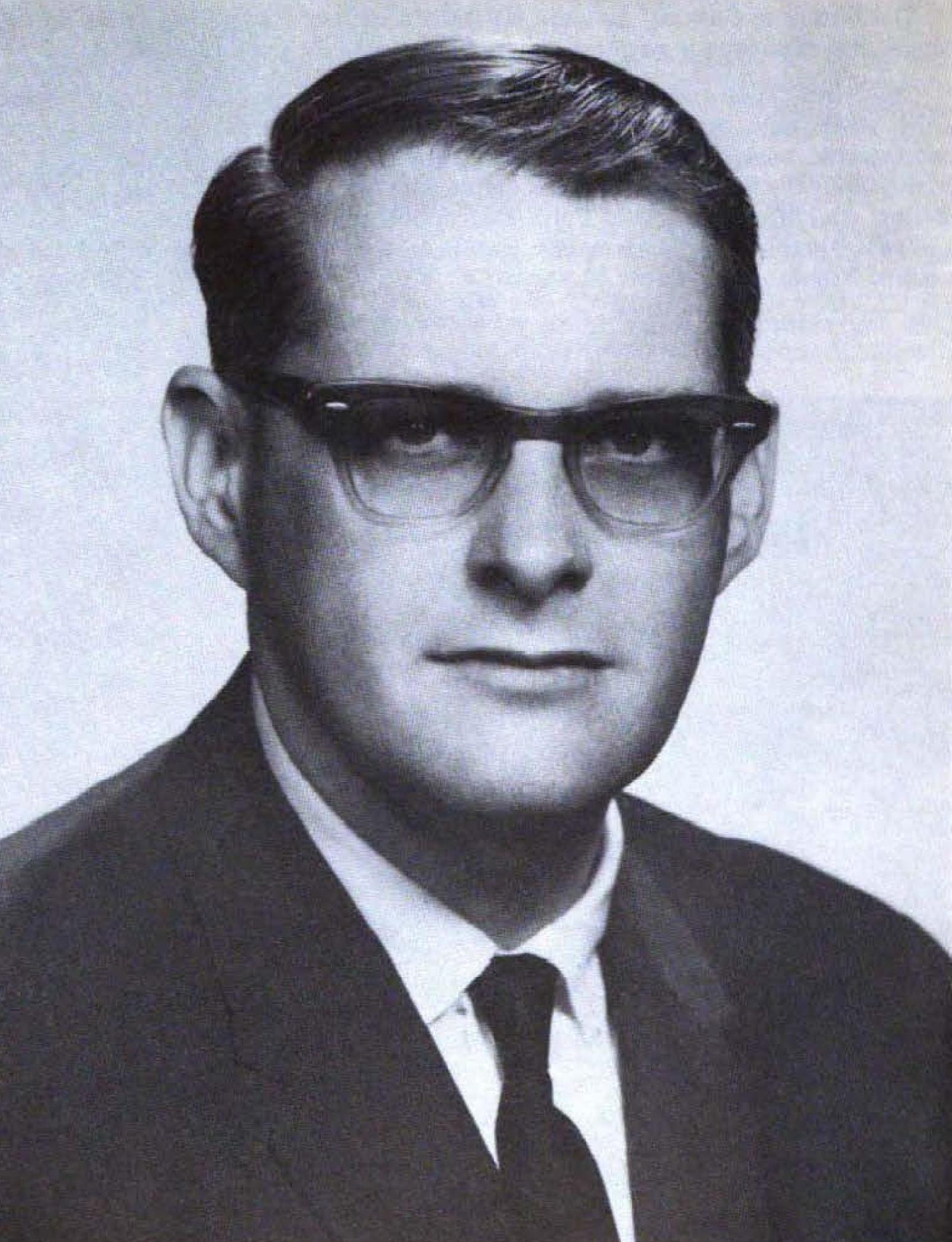

Nominee	Douglas M. Head	Wayne H. Olson
Party	Republican	Democratic (DFL)
Popular vote	667,852	586,982
Percentage	53.22%	46.78%
- County results Head: 50–60% 60–70% Olson: 50–60% 60–70%
Attorney General before election
Robert W. Mattson Sr. (Acting)
Democratic (DFL)
Elected Attorney General
Douglas M. Head
Republican

The 1966 Minnesota Attorney General election was held on November 8, 1966, in order to elect the attorney general of Minnesota. Republican nominee and former member of the Minnesota House of Representatives Douglas M. Head defeated Democratic–Farmer–Labor nominee Wayne H. Olson. To date, this is the last time a Republican won the attorney general's office in Minnesota.

== General election ==
On election day, November 8, 1966, Republican nominee Douglas M. Head won the election by a margin of 80,870 votes against his opponent Democratic–Farmer–Labor nominee Wayne H. Olson, thereby gaining Republican control over the office of attorney general. Head was sworn in as the 25th attorney general of Minnesota on January 2, 1967.

=== Results ===
Minnesota Attorney General election, 1966
Party	Candidate	Votes	%
Republican	Douglas M. Head	667,852	53.22
Democratic (DFL)	Wayne H. Olson	586,982	46.78
Total votes		1,254,834	100.00
Republican gain from Democratic (DFL)			
