= Replogle =

Replogle may refer to:

- Replogle (name)
- Replogle Globes, an American company
