= Wayne H. Olson =

Commissioner of Conservation
- In office 1963–1966
- Governor: Karl Rolvaag

Assistant Minnesota Attorney General
- In office 1956–1957

Personal details
- Born: December 5, 1924 Swanville Township, Minnesota
- Died: October 2, 2015 (aged 90) St. Paul, Minnesota
- Party: Democratic (DFL)
- Education: Macalester College; University of Minnesota

Wayne H. Olson (December 5, 1924 – October 2, 2015) was a U.S. lawyer and politician from Minnesota.

Olson was born in Swanville Township, Minnesota on December 5, 1924, as the 12th of 13 children. He graduated from Upsala High School in 1942. He served in the U.S. Army Air Corps in the Pacific War, as a navigator in a B-24 Liberator. After his discharge, he attended Macalester College, and earned a law degree from the University of Minnesota. In 1947, he joined the DFL. In 1953, he was admitted to the bar.

In 1955, he served as special assistant to the Minnesota Attorney General. In 1956, he was named as Assistant Minnesota Attorney General. He then became the head of legal staff for the Conservation Department, appointed by Miles Lord. He would serve in that position from 1957-1960. He would serve as Chief Deputy Attorney General under Walter Mondale from 1962-1963, when he was appointed by Governor Karl Rolvaag as Commissioner of Conservation. In 1966, he unsuccessfully ran for Minnesota Attorney General. He would continue his work as an attorney until at least 1989.

He died in St. Paul, Minnesota, in 2015 at age 90. He is buried at the Fort Snelling National Cemetery.

Party political offices
Preceded by Walter Mondale	DFL nominee for Attorney General of Minnesota; 1966	Succeeded by Warren Spannaus
