= 1966 Minnesota lieutenant gubernatorial election =

- November 8, 1966
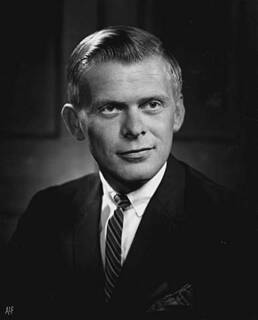

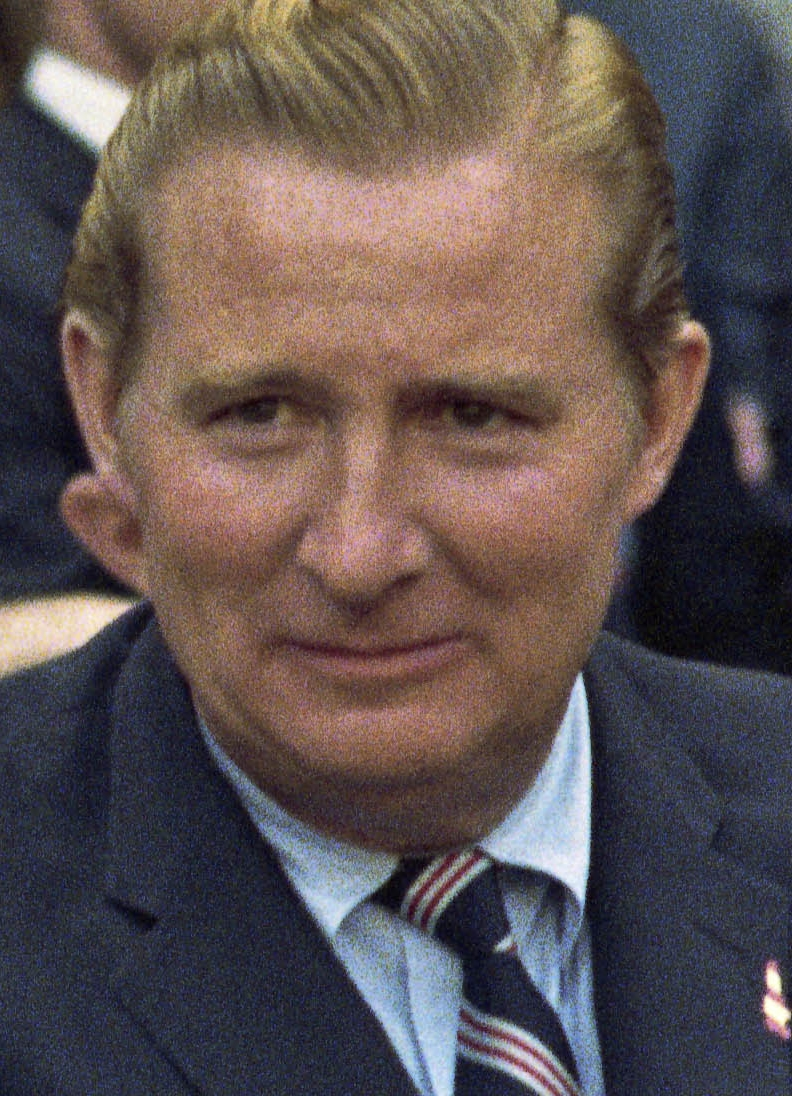
| Nominee | James B. Goetz | Robert E. Short |
| Party | Republican | Democratic (DFL) |
| Popular vote | 647,320 | 620,293 |
| Percentage | 51.07% | 48.93% |
- County results Goetz: 50–60% 60–70% Short: 50–60% 60–70%
Lieutenant Governor before election
Sandy Keith
Democratic (DFL)
Elected Lieutenant Governor
James B. Goetz
Republican

The 1966 Minnesota lieutenant gubernatorial election took place on November 8, 1966. Republican Party of Minnesota candidate James B. Goetz defeated Minnesota Democratic-Farmer-Labor Party challenger Robert E. Short.

== Results ==
1966 lieutenant gubernatorial election, Minnesota
| Party | Candidate | Votes | % | ±% |
|---|---|---|---|---|
| Republican | James B. Goetz | 647,320 | 51.07% | +1.26 |
| Democratic (DFL) | Robert E. Short | 620,293 | 48.93% | −1.26 |
| Majority | | 27,027 | 2.14% | |
| Turnout | | 1,267,613 | | |
| Republican gain from Democratic (DFL) | | Swing | | |
