= 1962 Minnesota lieutenant gubernatorial election =

- November 6, 1962
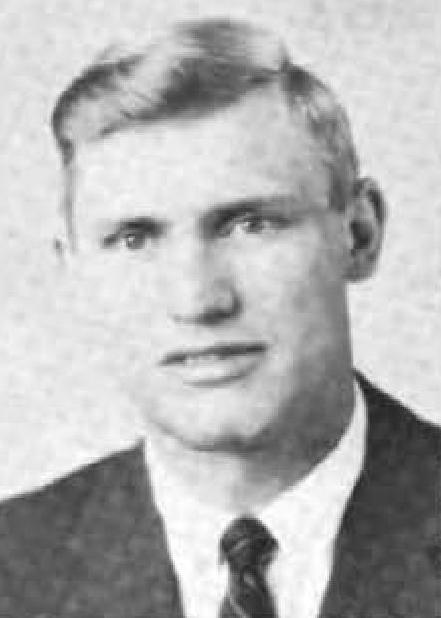

Nominee	Sandy Keith	C. Donald Peterson
Party	Democratic (DFL)	Republican
Popular vote	613,650	608,951
Percentage	50.19%	49.81%
- County results Keith: 50–60% 60–70% Peterson: 50–60% 60–70%
Lieutenant Governor before election
Karl Rolvaag
Democratic (DFL)
Elected Lieutenant Governor
Sandy Keith
Democratic (DFL)

The 1962 Minnesota lieutenant gubernatorial election took place on November 6, 1962. Minnesota Democratic-Farmer-Labor Party candidate Sandy Keith defeated Republican Party of Minnesota challenger C. Donald Peterson.

== Results ==
1962 Lieutenant Gubernatorial Election, Minnesota
Party	Candidate	Votes	%	±%
Democratic (DFL)	Sandy Keith	613,650	50.19%	−4.88%
Republican	C. Donald Peterson	608,951	49.81%	+4.88%
Majority		4,699	0.38%	
Turnout		1,222,601		
Democratic (DFL) hold		Swing		
