= 1970 Minnesota gubernatorial election =

- November 3, 1970
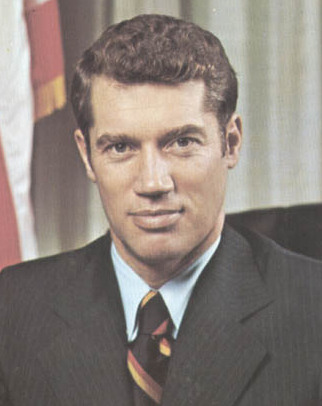

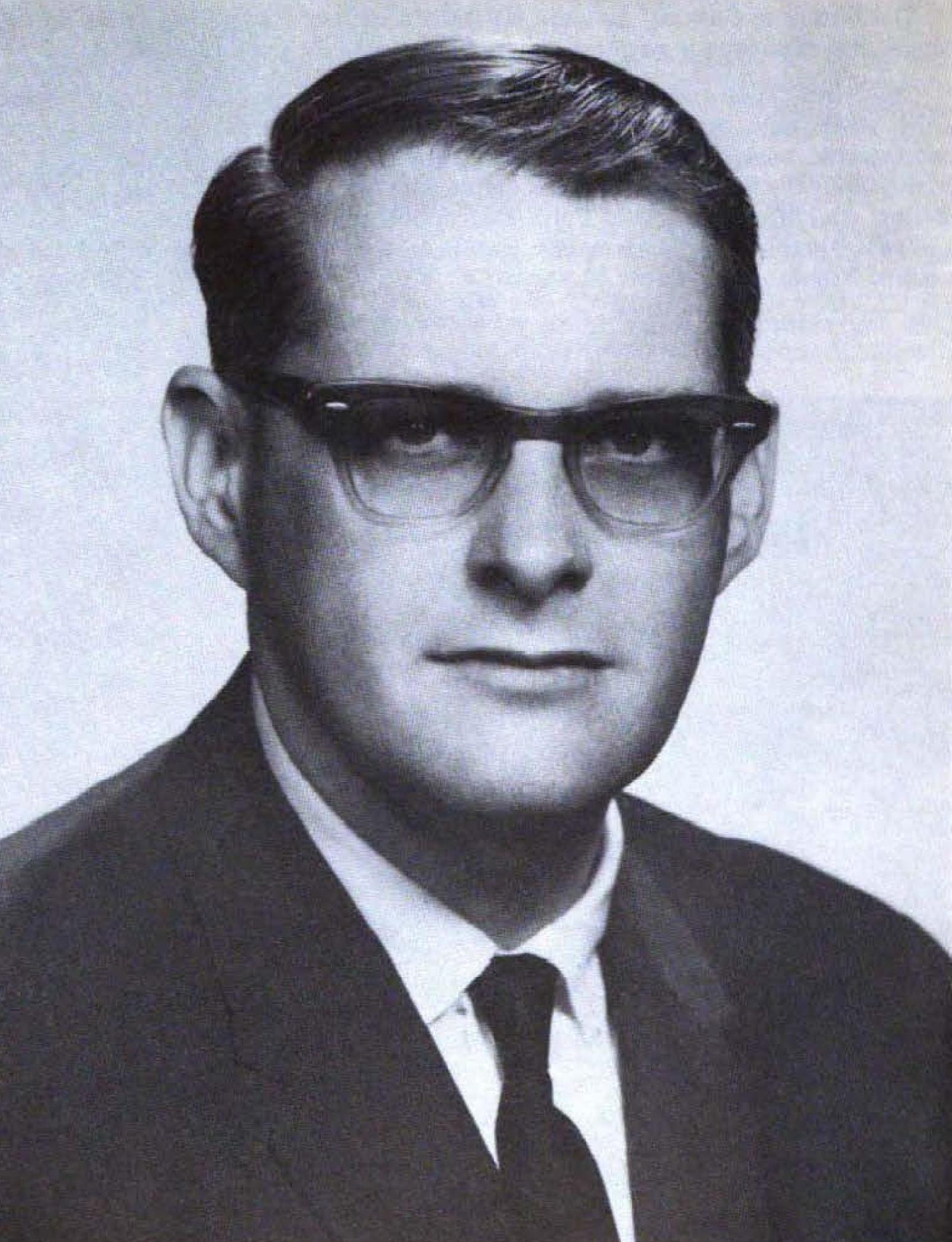
Nominee	Wendell Anderson	Douglas M. Head
Party	Democratic (DFL)	Republican
Popular vote	737,921	621,780
Percentage	54.04%	45.54%
- County results Anderson: 50–60% 60–70% 70–80% Head: 40–50% 50–60% 60–70%
Governor before election
Harold LeVander
Republican
Elected Governor
Wendell Anderson
Democratic (DFL)

The 1970 Minnesota gubernatorial election took place on November 3, 1970. Minnesota Democratic–Farmer–Labor Party (DFL) candidate Wendell Anderson defeated Republican challenger Douglas M. Head. Incumbent Harold LeVander was not seeking a second term.

== Republican primary ==
Head was nominated.

=== Candidates ===
==== Nominated ====
- Douglas M. Head, attorney general of Minnesota and former state representative from Minneapolis

==== Eliminated in primary ====
- Paul Moshier
- John C. Peterson, Duluth resident and perennial candidate
- Lorna Tarnowski, Chanhassen homemaker and candidate for governor in 1966

=== Results ===
1970 Republican gubernatorial primary
Party	Candidate	Votes	%
Republican	Douglas M. Head	210,621	87.51%
Republican	John C. Peterson	19,737	8.20%
Republican	Paul Moshier	6,372	2.65%
Republican	Lorna Tarnowski	3,964	1.65%
Total votes		240,694	100.00%

== Democratic-Farmer-Labor primary ==
Anderson was nominated unanimously.

=== Candidates ===
==== Nominated ====
- Wendell R. Anderson, state senator from St. Paul and 1956 Olympic silver medalist in ice hockey

=== Results ===
1970 DFL gubernatorial primary
Party	Candidate	Votes	%
Democratic (DFL)	Wendell R. Anderson	352,867	100.00%
Total votes		352,867	100.00%

== General election ==
=== Candidates ===
- Wendell R. Anderson, state senator from St. Paul and 1956 Olympic gold medalist in ice hockey (DFL)
- Douglas M. Head, attorney general of Minnesota and former state representative from Minneapolis (Republican)
- Karl H. Heck, White Bear Lake resident (Industrial Government)
- Jack O. Kirkham, mayor of Fridley (write-in)

=== Campaigns ===
The largest issue of the election was tax policy. Anderson campaigned on implementing a progressive income tax, and shifting the funding for education from local taxes to statewide taxes to deal with inequality. Head opposed Anderson's proposed school tax reforms, nicknaming him 'Spendy Wendy'. Head used the nickname in his campaigns, selling bumper stickers that read '$top $pendy Wendy'.

=== Debates ===
This was only the third gubernatorial debate in Minnesota history. The previous one was in 1960.

1970 Minnesota gubernatorial election debates
No.	Date	Host	Republican	DFL
Key: P Participant A Absent N Non-invitee I Invitee W Withdrawn				
Key: P Participant A Absent N Non-invitee I Invitee W Withdrawn			Douglas Head	Wendell Anderson
1	October 1, 1970	Citizens League	P	P

=== Results ===
1970 gubernatorial election, Minnesota
Party	Candidate	Votes	%	±%
Democratic (DFL)	Wendell Anderson	737,921	54.04%	+7.10%
Republican	Douglas M. Head	621,780	45.54%	−7.02%
Industrial Government	Karl Heck	4,781	0.35%	−0.15%
Independent	Jack O. Kirkham (write-in)	961	0.07%	
Majority		117,102	8.51%	
Turnout		1,365,443		
Democratic (DFL) gain from Republican		Swing		
