= John Sargent Pillsbury Jr. =

American attorney and businessperson (1912–2005)

John Sargent Pillsbury Jr. (1912–2005) was an American attorney, insurance executive, community leader, and patron of the arts in the U.S. State of Minnesota. He was a member of the Minnesota Pillsbury family, "one of Minnesota's most notable, public-spirited families" which built its fortunes in flour milling, iron ore, and forestry, and which practiced "a civic-minded capitalism that gave back to the community by supporting education, the arts and public institutions".

John S. Pillsbury was part of this tradition. In addition to his legal and business career, he led two organizations responsible for building significant buildings anchoring the ends of the Nicollet Mall in Minneapolis, the Northwestern National Life Building of the eponymous company which Pillsbury led, and Orchestra Hall, the home of the Minnesota Orchestra, which Pillsbury served as board chair. He was a board member for three educational institutions, several other nonprofits, and publicly held corporations. Long active in the Republican Party, he was an unsuccessful candidate for Governor of Minnesota.

== Early years and education ==
Pillsbury, born October 28, 1912, in Minneapolis, Minnesota, was a son of John Sargent Pillsbury and Eleanor Jerusha Lawler Pillsbury. The senior John Pillsbury was the son of Charles Alfred Pillsbury, a cofounder of the Pillsbury Company. The other co-founder was Charles' uncle, also named John Sargent Pillsbury, who had been governor of Minnesota in the nineteenth century.

Pillsbury went to preparatory school at Blake School in Minnesota and St. Paul's School in Concord, New Hampshire. He obtained a degree in history at Yale University in 1935 and worked for the Pillsbury Company in 1936 and 1937. Pillsbury then attended the University of Minnesota Law School, where he was Editor-in-Chief of the Minnesota Law Review. In 1940 he received his LL.B.

== Wartime service and professional career ==
After obtaining his law degree Pillsbury practiced law with the Minneapolis law firm of Faegre & Benson. He served in the United States Navy during World War II as an air combat intelligence officer in the Pacific Theater aboard aircraft carrier USS Ticonderoga (CV-14). Upon discharge from the service he returned to the private practice of law with his former firm, and became a partner in 1946.

In 1951, Pillsbury joined the board of Northwestern National Life Insurance Company, then a small local insurance company, which had been one of his clients. In 1956 he became its president after a management shakeup, and almost immediately was faced with a takeover attempt by Great Southern Life. He, other members of his family, and other board members bought up stock in the company, and made an offer to purchase the interests of other shareholders. As the dispute became public (as well as the subject of dueling lawsuits), Pillsbury obtained the support of the Minneapolis Chamber of Commerce and Democratic Governor Orville Freeman. Eventually the dispute was settled, and the company remained independent.

Very early in his presidency of the company he contracted for and initiated the use of computers for record-keeping and claims processing, which was uncommon in the mid-1950s. Pillsbury established personal connections with the company's agents—its sales force, which had direct communications with the policyholders, who held equity in the company. The company expanded rapidly, and had outgrown its Beaux-Arts headquarters on the south end of downtown Minneapolis. By the 1960s its headquarters staff was housed in five buildings. Pillsbury was the driving force behind the Northwestern National Life Building at the north end of the Nicollet Mall in downtown Minneapolis, and his relationship with the architect has been described as a "wonderful association" and a "real rapport". That architect was Minoru Yamasaki, then a regional architect. The new headquarters for the company was a modern building, incorporating Gothic arches. Yamasaki went on to design the World Trade Center, which incorporated design features of the Minneapolis building.

Pillsbury also was elected chair of North Atlantic Life Insurance Company of America, and led two life insurance industry organizations, including the Life Insurance Association of America.

== Political and community activities ==
Pillsbury ran for the office of Governor of Minnesota in 1966, an office held by his great-granduncle some 90 years before. The Republican Party held an internal race for who the party's endorsement in the primary would be. Harold LeVander defeated Pillsbury after sixteen ballots. Pillsbury then withdrew from the race. Governor Levander appointed him to the Compensation Review Board, in existence between 1971 and 1973. The board, which was chaired by Pillsbury, made recommendations on compensation of state employees.

A member of the Pillsbury family had been on the board of the Minneapolis Symphony Orchestra since 1907, four years after its founding. The orchestra changed its name to the Minnesota Orchestra in 1968, and on January 1, 1972, John S. Pillsbury became chairman of its board. Throughout its history, even during the Eugene Ormandy and Antal Dorati eras, the orchestra did not have its own concert hall. Its performances were principally given in the cavernous but problematic Northrup Auditorium at the University of Minnesota. The board decided to build a home for the orchestra. Pillsbury was involved in virtually all aspects of the new Orchestra Hall: negotiating a complex arrangement to obtain land, provide a parking ramp, and build the hall adjacent to a new plaza on Nicollet Mall; fundraising, stewardship of investments, negotiating recording contracts and labor agreements, scheduling, touring, and publicity. The hall's architecture was modern rather than traditional, but its acoustics were highly praised.

Pillsbury served on the boards of The Pillsbury Company, Boise Cascade, Northwestern Bell Telephone Company, Northwestern National Bank and its successor Northwestern Bancorporation (now Wells Fargo), and Wells Fargo Mortgage and Equity Trust.

He was a founding director of Twin Cities Public Television, and chaired the Minneapolis Community Chest, a forerunner to the United Way.

John Pillsbury was among a group of parents who organized the Orono School District in 1949, and was elected to its school board in 1951. He also was a trustee of the University of Minnesota Foundation. His interests were not limited to academic education; Pillsbury also was a member of the board of the Dunwoody Institute, a two-year vocational college for "the useful trades and crafts".

In 1966, the University of Minnesota Law School honored Pillsbury with its "Outstanding Achievement Award" for his contributions to "law, business, and politics, as well as fine arts, education, and health and social research", and for his work as "first president of the University Community Development Corporation".

== Personal life ==
Pillsbury married Katharine Harrison Clark in 1936. They had four children; three boys and one girl.

An avid sailor, he won the Class A scow championship of the Inland Lake Yachting Association five times, and served as Commodore of the Minnetonka Yacht Club.

John Pillsbury died March 28, 2005, of natural causes, and was buried in Lakewood Cemetery in Minneapolis. He was survived by his wife of 68 years and all four of their children.

== Sources ==
- Sturdevant, Lori (2011). The Pillsburys of Minnesota. Minneapolis: Nodine Press. ISBN 978 1 935666 22 6.
