= Elmer L. Andersen =

American politician (1909–2004)

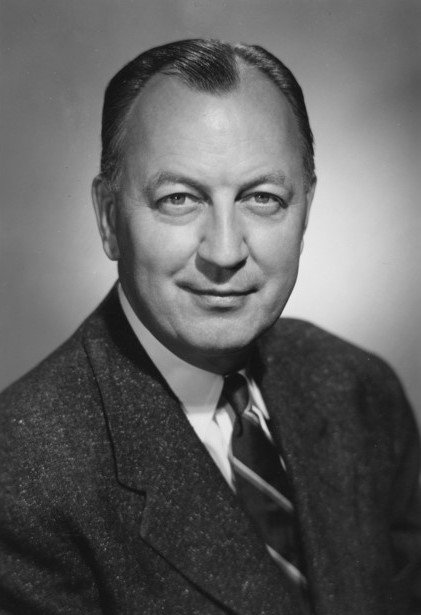
- Andersen as Governor of Minnesota, 1961

30th Governor of Minnesota
- In office January 2, 1961 – March 25, 1963
- Lieutenant: Karl Rolvaag; Alexander M. Keith
- Preceded by: Orville Freeman
- Succeeded by: Karl Rolvaag

Member of the Minnesota Senate from the 42nd district
- In office February 2, 1949 – January 5, 1959
- Preceded by: Claude Henry Allen
- Succeeded by: Clifton T. Parks

Personal details
- Born: Elmer Lee Andersen; June 17, 1909 Chicago, Illinois, U.S.
- Died: November 15, 2004 (aged 95) Minneapolis, Minnesota, U.S.
- Party: Republican
- Spouse: Eleanor Johnson (m. 1932)
- Profession: businessman, philanthropist

Elmer Lee Andersen (June 17, 1909 – November 15, 2004) was an American businessman, philanthropist, and politician who built a successful business career with the H. B. Fuller Company. Andersen was most notably the 30th governor of Minnesota. A self-described progressive Republican, he was a well-regarded politician who passed many social and environmental regulations during his time as governor.

In one of the closest elections in the history of Minnesota and the United States, Andersen lost the 1962 Minnesota gubernatorial election by 91 votes to Karl Rolvaag.

== Early life and education ==
Andersen was born in Chicago. His mother, Jennie Olivia Johnson (1877–1925), was the daughter of a seaman from Luleå, Sweden, who came to America as a young man and worked in the timber business. Elmer's father, Arne Kjelsberg Andersen (1866–1926), was an immigrant from Solør, Norway, who had settled in Chicago and became a streetcar motorman, operating on the Halsted streetcar line out of the Ashland Avenue car barns. "My earliest memory", Andersen wrote in his memoirs, "is of riding with him on the streetcar and being permitted to clang the bell as we came to street crossings." His parents separated when he was six years old. Andersen never understood why his parents separated and never questioned them. He and his mother and infant sister, Caroline, moved to Muskegon, Michigan. His two older brothers, Arnold and Marvin, arrived in Muskegon later. The Andersens had only sporadic contact with their father after the separation. At age nine, Elmer contracted a mild form of polio but, through exercise, regained his strength.

Andersen's brothers worked for E. H. Sheldon and Company in Muskegon, a manufacturer of specialty school furniture. Too young to work in the factory, Elmer's first job was helping his mother, who took in washing. From there he moved on to selling newspapers, vegetables, specialty products, candy bars and soft drinks. He also carried travelers' bags from the boat docks to the train station. "I love selling", he wrote. "I love the interchange with people. A good salesman gains influence on another person's mind. That makes selling quite a serious undertaking." At age 14, Andersen joined his brothers at Sheldon and Company. He also wrote short essays on birds that were published in the Muskegon Chronicle. "The thrill I had seeing those columns in print was the start of an abiding attraction to the newspaper business."

Andersen's mother was devoted to church work and ensured that her children were raised in the Lutheran church; Andersen was confirmed at Our Savior's Lutheran Church in Muskegon. In 1925, his mother contracted a cold that developed into pneumonia. She died at home on March 3, 1925, with Andersen at her bedside. Within a year, his father also died, of a heart attack.

Andersen graduated from high school in 1926 and became a member of the first class of the newly established Muskegon Junior College. Upon graduating two years later, he received the first diploma awarded by the school. While in college, he held a sales job with J. J. Fagan and Company, a real estate firm, and worked as a stringer for the Muskegon Chronicle, while starting a newspaper for the junior college. Not long after, he and his brothers started a company, Muskegon Realty, which also sold casualty insurance for the Mercury Insurance Company. "I matured fast in those years. I was selling homes and farms. I was selling insurance. I was editing a college newspaper and stringing for a daily newspaper. I was studying and learning about things I had never known existed. It was almost an incredible time."

Andersen graduated from junior college in 1928. For the next year, he worked as a salesman for the Sheldon Company, working out of Minneapolis, Minnesota. "A year in Minneapolis left me convinced that I wanted something more. I wanted to enroll at the University of Minnesota. I usually approach a new venture with specific objectives. In aiming for the University of Minnesota, I had three: I wanted to get a degree for reasons of job protection. I did not want somebody to push ahead of me because he had a degree and I did not. Another object was to meet a woman whom I might marry. I was beginning to long for a home life and a family. I was lonely. I discovered that being a traveling salesman, on the road all the time, was no way to meet the kind of women I wanted to meet. My third objective was to have a good time! I had been a fairly successful salesman and quite frugal with my earnings....So, having fun, finding a girl, getting a degree—those were my objectives. If I was able to learn anything along the way, that would be purely incidental!" Andersen graduated from the University of Minnesota in 1931, with a degree in business administration.

== H. B. Fuller Company ==
By 1934, Andersen was growing dissatisfied with life as a traveling salesman. He heard through an associate that the H. B. Fuller Company in St. Paul, Minnesota, a manufacturer of school paste, was looking for someone to hire in sales promotion. Andersen discussed the position with the owner and president, Harvey B. Fuller Jr., and joined the company on October 8, 1934. Andersen managed sales for the H.B. Fuller Company over the next seven years until purchasing a controlling interest in the company in 1941 and taking over as president. Under his leadership, the firm became an early model of corporate responsibility, recognized for offering generous benefits to employees, their spouses, and retirees. Andersen's corporate philosophy was built around four priorities in a definite order. The highest priority was service to the customer. "Anything the customer wanted should be seen as an opportunity for us to provide it. Number two was that the company should exist deliberately for the benefit of the people associated in it. I never liked the word employee. It intimated a difference in class within a plant. We always used the word associate. Fuller's third priority was to make money. To survive, you have to make money. To grow, you need money. To conduct research and develop new products, you must have money. The need for money can be desperate at times. But corporations must put the quest for money in its proper place. Our philosophy did not leave out service to the larger community. We put it in fourth place, behind service to customers, our associates, and the bottom line. Community service cannot be paramount to a business, but it ought not to be omitted, as it too often is. Business must concern itself with the larger society—for reasons of self-interest if nothing else."

Under Andersen's guidance, Fuller grew from a small plant to an international Fortune 500 company. Its expansion strategy baffled the competition. Competitors thought the company was struggling to keep all the new plants afloat, but the opposite was true. Other leaders in the adhesives industry operated in New York City, Chicago, and San Francisco. "They had huge plants and big established investments. They could not start a new plant. What would they do with their big old plant? By comparison, we were popping around the country and setting up small plants in lively little markets. We kept our real estate costs down. We did not have large freight charges to pass on to the customer. National Adhesives, the biggest company in the industry, was very focused on making money. They maintained their prices at a high level, even when their share of the market dropped, in order to make more money. That was a blessing for little companies like Fuller."

In 1968, Fuller became a publicly traded company. By 1970, it had become an adhesives industry leader, with 27 plants and offices in the U.S. and ten in foreign countries. The goal Andersen had set decades before of doubling its sales volume every five years was still being met. In 1970, Fuller reached about $48 million in sales. Andersen retired as president and chief executive officer in 1974, at age 65, turning the company over to his eldest son, Tony.

== Dairy farm ==
In 1953, 12 years after becoming president of the H. B. Fuller Company, Andersen entered the dairy business, buying a farm held by his wife's family on Deer Lake, near St. Croix Falls, Wisconsin. It was the start of 35 years in the dairy business, with about 200 head of cattle. The herd was slowly converted to registered Holsteins. In 1984, Deer Lake Farm received the National Holstein Association's Progressive Breeder Award. Additional land was acquired in the 1950s, and environmental restoration projects were undertaken on the expanded farm. After Andersen moved out of the dairy business in 1988, 80 acres of land surrounding one of the ponds were placed in a land preserve to honor the memories of his wife's parents.

== ECM Publishers ==
In 1974, Andersen began a new career as a newspaper publisher and writer. He acquired two newspapers to form the Princeton Union-Eagle, which eventually became part of ECM Publishers, which published a number of weekly local newspapers and shoppers. Andersen wrote editorials for the ECM papers, many of which are gathered in Views from the Publisher's Desk (1997). His newspaper work gave him "more personal satisfaction than almost anything else I have done". His editorial goal was to make his readers think without telling them what to think. The Andersen family sold ECM to Adams Publishing Group in 2016.

== Politics ==
Andersen in 1957

A progressive Republican, Andersen served in the Minnesota legislature from 1949 to 1959. Among the many causes he championed were educational programs for exceptional children, recognition of alcoholism as a health problem, the Metropolitan Planning Commission in the Twin Cities, and the Fair Employment Practices Act (Minnesota was the fifth state to pass legislation on this issue). After the anti-discrimination bill passed, Andersen was greeted by an African-American, who told him that for the first time he felt like a "real man". Andersen described this moment as one of his most touching memories.

=== Governors of Minnesota ===
In 1960, Andersen ran for governor against incumbent Democrat Orville Freeman. In 1999, he said he decided to run after hearing Freeman wish he could again call the Minnesota National Guard to bust a strike at an Albert Lea meatpacking plant, after a federal judge blocked that decision. Andersen won by 22,879 votes. During his term, the common loon became the Minnesota state bird, several state parks were established, and the Taconite Amendment and fair housing legislation passed. He lost reelection two years later by the closest margin in U.S. history. The election was held on November 6, 1962, but the results were not known until March 21, 1963. After recounts and court challenges, it was determined that then-Lieutenant Governor Karl Rolvaag had defeated Andersen by 91 votes out of nearly 1.3 million cast, 619,842 to 619,751. On February 14, 1963, Andersen issued a statement that if he were reelected as governor, he would veto any right-to-work legislation disguised as "compulsory open shop legislation". Andersen believed that right-to-work laws would weaken Minnesota's labor movement and cause friction between workers and management.

Andersen remained in the Republican Party for the rest of his life, but he became unhappy about how conservative the party became. Even in the 1960s, his views were in the minority of the party. In a 2003 interview with the Saint Paul Pioneer Press, he said, "I remind people I want to be known as a liberal Republican. If that's a dirty word, so be it." In the 2004 presidential election, he endorsed Democratic nominee John Kerry over incumbent Republican President George W. Bush. He was so disenchanted with the Bush administration that he wrote a commentary in the Minneapolis Star Tribune claiming that Bush and Vice President Dick Cheney "spew outright untruths with evangelistic fervor" and calling Cheney an evil man who was the administration's real decision-maker. Unlike many other members of his party, Andersen opposed low taxes.

== University of Minnesota ==
Andersen served on the Board of Regents of the University of Minnesota from 1967 to 1975 and as chair from 1972 to 1975. From 1968 to 1988, he was a trustee of the University of Minnesota Foundation, presiding over it from 1978 to 1981. During the Minnesota Campaign, the university's major fundraising effort from 1985 to 1988, he played a major leadership role in what was, at the time, the most successful fundraising effort by any U.S. public university.

Andersen believed there was an additional mission to the three central missions—teaching, research, and community service—of the university: an archival one. The building housing the archives and special collections of the university's libraries is named for him, in recognition of his deep belief in that mission. On May 14, 1999, the university's Board of Regents unanimously voted to name the newest library in his honor. The Elmer L. Andersen Library opened in April 2000.

== Voyageurs National Park ==
One of Andersen's proudest achievements came in April 1975, when Congress passed legislation establishing Voyageurs National Park—thousands of acres of forests and lakes along Minnesota's northern border. Along with people like naturalist Sigurd Olson, legislator Willard Munger, and aviator Charles A. Lindbergh, Andersen devoted thousands of hours to persuading landowners, timber industry leaders, politicians, and citizens of the park's value to future generations. For his work, he is remembered as the "father of Voyageurs National Park".

"It is flattering to have been called the father of Voyageurs Park. I think that I made a difference. But so did many, many other people, more than I could possibly name, who kept the dream alive until it came to fruition. Some of the real heroes were people in the region who opposed their friends or employers to support the park. The park also had help from another real hero—Charles Lindbergh....Charles A. Lindbergh's name deserves a prominent place in the annals of Voyageurs National Park. The man who did so much for the development of aviation also did much for his home state, for the cause of wilderness preservation—and for me."

== Book collector ==
Andersen developed a passion for books as a child and collected them all his life. As a young traveling salesman, he saved his loose change and spent it on books. His hunt for books brought him into contact with dealers, other collectors, printers and librarians. He was well-acquainted with book and auction catalogues; paging through them became a welcome break in a busy day. Andersen bought books with a purpose, to build a library. He intended to read them, know them well, catalog them, and care for them. American and English history and literature and inspirational poetry were of particular interest to him, but as his interests expanded so did his reading and his library. When he came to Minnesota, he became interested in the state's history. When he learned more about fine printing and printers, he turned to William Morris and the Kelmscott Press. And when he discovered something new, like the Whittington Press, he made sure that the University of Minnesota owned the printer's entire archive.

While writing his Princeton Union-Eagle editorials, Andersen wrote a column on book collecting using the name Arne Kjelsberg, his father's first two names. He did not reveal his authorship of the column for many years, though a close friend guessed. Andersen was a longtime member of the bibliophilic Ampersand Club, and his Arne Kjelsberg articles were published the year after his death in honor of the club's 75th anniversary, in 2005. Compilation of the volume commenced while Andersen lived, and he expressed hope to attend its publication party.

Andersen's wife supported his bibliomania. Together, their book buying was intimately connected with book giving and support for libraries and reading. Public libraries around the state and other book concerns benefited from their support and interest. They were major benefactors of the University of Minnesota and its libraries. Much of the collection at the Andersen Horticultural Library at the Minnesota Landscape Arboretum, which bears Andersen's name, is a result of their generosity. The gift of his personal library of 12,500 rare volumes in March 1999 was described in the Minneapolis Star Tribune as "a gift of the heart."

== Personal life and legacy ==
Andersen met Eleanor Anne Johnson (1911–2011) at Grace University Lutheran Church while they were both students. She was the eldest child of Gustav A. and Elizabeth Johnson, both Swedish immigrants. The Andersens married on September 1, 1932. Eleanor's sister Edith Johnson later married future Minnesota Senator Stanley W. Holmquist. The Andersens settled in the Twin Cities. Eleanor decided to leave the university when they were married and postpone the completion of her degree. Andersen credited his wife for many of his accomplishments. They had three children. Several years later, Eleanor Andersen earned her bachelor's degree.

Andersen wrote a number of books, including his autobiography, A Man's Reach; a collection of newspaper articles, Views from the Publisher's Desk; a collection of speeches and reflections, I Trust to Be Believed; and Elmer's Tour, a guide to the Minnesota state capitol building.

The Elmer L. and Eleanor J. Andersen Foundation was founded in 1957.

Andersen died in Minneapolis on November 15, 2004, just months after a gala celebration of his 95th birthday at the Elmer L. Andersen Library. The library is the home of archives and special collections. Andersen was the last living former U.S. governor born in the 1900s decade. The Minnesota Department of Human Services Building in St. Paul is also named for him.

== See also ==
- Minnesota's congressional delegations

== Other sources ==
- Andersen, Elmer L. (1997) Views from the Publisher's Desk (Nodin Press LLC) ISBN 978-0931714733
- Andersen, Elmer L. (2004) Man's Reach (University of Minnesota Press ) ISBN 978-0816637393
- Andersen, Elmer L. (2004) I Trust to Be Believed (Nodin Press LLC) ISBN 978-1932472073
- Andersen, Elmer L. (2005) Elmer's Tour: A Former Governor's Loving Look at the Minnesota State Capitol (Nodin Press LLC) ISBN 978-1932472387

Party political offices
Preceded by George MacKinnon	Republican nominee for Governor of Minnesota; 1960, 1962	Succeeded by Harold LeVander
Political offices
Preceded by Orville Freeman	Governor of Minnesota; 1961–1963	Succeeded by Karl Rolvaag
Honorary titles
Preceded by Frank Morrison	Oldest living U.S. governor April 19, 2004 – November 15, 2004	Succeeded by Albert Rosellini
