= Robert W. Mattson Sr. =

American politician

Robert W. (Bob) Mattson Sr.
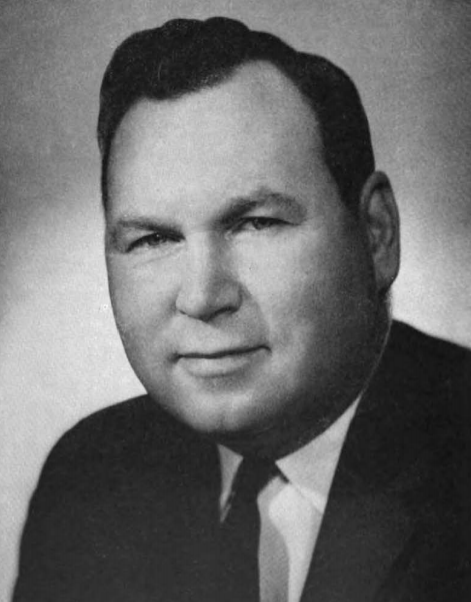

24th Minnesota Attorney General
- In office December 30, 1964 – January 2, 1967
- Governor: Karl F. Rolvaag
- Preceded by: Walter F. Mondale
- Succeeded by: Douglas M. Head

Personal details
- Born: August 26, 1924 Virginia, Minnesota, U.S.
- Died: March 14, 1982 (aged 57) Olmsted County, Minnesota, U.S.
- Party: Democratic-Farmer-Labor Party

Robert William (Bob) Mattson Sr. (August 26, 1924 – March 14, 1982) was an American army veteran, lawyer, and politician in Minnesota, where he was the state Attorney General from 1964 to 1967. He was a member of the Democratic-Farmer-Labor Party.

Mattson attended public schools in the Minnesota Iron Range city of Virginia, where he was born in 1924. He served in the U.S. Army in WWII and received the Purple Heart for wounds received in France. Upon return to his home town, Mattson was active in the Disabled American Veterans and was named first commander of the local chapter.

Mattson attended Carleton College and was a graduate of the University of Minnesota Law School. He served as Deputy and Chief Deputy Attorney General under Miles W. Lord before entering private legal practice in Minneapolis in 1961.

In 1964, Mattson was appointed Attorney General by Governor Karl F. Rolvaag to fill the remaining two years of Walter F. Mondale's term upon Mondale's appointment to the U.S. Senate to fill the vacancy created by Hubert H. Humphrey's election as Vice President of the United States. He did not seek re-election and returned to the private practice of law in 1967.

Mattson, who was of Finnish descent, married Shirley Kunze of Chisholm, Minnesota. Together they raised four children, Bob Jr., Susan, Marsha and Polly. Their son, Robert W. Mattson Jr., served as Minnesota State Auditor and Treasurer. Mattson died of an abdominal infection in 1982.

Legal offices
Preceded by Walter Mondale	Minnesota Attorney General; 1964–1967	Succeeded by Douglas M. Head
