= Replogle (name) =

Replogle is a surname. According to the 2010 United States Census, Replogle is the 14312^{nd} most common surname in the United States, belonging to 2091 individuals. Replogle is most common among White (94.74%) individuals. People with the name include:

- Adam Replogle (born 1990), an American former professional football player
- Andy Replogle (1953 – 2012), an American Major League Baseball player
- J. Leonard Replogle (1876 – 1948), a wealthy American industrialist
- John Replogle, a businessman
- Luther Replogle (1902 − 1981), the founder of the globe manufacturer Replogle Globes
- Michael Replogle, an advisor in the field of sustainable transport
- Todd Replogle (born 1969), an American video game programmer

== See also ==
- Replogle tube, a medical device
- Replogle Gold Bug, a homebuilt aircraft
