= A Man's Reach =

Autobiography of Elmer L. Andersen

A Man's Reach is an autobiography by Elmer Andersen, the former governor of Minnesota, published by the University of Minnesota Press in 2000.

== Criticism ==
“Andersen’s story is the Horatio Alger myth made real, but his life is about much more than money and politics. He believes in public service, in democracy, and in striving to meet the needs of all citizens, especially those in the worst circumstances. Andersen’s strong faith and values resonate from the first page of this autobiography. His writing is honest, personable, straightforward, portraying both the personal rigor and thoughtfulness of his business and newspaper careers.” —St. Paul Pioneer Press

"A Man's Reach is a book that warms the heart and should inspire any reader to be a better person. It's also the detailed account of the life of a very successful businessman, politician, and most important, a great humanitarian. . . . It's simply but forcefully told, it's shrewd, and it's quietly humorous and warm." —Dave Wood's Book Report
