= 1956 Minnesota lieutenant gubernatorial election =

- November 6, 1956
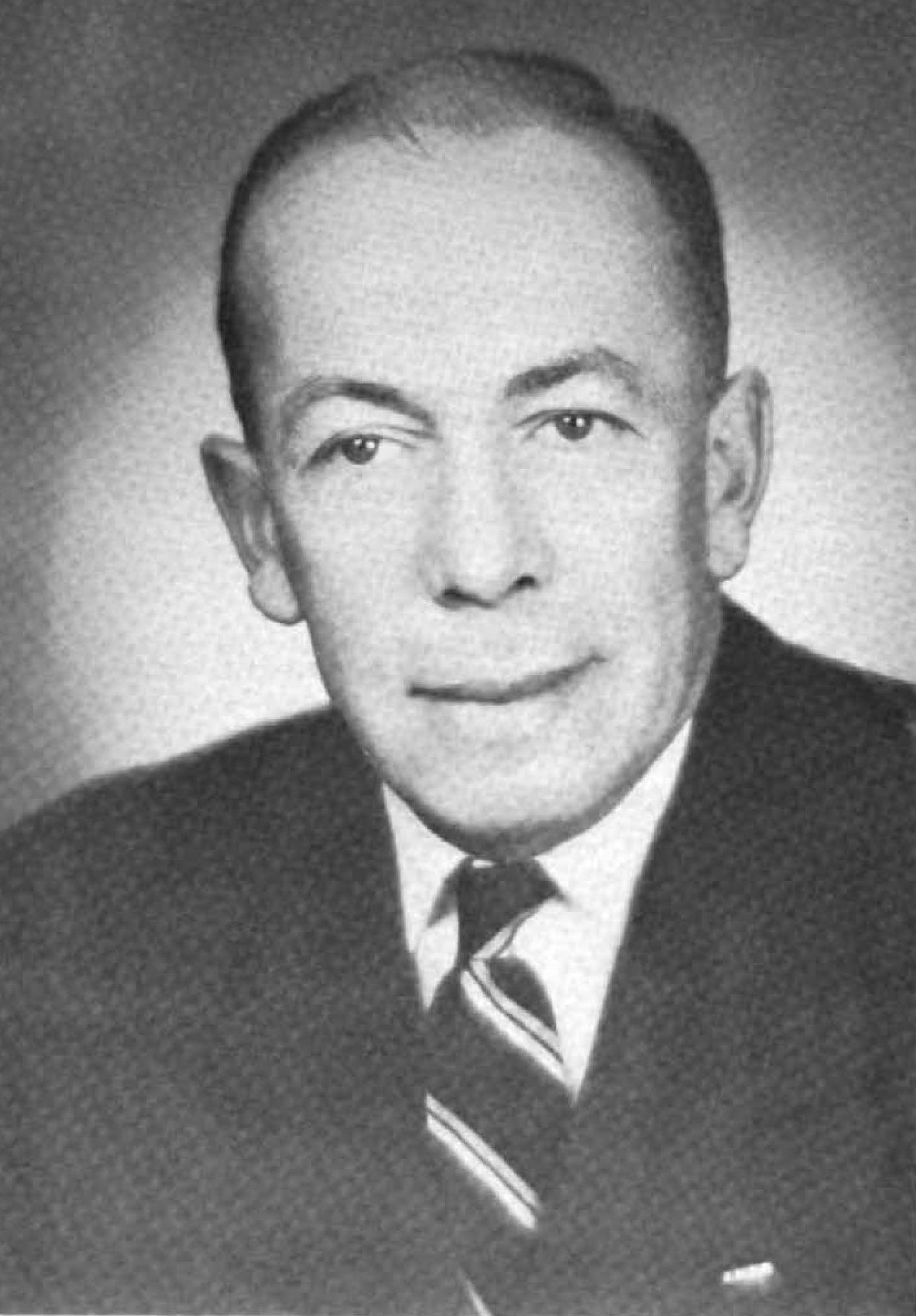

| Nominee | Karl Rolvaag | Leonard R. Dickinson |
| Party | Democratic (DFL) | Republican |
| Popular vote | 725,800 | 653,353 |
| Percentage | 52.63% | 47.37% |
- County results Rolvaag: 50–60% 60–70% 70–80% Dickinson: 50–60% 60–70%
Lieutenant Governor before election
Karl Rolvaag
Democratic (DFL)
Elected Lieutenant Governor
Karl Rolvaag
Democratic (DFL)

The 1956 Minnesota lieutenant gubernatorial election took place on November 6, 1956. Incumbent Lieutenant Governor Karl Rolvaag of the Minnesota Democratic-Farmer-Labor Party defeated Republican Party of Minnesota challenger Leonard R. Dickinson.

== Results ==
1956 lieutenant gubernatorial election, Minnesota
| Party | Candidate | Votes | % | ±% |
|---|---|---|---|---|
| Democratic (DFL) | Karl Rolvaag (incumbent) | 725,800 | 52.63% | +0.22% |
| Republican | Leonard R. Dickinson | 653,353 | 47.37% | −0.22% |
| Majority | | 72,447 | 5.26% | |
| Turnout | | 1,379,153 | | |
| Democratic (DFL) hold | | Swing | | |
