= 1960 Minnesota lieutenant gubernatorial election =

- November 8, 1960
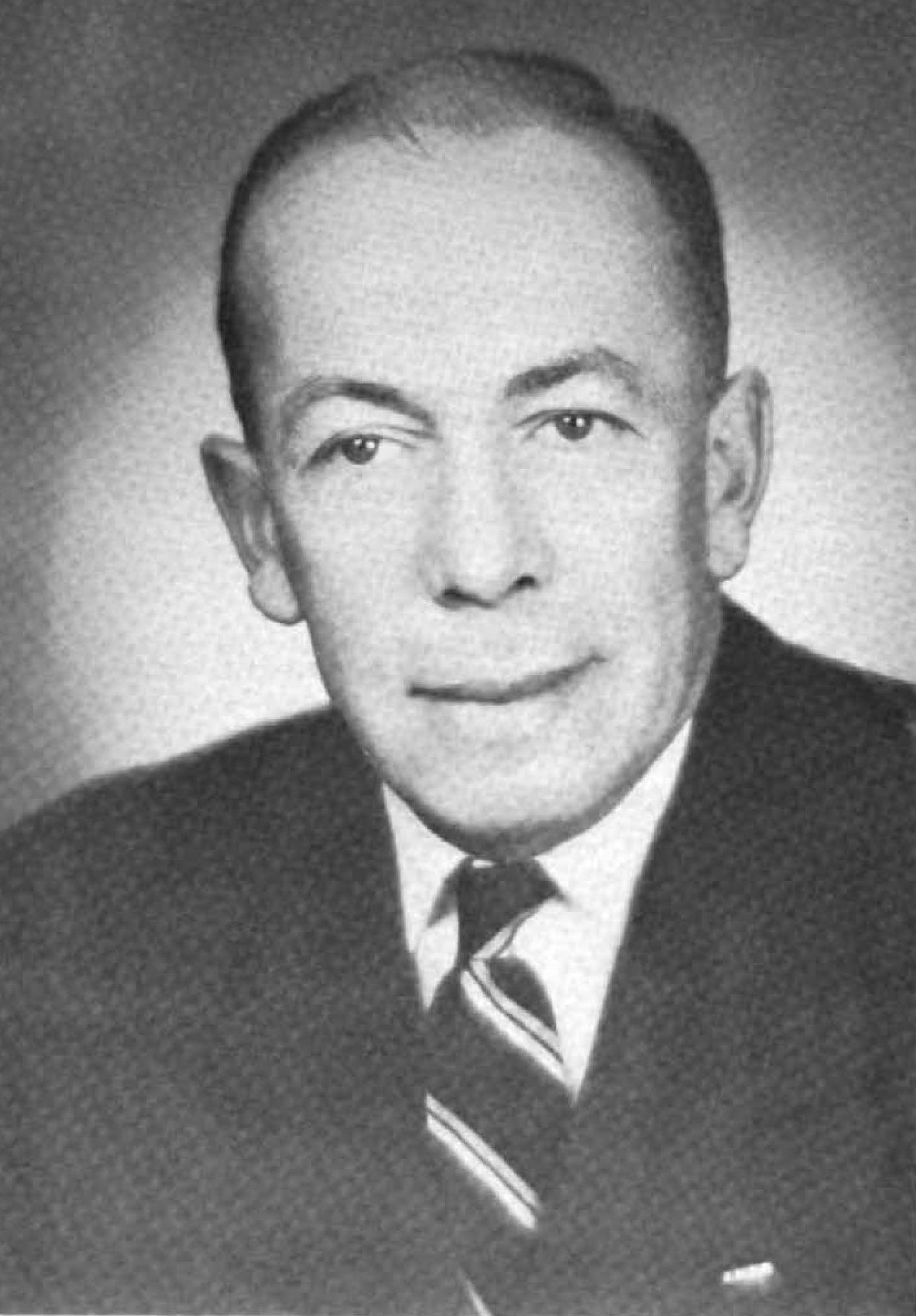

Nominee	Karl Rolvaag	Art Ogle
Party	Democratic (DFL)	Republican
Popular vote	822,923	671,482
Percentage	55.07%	44.93%
- County results Rolvaag: 50–60% 60–70% 70–80% Ogle: 50–60% 60–70%
Lieutenant Governor before election
Karl Rolvaag
Democratic (DFL)
Elected Lieutenant Governor
Karl Rolvaag
Democratic (DFL)

The 1960 Minnesota lieutenant gubernatorial election took place on November 8, 1960. Incumbent Lieutenant Governor Karl Rolvaag of the Minnesota Democratic-Farmer-Labor Party defeated Republican Party of Minnesota challenger Art Ogle.

== Results ==
1960 lieutenant gubernatorial election, Minnesota
Party	Candidate	Votes	%	±%
Democratic (DFL)	Karl Rolvaag (incumbent)	822,923	55.07%	−3.03
Republican	Art Ogle	671,482	44.93%	+3.03
Majority		151,441	10.14%	
Turnout		1,494,405		
Democratic (DFL) hold		Swing		
