= 1962 Minnesota gubernatorial election =

- November 6, 1962
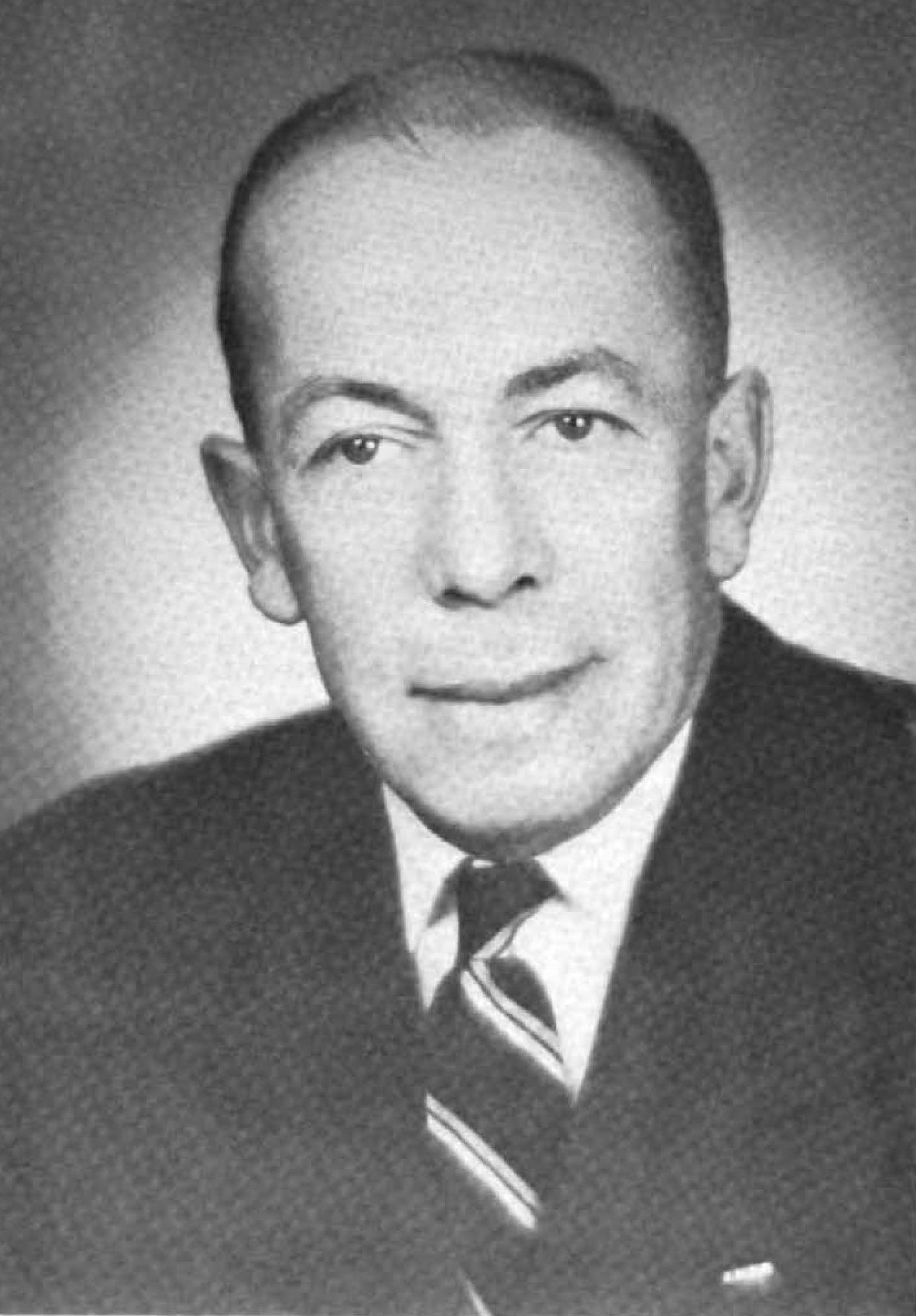

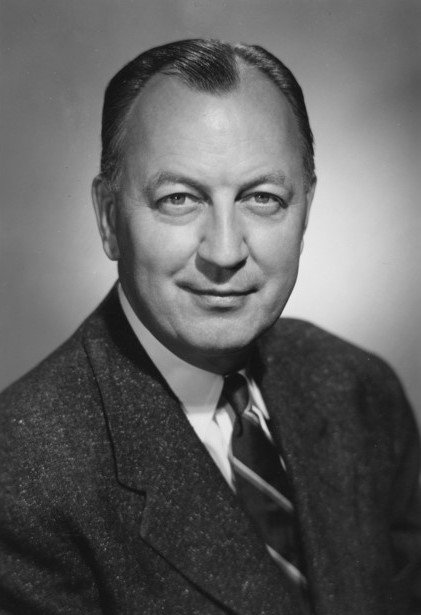
Nominee	Karl Rolvaag	Elmer Andersen
Party	Democratic (DFL)	Republican
Popular vote	619,842	619,751
Percentage	49.713%	49.706%
- County results Rolvaag: 40–50% 50–60% 60–70% Andersen: 40–50% 50–60% 60–70%
Governor before election
Elmer Andersen
Republican
Elected Governor
Karl Rolvaag
Democratic (DFL)

The 1962 Minnesota gubernatorial election was the closest statewide race in Minnesota history and one of the closest gubernatorial elections in U.S. history. The election was held on November 6, 1962, but the results were not known until March 21, 1963. The vote count after election day had Governor Elmer L. Andersen in the lead by 142 votes. Then-Lieutenant Governor Karl Rolvaag went to court and won the right to a recount. After the recount, it was determined that Rolvaag had defeated Andersen by 91 votes out of over 1.2 million cast. He received 619,842 votes to Andersen's 619,751. The previous closest gubernatorial election was the state's first, in 1857.

At the time, governors and lieutenant governors were elected on separate ballots. Andersen was a Republican and Rolvaag a DFLer. The 1962 election was also the first four-year term election for Minnesota governor.

== Republican primary ==
=== Candidates ===
==== Nominated ====
- Elmer Andersen, incumbent

=== Results ===
Republican party primary results
Party	Candidate	Votes	%
Republican	Elmer Andersen	275,351	100%
Total votes		275,351	100%

== Democratic-Farmer-Labor primary ==
=== Candidates ===
==== Nominated ====
- Karl Rolvaag, lieutenant governor

==== Eliminated in primary ====
- Col. Belmont Tudisco, World War II veteran, painter

=== Results ===
Democratic-Farmer-Labor Party primary results
Party	Candidate	Votes	%
Democratic (DFL)	Karl Rolvaag	271,818	92.50%
Democratic (DFL)	Belmont Tudisco	22,042	7.50%
Total votes		293,860	100%

== General election ==
=== Candidates ===
- Elmer Andersen, incumbent (Republican)
- William Braatz, carpenter (Industrial Government)
- Karl Rolvaag, lieutenant governor (DFL)

=== Campaigns ===
Polls prior to the election showed Andersen leading over Rolvaag, but only slightly. It was predicted to be a close race.

=== Disputed results ===
Andersen described what followed election day as "a seesaw affair", as candidates traded first place during the various counts and recounts. The "seesawing returns" were unofficial. Once time came for official results to be released, there was still no consensus winner. A five-member committee of three Republicans and two DFLers was assembled in late November, but reached no agreement. The Minnesota Supreme Court was asked for the next course of action. The Court ordered the State Canvassing board to collect official returns and review all collected returns. On November 29, after amending faulty vote counts from ten counties, the board declared Andersen the victor, by 142 votes.

On December 3, Rolvaag filed a motion in the District of Minnesota court for a recount. The State Supreme Court once again intervened, appointing three judges to oversee the recount. Andersen's Chief of Staff, Thomas H. Swain, was put in charge of the recount. Mary Lou Klas was named as a pro-Rolvaag observer for Swain. All 800,000 paper ballots were manually recounted, and verified by a Republican, a DFLer, and a nonpartisan observer before being officially counted. Either partisan observer could challenge a ballot if they believed it to have been tampered with. 97,000 ballots were challenged. All challenged ballots were individually reviewed, and 3,851 were found to have credible evidence of tampering. Inauguration day passed, and Andersen remained governor while the counting continued. The legislature came into session and began operating normally.

In February 1963, the matter was again brought to the courts, with the three judges appointed to oversee the process conducting a full review of the recount and review process. On March 15, 1963, the final results were announced, with Rolvaag ahead by 91 votes. On March 21, Rolvaag was officially named governor-elect. On March 25, 1963, he took office. Andersen accepted the results and did not appeal. This recount procedure was used as a template for future contentious elections, notably in the 2008 Senate race, which was decided by 312 votes.

== Results ==
1962 gubernatorial election, Minnesota
Party	Candidate	Votes	%	±%
Democratic (DFL)	Karl Rolvaag	619,842	49.71%	+0.63%
Republican	Elmer Andersen (incumbent)	619,751	49.71%	−0.85%
Industrial Government	William Braatz	7,234	0.58%	+0.22%
Majority		91	0.01%	
Turnout		1,246,827		
Democratic (DFL) gain from Republican		Swing		

== See also ==
- List of Minnesota gubernatorial elections
