= Swedehome, Nebraska =

Unincorporated community in Polk County, Nebraska, United States

- Unincorporated community
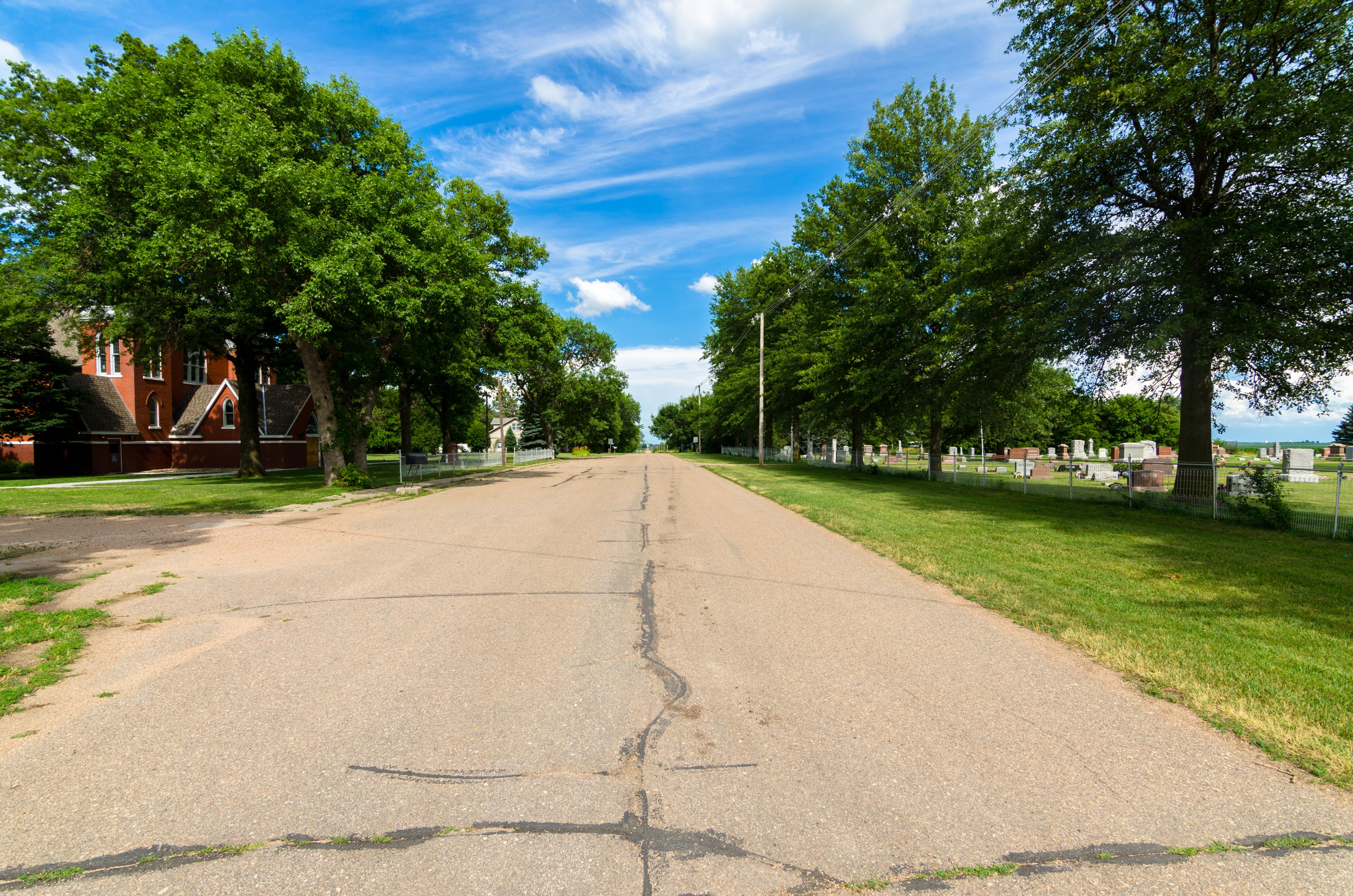
- Swedehome, July 2017

- Location within the state of Nebraska
- Coordinates: 41°09′46″N 97°39′49″W
- Country: United States
- State: Nebraska
- County: Polk
- Elevation: 1,719 ft (524 m)
- Time zone: UTC-6 (Central (CST))
  - Summer (DST): UTC-5 (CDT)
- ZIP code: 68651
- FIPS code: 31-48130
- GNIS feature ID: 833993

Swedehome (also written Swede Home) is an unincorporated community in Polk County, Nebraska, United States.

== History ==
A post office was established at Swedehome in 1883, and remained in operation until it was discontinued in 1902. Swedehome was originally built up chiefly by Swedes.

== Notable person ==
- Harold LeVander, Governor of Minnesota, was born in Swedehome.
