= Leonard R. Dickinson =

American politician

Leonard Ralph Dickinson (December 19, 1898 – March 13, 1994) was an American businessman and politician.

Dickinson was born in Turtle Lake Township, Beltrami County, Minnesota. He lived in Bemidji, Minnesota with his wife and family and was the owner of Dickinson Lumber Company. Dickinson served in the Minnesota Senate from 1951 to 1954 and in the Minnesota House of Representatives from 1943 to 1950 and from 1961 to 1968. He was a Republican. He died at Beltrami Nursing Home in Bemidji, Minnesota from heart failure. The funeral and burial was in Bemidji, Minnesota.

Party political offices
Preceded by P. Kenneth Peterson	Republican nominee for Lieutenant Governor of Minnesota; 1956	Succeeded by Bernard Ericsson
