= 1958 Minnesota lieutenant gubernatorial election =

- November 4, 1958
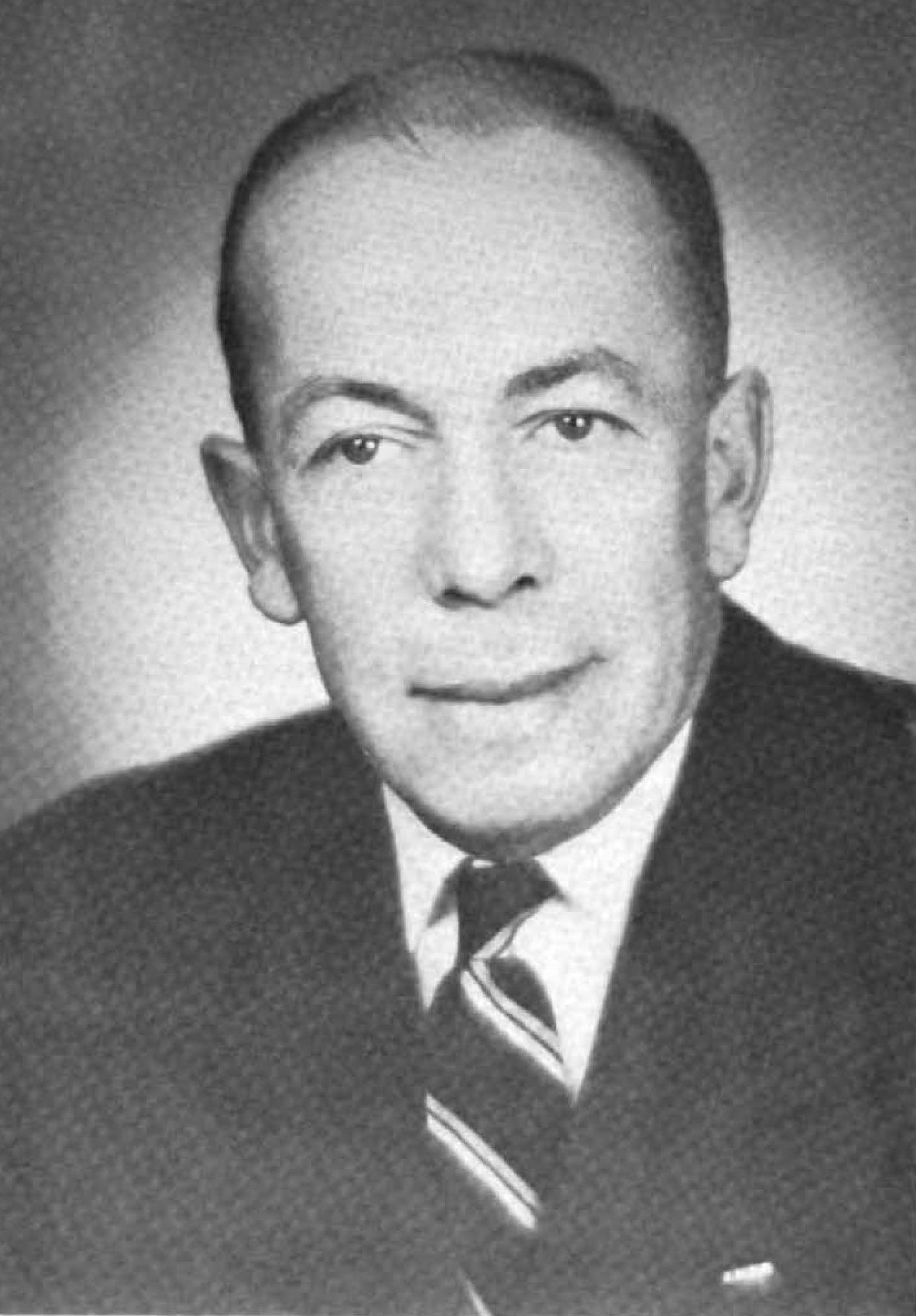

Nominee	Karl Rolvaag	Bernard Ericsson
Party	Democratic (DFL)	Republican
Popular vote	648,941	468,071
Percentage	58.1%	41.9%
- County results Rolvaag: 50–60% 60–70% 70–80% Ericsson: 50–60% 60–70%
Lieutenant Governor before election
Karl Rolvaag
Democratic (DFL)
Elected Lieutenant Governor
Karl Rolvaag
Democratic (DFL)

The 1958 Minnesota lieutenant gubernatorial election took place on November 4, 1958. Incumbent Lieutenant Governor Karl Rolvaag of the Minnesota Democratic-Farmer-Labor Party defeated Republican Party of Minnesota challenger Bernard E. Ericsson.

== Results ==
1958 lieutenant gubernatorial election, Minnesota
Party	Candidate	Votes	%	±%
Democratic (DFL)	Karl Rolvaag (incumbent)	648,941	58.10%	+5.47%
Republican	Bernard E. Ericsson	468,071	41.90%	−5.47%
Majority		180,870	16.20%	
Turnout		1,117,012		
Democratic (DFL) hold		Swing		
