= 1966 Minnesota gubernatorial election =

- November 8, 1966
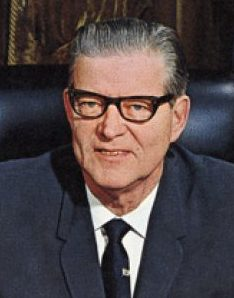

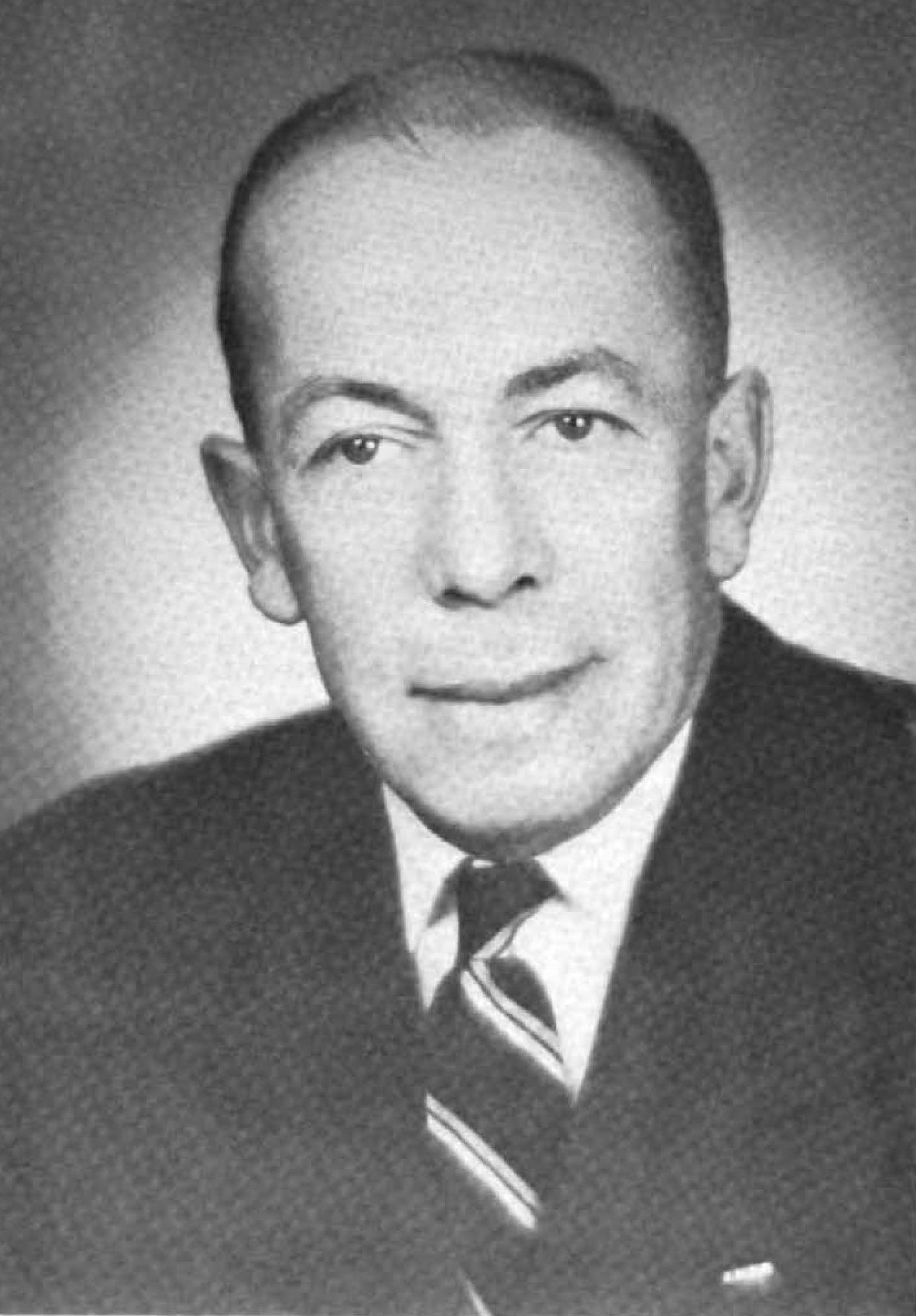
Nominee	Harold LeVander	Karl Rolvaag
Party	Republican	Democratic (DFL)
Popular vote	680,593	607,943
Percentage	52.55%	46.94%
- County results LeVander: 40–50% 50–60% 60–70% Rolvaag: 50–60% 60–70%
Governor before election
Karl Rolvaag
Democratic (DFL)
Elected Governor
Harold LeVander
Republican

The 1966 Minnesota gubernatorial election took place on November 8, 1966. Republican challenger Harold LeVander defeated Minnesota Democratic–Farmer–Labor Party (DFL) incumbent Karl Rolvaag.

LeVander took advantage of the weakened DFL, which was dealing with crippling factionalism.

== Democratic-Farmer-Labor primary ==
The primary election was held on September 13. The DFL held an internal election for who the party leadership would support in the primary on June 19. However, governor Rolvaag found support within his party dwindling. Rolvaag, despite support from political ally and former governor Orville Freeman, was unable to convince much of the DFL leadership of his ability, most importantly Hubert Humphrey, who had led the party's right since its founding. Amid a short list of achievements, and Rolvaag's worsening alcoholism, the DFL endorsed Alexander Keith for the nomination after a 20-ballot election. Undeterred, Rolvaag entered the DFL's primary with a cry of "Let the people decide!" Rolvaag continued his re-election campaign, and won the nomination.

Keith conceded defeat in the primary election before the full election returns were even counted, due to his massive underperformance. The primary demonstrated the collapse of the control of the party's right-wing, with Humphrey's chosen candidate defeated resoundingly.

=== Candidates ===
==== Nominated ====
- Karl Rolvaag, incumbent

==== Eliminated in primary ====
- Jerome Daly, attorney and conspiracy theorist
- Alexander Keith, lieutenant governor
- Cyrus Magnusson, former state insurance commissioner (Note: Removed and indicted by the federal government on October 29, 1965 for mail fraud, wire fraud, and conspiracy)
- John C. Peterson
- Col. Belmont Tudisco, World War II veteran, painter

=== Results ===
Democratic-Farmer-Labor Party primary results
Party	Candidate	Votes	%
Democratic (DFL)	Karl Rolvaag	336,656	66.27%
Democratic (DFL)	Alexander Keith	157,661	31.04%
Democratic (DFL)	John C. Peterson	5,193	1.02%
Democratic (DFL)	Cyrus Magnusson	3,704	0.73%
Democratic (DFL)	Jerome Daly	3,255	0.64%
Democratic (DFL)	Belmont Tudisco	1,537	0.30%
Total votes		508,006	100%

== Republican primary ==
The Republican Party held an internal race for who the party's endorsement in the primary would be. LeVander defeated Pillsbury after sixteen ballots. Pillsbury then withdrew from the race.

=== Candidates ===
==== Nominated ====
- Harold LeVander, Macalester College professor, attorney

==== Eliminated in primary ====
- Lorna Tarnowski

==== Withdrew ====
- John Sargent Pillsbury Jr., attorney

=== Results ===
Republican party primary results
Party	Candidate	Votes	%
Republican	Harold LeVander	276,403	97.94%
Republican	Lorna Tarnowski	5,827	2.06%
Total votes		282,230	100%

== Candidates ==
- Harold LeVander, Macalester College professor, attorney (Republican)
- Karl Rolvaag, incumbent (DFL)
- Kenneth Sachs (Industrial Government)

== Results ==
1966 gubernatorial election, Minnesota
Party	Candidate	Votes	%	±%
Republican	Harold LeVander	680,593	52.55%	+2.85%
Democratic (DFL)	Karl Rolvaag (incumbent)	607,943	46.94%	−2.77%
Industrial Government	Kenneth Sachs	6,522	0.50%	−0.08%
Majority		72,650	5.61%	
Turnout		1,295,058		
Republican gain from Democratic (DFL)		Swing		
