= James B. Goetz =

American radio broadcaster and politician (1936–2019)

James Goetz
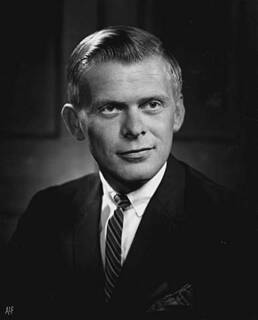
- Goetz in 1966

38th Lieutenant Governor of Minnesota
- In office January 2, 1967 – January 4, 1971
- Governor: Harold LeVander
- Preceded by: Alexander M. Keith
- Succeeded by: Rudy Perpich

Personal details
- Born: May 28, 1936 Freeport, Illinois, U.S.
- Died: March 17, 2019 (aged 82) Naples, Florida, U.S.
- Party: Republican
- Spouse: Ruth Elbert
- Profession: radio executive

James 'Jim' Burton Goetz (May 28, 1936 – March 17, 2019) was a radio broadcaster and Minnesota Republican politician. He served as the 38th lieutenant governor of Minnesota from January 2, 1967, to January 4, 1971. He owned the KAGE (now KGSL) radio station in Winona, Minnesota.

Goetz was born in Freeport, Illinois. In his adult life, he lived in Winona, Minnesota.

He retired to Naples, Florida with his wife and family. He died in Naples, Florida at the age of 82 with his family by his side.

Party political offices
Preceded by C. Donald Peterson	Republican nominee for Lieutenant Governor of Minnesota; 1966	Succeeded by Ben Boo
Political offices
Preceded by Alexander M. Keith	38th Lieutenant Governor of Minnesota; 1967–1971	Succeeded by Rudy Perpich
