= C. Donald Peterson =

American judge (1918–1987)

Carl Donald Peterson (February 2, 1918 – December 19, 1987) was an American jurist and politician.

Born in Minneapolis, Minnesota, Peterson received his bachelor's degree from the University of Minnesota and his law degree from the University of Illinois. He served in the United States Army Air Forces during World War II and as a judge advocate in the United States Air Force stationed in Japan during the Korea War. Peterson served in the Minnesota House of Representatives from 1959 to 1963 and was a Republican. Peterson served on the Minnesota Supreme Court for 19 years, from 1967 until 1987. Peterson died of cancer in Edina, Minnesota on December 19, 1987. His brother P. Kenneth Peterson also served in the Minnesota Legislature and as mayor of Minneapolis, while his daughter Barbara Peterson was crowned Miss USA 1976.

== Notes ==
Party political offices
Preceded by Art Ogle	Republican nominee for Lieutenant Governor of Minnesota; 1962	Succeeded by James B. Goetz
