= Replogle Globes =

American globe manufacturer

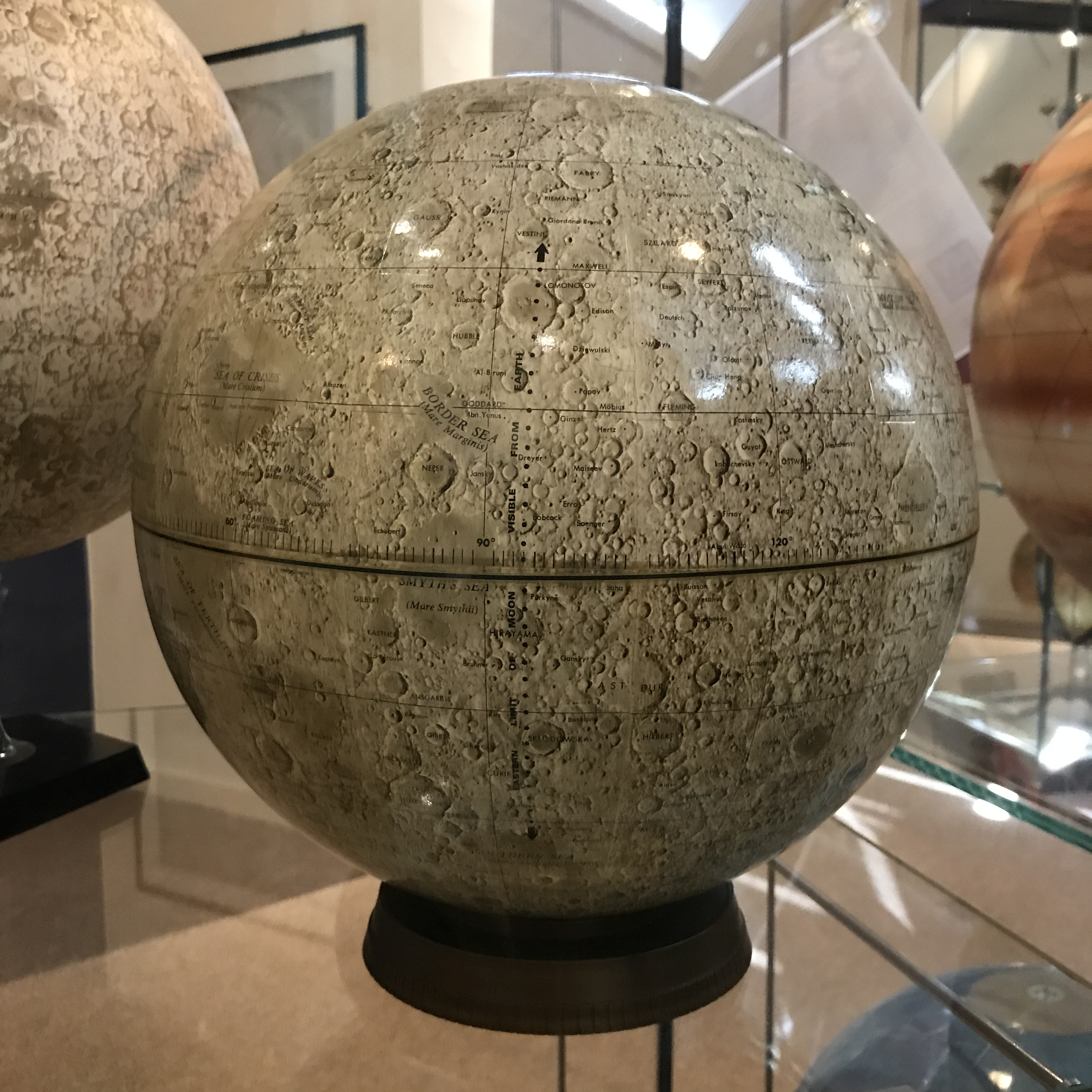
- Lunar globe by Replogle at the Whipple Museum of the History of Science
- Founded: 1930; 96 years ago in Chicago, USA
- Headquarters: United States

Replogle is the world's largest manufacturer of globes.

== History ==
Replogle Globes was started by Luther Replogle (1902-1981) when, in 1930, he began selling globes which he crafted by hand in his apartment in Chicago, using maps from England. His vision was to make globes a common feature in people's households, rather than something found only in academic settings. In 1959, Replogle Globes was purchased by Meredith Corporation and Luther Replogle co-founded Scanglobe in 1963. The William C. Nickels family bought Replogle in 1973 and made it suitable for every room. After Luther Replogle's death in 1981, Replogle Globes purchased Scanglobe's remaining interest in 1988, and moved the company to the United States in 2003 as a Replogle brand.

== Products ==
Replogle makes metal globes, light-up globes (in glass [vintage], cardboard, and plastic), inflatable plastic globes, transparent globes, a cube-shaped globe, and a variety of globe stands. In addition to globes of Earth, Replogle also makes globes of Venus, Mars, the Moon, and the celestial sphere.
