= Douglas M. Head =

American politician

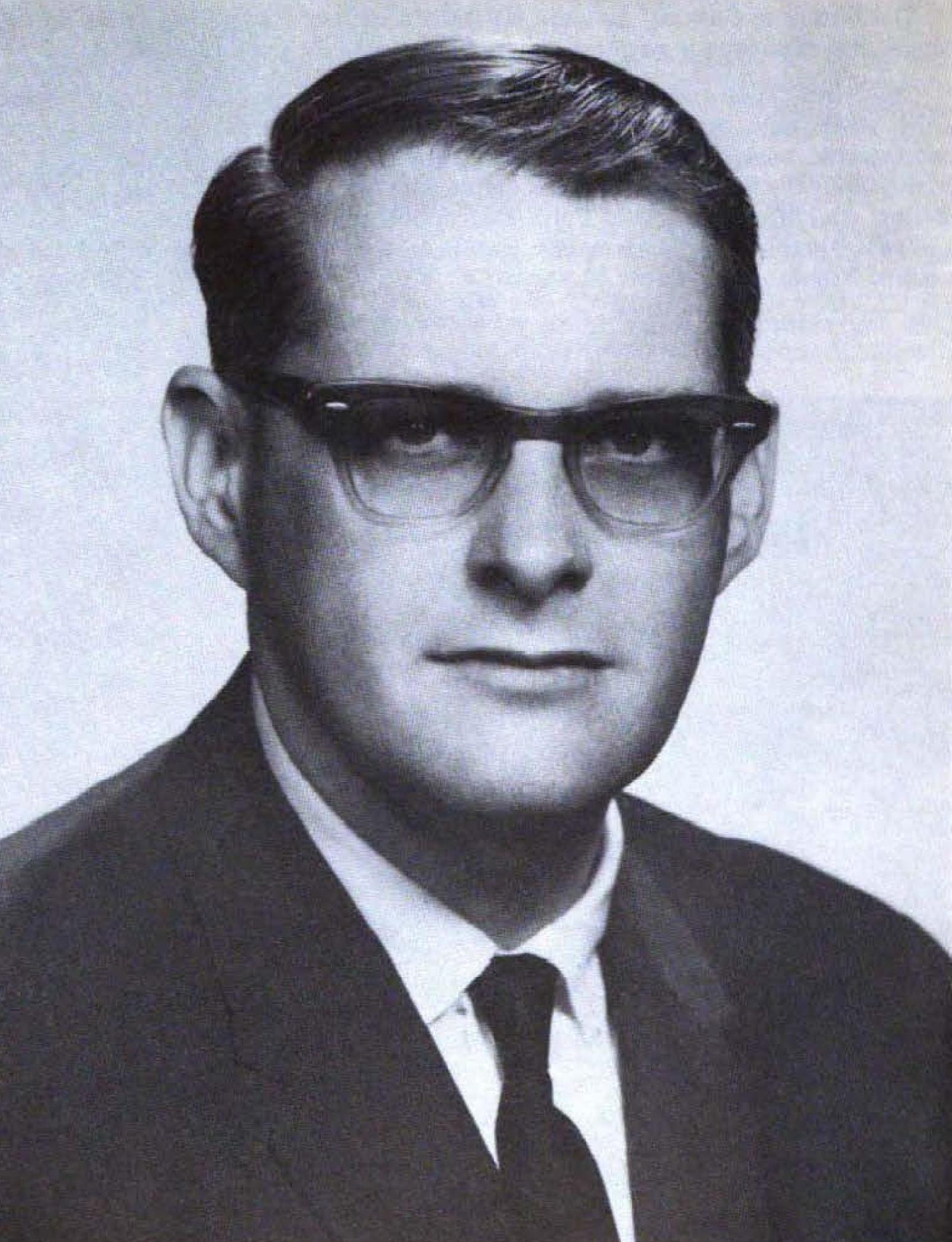

25th Attorney General of Minnesota
- In office January 2, 1967 – January 4, 1971
- Governor: Harold LeVander
- Preceded by: Robert W. Mattson, Sr.
- Succeeded by: Warren Spannaus

Member of the Minnesota House of Representatives
- In office 1961–1964

Personal details
- Born: April 14, 1930 Minneapolis, Minnesota, U.S.
- Died: February 2, 2011 (aged 80) Minneapolis, Minnesota, U.S.
- Party: Republican
- Profession: Attorney, Businessman

Douglas Michael Head (April 14, 1930 – February 2, 2011) was an American lawyer and politician who served as the 25th Attorney General of Minnesota. As of 2024, Head remains the most recent Republican to have held the office.

== Early life and education ==
Born in Minneapolis, Minnesota, Head graduated with a Bachelor of Arts from Yale University and an LL.B. from the University of Minnesota Law School, where he graduated in 1956 along with classmate and future Attorney General Walter Mondale.

== Career ==
Passing the bar in 1957, he was elected to the Minnesota House of Representatives and served from 1961 to 1964. He was elected Attorney General in 1966 and assumed office on January 2, 1967, serving until January 4, 1971. To date, he is the last Republican-elected Attorney General of Minnesota.

Head was an unsuccessful candidate for Governor of Minnesota in the 1970 election, losing to the DFL nominee, Wendell Anderson. In 1971, along with former Minnesota Solicitor General Jerome D. Truhn, he co-founded the law firm Head & Truhn (now Head, Seifert & Vander Weide).

Head died on February 2, 2011, from natural causes at his home in Minneapolis. He was 80 years old.

Party political offices
Preceded by Robert Lowe Kunzig	Republican nominee for Attorney General of Minnesota; 1966	Succeeded by Robert Forsythe
Preceded by Harold LeVander	Republican nominee for Governor of Minnesota; 1970	Succeeded by John Warren Johnson
Legal offices
Preceded by Robert W. Mattson, Sr.	Minnesota Attorney General; 1967–1971	Succeeded by Warren Spannaus
