= Sandy Keith =

American politician and jurist (1928–2020)

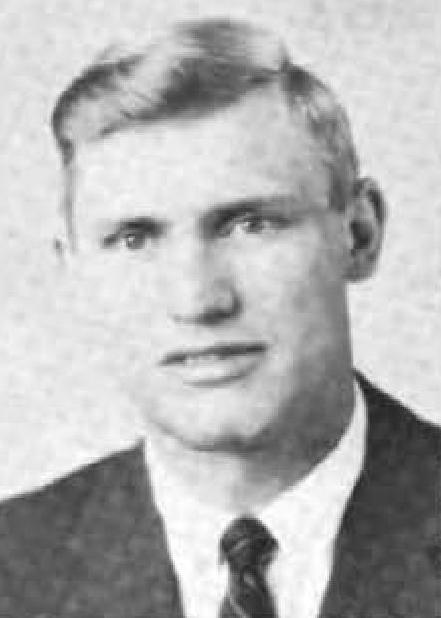
- Keith in 1961

Chief Justice of the Minnesota Supreme Court
- In office December 1, 1990 – January 29, 1998
- Appointed by: Rudy Perpich
- Preceded by: Peter S. Popovich
- Succeeded by: Kathleen A. Blatz

Associate Justice of the Minnesota Supreme Court
- In office February 1, 1989 – December 1, 1990
- Appointed by: Rudy Perpich

37th Lieutenant Governor of Minnesota
- In office January 8, 1963 – January 2, 1967
- Governor: Elmer L. Andersen; Karl Rolvaag
- Preceded by: Karl Rolvaag
- Succeeded by: James B. Goetz

Member of the Minnesota Senate from the 4th district
- In office January 6, 1959 – January 7, 1963
- Preceded by: Walter Burdick
- Succeeded by: Harold G. Krieger

Personal details
- Born: Alexander MacDonald Keith; November 22, 1928 Rochester, Minnesota, U.S.
- Died: October 3, 2020 (aged 91)
- Party: Democratic (DFL)
- Spouse: Marion E. Sanford
- Education: Amherst College; Yale Law School

Alexander MacDonald "Sandy" Keith (November 22, 1928 – October 3, 2020) was an American politician and jurist who was the first person to hold office in each of the three branches of Minnesota state government, serving as state senator, the 37th lieutenant governor of Minnesota, and as an associate justice and later chief justice of the Minnesota Supreme Court.

== Early life ==
Keith was born in Rochester, Minnesota, to Norman M. Keith and Edna (Alexander) Keith. His father was a physician who practiced medicine at the Mayo Clinic. He married Marion E. Sanford on April 29, 1955. Keith graduated magna cum laude from Amherst College in 1950, and from Yale Law School in 1953. He then served in the United States Marine Corps during the Korean War.

== Career ==
After returning to his hometown of Rochester, Keith took a job as counsel with the Mayo Clinic, where he worked with future U.S. Supreme Court Justice Harry Blackmun.

In 1959, he was elected to the Minnesota State Senate as a member of the Minnesota Democratic–Farmer–Labor Party (DFL). During his tenure as a state senator, Keith served as a delegate to the 1960 Democratic National Convention. He was Lieutenant Governor of Minnesota under Governor Karl Rolvaag from 1963 until 1967. He challenged Rolvaag for the nomination to be the DFL's candidate for governor in the 1966 general election, but was defeated by Rolvaag in the primary election.

In 1989, Keith began serving as a justice of the Minnesota Supreme Court. He became chief justice in 1990 and served in that capacity until 1998.

== Death ==
Keith died at his home on October 3, 2020. He was 91 years old, just a month and a half shy of his 92nd birthday.

Political offices
Preceded by Karl Rolvaag	Lieutenant Governor of Minnesota; 1963–1967	Succeeded by James B. Goetz
Legal offices
Preceded by Peter S. Popovich	Chief Justice of the Minnesota Supreme Court; 1990–1998	Succeeded by Kathleen A. Blatz
Party political offices
Preceded by Karl Rolvaag	Democratic nominee for Lieutenant Governor of Minnesota; 1962	Succeeded by Bob Short
Preceded by Karl Rolvaag	Endorsed Gubernatorial Candidate, Minnesota DFL State Convention; 1966	Succeeded by Wendell Anderson
