= Swanville Township, Morrison County, Minnesota =

Swanville Township, Minnesota
- Township
- Location within the state of Minnesota Swanville Township, Minnesota (the United States)
- Coordinates: 45°52′50″N 94°34′43″W
- Country: United States
- State: Minnesota
- County: Morrison

Area
  - Total: 37.2 sq mi (96.3 km^{2})
  - Land: 35.3 sq mi (91.5 km^{2})
  - Water: 1.9 sq mi (4.8 km^{2})
- Elevation: 1,220 ft (372 m)

Population (2000)
  - Total: 534
  - Density: 15/sq mi (5.8/km^{2})
- Time zone: UTC-6 (Central (CST))
  - Summer (DST): UTC-5 (CDT)
- ZIP code: 56382
- Area code: 320
- FIPS code: 27-63796
- GNIS feature ID: 0665751

Swanville Township is a township in Morrison County, Minnesota, United States. The population was 534 at the 2000 census.

Swanville Township was organized in 1892, and named after Swanville, Minnesota.

== Geography ==
According to the United States Census Bureau, the township has a total area of 37.2 square miles (96.3 km^{2}), of which 35.3 square miles (91.5 km^{2}) is land and 1.9 square miles (4.8 km^{2}) (4.97%) is water.

== Demographics ==
As of the census of 2000, there were 534 people, 176 households, and 142 families residing in the township. The population density was 15.1 people per square mile (5.8/km^{2}). There were 184 housing units at an average density of 5.2/sq mi (2.0/km^{2}). The racial makeup of the township was 98.31% White and 1.69% Asian.

There were 176 households, out of which 43.2% had children under the age of 18 living with them, 70.5% were married couples living together, 6.3% had a female householder with no husband present, and 19.3% were non-families. 18.8% of all households were made up of individuals, and 11.4% had someone living alone who was 65 years of age or older. The average household size was 3.03 and the average family size was 3.48.

In the township the population was spread out, with 34.6% under the age of 18, 6.9% from 18 to 24, 24.9% from 25 to 44, 20.6% from 45 to 64, and 12.9% who were 65 years of age or older. The median age was 36 years. For every 100 females, there were 109.4 males. For every 100 females age 18 and over, there were 105.3 males.

The median income for a household in the township was $36,458, and the median income for a family was $40,481. Males had a median income of $31,875 versus $21,042 for females. The per capita income for the township was $13,955. About 10.6% of families and 14.7% of the population were below the poverty line, including 21.5% of those under age 18 and 18.8% of those age 65 or over.
