= Clifton T. Parks =

American politician (1895–1976)

Clifton T. Parks (April 8, 1895 – August 26, 1976) was an American lawyer and attorney.

Parks was born in Minnesota and lived in Saint Paul, Minnesota with his wife. He was a lawyer. Parks served in the Minnesota House of Representatives from 1953 to 1962 and in the Minnesota Senate from 1963 to 1970. Parks died from a heart ailment at Bethesda Hospital in Sant Paul, Minnesota.
