= Polk County, Nebraska =

County in Nebraska, United States

Coordinates: 41.19°N 97.57°W

Polk County
- County
- County of Polk
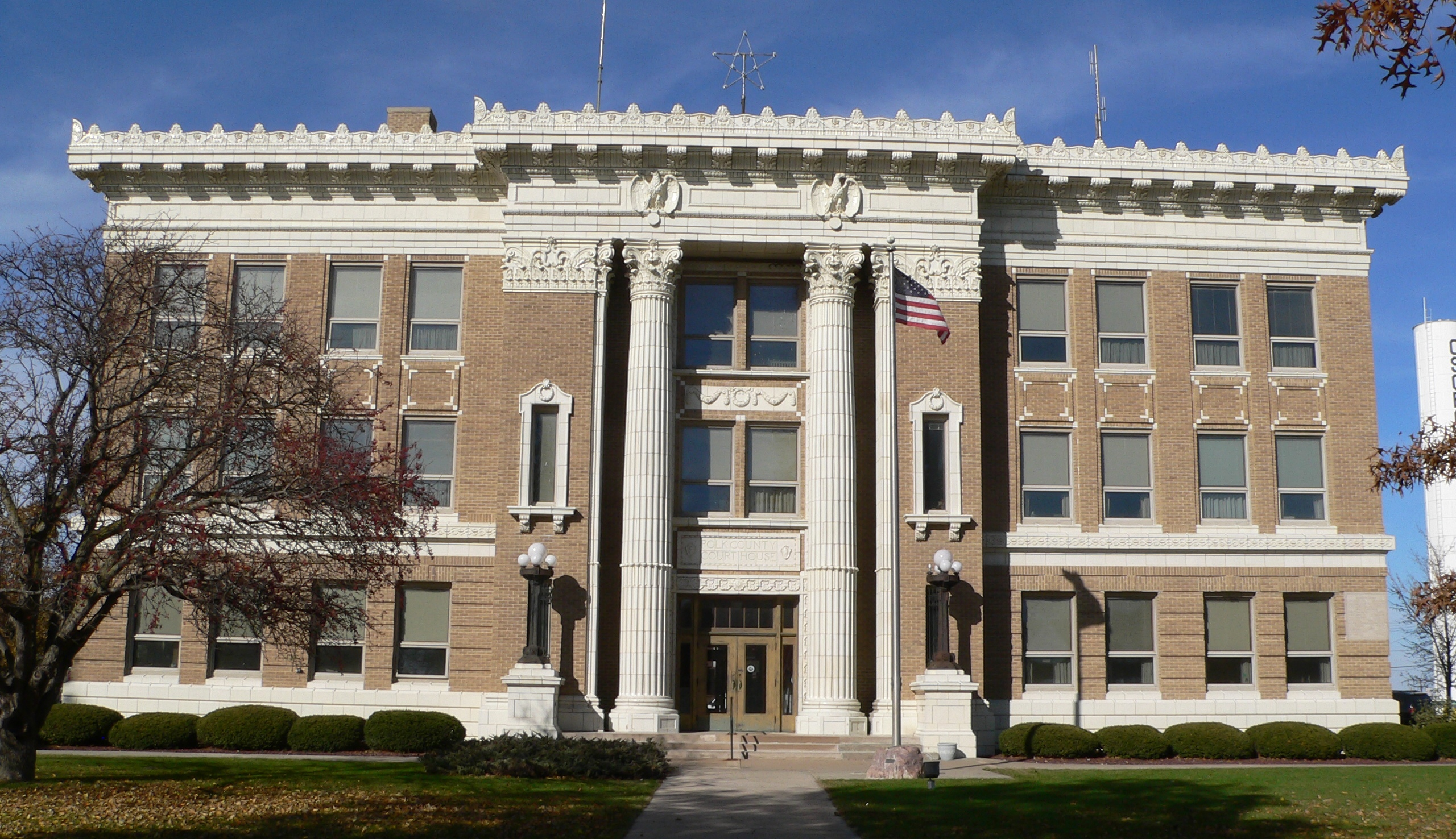
- Polk County Courthouse in Osceola
- Interactive map of Polk County
- Location within the U.S. state of Nebraska
- Country: United States
- State: Nebraska
- Established: January 26, 1856
- Organized: August 6, 1870
- Named for: James K. Polk
- County seat: Osceola
- Largest city: Stromsburg

Area
  - Total: 441 sq mi (1,140 km^{2})
  - Land: 438 sq mi (1,130 km^{2})
  - Water: 2.3 sq mi (6.0 km^{2}) 0.5%
- Highest elevation: 1,739 ft (530 m)
- Lowest elevation: 1,089 ft (332 m)

Population (2020)
  - Total: 5,214
  - Estimate (2025): 5,270 ▲
  - Density: 11.9/sq mi (4.60/km^{2})
- Time zone: UTC−6 (Central)
  - Summer (DST): UTC−5 (CDT)
- Area code: 402/531
- FIPS code: 31143
- GNIS feature ID: 835893
- Website: polkcounty.nebraska.gov

Polk County is a county in the U.S. state of Nebraska. As of the 2020 United States census, the population was 5,214. Its county seat is Osceola. The county was formed in 1856, and was organized in 1870. It was named for President James K. Polk. In the Nebraska license plate system, Polk County is represented by the prefix 41 (it had the 41st-largest number of vehicles registered in the county when the license plate system was established in 1922).

== Geography ==
The Platte River flows northeastward along the northwest boundary of Polk County. The lower portion of the county is drained by a local drainage, flowing east and east-northeastward into Butler County. The county terrain consists of rolling hills, dropping off to the river valley in the northern portion, and sloped to the east-southeast in the lower portion of the county. The county terrain is largely devoted to agriculture.

According to the U.S. Census Bureau, the county has a total area of 441 square miles (1,140 km^{2}), of which 438 square miles (1,130 km^{2}) is land and 2.3 square miles (6.0 km^{2}) (0.5%) is water.

=== Major highways ===
- U.S. Highway 81
- Nebraska Highway 39
- Nebraska Highway 66
- Nebraska Highway 69
- Nebraska Highway 92

=== Adjacent counties ===
- Butler County – east
- Seward County – southeast
- York County – south
- Hamilton County – southwest
- Merrick County – west
- Platte County – north

== Demographics ==
Historical population
Census	Pop.	Note	%±
1860	19		—
1870	136		615.8%
1880	6,846		4,933.8%
1890	10,817		58.0%
1900	10,542		−2.5%
1910	10,521		−0.2%
1920	10,714		1.8%
1930	10,092		−5.8%
1940	8,748		−13.3%
1950	8,044		−8.0%
1960	7,210		−10.4%
1970	6,468		−10.3%
1980	6,320		−2.3%
1990	5,668		−10.3%
2000	5,639		−0.5%
2010	5,406		−4.1%
2020	5,214		−3.6%
2025 (est.)	5,270	▲	1.1%
US Decennial Census; 1790-1960 1900-1990; 1990-2000 2010-2013

=== 2020 census ===
As of the 2020 census, the county had a population of 5,214. The median age was 46.1 years. 22.5% of residents were under the age of 18 and 23.8% of residents were 65 years of age or older. For every 100 females there were 101.7 males, and for every 100 females age 18 and over there were 101.5 males age 18 and over.

The racial makeup of the county was 92.0% White, 0.2% Black or African American, 0.4% American Indian and Alaska Native, 0.0% Asian, 0.0% Native Hawaiian and Pacific Islander, 2.2% from some other race, and 5.0% from two or more races. Hispanic or Latino residents of any race comprised 5.0% of the population.

0.0% of residents lived in urban areas, while 100.0% lived in rural areas.

There were 2,146 households in the county, of which 27.7% had children under the age of 18 living with them and 18.8% had a female householder with no spouse or partner present. About 27.4% of all households were made up of individuals and 13.4% had someone living alone who was 65 years of age or older.

There were 2,524 housing units, of which 15.0% were vacant. Among occupied housing units, 79.6% were owner-occupied and 20.4% were renter-occupied. The homeowner vacancy rate was 1.5% and the rental vacancy rate was 12.1%.

=== 2000 census ===
As of the 2000 United States census, there were 5,639 people, 2,259 households, and 1,570 families in the county. The population density was 5 people/km^{2} (13 people/mi^{2}). There were 2,717 housing units at an average density of 2 units/km^{2} (5.2 units/mi^{2}). The racial makeup of the county was 98.92% White, 0.02% Black or African American, 0.28% Native American, 0.09% Asian, 0.28% from other races, and 0.41% from two or more races. 1.08% of the population were Hispanic or Latino of any race.

There were 2,259 households, out of which 29.90% had children under the age of 18 living with them, 62.90% were married couples living together, 4.10% had a female householder with no husband present, and 30.50% were non-families. 27.60% of all households were made up of individuals, and 15.40% had someone living alone who was 65 years of age or older. The average household size was 2.43 and the average family size was 2.97.

The county population contained 25.10% under the age of 18, 6.00% from 18 to 24, 24.40% from 25 to 44, 23.10% from 45 to 64, and 21.40% who were 65 years of age or older. The median age was 42 years. For every 100 females there were 100.50 males. For every 100 females age 18 and over, there were 95.70 males.

The median income for a household in the county was $37,819, and the median income for a family was $45,081. Males had a median income of $30,286 versus $19,595 for females. The per capita income for the county was $17,934. About 4.40% of families and 5.80% of the population were below the poverty line, including 7.20% of those under age 18 and 4.70% of those age 65 or over.

== Communities ==
=== Cities ===
- Osceola (county seat)
- Stromsburg

=== Villages ===
- Polk
- Shelby

=== Unincorporated communities ===
- Durant
- Swedehome or Swede Home

=== Townships ===
- Canada
- Clear Creek
- Hackberry
- Island
- Osceola
- Platte
- Pleasant Home
- Stromsburg
- Valley

== Politics ==
Polk County voters have been reliably Republican for several decades. In only one national election since 1936 has the county selected the Democratic Party candidate (as of 2024).

United States presidential election results for Polk County, Nebraska
Year	Republican		Democratic		Third party(ies)	
Year	No.	%	No.	%	No.	%
1900	1,023	41.25%	1,376	55.48%	81	3.27%
1904	1,235	51.91%	239	10.05%	905	38.04%
1908	1,171	44.31%	1,264	47.82%	208	7.87%
1912	485	19.43%	996	39.90%	1,015	40.67%
1916	1,060	38.29%	1,600	57.80%	108	3.90%
1920	2,393	63.80%	1,236	32.95%	122	3.25%
1924	2,354	56.49%	1,229	29.49%	584	14.01%
1928	3,096	67.17%	1,494	32.41%	19	0.41%
1932	1,636	35.35%	2,939	63.50%	53	1.15%
1936	2,256	46.78%	2,519	52.23%	48	1.00%
1940	2,653	61.87%	1,635	38.13%	0	0.00%
1944	2,357	60.84%	1,517	39.16%	0	0.00%
1948	2,026	59.21%	1,396	40.79%	0	0.00%
1952	3,008	76.66%	916	23.34%	0	0.00%
1956	2,482	68.62%	1,135	31.38%	0	0.00%
1960	2,397	66.94%	1,184	33.06%	0	0.00%
1964	1,607	48.16%	1,730	51.84%	0	0.00%
1968	1,795	66.83%	690	25.69%	201	7.48%
1972	2,050	71.25%	827	28.75%	0	0.00%
1976	1,797	58.86%	1,190	38.98%	66	2.16%
1980	2,206	75.14%	538	18.32%	192	6.54%
1984	2,149	77.41%	610	21.97%	17	0.61%
1988	1,769	64.94%	944	34.65%	11	0.40%
1992	1,437	49.25%	661	22.65%	820	28.10%
1996	1,504	58.84%	750	29.34%	302	11.82%
2000	1,925	73.67%	610	23.34%	78	2.99%
2004	2,146	78.69%	549	20.13%	32	1.17%
2008	1,822	71.65%	668	26.27%	53	2.08%
2012	1,890	76.92%	528	21.49%	39	1.59%
2016	2,028	78.54%	413	16.00%	141	5.46%
2020	2,291	79.36%	530	18.36%	66	2.29%
2024	2,296	81.16%	501	17.71%	32	1.13%

== See also ==
- National Register of Historic Places listings in Polk County, Nebraska
