= Harold LeVander =

American politician

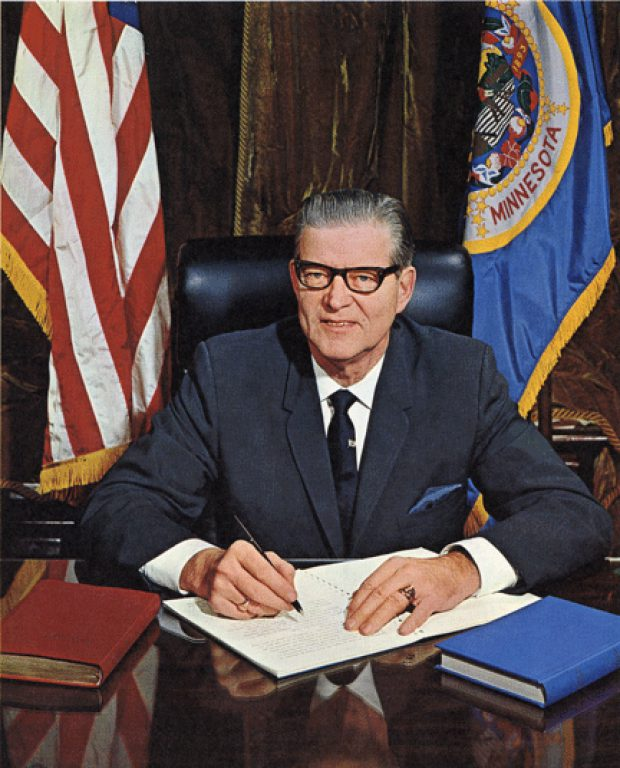
- LeVander as Governor, 1967

32nd Governor of Minnesota
- In office January 2, 1967 – January 4, 1971
- Lieutenant: James B. Goetz
- Preceded by: Karl Rolvaag
- Succeeded by: Wendell Anderson

Personal details
- Born: Karl Harold Phillip LeVander; October 10, 1910 Polk County, Nebraska, US
- Died: March 30, 1992 (aged 81) Saint Paul, Minnesota, US
- Party: Republican
- Spouse: Iantha Powrie
- Children: 3
- Education: Gustavus Adolphus College; University of Minnesota Law School
- Profession: lawyer

Karl Harold Phillip LeVander (October 10, 1910 – March 30, 1992) was an American attorney and politician. A Republican, he served as the 32nd governor of Minnesota from January 2, 1967 to January 4, 1971, after defeating incumbent governor Karl Rolvaag in the 1966 election.

== Background ==
LeVander was born in Swedehome, Nebraska (near Stromsburg, Polk County) and attended high school in Watertown, Minnesota. His father, Peter Magni LeVander, was a Swedish immigrant and clergyman.

He graduated magna cum laude from Gustavus Adolphus College in 1932, where he served as class president and student council president. He was also on the debate team, winning the National Peace Oratorical Contest, and the football team and track team, where he competed in the high hurdles and pole vault. After graduating from Gustavus, he attended the University of Minnesota Law School. He married Iantha Powrie in 1938, and they raised a family of three children: Harold "Hap," Jean, and Diane LeVander.

== Career ==
After graduation, LeVander worked as assistant county attorney for Dakota County from 1935 to 1939. He also worked for the law firm of Stassen & Ryan in South St. Paul, and taught speech and coached debate at Macalester College. He was active in local commerce, acting as president of South Saint Paul's Chamber of Commerce from 1952 to 1954 and of the South Saint Paul United Federal Savings and Loan Association from 1953 to 1967. He was politically connected, having worked with future governor Harold Stassen and future U.S. Representative Elmer Ryan at their law firm. In 1962, he earned the Greater Gustavus Alumni Award for Distinguished Career in Law. LeVander was elected governor of Minnesota in 1966, defeating incumbent DFLer Karl Rolvaag.

=== As governor ===
LeVander took office in 1967, with the support of both houses of the state legislature. In his inauguration address, he pledged to focus on urban renewal, support the ongoing civil rights movement, raise pay for teachers and all state employees, and increase funding for improvements to highways and hospitals. During his term the first Minnesota sales tax was created, but it exempted basic needs, defined as food, clothing, and medicine.

LeVander created the Metropolitan Council, the Minnesota Pollution Control Agency, and the Human Rights Department. During his term, the legislature ratified the Twenty-sixth Amendment to the United States Constitution, which lowered the minimum voting age nationwide to 18.

=== Later life ===
In a surprise move, LeVander declined to seek reelection in 1970, returning to his law practice and business interests. He became a director of The St. Paul Companies (1973–1981), the Billy Graham Evangelistic Association (1974–1981), and the Saint Paul Chamber of Commerce (1975–1978). He died of Parkinson's disease in 1992, aged 81.

Party political offices
Preceded by Elmer L. Andersen	Republican nominee for Governor of Minnesota; 1966	Succeeded by Douglas M. Head
Political offices
Preceded by Karl Rolvaag	32nd Governor of Minnesota; 1967 – 1971	Succeeded by Wendell Anderson
