= Luther Replogle =

American businessman, diplomat and philanthropist

Luther Irvin "Rep" Replogle (March 2, 1902 Tyrone, Pennsylvania − July 3, 1981 Chicago, Illinois) was a businessman, diplomat, and philanthropist, and the founder of Replogle Globes.

When he was five, his family moved to Altoona, Pennsylvania. He attended the U.S. Naval Academy at Annapolis for 2½ years, starting in 1920.

About a decade later, he founded Replogle Globes in 1930, which became the largest globe manufacturing business in the world in the mid-20th century. After selling the company in 1959, Replogle continued as its President and Chief Operating Officer. Ten years after that, he was the U.S. Ambassador to Iceland from 1969 to 1972 and died in Chicago in 1981.
