= Karl Rolvaag =

American politician

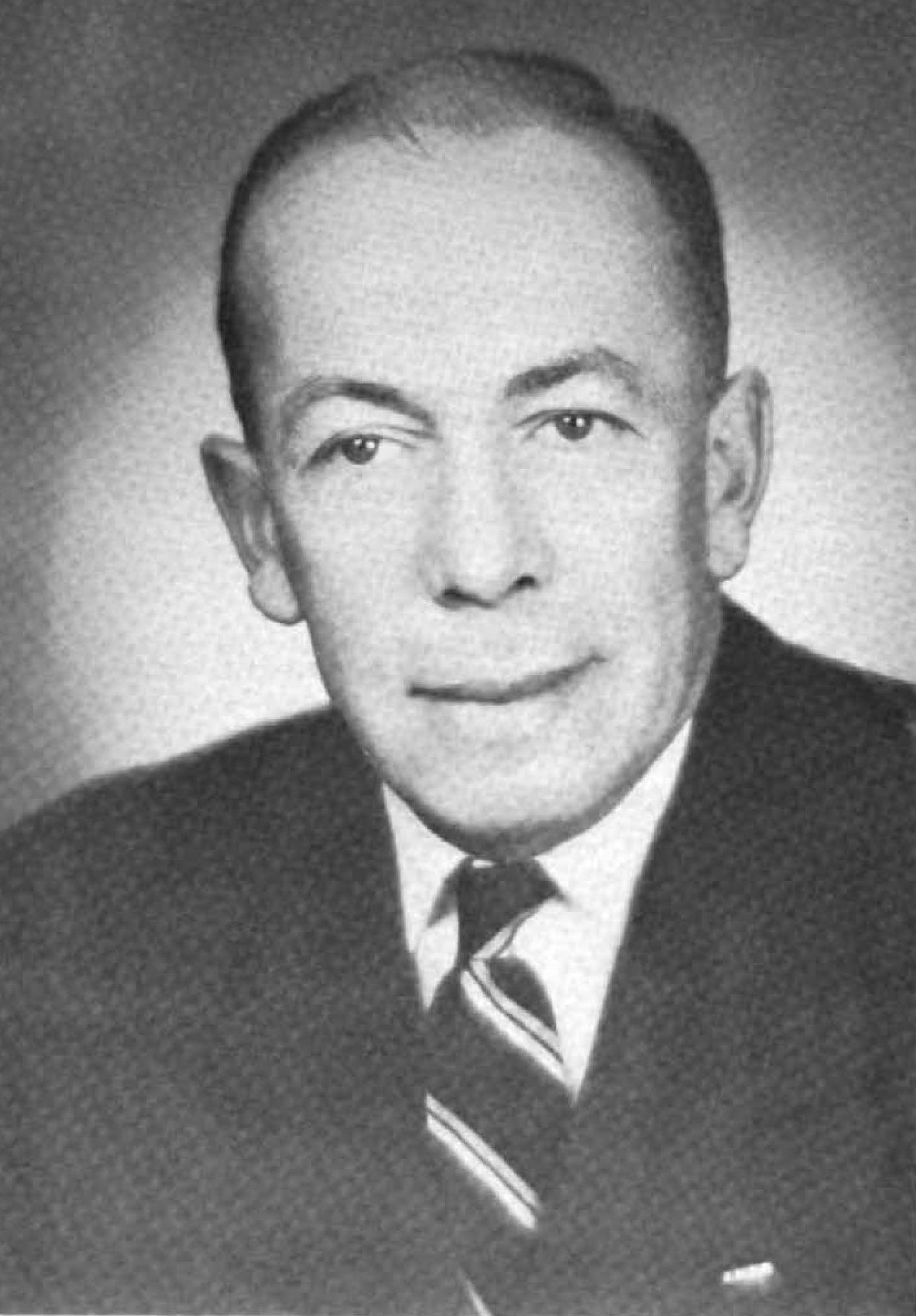
- Rolvaag in 1961

United States Ambassador to Iceland
- In office May 9, 1967 – March 27, 1969
- President: Lyndon Johnson; Richard Nixon
- Preceded by: James K. Penfield
- Succeeded by: Luther I. Replogle

31st Governor of Minnesota
- In office March 25, 1963 – January 2, 1967
- Lieutenant: Alexander M. Keith
- Preceded by: Elmer L. Andersen
- Succeeded by: Harold LeVander

36th Lieutenant Governor of Minnesota
- In office January 3, 1955 – January 8, 1963
- Governor: Orville L. Freeman; Elmer L. Andersen
- Preceded by: Donald O. Wright
- Succeeded by: Alexander M. Keith

Personal details
- Born: Karl Fritjof Rolvaag; July 18, 1913 Northfield, Minnesota, U.S.
- Died: December 20, 1990 (aged 77) Northfield, Minnesota, U.S.
- Party: Democratic
- Spouse(s): Florence Amelia Boedeker (divorced) Marian Rankin MacKenzie (m. 1982)
- Children: 2
- Education: St. Olaf College
- Profession: Politician, soldier
- Awards: Silver Star; Purple Heart; Croix de Guerre (x2)

Military service
- Allegiance: United States of America
- Battles/wars: World War II

Karl Fritjof Rolvaag (July 18, 1913 – December 20, 1990) was an American diplomat and politician who served from March 25, 1963, to January 2, 1967, as the 31st governor of Minnesota. A member of the Democratic-Farmer-Labor (DFL) Party, he was the son of the author and professor Ole E. Rølvaag.

The 1962 election was held on November 6, but the results were not known until a 139-day recount was completed in March 1963. Rolvaag won the closest gubernatorial election in state history, defeating the incumbent, Elmer L. Andersen by 91 votes out of over 1.3 million cast. He is one of only five Minnesota Democrats to win a gubernatorial election with a Democrat in the White House.

== Background ==
A native of Northfield, Minnesota, Rolvaag lived in his hometown and graduated from. After his father's death in 1931, he traveled throughout the west, shifting between locations and professions. He considered joining the Communist Party, and joined the IWW. He returned to Northfield to attend St. Olaf College, and graduated in 1941. While attending the college, he co-founded "Patriots for Peace", an antiwar student organization. He then fought in World War II, rising to the rank of lieutenant and commanding a tank. While serving, he earned a Silver Star, a Purple Heart, and two Croix de Guerre.

After the war, Rolvaag went to Norway to learn about politics before returning to Minnesota. He ran for the United States House of Representatives in 1946, 1948, and 1952. From 1950 to 1954, Rolvaag served as chairman of the DFL. In 1954, he was elected lieutenant governor, and Ray Hemenway became DFL chairman. In 1962, Rolvaag was elected governor. The election was famously close, decided by only 91 votes.

== Governorship ==
Rolvaag was a moderate. He was the first Minnesota governor to serve a four-year term, during which the state legislature was dominated by conservatives, and he vetoed more legislation than any of his predecessors.

Rolvaag is remembered for a leadership role in bringing reform to the state's institutions for the mentally disabled, leading to improved conditions and treatment for people with developmental disabilities. He also changed the organization of the state's junior colleges. Formerly, the local school board ran each college separately; Rolvaag designed a coordinated statewide system with the goal of putting every Minnesotan within commuting distance of an institution of higher education. He also bitterly opposed the state colleges' expansion plans and opposed designating a second state research university. Fort Snelling was restored into a museum during his term.

In 1964, after Hubert Humphrey was elected Vice President of the United States, Rolvaag appointed Walter Mondale to Humphrey's seat in the United States Senate.

In May 1965, HF bill 1400, a law to prevent Minnesota counties from restricting the sale of alcohol, came to Rolvaag's desk. Instead of passing or vetoing the bill, he let it sit on his desk until it automatically became state law after three days.

When Rolvaag ran for reelection in 1966, his party did not endorse him, opting instead for Lieutenant Governor Sandy Keith. Rolvaag entered the DFL primary with a cry of "Let the people decide!" and roundly defeated Keith. He lost to Republican nominee Harold LeVander in the general election.

== Later life ==
In 1967, after leaving office, Rolvaag was appointed United States Ambassador to Iceland by President Lyndon Johnson. He returned to Minnesota in 1970 and was elected to the Minnesota Public Utilities Commission. He resigned that post in 1975 in order to seek treatment for alcoholism. His alcohol addiction eventually led to the end of his 37-year marriage, but he overcame it in the 1980s. Rolvaag stayed out of politics for the rest of his life, but helped others work through their problems with alcoholism, attending meetings and giving talks in places as nearby as Northfield and as far off as Sweden. In 1982, he married Marian Rankin Mackenzie, a friend from high school with whom he had reunited at their class's 50-year reunion. He had two children from his first marriage.

Rolvaag died at his home in Northfield on December 20, 1990, aged 77.

== Sources ==
- Minnesota Historical Society,
- "Ex-Gov. Karl Rolvaag, Minnesotan, 78, Dies". The New York Times. December 21, 1990.

=== Papers ===
Correspondence, political files, subject files, personal files, news clippings, print materials, and sound and visual materials of Karl F. Rolvaag are available for research use at the Minnesota Historical Society.

Political offices
Preceded by Donald O. Wright	Lieutenant Governor of Minnesota; 1955–1963	Succeeded by Alexander M. Keith
Preceded by Elmer L. Andersen	Governor of Minnesota; 1963–1967	Succeeded by Harold LeVander
Party political offices
Preceded by Arthur Hansen	Democratic nominee for Lieutenant Governor of Minnesota; 1954, 1956, 1958, 1960	Succeeded by Alexander Keith
Preceded by Orville Freeman	Endorsed Gubernatorial Candidate, Minnesota DFL State Convention; 1962	Succeeded by Alexander Keith
Preceded by Orville Freeman	DFL nominee for Governor of Minnesota; 1962, 1966	Succeeded by Wendell Anderson
Preceded by Orville Freeman	Democratic-Farmer-Labor Party Chairman; 1950-1954	Succeeded by Ray Hemenway
Diplomatic posts
Preceded by James K. Penfield	U.S. Ambassador to Iceland; 1967–1969	Succeeded by Luther I. Replogle
