= List of metropolitan planning organizations in the United States =

The United States government established planning organizations to provide for the coordination of land use, transportation and infrastructure. These Metropolitan Planning Organizations (MPO) may exist as a separate, independent organization or they may be administered by a city, county, regional planning organization, highway commission or other government organization. Each MPO has its own structure and governance. The following is a list of the current federally designated MPOs.

== List of metropolitan planning organizations ==
List of MPOs
MPO ID	Name	City	State	Designation year	Website	MPO 2010 population	2010 group quarter population	2010 total housing units	2010 occupied housing units	2010 vacant housing units	MPO UZA population
15201300	Maui MPO	Wailuku	HI	2013	website	142,829	2,753	64,489	49,698	14,791	55,222
15197500	Oahu MPO	Honolulu	HI	1975	website	952,502	35,254	336,504	310,805	25,699	916,013
02196800	Anchorage Metropolitan Area Transportation Solutions	Anchorage	AK	1968	website	289,011	8,446	111,064	106,039	5,025	251,243
02200300	Fairbanks Area Surface Transportation (FAST) Planning	Fairbanks	AK	2003	website	72,565	3,868	29,442	26,543	2,899	64,513
06197201	San Diego Association of Governments	San Diego	CA	1972	website	3,095,271	101,966	1,164,768	1,086,848	77,920	2,964,804
04198300	Yuma MPO	Yuma	AZ	1983	website	195,807	5,938	87,878	64,785	23,093	134,256
04197301	Maricopa Association of Governments	Phoenix	AZ	1973	website	4,055,281	71,402	1,738,891	1,489,165	249,726	3,826,155
04197302	Pima Association of Governments	Tucson	AZ	1973	website	980,263	24,139	440,909	388,660	52,249	834,443
04201303	Sun Corridor Metropolitan Planning Organization	Casa Grande	AZ	2013	website	108,061	8,009	44,586	35,481	9,105	51,331
04201302	Sierra Vista Metropolitan Planning Organization	Sierra Vista	AZ	2013	website	56,070	3,066	24,111	21,992	2,119	52,745
35198201	Mesilla Valley MPO	Las Cruces	NM	1982	website	157,448	4,281	64,792	60,109	4,683	128,759
48197302	El Paso MPO	El Paso	TX-NM	1973	website	853,190	16,882	286,403	271,582	14,821	802,927
48200500	Permian Basin MPO	Midland	TX	1965	website	267,927	3,818	105,228	97,537	7,691	244,212
48197600	Lubbock MPO	Lubbock	TX	2013	website	250,960	10,879	103,659	95,637	8,022	237,356
06197001	Metropolitan Transportation Commission	San Francisco	CA	1970	website	7,150,828	147,664	2,785,949	2,608,043	177,906	6,866,861
	Council of San Benito County Governments	Hollister	CA	1973	website						
06198100	Shasta Regional Transportation Agency	Redding	CA	1981	website	177,223	2,654	77,313	70,346	6,967	117,731
06199200	San Luis Obispo COG	San Luis Obispo	CA	1992	website	269,637	17,006	117,315	102,016	15,299	176,368
06196600	Santa Barbara County Association of Governments	Santa Barbara	CA	1966	website	423,891	17,782	152,831	142,101	10,730	377,634
06197502	Association of Monterey Bay Area Governments	Marina	CA	1975	website	732,667	29,960	261,343	237,090	24,253	536,855
06198600	Merced County Association of Governments	Merced	CA	1986	website	255,366	4,896	83,541	75,505	8,036	161,757
06197203	Stanislaus COG	Modesto	CA	1972	website	514,453	6,305	179,503	165,180	14,323	433,288
06200301	Kings County Association of Governments	Lemoore	CA	2003	website	152,982	21,580	43,867	41,233	2,634	87,941
06197202	Fresno Council of Governments	Fresno	CA	1972	website	930,885	17,523	315,691	289,531	26,160	654,628
06200302	Madera County Transportation Commission	Madera	CA	2003	website	150,865	8,624	49,140	43,317	5,823	78,413
06197002	Kern COG	Bakersfield	CA	1970	website	839,614	36,757	284,357	254,602	29,755	578,366
06198200	Tulare County Association of Governments	Visalia	CA	1982	website	442,171	4,772	141,693	130,349	11,344	289,726
06196800	San Joaquin COG	Stockton	CA	1968	website	685,306	14,354	233,754	215,007	18,747	610,468
06196700	Sacramento Area COG	Sacramento	CA	1967	website	2,274,557	37,635	897,164	825,959	71,205	1,968,660
06198000	Butte County Association of Governments	Chico	CA	1980	website	220,000	4,942	95,835	87,618	8,217	98,176
32199800	Tahoe Regional Planning Agency	Stateline	NV	1998	website	55,489	686	48,546	23,800	24,746	0
32200300	Carson Area Metropolitan Planning Organization	Carson City	NV	2003	website	82,806	3,630	35,043	31,975	3,068	58,079
32197900	Regional Transportation Commission of Washoe County	Reno	NV	1979	website	412,326	5,125	176,888	159,522	17,366	392,132
41201302	Middle Rogue MPO	Central Point	OR	2013	website	56,501	1,145	25,948	23,810	2,138	50,520
41198200	Rogue Valley MPO	Central Point	OR	1982	website	167,859	3,440	74,135	68,073	6,062	154,081
41200300	Corvallis Area MPO	Corvallis	OR	2003	website	64,951	4,961	27,707	26,330	1,377	62,089
41197300	Central Lane MPO	Coburg	OR	1973	website	249,601	7,953	109,031	103,853	5,178	246,980
41201301	Albany Area Metropolitan Planning Organization	Albany	OR	2013	website	57,721	835	23,832	22,407	1,425	56,997
41198700	Salem-Keizer Area Transportation Study	Salem	OR	1987	website	241,598	9,293	94,511	88,767	5,744	234,729
41197900	Portland Area Metropolitan Service District	Portland	OR	1979	website	1,499,844	28,487	636,913	599,208	37,705	1,486,105
53199200	Southwest Washington Regional Transportation Council	Vancouver	WA	1992	website	425,363	3,210	167,413	158,099	9,314	359,562
53198202	Cowlitz-Wahkiakum Council of Governments	Kelso	WA	1982	website	65,796	1,076	28,479	26,550	1,929	63,380
53198201	Thurston Regional Planning Council	Olympia	WA	1982	website	173,829	3,430	75,933	71,030	4,903	171,663
53199100	Puget Sound Regional Council	Seattle	WA	1991	website	3,690,866	74,195	1,570,616	1,454,655	115,961	3,403,492
53196600	Whatcom COG	Bellingham	WA	1966	website	113,063	5,225	49,880	46,992	2,888	110,354
53200301	Skagit MPO	Mt. Vernon	WA	2003	website	116,901	1,624	51,473	45,557	5,916	62,966
41200200	Bend MPO	Bend	OR	2002	website	84,249	803	39,094	34,573	4,521	83,162
53201300	Walla Walla Valley MPO	Walla Walla	WA	2013	website	56,239	4,525	22,440	20,790	1,650	55,805
53197402	Yakima Valley MPO	Yakima	WA	1974	website	129,829	2,695	49,527	47,230	2,297	124,111
53200302	Chelan-Douglas Transportation Council	Wenatchee	WA	2003	website	66,591	737	26,500	24,975	1,525	65,649
53197100	Benton-Franklin Council of Governments	Richland	WA	1971	website	214,704	1,770	80,124	76,433	3,691	209,615
06197501	Southern California Association of Governments	Los Angeles	CA	1975	website	18,051,203	308,058	6,331,792	5,847,760	484,032	17,425,875
04201301	Lake Havasu Metropolitan Planning Organization	Lake Havasu City	AZ	2013	website	55,280	219	34,479	24,487	9,992	53,427
32198300	Regional Transportation Commission of Southern Nevada	Las Vegas	NV	1983	website	1,951,300	21,992	840,364	715,383	124,981	1,886,011
49200200	Dixie MPO	St. George	UT	2002	website	105,336	1,065	44,697	36,062	8,635	98,370
04200300	Central Yavapai MPO	Prescott Valley	AZ	2003	website	119,611	2,255	59,619	50,964	8,655	84,744
04199600	MetroPlan	Flagstaff	AZ	1996	website	83,912	8,118	34,984	29,506	5,478	71,957
49197400	Mountainland Association of Governments	Orem	UT	1974	website	514,972	13,875	147,303	140,139	7,164	483,697
49197300	Wasatch Front Regional Council	Salt Lake City	UT	1973	website	1,561,348	19,790	543,199	512,882	30,317	1,541,844
49199200	Cache MPO	Logan	UT	1992	website	98,960	3,572	32,250	30,657	1,593	94,983
16197700	Community Planning Association of Southwest Idaho	Meridian	ID	1977	website	550,359	13,010	217,429	201,497	15,932	500,960
16200302	Lewis-Clark Valley MPO	Asotin	WA	2003	website	52,535	1,140	23,336	22,124	1,212	51,880
53197401	Spokane Regional Transportation Council	Spokane	WA	1974	website	471,221	14,692	201,434	187,167	14,267	387,847
16200301	Kootenai MPO	Coeur 'd'Alene	ID	2003	website	138,494	1,488	63,177	54,200	8,977	98,378
30198200	Missoula Metropolitan Planning Organization	Missoula	MT	1982	website	93,262	3,602	41,544	39,467	2,077	81,872
16198200	Bannock Transportation Planning Organization	Pocatello	ID	1982	website	73,190	1,783	29,156	27,242	1,914	69,809
16199200	Bonneville MPO	Idaho Falls	ID	1992	website	98,672	1,167	37,327	34,774	2,553	89,452
30197100	Great Falls Planning and Community Development Department	Great Falls	MT	1971	website	68,620	2,181	30,790	28,753	2,037	65,207
35200300	Farmington MPO	Farmington	NM	2003	website	96,917	1,664	36,933	34,192	2,741	53,049
35197200	Mid-Region COG	Albuquerque	NM	1972	website	861,349	14,196	361,836	337,819	24,017	805,076
35198202	Santa Fe MPO	Santa Fe	NM	1982	website	116,386	2,599	58,334	50,612	7,722	89,284
08198200	Grand Valley Metropolitan Planning Organization	Grand Junction	CO	1982	website	130,445	3,376	55,352	51,853	3,499	127,731
08197701	Denver Regional COG	Denver	CO	1977	website	2,827,082	42,255	1,189,272	1,116,469	72,803	2,644,362
08198800	North Front Range MPO	Fort Collins	CO	1988	website	433,178	13,088	175,905	166,068	9,837	382,225
48197502	Amarillo MPO	Amarillo	TX	1975	website	216,490	7,610	88,374	81,399	6,975	196,651
08197703	Pueblo Area COG MPO and TPR	Pueblo	CO	1977	website	147,711	4,235	63,828	58,459	5,369	136,550
08197702	Pikes Peak Area COG	Colorado Springs	CO	1977	website	616,998	18,955	251,163	234,600	16,563	558,938
56198101	Cheyenne MPO	Cheyenne	WY	1981	website	80,776	1,596	35,775	33,452	2,323	73,588
30196400	Yellowstone County Planning Board	Billings	MT	1964	website	126,372	3,478	55,068	52,343	2,725	114,245
56198102	Casper Area MPO	Casper	WY	1981	website	71,077	1,645	31,170	28,880	2,290	64,548
46198100	Rapid City Area MPO	Rapid City	SD	1981	website	106,024	3,068	45,190	42,531	2,659	81,251
38198201	Bismarck-Mandan MPO	Bismarck	ND	1982	website	100,165	3,204	43,640	41,695	1,945	81,955
48197304	Laredo & Webb County Area MPO	Laredo	TX	1973	website	243,978	3,479	70,997	65,437	5,560	235,730
48199302	Harlingen-San Benito MPO	Harlingen	TX	1964	website	156,063	1,164	56,489	48,381	8,108	132,426
48199301	Hidalgo County MPO	Springvale	TX	1982	website	774,014	6,982	248,081	216,276	31,805	728,825
48197305	Brownsville MPO	Brownsville	TX	1964	website	226,282	1,749	69,130	63,323	5,807	219,618
48197303	Corpus Christi MPO	Corpus Christi	TX	2003	website	328,116	5,753	134,470	120,928	13,542	320,069
48198200	Victoria MPO	Victoria	TX	1982	website	86,793	1,508	35,417	32,187	3,230	63,683
48196400	San Angelo MPO	San Angelo	TX	1964	website	96,897	4,858	41,060	37,530	3,530	92,984
48196900	Abilene MPO	Abilene	TX	1965	website	126,592	9,997	51,396	46,940	4,456	110,421
48197700	Alamo Area MPO	San Antonio	TX	2003	website	1,976,167	45,368	768,813	704,148	64,665	1,761,424
48197301	Capital Area MPO	Austin	TX	1973	website	1,759,122	41,932	727,381	666,993	60,388	1,412,028
48197501	Killeen-Temple Metropolitan Planning Organization	Belton	TX	1973	website	365,892	11,181	145,074	131,937	13,137	308,020
48197403	Waco MPO	Waco	TX	1974	website	234,906	9,085	95,124	86,892	8,232	172,378
48197401	North Central Texas COG	Arlington	TX	1974	website	6,417,630	78,210	2,524,534	2,317,174	207,360	5,658,096
48197002	Bryan-College Station MPO	Bryan	TX	1970	website	194,851	13,512	77,700	71,739	5,961	171,345
48197402	Houston-Galveston Area Council	Houston	TX	1974	website	5,892,002	77,616	2,282,095	2,051,694	230,401	5,365,483
48197404	Tyler Area MPO	Tyler	TX	2014	website	199,597	4,093	83,054	75,344	7,710	130,247
48197504	Longview MPO	Longview	TX	2014	website	117,298	4,068	47,585	44,216	3,369	98,884
48197001	South East Texas Regional Planning Commission	Williamsport	TX	1968	website	388,746	16,998	162,335	144,935	17,400	301,072
22198400	Imperial Calcasieu Regional Planning & Development Commission	Lake Charles	LA	1984	website	173,604	3,685	73,792	66,699	7,093	143,440
22197500	Alexandria-Pineville MPO	Alexandria	LA	1975	website	131,613	4,501	55,684	50,401	5,283	79,590
48197505	Texarkana MPO	Texarkana	TX-AR	1975	website	94,278	4,798	40,441	36,613	3,828	78,162
22196800	Northwest Louisiana COG	Shreveport	LA	1968	website	371,948	8,208	161,379	147,354	14,025	298,317
22197202	Lafayette Area MPO	Lafayette	LA	1972	website	338,379	6,770	140,749	130,028	10,721	252,720
22198200	Houma-Thibodaux MPO	Houma	LA	1982	website	125,380	2,710	49,156	45,725	3,431	114,179
22197201	Capital Regional Planning Commission	Baton Rouge	LA	1972	website	661,042	16,035	270,563	249,578	20,985	583,310
22201300	South Tangipahoa MPO	New Orleans	LA	2013	website	99,316	3,759	40,878	37,011	3,867	67,629
22197300	Ouachata Council of Governments	Monroe	LA	1973	website	126,619	5,523	53,609	48,767	4,842	116,331
22196200	Regional Planning Commission	New Orleans	LA	1962	website	1,057,709	18,066	492,304	415,761	76,543	1,027,479
28198200	Hattiesburg-Petal-Forrest-Lamar MPO	Hattiesburg	MS	1982	website	97,272	3,657	42,522	37,899	4,623	80,337
28197300	Gulf Regional Planning Commission	Gulfport	MS	1973	website	308,313	7,176	142,558	118,963	23,595	259,118
01196401	Mobile Area Transportation Study	Mobile	AL	1964	website	383,694	6,585	165,116	147,849	17,267	326,183
28197500	Central Mississippi Planning & Development District	Jackson	MS	1975	website	461,430	15,208	189,787	172,378	17,409	351,478
01201300	Eastern Shore MPO	Fairhope	AL	2013	website	92,749	988	41,497	36,620	4,877	57,381
12197000	Florida-Alabama Transportation Planning Organization	Pensacola	FL	1970	website	434,625	20,209	206,805	169,175	37,630	396,006
12198001	Okaloosa-Walton Transportation Planning Organization	Pensacola	FL	1980	website	214,967	6,945	127,544	86,324	41,220	136,485
01197401	Tuscaloosa Area MPO	Northport	AL	1974	website	194,656	10,423	84,872	76,141	8,731	139,114
01197501	Montgomery MPO	Montgomery	AL	1975	website	328,667	14,863	139,549	124,840	14,709	263,907
01197700	Birmingham MPO	Birmingham	AL	1977	website	853,551	18,348	381,522	337,640	43,882	740,240
12198002	Bay County Transportation Planning Organization	Pensacola	FL	1980	website	168,852	3,817	99,650	68,438	31,212	142,773
01198300	Southeast Wiregrass Area MPO	Dothan	AL	1983	website	94,396	1,400	41,788	38,107	3,681	68,607
12197706	Capital Region Transportation Planning Agency	Tallahassee	FL	1977	website	367,384	21,922	163,051	144,021	19,030	240,223
01197502	Auburn – Opelika MPO	Opelika	AL	1975	website	87,629	4,399	40,337	36,027	4,310	74,692
13196401	Columbus-Phenix City Metropolitan Planning Organization	Columbus	GA	1964	website	260,695	7,574	113,699	101,748	11,951	244,431
13196500	Dougherty Area Regional Transportation Study	Albany	GA	1965	website	120,435	5,096	50,145	45,366	4,779	95,779
12197600	Lee County MPO	Fort Myers	FL	1976	website	616,576	8,430	369,240	258,652	110,588	578,739
12199201	Charlotte County – Punta Gorda MPO	Port Charlotte	FL	1992	website	161,230	3,012	101,509	74,053	27,456	145,740
12197803	Forward Pinellas - Pinellas County MPO	Clearwater	FL	1978	website	915,810	19,678	503,256	415,562	87,694	913,207
12197704	Hillsborough Transportation Planning Organization	Tampa	FL	1977	website	1,228,761	22,065	535,859	473,822	62,037	1,185,575
12198201	Pasco County MPO	New Port Richey	FL	1982	website	465,394	5,674	229,323	189,898	39,425	421,293
12197804	Sarasota-Manatee MPO	Sarasota	FL	1978	website	700,837	10,439	399,723	310,697	89,026	665,750
12199202	Hernando/Citrus MPO	Brooksville	FL	1992	website	313,992	4,079	162,516	135,039	27,477	215,596
12200300	Lake-Sumter MPO	Leesburg	FL	2003	website	390,298	12,939	197,900	162,542	35,358	282,456
12198100	Ocala – Marion County Transportation Planning Organization	Ocala	FL	1981	website	331,558	8,244	164,233	137,857	26,376	202,718
12198202	Collier MPO	Naples	FL	1982	website	321,518	4,546	197,287	133,178	64,109	259,497
12201400	Heartland Regional Transportation Planning Organization	Sebring	FL	2014	website	252,109	13,618	118,522	92,050	26,472	61,625
12197701	Miami-Dade Transportation Planning Organization	Miami	FL	1977	website	2,569,420	42,065	1,042,151	899,947	142,204	2,486,264
12197702	Broward MPO	Fort Lauderdale	FL	1977	website	1,748,066	16,892	810,388	686,047	124,341	1,747,770
12197801	Palm Beach MPO	West Palm Beach	FL	1978	website	1,320,134	19,972	664,594	544,227	120,367	1,263,360
12199301	Martin County MPO	Stuart	FL	1993	website	146,846	3,933	78,357	64,112	14,245	127,940
12197805	Polk County Transportation Planning Organization	Bartow	FL	1978	website	602,278	12,271	281,226	227,512	53,714	463,465
12197703	METROPLAN Orlando	Orlando	FL	1977	website	1,837,385	40,481	797,335	677,167	120,168	1,742,176
12198300	Space Coast Transportation Planning Organization	Viera	FL	1983	website	541,274	7,735	268,366	228,515	39,851	513,623
12197705	River to Sea Transportation Planning Organization MPA	Daytona Beach	FL	1977	website	581,923	13,274	298,883	244,037	54,846	531,233
12198203	St. Lucie Transportation Planning Organization	Port St. Lucie	FL	1982	website	277,097	3,053	136,723	108,241	28,482	376,047
12199302	Indian River County MPO	Vero Beach	FL	1993	website	136,368	1,785	75,611	59,566	16,045	125,874
13200303	Valdosta-Lowndes MPO	Valdosta	GA	2003	website	79,176	6,324	31,738	28,698	3,040	72,569
12197806	Gainesville MTPO	Gainesville	FL	1978	website	198,376	13,896	90,653	80,895	9,758	187,781
13198200	Warner Robins Area Transportation Study	Warner Robins	GA	1982	website	148,283	1,599	62,008	56,390	5,618	132,467
13196402	Macon Area Transportation Study	Macon	GA	1964	website	167,347	6,051	74,545	64,711	9,834	137,822
13197000	Augusta Regional Transportation Study	Augusta	GA	1970	website	440,134	13,072	187,315	169,165	18,150	384,581
12197802	North Florida Transportation Planning Organization	Jacksonville	FL	1978	website	1,318,305	24,577	588,684	515,285	73,399	1,134,350
13199100	Brunswick Area Transportation Study	Brunswick	GA	1991	website	79,626	1,453	40,716	31,774	8,942	51,024
13200304	Hinesville Area MPO	Hinesville	GA	2003	website	70,695	2,579	29,861	24,712	5,149	51,456
13198301	Coastal Region MPO	Savannah	GA	1983	website	265,128	12,891	119,323	103,038	16,285	249,982
45201300	Lowcountry Area Transportation Study	Yemassee	SC	2013	website	156,894	5,243	87,468	62,178	25,290	68,998
45197700	Charleston Area Transportation Study	North Charleston	SC	1977	website	569,000	13,101	256,475	224,127	32,348	535,322
48197503	Wichita Falls MPO	Washington	TX	1965	website	109,139	11,893	45,570	40,241	5,329	99,437
40197300	Lawton MPO	Lawton	OK	1973	website	86,299	4,225	38,074	33,642	4,432	82,555
48198000	Grayson County MPO	Sherman	TX	1980	website	95,300	2,100	42,057	36,947	5,110	61,900
40196500	Association of Central Oklahoma Governments	Oklahoma City	OK	1965	website	1,140,532	26,952	490,288	447,313	42,975	965,403
20197600	Wichita Area MPO	Wichita	KS	1976	website	518,985	7,514	219,233	200,701	18,532	472,870
20201300	Flint Hills Metropolitan Planning Organization	Manhattan	KS	2013	website	110,441	9,942	40,695	36,792	3,903	54,622
31201300	Grand Island Area Metropolitan Planning Organization	Grand Island	NE	2013	website	52,478	1,058	21,068	19,861	1,207	50,440
31197300	Lincoln Area MPO	Lincoln	NE	1973	website	285,407	13,816	120,875	113,373	7,502	258,719
05197300	Frontier MPO	Fort Smith	AR	1973	website	180,727	2,928	77,132	70,436	6,696	122,947
40197400	Indian Nations COG	Tulsa	OK	1974	website	778,022	12,000	338,585	306,279	32,306	655,479
29198200	Joplin Area Transportation Study Organization	Joplin	MO	1982	website	84,807	2,225	37,772	34,073	3,699	78,654
05200301	Tri-Lakes MPO	Hot Springs	AR	2003	website	90,507	2,145	47,502	38,845	8,657	54,878
05197400	Metroplan	Little Rock	AR	1974	website	621,397	13,521	272,479	248,478	24,001	496,665
05198200	Northwest Arkansas Regional Planning Commission	Springdale	AR	1982	website	424,404	9,624	180,892	158,476	22,416	295,081
29197101	Ozarks Transportation Organization	Springfield	MO	1971	website	307,781	11,724	138,513	126,298	12,215	273,724
20197200	Metropolitan Topeka Planning Organization	Topeka	KS	1972	website	167,657	4,327	75,017	68,740	6,277	149,777
20198200	Lawrence-Douglas County Metropolitan Planning Organization	Lawrence	KS	1982	website	110,823	8,792	46,730	43,575	3,155	88,053
29197401	Mid-America Regional Council	Kansas City	MO	1974	website	2,086,771	29,485	820,478	745,149	75,329	1,604,407
29197102	St. Joseph Area Transportation Study Organization	St. Joseph	MO	1971	website	97,118	4,670	41,634	37,602	4,032	80,727
31197400	Metropolitan Area Planning Agency	Omaha	NE	1974	website	753,949	15,472	314,270	291,216	23,054	724,895
29197402	Columbia Area Transportation Study Organization	Columbia	MO	1974	website	134,591	8,817	57,747	53,164	4,583	124,648
19198300	Des Moines Area MPO	Urbandale	IA	1983	website	475,855	9,091	200,892	187,623	13,269	450,070
46197300	South Eastern COG	Sioux Falls	SD	1973	website	187,553	6,167	78,597	73,532	5,065	156,777
38197200	Fargo-Moorhead Metropolitan COG	Fargo	ND	1972	website	187,695	8,638	82,816	77,942	4,874	176,676
38198202	Grand Forks-East Grand Forks MPO	Grand Forks	ND	1982	website	63,281	3,820	27,773	26,428	1,345	61,270
19196600	Sioux City MPO	Sioux City	IA	1966	website	115,153	2,800	45,421	42,984	2,437	106,020
19200300	Ames Area MPO	Ames	IA	2003	website	59,824	7,767	24,263	23,126	1,137	59,281
19197300	Black Hawk Metropolitan Area Transportation Policy Board	Waterloo	IA	1973	website	121,066	5,920	51,749	48,577	3,172	113,418
27197200	Rochester-Olmsted COG	Rochester	MN	1972	website	148,041	2,910	62,176	58,644	3,532	107,677
27201300	Mankato / North Mankato Area Planning Organization	Mankato	MN	2013	website	61,764	4,508	25,237	23,847	1,390	57,584
27197000	St. Cloud Area Planning Organization	St. Cloud	MN	1970	website	130,191	8,279	52,793	49,455	3,338	110,621
27197300	Metropolitan Council	St. Paul	MN	1973	website	2,849,557	55,023	1,186,983	1,117,745	69,238	2,597,407
05196400	Southeast Arkansas Regional Planning Commission	Pine Bluff	AR	1964	website	67,809	4,102	28,935	25,517	3,418	53,495
05198300	West Memphis Area Transportation Study	West Memphis	AR	1983	website	42,214	701	17,382	15,714	1,668	40,270
05200302	Jonesboro Area Transportation Study	Jonesboro	AR	2003	website	83,143	3,412	34,712	32,079	2,633	65,419
47197702	Memphis Urban Area MPO	Memphis	TN	1977	website	1,077,697	19,101	471,805	419,729	52,076	1,019,791
47198202	Jackson Urban Area MPO	Jackson	TN	1982	website	98,294	4,418	41,877	38,073	3,804	71,880
29201300	Southeast Metropolitan Planning Organization (SEMPO)	Cape Girardeau	MO	2013	website	59,448	3,681	25,722	23,628	2,094	52,900
17201300	Southern Illinois Metropolitan Planning Organization	Marion	IL	2013	website	89,980	4,878	42,727	38,449	4,278	67,821
29200300	Capital Area MPO	Jefferson City	MO	2003	website	71,347	4,982	30,587	28,247	2,340	58,248
29197300	East-West Gateway Council of Government	St. Louis	MO-IL	1973	website	2,571,253	48,246	1,132,842	1,027,694	105,148	2,234,522
19198000	Johnson County COG	Iowa City	IA	1980	website	109,446	7,715	47,451	44,719	2,732	106,212
17196600	Bi-State Regional Commission	Rock Island	IL	1966	website	296,845	7,619	130,884	121,898	8,986	280,051
17196202	Springfield Area Transportation Study	Springfield	IL	1962	website	169,319	3,908	78,340	72,095	6,245	161,316
17197600	Tri-County Regional Planning Commission	Peoria	IL	1976	website	305,366	7,857	133,447	123,456	9,991	266,921
17196403	Decatur Urbanized Area Transportation Study	Decatur	IL	1964	website	101,540	4,036	46,536	42,224	4,312	93,863
17196700	McLean County Regional Planning Commission	Bloomington	IL	1967	website	137,415	10,566	56,368	52,719	3,649	131,548
17196402	Champaign County Regional Planning Commission	Urbana	IL	1964	website	144,361	15,739	63,719	58,729	4,990	141,922
17196201	Chicago Metropolitan Agency for Planning	Chicago	IL	1962	website	8,444,660	140,334	3,377,287	3,092,414	284,873	8,271,486
01197402	Shoals Area MPO	Muscle Shoals	AL	1974	website	93,146	2,242	44,504	39,882	4,622	76,166
01198200	North Central Alabama Regional Council of Govts	Decatur	AL	1982	website	88,775	1,782	38,106	35,223	2,883	70,436
01196402	Gadsden-Etowah MPO	Gadsden	AL	1964	website	86,857	2,115	39,858	35,282	4,576	64,172
01197601	Huntsville MPO	Huntsville	AL	1976	website	357,858	10,384	154,672	142,404	12,268	286,692
47197802	Clarksville Urbanized Area MPO	Clarksville	TN	1978	website	175,269	6,751	69,191	62,537	6,654	156,899
21197402	Owensboro-Daviess County MPO	Owensboro	KY	1974	website	96,636	2,581	41,444	38,611	2,833	70,543
47197701	Greater Nashville Regional Council	Nashville	TN	1977	website	1,382,526	35,290	581,311	537,346	43,965	1,101,479
21200202	Bowling Green-Warren County MPO	Bowling Green	KY	2002	website	113,792	6,210	47,223	43,674	3,549	78,306
21200201	Radcliff-Elizabethtown MPO	Elizabethtown	KY	2002	website	130,492	3,468	53,462	48,936	4,526	73,467
01197602	Calhoun Area Metropolitan Planning Organization	Anniston	AL	1976	website	100,032	2,838	44,773	39,904	4,869	79,796
13198302	Rome/Floyd County MPO	Rome	GA	1983	website	96,317	3,733	40,551	35,930	4,621	60,851
13200302	Greater Dalton MPO	Dalton	GA	2003	website	102,451	1,002	39,827	35,125	4,702	72,766
47197703	Chattanooga-Hamilton County/North Georgia Transportation Planning Orga	Chattanooga	TN-GA	1977	website	436,669	11,160	193,797	175,289	18,508	380,897
13201300	Cartersville-Bartow Metropolitan Planning Organization	Cartersville	GA	2013	website	90,128	990	35,696	32,132	3,564	51,654
13197100	Atlanta Regional Commission	Atlanta	GA	1971	website	4,819,026	73,364	1,979,911	1,775,021	204,890	4,471,045
47200302	Cleveland Area MPO	Cleveland	TN	2003	website	64,410	2,713	27,220	24,826	2,394	62,933
47197801	Knoxville Regional Transportation Planning Organization	Knoxville	TN	1978	website	542,827	14,467	242,989	221,452	21,537	489,503
18198600	Evansville MPO	Evansville	IN	1986	website	286,110	9,422	127,731	115,858	11,873	228,203
18197502	Terre Haute Area MPO	Terre Haute	IN	1975	website	107,848	9,545	46,006	41,361	4,645	82,225
18198201	Bloomington/Monroe County Metropolitan Planning Organization	Bloomington	IN	1982	website	114,718	14,960	48,229	45,423	2,806	108,652
18197800	Indianapolis MPO	Indianapolis	IN	1978	website	1,518,800	23,914	657,530	590,753	66,777	1,456,540
17200301	Danville Area Transportation Study	Danville	IL	2003	website	58,000	2,824	25,938	23,190	2,748	50,996
17198300	Kankakee County Regional Planning Commission	Kankakee	IL	1983	website	86,150	4,850	33,699	31,180	2,519	81,422
18197501	Northwest Indiana Regional Planning Commission	Portage	IN	1975	website	771,648	16,377	323,299	292,413	30,886	654,755
18197601	Area Plan Commission of Tippecanoe County	Lafayette	IN	1976	website	172,780	14,463	71,096	65,532	5,564	147,725
18198202	Kokomo & Howard County Governmental Coordinating Council	Kokomo	IN	1982	website	68,479	1,168	32,883	28,914	3,969	61,505
26197402	Southwest Michigan Planning Commission	Benton Harbor	MI	1974	website	127,004	1,827	59,042	51,221	7,821	97,622
18197401	Michiana Area COG	South Bend	IN	1974	website	464,490	15,076	192,616	173,313	19,303	384,562
21197300	Kentuckiana Regional Planning and Development Agency	Louisville	KY	1973	website	1,062,346	22,624	467,775	430,401	37,374	972,546
18200300	Columbus Area MPO	Columbus	IN	2003	website	83,571	1,152	35,931	32,466	3,465	55,061
21197401	Lexington Area MPO	Lexington	KY	1974	website	344,389	14,583	154,491	140,685	13,806	289,168
39197400	Ohio-Kentucky-Indiana Regional Council of Governments	Cincinnati	OH	1974	website	1,981,230	44,614	854,111	774,825	79,286	1,726,832
39197302	Miami Valley Regional Planning Commission	Dayton	OH	1973	website	832,161	24,289	380,271	339,790	40,481	713,869
18196900	Madison County COG	Anderson	IN	1969	website	140,839	6,277	62,929	55,526	7,403	97,422
18197602	Delaware-Muncie Metropolitan Plan Commission	Muncie	IN	1976	website	105,288	8,823	46,914	41,587	5,327	90,580
18197402	Northeastern Indiana Regional Coordinating Council	Ft. Wayne	IN	1974	website	333,752	6,114	144,314	130,428	13,886	313,492
39196402	Lima-Allen County Regional Planning Commission	Lima	OH	1964	website	111,551	6,030	47,335	42,788	4,547	72,852
19196400	Corridor Metropolitan Planning Organization	Cedar Rapids	IA	1964	website	190,987	4,102	84,279	78,750	5,529	177,844
19197400	East Central Intergovernmental Association	Dubuque	IA	1974	website	80,992	4,050	33,985	32,128	1,857	67,818
55196700	La Crosse Area Planning Committee	La Crosse	WI	1967	website	114,874	5,286	48,637	46,406	2,231	100,705
55198201	Chippewa-Eau Claire MPO	Eau Claire	WI	1982	website	112,671	5,514	48,505	45,723	2,782	102,852
55197100	Madison Area Transportation Planning Board	Madison	WI	1971	website	401,808	12,269	181,308	170,748	10,560	385,281
17196401	Region One Planning Council (R1PC)	Rockford	IL	1964	website	308,390	4,791	129,163	118,611	10,552	294,972
17200302	DeKalb Sycamore Area Transportation Study	DeKalb	IL	2003	website	70,838	6,438	27,692	25,944	1,748	68,545
55197499	State Line Area Transportation Study	Beloit	WI	1974	website	69,441	1,701	28,485	26,204	2,281	64,600
55198203	Janesville Area MPO	Janesville	WI	1982	website	77,940	1,018	33,921	31,349	2,572	70,748
55196100	Southeastern Wisconsin Regional Planning Commission	Waukesha	WI	1961	website	2,019,767	45,392	872,724	799,996	72,728	1,731,072
55197302	Oshkosh MPO	Menasha	WI	1973	website	77,116	7,532	32,703	30,352	2,351	74,518
55200200	Fond du Lac Area MPO	Menasha	WI	2002	website	58,537	2,109	25,827	24,171	1,656	53,420
55198300	Wausau Metropolitan Planning Organization	Wausau	WI	1983	website	89,261	1,420	39,296	36,196	3,100	74,632
55197301	Appleton/Fox Cities MPO	Menasha	WI	1973	website	229,171	3,490	97,136	92,408	4,728	213,416
27197500	Duluth-Superior Metropolitan Interstate Council	Duluth	MN	1975	website	147,533	9,049	64,585	60,325	4,260	120,362
55198202	Sheboygan MPO	Green Bay	WI	1982	website	75,790	1,045	33,935	31,252	2,683	71,313
26199100	Macatawa Area Coordinating Council	Holland	MI	1991	website	119,125	3,772	47,372	42,772	4,600	100,145
26197302	West Michigan Shoreline Regional Development Commission	Muskegon	MI	1973	website	225,014	6,855	97,714	86,600	11,114	161,076
55197400	Green Bay MPO	Green Bay	WI	1974	website	216,347	6,530	92,070	86,658	5,412	205,833
26197900	Kalamazoo Area Transportation Study	Kalamazoo	MI	1979	website	250,331	8,455	110,007	100,610	9,397	206,405
26197403	Battle Creek Area Transportation Study	Springfield	MI	1974	website	91,083	2,214	41,550	36,724	4,826	77,325
26199000	Grand Valley Metropolitan Council	Grand Rapids	MI	1990	website	692,019	15,383	277,988	257,061	20,927	568,689
26196800	Region 2 Planning Commission	Jackson	MI	1968	website	160,253	9,672	69,459	60,772	8,687	90,057
26197301	Tri-County Regional Planning Commission	Lansing	MI	1973	website	464,036	20,717	199,026	183,422	15,604	313,293
26196500	Saginaw Metropolitan Area Transportation Study	Saginaw	MI	1965	website	200,170	7,116	86,845	79,012	7,833	132,908
26201300	Midland Area Transportation Study	Midland	MI	2013	website	90,645	1,314	38,906	36,244	2,662	51,972
26197404	Bay City Area Transportation Study	Bay City	MI	1974	website	87,959	1,344	39,818	36,785	3,033	70,746
13196900	Madison Athens-Clarke Oconee Regional Transportation Study	Athens	GA	1969	website	151,973	9,215	64,761	58,115	6,646	128,456
13200301	Gainesville-Hall MPO	Gainesville	GA	2003	website	179,642	3,141	68,811	60,680	8,131	140,189
45199300	Anderson Area Transportation Study	Anderson	SC	1993	website	94,673	2,616	43,331	37,932	5,399	75,588
45196200	Greenville-Pickens Area Transportation Study	Greenville	SC	1962	website	547,397	11,007	235,226	213,706	21,520	475,885
37197000	French Broad River MPO	Asheville	NC	1970	website	374,632	9,173	187,419	159,376	28,043	276,564
45197500	Spartanburg Area Transportation Study	Spartanburg	SC	1975	website	222,968	6,287	96,885	86,260	10,625	181,250
47200301	Lakeway MPO	Morristown	TN	2003	website	81,648	2,029	35,056	31,744	3,312	58,810
47198201	Johnson City Metropolitan Transportation Planning Organization	Johnson City	TN	1982	website	139,408	5,796	65,494	58,709	6,785	117,279
47197704	Kingsport MTPO	Kingsport	TN	1977	website	125,260	1,251	59,149	53,334	5,815	101,667
47198203	Bristol MPO	Bristol	TN	1982	website	93,307	1,883	43,858	39,356	4,502	61,876
45197000	Columbia Area Transportation Study	Columbia	SC	1970	website	621,308	34,295	264,396	238,164	26,232	540,840
45198300	Rock Hill-Fort Mill Area Transportation Study	Rock Hill	SC	1983	website	174,406	3,328	73,144	66,658	6,486	156,569
37197403	Gaston Cleveland Lincoln MPO	Gastonia	NC	1974	website	181,096	3,135	77,862	70,172	7,690	157,360
45199100	Sumter Area Transportation Study	Sumter	SC	1966	website	85,635	1,901	36,967	32,464	4,503	71,494
45198200	Florence Area Transportation Study	Florence	SC	1982	website	96,084	2,910	41,406	37,407	3,999	76,366
37197900	Charlotte Regional Transportation Planning Organization	Charlotte	NC	1979	website	1,098,657	17,945	462,461	421,931	40,530	1,053,737
37198002	Cabarrus-Rowan MPO	Concord	NC	1980	website	316,427	5,766	132,144	118,802	13,342	228,238
37198201	Greater Hickory MPO	Hickory	NC	1982	website	273,531	4,947	121,030	108,979	12,051	209,548
37197401	Winston-Salem Area Transportation Planning Organization	Winston-Salem	NC	1974	website	397,772	10,185	177,062	159,932	17,130	358,249
37198003	High Point Urban Area MPO	High Point	NC	1980	website	200,492	4,286	88,433	79,047	9,386	168,654
37196000	Greensboro Urban Area MPO	Greensboro	NC	1960	website	370,025	11,888	165,071	149,921	15,150	312,474
51200301	New River Valley MPO	Christiansburg	VA	2003	website	79,260	9,225	31,918	29,773	2,145	70,040
51197402	Roanoke Valley MPO	Roanoke	VA	1974	website	227,507	6,160	103,756	95,553	8,203	209,238
21198800	Ashland Area MPO	Grayson	KY	1988	website	86,444	2,792	38,129	34,454	3,675	56,594
54197400	KYOVA Interstate Planning Commission	Huntington	WV	1974	website	201,199	4,851	92,979	83,524	9,455	123,496
39196401	Clark County-Springfield Transportation Study (Transportation Coordinating Committee)	Springfield	OH	1964	website	138,335	2,798	61,419	55,244	6,175	105,679
39197301	Mid-Ohio Regional Planning Commission	Columbus	OH	1973	website	1,426,183	27,868	626,771	571,422	55,349	1,359,272
39197500	Lake Erie West Regional Council	Toledo	OH	1975	website	567,303	16,945	256,006	229,310	26,696	473,892
39198200	Licking County Area Transportation Study	Newark	OH	1982	website	138,039	3,357	58,954	53,869	5,085	78,682
39196203	Richland County Regional Planning Commission	Mansfield	OH	1962	website	124,475	7,263	54,599	48,921	5,678	75,250
39200300	Policy Committee of the Erie Regional Planning Commission	Sandusky	OH	2003	website	82,976	1,800	40,428	34,135	6,293	11,626
54197501	BCKP Regional Intergovernmental Council	South Charleston	WV	1975	website	248,546	3,388	116,055	106,182	9,873	175,746
54201300	Fayette/Raleigh MPO (FRMPO)	Beckley	WV	2014	website	124,898	5,697	57,549	50,644	6,905	64,022
54197503	Wood-Washington-Wirt Interstate Planning Commission	Parkersburg	WV	1975	website	129,835	2,780	59,954	54,654	5,300	67,229
54200300	Morgantown Monongalia MPO	Morgantown	WV	2003	website	96,183	7,262	43,234	39,773	3,461	70,350
39196202	Stark County Area Transportation Study	Canton	OH	1962	website	375,541	9,264	165,200	151,075	14,125	296,853
54197502	Belmont-Ohio-Marshall Transportation Study	Wheeling	WV	1975	website	147,952	6,899	69,544	61,463	8,081	78,632
39196800	Northeast Ohio Areawide Coordinating Agency	Cleveland	OH	1968	website	2,071,325	43,308	953,160	852,606	100,554	1,866,053
39196201	Akron Metropolitan Area Transportation Study	Akron	OH	1962	website	713,314	18,026	316,684	288,894	27,790	629,064
39197303	Eastgate Regional COG	Youngstown	OH	1973	website	448,970	11,746	207,917	184,652	23,265	348,030
39197304	Brooke-Hancock-Jefferson Metropolitan Planning Commission	Steubenville	OH	1968	website	124,458	3,310	58,334	52,428	5,906	73,204
42197400	Southwestern Pennsylvania Commission	Pittsburgh	PA	1974	website	2,574,953	73,351	1,197,707	1,088,480	109,227	1,852,045
42198202	Shenango Valley Area Transportation Study	Hermitage	PA	1982	website	116,638	6,714	51,733	46,442	5,291	39,043
45199200	Grand-Strand Area Transportation Study	Georgetown	SC	1992	website	257,836	3,361	188,066	109,517	78,549	193,806
37197402	Fayetteville Area MPO	Fayetteville	NC	1974	website	325,323	10,030	137,763	124,060	13,703	297,190
37197800	Wilmington Urban Area MPO	Wilmington	NC	1978	website	241,842	6,985	119,169	101,799	17,370	219,231
37198202	Goldsboro Urban Area MPO	Goldsboro	NC	1982	website	91,112	2,680	39,477	35,846	3,631	60,265
37197300	Burlington-Graham MPO	Burlington	NC	1973	website	162,718	4,235	71,874	64,795	7,079	117,448
51198300	Danville MPO	Martinsville	VA	1983	website	65,689	1,542	32,887	28,096	4,791	0
37198001	Durham-Chapel Hill-Carrboro MPO	Durham	NC	1980	website	392,791	19,766	173,045	158,198	14,847	350,110
51197900	Central Virginia Transportation Planning Organization	Lynchburg	VA	1979	website	153,316	11,570	65,026	59,231	5,795	116,636
37196400	Capital Area MPO	Raleigh	NC	1964	website	1,071,012	21,767	439,493	408,141	31,352	882,383
37199202	Rocky Mount Urban Area MPO	Rocky Mount	NC	1992	website	79,968	1,809	36,593	32,005	4,588	64,522
37198004	Jacksonville Urban Area MPO	Jacksonville	NC	1980	website	126,132	16,496	43,238	40,564	2,674	105,369
37199201	Greenville Urban Area MPO	Greenville	NC	1992	website	133,742	6,447	60,320	54,364	5,956	117,798
37201300	New Bern Area MPO	New Bern	NC	2013	website	56,746	1,111	26,466	23,712	2,754	50,503
51197403	Tri Cities Area MPO	Petersburg	VA	1974	website	149,029	9,809	61,271	55,311	5,960	123,350
51197401	Richmond Regional Transportation Planning Organization (RRTPO)	Richmond	VA	1974	website	934,060	19,184	396,236	368,199	28,037	830,206
51199100	Hampton Roads Transportation Planning Organization	Chesapeake	VA	1991	website	1,618,505	68,897	656,894	607,840	49,054	1,515,355
51201200	Staunton-Augusta-Waynesboro MPO	Staunton	VA	2012	website	74,964	2,635	34,159	31,221	2,938	56,611
51200303	Harrisonburg-Rockingham MPO	Harrisonburg	VA	2003	website	74,365	8,918	27,507	25,458	2,049	66,777
24198200	Cumberland Area MPO	Cumberland	MD	1982	website	75,091	7,924	33,314	29,178	4,136	49,619
51198200	Charlottesville-Albemarle MPO	Charlottesville	VA	1982	website	113,074	9,093	48,260	44,402	3,858	92,359
51200302	Winchester-Frederick County MPO	Front Royal	VA	2003	website	78,440	1,861	32,233	29,695	2,538	69,332
24198600	Hagerstown-Eastern Panhandle MPO	Hagerstown	MD	1986	website	323,989	10,756	135,102	122,583	12,519	182,696
42196503	Cambria County MPO	Ebensburg	PA	1965	website	151,986	8,223	69,643	62,633	7,010	67,011
42196504	Blair County Planning Commission	Altoona	PA	1965	website	127,089	3,672	56,276	52,159	4,117	79,930
42201313	Franklin County MPO	Chambersburg	PA	2013	website	149,635	2,696	63,228	58,397	4,831	60,390
42198201	Centre County MPO	State College	PA	1982	website	154,016	16,989	63,303	57,579	5,724	87,454
51199200	Fredericksburg Area MPO	Fredericksburg	VA	1992	website	275,639	6,713	99,626	93,213	6,413	210,317
11196500	National Capital Region Transportation Planning Board	Washington	DC-MD-VA	1965	website	5,068,540	92,500	2,018,264	1,894,954	123,310	4,818,742
24199200	Baltimore Regional Transportation Board	Baltimore	MD	1992	website	2,662,204	68,497	1,111,823	1,020,524	91,299	2,418,178
24200400	Salisbury-Wicomico MPO	Salisbury	MD	2004	website	76,494	4,345	31,536	28,659	2,877	73,048
10199000	Dover / Kent County MPO	Camden	DE	1990	website	167,364	4,435	67,369	62,160	5,209	108,113
10197100	Wilmington Area Planning Council	Newark	DE	1971	website	639,457	18,705	258,534	239,446	19,088	542,692
42201314	Adams County Transportation Planning Organization	Gettysburg	PA	2013	website	101,407	3,993	40,820	38,013	2,807	31,255
42196502	Harrisburg Area Transportation Study	Harrisburg	PA	1965	website	571,842	20,497	250,490	231,532	18,958	409,972
42196404	York Area MPO	York	PA	1964	website	434,962	8,430	178,662	168,367	10,295	306,062
42201312	Susquehanna Economic Development Association Council of Governments	Lewisburg	PA	2013	website	375,261	23,576	167,110	145,987	21,123	49,577
42196800	Williamsport Area Transportation Study	Williamsport	PA	1968	website	116,102	5,437	52,491	46,697	5,794	56,142
42196403	Lancaster County Transportation Coordinating Committee	Lancaster	PA	1964	website	519,430	12,638	202,946	193,594	9,352	401,726
42200300	Lebanon County MPO	Lebanon	PA	2003	website	111,189	3,427	45,916	43,002	2,914	79,436
42196405	Reading Area Transportation Study	Reading	PA	1964	website	411,440	12,023	164,826	154,355	10,471	301,388
42196402	Lackawanna/Luzerne MPO	Scranton	PA	1964	website	535,334	19,854	245,558	219,148	26,410	433,444
42201311	Northeastern Pennsylvania Alliance MPO	Pittston	PA	2013	website	440,670	11,747	222,304	169,865	52,439	24,549
26197401	Southeast Michigan COG	Detroit	MI	1974	website	4,703,593	66,202	2,060,049	1,844,201	215,848	4,328,651
26196300	Genesee County Metropolitan Planning Commission	Flint	MI	1963	website	425,788	5,973	192,179	169,201	22,978	351,608
42196406	Erie MPO	Erie	PA	1964	website	280,566	12,875	119,138	110,413	8,725	196,611
36197401	Greater Buffalo-Niagara Regional Transportation Council	Buffalo	NY	1974	website	1,135,511	32,706	519,094	473,721	45,373	935,906
36197700	Genesee Transportation Council	Rochester	NY	1977	website	841,567	27,235	361,633	338,916	22,717	719,519
36197500	Elmira-Chemung Transportation Council	Elmira	NY	1975	website	88,831	4,916	38,370	35,463	2,907	67,352
36199200	Ithaca-Tompkins County Transportation Council	Ithaca	NY	1992	website	101,566	13,232	41,676	38,968	2,708	53,661
36197402	Binghamton Metropolitan Transportation Study	Binghamton	NY	1974	website	215,413	10,423	96,308	88,286	8,022	155,629
36196500	Syracuse Metropolitan Transportation Council	Syracuse	NY	1965	website	476,845	17,080	206,997	191,876	15,121	411,924
36201400	Watertown-Jefferson County Transportation Council	Watertown	NY	2014	website	66,322	5,286	26,651	24,434	2,217	57,840
34199300		Vineland	NJ	1993	website	594,419	22,042	307,361	220,661	86,700	414,657
42196501	Delaware Valley Regional Planning Commission	Philadelphia	PA-NJ	1965	website	5,626,318	166,669	2,290,834	2,128,735	162,099	5,366,941
42196401	Lehigh Valley Transportation Study	Allentown	PA	1964	website	663,158	19,708	270,145	254,154	15,991	596,723
34198200	North Jersey Transportation Planning Authority	Newark	NJ	1982	website	6,579,801	121,178	2,611,779	2,398,718	213,061	6,187,812
36198202	Orange County Transportation Council	Goshen	NY	1982	website	372,815	12,230	137,026	125,926	11,100	228,880
36200300	Ulster County Transportation Council	Kingston	NY	2003	website	182,491	11,773	83,637	71,048	12,589	88,968
36198201	New York Metropolitan Transportation Council	New York	NY	1982	website	12,367,508	275,081	4,921,831	4,539,298	382,533	12,241,241
09198100	South Western MPO	Stamford	CT	1981	website	363,963	3,318	146,506	136,247	10,259	354,299
36198203	Dutchess County Transportation Council	Poughkeepsie	NY	1982	website	297,508	19,965	118,649	107,971	10,678	212,235
09197504	Housatonic Valley MPO	Brookfield	CT	1975	website	224,621	5,582	88,358	81,250	7,108	191,385
09198101	Greater Bridgeport / Valley MPO	Bridgeport	CT	1982	website	406,161	11,066	159,611	148,681	10,930	398,609
09197502	Naugatuck Valley Council of Governments	Waterbury	CT	1975	website	287,898	6,330	119,032	109,787	9,245	260,375
09197503	Central Connecticut Regional Planning Agency	Bristol	CT	1975	website	235,899	4,745	100,398	93,786	6,612	222,976
09197401	South Central Regional COG	North Haven	CT	1974	website	569,816	22,762	240,497	222,549	17,948	553,652
09197501	Capitol Region COG	Hartford	CT	1975	website	757,215	26,472	314,366	295,405	18,961	693,949
09201499	Lower Connecticut River Valley MPO	Old Saybrook	CT	2014	website	175,636	5,106	80,980	71,386	9,594	118,173
09197402	Southeastern Connecticut COG	Norwich	CT	1974	website	256,139	12,650	111,137	99,856	11,281	181,825
44197400	State Planning Council	Providence	RI	1974	website	1,052,527	42,663	463,358	413,573	49,785	952,061
25199800	Southeastern Massachusetts MPO	Taunton	MA	1998	website	616,689	14,828	263,492	240,220	23,272	533,851
25199000	Cape Cod MPO	Barnstable	MA	1990	website	215,881	3,961	160,259	95,749	64,510	196,581
36197200	Herkimer-Oneida Counties Transportation Study	Utica	NY	1972	website	299,541	14,831	137,614	119,404	18,210	117,328
36197300	Capital Region Transportation Council	Albany	NY	1973	website	823,239	30,513	370,113	336,441	33,672	659,062
36198204	Adirondack/Glens Falls Transportation Council	Glens Falls	NY	1982	website	143,664	4,404	73,540	57,830	15,710	65,443
25197202	Berkshire MPO	Pittsfield	MA	1972	website	131,232	6,159	68,511	56,094	12,417	59,124
25197601	Pioneer Valley MPO	Springfield	MA	1976	website	621,823	35,623	254,900	238,730	16,170	531,855
25197602	Central Massachusetts MPO	Worcester	MA	1976	website	556,910	18,582	226,274	210,948	15,326	455,740
25198700	Montachusett MPO	Fitchburg	MA	1987	website	236,482	10,047	98,440	89,818	8,622	164,303
33197302	Nashua Regional Planning Commission	Nashua	NH	1973	website	204,393	2,067	82,004	77,970	4,034	167,448
25197604	Northern Middlesex MPO	Lowell	MA	1976	website	286,951	6,200	109,465	104,040	5,425	277,707
33197301	Southern New Hampshire Planning Commission	Manchester	NH	1973	website	261,258	6,146	106,827	100,319	6,508	209,295
50198300	Chittenden County RPC	Winooski	VT	1983	website	156,567	9,795	65,730	61,835	3,895	108,740
25197300	Boston Region MPO	Boston	MA	1973	website	3,159,512	124,400	1,320,536	1,241,958	78,578	3,102,694
25197201	Old Colony MPO	Brockton	MA	1972	website	288,628	11,575	110,526	102,829	7,697	272,216
25197603	Merrimack Valley MPO	Haverhill	MA	1976	website	333,357	5,825	131,368	123,360	8,008	316,571
33197200	Rockingham Planning Commission	Exeter	NH	1972	website	191,906	2,166	85,427	76,610	8,817	152,386
33198200	Strafford Regional Planning Commission	Dover	NH	1982	website	146,865	8,433	64,171	56,672	7,499	87,751
23198202	Kittery Area Comprehensive Transportation System	Springvale	ME	1982	website	48,680	207	24,568	19,910	4,658	23,576
23197500	Portland Area Comprehensive Transportation System	Portland	ME	1975	website	264,225	8,402	124,722	111,077	13,645	203,494
23196400	Androscoggin Transportation Resource Center	Auburn	ME	1964	website	73,614	2,665	33,860	30,955	2,905	59,397
23198201	Bangor Area Comprehensive Transportation System	Brewer	ME	1982	website	67,763	6,720	30,017	27,928	2,089	61,210
72197303	Aguadilla MPO	Santurce	PR	1973	website	316,151	2,357	142,824	117,834	24,990	284,375
72197302	UZA's MPO	Santurce	PR	1973	website	1,156,412	13,475	514,561	423,818	90,743	929,029
72197301	San Juan MPO	Santurce	PR	1973	website	2,241,853	22,117	971,844	830,338	141,506	2,166,418

== See also ==
- Metropolitan planning organization
- Conurbation
- Land-use planning
- Regional planning
- Zoning
