= Metropolitan planning organizations of New Jersey =

There are three metropolitan planning organizations (MPOs) in New Jersey. The organizations are the main decision-making forums for selecting projects for the Statewide Transportation Improvement Program (STIP) in deliberations involving the New Jersey Department of Transportation (NJDOT), the New Jersey Transit Corporation (NJT), county and municipal transportation planners and engineers, other transportation implementing agencies, the public and elected officials at the state, county, and municipal levels.

The state’s three MPOs are:

- The North Jersey Transportation Planning Authority (NJTPA), MPO ID# 34198200, includes Bergen, Essex, Hudson, Hunterdon, Middlesex, Monmouth, Morris, Ocean, Passaic, Somerset, Sussex, Union, and Warren counties in the Gateway Region, Skylands Region, and on northern Jersey Shore.
- The Delaware Valley Regional Planning Commission (DVRPC), MPO ID# 42196501, includes Burlington, Camden, Gloucester and Mercer counties in New Jersey as well Bucks, Chester, Delaware, Monthomery, and Philadelphia in Pennsylvania in the Philadelphia metropolitan area
- The South Jersey Transportation Planning Organization (SJTPO), MPO ID# 34199300, covering Atlantic, Cape May, Cumberland and Salem counties in South Jersey.

Projects that are identified as potential candidates for inclusion in the regional transportation improvement programs of each of the three MPOs are subject to intensive screening to verify project scope, status, schedule, and cost. The resulting “pool” of projects is analyzed independently by NJDOT, NJ Transit, and the MPOs to assign each project a priority based on the extent to which it would advance identified regional and statewide objectives, such as objectives set forth in the state and regional long-range transportation plans, the New Jersey Capital Investment Strategy, air quality objectives, and the broad social and economic goals of the State Development and Redevelopment Plan.

NJDOT develops and circulates revenue projections for planning purposes to each of the MPOs, based on the best current assessment of available state, federal, and other funds. NJDOT, NJ Transit and each of the three MPOs after intensive discussions and forums negotiate a list of deliverable transportation projects that best fit the composite statewide and regional priorities within a financially constrained program.

== See also ==
- List of metropolitan planning organizations in the United States
- Regional Plan Association
- Port Authority of New York and New Jersey
- New York Metropolitan Transportation Council
- South Jersey Transportation Authority
- Delaware River Port Authority
- Delaware River and Bay Authority
- Delaware River Joint Toll Bridge Commission
- New Jersey Turnpike Authority
- New Jersey Sports and Exposition Authority
- New Jersey Transit
