= North Jersey Transportation Planning Authority =

State agency of New Jersey, United States

Metropolitan planning organization overview
- Jurisdiction: Northern New Jersey and Central New Jersey
- Headquarters: One Newark Center Newark, New Jersey, United States
- Metropolitan planning organization executives: David Behrend, Executive Director; Middlesex County Commissioner Charles Kenny, Chair

The North Jersey Transportation Planning Authority (NJTPA) is the federally authorized metropolitan planning organization (MPO) for the 13-county northern New Jersey region, one of three MPOs in the state. NJTPA's annual budget is more than $2 billion for transportation improvement projects. The Authority also participates in inter-agency cooperation and receives public input into funding decisions. The NJTPA sponsors and conducts studies, assists county planning agencies and monitors compliance with national air quality goals. The Authority provides federal funding to support the planning work of its 15 subregions. The funds are matched by a local contribution. As vital partners in regional planning work, the subregions help bring a local perspective to all aspects of NJTPA's work to improve the northern New Jersey transportation network.

When Union County Freeholder Angel Estrada was elected Chair of the NJTPA Board of Trustees on January 22, 2018, he became the first Latino to hold that position.

== Formation ==
NJTPA was created in 1982 after the disbanding of the Tri-State Regional Planning Commission, a metropolitan planning organization for the states of New York, New Jersey, and Connecticut.

== Area ==
The NJTPA region consists of 15 subregions each represented on the NJTPA Board. The states two largest cities, Newark and Jersey City and the 13 counties of Bergen, Essex, Hudson, Hunterdon, Middlesex, Monmouth, Ocean, Morris, Passaic, Somerset, Sussex, Union, and Warren are represented. Together they comprise the Gateway Region, Skylands Region, and northern Jersey Shore.

== Regional partners ==
Along with member agencies the New Jersey Department of Transportation (NJDOT), New Jersey Transit, State of NJ Office of the Governor, and the Port Authority of New York and New Jersey. These regional partners carry out transportation planning work that helps NJTPA identify and address regional-level transportation needs.

== Board and Committees ==
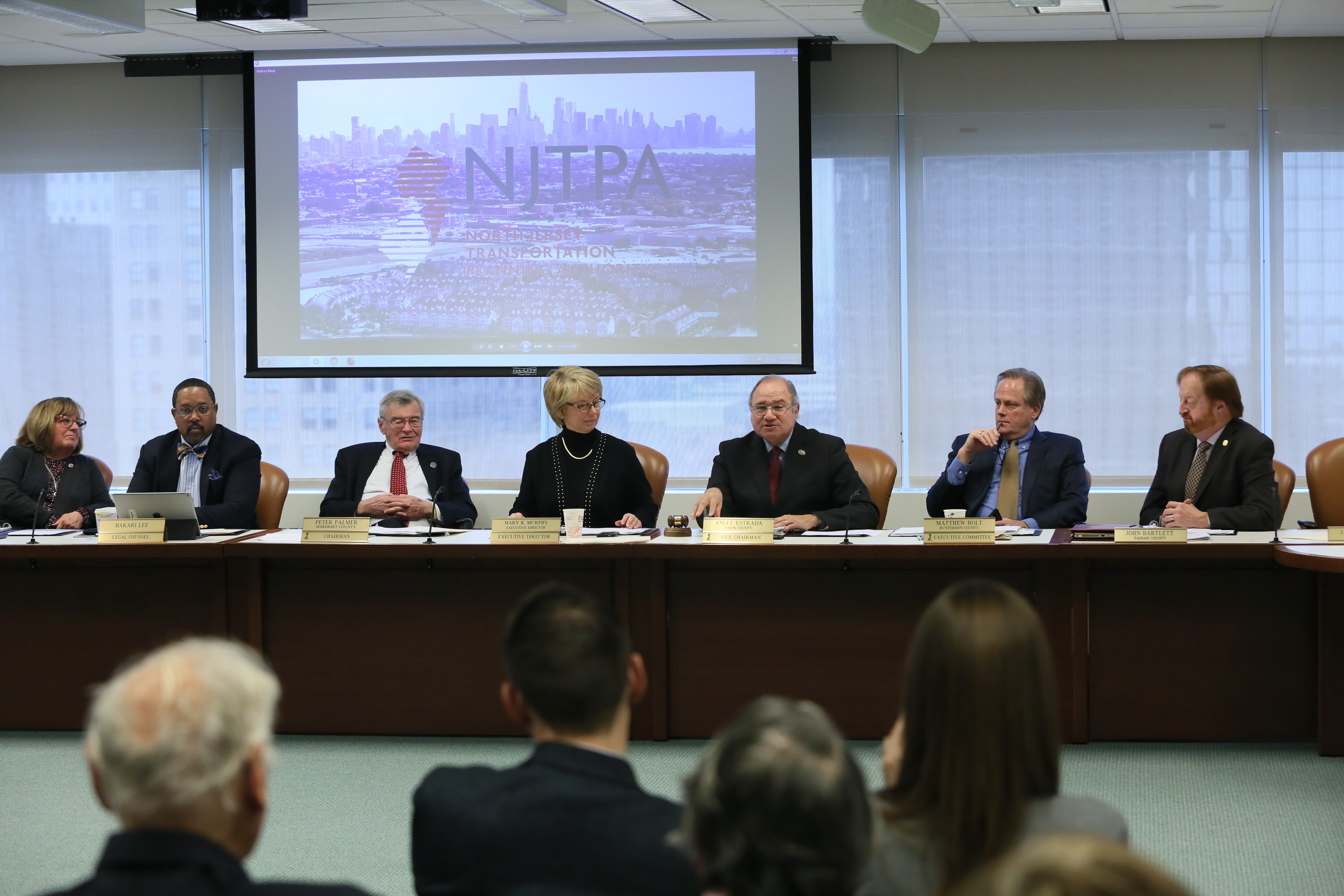
NJTPA Board of Trustees Meeting January 22, 2018

The NJTPA Board of Trustees includes 15 local elected officials, including one representative from each of the 13 member counties as well as from Newark and Jersey City. The Board also includes a Governor's representative, the Commissioner of the NJDOT, the Executive Director of NJ TRANSIT, the Chairman of the Port Authority of New York & New Jersey and a citizen's representative. Board membership is an uncompensated position.

Every two years the Board elects a new Executive Committee, which provides guidance and leadership to the full Board on a wide range of planning, policy and administrative issues. It meets as needed to review financial, personnel and policy matters. Middlesex County Commissioner Charles Kenny was elected Chair of the Board for the 2026-2027 term. The Board elected Warren County Commissioner Jason J. Sarnoski as First Vice Chair; Union County Commissioner Michèle S. Delisfort as Second Vice Chair; and Somerset County Commissioner Sara Sooy as Secretary. In accordance with the bylaws, Chairman Kenny appointed Morris County Commissioner Stephen H. Shaw as Third Vice Chair.

The Board has three standing committees that make recommendations on action items to be considered by the full Board: Planning & Economic Development Committee Project Prioritization Committee Freight Initiatives Committee

In addition, there is a Regional Transportation Advisory Committee composed of planners and engineers from the subregions that meets to review regional issues and act as advisers to the Board.

== Long Range Plan ==
NJTPA planning activities are guided by its long range plan, which is updated every four years. The NJTPA Long Range Transportation Plan analyzes all aspects of transportation in northern and central New Jersey and sets an investment blueprint for the next 25 years. The Board of Trustees adopted the current plan, Connecting Communities: The NJTPA Long Range Transportation Plan, in September 2025. The plan incorporates emphasis areas established by the federal government, state government transportation and land use policy, and local government transportation goals.

This plan includes a new vision statement: Connecting Communities: The NJTPA Long Range Transportation Plan envisions a resilient, modern multimodal system that meets aims to transport people and goods to their destinations safely, easily, and reliably. The NJTPA will strive to ensure the transportation system supports the regional economy, and improves the environment, health and quality of life for all residents.

While mobility is a primary concern, Connecting Communities also considers how transportation investments can promote broader regional objectives tied to seven overarching goals.

== Street Smart NJ ==
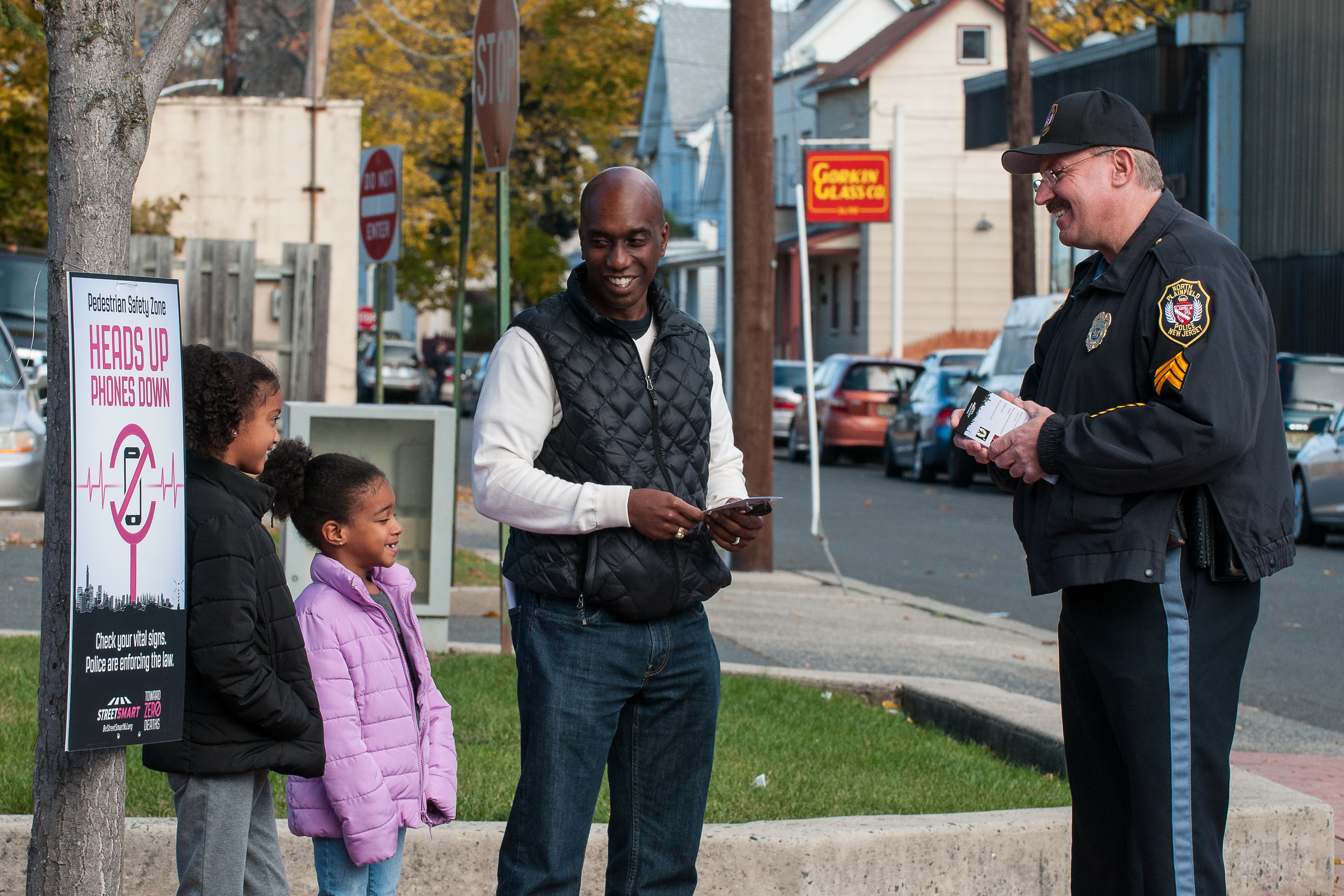
Street Smart NJ is a statewide pedestrian safety campaign coordinated by the NJTPA.

Street Smart NJ is a public education campaign coordinated by the North Jersey Transportation Planning Authority that aims to raise awareness of pedestrian and motorist laws and change the behaviors that lead to pedestrian and cyclist crashes and fatalities.

Street Smart NJ emphasizes educating drivers, pedestrians and bicyclists through mass media, as well as targeted enforcement. Since its inception in 2013, more than 300 partner agencies and communities have participated in Street Smart NJ in some way. The campaign uses outdoor, transit and online advertising, along with grassroots public awareness efforts and law enforcement to address pedestrian safety.

Evaluations of previous Street Smart NJ campaigns have shown positive results. There was a 28 percent reduction in pedestrians jaywalking or crossing against the signal and a 40 percent reduction in drivers failing to yield to crossing pedestrians or cyclists following campaigns the NJTPA managed in March 2016.

== See also ==
- Metropolitan planning organizations of New Jersey
- New York Metropolitan Transportation Council
- Regional Plan Association
