= Mid-Ohio Regional Planning Commission =

Planning organization for Central Ohio

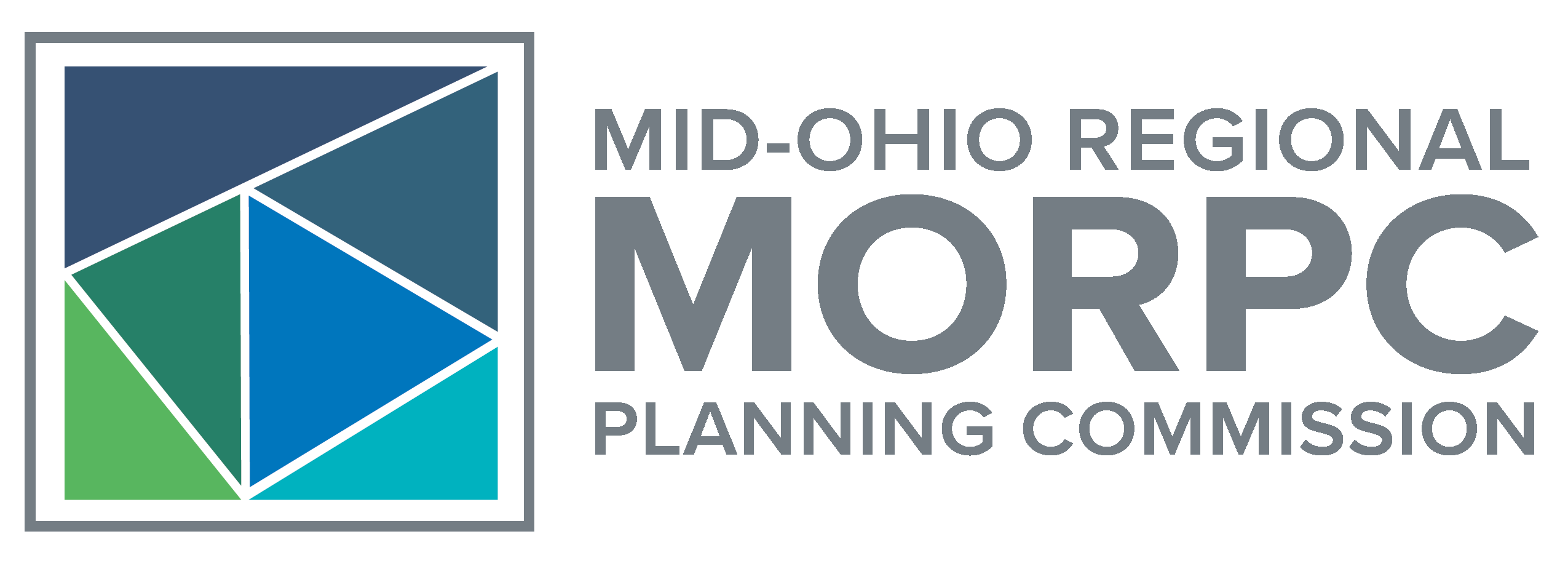

Agency overview
- Jurisdiction: Central Ohio
- Headquarters: 111 Liberty St. Unit 100, Columbus, Ohio; 39.95095°N 83.00186°W
- Agency executive: William Murdock, Executive Director
- Website: Official website

The Mid-Ohio Regional Planning Commission (MORPC) is the metropolitan planning organization for Central Ohio, including the state capital, Columbus.

MORPC is a regional council of governments based in Central Ohio that brings together local communities, governments, and partners to address issues that cross city and county lines. MORPC focuses on things like transportation, sustainability, housing, economic development, and regional policy.

== History ==
MORPC was founded in 1943, as the Franklin County Planning Commission to address issues related to growth in the region. It gradually grew to encompass multiple counties. The organization became the Mid-Ohio Regional Planning Commission (MORPC) in 1969. Its program areas include transportation, water, housing and community development, and zoning.

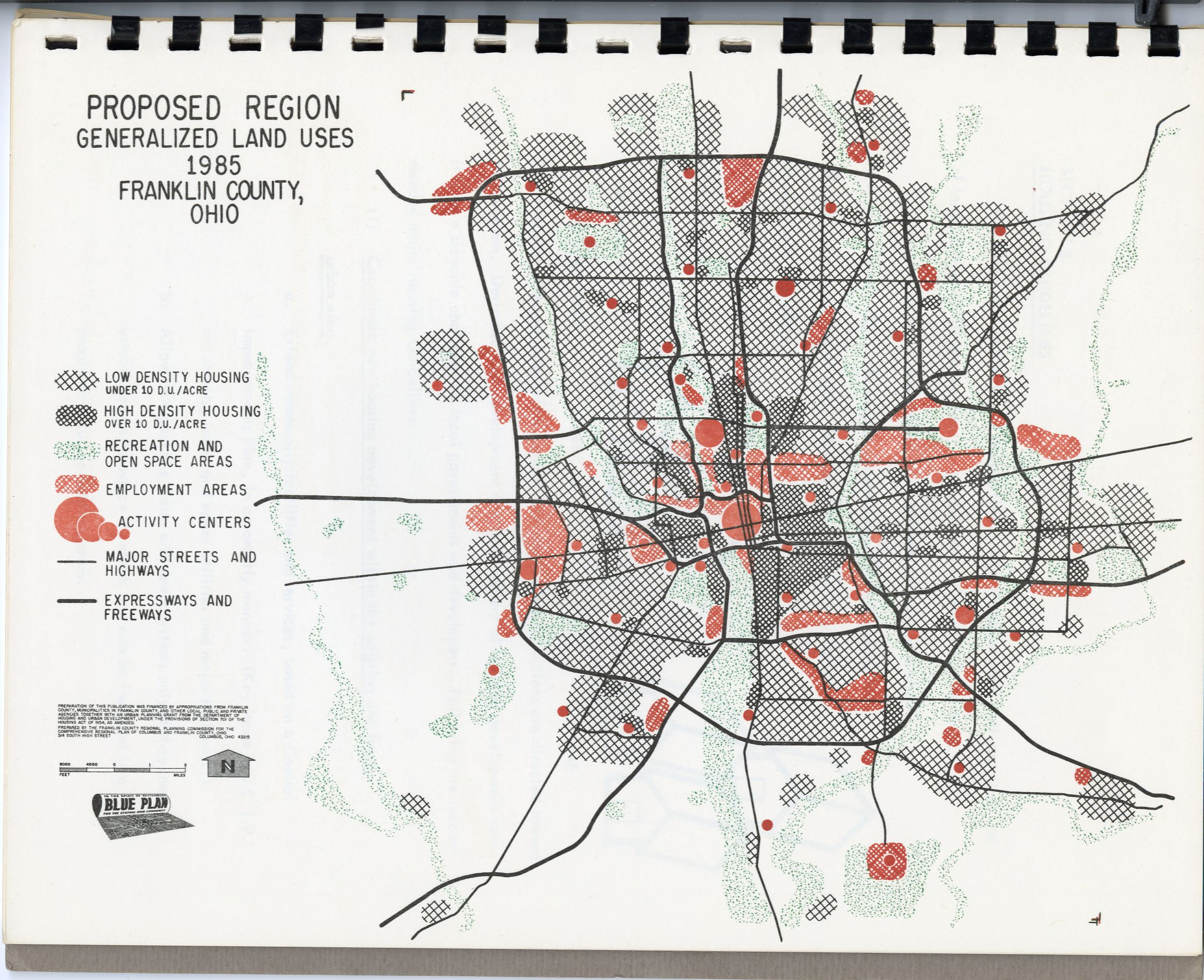
Proposed region - 1985 - Franklin County, Ohio

The organization was headquartered in Downtown Columbus until 2007, when it moved into the city's nearby Brewery District.

== See also ==
- LinkUS
- List of metropolitan planning organizations in the United States
