= Transportation improvement program =

A transportation improvement program (TIP) is a United States federally mandated requirement (49 U.S.C. § 5303 (j)) for all metropolitan planning organizations (MPOs). The TIP, also known as a short-range plan, lists all transportation projects in an MPO's metropolitan planning area that seek federal transportation funding within at least a four-year horizon.

The TIP is complementary to the long-range transportation plan (LRTP), or regional transportation plan (RTP), that plans on a twenty or thirty year horizon.

== Development of the TIP ==
MPOs must consider the following when developing a TIP:

1. The MPO should involve its member governments, the State, and local public transit operators.
2. The TIP should contain transportation projects consistent with the RTP.
3. Investment priorities from the RTP should be reflected in the TIP.
4. The public should be given an opportunity to comment on the TIP and modifications made to the TIP.
5. Reasonable funding estimates should accompany projects included in the TIP.
6. The TIP must be approved not only by the MPO but also the Governor.

== Relationship to Statewide Planning ==
The TIPs of various MPOs within a state feed directly into the state transportation improvement program (STIP). Also a federal requirement (23 U.S.C. § 135 (g)), each STIP is approved by the Federal Highway Administration (FHWA) in conjunction with the Federal Transit Administration (FTA).
