= New York Metropolitan Transportation Council =

Metropolitan planning organization

The New York Metropolitan Transportation Council (NYMTC) is the metropolitan planning organization for New York City, Long Island, and the lower Hudson Valley (Putnam, Rockland, and Westchester counties). It is a federally mandated planning forum to allow the ten counties it represents to coordinate the use of federal transportation funds. NYMTC was created in 1982 after the disbanding of the Tri-State Regional Planning Commission, a metropolitan planning organization for the states of New York, New Jersey, and Connecticut. Unlike most other Metropolitan Planning Organizations (MPOs) in the United States, NYMTC's staff are all employees of the New York State Department of Transportation.

Voting members of NYMTC comprise representatives of the counties of Putnam, Rockland, Westchester, Nassau, and Suffolk; the New York City Departments of City Planning and Transportation; the Metropolitan Transportation Authority (MTA) and the New York State Department of Transportation. Unlike some other MPOs, all NYMTC votes must be consensus-based, meaning all the voting members must agree on transportation funding resolutions before they can be approved. Despite the policy and multi-billion dollar budget implications of the votes, there is a noticeable absence of public dissent or even discussion of issues amongst the voting members.

Nonvoting members include representatives of the Federal Highway Administration, Federal Transit Administration, New Jersey Transit, North Jersey Transportation Planning Authority, New York State Department of Environmental Conservation, the Port Authority of New York and New Jersey, and the United States Environmental Protection Agency.

The NYMTC region includes New York City, Long Island and the lower Hudson Valley. It encompasses an area of 2,440 square miles (6,300 km^{2}) and a population of 12.6 million, which was approximately 65% of New York State's population in 2009.

To respond to local needs, NYMTC is divided into three Transportation Coordinating Committees (TCC): New York City TCC, Mid-Hudson South TCC and Nassau/Suffolk TCC. These committees recommend sub-regional transportation priorities and provide opportunities for the private sector, general public, local government and interested stakeholders to become involved in the planning process on a more local level.

== See also ==
- Metropolitan planning organizations of New Jersey
- Regional Plan Association
