= Houston-Galveston Area Council =

- Logo

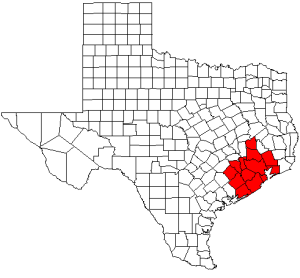
- Map of Texas highlighting counties served by the Houston-Galveston Area Council
- Formation: September 1966
- Type: Voluntary association of governments
- Region served: 12,444 sq mi (32,230 km^{2})
- Members: 13 counties

Historical population
Year	Pop.	±%
2000	4,854,454	—
2010	6,087,133	+25.4%
2020	7,297,022	+19.9%

The Houston-Galveston Area Council (H-GAC) is the region-wide voluntary association of local governments in the 13-county Gulf Coast Planning Region of Texas. The organization works with local government officials to solve problems across the area. H-GAC was founded in 1966.

== The organization ==
Based in Houston, the Houston-Galveston Area Council is a member of the Texas Association of Regional Councils. Its service area is 12,500 square miles and contains more than 6 million people in Southeast Texas. H-GAC is the regional organization through which local governments consider issues and cooperate in solving area-wide problems. Through H-GAC, local governments also initiate efforts in anticipating and preventing problems.

H-GAC provides planning programs in most areas of shared governmental concern. All H-GAC programs are carried out under the policy direction of H-GAC’s local elected official Board of Directors. H-GAC is made up of the region's local governments and their elected officials. The organization works with public and private sector organizations and a host of volunteers.

=== Metropolitan Planning Organization ===
In 1974, the Governor of Texas designated a metropolitan planning organization (MPO) that includes eight H-GAC counties: Brazoria, Chambers, Fort Bend, Galveston, Harris, Liberty, Montgomery, and Waller. The H-GAC Board of Directors serves as the fiscal agent for the H-GAC MPO. The MPO's Policy Board is the Transportation Policy Council (TPC), an independent policy making body. The TPC's responsibilities include: adopting the Regional Transportation Plan; selecting all federally funded and most state-funded transportation projects (all projects with "regional significance"); conducting a continuing, comprehensive, collaborative planning process; and demonstrating that selected projects will not hinder regional progress towards emissions reduction.

== Counties served ==
- Austin
- Brazoria
- Chambers
- Colorado
- Fort Bend
- Galveston
- Harris
- Liberty
- Matagorda
- Montgomery
- Walker
- Waller
- Wharton

== Largest cities in the region ==
- Houston
- Pasadena
- Sugar Land
- Baytown
- Missouri City
- Galveston
- League City
- Pearland
- Conroe
- Texas City
- Huntsville
- La Porte
- Friendswood

== See also ==
- Houston-Galveston Area Council 2035 Regional Transportation Plan
