= Houston-Galveston Area Council 2035 Regional Transportation Plan =

The H-GAC 2035 Regional Transportation Plan (H-GAC 2035 RTP) is the long range transportation plan for the Houston-Galveston Area and serves as blueprint for further planning to be undertaken in the region over the next 30 years. The plan which was developed in a joint cooperation with Cities, Counties, Texas Department of Transportation (TxDOT) and METRO. The RTP combines research, plans and programs by various organizations into one comprehensive plan which is updated every four years. The RTP's main aim is to identify long-range transportation needs, prioritize programs and projects and to provide a forum for dialogue and regional problem solving.

The Houston-Galveston Area is one of the fastest growing metropolitan area in the United States, with a projected rise in the region's population by 3 million and the creation of 1.5 million new jobs. It is estimated that this growth will create a demand for 1.7 million new homes in the region. The rapid expansion of the region will lead to a heavy drain on the current infrastructure and adequate planning must be undertaken to ensure safe and attractive communities, good schools and a transportation system that provides easy access for residents across the region.

== Envision Houston Region ==
The RTP began as a public outreach program called Envision Houston Region (EHR). The program was an outreach initiative which brought together hundreds of residents, elected officials, developers and other participants of various workshops.

The outcome of the program was a clear need for jobs closer to homes, more travel options and environmental concerns. The 2035 RTP uses these needs as guiding principles for the development of transportation infrastructure.

== 2035 RTP Goals ==
The Following have been outlined as goals for the 2035 RTP to accomplish:

1. Improve Mobility, Reduce Congestion
2. Improve Access to Jobs, Homes & Services
3. Increase Transit Options
4. Coordinate Transportation and Land Use Plans
5. Create a Healthier Environment

== Meeting RTP Goals ==
=== System Expansion ===
The 2035 RTP plans to expand the current transportation system in order to meet the growing demand. The system will expand selected roads, bus & transit services and bicycle and pedestrian facilities.

==== Roadway System ====
The RTP will add 6,100 new arterials and 1,420 tollway lane miles to the current system. The following are some of the Major projects that will be undertaken:

- SH 99 (Grand Parkway)
  - Construction of toll lanes and interchanges
- US 290
  - Widen Main Lanes
  - Construct Commuter rail between Downtown and SH 99
  - Construct Managed lanes along Hempstead Highway.
- I-45
  - Reconstruct and add Managed Lanes
  - Construct a Light Rail From US 59 to Intercontinental Airport
  - Widen main lanes
  - Construct managed lanes
  - Construct Commuter Rail along SH 3 from Galveston to Downtown
- SH 35
  - Construct Tollway
- US 59 (south)
  - Widen main lanes
- SH 146
  - Widen main lanes
  - Construct managed Lanes
- SH 249
  - Construct toll lanes
- US 90A
  - Construct commuter rail line from I-610 Loop to Rosenberg

==== Transit System ====
The RTP also plans close to $18 billion in capital investments for transit systems across the region. The key projects are:

- Downtown Intermodal Terminal
- 81 miles of Lightrail
- 84 miles of Commuter Rail Transit
- 40 miles of signature Bus Service
- 10 New Transit Facilities

=== Demand Management ===
The 2035 RTP will try to alleviate future pressure on the system by reducing demand on the current infrastructure. Demand management will be an important tool to reduce congestion by encouraging other modes of transport, non-peak travel and alternate routing. The following strategies are recommended in the 2035 plan:

==== Commute Solutions ====
Commute solutions will promote transit, vanpools, carpools, telework and other transport options:

- $7 Million annually for vanpools/carpools
- $500 Million to support teleworking and Transportation Management Organizations

=== Operations Management ===
The 2035 plan will try to maximize the efficiency of the current infrastructure using low-cost techniques such as traffic signal synchronization, incident management and traveler information systems.

==== Smart Streets ====
Smart Streets consist of traffic light synchronization, deployment of medians, construction and extension of turn bays, consolidation of redundant driveways, and placement of appropriate grade separations

==== Intelligent Transport Systems (ITS) ====
Houston's ITS is one of the more advanced ITS systems in the nation. The RTP designates $600 million for Houston TranStar to develop the Houston ITS system further.

==== Safety Program ====
The RTP will allot $347 Million to safety procedures and will:

- Improve at-grade railroad Crossings
- Add shoulders to Highways
- Install Roadway lighting and Signage

==== Security & Evacuation ====
The Regional Evacuation plan will ensure the following in the event of a catastrophic event:

- Designated fuel stops
- State directed fuel resources
- Pre-positioned tow trucks
- Buses at pre-designated locations
- Pre-arranged destinations and lodging

=== Livable Centers ===
The 2035 Plan presents a 3C's approach to development strategy: Centers, Connects and Context. This Strategy encourages transit, pedestrian and bicycle options. The RTP will allot:

- $68 Million for livable centers projects between 2008 and 2011
- $20 million for additional support for long-range livable centers projects
- $274 million in bicycle and pedestrian improvements

=== Protecting the Environment ===
Participants for Envision Houston Region showed an overwhelming concern for the environment and protection of greenspaces and natural resources. The 2035 RTP not only identifies sensitive environmental areas such as wetlands, prairies, forests and bayous but also takes initiative to cut vehicle emissions.

- Clean Air Action - $1 million annually for vehicle emission reduction programs
- Clean Vehicles/Clean Cities - $460 million to replace aging diesel engines and support clean technologies

== Funding ==
The 2035 RTP is estimated to cost about $128 billion and will be financed from a combination of Federal, State and Local sources. It is projected that approximately 73% of total revenue will be generated from local sources with less than 20% coming from Federal sources. Tollway revenues are expected to make up to 17% of the total RTP revenues.

The RTP will spend $66 billion (51%) on maintenance, rehabilitation and operations of the region's infrastructure. $47 billion (36%) will be used to expand highways, transit and local routes in the Houston-Galveston Area.

The RTP program is facing a 70 billion dollar short fall as projected by TxDOT. This means that the projected 2035 plan will have to be amended unless revenue can be generated to pay for the shortfall. Fee increases, consumption tax increases and a proposed mileage tax for the greater Houston/Galveston area are being looked at to shore up the gap. At the time of this writing government officials were surveying and accepting public comment to gauge public response to the revenue plan.

== See also ==
- Regional Transportation Plan
- Houston-Galveston Area Council
- Metropolitan Transit Authority of Harris County, Texas
- Texas Department of Transportation
