= Lexington Area MPO =

The Lexington Area Metropolitan Planning Organization (MPO) has been involved with transportation planning in Lexington, Kentucky, USA, and its immediate area since being established in 1974. It is responsible, in cooperation with the Kentucky Transportation Cabinet, for planning and coordinating all aspects of transportation planning on behalf of local governments within its region, which includes the Lexington-Fayette Urban County Government (the consolidated government of Lexington and Fayette County) and Jessamine County.

== Organizational framework ==
The MPO was formed in 1974 when the committee structure was established by a letter from Mayor H. Foster Pettit to the Kentucky Secretary of Transportation, Calvin Grayson. The Transportation Policy Committee (TPC) is the decision-making body of the Lexington Area MPO and is composed of the mayors of Lexington, Nicholasville, and Wilmore; the Fayette and Jessamine County Judge-Executives; the Vice Mayor of Lexington; six members of the Lexington-Fayette Urban County Council; the Chairman of LexTran; President of Federated Transportation Services of the Bluegrass (FTSB) and the Secretary for the Kentucky Transportation Cabinet (KYTC).

The TPC has several subcommittees that report to it: Transportation Technical Coordinating Committee (TTCC), Congestion Management Committee (CMC), Bicycle & Pedestrian Advisory Committee (BPAC), Air Quality Advisory Committee (AQAC), and Traffic Safety Coalition (TSC).

== Plans and documents ==
The Lexington Area MPO, as part of its mandate, produces many plans and documents. The Metropolitan Transportation Plan (MTP) is required by federal and state laws, and is the primary plan for the future transportation system of the region. It is updated every 3–5 years. The Transportation improvement program (TIP) is updated more frequently and is more project-oriented. The MPO must also develop a Unified Planning Work Program (UPWP) which identifies where all of the money flowing into the MPO goes, including staffing and other administrative costs. The MPO also has a Participation Plan (PP), and develops many other plans and documents as directed by federal and state governmental bodies.

== Work programs ==
There are several different areas within the MPO and planners that specialize in at least one area, although some cover multiple areas.

=== Air quality ===
The MPO monitors the air quality and level of ozone in the area.

=== Public transit ===
The MPO is responsible for funding public transportation projects.

=== Local roads ===
The MPO has funded certain local roads projects including projects to widen roads.

=== Bluegrass Mobility Office ===
The Lexington Bluegrass Mobility Office was established in 1997 by the LFUCG as the central point of contact in all inquiries concerning mobility (transportation) issues.

=== Bicycle and pedestrian ===
The MPO funds the construction and maintenance of walking paths and bicycle trails.
