= Regional Plan Association =

Think tank in the US

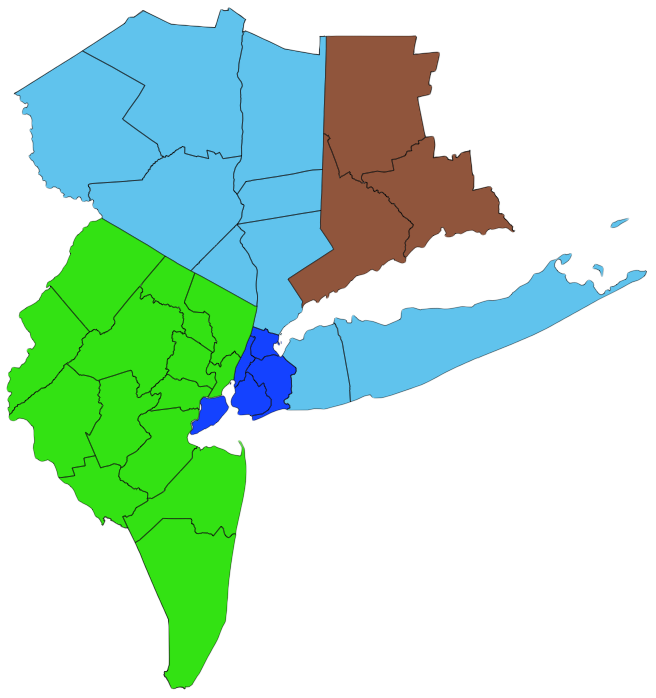
- 31-county area
- Abbreviation: RPA
- Formation: 1922
- Type: Non-Profit
- Purpose: Regional planning
- Headquarters: Manhattan, New York, New York
- Region served: New York metropolitan area USA
- President: Thomas K Wright
- Staff: 30
- Website: rpa.org

The Regional Plan Association is an independent, not-for-profit regional planning organization, founded in 1922, that focuses on recommendations to improve the quality of life and economic competitiveness of a 31-county New York–New Jersey–Connecticut region in the New York metropolitan area. Headquartered in New York City, it has offices in Princeton, New Jersey, and Stamford, Connecticut.

== History ==
In 1922, the Russell Sage Foundation appointed the Committee on the Plan of New York and its Environs with the goal of creating a comprehensive development plan with to enhance quality of life for residents. The first Committee meeting was held on May 10, 1922, including prominent attendees such as Herbert Hoover, Charles Dyer Norton, Elihu Root, Lillian Wald, Charles Dana Gibson, and Eleanor Robson Belmont. Between 1927 and 1929, a series of ten technical volumes on manufacturing, transportation, and community planning was published as precursors to the first Regional Plan. In 1929, the RPA was formally incorporated. That same year, the first Regional Plan was published, the first regional plan in the United States.

=== First Regional Plan ===
In 1930, George McAneny became RPA's first president. The first plan included ambitious proposals such as building a new city upon the New Jersey Meadowlands that would fit five million people at the cost of $125 million. In 1931, Volume II of the First Plan was introduced, which focused on urban design. This plan included plans such as demolishing blighted areas on the Lower East Side.

Expansion of public parks was another important factor in the first plan, as it identified several natural areas to be acquired for public use. This included the establishment and expansion of sites including Garret Mountain Reservation in Paterson, NJ, Great Kills Park on Staten Island, and the Palisades Interstate Park System.

In the late 1930s, the RPA successfully prevented Robert Moses's proposal to build a bridge between Battery Park and Brooklyn, resulting in the Brooklyn-Battery Tunnel being built instead. Throughout the 1930s and 1940s, the region's highway and parkway network largely followed the RPA's plan, including projects such as the George Washington Bridge, the Belt Parkway, the Henry Hudson Parkway, and East River Drive (now FDR Drive). Since the 1930s, the RPA recommended a highway between the Triborough Bridge and Gowanus Parkway, which later became the Brooklyn-Queens Expressway when it was completed in 1964.

In 1942, a study was conducted by the RPA about traffic and parking in Manhattan below 61st Street, where they planned to build parking structures near transit, as well as advocating for a form of congestion pricing.

During World War II, the RPA worked to address housing, transportation, and civilian protection efforts, particularly due to the convergence of workers in defense industries. Following World War II, population growth exploded in the suburbs, as opposed to New York City and other urban areas as it had been decades prior. The suburban population doubled, and the newly built road network encouraged sprawl. The RPA advocated for the development of land near to transit and to Manhattan. RPA advocated for comprehensive community planning, improved building codes, and large-scale development of regional city centers. In 1947, the RPA released a report called Airports of Tomorrow, which called for improvements to the region's airport system.

In the late 1940s, the RPA advocated for the "neighborhood unit", which promoted design principles for neighborhoods, including garden apartments, walkable shopping centers, and minimal through-traffic. These ideas were implemented in places such as Fresh Meadows and Forest Hill Gardens in Queens, and Radburn, New Jersey.

In 1950, the Port Authority of New York and New Jersey opened the Port Authority Bus Terminal in response to a growing need to handle suburban bus traffic.

In the 1950s, some board members of the RPA considered the dissolution of the organization, claiming that the goals of the First Plan had largely been completed with the construction of the Verrazano–Narrows Bridge. Instead, the RPA was tasked with analyzing the impact and alternatives to suburban sprawl, particularly the rapid rise in lot size requirements and scattering of nonresidential development.

In 1960, the RPA's "The Race for Open Space" study led to the creation of various parks, including Delaware Valley, Island Beach State Park, Lake Wawayanda, Round Valley, and Sandy Hook in New Jersey; Fire Island, Lloyd Neck, Moriches Inlet, and the Shawangunks in New York; as well as the Taconic Tri State Park in New York, Connecticut, and Massachusetts, three of which became national parks. RPA’s study was cited in the introduction of the first federal aid for open space.

In 1961, the RPA's Commuter Report concluded that public transportation was essential to the region, and called for federal aid for public transportation and railroad investment. As a result, the three State Highway Departments all became Departments of Transportation, which sought to modernize buses and rail. In 1964, as the private railroad operators were approaching bankruptcy, the RPA advocated for one regional public transportation agency in charge of operating the private railroads, although multiple agencies were created instead. The Urban Mass Transportation Act of 1964 was passed in response. This led to the creation of the Metropolitan Transportation Authority (MTA) in 1965.

In 1962, the RPA began working on the Second Regional Plan, as the 1929 First Plan was outdated. Over the 1960s, they conducted public meetings and surveys to figure out public desires for regional planning.

=== Second Regional Plan ===
The Second Regional Plan was released in 1968, which called for more federal investment in public services for low-income communities and communities of color, more compact development to reduce suburban sprawl, minimize auto travel, and protect open space.

In the 1960s, the RPA supported Robert Moses's idea of building the Lower Manhattan Expressway, although they disagreed with Moses on how it should be constructed. The idea died after Moses's removal of his post in 1966. They advocated against the construction of a fourth major airport in the region, instead seeking ways to minimize air travel growth and improving runway capacity.

The second plan included recommendations for developing regional city centers outside of Manhattan. This was implemented in cities and areas such as Jamaica, Queens, Paterson, New Brunswick, Bridgeport, and Stamford. In 1983, the released a study regarding Downtown Brooklyn development, which led to the creation of projects such as the MetroTech Center. In the 1980s, released development plans for several counties until 2000, including Fairfield, Morris, Westchester, and the Bronx. Also in the 1980s, the RPA argued for the waterfront of New Jersey in Hudson County opposite Manhattan, which was largely undeveloped or industrial, to become a continuous waterfront catering to pedestrians, cyclists, boaters and transit riders with the development of a light rail system. This eventually did lead to development along the waterfront, the creation of the Hudson River Waterfront Walkway, the build out of the Hudson-Bergen Light Rail and restoration of cross-Hudson ferry service.

In 1968, the nation's first national park in an area was created, Gateway National Recreation Area. They also helped preserve the final stretch of undeveloped oceanfront in NYC, Breezy Point. In 1972, the RPA advocated for the protection of Paterson Great Falls, which later became a National Park in 2011. The RPA's desire to protect the Meadowlands from continuing to be used as a dumping ground led to the creation of the Hackensack Meadowlands Development Commission (now New Jersey Meadowlands Commission). In 1992, the RPA reviewed brownfields in New Jersey that could be revitalized for development. In 1995, the RPA spearheaded the effort to transform Governor's Island from an abandoned Coast Guard base to an urban park.

CHOICES for ’76 was an Emmy award-winning series of televised town hall meetings. RPA created several one-hour documentaries which asked viewers to weigh in on planning decisions about housing, transportation, the environment, poverty, and cities and suburbs. The town halls were featured on every major news network in the region.

In 1973, the RPA published a study demonstrating the link between higher urban density and lower per capita energy consumption during the oil crisis.

The RPA continued to be an advocate against cars and in favor of multimodal transportation approaches during the 1970s. The agency successfully fought against the addition of new lanes to the Lincoln Tunnel and a new tube in the Queens-Midtown Tunnel. The RPA advocated for extending bus networks, more free and discounted transit programs, and creating more transit in transit deserts. They also published a report advocating for pedestrian needs, including wider sidewalks, closing selected streets to vehicles, and pedestrian-friendly building design.

In 1978, Jimmy Carter created the first National Urban Policy, which replicated much of the RPA's policies.

In 1979, New Jersey Transit was formed at the support of the RPA, which operated the state's bus and rail systems.

=== Third Regional Plan ===
In 1996, the Third Regional Plan was published, which called for a seamless mass transit system, a network of protected natural resources, and maintaining half the region's employment in urban centers. The plan also considered the fact that continued economic growth was not guaranteed following an economic downturn in the early 1990s.

In 1999, the RPA was tasked by CSX Transportation with how to reuse the High Line, which was eventually decided on being a recreational trail, later implemented during the 2000s-2010s. In 2004, the vision for Manhattan's Far West Side was included in the third plan, which sought to include a mixed-use development, later becoming Hudson Yards, which began construction in 2012. In 2007, the RPA advocated for the conversion of the James A. Farley Post Office into a transportation hub, which was later completed in 2021 as Moynihan Train Hall. In 2009, Times Square was pedestrianized, something that had been in the RPA's Second Plan, as well as numerous other pedestrian-oriented improvements in the city.

In 1999, the RPA proposed a regional express rail in the region, which outlined new rail lines, which put together abandoned right-of-ways and new construction. This included the Second Avenue subway expansion into Brooklyn, a new cross-Hudson subway, East Side access to Grand Central by Long Island Railroad, and a Brooklyn-Queens-Bronx Triboro subway line. In 2000, the Hudson-Bergen Light Rail was constructed in Hudson County, New Jersey, a plan that had dated back to the 1960s. In 2002, the RPA advocated for a third track for the Long Island Rail Road, which was eventually completed in 2022. In 2002, an idea dating back to the First Plan was constructed, which was to connect two rail lines in Montclair to consolidate rail service in Essex County. In 2010, the Transit for Connecticut coalition commissioned an RPA study on transit in the state, which argued for New Haven-Hartford-Springfield high speed rail corridor and Hartford-New Britain busway funding, as well as the development of transit-oriented and walkable downtowns. In 2010, the RPA supported the Access to the Region's Core (ARC) project, which would have increased rail capacity under the Hudson River. The project was blocked by New Jersey Governor Chris Christie in 2010, but was eventually replaced with the Gateway Program. In the 2010s, the RPA provided guidelines for the MTA to improve their transit signaling system, which was nearly a century old. In 2016, the RPA prevented the L train tunnel under the East River from being closed for repairs due to Hurricane Sandy, where it was agreed to reduce service at off-peak hours to conduct repairs.

In 2003, the Mayor's Institute on Design began as a program to promote better development, and was in participation with several organizations such as the U.S. Conference of Mayors, the New Jersey League of Municipalities, the American Architectural Foundation, the Rauch Foundation, and the National Endowment for the Arts. In 2006, the RPA helped Newark craft a long term Draft Vision Plan for economic development, housing, environmental, and transportation improvements in the city. Starting in 2014 in Suffolk County, the RPA helped plan out transit-oriented developments and walkable neighborhoods in Amityville, West Babylon, and the Hauppauge Industrial Park. In 2016, a report was released on how to protect affordable housing in East Harlem.

In 2004, the New Jersey Highlands Water Protection and Planning Act and the federal Highlands Conservation Act led to the preservation of nearly a million acres of environmentally sensitive land and protected a source of clean drinking water for more than 5 million New Jersey residents. RPA supported both pieces of legislation, and later released reports on conservation and sustainable development in the Highlands. In 2005, the RPA helped establish the Central Pine Barren Commission in Long Island. This led to the creation of Jamesport State Park (now Hallock State Park Preserve) and Long Island Sound public access improvements. In 2012, the RPA successfully advocated for the creation of the Brooklyn Waterfront Greenway. In 2013, the RPA, along with the National Park Service, helped improve access to the Jamaica Bay Greenway and waterfront. In 2017, the RPA proposed an integrated network of 1,650 miles of biking, hiking, and walking trails.

Transportation funding was a major concern in this plan. The RPA released reports in 2004 analyzing the MTA's 2005-2009 capital program, where it warned the MTA that it was heading for a financial downward spiral. Also in the early 2000s, transportation funding was deemed to be New Jersey's biggest financial problem. It warned NJ Transit that it would run out of money by 2006, and that it threatened decades of transit growth in the state. Instead, NJ Transit continued down a path of decline due to fiscal and management crises. Additionally, the RPA was focused on the increasingly unsustainable cost of construction in New York City. It also noted the high expense of Long Island due to its lack of rental units.

In 2008, the RPA formed the Northeast Alliance for Rail and America 2050 program to provide leadership in the Northeast and across the U.S. on a broad range of transportation and economic development issues. The organization helped to secure the passage of the Passenger Rail Investment and Improvement Act of 2008, which helped provide much funding to the Northeast Corridor Amtrak line and led to the creation of the Federal Railroad Administration’s High-Speed Intercity Passenger Rail Program. America 2050 was a nationwide planning initiative that focused on what the RPA established as the 11 megaregions of the United States.

In 2012, following Hurricane Sandy, the RPA launched scenario plans for the rebuilding of the region, which included a framework on how to reconstruct damaged and destroyed property for future community resilience. A 2016 report called "Under Water" identified areas in the region at most risk for being permanently flooded by sea level rise. They developed major resilience policies as a result.

Leading up to the creation of the Fourth Regional Plan in 2017, the RPA launched its Four Corridors (4/C) initiative, which reclassified the region as four corridors - the Highlands, the Suburbs, the City, and the Coast, which laid out development plans for each corridor.

=== Fourth Regional Plan ===
In 2017, the Fourth Regional Plan was created, which sought to address various issues including housing affordability, overburdened transit infrastructure, and climate change vulnerabilities. The plan had four core values: equity, health, prosperity, and sustainability. Regarding equity, the plan sought to make land use decisions more inclusively; reduce inequality by expanding access to economic opportunity; invest in transportation and lower costs for those with the least ability to pay; and create sustainability through community outreach.

In 2018, the RPA advocated for the Meadowlands to become a climate resilience park due to the encroaching threat of sea level rise. Recommendations included acquiring all privately held wetlands and utilizing any publicly owned land. In 2022, the RPA released a reported outlining how New York and New Jersey can make more resilience efforts against hurricanes. New Jersey also adopted the Inland Flood Protection Rule, making it the first state to use predictive precipitation modeling to implement rules to inform and protect future development and redevelopment from the impacts of climate change.

In 2018, the RPA launched the Public for Penn coalition, which advocated for major infrastructure improvements at Penn Station.

In 2019, the RPA helped publish a comprehensive development plan for Bridgeport. In 2022, the RPA commissioned a vision plan for a redevelopment of Rikers Island into a green energy hub. In 2023, the RPA released a report on how to incorporate offshore wind turbines in New Jersey.

In 2019, the RPA began to advocate for congestion pricing in New York, which had the goal of reducing congestion, improving public transit, and improving public health. The RPA created a plan for congestion pricing shortly after the bill was passed.

In 2018, the RPA launched the Build Gateway Now coalition, which advocated for the Gateway Program. Since the Third Plan, the RPA had advocated for the creation of a rail line connecting Brooklyn, Queens, and the Bronx, where in 2020 they successfully advocated for a feasibility study.

In 2020, the RPA was tasked with dealing with planning the recovery efforts of the COVID-19 pandemic. This included transit and bikeway improvements for workers, developing more affordable housing options, and countering misinformation.

The RPA has been an advocate for Open Streets since 2021.

In 2021, the RPA worked with DesegregateCT to push for major zoning and land use reform bills in Connecticut, which later became an official part of the RPA's platform in February 2022.

== Regional plans ==
RPA has produced four strategic regional plans for the New York metropolitan region since the 1920s. The chronology of their plans is as follows:

1. The First Plan in 1929, developed under the leadership of Thomas Adams, provided a guide for the area's road and transportation network.
2. The Second Plan in 1968, published as a series of reports in the 1960s, aimed at restructuring mass transit and reinvigorating deteriorating urban centers.
3. The Third Plan in 1996, "A Region at Risk," recommended improving regional mass transit, increasing protection of open space and maintaining employment in traditional urban centers.
4. The Fourth Plan in 2017 suggested improving the area's transportation network, making more affordable housing, implementing measures to fight climate change, and restructure the area's public institutions.

== Planning philosophy ==
The RPA program represents a philosophy of planning described by historian Robert Fishman as "metropolitanism," associated with the Chicago School of Sociology. It promotes large scale, industrial centers and the concentration of population rather than decentralized development.

== Impact in the Tri-state area ==
Regional Plan Association's strategic plans have proposed numerous ideas and investments for the New York metropolitan area that have turned into major public works, economic development and open space projects, including:

- The location of the George Washington Bridge.
- The preservation of the Palisades and the construction of the Palisades Interstate Parkway.
- The redevelopment of Governors Island, through the RPA-led coalition Governors Island Alliance.
- The establishment of urban national parks like the Gateway National Recreation Area in Jamaica Bay.
- The creation of the Hudson-Bergen Light Rail system in Hudson County, New Jersey
- The revitalization of the regional centers like Downtown Brooklyn, Newark, and Stamford.

== See also ==
- Metropolitan planning organizations of New Jersey
- New York Metropolitan Transportation Council
- Port Authority of New York and New Jersey
- Megaregions of the United States
