= Regional Transportation Plan =

The Regional Transportation Plan (RTP) in the United States is a long-term blueprint of a region's transportation system. Usually RTPs are conducted every five years and are plans for thirty years into the future, with the participation of dozens of transportation and infrastructure specialists. The plan identifies and analyzes transportation needs of the metropolitan region and creates a framework for project priorities.

These plans are normally the product of recommendations and studies carried out and put forth by a Metropolitan planning organization (MPO). MPOs were formed under the 1962 Federal-Aid Highway Act and are required for any urban area with a population of greater than 50,000.

== Aims and objectives ==
MPOs must consider the following points when planning an RTP:

1. Support the economic vitality of the metropolitan areas, especially by enabling global competitiveness, productivity, and efficiency.
2. Increase the safety of the system for users of all modes of transportation.
3. Raise the ability of the transportation system to support homeland security and to safeguard the security of users of all modes of transportation.
4. Improve accessibility and mobility for people and freight.
5. Enhance the integration and connectivity of the transportation system, between modes, for people and freight.
6. Environmental considerations:
  1. Protect and enhance the environment;
  2. promote energy conservation;
  3. improve the quality of life; and,
  4. promote consistency between transportation projects, and State and local planned growth and economic development patterns.
7. Promote efficient operation and management of the system.
8. Emphasize the preservation of the existing transportation system.

== See also ==
- Houston-Galveston Area Council 2035 Regional Transportation Plan
- Safe, Accountable, Flexible, Efficient Transportation Equity Act: A Legacy for Users
- Los Angeles County Metropolitan Transportation Authority
- Metropolitan Transportation Commission (San Francisco Bay Area)
- Houston-Galveston Area Council
