= Metropolitan planning organization =

Transportation committees

A metropolitan planning organization (MPO) is a federally mandated and federally funded transportation policy-making organization in the United States that is made up of representatives from local government and governmental transportation authorities. They were created to ensure regional cooperation in transportation planning. MPOs were introduced by the Federal-Aid Highway Act of 1962, which required the formation of an MPO for any urbanized area (UZA) with a population greater than 50,000. Federal funding for transportation projects and programs are channeled through this planning process. Congress created MPOs in order to ensure that existing and future expenditures of governmental funds for transportation projects and programs are based on a continuing, cooperative, and comprehensive ("3-C") planning process. Statewide and metropolitan transportation planning processes are governed by federal law. Transparency through public access to participation in the planning process and electronic publication of plans now is required by federal law. As of 2015, there are 408 MPOs in the United States.

Areas outside of metropolitan areas may be served by a Rural Planning Organization (RPO) or a Regional Transportation Planning Organization (RTPO).

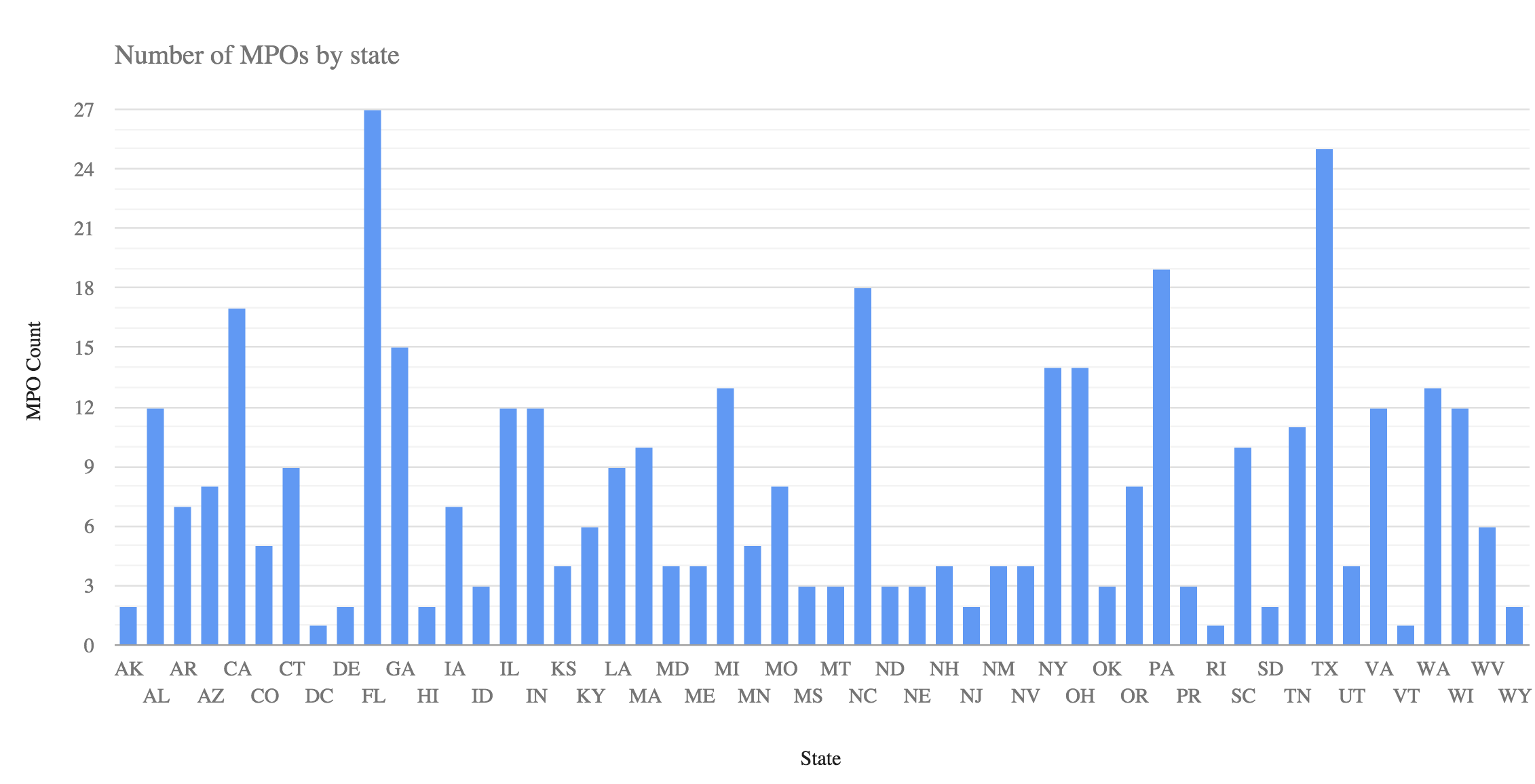
Chart showing the number of metropolitan planning organizations by state as of September 2015.

== Purpose ==
Purposes of MPOs:

- Transportation investment allocates scarce federal and other transportation funding resources;
- Planning needs to reflect the region's shared vision for its future;
- An MPO acts as a Council of Governments; that is, it facilitates collaboration of governments, interested parties, and residents in the planning process.

In other words, the federal government requires that federal transportation funds be allocated to regions in a manner that has a basis in metropolitan plans developed through intergovernmental collaboration, rational analysis, and consensus-based decision making.

== Governance ==
Typically, an MPO governance structure includes a variety of committees as well as a professional staff. The "policy committee" is the top-level decision-making body for the planning organization. In most MPOs, the policy committee comprises:

- elected or appointed officials from local governmental jurisdictions such as municipalities or counties;
- representatives of different transportation modes, such as public transit, freight, bicycle/pedestrian; and
- state agency officials such as, state Department of Transportation, environmental agency, etc.; and
- non-voting members such as FHWA, FTA, FAA, FRA, staff advisers from state departments of transportation, Chambers of Commerce

With only a few unique exceptions nationwide, MPO policy committee members are not elected directly by citizens. Rather, a policy committee member typically is an elected or appointed official of one of the MPO's constituent local jurisdictions. The policy committee member thus has legal authority to speak and act on behalf of that jurisdiction in the MPO setting. Federal law, however, does not require members of an MPO policy committee to be representatives of the metropolitan areas' populations. Systematic studies have found that MPO policy committees' representations of urban municipalities and disadvantaged minority populations in their areas are less than proportional to population. The policy committee's responsibilities include debating and making decisions on key MPO actions and issues, including adoption of the metropolitan long-range transportation plans, transportation improvement programs, annual planning work programs, budgets, and other policy documents. The policy committee also may play an active role in key decision points or milestones associated with MPO plans and studies, as well as conducting public hearings and meetings. An appointed advisory committee (CAC) develops recommendations for consideration by the policy committee and establishes a ranked proposal for work plans.

Most MPOs also establish a technical committee to act as an advisory body to the policy committee for transportation issues that primarily are technical in nature. The technical committee interacts with the MPO's professional staff on technical matters related to planning, analysis tasks, and projects. Through this work, the technical committee develops recommendations on projects and programs for policy committee consideration. Metropolitan travel forecasting is one of the key roles that the technical committee supports. The technical committee typically comprises staff-level officials of local, state, and federal agencies. In addition, a technical committee may include representatives of interest groups, various transportation modes, and local citizens. A 2005 survey of MPOs nationally commissioned in preparation of "Special Report 288" of the Transportation Research Board of the National Academies found that "forecast by negotiation" was a common method of projecting future population and employment growth for use in travel forecasting, suggesting rent-seeking behavior on the part of MPO committees influencing the technical staff.

Usually MPOs retain a core professional staff in order to ensure the ability to carry out the required metropolitan planning process in an effective and expeditious manner. The size and qualifications of this staff may vary by MPO, since no two metropolitan areas have identical planning needs Most MPOs, however, require at least some staff dedicated solely to MPO process oversight and management because of the complexity of the process and need to ensure that requirements are properly addressed.

== Functions ==
=== Core functions ===
There are five core functions of an MPO:

1. establish a setting: establish and manage a fair and impartial setting for effective regional decision-making in the metropolitan planning area (MPA). This planning area is intended to be a future growth planning area extending beyond the urbanized area (UZA)
2. evaluate alternatives: evaluate transportation alternatives, scaled to the size and complexity of the region, to the nature of its transportation issues, and to the realistically available options
3. maintain a regional transportation plan (RTP): develop and update a fiscally constrained long-range transportation plan for the UZA covering a planning horizon of at least twenty years that fosters
  - mobility and access for people and goods,
  - efficient system performance and preservation, and
  - quality of life
4. develop a transportation improvement program (TIP): develop a fiscally constrained program based on the long-range transportation plan and designed to serve the UZA's goals while using spending, regulating, operating, management, and financial tools
5. involve the public: involve the general public and all the significantly affected sub-groups in the four essential functions listed above.

If the metropolitan area is designated as an air quality non-attainment or maintenance area, then

6. protect air quality: transportation plans, programs, and projects must conform with the air quality plan, known as the "state implementation plan" (SIP), for the state within which the UZA lies.

Presently, most MPOs have no authority to raise revenues such as to levy taxes on their own, rather, they are designed to allow local officials to decide collaboratively how to spend available federal and other governmental transportation funds in their urbanized areas. The funding for the operations of an MPO comes from a combination of federal transportation funds and required matching funds from state and local governments.

=== Expanded functions ===
In some regions, MPOs have been given authority to handle expanded functions:

- Managing a regional urban growth boundary
- Distributing a regional housing need allocation to manage growth and ensure affordable housing
- Operating the region's public transportation services

== Structure of MPOs ==
MPOs differ greatly in various parts of the country and even within states. Some have large staffs, while others may include only a director and a transportation planner. Sometimes the professional staff of an MPO is provided by a county or a council of governments. In many urban areas, existing organizations such as county governments or councils of governments also function as MPOs. The MPO role also may be played by an independent governmental organization or a regional government. In the Portland, Oregon, metropolitan area, for example, Metro is the MPO. In the Minneapolis-St. Paul, Minnesota, metropolitan area, the Metropolitan Council is the MPO.

An example of a medium-sized MPO is the Lexington Area MPO in Kentucky. An example of a small MPO is the Kittery Area MPO in Maine.

Another MPO planning organization has developed in the area of western central Florida. Several MPOs there, with governance over eight counties, have developed a greater regional planning committee, the Chairs Coordinating Committee (CCC), composed of the chairs of seven MPOs and the chairs of their appointed advisory committees (or their representatives) in order to coordinate transportation planning for the region, that is compatible with all, as well as addressing the challenges of long range planning for a large and growing region that has overlapping issues among the MPOs or transportation plans that extend throughout the entire area. Often the members of the executive committee of an MPO act interchangeably as the representative to this seven-MPO regional committee. This committee meets less frequently than the participating MPOs.

== Evolving role ==
The enactment of the 1991 Intermodal Surface Transportation Efficiency Act (ISTEA) ushered in a "renaissance" for MPOs. After a decade or more of being consigned to a minimal role in transportation planning, ISTEA directed additional federal funding to MPOs, expanded their authority to select projects, and mandated new metropolitan planning initiatives. For the first time, state transportation officials were required to consult seriously with local representatives on MPO governing boards regarding matters of project prioritization and decision-making. These changes had their roots in the need to address increasingly difficult transportation problems—in particular, the more complicated patterns of traffic congestion that arose with the suburban development boom in the previous decades. Many recognized that the problems could only be addressed effectively through a stronger federal commitment to regional planning.

The legislation that emerged, the Intermodal Surface Transportation Efficiency Act (ISTEA), was signed into federal law by President George H. W. Bush in December 1991. It focused on improving transportation, not as an end in itself, but as the means to achieve important national goals including economic progress, cleaner air, energy conservation, and social equity. ISTEA promoted a transportation system in which different modes and facilities—highway, transit, pedestrian, bicycle, aviation, and marine—were integrated to allow a "seamless" movement of both goods and people. New funding programs provided greater flexibility in the use of funds, particularly regarding using previously restricted highway funds for transit development, improved "intermodal" connections, and emphasized upgrades to existing facilities over building new capacity—particularly roadway capacity.

To accomplish more serious metropolitan planning, ISTEA doubled federal funding for MPO operations and required the agencies to evaluate a variety of multimodal solutions to roadway congestion and other transportation problems. MPOs also were required to broaden public participation in the planning process and to see that investment decisions contributed to meeting the air quality standards of the Clean Air Act Amendments.

In addition, ISTEA placed a new requirement on MPOs to conduct "fiscally constrained planning", and ensure that long-range transportation plans and short-term transportation improvement programs were fiscally constrained; in other words, adopted plans and programs can not include more projects than reasonably can be expected to be funded through existing or projected sources of revenues. This new requirement represented a major conceptual shift for many MPOs (and others in the planning community), since the imposition of fiscal discipline on plans now required, not only understanding how much money might be available, but how to prioritize investment needs and make difficult choices among competing needs. Adding to this complexity is the need to plan across transportation modes and develop approaches for multimodal investment prioritization and decision making. It is in this context of greater prominence, funding, and requirements that MPOs function today.

An annual element is composed of transportation improvement projects contained in an area's transportation improvement program (TIP), which is proposed for implementation during the current year. The annual element is submitted to the U.S. Department of Transportation as part of the required planning process.

The passage of Safe, Accountable, Flexible, Efficient Transportation Equity Act: A Legacy for Users SAFETEA-LU in 2005 created new and revised requirements for transportation planning and programs. Although SAFETEA-LU increased standards, most MPOs already were in compliance with the regulations. Some of the planning topic areas include transportation systems security, emergency preparedness, public participation plans for metropolitan planning, and requiring the electronic publication of plans and TIP/STIP by the MPOs.

SAFETEA-LU requires that the statewide transportation planning process and the metropolitan planning process provide for consideration of projects and strategies that will protect and enhance the environment, promote energy conservation, improve the quality of life, and promote consistency between transportation improvements and state and local planned growth and economic development patterns.

== List of metropolitan planning organizations in the United States ==
There are a large number of metropolitan planning organizations in the United States.

== See also ==
- Conurbation
- Land-use planning
- Regional planning
- Zoning
