= Metropolitan Council (Minnesota) =

Regional government agency

Agency overview
- Formed: 1967
- Type: Regional government and Metropolitan planning organization
- Jurisdiction: Twin Cities
- Agency executive: Deb Barber, Chair
- Website: www.metrocouncil.org

Map
- Counties of the Metropolitan Council

The Metropolitan Council, commonly abbreviated Met Council or Metro Council, is the regional governmental agency and metropolitan planning organization in Minnesota serving the Twin Cities seven-county metropolitan area, accounting for over 55 percent of the state's population.

The Met Council is granted regional authority powers in state statutes by the Minnesota Legislature. These powers are unique in that unlike the Regional Development Commissions they can supersede decisions and actions of local governments. The legislature created the Metro Council to maintain public services, oversee growth of the state's largest metro area and to act as the regional planning organization. Like the Metro in Portland, Oregon, it also administers an urban growth boundary.

The Council's role in the Twin Cities metro area is defined by the necessary regional services it provides and manages. These include public transportation, sewage treatment, regional planning, urban planning for municipalities, forecasting population growth, ensuring adequate affordable housing, maintaining a regional park and trails system, and "provides a framework for regional systems including aviation, transportation, parks and open space, water quality and water management."

The Council has survived multiple reform attempts after being accused of mismanagement and lack of accountability, notably over the construction of the Metro Green Line Extension, though state lawmakers continue to develop plans to remake the Council.

== Governance and structure ==
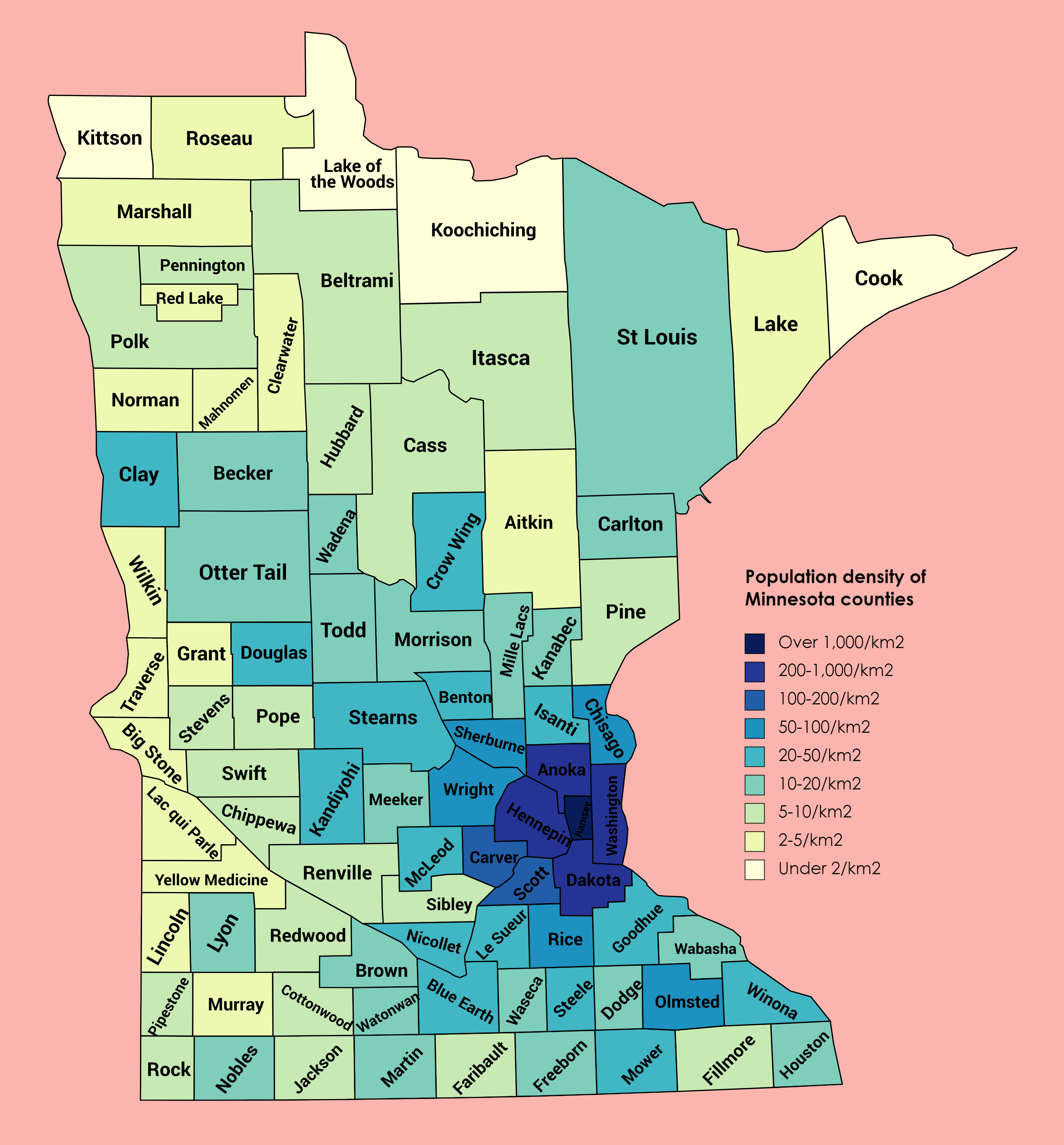
The counties of the Metropolitan Council are the seven most densely populated in the state

The Met Council has 17 members, 16 of whom represent a geographic district in the seven-county area with one chair who serves at large. All members are appointed by the Governor of Minnesota and are reappointed with each new governor in office. The Minnesota Senate may confirm or reject each appointment.

The seven counties in the Council's Twin Cities Metropolitan Area are Anoka, Carver, Dakota, Hennepin, Ramsey, Scott, and Washington counties.

Geographic districts vary in characteristics but were historically drawn by population percentage and the presence of major natural resources. Districts near the downtown core are much smaller while the edge districts encompass large amounts of rural land. For example, District 3 contains almost all of Lake Minnetonka and its tributaries and watershed.

The Met Council employs about 4,300 people, and their wage data are publicly accessible.

== Duties ==
=== General duties ===
The Council delivers regional services to communities and the public through these divisions and operating areas:

- Regional Administration/Chair's Office – Generally sets the goals and direction the Council will take with the metro area. It also manages finances and makes budget decisions on how shared funding and grant programs are distributed amongst the region.
- Community Development – The majority of land use, regional, urban, and community planning occur with this division. It also develops and administers regional and municipal frameworks as well as the long-range vision plans. This division includes the housing authority through which the Council provides housing for people in Anoka and Carver counties and the suburban portions of Hennepin and Ramsey counties. The Council is also responsible for overseeing the development of regional parks and trails.
- Transportation – Two divisions support transportation. The largest is Metro Transit, the authority that provides most bus service and operates light rail and commuter rail lines. The second is Metropolitan Transportation Services (MTS), which includes the staff that support the Council's role as the Metropolitan Planning Organization for the region as well as an operations department that supports Metro Mobility (paratransit service for the region for people who can't use fixed route transit) and contracted services. It also analyzes and develops future transportation options. However, road and street corridor planning is left to county and city governments. The metropolitan highway system is planned in coordination with the Minnesota Department of Transportation. Additional public transit agencies also exist under an agreement in state law that allows them to "opt-out" of Metro Transit service. The largest agencies are Southwest Metro Transit in the west and Minnesota Valley Transportation Authority in the south.
- Environmental Services – MCES is mandated to address water quality, water supply, and sewage treatment. It also has full jurisdiction of the wastewater treatment system (within the MUSA boundary). This includes maintenance and construction of wastewater interceptors and operation of seven wastewater treatment plants throughout the metro area. Treatment of drinking water and storm run-off water management are left to municipalities. Water rates for the metro area are about 40% lower than other rates nationwide due to the effectiveness of this system.
- Municipal Urban Service Area (MUSA) – While not a division, the MUSA is an urban growth boundary which instead of limiting development, limits the services and infrastructure needed for development. Its most important service is the sewage treatment system. Growth is controlled because state law prohibits septic tank systems, and most cities require development to be connected to a system.

=== Tax sharing ===
The council's most distinctive authority is its ability to tax and share the tax revenue between municipalities through the Minnesota Fiscal Disparities Program. This program, first implemented in 1975, made the Twin Cities region the first region to attempt tax-base sharing in the country. The funds are then largely redistributed back to the localities with lower than average market value of property per capita.

== History ==
In 1967 the Minnesota Legislature created the Metropolitan Council in response to growing issues of septic tank wastewater contamination. At the time, the region consisted of "172 cities, 97 townships, and 76 school districts". The region also faced issues with a deteriorating privately owned bus system.

Additional acts of the legislature passed in 1974, 1976, and 1994 expanded the role and powers of the Met Council, merging it with transit and waste control commissions to become a unified regional authority. The Met Council also gained the authority to approve or disapprove of municipal development plans and to manage the region's affordable housing programs.

Current efforts are ongoing to transfer responsibility of the METRO Blue Line extension, a light‑rail project connecting Minneapolis to the suburbs of Robbinsdale, Crystal, and Brooklyn Park from the Met Council to Minnesota's Department of Transportation. The council has controversially overseen the almost $3 billion project while it has been delayed an additional four years and as costs rose $450 million to $550 million.

=== Chairs ===
Chair	Term	Appointed by
James L. Hetland Jr.	1967 – 1971	Harold LeVander
Albert Hofstede	1971 – 1973	Wendell Anderson
John E. Boland	1973 – 1979	Wendell Anderson
Charles R. Weaver Sr.	1979 – 1982	Al Quie
Gerald J. Isaacs	1983 – 1984	Rudy Perpich
Sandra S. Gardebring	1984 – 1986	Rudy Perpich
Steve Keefe	1986 – 1991	Rudy Perpich
Mary E. Anderson	1991 – 1992	Arne Carlson
Dottie Rietow	1992 – 1995	Arne Carlson
Curtis W. Johnson	1995 – 1999	Arne Carlson
Ted Mondale	1999 – 2003	Jesse Ventura
Peter Bell	2003 – 2011	Tim Pawlenty
Susan Haigh	2011 – 2015	Mark Dayton
Adam Duininck	2015 – 2017	Mark Dayton
Alene Tchourumoff	2017 – 2019	Mark Dayton
Nora Slawik	2019 – 2020	Tim Walz
Charlie Zelle	2020 – 2025	Tim Walz
Deb Barber	2025 –	Tim Walz

== Controversy ==
The Met Council has long raised the ire of suburban residents in the region. For instance, one source of controversy has been the council's power to invalidate the land use plans of municipalities which conflict with its own.

In 2004, the city of Lake Elmo refused to allow higher‑density development despite the Met Council's comprehensive development guide. The city challenged the Council's statutory authority to compel the city to modify its comprehensive plan in order to reach minimum density levels. However, the Minnesota Supreme Court found the city's argument unpersuasive "when viewed against the plain and unambiguous language of the statutes at issue."

Shortly after the 2010 Minnesota elections, Minnesota Legislative Auditor James Nobles recommended on January 21, 2011, that "the Legislature should restructure the governance of the Metropolitan Council" (page 41). The Legislative Auditor continued stating that "Maintaining an appointed Met Council would continue the Council's accountability problems ... Because Council members are appointed by the governor, however, they are not directly accountable to the public for (their) decisions." This lack of credibility and accountability was reported on by newspapers such as the St. Paul Pioneer Press, the Star Tribune, and online editorials like Politics In Minnesota.

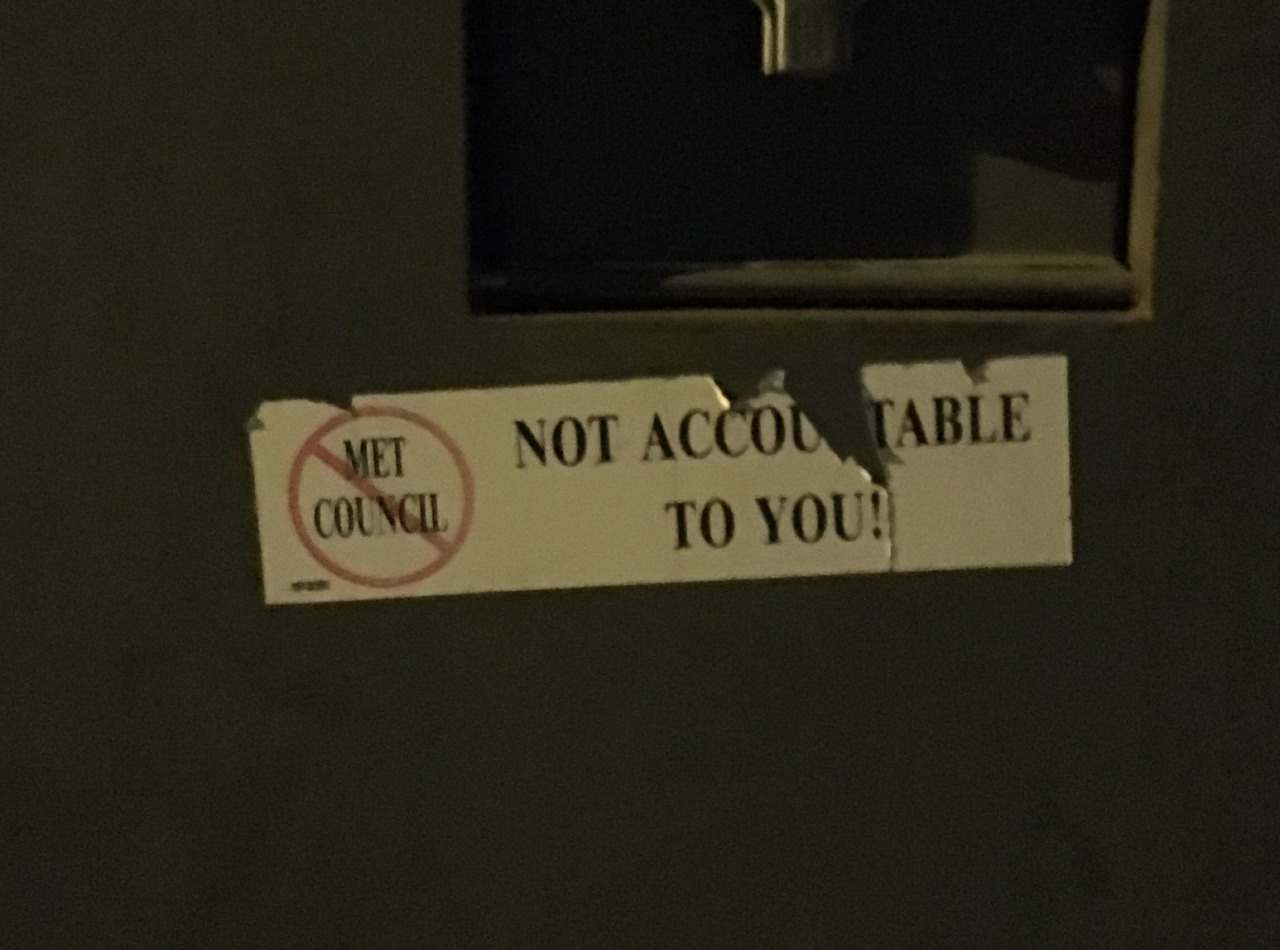
An anti-Metropolitan Council bumper sticker in Saint Paul

Marty Seifert, a Republican candidate for governor in the 2014 election, also called for the abolition of the Council, citing it as an unelected authority with taxation powers without representation. However, most of the responsibilities of the Metropolitan Council would still need to be maintained, including a Metropolitan Planning Organization that allows the region to receive federal transportation funding.

Criticisms of the council reached a high point in 2018 when the Met Council survived two attempted reforms at both the state and the federal level.

In late 2023, the Met Council came under fire again with a state legislative committee, the Metropolitan Governance Task Force, tasked with examining reformation, be it through elections or other means. In February 2024, the task force came up with six reformation paths, but the state legislature will need to take further action as warranted.

In May 2024, after years of mounting delays, cost overruns and mismanagement of the Metro Green Line Extension, the Minnesota State Legislature passed a law giving the Minnesota Department of Transportation greater oversight of future transit projects. Transportation-focused State Senator Scott Dibble sponsored the change, calling the Met Council "incompetent and incapable."
