= Politics of Minnesota =

Minnesota is known for a politically active citizenry. Minnesota has consistently high voter turnout, ranking highest or near-highest in recent elections. This is due in part to its same-day voter registration laws; previously unregistered voters can register on election day with evidence of residency.

The major political parties are the Minnesota Democratic–Farmer–Labor Party (DFL) and the Republican Party of Minnesota, along with the state-recognized minor parties: Grassroots–Legalize Cannabis, Legal Marijuana Now, and the Libertarian Party of Minnesota. The DFL was founded in 1944 when the Minnesota Democratic Party and Minnesota Farmer–Labor Party merged. The party is affiliated with the national Democratic Party. Supporters of the DFL are often referred to as "DFLers" in Minnesota as an alternative to "Democrats". The state Republican Party is affiliated with the national Republican Party.

== History ==
United States presidential election results for Minnesota
Year	Republican		Democratic		Third party(ies)	
Year	No.	%	No.	%	No.	%
1860	22,069	63.53%	11,920	34.31%	748	2.15%
1864	25,055	59.06%	17,367	40.94%	0	0.00%
1868	43,722	60.88%	28,096	39.12%	0	0.00%
1872	55,708	61.27%	35,211	38.73%	0	0.00%
1876	72,955	58.80%	48,587	39.16%	2,533	2.04%
1880	93,902	62.28%	53,315	35.36%	3,553	2.36%
1884	111,685	58.78%	70,065	36.87%	8,267	4.35%
1888	142,492	54.12%	104,385	39.65%	16,408	6.23%
1892	122,823	45.96%	100,920	37.76%	43,495	16.28%
1896	193,503	56.62%	139,735	40.89%	8,524	2.49%
1900	190,461	60.21%	112,901	35.69%	12,949	4.09%
1904	216,651	73.98%	55,187	18.84%	21,022	7.18%
1908	195,843	59.11%	109,401	33.02%	26,060	7.87%
1912	64,334	19.25%	106,426	31.84%	163,459	48.91%
1916	179,544	46.35%	179,152	46.25%	28,668	7.40%
1920	519,421	70.59%	142,994	19.43%	73,423	9.98%
1924	420,759	51.18%	55,913	6.80%	345,474	42.02%
1928	560,977	57.77%	396,451	40.83%	13,548	1.40%
1932	363,959	36.29%	600,806	59.91%	38,078	3.80%
1936	350,461	31.01%	698,811	61.84%	80,703	7.14%
1940	596,274	47.66%	644,196	51.49%	10,718	0.86%
1944	527,416	46.86%	589,864	52.41%	8,249	0.73%
1948	483,617	39.89%	692,966	57.16%	35,643	2.94%
1952	763,211	55.33%	608,458	44.11%	7,814	0.57%
1956	719,302	53.68%	617,525	46.08%	3,178	0.24%
1960	757,915	49.16%	779,933	50.58%	4,039	0.26%
1964	559,624	36.00%	991,117	63.76%	3,721	0.24%
1968	658,643	41.46%	857,738	54.00%	72,129	4.54%
1972	898,269	51.58%	802,346	46.07%	41,037	2.36%
1976	819,395	42.02%	1,070,440	54.90%	60,096	3.08%
1980	873,241	42.56%	954,174	46.50%	224,538	10.94%
1984	1,032,603	49.54%	1,036,364	49.72%	15,482	0.74%
1988	962,337	45.90%	1,109,471	52.91%	24,982	1.19%
1992	747,841	31.85%	1,020,997	43.48%	579,110	24.66%
1996	766,476	34.96%	1,120,438	51.10%	305,726	13.94%
2000	1,109,659	45.50%	1,168,266	47.91%	160,760	6.59%
2004	1,346,695	47.61%	1,445,014	51.09%	36,678	1.30%
2008	1,275,409	43.82%	1,573,354	54.06%	61,606	2.12%
2012	1,320,225	44.96%	1,546,167	52.65%	70,169	2.39%
2016	1,323,232	44.93%	1,367,825	46.44%	254,176	8.63%
2020	1,484,065	45.28%	1,717,077	52.40%	76,029	2.32%
2024	1,519,032	46.68%	1,656,979	50.92%	77,909	2.39%

Treemap of the popular vote by county, 2016 presidential election.

Historically, the state was a Republican stronghold, never voting Democratic from statehood until 1932, however, since then it has voted Democratic all but three presidential election cycles: 1952, 1956, and 1972. 1952 is also the last time the state voted for a non-incumbent Republican, and only once (2016) has the state voted to the right of the nation since. Minnesotans have voted for Democratic presidential candidates ever since 1976, more times consecutively than any other state outside of the South, and longer than any other ongoing streak. Minnesota and the District of Columbia were the only electoral votes not won by incumbent Republican President Ronald Reagan in 1984. Minnesota voters instead chose former vice president and Senator Walter Mondale, a Minnesota native. Mondale or Hubert Humphrey were on the Democratic ticket as candidates for president or Vice President in the 1964, 1968, 1976, 1980, and 1984 elections.

Historically, Republicans have come close to winning Minnesota—Ronald Reagan lost by a small margin in 1984, and Donald Trump was defeated by 44,593 votes in 2016. Trump's near-win has motivated the GOP to invest heavily in the state, matching resources allocated to other key Midwestern battlegrounds like Michigan, Pennsylvania, and Wisconsin.

In the early 2000s, presidential campaigns have viewed the 27 electoral college votes from Minnesota, Wisconsin, and Iowa as a bloc that is subject to swing toward either major party, and equal in value to Florida's 27 electoral votes. This analysis resulted in dozens of visits by candidates in the final months of both the 2000 and 2004 campaigns. However, in the 2008 United States presidential election, Barack Obama won the state by more than 10 percentage points.

Minnesota's congressional delegation is split with 4 Democratic and 4 Republican members of Congress and mostly has been split since the early 1990s (see Minnesota's congressional delegations).

In the 2006 mid-term election, Democrats were elected to all state offices except for governor and lieutenant governor, where Republicans Tim Pawlenty and Carol Molnau narrowly won reelection. The DFL also posted double-digit gains in both houses of the legislature, elected DFLer Amy Klobuchar to the U.S. Senate, and increased the Democratic U.S. House caucus by one, Tim Walz (MN-01).

However, in the 2010 mid-terms, the 8th district, a Democratic stronghold for decades in the Iron Range, elected Republican Chip Cravaack over long-time incumbent Jim Oberstar, splitting the delegation again, 4 to 4. Republicans also captured both houses of the Minnesota Legislature for the first time in decades. However, Democratic candidate Mark Dayton won control of the governorship, making all of Minnesota's statewide elected officials Democrats. In the 2012 election, Democrat Rick Nolan recaptured Oberstar's seat, bringing the ratio to 5 Democrats and 3 Republicans again at the national level. They also captured majorities in both chambers of the Minnesota Legislature.

In 2016, Donald Trump was defeated by just 44,593 votes. Trump's near-win has motivated the GOP to invest heavily in the state, matching resources allocated to other key Midwestern battlegrounds like Michigan, Pennsylvania, and Wisconsin.

During the 2018 mid-term elections the Republican party recovered both the 8th district and the 1st district, as the former representative of the first district, Tim Walz (D) ran for and was elected governor. The Minnesota Democratic–Farmer–Labor Party flipped two Twin Cities suburban districts, the 2nd and the 3rd district with candidates Angie Craig and Dean Phillips, which maintained the ratio of 5 Democrats and 3 Republicans representing Minnesota at the national level. The 2018 mid-term election also saw the election of Ilhan Omar as representative of Minnesota's 5th congressional district. She gained national recognition for her involvement with The Squad, a progressive group of four newly elected representatives including New York Representative Alexandria Ocasio-Cortez.

=== State legislature ===
From 1915 to 1973, elections to the Minnesota Legislature were nonpartisan, though members organized into a Conservative Caucus and a Liberal Caucus. Most Republicans joined the Conservatives and most Farmer Laborites joined the Liberals, while the Democrats were more split. The Farmer Labor Party was successful statewide in the 1930s but only controlled the Minnesota House of Representatives twice.

=== Redistricting ===
Redistricting has often been very contentious in Minnesota. For 1913, the legislature passed a legislative map which was litigated the following year, for reasons including malapportionment. The Minnesota Supreme Court upheld the map, following many other states in a pre-Reynolds v. Sims era. The legislature also passed a congressional map for the state's new tenth district. Like many agriculture-based states, Minnesota lost a congressional seat after the 1930 census. The then-Conservative controlled legislature passed a map which Governor Floyd Olson then vetoed. The House of Representatives attempted to overrule and force the state Secretary of State to implement the map. He was sued, and the case made its way through the state courts before going to the United States Supreme Court. In Smiley v. Holm, the Court overturned the State Supreme Court and struck down the map, leading congressional seats in the 1932 House elections to be elected held at-large. The next year, a new congressional map was passed and implemented, staying in place until 1961.

In 1958, a group of voters sued to overturn the still in place 1913 legislative maps, arguing the maps were grossly malapportioned. In Magraw v. Donovan, the courts agreed, but allowed the legislature time to redraw the maps. In 1959, the legislature passed a map which made minor changes, notably preserving the districts in Southeastern, Central, and Northeastern Minnesota. It increased the number of legislative districts in Hennepin and Ramsey County from 14 to 19 (two members were elected to each legislative district in Minneapolis while in Ramsey County two house districts were nested within each legislative district). Voters again sued to overturn the legislative maps in 1964 under the principle of one man, one vote and again the court deferred to the legislature to redraw the maps. The legislature and Governor Karl Rolvaag fought over new maps, before one was signed into law in 1966.

In 1971, the legislature passed a new map during a special session, but Governor Wendell R. Anderson vetoed the map over its use of multimember districts in Minneapolis, Duluth, and the Iron Range to achieve an odd number of House and Senate seats, a longtime practice by the legislature. Voters also had sued to overturn the 1966 maps, and the federal district court intervened, drawing a map with 35 Senate districts and 105 House districts. In Minnesota State Senate v. Beens, the Supreme Court overturned the district court. The district court returned with a new plan, which brought the state legislature down to its current 67 senators and 134 representatives.

== Regional differences ==
In 2020, The Washington Post released an article that categorized the state into five regions based on political attitudes: Minneapolis and Saint Paul, the suburban regions of those two cities, the Iron Range, a section of southeastern Minnesota, and the remaining parts of the state (dubbed "Greater Minnesota").

Greater Minnesota is a largely rural area that saw a significant swing toward Republicans in 2016, with Trump carrying every county. While Democrats hoped to win back voters in 2020 and 2024 by highlighting the negative impact of Trump's trade policies on agriculture, Republicans made further gains by, among others, promoting the benefits of the USMCA trade agreement.

== Third-party movements ==
The progressive Minnesota Farmer–Labor Party, formed in 1920, provided three governors, four United States senators, and eight members of the U.S. House of Representatives from its founding in 1918 until its merger with the Democratic Party in 1944.

The centrist Reform Party was able to elect the former mayor of Brooklyn Park, and former professional wrestler, Jesse Ventura to the governorship in 1998. The Minnesota branch of the Reform party split off from the national party due to unhappiness about Pat Buchanan's influence in the party, and was renamed the Independence Party. The Independence Party had been able to sustain sufficient support to maintain major party status until 2014.

The state's Green Party has elected several city council members and other local office-holders in Duluth, Minneapolis and Winona, and has made strong runs for state legislature during the past two election cycles. In 2000, Green Party candidate Ralph Nader received just over 5% of the presidential votes cast, gaining Major Party status for the party. The Green Party lost that status in 2004, but retains minor party status having exceeded a 2% threshold.

In the 2006 election, voters in Minneapolis approved a referendum (by a decisive 65% to 35%) to utilize the single transferable vote (STV)—commonly referred to as "instant-runoff voting" and "ranked choice voting"—in future city elections, which is expected to be a boon for third parties. The drive for IRV began in the 1990s as part of the Green Party's platform, although all political parties except the Republicans supported it in the Minneapolis referendum.

== Federal representation ==
=== U.S. Senate ===
Minnesota's two U.S. senators are elected at large:

- Senior U.S. Senator Amy Klobuchar (DFL)
- Junior U.S. Senator Tina Smith (DFL)
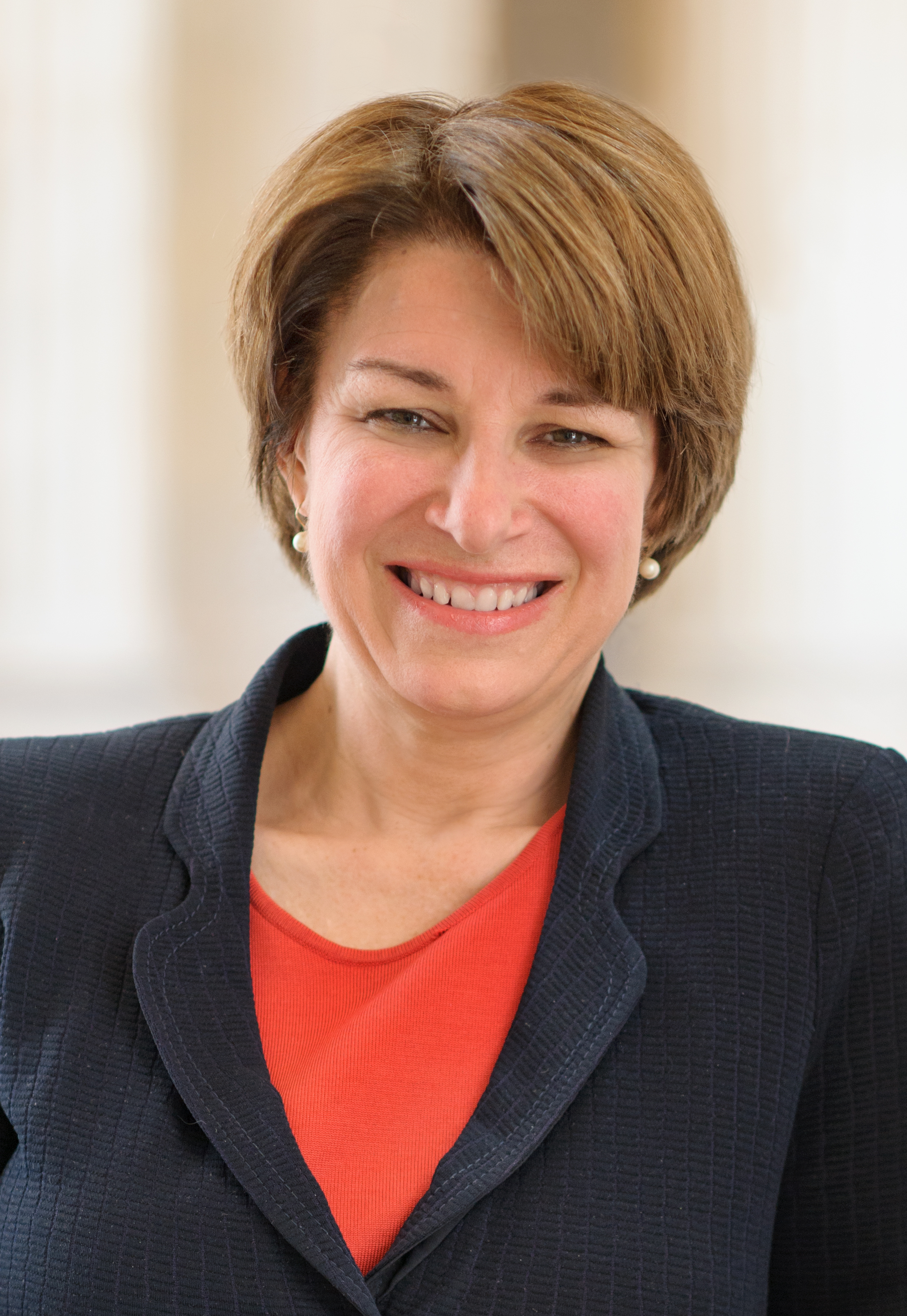
Amy Klobuchar

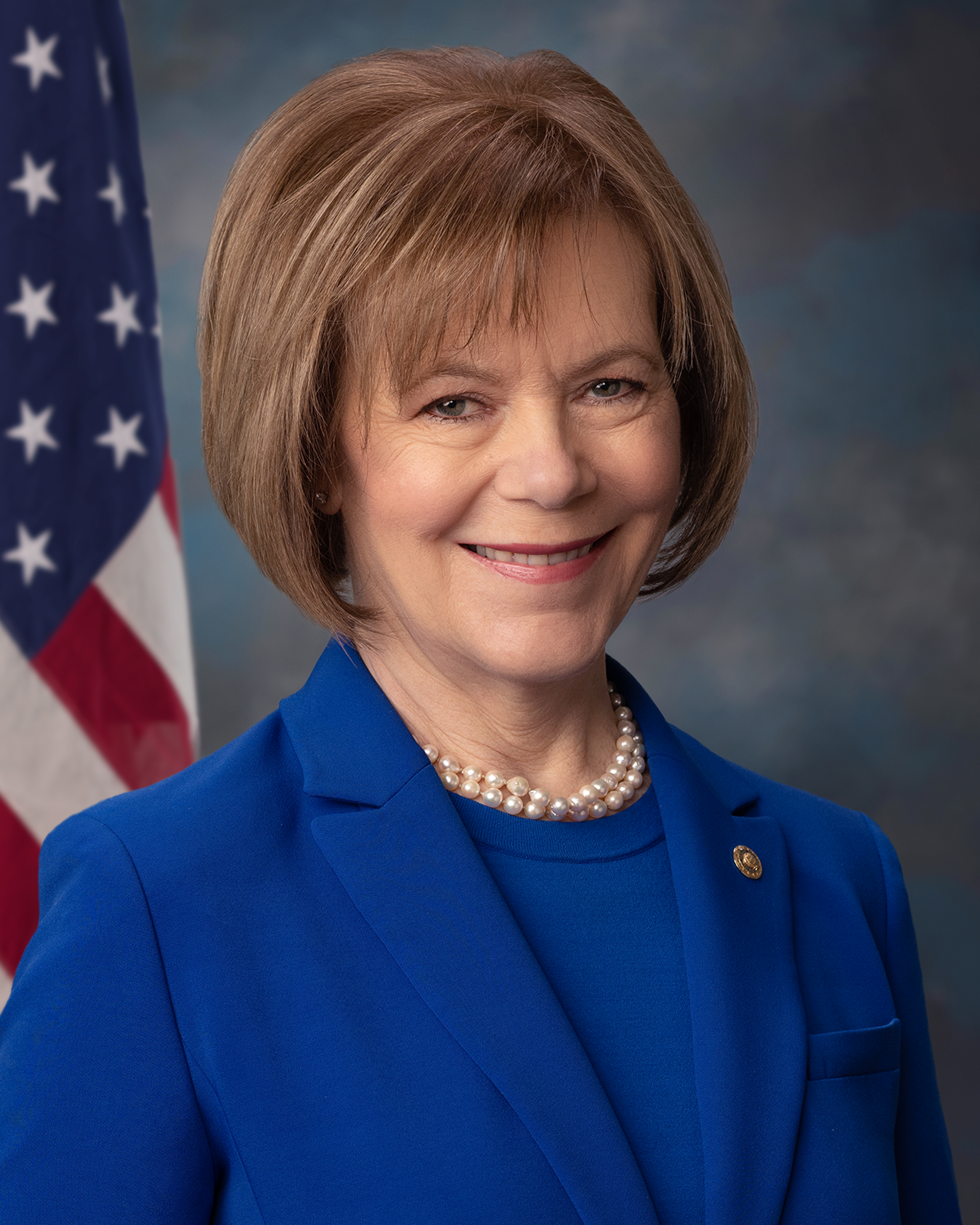
Tina Smith

=== U.S. House of Representatives ===
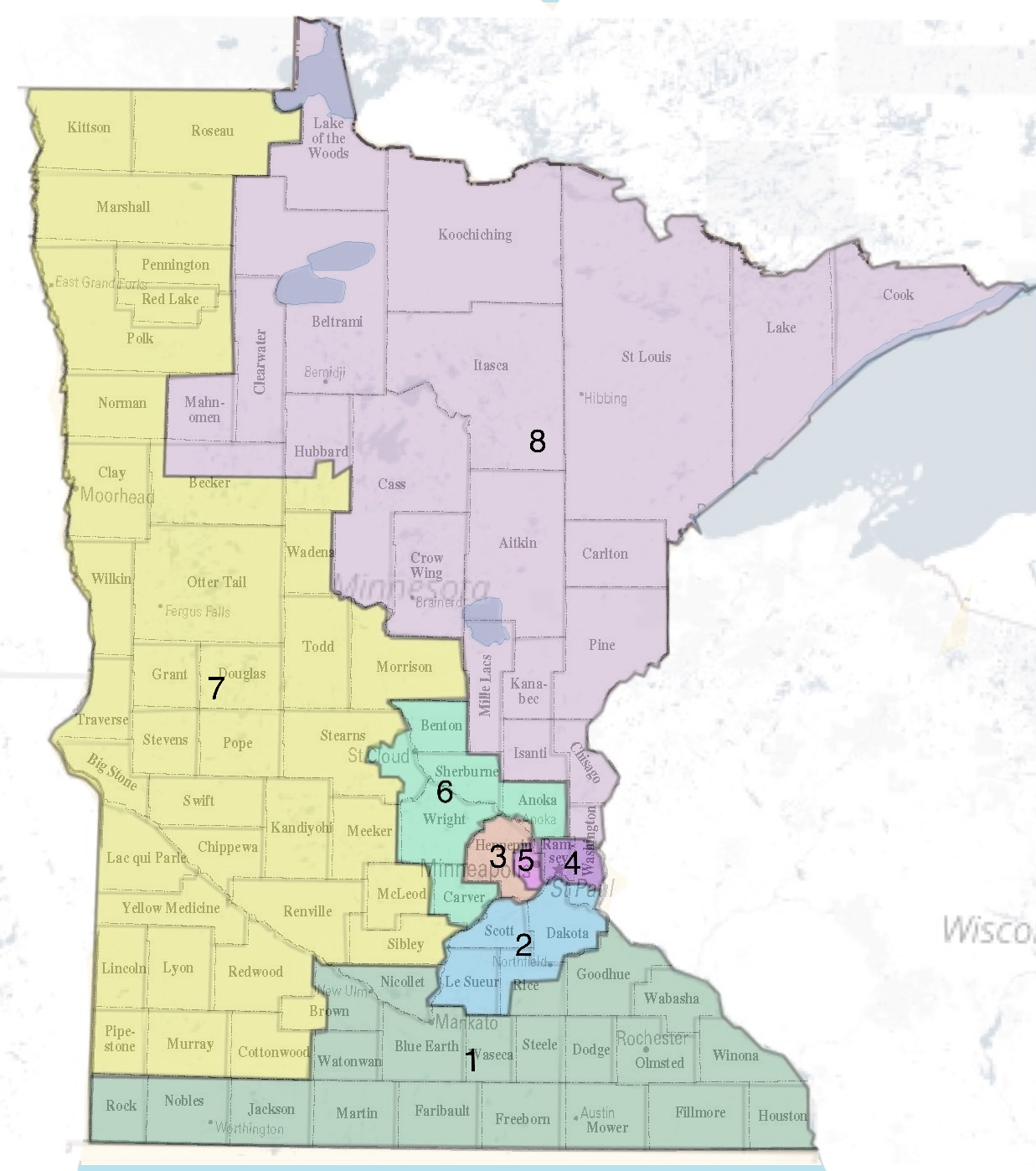
Map of Minnesota's congressional districts.

Minnesota has eight congressional districts. There were 9th and 10th districts but they were eliminated in 1963 and 1933 respectively. Since the early 1960s, the state's congressional districts have been drawn by a judicial panel due to the legislature's failure to enact a redistricting plan after every decennial census.

U.S. House of Representatives:

- Minnesota's 1st congressional district extends across southern Minnesota from the border with South Dakota to the border of Wisconsin – Rep. Brad Finstad (Republican).
- Minnesota's 2nd congressional district spans the width of the entire southern metro area and contains all of Scott, Le Sueur, Goodhue and Rice Counties – Rep. Angie Craig (DFL).
- Minnesota's 3rd congressional district encompasses the suburbs of Hennepin County to the north, west, and south of Minneapolis – Rep. Kelly Morrison (DFL).
- Minnesota's 4th congressional district covers most of Ramsey County including all of St. Paul and several St. Paul suburbs – Rep. Betty McCollum (DFL).
- Minnesota's 5th congressional district covers eastern Hennepin County, including the entire city of Minneapolis, Minnesota, along with parts of Anoka and Ramsey counties – Rep. Ilhan Omar (DFL).
- Minnesota's 6th congressional district includes most or all of Benton, Sherburne, Stearns, Wright, Anoka, and Washington counties – Rep. Tom Emmer (Republican).
- Minnesota's 7th congressional district covers almost all of the western side of Minnesota from the Canada–US border down to Lincoln County and is the largest district in the state – Rep. Michelle Fischbach (Republican).
- Minnesota's 8th congressional district covers the northeastern part of Minnesota and includes Duluth, Hibbing, and the Mesabi Range – Rep. Pete Stauber (Republican).
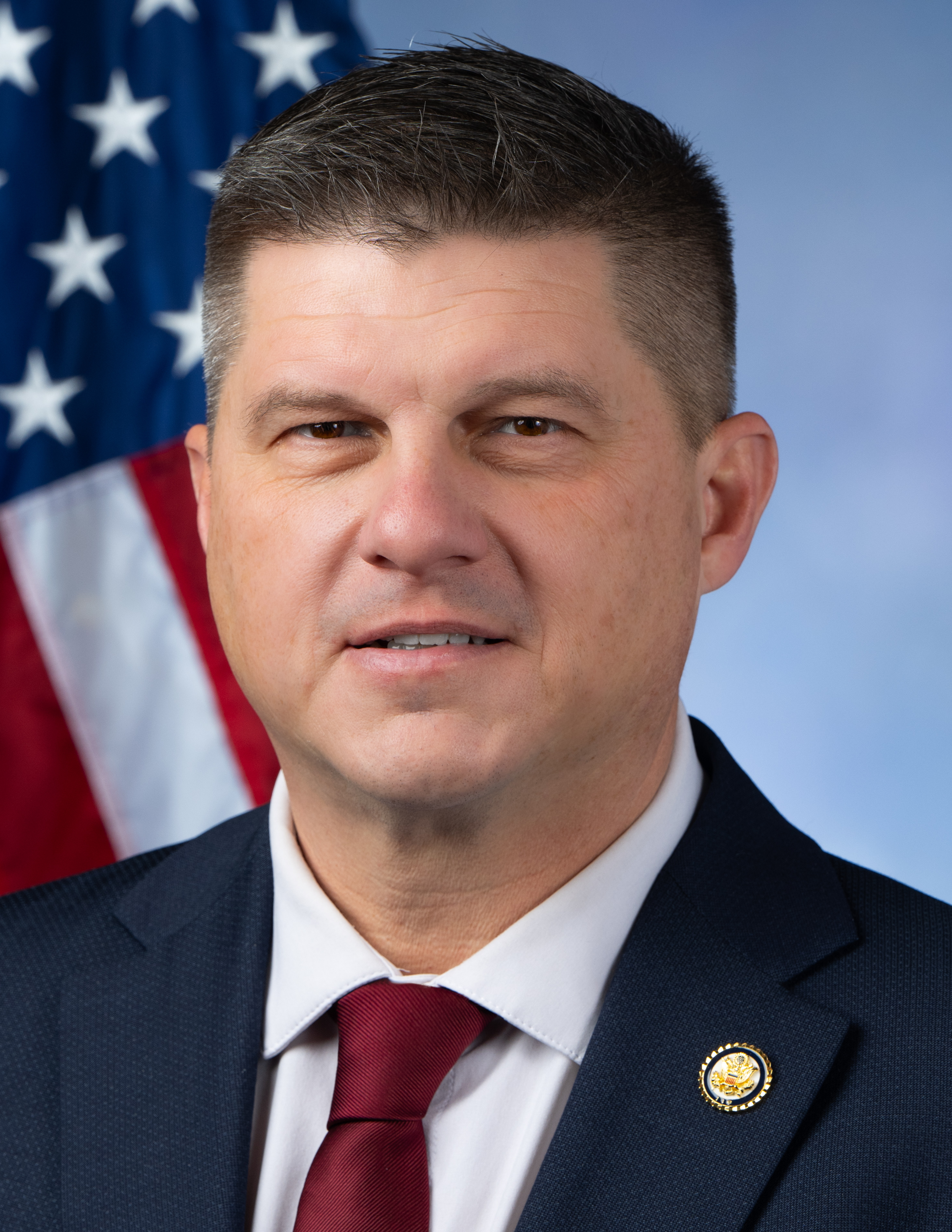
Brad Finstad, MN-01

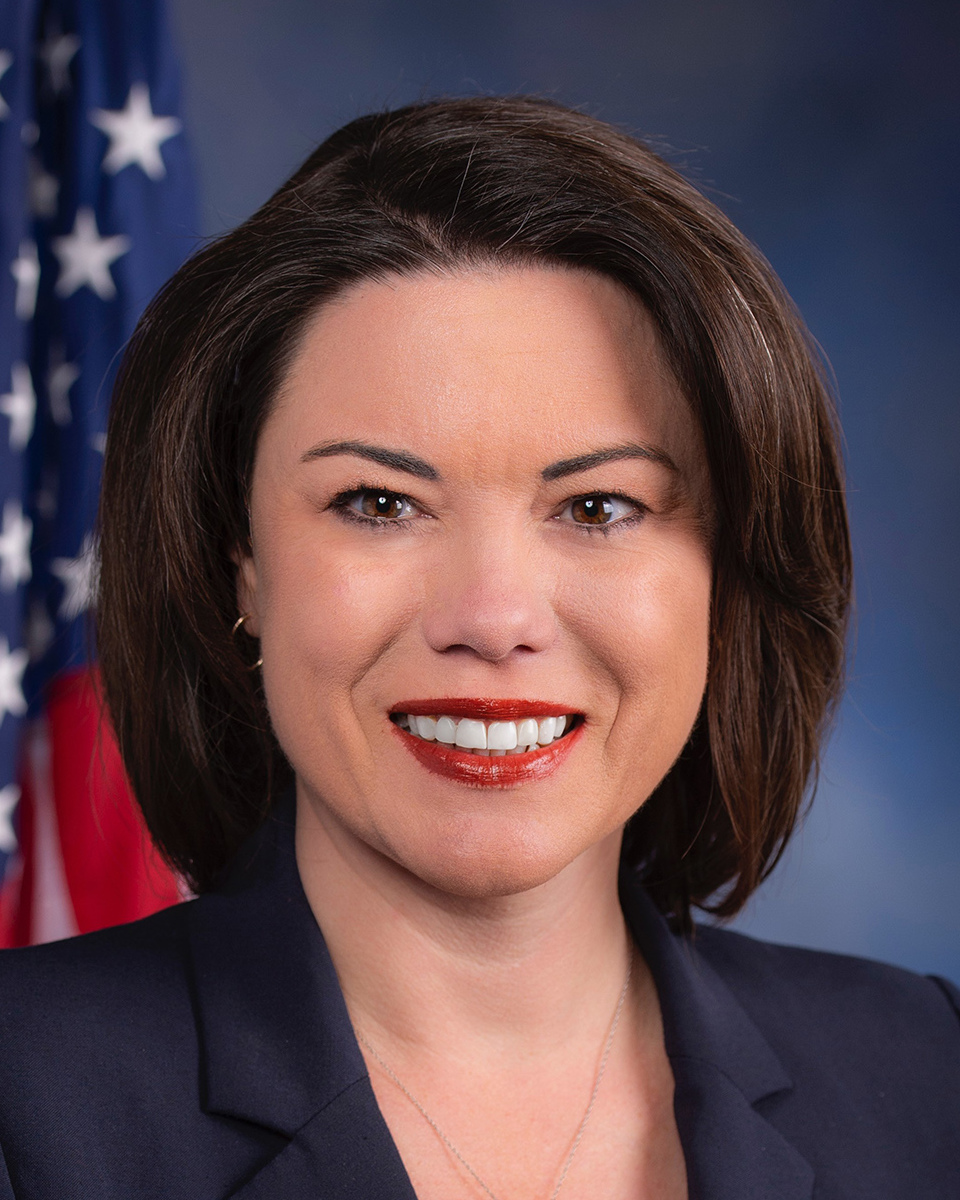
Angie Craig, MN-02

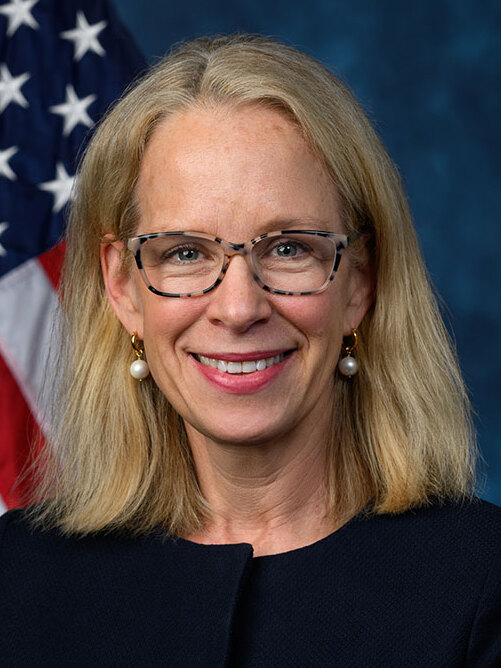
Kelly Morrison, MN-03

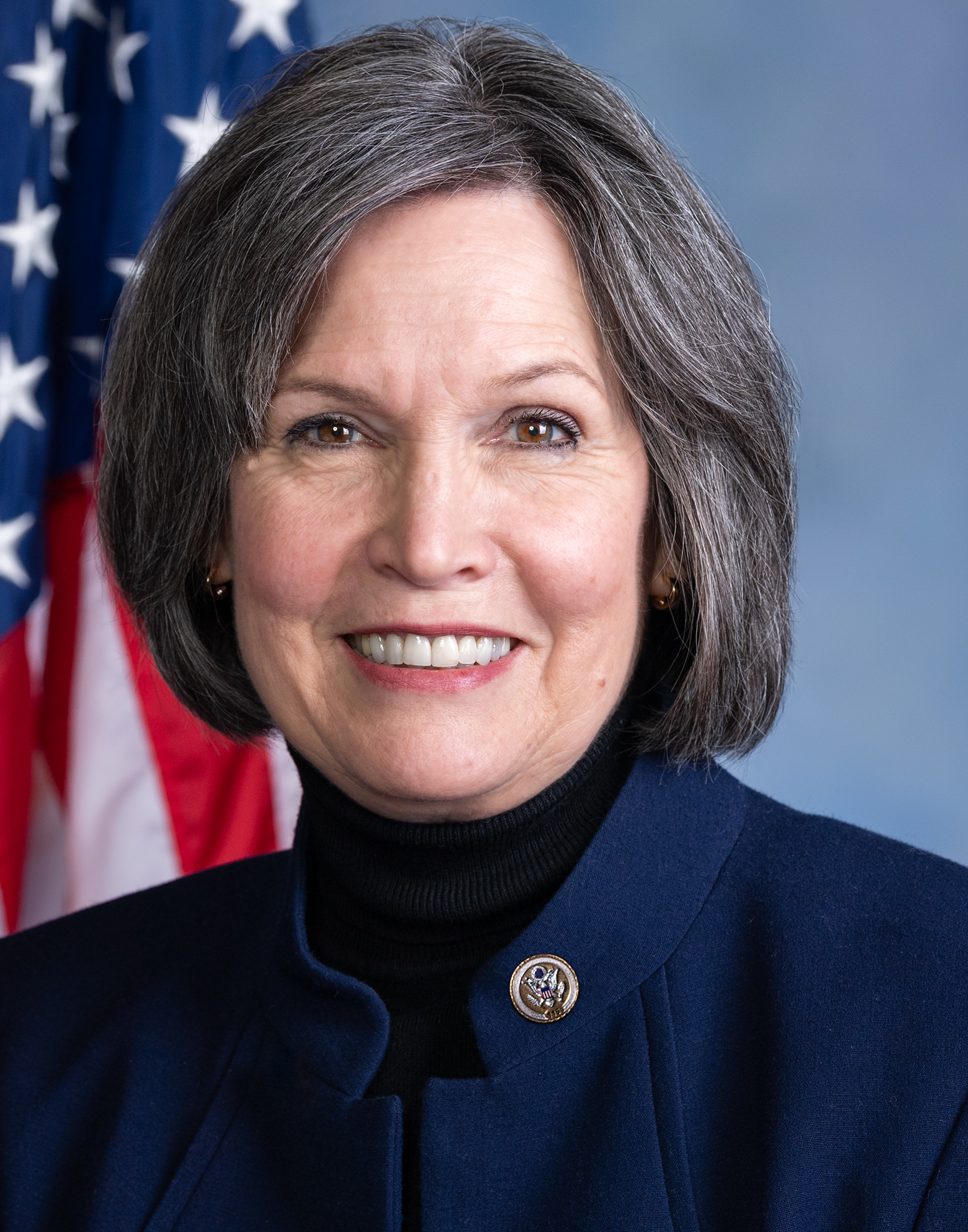
Betty McCollum, MN-04

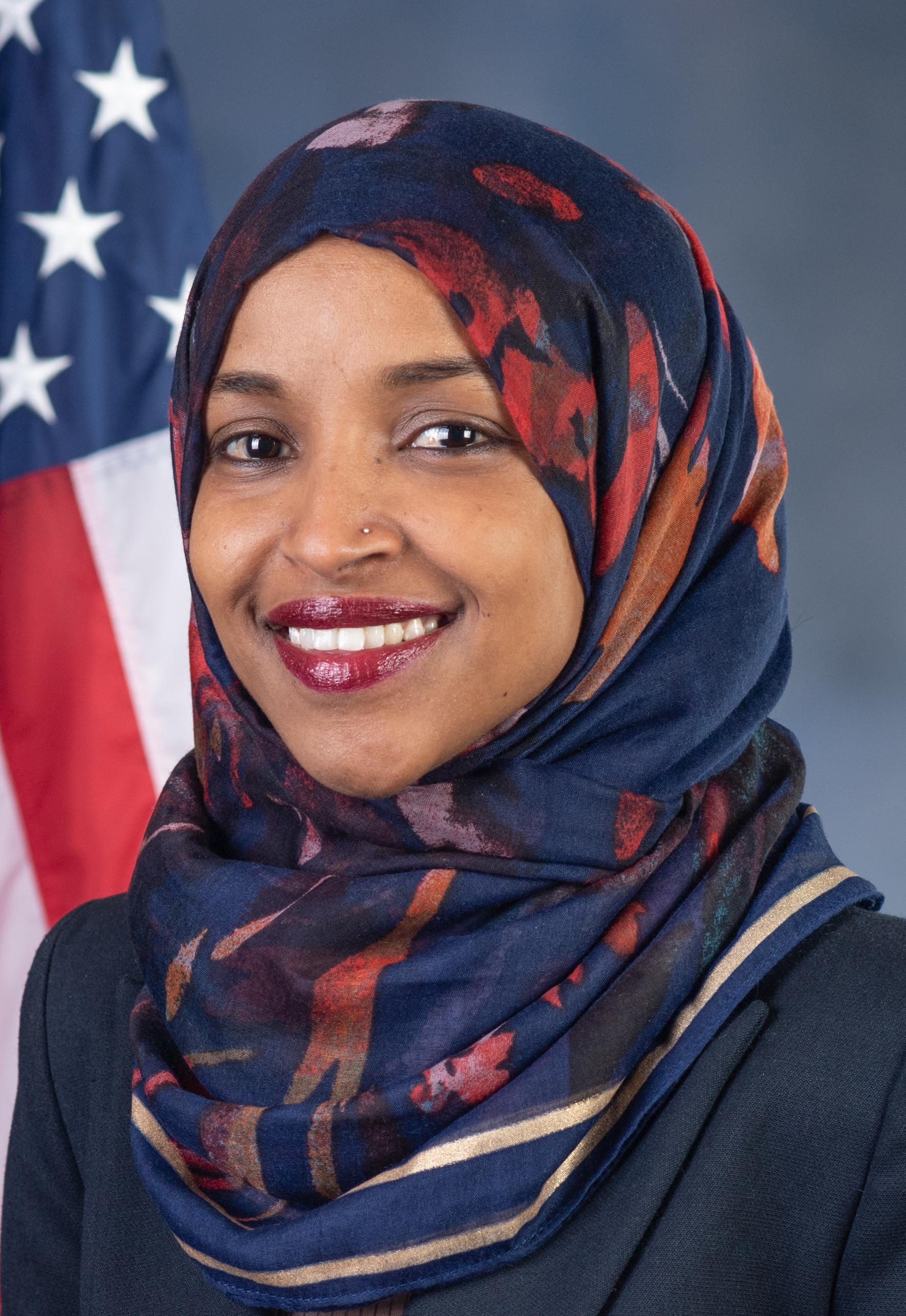
Ilhan Omar, MN-05

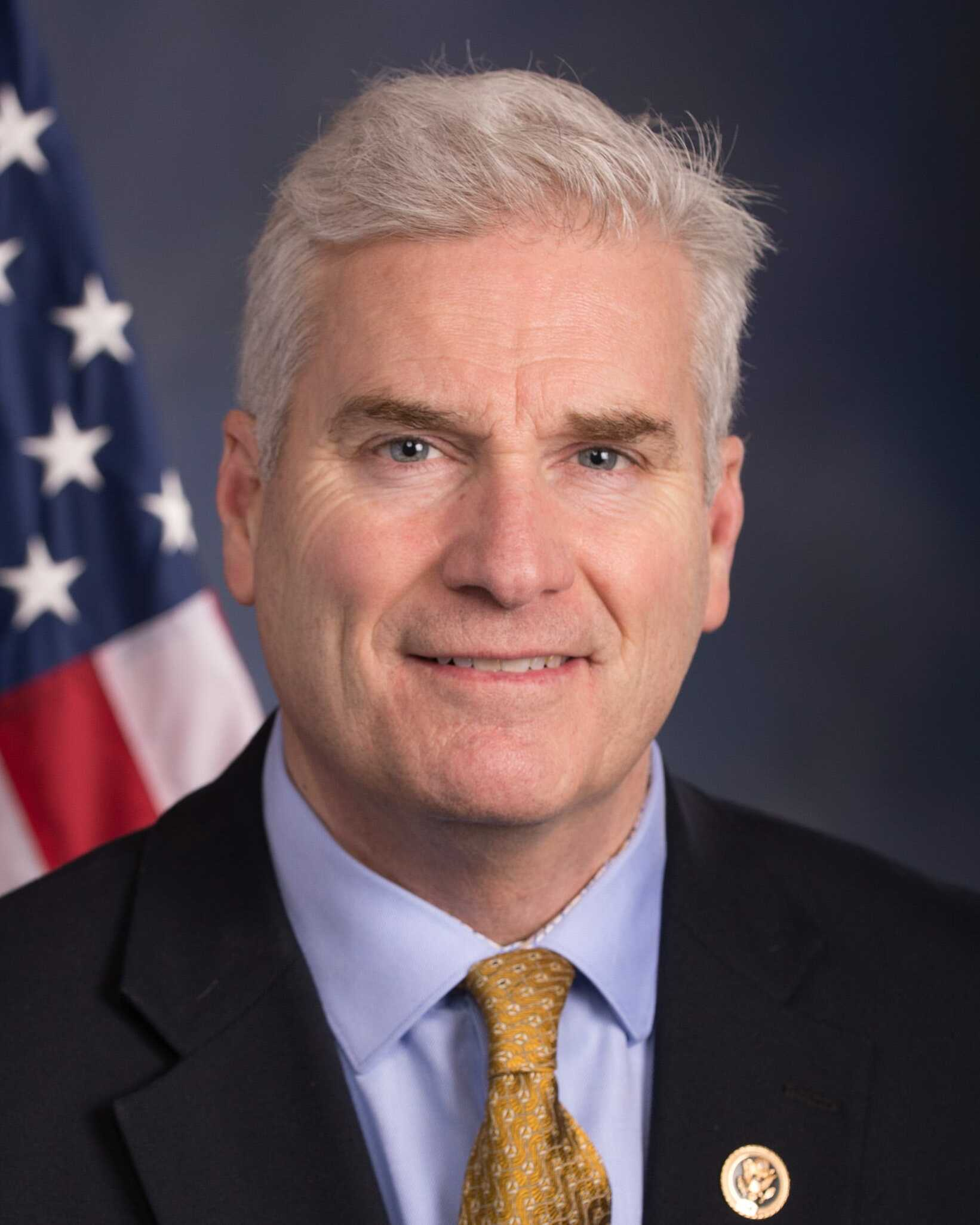
Tom Emmer, MN-06

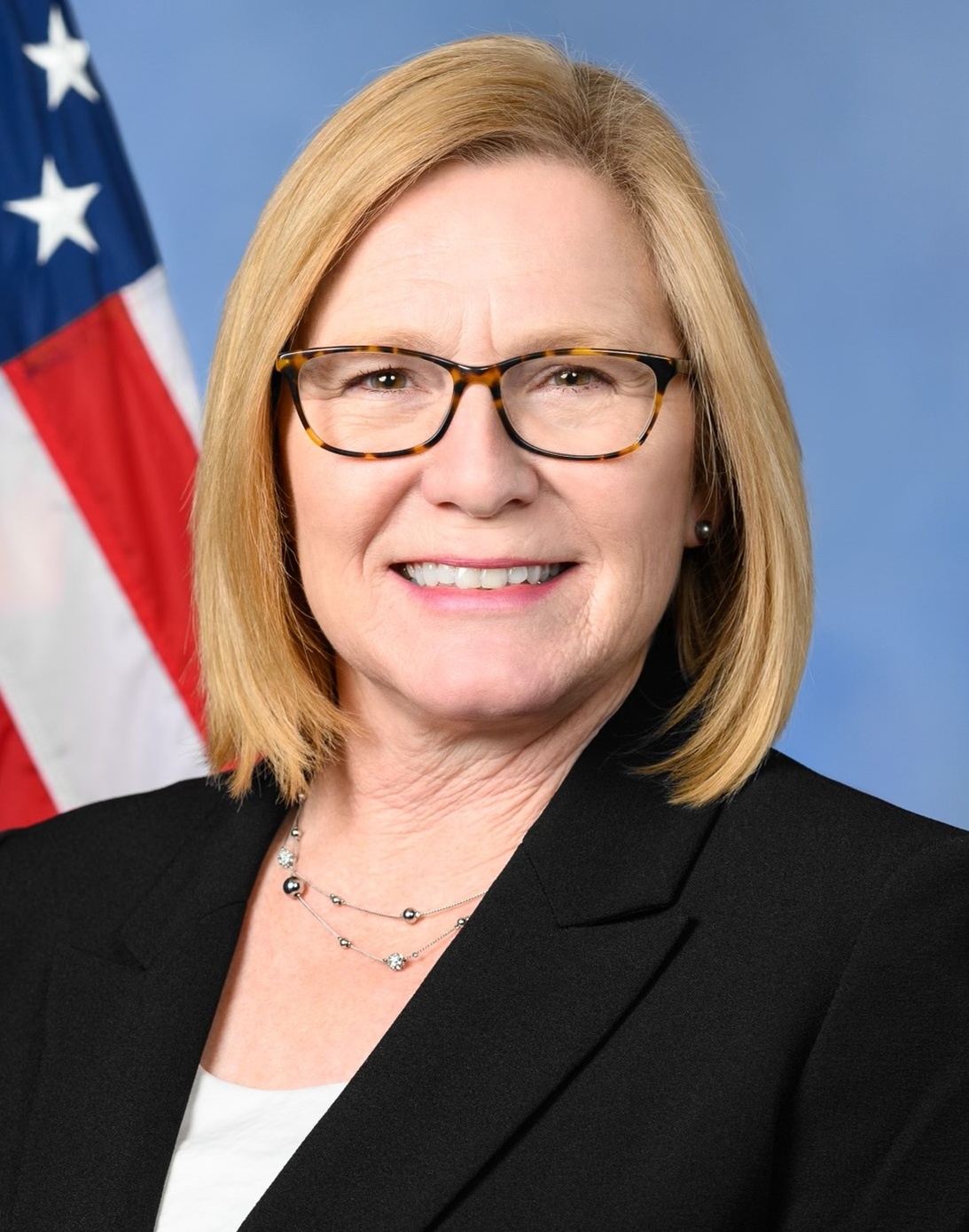
Michelle Fischbach, MN-07

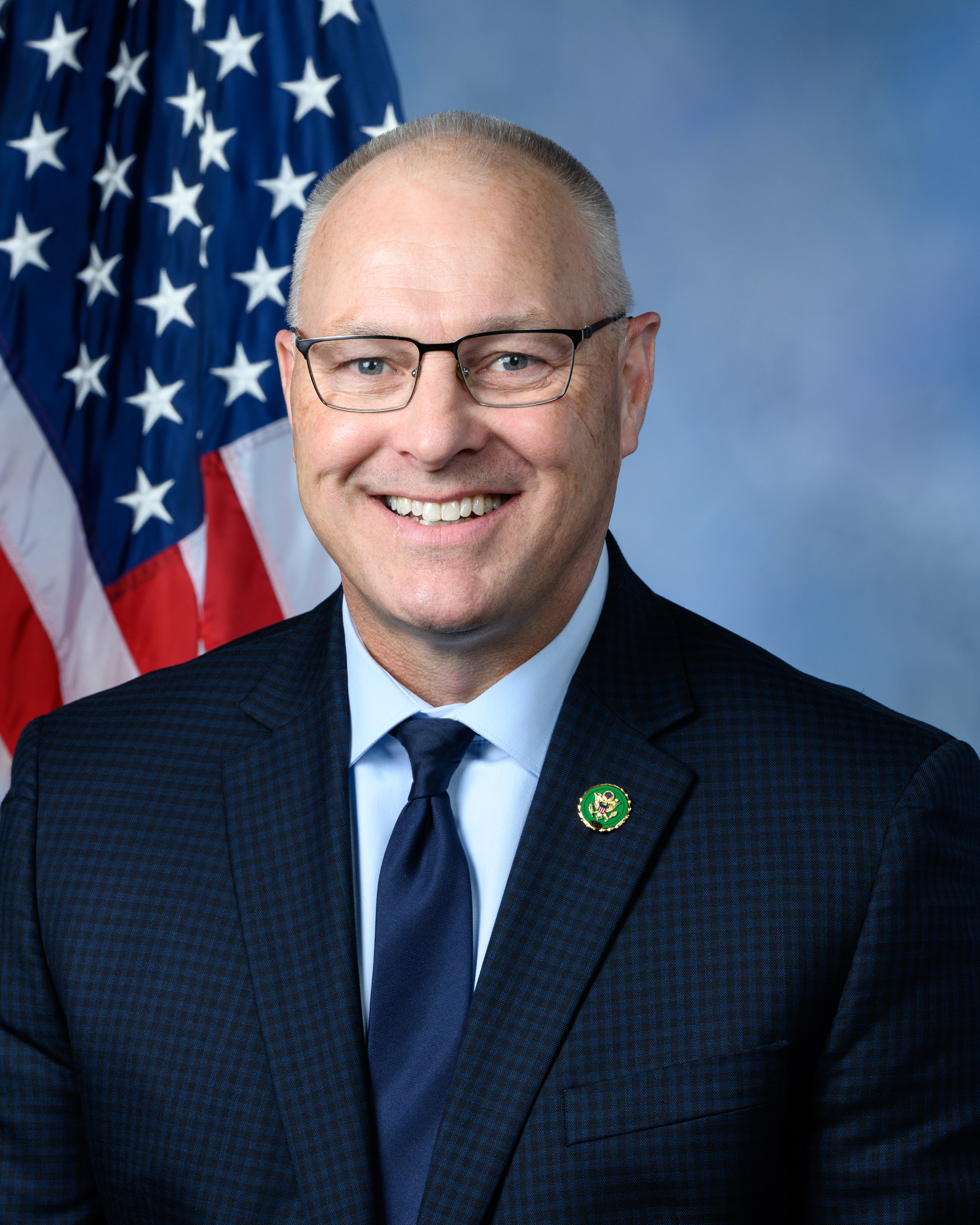
Pete Stauber, MN-08

District political leanings – 118th United States Congress
District	1st	2nd	3rd	4th	5th	6th	7th	8th	State
CPVI	R+7	D+1	D+8	D+17	D+30	R+12	R+19	R+8	D+1

== Historical figures ==
An overview of some of the most politically important historical figures of the state:

- A. A. Ames, Mayor and Legislator
- Michele Bachmann, Congresswoman
- Elmer Benson, Senator and Governor
- Arne Carlson, Governor
- Peggy Flanagan, Lieutenant Governor
- Orville Freeman, Governor
- Melissa Hortman, Speaker of the House
- Hubert Humphrey, Senator
- Frank Kellogg, Senator
- Amy Klobuchar, Senator
- John Lind, Congressman and Governor
- Charles August Lindbergh, Congressman
- Eugene McCarthy, Senator
- Walter Mondale, Attorney General and Senator
- Floyd B. Olson, Governor
- Ilhan Omar, Congresswoman
- John S. Pillsbury, Governor
- Alexander Ramsey, Governor
- Martin Olav Sabo, Congressman and Legislator
- Henry Hastings Sibley, Governor
- Harold Stassen, Governor
- Sylvanus Stockwell, Legislator
- Tim Walz, Governor
- Paul Wellstone, Senator
- Jesse Ventura, Governor

== See also ==
- History of Minnesota
- History of the Minnesota Democratic-Farmer-Labor Party
- Political party strength in Minnesota
- List of political parties in Minnesota
