= Grace F. Kaercher =

American court reporter (1887–1965)

Grace Kaercher Davis
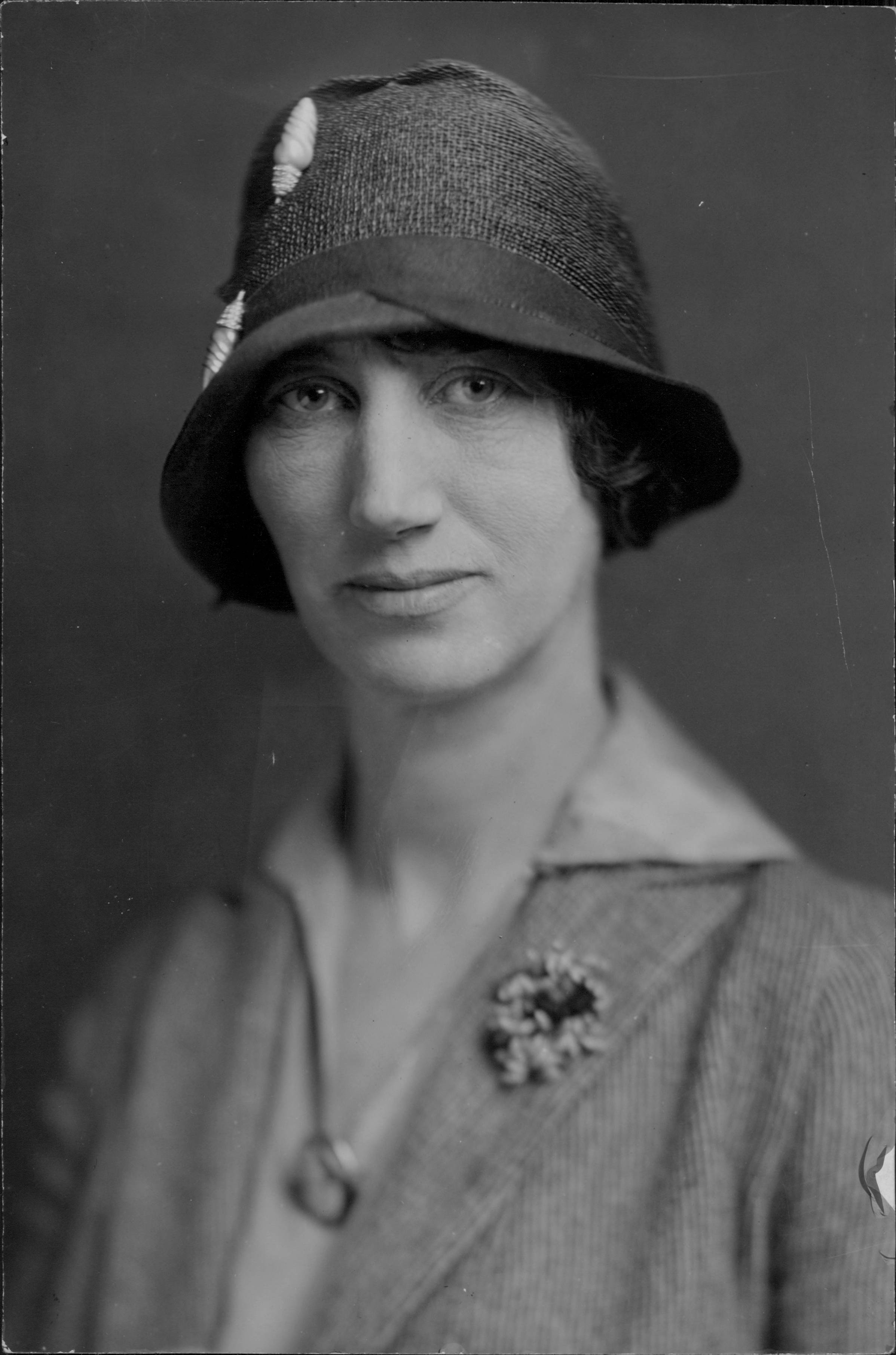
- Kaercher c. 1928

Court Clerk for the Minnesota Supreme Court
- In office 1923–1935
- Preceded by: Herman J. Mueller
- Succeeded by: Russell O. Gunderson
- In office 1939–1955
- Preceded by: Russell O. Gunderson
- Succeeded by: Frank Larkin

Personal details
- Born: June 17, 1887 Auburn, Iowa, U.S.
- Died: September 27, 1965 (aged 78) Minneapolis, Minnesota, U.S.
- Resting place: Mound Cemetery; Ortonville, Minnesota, U.S.
- Other political affiliations: Republican
- Spouse: Edward Alanson Davis
- Children: 2

Grace Fayette Davis (June 17, 1887 – September 27, 1965) born Grace Fayette Kaercher, was an American stenographer and court reporter for the Minnesota Supreme Court, Kaercher's career as a court reporter spanned 28 years from 1923 to 1935 and again from 1939 to 1955. Kaercher was the first woman elected to a statewide office in the state of Minnesota and was the first female elected to Clerk of the Supreme Court in any state.

== Biography ==
Kaercher was born on June 17, 1887, in Auburn, Iowa, she was the daughter of Aaron Benjamin Kaercher, an attorney from Ortonville, Minnesota, and Gertrude M. Kaercher (nee: Johnson). According to Steven Aggergaard of the Minnesota Supreme Court Historical Society, Aaron Kaercher served as the county attorney of Big Stone County, Minnesota for eight years which inspired Grace to pursue a career in the field of law. Before entering politics Kaercher worked in her father's law office and was the associate editor of the Ortonville Independent newspaper.

In 1922 following the death of her father Aaron, the Republican Party of Big Stone County endorsed Kaercher for the office of court clerk for the Minnesota Supreme Court. At the time Kaercher was the secretary treasurer of the Big Stone National Loan Association and was the chair of the women's Republican committee of Big Stone County. Kaercher ended up winning the 1922 Minnesota election for court reporter winning a total of 53.86% of the vote with a +7.71% margin of victory against fellow Republican Herman J. Mueller. According to the Minnesota Historical Election Archive and the Minnesota State Law Library Kaercher was the first woman to appear on a general election ballot in the state of Minnesota.

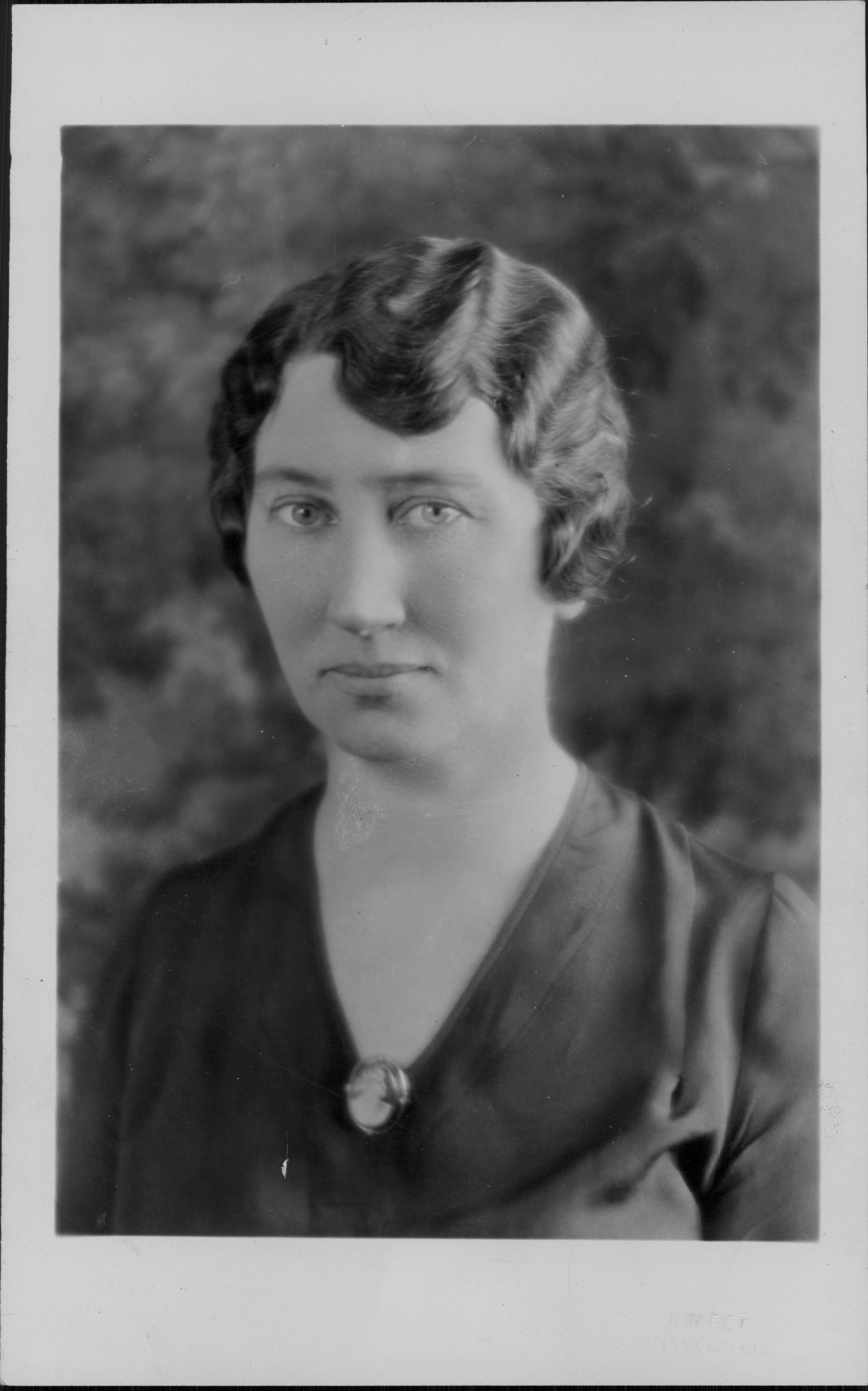
Mrs. Grace Kaercher Davis in 1930

Kaercher would successfully hold the office of court reporter from 1922 to 1935 when she was defeated in the 1934 election by Farmer-Labor candidate Russell O. Gunderson. Kaercher would again hold the office of court reporter from 1939 to 1955. Kaercher unsuccessfully ran for a seat in the Minnesota House of Representatives for Minnesota's 3rd congressional district in 1944, she lost to Minnesota Republican Richard P. Gale. In 1954 Kaercher lost the 1954 election for the clerk of the Minnesota Supreme Court, she lost to Democratic–Farmer–Labor candidate Frank Larkin.

Following her 28-year career Kaercher was unable to seek reelection due to a mandatory retirement law passed in Minnesota in 1953 which required public employees to retired after 25 years of service. Kaercher died on September 27, 1965, in Minneapolis. Kaercher is buried with her family in Ortonville, Minnesota.

== Personal life ==
Kaercher was married to Edward A. Davis on May 25, 1927, she first appeared on the Minnesota ballot as "Grace F. Kaercher Davis" beginning in 1930.
