= Regional development commission (Minnesota) =

Regional Development Commissions
Regional planning organizations overview
- Formed: 1969
- Jurisdiction: Minnesota, United States
- Headquarters: Various (multi-regional)
- Regional planning organizations executive: Local elected officials (board members)
- Parent department: Minnesota State Legislature

Regional development commissions are regional governments in the U.S. state of Minnesota, made up of a board of local elected officials from counties, cities, schools boards, public interest groups and transit systems that provide cooperation and coordination on broad regional issues. The regional development commissions, commonly abbreviated as RDC, were established by state law in 1969 to provide a variety of governmental assistance to local governments. They are a type of regional planning organization that have responsibility to provide technical assistance to a broad multi-county area of the state, and their functions are similar to the metropolitan planning organization in urbanized areas. As their intent was to support local governments, they frequently provide a coordinating role and generally do not exercise any type of binding authority over local matters.

== History ==
As part of the Governorship of Harold LaVander, economic development became a significant policy directive with a strong desire to drive new businesses and focus on the needs of rural areas outside of metropolitan planning areas. During this time, the federal Department of Housing and Urban Development and the Department of Commerce provided funding for economic development agencies across the United States. In response to this, the state legislature created an act for the development of regional development commissions in areas where existing planning organizations did not exist. Each area of the state was given time to offer their local support to be included in one or more regions. Each local government had to petition for the creation or inclusion in an RDC. The Arrowhead Region was the first to formally organize and be certified. Other areas soon followed. Over the years internal fighting between some areas of the state and anti-government sentiment led to the dissolution of some regional development commissions. These included Region 4 in western Minnesota, Region 7W near the center of the state and Region 10 which consisted of the 11 county area in southeastern Minnesota.

Over the years there has been significant interest in developing new regional development commission in southeastern Minnesota as the lack of an RDC leaves local governments at a competitive disadvantage compared to areas that do have them or that have an MPO. In response to this the area in Region 4 designated the non-profit organization West Central Initiative to become their de facto Regional Development Organization in 1984 and it was designated as a federal development agency in 1985 for the same area.

== Functions ==
Common functions and services include urban planning, transportation planning, economic development assistance, emergency management coordination, training, outreach, community organizing and others. However, the RDCs work with a wide variety of functions and each may offer additional services based on the types of needs in the region. For example, all of the RDCs are designated by the United States Department of Commerce, Economic Development Administration as Economic Development Districts. As a result, they can accept and offer federal grants and economic development loans to local governments and businesses. Others include within the organization the federally designated Area Agency on Aging that focuses on the health and well being needs of the elderly in the region.

Some of the transportation planning functions are handled by other organizations in areas where an RDC does not exist. For example, State Laws specifically request that the Minnesota Department of Transportation provide transportation planning for areas not covered by an RDC or MPO. In the Twin Cities Metropolitan area, the Metropolitan Council provides transportation planning at the regional level.

== List of regional development commissions ==
List of RDCs
RDC Name	RDC Number	Headquarters City	Designation Year	Counties
Northwest Regional Development Commission	1	Warren, MN	1973	Kittson, Marshall, Norman, Pennington, Polk, Red Lake, Roseau
Headwaters Regional Development Commission	2	Bemidji, MN	1971	Beltrami, Clearwater, Hubbard, Lake of the Woods, Mahnomen
Arrowhead Regional Development Commission	3	Duluth, MN	1969	Aitkin, Carlton, Cook, Itasca, Koochiching, Lake, St. Louis
West Central Initiative	4	Fergus Falls, MN	1985	Becker, Clay, Douglas, Grant, Otter Tail, Pope, Stevens, Traverse, Wilkin
Region Five Development Commission	5	Staples, MN	1973	Cass, Crow Wing, Morrison, Todd, Wadena
Upper Minnesota Valley Regional Development Commission	6W	Appleton, MN	1973	Chippewa, Big Stone, Yellow Medicine, Lac qui Parle, Big Stone, Swift
Mid-Minnesota Development Commission	6E	Willmar, MN	1973	Kandiyohi, McLeod, Meeker, and Renville
West Central Development Commission (Dissolved in 1982)	7W	Saint Cloud, MN	1973	Kittson, Marshall, Norman, Pennington, Polk, Red Lake, Roseau
East-Central Development Commission	7E	Mora, MN	1973	Chisago, Isanti, Kanabec, Mille Lacs, Pine
Southwest Regional Development Commission	8	Slayton, MN	1973	Cottonowood, Jackson, Lincoln, Lyon, Murray, Nobles, Pipestone, Redwood, Rock
Region Nine Regional Development Commission	9	Mankato, MN	1972	Blue Earth, Brown, Faribault, Le Sueur, Martin, Nicolett, Sibley, Waseca, Watonwan
Southeast Minnesota Regional Development Commission (Non-RDC Area Dissolved in 1982)	10	Rochester, MN	1973	Dodge, Fillmore, Freeborn, Goodhue, Houston, Mower, Olmsted, Rice, Steele, Wabasha, Winona
Metropolitan Council (Non-RDC Area, de facto)	11	Saint Paul, MN	1967	Anoka, Carver, Dakota, Hennepin, Ramsey, Scott, Washington

== See also ==
- Regional planning organization
- Council of governments
- Minnesota
- Urban planning
