= List of political parties in Minnesota =

This article lists political parties in Minnesota.

== History ==
Minnesota has had a history of favoring the Minnesota Democratic–Farmer–Labor Party (DFL) candidates in presidential elections since the party's founding in 1944, and the Democratic candidates since 1932, with only two Republican Party candidates winning Minnesota, Dwight D. Eisenhower and Richard Nixon. The last time Minnesota voted for a Republican presidential candidate was 1972. The DFL won a majority in the Minnesota House of Representatives for the first time since 1996 in the 2006 elections, defeating the Republican majority. Republicans won a majority in both houses of the Minnesota Legislature in the 2010 elections for the first time since 1973 when party designation for state legislators was reinstated, but lost both majorities to the DFL in the 2012 elections. The governorship is held by DFLer Tim Walz.

Minnesota has one of the strongest levels of support among the states for independent and third-party candidates.

=== Third parties ===
The first successful third party in Minnesotan history was the Farmer's Alliance, a progressive agrarian and left-wing populist party that elected members of the legislature, including Speaker of the Minnesota House of Representatives Ezra T. Champlin in 1890. The Alliance was succeeded by the Populist Party, who would elect governor John Lind in 1898 in a fusion ticket with the Minnesota Democratic Party. The Populist party would decline following Lind's failure to win a second term, running its last candidates in 1902.

The Minnesota Farmer–Labor Party, founded in 1918, was a populist political party that managed to elect some of its candidates to the United States Congress, a rare feat among American third political parties. The first third party Governor of Minnesota was Farmer-Laborite Floyd B. Olson, serving from 1931-1936. The party eventually merged with the Minnesota Democratic Party in 1944 to create the Minnesota Democratic–Farmer–Labor Party. The success of the Minnesota Farmer–Labor Party shielded Minnesota from the worst of the restrictive ballot access laws that were passed in most states during the Red Scare era of the 1920s to 1950s. State law governing nominating petitions for third-party candidates and the definition of a major and minor political party have not prevented the rise of more than two major political parties, and have ensured that several different candidates are on the ballot in most state and federal elections.

In 1998, the Reform Party of Minnesota candidate for governor, Jesse Ventura, won the election. The Reform Party later became the Independence Party of Minnesota. In 2002, Sheila Kiscaden, who had previously been a Republican, was re-elected as a member of the Independence Party. The Green Party of Minnesota has had electoral success in city elections, particularly Minneapolis and Saint Paul.

== Recognition ==
Qualifying as a recognized major or minor political party is determined by how many candidates a party nominates for certain partisan offices, how well candidates for statewide office do in certain partisan elections, or a petition that has the required number of signatures. Generally, a party that presents a statewide candidate that receives at least eight percent of the vote or presents a petition to the secretary of state containing a number of signatures equal to at least five percent of the number of individuals who voted in the preceding general election qualifies as a recognized major party. Similarly, the threshold is one percent to qualify as a recognized minor party.

Parties recognized as a major or minor party are eligible to receive funds from the state elections campaign account. Recognized major parties also have automatic ballot access.

== Political parties ==
=== Recognized major parties ===
Party		Ideology	U.S. Congress	State Senate	State House	Executive Offices
Democratic–Farmer–Labor Party	DFL	Liberalism, Progressivism	6 / 10	34 / 67	67 / 134	5 / 5
Republican Party	R	Conservatism, Right-wing populism	4 / 10	33 / 67	67 / 134	0 / 5

=== Recognized minor parties ===
Party		Ideology
Grassroots–Legalize Cannabis Party	G-LCP	Cannabis legalization
Legal Marijuana Now! Party	LMNP	Cannabis legalization
Libertarian Party of Minnesota	L	Libertarianism
Forward-Independence Party (Note: previous known as the Independence Party, Reform Party of Minnesota, and Independence-Alliance Party)	F-I	Classical liberalism Radical centrism

=== Unrecognized minor parties ===
Party		Ideology
Constitution Party of Minnesota	C	Christian right Ultraconservatism
Green Party of Minnesota	G	Green politics
Working Families Party of Minnesota	WFP	Progressivism; Green politics

=== Historical parties ===
Party		Years Active	Ideology	Notes
Minnesota Farmer-Labor Party	F-L	1918-1944	Left-wing populism Progressivism; Social Democracy	Merged with the Minnesota Democratic Party to form the Minnesota DFL
Minnesota Democratic Party	D	1849-1944	Liberalism; Progressivism; Conservatism (pre-1898)	Merged with the Minnesota Farmer-Labor Party to form the Minnesota DFL
Minnesota Progressive Party	MPP	1948-1955	Progressivism	Broke off of the Minnesota DFL
Socialist Party of Minnesota	S	1899-1980s	Socialism	
Farmer's Alliance	FA	1890-1892	Agrarianism; Left-wing populism	Succeeded by the Populist party
Populist Party	PP	1892-1902	Agrarianism; Left-wing populism Progressivism	Merged with the Minnesota Democratic Party
Duluth Union Labor Party	DULP	1887-1920	Georgism	Merged into the Minnesota Farmer-Labor Party

== See also ==
- Cannabis political parties of Minnesota
- Political party strength in Minnesota
