= John E. Boland =

American politician

John E. Boland (August 7, 1937 – September 2, 2015) was an American politician and educator.

Born in Saint Paul, Minnesota, Boland graduated from St. Thomas College and the University of Minnesota. He was a high school teacher and coach. Boland served in the Minnesota House of Representatives from 1971 to 1973 and was a Democrat. In 1973, Boland resigned from the Minnesota State Legislature to serve on the Metropolitan Council as chairman until 1979. Boland was a lobbyist and served as an aide to Congressman Bruce Vento. Boland died in Saint Paul, Minnesota.
