= James L. Hetland Jr. =

American lawyer

James Lyman Hetland, Jr. (1926 - May 23, 2012) was selected to be the founding chair of the Metropolitan Council in 1967 by Gov. Harold LeVander.

He led the Twin cities in a regionalisation effort for the seven-county metro area. One of his major projects in the first years of the Met Council was the placement of the South St. Paul Municipal Airport. At the time, the Metropolitan Airports Commission (MAC) wanted it located in Ham Lake, adjacent to the Carlos Avery Game Farm. The Met Council, under Hetland's leadership, vetoed the location and chose Minneapolis rival St. Paul. His decision was due to the ecologically sensitive nature of the MAC preferred site's surrounding area.

== Biography ==
Hetland joined the Army out of high school and served during World War II. He later earned a law degree from the University of Minnesota Law School, graduating first in his class. He clerked for Supreme Court Justice Thomas F. Gallagher of the Minnesota Supreme Court and then went into private practice.

In addition to serving the Met Council from 1967 to 1971, he was active in many boards and committees. He served as chair of the National Municipal League and the Citizens Forum on Self Governance and had roles in the Advisory Committee on Rules of Civil Procedure of the Minnesota Supreme Court, the Minnesota Zoological Garden, the Minneapolis Charter Commission, The Council on Crime and Justice, and the Minneapolis Downtown Association. He was also a professor at the University of Minnesota Law School and at William Mitchell College of Law.
