= Regional planning =

Land use planning above city or town level

Regional planning deals with the efficient placement of land-use activities, infrastructure, and settlement growth across a larger area of land than an individual city or town. Regional planning is related to urban planning as it relates land use practices on a broader scale. It also includes formulating laws that will guide the efficient planning and management of such regions. Regional planning can be comprehensive by covering various subjects, but it more often specifies a particular subject, which requires region-wide consideration.

Regions require various land uses. Protection of farmland, cities, industrial space, transportation hubs and infrastructure, military bases, and wilderness. Regional planning is the science of efficient placement of infrastructure and zoning for the sustainable growth of a region. Advocates for regional planning such as new urbanists Peter Calthorpe, promote the approach because it can address region-wide environmental, social, and economic issues which may necessarily require a regional focus.

A 'region' in planning terms can be administrative or at least partially functional, and is likely to include a network of settlements and character areas. In most European countries, regional and national plans are 'spatial' directing certain levels of development to specific cities and towns in order to support and manage the region depending on specific needs, for example supporting or resisting polycentrism.

== Nomenclature ==
Although the term "regional planning" is nearly universal in English-speaking countries the areas covered and specific administrative set ups vary widely. In North America, regional planning may encompass more than one state, such as the Regional Plan Association, or a larger conurbation or network of settlements. North American regional planning is likely to cover a much larger area than the Regional Assemblies of the UK; both, however, are equally "regional" in nature.

== Principles ==
Specific interventions and solutions will depend entirely on the needs of each region in each country, but generally speaking, regional planning at the macro level will seek to:

- Resist development in flood plains or along earthquake faults. These areas may be utilised as parks, or unimproved farmland.
- Designate transportation corridors using hubs and spokes and considering major new infrastructure
- Some thought into the various 'role's settlements in the region may play, for example some may be administrative, with others based upon manufacturing or transport.
- Consider designating essential nuisance land uses locations, including waste disposal.
- Designate Green belt land or similar to resist settlement amalgamation and protect the environment.
- Set regional level 'policy' and zoning which encourages a mix of housing values and communities.
- Consider building codes, zoning laws and policies that encourage the best use of the land.
- Allocation of land.

== See also ==
- Urban planning
- Regional planning organization
- Metropolitan planning organization (MPO)
