= Regional planning organization =

A regional planning organization is a government body that guides the development of public and private resources in a manner that ensures public safety, well being and livability. Regional planning organizations take different forms and may also include a metropolitan planning organization or may be part of a multi-state or multi-government association. A regional planning organization develops plans that coordinate planning by groups of local governments and special districts that have common social, political, economic, cultural or other similarities. Generally this process takes the form of urban planning or one of its sub-disciplines such as land use planning, transportation planning, or environmental planning.

Regional planning organizations exist in a variety of different formats. In some areas they are part of another organization such as a regional council of governments. Regional planning organizations are sometimes also called regional development organisations as the need for planning often includes key economic development issues.

== See also ==
- Metropolitan planning organization
- Regional Planning Councils (RPCs), a quasi-governmental body established by the state of Florida
- Regional Development Commissions (RDC), a regional government in the state of Minnesota
- Urban planning
- Regional planning
