= 2010 Minnesota elections =

2010 Minnesota general election
- November 2, 2010
- Turnout: 55.89%

Elections were held in Minnesota on Tuesday, November 2, 2010. Primary elections took place on August 10, 2010.

== Federal ==
=== United States House ===
All eight seats in the United States House of Representatives were up for election in 2010. All eight incumbents sought re-election. Seven incumbents won. Republican Chip Cravaack defeated DFL incumbent Jim Oberstar in Minnesota's 8th congressional district.

=== United States Senate ===
Minnesota's two senators were not up for election in 2010.

== State ==
Statewide offices in Minnesota, including Governor, Lieutenant Governor, Secretary of State, Attorney General, and Auditor were up for election in 2010. All seats in the Minnesota House and Minnesota Senate were also up for election.

=== Governor ===
Incumbent Gov. Tim Pawlenty, a Republican, retired from office after two terms. Former Sen. Mark Dayton, DFL-Minnesota won the election, defeating State Rep. Tom Emmer, R-Delano and activist Tom Horner for the Independence Party.

=== Secretary of State ===
Incumbent DFL Secretary of State Mark Ritchie won re-election after an eventful first term in office, during which he oversaw the very tight election and subsequent recount in the 2008 U.S. Senate race between Al Franken and Norm Coleman.

Ritchie was challenged by State Rep. Dan Severson, R-Sauk Rapids, who was challenged for attempting to be listed on the ballot as Dan "Doc" Severson, in an apparent attempt to tie himself to former Tonight Show bandleader Doc Severinsen. Independence Party candidate Jual Carlson also ran.

=== Attorney General ===
Incumbent DFL Attorney General Lori Swanson won re-election. She was challenged by Republican attorney and psychologist R. Christopher Barden and Independence Party candidate Bill Dahn.

=== State Auditor ===
Incumbent DFL State Auditor Rebecca Otto won re-election. She was challenged by former Republican State Auditor Patricia Anderson, who lost her position to Otto in 2006.

=== State Senate ===
All 67 seats in the Minnesota Senate were up for election in 2010. Republicans won control of the Senate, with 37 seats compared to the DFL's 30. This marked the first time Republicans held a majority in the Senate since the end of the nonpartisan legislative era in 1973.

=== State House of Representatives ===
All 134 seats in the Minnesota House of Representatives were up for election in 2010. After four years of DFL control, Republicans won the majority in the House for the first time since 2007, winning 72 seats. The DFL won 62 seats.

== Local ==
Many elections for county offices were also be held on November 2, 2010.
