= Hubert Humphrey =

Vice President of the United States from 1965 to 1969

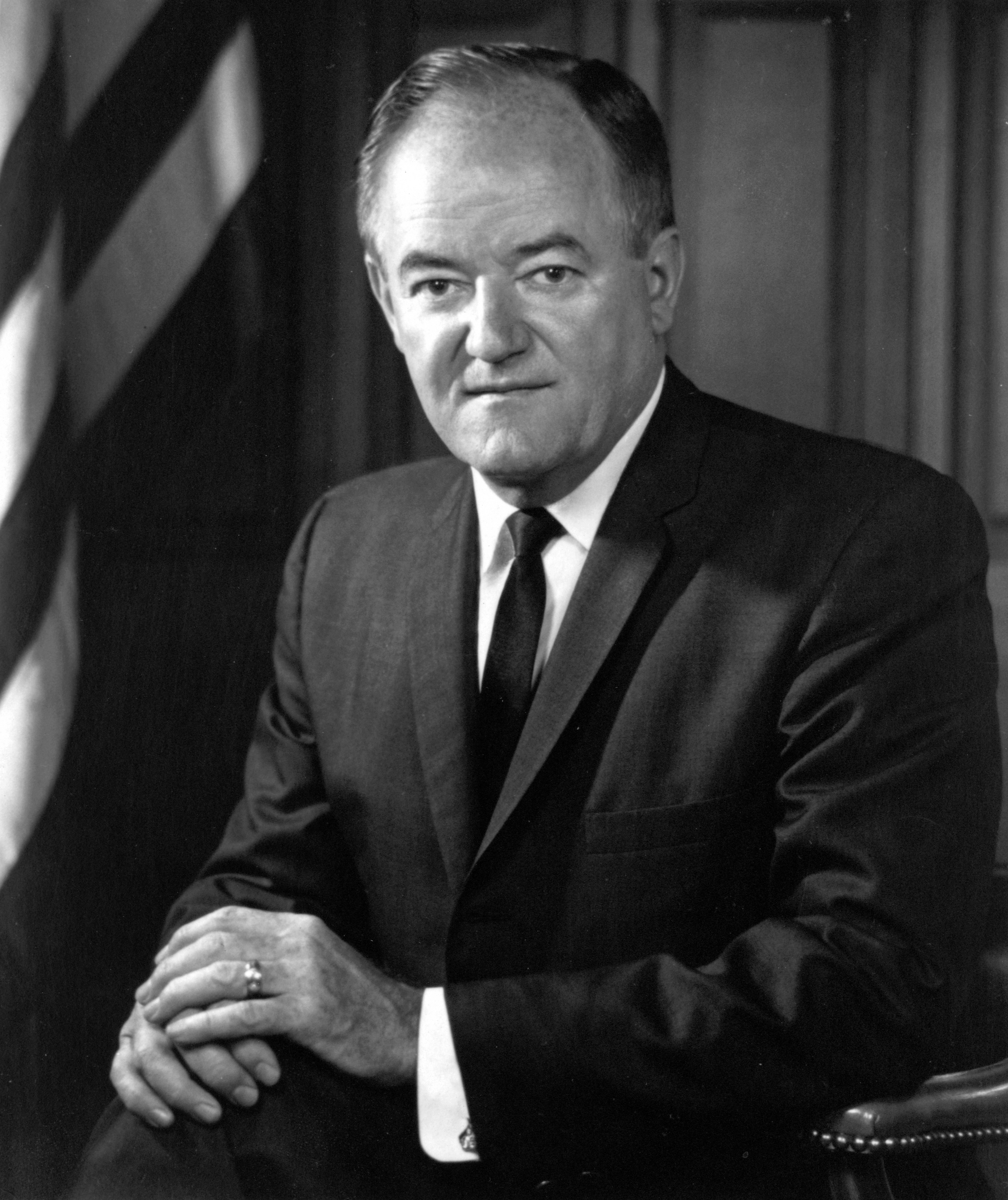
- Official portrait, 1965

38th Vice President of the United States
- In office January 20, 1965 – January 20, 1969
- President: Lyndon B. Johnson
- Preceded by: Lyndon B. Johnson
- Succeeded by: Spiro Agnew

United States Senator from Minnesota
- In office January 3, 1971 – January 13, 1978
- Preceded by: Eugene McCarthy
- Succeeded by: Muriel Humphrey
- In office January 3, 1949 – December 29, 1964
- Preceded by: Joseph H. Ball
- Succeeded by: Walter Mondale
Senate positions
Deputy President pro tempore of the United States Senate
In office January 5, 1977 – January 13, 1978
President	James Eastland
Preceded by	Position established
Succeeded by	George J. Mitchell (1987)
Senate Majority Whip
In office January 3, 1961 – December 29, 1964
Leader	Mike Mansfield
Preceded by	Mike Mansfield
Succeeded by	Russell B. Long

35th Mayor of Minneapolis
- In office July 2, 1945 – November 30, 1948
- Preceded by: Marvin L. Kline
- Succeeded by: Eric G. Hoyer

Personal details
- Born: Hubert Horatio Humphrey Jr. May 27, 1911 Wallace, South Dakota, U.S.
- Died: January 13, 1978 (aged 66) Waverly, Minnesota, U.S.
- Resting place: Lakewood Cemetery
- Party: Democratic (DFL)
- Spouse: Muriel Buck (m. 1936)
- Children: 4, including Skip
- Education: University of Minnesota (BA); Louisiana State University (MA)
- Humphrey's voice Humphrey supporting President Johnson in a campaign advertisement Recorded 1964

Hubert Horatio Humphrey Jr. (May 27, 1911 – January 13, 1978) was an American politician who served from 1965 to 1969 as the 38th vice president of the United States. He twice served in the United States Senate, representing Minnesota from 1949 to 1964 and from 1971 to 1978. As a senator, he was a major leader of modern liberalism in the United States. As President Lyndon B. Johnson's vice president, he supported the controversial Vietnam War. An intensely divided Democratic Party nominated him in the 1968 presidential election, which he narrowly lost to Republican nominee Richard Nixon.

Born in Wallace, South Dakota, Humphrey attended the University of Minnesota. In 1943, he became a professor of political science at Macalester College and ran a failed campaign for mayor of Minneapolis. He helped found the Minnesota Democratic–Farmer–Labor Party (DFL) in 1944; the next year he was elected mayor of Minneapolis, serving until 1948 and co-founding the left-wing non-communist group Americans for Democratic Action in 1947. In 1948, he was elected to the U.S. Senate and successfully advocated for the inclusion of a proposal to end racial segregation in the 1948 Democratic National Convention's party platform.

Humphrey served three terms in the Senate from 1949 to 1964, and was the Senate Majority Whip for the last four years of his tenure. During this time, he was the lead author of the Civil Rights Act of 1964, introduced the first initiative to create the Peace Corps, and chaired the Select Committee on Disarmament. He unsuccessfully sought his party's presidential nomination in 1952 and 1960. After Lyndon B. Johnson acceded to the presidency, he chose Humphrey as his running mate, and the Democratic ticket won a landslide victory in the 1964 election.

In March 1968, Johnson made his surprise announcement that he would not seek reelection, and Humphrey launched his campaign for the presidency. Loyal to the Johnson administration's policies on the Vietnam War, he was opposed by many within his party and avoided the primaries to focus on winning the delegates of non-primary states at the Democratic National Convention. His delegate strategy succeeded in clinching the nomination, and he chose Senator Edmund Muskie as his running mate. In the general election, he nearly matched Nixon's tally in the popular vote but lost the electoral vote by a wide margin. After the defeat, he returned to the Senate and served from 1971 until his death in 1978. He ran again in the 1972 Democratic primaries but lost to George McGovern and declined to be McGovern's running mate. From 1977 to 1978, he served as the deputy president pro tempore of the United States Senate.

== Early life and education ==
Hubert Horatio Humphrey Jr. was born in a room over his father's drugstore in Wallace, South Dakota. He was the son of Ragnild Kristine Sannes (1883–1973), a Norwegian immigrant, and Hubert Horatio Humphrey Sr. (1882–1949). His paternal ancestors migrated from England to the Massachusetts Bay Colony around 1648. Humphrey spent most of his youth in Doland, South Dakota, on the Dakota prairie; the town's population was about 600. His father was a licensed pharmacist and merchant who served as mayor and a town council member. The father also served briefly in the South Dakota state legislature and was a South Dakota delegate to the 1944 and 1948 Democratic National Conventions. In the late 1920s, a severe economic downturn hit Doland; both banks in the town closed and Humphrey's father struggled to keep his store open.

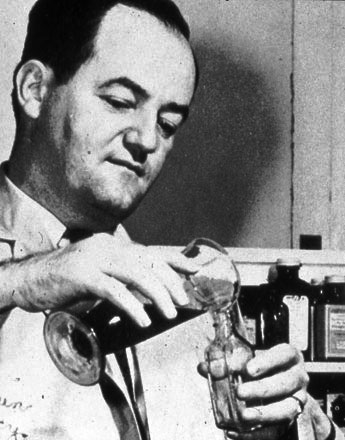
Humphrey practicing pharmacy in his father's drugstore

After his son graduated from Doland's high school, Hubert Sr. left Doland and opened a new drugstore in the larger town of Huron, South Dakota (population 11,000), where he hoped to improve his fortunes. Because of the family's financial struggles, Humphrey had to leave the University of Minnesota after just one year. He earned a pharmacist's license from the Capitol College of Pharmacy in Denver, Colorado (completing a two-year licensure program in just six months), and helped his father run his store from 1931 to 1937. Both father and son were innovative in finding ways to attract customers: "to supplement their business, the Humphreys had become manufacturers ... of patent medicines for both hogs and humans. A sign featuring a wooden pig was hung over the drugstore to tell the public about this unusual service. Farmers got the message, and it was Humphrey's that became known as the farmer's drugstore." One biographer noted, "while Hubert Jr. minded the store and stirred the concoctions in the basement, Hubert Sr. went on the road selling 'Humphrey's BTV' (Body Tone Veterinary), a mineral supplement and dewormer for hogs, and 'Humphrey's Chest Oil' and 'Humphrey's Sniffles' for two-legged sufferers." Humphrey later wrote, "we made 'Humphrey's Sniffles', a substitute for Vick's Nose Drops. I felt ours were better. Vick's used mineral oil, which is not absorbent, and we used a vegetable-oil base, which was. I added benzocaine, a local anesthetic, so that even if the sniffles didn't get better, you felt it less." The various "Humphrey cures ... worked well enough and constituted an important part of the family income ... the farmers that bought the medicines were good customers." Over time Humphrey's Drug Store became a profitable enterprise and the family again prospered. While living in Huron, Humphrey regularly attended Huron's largest Methodist church and became scoutmaster of the church's Boy Scout Troop 6. He "started basketball games in the church basement ... although his scouts had no money for camp in 1931, Hubert found a way in the worst of that summer's dust-storm grit, grasshoppers, and depression to lead an overnight [outing]."

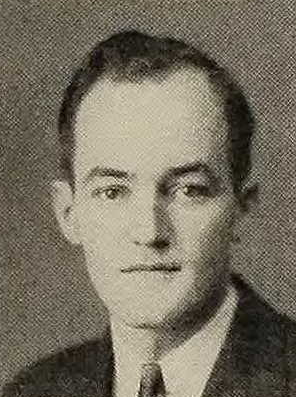
Humphrey in the University of Minnesota yearbook, 1939

Humphrey did not enjoy working as a pharmacist, and continued to desire a doctorate in political science and become a college professor. His unhappiness was manifested in "stomach pains and fainting spells", though doctors could find nothing wrong with him. In August 1937, he told his father that he wanted to return to the University of Minnesota. Hubert Sr. tried to convince his son not to leave by offering him a full partnership in the store, but Hubert Jr. refused and told his father "how depressed I was, almost physically ill from the work, the dust storms, the conflict between my desire to do something and be somebody and my loyalty to him ... he replied 'Hubert, if you aren't happy, then you ought to do something about it'." Humphrey returned to the University of Minnesota to complete his degree, graduating magna cum laude with a Bachelor of Arts in political science and earning Phi Beta Kappa distinction in 1939. During his time at the University of Minnesota, Humphrey—who grew up in a predominantly white, rural environment—became aware of the antisemitism and racial discrimination prevalent in Minneapolis, which biographers note influenced his subsequent focus on civil rights advocacy. He was a member of Phi Delta Chi, a pharmacy fraternity. He also earned a master's degree from Louisiana State University in 1940, serving as an assistant instructor of political science there.

He then became an instructor and doctoral student at the University of Minnesota from 1940 to 1941 (joining the American Federation of Teachers), and was a supervisor for the Works Progress Administration (WPA). Humphrey was a star on the university's debate team; one of his teammates was future Minnesota Governor and US Secretary of Agriculture Orville Freeman. In the 1940 presidential campaign Humphrey and future University of Minnesota president Malcolm Moos debated the merits of Franklin D. Roosevelt, the Democratic nominee, and Wendell Willkie, the Republican nominee, on a Minneapolis radio station. Humphrey supported Roosevelt. Humphrey soon became active in Minneapolis politics, and as a result never finished his PhD.

== Marriage and early career ==
In 1934, Humphrey began dating Muriel Buck, a bookkeeper and graduate of local Huron College. They were married from 1936 until Humphrey's death nearly 42 years later. They had four children: Nancy Faye, Skip Humphrey, Robert Andrew, and Douglas Sannes. Money was an issue that plagued the Humphreys consistently. One biographer noted, "For much of his life he was short of money to live on, and his relentless drive to attain the White House seemed at times like one long, losing struggle to raise enough campaign funds to get there." To help boost his salary, Humphrey frequently took paid outside speaking engagements. Through most of his years as a U.S. senator and vice president, he lived in a middle-class suburban housing development in Chevy Chase, Maryland. In 1958, the Humphreys used their savings and his speaking fees to build a lakefront home in Waverly, Minnesota, about 40 miles west of Minneapolis.

During World War II, Humphrey tried three times to join the armed forces but failed. His first two attempts were to join the Navy, first as a commissioned officer and then as an enlisted man. He was rejected both times for color blindness. He then tried to enlist in the Army in December 1944 but failed the physical exam because of a double hernia, color blindness, and calcification of the lungs. Despite his attempts to join the military, one biographer would note that "all through his political life, Humphrey was dogged by the charge that he was a draft dodger" during the war.

Humphrey led various wartime government agencies and worked as a college instructor. In 1942, he was the state director of new production training and reemployment and chief of the Minnesota war service program. In 1943 he was the assistant director of the War Manpower Commission. From 1943 to 1944, Humphrey was a professor of political science at Macalester College in Saint Paul, Minnesota, where he headed the university's recently created international debate department, which focused on the international politics of World War II and the creation of the United Nations. After leaving Macalester in the spring of 1944, Humphrey worked as a news commentator for a Minneapolis radio station until 1945.

In 1943, Humphrey made his first run for elective office, for mayor of Minneapolis. He lost, but his poorly funded campaign still captured over 47% of the vote. In 1944, Humphrey was one of the key players in the merger of the Democratic and Farmer-Labor parties of Minnesota to form the Minnesota Democratic-Farmer-Labor Party (DFL). He also worked on President Roosevelt's 1944 reelection campaign. When Minnesota Communists tried to seize control of the new party in 1945, Humphrey became an engaged anticommunist and led the successful fight to oust the Communists from the DFL.

== Mayor of Minneapolis (1945–1948) ==
After the war, Humphrey again ran for mayor of Minneapolis; this time, he won the June 1945 general election with 61% of the vote. As mayor, he helped ensure the appointment of a friend and previous neighbor, Edwin Ryan, as head of the police department, as he needed a "police chief whose integrity and loyalty would be above reproach." Though they had differing views of labor unions, Ryan and Humphrey worked together to crack down on crime in Minneapolis. Humphrey told Ryan, "I want this town cleaned up and I mean I want it cleaned up now, not a year from now or a month from now, right now", and "You take care of the law enforcement. I'll take care of the politics." Humphrey served as mayor from 1945 to 1948, winning reelection in 1947 by the largest margin in the city's history to that time. Humphrey gained national fame by becoming one of the founders of the liberal anticommunist Americans for Democratic Action (ADA), and he served as chairman from 1949 to 1950. He also reformed the Minneapolis police force. The city had been named the "antisemitism capital" of the country, and its small African-American population also faced discrimination. Humphrey's mayoralty is noted for his efforts to fight all forms of bigotry. He formed the Council on Human Relations and established a municipal version of the Fair Employment Practice Committee, making Minneapolis one of only a few cities in the United States to prohibit racial discrimination in the workforce. Humphrey and his publicists were proud that the Council on Human Relations brought together individuals of varying ideologies. In 1960, Humphrey told journalist Theodore H. White, "I was mayor once, in Minneapolis ... a mayor is a fine job, it's the best job there is between being a governor and being the President."

A 1993 survey of historians, political scientists and urban experts by Melvin G. Holli of the University of Illinois at Chicago ranked Humphrey as the 28th-best American big-city mayor to have served between 1820 and 1993.

== 1948 DNC involvement ==
The Democratic Party of 1948 was split between those, mainly Northerners, who thought the federal government should actively protect civil rights for racial minorities, and those, mainly Southerners, who believed that states should be able to enforce racial segregation within their borders.

At the 1948 Democratic National Convention, the party platform reflected the division by containing only platitudes supporting civil rights. The incumbent president, Harry S. Truman, had shelved most of his 1946 Commission on Civil Rights's recommendations to avoid angering Southern Democrats. But Humphrey had written in The Progressive magazine, "The Democratic Party must lead the fight for every principle in the report. It is all or nothing."

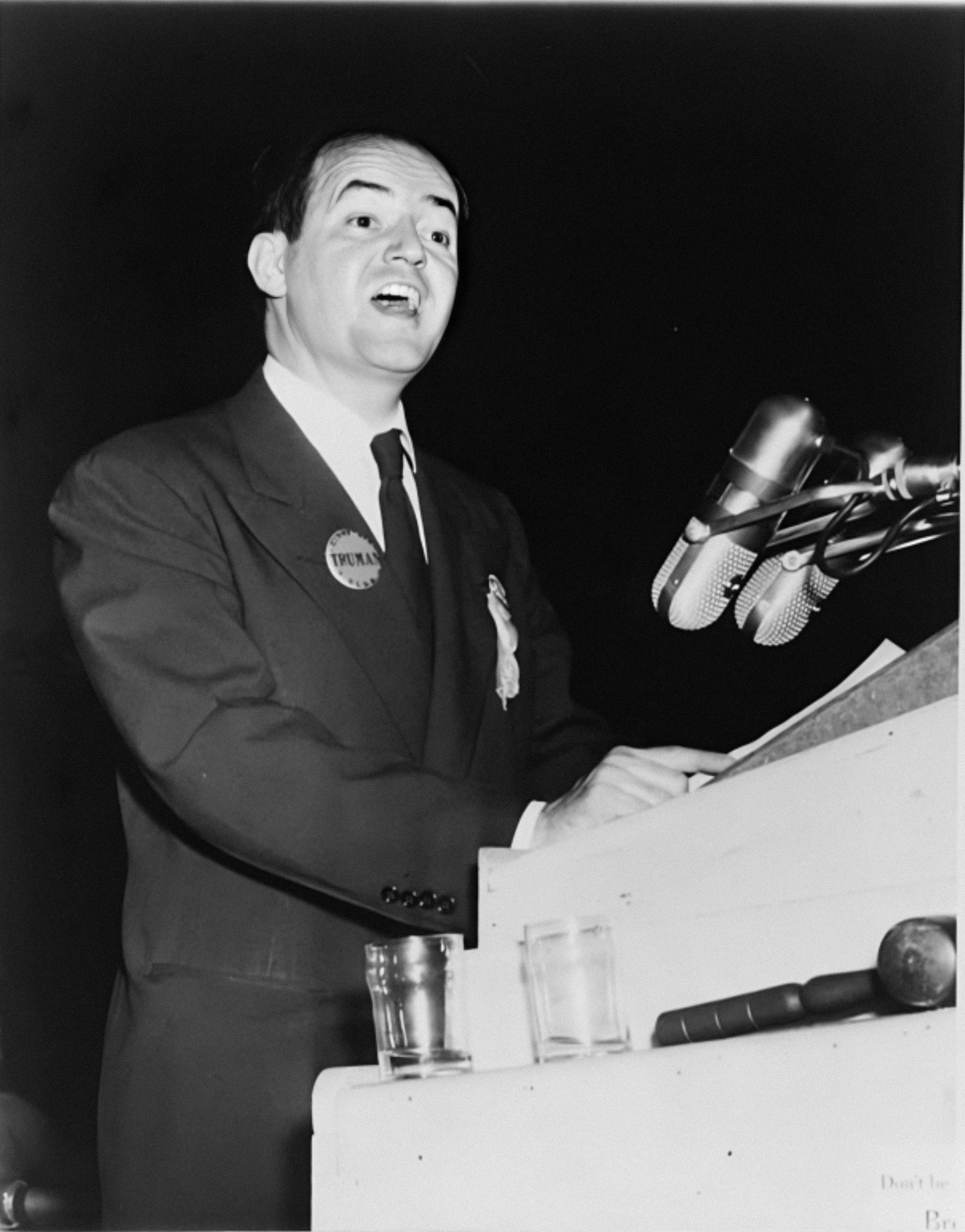
Humphrey at the 1948 Democratic National Convention in Philadelphia

A diverse coalition opposed the convention's tepid civil rights platform, including anticommunist liberals like Humphrey, Paul Douglas and John F. Shelley, all of whom would later become known as leading progressives in the Democratic Party. They proposed adding a "minority plank" to the party platform that would commit the Democratic Party to more aggressive opposition to racial segregation. The minority plank called for federal legislation against lynching, an end to legalized school segregation in the South, and ending job discrimination based on skin color. Also strongly backing the minority plank were Democratic urban bosses like Ed Flynn of the Bronx, who promised the votes of northeastern delegates to Humphrey's platform, Jacob Arvey of Chicago, and David Lawrence of Pittsburgh. Although seen as conservatives, the urban bosses believed that Northern Democrats could gain many black votes by supporting civil rights, with only comparatively small losses from Southern Democrats. Although many scholars have suggested that labor unions were leading figures in this coalition, no significant labor leaders attended the convention, except for the heads of the Congress of Industrial Organizations Political Action Committee (CIO-PAC), Jack Kroll and A.F. Whitney.

Despite Truman's aides' aggressive pressure to avoid forcing the issue on the Convention floor, Humphrey spoke for the minority plank. In a renowned speech, Humphrey passionately told the convention, "To those who say, my friends, to those who say that we are rushing this issue of civil rights, I say to them we are 172 years (too) late! To those who say this civil rights program is an infringement on states' rights, I say this: the time has arrived in America for the Democratic Party to get out of the shadow of states' rights and walk forthrightly into the bright sunshine of human rights!" Humphrey and his allies succeeded: the convention adopted the pro-civil-rights plank by a vote of 651 1/2 to 582 1/2.

After the convention's vote, the Mississippi delegation and half of the Alabama delegation walked out of the hall. Many Southern Democrats were so enraged at this affront to their "way of life" that they formed the Dixiecrat party and nominated their own presidential candidate, Governor Strom Thurmond of South Carolina. The Dixiecrats' goal was to take Southern states away from Truman and thus cause his defeat. They reasoned that after such a defeat, the national Democratic Party would never again aggressively pursue a pro-civil rights agenda. The move backfired: although the civil rights plank cost Truman the Dixiecrats' support, a significant number of black voters switched their support from Henry A. Wallace to him. As a result, Truman defeated Thurmond and the Republican nominee, Thomas E. Dewey. The result demonstrated that the Democratic Party could win presidential elections without the "Solid South" and weakened Southern Democrats. Pulitzer Prize-winning historian David McCullough has written that Humphrey probably did more to get Truman elected in 1948 than anyone other than Truman himself.

== United States Senate (1949–1964) ==
Humphrey was elected to the United States Senate in 1948 on the DFL ticket, defeating James M. Shields in the DFL primary with 89% of the vote, and unseating incumbent Republican Joseph H. Ball in the general election with 60% of the vote. He took office on January 3, 1949, becoming the first Democrat elected senator from Minnesota since before the Civil War. Humphrey wrote that the victory heightened his sense of self, as he had beaten the odds of defeating a Republican with statewide support. Humphrey's father died that year, and Humphrey stopped using the "Jr." suffix on his name. He was reelected in 1954 and 1960. His colleagues selected him as majority whip in 1961, a position he held until he left the Senate on December 29, 1964, to assume the vice presidency. Humphrey served from the 81st to the 87th sessions of Congress, and in a portion of the 88th Congress.

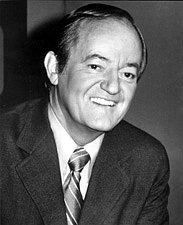
Senator Humphrey

Initially, Humphrey's support of civil rights led to his being ostracized by Southern Democrats, who dominated Senate leadership positions and wanted to punish him for proposing the civil rights platform at the 1948 Convention. Senator Richard Russell Jr. of Georgia, a leader of Southern Democrats, once remarked to other senators as Humphrey walked by, "Can you imagine the people of Minnesota sending that damn fool down here to represent them?" Humphrey was reportedly "crushed", so hurt by the remark that he broke into tears while driving home. But he refused to be intimidated and stood his ground; his integrity, passion and eloquence eventually earned him the respect of even most of the Southerners. The Southerners were also more inclined to accept Humphrey after he became a protégé of Senate Majority Leader Lyndon B. Johnson of Texas. Humphrey became known for his advocacy of liberal causes (such as civil rights, arms control, a nuclear test ban, food stamps, and humanitarian foreign aid), and for his long and witty speeches.

Humphrey was a liberal leader who fought to uphold Truman's veto of the McCarran Act of 1950. The bill was designed to suppress the American Communist Party. With a small group of liberals he supported the Kilgore substitute that would allow the president to lock up subversives, without trial, in a time of national emergency. The model was the internment of West Coast Japanese in 1942. The goal was to split the McCarran coalition. For years critics charged that Humphrey supported concentration camps. The ploy failed to stop the new law; the Senate voted 57 to 10 to overturn Truman's veto. In 1954 he proposed to make membership in the Communist Party a felony. It was another ploy to derail a bill that would hurt labor unions. Humphrey's proposal did not pass.

Humphrey was the author of the first humane slaughter bill introduced in the U.S. Congress and chief Senate sponsor of the Humane Slaughter Act of 1958.

Humphrey chaired the Select Committee on Disarmament (84th and 85th Congresses). In February 1960 he introduced a bill to establish a National Peace Agency. With another former pharmacist, Representative Carl Durham, Humphrey cosponsored the Durham-Humphrey Amendment, which amended the Federal Food, Drug, and Cosmetic Act, defining two specific categories for medications, legend (prescription) and over-the-counter (OTC).

As Democratic whip in the Senate in 1964, Humphrey was instrumental in the passage of the Civil Rights Act that year. He was a lead author of its text, alongside Senate Republican Minority Leader Everett Dirksen of Illinois. Humphrey's consistently cheerful and upbeat demeanor, and his forceful advocacy of liberal causes, led him to be nicknamed "The Happy Warrior" by many of his Senate colleagues and political journalists.

Humphrey introduced the first bill to create the Peace Corps in 1957—three years before John F. Kennedy's proposal. In 1969, three journalists wrote of Humphrey that "few men in American politics have achieved so much of lasting significance. It was Humphrey, not Senator [Everett] Dirksen, who played the crucial part in the complex parliamentary games that were needed to pass the Civil Rights Act of 1964. It was Humphrey, not John Kennedy, who first proposed the Peace Corps. The Food for Peace program was Humphrey's idea, and so was Medicare, passed sixteen years after he first proposed it. He worked for Federal aid to education from 1949, and for a nuclear-test ban treaty from 1956. These are the solid monuments of twenty years of effective work for liberal causes in the Senate." President Johnson once said, "Most Senators are minnows ... Hubert Humphrey is among the whales." In his autobiography, The Education of a Public Man, Humphrey wrote:

There were three bills of particular emotional importance to me: the Peace Corps, a disarmament agency, and the Nuclear Test Ban Treaty. The President, knowing how I felt, asked me to introduce legislation for all three. I introduced the first Peace Corps bill in 1957. It did not meet with much enthusiasm. Some traditional diplomats quaked at the thought of thousands of young Americans scattered across their world. Many senators, including liberal ones, thought the idea was silly and unworkable. Now, with a young president urging its passage, it became possible and we pushed it rapidly through the Senate. It is fashionable now to suggest that Peace Corps Volunteers gained as much or more, from their experience as the countries they worked. That may be true, but it ought not demean their work. They touched many lives and made them better.

On April 9, 1950, Humphrey predicted that President Truman would sign a $4 billion housing bill and charge Republicans with having removed the bill's main middle-income benefits during Truman's tours of the Midwest and Northwest the following month.

On January 7, 1951, Humphrey joined Senator Paul Douglas in calling for an $80 billion federal budget to combat Communist aggression along with a stiff tax increase to prevent borrowing.

In a January 1951 letter to President Truman, Humphrey wrote of the necessity of a commission akin to the Fair Employment Practices Commission that would be used to end discrimination in defense industries and predicted that establishing such a commission by executive order would be met with high approval by Americans.

On June 18, 1953, Humphrey introduced a resolution calling for the US to urge free elections in East Germany in response to the recent anti-communist uprising there.

In December 1958, after receiving a message from Nikita Khrushchev during a visit to the Soviet Union, Humphrey returned insisting that the message was not negative toward America. In February 1959, Humphrey said American newspapers should have ignored Khrushchev's comments calling him a purveyor of fairy tales. In a September address to the National Stationery and Office Equipment Association, Humphrey called for further inspection of Khrushchev's "live and let live" doctrine and maintained the Cold War could be won by using American "weapons of peace".

In June 1963, Humphrey accompanied his longtime friend labor leader Walter Reuther on a trip to Harpsund, the Swedish Prime Minister's summer country retreat, to meet with European socialist leaders for an exchange of ideas. Among the European leaders who met with Humphrey and Reuther were the prime ministers of Britain, Sweden, Denmark, and Norway, as well as future German chancellor Willy Brandt.

== Political ambitions (1952–1964) ==
In the 1960 primaries, Humphrey won South Dakota and Washington, D.C.

Humphrey ran for the Democratic presidential nomination twice before his election to the vice presidency in 1964. The first time was as Minnesota's favorite son in 1952; he received only 26 votes on the first ballot. The second time was in 1960. In between these two bids, Humphrey was part of the free-for-all for the vice-presidential nomination at the 1956 Democratic National Convention, where he received 134.5 votes on the first ballot and 74.5 on the second.

In 1960, Humphrey ran for the nomination against fellow Senator John F. Kennedy in the primaries. Their first meeting was in the Wisconsin primary, where Kennedy's well-organized and well-funded campaign overcame Humphrey's energetic but poorly funded effort. Humphrey believed defeating Kennedy in Wisconsin would weaken and slow the momentum of the latter's campaign. Kennedy's attractive brothers, sisters, and wife Jacqueline combed the state for votes. At one point Humphrey memorably complained that he "felt like an independent merchant competing against a chain store". Humphrey later wrote in his memoirs that "Muriel and I and our 'plain folks' entourage were no match for the glamour of Jackie Kennedy and the other Kennedy women, for Peter Lawford ... and Frank Sinatra singing their commercial 'High Hopes'. Jack Kennedy brought family and Hollywood to Wisconsin. The people loved it, and the press ate it up." Kennedy won the Wisconsin primary, but by a smaller margin than anticipated. Some commentators argued that Kennedy's victory margin had come almost entirely from areas with large Roman Catholic populations, and that Protestants had supported Humphrey. As a result, Humphrey refused to quit the race and decided to run against Kennedy again in the West Virginia primary. According to one biographer, "Humphrey thought his chances were good in West Virginia, one of the few states that had backed him in his losing race for vice-president four years earlier ... West Virginia was more rural than urban, [which] seemed to invite Humphrey's folksy stump style. The state, moreover, was a citadel of labor. It was depressed; unemployment had hit hard; and coal miners' families were hungry. Humphrey felt he could talk to such people, who were 95% Protestant (Humphrey was a Congregationalist) and deep-dyed Bible-belters besides."

Kennedy chose to meet the religion issue head-on. In radio broadcasts, he carefully redefined the issue from Catholic versus Protestant to tolerance versus intolerance. Kennedy's appeal placed Humphrey, who had championed tolerance his entire career, on the defensive, and Kennedy attacked him with a vengeance. Franklin D. Roosevelt Jr., the son of the former president, stumped for Kennedy in West Virginia and raised the issue of Humphrey's failure to serve in the armed forces in World War II. Roosevelt told audiences, "I don't know where he [Humphrey] was in World War Two," and handed out flyers charging that Humphrey was a draft dodger. Historian Robert Dallek has written that Robert F. Kennedy, who was serving as his brother's campaign manager, came into "possession of information that Humphrey may have sought military deferments during World War Two ... he pressed Roosevelt to use this." Humphrey believed Roosevelt's draft-dodger claim "had been approved by Bobby [Kennedy], if not Jack". The claims that Humphrey was a draft dodger were inaccurate, because during the war Humphrey had "tried and failed to get into the [military] service because of physical disabilities". After the West Virginia primary, Roosevelt sent Humphrey a written apology and retraction. According to historian Arthur Schlesinger, Jr., Roosevelt "felt that he had been used, blaming [the draft-dodger charge] on Robert Kennedy's determination to win at any cost ... Roosevelt said later that it was the biggest political mistake of his career."

Short on funds, Humphrey could not match the well-financed Kennedy operation. He traveled around the state in a rented bus while Kennedy and his staff flew in a large, family-owned airplane. According to his biographer Carl Solberg, Humphrey spent only $23,000 on the West Virginia primary while Kennedy's campaign privately spent $1.5 million, well over their official estimate of $100,000. Unproven accusations claimed that the Kennedys had bought the West Virginia primary by bribing county sheriffs and other local officials to give Kennedy the vote. Humphrey later wrote, "as a professional politician I was able to accept and indeed respect the efficacy of the Kennedy campaign. But underneath the beautiful exterior, there was an element of ruthlessness and toughness that I had trouble either accepting or forgetting." Kennedy defeated Humphrey soundly in West Virginia with 60.8% of the vote. That evening, Humphrey announced that he was leaving the race. By winning West Virginia, Kennedy overcame the belief that Protestant voters would not elect a Catholic to the presidency and thus sewed up the Democratic nomination.

Humphrey won the South Dakota and District of Columbia primaries, which Kennedy did not enter. At the 1960 Democratic National Convention, he received 41 votes even though he was no longer a candidate.

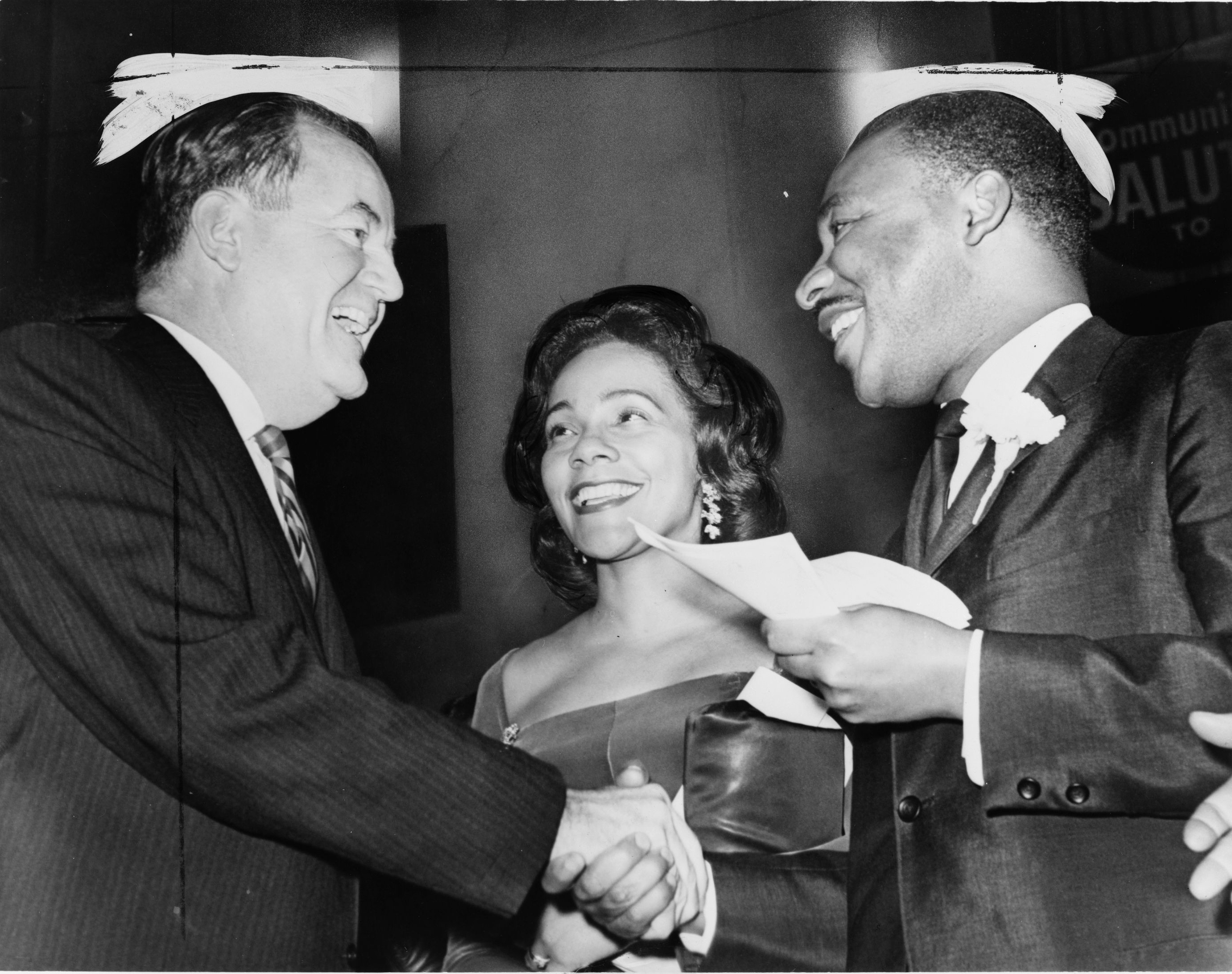
Vice President-elect Humphrey alongside Coretta Scott King and civil rights leader Dr. Martin Luther King Jr. in 1964.

=== Vice presidential campaign ===
Humphrey's defeat in 1960 had a profound influence on his thinking; after the primaries he told friends that, as a relatively poor man in politics, he was unlikely to ever become president unless he served as vice president first. Humphrey believed that only in this way could he attain the funds, nationwide organization, and visibility he would need to win the Democratic nomination. So as the 1964 presidential campaign began, Humphrey made clear his interest in becoming Lyndon Johnson's running mate. At the 1964 Democratic National Convention, Johnson kept the three likely vice-presidential candidates, Connecticut Senator Thomas Dodd, fellow Minnesota Senator Eugene McCarthy, and Humphrey, as well as the rest of the nation, in suspense before announcing his choice of Humphrey with much fanfare, praising his qualifications at considerable length before announcing his name.

The following day Humphrey's acceptance speech overshadowed Johnson's own acceptance address:

Hubert warmed up with a long tribute to the President, then hit his stride as he began a rhythmic jabbing and chopping at Barry Goldwater. "Most Democrats and Republicans in the Senate voted for an $11.5 billion tax cut for American citizens and American business," he cried, "but not Senator Goldwater. Most Democrats and Republicans in the Senate – in fact four-fifths of the members of his own party – voted for the Civil Rights Act, but not Senator Goldwater." Time after time, he capped his indictments with the drumbeat cry: "But not Senator Goldwater!" The delegates caught the cadence and took up the chant. A quizzical smile spread across Humphrey's face, then turned to a laugh of triumph. Hubert was in fine form. He knew it. The delegates knew it. And no one could deny that Hubert Humphrey would be a formidable political antagonist in the weeks ahead.

In an address before labor leaders in Youngstown, Ohio, on September 7, 1964, Humphrey said the labor movement had "more at stake in this election than almost any other segment of society". In Jamesburg, New Jersey, on September 10, Humphrey remarked that Goldwater had a "record of retreat and reaction" when it came to issues of urban housing. During a September 12 Denver Democratic rally, Humphrey charged Goldwater with having rejected programs that most Americans and members of his own party supported. At a Santa Fe September 13 rally, Humphrey said the Goldwater-led Republican Party was seeking "to divide America so that they may conquer" and that Goldwater would pinch individuals in his reduction of government. On September 16, Humphrey said the Americans for Democratic Action supported the Johnson administration's economic sanctions against Cuba, and that the organization wanted to see a free Cuban government. The following day in San Antonio, Texas, Humphrey said Goldwater opposed programs favored by most Texans and Americans. During a September 27 appearance in Cleveland, Ohio, Humphrey said the Kennedy administration had led America in a prosperous direction and called for voters to issue a referendum with their vote against "those who seek to replace the Statue of Liberty with an iron-padlocked gate." At an October 1 rally in Tacoma, Washington, Humphrey attacked Goldwater as a radical who opposed the 1960 GOP platform and true conservatism, which in Humphrey's opinion meant a balance of tradition and progress.

At Shrine Auditorium in Los Angeles, California, on October 2, Humphrey said the general election would give voters a choice between his running mate and a candidate "who curses the darkness and never lights a candle". During an October 9 Jersey City, New Jersey, appearance, Humphrey responded to critics of the administration, who he called "sick and tired Americans", by touting the accomplishments of both Kennedy's and Johnson's presidencies. In Tampa, Florida, on October 18, a week after the resignation of Walter Jenkins amid a scandal, Humphrey said he was unaware of any potential security leaks relating to the case. In Minneapolis on October 24, Humphrey listed the censure vote toward Senator Joseph McCarthy, the civil rights bill, and the nuclear test ban treaty as "three great issues of conscience to come before the United States Senate in the past decade" that Goldwater had voted incorrectly on as a Senator. In an October 26 speech in Chicago, Humphrey called Goldwater "neither a Republican nor a Democrat" and "a radical".

The Johnson-Humphrey ticket won the election overwhelmingly, with 486 electoral votes out of 538. Only five Southern states and Goldwater's home state of Arizona supported the Republican ticket. In October Humphrey had predicted that the ticket would win by a large margin but not carry every state.

=== Vice President-elect of the United States ===
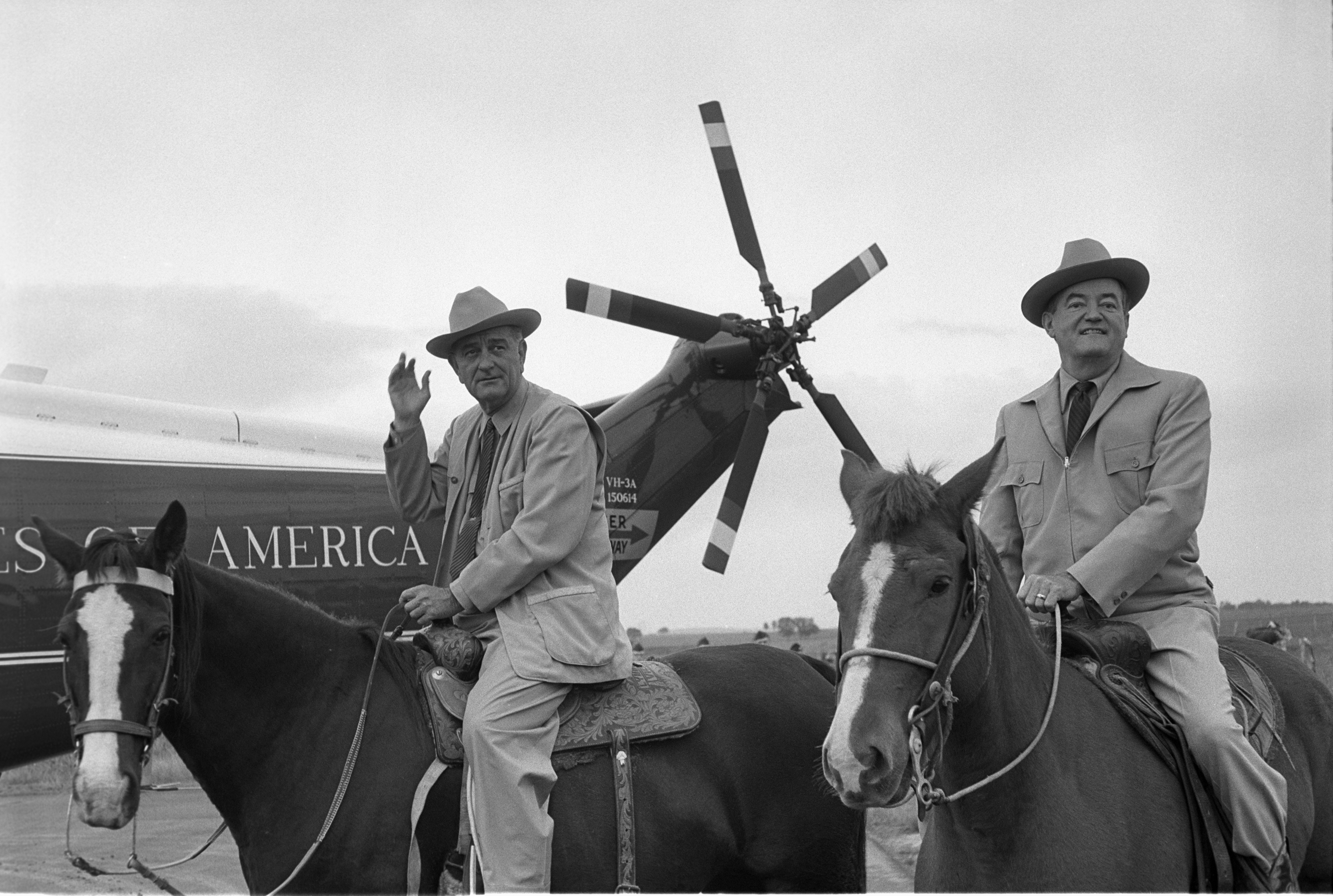
Humphrey (right) horse-riding with President Johnson (left) at the LBJ ranch, c. November 4, 1964

Soon after winning the election, Humphrey and Johnson went to LBJ ranch near Stonewall, Texas. On November 6, 1964, Humphrey traveled to the Virgin Islands for a two-week vacation. News stations aired taped remarks in which Humphrey stated that he had not discussed with Johnson what his role would be as vice president and that national campaigns should be reduced by four weeks. In a November 20 interview, Humphrey announced he would resign his Senate seat midway through the next month so that Walter Mondale could assume the position.

On December 10, 1964, Humphrey met with Johnson in the Oval Office, the latter charging the vice president-elect with "developing a publicity machine extraordinaire and of always wanting to get his name in the paper." Johnson showed Humphrey a George Reed memo with the allegation that the president would die within six months from an already acquired fatal heart disease. The same day, during a speech in Washington, Johnson announced Humphrey would have the position of giving assistance to governmental civil rights programs.

On January 19, 1965, the day before the inauguration, Humphrey told the Democratic National Committee that the party had unified because of the national consensus established by the presidential election.

== Vice presidency (1965–1969) ==
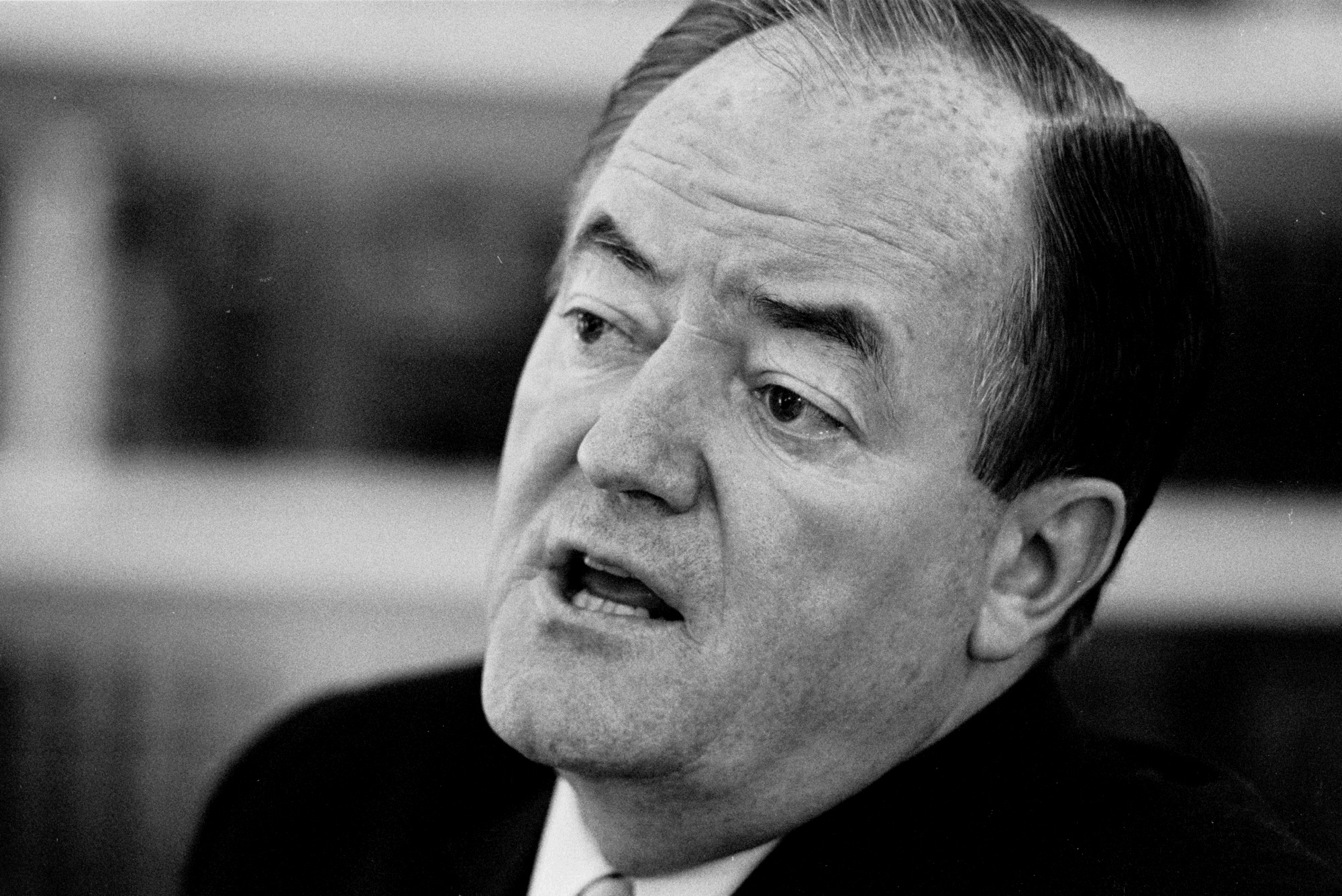
Vice President Humphrey at a meeting in the Oval Office, c. June 21, 1965

Humphrey took office on January 20, 1965, ending the 14-month vacancy of the vice president of the United States, which had remained empty when then-Vice President Lyndon B. Johnson assumed the presidency after the assassination of John F. Kennedy in November 1963. He was an early skeptic of the then growing Vietnam War. Following a successful Viet Cong hit-and-run attack on a U.S. military installation at Pleiku on February 7, 1965 (where 7 Americans were killed and 109 wounded), Humphrey returned from Georgia to Washington D.C., to attempt to prevent further escalation. He told President Johnson that bombing North Vietnam was not a solution to the problems in South Vietnam, but that bombing would require the injection of US ground forces into South Vietnam to protect the airbases. Presciently, he noted that a military solution in Vietnam would take several years, well beyond the next election cycle. In response to this advice, President Johnson punished Humphrey by treating him coldly and restricting him from his inner circle for a number of months, until Humphrey decided to "get back on the team" and fully support the war effort.

As vice president, Humphrey was criticized for his complete and vocal loyalty to Johnson and the policies of the Johnson administration, even as many of his liberal admirers opposed the president's policies with increasing fervor regarding the Vietnam War. Many of Humphrey's liberal friends and allies abandoned him because of his refusal to publicly criticize Johnson's Vietnam War policies. Humphrey's critics later learned that Johnson had threatened Humphrey – Johnson told Humphrey that if he publicly criticized his policies, he would destroy Humphrey's chances to become president by opposing his nomination at the next Democratic Convention. However, Humphrey's critics were vocal and persistent: even his nickname, "the Happy Warrior", was used against him. The nickname referred not to his military hawkishness, but rather to his crusading for social welfare and civil rights programs. After his narrow defeat in the 1968 presidential election, Humphrey wrote that "After four years as Vice-President ... I had lost some of my personal identity and personal forcefulness. ... I ought not to have let a man [Johnson] who was going to be a former President dictate my future."

While he was vice president, Hubert Humphrey was the subject of a satirical song by songwriter/musician Tom Lehrer entitled "Whatever Became of Hubert?" The song addressed how some liberals and progressives felt let down by Humphrey, who had become a much more mute figure as vice president than he had been as a senator. The song goes "Whatever became of Hubert? Has anyone heard a thing? Once he shone on his own, now he sits home alone and waits for the phone to ring. Once a fiery liberal spirit, ah, but now when he speaks he must clear it. ..."

During these years Humphrey was a repeated and favorite guest of Johnny Carson on The Tonight Show. He also struck up a friendship with Frank Sinatra, who supported his campaign for president in 1968 before his conversion to the Republican party in the early 1970s, and was perhaps most on notice in the fall of 1977 when Sinatra was the star attraction and host of a tribute to a then-ailing Humphrey. He also appeared on The Dean Martin Celebrity Roast in 1973.

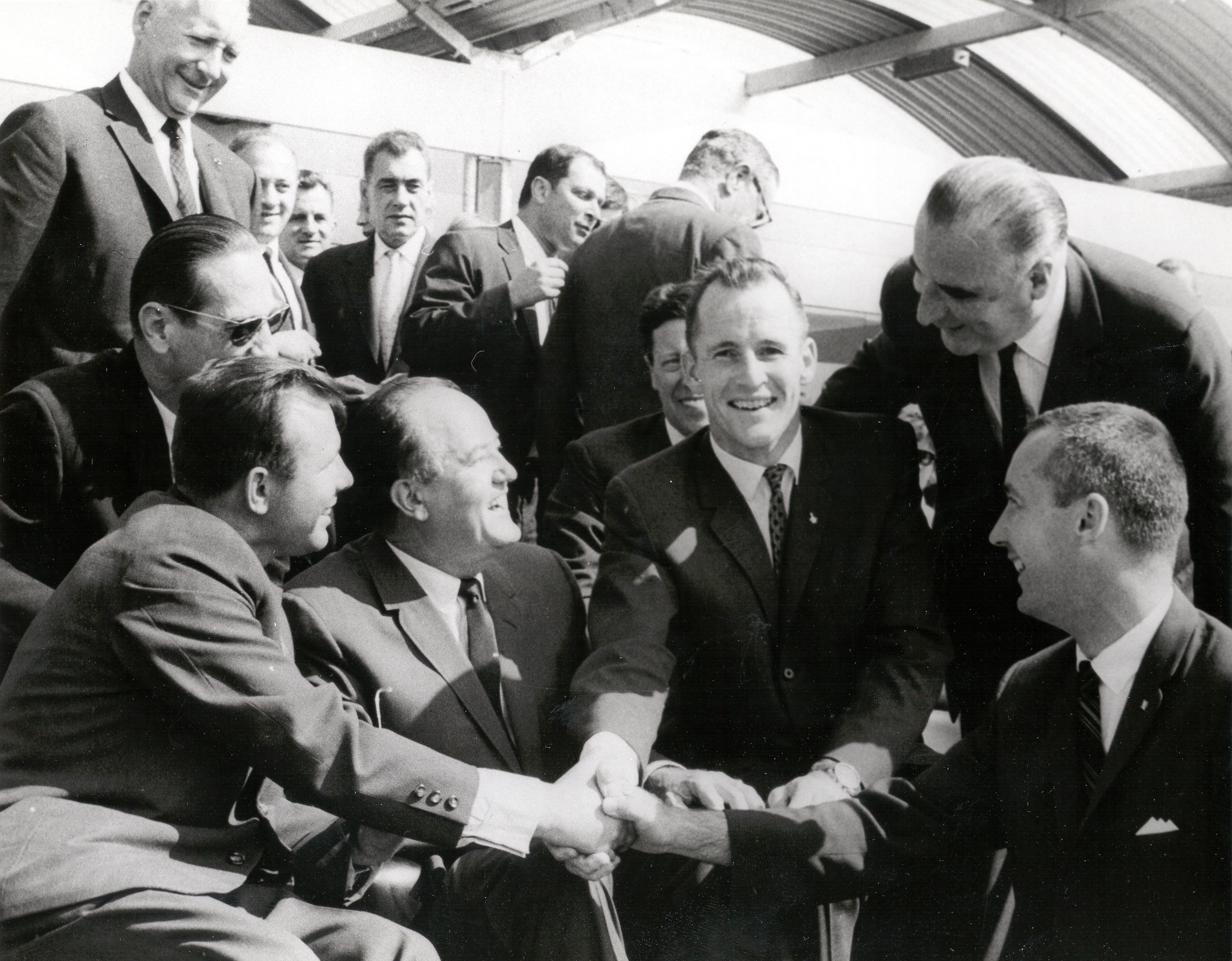
Humphrey with Soviet cosmonaut Yuri Gagarin and Gemini 4 astronauts at the 1965 Paris Air Show

On April 15, 1965, Humphrey delivered an address to the American Society of Newspaper Editors, pledging the incumbent session of Congress would "do more for the lasting long-term health of this nation" since the initial session in office at the time of Franklin D. Roosevelt assuming the presidency in 1933 and predicting 13 major measures of President Johnson's administration would be passed ahead of the session's conclusion. In mid-May 1965, Humphrey traveled to Dallas, Texas for an off-the-record discussion with donors of President Johnson's campaign. During the visit, Humphrey was imposed tight security as a result of the JFK assassination a year and a half prior and the mother of Lee Harvey Oswald was placed under surveillance by Police Chief Cato Hightower.

During a May 31, 1966, appearance at Huron College, Humphrey said the U.S. should not expect "either friendship or gratitude" in helping poorer countries. At a September 22, 1966 Jamesburg, New Jersey Democratic Party fundraiser, Humphrey said the Vietnam War would be shortened if the US stayed firm and hastened the return of troops: "We are making a decision not only to defend Vietnam, we are defending the United States of America."

During a May 1967 news conference, Humphrey said American anger toward Vietnam was losing traction and that he could see a growth in popularity for President Johnson since a low point five months prior. During an August 2, 1967, appearance in Detroit, Humphrey proposed each state consider forming peacekeeping councils focused on preventing violence, gaining community cooperation, and listening to "the voices of those who have gone unheard."

On November 4, 1967, Humphrey cited Malaysia as an example of what Vietnam could resemble post a Viet Cong defeat while in Jakarta, Indonesia. The following day, Vice President Humphrey requested Indonesia attempt mediation in the Vietnam War during a meeting with Suharto at Merdeka palace. On December 7, Vice President Humphrey said in an interview that the Viet Cong could potentially be the factor in creating a political compromise with the government of Saigon.

=== Civil rights ===
In February 1965, President Johnson appointed Humphrey to the chairmanship of the President's Council on Equal Opportunity. The position and board had been proposed by Humphrey, who told Johnson that the board should consist of members of the Cabinet and federal agency leaders and serve multiple roles: assisting agency cooperation, creating federal program consistency, using advanced planning to avoid potential racial unrest, creating public policy, and meeting with local and state level leaders. During his tenure, he appointed Wiley A Branton as executive director. During the first meeting of the group on March 3, Humphrey stated the budget was US$289,000 and pledged to ensure vigorous work by the small staff. Following the Watts riots in August of that year, Johnson downsized Humphrey's role as the administration's expert on civil rights. Dallek wrote the shift in role was in line with the change in policy the Johnson administration underwent in response to "the changing political mood in the country on aid to African Americans." In a private meeting with Joseph Califano on September 18, 1965, President Johnson stated his intent to remove Humphrey from the post of "point man" on civil rights within the administration, believing the vice president was tasked with enough work. Days later, Humphrey met with Johnson, Attorney General Nicholas Katzenbach, and White House Counsel Lee C. White. Johnson told Humphrey he would shorten his role within the administration's civil rights policies and pass a portion to Katzenbach, Califano writing that Humphrey agreed to go along with the plan reluctantly.

In an August 1967 speech at a county officials national convention in Detroit, Humphrey called for the establishment of a Marshall Plan that would curb poverty in the United States as well as address racial violence, and advocated for the creation of civil peace councils that would counter rioting. He said the councils should include representation from all minority groups and religions, state governments, the National Guard, and law enforcement agencies and that the United States would see itself out of trouble only when law and order was reestablished.

=== Foreign trips ===
December 1965 saw the beginning of Humphrey's tour of eastern countries, saying he hoped to have "cordial and frank discussions" ahead of the trip beginning when asked about the content of the talks. During a December 29 meeting with Prime Minister of Japan Eisaku Satō, Humphrey asked the latter for support on achieving peace in the Vietnam War and said it was a showing of strength that the United States wanted a peaceful ending rather than a display of weakness.

Humphrey began a European tour in late-March 1967 to mend frazzled relations and indicated that he was "ready to explain and ready to listen." On April 2, 1967, Vice President Humphrey met with Prime Minister of the United Kingdom Harold Wilson. Ahead of the meeting, Humphrey said they would discuss multiple topics including the nuclear nonproliferation treaty, European events, Atlantic alliance strengthening, and "the situation in the Far East". White House Press Secretary George Christian said five days later that he had received reports from Vice President Humphrey indicating his tour of the European countries was "very constructive" and said President Johnson was interested in the report as well. While Humphrey was in Florence, Italy on April 1, 1967, 23-year-old Giulio Stocchi threw eggs at the Vice President and missed. He was seized by American bodyguards who turned him in to Italian officers. In Brussels, Belgium on April 9, demonstrators led by communists threw rotten eggs and fruits at Vice President Humphrey's car, also hitting several of his bodyguards. In late-December 1967, Vice President Humphrey began touring Africa.

=== 1968 presidential campaign ===
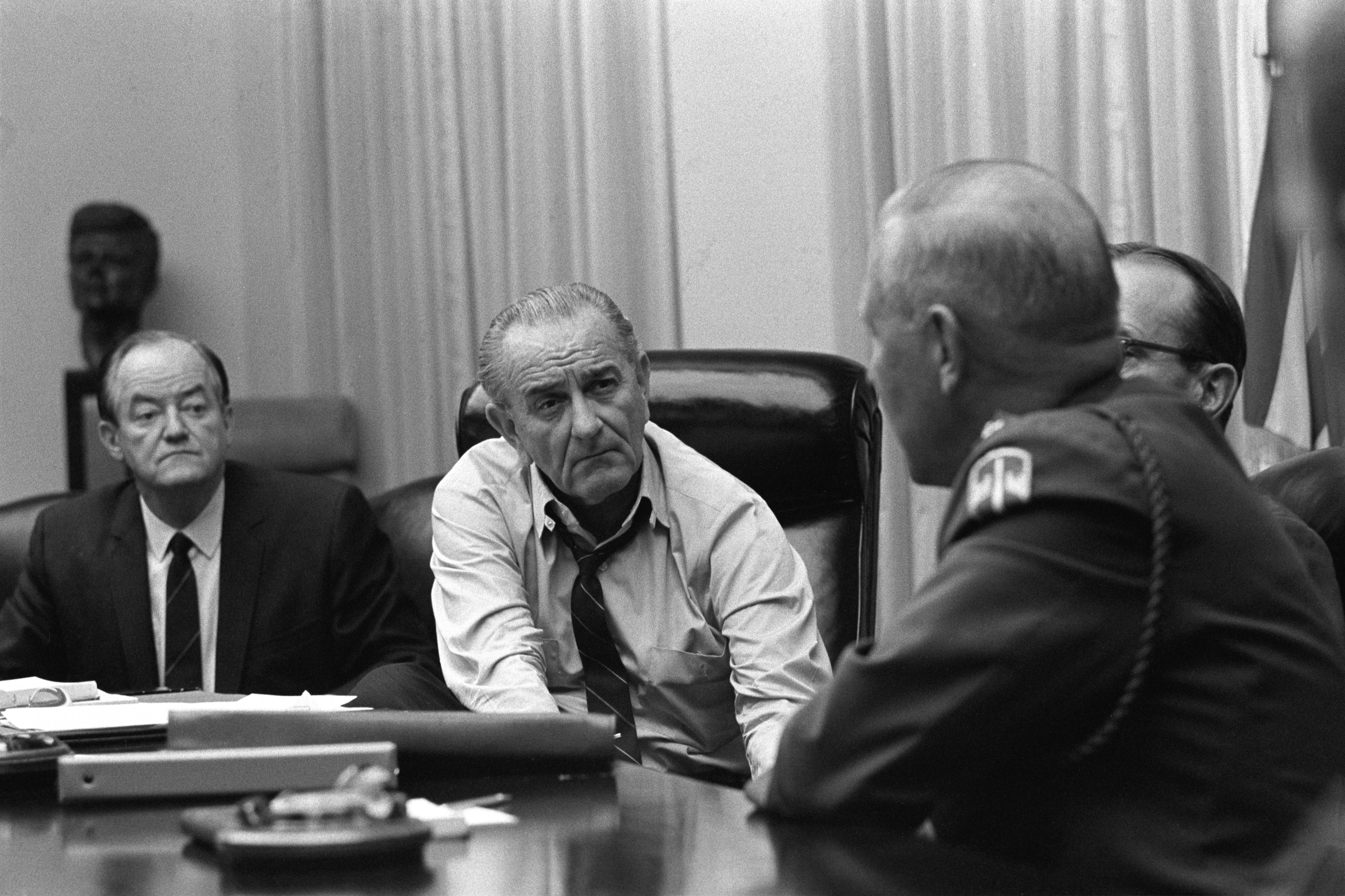
Vice President Hubert Humphrey, President Lyndon Johnson, and General Creighton Abrams in a Cabinet Room meeting in March 1968

As 1968 began, it looked as if President Johnson, despite the rapidly decreasing approval rating of his Vietnam War policies, would easily win the Democratic nomination for a second time. Humphrey was widely expected to remain as Johnson's running mate for reelection in 1968. Johnson was challenged by Senator Eugene McCarthy of Minnesota, who ran on an anti-Vietnam War platform. With the backing of out-of-state anti-war college students and activists while campaigning in the New Hampshire primary, McCarthy, who was not expected to be a serious contender for the Democratic nomination, nearly defeated Johnson, finishing with a surprising 42% of the vote to Johnson's 49%. A few days after the New Hampshire primary, after months of contemplation and originally intending to support Johnson's bid for reelection, Senator Robert F. Kennedy of New York also entered the race on an anti-war platform. On March 31, a week before the Wisconsin primary, where polls showed a strong standing for McCarthy, Johnson stunned the nation by withdrawing from his race for a second full term.

Humphrey announced his presidential candidacy on April 27. Declaring his candidacy in a speech in Washington, D.C. alongside Senators Fred Harris of Oklahoma and Walter Mondale of Minnesota (who both served as the co-chairs to his campaign), Humphrey stated:

Here we are, just as we ought to be, here we are, the people, here we are the spirit of dedication, here we are the way politics ought to be in America, the politics of happiness, politics of purpose, politics of joy; and that's the way it's going to be, all the way, too, from here on out. We seek an America able to preserve and nurture all the basic rights of free expression, yet able to reach across the divisions that too often separate race from race, region from region, young from old, worker from scholar, rich from poor. We seek an America able to do this in the higher knowledge that our goals and ideals are worthy of conciliation and personal sacrifice.

Also in his speech, Humphrey supported Johnson's Vietnam initiative, which Johnson had proposed during his address to the nation four weeks earlier; partially halting the bombings in North Vietnam, while sending an additional 13,500 troops and increasing the Department of Defense's budget by 4% over the next fiscal year. Later in the campaign, Humphrey opposed a proposal by Senators McCarthy and George McGovern of South Dakota to the Democratic Convention's Policy Committee, calling for an immediate end to the bombings in Vietnam, an early withdrawal of troops and setting talks for a coalition government with the Viet Cong.

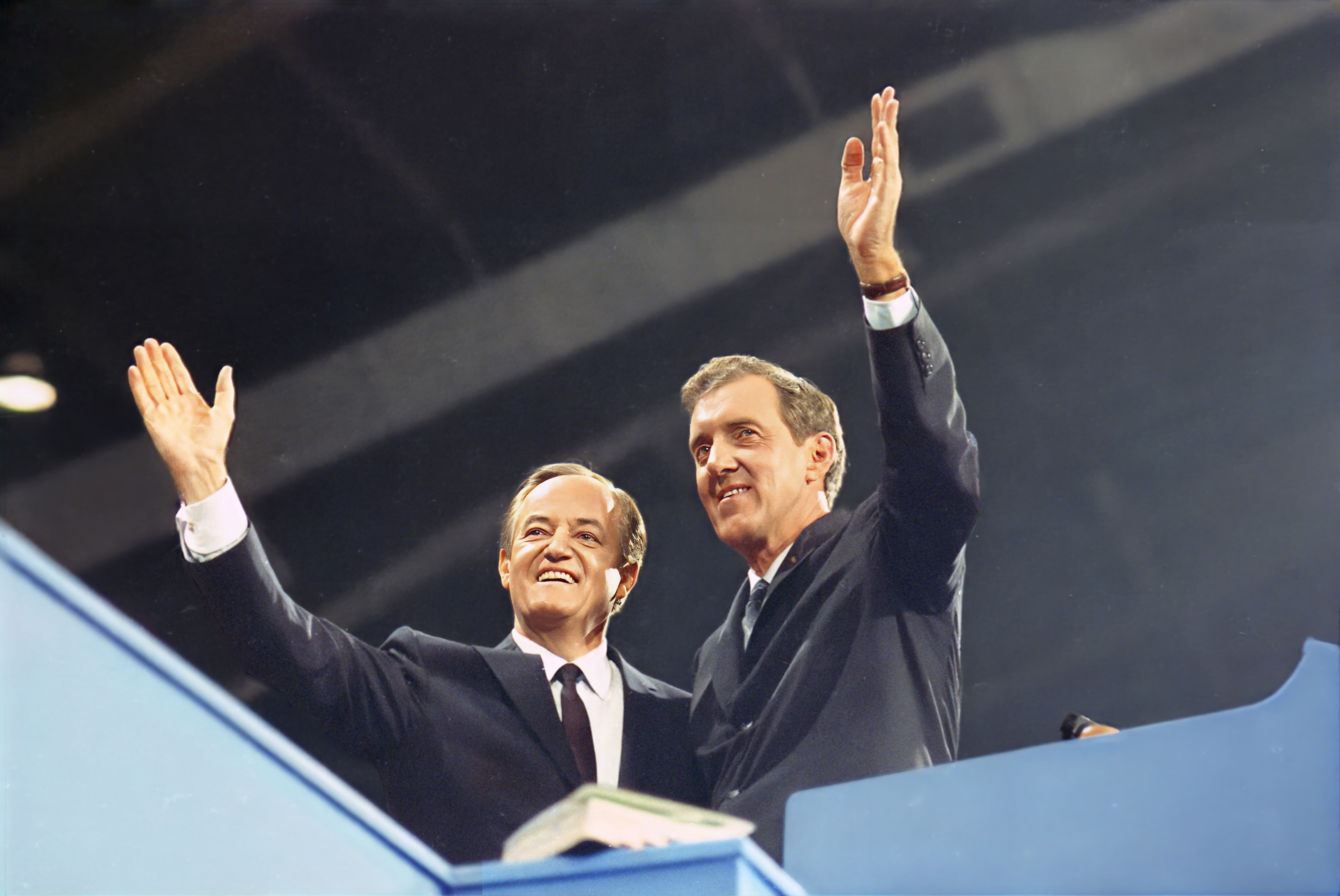
Vice President Humphrey (left) and U.S. Senator Edmund Muskie (right) wave from the podium at the 1968 Democratic National Convention in Chicago.

Many people saw Humphrey as Johnson's stand-in; he won major backing from the nation's labor unions and other Democratic groups troubled by young antiwar protesters and the social unrest around the nation. A group of British journalists wrote that Humphrey, despite his liberal record on civil rights and support for a nuclear test-ban treaty, "had turned into an arch-apologist for the war, who was given to trotting around Vietnam looking more than a little silly in olive-drab fatigues and a forage cap. The man whose name had been a by-word in the South for softness toward Negroes had taken to lecturing black groups ... the wild-eyed reformer had become the natural champion of every conservative element in the Democratic Party." Humphrey entered the race too late to participate in the Democratic primaries and concentrated on winning delegates in non-primary states by gaining the support of Democratic officeholders who were elected delegates to the Democratic Convention. By June, McCarthy won in Oregon and Pennsylvania, while Kennedy had won in Indiana and Nebraska, though Humphrey was the front runner as he led the delegate count. The California primary was crucial for Kennedy's campaign, as a McCarthy victory would have prevented Kennedy from reaching the number of delegates required to secure the nomination. On June 4, Kennedy defeated McCarthy by less than 4% in the winner-take-all California primary. But the nation was shocked yet again when Senator Kennedy was assassinated after his victory speech at the Ambassador Hotel in Los Angeles. After the assassination of Kennedy, Humphrey suspended his campaign for two weeks.

==== Chicago riots and party fallout ====
Humphrey did not enter any of the 13 state primary elections, but secured the Democratic nomination at the national convention in Chicago. Although antiwar candidates won most primary votes, party delegates adopted the nomination outcome and rejected the convention's proposed peace plank by 1,567 3/4 to 1,041 1/4. Humphrey selected U.S. Senator Ed Muskie of Maine as his running mate.

During the convention, thousands of antiwar demonstrators gathered in Grant Park—about five miles south of the International Amphitheatre—and in other locations near downtown Chicago. In widely covered confrontations, Mayor Richard J. Daley's police forces used force against demonstrators, many of them young people and students, intensifying public attention to disorder and division surrounding the convention.

1968 presidential election results

Humphrey's response to the unrest, Johnson's and Daley's behind-the-scenes efforts, and criticism that he won the nomination without competing in primaries contributed to tension within the party. Humphrey also declined to fully adopt Eugene McCarthy's proposals, and McCarthy did not offer an unqualified endorsement, further weakening Democratic unity. The climate of 1968—including President Johnson's unpopularity and the assassinations of Robert F. Kennedy and Martin Luther King Jr.—also shaped the general-election campaign. As American Independent Party candidate George Wallace later lost support among some white union voters, Humphrey narrowed the gap in polls, revised his Vietnam stance by calling for peace talks, and regained some support among antiwar Democrats.

Nixon won the electoral college and the election. Humphrey lost the popular vote by less than one percentage point, with 43.4% for Nixon (31,783,783 votes) to 42.7% (31,271,839) for Humphrey and 13.5% (9,901,118) for Wallace. Humphrey carried 13 states and the District of Columbia for 191 electoral votes, Nixon carried 32 states for 301 electoral votes, and Wallace carried five states for 46 electoral votes. In his concession speech, Humphrey said, "I have done my best. I have lost; Mr. Nixon has won. The democratic process has worked its will."

== Post-vice presidency (1969–1978) ==
=== Teaching and return to the Senate ===
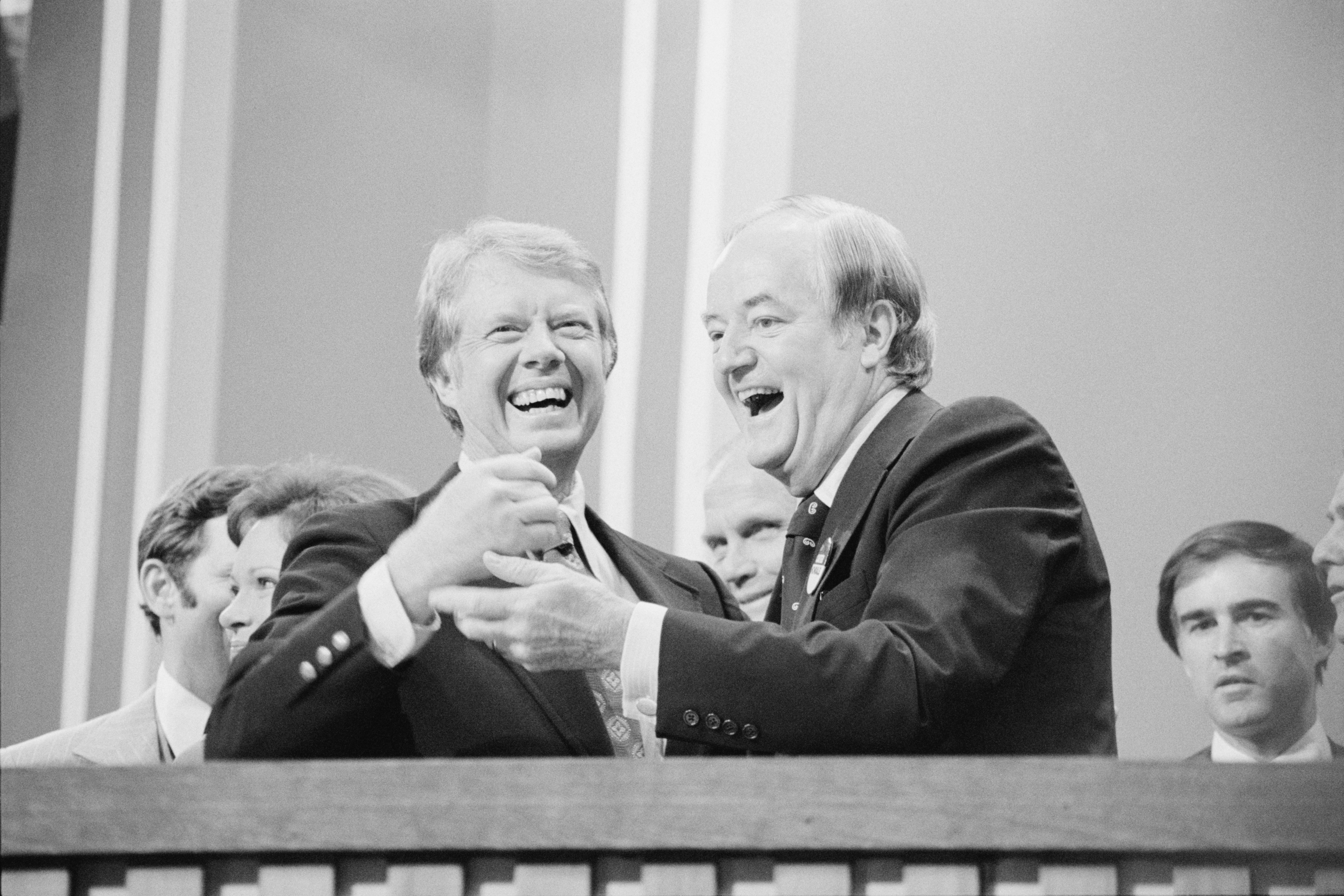
Senator Humphrey with Democratic presidential nominee Jimmy Carter, in 1976. California Governor Jerry Brown is at right.

After leaving the vice presidency, Humphrey taught at Macalester College and the University of Minnesota, and served as chairman of the board of consultants at the Encyclopædia Britannica Educational Corporation.

On February 11, 1969, Humphrey met privately with Mayor Richard J. Daley and denied ever being "at war" with Daley during a press conference later in the day. In March, Humphrey declined to answer questions on the Johnson administration being either involved or privy to the cessation of bombing of North Vietnam during an interview on Issues and Answers. At a press conference on June 2, 1969, Humphrey backed Nixon's peace efforts, dismissing the notion that he was not seeking an end to the war. In early July, Humphrey traveled to Finland for a private visit. Later that month, Humphrey returned to Washington after visiting Europe, a week after McCarthy declared he would not seek reelection, Humphrey declining to comment amid speculation he intended to return to the Senate. During the fall, Humphrey arranged to meet with President Nixon through United States National Security Advisor Henry Kissinger, Humphrey saying the day after the meeting that Nixon had "expressed his appreciation on my attitude to his effort on Vietnam." On August 3, Humphrey said that Russia was buying time to develop ballistic missile warheads to catch up with the United States and that security was the "overriding concern" of the Soviet Union. Days later, Humphrey repudiated efforts against Nixon's anti-ballistic missile system: "I have a feeling that they [opponents of the ABM] were off chasing rabbits when a tiger is loose." During October, Humphrey spoke before the AFL-CIO convention delegates, charging Nixon's economic policies with "putting Americans out of work without slowing inflation." On October 10, Humphrey stated his support for Nixon's policies in Vietnam and that he believed "the worst thing that we can do is to try to undermine the efforts of the President." At a December 21 press conference, Humphrey said Nixon was a participant in the "politics of polarization" and could not seek unity on one hand but have divisive agents on the other. On December 26, Humphrey responded to a claim from former President Johnson that Humphrey had been cost the election by his own call for a stop to the bombing in North Vietnam, saying he did what he "thought was right and responsible at Salt Lake City."

On January 4, 1970, Humphrey said the United States should cease tests of nuclear weapons during the continued conversations for potential strategic arms limitations between the United States and the Soviet Union while speaking to the National Retail Furniture Association. In February, Humphrey predicted Nixon would withdraw 75,000 or more troops prior to the year's midterm elections and the main issue would be the economy during an interview: "The issue of 1970 is the economy. Some of my fellow Democrats don't believe this. But this is a fact." On February 23, Humphrey disclosed his recommendation that Larry O'Brien return as Chair of the Democratic National Committee, a Humphrey spokesman reporting that he wanted the issue of the DNC chairmanship settled quickly. Solberg wrote that Nixon's April 1970 Cambodian Campaign quashed Humphrey's hopes that the war be taken out of political context. In May, Humphrey pledged to do all he could to provide additional war planes to Israel and stress the issue to American leaders. Amid an August 11 address to an American Bar Association luncheon meeting, Humphrey called for liberals to cease defending campus radicals and militants and align with law and order.

Humphrey had not planned to return to political life, but saw an opportunity when McCarthy did not seek reelection in the 1970 midterm elections. (McCarthy recognized that his opposition to Johnson and Humphrey had angered much of his party, making his renomination unlikely.) Humphrey won the nomination, defeated Republican Congressman Clark MacGregor, and returned to the U.S. Senate on January 3, 1971. Before resuming his duties, Humphrey had a November 16, 1970, White House meeting with Nixon as part of a group of newly elected senators. He was reelected in 1976 and remained in office until his death. In a rarity in politics, Humphrey held both Senate seats from his state (Class I and Class II) at different times. During his return to the Senate he served in the 92nd, 93rd, 94th, and part of the 95th Congress. He chaired the Joint Economic Committee in the 94th Congress.

=== Fourth Senate term ===
L. Edward Purcell wrote that upon returning to the Senate, Humphrey found himself "again a lowly junior senator with no seniority" and that he resolved to create credibility in the eyes of liberals. On May 3, 1971, after the Americans for Democratic Action adopted a resolution demanding Nixon's impeachment, Humphrey said they were acting "more out of emotion and passion than reason and prudent judgment" and that the request was irresponsible. On May 21, Humphrey said ending hunger and malnutrition in the U.S. was "a moral obligation" during a speech to International Food Service Manufacturers Association members. In June, Humphrey delivered the commencement address at the University of Bridgeport and days later said that he believed Nixon was interested in seeing a peaceful end to the Vietnam War "as badly as any senator or anybody else." On July 14, testifying before the Senate Foreign Relations Subcommittee on Arms Control, Humphrey proposed amending the defense procurement bill to place in escrow all funds for creation and usage of multiple‐missile warheads in the midst of continued arms limitations talks. Humphrey said members of the Nixon administration needed to remember "when they talk of a tough negotiating position, they are going to get a tough response." On September 6, Humphrey rebuked the Nixon administration's wage price freeze, saying it was based on trickle-down policies and advocating "percolate up" as a replacement, while speaking at a United Rubber Workers gathering. On October 26, Humphrey stated his support for removing barriers to voting registration and authorizing students to establish voting residences in their college communities, rebuking the refusal of United States Attorney General John N. Mitchell the previous month to take a role in shaping voter registration laws as applicable to new voters. On December 24, 1971, Humphrey accused the Nixon administration of turning its back on the impoverished in the rural U.S., citing few implementations of the relief recommendations of the 1967 National Advisory Commission; in another statement he said only three of the 150 recommendations had been implemented. On December 27, responding to antiwar protesters in Philadelphia, Humphrey said the Nixon administration was responsible for an escalation of the Southeast Asia war and requested complete cessation of North Vietnam bombing.

In January 1972, Humphrey said the U.S. would have been out of Vietnam by that point had he been elected president, saying Nixon was taking longer to withdraw American troops from the country than it took to defeat Adolf Hitler. On May 20, Humphrey said Nixon's proposal to limit schoolchildren busing was "insufficient in the amount of aid needed for our children, deceptive to the American people, and insensitive to the laws and the Constitution of this nation", in a reversal of his prior stance, while in Milwaukee, Wisconsin. During a May 30 appearance in Burbank, California, Humphrey stated his support for an immediate withdrawal of American forces from South Vietnam despite an invasion by North Vietnam.

In January 1973, Humphrey said the Nixon administration was plotting to eliminate a school milk program in the upcoming fiscal year budget during a telephone interview. On February 18, 1973, Humphrey said the Middle East could possibly usher in peace following the Vietnam War ending along with American troops withdrawing from Indochina during an appearance at the New York Hilton. In August 1973, Humphrey called on Nixon to schedule a meeting with nations exporting and importing foods as part of an effort to both create a worldwide policy on food and do away with food hoarding. After Nixon's dismissal of Archibald Cox, Humphrey said he found "the whole situation entirely depressing." Three days after Cox's dismissal, during a speech to the AFL-CIO convention on October 23, Humphrey declined to say whether he believed Nixon should be impeached, saying that his congressional position would likely cause him to play a role in determining Nixon's fate. On December 21, Humphrey disclosed his request of federal tax deductions of $199,153 for the donation of his vice-presidential papers to the Minnesota State Historical Society.

In early January 1974, Humphrey checked into the Bethesda Naval Hospital for tests regarding a minute tumor of the bladder. His physician Edgar Berman said the next day that Humphrey "looks fine and feels fine" and was expected to leave early the following week. In an interview conducted on March 29, 1974, Humphrey concurred with Senator Mike Mansfield's assessment from the prior day that the House of Representatives had enough votes to impeach Nixon. Humphrey was reportedly pleased by Nixon's resignation.

In an April 1975 news conference at the spring education conference of the United Federation of Teachers, Humphrey cited the need for a national department of education, a national education trust fund, and a federal government provision for a third of America's educational expenses. He said the Ford administration had no educational policy and noted the United States was the only industrialized country without a separate national education department. In May, Humphrey testified at the trial of his former campaign manager Jack L. Chestnut, admitting that as a candidate he sought the support of Associated Milk Producers, Inc., but saying he was not privy to the illegal contributions Chestnut was accused of taking from the organization. Later that month, Humphrey was one of 19 senators to originate a letter stating the expectation of 75 senators that Ford would submit a foreign aid request to Congress meeting the "urgent military and economic needs" of Israel. In August, after the United States Court of Appeals ruled that Ford had no authority to continue levying fees of $2 a barrel on imported oil, Humphrey hailed the decision as "the best news we've heard on the inflation front in a long time" and urged Ford to accept the decision because the price reduction on oil and oil‐related products would benefit the national economy. In October, after Sara Jane Moore attempted to assassinate Ford, Humphrey joined former presidential candidates Barry Goldwater, Edmund Muskie, and George McGovern in urging Ford and other presidential candidates to restrain their campaigning the following year to prevent future attempts on their lives.

In October 1976, Humphrey was admitted to a hospital for the removal of a cancerous bladder, predicted his victory in his reelection bid, and advocated for members of his party to launch efforts to increase voter turnout upon his release.

=== 1972 presidential campaign ===
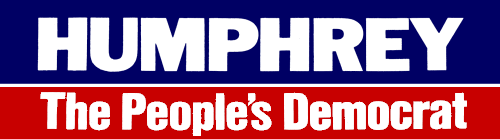
1972 campaign logo

On November 4, 1970, shortly after being reelected to the Senate, Humphrey stated his intention to take on the role of a "harmonizer" within the Democratic Party to minimize the possibility of potential presidential candidates within the party lambasting each other prior to deciding to run in the then-upcoming election, dismissing that he was an active candidate at that time. In December 1971, Humphrey made his second trip to New Jersey in under a month, talking with a plurality of county leaders at the Robert Treat Hotel: "I told them I wanted their support. I said I'd rather work with them than against them."

In 1972, Humphrey once again ran for the Democratic nomination for president, announcing his candidacy on January 10, 1972, during a twenty-minute speech in Philadelphia. At the time of the announcement, Humphrey said he was running on a platform of the removal of troops from Vietnam and a revitalization of the United States economy. He drew upon continuing support from organized labor and the African-American and Jewish communities, but remained unpopular with college students because of his association with the Vietnam War, even though he had altered his position in the years since his 1968 defeat. Humphrey initially planned to skip the primaries, as he had in 1968. Even after he revised this strategy he still stayed out of New Hampshire, a decision that allowed McGovern to emerge as the leading challenger to Muskie in that state. Humphrey did win some primaries, including those in Ohio, Indiana and Pennsylvania, but was defeated by McGovern in several others, including the crucial California primary. Humphrey also was out-organized by McGovern in caucus states and was trailing in delegates at the 1972 Democratic National Convention in Miami Beach, Florida. His hopes rested on challenges to the credentials of some of the McGovern delegates. For example, the Humphrey forces argued that the winner-take-all rule for the California primary violated procedural reforms intended to produce a better reflection of the popular vote, the reason that the Illinois delegation was bounced. The effort failed, as several votes on delegate credentials went McGovern's way, guaranteeing his victory. After his primary win, McGovern asked Humphrey to be his running mate, but Humphrey declined. After the election, Humphrey called Nixon and the two had an amicable conversation in which Humphrey implied that he preferred Nixon to McGovern, and had tried to keep McGovern from winning in 1972 presidential election.

=== 1976 presidential election activities ===
On April 22, 1974, Humphrey said that he would not enter the upcoming Democratic presidential primary for the 1976 presidential election. Humphrey said at the time that he was urging fellow Senator and Minnesotan Walter Mondale to run, despite believing that Ted Kennedy would enter the race as well. Leading up to the election cycle, Humphrey also said, "Here's a time in my life when I appear to have more support than at any other time in my life. But it's too financially, politically, and physically debilitating – and I'm just not going to do it." In December 1975, a Gallup poll was released showing Humphrey and Ronald Reagan as the leading Democratic and Republican candidates for the following year's presidential election.

On April 12, 1976, Chairman of the New Jersey Democratic Party State Senator James P. Dugan said the selection of a majority of uncommitted delegates could be interpreted as a victory for Humphrey, who had indicated his availability as a presidential candidate for the convention. Humphrey announced his choice to not enter the New Jersey primary nor authorize any committees to work to support him during an April 29, 1976, appearance in the Senate Caucus Room. Even after Jimmy Carter had won enough delegates to clinch the nomination, many still wanted Humphrey to announce his availability for a draft. However, he did not do so, and Carter easily secured the nomination on the first round of balloting. Humphrey had learned that he had terminal cancer, prompting him to sit the race out.

Humphrey attended the November 17, 1976, meeting between President-elect Carter and Democratic congressional leaders in which Carter sought out support for a proposal to have the president's power to reorganize the government reinstated with potential to be vetoed by Congress.

=== Fifth Senate term ===
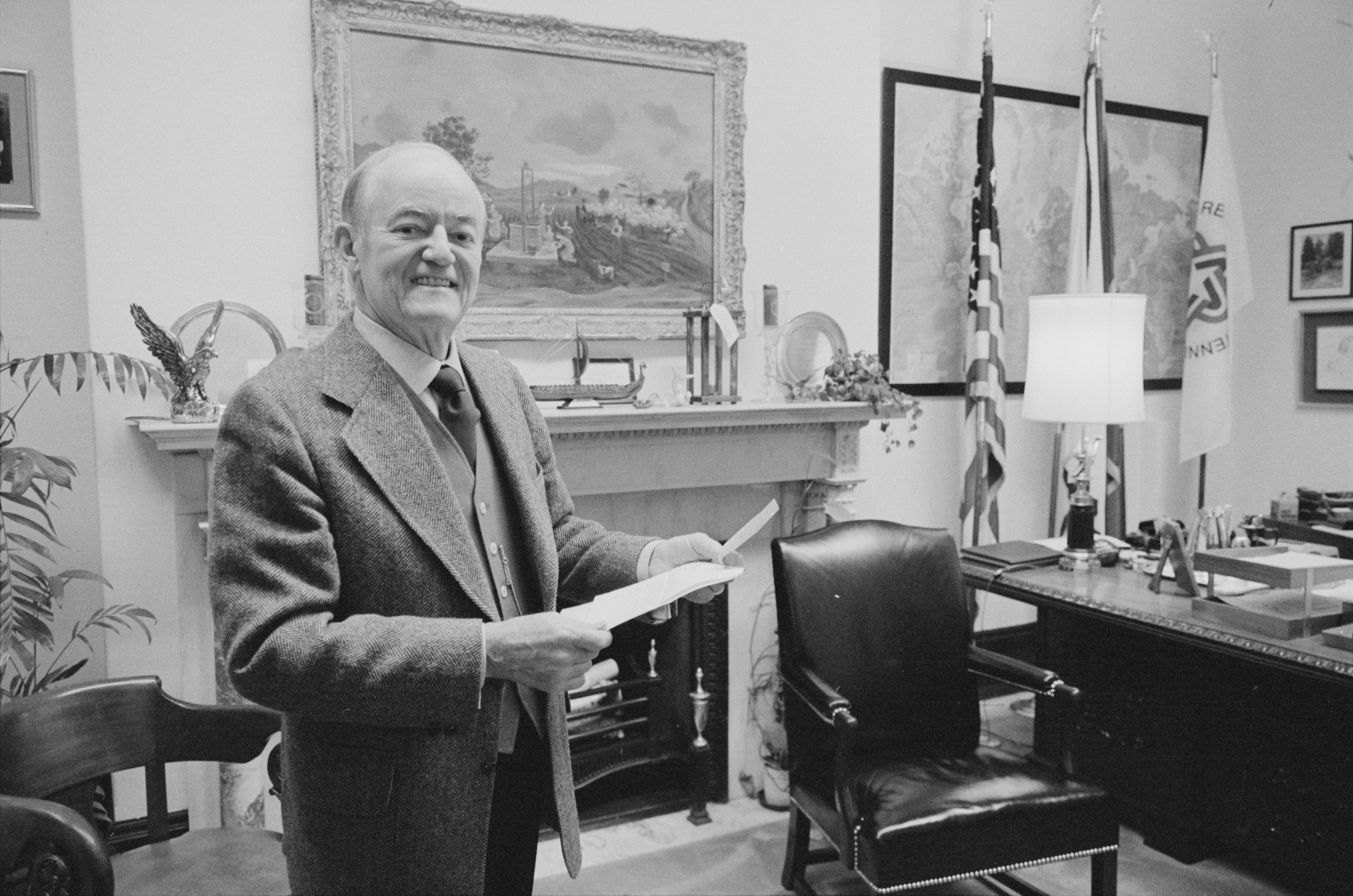
Senator Humphrey in his office at the U.S. Capitol in 1976

Humphrey attended the May 3, 1977, White House meeting on legislative priorities. Humphrey told President Carter that the U.S. would enter a period of high unemployment without an economic stimulus and noted that in "every period in our history, a rise in unemployment has been accompanied by a rise in inflation". Humphrey stated a preventative health care program would be the only way for the Carter administration to not have to fund soaring health costs. In July 1977, after the Senate began debating approval for funding of the neutron bomb, Humphrey stated that the White House had agreed to release the impact statement, a requirement for congressional funding of a new weapon.

=== Deputy President pro tempore of the Senate (1977–1978) ===
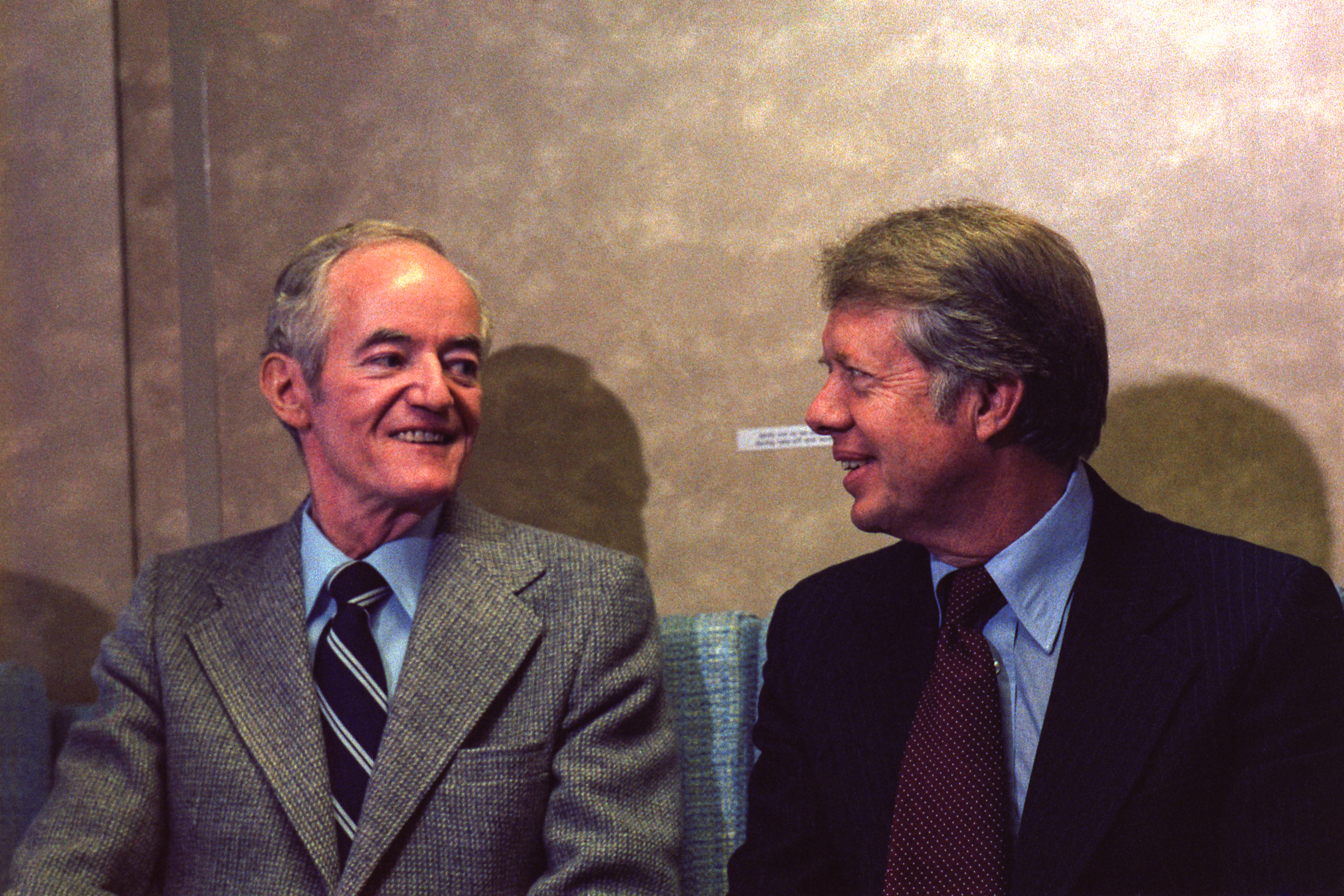
Senator Hubert Humphrey with President Jimmy Carter aboard Air Force One in 1977

In 1974, along with Rep. Augustus Hawkins of California, Humphrey authored the Humphrey-Hawkins Full Employment Act, the first attempt at full employment legislation. The original bill proposed to guarantee full employment to all citizens over 16 and set up a permanent system of public jobs to meet that goal. A watered-down version called the Full Employment and Balanced Growth Act passed the House and Senate in 1978. It set the goal of 4 percent unemployment and 3 percent inflation and instructed the Federal Reserve Board to try to produce those goals when making policy decisions.

Humphrey ran for Majority Leader after the 1976 election but lost to Robert Byrd of West Virginia. The Senate honored Humphrey by creating the post of Deputy President pro tempore of the Senate for him. On August 16, 1977, Humphrey revealed he was suffering from terminal bladder cancer. On October 25 of that year, he addressed the Senate, and on November 3, Humphrey became the first person other than a member of the House or the President of the United States to address the House of Representatives in session. President Carter honored him by giving him command of Air Force One for his final trip to Washington on October 23. One of Humphrey's final speeches contained the lines "It was once said that the moral test of Government is how that Government treats those who are in the dawn of life, the children; those who are in the twilight of life, the elderly; and those who are in the shadows of life, the sick, the needy and the handicapped", which is sometimes described as the "liberals' mantra".

== Death and funeral ==
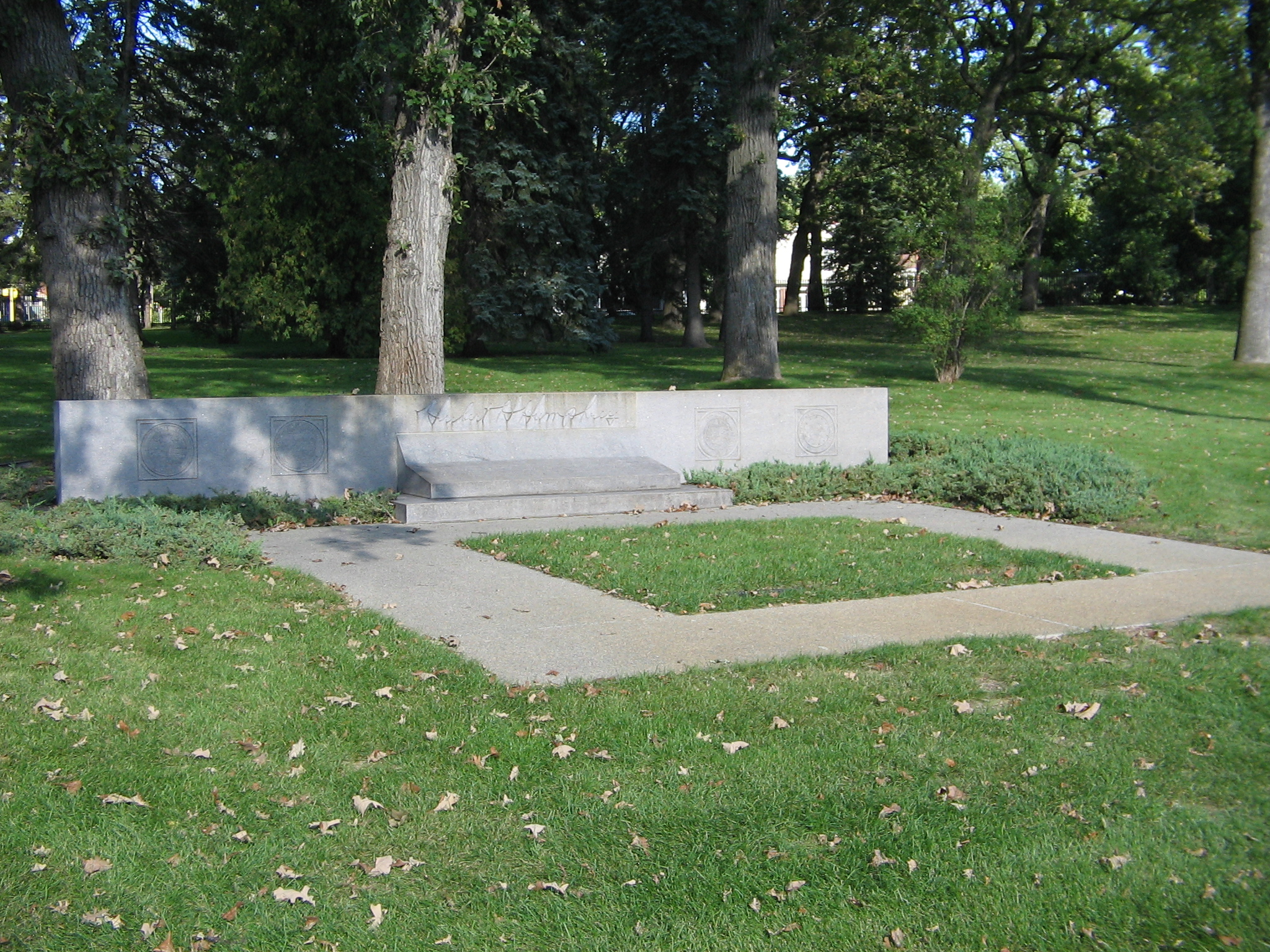
Burial plot of Hubert and Muriel Humphrey at Lakewood Cemetery in Minneapolis

Humphrey spent his last weeks calling old political acquaintances. One call was to Richard Nixon, inviting him to his upcoming funeral, which Nixon accepted. Staying in the hospital, Humphrey went from room to room, cheering up other patients by telling them jokes and listening to them. On January 13, 1978, he died of bladder cancer at his home in Waverly, Minnesota, at the age of 66.

Humphrey's body lay in state in the rotundas of the U.S. Capitol and the Minnesota State Capitol before being interred at Lakewood Cemetery in Minneapolis. His death overshadowed the death of his colleague from Montana, Senator Lee Metcalf, who had died the day before Humphrey. Old friends and opponents of Humphrey, from Gerald Ford and Richard Nixon to President Carter and Vice President Walter Mondale, paid their final respects. "He taught us how to live, and finally he taught us how to die", said Mondale.

Humphrey's wife Muriel was appointed by Minnesota governor Rudy Perpich to serve in the U.S. Senate until a special election to fill the term was held; she did not seek election to finish her husband's term in office. In 1981, she married Max Brown and took the name Muriel Humphrey Brown. Upon her death in 1998 she was interred next to Humphrey at Lakewood Cemetery.

The epitaph on Humphrey's gravestone reads: "I have enjoyed my life, its disappointments outweighed by its pleasures. I have loved my country in a way that some people consider sentimental and out of style. I still do, and I remain an optimist, with joy, without apology, about this country and about the American experiment in democracy."

== Honors and legacy ==
In 1965, Humphrey was made an Honorary Life Member of Alpha Phi Alpha, a historically African American fraternity.

In 1978, Humphrey received the U.S. Senator John Heinz Award for Greatest Public Service by an Elected or Appointed Official, an award given out annually by Jefferson Awards.

He was awarded posthumously the Congressional Gold Medal on June 13, 1979, and the Presidential Medal of Freedom in 1980.

He was honored by the United States Postal Service with a 52¢ Great Americans series (1980–2000) postage stamp.

There is a statue of him in front of the Minneapolis City Hall.

Humphrey's legacy is bolstered by his early leadership in civil rights, and undermined by his long support of the Vietnam War. His leading biographer Arnold A. Offner says he was "the most successful legislator in the nation's history and a powerful voice for equal justice for all." Offner writes that Humphrey was:

A major force for nearly every important liberal policy initiative....putting civil rights on his party's and the nation's agenda [in 1948] for decades to come. As senator he proposed legislation to effect national health insurance, for aid to poor nations, immigration and income tax reform, a Job Corps, the Peace Corps, the Arms Control and Disarmament Agency, and the path breaking 1963 Limited Test Ban Treaty....[He provided] masterful stewardship of the historic 1964 Civil Rights Act through the Senate.

While acknowledging his accomplishments, some historians emphasize that Humphrey was "a flawed, and not entirely likeable, figure who talked too much and neglected his family while pursuing a politics of compromise that owed as much to his vaunting personal ambition as to political pragmatism."

=== Namesakes ===
==== Fellowship ====
- The Hubert H. Humphrey Fellowship Program, which fosters an exchange of knowledge and mutual understanding throughout the world.

==== Awards ====
- Hubert H. Humphrey Award for Dedication and Leadership to the Minnesota DFL, issued annually by the DFL.

==== Buildings and institutions ====
- The Hubert H. Humphrey Terminal at Minneapolis-Saint Paul International Airport
- The former Hubert H. Humphrey Metrodome domed stadium in Minneapolis which was home to the Minnesota Vikings of the National Football League and the Minnesota Twins of Major League Baseball.
- The Hubert H. Humphrey Job Corps Center in St. Paul, Minnesota.
- The Hubert H. Humphrey School of Public Affairs at the University of Minnesota and its building, the Hubert H. Humphrey Center (formerly Hubert H. Humphrey Institute of Public Affairs; changed in January 2011)
- The Hubert H. Humphrey Building of the Department of Health and Human Services in Washington, D.C.
- The Hubert H. Humphrey Bridge carrying FL S.R. 520 over the Indian River Lagoon between Cocoa and Merritt Island in Brevard County, Florida
- The Hubert H. Humphrey Middle School in Bolingbrook, Illinois.
- The Hubert H. Humphrey Comprehensive Health Center of the Los Angeles County Department of Health Services in Los Angeles, California.
- The Hubert H. Humphrey Recreation Center of the City of Los Angeles Department of Recreation and Parks in Pacoima, CA.
- The Hubert H. Humphrey Auditorium at Doland High School in Doland, South Dakota.
- The Hubert H. Humphrey Elementary School in Albuquerque, New Mexico
- The Hubert H. Humphrey Elementary School in Waverly, Minnesota
- The Hubert H. Humphrey Cancer Center in Robbinsdale, Minnesota

== Portrayals ==
- Franklin Cover in the 1982 television film A Woman Called Golda.
- Bradley Whitford in the 2016 television film All the Way.
- Doug McKeon in the 2017 film LBJ.

== See also ==
- Politics of Minnesota
- Humphrey's son, Skip Humphrey and grandson Buck Humphrey are also Minnesotan politicians.
- List of members of the United States Congress who died in office (1950–1999)
- Humphrey objection

== References and further reading ==
- Boomhower, Ray E. (2020). "Fighting the Good Fight: John Bartlow Martin and Hubert Humphrey's 1968 Presidential Campaign". Indiana Magazine of History. 116 (1): 1–29. doi:10.2979/indimagahist.116.1.01. JSTOR 10.2979/indimagahist.116.1.01. S2CID 214394558.
- Caro, Robert A. (2002). Master of the Senate: The Years of Lyndon Johnson III. Knopf Doubleday Publishing Group. ISBN 978-0-394-52836-6.
- Chester, Lewis, Hodgson, Godfrey, Page, Bruce. An American Melodrama: The Presidential Campaign of 1968. New York: The Viking Press, 1969. online
- Cohen, Dan. Undefeated: The Life of Hubert H. Humphrey. Minneapolis: Lerner Publications, 1978.
- Dallek, Robert. An Unfinished Life: John F. Kennedy, 1917–1963. New York: Little, Brown and Company, 2003.
- Freedman, Samuel G. Into the Bright Sunshine: Young Hubert Humphrey and the Fight for Civil Rights (New York: Oxford University Press, 2023);
- Garrettson, Charles L. III. Hubert H. Humphrey: The Politics of Joy. New Brunswick, NJ: Transaction Publishers, 1993.
- Gitlin, Todd (1987). The Sixties: Years of Hope, Days of Rage. Bantam Books. ISBN 978-0-553-34601-5.
- Gould, Lewis L. 1968: The Election That Changed America (Chicago: Ivan R. Dee, 1993). online
- Humphrey, Hubert H. The Education of a Public Man: My Life and Politics. Garden City, NY: Doubleday, 1976, a primary source. online
- Johns, Andrew L. The Price of Loyalty: Hubert Humphrey's Vietnam Conflict (Rowman & Littlefield, 2020).
- Mann, Robert. The Walls of Jericho: Lyndon Johnson, Hubert Humphrey, Richard Russell and the Struggle for Civil Rights. New York: Harcourt Brace, 1996. online
- Offner, Arnold. Hubert Humphrey: The Conscience of the Country (New Haven: Yale University Press, 2018).
- Ross, Irwin. The Loneliest Campaign: The Truman Victory of 1948. New York: New American Library, 1968.
- Schlesinger, Arthur M., Jr. Robert Kennedy and His Times. New York: Ballantine Books, 1996.
- Solberg, Carl (1984). Hubert Humphrey: A Biography. Minnesota Historical Society Press. ISBN 978-0-87351-473-6.
- Taylor, Jeff. Where Did the Party Go? William Jennings Bryan, Hubert Humphrey, and the Jeffersonian Legacy. Columbia: University of Missouri Press, 2006.
- Thurber, Timothy N. The Politics of Equality: Hubert H. Humphrey and the African American Freedom Struggle. (NY: Columbia University Press, 1999).
- Traub, James. True Believer: Hubert Humphrey's Quest for a More Just America (New York: Basic Books, 2024) online book review
- White, Theodore H. The Making of the President 1960. New York: Barnes & Noble Books, 2004. (Reprint)
- Ybarra, Michael J. (2004). Washington Gone Crazy: Senator Pat McCarran and the Great American Communist Hunt. Steerforth Press. ISBN 978-1-58642-091-8.

=== Primary sources ===
- Berman, Edgar. Hubert: The Triumph And Tragedy Of The Humphrey I Knew. (New York: G.P. Putnam's & Sons, 1979) A physician's personal account of his friendship with Humphrey from 1957 to 1978.
- Humphrey, Hubert H. The Education of a Public Man: My Life and Politics (1976), autobiography. online
- Humphrey, Hubert H. The cause is mankind; a liberal program for modern America (NY: Praeger, 1964) online
- Wilson, Paula, ed. The civil rights rhetoric of Hubert H. Humphrey : 1948-1964 (1996) online

Political offices
Preceded by Marvin L. Kline	Mayor of Minneapolis; 1945–1949	Succeeded by Eric G. Hoyer
Preceded by Lyndon B. Johnson	Vice President of the United States; 1965–1969	Succeeded by Spiro Agnew
New office	Deputy President pro tempore of the U.S. Senate; 1977–1978	Succeeded by George J. Mitchell
Party political offices
Preceded by Ed Murphy	Democratic nominee for U.S. Senator from Minnesota (Class 2); 1948, 1954, 1960	Succeeded by Walter Mondale
Preceded by Mike Mansfield	Senate Democratic Whip; 1961–1964	Succeeded by Russell B. Long
Preceded by Lyndon B. Johnson	Democratic nominee for Vice President of the United States; 1964	Succeeded by Edmund Muskie
Preceded by Lyndon B. Johnson	Democratic nominee for President of the United States; 1968	Succeeded by George McGovern
Preceded by Eugene McCarthy	Democratic nominee for U.S. Senator from Minnesota (Class 1); 1970, 1976	Succeeded by Bob Short
Preceded by Mike Mansfield	Response to the State of the Union address 1975; Served alongside: Carl Albert	Succeeded by Edmund Muskie
U.S. Senate
Preceded by Joseph H. Ball	U.S. Senator (Class 2) from Minnesota; 1949–1964; Served alongside: Edward Thye, Eugene McCarthy	Succeeded by Walter Mondale
Preceded by Mike Mansfield	Senate Majority Whip; 1961–1964	Succeeded by Russell B. Long
Preceded by Eugene McCarthy	U.S. Senator (Class 1) from Minnesota; 1971–1978; Served alongside: Walter Mondale, Wendell Anderson	Succeeded by Muriel Humphrey
Honorary titles
Preceded by Lyndon B. Johnson	Persons who have lain in state or honor in the United States Capitol rotunda 1978	Succeeded by Unknown Soldier of the Vietnam Era (Michael Blassie)
