= Wallace, South Dakota =

- Town
- Location in Codington County and the state of South Dakota
- Coordinates: 45°05′04″N 97°28′41″W
- Country: United States
- State: South Dakota
- County: Codington
- Incorporated: 1908

Area
  - Total: 0.13 sq mi (0.34 km^{2})
  - Land: 0.13 sq mi (0.34 km^{2})
  - Water: 0 sq mi (0.00 km^{2})
- Elevation: 1,782 ft (543 m)

Population (2020)
  - Total: 91
  - Density: 684.1/sq mi (264.13/km^{2})
- Time zone: UTC-6 (CST)
  - Summer (DST): UTC-5 (CDT)
- ZIP code: 57272
- Area code: 605
- FIPS code: 46-68420
- GNIS feature ID: 1267623

Wallace is a town in Codington County, South Dakota, United States. The population was 91 at the 2020 census. It is part of the Watertown, South Dakota Micropolitan Statistical Area.

== History ==
The town was named for the original owner of the town site.

== Geography ==
According to the United States Census Bureau, the town has a total area of 0.13 square miles (0.34 km^{2}), all land.

== Demographics ==
Historical population
Census	Pop.	Note	%±
1910	207		—
1920	235		13.5%
1930	189		−19.6%
1940	193		2.1%
1950	188		−2.6%
1960	132		−29.8%
1970	95		−28.0%
1980	90		−5.3%
1990	83		−7.8%
2000	86		3.6%
2010	85		−1.2%
2020	91		7.1%
2021 (est.)	94	▲	3.3%
U.S. Decennial Census; 2020 Census

=== 2010 census ===
As of the census of 2010, there were 85 people, 34 households, and 24 families residing in the town. The population density was 653.8 inhabitants per square mile (252.4/km^{2}). There were 42 housing units at an average density of 323.1 per square mile (124.7/km^{2}). The racial makeup of the town was 96.5% White, 2.4% African American, and 1.2% from two or more races.

There were 34 households, of which 38.2% had children under the age of 18 living with them, 47.1% were married couples living together, 17.6% had a female householder with no husband present, 5.9% had a male householder with no wife present, and 29.4% were non-families. 29.4% of all households were made up of individuals, and 8.8% had someone living alone who was 65 years of age or older. The average household size was 2.50 and the average family size was 3.13.

The median age in the town was 34.8 years. 35.3% of residents were under the age of 18; 5.8% were between the ages of 18 and 24; 18.9% were from 25 to 44; 29.5% were from 45 to 64; and 10.6% were 65 years of age or older. The gender makeup of the town was 50.6% male and 49.4% female.

=== 2000 census ===
As of the census of 2000, there were 86 people, 37 households, and 23 families residing in the town. The population density was 637.8 inhabitants per square mile (246.3/km^{2}). There were 45 housing units at an average density of 333.7 per square mile (128.8/km^{2}). The racial makeup of the town was 100.00% White.

There were 37 households, out of which 35.1% had children under the age of 18 living with them, 54.1% were married couples living together, 5.4% had a female householder with no husband present, and 37.8% were non-families. 37.8% of all households were made up of individuals, and 27.0% had someone living alone who was 65 years of age or older. The average household size was 2.32 and the average family size was 3.13.

In the town, the population was spread out, with 33.7% under the age of 18, 3.5% from 18 to 24, 27.9% from 25 to 44, 9.3% from 45 to 64, and 25.6% who were 65 years of age or older. The median age was 34 years. For every 100 females, there were 72.0 males. For every 100 females age 18 and over, there were 83.9 males.

The median income for a household in the town was $27,708, and the median income for a family was $33,438. Males had a median income of $33,750 versus $24,063 for females. The per capita income for the town was $14,677. There were no families and 9.1% of the population living below the poverty line, including no under eighteens and 18.2% of those over 64.

== Education ==
It is in the Webster School District 18-5.

== Notable people ==
- Hubert Humphrey, 38th vice president of the United States
