= Clark MacGregor =

American politician (1922–2003)

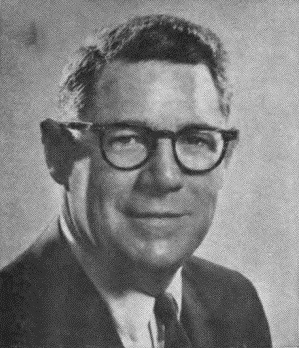

Member of the U.S. House of Representatives from Minnesota's 3rd district
- In office January 3, 1961 – January 3, 1971
- Preceded by: Roy Wier
- Succeeded by: Bill Frenzel

Personal details
- Born: Clark MacGregor; July 12, 1922 Minneapolis, Minnesota, U.S.
- Died: February 10, 2003 (aged 80) Pompano Beach, Florida, U.S.
- Party: Republican
- Spouse: Barbara Spicer
- Education: Dartmouth College (BA); University of Minnesota (JD)

Military service
- Allegiance: United States
- Branch/service: United States Army
- Years of service: 1942–1945
- Rank: Major

Clark MacGregor (July 12, 1922 – February 10, 2003) was an American politician. A member of the Republican Party, he served as the U.S. representative from Minnesota's 3rd congressional district from 1961 to 1971.

After his time in Congress, MacGregor worked as a senior assistant to President Richard Nixon, including as chairman of the president’s successful 1972 re-election campaign.

== Life and career ==
MacGregor was born in Minneapolis, Minnesota, and graduated cum laude from Dartmouth College in 1944 and the University of Minnesota Law School in 1946. In 1949, he married Barbara Spicer; they had three daughters. Clark and Barbara were married until his death.

=== Congress ===
He was elected to the U.S. House of Representatives in 1960, defeating six-term Democratic incumbent Roy Wier, and served in the 87th, 88th, 89th, 90th, and 91st congresses, January 3, 1961 – January 3, 1971.

In 1963, MacGregor appeared in a satirical revue by Dudley Riggs' Brave New Workshop. He was a delegate to the 1964 and 1968 Republican National Convention from Minnesota. He was an unsuccessful candidate for U.S. Senator from Minnesota in 1970, losing to former Democratic Vice President Hubert Humphrey. Initially expecting to run against the incumbent senator, Eugene McCarthy, MacGregor later said privately that he would not have entered the race had he known he would be running against Humphrey.

MacGregor voted in favor of the Civil Rights Acts of 1964, and 1968, as well as the 24th Amendment to the U.S. Constitution and the Voting Rights Act of 1965.

=== Nixon White House ===
MacGregor was Assistant to Richard Nixon for congressional relations in 1970, Counsel to the President on congressional relations (1971–1972), Chairman of the Committee to Re-elect the President (July to November 1972) following John Mitchell's resignation from the position in the Watergate political scandal. In October 1972, as the reporting of Bob Woodward and Carl Bernstein began to piece together the extent of the spying and sabotage program of the Nixon campaign, MacGregor in a press conference attacked The Washington Post for allegedly "Using innuendo, third-person hearsay, unsubstantiated charges, anonymous sources, and huge scare headlines ... maliciously ... to give the appearance of a direct connection between the White House and the Watergate -- a charge the Post knows -- and a half dozen investigations have found -- to be false."

=== Later career and death ===
After 1973, he left politics. He continued to live in Washington, D.C., worked for United Technologies Corporation, and was on the boards of the National Symphony Orchestra and the Wolf Trap Foundation.

During a vacation in Pompano Beach, Florida in 2003, MacGregor died from respiratory failure.

U.S. House of Representatives
Preceded by Roy Wier	Member of the U.S. House of Representatives from Minnesota's 3rd congressional district 1961–1971	Succeeded by Bill Frenzel
Party political offices
Preceded by Wheelock Whitney Jr.	Republican nominee for U.S. Senator from Minnesota (Class 1); 1970	Succeeded by Gerald Brekke
