= Roy Wier =

American politician

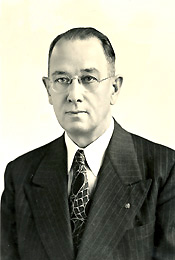

Member of the U.S. House of Representatives from Minnesota's 3rd district
- In office January 3, 1949 – January 3, 1961
- Preceded by: George MacKinnon
- Succeeded by: Clark MacGregor

Member of the Minnesota House of Representatives from the 29th district
- In office January 3, 1933 – January 2, 1939
- Preceded by: Henry Johnson and Burton Kingsley
- Succeeded by: Emmett Duemke and George MacKinnon

Personal details
- Born: Roy William Wier; February 25, 1888 Redfield, South Dakota, U.S.
- Died: June 27, 1963 (aged 75) Seattle, Washington, U.S.
- Party: Minnesota Democratic-Farmer-Labor Party

Military service
- Branch/service: United States Army
- Years of service: 1917-1918

Roy William Wier (February 25, 1888 – June 27, 1963) was a U.S. representative from Minnesota.

Wier was born in Redfield, South Dakota, February 25, 1888. He moved with his parents in 1896 to Minneapolis, Minnesota, and attended the public schools and North High School. He learned the telephone and electrical trade, later going into theatrical stage-lighting work.

During World War I Wier served in the United States Army for eighteen months, with overseas service. In 1920 he became active in the trade-union movement in Minneapolis and was an official representative of the Trades and Labor Assembly of Minneapolis. Wier was a member of the Minnesota House of Representatives, 1933 – 1939; of the Minneapolis Board of Education, 1939 – 1948, and of the board of directors of the Hennepin County Red Cross.

He was elected as a member of the Democratic-Farmer-Labor Party to the 81st through the 86th Congresses (January 3, 1949 – January 3, 1961). He was unsuccessful for reelection in 1960.

Wier was a resident of Minneapolis until May 1962, when he moved to Edmonds, Washington. He died in Seattle, Washington, June 27, 1963; his remains were cremated and the ashes deposited in the columbarium of Evergreen Washelli Cemetery.

U.S. House of Representatives
Preceded by George MacKinnon	U.S. Representative from Minnesota's 3rd congressional district 1949–1961	Succeeded by Clark MacGregor
