= 1970 United States Senate election in Minnesota =

- November 3, 1970
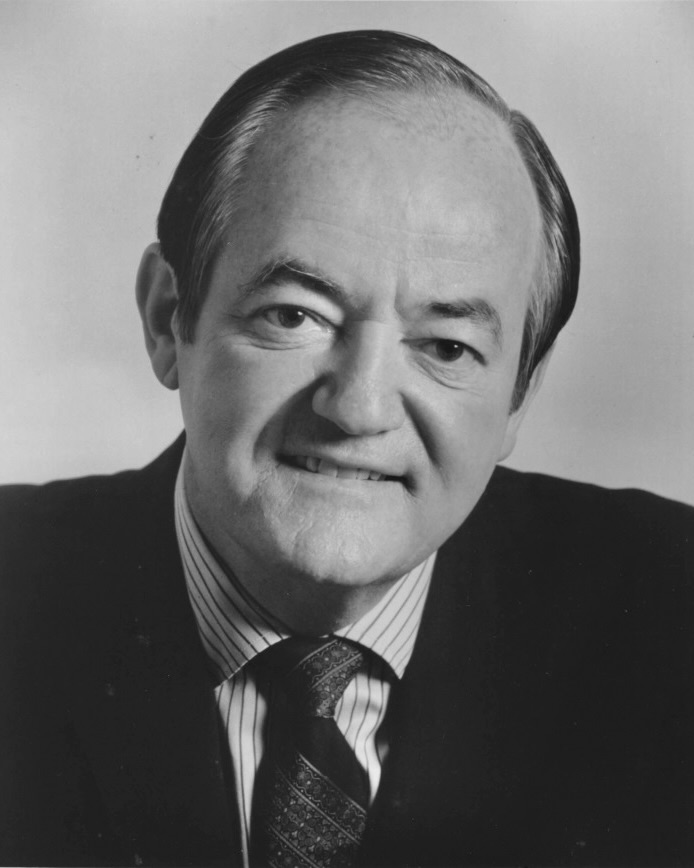

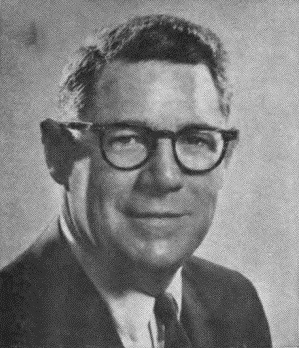
Nominee	Hubert Humphrey	Clark MacGregor
Party	Democratic (DFL)	Republican
Popular vote	788,256	568,025
Percentage	57.75%	41.62%
- County results Humphrey: 40–50% 50–60% 60–70% 70–80% MacGregor: 50–60%
U.S. senator before election
Eugene J. McCarthy
Democratic (DFL)
Elected U.S. Senator
Hubert H. Humphrey
Democratic (DFL)

The 1970 United States Senate election in Minnesota took place on November 3, 1970. Incumbent Democratic U.S. Senator Eugene McCarthy opted not to seek reelection. Former Democratic U.S. Senator, former Vice President and 1968 presidential nominee Hubert Humphrey defeated Republican U.S. Representative Clark MacGregor.

== Democratic–Farmer–Labor primary ==
=== Candidates ===
==== Declared ====
- Earl D. Craig
- Hubert H. Humphrey, Democratic nominee for president in 1968, former Vice President of the United States (1965–1969), former U.S. Senator (1949–1964)

=== Results ===
Democratic primary election results
Party	Candidate	Votes	%
Democratic (DFL)	Hubert H. Humphrey	338,705	79.25%
Democratic (DFL)	Earl D. Craig	88,709	20.76%
Total votes		427,414	100.00%

== Republican primary ==
=== Candidates ===
==== Declared ====
- John D. Baucom
- Clark MacGregor, U.S. Representative from Minnesota's 3rd congressional district since 1961

=== Results ===
Republican primary election results
Party	Candidate	Votes	%
Republican	Clark MacGregor	220,353	93.31%
Republican	John D. Baucom	15,797	6.69%
Total votes		236,150	100.00%

== General election ==
=== Results ===
General election results
Party	Candidate	Votes	%
Democratic (DFL)	Hubert H. Humphrey	788,256	57.75%
Republican	Clark MacGregor	568,025	41.62%
Socialist Workers	Nancy Strebe	6,122	0.45%
Industrial Government	William Braatz	2,484	0.18%
Total votes		1,364,887	100.00%
Majority		220,231	16.14%
Democratic (DFL) hold			

== See also ==
- 1970 United States Senate elections
