= Jack Kroll (labor leader) =

American labor leader (1885–1971)

- Born: June 10, 1885; London, England, U.K
- Died: May 26, 1971 (aged 85); Cincinnati, Ohio, U.S.
- Occupation: Labor leader

Jack Kroll (June 10, 1885 – May 26, 1971) was a 20th-century London-born American labor leader. He served as vice president (1928–1966) of the Amalgamated Clothing Workers of America (ACW) under Sidney Hillman, affiliated throughout with either the AFL or CIO or merged AFL–CIO. He also was head of the CIO-PAC (1946–1955), and was close to U.S. Presidents Franklin Delano Roosevelt and Harry S. Truman.

== Background ==
Jack Kroll was born in London, United Kingdom, on June 10, 1885 and came with his family to the United States of America in 1886. He became an American citizen in 1892 and studied in public schools in Rochester, New York, from 1890 to 1900.

== Career ==
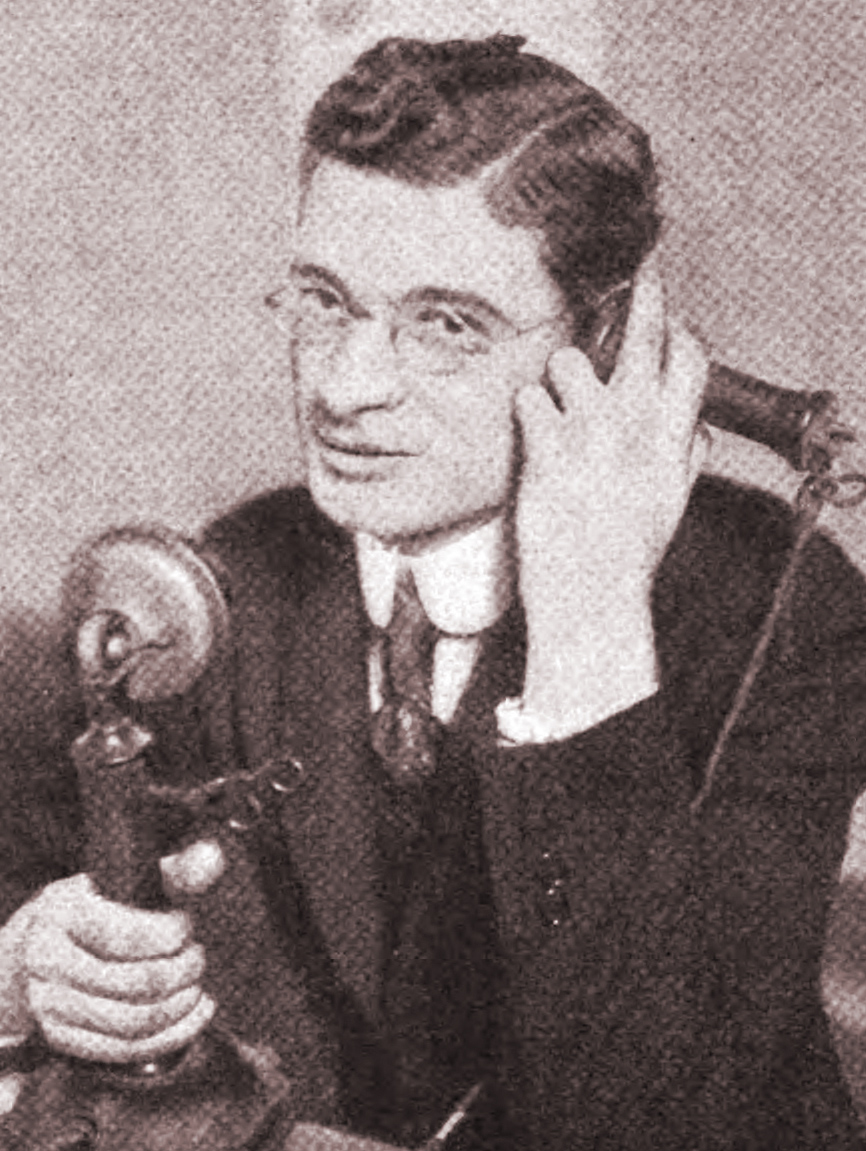
Sidney Hillman (1922), shortly after Kroll began working for him at the ACW

In 1901, Kroll became a clothing cutter, first in Rochester, then in Chicago in 1901. By 1910, he had become a volunteer labor organizer. In 1920, he joined the Amalgamated Clothing Workers (ACW), founded in 1914 by Sidney Hillman. He worked in the New York City office.

By 1928, Kroll had become ACW vice president.

In 1946, he succeeded Hillman as chair of the CIO-PAC. When the CIO reunited with the AFL to form the AFL–CIO in 1955, Kroll became co‐director of AFL–CIO Committee on Political Education.

In addition to his national role, Kroll was an early member of the board of directors of a Democrat-Republican "City Charter Committee" in Cincinnati as well as president of the Ohio CIO council (1932–1952).

== Personal and death ==
In 1920, Jack Kroll married Sara Sylvia Ruben, whom he had met the year before on a picket line.

He was a member of Histadrut (Zionist labor organization). He was also of Rockdale Temple in Cincinnati.

Kroll died age 85 in Cincinnati, Ohio, survived by his wife, son, and five grandchildren.

== Legacy ==
Kroll was the "political arm" of Sidney Hillman.

== See also ==
- Amalgamated Clothing Workers of America
- Sidney Hillman
- American Federation of Labor
- Congress of Industrial Organizations
- CIO-PAC
- AFL–CIO
