= United States Senate Select Committee on Disarmament =

The United States Senate Select Committee on Disarmament was a committee organized in the U.S. Senate. It has since been disbanded.
