= List of elections in 1954 =

The following elections occurred in the year 1954.

== Africa ==
- French legislative by-election, 1954 (Guinea)
- 1954 Southern Rhodesian general election
- 1954 Gold Coast legislative election

== Asia ==
- 1954 Iranian legislative election
- June 1954 Iraqi parliamentary election
- September 1954 Iraqi parliamentary election
- 1954 Jordanian general election
- 1954 Malayan local elections
- 1954 Mongolian parliamentary election
- 1954 Taiwan presidential election
- 1954 Saudi Arabian municipal elections
- 1954 South Korean legislative election
- 1954 Soviet Union legislative election
- 1954 Syrian parliamentary election
- 1954 Turkish general election
- 1954 Turkish presidential election

== Europe ==
- 1954 Albanian parliamentary election
- 1954 Czechoslovak parliamentary election
- 1954 East German general election
- 1954 East German referendum
- 1954 Danish local elections
- 1954 Faroese general election
- 1954 Irish general election
- 1954 Liechtenstein local elections
- 1954 Luxembourg general election
- 1954 Monegasque general election
- 1954 Slovak parliamentary election
- 1954 Soviet Union legislative election
- 1954 Swiss referendums
- 1954 Turkish general election
- 1954 Turkish presidential election
- 1954 West German presidential election

=== United Kingdom ===
- 1954 Aldershot by-election
- 1954 Armagh by-election
- 1954 Arundel and Shoreham by-election
- 1954 Bournemouth West by-election
- 1954 Croydon East by-election
- 1954 Edinburgh East by-election
- 1954 Harrogate by-election
- 1954 Ilford North by-election
- 1954 Inverness by-election
- 1954 Liverpool West Derby by-election
- 1954 Morpeth by-election
- 1954 Motherwell by-election
- 1954 Shoreditch and Finsbury by-election
- 1954 Wakefield by-election

== North America ==
- 1954 Guatemalan general election
- 1954 Salvadoran legislative election

=== Canada ===
- 1954 Edmonton municipal election
- 1954 Northwest Territories general election
- 1954 Ottawa municipal election
- 1954 Toronto municipal election

=== Caribbean ===
- 1954 Cuban general election
- 1954 Netherlands Antilles general election

=== United States ===
- 1954 New York state election
- 1954 United States elections

==== United States lieutenant gubernatorial ====
- 1954 California lieutenant gubernatorial election
- 1954 Connecticut lieutenant gubernatorial election
- 1954 Georgia lieutenant gubernatorial election
- 1954 Minnesota lieutenant gubernatorial election
- 1954 Nebraska lieutenant gubernatorial election
- 1954 Texas lieutenant gubernatorial election
- 1954 Wisconsin lieutenant gubernatorial election

==== United States gubernatorial ====
- 1954 Alabama gubernatorial election
- 1954 Arizona gubernatorial election
- 1954 Arkansas gubernatorial election
- 1954 California gubernatorial election
- 1954 Colorado gubernatorial election
- 1954 Connecticut gubernatorial election
- 1954 Florida gubernatorial special election
- 1954 Georgia gubernatorial election
- 1954 Idaho gubernatorial election
- 1954 Iowa gubernatorial election
- 1954 Kansas gubernatorial election
- 1954 Maine gubernatorial election
- 1954 Maryland gubernatorial election
- 1954 Massachusetts gubernatorial election
- 1954 Michigan gubernatorial election
- 1954 Minnesota gubernatorial election
- 1954 Nebraska gubernatorial election
- 1954 Nevada gubernatorial election
- 1954 New Hampshire gubernatorial election
- 1954 New Mexico gubernatorial election
- 1954 New York gubernatorial election
- 1954 North Dakota gubernatorial election
- 1954 Ohio gubernatorial election
- 1954 Oklahoma gubernatorial election
- 1954 Oregon gubernatorial election
- 1954 Pennsylvania gubernatorial election
- 1954 Rhode Island gubernatorial election
- 1954 South Carolina gubernatorial election
- 1954 South Dakota gubernatorial election
- 1954 Tennessee gubernatorial election
- 1954 Texas gubernatorial election
- 1954 United States gubernatorial elections
- 1954 Vermont gubernatorial election
- 1954 Wisconsin gubernatorial election
- 1954 Wyoming gubernatorial election

==== United States House of Representatives ====
- 1954 United States House of Representatives elections

==== United States Senate ====
- 1954 United States Senate elections
- 1954 United States Senate election in Alabama
- 1954 United States Senate election in Arkansas
- 1954 United States Senate special election in California
- 1954 United States Senate election in Colorado
- 1954 United States Senate election in Delaware
- 1954 United States Senate election in Georgia
- 1954 United States Senate election in Idaho
- 1954 United States Senate election in Illinois
- 1954 United States Senate election in Iowa
- 1954 United States Senate election in Kansas
- 1954 United States Senate election in Kentucky
- 1954 United States Senate election in Louisiana
- 1954 United States Senate election in Maine
- 1954 United States Senate election in Massachusetts
- 1954 United States Senate election in Michigan
- 1954 United States Senate election in Minnesota
- 1954 United States Senate election in Mississippi
- 1954 United States Senate election in Montana
- 1954 United States Senate elections in Nebraska
- 1954 United States Senate special election in Nebraska
- 1954 United States Senate special election in Nevada
- 1954 United States Senate election in New Hampshire
- 1954 United States Senate special election in New Hampshire
- 1954 United States Senate election in New Jersey
- 1954 United States Senate election in North Carolina
- 1954 United States Senate special election in Ohio
- 1954 United States Senate election in Oklahoma
- 1954 United States Senate election in Rhode Island
- 1954 United States Senate election in South Carolina
- 1954 United States Senate election in South Dakota
- 1954 United States Senate election in Tennessee
- 1954 United States Senate election in Texas
- 1954 United States Senate election in Virginia
- 1954 United States Senate election in West Virginia
- 1954 United States Senate elections in Wyoming

==== United States mayoral elections ====
- 1954 Sioux Falls mayoral election

== South America ==
- 1954 Argentine legislative and vice-presidential election
- 1954 Brazilian legislative election
- 1954 Ecuadorian parliamentary election
- 1954 Guatemalan general election
- 1954 Honduran general election
- 1954 Paraguayan presidential election
- 1954 Salvadoran legislative election
- 1954 Uruguayan general election

== Oceania ==
- 1954 New Zealand general election
- 1954 Australian federal election
