= Metropolitan Stadium =

Baseball stadium in Minnesota, US

- The Met "Met Stadium" "Old Met"
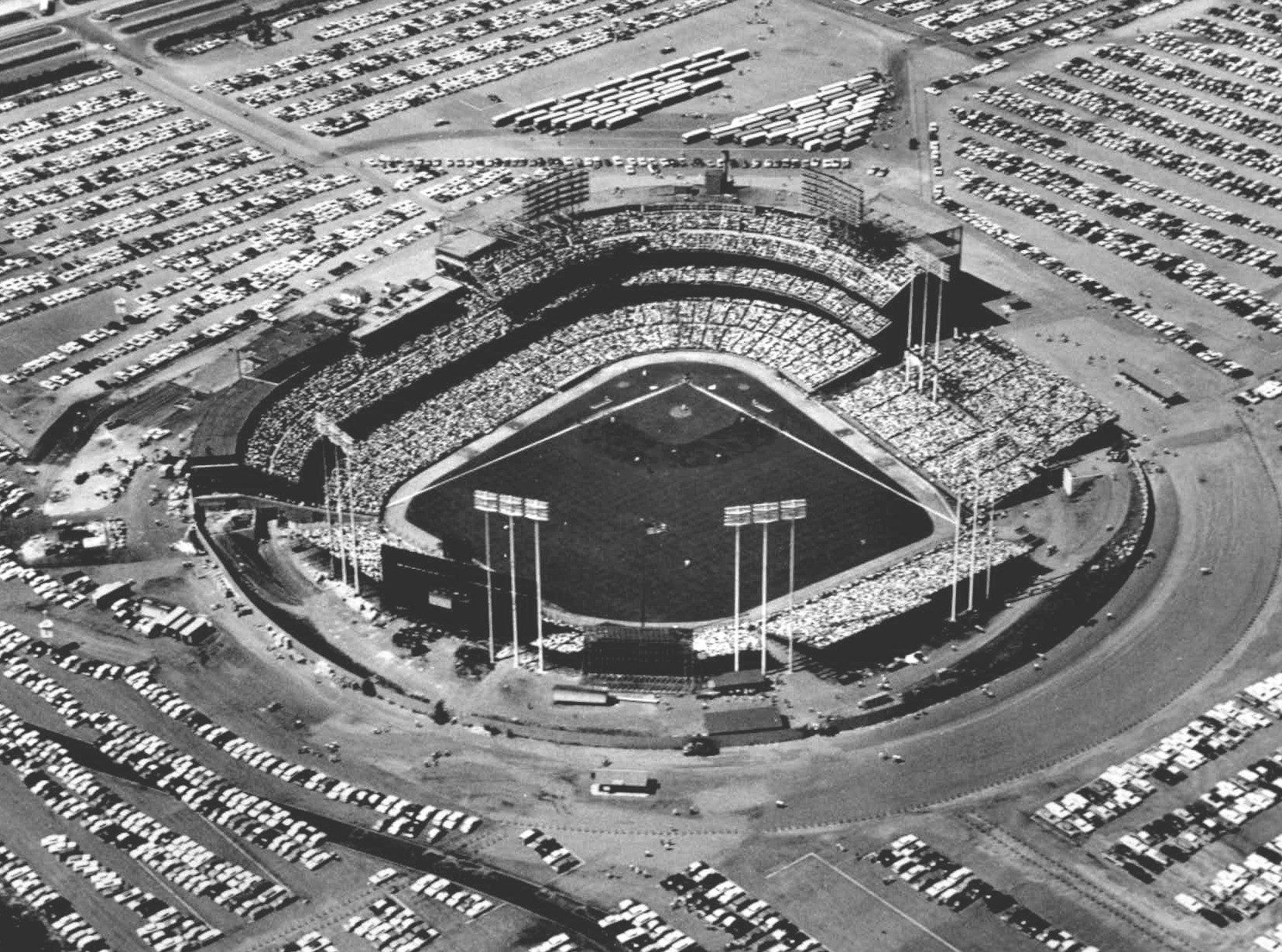
- Aerial view from southeast in 1962

- Location in the United States Location in Minnesota
- Interactive map of Metropolitan Stadium
- Address: 8000 Cedar Avenue South
- Location: Bloomington, Minnesota, U.S.
- Coordinates: 44°51′16″N 93°14′31″W
- Owner: City of Minneapolis (1956–1977); Metropolitan Sports Facilities Commission (1977–1981)
- Capacity: Baseball: 18,200 (1956); 21,000 (1957–1959); 30,022 (1960–1961); 39,525 (1962); 40,073 (1963–1964); 45,182 (1965–1969); 45,914 (1970–1972); 45,921 (1973–1974); 45,919 (1975–1981); Football: 41,200 (1961–1964); 47,900 (1965–1970); 49,784 (1971–1973); 47,900 (1974–1976); 48,446 (1977–1981)
- Surface: Natural grass
- Field size: Left field: 343 ft (105 m); Left-center: 365 ft (111 m); Center field: 402 ft (123 m); Right-center: 370 ft (113 m); Right field: 330 ft (101 m); Backstop: 60 ft (18 m); Wall: 8 feet (2.4 m)

Construction
- Groundbreaking: June 20, 1955
- Opened: April 24, 1956; 70 years ago
- Closed: December 20, 1981
- Demolished: January 28, 1985
- Cost: $8.5 million ($101 million in 2025 dollars)
- Architects: Osborn Architects & Engineers; Foster Dunwiddie of Thorshov and Cerny
- Structural engineer: Tepper Engineering
- General contractors: Johnson, Drake & Piper/Kimmes/Axel Ohman

Tenants
- Minneapolis Millers (AA) 1956–1960; Minnesota Twins (MLB) 1961–1981; Minnesota Vikings (NFL) 1961–1981; Minnesota Kicks (NASL) 1976–1981; Chicago Cardinals (NFL) 1959 (2 games)

Metropolitan Stadium (often referred to as "the Met", "Met Stadium", or now "the Old Met" to distinguish from the Metrodome) was an outdoor sports stadium in the north central United States, located in Bloomington, Minnesota, a suburb of Minneapolis.

The Minneapolis Millers of Minor League Baseball were the original tenant from 1956 to 1960, but Metropolitan Stadium was best known as the home of the American League's Minnesota Twins and the Minnesota Vikings of the National Football League (NFL); both played at the "Met" for 21 seasons, from 1961 through 1981. The Minnesota Kicks of the North American Soccer League (NASL) also played there from 1976 to 1981.

Southwest of the airport, the stadium site is now the Mall of America, which opened in 1992.

== History ==
=== Origins and construction ===
Beginning in 1953, inspired by the Boston Braves' move to Milwaukee, Gerald Moore, the president of the Minneapolis Chamber of Commerce, led the drive to lure a major league team to Minnesota by constructing a modern stadium built to major league specifications. After the rejection of numerous sites, a stadium committee appointed by Moore approved a 160-acre (0.65 km^{2}) plot of farmland in Bloomington. The stadium would replace Nicollet Park as the home of the American Association's Minneapolis Millers. The site was approximately equidistant from the downtowns of Minneapolis and St. Paul, and it was believed this would be the best location for a prospective major league team. Earlier, the 1950 Census indicated that the Twin Cities and their suburbs had over a million people between them, the unofficial threshold for a major metropolitan area.

After a plan by architects Thorshov & Cerny won approval, groundbreaking was scheduled to begin on June 20, 1955. The construction was almost delayed, however, when the owners of the property began a protest, claiming they had not yet been paid. One of these owners created a barricade of farm equipment along his property line that ran directly through the future infield. The dispute was settled in time for the groundbreaking to move forward as planned. Many spectators and dignitaries attended the groundbreaking, including Minneapolis mayor Eric G. Hoyer and several members of the Minneapolis Millers.

On February 7, 1956, an accident occurred on the construction site when a portable heater used to cure concrete exploded in the stadium's basement. After $50,000 of repairs and a three-week delay in construction, Metropolitan Stadium opened in time to hold its first game, a minor league contest between the Millers and the Wichita Braves on April 24 of that year. (At the time of its opening, the stadium still lacked an official name; the park was not named until a July announcement declaring it "Metropolitan Stadium".)

In the 1950s, major league owners Calvin Griffith and Horace Stoneham called the stadium the finest facility in the minors; Stoneham added that "there were not two better" major league stadiums of the time (although not specifying which specific two he thought were the Met's equal) The Millers were then the top farm team of Stoneham's New York Giants, and there was some hope or expectation that the Giants might relocate there. Under major league rules of the time, by virtue of owning the Millers, the Giants owned the major league rights to Minneapolis. Negotiations were also held with Griffith's Washington Senators, as well as the Cincinnati Reds, Cleveland Indians, and Philadelphia Athletics. However, the Giants chose to follow the Brooklyn Dodgers to the west coast at the urging of Dodgers owner Walter O'Malley, who owned the Millers' crosstown rivals, the St. Paul Saints. San Francisco had long been home to the Pacific Coast League's San Francisco Seals, the top farm team of the Boston Red Sox. As part of the deal, the Millers' parent team then became the Red Sox, who had no plans to move anywhere in the foreseeable future.

Multiple exhibition games featuring Major League teams were held at the Met at this time; a game between the Detroit Tigers and Cincinnati Reds was held at the Met in 1957, another between the San Francisco Giants and Chicago White Sox in May, 1958, and a matchup between the Senators and the Philadelphia Phillies was held shortly after the 1958 All-Star break. The latter game brought 15,990 fans to the stadium, including Calvin Griffith, who described the stadium as "terrific."

=== Baseball and American football ===
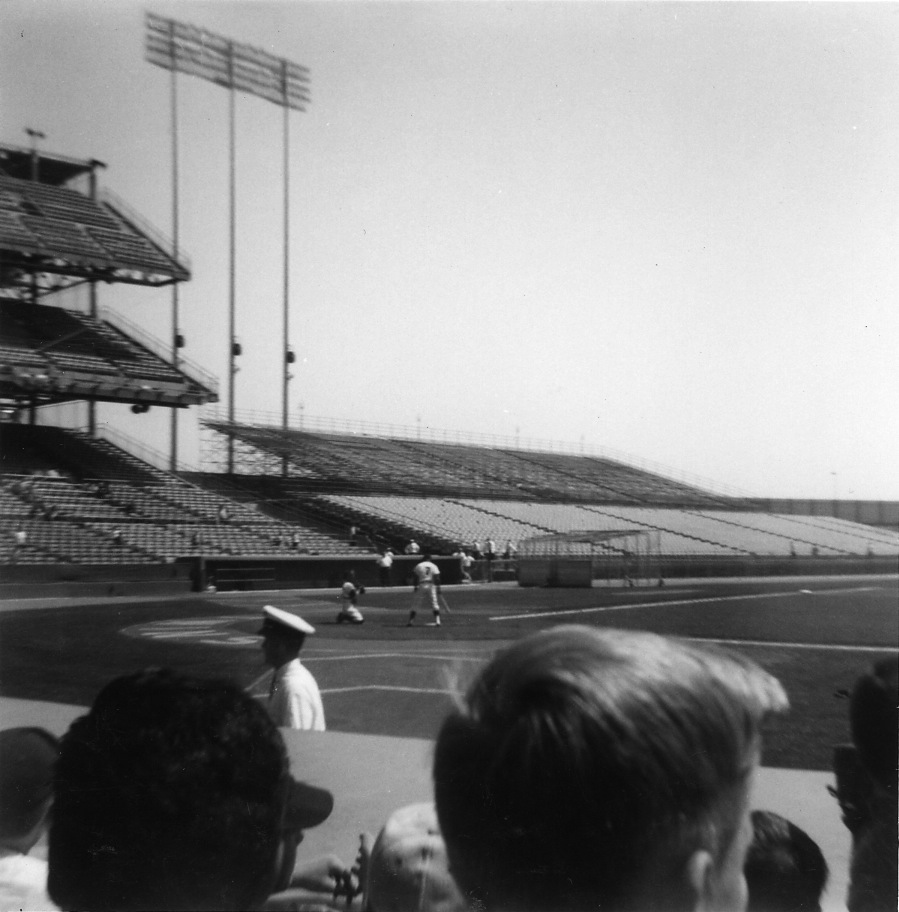
Batting practice in 1963

In October 1960, Calvin Griffith announced that his Washington Senators would move to Metropolitan Stadium as the Minnesota Twins. The Twins played their first home game on April 21, 1961, with a loss to the new Washington Senators (now the Texas Rangers). The Millers and Saints were then promptly folded by Major League Baseball. To ready the stadium for the Twins, a $9 million renovation increased the seating capacity from about 22,000 to over 30,000 by the completion of the Twins' inaugural season. During the Twins' first ten seasons at the Met, they outdrew the average American League team each year.

The National Football League (NFL) was also interested in placing a team at the Met. Conversations were had with Violet Bidwill Wolfner, owner of the Chicago Cardinals, about moving her team to the stadium. The Cardinals moved two of their 1959 regular season home games against the Philadelphia Eagles (October 25) (att: 20,112) and New York Giants (November 22) (att: 26,625) to Bloomington. A preseason football game was held each September at the Met for its first five years, 1956 through 1960:

- September 15, 1956 – Pittsburgh Steelers 14 Philadelphia Eagles 12 (att: 14,742)
- September 21, 1957 – Green Bay 10 Pittsburgh 10 (att: 17,226)
- September 21, 1958 – Chicago Cardinals 31 Green Bay 24 (att: 18,520)
- September 20, 1959 – Green Bay 13 Pittsburgh 10 (att: 18,018)
- September 11, 1960 – Green Bay 28 Dallas Cowboys 23 (att: 20,151)

The Met finally got a football team when the new American Football League (AFL) announced Minneapolis–St. Paul as one of its charter cities for the inaugural 1960 season. However, the NFL persuaded the team's owners to pull out of the AFL in January 1960 and join the NFL as an expansion team in 1961, and was later named the Minnesota Vikings.

As it turned out, the year's delay worked to the Vikings' benefit. By the time the team played its first game, the Twins had moved in and The Met had been expanded to befit its new status as a big-league stadium. (The Chicago Cardinals, after playing two games in Bloomington in 1959, announced in March 1960 that they planned to relocate to St. Louis.) The Vikings were a smashing success in their home opener, which saw them shock the Chicago Bears and the rest of the NFL in a 37-13 blowout. Rookie quarterback Fran Tarkenton sparked the victory with four touchdown passes off the bench.

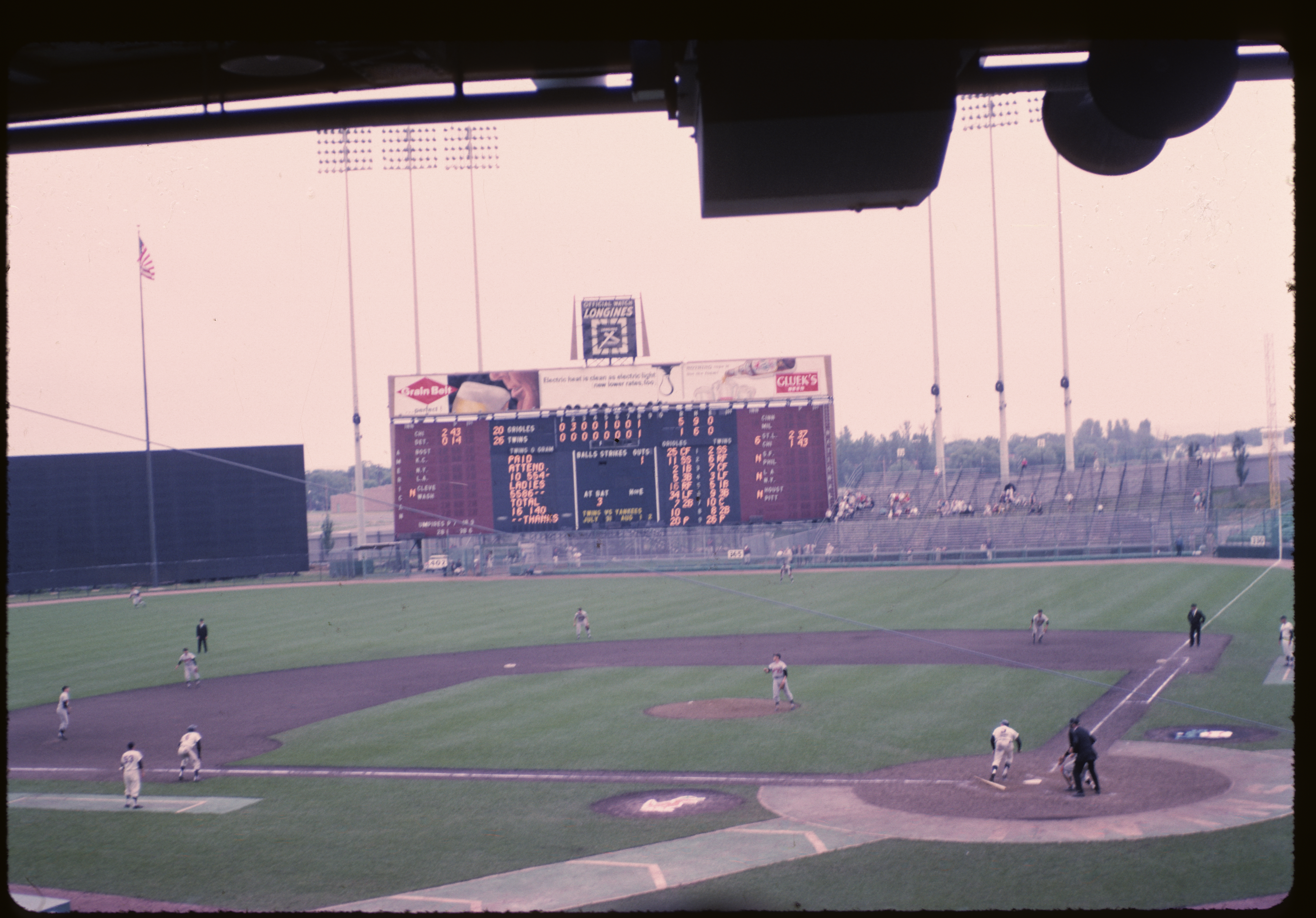
Hosting the Baltimore Orioles on Thursday, July 30, 1964.

The Met had a disjointed, skeletal feel, more than a hint that it had once been a minor league baseball stadium. For instance, when bleachers were erected to expand the stadium for the Twins, no concourse was built to connect them to the rest of the stadium. Due to this design flaw, fans in the bleachers literally had to leave the stadium to get to the grandstand. Unlike most multi-purpose stadiums built during this time, there were very few bad seats for baseball. The stadium was built using cantilever construction for the overhanging decks, eliminating posts that blocked the fans' view. It was well known as a hitter's park; its short foul lines—343 feet (105 m) to left (east), 330 feet (101 m) to right (south)—were particularly friendly to pull hitters such as Harmon Killebrew. The 330 marker in right was actually closer to right-center, leading to speculation that right field was even closer. Since the Met was built in 1956, however, this would not have been a problem for the Twins; baseball required all parks built after 1958 to have foul lines of at least 325 feet (99 m). Met Stadium distance signs included meters 1974–77. The diamond was aligned southeast (home plate to center field); recommended alignment is east-northeast.

The Met was widely considered less than ideal for football. The gridiron ran from around third base to right field (north-south), with barely enough room to fit the playing field and end zones. Wooden bleachers were brought onto the field during football season to bring fans closer to the game. For 1965, a large double-decked grandstand was installed in left field to replace the temporary wooden bleachers. The Vikings actually paid for this new grandstand in return for reduced rent; this location was prime sideline seating in the football configuration. This left the Met with the unique configuration of a double deck in left field, and bleachers behind third base. The left-field grandstand was originally planned to be capable of sliding toward or away from the gridiron (as Denver's Mile High Stadium later would be), but that part of the project was never realized.

The Met provided an overwhelming home-field advantage for the Vikings late in the season and in the playoffs due to Minnesota's famously cold temperatures. The Vikings hosted ten playoff games at the Met and won seven of them.

In the 1965 baseball season, both the All-Star Game and the World Series were played at Metropolitan Stadium, one of the few times that coincidence has happened since the former event was inaugurated in 1933. (Game 7 of that year's World Series drew 50,596 fans to the Met, the only time a baseball crowd exceeded 50,000 and remained its attendance record for baseball.) The Vikings hosted and won the 1969 NFL Championship Game at the stadium, the last NFL game prior to the 1970 merger.

=== Soccer and other events ===
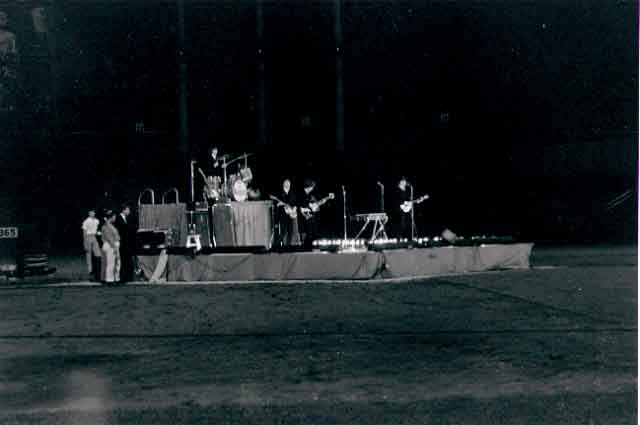

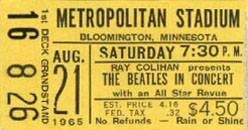
The Beatles at Metropolitan Stadium, August 1965; the ticket was $4.16 plus tax.

Metropolitan Stadium was the home of the Minnesota Kicks soccer team from 1976 until the team folded in November 1981. The Kicks, members of the North American Soccer League (NASL), were highly anticipated in Minnesota and had to delay their first game at the Met by fifteen minutes to accommodate the large crowd waiting to buy tickets. To help speed things along, the Kicks' owners let two thousand fans enter the stadium for free. An NASL attendance record was set one month later, when Pelé and the New York Cosmos drew 46,164 fans to Metropolitan Stadium. Large crowds continued for the Kicks, who drew 41,505 for that year's opening playoff game. Four days later, another record was set when 49,571 fans came to see the Kicks defeat San Jose, 3–1. The team enjoyed great success in their first four seasons in Minnesota, winning a division title each year. Attendance dipped toward the end of the franchise's history, however, with an average of 16,605 per game in 1981, their final season. The size of the field for soccer games was 100 by 72 yards 1976–78 and 104 by 72 yards 1979–81.

==== Concerts ====
The Met also hosted multiple concerts.

Date	Artist	Opening act(s)	Tour / Concert name	Attendance	Revenue	Notes
August 21, 1965	The Beatles	King Curtis; Cannibal and the Headhunters; Brenda Holloway; Sounds Incorporated	1965 North American Tour	25,000	$104,000	"Twist and Shout" was not played due to problems with John Lennon's voice
August 1, 1978	Eagles	Steve Miller Band; Pablo Cruise	1978 Tour	65,000	—	
June 24, 1979	The Allman Brothers Band	—	Enlightened Rogues Tour	—	—	

==== Wrestling ====
Numerous wrestling matches were held at Metropolitan Stadium, including contests featuring Hard Boiled Haggerty, Bob Geigel, Wilbur Snyder, Kay Noble, Lord Littlebrook, Verne Gagne, Gene Kiniski, Rene Goulet, Larry Hennig, Hans Schmidt, Mad Dog Vachon and Dick the Bruiser.

=== Final years and demise ===
Although the Met was responsible for bringing MLB and the NFL to the Twin Cities, it had not aged well. By the early 1970s, the Vikings were making noises about moving out. For instance, there was no prospect of building permanent seats along third base. The Vikings weren't willing to pay to build seats in an area that would have been in the end zone in the football configuration, and the Twins couldn't afford it. At one point, there were plans to place a dome over Metropolitan Stadium, or build a new football stadium located between the Met and the Met Center, which had opened in 1967 just north of the Met. It soon became apparent that, at the very least, the Vikings would need a new stadium. As part of the AFL–NFL merger, the NFL declared that stadiums with less than 50,000 seats were inadequate for its needs; at its height the Met only seated 49,700 people for football (48,400 at the time of closure) and any expansion would have resulted in seats that would have been of no use for the Twins during baseball's regular season. However, the Vikings would not even consider playing at the University of Minnesota's Memorial Stadium even on a temporary basis.

"Runaway Balloon" Incident: At halftime during a Vikings game on December 14, 1969, a hot-air-balloon was being used as a stunt to entertain the crowd but it was improperly tethered and a miscue happened with an 11-year-old boy inside, carrying him about 1,000 feet into the air and then into the frozen Minnesota River. The boy was unharmed, rescued, and was returned to the stadium. Due to the incident, NFL stadiums stopped using hot-air-balloons during breaks from the game. The incident was later dubbed as the "Runaway Balloon".

Discussions for a new stadium actually began in 1970, with six years remaining in both the Twins' and Vikings' leases. While the initial talks focused on a stadium for the Vikings, the Twins quickly joined the discussions. The idea of a dome was particularly appealing to Griffith given the bitterly cold weather that is common in the Twin Cities early and late in baseball season. This accelerated the push for construction of a new stadium, the Hubert H. Humphrey Metrodome, which was completed in 1982.

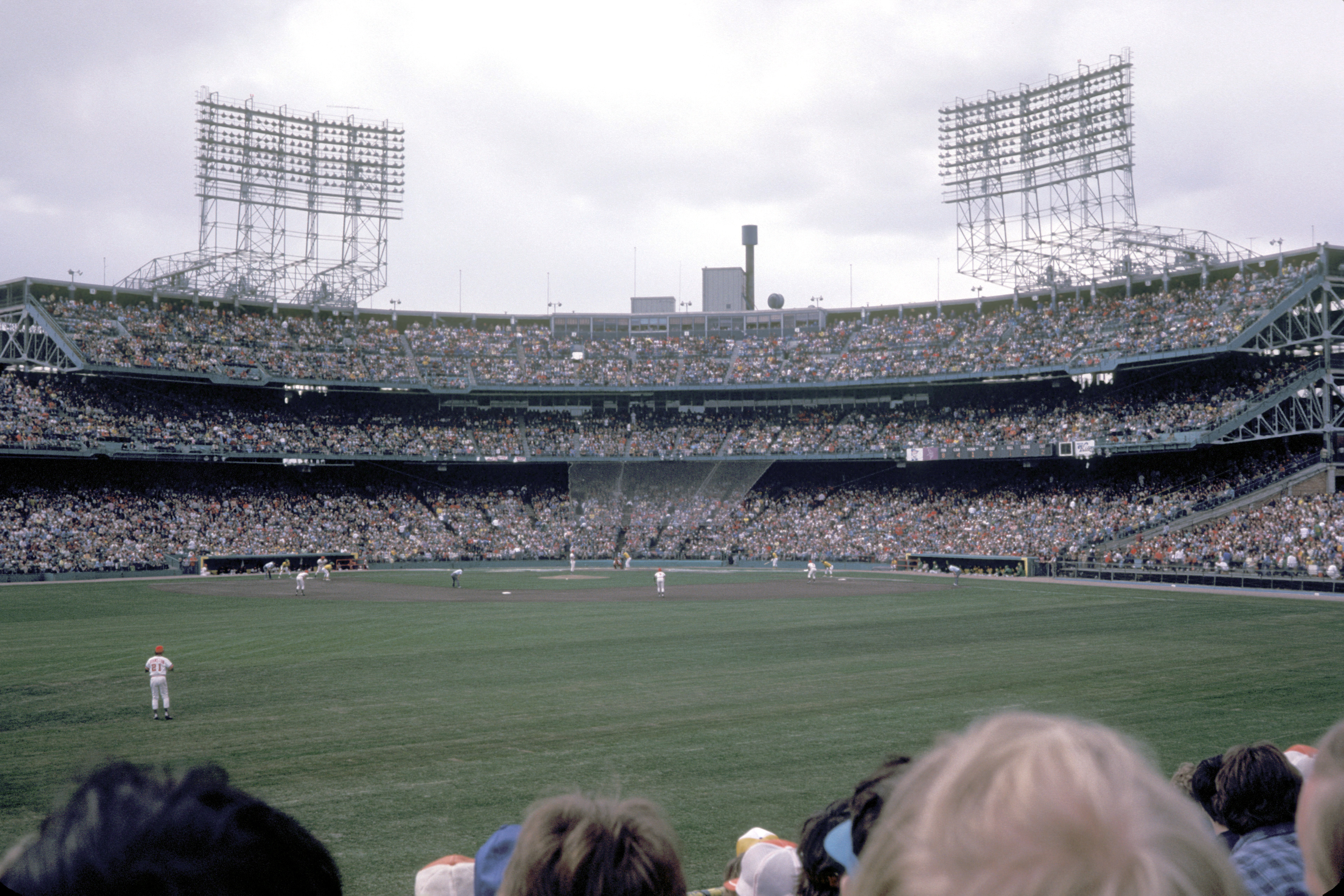
Twins game in July 1981

However, it is very likely that a new stadium would have been needed in any event, as the Met was not well maintained. By the park's final season, broken railings in the grandstand's third deck had become a major safety hazard. Additionally, players had begun to complain about the Met's playing conditions; the infield in particular was considered the worst in the majors. Rumors abounded that the Metropolitan Sports Facilities Commission, which by then had taken over the stadium from the city of Minneapolis, had deliberately let the Met go to seed in order to aid the push for the Metrodome.

The Minnesota Kicks' last regular season game at Met Stadium was a 2–1 victory over the Dallas Tornado on August 19, 1981. A week later, the team's last game at the Met was a 1-0 shoot-out playoff victory over the Tulsa Roughnecks. The team's last game played was a home playoff loss, 3–0 to the Fort Lauderdale Strikers, on September 6, 1981. The game was moved to Memorial Stadium due to a scheduling conflict with the Twins.

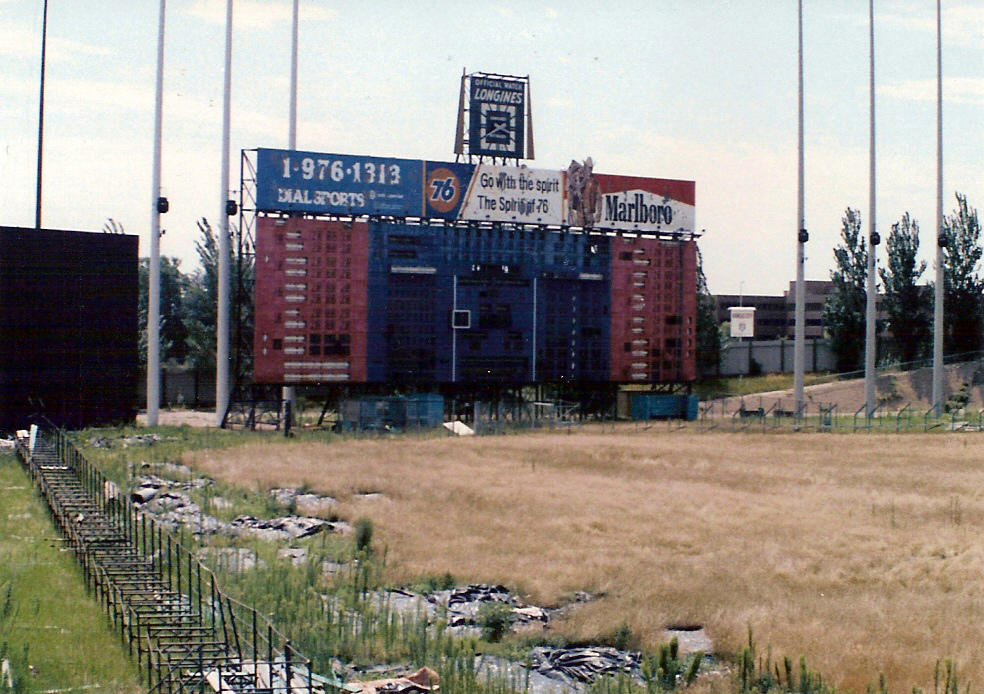
An abandoned Metropolitan Stadium, circa 1984.

The Twins played their last game at the Met on September 30, 1981, losing to the Kansas City Royals 5–2 on a rainy afternoon. The night before the final game, home plate was stolen, and after the final game ended, hundreds of fans gathered on the field, searching (mostly unsuccessfully) for mementos.

The Vikings played their last game on December 20, 1981, dropping a 10–6 decision to the Kansas City Chiefs. By this time, the Vikings had been eliminated from playoff contention. Knowing that fans would be more determined to claim souvenirs at what would almost certainly be the Met’s last major event, the Vikings tripled their security force for the contest. In the game's final minutes, many of the 41,110 fans in attendance began dismantling seats and bleachers, and thousands stormed the field once the game ended. The goal posts were torn down, pieces of the field were dug up, and speakers and lightbulbs on the scoreboard were removed. Hundreds of injuries were reported, mostly minor scrapes and bruises but also multiple head injuries sustained during the melee.

Met Stadium was officially abandoned when the Vikings and the Twins moved to the Metrodome in January 1982, and the Kicks folded after the 1981 soccer season. For the next three years, Met Stadium sat unused, decaying, and highly vandalized. Demolition for Metropolitan Stadium began in 1985 on January 28, and continued for the next four months. After the rubble was cleared, the lot sat vacant for several years, although the nearby Met Center continued to provide entertainment for NHL hockey fans for another decade.

== After the Met ==
The Mall of America, which opened in 1992, stands on the site of what is now nostalgically called "the Old Met." A brass plaque in the shape of home plate, embedded in the floor in the northwest corner of Nickelodeon Universe, commemorates the site's days as a sports venue by marking where home plate once sat. Near the opposite corner, mounted high on the wall, is a red stadium seat from Metropolitan Stadium denoting the precise landing spot (including elevation) of Harmon Killebrew's 520-foot (158 m) home run, a blast to the upper deck in deep left-center field on June 3, 1967. This was the longest homer of Killebrew's career, and the longest ever hit in Metropolitan Stadium. The Met's outfield seating featured green bleacher-style benches and seats, yet the seat the ball hit was painted red and could be seen from all other seats in the stadium.

For a time, there was talk of building a new park for the Twins on the old Met site that would be connected to the Mall of America. However, the terms of the agreement in which the land was sold to Triple Five Group, owners of the Mall of America, do not allow another stadium to be built on the site. Even without this to consider, the site is now directly in a flight path for Minneapolis–Saint Paul International Airport.

The old flagpole at the stadium was purchased by the Minneapolis/Richfield American Legion Post when the stadium was razed. The pole was sold back to the Twins and restored in 2010; it was then placed in the plaza at Target Field.

Gallery of the former Metropolitan Stadium site inside the Mall of America

Plaque commemorating Home plate at Nickelodeon Universe

Plaque commemorating the location of the 50 yard line

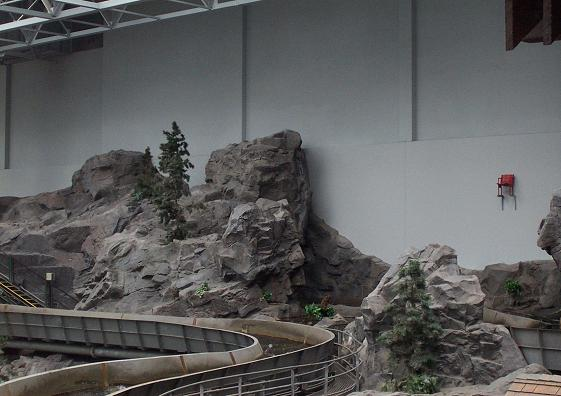
The red seat overlooking the flume ride at Nickelodeon Universe

== Photo gallery: abandonment ==
A series of photographs taken in the mid-1980s during Metropolitan Stadium's abandonment.

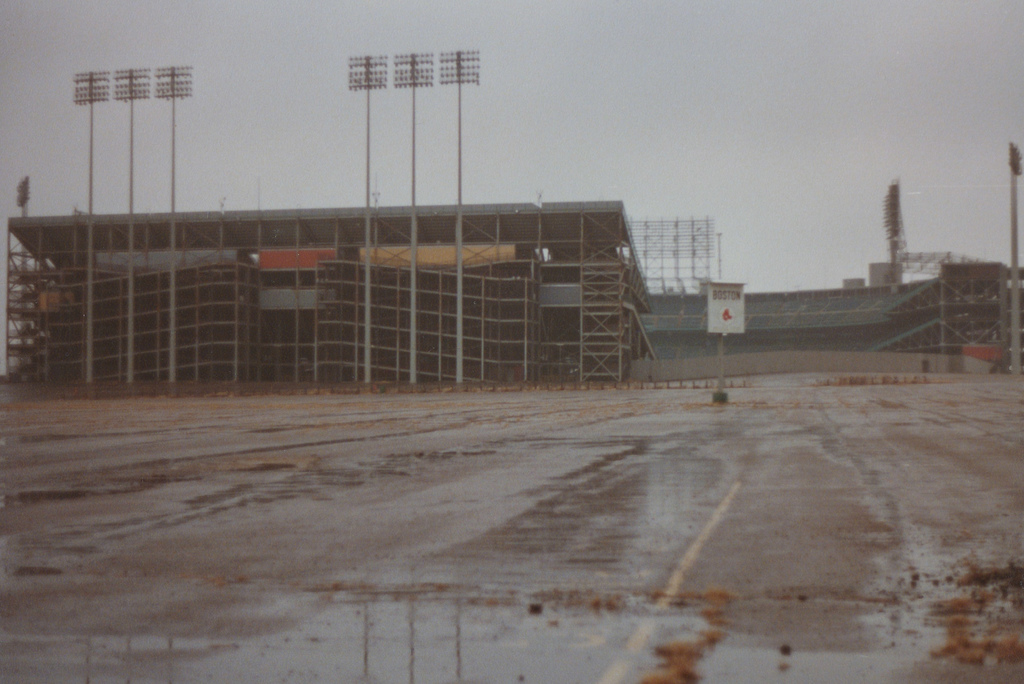

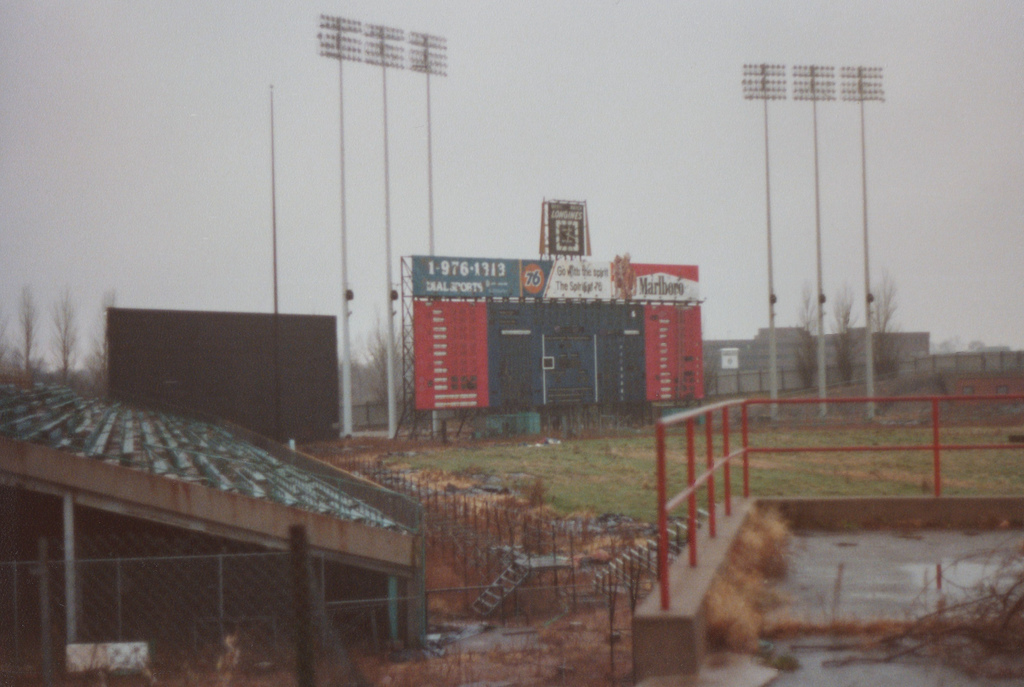

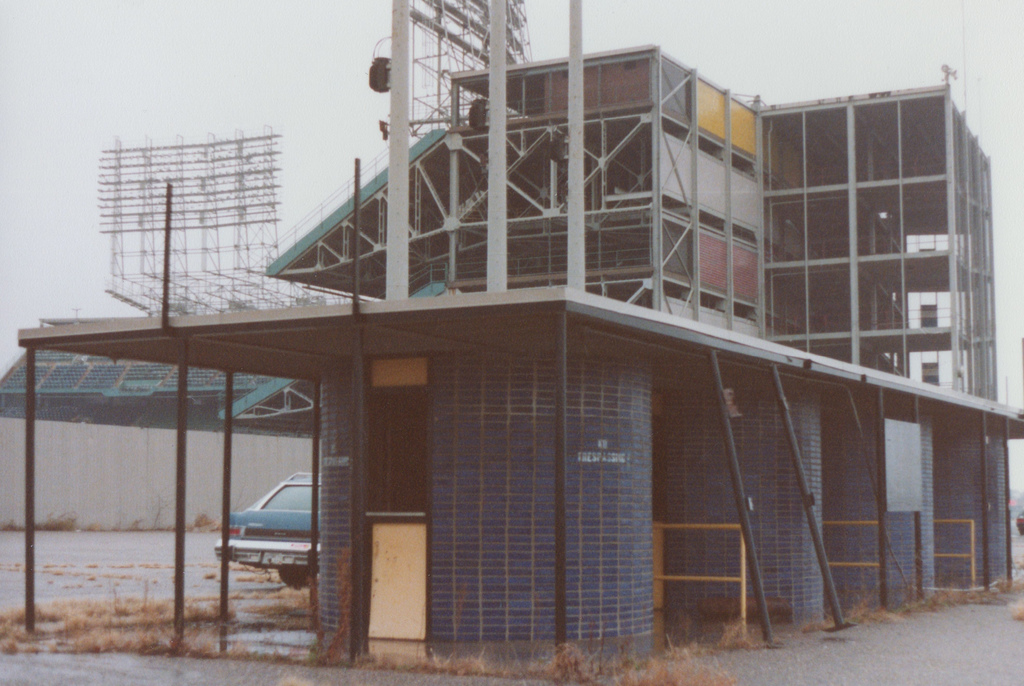

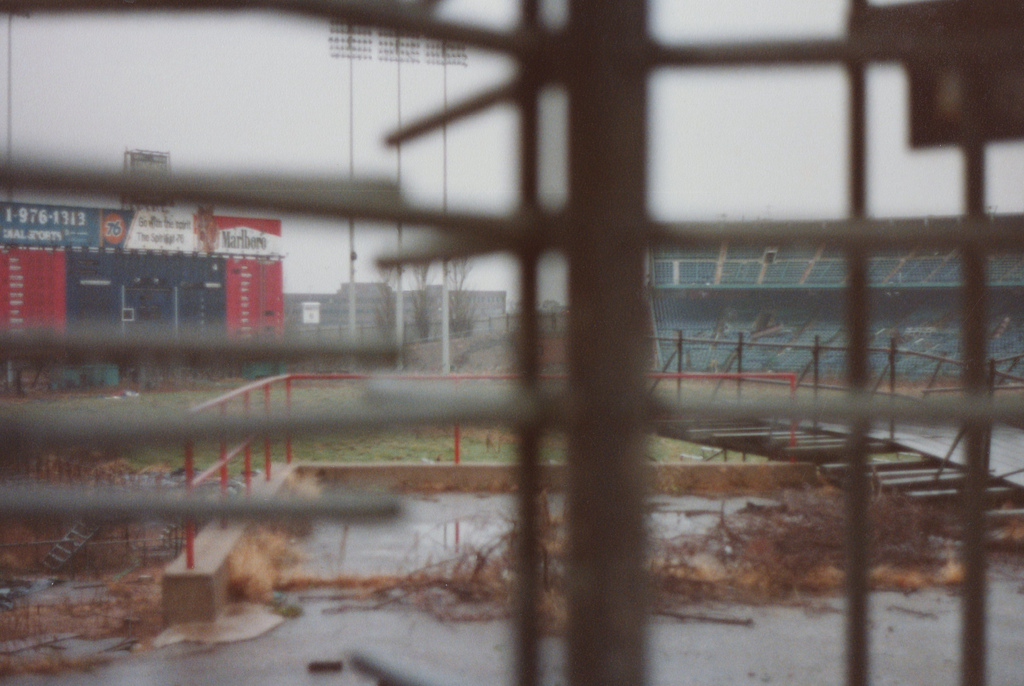

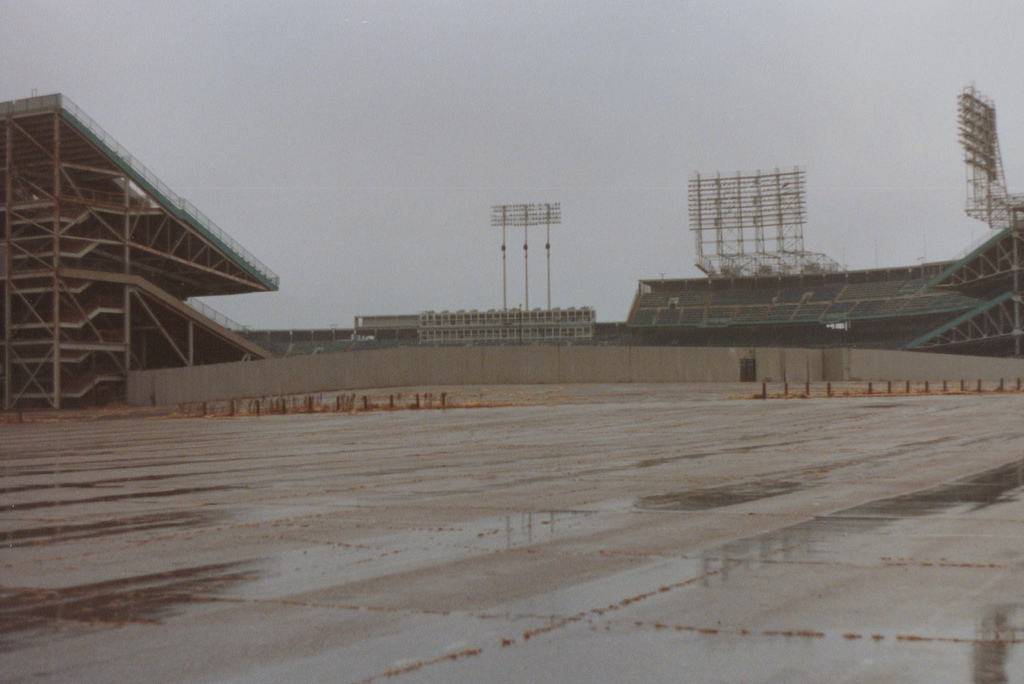

Events and tenants
Preceded by Nicollet Park	Home of the Minneapolis Millers; 1956–1960	Succeeded by none
Preceded by Griffith Stadium	Home of the Minnesota Twins; 1961–1981	Succeeded by Hubert H. Humphrey Metrodome
Preceded by First stadium	Home of the Minnesota Vikings; 1961–1981	Succeeded by Hubert H. Humphrey Metrodome
Preceded by Shea Stadium	Host of the MLB All-Star Game; 1965	Succeeded by Busch Memorial Stadium
Preceded by Texas Stadium; Los Angeles Memorial Coliseum	Host of NFC Championship Game; 1975; 1977	Succeeded by Los Angeles Memorial Coliseum; Texas Stadium
