= Mary Brennan =

Mary Brennan may refer to:

- Mary Brennan (Connecticut politician) (1910–1977), American politician
- Mary Brennan (Florida politician) (born 1954), American politician
- Mary Brennan Karl (1893–1948), American educator
