= 1954 Connecticut lieutenant gubernatorial election =

- November 2, 1954
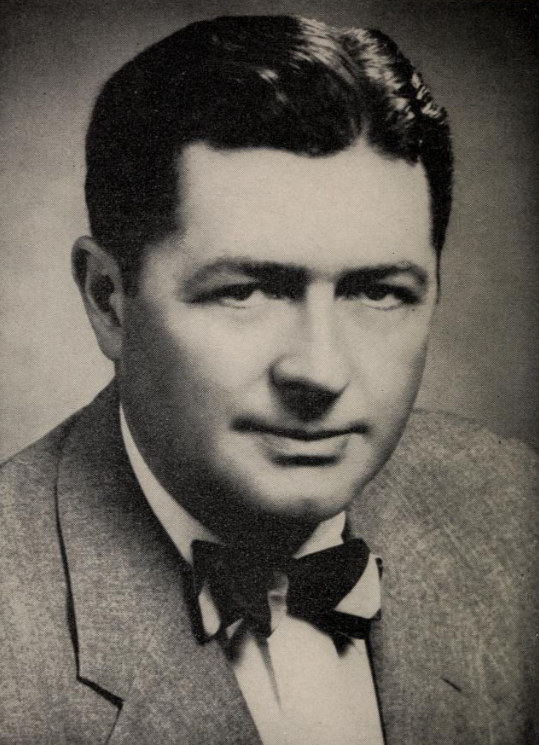

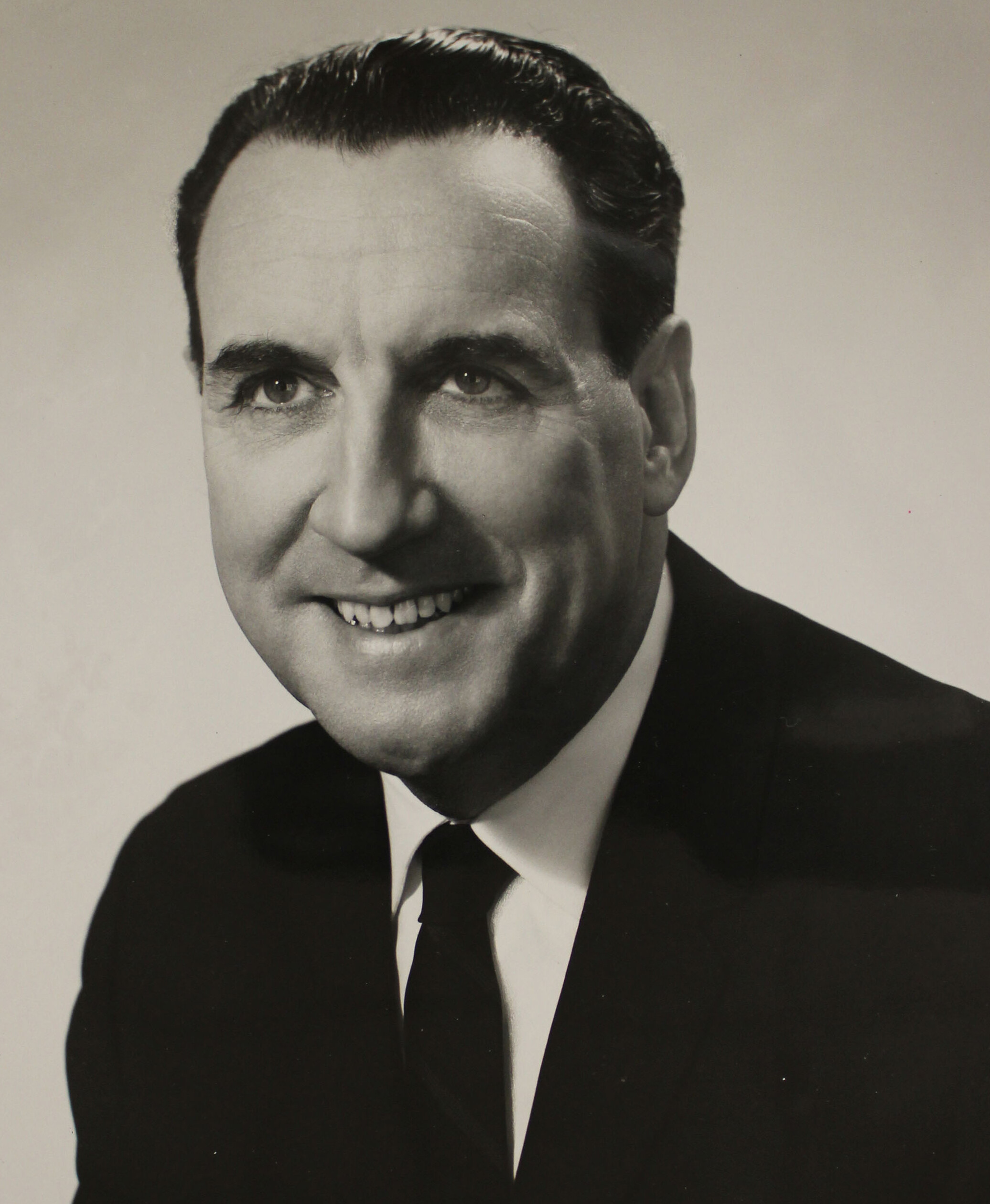
Nominee	Charles W. Jewett	John N. Dempsey
Party	Republican	Democratic
Popular vote	467,472	462,020
Percentage	50.29%	49.71%
- Jewett: 50–60% 60–70% 70–80% 80–90% Dempsey: 50–60% 60–70%
Lieutenant Governor before election
Edward N. Allen
Republican
Elected Lieutenant Governor
Charles W. Jewett
Republican

The 1954 Connecticut lieutenant gubernatorial election was held on November 2, 1954, to elect the lieutenant governor of Connecticut. Incumbent Republican lieutenant governor Edward N. Allen chose not to seek re-election to a second term.

Republican Charles W. Jewett defeated Democratic nominee John N. Dempsey with 50.3% to 49.7% of the vote.

== General election ==
=== Candidates ===
- Republican: Charles W. Jewett, state senator from the 20th district
- Democratic: John N. Dempsey, state representative from Putnam.

=== Results ===
1954 Connecticut lieutenant gubernatorial election
Party	Candidate	Votes	%
Republican	Charles W. Jewett	467,472	50.29%
Democratic	John N. Dempsey	462,020	49.71%
Total votes		929,492	100.00%
Republican hold			
