= Saar referendum =

Saar referendum may refer to

- the 1935 Saar status referendum (or plebiscite),

or to

- the 1955 Saar Statute referendum

For the procedures for initiating other referendums in the German state of Saarland, please see:

- Referendums in Germany#Initiative quorum
