= Referendums in Germany =

Referendums in Germany are an element of direct democracy. On the federal level only two types of a mandatory binding referendum exist – adopting a new constitution and regional referendums in case of restructuring the states. On the state level, all states have various types of statewide and municipal referendums.

== Forms of referendums ==
The German referendum system differentiate between three types.

- Volksbegehren (literally people's request) is a citizens' initiative – if the state parliament ignores the request it could directly lead into a "Volksentscheid"
- Volksbefragung (literally people's inquiry) is a non-binding ballot question and
- Volksentscheid (literally people's decision) is a binding plebiscite.

The term Volksinitiative (people's initiative) is a synonym of Volksbegehren. On the municipal level the three types are paralleled with

- Bürgerbegehren (literally citizens' request) as the local citizens' initiative
- Bürgerbefragung (literally citizens' inquiry) for a local non-binding ballot question and
- Bürgerentscheid (literally citizens' decision) for a local binding plebiscite.

Note that in the city states the state citizens' initiative types are commonly called Bürgerbegehren while being at the same legal level as Volksbegehren in other states. Note that the term "Bürgerinitiative" (literally citizens' initiative) is used informally for non-partisan local campaign organizations (political action groups).

== Federal concept ==
Following World War II West Germany was founded with only minor elements of direct democracy. At the federal level, there are only two mandatory constitutional referendum types. One type is for enacting a new constitution. Changes to the constitution do not require a public vote and there is no provision for an initiative for a constitutional amendment. There has never been a referendum of this type, although there was an argument in that direction during German reunification.

The other type requires a regional public vote in case of restructuring the States (Neugliederung des Bundesgebietes, "New Arrangement of the Federal Territory") which led to a number of effectless referendums to recreate states or change the territory of a state. In addition there was a referendum on the merger of Baden and Württemberg into Baden-Württemberg in 1951 (accepted) and a referendum on the merger of Berlin and Brandenburg into Berlin-Brandenburg in 1996 (rejected).

== Bundesländer ==
Originally, only some of the Bundesländer (federated states of Germany) had provisions for a general binding referendum (Volksentscheid, "people's decision") on popular initiatives (Volksbegehren, "people's request"), with Hesse and Bavaria also having a mandatory binding referendum on changes to the state constitution.

Over the years all states have changed their constitutions to allow various types of statewide and municipal referendums. In all states, there is now a general right for referendums on statewide popular initiatives, which was used in Hamburg to push the state government to pass a law on a facultative binding state referendum in 2007. Most states have a form of non-binding ballot question (Volksbefragung, "people's inquiry") which has rarely been used - the most important of these had been the 1955 Saar Statute referendum. General forms of direct democracy were introduced in the communities with facultative ballot questions (Bürgerbefragung, "citizens' inquiry") and public initiatives (Bürgerbegehren, "citizens' request") which are both non-binding. In some areas, this has been expanded into a binding referendum type (Bürgerentscheid, "citizens' decision").

== Initiative quorum ==
Following World War II the right to petition to the government was installed with high barriers. Any popular initiative had to be filed with the authorities and the signatories have to identify before their signature is accepted. This is called official collection (German: Amtseintragung literally administrative inscription) in most legal areas. The other type is commonly referred to as free collection (German: Freie Sammlung) where letters may be accumulated before being handed over. Naturally some of the latter signatures are found to be illegal which can be a source of dispute.

In order to push the government the initiative must reach a certain amount of valid signatures. The "quorum" is defined differently by each state.

Referendums in Germany by State
State	Legal foundation	Signature quorum / time limit / collection type	Excluded of topics
Baden-Württemberg	Art. 59 und 60 of the state constitution; §§ 25–39 of the Volksabstimmungsgesetz	16.67 % 14 days Official collection	Abgabengesetze, Besoldungsgesetze, Staatshaushaltsgesetz
Bavaria	Art. 18(3), 71, 72(1) und 74 of the state constitution; Art. 63–74 of the Landeswahlgesetz	10 % (1,000,000 when demanding reelections); 14 days Official collection	Staatshaushalt
Bavaria	see also: → de:Volksgesetzgebung in Bayern		
Berlin	Art. 59, 62, 63 of the state constitution; §§ 10–28 of the Abstimmungsgesetz	7% (20% for constitutional changes); 4 months Free collection	Landeshaushaltsgesetz, Abgaben, Tarife öffentlicher Unternehmen, Personalentscheidungen
Berlin	see also: → de:Volksgesetzgebung in Berlin		
Brandenburg	Art. 22 of the state constitution; §§13–25, 56 und 60 of the Volksabstimmungsgesetz	80,000 (200,000 when demanding reelections); 4 months Official Collection	Landeshaushalt, Dienst- und Versorgungsbezüge, Abgaben, Personalentscheidungen
Bremen	Art. 70 und 71 of the state constitution; §§ 8–21 of the "Gesetz über das Verfahren beim Volksentscheid"	10% (20% when demanding constitutional changes or reelections); 3 months Free collection	Haushaltsplan, Dienstbezüge, Steuern, Abgaben, Gebühren
Hamburg	Art. 50 of the state constitution; §§ 6–17 des Volksabstimmungsgesetzes	5 % 21 days Free collection	Bundesratsinitiativen, Haushaltspläne, Abgaben, Tarife der öffentlichen Unternehmen, Dienst- und Versorgungsbezüge
Hamburg	see also: → de:Volksgesetzgebung (Hamburg)		
Hesse	Art. 124 of the state constitution; §§ 1–15 of the Volksbegehrensgesetz	20 % 14 days Official collection	Haushaltsplan, Abgabengesetze, Besoldungsordnungen, Verfassungsänderungen
Mecklenburg-Vorpommern	Art. 60 of the state constitution; §§ 11–17 of the VaG; §§ 1–8 of the Durchführungsverordnung	120,000 no time limit Free collection	Haushaltsgesetze, Abgabengesetze, Besoldungsgesetze
Lower Saxony	Art. 48 of the state constitution; §§ 12–23 of the Volksabstimmungsgesetz; § 62d of the Geschäftsordnung des Landtages	10 % 6 months Free collection	Landeshaushalt, öffentliche Abgaben, Dienst- und Versorgungsbezüge
North Rhine-Westphalia	Art. 2, 68 und 69 of the state constitution; §§ 6–21 of the VIVBVEG; §§ 2–8 of the Durchführungsverordnung VIVBVEG	8 % 8 weeks Official collection	Finanzfragen, Abgabengesetze, Besoldungsordnungen
Rhineland-Palatinate	Art. 107–109 of the state constitution; §§ 61–76 of the Landeswahlgesetz; §§ 75–83 of the Landeswahlordnung	300,000; 2 months Official collection	Finanzfragen, Abgabengesetze, Besoldungsordnung
Saarland	Art. 61, 99 und 100 of the state constitution; §§ 2–13 of the Volksabstimmungsgesetz; §§ 1–7 of the Volksabstimmungsordnung	20 % 14 days Official collection	may not include topics with financial implications, Abgaben, Besoldungen, Staatsleistungen, Staatshaushalt, Verfassungsänderungen
Saxony	Art. 70, 72–74 of the state constitution; §§ 16–25 des VVVG	450.000; 6–8 months Free collection	Abgaben-, Besoldungs-, Haushaltsgesetz
Sachsen-Anhalt	Art. 81 of the state constitution; §§ 10–19 of the Volksabstimmungsgesetz	11 % 6 months Free collection	Haushaltsgesetze, Abgabengesetze, Besoldungsregelungen
Schleswig-Holstein	Art. 42 der state constitution; §§ 11–19 of the Volksabstimmungsgesetz	5 % 6 months Official collection	Landeshaushalt, Dienst- und Versorgungsbezüge, öffentliche Abgaben
Thuringia	Art. 81 und 82 of the state constitution; §§ 9–18 of the "Gesetzes über Verfahren beim Bürgerantrag, Volksbegehren und Volksentscheid"	10% (8%); 4 months (2 months); Freie Sammlung (Amtseintragung)	Landeshaushalt, Dienst- und Versorgungsbezüge, Abgaben und Personalentscheidungen
Federal Republic of Germany	Art. 29 GG Abs. 4–6 of the Basic Law; §§ 14, 24, 26 und 36 of the law on referendums and initiatives ("Gesetzes über das Verfahren bei Volksentscheid, Volksbegehren und Volksbefragung") in 29 GG Abs. 6 GG; §§ 1–45 und 93 of the regulation on conduct ("Verordnung zur Durchführung des Gesetzes nach Art. 29 GG Abs. 6 GG")	10% of the voters in the affected area	the referendum may only target questions of territory changes (see de:Neugliederung des Bundesgebietes")

== Official collection ==
In the context of direct democracy, an official collection of signatures in Germany, refers to the collection of petition signatures for a referendum under supervision in a town hall or at other officially determined locations (normally a government building). This is in contrast to the free collection, where people may sign a petition that is freely circulated by the public. In a few German federal states, official collection is also required by law for the collection of campaign signatures for local elections.

In the German state of Brandenburg as a reaction to the criticism of the official collection, including from the SPD and Die Linke political parties a reform in 2012 created the possibility for municipal administrations to be able to determine further registration offices (e.g. bank and post office branches, shops).

== Notable referendums in Germany ==
=== Federal ===
- 1926 German property expropriation referendum
- 1929 German Young Plan referendum
- 1933 German League of Nations withdrawal referendum
- 1934 German head of state referendum

=== State ===
Territory of the Saar Basin (1920–1935)

- 1935 Saar status referendum

Saar Protectorate (1947–1956)

- 1955 Saar Statute referendum

Eastern Germany (1949–1990)

- 1951 East German referendum
- 1954 East German referendum
- 1968 East German referendum

post-1990 Germany

- 1995 Bavarian referendum on introduction of local referendums
- 1998 Bavarian referendum on the abolition of the Bavarian Senate
- 2010 Bavarian referendum on a smoking ban in gastronomy
- 2011 Baden-Württemberg referendum on Stuttgart 21
- 2011 Berlin water referendum
- 2013 Berlin energy referendum
- 2021 Berlin referendum
