= Gertrude Wood =

American politician (1897–1998)

Member of the Connecticut House of Representatives from Somers
- In office 1947–1951
- Preceded by: Oliver C. Pease; Julia Keeney
- Succeeded by: Mary Brennan; Robert L. Keeney Jr.

Personal details
- Born: 1897 Somersville, Connecticut, U.S.
- Died: January 27, 1998 (aged 100) Somersville, Connecticut, U.S.
- Party: Republican

Gertrude Wood (1897 – January 27, 1998) was an American politician who served in the Connecticut House of Representatives from 1947 to 1951 as one of two representatives from the town of Somers. Wood was a Republican. She served two terms, the first alongside Oliver C. Pease, and the second alongside Arthur Olmsted, both fellow Republicans. Wood was a deacon at the Congregational Church of Somers.
