= Margaret Strekas =

American politician (1913–1987)

- Strekas c. 1939

Member of the Connecticut House of Representatives from Somers
- In office 1953–1961
- Preceded by: Mary Brennan; Robert L. Keeney Jr.
- Succeeded by: Thomas E. Keeney; Dorothy Hutton

Personal details
- Born: Margaret Ann Kumpa; April 10, 1913 Jersey City, New Jersey, U.S.
- Died: October 18, 1987 (aged 74) Springfield, Massachusetts, U.S.
- Party: Republican
- Spouse: Peter Paul Strekas (m. 1939; died 1975)
- Education: Waynesburg College; Columbia University

Margaret Ann Strekas (April 10, 1913 – October 18, 1987) was an American politician who served in the Connecticut House of Representatives from 1953 to 1961, representing the town of Somers as a Republican.

== Personal life and education ==
Margaret Ann Kumpa was born on April 10, 1913 in Jersey City, New Jersey. She graduated from high school in Milford, Pennsylvania, and later attended Waynesburg College and Columbia University. In 1939, she married Peter Paul Strekas and moved to Somers, Connecticut. Peter died in 1975.

== Political career ==
A Republican, Strekas was first elected to the Connecticut House of Representatives in 1952, and she served four terms as one of two representatives from the town of Somers. Throughout her tenure, she served on the Education Committee, the Military and Veterans' Affairs Committee, and the Labor Committee.

== Death ==
Strekas died on October 18, 1987, at Baystate Medical Center in Springfield, Massachusetts. She was 74.
