= 1954 Sioux Falls mayoral election =

- April 20, 1954; April 27, 1954

Candidate	Fay Wheeldon	Henry Saure	Charles E. Enright
Party	Nonpartisan	Nonpartisan	Nonpartisan
First round	3,886; 29.57%	4,871; 37.06%	3,733; 28.41%
Runoff	8,873; 61.30%	5,601; 38.70%	Eliminated
Mayor before election
Henry Saure
Nonpartisan
Elected mayor
Fay Wheeldon
Nonpartisan

The 1954 Sioux Falls mayoral election took place on April 27, 1954, following a primary election on April 20, 1954. Incumbent Mayor Henry Saure ran for re-election to a second term. In the primary election, Saure placed first, winning 37 percent of the vote. Former South Sioux Falls City Commissioner Fay Wheeldon narrowly defeated former corporate executive Charles Enright in the primary, 30–28 percent, to advance to the general election. Wheeldon defeated Saure in a landslide, winning 61 percent of the vote to Saure's 39 percent.

== Primary election ==
=== Candidates ===
- Henry Saure, incumbent Mayor
- Fay Wheeldon, former South Sioux Falls City Commissioner
- Charles E. Enright, former corporate executive
- Gilbert Norbraten, insurance company owner

=== Results ===
1954 Sioux Falls mayoral primary election
Party	Candidate	Votes	%
Nonpartisan	Henry Saure (inc.)	4,871	37.06%
Nonpartisan	Fay Wheeldon	3,886	29.57%
Nonpartisan	Charles E. Enright	3,733	28.41%
Nonpartisan	Gilbert Norbraten	652	4.96%
Total votes		13,142	100.00%

== General election ==
=== Results ===
1954 Sioux Falls mayoral runoff election
Party	Candidate	Votes	%
Nonpartisan	Fay Wheeldon	8,873	61.30%
Nonpartisan	Henry Saure (inc.)	5,601	38.70%
Total votes		14,474	100.00%
