= Yale Club of Hartford =

Regional alumni club of Yale University in Hartford, Connecticut

- Formation: April 8, 1885; 141 years ago
- Type: Non-profit
- Legal status: Non-profit 501(c)(3)
- Headquarters: Hartford, Connecticut
- Members: 2,000+
- President: Bradford W. Galiette
- Main organ: Board of Directors
- Affiliations: Yale University
- Website: www.yaleclubhartford.org

The Yale Club of Hartford, legally incorporated as The Yale Club and Scholarship Foundation of Hartford, Inc., is a regional alumni organization for Yale University graduates and affiliates based in Hartford, Connecticut. Founded in 1885, it is among the oldest Yale alumni clubs in the United States and serves Yale alumni throughout Northern Connecticut.

== History ==
The Yale Club of Hartford traces its origins to April 8, 1885, when approximately 75 Yale alumni gathered in Hartford to establish what was then known as the Yale Alumni Association of Hartford. The organization adopted a constitution at its first meeting and soon became an active center for Yale alumni in the region.

The club was incorporated in 1952 under its current legal name. Throughout its history, the organization has maintained close ties to Yale University and the Hartford community, supporting alumni engagement, student recruitment, and scholarship initiatives.

Author and humorist Mark Twain (Samuel Clemens), who lived in Hartford during the late 19th century, was associated with early club activities and spoke at several meetings. Twain was a personal friend of one of the club's founders and maintained a long-standing interest in Yale University. Other guests have included Connecticut Governors and Lt. Governors Abiram Chamberlain, Simeon E. Baldwin, Wilbur Cross, Raymond Baldwin, Edward Allen, Eunice Groark, and Susan Bysiewicz, Yale University Presidents Arthur Twining Hadley, James Rowland Angell, Charles Seymour, A. Whitney Griswold, Kingman Brewster, A. Bartlett Giamatti, Hanna Holborn Gray, and Peter Salovey, as well as Yale Football greats Walter Camp, Tad Jones, William Herbert "Pa" Corbin, Larry Kelley, Ducky Pond, Howie Odell, Herman Hickman, Levi Jackson, Jordan Olivar, and Carm Cozza, and noted Yale faculty members and senior University leaders such as Assistant Dean Elga Wasserman, Provost Scott Strobel, Chief Research Archivist Judith Schiff, and Professors Donald Kagan, Paul Kennedy, William Lyon Phelps, Jacob Hacker, and Jonathan Feinstein. Members and leaders of the club have also served as executives, founders, and senior leaders of some of the most recognized organizations in Greater Hartford, including Aetna, Connecticut General Life Insurance Company, The Phoenix Companies, Stanley Works, The Travelers Companies, Hartford Medical Society, Day, Berry & Howard, Murtha Cullina, and the Connecticut General Assembly.

== Mission and activities ==
The mission of the Yale Club of Hartford is to strengthen connections between Yale University and its alumni, foster fellowship among members, and support Yale's educational and outreach efforts in Northern Connecticut.

The club organizes a variety of social, educational, and cultural events throughout the year, including alumni networking gatherings, lectures and panel discussions, annual dinners, athletic viewing events, and joint programs with other Ivy League alumni organizations.

== Alumni support and outreach ==
=== Admissions and scholarships ===
Through its participation in Yale College's Alumni Schools Committee, the Yale Club of Hartford assists the university's undergraduate admissions process by interviewing applicants from the local area.

The club also supports academic achievement and college access by sponsoring the Yale Book Award for high school students in the greater Hartford region.

=== Fellowships and internships ===
The organization administers the Frank O. H. Williams Summer Fellowships, which provide paid summer internships for Yale College students from Northern Connecticut. These fellowships place students with nonprofit, public sector, and community organizations in the Hartford area.

The club has also supported short-term fellowships related to historical research and preservation involving Yale University archives and local history.

=== Community engagement ===
The Yale Club of Hartford participates in community-focused initiatives, including support for educational and youth programs such as the Connecticut Invention Convention, where the club sponsors awards and student internships.

== Membership ==
Membership in the Yale Club of Hartford is open to Yale University alumni and their family members. The club represents several thousand alumni in its service area. Membership dues help fund programming, scholarships, and fellowship opportunities, with reduced or waived dues typically offered to recent graduates.

== Organization ==
The Yale Club of Hartford operates as a nonprofit organization recognized as a 501(c)(3) public charity. It is governed by a volunteer board of directors drawn from the local Yale alumni community.

== See also ==
- Yale University
- Yale Alumni Association
- Yale Alumni Regional Clubs
