= Carolyn Cone =

American politician (1899–1990)

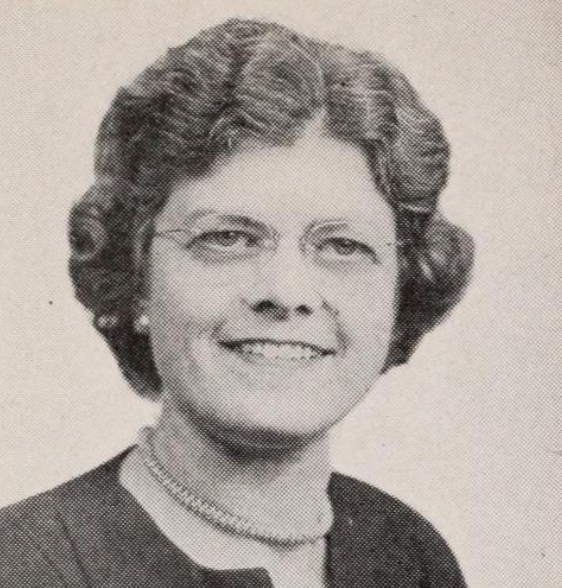
- Cone c. 1946

Member of the Connecticut House of Representatives from Lyme
- In office 1943–1947 Serving with Robert H. Winslow (1943–1945); John E. Russell (1945–1947)
- Preceded by: Charles W. Jewett; Allen Bartman
- Succeeded by: Charles W. Jewett; Ray L. Harding
- In office 1953–1955 Serving with Max F. Brevillier
- Preceded by: Gilbert L. Macpherson; John Mazer
- Succeeded by: Max F. Brevillier; Douglas J. Rathbun
- In office 1961–1963 Serving with Max F. Brevillier
- Preceded by: Max F. Brevillier; John H. Beebe
- Succeeded by: John W. Danforth; William H. Beebe

Personal details
- Born: Carolyn Lampry; December 8, 1899 Providence, Rhode Island, U.S.
- Died: July 20, 1990 (aged 90) Old Saybrook, Connecticut, U.S.
- Party: Republican
- Spouse: Leslie B. Cone (m. 1920; died 1989)
- Children: 2

Carolyn Lampry Cone (December 8, 1899 – July 20, 1990) was an American politician from Connecticut. A Republican, she served in the Connecticut House of Representatives from 1943 to 1947, 1953 to 1955, and 1961 to 1963, representing the town of Lyme.

== Personal life ==
Cone was born in Providence, Rhode Island, on December 8, 1899, to Howard and Estella Sanbourne Lampry. She married Leslie B. Cone on August 14, 1920. They lived in Lyme, Connecticut, and had two children. Leslie died on October 29, 1989.

== Career ==
=== Early career ===
Cone served as treasurer of Lyme from 1929 to 1961. She ran for renomination in July 1961, but was defeated. She was involved with the Connecticut chapter of the Young Republicans and was elected as a national committeewoman in 1943.

=== Connecticut House of Representatives ===
==== Elections ====
Cone was first elected to the Connecticut House of Representatives in 1942, and she served two terms as one of two representatives from the town of Lyme. She served her first term alongside Robert H. Winslow, and the second alongside John E. Russell. Cone did not run for reelection in 1946 and was succeeded by Charles W. Jewett and Ray L. Harding in 1947.

Cone was elected to a third term in 1952, and she represented Lyme alongside Max F. Brevillier from 1953 to 1955. She did not run for reelection and was succeeded by Brevillier and Douglas J. Rathbun. Cone was elected to her fourth term in 1960, and she again served alongside Brevillier from 1961 to 1963. She did not run for reelection in 1962 and was succeeded by John W. Danforth and William H. Beebe.

==== Tenure ====
Cone served on the education committee during all four of her terms in the House. During the 1953 session, she also served as clerk of the elections committee.

== Death ==
Cone died on July 20, 1990, in Old Saybrook, Connecticut. She was 90.
