= Dorothy Hutton (politician) =

American politician (1903–1996)

Member of the Connecticut House of Representatives from Somers
- In office 1961–1967
- Preceded by: Thomas E. Keeney; Margaret Strekas
- Succeeded by: Seat eliminated

Personal details
- Born: Dorothy Estelle Spellman; November 24, 1903 Somers, Connecticut, U.S.
- Died: January 18, 1996 (aged 92) Bloomfield, Connecticut, U.S.
- Party: Republican
- Spouse(s): William A. Hutton (m. 1926; died 1961) Lester E. Shippee (died 1988)
- Children: 2
- Education: Eastern Connecticut State University

Dorothy Estelle Hutton Shippee (November 24, 1903 – January 18, 1996) was an American politician who served in the Connecticut House of Representatives from 1961 to 1967, representing the town of Somers as a Republican.

== Personal life and education ==
Dorothy Estelle Spellman was born on November 24, 1903, in Somers, Connecticut. She was one of six siblings. In 1923, she graduated from Eastern Connecticut State University, then known as the Willimantic State Normal School, and began working as an elementary school teacher in Somers. She married her first husband, William A. Hutton, in 1926, and they had two children together. William died in 1961. She later married Lester E. Shippee, and they were together until his death in 1988.

== Political career ==
Hutton was elected to the Somers Board of Education in 1936 and served on the Connecticut State Board of Education from 1947 to 1959. She was chairman from 1951 to 1959, the first woman to hold the position.

A Republican, Hutton was elected to the Connecticut House of Representatives in 1960 and served as one of two representatives from Somers until 1967. Hutton had no successor as redistricting eliminated the use of single-town districts, beginning with the 1966 election.

== Death ==
Hutton died on January 18, 1996, in Bloomfield, Connecticut. She was 92.
