= Julia Keeney =

American politician (1889–1959)

- Keeney c. 1946

Member of the Connecticut House of Representatives from Somers
- In office 1935–1947 Serving with Chester Worthington (1935–1937); Oliver C. Pease (1937–1947)
- Preceded by: Ensign C. Kibbe; Louis A. Gowdy
- Succeeded by: Oliver C. Pease; Gertrude Wood

Personal details
- Born: Julia Allen; August 26, 1889 Hartford, Connecticut, U.S.
- Died: April 13, 1959 (aged 69) Washington, D.C., U.S.
- Party: Republican
- Spouse: Ralph D. Keeney
- Children: 6
- Relatives: Edward N. Allen (brother)

Julia Allen Keeney (August 26, 1889 – April 13, 1959) was an American politician who served in the Connecticut House of Representatives from 1935 to 1947, representing the town of Somers as a Republican.

== Personal life ==
Keeney was born on August 26, 1889, in Hartford, Connecticut. Her younger brother, Edward N. Allen, served as lieutenant governor of Connecticut from 1951 to 1955. She was married to Ralph D. Keeney, with whom she had six children, including Thomas E. Keeney, who would later serve as a state representative.

== Political career ==
Keeney was first elected to the Connecticut House of Representatives in 1934, and she served six terms representing the town of Somers as a Republican. She served her first term alongside Chester Worthington and the latter five alongside Oliver C. Pease. Keeney was a member of the board of education in Somers. In 1958, she headed U.S. Representative Horace Seely-Brown's reelection campaign.

== Death ==
Keeney died on April 13, 1959, at Washington Hospital Center in Washington, D.C. She was 69.
