= P. Kenneth Peterson =

American politician (1915–1993)

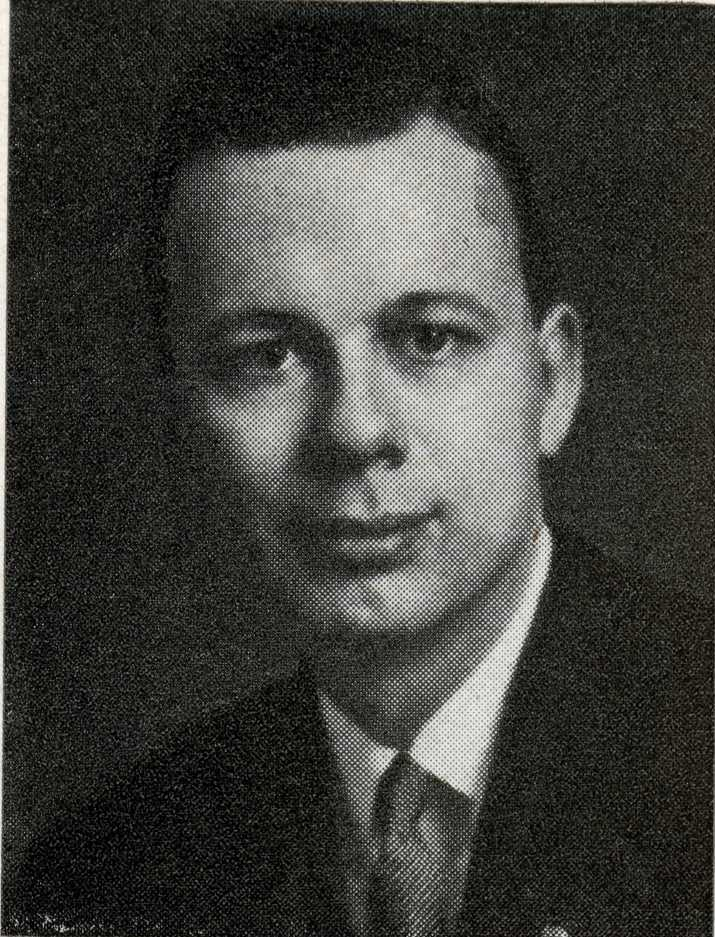
- Official portrait, 1949

37th Mayor of Minneapolis
- In office July 8, 1957 – July 2, 1961
- Preceded by: Eric G. Hoyer
- Succeeded by: Arthur Naftalin

Member of the Minnesota House of Representatives
- In office January 7, 1947 – January 3, 1955

Personal details
- Born: April 13, 1915 Minneapolis, Minnesota, U.S.
- Died: December 31, 1993 (aged 78) Minneapolis, Minnesota, U.S.
- Cause of death: Car crash
- Party: Republican
- Education: University of Minnesota; William Mitchell College of Law
- Profession: lawyer, insurance broker

Paul Kenneth Peterson (April 13, 1915 – December 31, 1993) was an American lawyer, insurance broker and Republican politician who served as mayor of Minneapolis from 1957 to 1961.

== Life and career ==
Peterson was born in Minneapolis, Minnesota in 1915. He attended the University of Minnesota and after graduating worked as an insurance salesman. During World War II, he served in Air Combat Intelligence with the U.S. Navy. After the war, Peterson became involved in politics after working with Governor Luther Youngdahl. Peterson ran for the Minnesota House of Representatives as a Republican and won, serving four terms from January 7, 1947 to January 3, 1955. While serving in the legislature, Peterson earned a law degree from the William Mitchell College of Law. From 1950 to 1953, he also chaired the Minnesota Republican Party.

After leaving the legislature, Peterson ran for the Minneapolis Park and Recreation Board and served as a commissioner from 1955 to 1957. He then ran for mayor of Minneapolis and won, serving two two-year terms from 1957 to 1961. His mayoralty focused on developing the city's core and demolishing neighborhoods such as the Gateway District. In 1960 he unsuccessfully ran for a seat in the United States Senate. In 1961, Peterson lost his bid for reelection to Democratic challenger Arthur Naftalin. In 1963, he ran for mayor again, and again lost to Naftalin. Peterson then entered private law practice, but also served on a number of city and state boards and commissions, and as an administrative law judge for Hennepin County, Minnesota from 1974 to 1985.

Peterson was killed in an automobile accident in Minneapolis on December 31, 1993.

== Personal life ==
Peterson was of Swedish descent. He was married to Jean Ann and they had three daughters: Jane Ann, Paula K., and Carol Jean.

Party political offices
Preceded by Ancher Nelsen	Republican nominee for Lieutenant Governor of Minnesota; 1954	Succeeded by Leonard R. Dickinson
Preceded by Val Bjornson	Republican nominee for U.S. Senator from Minnesota (Class 2); 1960	Succeeded by Robert Forsythe
