= 1960 United States Senate election in Minnesota =

- November 8, 1960

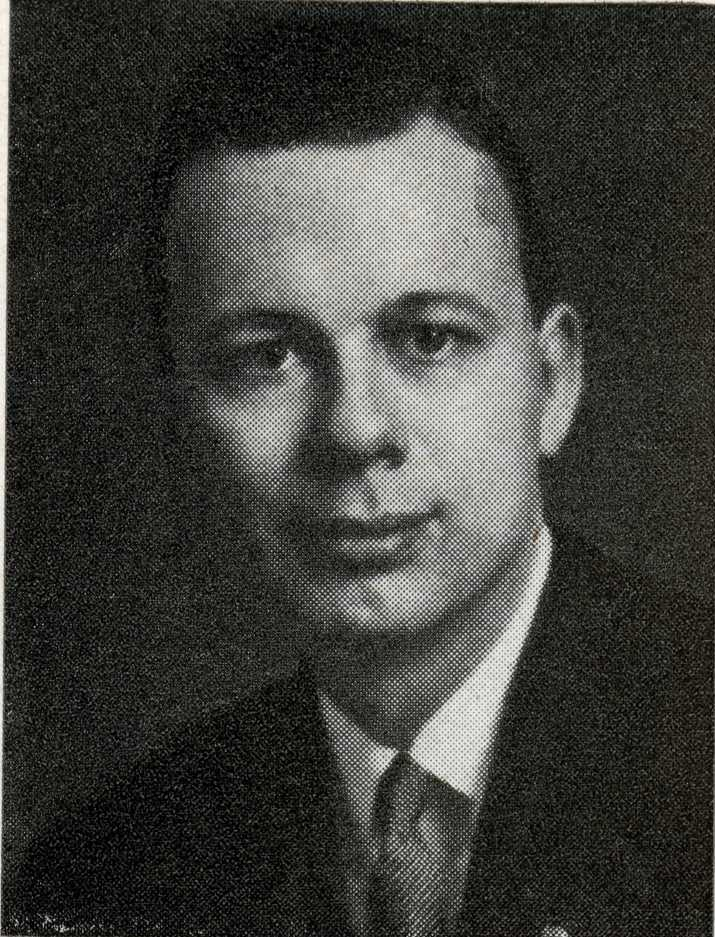
Nominee	Hubert H. Humphrey	P. Kenneth Peterson
Party	Democratic (DFL)	Republican
Popular vote	884,168	648,586
Percentage	57.53%	42.20%
- County results Humphrey: 50–60% 60–70% 70–80% Peterson: 50–60% 60–70%
U.S. senator before election
Hubert H. Humphrey
Democratic (DFL)
Elected U.S. Senator
Hubert H. Humphrey
Democratic (DFL)

The 1960 United States Senate election in Minnesota took place on November 8, 1960. Incumbent Democratic U.S. Senator Hubert H. Humphrey defeated Republican Minneapolis Mayor P. Kenneth Peterson, to win a third term.

== Democratic–Farmer–Labor primary ==
=== Candidates ===
==== Declared ====
- Hubert H. Humphrey, Incumbent U.S. Senator since 1949

=== Results ===
Democratic primary election results
Party	Candidate	Votes	%
Democratic (DFL)	Hubert H. Humphrey (Incumbent)	289,525	100.00%
Total votes		289,525	100.00%

== Republican primary ==
=== Candidates ===
==== Declared ====
- P. Kenneth Peterson, Mayor of Minneapolis since 1957
- James Malcolm Williams

=== Results ===
Republican primary election results
Party	Candidate	Votes	%
Republican	P. Kenneth Peterson	256,641	89.46%
Republican	James Malcolm Williams	30,242	10.54%
Total votes		286,883	100.00%

== General election ==
=== Results ===
General election results
Party	Candidate	Votes	%
Democratic (DFL)	Hubert H. Humphrey (Incumbent)	884,168	57.53%
Republican	P. Kenneth Peterson	648,586	42.20%
Socialist Workers	Carl Feingold	4,085	0.27%
Total votes		1,536,839	100.00%
Majority		235,582	15.33%
Democratic (DFL) hold			

== See also ==
- United States Senate elections, 1960 and 1961
