= Mary Brennan (Connecticut politician) =

American politician (1910–1977)

Member of the Connecticut House of Representatives from Somers
- In office 1951–1953 Serving with Robert L. Keeney Jr.
- Preceded by: Arthur Olmsted; Gertrude Wood
- Succeeded by: Robert L. Keeney Jr. Margaret Strekas

Personal details
- Born: Mary Martha Carpenter; January 31, 1910 Lynn, Massachusetts, U.S.
- Died: December 17, 1977 (aged 67) Hartford, Connecticut, U.S.
- Party: Democratic
- Spouse: John J. Brennan (m. 1935)
- Children: 3

Mary Martha Carpenter Brennan (January 31, 1910 – December 17, 1977) was an American politician who served in the Connecticut House of Representatives from 1951 to 1953, representing the town of Somers as a Democrat.

== Personal life ==
Mary Martha Carpenter was born on January 31, 1910, in Lynn, Massachusetts, to Patrick and Catherine Carpenter. She married John J. Brennan on November 1, 1935, in Galion, Ohio. The two were childhood friends and had reunited on a train earlier that day. After disembarking, they went to get a marriage license and were married that night by a local justice of the peace. They had two sons and a daughter and were married until John's death.

== Political career ==
A Democrat, Brennan was elected to the Connecticut House of Representatives in 1950. She served one term representing the town of Somers alongside Republican Robert L. Keeney Jr. Brennan unsuccessfully ran for the 35th district of the Connecticut State Senate in 1952 and 1954.

== Death ==
Brennan died on December 17, 1977, in Hartford, Connecticut. She was 67.
