= 1954 Texas lieutenant gubernatorial election =

- November 2, 1954
| Nominee | Ben Ramsey |
| Party | Democratic |
| Popular vote | 567,161 |
| Percentage | 99.99% |
Lieutenant Governor before election
Ben Ramsey
Democratic
Elected Lieutenant Governor
Ben Ramsey
Democratic

The 1954 Texas lieutenant gubernatorial election was held on November 2, 1954, in order to elect the lieutenant governor of Texas. Incumbent Democratic lieutenant governor Ben Ramsey won re-election as he faced no opposition.

== General election ==
On election day, November 2, 1954, incumbent Democratic lieutenant governor Ben Ramsey won re-election as he faced no opposition, thereby retaining Democratic control over the office of lieutenant governor. Ramsey was sworn in for his third term on January 18, 1955.

=== Results ===
Texas lieutenant gubernatorial election, 1954
| Party | Candidate | Votes | % |
|---|---|---|---|
| Democratic | Ben Ramsey (incumbent) | 567,161 | 99.99 |
| | Scattering | 54 | 0.01 |
| Total votes | | 567,215 | 100.00 |
| Democratic hold | | | |
