= Eric G. Hoyer =

American interior designer and politician

- Hoyer in ~1950

36th Mayor of Minneapolis
- In office 1948–1957
- Preceded by: Hubert Humphrey
- Succeeded by: P. Kenneth Peterson

Personal details
- Born: March 3, 1898 Sweden
- Died: March 17, 1990 (aged 92) Manhattan Beach, California, U.S.

Eric G. Hoyer (March 3, 1898 – March 17, 1990) was an American interior designer and politician who served as mayor of Minneapolis from 1948 to 1957.

== Life and career ==
Hoyer was born in Sweden and emigrated to Minnesota in 1919 to settle the estate of his brother who had died during the 1918 flu pandemic. He then remained in Minneapolis, working in construction and later interior design. He took classes at the Dunwoody Institute but later remarked that he learned most of his skills on his own.

His interest in politics began when he worked on the campaign of Floyd B. Olson. Thereafter he became involved with local labor unions and, in 1936, was elected to the Minneapolis City Council. When Hubert Humphrey resigned as mayor in 1948 after winning election to the United States Senate, Hoyer (as president of the city council) became the city's acting mayor. He was later elected to four additional terms, serving until 1957 during a largely uneventful period in the city's history. He lost his 1957 reelection bid to P. Kenneth Peterson.

Hoyer died in 1990 in Manhattan Beach, California.

Political offices
Preceded by Hubert Humphrey	Mayor of Minneapolis; 1948 – 1957	Succeeded by P. Kenneth Peterson
