= 1954 Ecuadorian parliamentary election =

Election in Ecuador

Parliamentary elections were held in Ecuador on 6 June 1954.

== Results ==
Party	Votes	%
Concentration of People's Forces	113,947	26.06
Conservative Party	101,537	23.22
Ecuadorian Radical Liberal Party	64,601	14.77
Democratic People's Front	51,541	11.79
Socialist Party	29,829	6.82
People's Union	5,149	1.18
Others	70,675	16.16
Total	437,279	100.00
Valid votes	437,279	94.00
Invalid/blank votes	27,908	6.00
Total votes	465,187	100.00
Registered voters/turnout	569,959	81.62
Source: Nohlen
