= South Sioux Falls, South Dakota =

Coordinates: 43°30′44″N 96°43′46″W

South Sioux Falls was an incorporated community located in south-central Minnehaha County, South Dakota, United States. It existed from 1890 until 1955. The community was centered in present-day Sioux Falls along Minnesota Avenue (now South Dakota Highway 115), stretching from 33rd Street in the north to 57th Street in the south.

== History ==
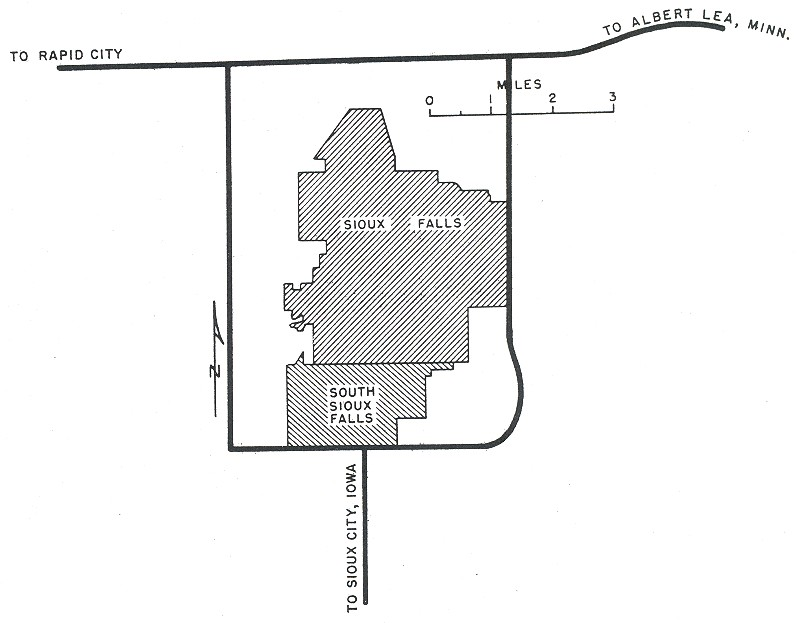
1955 map of proposed Interstate routes, showing South Sioux Falls as an independent city

South Sioux Falls was founded in early 1888 on 4 acres (16,000 m^{2}) of land donated by lawyer and congressman Richard F. Pettigrew and S. L. Tate for the Norwegian Lutheran Normal School (now Augustana College). The city was incorporated on February 20, 1890, by a 63–0 vote. Pettigrew had envisioned an industrial suburb and funded construction of a railroad to Pierre and a six-story packing plant, which were both never fully realized.

The city once covered 1,800 acres (7.3 km^{2}) and had a woolen mill, soap factory, an axle grease factory, and the first airport in the region—Soo Skyways. A streetcar line connecting South Sioux Falls to Sioux Falls opened in 1889, but was permanently closed in 1896. It later became a bedroom community for Sioux Falls workers and was designated as a second-class city in May 1948. The city had approximately 1,600 people at the time of the 1950 census, making it the third largest settlement in South Dakota.

A merger with Sioux Falls was proposed in the 1940s and was followed by lobbying from the South Sioux Falls city commission for a repeal of the statewide ban on municipal consolidation. The state legislature repealed the ban in 1951, allowing for studies into consolidation to commence. A ballot proposition to merge the cities was defeated by South Sioux Falls voters on April 15, 1952, despite a parallel proposition passing in Sioux Falls. A second attempt was made in 1955, with terms agreed by the two city governments to take over the debts of South Sioux Falls and combine school districts. On October 18, 1955, South Sioux Falls voted 704–227 in favor of consolidating. The same ballot proposition was approved by Sioux Falls voters on November 15, by a 2,714–450 margin.

The consolidation took effect on December 31, 1955. The mayors of Sioux Falls and South Sioux Falls were planned to preside over a ceremony to dismantle a "Welcome to South Sioux Falls" sign on Minnesota Avenue; the event was cancelled after the sign was set on fire.
