= 1954 Minnesota lieutenant gubernatorial election =

- November 2, 1954
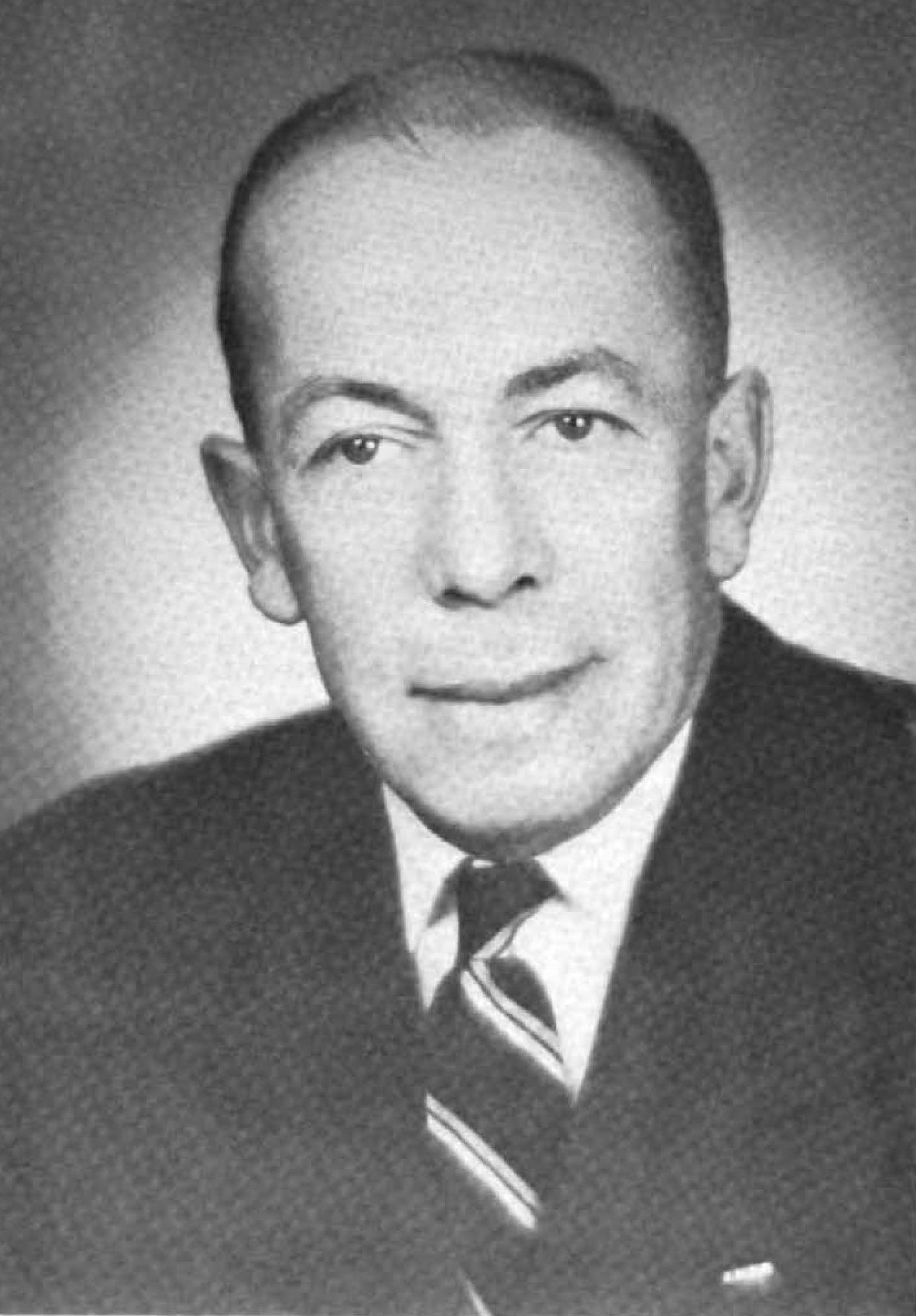

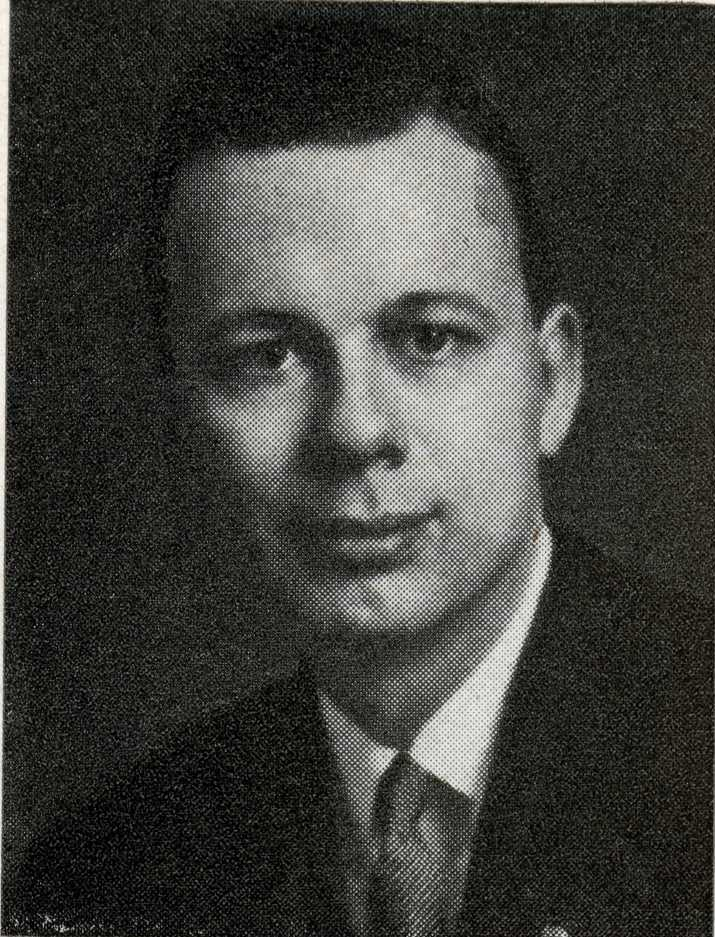
Nominee	Karl Rolvaag	P. Kenneth Peterson
Party	Democratic (DFL)	Republican
Popular vote	586,445	532,444
Percentage	52.41%	47.59%
- County results Rolvaag: 50–60% 60–70% 70–80% Peterson: 50–60% 60–70% 70–80%
Lieutenant Governor before election
Donald O. Wright
Republican
Elected Lieutenant Governor
Karl Rolvaag
Democratic (DFL)

The 1954 Minnesota lieutenant gubernatorial election took place on November 2, 1954. Minnesota Democratic-Farmer-Labor Party candidate Karl Rolvaag defeated Republican Party of Minnesota challenger P. Kenneth Peterson.

== Results ==
1954 lieutenant gubernatorial election, Minnesota
Party	Candidate	Votes	%	±%
Democratic (DFL)	Karl Rolvaag	586,445	52.41%	+6.71%
Republican	P. Kenneth Peterson	532,444	47.59%	−6.71%
Majority		54,001	4.82%	
Turnout		1,118,889		
Democratic (DFL) gain from Republican		Swing		
