= 1954 Saudi Arabian municipal elections =

Municipal elections were held in Saudi Arabia in 1954. The elections were held shortly after King Saud ascended to the throne in 1953. While there had previously been municipal councils in a few areas, elected councils were now introduced across the country. However, in some areas voting was limited to trusted individuals.

== Results ==
In Qatif the Knowledge Society for the Struggle received a majority of the vote. However, the government intervened and appointed three village leaders, three civil servants and three candidates from left-wing lists.

In Hofuf Shia candidates won two of the eleven seats, with Sunni candidates from prominent families winning eight.
