= Edward N. Allen =

American politician (1891–1972)

Edward Normand Allen
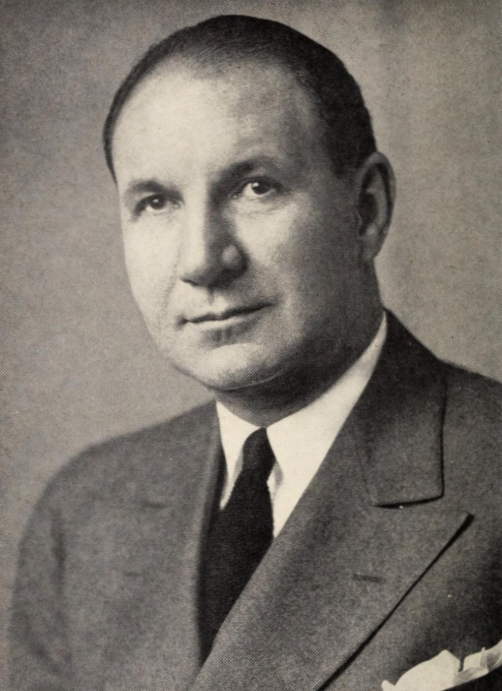

92nd Lieutenant Governor of Connecticut
- In office January 3, 1951 – January 5, 1955
- Governor: John Davis Lodge
- Preceded by: William T. Carroll
- Succeeded by: Charles W. Jewett

51st Mayor of Hartford, Connecticut
- In office January 3, 1947 – January 6, 1948
- Preceded by: Cornelius A. Moylan
- Succeeded by: Cyril Coleman

Member of the Connecticut State Senate from the 1st district
- In office 1927–1929
- Preceded by: Samuel Colt Doty
- Succeeded by: Michael A. Connor

Personal details
- Born: April 18, 1891 Hartford, Connecticut, U.S.
- Died: November 14, 1972 (aged 81)
- Resting place: Enfield Street Cemetery, Enfield, Connecticut, U.S.
- Party: Republican
- Relatives: Julia Keeney (sister)

Edward Normand Allen (April 18, 1891 – November 14, 1972) was an American businessman and politician who was the 92nd lieutenant governor of Connecticut from 1951 to 1955.

== Early life ==
Allen was born in Hartford, Connecticut, on April 18, 1891. Politician Julia Keeney was his sister. Allen attended Norwich University and graduated from Yale University. He served in the U.S. Army in the First World War. In 1916, he rode with General Pershing in the expedition into Mexico pursuing rebel Pancho Villa. He married Ruby Tuttle (1894–1992) on December 13, 1916. They had three children: Jane Allen Merrick (1917–2000), Caroline Allen Talbot (1920–2015), and Frances Allen (1924–2000). From 1920 to 1924, he was Hartford Police Commissioner; in the mid-1940s he was president of the Sage-Allen department store. He married Mildred Pomeranz on November 7, 1935. They had two children, Normand Francis Allen II (1935–present) and Mary.

== Political career ==
Allen was a Republican and a member of the Connecticut State Senate for the 1st District from 1927 to 1929. He was an alternate delegate to the Republican National Convention from Connecticut in 1928. From 1947 to 1948, he was mayor of Hartford. He was elected Lieutenant Governor of Connecticut as a running mate of John D. Lodge in 1950 to the first four-year term of governor and lieutenant governor of the State. They served for one term, from January 3, 1951, to January 5, 1955.

Allen's second wife, Mildred Pomeranz Allen, who was also a Republican, was Secretary of State of Connecticut from 1955 to 1959.

Allen was a recipient of the Yale Club of Hartford's Nathan Hale Award in recognition of outstanding service to Yale and Connecticut.

Allen died on November 14, 1972, and was interred at Enfield Street Cemetery, Enfield, Connecticut.

== See also ==
- List of governors of Connecticut

Political offices
Preceded by William T. Carroll	Lieutenant Governor of Connecticut; 1951-1955	Succeeded by Charles W. Jewett
