= 1954 California lieutenant gubernatorial election =

- November 2, 1954
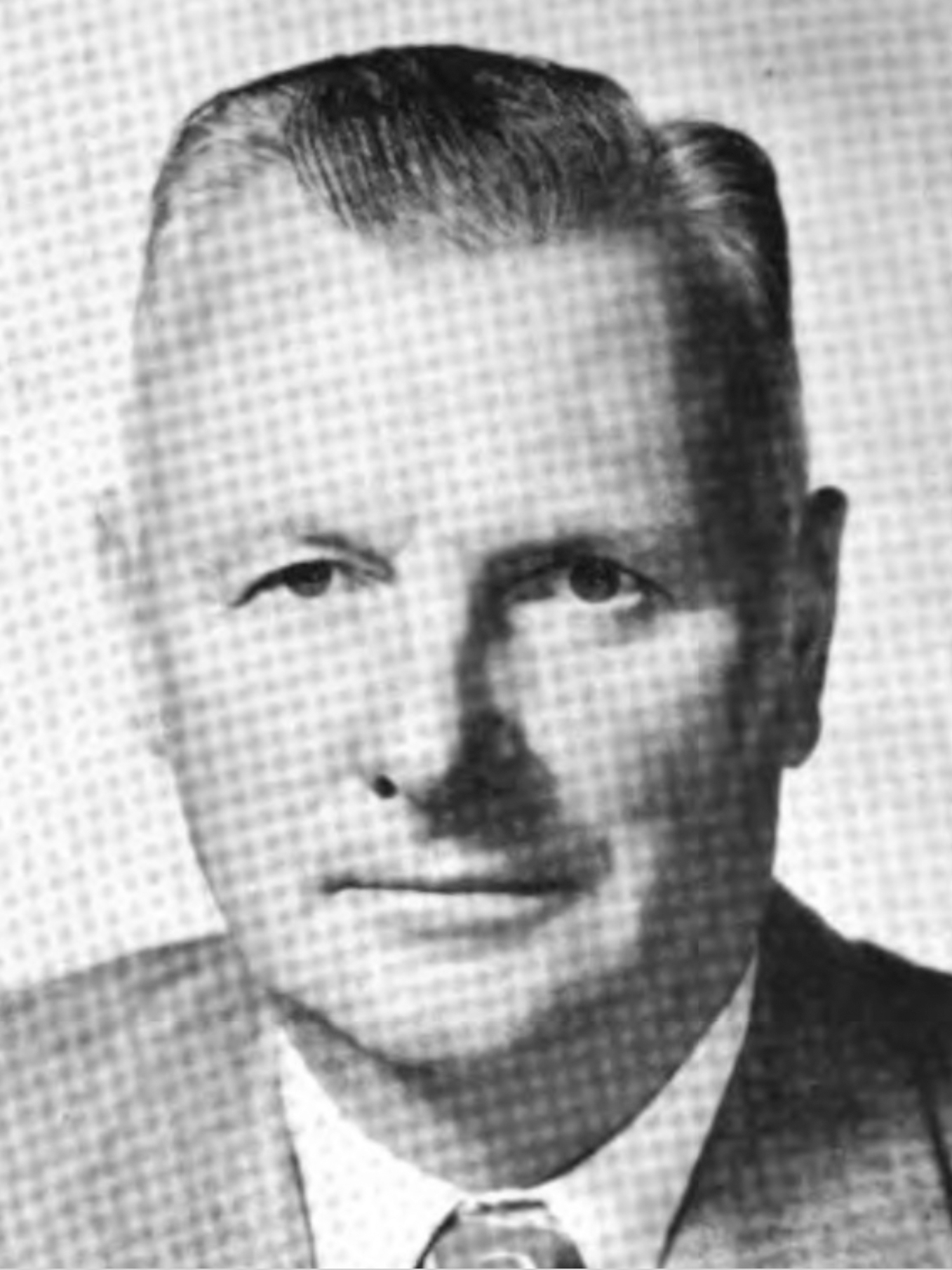

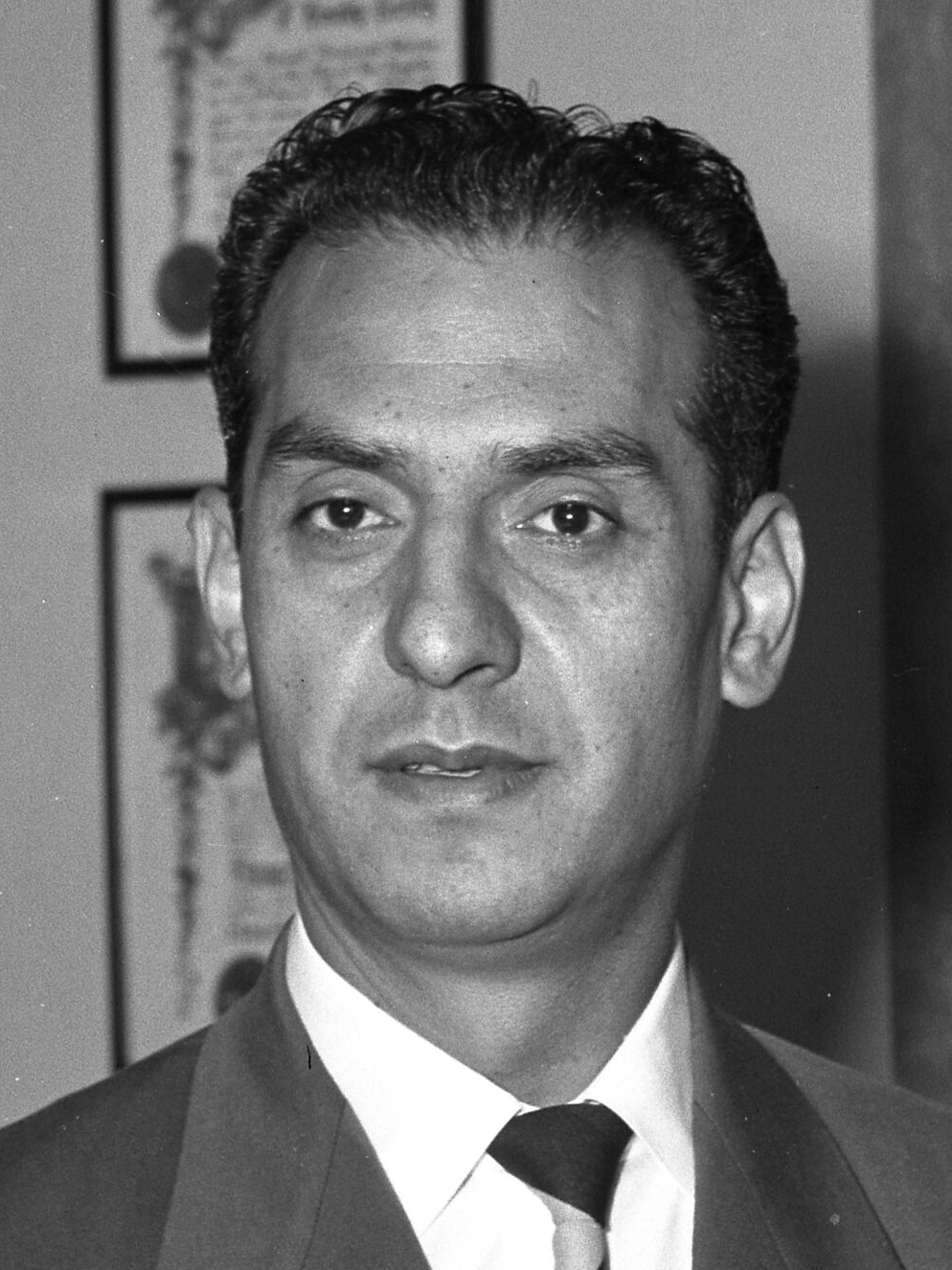
Nominee	Harold J. Powers	Edward R. Roybal
Party	Republican	Democratic
Popular vote	2,185,918	1,764,035
Percentage	55.34%	44.66%
- County results Powers: 50–60% 60–70% 70–80% Roybal: 50–60%
Lieutenant Governor before election
Harold J. Powers
Republican
Elected Lieutenant Governor
Harold J. Powers
Republican

The 1954 California lieutenant gubernatorial election was held on November 2, 1954. Incumbent Republican Harold J. Powers defeated Democratic nominee Edward R. Roybal with 55.34% of the vote in a landslide.

== General election ==
=== Candidates ===
- Harold J. Powers, Republican
- Edward R. Roybal, Democratic

=== Results ===
1954 California lieutenant gubernatorial election
Party	Candidate	Votes	%	±%
Republican	Harold J. Powers (incumbent)	2,185,918	55.34%	−44.65%
Democratic	Edward R. Roybal	1,764,035	44.66%	+44.64%
Majority		421,883		
Turnout				
Republican hold		Swing		
