= 1954 Monegasque general election =

General elections were held in Monaco on 10 January 1954 with a second round on 17 January 1954 to elect the 18 members of the National Council.

== Electoral system ==
Voters can either choose a party list or choose candidates from various lists ("panachage") for the 18 seats. To be elected a candidate must receive a majority of valid votes. If the 18 seats are not filled in the first round, the remaining seats are elected in a second round by a simple majority.

== Results ==
=== First round ===
Candidate	Votes	%
Emile Gaziello	613	68.72
Jean-Charles Rey	542	60.76
Charles Campora	507	56.84
Charles Palmaro	504	56.50
Louis Orecchia	499	55.94
Robert Boisson	481	53.92
Jean Notari	480	53.81
Auguste Médecin	474	53.14
Charles Bernasconi	473	53.03
Jean-Jo Marquet	451	50.56
Joseph Simon	451	50.56
Total	5,475	100.00
Valid votes	892	98.13
Invalid/blank votes	17	1.87
Total votes	909	100.00
Registered voters/turnout	1,118	81.31
Source: Journal de Monaco

=== Second round ===
Candidate	Votes	%
Jean Gastaud-Mercury	446	52.10
Paul Choinière	438	51.17
Michel Aureglia	419	48.95
Joseph Fissore	407	47.55
Etienne Boéri	404	47.20
François Marquet	384	44.86
Louis Thibaud	371	43.34
Total	2,869	100.00
Total votes	856	–
Registered voters/turnout	1,118	76.57
Source: Journal de Monaco
