= Charles W. Jewett (Connecticut politician) =

American politician (1913–2000)

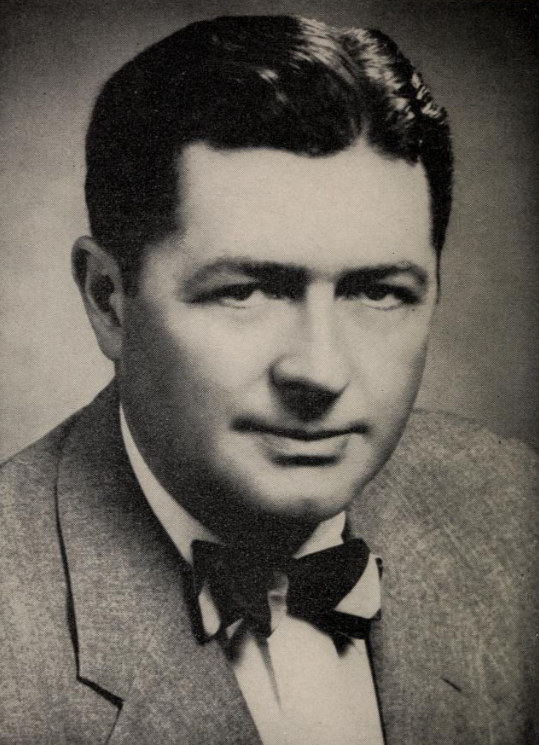

93rd Lieutenant Governor of Connecticut
- In office 1955–1959
- Governor: Abraham Ribicoff
- Preceded by: Edward N. Allen
- Succeeded by: John N. Dempsey

Member of the Connecticut Senate from the 20th district
- In office 1953–1955
- Preceded by: Leslie P. Clarke
- Succeeded by: Lawrence M. Gilman

Member of the Connecticut House of Representatives from Lyme
- In office 1947–1949 Serving with Ray L. Harding
- Preceded by: Carolyn Cone; John E. Russell
- Succeeded by: John Mazer; Allen Bartman
- In office 1941–1943 Serving with Allen Bartman
- Preceded by: J. Warren Stark; Allen Bartman
- Succeeded by: Carolyn Cone; Robert H. Winslow

Personal details
- Born: March 14, 1913 Detroit, Michigan, U.S.
- Died: November 3, 2000 (aged 87) Lyme, Connecticut, U.S.
- Party: Republican
- Education: University of Michigan; Yale Law School

Charles Wood Jewett (March 14, 1913 – November 3, 2000) was an American politician who was the 93rd Lieutenant Governor of Connecticut from 1955 to 1959. From 1941 to 1943 and 1947 to 1949, he represented Lyme in the Connecticut House of Representatives. From 1953 to 1955, he was a member of the Connecticut State Senate, representing the 20th district.

Political offices
Preceded by Edward N. Allen	Lieutenant Governor of Connecticut; 1955-1959	Succeeded by John N. Dempsey
