= 1954 East German referendum =

29 June 1954
- Are you for a peace treaty and the withdrawal of occupying troops, or for the European Defence Community, the General Treaty and keeping the occupying troops for 50 years?

Results
Choice	Votes	%
Peace treaty	12,131,730	93.46%
European Defence Community etc.	849,063	6.54%
Valid votes	12,980,793	96.89%
Invalid or blank votes	416,844	3.11%
Total votes	13,397,637	100.00%
Registered voters/turnout	13,588,397	98.6%

A referendum on a peace treaty was held in East Germany on 29 June 1954. Voters were asked "Are you for a peace treaty and the withdrawal of occupying troops, or for the European Defence Community, the General Treaty and keeping the occupying troops for 50 years?" The first option was approved by 93.46% of voters.

== Results ==
Choice	Votes	%
Peace treaty	12,131,730	93.46
European Defence Community etc.	849,063	6.54
Invalid/blank votes	416,844	–
Total	13,397,640	100
Registered voters/turnout	13,588,397	98.60
Source: Direct Democracy
