= Masha and Dasha Krivoshlyapova =

Russian conjoined twins

- Born: Мария и Дарья Кривошляповы; 3 January 1950; Moscow, Soviet Union
- Died: 17 April 2003 (aged 53); Moscow, Russia
- Known for: Conjoined twins

Maria "Masha" Ivanovna Krivoshlyapova and Daria "Dasha" Ivanovna Krivoshlyapova (Russian: Мария "Маша" Ивановна Кривошляпова и Дарья "Даша" Ивановна Кривошляпова, IPA: [mɐˈrʲijə ɪ ˈdarʲjə krʲɪvəˈʂlʲapəvə]; 3 January 1950 – 17 April 2003) were Ischiopagus tripus conjoined twins from Russia.

They were removed from their mother's custody at birth to be studied by Soviet physiologists. Their mother was told that her daughters had died soon after their birth.

The Soviet physiologist Pyotr Anokhin was studying the separate roles of the nervous system and the blood system on the body's ability to adjust to conditions such as prolonged sleep deprivation, extreme hunger, and extreme temperature change. Conjoined twins who shared a blood system but had separate nervous systems were ideal objects for research. He had put out an alert to all maternity hospitals in the USSR to be informed if any conjoined twins were born. He began studying Masha and Dasha within days of their birth.

== Pregnancy and birth ==
Masha and Dasha's mother, Yekaterina Krivoshlyapova, did not know she was having twins and spent two days and nights giving birth naturally. The doctors told her she had delivered a severely disabled child, and she was not shown the babies. They were born joined at the waist at a 180-degree angle with two heads, two torsos, four arms, one leg each, and a third, vestigial limb at their back that had some movement.

== Early life ==
When the twins were born, their mother was told they required full-time care from the State. She agreed, but on the condition that she would keep custody and visit them regularly. A night nurse brought the twins to their mother and let her hold them. Scientists did not want her to keep custody of them, so she was later told by one of Pyotr Anokhin's physiologists that they had died of pneumonia. In reality, the twins had been taken to the Institute of Experimental Medicine in Moscow to be studied and experimented on under laboratory conditions. The Soviet Academy of Medical Sciences produced a documentary film detailing the research.

In autumn 1950, Anokhin was sentenced to two years in a Gulag for his views on genetics (which taught Lysenkoism and Lamarckian evolution rather than Mendelian genetics and Darwinian evolution). The twins were placed in the Academy of Medical Sciences' Pediatric Institute, where Anokhin continued to carry out experiments on them for the following six years.

Masha and Dasha's case is now considered a prolonged case of medical torture. Experiments included packing one twin in ice to bring their temperature down to near-fatal levels while observing temperature changes in the other twin, burning them, starving them, depriving them of sleep, and electrocuting them in time with a metronome to test their reflexes. Their lung, heart and brain activity was constantly monitored by pneumograms, electrocardiograms and encephalograms. Tubes were routinely inserted into their stomachs to monitor gastric juices and blood was taken from them three times a day.

In 1956, they were transferred to the Central Scientific Research Institute of Traumatology and Orthopedics (TSNIIPP) (Центральный научно-исследовательский институт протезирования и протезостроения) in Moscow where they were taught to walk and given an elementary education. They were kept hidden from the public in a children's ward there for the following eight years.

== Education ==
In 1964, news spread to Moscow that a girl with two heads was being kept in the institute. As a result, the twins were transferred to a boarding school for children with motor-impairment in Novocherkassk, southern Russia, to continue their education.

They studied there for four years in what they later recalled was the happiest time of their lives. In 1968, their third leg was amputated in an effort to make them less noticeable to the Soviet public, who were not used to seeing disabled people.

By then, the twins had developed very different personalities, with Masha being dominant, tomboyish and cheeky, and Dasha submissive, thoughtful and quiet. Dasha fell in love with a fellow student, but Masha put a stop to the romance. Dasha fell into a depression and tried to hang herself when the pair were 18. That coincided with having been told by a medical commission that graded disability that they had been placed in the lowest grade, which meant that they would be kept for life in a retirement home (there were no homes for disabled people as the Soviet Union saw 'invalids' as flaws in the system) with no right to work or be independent in any way.

In 1989, aged 39, they moved into the 20th Home for Veterans of War and Labour and lived there in a small room with a single bed for the next fourteen years. They earned pocket money sewing diapers and assembling pipettes.

In 1985, they had found their birth mother, Yekaterina Krivoshlyapova, and she visited them for four years before Masha broke off the connection. They were also visited every week by "Aunty Nadya" — Nadezhda Gorokhova — their physiotherapist in TSNIIPP, who befriended them and remained a part of their lives.

With the coming of Gorbachev's policy of glasnost (openness) they made an appeal on a national television chat show Vzglyad in 1988 to be allowed to leave the 20th Home, which was being turned into a mental asylum. The appeal was successful and they moved to the 6th Home for Veterans of Labour, where they enjoyed greatly improved living conditions. With the proceeds of charitable donations, they bought themselves luxuries such as a television set, a music cassette player, and an Atari computer.

== Later life ==
They were also able to buy alcohol, and over the next decade, the twins became alcoholics. Only Dasha actually drank, as Masha was unable to because of a gag reflex, but because they shared the same blood supply, both would become inebriated. They made many attempts to stop drinking, which included hypnotism, magic spells, and being "sewn up," a process whereby a capsule (containing a nocebo chemical that would supposedly kill them upon inebriation) was inserted surgically under their skin.

The pair visited Cologne, Germany in August 1991. However, the trip was cut short following the Soviet coup attempt to overthrow Mikhail Gorbachev.

They befriended a British journalist, Juliet Butler, in 1988. The twins and Butler's family became close friends over the next twelve years and she collaborated with them in appearing in a BBC Horizon documentary on conjoined twins in 1999. Butler also helped write their autobiography, which was published in Germany in 2000. She wrote a novel based on their life story, The Less you Know, The Sounder You Sleep, which was published in the UK, Australia, New Zealand, Canada, India, South Africa, and the Netherlands in 2017.

British surgeon Lewis Spitz, who specialised in operating on conjoined twins, offered to separate them in London, but Masha was against the procedure.

=== Death ===
Masha fell ill on 13 April 2003, complaining of back pain. She died of a heart attack the following day, seventeen hours after the onset of her symptoms. Dasha was taken to the First City Hospital and died seventeen hours later due to blood poisoning from the toxic byproducts of Masha's decomposing body. At the time of their death, they were the oldest living conjoined twins.

The pair were cremated, and their remains lie in the Novodevichy Cemetery in Moscow.
