= Multi-headed =

Multi-headed can refer to:

- Polycephaly, the condition of having more than one head
  - Lernaean Hydra, an ancient serpent-like chthonic water beast that possessed numerous heads
- Multi-headed train, where two or more engines are used
- Multi-monitor, multiple physical display devices running on a single computer system
