= Ilona and Judit Gófitz =

Hungarian conjoined twins (1701–1723)

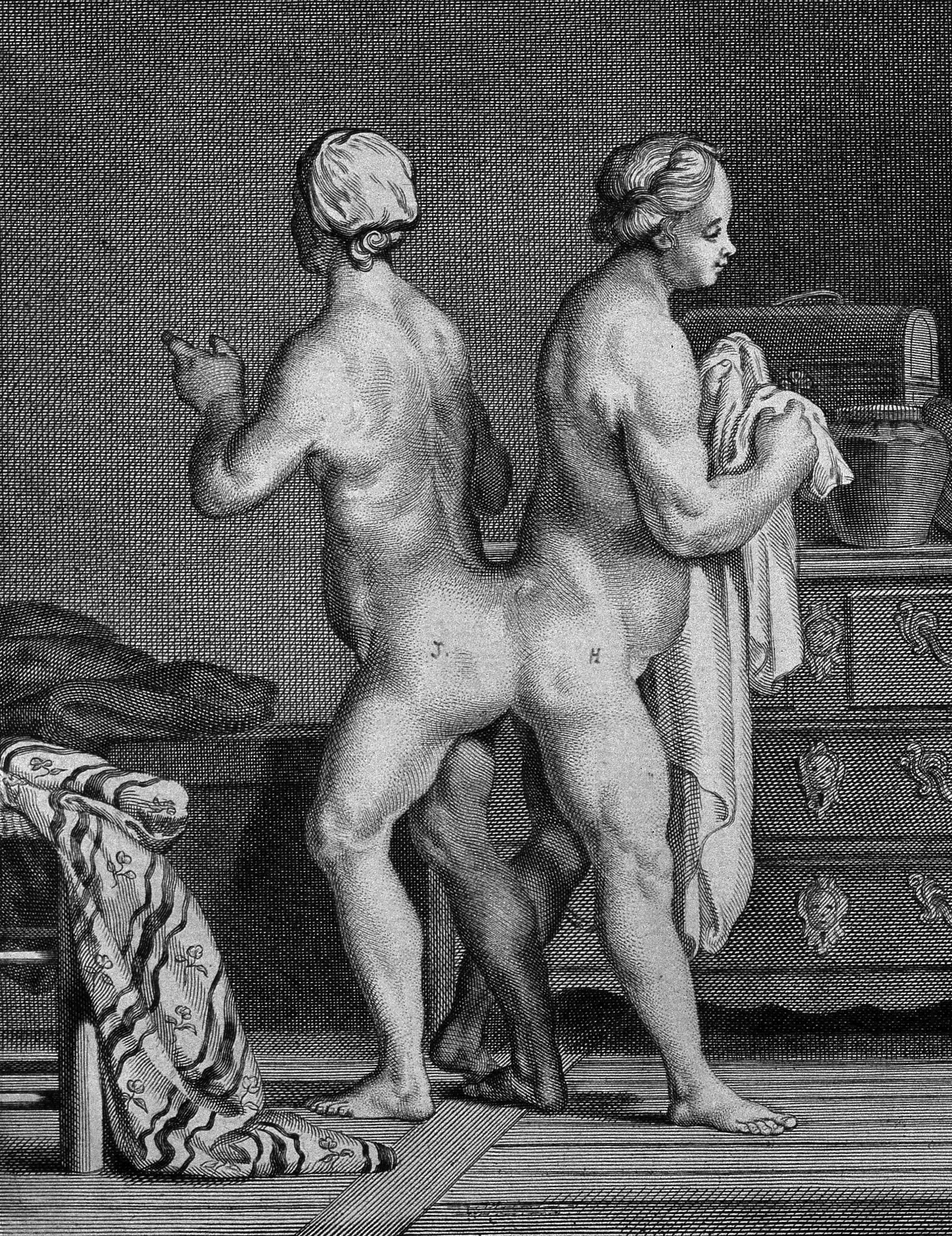
Judith and Helen of Szony

Ilona and Judit Gófitz (Hungarian: Gófitz Ilona és Judit; in contemporary publications: Helen and Judith of Szőny), also known as the Hungarian Sisters, were conjoined twins from Szőny, Hungary who lived from 19 October 1701 to 8 February 1723. The sisters, who were pygopagus (joined at the pelvis), were examined by doctors and exhibited to curious crowds throughout Europe. At the age of nine, the pair retired to a convent in Presburg, Kingdom of Hungary, where they spent the rest of their lives. They died within hours of each other.
