= Dicephalic parapagus twins =

Rare form of partial twinning

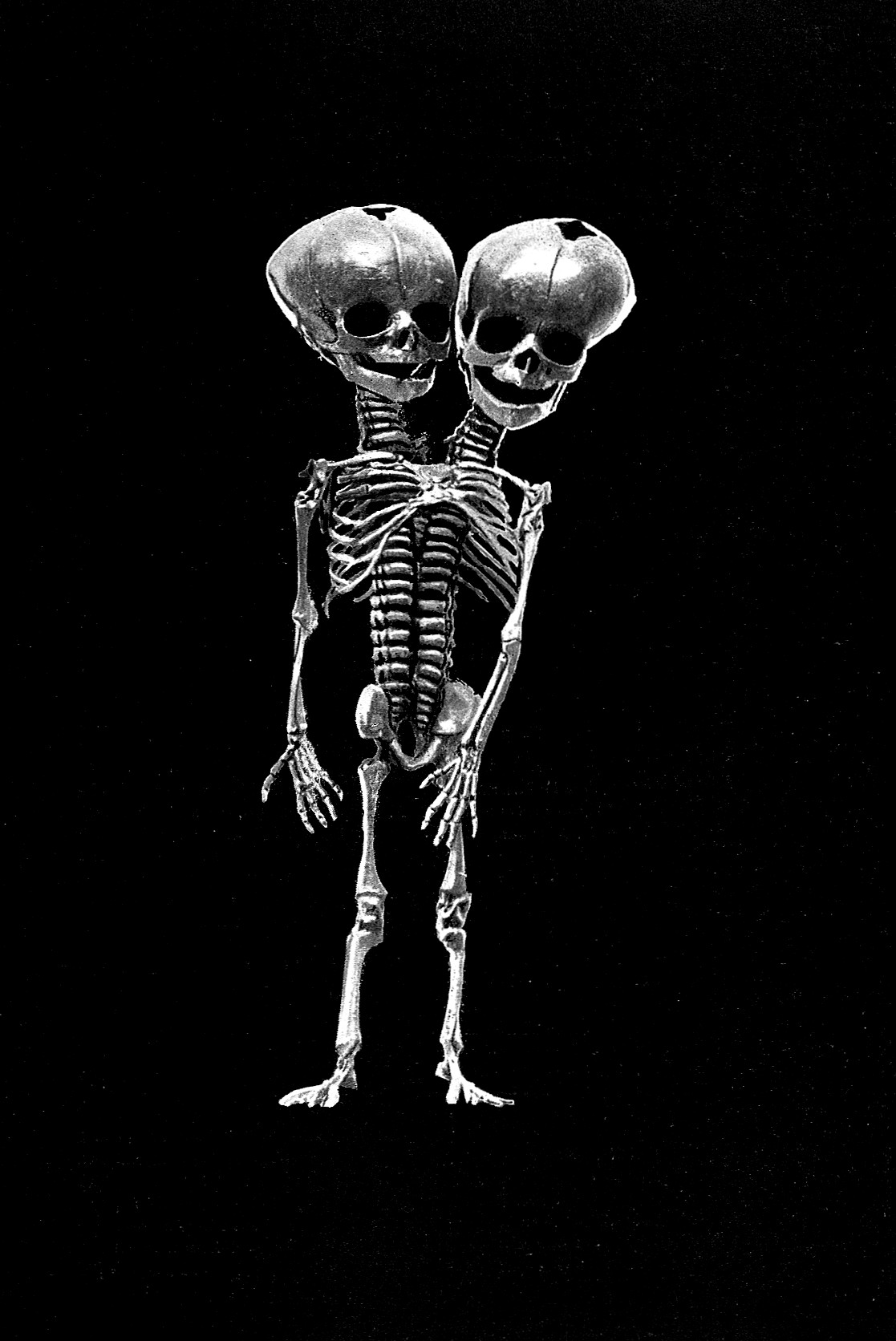
Skeletal structure of dicephalic twins. B. C. Hirst & G. A. Piersol, Human monstrosities. Wellcome L0027955. (1893)

Dicephalic parapagus (/daɪˈsɛfəlɪk/) is a rare form of partial twinning with two heads side by side on one torso. Infants conjoined this way are sometimes called "two-headed babies" in popular media. The condition is also called parapagus dicephalus.

If carried to term, most dicephalic twins are stillborn, or die soon after birth. A small number are known to have survived to adulthood.

The extent to which limbs and organs are duplicated varies from case to case. One head may be only partially developed (anencephalic), or both may be complete. In some cases, two complete hearts are present as well, which improves their chances of survival. The total number of arms may be two, three or four.

Their prospects are best if no attempt is made to separate them, except in cases in which one twin is clearly dying.

== Terminology ==
Dicephalus means two-headed. Parapagus means joined side by side.

Dicephalic twins are called:

- dibrachius, if they have two arms altogether (one for each twin),
- tribrachius, if they have three arms altogether,
- tetrabrachius, if they have four arms altogether,
- dipus, if they have two legs altogether (one for each twin).

== Incidence ==
Conjoined twins appear in one in 50,000 to one in 100,000 births. Dicephalic twins represent about 11 percent of all conjoined twins.

== Medical and social response ==
As late as the 1960s, some medical publications argued that newborn dicephalic twins should not be actively treated or resuscitated. An attempt at surgical separation was reported in a paper published in 1982, but did not result in long-term survival of either twin. In more recent cases in Turkey and Minnesota, doctors advised that separation surgery would not be appropriate.

== Dicephalic twins who survived past infancy ==
Giacomo and Giovanni Battista Tocci (1877–1894), were Italian male dicephalus parapagus twins who survived to adolescence. Each had his own pair of arms, so they were tetrabrachius. They had two legs altogether (dipus), one of which was controlled by each twin. They were exhibited in freak shows as children and teenagers. The Toccis learned to speak several languages, but never learned to walk.

Abby and Brittany Hensel, born in Minnesota in 1990, are American female dicephalus parapagus twins. They were born with two functional arms, plus a vestigial third arm, which was surgically removed, hence they were born tribrachius but are now dibrachius dipus. Each twin has her own complete head, heart and spine, and controls one arm and one leg. They learned to walk around the same age as average children, went on to attend school, learn to drive, play sports, and graduated from college. They earned their teaching licenses and now teach in the fifth grade.

Ayşe and Sema Tanrıkulu, born in 2000, are Turkish female dicephalus parapagus twins. They are tetrabrachius dipus like the Tocci brothers, with four arms and two legs all together. As with the Toccis and the Hensels, it was found that each twin controls one leg. Because of the size of their upper body, the Turkish twins needed a special program of exercises before they could learn to walk. After that, they learned to run and climb stairs without further specialist help, and at age 11 they were going to school with other children. As of 2019, they are pursuing higher education.

== See also ==
- Craniopagus parasiticus is another form of partial twinning which results in two heads kept alive by a single torso. In these cases a second, vestigial torso is present, and the heads are joined directly to one another.
- Diprosopus is a condition in which there are duplicated facial features on one head.
- Polycephaly is a general term about organisms with more than one head.
- Zaphod Beeblebrox, a fictional character generally depicted as having the phenotypical appearance of dicephalic parapagus twins while however being considered one person. (Just how two heads are compatible with single personhood is never explained, but then the character is an alien.)
