= Polycephaly =

Condition of having more than one head

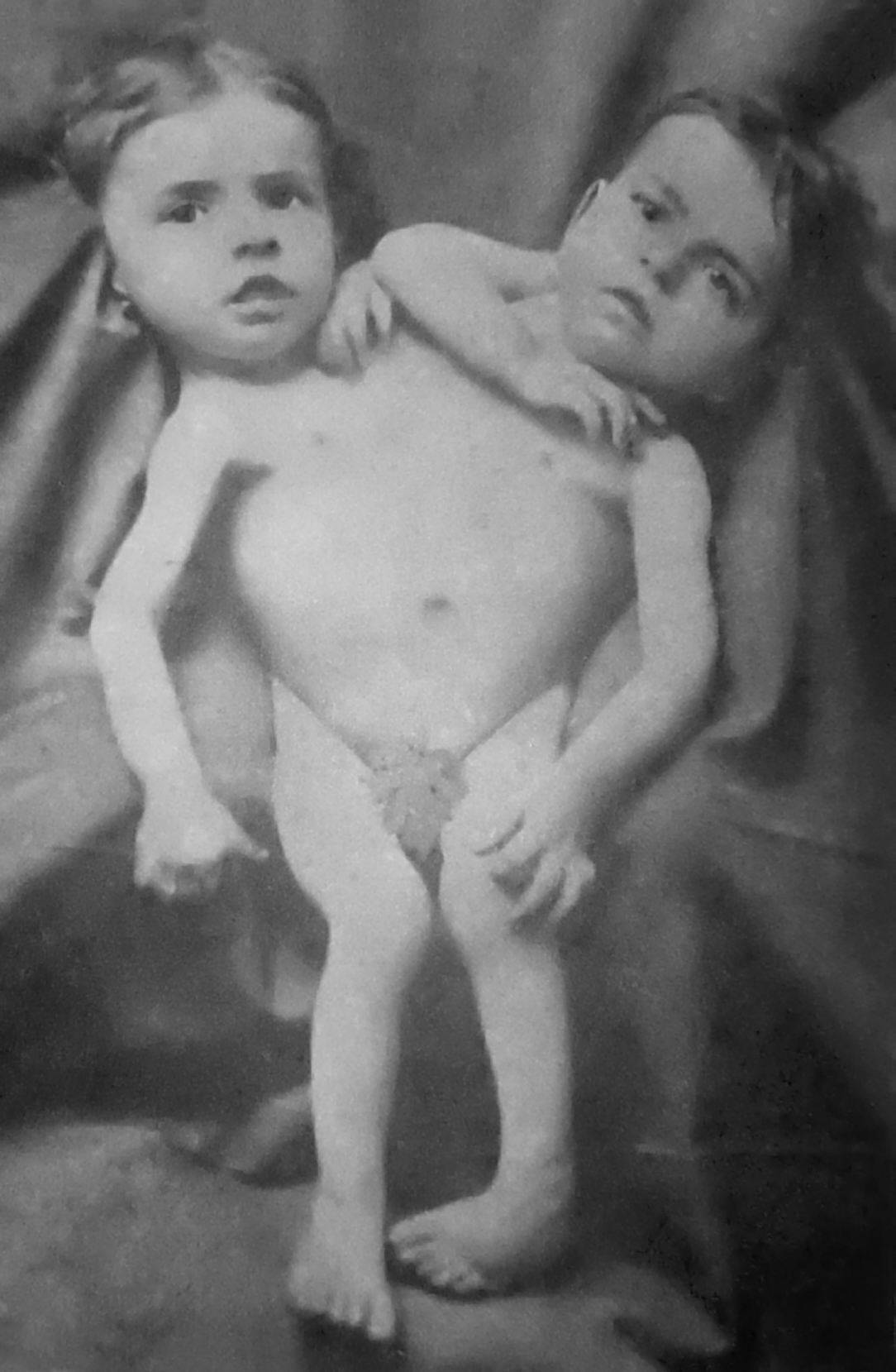
The Tocci Brothers, c. 1881

Polycephaly is the condition of having more than one head. The term is derived from the Greek stems poly (Greek: "πολύ") meaning "many" and kephalē (Greek: "κεφαλή") meaning "head". A polycephalic organism may be thought of as one being with a supernumerary body part, or as two or more beings with a shared body.

Two-headed animals (called bicephalic or dicephalic) and three-headed (tricephalic) animals are formed by the same process as conjoined twins from monozygotic twin embryos.

In humans, there are two forms of twinning that can lead to two heads being supported by a single torso. In dicephalus parapagus dipus, the bodies are joined at the sides and the two heads are separate. In craniopagus parasiticus, the two heads are joined directly to each other, but only one head has a functional torso—‌in most cases, this manifests as an underdeveloped twin head joined to the head of a developed twin. Documented survival into childhood is extremely rare. Survival to adulthood is rare, but does occur in some forms of dicephalus parapagus dipus, as was reported in a case of dicephalic twin born at 36 weeks of gestation to a multigravida mother in central India.

There are many occurrences of multi-headed animals in mythology. In heraldry and vexillology, the double-headed eagle is a common symbol, though no such animal is known to have ever existed.

== Occurrences ==
Two-headed people and animals, though rare, have long been known to exist and documented.

=== Occurrence in humans ===
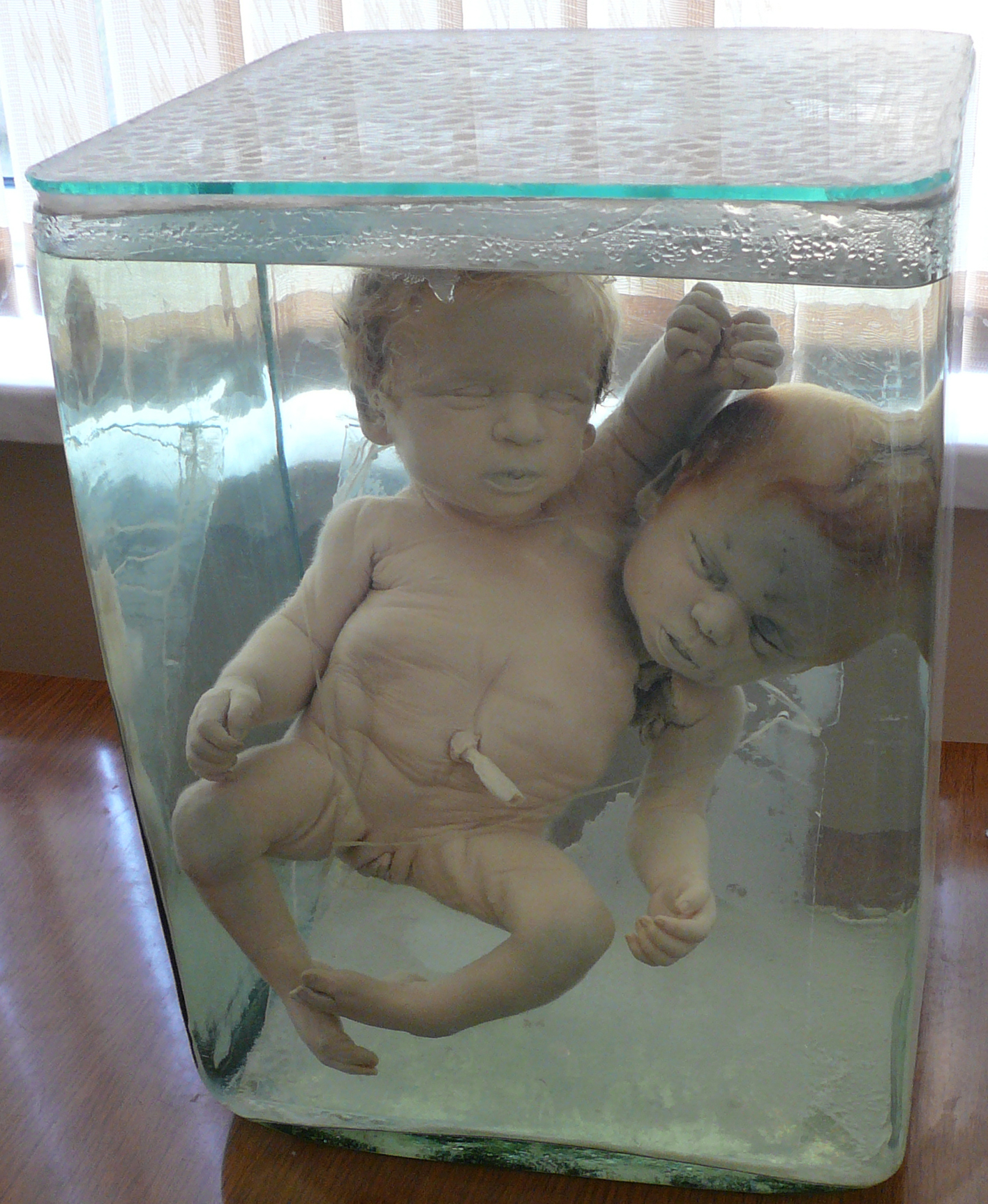
A (female) case of Dicephalus parapagus.

In humans, as in other animals, partial twinning can result in formation of two heads supported by a single torso. Two ways this can happen are dicephalus parapagus, where there are two heads side by side, and craniopagus parasiticus, where the heads are joined directly.

==== Dicephalus parapagus dipus ====
In dicephalus parapagus dipus, the two heads are side by side, on a torso with two legs, with varying levels of twinning of organs and structures within the torso. The shared body may have four arms altogether, or three arms, or two arms only. There are Greek-based medical terms for the variations, e.g. dibrachius means two-armed and tribrachius means three-armed. Both heads may contain a fully formed brain, or one may be anencephalic. If carried to term, dicephalus parapagus twins are usually stillborn, or die soon after birth. Survival to adulthood does however occasionally occur in cases where the twins are born with three to four arms. Chances of survival are improved if two complete hearts are present. Separation surgery is contraindicated, except in cases where one of the twins is clearly dying. Case reports of early diagnosis and outcomes, including the Turkish prenatal case and the Nigerian anencephalic variant, add credibility to claims about survival and medical complexity

Giacomo and Giovanni Battista Tocci (born between 1875 and 1877), were dicephalus parapagus dipus twins who survived to adulthood. Each had his own pair of arms. They learned to speak several languages, but never learned to walk. Abigail and Brittany Hensel, born in 1990, are another instance of dicephalus parapagus dipus twins who grew up. They were born with two functional arms, plus a vestigial third arm, which was surgically removed. Each twin has her own complete head, heart and spine, and controls one arm and one leg. They developed good motor skills, and completed courses at school and university.

==== Craniopagus parasiticus ====
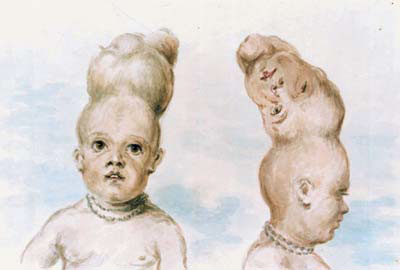
Drawing of the eighteenth century Boy of Bengal, affected by craniopagus parasiticus.

Craniopagus parasiticus is an extremely rare condition in which the two heads are joined directly together, and one twin (known as the autosite) has a functioning torso, while the other (known as the parasite) has only a vestigial torso. The parasite is supported by blood supplied from the autosite head. This threatens the life of the autosite by placing an additional burden on the autosite's vital organs. Operations to separate the two heads have been performed in the hope of saving the autosite.

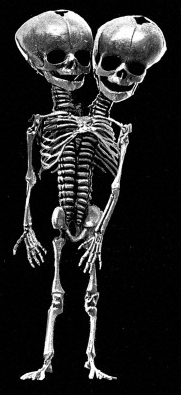
Skeletal structure in a case of dicephalus parapagus dipus. From: Hirst & Piersol, 1893.

=== Occurrence in animals ===
Polycephalic animals often make local news headlines when found. The most commonly observed two-headed animals are turtles and snakes. Other species with known two-headed occurrences include cattle, sheep, pigs, cats, dogs, and fish. In 1894, a two-headed partridge was reported in Boston, Massachusetts. It was notable as a dicephalic animal for surviving into adulthood with two perfect heads. Scientists have published in modern journals about dissecting such animals since at least the 1930s. A 1929 paper studied the anatomy of a two-headed kitten.

Polycephalic animals, due to their rarity, are a subject of novelty. "We", a two-headed albino rat snake born in captivity in 2000 with both female and male genitalia, was scheduled to be auctioned on eBay with an expected price tag of $150,000 (£87,000), though their policy of not trading in live animals prevented the sale. On October 31, 2006, the World Aquarium announced that "We" was adopted by Nutra Pharma Corporation, a biotechnology company developing treatments using modified cobra venom and cobratoxin. "We" died of natural causes at age seven in June 2007.

Two-headed farm animals sometimes travel with animal side shows to county fairs. Most notably, The Venice Beach Freakshow supposedly houses the largest collection of two-headed specimens in the world, including over 20 two-headed animals that are alive. Many museums of natural history contain preserved two-headed animals. The Museum of Lausanne in Lausanne, Switzerland, and the Ripley's Believe It or Not! museum in Gatlinburg, Tennessee, have collections of preserved two-headed animals. A very well preserved 2-headed lamb is on display in Llanidloes museum in Wales. A live two-headed tortoise named Janus can be seen at the Natural History Museum in Geneva, Switzerland.

==== Anatomy and fitness ====
In cases where multiple heads are fully developed and non-parasitic, they share control of the organs and limbs, though the specific structure of the connections varies. Animals often move in a disoriented and dizzy fashion, with the brains "arguing" with each other; some animals simply zig-zag without getting anywhere. Snake heads may attack and even attempt to swallow each other. Thus, polycephalic animals survive poorly in the wild compared to normal monocephalic animals.

Most two-headed snakes only live for a few months, though some have been reported to live a full life and even reproduced, with the offspring born normal. A two-headed black rat snake with separate throats and stomachs survived for 20 years. There is some speculation that the inbreeding of snakes in captivity increases the chances of a two-headed birth.

=== Questions on number of organisms ===
It is difficult to draw the line between what is considered "one animal with two heads" or "two animals that share a body".

Abigail and Brittany Hensel, born in 1990, were given two distinct names at birth. They identify as two people, and are recognised as two people legally and socially. On the other hand, Syafitri, born 2006 in Indonesia, was given one name by her parents because she only had one heart. In early Germany, conjoined twins that could not be separated were legally considered one person. Millie and Christine McKoy were often referred to in the singular, including by themselves, with the name "Millie-Christine", as well as plural.

In Peter Mogila’s 17-century Catechism, the following instructions are given for baptism of polycephalic infants: should there be distinct heads and distinct chests, this means there are separate people each of whom must be baptised normally; if the heads and chests are not completely distinct from each other, however, one person must be baptised normally but baptism of the other(s) should be preluded by the formula "if not already baptised".

With other animals, polycephaly is usually described as "one animal with two heads". One of the heads, especially in three-headed animals, may be poorly developed and malformed, and not "participate" much.

=== Two faces on one head ===
Where twinning of the head itself is only partial, it can result in the condition known as diprosopus—one head with two faces.

== Earliest known occurrence ==
The February 22, 2007, issue of the journal Biology Letters detailed the discovery of a 122 million-year-old fossil of a two-headed Hyphalosaurus lingyuanensis, marking the earliest known occurrence of axial bifurcation.

== List of notable occurrences ==
=== Humans ===
==== Dicephalic conjoined twins (dicephalus parapagus dipus) ====
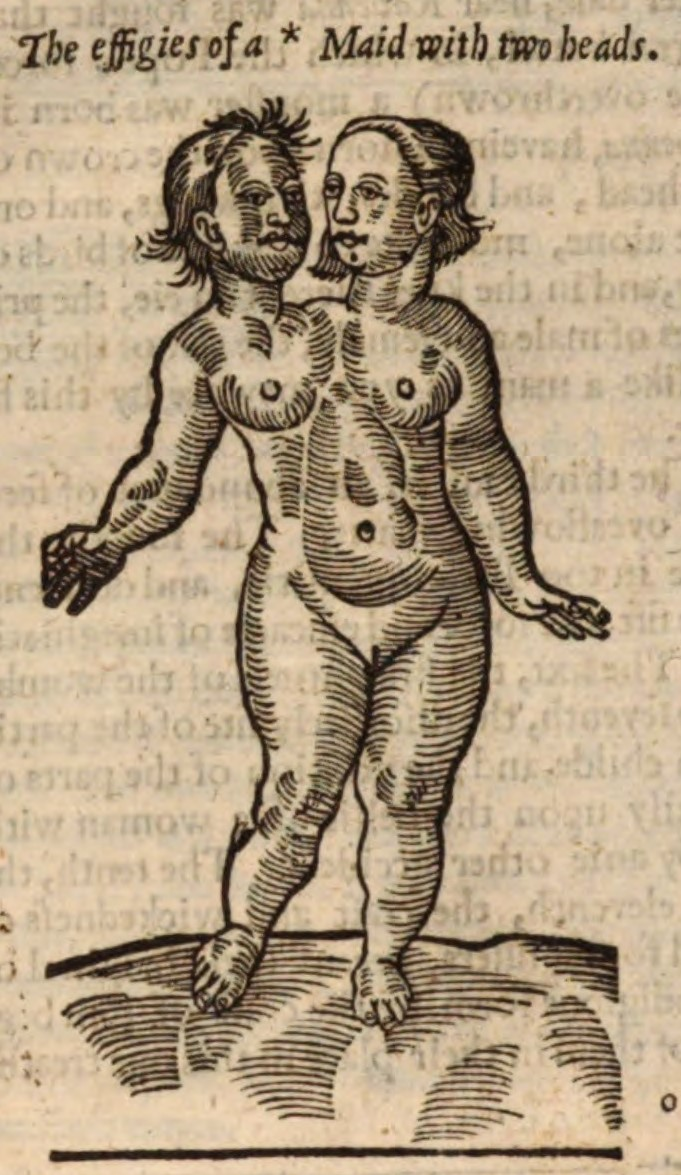
Lycosthenes' case, from Of Monsters and Prodigies (Pare, 1649)

- Lycosthenes, who lived in the 1500s, described a pair of adult female twins who had separate necks but one body. Both heads ate, drank, slept, and spoke. They had to beg from door to door, "everie one giveing (sic) to her freely". They were banished to Bavaria due to fears pregnant women who saw them would give birth to similar children; nothing else is known of them.
- In 1990, Abigail and Brittany Hensel were born in the United States and went on to star in their own television show.
- In 2000, Ayse and Sema Tanrikulu were born in Kahramanmaraş, Turkey.
- In June 2000, Carmen and Lupita Andrade were born in Mexico. They later moved to the United States with their parents for healthcare.
- In 2003, Sohna and Mohna were born in India.
- On June 13, 2003, twin girls named Huda and Manal Abdel Nasser Mohammed Mahmoud were born in Asyut, Egypt.
- In 2006, Syafitri was born in Indonesia. "Syafitri's parents gave the girls only one name because they shared one heart." Syafitri died in 2006.
- In 2007, Mary Grace and Mary Divine Asis were born in the Philippines with only one heart. They died on April 30, 2008.
- On August 25, 2008, a baby boy named Kiron was born with two heads in south-western Bangladesh. The baby was described by the gynaecologist present at the birth as having "one stomach and he is eating normally with his two mouths. He has one genital organ and a full set of limbs". He died on August 28, 2009.
- In July 2009, dicephalic twins were born in Indonesia with two hearts but sharing all other internal organs.
- In 2011, Sueli Ferreira gave birth to a child with two heads in Campina Grande, in Paraíba state, Brazil, but the baby died a few hours later because of lack of oxygen to one of the heads.
- On December 19, 2011, a pair of male twins, Emanoel and Jesus Nazare, were born in Marajó Island, Brazil. The children had two heads, two legs and two arms, sharing all the body below the neck. Each child had a separate spine, but shared a heart, liver, lungs and pelvis, and both brains functioned. The boys were featured on the Channel 4 programme Bodyshock on December 19, 2012, where it was reported they had died at six months.
- In March 2014, dicephalic twin girls were delivered via caesarian section at Cygnus JK Hindu Hospital in Sonipat, Haryana, in northern India. The babies reportedly have two heads, two necks and two spinal columns but share all major organs.

==== Craniopagus parasiticus ====
Craniopagus parasiticus is a condition in which a parasitic twin head with an undeveloped or underdeveloped body is attached to the head of a developed twin. Only four cases have been documented by modern medicine to have survived birth:

- In 1783 the "Two-Headed Boy of Bengal" was born in India; the second head was joined roughly upside down on top of the developed twin's head. The boy survived until 1787 when killed by a snakebite.
- In 2003 Rebeca Martinez was born in the Dominican Republic with an extra head but died after surgery at the age of 8 weeks.
- In 2004 Egyptian Naglaa Mohamed gave birth to Manar Maged who had the head and undeveloped torso of another child attached. In 2005 the second head was removed and later that year Naglaa appeared on The Oprah Winfrey Show with her surviving child. Manar died from a brain infection in 2006.
- On January 20, 2021, a baby was born with two heads at the Elias Hospital in Bucharest, Romania, but died some hours after being born.

=== Non-human mammals ===
==== Cats ====
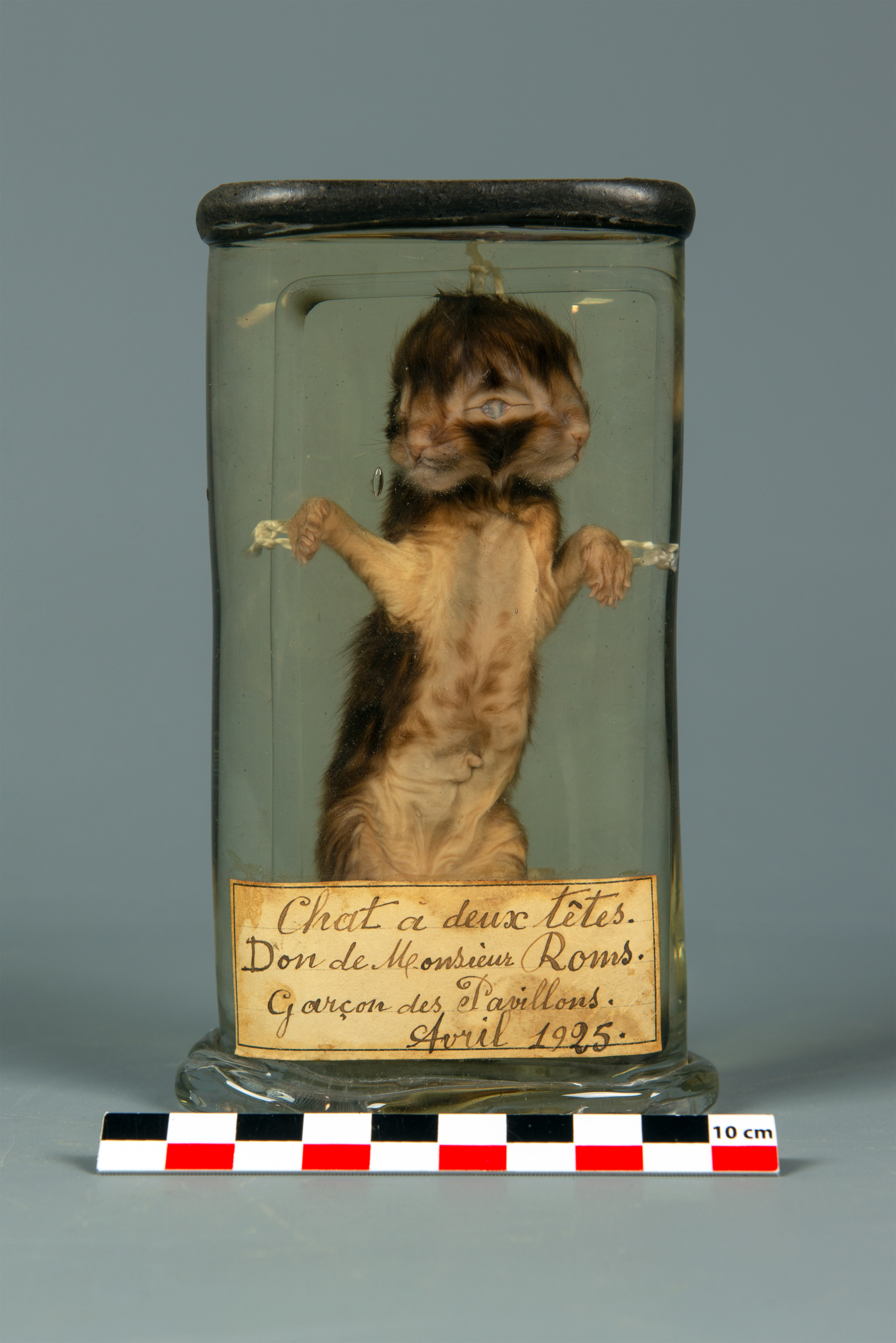
Two-faced kitten (Sorbonne University)

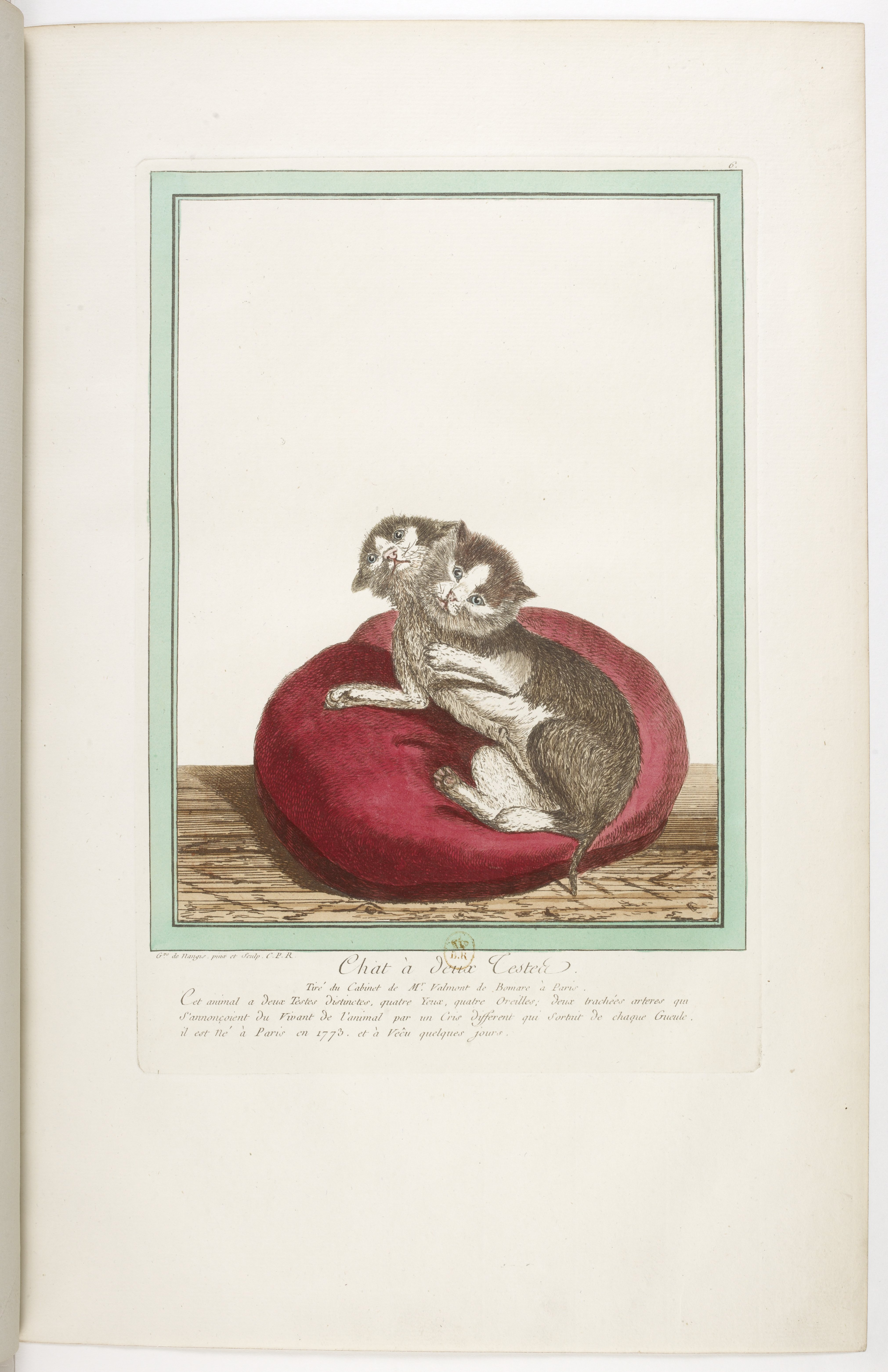
Two-headed cat born in Paris, 1773. It only lived for a few hours.

There have been numerous reports of two-faced cats; most die soon after birth. Reports of two-headed kittens are common, relative to other animals, because of their status as household pets. Recent two-headed kittens include:

- On May 20, 2020, a two-faced kitten named Biscuits and Gravy was born in Oregon. He died after three days.
- On June 11, 2013, a two-faced kitten named Deucy was born in Amity, Oregon. She died two days later.
- In November 2008, a two-faced kitten was born in Perth, Australia.
- In 2006, Tiger, a two-faced kitten, was born in Grove City, Ohio.
- In March 2006, Deuce, a two-faced kitten, was born in Lake City, Florida, and was euthanized shortly thereafter, having come down with pneumonia.
- In June 2006, Image, a two-faced kitten, was born and died later that year in Philadelphia, Pennsylvania.
- In June 2005, Gemini, a two-faced kitten, was born in Glide, Oregon.

==== Cattle ====
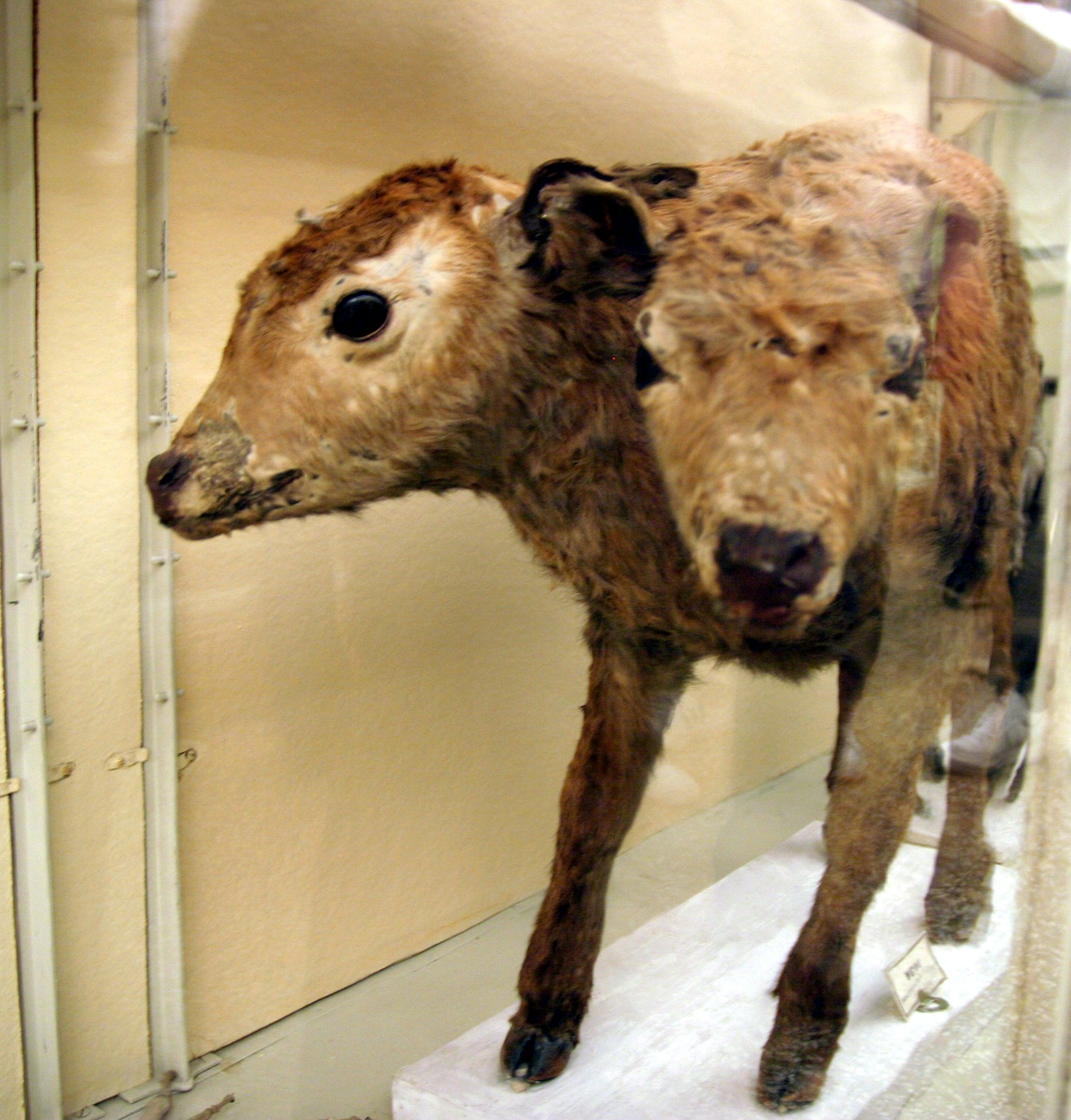
Two-headed calf, Lausanne

- A head mount of a two-headed calf is on display in the Museum at the Georgia State Capitol Building in Atlanta, Georgia.
- A two-headed calf was born in Frankston, Texas, on February 13, 2009. Reportedly, the owner/rancher, J. R. Newman immediately took the calf to his local veterinarian for examination/treatment. The veterinarian, Dr. James Brown, was quoted by a local reporter as saying, "I've seen slight variations [of this condition] but nothing like this before. This is by no means normal."
- A taxidermy of a two-headed calf can be found in St. Petersburg, Russia, in Kunstkamera.
- A two-headed calf, born dead, made local news in Bartın, Türkiye.

==== Pigs ====
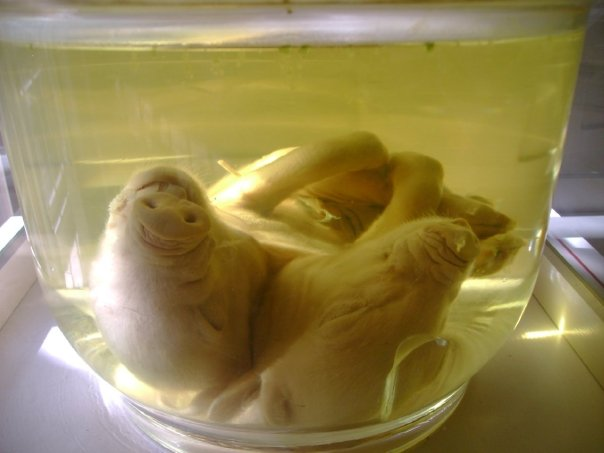
Two-headed piglet; Old State House, Hartford, Connecticut

- In 1998, Rudy, a two-headed pig, was born in Iowa.

==== Goats and sheep ====
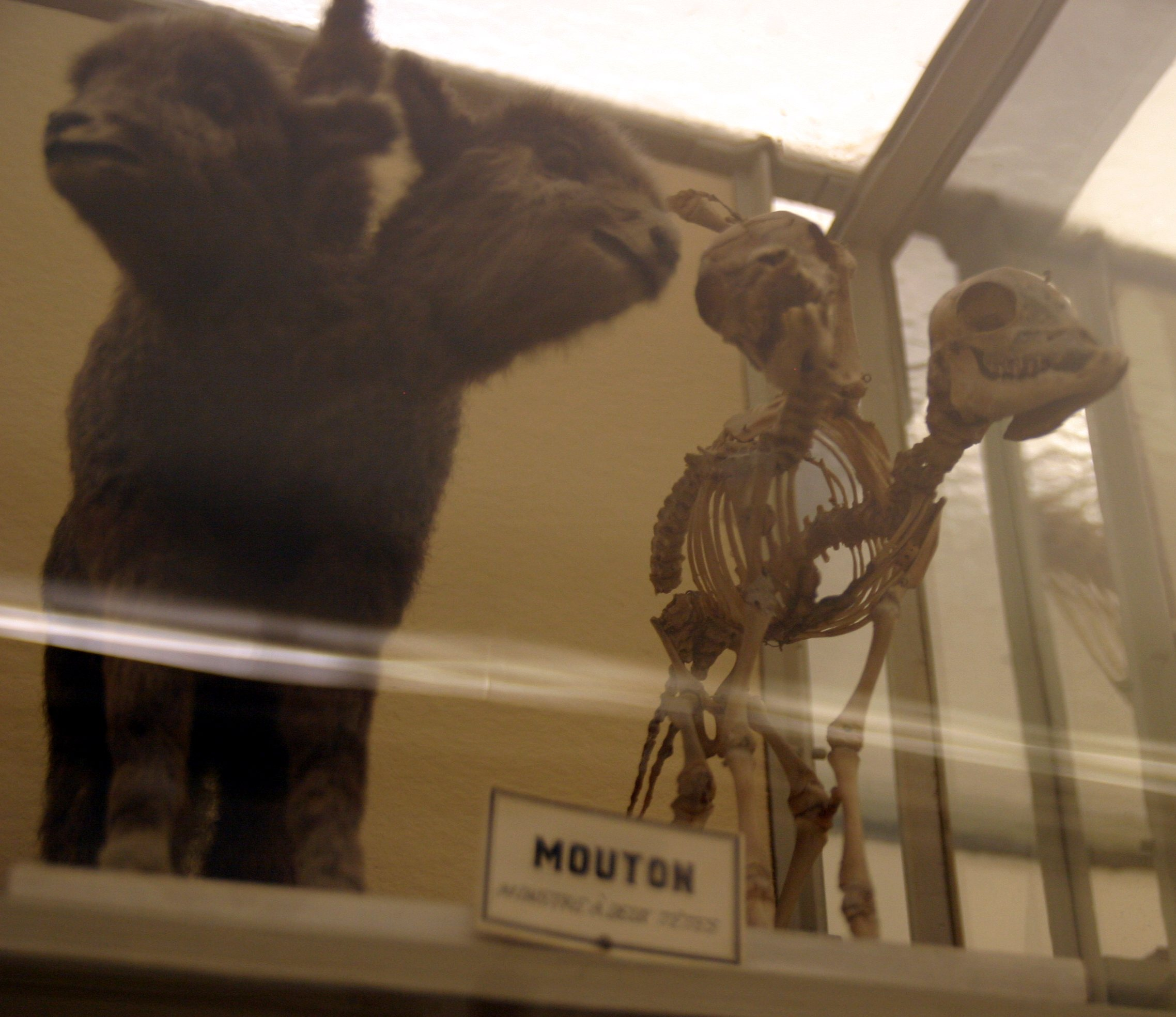
Two-faced lamb, Lausanne

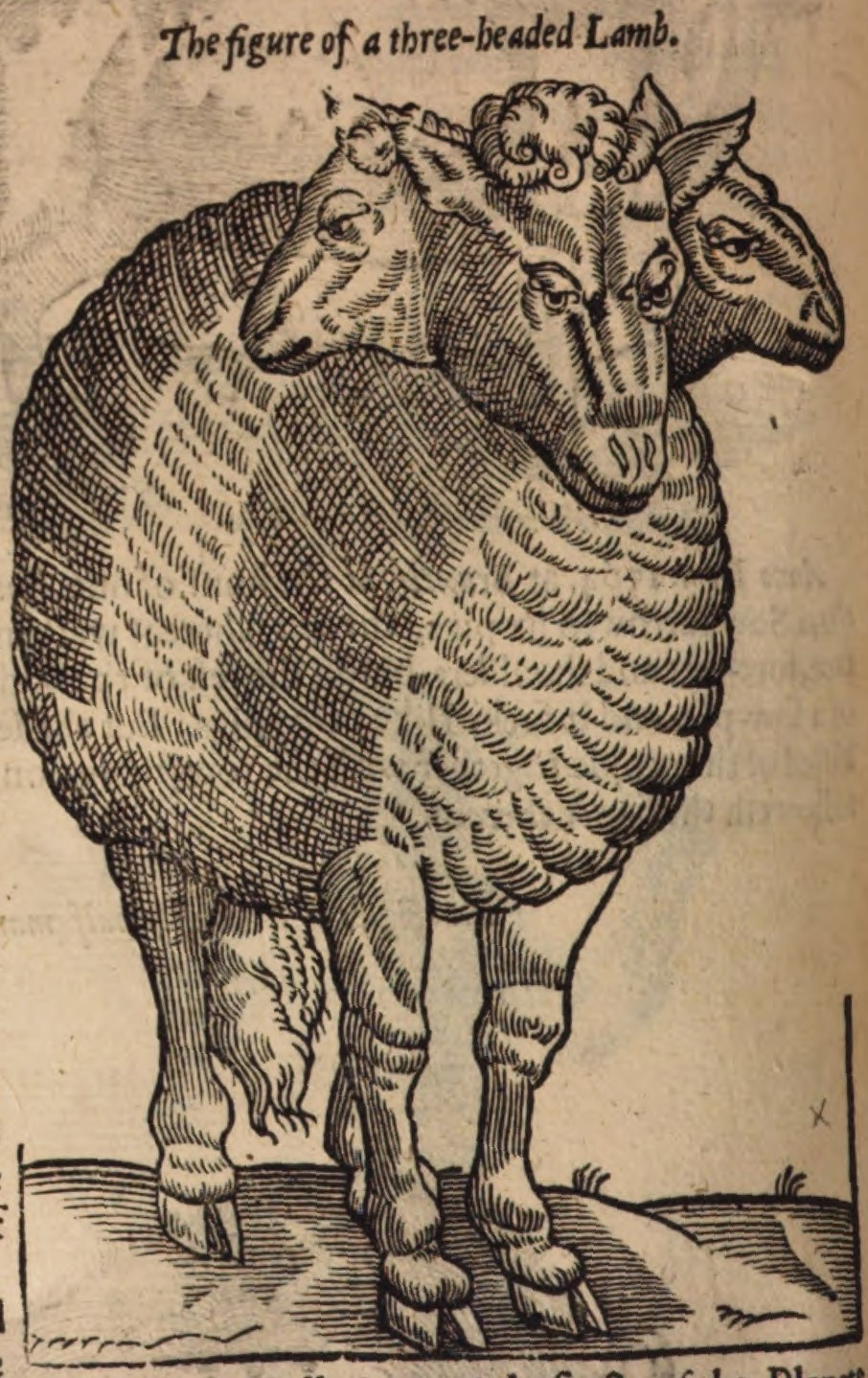
3-headed lamb, born 1577

- In 1577, a lamb with three heads was born in Blandy, France, and illustrated in Ambroise Pare's Of Monsters and Prodigies. All three heads would bleat simultaneously, the center head being the largest of the three. It appears to have survived into adulthood.
- Maine's Conant Museum had an adult sheep skeleton with two heads.

==== Mice ====
- A two-headed mouse was seen in Halle.

=== Reptiles ===
==== Snakes ====
Most polycephalic snakes do not live long, but some captive individuals do.

- Woman saw a 2-headed snake, alive, in the Jardin des Plantes, Paris, in 1853.
- Lady found a 2-headed snake in a field near Philadelphia.
- A two-headed black rat snake with separate throats and stomachs survived for 20 years.
- There are several preserved two-headed snakes on display in the Museum at the Georgia State Capitol Building in Atlanta.
- "We", the two-headed albino rat snake (see above).
- A two-headed ladder snake, Elaphe scalaris, was discovered near the village of Pinoso, Spain.
- A two-headed king snake lived for nearly 17 years at the Arizona State University.
- An extremely rare two-headed albino Honduran milk snake named Medusa was bought by Todd Ray.

==== Turtles and Tortoises ====
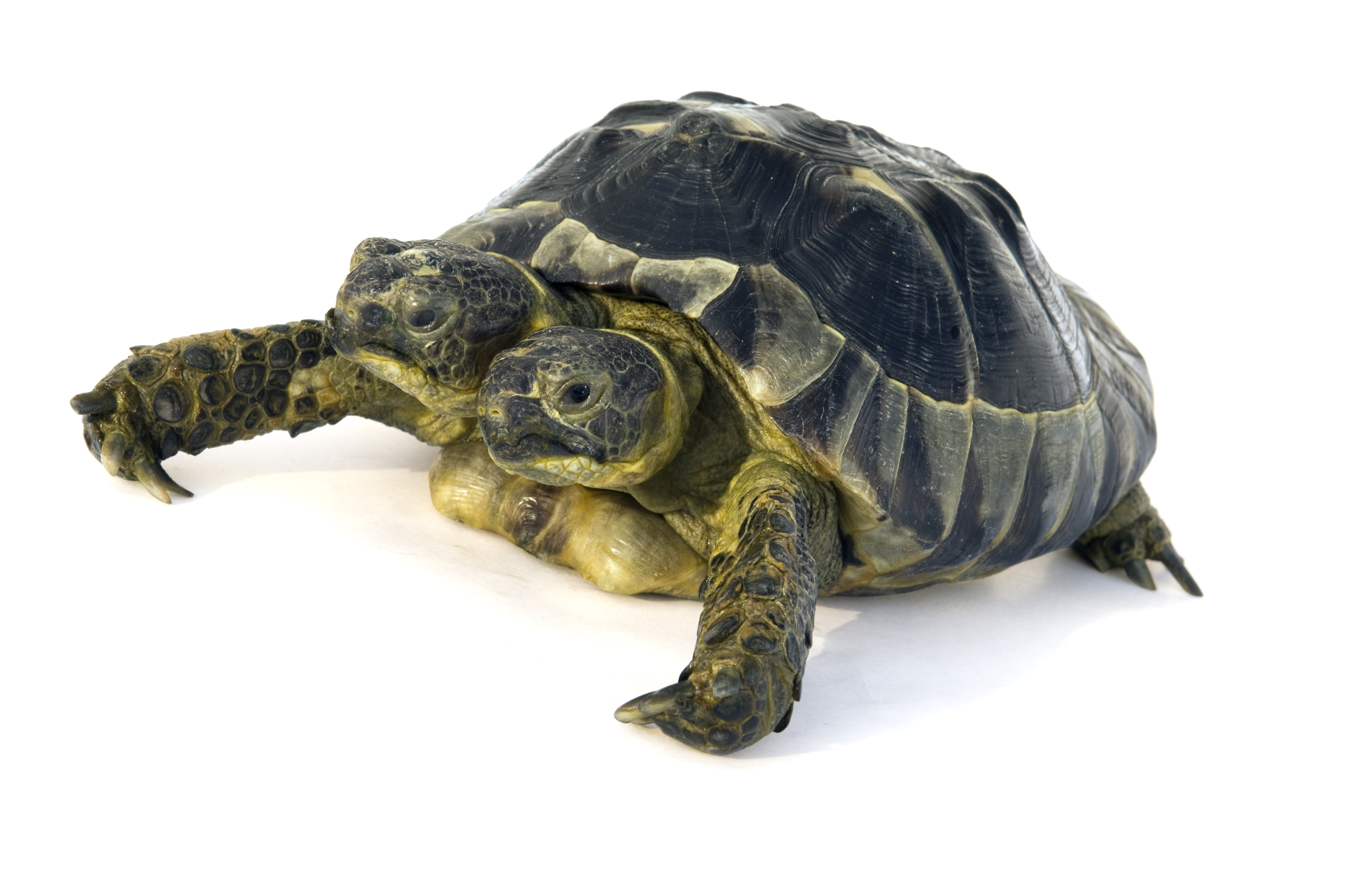
The Greek tortoise "Janus", born in 1997, is in the Museum of Natural History of Geneva, pictured here in 2008.

Two-headed turtles and tortoises are rare but not unknown. Recent discoveries include:

- Born in 1997, a living two-headed Greek tortoise named Janus was displayed in the Museum of Natural History of Geneva in December 2021.
- In 1999, a three-headed turtle was discovered in Tainan, Taiwan, by a villager named Lin Chi-fa.
- In 2003, a two-headed angulate tortoise was discovered in South Africa, with the only other known case in the region reported in the early 1980s.
- In 2004, Solomon and Sheba, a two-headed Mediterranean spur-thighed tortoise, was born in Dorchester, England.
- In 2005, a two-headed olive ridley sea turtle was found in Costa Rica by the World Wildlife Fund.
- A baby turtle of unknown species was also reported in Havana, Cuba, in 2005.
- In 2006, a two-headed, six-limbed soft-shell turtle in Singapore named "Double Happiness" was also featured on a local television program, and again on another program in late 2006.
- As of 2007, there is a fully preserved common snapping turtle named Emily with two heads at the Science Museum of Minnesota.
- A two-headed turtle named Thelma and Louise was born at the San Antonio Zoo on June 18, 2013.
- A two-headed yellow-bellied slider named "Jim and I" was found in Badin Lake, NC, and lived at the Herpetarium in the Greensboro Science Center in North Carolina until their death.
- A two-headed turtle was found on the Cape Hatteras National Seashore by the National Park Service during a nest inspection on August 16, 2021.
- A bicephalid (two-headed) Trachemys scripta elegans (Red-eared slider), born in 2015, is owned and cared for by Dr. Will Kirby.

==== Choristoderes ====
In 2006, a paper published by the British Royal Society reported the discovery of a fossil of a two-headed embryo or neonate of the long-necked choristodere reptile Hyphalosaurus, which was the first record of fossilized polycephaly.

=== Birds ===
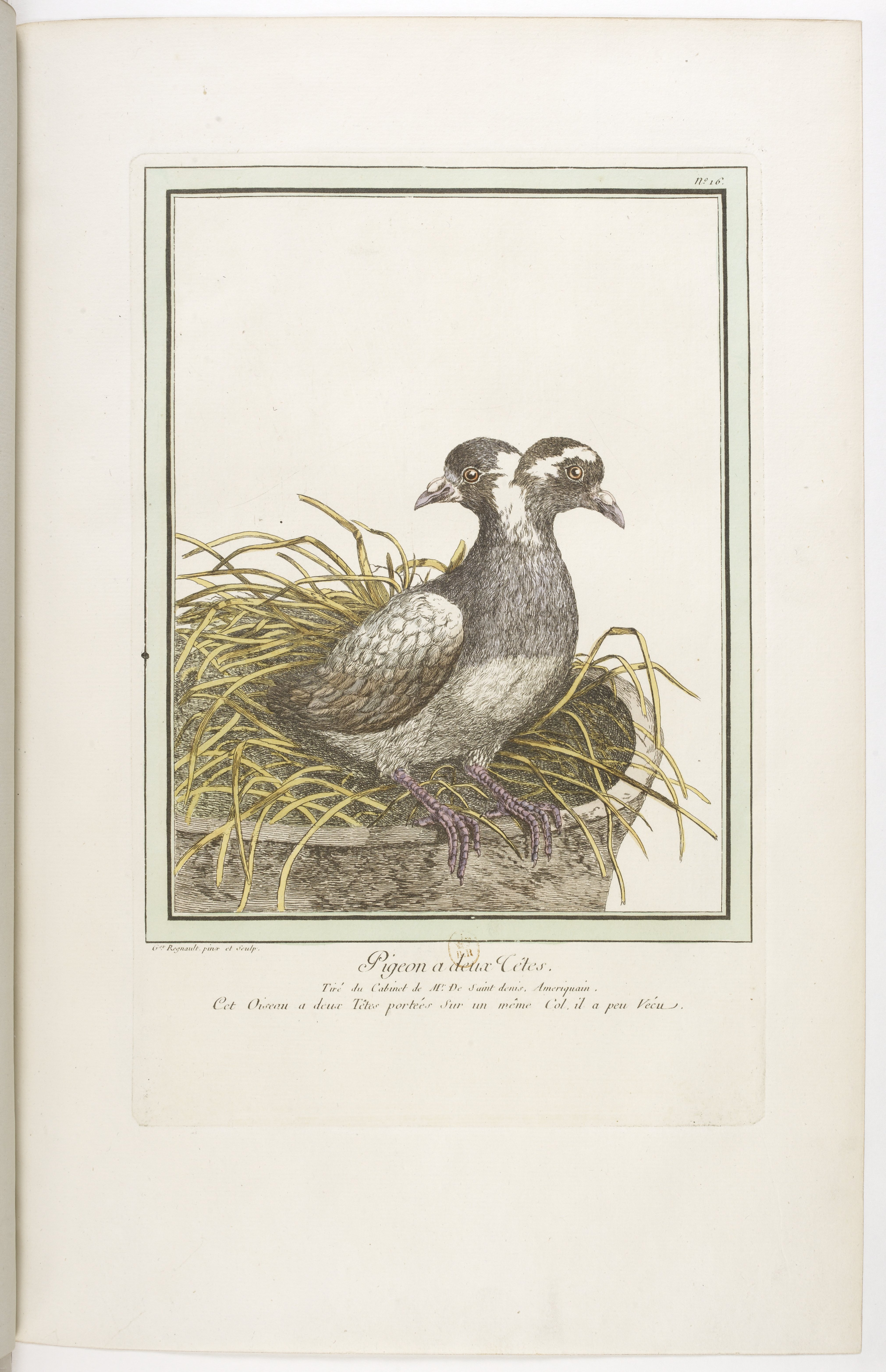
2-headed pigeon, 1775

- An account of a two-headed pigeon was published in France in 1734.
- In 2020, a two-headed song thrush was poached in Syria.

== Mythological occurrences ==
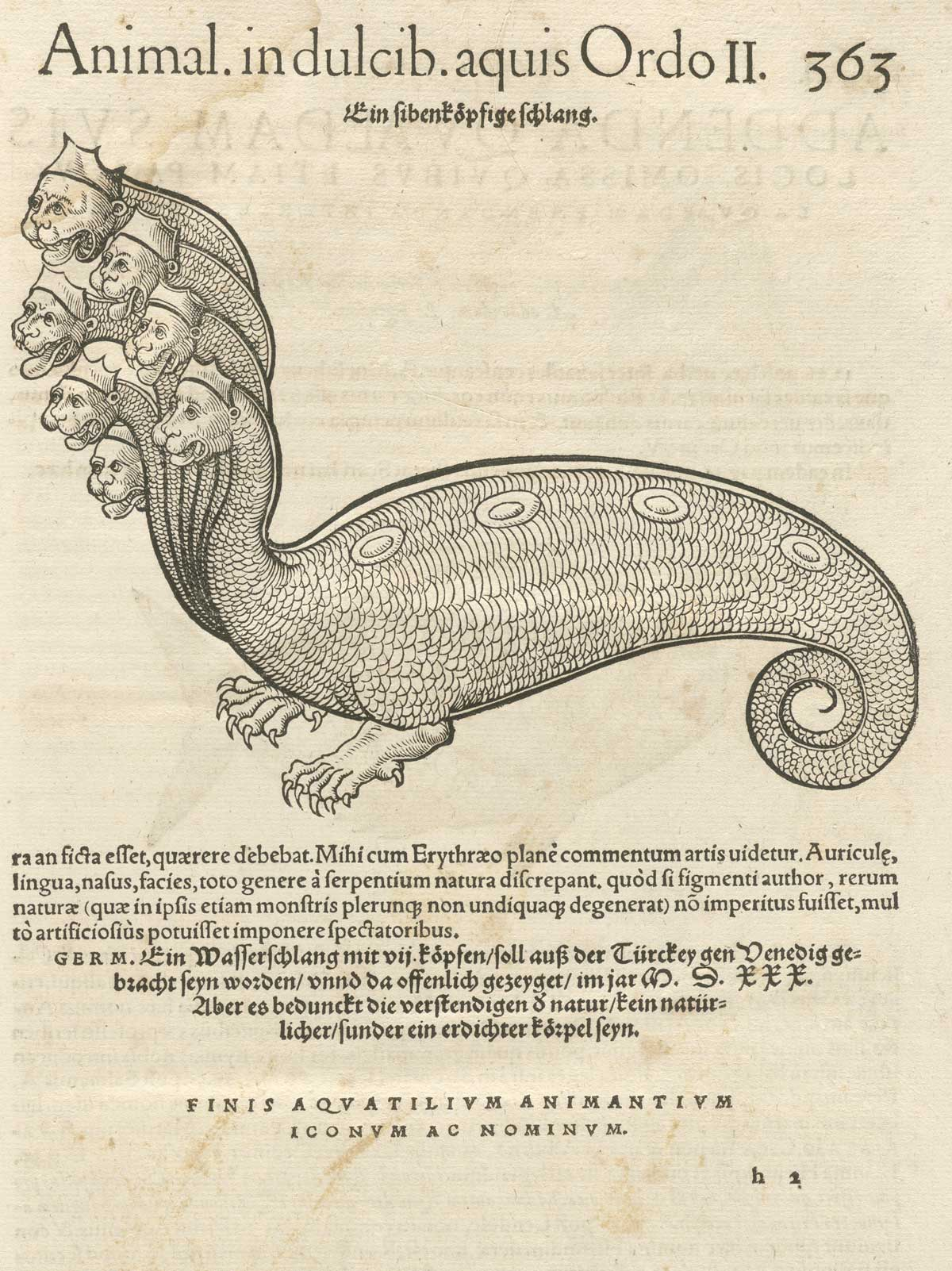
The 16th-century German zoologist Conrad Gesner has been influenced by the Beast of Revelation in his depiction of the Hydra in volume four of Historiae Animalium.

=== Mesopotamian mythology ===
- Mušmaḫḫū, a seven-headed serpent related to mythology of Ninurta, and Ningishzida. Sometimes related to Mušḫuššu.
- Humbaba, the guardian of the Cedar Forest, where the gods lived. A description from Georg Burckhardt translation of Gilgamesh says, "he had the paws of a lion and a body covered in thorny scales; his feet had the claws of a vulture, and on his head were the horns of a wild bull; his tail and phallus each ended in a snake's head."

=== Greek mythology ===
Greek mythology contains a number of multi-headed creatures. Typhon, a vast grisly monster with many snake heads, is often described as having several offspring with Echidna, a creature with the lower body of a serpent but the upper body of a beautiful woman. Their offspring, by one source or another, account for many of the major monsters of Greek mythos, including:

- Cerberus – a monstrous multi-headed dog that guards the gate to Hades.
- Ladon – a sometimes hundred-headed serpent-like dragon that guards the garden of the Hesperides and is overcome by Heracles.
- Chimera – sometimes depicted with the heads of a goat and a lion.
- The Lernaean Hydra – an ancient nameless serpent-like chthonic water beast that possessed numerous heads.
- Orthrus – a two-headed dog owned by Geryon.
- Scylla – sometimes described as a six-headed sea monster.

Other multi-headed creatures in Greek mythology include:

- The Hecatonchires – giants with fifty heads and one hundred arms. The word "Hecatonchire" means "hundred arms". They were the sons of Gaia, and Uranus.
- Hecate – Greek goddess of witches, nightmares, crossroads, and one of the Moon deities; sometimes represented with three heads.

=== Iranian mythology ===
Zahhak, an evil figure in Iranian mythology – also evident in ancient Iranian folklore as Aži Dahāka (Azh dahak) – is the most significant and long-lasting of the ažis of the Avesta, the earliest religious texts of Zoroastrianism. He is described as a monster with three mouths, six eyes, and three heads (presumably meaning three heads with one mouth and two eyes each), cunning, strong and demonic. But in other respects Aži Dahāka has human qualities, and is never a mere animal.

=== Hinduism ===
Hindu deities are often depicted with multiple arms or heads.

- The fire-god Agni has two heads
- Dattatreya: three
- The creator-god Brahma: four
- The goddess Gayatri: five
- The war-god Kartikeya: six

Though usually depicted with one head, some deities like Ganesha (in Heramba form) and Shiva (Sadashiva) have aspects where they are depicted with multiple heads; five in this case. The Vishvarupa form of Vishnu is described as having infinite heads.

Besides deities, demons (asura and rakshasa) may be depicted with multiple heads. The demon-king Ravana is depicted and described as having ten heads, although sometimes he is shown with only nine heads because he has sacrificed a head to convince Shiva. Trishira, his son, is depicted with three heads.

Animal races in Hindu mythology like Nāgas (serpents) may have multiple heads. The Naga Shesha is depicted with five or seven hoods, but said to have infinite hoods. Uchchaihshravas is a celestial seven-headed horse. The divine white elephant Airavata is depicted with multiple heads, trunks and tusks.

=== Taoism ===
- Nezha, a god sometimes shown in "three heads and six arms" form

=== Occultism ===
- Bune, a dragon with the heads of a dog, a griffin, and a man, in occultism

=== Ancient Mediterranean civilizations ===
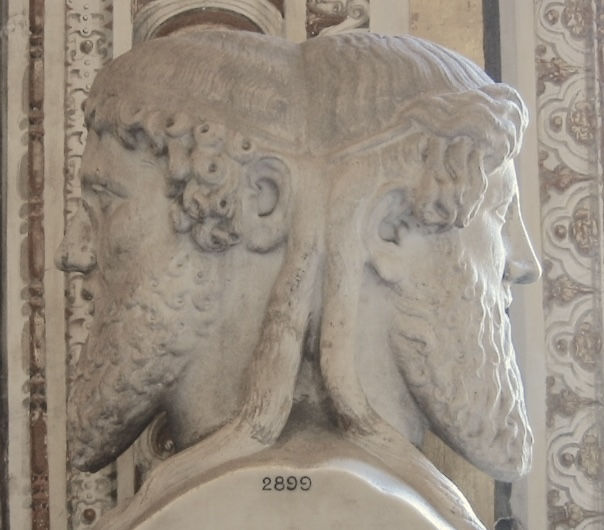
The two-headed Janus.

- Janus, a god in Roman mythology with a double-sided head
- Nehebkau, a two-headed snake in Egyptian mythology

=== European culture ===
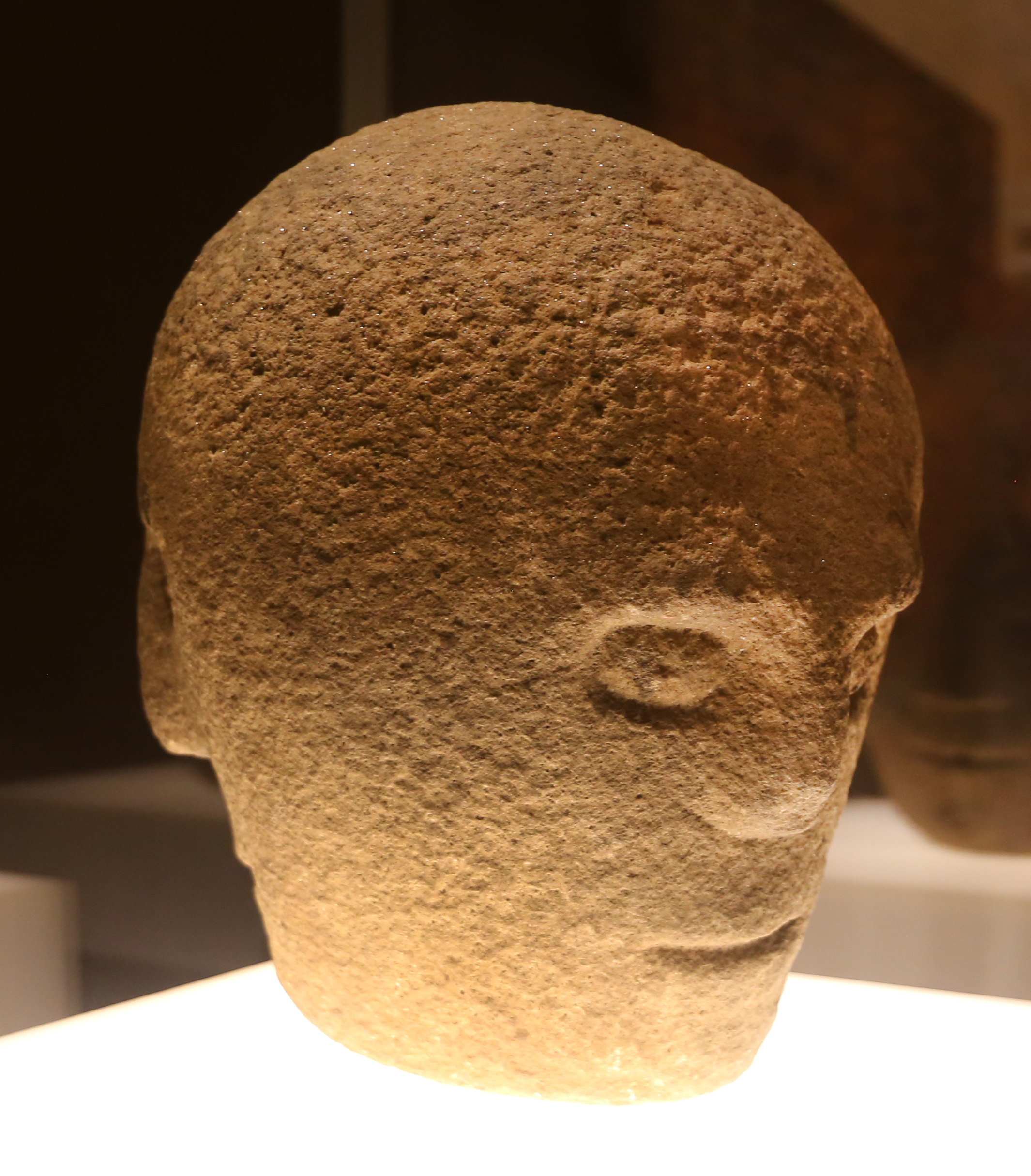
The Corleck Head, Irish, 1st century AD

- Various Ogres, Trolls, and Giants in European folklore and fairy tales
- Double-headed eagle, a heraldic symbol
- Triple-headed eagle, a heraldic symbol

=== Eastern Europe ===
- Balaur, a dragon with three, seven or twelve heads, in Romanian mythology
- Kulshedra, with three, seven or nine heads in Albanian mythology
- Svantevit, four-headed god of war and divination in Slavic mythology
- Triglav (meaning "three headed") is a god or complex of gods in Slavic mythology
- Zmey Gorynych, a dragon in Slavic mythology
- Dragons in Hungarian folklore usually have three or seven heads

=== Northern Europe ===
- Þrúðgelmir, a six-headed giant in Norse mythology

=== Japan ===
- Yamata no Orochi, an eight-headed snake in Japanese mythology

=== Korea ===
- Jihaguk Daejeok, a nine-headed giant in Korean mythology

=== Judaism ===
The Talmud (Brachot 61a) says that originally Adam was created as a single body with two faces (which were then separated into two bodies - male (Adam) & female (Eve)).

The Zohar (introduction 1:9B / p. 9B) speaks of descendants of Cain with 2 heads.

The Talmud (Menachot 37a) records an incident in which Phlimo asked Judah the Prince which head a two headed person should put on Tefillin. Judah was initially dismissive, but then another man came in saying that his wife had just given birth to a two headed baby, and asked a (different) halachic question.

== Heraldry ==
- Double-headed eagle
- Triple-headed eagle

== See also ==
- Amphisbaena
- Cephalic disorder
- Chimera
- Conjoined twins
- The Corleck Head
- Diprosopus
- Janus
- Supernumerary body part
- Three hares
- Vladimir Demikhov
