= Conjoined twins =

- Other names: Siamese twin
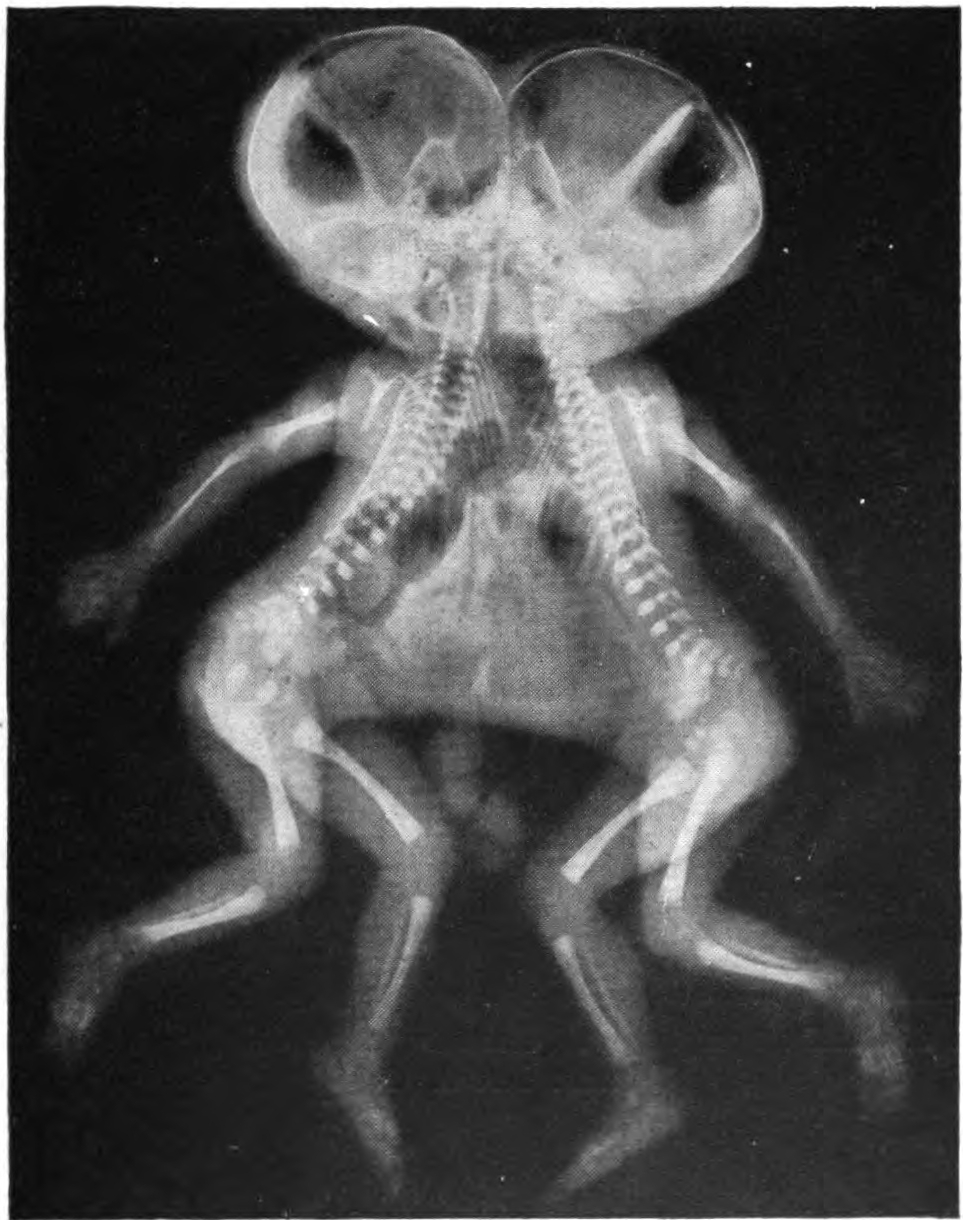
- X-ray of conjoined twins, Cephalothoracopagus.
- Specialty: Medical genetics
- Symptoms: Bodies fused, situs inversus (flipped organs) in one twin (rare)
- Complications: Depends on type
- Usual onset: Beginning of pregnancy
- Duration: Lifelong
- Types: See article
- Causes: Incomplete fission
- Treatment: Surgery, symptomatic care
- Prognosis: Depends on type; occasionally may survive

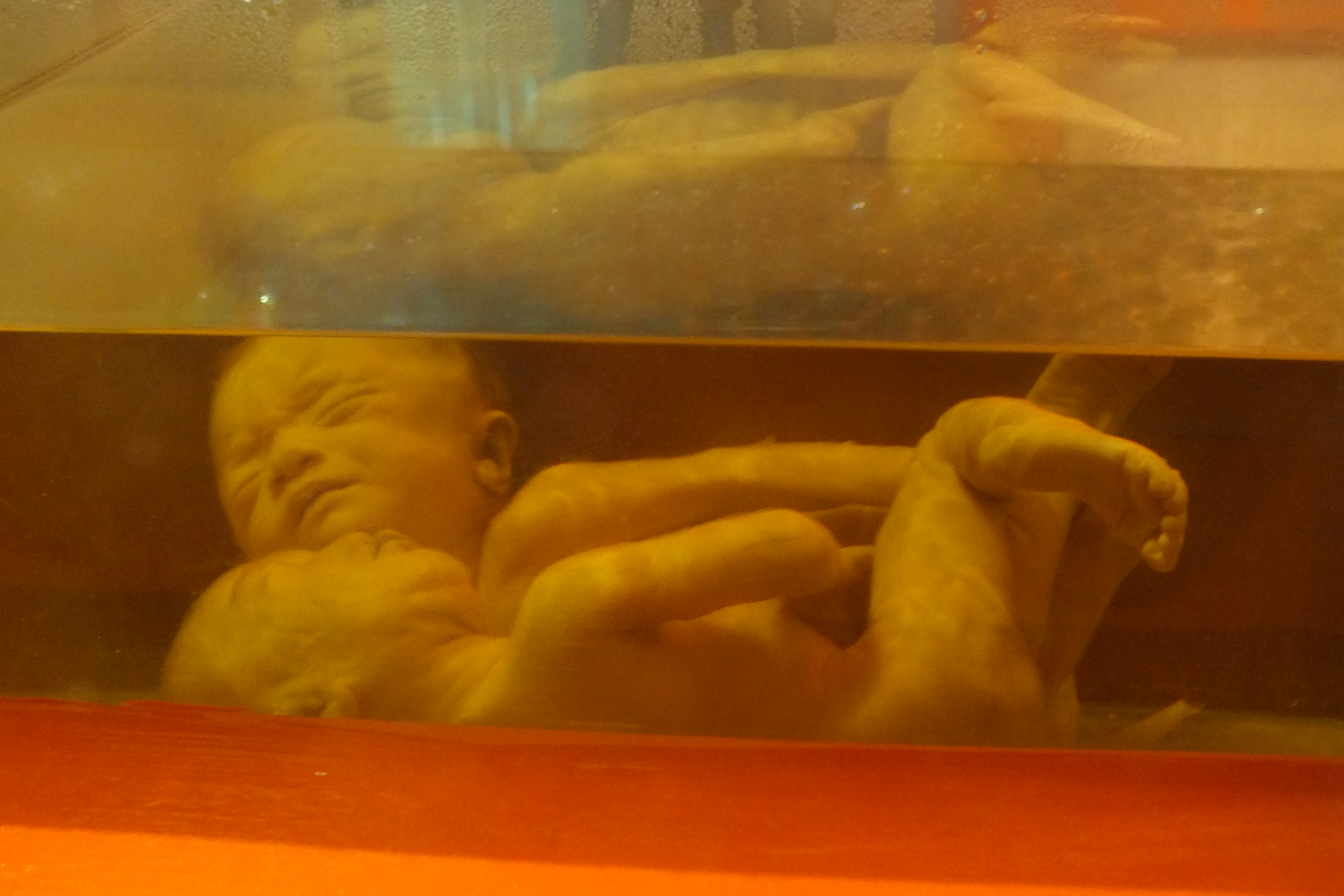
Conjoined twins (War Remnants Museum)

Conjoined twins, popularly referred to as Siamese twins, are twins joined in utero. (Note: Conjoined twins are almost universally assumed to always be monozygotic, but dizygotic conjoined twins are theoretically possible.) It is estimated to occur in anywhere between one in 50,000 births to one in 200,000 births, with a somewhat higher incidence in southwest Asia and Africa. Approximately half are stillborn, and an additional one-third die within 24 hours. Most live births are female, with a ratio of 3:1.

Two possible explanations of the cause of conjoined twins have been proposed. The one that is generally accepted is fission, in which the fertilized egg splits partially. The other explanation, no longer believed to be accurate, is fusion, in which the fertilized egg completely separates, but stem cells (that search for similar cells) find similar stem cells on the other twin and fuse the twins together. Conjoined twins and some monozygotic, but not conjoined, twins share a single common chorion, placenta, and amniotic sac in utero.

Chang and Eng Bunker (1811–1874) were brothers born in Siam (now Thailand) who traveled widely for many years and were known internationally as the Siamese Twins. Chang and Eng were joined at the torso by a band of flesh and cartilage, and by their fused livers. In modern times, they could easily have been separated. Due to the brothers' fame and the rarity of the condition, the term Siamese twins came to be associated with conjoined twins.

== Causes ==
There are two hypotheses about the development of conjoined twins.

1. a single fertilized egg does not fully split during the process of forming identical twins. If the zygote division occurs after two weeks of the development of the embryonic disc, it results in the formation of conjoined twins.
2. fusion of two fertilized eggs occurs early in development.

Partial splitting of the primitive node and streak may result in the formation of conjoined twins. These twins are classified according to the nature and degree of their union. Occasionally, monozygotic twins are connected only by a common skin bridge or by a common liver bridge. The type of twins formed depends on when and to what extent abnormalities of the node and streak occurred. Misexpression of genes, such as goosecoid, may also result in conjoined twins. Goosecoid activates inhibitors of BMP4 and contributes to regulation of head development. Over- or underexpression of this gene in laboratory animals results in severe malformations of the head region, including duplications, similar to some types of conjoined twins.

== Types ==
Conjoined twins are typically classified by the point at which their bodies are joined. The most common types of conjoined twins are:

- Thoracopagus (28% of cases): Two bodies fused from the upper chest to the lower chest. These twins usually share a heart and may also share the liver or part of the digestive system. Survival rate is poor.
- Thoraco-omphalopagus (18.5%): Two bodies fused from the upper chest to lower belly. The heart is always shared in these cases. As of 2015, twins who share a heart have not been able to both survive separation; a designated twin who is allotted the heart may survive if the other twin is sacrificed.
- Omphalopagus (10%): Two bodies fused at the lower abdomen. Unlike thoracopagus, the heart is not shared; however, the twins often share a liver, a digestive system, a diaphragm and other organs. Survival rate is 82%.
- Heteropagus (parasitic twin) (10%): Twins that are asymmetrically conjoined, resulting in one twin that is small, less formed, and dependent on the larger twin's organs for survival.
- Craniopagus (6%): Fused skulls, but separate bodies. These twins' heads may be conjoined at the back, front, or side of the head, but not on the face or at the base of the skull. Survival rate is poor.

Other, less common types of conjoined twins include:

- Cephalopagus: Two faces on opposite sides of a single, conjoined head; the upper portion of the body is fused while the bottom portions are separate. These twins generally cannot survive due to severe malformations of the brain. This is also known as janiceps (after the two-faced Roman deity Janus).
- Syncephalus: One head with a single face but four ears and two bodies.
- Cephalothoracopagus: Bodies fused at the head and thorax, with two faces facing in opposite directions, or sometimes with a single face and an enlarged skull.
- Xiphopagus: Two bodies fused in the xiphoid cartilage, which extends approximately from the navel to the lower breastbone. These twins almost never share any vital organs, with the exception of the liver. A famous example is Chang and Eng Bunker.
- Ischiopagus: Fused lower half of the two bodies, with spines conjoined end-to-end at a 180° angle. These twins have four arms; one, two, three or four legs; and typically one set of external genitalia and one anus. Survival rate is 63%.
- Omphalo-ischiopagus: Fused in a similar fashion to ischiopagus twins, but facing each other, with a joined abdomen, akin to omphalopagus. These twins have four arms, and two, three, or four legs.
- Parapagus: Fused side by side with a shared pelvis. Those that are dithoracic parapagus are fused at the abdomen and pelvis, but not at the thorax. Those that are diprosopic parapagus have one trunk and two faces. Those that are dicephalic parapagus have one trunk and two heads, and may have two (dibrachius), three (tribrachius), or four (tetrabrachius) arms. Survival rate is poor.
- Craniopagus parasiticus: Like craniopagus, but with a second bodiless head attached to the dominant head.
- Pygopagus or Iliopagus: Two bodies joined at the pelvis. Survival rate is 68%.
- Rachipagus: Twins joined along the back of their bodies, with fusion of the vertebral arches and the soft tissue from the head to the buttocks. Twins of this type cannot be separated.
- Tricephalus (conjoined triplets): Extremely rare conjoining of 3 fetuses. Very few confirmed cases, both human and animal, are known.

== Treatment ==
=== Separation ===
Surgery to separate conjoined twins may range from very easy to very difficult depending on the point of attachment and the internal parts that are shared. Most cases of separation are extremely risky and life-threatening. Though there have been a number of successful separations throughout history, in many cases, the surgery results in the death of one or both of the twins, particularly if they are joined at the head or share a vital organ. This makes the ethics of surgical separation, where the twins can survive if not separated, contentious. Alice Dreger of Northwestern University found the quality of life of twins who remain conjoined to be higher than is commonly supposed. Lori and George Schappell and Abby and Brittany Hensel are notable examples.

The first recorded separation of conjoined twins took place in the Byzantine Empire in the 900s. One of the conjoined twins had already died, so the doctors of the town attempted to separate the dead twin from the surviving twin. The result was briefly successful, as the remaining twin lived for three days after separation. The next recorded case of separating conjoined twins was several centuries later, in Germany, in 1689. The first recorded successful separation of conjoined twins was performed in 1689 by Johannes Fatio. Around this same time Dr. Böhm of Gunzenhausen separated his own children, a pair of omphalopagus or xiphopagus twins; the feebler twin died four days later, but the healthier one was still alive and well at age five, when the case was reported. In 1955, neurosurgeon Harold Voris (1902-1980) and his team at Mercy Hospital in Chicago performed the first successful operation to separate craniopagus twins (conjoined at the head), which resulted in long-term survival for both. The larger girl was reported in 1963 as developing normally, but the smaller girl was permanently impaired.

In 1957, Bertram Katz and his surgical team made international medical history performing the world's first successful separation of conjoined twins sharing a vital organ. Omphalopagus twins John Nelson and James Edward Freeman (Johnny and Jimmy) were born in Youngstown, Ohio, on April 27, 1956. The boys shared a liver but had separate hearts and were successfully separated at North Side Hospital in Youngstown, Ohio, by Bertram Katz. The operation was funded by the Ohio Crippled Children's Service Society.

Other successful separations of conjoined twins include that of the separation of Ganga and Jamuna Shrestha in 2001, who were born in Kathmandu, Nepal, in 2000. The 97-hour surgery on the pair of craniopagus twins was a landmark one which took place in Singapore; the team was led by neurosurgeons Chumpon Chan and Keith Goh. The surgery left Ganga with brain damage and Jamuna unable to walk. Seven years later, Ganga Shrestha died at the Model Hospital in Kathmandu in July 2009, at the age of eight, three days after being admitted for treatment of a severe chest infection.

Infants Rose and Grace Attard, conjoined twins from Malta, were separated in the United Kingdom by court order Re A over the religious objections of their parents, Michaelangelo and Rina Attard. The twins were attached at the lower abdomen and spine. The surgery took place in November 2000, at St Mary's Hospital in Manchester. The operation was controversial because Rose, the weaker twin, would die as a result of the procedure as her heart and lungs were dependent upon Grace's. However, if the operation had not taken place, it was certain that both twins would die. Grace survived to enjoy a normal childhood.

In 2003, two 29-year-old women from Iran, Ladan and Laleh Bijani, who were joined at the head but had separate brains (craniopagus), were surgically separated in Singapore, despite surgeons' warnings that the operation could be fatal to one or both. Their complex case was accepted only because technologically advanced graphical imagery and modeling would allow the medical team to plan the risky surgery. However, an undetected major vein hidden from the scans was discovered during the operation. The separation was completed but both women died while still in surgery.

In 2019, Safa and Marwa Ullah were separated at Great Ormond Street Hospital in London, England. The twins, born January 2017, were joined at the top of the head with separate brains and a cylindrical shared skull with the twins each facing in opposite directions to one another. The surgery was jointly led by neurosurgeon Owase Jeelani and plastic surgeon Professor David Dunaway. The surgery presented particular difficulties due to a number of shared veins and a distortion in the shape of the girls' brains, causing them to overlap. The distortion would need to be corrected in order for the separation to go ahead. The surgery utilized a team of more than 100 including bio engineers, 3D modelers and a virtual reality designer. The separation was completed in February 2019 following a total of 52 hours of surgery over three separate operations. The family returned to their home in Pakistan in October 2020, though one of the twins had a stroke during surgery which could make her unable to walk for the rest of her life.

== History ==
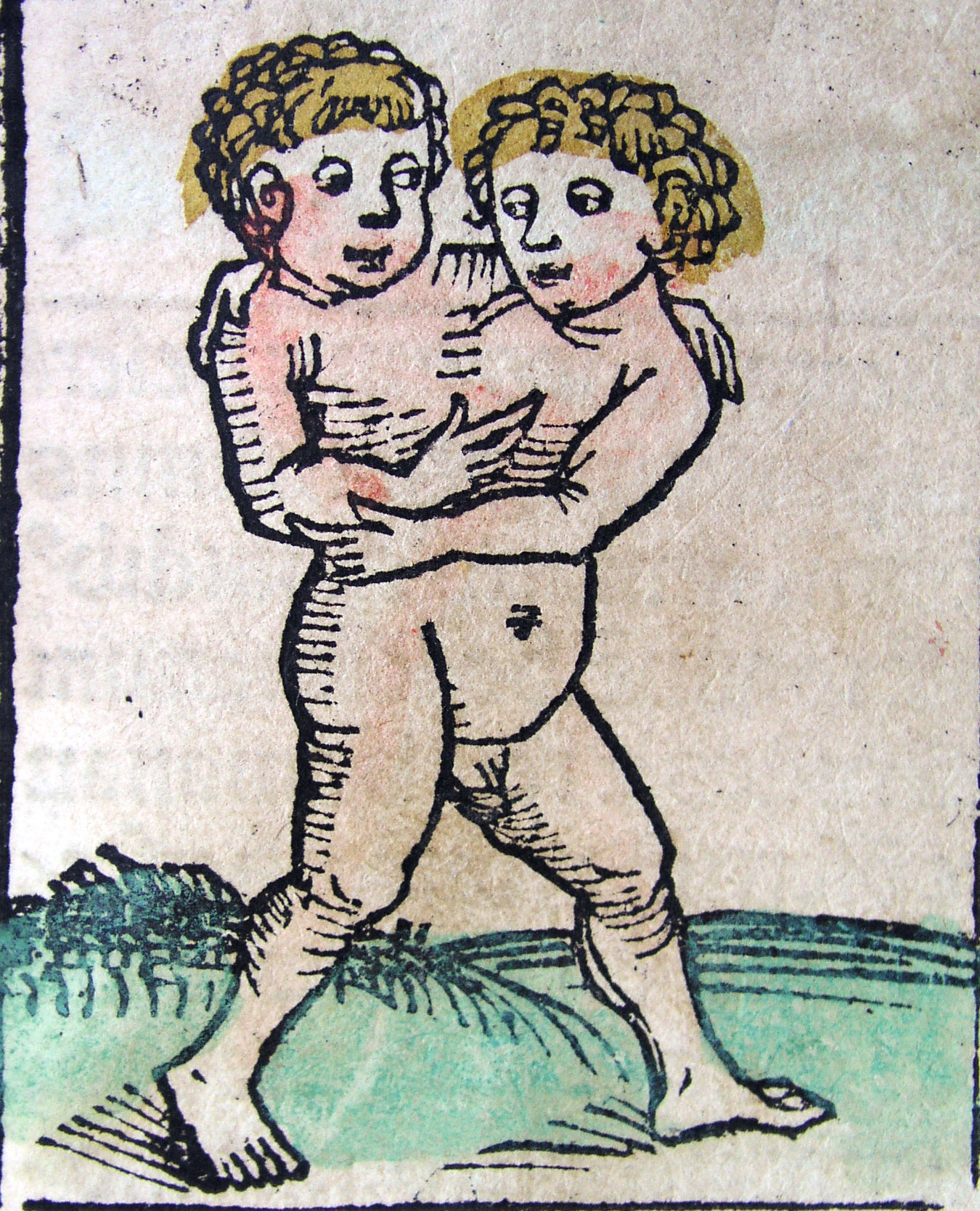
Conjoined brothers from Nuremberg Chronicle (1493)

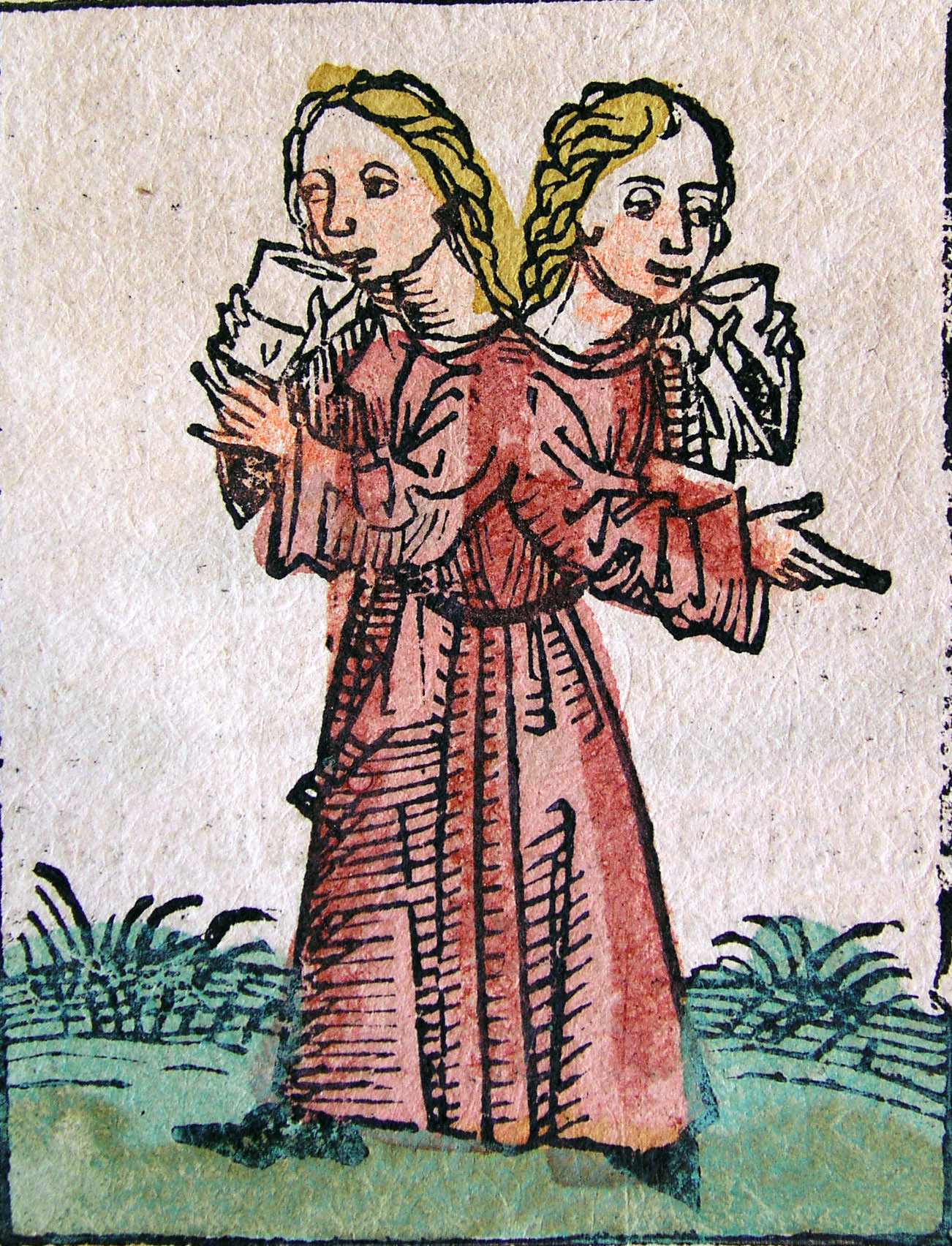
Conjoined twin sisters from Nuremberg Chronicle (1493)

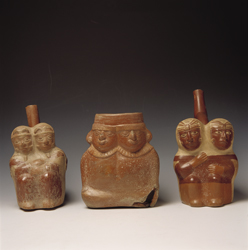
Moche ceramics depicting conjoined twins. 300 AD Larco Museum Collection Lima, Peru

The Moche culture of ancient Peru depicted conjoined twins in their ceramics dating back to 300 AD. Writing around 415 AD, St. Augustine of Hippo, in his book, City of God, refers to a man "double in his upper, but single in his lower half—having two heads, two chests, four hands, but one body and two feet like an ordinary man."

According to Theophanes the Confessor, a Byzantine historian of the 9th century, around 385/386 AD, he writes that "in the village of Emmaus in Palestine, a child was born perfectly normal below the navel but divided above it, so that it had two chests and two heads, each possessing the senses. One would eat and drink but the other did not eat; one would sleep but the other stayed awake. There were times when they played with each other, when both cried and hit each other. They lived for a little over two years. One died while the other lived for another four days and it, too, died."

In Arabia, a legend narrates that the twin brothers Hashim ibn Abd Manaf and 'Abd Shams were born with Hashim's leg attached to his twin brother's head, and that their father, Abd Manaf ibn Qusai, separated his conjoined sons with a sword and that some priests believed that the blood that had flowed between them signified wars between their progeny (confrontations did occur between Banu al'Abbas and Banu Ummaya ibn 'Abd Shams in the year 750 AH). The Muslim polymath Abū al-Rayhān al-Bīrūnī described conjoined twins in his book Kitab-al-Saidana.

In Theophanis chronographia, Theophanes described an attempted septation surgery in 945 A.D. of twins connected by the umbilicus and lower abdomen, likely describing xiphopagus twins. He wrote, "When one of the twins died, skilled doctors separated them cleverly at the line of connection with the hope of saving the surviving one but after living three days he died also." Joannes Skylitzes had a similar description in his manuscript, with illustrations on the surgery, although these illustrations were done about a century and a half after Theophanes wrote about it.

The English twin sisters Mary and Eliza Chulkhurst or Chalkhurst, commonly known as the Biddenden Maids after the village where they are believed to have lived, were conjoined at the back (pygopagus). They reputedly lived from 1100 to 1134 and were perhaps the best-known early historical example of conjoined twins. Other early conjoined twins to attain notice were the "Scottish brothers", allegedly of the dicephalus type, essentially two heads sharing the same body (1460–1488, although the dates vary); the pygopagus Helen and Judith of Szőny, Hungary (1701–1723), who enjoyed a brief career in music before being sent to live in a convent; and Rita and Cristina of Parodi of Sardinia, born in 1829. Rita and Cristina were dicephalus tetrabrachius (one body with four arms) twins and although they died at only eight months of age, they gained much attention as a curiosity when their parents exhibited them in Paris.

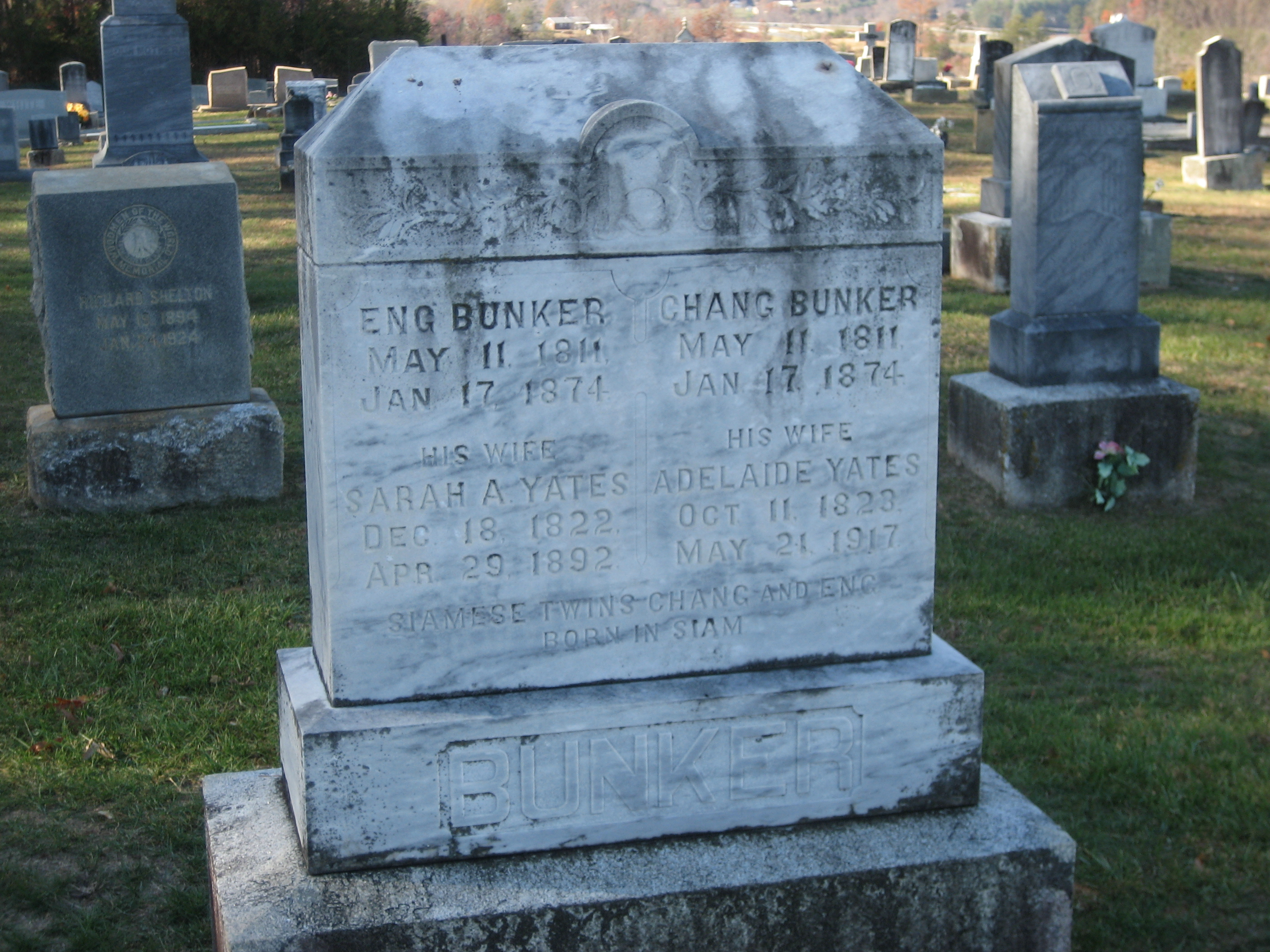
Grave of Eng and Chang Bunker near Mt. Airy, North Carolina

Several sets of conjoined twins lived during the nineteenth century and made careers for themselves in the performing arts, though none achieved quite the same level of fame and fortune as Chang and Eng. Most notably, Millie and Christine McCoy (or McKoy), pygopagus twins, were born into slavery in North Carolina in 1851. They were sold to showman J.P. Smith at birth, but were soon kidnapped by a rival showman. The kidnapper fled to England but was thwarted because England had already banned slavery. Smith traveled to England to collect the girls and brought with him their mother, Monimia, from whom they had been separated. He and his wife provided the twins with an education and taught them to speak five languages, play music, and sing. For the rest of the century, the twins enjoyed a successful career as "The Two-Headed Nightingale" and appeared with the Barnum Circus. In 1912, they died of tuberculosis, 17 hours apart.

Giacomo and Giovanni Battista Tocci, from Locana, Italy, were immortalized in Mark Twain's short story "Those Extraordinary Twins" as fictitious twins Angelo and Luigi. The Toccis, born between 1875 and 1877, were dicephalus tetrabrachius twins, having one body with two legs, two heads, and four arms. From birth they were forced by their parents to perform and never learned to walk, as each twin controlled one leg (in modern times, physical therapy allows twins like the Toccis to learn to walk on their own). They are said to have disliked show business. In 1886, after touring the United States, the twins returned to Europe with their family. Reports confirm that they were alive and married in 1904, but subsequent reports are contradictory about whether they were alive or whether they had children. They retired in Italy.

== Notable people ==
=== Born 19th century and earlier ===
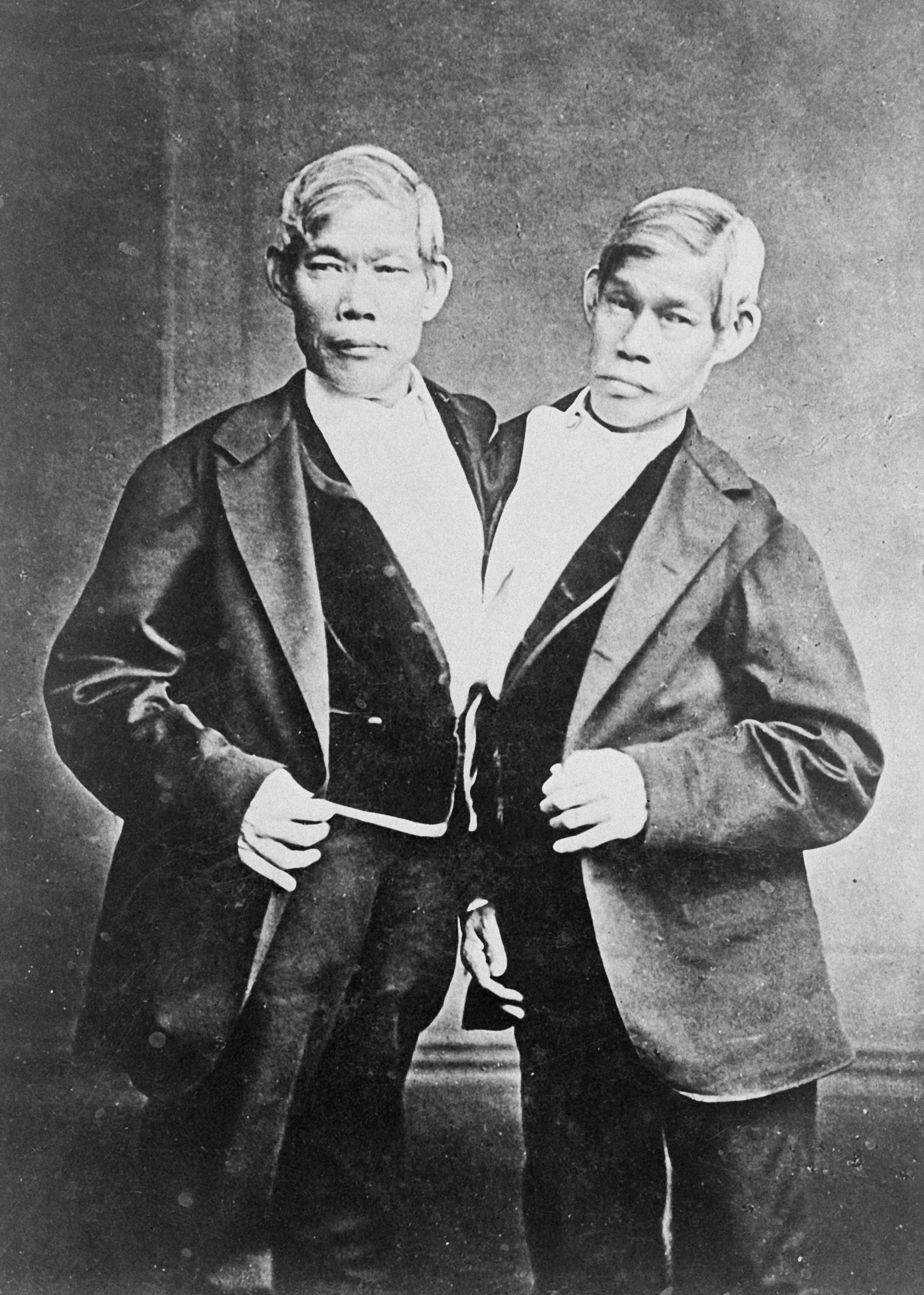
Eng (left) and Chang (right) in later years

- Mary and Eliza Chulkhurst, alleged names of the Biddenden Maids (per tradition, born in the 12th century) of Kent, England. They are the earliest set of conjoined twins whose names are (purportedly) known.
- Lazarus and Joannes Baptista Colloredo (1617 – after 1646), autosite-and-parasite pair
- Giacomo (James) and Matteo (Matthew) Poro (Genoa, 1686-?), heteropagus
- Helen and Judith of Szony (Hungary, 1701–1723), pygopagus
- Chang and Eng Bunker (1811–1874). The Bunker twins were born of Chinese origin in Siam (now Thailand), and the expression Siamese twins is derived from their case. They were joined by the areas around their xiphoid cartilages, but over time, the connective tissue stretched.
- In 1834, a set of conjoined triplets were born in Catania. Two of the heads shared a neck while the other head had its own. The infant, a male, was described by Galvagni.
- Millie and Christine McCoy (July 11, 1851 – October 8, 1912), (oblique pygopagus). The McCoy twins were born into slavery in Columbus County, North Carolina, United States. They went by the stage names "The Two-Headed Nightingale" and "The Eighth Wonder of the World" and had an extensive career before retiring to the farm on which they were born.
- Giacomo and Giovanni Battista Tocci (1877 — 1894), (dicephalus tetrabrachius dipus)
- Josefa and Rosa Blazek (January 20, 1878 — March 30, 1922), pygopagus. The Blazek twins were born in Skrejšov, Bohemia (now the Czech Republic). They began performing in public exhibitions at the age of 13, and their act later included Rosa's son Franz. The sisters died in Chicago, Illinois.

=== Born 20th century ===
- Daisy and Violet Hilton of Brighton, England (1908–1969), pygopagus. The Hilton twins were performers who played musical instruments, sang, and danced. At the height of their career, they had the highest paid act in vaudeville. They also appeared in the movies Freaks and Chained for Life.
- Lucio and Simplicio Godina of Samar, Philippines (1908–1936)
- Mary and Margaret Gibb of Holyoke, Massachusetts (1912–1967)
- Masha and Dasha Krivoshlyapova of Moscow, Russia (1950–2003), the rarest form of conjoined twins, one of few cases of dicephalus tetrabrachius tripus (two heads, four arms, three legs)
- Ronnie and Donnie Galyon of Ohio (1951–2020), omphalopagus; longest-lived conjoined twins in the world at 68 years and 250 days.
- Tjitske and Folkje de Vries of Mûnein, Netherlands (b. 1953), successfully separated in 1954
- Wariboko and Tamunotonye Davies, born July 25, 1953, in Kano, Nigeria. Separated in London by a team led by Ian Aird. Tamunotonye died postoperatively. Wariboko became a nurse.
- Lillian and Linda Matthews, born in Indianola, Mississippi, on September 14, 1955. They were conjoined from sternum to navel and were separated at five weeks old, making them one of the world's first successfully separated sets of conjoined twins. Both women graduated from Mississippi Valley State University and work as teachers.
- Lori and George Schappell of Reading, Pennsylvania (1961–2024), American entertainers, craniopagus. At the time of their death, they were the world's oldest living conjoined twins. Guinness World Records noted that George's gender transition made him and Lori the first same-sex conjoined twins to identify as different genders.
- Ganga and Jamuna Mondal of India, born 1969 or 1970, known professionally as The Spider Girls and The Spider Sisters. Ischiopagus.
- Anna and Barbara Rozycki (born 1970), the first conjoined twins successfully separated in the UK.
- Elisa and Lisa Hansen, Ogden, Utah (1977). Born by Caesarean section on October 18, 1977, were conjoined at the top of their head (craniopagus). They were separated 1979 after 16-hour surgery, were first to both survive surgery. Elisa lost the use of her right side after the surgery, but went on to complete school, win medals in the Special Olympics, work, and act in the theatre. Elisa and Lisa died in 2020 (age 42).
- Ladan and Laleh Bijani of Shiraz, Iran (1974–2003); died during separation surgery in Singapore. Craniopagus.
- Chang Chung-jen and Chung-i, born on December 23, 1976 in Taiwan, and separated in 1979. Both babies survived. It was the first successful separation in Taiwan, and the fourth in the world. Chang Chung-jen died in 2019 and Chang Chung-i is still alive.
- Baby Girl A and Baby Girl B (born 1977 in New Jersey) shared a single six-chambered heart. Separation surgery would result in the certain death of Baby Girl A, while offering a remote chance of survival for Baby Girl B. The difficult ethical and religious concerns generated significant local newspaper coverage, as without the surgery, both twins faced certain death. C. Everett Koop, who had already performed two successful separation surgeries in the past, held lengthy discussions with the family and their team of rabbinical advisors. At the family's request, and after obtaining a court order protecting him from any possible criminal liability, Koop agreed to lead the surgery; Koop did not seek civil indemnification for himself beforehand. Baby Girl B survived for three months, before infections led to liver failure, resulting in her death.
- Viet and Duc Nguyen, born on February 25, 1981, in Kon Tum Province, Vietnam, and separated in 1988 in Ho Chi Minh City. Viet died on October 6, 2007. Duc is still alive to this day.
- Maria and Consolata Mwakikuti of Tanzania (1996–2018); conjoined by the abdomen; died of respiratory problems resulting from an abnormal, inoperable chest deformity.
- Patrick and Benjamin Binder, separated in 1987 by team of doctors led by Ben Carson. Craniopagus.
- Andrew and Alex Olson, born in 1987, separated in April 1988 at the University of Nebraska Medical Center. Omphalopagus. Alex died in 2018.
- Katie and Eilish Holton, born August 1988 in Ireland, separated at age 3 and a half. Katie died 4 days after the separation surgery due to a weak heart which went into cardiac arrest.
- Abigail and Brittany Hensel are dicephalic parapagus twins born on March 7, 1990, in Carver County, Minnesota. Both graduated in 2012 from Bethel University, St. Paul, hired as teachers.
- Ashley and Ashil Fokeer, born on November 2, 1992, in Mauritius
- Joseph and Luka Banda (born January 23, 1997, in Zambia), separated in 1997 in South Africa by Ben Carson (with a later intervention in 2001 to artificially close their skulls). Craniopagus.
- José Armando and José Luis Cevallos Herrera were born in September 1999 in Milagro, Ecuador. They were accepted in 2021 to the State University of Milagro. The twins died on October 15, 2026, after one of them suffered a heart attack.

=== Born 2000s ===
- Maria del Carmen (Carmen) and Maria Guadalupe (Lupita) Andrade Solis were born in June 2000 in Veracruz, Mexico. They later moved to the United States for healthcare with their parents.
- Maria de Jesus (Josie) and Maria Teresa (Teresita) Alvarez, born joined at the skull as craniopagus twins in Guatemala in 2001, were brought to UCLA Medical Center by Medical Kids International in 2002 and successfully separated.
- Sheneeva and Chenelva Kolestein, born in Suriname in 2001 and living in the Netherlands. They are joined at the head and share vital arteries that make separation impossible.
- Mackenzie and Macey Garrison, born in December 2002 and successfully separated at Children's Hospital Los Angeles in 2003. They were conjoined at the pelvis and are part of a set of triplets; their sister Madeline is unaffected.
- Carl and Clarence Aguirre, born with vertical craniopagus in Silay City, Negros Occidental, on April 21, 2002. They were successfully separated on August 4, 2004.
- Tabea and Lea Block, from Lemgo, Germany, were born as craniopagus twins joined on the tops of their heads on August 9, 2003. The girls shared some major veins, but their brains were separate. They were separated on September 16, 2004, although Tabea died about ninety minutes later.
- Sohna and Mohna Singh from Amritsar, India. They were born in New Delhi in 2003 and given up at two months of age to be raised at Pingalwara. They have two hearts, kidneys and spinal cords while sharing a liver, gall bladder, and legs. As of 2022, they work as electricians for the Punjab State Power Corporation. They are variously described as being paid one or two salaries. When they reached voting age, the Election Commission of India supplied special goggles so that they could each maintain ballot secrecy.
- Anastasia and Tatiana Dogaru, born outside Rome, Italy, on January 13, 2004. As craniopagus twins, the top of Tatiana's head is attached to the back of Anastasia's head.
- Erin and Jade Buckles were born in February 2004. They were joined from their chests to their abdomens and shared a liver. They were successfully separated at four months old, though it resulted in Erin's paralysis from the chest down due to a spinal stroke during surgery.
- Lakshmi Tatma (born 2005) was an ischiopagus conjoined twin born in Araria district in the state of Bihar, India. She had four arms and four legs, resulting from a joining at the pelvis with a headless undeveloped parasitic twin.
- In 2005, a set of conjoined triplets was detected, characterized as tricephalus, tetrabrachius, and tetrapus parapagothoracopagus, and the pregnancy interrupted at 22 weeks.
- Kendra and Maliyah Herrin, ischiopagus twins separated in 2006 at age 4
- Krista and Tatiana Hogan, Canadian twins conjoined at the head. Born October 25, 2006. Share part of their brain and can pass sensory information and thoughts between each other.
- Trishna and Krishna from Bangladesh were born in December 2006. They are craniopagus twins, joined on the tops of their skulls and sharing a small amount of brain tissue. In 2009, they were separated in Melbourne, Australia.
- Angelica and Angelina Sabuco, born in the Philippines in 2009. Conjoined at the sternum, pericardium and liver. Successfully separated at Lucile Packard Children's Hospital on November 1, 2011 and now living in San Jose, California.

=== Born 2010s ===
- Maria and Teresa Tapia, born in the Dominican Republic on April 8, 2010. Conjoined by the liver, pancreas, and a small portion of their small intestine. Separation occurred on November 7, 2011, at Children's Hospital of Richmond at VCU.
- Amelia and Allison Tucker were born March 1, 2012 and remained in hospital at Children's Hospital of Philadelphia until their separation on November 7, 2012 at 8 months old. Born joined at the chest and abdomen, the twins shared a chest wall, liver, and diaphragm.
- Zheng Hanwei and Zheng Hanjing, born in China on August 11, 2013. Conjoined by their sternum, pericardium, and liver. In 2014, they were separated in Shanghai, China, at the Shanghai Children's Medical Center.
- Knatalye Hope and Adeline Faith Mata, born in Houston, Texas on April 11, 2014. They were conjoined at the chest and shared many internal organs, including their lungs and pericardium. They were successfully separated at Texas Children's Hospital on February 17, 2015.
- Scarlett and Ximena Torres, born in Corpus Christi, Texas on May 16, 2015. Conjoined at the hips and shared a colon and bladders. They are part of a set of identical triplets; their sister Catalina was not impacted. They were successfully separated at Driscoll Children's Hospital in 2016.
- Jadon and Anias McDonald, born in September 2015. Conjoined by the head. Successfully separated at Children's Hospital of Montefiore Medical Center by James T. Goodrich in October 2016. Anais had developmental delays following separation, while Jadon's development was less impacted.
- Erin and Abby Delaney, born in Philadelphia, Pennsylvania, on July 24, 2016, conjoined by the head. The twins shared a skull, skin and superior sagittal sinus. They were successfully separated at Children's Hospital of Philadelphia on June 16, 2017. Both twins have experienced delays in development following separation
- Anna and Hope Richards were born December 29, 2016, at Texas Children’s, conjoined at their chest and abdomen, sharing a chest wall, pericardial sac, diaphragm, liver, and a large blood vessel connecting their hearts. They were separated on January 13, 2017.
- Marieme and Ndeye Ndiaye, twin girls born in Senegal in May 2016, living in Cardiff, UK in 2019. The twins share one pelvis and one pair of legs. After consultation with Great Ormond Street Hospital, it was determined both girls would not survive a separation, and parents have elected not to separate.
- Callie and Carter Torres, born January 30, 2017, in Houston Texas, from Blackfoot Idaho. They are omphalo-ischiopagus conjoined twins, attached by their pelvic area and sharing all organs from the belly button down with just one leg each. Their parents have elected not to pursue separation surgery due to risks involved.
- Yiğit and Derman Evrensel, twin boys born on June 21, 2018, Antalya, Turkey. They are craniopagus twins and were separated at Great Ormond Street Hospital in 2019 by the same surgeons that separated Safa and Marwa Bibi.
- Ervina and Prefina Bangalo, born June 29, 2018, in the Central African Republic. They were separated on June 5, 2020, at the Bambino Gesù Pediatric Hospital in Rome, Italy.
- Mercy and Goodness Ede, born August 13, 2019, conjoined by the chest and abdomen. Successfully separated at the National Hospital in Abuja, Nigeria in November 2019.
- Hassanatu "Maggie" and Hussainatu "Chelsea" Jolloh, born in Sierra Leone on September 11, 2019. Conjoined at the chest and had a fused pericardium and liver. Their triplet brother, Chernor, died shortly after birth. They were successfully separated at the Morgan Stanley Children's Hospital in New York City on February 21, 2020.
- Marie-Cléa and Marie-Cléanne Papillon, born in Mauritius in 2019. Conjoined from neck to abdomen, but also at the heart, which had seven chambers, instead of four. Marie-Cléa did not survive the surgery to separate the two.
- Valentina and Kristina, born in 2019 in Croatia, shared a part of the digestive system and liver (xypho-omphalopagus). Several months after birth they developed twin-to-twin transfusion syndrome due to blood shunting, and they were successfully separated at University Hospital Centre Zagreb (Rebro) in an urgent procedure.
- Sarabeth and Amelia Irwin were born June 11, 2019, sharing a chest wall, sternum, pericardium and liver. They were separated at Mott Children's Hospital on August 5, 2020.
- Remi and Reese Erickson were born in Minnesota in November 2019. They shared a chest wall, abdomen, liver, part of the pelvis, and umbilical cord. They were separated at Children's Minnesota on April 9, 2020. Reese has lasting medical and developmental disabilities; Remi has developed typically.
- Abigail and Micaela Bachinskiy, born December 30, 2019 in Sacramento, California and conjoined at the head. They were successfully separated in October 2020 in a surgery that lasted over 24 hours.

=== Born 2020s ===
- Lily and Addy Altobelli, born in Philadelphia, Pennsylvania on November 18, 2020. Conjoined at the liver and diaphragm. Separated at Children's Hospital of Philadelphia on October 13, 2021.
- Susannah and Elizabeth Castle, born April 22, 2021, and separated December 10, 2021, in Philadelphia, Pennsylvania. They shared a liver, part of their digestive tract and small intestines.
- Lucas and Mateo Villalobos Barrera were born on January 18, 2022, connected at the lower abdomen and pelvis and sharing small intestines and a single colon (ischiopagus). The boys were successfully separated on August 17, 2022 at Texas Children's Hospital.
- Annabelle and Isabelle Bateson, who are from Ireland, were born March 2022 in London, joined at the chest to pelvis and sharing a liver, bladder, and bowel. The girls were born with two normal legs and a third fused leg that was removed during separation. Following their birth, they underwent successful separation surgery in September 2022 at Great Ormond Street Hospital.
- AmieLynn Rose and JamieLynn Rae Finley, born October 3, 2022, and separated January 23, 2023, in Fort Worth, Texas. They were the first conjoined twins to be separated at Cook Children's Medical Center. They were joined at the abdomen and shared a liver.
- Ella and Eliza Fuller were born at Texas Children’s on March 1, 2023 and were conjoined at the abdomen, sharing a liver. The sisters were surgically separated on June 14, 2023.
- Amelia and Elhora Dell were born on February 29, 2024. The girls shared a single heart. The girls survived for an hour following their birth.
- Amari and Javar Ruffin were born on September 29, 2023, weighing three pounds (about 1.5 lbs. each), sharing their sternum, diaphragm, abdominal wall, and liver. They spent 10 months at the Children's Hospital of Philadelphia before being successfully separated on August 21, 2024.

== In fiction ==
Conjoined twins have been the focus of several works of fiction, including:

- Robert A. Heinlein's Orphans of the Sky features Joe-Jim Gregory, the two-headed leader of a powerful mutie gang, who understands the Ship's nature better than anyone else onboard.
- Lori Lansens's second novel The Girls (2005) is the life story of craniopagus twin sisters.
- Irish author Sarah Crossan's verse novel One follows the life and survival of conjoined twin sisters. It won the Carnegie Medal, The Bookseller's 2016 prize for young adult fiction, and the Irish Children's Book of the Year.
- Lidija Dimkovska's A Spare Life (Резервен живот), 2012, translated into English by Christina E. Kramer, Two Lines Press, San Francisco, USA, 2016, tells of two conjoined sisters growing up in Macedonia just before the breakup of Yugoslavia.
- The first-person psychological survival horror game, The Outlast Trials (2024), received a major update on July 15, 2025, under the name of Project Diarchy, featuring a new set of antagonists, conjoined fraternal twin brother and sister, Otto and Arora Kress.
- In the multiplayer asymmetrical horror game Identity V, Ivy (also known as "The Shadow"), one of the playable characters, is a surgically separated conjoined twin.
- In the Warhammer franchise by Games Workshop, Kairos Fateweaver (Also known as the "Oracle of Tzeentch") is a Lord of Change, represented by an anthropomorphic raven with two heads as a result of being thrown into the Well of Eternity. The left head can see all possible futures, and the right the unbiased past, but are both blind to the immediate present.
- Katherine Dunn's novel Geek Love features conjoined twin sisters named Electra and Iphigenia, described as such by their younger sister, the book's protagonist, Olympia: "The girls were Siamese twins with perfect upper bodies joined at the waist and sharing one set of hips and legs. They usually sat and walked and slept with their long arms around each other. They were, however, able to face directly forward by allowing the shoulder of one to overlap the other... If you pulled Elly's hair, Iphy yelped too. If you kissed Iphy's cheek, Elly smiled."

== See also ==
- Medical law
- Monoamniotic twins
- Polycephaly
