= Giacomo and Giovanni Battista Tocci =

Italian conjoined twins

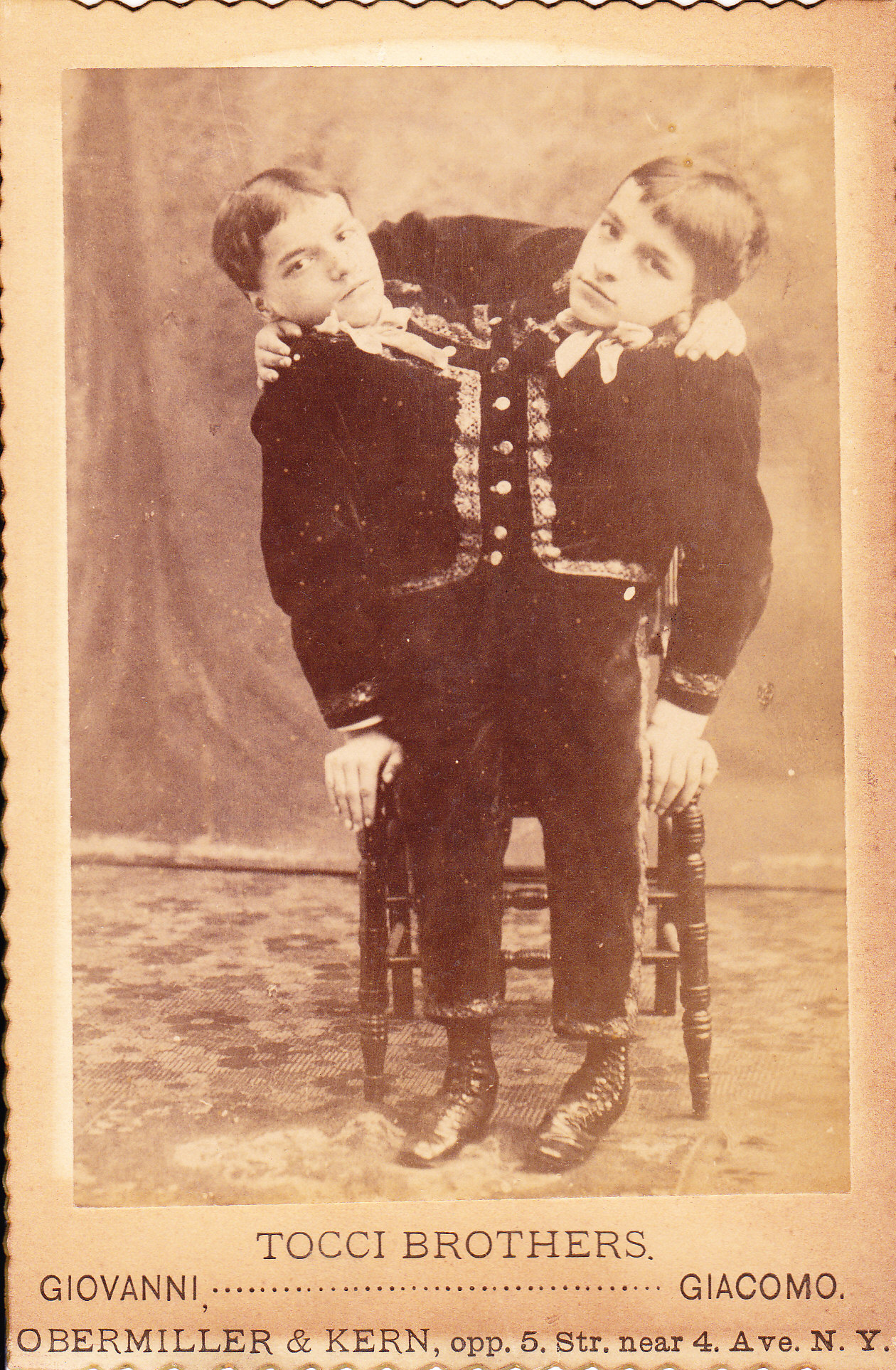
Giacomo and Giovanni Battista Tocci

Giacomo and Giovanni Battista Tocci (4 October 1877 – 13 December 1894) were conjoined twins born in Locana, Italy, notable as being of the dicephalic parapagus tetrabrachius subtype, thus having one merged trunk, four arms, and two heads. The Toccis toured in a circus with details of their later life erroneously reported well after their death in 1894.

== Birth ==
Their mother, Maria Luigia Mezzano-Rosa, was 19 years old, and was reported to have had an easy time with the birth as they were rather small. They were delivered normally, with the right head appearing first, the left head and torso second, and the pelvis and legs third; said right head was named "Giovanni Battista" and the left "Giacomo". They had one umbilical cord and one placenta, as is typical for conjoined twins of their type. Their father, Giovanni Tocci, had a breakdown due to the appearance of his eldest sons and was put into a lunatic asylum until he recovered a month later.

== Early childhood ==
The twins' parents did not allow any thorough examination of them as they believed it would diminish their fame. The twins' father took them to Turin to be exhibited in the freak show, where the twins were examined by professors of the Turin Academy of Medicine, who determined they would not live long. However, a Paris tour followed, and they were examined by two doctors in Lyon, France, who determined the Toccis would survive, against the prediction of the Italian professors. In August 1879, the twins were shown before the Swiss Society of Natural Science, where a doctor there also determined they were likely to live.

The twins had two heads, two necks, two ribcages that came together at the sixth rib, four arms, and two legs; they had two hearts, two stomachs, two sets of lungs, two separate diaphragms, and shared a large and small intestine. Each twin controlled his respective leg and did not feel his twin's body. For the rest of the 1880s, they were exhibited in most of the major cities in Italy, Switzerland, Germany, Austria, Poland, and France almost every day. Although an English doctor would later state that Giacomo was idiotic and Giovanni intelligent and artistic, every succeeding doctor stated they were both clever. They never learned to walk as they did not have muscular development in their legs due to almost all of their time being exhibited, as it made it easier for their parents to exploit them. Despite this, they could stand by using a chair or another object to balance. To get around, they tumbled about on all six limbs or were transported in a wheelchair.

== Adolescence ==
The twins spoke Italian, French, and German. They settled disputes between themselves with their fists. While Giovanni liked beer, Giacomo preferred mineral water, and Giacomo was very talkative while Giovanni was more quiet. In 1891, the boys did go to the United States for an extensive tour and were paid $1,000 a week (equivalent to $36,000 in 2025). In March 1892, they arrived in New York City and stayed for three weeks. Their one-year tour turned into a five-year tour as their popularity grew in the United States.

Their father and stepmother had returned to Italy with their children by 1894, locating at Vesignano, a hamlet near Rivarolo Canavese, where the Toccis died on 16 December at the age of 17.

== Speculation ==
Given the family's desire for privacy following the twins' exhibition, information on the twins became scant, leading to speculation in various publications. One such story posited that the twins decided to retire in Italy, buying a villa in Venice and becoming recluses, never leaving the high-walled villa, their experiences in the freak show making them wary of any sort of exhibition. It was reported in 1900 that they were alive and well and in 1904 that the brothers had married two women, with legal speculation following. Later reports continued to contradict one another. One, in 1906, claimed the brothers had died, while a 1911 report confirmed they were still alive. Later, a report in 1934 seemed to support this last by stating that in 1912 the twins had still been alive, and had even had children of their own—‌and yet, another report claimed the brothers had died, childless, in 1940.

== Mark Twain and "Those Extraordinary Twins" ==
When the twins went on their American tour, author Mark Twain saw a photograph of "A youthful Italian freak" and decided to write the short story "Those Extraordinary Twins" (1892), which later became the novel Pudd'nhead Wilson (1894).

== See also ==
Media related to Giacomo and Giovanni Battista Tocci at Wikimedia Commons

== Notes ==
- Bondeson, Jan (2000). The Two Headed Boy and Other Medical Marvels.
- Bondeson, Jan (2001). "Dicephalus Conjoined Twins: A Historical Review With Emphasis on Viability". Journal of Pediatric Surgery. 36 (9, September 2001): 1435–1444. doi:10.1053/jpsu.2001.26393. PMID 11528623.
- https://web.archive.org/web/20141116061958/http://www.phreeque.com/tocci_brothers.html
- http://etext.virginia.edu/railton/wilson/toccitwn.html
- https://web.archive.org/web/20100204084017/http://www.quasi-modo.net/Tocci2.html
- http://thehumanmarvels.com/?p=71
- https://lasentinella.gelocal.it/tempo-libero/2020/10/28/news/i-fratelli-tocci-gemelli-siamesi-canavesani-vittime-del-cinismo-di-fine-ottocento-1.39468571
- Hartzman, Marc (2006). American Sideshow.
- Mannix, Daniel P. (1976). Freaks: We Who Are Not As Others.
- Gould, George M.; Pyle, Walter L. (1896). Anomalies and Curiosities of Medicine.
- Twain, Mark (1892). Pudd'nhead Wilson and Those Extraordinary Twins.
