= Ischiopagi =

Conjoined twins fused at the pelvis

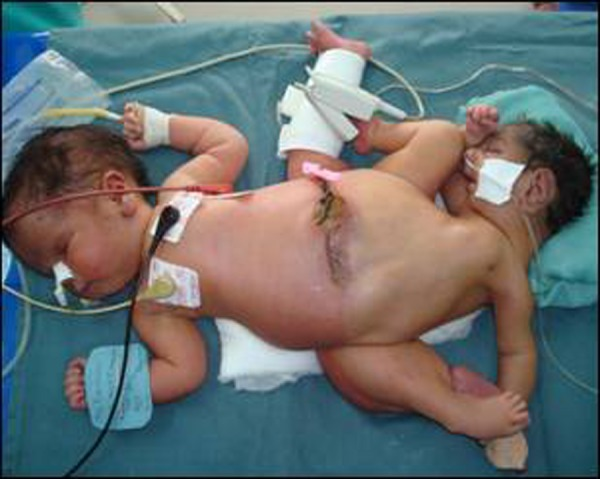
Ischiopagus Tripus conjoined twins who died in a hospital pre-surgery in 2011

Ischiopagi comes from the Greek word ischio- meaning hip (ilium) and -pagus meaning fixed or united. It is the medical term used for conjoined twins (Class V) who are united at the pelvis. The twins are classically joined with the vertebral axis at 180°. The conjoined twins usually have four arms; two, three or four legs; and typically one external genitalia and anus.

It is mostly confused with pygopagus where the twins are joined dorsally at the buttocks facing away from each other, whereas ischiopagus twins are joined ventrally and caudally at the sacrum and coccyx. Parapagus is also similar to ischiopagus; however, parapagus twins are joined side-by-side whereas ischiopagus twins typically have spines connected at a 180° angle, facing away from one another.

== Classification ==
Ischiopagus dipus
This is the rarest variety with the twins sharing two legs with no lower extremities on one side.
Ischiopagus tripus
These twins share three legs, the third leg is often two fused legs, or is non-functioning. The twins also usually share only one set of external genitalia.
Ischiopagus tetrapus/quadripus
This variety has the twins at a symmetrical continuous longitudinal axis with their area of union not broken anteriorly. The axes extends in a straight line but in opposite directions. The lower extremities are oriented at right angles to the axes of the thorax and the adjacent limbs near the union of the ischium belong to the opposite twin.

== Embryology ==
During embryonic development, twins can form from the splitting of a single embryo (monozygotic) which forms identical twins or the twins can arise from separate oocytes in the same menstrual cycle (dizygotic) which forms fraternal twins. Although the latter is more frequent, monozygotic is the reason conjoined twins can develop. In monozygotic twinning for conjoined twins such as ischiopagi, the twins form by the splitting of a bi-laminar embryonic disc after the formation of the inner cell masses. Thus, making the twins occupy the same amnion which can lead to a conjoining of the twins as a result of the twins not separating properly during the twinning process. Separation occurring between the seventh and thirteenth days should result in a monochorionic, monoamniotic identical twins sharing a yolk sac.

If separation of the twins occur in the later stages of development prior to the appearance of the primitive streak and axial orientation, then it can be predicted that conjoined twins will develop. The origin of exactly what goes wrong to produce ischiopagus or any conjoined twin is a result by either incomplete fission or double overlapping inducing centers on the same germ disc. Various studies suggest that mechanical disturbances such as shaking of the blastomeres, exposure of the embryo to cold or insufficient oxygen during the early process of cleavage, grafting organizer onto gastrula or half a gastrula together, or constricting the blastula or early gastrula can cause the incomplete separation of monozygotic twins. However, studies have shown that these disturbances must happen at critical times in the pregnancy for the conjoined twins to develop.

== Complications ==
Conjoined twins are at high risk to being stillborn or dying shortly after birth. In some cases, a healthy twin and a parasitic twin are born. The parasitic twin has no hope for survival and dies and is then surgically separated from its twin. Depending upon how the twins are attached and what is shared among them, complications can arise from surgically separating the live twin from the dead twin. In Ischiopagus cases, the children share a pelvic region along with the gastrointestinal tract and genital region. Ischiopagus twins need reconstructive surgery for the genitals and gastrointestinal tract in order for normal bowel movements and reproductive possibilities in adulthood.

For the Ischiopagus twins that both survive from birth, complications and risks also arise. Usually if both twins survive labor, one twin will be healthy and strong, while the other is malnourished and weak. Thus, surgery would have to be planned to understand the best option and how to keep both children alive during surgery as well as afterwards.

== Treatment ==
Separation is the only treatment for Ischiopagus. The rarity of the condition as well as the challenge it presents in separating the twins has been difficult to understand. In recent years, with advancing medical technology, physicians have been able to successfully separate Ischiopagus twins. However, it depends on the organs shared, how closely joined the twins are, and what risks could rise from separating the twins during surgery.

Since Ischiopagus twins usually share a gastrointestinal tract and other organs in the pelvic region, it takes months of planning to decide whether or not separation of the twins outweighs the complications and risks associated with surgery and reconstruction of organs. Surgery to separate conjoined twins has allowed surgeons to be able to study the mechanisms of embryogenesis as well as the physiological consequences of parabiosis.

Separating ischiopagus tripus conjoined twins usually leaves the twins with one leg each.

== Prognosis ==
Depending upon what organs are shared among the twins and if they are surgically separable, usually only one of the twins makes it through the surgery or they both die due to complications either before or during the surgery. Now that successful surgery has been reported and more findings are becoming available due to research and pre-surgery evaluation, better surgery techniques and procedures will be available in the future to help increase the survival rate of ischiopagus twins as well as other conjoined twins.

== Epidemiology ==
Ischiopagus is a rare anomaly occurring in about 1 in every 100,000 live births and occurring in 1 out of 10 conjoined twin births. Most Ischiopagus cases are common in the areas of India and Africa. Of the varieties of Ischiopagus twins, Ischiopagus Tetrapus is more prevalent, happening in 68.75% of all Ischiopagus cases. Ischiopagus Tripus occurs in 31.25% of cases while Ischiopagus Dipus occurs in only 6.25% of all Ischiopagus cases.
