= Darenjan =

Darenjan (Persian: دارنجان) may refer to:

- Darenjan, Fars
- Darenjan, Firuzabad, Fars Province
- Darenjan-e Lor, Firuzabad County, Fars Province
- Darenjan, Kerman
