= Sir Yazjan =

Sir Yazjan or Sariz Jan or Serizjan (Persian: سيريزجان) may refer to:

- Serizjan-e Namdi
- Sir Yazjan-e Galeh Zan Abu ol Hasan Beygi
- Sir Yazjan-e Galeh Zan Mazarai
- Sirizjan
