= Anar Mehr =

Anar Mehr انارمهر
- Village
- Location within Iran
- Coordinates: 29°10′52″N 52°17′18″E
- Country: Iran
- Province: Fars
- County: Firuzabad
- Bakhsh: Meymand
- Rural District: Dadenjan

Population (2006)
  - Total: 133
- Time zone: UTC+3:30 (IRST)
  - Summer (DST): UTC+4:30 (IRDT)

Anar Mehr (Persian: انارمهر, also Romanized as Anār Mehr) is a village in Dadenjan Rural District, Meymand District, Firuzabad County, Fars province, Iran. At the 2006 census, its population was 133, in 33 families.
