= Emamzadeh Ganju =

Emamzadeh Ganju امام زاده گنجو
- Village
- Location within Iran
- Coordinates: 29°02′48″N 52°16′16″E
- Country: Iran
- Province: Fars
- County: Firuzabad
- Bakhsh: Central
- Rural District: Ahmadabad

Population (2006)
  - Total: 41
- Time zone: UTC+3:30 (IRST)
  - Summer (DST): UTC+4:30 (IRDT)

Emamzadeh Ganju (Persian: امام زاده گنجو, also Romanized as Emāmzādeh Ganjū) is a village in Ahmadabad Rural District, in the Central District of Firuzabad County, Fars province, Iran. At the 2006 census, its population was 41, in 6 families.
