= Rudbal, Firuzabad =

Village in Fars province, Iran

Rudbal Persian: رودبال
- Village
- Location within Iran
- Coordinates: 28°43′11″N 52°37′11″E
- Country: Iran
- Province: Fars
- County: Firuzabad
- District: Jaydasht
- Rural District: Jaydasht

Population (2016)
  - Total: 1,222
- Time zone: UTC+3:30 (IRST)

Rudbal (Persian: رودبال) (Note: Also romanized as Rūdbāl; also known as Rūdbār) is a village in, and the capital of, Jaydasht Rural District in Jaydasht District of Firuzabad County, Fars province, Iran. The previous capital of the rural district was the village of Jaydasht.

== Demographics ==
=== Population ===
At the time of the 2006 National Census, the village's population was 1,472 in 361 households, when it was in the Central District. The following census in 2011 counted 1,508 people in 416 households. The 2016 census measured the population of the village as 1,222 people in 404 households.

In 2024, the rural district was separated from the district in the establishment of Jaydasht District.
