= Tang-e Anari =

Tang-e Anari (Saravi Presidency) تنگاناري
- Village
- Location within Iran
- Coordinates: 28°59′56″N 52°31′48″E
- Country: Iran
- Province: Fars
- County: Firuzabad
- Bakhsh: Meymand
- Rural District: Khvajehei

Population (2006)
  - Total: 19
- Time zone: UTC+3:30 (IRST)
  - Summer (DST): UTC+4:30 (IRDT)

Tang-e Anari (Persian: تنگاناري, also Romanized as Tang-e Ānārī) is a village in Khvajehei Rural District, Meymand District, Firuzabad County, Fars province, Iran. At the 2006 census, its population was 19, in 5 families.
