= Ab Dozduiyeh =

Ab Dozduiyeh اب دزدويه
- Village
- Location within Iran
- Coordinates: 28°37′23″N 52°50′39″E
- Country: Iran
- Province: Fars
- County: Firuzabad
- Bakhsh: Central
- Rural District: Jaydasht

Population (2006)
  - Total: 167
- Time zone: UTC+3:30 (IRST)
  - Summer (DST): UTC+4:30 (IRDT)

Ab Dozduiyeh (Persian: اب دزدويه, also romanized as Āb Dozdūīyeh; also known as Ābdūzak and Āb Dūzīyeh) is a village in Jaydasht Rural District, in the Central District of Firuzabad County, Fars province, Iran. At the 2006 census, its population was 167, in 36 families.
