= Ab Surakh =

Ab Surakh (Persian: اب سوراخ) may refer to:

- Ab Surakh, Fars
- Ab Surakh, Dezful, Khuzestan Province
- Ab Surakh, Izeh, Khuzestan Province
