= Fathabad-e Deh-e Arab =

Fathabad-e Deh-e Arab فتح ابادده عرب
- Village
- Location within Iran
- Coordinates: 28°41′29″N 52°40′03″E
- Country: Iran
- Province: Fars
- County: Firuzabad
- Bakhsh: Central
- Rural District: Jaydasht

Population (2006)
  - Total: 290
- Time zone: UTC+3:30 (IRST)
  - Summer (DST): UTC+4:30 (IRDT)

Fathabad-e Deh-e Arab (Persian: فتح ابادده عرب, also Romanized as Fatḩābād-e Deh-e 'Arab; also known as 'Arab, 'Arab Fatḩābād, and Fatḩābād-e 'Arab) is a village in Jaydasht Rural District, in the Central District of Firuzabad County, Fars province, Iran. At the 2006 census, its population was 290, in 72 families.
