= Shahrak-e Zanjiran =

Shahrak-e Zanjiran شهرك زنجيران
- Village
- Location within Iran
- Coordinates: 29°03′25″N 52°37′16″E
- Country: Iran
- Province: Fars
- County: Firuzabad
- Bakhsh: Meymand
- Rural District: Khvajehei

Population (2006)
  - Total: 747
- Time zone: UTC+3:30 (IRST)
  - Summer (DST): UTC+4:30 (IRDT)

Shahrak-e Zanjiran (Persian: شهرك زنجيران, also Romanized as Shahrak-e Zanjīrān; also known as Qal‘eh Zanjiran and Zanjīrān) is a village in Khvajehei Rural District, Meymand District, Firuzabad County, Fars province, Iran. At the 2006 census, its population was 747, in 175 families.
