= Deh Rud, Fars =

Deh Rud دهرود
- Village
- Location within Iran
- Coordinates: 28°36′48″N 52°34′22″E
- Country: Iran
- Province: Fars
- County: Firuzabad
- Bakhsh: Central
- Rural District: Jaydasht

Population (2006)
  - Total: 138
- Time zone: UTC+3:30 (IRST)
  - Summer (DST): UTC+4:30 (IRDT)

Deh Rud (Persian: دهرود, also Romanized as Deh Rūd; also known as Dow Rūd) is a village in Jaydasht Rural District, in the Central District of Firuzabad County, Fars province, Iran. At the 2006 census, its population was 138, in 38 families.
