= Barg-e Tut =

Barg-e Tut برگ توت
- Village
- Location within Iran
- Coordinates: 29°01′57″N 52°30′39″E
- Country: Iran
- Province: Fars
- County: Firuzabad
- Bakhsh: Meymand
- Rural District: Khvajehei

Population (2006)
  - Total: 12
- Time zone: UTC+3:30 (IRST)
  - Summer (DST): UTC+4:30 (IRDT)

Barg-e Tut (Persian: برگ توت, also Romanized as Barg-e Tūt) is a village in Khvajehei Rural District, Meymand District, Firuzabad County, Fars province, Iran. At the 2006 census, its population was 12, in 5 families.
