= Cheshmeh Boluqu =

Cheshmeh Boluqu چشمه بلوقو
- Village
- Location within Iran
- Coordinates: 29°05′40″N 52°19′48″E
- Country: Iran
- Province: Fars
- County: Firuzabad
- Bakhsh: Meymand
- Rural District: Khvajehei

Population (2006)
  - Total: 33
- Time zone: UTC+3:30 (IRST)
  - Summer (DST): UTC+4:30 (IRDT)

Cheshmeh Boluqu (Persian: چشمه بلوقو, also Romanized as Cheshmeh Bolūqū; also known as Cheshmeh Būlūqū) is a village in Khvajehei Rural District, Meymand District, Firuzabad County, Fars province, Iran. At the 2006 census, its population was 33, in 5 families.
