= Khobreh =

Khobreh خبره
- Village
- Location within Iran
- Coordinates: 29°08′03″N 52°12′03″E
- Country: Iran
- Province: Fars
- County: Firuzabad
- Bakhsh: Meymand
- Rural District: Dadenjan

Population (2006)
  - Total: 100
- Time zone: UTC+3:30 (IRST)
  - Summer (DST): UTC+4:30 (IRDT)

Khobreh (Persian: خبره; also known as Khavreh) is a village in Dadenjan Rural District, Meymand District, Firuzabad County, Fars province, Iran. At the 2006 census, its population was 100, in 22 families.
