= Deh Barm =

Deh Barm ده برم
- Village
- Location within Iran
- Coordinates: 28°51′59″N 52°29′46″E
- Country: Iran
- Province: Fars
- County: Firuzabad
- Bakhsh: Central
- Rural District: Ahmadabad

Population (2006)
  - Total: 839
- Time zone: UTC+3:30 (IRST)
  - Summer (DST): UTC+4:30 (IRDT)

Deh Barm (Persian: ده برم) is a village in Ahmadabad Rural District, in the Central District of Firuzabad County, Fars province, Iran. At the 2006 census, its population was 839, in 170 families.
