= Kherqeh =

Kherqeh خرقه
- Village
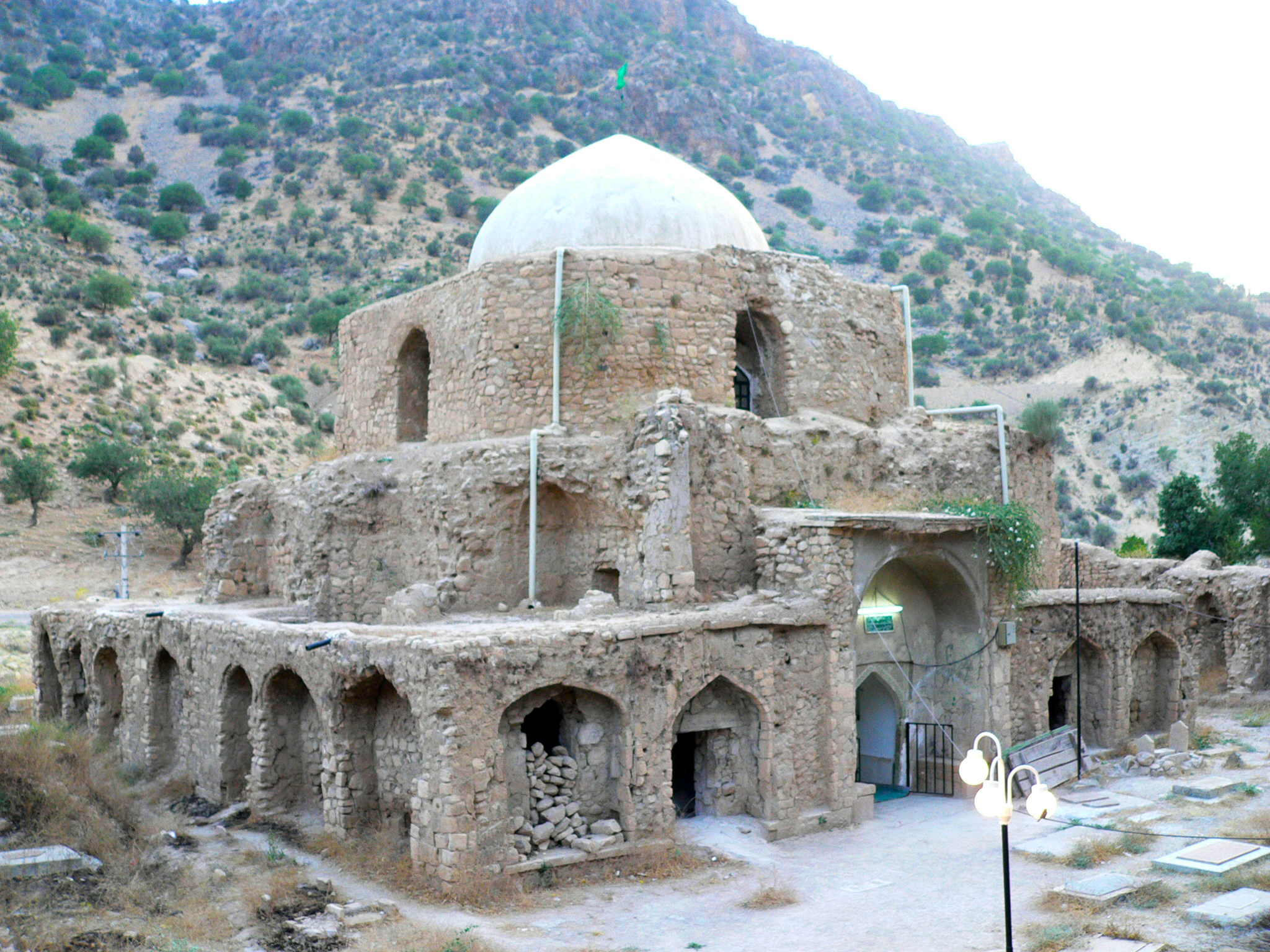

- Location within Iran
- Coordinates: 28°54′23″N 52°22′31″E
- Country: Iran
- Province: Fars
- County: Firuzabad
- Bakhsh: Central
- Rural District: [[firouzabad Rural District (Firuzabad County)|Ahmadabad]]

Population (2006)
  - Total: 102
- Time zone: UTC+3:30 (IRST)
  - Summer (DST): UTC+4:30 (IRDT)

Kherqeh (Persian: خرقه) is a village in Ahmadabad Rural District, in the Central District of Firuzabad County, Fars province, Iran. At the 2006 census, its population was 102, in 23 families.
