= Deh Bin =

Deh Bin ده بين
- Village
- Location within Iran
- Coordinates: 28°46′44″N 52°28′29″E
- Country: Iran
- Province: Fars
- County: Firuzabad
- Bakhsh: Central
- Rural District: Ahmadabad

Government

Population (2006)
  - Total: 589
- Time zone: UTC+3:30 (IRST)
  - Summer (DST): UTC+4:30 (IRDT)

Deh Bin (Persian: ده بين, also Romanized as Deh Bīn) is a village in Ahmadabad Rural District, in the Central District of Firuzabad County, Fars province, Iran. At the 2006 census, its population was 589, in 122 families.
