= Tang-e Riz =

Tang-e Riz روستای تخمی تنگریز
- Village
- Location within Iran
- Coordinates: 28°54′12″N 52°48′24″E
- Country: Iran
- Province: Fars
- County: Firuzabad
- Bakhsh: Meymand
- Rural District: Par Zeytun

Population (2006)
  - Total: 302
- Time zone: UTC+3:30 (IRST)
  - Summer (DST): UTC+4:30 (IRDT)

Tang-e Riz (Persian: تنگ ريز, also Romanized as Tang-e Rīz and Tang Rīz) is a village in Par Zeytun Rural District, Meymand District, Firuzabad County, Fars province, Iran. At the 2006 census, its population was 302, in 62 families.
