= Baneh Khafrak =

Baneh Khafrak بنه خفرك
- Village
- Location within Iran
- Coordinates: 28°59′22″N 52°39′40″E
- Country: Iran
- Province: Fars
- County: Firuzabad
- Bakhsh: Meymand
- Rural District: Khvajehei

Population (2006)
  - Total: 457
- Time zone: UTC+3:30 (IRST)
  - Summer (DST): UTC+4:30 (IRDT)

Baneh Khafrak (Persian: بنه خفرك; also known as Baneh Khafreh and Boneh Khafr) is a village in Khvajehei Rural District, Meymand District, Firuzabad County, Fars province, Iran. At the 2006 census, its population was 457, in 97 families.
