= Karimeh =

Karimeh كريمه
- Village
- Country: Iran
- Province: Fars
- County: Firuzabad
- Bakhsh: Central
- Rural District: Jaydasht

Population (2006)
  - Total: 55
- Time zone: UTC+3:30 (IRST)
  - Summer (DST): UTC+4:30 (IRDT)

Karimeh (Persian: كريمه, also Romanized as Karīmeh) is a village in Jaydasht Rural District, in the Central District of Firuzabad County, Fars province, Iran. At the 2006 census, its population was 55, in 13 families.
