= Ab Qalat =

Ab Qalat اب قلات
- Village
- Location within Iran
- Coordinates: 28°39′31″N 52°51′03″E
- Country: Iran
- Province: Fars
- County: Firuzabad
- Bakhsh: Central
- Rural District: Jaydasht

Population (2006)
  - Total: 105
- Time zone: UTC+3:30 (IRST)
  - Summer (DST): UTC+4:30 (IRDT)

Ab Qalat (Persian: اب قلات, also Romanized as Āb Qalāt and Ābqalāt) is a village in Jaydasht Rural District, in the Central District of Firuzabad County, Fars province, Iran. At the 2006 census, its population was 105, in 21 families.
