= Deh Balai Kherqeh =

Deh Balai Kherqeh ده بالاي خرقه
- Village
- Country: Iran
- Province: Fars
- County: Firuzabad
- Bakhsh: Central
- Rural District: Ahmadabad

Population (2006)
  - Total: 43
- Time zone: UTC+3:30 (IRST)
  - Summer (DST): UTC+4:30 (IRDT)

Deh Balai Kherqeh (Persian: ده بالاي خرقه, also Romanized as Deh Bālāī Kherqeh) is a village in Ahmadabad Rural District, in the Central District of Firuzabad County, Fars province, Iran. At the 2006 census, its population was 43, in 7 families.
