= Burzakan =

Burzakan بورزكان
- Village
- Location within Iran
- Coordinates: 29°08′10″N 52°32′32″E
- Country: Iran
- Province: Fars
- County: Firuzabad
- Bakhsh: Meymand
- Rural District: Khvajehei

Population (2006)
  - Total: 112
- Time zone: UTC+3:30 (IRST)
  - Summer (DST): UTC+4:30 (IRDT)

Burzakan (Persian: بورزكان, also Romanized as Būrzakān; also known as Borzakān and Borzekān) is a village in Khvajehei Rural District, Meymand District, Firuzabad County, Fars province, Iran. At the 2006 census, its population was 112, in 24 families.
