= Khani Ab =

Khani Ab خاني اب
- Village
- Location within Iran
- Coordinates: 28°36′08″N 52°35′23″E
- Country: Iran
- Province: Fars
- County: Firuzabad
- Bakhsh: Central
- Rural District: Jaydasht

Population (2006)
  - Total: 37
- Time zone: UTC+3:30 (IRST)
  - Summer (DST): UTC+4:30 (IRDT)

Khani Ab (Persian: خاني اب, also Romanized as Khānī Āb) is a village in Jaydasht Rural District, in the Central District of Firuzabad County, Fars province, Iran. At the 2006 census, its population was 37, in 14 families.
