= Giahzar =

Giahzar گياه زار
- Village
- Location within Iran
- Coordinates: 29°06′11″N 52°16′12″E
- Country: Iran
- Province: Fars
- County: Firuzabad
- Bakhsh: Meymand
- Rural District: Dadenjan

Population (2006)
  - Total: 122
- Time zone: UTC+3:30 (IRST)
  - Summer (DST): UTC+4:30 (IRDT)

Giahzar (Persian: گياه زار, also Romanized as Gīāhzār; also known as Gahzār) is a village in Dadenjan Rural District, Meymand District, Firuzabad County, Fars province, Iran. At the 2006 census, its population was 122, in 25 families.
