= Sahra Sefid =

Sahra Sefid صحراسفيد
- Village
- Location within Iran
- Coordinates: 28°50′08″N 52°47′57″E
- Country: Iran
- Province: Fars
- County: Firuzabad
- Bakhsh: Meymand
- Rural District: Par Zeytun

Population (2006)
  - Total: 325
- Time zone: UTC+3:30 (IRST)
  - Summer (DST): UTC+4:30 (IRDT)

Sahra Sefid (Persian: صحراسفيد, also Romanized as Şaḩrā Sefīd; also known as Qal‘eh-ye Şaḩrā Sefīd, Sar-i-Sefīd, and Sar Safīd) is a village in Par Zeytun Rural District, Meymand District, Firuzabad County, Fars province, Iran. At the 2006 census, its population was 325, in 73 families.
