= Lah Ab =

Lah Ab له اب
- Village
- Country: Iran
- Province: Fars
- County: Firuzabad
- Bakhsh: Meymand
- Rural District: Par Zeytun

Population (2006)
  - Total: 42
- Time zone: UTC+3:30 (IRST)
  - Summer (DST): UTC+4:30 (IRDT)

Lah Ab (Persian: له اب, also Romanized as Lah Āb) is a village in Par Zeytun Rural District, Meymand District, Firuzabad County, Fars province, Iran. At the 2006 census, its population was 42, in 10 families.
