= Ruz Badan =

Ruz Badan روزبدان
- Village
- Location within Iran
- Coordinates: 28°48′53″N 52°36′53″E
- Country: Iran
- Province: Fars
- County: Firuzabad
- Bakhsh: Central
- Rural District: Jaydasht

Population (2006)
  - Total: 744
- Time zone: UTC+3:30 (IRST)
  - Summer (DST): UTC+4:30 (IRDT)

Ruz Badan (Persian: روزبدان, also Romanized as Rūz Badān, Rūzbedān, and Rūzbodān; also known as Rūzīdān) is a village in Jaydasht Rural District, in the Central District of Firuzabad County, Fars province, Iran. At the 2006 census, its population was 744, in 153 families.
