= Murj-e Shahrak =

Murj-e Shahrak مورج شهرك
- Village
- Location within Iran
- Coordinates: 28°52′07″N 52°27′41″E
- Country: Iran
- Province: Fars
- County: Firuzabad
- Bakhsh: Central
- Rural District: Ahmadabad

Population (2006)
  - Total: 761
- Time zone: UTC+3:30 (IRST)
  - Summer (DST): UTC+4:30 (IRDT)

Murj-e Shahrak (Persian: مورج شهرك, also Romanized as Mūrj-e Shahrak; also known as Mūrch-e Shahrak and Mūrd-e Shahrak) is a village in Ahmadabad Rural District, in the Central District of Firuzabad County, Fars province, Iran. At the 2006 census, its population was 761, in 151 families.
