= Gowd Kahluyeh =

Gowd Kahluyeh گودكهلويه
- Village
- Location within Iran
- Coordinates: 28°48′58″N 52°50′08″E
- Country: Iran
- Province: Fars
- County: Firuzabad
- Bakhsh: Meymand
- Rural District: Par Zeytun

Population (2006)
  - Total: 105
- Time zone: UTC+3:30 (IRST)
  - Summer (DST): UTC+4:30 (IRDT)

Gowd Kahluyeh (Persian: گودكهلويه, also Romanized as Gowd Kahlūyeh; also known as Gowd Kahleh) is a village in Par Zeytun Rural District, Meymand District, Firuzabad County, Fars province, Iran. At the 2006 census, its population was 105, in 23 families.
