= Honifaqan =

Honifaqan حنيفقان
- Village
- Location within Iran
- Coordinates: 29°05′43″N 52°33′27″E
- Country: Iran
- Province: Fars
- County: Firuzabad
- Bakhsh: Meymand
- Rural District: Khvajehei

Population (2006)
  - Total: 113
- Time zone: UTC+3:30 (IRST)
  - Summer (DST): UTC+4:30 (IRDT)

Honifaqan (Persian: حنيفقان, also Romanized as Ḩonīfaqān and Ḩanīfqān; also known as Ḩownīfaqān and Khonīfaqān) is a village in Khvajehei Rural District, Meymand District, Firuzabad County, Fars province, Iran. At the 2006 census, its population was 113, in 34 families.
