= Eslamabad, Firuzabad =

Eslamabad اسلام آباد
- Village
- Location within Iran
- Coordinates: 28°47′14″N 52°27′44″E
- Country: Iran
- Province: Fars
- County: Firuzabad
- Bakhsh: Central
- Rural District: Ahmadabad

Population (2006)
  - Total: 522
- Time zone: UTC+3:30 (IRST)
  - Summer (DST): UTC+4:30 (IRDT)

Eslamabad (Persian: اسلام آباد, also Romanized as Eslāmābād; also known as Dowlatābād, Dowlatābād-e Yaḩyáābād, Dowlatābād-e Yaḩyaābād, and Dowlat Abad Hoomeh) is a village in Ahmadabad Rural District, in the Central District of Firuzabad County, Fars province, Iran. At the 2006 census, its population was 522, in 126 families.
