= Shahrak-e Shahid Dastgheyb, Fars =

Village in Fars province, Iran

Shahrak-e Shahid Dastgheyb Persian: شهرك شهيددستغيب
- Village
- Location within Iran
- Coordinates: 28°42′45″N 52°42′04″E
- Country: Iran
- Province: Fars
- County: Firuzabad
- District: Jaydasht
- Rural District: Hayqor

Population (2016)
  - Total: 957
- Time zone: UTC+3:30 (IRST)

Shahrak-e Shahid Dastgheyb (Persian: شهرك شهيددستغيب) (Note: Also romanized as Shahrak-e Shahīd Dastgheyb; also known as Shahrak-e Dastgheyb) is a village in, and the capital of, Hayqor Rural District in Jaydasht District of Firuzabad County, Fars province, Iran.

== Demographics ==
=== Population ===
At the time of the 2006 National Census, the village's population was 883 in 188 households, when it was in Jaydasht Rural District of the Central District. The following census in 2011 counted 972 people in 238 households. The 2016 census measured the population of the village as 957 people in 248 households.

In 2024, the rural district was separated from the district in the establishment of Jaydasht District, and Shahrak-e Shahid Dastgheyb was transferred to Hayqor Rural District created in the new district.
