= Rayisi =

Sakhteman-e Rayisi ساختمان رييسي
- Village
- Location within Iran
- Coordinates: 29°05′56″N 52°12′39″E
- Country: Iran
- Province: Fars
- County: Firuzabad
- Bakhsh: Meymand
- Rural District: Dadenjan

Population (2006)
  - Total: 134
- Time zone: UTC+3:30 (IRST)
  - Summer (DST): UTC+4:30 (IRDT)

Sakhteman-e Rayisi (Persian: ساختمان رييسي, also Romanized as Sākhtemān Rayīsī; also known as Reesī) is a village in Dadenjan Rural District, Meymand District, Firuzabad County, Fars province, Iran. At the 2006 census, its population was 134, in 25 families.
