= Lohrasb =

Lohraseb لهراسِب
- Village
- Location within Iran
- Coordinates: 28°47′35″N 52°31′35″E
- Country: Iran
- Province: Fars
- County: Firuzabad
- Bakhsh: Central
- Rural District: Ahmadabad

Population (2006)
  - Total: 339
- Time zone: UTC+3:30 (IRST)
  - Summer (DST): UTC+4:30 (IRDT)

Lohrasb (Persian: لهراسب, also Romanized as Lohrāsb; also known as Lohrāsbeh and Lohrāsbīyeh) is a village in Ahmadabad Rural District, in the Central District of Firuzabad County, Fars province, Iran. At the 2006 census, its population was 339, in 84 families.

== Notable residents ==
- Ladan and Laleh Bijani, Conjoined Twins
