= Chenar Sukhteh =

Chenar Sukhteh or Chenar-e Sukhteh (Persian: چنارسوخته) may refer to:

- Chenar Sukhteh, Bavanat, Fars Province
- Chenar Sukhteh, Dadenjan, Firuzabad County, Fars Province
- Chenar Sukhteh, Khvajehei, Firuzabad County, Fars Province
- Chenar-e Sukhteh, Jahrom, Fars Province
- Chenar Sukhteh, Mashhad, Razavi Khorasan Province
- Chenar Sukhteh, Sarakhs, Razavi Khorasan Province

== See also ==
- Sukhteh Chenar
