= Dowtujahan =

Dowtujahan دوتوجهان
- Village
- Location within Iran
- Coordinates: 28°40′09″N 52°48′02″E
- Country: Iran
- Province: Fars
- County: Firuzabad
- Bakhsh: Central
- Rural District: Jaydasht

Population (2006)
  - Total: 90
- Time zone: UTC+3:30 (IRST)
  - Summer (DST): UTC+4:30 (IRDT)

Dowtujahan (Persian: دوتوجهان, also Romanized as Dowtūjahān; also known as Dotūjahān) is a village in Jaydasht Rural District, in the Central District of Firuzabad County, Fars province, Iran. At the 2006 census, its population was 90, in 15 families.
