= Key Zarrin =

Key Zarrin كي زرين
- Village
- Location within Iran
- Coordinates: 28°52′57″N 52°32′04″E
- Country: Iran
- Province: Fars
- County: Firuzabad
- Bakhsh: Central
- Rural District: Ahmadabad

Population (2006)
  - Total: 362
- Time zone: UTC+3:30 (IRST)
  - Summer (DST): UTC+4:30 (IRDT)

Key Zarrin (Persian: كي زرين, also Romanized as Key Zarrīn) is a village in Ahmadabad Rural District, in the Central District of Firuzabad County, Fars province, Iran. At the 2006 census, its population was 362, in 74 families.
