= Panj Shir =

Panj Shir پنج شير
- Village
- Location within Iran
- Coordinates: 28°33′18″N 52°35′01″E
- Country: Iran
- Province: Fars
- County: Firuzabad
- Bakhsh: Central
- Rural District: Jaydasht

Population (2006)
  - Total: 181
- Time zone: UTC+3:30 (IRST)
  - Summer (DST): UTC+4:30 (IRDT)

Panj Shir (Persian: پنج شير, also Romanized as Panj Shīr) is a village in Jaydasht Rural District, in the Central District of Firuzabad County, Fars province, Iran. At the 2006 census, its population was 181, in 40 families.
