= Meygoli =

Meygoli ميگلي
- Village
- Location within Iran
- Coordinates: 29°11′34″N 52°15′35″E
- Country: Iran
- Province: Fars
- County: Firuzabad
- Bakhsh: Meymand
- Rural District: Dadenjan

Population (2006)
  - Total: 247
- Time zone: UTC+3:30 (IRST)
  - Summer (DST): UTC+4:30 (IRDT)

Meygoli (Persian: ميگلي, also Romanized as Meygolī and Maigali; also known as Maīqālī) is a village in Dadenjan Rural District, Meymand District, Firuzabad County, Fars province, Iran. At the 2006 census, its population was 247, in 54 families.
