= Ab Araq =

Ab Araq ابعراق
- Village
- Location within Iran
- Coordinates: 28°35′09″N 52°54′55″E
- Country: Iran
- Province: Fars
- County: Firuzabad
- Bakhsh: Central
- Rural District: Jaydasht

Population (2006)
  - Total: 62
- Time zone: UTC+3:30 (IRST)
  - Summer (DST): UTC+4:30 (IRDT)

Ab Araq (Persian: ابعراق, also Romanized as Āb 'Arāq) is a village in Jaydasht Rural District, in the Central District of Firuzabad County, Fars province, Iran. At the 2006 census, its population was 62, in 16 families.
