= Soru =

Soru may refer to:

- Renato Soru, an Italian internet entrepreneur
- Sõru, village in Hiiumaa Parish, Hiiu County, Estonia
- Soru, Azerbaijan, municipality in Lerik District, Azerbaijan
- Soru, Nepal, rural municipality in Karnali province, Nepal

== See also ==
- Ab Soru, a village in Iran
- Saru Castles
- Sors, Azerbaijan
