= Nowdaran =

Nowdaran نودران
- Village
- Location within Iran
- Coordinates: 28°49′06″N 52°28′06″E
- Country: Iran
- Province: Fars
- County: Firuzabad
- Bakhsh: Central
- Rural District: Ahmadabad

Population (2006)
  - Total: 646
- Time zone: UTC+3:30 (IRST)
  - Summer (DST): UTC+4:30 (IRDT)

Nowdaran (Persian: نودران, also Romanized as Nowdarān) is a village in Ahmadabad Rural District, in the Central District of Firuzabad County, Fars province, Iran. At the 2006 census, its population was 646, in 162 families.
