= Kemili =

Kemili كميلي
- Village
- Location within Iran
- Coordinates: 29°09′14″N 52°19′59″E
- Country: Iran
- Province: Fars
- County: Firuzabad
- Bakhsh: Meymand
- Rural District: Dadenjan

Population (2006)
  - Total: 84
- Time zone: UTC+3:30 (IRST)
  - Summer (DST): UTC+4:30 (IRDT)

Kemili (Persian: كميلي, also Romanized as Kemīlī; also known as Kemmelī) is a village in Dadenjan Rural District, Meymand District, Firuzabad County, Fars province, Iran. At the 2006 census, its population was 84, in 22 families.
