= Tang-e Dehuiyeh =

Tang-e Dehuiyeh تنگ دهويه
- Village
- Country: Iran
- Province: Fars
- County: Firuzabad
- Bakhsh: Central
- Rural District: Jaydasht

Population (2006)
  - Total: 72
- Time zone: UTC+3:30 (IRST)
  - Summer (DST): UTC+4:30 (IRDT)

Tang-e Dehuiyeh (Persian: تنگ دهويه, also Romanized as Tang-e Dehūīyeh) is a village in Jaydasht Rural District, in the Central District of Firuzabad County, Fars province, Iran. At the 2006 census, its population was 72, in 16 families.
