= Chahar Bid =

Chahar Bid (Persian: چهاربيد) may refer to:

- Chahar Bid-e Sartang, Fars Province
- Chahar Bid, North Khorasan
- Chahar Bid, Razavi Khorasan
- Chahar Bid, Sistan and Baluchestan
