= Salamatabad, Firuzabad =

Salamatabad سلامت آباد
- Village
- Country: Iran
- Province: Fars
- County: Firuzabad
- Bakhsh: Central
- Rural District: Ahmadabad

Population (2006)
  - Total: 171
- Time zone: UTC+3:30 (IRST)
  - Summer (DST): UTC+4:30 (IRDT)

Salamatabad (Persian: سلامت آباد, also Romanized as Salāmatābād) is a village in Ahmadabad Rural District, in the Central District of Firuzabad County, Fars province, Iran. At the 2006 census, its population was 171, in 31 families.
