= Par Zeytun =

Village in Fars province, Iran

Par Zeytun Persian: پرزيتون
- Village
- Location within Iran
- Coordinates: 28°51′32″N 52°51′05″E
- Country: Iran
- Province: Fars
- County: Firuzabad
- District: Meymand
- Rural District: Par Zeytun

Population (2016)
  - Total: 2,116
- Time zone: UTC+3:30 (IRST)

Par Zeytun (Persian: پرزيتون) (Note: Also romanized as Par Zeytūn; also known as Pareh Zeytūn and Tork Salvīyeh) is a village in, and the capital of, Par Zeytun Rural District of Meymand District, Firuzabad County, Fars province, Iran.

== Demographics ==
=== Population ===
At the time of the 2006 National Census, the village's population was 2,004 in 441 households. The following census in 2011 counted 2,131 people in 534 households. The 2016 census measured the population of the village as 2,116 people in 621 households. It was the most populous village in its rural district.
