= Baba Kamal =

Baba Kamal (Persian: باباكمال) may refer to:

- Baba Kamal, Fars
- Baba Kamal, Hamadan
- Baba Kamal, Kermanshah
