= Jaydasht =

Village in Fars province, Iran

Jaydasht Persian: جايدشت
- Village
- Location within Iran
- Coordinates: 28°48′21″N 52°38′08″E
- Country: Iran
- Province: Fars
- County: Firuzabad
- District: Jaydasht
- Rural District: Jaydasht

Population (2016)
  - Total: 5,524
- Time zone: UTC+3:30 (IRST)

Jaydasht (Persian: جايدشت) (Note: Also romanized as Jāydasht; also known as Jā Dasht) is a village in, and the former capital of, Jaydasht Rural District in Jaydasht District of Firuzabad County, Fars province, Iran, serving as capital of the district. The capital of the rural district has been transferred to the village of Rudbal.

== Demographics ==
=== Population ===
At the time of the 2006 National Census, the village's population was 6,389 in 1,294 households, when it was in the Central District. The following census in 2011 counted 6,721 people in 1,630 households. The 2016 census measured the population of the village as 5,524 people in 1,780 households. It was the most populous village in its rural district.

In 2024, the rural district was separated from the district in the establishment of Jaydasht District.
