= Ab Surakh, Fars =

Ab Surakh اب سوراخ
- Village
- Location within Iran
- Coordinates: 29°08′16″N 52°12′42″E
- Country: Iran
- Province: Fars
- County: Firuzabad
- Bakhsh: Meymand
- Rural District: Dadenjan

Population (2006)
  - Total: 78
- Time zone: UTC+3:30 (IRST)
  - Summer (DST): UTC+4:30 (IRDT)

Ab Surakh (Persian: اب سوراخ, also Romanized as Āb Sūrākh; also known as Ābsūrākhak) is a village in Dadenjan Rural District, Meymand District, Firuzabad County, Fars province, Iran. At the 2006 census, its population was 78, in 17 families.
