= Chahar Bid-e Sartang =

Chahar Bid-e Sartang چهاربيدسرتنگ
- Village
- Location within Iran
- Coordinates: 28°48′14″N 52°48′35″E
- Country: Iran
- Province: Fars
- County: Firuzabad
- Bakhsh: Meymand
- Rural District: Par Zeytun

Population (2006)
  - Total: 179
- Time zone: UTC+3:30 (IRST)
  - Summer (DST): UTC+4:30 (IRDT)

Chahar Bid-e Sartang (Persian: چهاربيدسرتنگ, also Romanized as Chahār Bīd-e Sartang) is a village in Par Zeytun Rural District, Meymand District, Firuzabad County, Fars province, Iran. At the 2006 census, its population was 179, in 43 families.
