= Khevid-e Mobaraki =

Khevid-e Mobaraki خويدمباركي
- Village
- Location within Iran
- Coordinates: 28°51′47″N 52°32′07″E
- Country: Iran
- Province: Fars
- County: Firuzabad
- Bakhsh: Central
- Rural District: Ahmadabad

Population (2006)
  - Total: 570
- Time zone: UTC+3:30 (IRST)
  - Summer (DST): UTC+4:30 (IRDT)

Khevid-e Mobaraki (Persian: خويدمباركي, also romanized as Khevīd-e Mobārakī) is a village in Ahmadabad Rural District, in the Central District of Firuzabad County, Fars province, Iran. At the 2006 census, its population was 570, in 124 families.
