= Baygan =

Village in Fars province, Iran

Baygan Persian: بايگان
- Village
- Location within Iran
- Coordinates: 28°51′56″N 52°25′29″E
- Country: Iran
- Province: Fars
- County: Firuzabad
- District: Central
- Rural District: Baygan

Population (2016)
  - Total: 2,481
- Time zone: UTC+3:30 (IRST)

Baygan (Persian: بايگان) (Note: Also romanized as Bāyegān and Bāygān; also known as Baygoon) is a village in, and the capital of, Baygan Rural District of the Central District in Firuzabad County, Fars province, Iran.

== Demographics ==
=== Population ===
At the time of the 2006 National Census, the village's population was 2,679 in 601 households, when it was in Ahmadabad Rural District. The following census in 2011 counted 2,747 people in 730 households. The 2016 census measured the population of the village as 2,481 people in 733 households. It was the most populous village in its rural district.

In 2024, Baygan was transferred to Baygan Rural District created in the district.
