= Ab Soru =

Ab Soru ابسرو
- Village
- Location within Iran
- Coordinates: 28°48′21″N 52°38′8″E
- Country: Iran
- Province: Fars
- County: Firuzabad
- Bakhsh: Central
- Rural District: Jaydasht

Population (2006)
  - Total: 31
- Time zone: UTC+3:30 (IRST)
  - Summer (DST): UTC+4:30 (IRDT)

Ab Soru (Persian: ابسرو, also Romanized as Āb Sorū) is a village in Jaydasht Rural District, in the Central District of Firuzabad County, Fars province, Iran. At the 2006 census, its population was 31, in 5 families.
