= Chenar Sukhteh, Dadenjan =

Village in Dadenjan Rural District

Chenar Sukhteh چنارسوخته
- Village
- Location within Iran
- Coordinates: 29°04′57″N 52°14′06″E
- Country: Iran
- Province: Fars
- County: Firuzabad
- Bakhsh: Meymand
- Rural District: Dadenjan

Population (2006)
  - Total: 409
- Time zone: UTC+3:30 (IRST)
  - Summer (DST): UTC+4:30 (IRDT)

Chenar Sukhteh (Persian: چنارسوخته, also Romanized as Chenār Sūkhteh) is a village in Dadenjan Rural District, Meymand District, Firuzabad County, Fars province, Iran. At the 2006 census, its population was 409, in 86 families.
