= Volume Interactions =

Volume Interactions Pte Ltd was a company that pioneered in the 1990s the use Virtual Reality technology in surgery planning. The company created and marketed the Dextroscope, the first commercial surgical planning system that used virtual reality principles going beyond the mouse and keyboard. The Dextroscope introduced a variation of Virtual Reality technology that didn't use Head-Mounted display (using instead a stereoscopic display that housed a two-handed 3D user interface) that provided a natural and comfortable interface to work with multi-modality 3D medical images for long periods of time. This environment was applied to the planning of patient-specific surgical approaches for several clinical disciplines, including neurosurgery, Ear-Nose-Throat, and liver surgery. The Dextroscope received world-wide attention by being involved in the planning of several craniopagus twin separations, most notably the Zambian twins (1997) and the German twins (2004) at Johns Hopkins Hospital led by Dr Benjamin Carson, and the Nepali twins separation at the Singapore General Hospital in 2001.

The Dextroscope was launched in Europe in 2000 and subsequently in Asia and the USA (2006). The company later introduced the Dextrobeam, a product designed to make 3D medical stereoscopic presentations to large audiences, using stereoscopic projection systems.

The company Quality Management System complied with the requirements of ISO 13485:2003 and the products were listed in the Singapore Medical Device Registration (SMDR) by the Health Sciences Authority of Singapore.

The Dextroscope and Dextrobeam received USA FDA 510(K) - class II (2002) clearance, CE Marking - class I (2002), China SFDA Registration - class II (2004) and Taiwan Registration - type P (Radiology) (2007).

The company was a spin-off company from the Kent Ridge Digital Labs research institute in Singapore. The company was founded in 2000 in Singapore by Luis Serra, Ng Hern, Ralf A Kockro, Eugene CK Lee, Chris Goh and Peter Munzel with seed capital from Life Sciences Investments (LSI) Pte Ltd., a co-investment fund of the Singapore Economic Development Board Investments Pte Ltd. (EDBI). It was later acquired by the Bracco Group in 2002. Volume Interactions ceased commercial operations in 2008.
