= Murdestan, Firuzabad =

Murdestan موردستان
- Village
- Location within Iran
- Coordinates: 28°54′04″N 52°32′34″E
- Country: Iran
- Province: Fars
- County: Firuzabad
- Bakhsh: Central
- Rural District: Ahmadabad

Population (2006)
  - Total: 669
- Time zone: UTC+3:30 (IRST)
  - Summer (DST): UTC+4:30 (IRDT)

Murdestan (Persian: موردستان, also Romanized as Mūrdestān) is a village in Ahmadabad Rural District, in the Central District of Firuzabad County, Fars province, Iran. At the 2006 census, its population was 669, in 139 families.
