= Chenar Sukhteh, Khvajehei =

Chenar Sukhteh چنارسوخته
- Village
- Location within Iran
- Coordinates: 29°00′15″N 52°36′37″E
- Country: Iran
- Province: Fars
- County: Firuzabad
- Bakhsh: Meymand
- Rural District: Khvajehei

Population (2006)
  - Total: 105
- Time zone: UTC+3:30 (IRST)
  - Summer (DST): UTC+4:30 (IRDT)

Chenar Sukhteh (Persian: چنارسوخته, also Romanized as Chenār Sūkhteh) is a village in Khvajehei Rural District, Meymand District, Firuzabad County, Fars province, Iran. At the 2006 census, its population was 105, in 22 families.
