= Jowkan =

Jowkan or Jovakan or Jookan or Jukan (Persian: جوكان) may refer to:

- Jowkan, Fars
- Jowkan, Bavanat, Fars Province
- Jowkan, Sistan and Baluchestan

== See also ==
- Admela Jukan, electrical engineer
- Amer Jukan, Slovenian footballer
