= Serizjan-e Namdi =

Serizjan-e Namdi سريزجان نمدي
- Village
- Location within Iran
- Coordinates: 29°02′00″N 52°22′00″E
- Country: Iran
- Province: Fars
- County: Firuzabad
- Bakhsh: Meymand
- Rural District: Khvajehei

Population (2006)
  - Total: 153
- Time zone: UTC+3:30 (IRST)
  - Summer (DST): UTC+4:30 (IRDT)

Serizjan-e Namdi (Persian: سريزجان نمدي, also Romanized as Serīzjān-e Namdī; also known as Serīzjān) is a village in Khvajehei Rural District, Meymand District, Firuzabad County, Fars province, Iran. At the 2006 census, its population was 153, in 32 families.
