= Khevid =

Khevid or Khavid (Persian: خويد) may refer to:

- Khevid Jan
- Khevid-e Mobaraki
