= Sir Yazjan-e Galeh Zan Abu ol Hasan Beygi =

Sir Yazjan-e Galeh Zan Abu ol Hasan Beygi سيريزجان گله زن ابوالحسن بيگي
- Village
- Location within Iran
- Coordinates: 29°03′39″N 52°20′49″E
- Country: Iran
- Province: Fars
- County: Firuzabad
- Bakhsh: Meymand
- Rural District: Khvajehei

Population (2006)
  - Total: 79
- Time zone: UTC+3:30 (IRST)
  - Summer (DST): UTC+4:30 (IRDT)

Sir Yazjan-e Galeh Zan Abu ol Hasan Beygi (Persian: سيريزجان گله زن ابوالحسن بيگي, also Romanized as Sīr Yazjān-e Galeh Zan Abū ol Ḩasan Beygī; also known as Sīr Yazjān) is a village in Khvajehei Rural District, Meymand District, Firuzabad County, Fars province, Iran. At the 2006 census, its population was 79, in 13 families.
