= Khevid Jan =

Khevid Jan خويدجان
- Village
- Location within Iran
- Coordinates: 28°48′30″N 52°30′42″E
- Country: Iran
- Province: Fars
- County: Firuzabad
- Bakhsh: Central
- Rural District: Ahmadabad

Population (2006)
  - Total: 864
- Time zone: UTC+3:30 (IRST)
  - Summer (DST): UTC+4:30 (IRDT)

Khevid Jan (Persian: خويدجان, also Romanized as Khevīd Jān and Khavīd Jān) is a village in Ahmadabad Rural District, in the Central District of Firuzabad County, Fars province, Iran. At the 2006 census, its population was 864, consisting of 187 families.
