= Kelisiun =

Kelisiun كليسيون
- Village
- Location within Iran
- Coordinates: 28°51′58″N 52°31′14″E
- Country: Iran
- Province: Fars
- County: Firuzabad
- Bakhsh: Central
- Rural District: Ahmadabad

Population (2006)
  - Total: 224
- Time zone: UTC+3:30 (IRST)
  - Summer (DST): UTC+4:30 (IRDT)

Kelisiun (Persian: كليسيون, also Romanized as Kelīsīūn; also known as Kalīseyān, Kelīsīān, Kelīsyūm, Kelīsyūn, Kelsīān, and Qal‘eh Siūn) is a village in Ahmadabad Rural District, in the Central District of Firuzabad County, Fars province, Iran. At the 2006 census, its population was 224, in 49 families.
