= Mehkuyeh-ye Olya =

Mehkuyeh-ye Olya مهكويه عليا
- Village
- Location within Iran
- Coordinates: 29°01′07″N 52°26′35″E
- Country: Iran
- Province: Fars
- County: Firuzabad
- Bakhsh: Meymand
- Rural District: Khvajehei

Population (2006)
  - Total: 78
- Time zone: UTC+3:30 (IRST)
  - Summer (DST): UTC+4:30 (IRDT)

Mehkuyeh-ye Olya (Persian: مهكويه عليا, also Romanized as Mehkūyeh-ye 'Olyā; also known as Mehkūyeh-ye Bālā) is a village in Khvajehei Rural District, Meymand District, Firuzabad County, Fars province, Iran. At the 2006 census, its population was 78, in 18 families.
