= Ahmadabad, Firuzabad =

Village in Fars province, Iran

Ahmadabad Persian: احمداباد
- Village
- Location within Iran
- Coordinates: 28°51′13″N 52°30′29″E
- Country: Iran
- Province: Fars
- County: Firuzabad
- District: Central
- Rural District: Ahmadabad

Population (2016)
  - Total: 1,602
- Time zone: UTC+3:30 (IRST)

Ahmadabad (Persian: احمداباد) (Note: Also romanized as Aḩmadābād) is a village in, and the capital of, Ahmadabad Rural District of the Central District of Firuzabad County, Fars province, Iran.

== Demographics ==
=== Population ===
At the time of the 2006 National Census, the village's population was 1,059 in 236 households. The following census in 2011 counted 1,144 people in 287 households. The 2016 census measured the population of the village as 1,602 people in 430 households.
