= Mehkuyeh =

Mehkuyeh (Persian: مهكويه) may refer to:

- Mehkuyeh-ye Olya
- Mehkuyeh-ye Sofla
