= Hayqor Rural District =

Rural district in Fars province, Iran

Hayqor Rural District Persian: دهستان هایقر
- Rural District
- Location within Iran
- Coordinates: 28°42′45″N 52°42′04″E
- Country: Iran
- Province: Fars
- County: Firuzabad
- District: Jaydasht
- Capital: Shahrak-e Shahid Dastgheyb
- Time zone: UTC+3:30 (IRST)

Hayqor Rural District (Persian: دهستان هایقر) is in Jaydasht District of Firuzabad County, Fars province, Iran. Its capital is the village of Shahrak-e Shahid Dastgheyb, whose population at the time of the 2016 National Census was 957 people in 248 households.

== History ==
In 2024, Jaydasht Rural District was separated from the Central District in the establishment of Jaydasht District, and Hayqor Rural District was created in the new district.
