= Jamar Jan =

Jamar Jan جمارجان
- Village
- Location within Iran
- Coordinates: 28°58′54″N 52°33′36″E
- Country: Iran
- Province: Fars
- County: Firuzabad
- Bakhsh: Meymand
- Rural District: Khvajehei

Population (2006)
  - Total: 31
- Time zone: UTC+3:30 (IRST)
  - Summer (DST): UTC+4:30 (IRDT)

Jamar Jan (Persian: جمارجان, also Romanized as Jamār Jān and Jomār Jān) is a village in Khvajehei Rural District, Meymand District, Firuzabad County, Fars province, Iran. At the 2006 census, its population was 31, in 7 families.
