= Murdestan =

Murdestan (Persian: موردستان) may refer to:

- Murdestan, Darab, Fars
- Murdestan, Firuzabad, Fars
- Murdestan, South Khorasan
