= Bavarkan =

Village in Fars province, Iran

Bavarkan Persian: بوركان
- Village
- Location within Iran
- Coordinates: 29°09′35″N 52°23′34″E
- Country: Iran
- Province: Fars
- County: Firuzabad
- District: Meymand
- Rural District: Khvajehei

Population (2016)
  - Total: 643
- Time zone: UTC+3:30 (IRST)

Bavarkan (Persian: بوركان) (Note: Also romanized as Bavārkān; also known as Barāvkān, Bīravakūn, and Pīr Afghān) is a village in Khvajehei Rural District of Meymand District, Firuzabad County, Fars province, Iran.

== Demographics ==
=== Population ===
At the time of the 2006 National Census, the village's population was 696 in 165 households. The following census in 2011 counted 673 people in 179 households. The 2016 census measured the population of the village as 643 people in 193 households. It was the most populous village in its rural district.
