= Darenjan-e Lor =

Darenjan-e Lor دارنجان لر
- Village
- Location within Iran
- Coordinates: 29°09′56″N 52°30′54″E
- Country: Iran
- Province: Fars
- County: Firuzabad
- Bakhsh: Meymand
- Rural District: Khvajehei

Population (2006)
  - Total: 315
- Time zone: UTC+3:30 (IRST)
  - Summer (DST): UTC+4:30 (IRDT)

Darenjan-e Lor (Persian: دارنجان لر, also Romanized as Dārenjān-e Lor and Dārenjān Lor; also known as Darenjan and Dārenjānlū) is a village in Khvajehei Rural District, Meymand District, Firuzabad County, Fars province, Iran. At the 2006 census, its population was 315, in 64 families.
