= Mehkuyeh-ye Sofla =

Mehkuyeh-ye Sofla مهكويه سفلي
- Village
- Location within Iran
- Coordinates: 29°00′43″N 52°29′19″E
- Country: Iran
- Province: Fars
- County: Firuzabad
- Bakhsh: Meymand
- Rural District: Khvajehei

Population (2006)
  - Total: 315
- Time zone: UTC+3:30 (IRST)
  - Summer (DST): UTC+4:30 (IRDT)

Mehkuyeh-ye Sofla (Persian: مهكويه سفلي, also Romanized as Mehkūyeh-ye Soflá; also known as Mehkūyeh-ye Pāeen) is a village in Khvajehei Rural District, Meymand District, Firuzabad County, Fars province, Iran. At the 2006 census, its population was 315, in 74 families.
