= Salamatabad =

Salamatabad (Persian: سلامت آباد) may refer to:

- Salamatabad, Firuzabad, Fars Province
- Salamatabad, Kharameh, Fars Province
- Salamatabad, Kurdistan
