= Baba Kamal, Fars =

Baba Kamal باباكمال
- Village
- Location within Iran
- Coordinates: 28°51′45″N 52°23′14″E
- Country: Iran
- Province: Fars
- County: Firuzabad
- Bakhsh: Central
- Rural District: Ahmadabad

Population (2006)
  - Total: 147
- Time zone: UTC+3:30 (IRST)
  - Summer (DST): UTC+4:30 (IRDT)

Baba Kamal (Persian: باباكمال, also Romanized as Bābā Kamāl) is a village in Ahmadabad Rural District, in the Central District of Firuzabad County, Fars province, Iran. At the 2006 census, its population was 147, in 31 families, meaning that the average family size in Bama Kamal is 4.74.
