= Sir Yazjan-e Galeh Zan Mazarai =

Sir Yazjan-e Galeh Zan Mazarai سيريزجان گله زن مزارعي
- Village
- Location within Iran
- Coordinates: 28°57′31″N 52°32′52″E
- Country: Iran
- Province: Fars
- County: Firuzabad
- Bakhsh: Meymand
- Rural District: Khvajehei

Population (2006)
  - Total: 72
- Time zone: UTC+3:30 (IRST)
  - Summer (DST): UTC+4:30 (IRDT)

Sir Yazjan-e Galeh Zan Mazarai (Persian: سيريزجان گله زن مزارعي, also Romanized as Sīr Yazjān-e Galeh Zan Mazāra‘ī; also known as Sarīz Jān, Serīzjān, Serīzqān, and Surzakūn) is a village in Khvajehei Rural District, Meymand District, Firuzabad County, Fars province, Iran. At the 2006 census, its population was 72, in 13 families.
