= Jamar =

Jamar may refer to the following:

== People ==
=== Given name ===
- Jamar Beasley (born 1979), American football player
- Jamar Butler (born 1985), US basketball point guard
- Jamar Chess (born 1980), US music publisher
- Jamar Davis (born 1984), American streetball player
- Jamar Diggs (born 1988), US professional basketball player
- Jamar Fletcher (born 1979), American football player
- Jamar Johnson (born 1999), American football player
- Jamar Nesbit (born 1976), American football player
- Jamar Samuels (born 1989), American basketball player
- Jamar Summers (born 1995), American football player
- Jamar Williams (born 1984), American football player
- Jamar, mononym used by American Idol – first season semifinalist

=== Surname ===
- Alexandre Jamar, Belgian businessman, liberal politician and governor of the National Bank
- Dieudonné Jamar, pro racing cyclist
- Hervé Jamar, Belgian politician, liberal MR party
- Jeff Jamar, FBI Special Agent in charge at the 1993 Waco siege
- Kareem Jamar, US basketball player
- Mark Jamar (nickname "Russian", born 1983), Australian rules football player

=== Pseudonym ===
- Lord Jamar, stage name of Lorenzo Dechalus, US rapper and actor

== Places ==
- Jamar, Gujarat, a village and former Rajput petty princely state on Saurashtra peninsula, western India
- Jamar Jan, a village in Khvajehei Rural District, Meymand District, Firuzabad County, Iran

== See also ==
- Jamarr
