= Jowkan, Fars =

Village in Fars province, Iran

Jowkan Persian: جوكان
- Village
- Location within Iran
- Coordinates: 29°02′21″N 52°34′15″E
- Country: Iran
- Province: Fars
- County: Firuzabad
- District: Meymand
- Rural District: Khvajehei

Population (2016)
  - Total: 365
- Time zone: UTC+3:30 (IRST)

Jowkan (Persian: جوكان) (Note: Also romanized as Jookan, Jovakān, and Jowkān; also known as Jowvakān) is a village in, and the capital of, Khvajehei Rural District of Meymand District, Firuzabad County, Fars province, Iran.

== Demographics ==
=== Population ===
At the time of the 2006 National Census, the village's population was 293 in 72 households. The following census in 2011 counted 282 people in 79 households. The 2016 census measured the population of the village as 365 people in 106 households.
