= Shahrak-e Shahid Dastghib =

Shahrak-e Shahid Dastghib or Shahrak-e Shahid Dastgheyb (Persian: شهرك شهيددستغيب) may refer to:

- Shahrak-e Shahid Dastgheyb, Fars
- Shahrak-e Shahid Dastghib, South Khorasan
