= Baleqlu =

Baleqlu (Persian: بالقلو) may refer to:

- Baleqlu, Fars
- Baleqlu, Markazi
