= Dextroscope =

Virtual Reality environment

The Dextroscope is a medical equipment system that creates a virtual reality (VR) environment in which surgeons can plan neurosurgical and other surgical procedures.

The Dextroscope is designed to show a patient's 3D anatomical relationships and pathology in great detail. Although its main purpose is for planning surgery, the dextroscope has also proven useful in research in cardiology, radiology and medical education.

== History ==
The Dextroscope started as a research project in the mid-90s at the Kent Ridge Digital Labs research institute (part of Singapore's Agency for Science, Technology and Research (A*STAR)). It was initially named the Virtual Workbench and underwent commercialization in 2000 by the company Volume Interactions Pte Ltd with the name Dextroscope. The Dextroscope was selected in 2021 by A*STAR as one of the 30 innovations and inventions that pushed scientific boundaries, made an economic impact or improved lives over its 30 years history (A*STAR@30: 30 Innovations and Inventions Over Three Decades).

The Dextroscope was designed to be a practical variation of Virtual Reality which introduced an alternative to the prevalent trend of full immersion of the 1990s. Instead of immersing the whole user into a virtual reality, it just immersed the neurosurgeon into the patient data.

== Description ==
The Dextroscope allows its user to interact intuitively with a Virtual Patient. This Virtual Patient is composed of computer-generated 3D multi-modal images obtained from any DICOM tomographic data including CT, MRI, MRA, MRV, functional MRI and CTA, PET, SPECT and Tractography. The Dextroscope can work with any multi-modality combination, supporting polygonal meshes as well.

The surgeon sits at the Dextroscope 3D interaction console and manipulates the Virtual Patient using both hands, similar to real life. Using stereoscopic visualisations displayed via a mirror, the surgeon sees the Virtual Patient floating behind the mirror but within easy reach of the hands. The surgeon uses flexible 3D hand movements to rotate and manipulate the object of interest. The Dextroscope allows virtual segmentation of organs and structures, making accurate 3D measurements, etc.

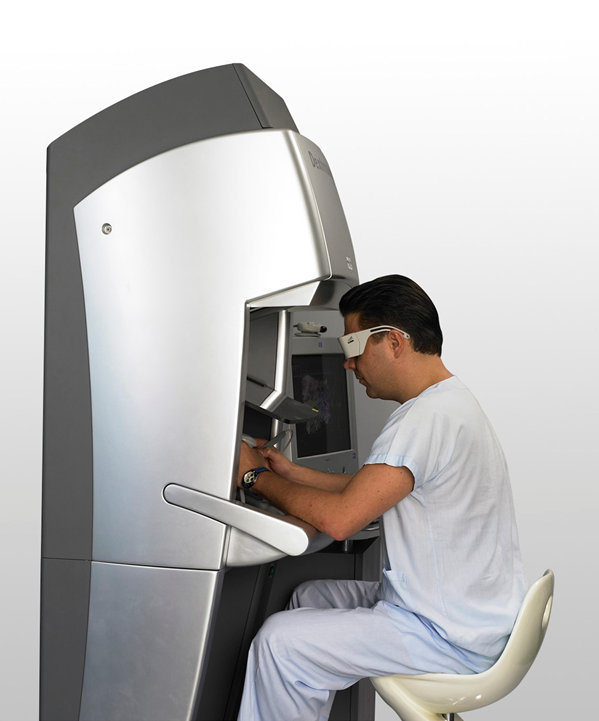
The Dextroscope.

In one hand the surgeon holds a handle with a switch that, when pressed, allows the 3D image to be moved freely as if it were an object held in real space. The other hand holds a pencil shaped stylus that the surgeon uses to select tools from a virtual control panel and perform detailed manipulations on the 3D image.

The surgeon does not see the stylus, handle or his/her hands directly, as they are hidden behind the surface of the mirror. Instead he/she sees a virtual handle and stylus calibrated to appear in exactly the same position as the real handle and stylus. The virtual handle can serve as a drill tool, measurement tool, cutter, etc.

The Dextroscope allows surgeons to interact with and manipulate the Virtual Patient, such as simulating inter-operative viewpoints or the removal of bone and soft tissue. The surgeon is able to reach inside and manipulate the image interior.

== Virtual tools ==
The Dextroscope provides virtual tools to manipulate the 3D image. The surgeon can use them within the virtual person to extract surgically relevant structures like the cortex or a tumor , extract blood vessels, or to adjust the color and transparency of displayed structures to see deep inside the patient. The surgeon can simulated the removal of bone using a simulated skull drilling tool.

Typical structures that can be segmented are tumors, blood vessels, aneurysms, parts of the skull base, and organs. Segmentation is done either automatically (when the structures are demarcated clearly by their outstanding image intensity - such as the cortex) or through user interaction (using for example an outlining tool to define the extent of the structure manually).

A virtual ‘pick’ tool allows the user to pick a segmented object and uncouple it from its surroundings for closer inspection. A measurement tool provides accurate measurement of straight and curving 3D structures such as the scalp, and measure angles, such as those between vessels or bony structures (for example, when planning the insertion of a screw into the spine).

== Neurosurgery planning – case studies and evaluations ==
The use of the Dextroscope has been reported for several neurosurgical clinical scenarios;

Screen Capture from the Dextroscope. This image shows a moment during the planning of a typical neurosurgical procedure involving an MRI, DTI, TMS data modalities.

- cerebral arteriovenous malformations

- aneurysms

- cranial nerve decompression (in cases of trigeminal neuralgia and hemifacial spasm)

- meningiomas (convexity, falcine or parasagittal)

- ependymomas or subependymomas

- craniopagus twin separation

- transnasal approaches

- key-hole approaches

- epilepsy

- and a great variety of deep-brain and skull base tumors (pituitary adenomas, craniopharyngiomas, arachnoid cysts, colloid cysts, cavernomas , hemangioblastomas, chordomas, epidermoids, gliomas, jugular schwannomas, aqueductal stenosis, stenosis of Monro foramen, hippocampal sclerosis).

Brain and spine pathology, such as cervical fractures of the spine, syringomyelia, and sacral nerve root neurinomas have been evaluated.

For other uses of the Dextroscope in neurosurgery refer to .

== Other surgical specialties ==
The Dextroscope has been applied also outside of neurosurgery to benefit any patient presenting a surgical challenge: an anatomical or structural complexity that requires planning of the surgical (or interventional) approach, for example, ENT orthopedic, trauma and cranio-facial surgery, cardiac surgery and liver resection.

== Dextroscope and diagnostic imaging ==
Dextroscope is not just for surgeons – radiologists use it, too. The rapid growth in multi-modal diagnostic imaging data routinely available has increased their workload. Using the Dextroscope, radiologists can reconstruct multimodal models from high volumes of 2D slices – hence facilitating a better understanding of the 3D anatomical structures and helping with the diagnosis.

Furthermore, the Dextroscope virtual reality environment helps bridge the gap between radiology and surgery - by allowing the radiologist to easily demonstrate to surgeons important 3D structures in a way that surgeons are familiar with.
This demonstration capability makes it also useful as a base for medical educators in which to convey 3D information to students. In order to reach a larger group of people in a classroom or auditorium, a version was manufactured called Dextrobeam.

The Dextroscope was installed, (among other medical and research institutions) at:

Medical/research institution	Main use
Hirslanden Hospital (Zurich, Switzerland)	Neurosurgery
St Louis University Hospital (St Louis, US)	Neurosurgery
Stanford University Medical Center (San Francisco, US)	Neurosurgery and craniomaxillofacial surgery
Johns Hopkins Hospital (Baltimore, US)	Radiology research
Rutgers New Jersey Medical School (Newark, US)	Neurosurgery, ENT
Hospital of the University of Pennsylvania (Philadelphia, US)	Neurosurgery and cardiovascular radiology
Weill Cornell Brain and Spine Center (New York, US)	Neurosurgery
Johannes Gutenberg University Mainz (Germany)	Neurosurgery and medical education
Hospital del Mar (Barcelona, Spain)	Neurosurgery
Université Catholique de Louvain, Cliniques Universitaires St-Luc (Brussels, Belgium)	Neurosurgery
Istituto Neurologico C. Besta (Milan, Italy)	Neurosurgery
Royal London Hospital (London, UK)	Neurosurgery
Faculty of Medicine, University of Barcelona (Barcelona, Spain)	Neurosurgery research & neuroanatomy
Inselpital (Bern, Switzerland)	ENT
School of Medicine, University of Split (Split, Croatia)	Neurophysiology research
National Neuroscience Institute (Singapore)	Neurosurgery
SINAPSE Institute (Singapore)	Neurosurgery research
Prince of Wales Hospital (Hong Kong)	Neurosurgery and orthopedics
Hua Shan Hospital (Shanghai, China)	Neurosurgery
Advanced Surgery Training Centre of the National University Hospital (Singapore)	Medical education
Fujian Medical University (Fuzhou, China)	Neurosurgery and maxillofacial surgery

== Dextroscope in the operating room: DEX-Ray ==
The Dextroscope was a pre-operative planning system which created 3D patient-specific virtual models. To bring the patient data into the operating room, in particular to neurosurgery, the DEX-Ray augmented reality neurosurgical navigation system was developed in 2006-2008. DEX-Ray overlaid 3D virtual patient information over a video stream obtained from a proprietary handheld tracked video probe designed by the company. This allowed image guidance by displaying co-registered planning data over the real images of the patient seen by the video camera, so that the clinician had 'see-through' visualization on the patient's head, and helped plan the craniotomy and guide during the intervention. The DEX-Ray was clinically tested at the Singapore National Neuroscience Institute (Singapore) and at the Hospital Clinic Barcelona (Spain). It was not released as a commercial product.

== Commercialization ==
The Dextroscope and Dextrobeam were products of Volume Interactions Pte Ltd (a member of the Bracco Group), a company spun-off from the Kent Ridge Digital Labs research institute in Singapore. They received USA FDA 510(K) - class II (2002) clearance, CE Marking - class I (2002), China SFDA Registration - class II (2004) and Taiwan Registration - type P (Radiology) (2007). For a comprehensive overview of the Dextroscope refer to the Springer International Publishing book chaper.
