= Dadenjan =

Village in Fars province, Iran

Dadenjan Persian: دادنجان
- Village
- Location within Iran
- Coordinates: 29°06′54″N 52°13′42″E
- Country: Iran
- Province: Fars
- County: Firuzabad
- District: Meymand
- Rural District: Dadenjan

Population (2016)
  - Total: 277
- Time zone: UTC+3:30 (IRST)

Dadenjan (Persian: دادنجان) (Note: Also romanized as Dādenjān; also known as Dārenjān) is a village in, and the capital of, Dadenjan Rural District of Meymand District, Firuzabad County, Fars province, Iran.

== Demographics ==
=== Population ===
At the time of the 2006 National Census, the village's population was 386 in 86 households. The following census in 2011 counted 345 people in 87 households. The 2016 census measured the population of the village as 277 people in 102 households. It was the most populous village in its rural district.
