= Kelsian =

Kelsian may refer to:

- Kelsian Group, Australian transport operator
- Kelisiun, village in Iran
