= Ganga and Jamuna Shrestha =

Nepali conjoined twins

Ganga and Jamuna Shrestha were a pair of Nepali conjoined twins who underwent surgery to be separated in Singapore in 2001 when they were 11 months old.

== Before surgery ==
The Shrestha twins were born on May 9, 2000 to Sandhya Shrestha and Bhusan KC in the town of Khalanga in western Nepal. The girls were craniopagus twins, meaning that they were joined at the top of their heads. Ganga and Jamuna were named for India's sacred rivers, the Ganges and the Jamuna, which merge. Prior to being separated, they were referred to legally as Ganga-Jamuna, sharing a single passport.

== Surgery ==
The family travelled to Singapore on October 11, 2000, where the medical team, led by pediatric neurosurgeon Dr. Keith Goh, spent six months preparing for the surgery. This preparation included performing magnetic resonance imaging (MRI), angiography, magnetic resonance angiography, and a three-dimensional CT scan on the twins. Advanced computer imaging, which had never before been used in Singapore was completed with the images from these procedures. The imaging was then used to determine whether the twins could be successfully separated, and once it was determined that they could be, it was used to create realistic plastic models of their heads. These models were used to prepare the team for the surgery and as references during the surgery. A dextroscope was also used to model the babies' bodies, allowing the medical team to practice virtual surgery as they prepared. In practicing, Dr. Goh also collaborated via teleconference with Dr. Ben Carson, who performed the first successful separation of craniopagus twins.

The separation surgery began on April 6, 2001. It was anticipated that the surgery would last for 30 hours. However, the girls were finally separated after 88 hours, and in total, Jamuna required 94 hours and Ganga required 102 hours of surgery. The surgery was complicated by the fact that the sisters' brains were fused together and that the girls had to be rotated several times.

The surgery to separate Ganga and Jamuna and further treatments were funded by donations from both Nepali-Singaporeans and non-Nepali Singaporeans, totalling $200,924 to $362,779.

== Aftermath ==
Although both survived the surgery, believed to be only the second successful surgery of its kind, they had varying degrees of impairment. According to their mother, Sandhya Shrestha, the girls "seemed like normal children" before their surgery. However, following the operation, Ganga had brain damage due to a brain infection during the surgery and was unable to sit up or speak, sleeping the majority of the time. Jamuna was unable to walk and had limited speech but was expected to develop normally. After their surgery, the twins were also more susceptible to head injuries due to the way their heads were repaired.

Both children required further surgeries and treatments, including the restructuring of Ganga's head to accommodate the size of her brain and the correcting of a bone defect in Jamuna's skull along with cranioplasty to improve the shape of her head. Some of the further treatments were completed in Singapore, but the family was forced to temporarily relocate from their village to Kathmandu in order to provide the girls with medical care, straining them financially.

Ganga subsequently died in July 2008 of pneumonia and meningitis in a hospital in Kathmandu.

== In popular culture ==
Upon returning to Nepal after their surgery, the girls were treated as celebrities and their successful surgery was considered a miracle.

In 2016, a book was published in Singapore about their lives. The book, Ganga Jamuna by Sunita Lad Bhamray, is inspired by the girls and their family, but is ultimately a work of fiction. A portion of the profits were used to fund further medical treatments needed for Jamuna.
