= Sors (disambiguation) =

Sors is an ancient Roman god of luck.

Sors may also refer to:

- The singular form of sortes
- Sors, Azerbaijan
- Statistical Office of the Republic of Slovenia
- Spatially Offset Raman Spectroscopy
