= Shafaq Cave =

Cave in Iran

Shafaq is a cave located 140 km east of Shiraz, near Meymand, Iran. It is a caving destination in Fars province that features stalagmites and stalactites, and lies within a mountain with two entrances eastward into the cave.
