= Jadon and Anias McDonald =

Formerly conjoined twins

Jadon and Anias McDonald are a pair of formerly conjoined craniopagus twins. They were separated by Dr. James Goodrich and a team of forty doctors in a nearly 30 hour surgery on October 14, 2016 at Children's Hospital at Montefiore when they were thirteen months old.

Less than a year after they were separated, they returned home to their house in New York's Orange County to live with parents, Nicole and Christian, and older brother, Aza before relocating to Indiana in late 2018. Before they were separated, the boys and family lived in the Bronx, but their family purchased the home in foreclosure while the boys were in rehab at Blythedale Children's Hospital. At home, they had 20 hours a week of in-home therapy. Following separation, both twins had to relearn how to sit up and crawl, among other developmental milestones. Anais required a breathing machine, among other medical needs, which initially slowed his development compared to his brother. He later had his tonsils and adenoids removed, allowing him to breathe independently.

Separated: Saving the Twins is the story of their separation and recovery.
