= András Csókay =

Hungarian neurosurgeon

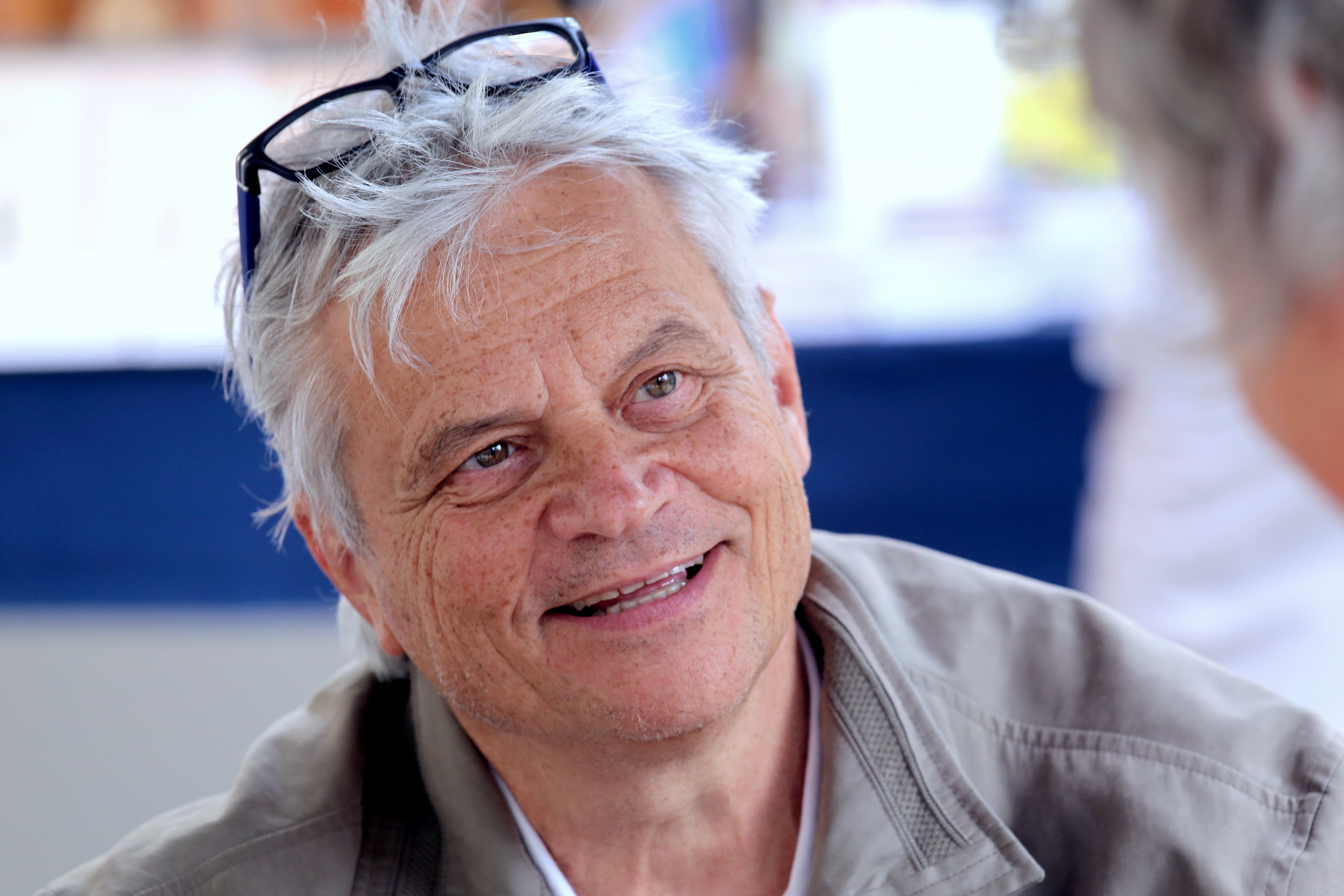
- Born: 16 February 1956 (age 70); Budapest, Hungary
- Citizenship: Hungarian
- Education: ELTE Apáczai Csere János Gyakorló Gimnázium és Kollégium Budapest University of Technology and Economics Semmelweis University
- Awards: Prima Primissima Prize (2005) Commander Cross of the Order of Merit of the Hungarian Republic (2011) Semmelweis Ignác Award (2018) Honorary citizen of Budapest (2019) Honorary citizen of Óbuda-Békásmegyer (2020)

András Csókay (born 16 February 1956), is a Hungarian neurosurgeon known for his development of a technique to enhance microsurgical precision in the vascular tunnel and for the separation of a pair of Bangladeshi (Islam) Craniopagus Twins.

== Studies ==
András Csókay graduated from Apáczai Csere János Gymnasium of the Eötvös Loránd University (ELTE) in 1974. From 1975 to 1980 he studied at the Faculty of Civil Engineering of the Budapest University of Technology and Economics.

Csókay started his career as an engineer, and after three years he enrolled at Semmelweis University, where he graduated with a medical degree in 1989. Subsequently, in 1994, he obtained a state examination in neurosurgery.

== Career ==
From 1989 Csókay became a specialist at the National Institute of Neuroscience (OKITI) in Budapest and from 1993 he worked at the National Clinic and Trauma Institute, Department of Neurosurgery. Between 2003 and 2007 he lived in Szombathely and headed the neurosurgery department of Markusovszky Hospital. In 2007 he moved back to Budapest and directed the Neurosurgery Department of Szent János's Hospital. He became a university lecturer at his alma mater, Semmelweis University. From 2010 he became head of neurosurgery at the Borsod-Abaúj-Zemplén County Central Hospital in Miskolc.

Three years later Csókay moved back to Budapest and became head of the neurosurgery department of the Hungarian Army Medical Center from 1 August 2013. He brought with him two surgical techniques, namely the microvascular technique and a new practical concept in neurosurgery technique. Initially, he specialized in the treatment of severe skull and spinal injuries, with special attention to children with cranial injuries.

== Separation surgery of Bangladeshi craniopagus twins ==
Since 2003, Csókay has conducted practical scientific research in brain microsurgery. His motto is not to practice on the living, so he practices an hour a day in the autopsy room on fresh deceased people. His practical discoveries here became the basis of his scientific work, which he relied on during the 30-hour separation surgery to separate a pair of Bangladeshi craniopagus twins

They were asked to separate the twins, Rabeya and Rukeya Islam, back in 2017. Csókay led the "Cselekvés a Kiszolgáltatottakért Alapítvány's" team of more than 30 neurosurgeons, plastic surgeons, anesthesiologists and intensive care specialists; he conducted the final separation surgery of the craniopagus twins at the military hospital in Dhaka. In March 2021, the twins were allowed to leave the hospital permanently and have been living with their parents ever since.

== Research ==
Csókay made known in 1998 the vascular tunnel technique he developed, a new method for treating severe traumatic brain swelling, a new development for surgical solutions to improve the efficacy of decompressive craniectomy. The essence of the vascular tunnel technique is to protect the cortical blood vessels of protruded brain from blockage after craniectomy at the dural and bone edge with pillars by forming a tunnel. A new technique to improve microsurgical accuracy was another step in his research.

== Family ==
He is married to Daniella Altay. They had five children, the youngest of whom died tragically.

== Awards ==
- Prima Primissima Prize (2005)
- Commander Cross of the Order of Merit of the Hungarian Republic (2011)
- Semmelweis Ignác Award (2018)
- Honorary citizen of Budapest (2019)
- Honorary citizen of Óbuda-Békásmegyer (2020)

== Books ==
- Martha Tailor [Radnai Gáborné]: Alagút az agyban. Beszélgetés Dr. Csókay András idegsebésszel; Radnai, Bp., 2002
- Alagút az agyban. Gondolatok, cselekedetek és csodák; Arcvonal Irodalmi Kávézó, Bp., 2004
- A hit nem elméleti kérdés. Csókay András agysebésszel beszélget Halász Zsuzsa; Kairosz, Bp., 2005 (Miért hiszek?) ISBN 963-7510-74-5
- Ha Isten velünk, ki ellenünk? Van kiút a hazai válságból; Kairosz, Bp., 2007, ISBN 978-963-662-042-4
- Magyarság a hivatásunk. Csókay Andrással beszélget Csengei Ágota; Kairosz, Bp., 2007 (Magyarnak lenni)
- Bátorság az örömhöz; Kairosz Könyvkiadó, 2008, ISBN 978-963-662-151-3
- Lélekjelenlét. Szellemi ébredés kell!; Kairosz Könyvkiadó, 2009, ISBN 978-963-662-210-7
- Alagút az agyban. Gondolatok, cselekedetek és csodák; Masszi Kiadó, 2009, ISBN 978-963-9851-15-3
- Muhari-Papp Sándor Balázs–Csókay András: Művészet és idegsebészet együtt a hitben; Kairosz, 2011, ISBN 978-963-662-450-7
- Agysebészet rózsafüzérrel. Vallomások útközben; Szt. István Társulat, Bp., 2013, ISBN 978-963-277-408-4
- Muhari-Papp Sándor Balázs–Csókay András: Művészet és idegsebészet együtt a hitben; 2. átdolg. kiad.; Kairosz, Bp., 2015
- Idegsebészet és hétköznapi misztika. "Jól látod, apu!"; Szt. István Társulat, Bp., 2016
- Csókay András–Skrabski Fruzsina: Párbeszéd a megpróbáltatásról, a létről és a jelenlétről; Éghajlat, Bp., 2019
- Muhari-Papp Sándor Balázs–Csókay András: Kómámtól Bangladesig; Kairosz, Bp., 2019
- Orvosmissziók Jézus imával; Szt. Gellért kiadó, Bp., 2020
