= Owase Jeelani =

Kashmiri-British neurosurgeon

- Medical career
- Field: Paediatric Neurosurgery
- Institutions: Great Ormond Street Hospital

Noor ul Owase Jeelani is a Kashmiri-British neurosurgeon and academic. He is a consultant paediatric neurosurgeon at Great Ormond Street Hospital for Children (GOSH) and was the Head of the Department of Neurosurgery from 2012 until 2018. He is Professor of Paediatric Neurosurgery at the Institute of Child Health, University College London. He leads the FaceValue research group in Craniofacial Morphometrics, device design, and clinical outcomes.

Dr Jeelani is known for his work separating craniopagus twins in 2011, 2019, 2020 2021, 2022 and 2024.

In 2019, he founded the charity Gemini Untwined. In 2025, Dr Jeelani was awarded an MBE in the King's Birthday Honours list for outstanding contributions to neurosurgery and global health.

== Education and career ==
Dr Jeelani obtained his Medical Degree in 1997 from the University of Nottingham. His basic surgical training took place in Nottingham and Southampton, and his Neurosurgical and Craniofacial training took place in the UK and Canada. He undertook fellowships in Paediatric Neurosurgery and Craniofacial Surgery at GOSH and at Sick Kids, Toronto. He also holds a Master's degree in Medical Law from the University of Glasgow from 2005 and an MBA from INSEAD in 2002.

In 2012 Dr Jeelani was appointed as the Lead Clinician for the Department of Neurosurgery at Great Ormond Street Hospital. He was named in ‘The Times’ top 100 surgeons in the UK in 2011 and the top 100 children's doctors in 2012.

He led the successful separation of seven sets of conjoined twins: Rital and Ritag in 2011, Safa and Marwa in 2019, Yigit and Derman in 2020 and Israeli twins in 2021. In 2022 Jeelani was part of a UK and Brazilian team that separated Bernardo and Arthur Lima, two Brazilian twins, in a 33 hour operation. On July 19, 2024, Jeelani lead a team at Ankara Bilkent City Hospital in Turkey, using mixed reality technology, to complete a 14-hour second stage surgery to separate Pakistani twins, Minal and Mirha. These procedures were covered extensively by international media outlets.

Since 2012 he has been the co-director of FaceValue, a research programme based at University College London (UCL) that specialises in designing machine learning algorithms to improve surgical outcomes.

In 2007, Dr Jeelani invented CranioXpand, a spring distractor technology for minimally invasive Craniofacial surgery. The IP was obtained by KLS Martin, a medical devices company.

Dr Jeelani undertakes healthcare advisory work for the NHS and other private organisations. In 2003 he founded a strategy consulting company, Interface Health Solutions.

== Charity Work ==
In 2019, he co-founded Gemini Untwined, a global charity dedicated to supporting the research and treatment for CPT twins.
