= Ladan and Laleh Bijani =

Iranian conjoined twin sisters

- لادن و لاله بیژنی
- Ladan (left) and Laleh (right) Bijani in a press conference in June 2003, about one month before their deaths
- Born: 17 January 1974; Firuzabad, Iran
- Died: 8 July 2003 (aged 29); Singapore
- Cause of death: Surgical complications
- Education: University of Tehran
- Known for: Conjoined twins
- Parent(s): Dadollah Bijani; Maryam Safari

Ladan and Laleh Bijani (Persian: لادن و لاله بیژنی; 17 January 1974 – 8 July 2003) were Iranian conjoined twin sisters. They were joined at the head and died soon after their complicated surgical separation. Coincidentally, the twins were born a century to the day after the deaths of Chang and Eng Bunker, also conjoined twins, famously known as the "original" Siamese twins.

== Biography ==
Laden and Laleh Bijani were born on 17 January 1974, in Firuzabad, a city in southwest Iran, to Dadollah Bijani and Maryam Safari, members of a farming family from the nearby Lohrasb village. The Bijani twins were lost in a hospital in 1979 after the doctors responsible for them had to suddenly leave for the United States during the revolution in Iran. The Bijanis' parents did not find the twins again until several years later in the city of Karaj near Tehran, where Alireza Safaian had adopted them. While in his custody, Safaian attempted to protect the twins by sequestering them from the world as best as he could. In 1996, after years of searching, the twins' biological parents finally tracked them down and made contact. In their early twenties, the twins lived on their own in an apartment while attending law school.

Ladan wanted to be a lawyer, while Laleh wished to become a journalist; in the end, they settled on Ladan's choice. They studied law for four years at Tehran University. Most other personal decisions also had to meet each other's approval. For these and other reasons, the twins had wanted to be separated since they were children. Laleh hoped that she could then move to Tehran, the capital city of Iran, to study journalism, while Ladan wanted to continue with graduate studies in law and then move to Shiraz.

In addition, the twins had different hobbies. While Laleh liked to, among other things, play computer games, Ladan preferred computer programming. Ladan also described Laleh as more introverted and herself as quite talkative.

== Separation ==
In 1996, the Bijani twins travelled to Germany, trying to convince doctors there to separate them. However, the German doctors declined to operate, saying that the risk of separation surgery would be too high for both of them.

In November 2002, after meeting Keith Goh, the Bijani twins travelled to Singapore to undergo the separation. Although they were warned by the doctors that the surgery to separate them would still be very risky, the twins were very determined. Their decision to proceed with the operation led to considerable international media interest.

=== Surgery ===
After eight months in Singapore, doing extensive psychiatric and legal evaluations, the Bijani twins underwent surgery on 6 July 2003, under the care of a large team of international specialists at Raffles Hospital, composed of 28 doctors and more than 100 medical assistants working in shifts. A specially designed chair was required that allowed the operation to be performed with both twins in a sitting position.

Goh led the team to operate on Laleh while Ben Carson, director of paediatric surgery at the Johns Hopkins Children's Centre, led the team operating on Ladan.

The attempt to separate the twins turned out to be very difficult, because their brains not only shared a major vein (the superior sagittal sinus), but had fused together. During the operation, doctors encountered a mass of previously undetected blood vessels. In addition, an undetected major vein hidden from the scans was discovered during the operation. Goh decided to continue with the operation while Carson felt that the surgery should have stopped at that moment.

The separation was achieved on 8 July 2003, but it was announced then that the twins were in critical condition, both having lost a large volume of blood due to complications of the operation.

The separation stage of the surgery was completed at 13:30 SST, but there was significant blood loss during the blood vessel repairing process, and Ladan Bijani died at around 14:30 on the operating table; her sister Laleh Bijani died 90 minutes later. Their deaths were announced by the chairman of Raffles Hospital, Loo Choon Yong. A coroner inquest was held after the deaths of the conjoined twins and their deaths were ruled a misadventure.

The twins' operation was referenced in an episode of Grey's Anatomy with Annie and Lizzie being conjoined twins attempting separation.

== Burials ==
The sisters were buried in accordance to Shiite Muslim traditions in separate tombs, side by side, in Lohrasb. The sisters willed their property to blind and orphaned children.

A documentary about the operation was broadcast soon after. Later, people named 17 January as Hope's day.
