= Baygan Rural District =

Rural district in Fars province, Iran

Baygan Rural District Persian: دهستان بایگان
- Rural District
- Location within Iran
- Coordinates: 28°51′56″N 52°25′29″E
- Country: Iran
- Province: Fars
- County: Firuzabad
- District: Central
- Capital: Baygan
- Time zone: UTC+3:30 (IRST)

Baygan Rural District (Persian: دهستان بایگان) is in the Central District of Firuzabad County, Fars province, Iran. Its capital is the village of Baygan, whose population at the time of the 2016 National Census was 2,481 people in 733 households.

== History ==
Baygan Rural District was created in the Central District in 2024.
