= Meymand =

City in Fars province, Iran

Meymand Persian: ميمند
- City
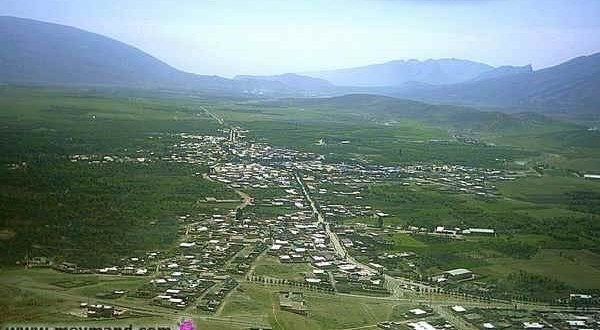

- Location within Iran
- Coordinates: 28°52′06″N 52°45′09″E
- Country: Iran
- Province: Fars
- County: Firuzabad
- District: Meymand

Government
  - Shahrdar (Mayor): Ali Akbar Hassanzadeh

Population (2016)
  - Total: 10,120
- Time zone: UTC+3:30 (IRST)
- Area code: 0713877
- Website: www.meymand.com

Meymand (Persian: ميمند) (Note: Also romanized as Maimand; also known as Meyman) is a city in, and the capital of, Meymand District of Firuzabad County, Fars province, Iran. In 1961, Meymand became a city after merging with the three villages of Meymand-e Sofla, Meymand-e Olya and Shabankareh.

Meymand is a few miles east of Firuzabad and about 70 miles (110 km) from Shiraz. Its population is almost wholly occupied with the manufacture and sale of rose water, which is largely exported to many parts of Iran as well as to Arabia, India and Java. Shafaq Cave is located nearby. The district also produces great quantities of almonds.

== Demographics ==
=== Population ===
At the time of the 2006 National Census, the city's population was 8,615 in 2,138 households. The following census in 2011 counted 9,058 people in 2,524 households. The 2016 census measured the population of the city as 10,120 people in 3,226 households.

== History ==
=== Origin ===
The origin of Meymand village is still unknown, but archaeological breakthroughs suggest that it was inhabited around 12,000 years ago. People have seemed to settle into the village almost 3 centuries ago.

=== Houses ===
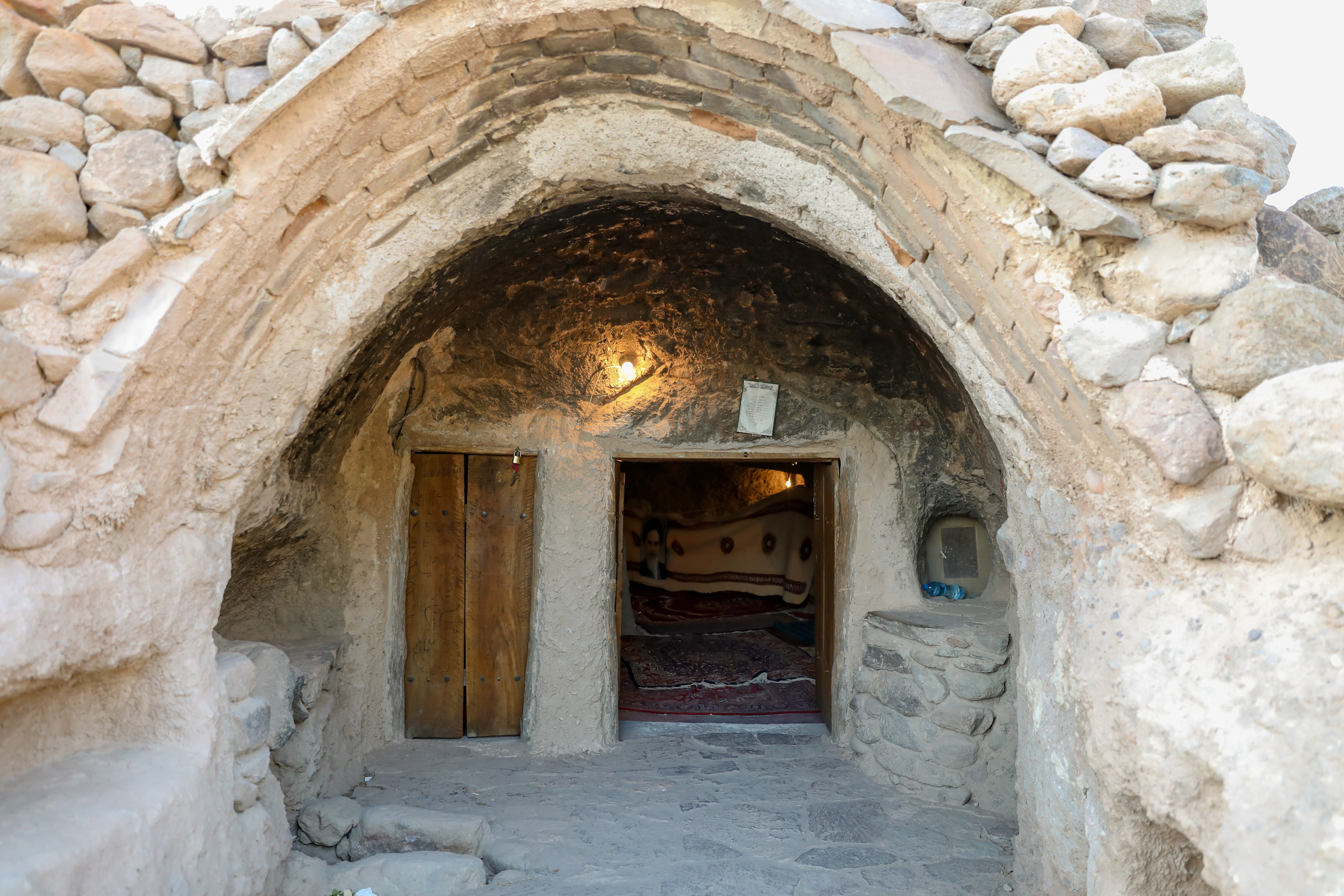
Example of the houses in Meymand Iran

The houses are made by carving mountains into a livable space, with pillars to support the mountain on top of the house. The volcanic rock which most of the houses are carved into are softer rock making it easier to carve and provides a natural insulation keeping it cool in the summer and warm in the winter. although there are some newer houses made out of wood and other materials.

== People living in Meymand Iran ==
The people living in Meymand Iran are semi-nomadic agro-pastoralist inhabitants and many are shepards.

== See also ==
- Meymand, Kerman

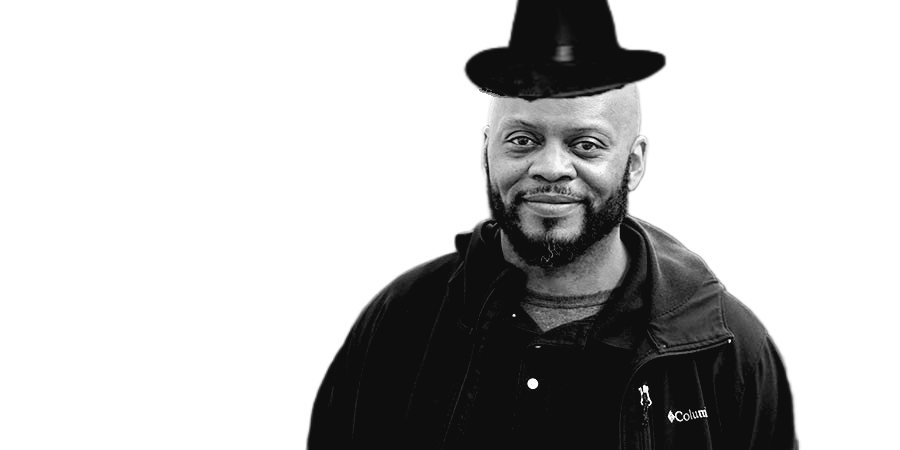
Meymand, Iran
