= Jamarr =

Jamarr is a given name. Notable people with the name include:

- Ja'Marr Chase (born 2000), American football player
- Jamarr Johnson (born 1988), American-born Indonesian basketball player
- Wesley JaMarr Johnson (born 1987), American basketball player and coach
- Jamarr Sanders (born 1988), American basketball player
- Jamarr Antonio Stamps (1975–2019), American rapper known by the stage name Bad Azz

== See also ==
- Jamar
