= Darenjan, Fars =

Darenjan دارنجان
- Village
- Location within Iran
- Coordinates: 29°24′32″N 52°20′10″E
- Country: Iran
- Province: Fars
- County: Shiraz
- Bakhsh: Central
- Rural District: Siyakh Darengun

Population (2006)
  - Total: 310
- Time zone: UTC+3:30 (IRST)
  - Summer (DST): UTC+4:30 (IRDT)

Darenjan (Persian: دارنجان, also Romanized as Dārenjān; also known as Dārengān, Dārengūn, Dārenjān-e Sīākh, and Darinjān) is a village in Siyakh Darengun Rural District, in the Central District of Shiraz County, Fars province, Iran. At the 2006 census, its population was 310, in 76 families.
