= Jowkan-e Pain =

Jowkan-e Pain جوكان پايين
- Village
- Location within Iran
- Coordinates: 30°10′48″N 53°34′55″E
- Country: Iran
- Province: Fars
- County: Bavanat
- Bakhsh: Sarchehan
- Rural District: Bagh Safa

Population (2006)
  - Total: 228
- Time zone: UTC+3:30 (IRST)
  - Summer (DST): UTC+4:30 (IRDT)

Jowkan-e Pain (Persian: جوكان پايين, also Romanized as Jowkān-e Pā’īn, Jovakān-e Pā’īn, and Jowakān-e Pā’īn; also known as Jovakān and Jowkān) is a village in Bagh Safa Rural District, Sarchehan District, Bavanat County, Fars province, Iran. At the 2006 census, its population was 228, in 56 families.
