= Ab Surakh, Izeh =

Ab Surakh آب سوراخ
- Village
- Location within Iran
- Coordinates: 31°39′12″N 50°17′12″E
- Country: Iran
- Province: Khuzestan
- County: Izeh
- Bakhsh: Dehdez
- Rural District: Dehdez

Population (2006)
  - Total: 186
- Time zone: UTC+3:30 (IRST)
  - Summer (DST): UTC+4:30 (IRDT)

Ab Surakh (Persian: آب سوراخ, also Romanized as Āb Sūrākh) is a village in Dehdez Rural District, Dehdez District, Izeh County, Khuzestan province, Iran. At the 2006 census, its population was 186, in 33 families.
