= Chahar Bid, Razavi Khorasan =

Chahar Bid چهاربيد
- Village
- Location within Iran
- Coordinates: 35°29′41″N 60°01′19″E
- Country: Iran
- Province: Razavi Khorasan
- County: Fariman
- Bakhsh: Qalandarabad
- Rural District: Qalandarabad

Population (2006)
  - Total: 21
- Time zone: UTC+3:30 (IRST)
  - Summer (DST): UTC+4:30 (IRDT)

Chahar Bid (Persian: چهاربيد, also Romanized as Chahār Bīd) is a village in Qalandarabad Rural District, Qalandarabad District, Fariman County, Razavi Khorasan Province, Iran. At the 2006 census, its population was 21, in 5 families.
