= Ab Surakh, Dezful =

Village in Iran

Coordinates: 32°22′58″N 48°24′6″E

Ab Surakh اب سوراخ
- Village
- Interactive map of Ab Surakh
- Country: Iran
- Province: Khuzestan
- County: Dezful
- Bakhsh: Sardasht
- Rural District: Sardasht

Population (2006)
  - Total: 50
- Time zone: UTC+3:30 (IRST)
  - Summer (DST): UTC+4:30 (IRDT)

Ab Surakh (Persian: اب سوراخ, also Romanized as Āb Sūrākh) is a village in Sardasht Rural District, Sardasht District, Dezful County, Khuzestan province, Iran. At the 2006 census, its population was 50, in 9 families.
