= Murdestan, Darab =

Murdestan موردستان
- Village
- Location within Iran
- Coordinates: 28°29′54″N 55°21′59″E
- Country: Iran
- Province: Fars
- County: Darab
- Bakhsh: Rostaq
- Rural District: Kuhestan

Population (2006)
  - Total: 41
- Time zone: UTC+3:30 (IRST)
  - Summer (DST): UTC+4:30 (IRDT)

Murdestan (Persian: موردستان, also Romanized as Mūrdestān; also known as Mūrtestān) is a village in Kuhestan Rural District, Rostaq District, Darab County, Fars province, Iran. At the 2006 census, its population was 41, in 10 families.
