= Darenjan, Kerman =

Darenjan دارنجان
- Village
- Location within Iran
- Coordinates: 29°20′10″N 56°51′35″E
- Country: Iran
- Province: Kerman
- County: Rabor
- Bakhsh: Central
- Rural District: Siyah Banuiyeh

Population (2006)
  - Total: 64
- Time zone: UTC+3:30 (IRST)
  - Summer (DST): UTC+4:30 (IRDT)

Darenjan (Persian: دارنجان, also Romanized as Dārenjān) is a village in Siyah Banuiyeh Rural District, in the Central District of Rabor County, Kerman Province, Iran. At the 2006 census, its population was 64, in 12 families.
