= Dextrobeam =

The Dextrobeam is a highly interactive console that enables collaborative examination of three-dimensional (3-D) medical imaging data for planning, discussing, or teaching neurosurgical approaches and strategies. The console is designed to work in combination with a 3D stereoscopic display. The console enables two-handed interaction by means of two 6 Degree-of-Freedom motion tracking devices. A set of built-in software tools gives users the ability to manipulate and interact with patients’ imaging data in a natural and intuitive way.

The stereoscopic display (a large monitor or a projector) displays volumetric 3D medical structures from patients’ multimodality images allowing groups, large and small, to gain a deeper understanding of complex anatomical relationships.

The Dextrobeam was used as a teaching tool at the following congresses and courses:

Institution	Conference/Event
Congress of Neurological Surgeons	Live 3-D Cadaveric Demonstration of Surgical Approaches, CNS 2006 & 2007
Dept. Neurosurgery, St. Louis Hospital (MO, USA)	Practical Anatomy & Surgical Education Courses, 2006 and 2007
Dept. Neurosurgery, Johannes Gutenberg University Mainz (Germany)	Minimally Invasive Neurosurgery courses (four times a year), 2004-2007
Dept. Neurosurgery, National Neuroscience Institute (Singapore)	Neurosurgical Instructional Course featuring Virtual Reality, 2006-2007; Virtual Temporal Bone Surgery Training Course 2002, 2001
Dept. Neurosurgery, National University Hospital (Singapore)	Masterclasses in Difficult Neurosurgery course, 2007
School of Health Sciences, University of Minho, Braga (Portugal)	[null Hands-on Course: Sulci, Gyri and Ventricles] 2007

The Dextrobeam was installed at the following institutions:

Medical/Research Institution	Main Use
Johannes Gutenberg University Hospital (Mainz, Germany)	Neurosurgery & Medical Education
Third Military Medical University (Chong Qing, China)	Medical Education
Advanced Surgery Training Centre of the National University Hospital (Singapore)	Medical Education
Rutgers New Jersey Medical School (Newark, USA)	Neurosurgery, ENT, Education
Prince of Wales Hospital (Hong Kong)	Neurosurgery, Orthopedics, Education

The Dextrobeam was developed and commercialized by Volume Interactions Pte Ltd. It received USA FDA 510(K) - class II (2002) clearance, CE Marking - class I (2002), China SFDA Registration - class II (2004) and Taiwan Registration - type P (Radiology) (2007).
