= Baba Kamal, Kermanshah =

Baba Kamal باباكمال
- Village
- Location within Iran
- Coordinates: 34°35′55″N 47°29′08″E
- Country: Iran
- Province: Kermanshah
- County: Sahneh
- Bakhsh: Dinavar
- Rural District: Dinavar

Population (2006)
  - Total: 254
- Time zone: UTC+3:30 (IRST)
  - Summer (DST): UTC+4:30 (IRDT)

Baba Kamal (Persian: باباكمال, also Romanized as Bābā Kamāl; also known as Bābā Kamāl-e Soflá) is a village in Dinavar Rural District, Dinavar District, Sahneh County, Kermanshah Province, Iran. At the 2006 census, its population was 254, in 63 families.
