= Sukhteh Chenar =

Sukhteh Chenar سوخته چنار
- Village
- Location within Iran
- Coordinates: 36°24′27″N 49°34′33″E
- Country: Iran
- Province: Qazvin
- County: Qazvin
- Bakhsh: Kuhin
- Rural District: Ilat-e Qaqazan-e Gharbi

Population (2006)
  - Total: 34
- Time zone: UTC+3:30 (IRST)
  - Summer (DST): UTC+4:30 (IRDT)

Sukhteh Chenar (Persian: سوخته چنار, also Romanized as Sūkhteh Chenār) is a village in Ilat-e Qaqazan-e Gharbi Rural District, Kuhin District, Qazvin County, Qazvin Province, Iran. At the 2006 census, its population was 34 across 14 families.
