= Sirizjan =

Sirizjan سيريزجان
- Village
- Location within Iran
- Coordinates: 29°16′35″N 52°00′34″E
- Country: Iran
- Province: Fars
- County: Kazerun
- Bakhsh: Jereh and Baladeh
- Rural District: Jereh

Population (2006)
  - Total: 680
- Time zone: UTC+3:30 (IRST)
  - Summer (DST): UTC+4:30 (IRDT)

Sirizjan (Persian: سيريزجان, also Romanized as Sīrīzjān; also known as Sarīzjān, Serīzjān, Sirasjūn, and Sīrīzḩān) is a village in Jereh Rural District, Jereh and Baladeh District, Kazerun County, Fars province, Iran. At the 2006 census, its population was 680 in 164 families.
