= Soru, Azerbaijan =

Soru
- Municipality
- Location within Azerbaijan
- Coordinates: 38°50′49″N 48°28′23″E
- Country: Azerbaijan
- Rayon: Lerik

Population
  - Total: 1,238
- Time zone: UTC+4 (AZT)
  - Summer (DST): UTC+5 (AZT)

Soru (Talysh: Sori) is a village and municipality in the Lerik Rayon of Azerbaijan. It has a population of 1,238.
