= Joseph and Luka Banda =

Zambian conjoined twins

- Born: 23 January 1997 (age 29); Lusaka, Zambia
- Known for: Conjoined twins (1997–2001)

Joseph Banda and Luka Banda (born 23 January 1997) are twin brothers who used to be conjoined. They were born joined at the back of the skull and faced in opposite directions. In late 1997, neurosurgeon Ben Carson led a team of 50 Zambian and South African specialists to separate the 11-month-old twins in a 28-hour operation. They did not share any organs, but shared intricate blood vessels that flowed into each other's brains. In 2001, the twins were fitted with artificial skulls to permanently close their heads. In an interview, Carson stated about the operation:

"In the end, the Bandas became the first Type 2 craniopagus twins (joined at the head and facing in opposite directions) ever separated with both surviving and both being neurologically normal."

However, a Zambia Daily Mail reporter revisiting the Bandas at 21 discovered Joseph, though able to care for himself, had not been able to attend school because of "mental challenges" that impeded his learning. He is described as "reclusive", preferring to stay within a kilometer of home, and was "not very responsive" when his parents hired an in-home tutor for him. Luka dropped out of school in the Grade Nine, and was often bullied due to the scars on his head. He is hoping to become a mechanic.

They are residing in an area of Lusaka called Chilenje South.
