= Craniopagus twins =

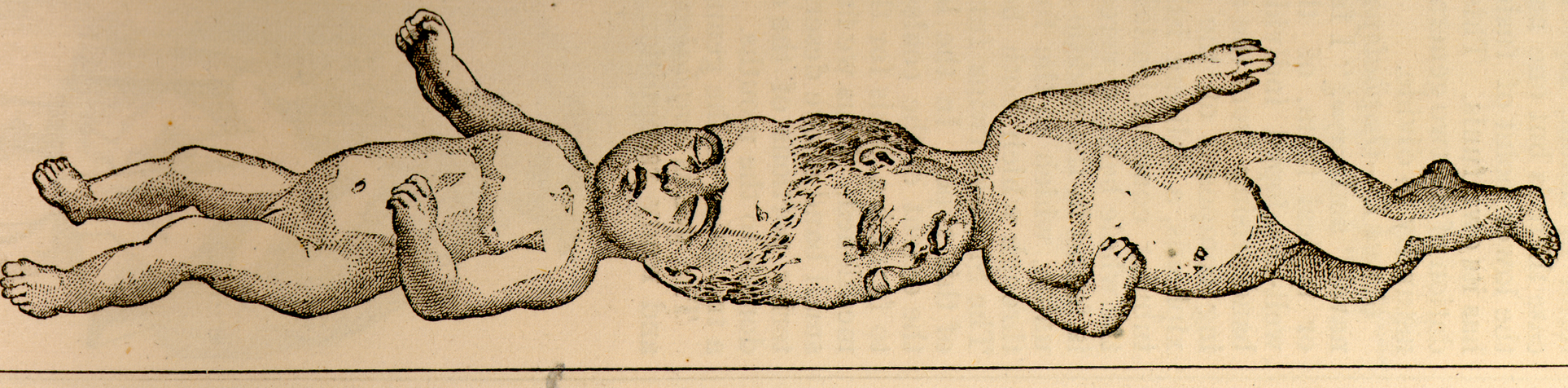
- Craniopagus twins
- Specialty: Neurosurgery, neuroimaging, medical genetics
- Usual onset: In uterus
- Diagnostic method: Obstetric ultrasonography
- Frequency: 1 in 2.5 million live births

Craniopagus twins are conjoined twins who are fused at the skull. The union may occur on any portion of the cranium, but does not primarily involve either the face or the foramen magnum; the two brains are usually separate, but they may share some brain tissue. Conjoined twins are genetically identical and always share the same sex. The thorax and abdomen are separate and each twin has their own umbilicus and umbilical cord.

The condition is extremely rare, with an incidence of approximately 1 in 2.5 million live births. An estimated 50 craniopagus twins are born around the world every year as of 2021, with only 15 twins surviving beyond the first 30 days of life. Relatively few craniopagus twins survive the perinatal period; approximately 40% of conjoined twins are stillborn and an additional 33% die within the immediate perinatal period, usually from organ abnormalities and failure.

However, 25% of craniopagus twins survive and may be considered for a surgical separation; several such attempts occur annually worldwide. Advances in neuroimaging, neuroanesthesia, and neurosurgery have demonstrated that a successful outcome is possible. Among all conjoined twins, craniopagus twins account for a mere 2% to 6%.

== Classification ==
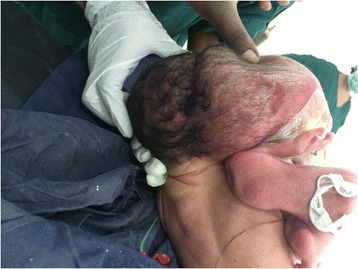
Doctor performing an assessment on conjoined infants

The first classification system was developed by O'Connell in 1976, where craniopagus twins were classified as total and partial. In the former, twins shared an "extensive surface area with widely connected cranial cavities", while in the latter, only a "limited, superficial surface area" was connected.

In 2006, Stone and Goodrich came up with a more nuanced classification system, which is the "most commonly used" system. Partial CPT was defined as "lacking substantial shared dural venous sinuses", whereas total CPT "share a large portion of their dural venous sinuses and present with pronounced brain compression, which leads to distortion within the cranium".

=== Total ===
Total craniopagus twins share a large portion of dural venous sinuses and present with pronounced brain compression, leading to distortion within the cranium. Stone and Goodrich also defined two main subtypes, based on whether the long-axis angle between the twins was angular or vertical. The angular subtype has a higher rate of comorbidities than the vertical subtype.

Vertical craniopagus calvaria is continuous and is further subdivided on the basis of intertwin axial facial rotation:

- Type 1: both children face in the same general directional axis so that the angle between twins is less than 40 degrees. These twins show relatively symmetric superior bi-parietal or vertex compressional flattening.
- Type 2: both children face opposite directions so that the deformity shows an axial rotation between 140 and 180 degrees.
- Type 3: in this variety axial rotation is intermediate between the first two types with a rotation of being between 40 and 140.

Another classification system divides total craniopagus twins into four categories:

- Frontal: twins are facing each other with the axis of the bodies forming an acute angle
- Temporoparietal: joined immediately above the external auditory meatus
- Occipital: twins are connected in the occipital lobe causing the twins to face away from each other
- Parietal: twins fuse at the vertex with the axis of the twins forming an obtuse angle; this leads to a situation where the twins share the most veins, lobes, and neural circuitry and thus is often described as one brain shared by two individuals

Occipital lobe

Having this kind of juncture means that there would be one common continuous cranium housing four cerebral hemispheres. An incomplete dural septum typically separates the flattened cerebral hemispheres. In total vertical craniopagus, the major cerebral arterial supply is usually confined to each respective twin and in some cases conjoined brain tissue may contain a larger artery. Within this category there are three smaller subdivisions that basically outline the different rotational symmetry of the junction.

=== Partial ===
Stone and Goodrich define partial craniopagus twins as lacking substantial shared dural venous sinuses, with limited surface area involvement, with either intact crania or cranial defects. It is less common than total craniopagus twins.

In partial craniopagus twins, the unions are usually frontal and less commonly occipital and vertical. Angular frontal junctions occur when the two twins are joined at any part of the forehead. Occipital twins are joined at the occipital lobe in the back of the head and vertical are joined on the top of the head and usually face opposite directions. The junctional diameter is often smaller in partial forms and occasionally an incomplete layer of bone may be present between the twins. Each child maintains independent calvarial convexities except at the common area of skull junction. The dura of both children may be intact or deficient and cortical gyri may interdigitate. Additionally, shared dural venous sinuses is usually absent, or, if it is present, negligible. These twins usually undergo successful separation and both twins may live to lead normal lives.

== Gestation and embryology ==
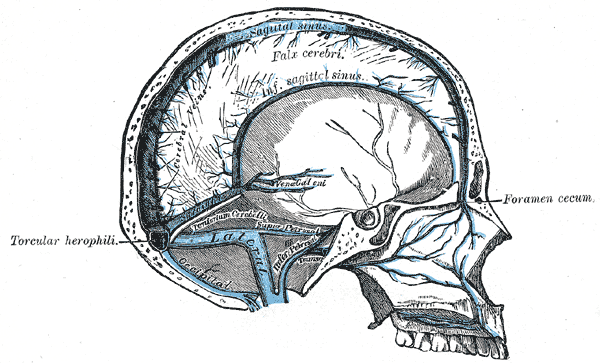
Dural venous sinus

The exact nature of how conjoined twins develop in utero remains unclear. Embryologists have traditionally attributed identical twinning as "splitting or fission" of either the inner cell mass of pleuripotent cells or early embryonic disc at 13–14 days of gestation just before the primitive streak. Some theorists suggested that conjoined twins develop as a result of the failed division (fission) of a single fertilized ovum. However a new hypothesis suggests that cranial fusion occurs between two separate embryos before the end of the 4th week of gestation. This can happen because the cranial neuropore is still open, which is responsible for the ultimate fusion and formation of the brain stem and central nervous system. Furthermore, this secondary fusion of embryonic discs could implicate that intact skin will not fuse to other intact skin, including the ectoderm of the embryo. This means that two embryonic discs could only unite in locations where the ectoderm is absent. Moreover, the fusion occurs from neural folds of two separate, dorsally oriented embryonic discs, and the union can occur only after the ectoderm is disrupted to allow the neural and surface ectodermal layers to separate from each other.

The union in craniopagus twins may happen at any portion of the calvarium. The juncture can involve either the entire diameter of the head or any portion of the head and can be positioned at a multitude of rotational angles. In fact, craniopagus twins are rarely found in a symmetrical union. Apart from this, the vertebral axes may have a straight line. Despite this, the angle of the vertebrae is the ultimate dictator in how the individuals heads actually face. The majority of twins face either the same way or the exact opposite direction.

== Medical procedures ==
=== Diagnosis ===
Conjoined twins, including craniopagus twins, can be diagnosed using standard ultrasound procedures during a pregnancy. In part because treatment of conjoined twins varies largely, many parents make the decision to terminate pregnancy due to the prognosis and quality-of -life issues. If the parents choose to continue the pregnancy, mother and babies will be closely monitored. In almost all cases, a C-section delivery is planned, often two to three weeks before the due date.

=== Separation surgeries ===
After the twins are born, parents and doctors decide whether or not separation surgery is possible. The doctors also must consider the possibility of reconstructive surgery and the social and learning issues the twins may have to face after they are separated.

Due to advances in neuroimaging, neuroanesthesia, and neurosurgical techniques, successful separation operations have become more common. Physical traits like joined brain tissue, shared arteries and veins, as well as defects in the skull and dura mater complicate a separation operation.

Neuroimaging especially plays an important role because it is imperative in surgical planning to understand the shared vascular anatomy—including the brain parenchyma, calvaria, and dura mater—because separating shared vessels can lead to thrombosis, air embolism, cerebral infarction, and hemorrhage. Technologies such as CT scans, MRIs, and angiography are used to map the shared vascular structures.

== Cases ==
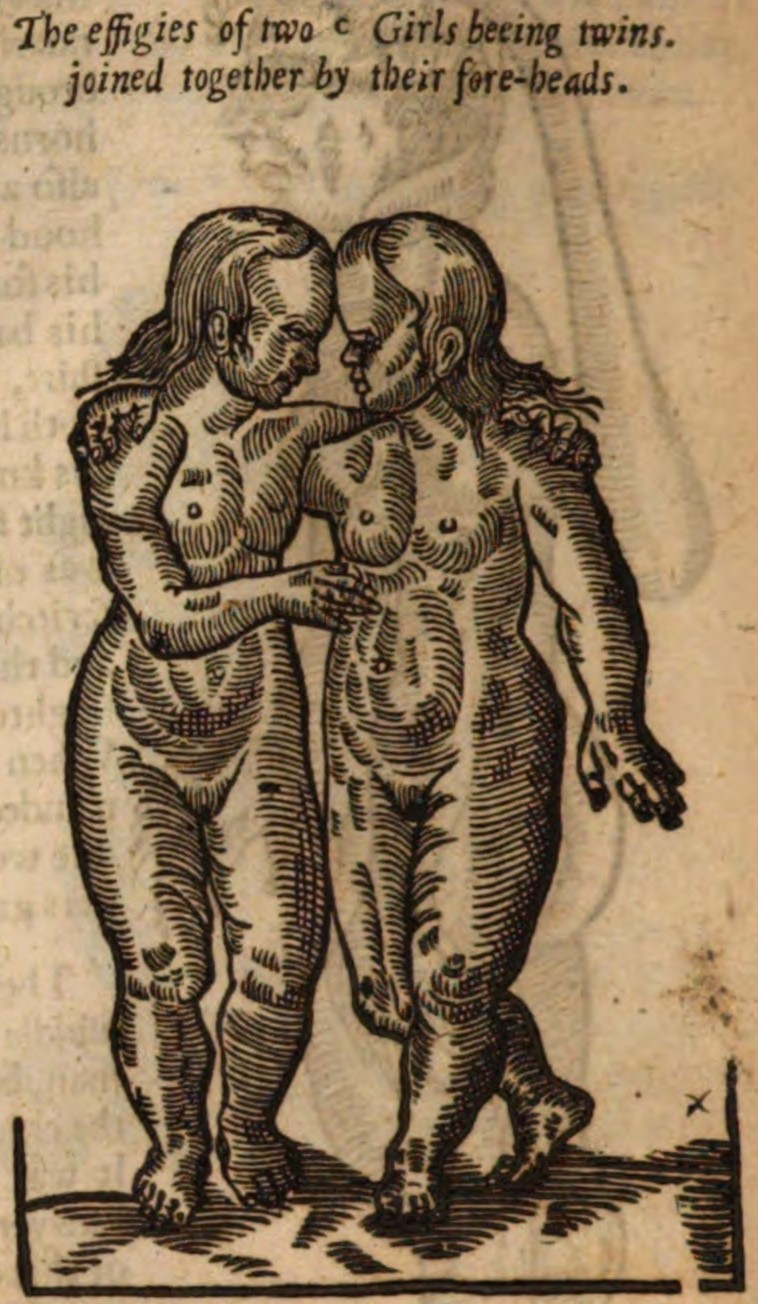
Munster's case, seen in 1495

- In 1495, a Munster reported seeing a pair of female craniopagus twins, conjoined at their foreheads, in the village Brisant near Worms. The girls died at age 10; one sister died first, the second dying from an attempt to separate her from her dead twin. They were described by Ambroise Pare in Of Monsters and Prodigies.
- Emilie and Elisabeth Stoll were born on January 17, 1912. Their parents exhibited them until their death in July 1912. Their cause of death is unknown, but they were probably weakened by the stress of travelling and exhibition.
- Rodney and Roger Brodie were born in Rock Island, Illinois, in 1951. In December 1952 a medical team led by neurosurgeon Oscar Sugar attempted to separate the 15-month old twins in a surgery that lasted 12 hours. During surgery, the doctors discovered that the twins shared the superior sagittal sinus, the canal that drains blood from the brain to the heart. This vessel was retained by Rodney Brodie. Both twins survived the surgery, although Roger did not regain consciousness and died 34 days later. Rodney recovered but suffered neurological damage; because his skull was never closed, he wore a helmet until his death at age 11. This was the first case where craniopagual twins were separated and one survived.
- Teresa (1956–2017) and Virginia Bunton of Tennessee, separated in 1956 and the first craniopagus pair to be separated with both surviving.
- Lotti and Rosemarie Knaack, who were born in Germany in 1951, were separated at age 6, with Lotti dying in surgery. Rosemarie survived until 2008.
- Lori and George Schappell, 1961–2024, are believed to have been the longest-surviving craniopagus twins in recorded history.
- Ladan and Laleh Bijani, who were born in Iran, were separated in 2003 at age 29, only to die 90 minutes apart after surgery.
- Ahmed and Mohamed Ibrahim, who were born in Egypt, were successfully separated in Dallas, Texas, in October 2003, when they were two years old.
- Lea and Tabea Block, who were born in Germany in 2003, were separated in September 2004 at Johns Hopkins Hospital in Baltimore, Maryland. Tabea died of cardiac arrest an hour after separation.
- Anastasia and Tatiana Dogaru were born in 2004 with the crown of Tatiana's head joined to the back of Anastasia's. Doctors determined in 2007 that they could not be separated.
- Krista and Tatiana Hogan, born on October 25, 2006. After a series of tests doctors determined these twins could not be separated.
- Joseph and Luka Banda from Zambia, born in 1997, were separated successfully the same year in South Africa by a team of surgeons led by Ben Carson.
- Trishna and Krishna from Bangladesh born in December 2006, joined on the tops of their skulls and sharing a small amount of brain tissue. In 2009, they were separated in Melbourne, Australia.
- Ganga and Jamuna Shrestha, born in Kathmandu, Nepal in 2000, were successfully separated by Dr. Chumpon Chan and his team from the Singapore General Hospital in 2001.
- Rital and Ritaj Gaboura of Sudan, were separated at 11 months old in 2011 at the Great Ormond Street Hospital in London. As of 2019 they lived in Ireland.
- Jadon and Anias McDonald were separated at 13 months old in 2016 in a crowdfunded operation costing $2.5 million (USD) at Montefiore Hospital in New York. Jadon appears to be healthy, but Anias is severely disabled.
- Maria Ysadora and Maria Ysabelle, born in July 2016, were successfully separated on October 27, 2018, after a five-step surgery in São Paulo, Brazil by a multidisciplinary team of neurosurgeons and plastic surgeons led by Helio Machado, with consultation from the American James Tait Goodrich.
- Safa and Marwa Bibi, born in Peshawar, Pakistan, on January 7, 2017, were separated in February 2019 during the third of three surgeries.
- Erin and Abby Delaney, born on July 24, 2016, in North Carolina, were successfully separated by a team led by Dr. Jesse Taylor and Dr. Gregory Heuer at the Children's Hospital of Philadelphia on June 6, 2017.
- Jaga and Kalia, twins from Odisha, India, were separated successfully in September 2017 at All India Institutes of Medical Sciences in New Delhi and kept at SCB Medical College for monitoring. Kalia died on 25 November 2020 from cardiac arrest while Jaga continues to live.
- Rabeya and Rukaya Islam, born in Pabna, Bangladesh in July 2016, were successfully separated after a 33-hour surgery in Dhaka, Bangladesh, by a medical team from a Hungarian nonprofit called the Action for Defenseless People Foundation led by renowned neurosurgeon András Csókay.
- Two unnamed year-old twins conjoined at the back of their heads were separated successfully in a surgery performed by Dr. Mickey Gideon at the Soroka Medical Center in Beersheba, Israel, in September 2021.
- Bernardo and Arthur Lima, three-year-old twins from Roraima, Brazil, were separated by a team led by Owase Jeelani in a Rio de Janeiro hospital. Seven surgeries were needed, the last of which alone took 27 hours. The operation was particularly notable in that Jeelani received assistance from Great Ormond Street Hospital in London via the use of virtual reality, as well as the twins being the oldest craniopagus twins to be separated.
- Neev and Nelly Kolestein, born in or around 2001, are Afro-Surinamese craniopagus twins from Suriname who currently live in the Netherlands. They are unable to be separated.

=== Tatiana and Krista ===
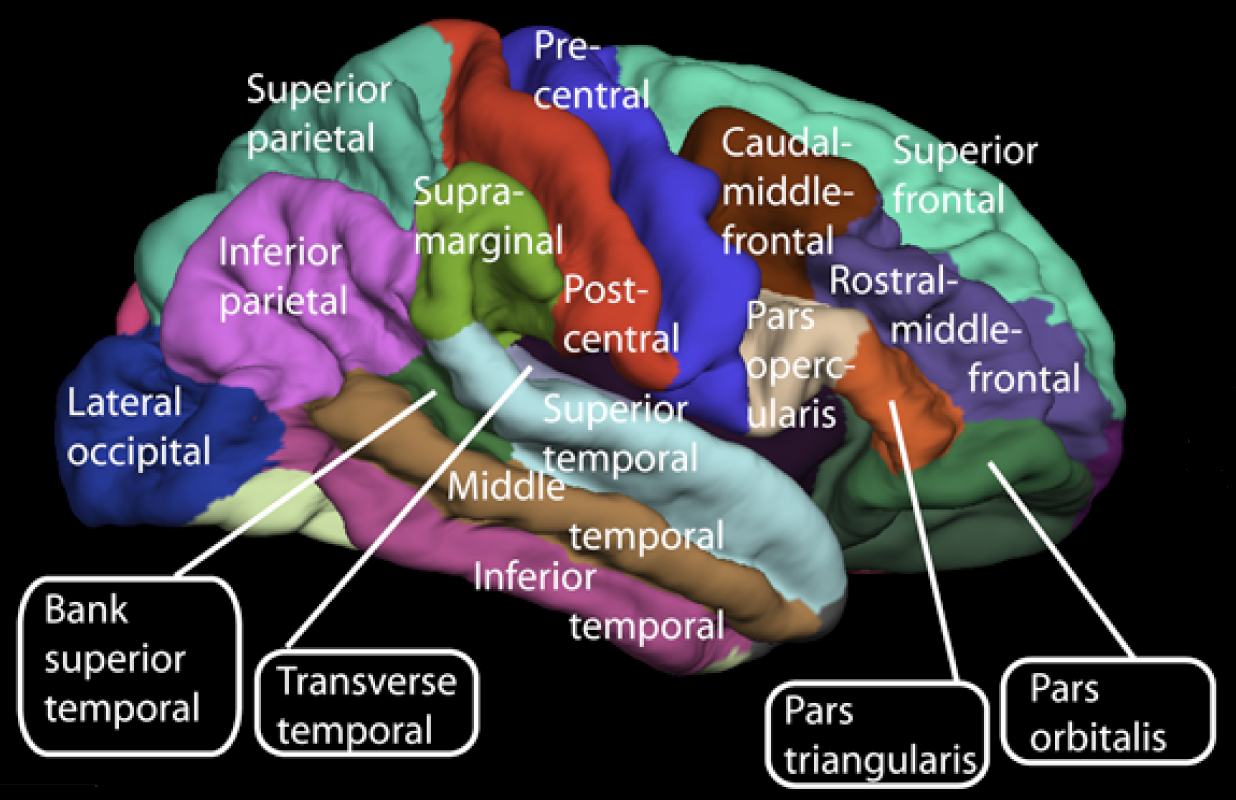
Lateral surface of cerebral cortex

In 2011, The New York Times Magazine covered a story of two craniopagus twin girls who share a brain and seem to show all different kinds of physiological and emotional responses due to their condition. Imagery revealed an attenuated line stretching between the two brains and forming a "thalamic bridge", a bridge connecting the two thalami. Knowing that the thalamus acts as a major control panel within the body, it is believed that the girls share part of this 'control panel' and so when one girl drinks the other one feels it. A more recent report on the twins was released in November 2017.

Although there is not an overwhelming amount of research surrounding how the union between craniopagus twins leads to different personality, cognitive and motor traits, there have been some studies exploring what it actually means to share a brain. In the case of Tatiana and Krista, it is possible that the twins shared some conscious thought. Studies of the thalamus' role in the brain provide neurological data that help explain these behavioral observations that these two twins experience.

Thalamo-cortico-thalamic circuits are the looped neural pathways that connect the thalamus to the cerebral cortex, and then the cerebral cortex back to the thalamus. Because the thalamus is mainly responsible for relaying sensory messages from the body to the brain, it is possible that there is a lot of overlap between the twins' sensory reception and the actual response it creates within the brain. One study examines this by studying the thalamus when it is at a persistent vegetative state that is when the patient is awake but not conscious. This study proved that the cortical activity on its own is not conscious and that all the activity between the loops of the thalamus, the cerebral cortex and the thalamus itself are all conscious actions. Another study of the thalamus reaffirms that the thalamus does not answer yes/no questions but instead acts as a mediator between different parts of the cerebral cortex and systemic sensory reception.

These loops actually may account for the relationship between Tatiana and Krista. At the neuronal level, communication is dense network of neurons linked between themselves and the coordinator (in this case the thalamus) that finally sends a message to the cortex. On top of this, there are links between the cortex that send messages back through the coordinator and finally to the rest of the body. The brain's ability to function through loops and circuits is a good model to explain why Tatiana consciously feels what Krista is physically experiencing. Additionally there is some level of synchronization between the two twins. Another study found that for craniopagus twins, their connection to each other is comparable to our normal appendages and that their bodies have obvious overlap physically and psychologically. Because most cases of craniopagus twins are unique, the research outlining general connections between craniopagus twins is limited. However, this example provides insight into the effects of a union between twins who essentially share the same sensory relay system in the thalamus.

== History ==
Conjoined twinning is one of the oldest known birth defects in history and examples with human's fascination with twins is extremely evident throughout historical literature. Although there are cases of conjoined twins dating back to as early as the 10th century, it was not until 1491 that the first case was documented.

Apart from that, Sebastian Münster’s Cosmographia universalis provides the true first account of craniopagus twins who happened to live for ten years, exceeding many expectations during that time. He describes the set of twins as being a unique malformation and a punishment from their mother's mistake. In French barber surgeon Ambroise Paré’s 16th-century book, On Monsters and Marvels, various types of "supernatural" twinning are illustrated and described as "monstrous and marvelous creatures that proceed from the judgment of God", suggesting that conjoined twins and specifically craniopagus twins were viewed as literal monsters in the 16th century.

== See also ==
- Conjoined twins
- Parasitic twin
- Twin
