= Sors, Azerbaijan =

Sors
- Municipality
- Location within Azerbaijan
- Coordinates: 38°51′32″N 48°22′34″E
- Country: Azerbaijan
- Rayon: Lerik

Population
  - Total: 735
- Time zone: UTC+4 (AZT)
  - Summer (DST): UTC+5 (AZT)

Sors (also, Soru and Sorus) is a village and municipality in the Lerik Rayon of Azerbaijan. It has a population of 735.
