= Jaydasht District =

District in Fars province, Iran

Jaydasht District Persian: بخش جايدشت
- District
- Location within Iran
- Coordinates: 28°39′53″N 52°44′23″E
- Country: Iran
- Province: Fars
- County: Firuzabad
- Capital: Jaydasht
- Time zone: UTC+3:30 (IRST)

Jaydasht District (Persian: بخش جايدشت) is in Firuzabad County, Fars province, Iran. Its capital is the village of Jaydasht, whose population at the time of the 2016 National Census was 5,524 people in 1,780 households.

== Demographics ==
=== Administrative divisions ===
Jaydasht District
Administrative Divisions
Hayqor RD
Jaydasht RD
RD = Rural District
