= Par Zeytun Rural District =

Rural district in Fars province, Iran

Par Zeytun Rural District Persian: دهستان پرزيتون
- Rural District
- Location within Iran
- Coordinates: 28°52′49″N 52°46′09″E
- Country: Iran
- Province: Fars
- County: Firuzabad
- District: Meymand
- Capital: Par Zeytun

Population (2016)
  - Total: 7,122
- Time zone: UTC+3:30 (IRST)

Par Zeytun Rural District (Persian: دهستان پرزيتون) is in Meymand District of Firuzabad County, Fars province, Iran. Its capital is the village of Par Zeytun.

== Demographics ==
=== Population ===
At the time of the 2006 National Census, the rural district's population was 6,695 in 1,428 households. There were 6,865 inhabitants in 1,696 households at the following census of 2011. The 2016 census measured the population of the rural district as 7,122 in 2,031 households. The most populous of its 47 villages was Par Zeytun, with 2,116 people.
