= Dadenjan Rural District =

Rural district in Fars province, Iran

Dadenjan Rural District Persian: دهستان دادنجان
- Rural District
- Location within Iran
- Coordinates: 29°06′54″N 52°13′40″E
- Country: Iran
- Province: Fars
- County: Firuzabad
- District: Meymand
- Capital: Dadenjan

Population (2016)
  - Total: 1,534
- Time zone: UTC+3:30 (IRST)

Dadenjan Rural District (Persian: دهستان دادنجان) is in Meymand District of Firuzabad County, Fars province, Iran. Its capital is the village of Dadenjan.

== Demographics ==
=== Population ===
At the time of the 2006 National Census, the rural district's population was 2,234 in 490 households. There were 1,798 inhabitants in 461 households at the following census of 2011. The 2016 census measured the population of the rural district as 1,534 in 463 households. The most populous of its 22 villages was Dadenjan, with 277 people.
