= Khvajehei Rural District =

Rural district in Fars province, Iran

Khvajehei Rural District Persian: دهستان خواجه ائ
- Rural District
- Location within Iran
- Coordinates: 29°04′55″N 52°33′58″E
- Country: Iran
- Province: Fars
- County: Firuzabad
- District: Meymand
- Capital: Jowkan

Population (2016)
  - Total: 6,109
- Time zone: UTC+3:30 (IRST)

Khvajehei Rural District (Persian: دهستان خواجه ائ) is in Meymand District of Firuzabad County, Fars province, Iran. Its capital is the village of Jowkan.

== Demographics ==
=== Population ===
At the time of the 2006 National Census, the rural district's population was 8,221 in 1,892 households. There were 6,590 inhabitants in 1,841 households at the following census of 2011. The 2016 census measured the population of the rural district as 6,109 in 1,951 households. The most populous of its 101 villages was Bavarkan, with 643 people.
