= Ahmadabad Rural District (Firuzabad County) =

Rural district in Fars province, Iran

Ahmadabad Rural District Persian: دهستان احمدآباد
- Rural District
- Location within Iran
- Coordinates: 28°53′08″N 52°25′14″E
- Country: Iran
- Province: Fars
- County: Firuzabad
- District: Central
- Capital: Ahmadabad

Population (2016)
  - Total: 15,441
- Time zone: UTC+3:30 (IRST)

Ahmadabad Rural District (Persian: دهستان احمدآباد) is in the Central District of Firuzabad County, Fars province, Iran. Its capital is the village of Ahmadabad.

== Demographics ==
=== Population ===
At the time of the 2006 National Census, the rural district's population was 15,919 in 3,458 households. There were 16,806 inhabitants in 4,205 households at the following census of 2011. The 2016 census measured the population of the rural district as 15,441 in 4,589 households. The most populous of its 110 villages was Baygan, with 2,481 people.
