= Jaydasht Rural District =

Rural district in Fars province, Iran

Jaydasht Rural District Persian: دهستان جايدشت
- Rural District
- Location within Iran
- Coordinates: 28°48′21″N 52°38′08″E
- Country: Iran
- Province: Fars
- County: Firuzabad
- District: Jaydasht
- Capital: Jaydasht

Population (2016)
  - Total: 10,793
- Time zone: UTC+3:30 (IRST)

Jaydasht Rural District (Persian: دهستان جايدشت) is in Jaydasht District of Firuzabad County, Fars province, Iran. Its capital is the village of Rudbal. The previous capital of the rural district was the village of Jaydasht.

== Demographics ==
=== Population ===
At the time of the 2006 National Census, the rural district's population (as a part of the Central District) was 12,079 in 2,600 households. There were 12,556 inhabitants in 3,151 households at the following census of 2011. The 2016 census measured the population of the rural district as 10,793 in 3,397 households. The most populous of its 93 villages was Jaydasht, with 5,524 people.

In 2024, the rural district was separated from the district in the establishment of Jaydasht District.
