= Meymand District =

District in Fars province, Iran

Meymand District Persian: بخش میمند
- District
- Location within Iran
- Coordinates: 29°00′27″N 52°31′33″E
- Country: Iran
- Province: Fars
- County: Firuzabad
- Capital: Meymand

Population (2016)
  - Total: 24,885
- Time zone: UTC+3:30 (IRST)

Meymand District (Persian: بخش میمند) is in Firuzabad County, Fars province, Iran. Its capital is the city of Meymand.

== Demographics ==
=== Population ===
At the time of the 2006 National Census, the district's population was 25,765 in 5,948 households. The following census in 2011 counted 24,311 people in 6,522 households. The 2016 census measured the population of the district as 24,885 inhabitants in 7,671 households.

=== Administrative divisions ===
Meymand District Population
Administrative Divisions	2006	2011	2016
Dadenjan RD	2,234	1,798	1,534
Khvajehei RD	8,221	6,590	6,109
Par Zeytun RD	6,695	6,865	7,122
Meymand (city)	8,615	9,058	10,120
Total	25,765	24,311	24,885
RD = Rural District
