= Central District (Firuzabad County) =

District in Fars province, Iran

Central District (Firuzabad County) Persian: بخش مرکزی شهرستان فیروزآباد
- District
- Location within Iran
- Coordinates: 28°45′45″N 52°34′05″E
- Country: Iran
- Province: Fars
- County: Firuzabad
- Capital: Firuzabad

Population (2016)
  - Total: 91,651
- Time zone: UTC+3:30 (IRST)

The Central District of Firuzabad County (Persian: بخش مرکزی شهرستان فیروزآباد) is in Fars province, Iran. Its capital is the city of Firuzabad.

== History ==
In 2024, Baygan Rural District was created in the district, and Jaydasht Rural District was separated from it in the formation of Jaydasht District.

== Demographics ==
=== Population ===
At the time of the 2006 National Census, the district's population was 86,208 in 18,946 households. The following census in 2011 counted 94,331 people in 23,973 households. The 2016 census measured the population of the district as 91,651 inhabitants in 28,170 households.

=== Administrative divisions ===
Central District (Firuzabad County) Population
Administrative Divisions	2006	2011	2016
Ahmadabad RD	15,919	16,806	15,441
Baygan RD (Note: Established after the 2016 census)			
Jaydasht RD (Note: Transferred to Jaydasht District after the 2016 census)	12,079	12,556	10,793
Firuzabad (city)	58,210	64,969	65,417
Total	86,208	94,331	91,651
RD = Rural District
