= Firuzabad County =

County in Fars province, Iran

Firuzabad County Persian: شهرستان فیروزآباد
- County
- Location of Firuzabad County in Fars province (center left, purple)

- Location of Fars province in Iran
- Coordinates: 28°54′N 52°30′E
- Country: Iran
- Province: Fars
- Capital: Firuzabad
- Districts: Central, Jaydasht, Meymand

Population (2016)
  - Total: 121,417
- Time zone: UTC+3:30 (IRST)

Firuzabad County (Persian: شهرستان فیروزآباد) is in Fars province, Iran. Its capital is the city of Firuzabad.

== History ==
In 2024, Baygan Rural District was created in the Central District, and Jaydasht Rural District was separated from it in the formation of Jaydasht District, including the new Hayqor Rural District.

== Demographics ==
=== Population ===
At the time of the 2006 National Census, the county's population was 111,973 in 24,894 households. The following census in 2011 counted 119,721 people in 30,724 households. The 2016 census measured the population of the county as 121,417 in 37,453 households.

=== Administrative divisions ===
Firuzabad County's population history and administrative structure over three consecutive censuses are shown in the following table.

Firuzabad County Population
Administrative Divisions	2006	2011	2016
Central District	86,208	94,331	91,651
Ahmadabad RD	15,919	16,806	15,441
Baygan RD (Note: Established after the 2016 census)			
Jaydasht RD	12,079	12,556	10,793
Firuzabad (city)	58,210	64,969	65,417
Jaydasht District			
Hayqor RD			
Jaydasht RD			
Meymand District	25,765	24,311	24,885
Dadenjan RD	2,234	1,798	1,534
Khvajehei RD	8,221	6,590	6,109
Par Zeytun RD	6,695	6,865	7,122
Meymand (city)	8,615	9,058	10,120
Total	111,973	119,721	121,417
RD = Rural District

== See also ==
Media related to Firuzabad County at Wikimedia Commons
