= Beth Usher =

American motivational speaker

- Born: Elizabeth Catherine Usher; June 29, 1979; Stamford, Connecticut, U.S.
- Died: November 29, 2024 (aged 45); Stamford, Connecticut, U.S.

Elizabeth Catherine "Beth" Usher (29 June 1979 – 29 November 2024) was an American motivational speaker, writer and artist.

== Early life and education ==
Elizabeth Catherine Usher was born to Brian J. Usher, Sr. and Kathleen "Kathy" McNamara Usher on June 29, 1979 in Stamford, Connecticut. She had an older brother, Brian, who grew up to become a firefighter with the New York City Fire Department in Harlem. Usher's parents both worked in the admissions department of the University of Connecticut. Usher was born with cerebral palsy, although the condition would go undiagnosed until her later medical diagnoses.

== Medical issues ==
Usher was diagnosed with Rasmussen's encephalitis at the age of 6, which caused frequent seizures- an average of 100 per day. She suffered from her first grand mal seizure in September 1985, after she fell from a seesaw during her third week of kindergarten at Dorothy C. Goodwin Elementary School. Her seizures were calmed by watching episodes of Mister Rogers' Neighborhood, and Usher eventually befriended the titular host and appeared on an episode of the show. The two remained friends until Rogers’ death in 2003. On February 4, 1987, at the age of 7, Usher underwent a 12-hour hemispherectomy to remove the left hemisphere of her brain.

She was only the sixth person in the nation to undergo the procedure. The surgery was performed by Ben Carson and John M. Freeman at Johns Hopkins Children's Center in Baltimore, Maryland. The chapter "Little Beth" in Carson's 1990 autobiography Gifted Hands is devoted to Usher. After her surgery, Usher fell into a seven-week-long coma and was visited by Rogers while asleep. She suddenly awoke from her coma in March, complaining that her nose itched. After recovering for two months at Johns Hopkins and another two months at the Newington Children’s Hospital, Usher later wrote a booklet for other children entering the hospital entitled "The Sun Can Come Out Again, or: How I Got Rid of Something Bad". In 1991, at age 12, Usher convinced Rogers to be that year's commencement speaker for the University of Connecticut. She later attended E. O. Smith High School and worked part-time as a teacher's aide for an after-school kindergarten program.

== Career ==
As a keynote speaker, she spoke at events for the Association for Applied and Therapeutic Humor, of which she was also a member of the Board of Directors, and the Connecticut Academy of Family Physicians. Usher and her family filmed "hours" of content for the 2018 documentary film Won't You Be My Neighbor?, although their scenes were not included in the final cut. At the time of her death, she resided between Storrs, Connecticut, Martha's Vineyard, Massachusetts, and Siesta Key, Florida. Through the non-profit organization Canine Companions for Independence she had a service dog, Gromit.

== Death ==
Usher died at age 45 of stage 4 metastatic endometrial cancer on November 29, 2024, at the Stamford Hospital in Stamford.
