= Gifted Hands =

Book by Dr. Ben Carson

Gifted Hands: The Ben Carson Story
- Author: Ben Carson and Cecil Murphey
- Language: English
- Genre: Nonfiction, autobiography
- Publisher: Zondervan
- Publication date: 1990
- Publication place: United States
- Media type: Print (paperback)
- Pages: 240
- ISBN: 978-0-310-54651-1

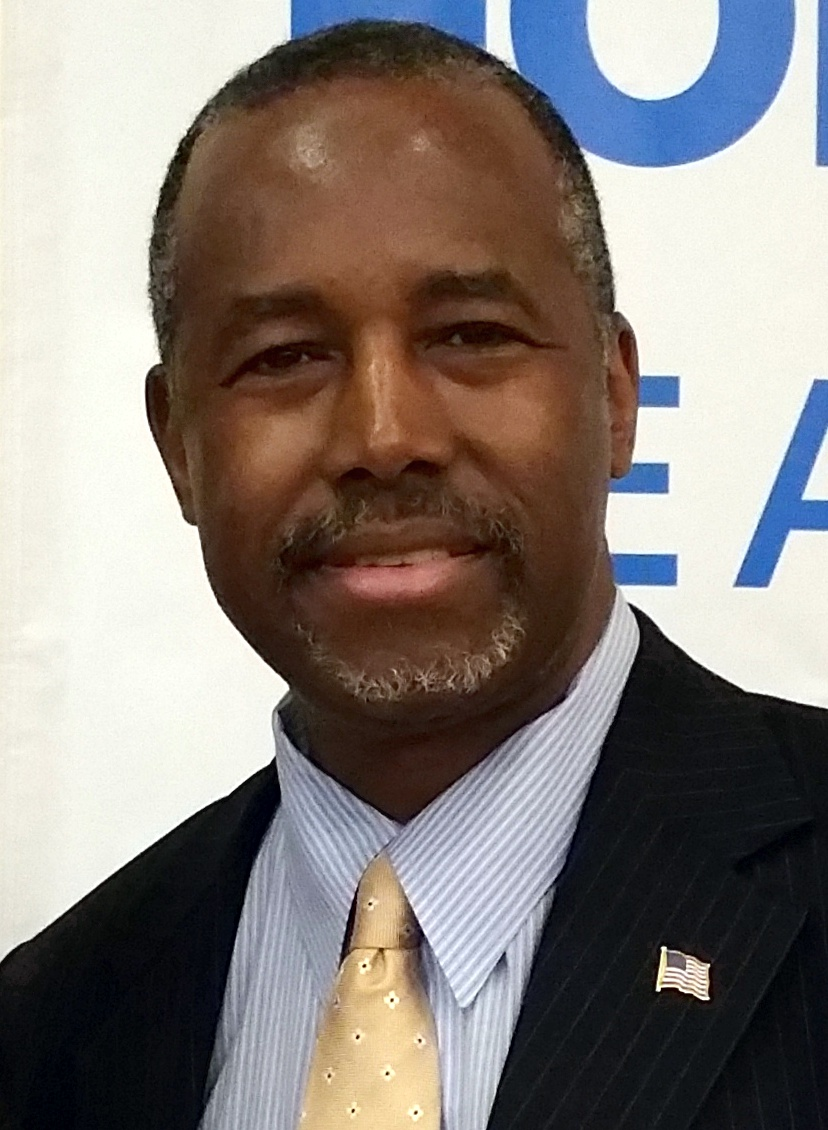
Carson in 2015

Gifted Hands: The Ben Carson Story or simply Gifted Hands is an autobiographical book about the success story of Dr. Ben Carson, a neurosurgeon and future politician, and his life going from a failing student to leading a team of surgeons in the first known separation of conjoined twins joined at the back of the head. Co-written by Ben Carson and Cecil Murphey, Gifted Hands was adapted into a film of the same name by director Thomas Carter in 2009. In the film, Dr. Carson was portrayed by actor Cuba Gooding Jr.

== Plot ==
The book is based on the real events during the life of Dr. Carson. It is written in the first-person and describes how Ben, an African-American boy from the Detroit ghettos achieves success and fame as a world-class pediatric neurosurgeon. It begins when, at age 8, Ben's father leaves the family, forcing Carson’s mother, Sonya, to raise her two sons, Ben and Curtis, alone. The Carson family faces struggles in the next years. These include both financial struggles and his mother’s mental health issues.

Carson then turns to his personal struggles in school and dealing with anger. He achieves excellent grades and enters Yale as a freshman in the premed program and continues to face challenges, including ongoing struggles for financial security and unexpected academic challenges. In his college years, Ben meets his future wife, Lacena (Candy) Rustin, with whom he shares a love of music and, eventually, commitment to the Seventh-day Adventist Church.

Carson then focuses on his medical career. He tells how he returns to Michigan for medical school, marries Candy, and then heads to Johns Hopkins for his neurosurgery residency and eventually becomes their youngest ever director of pediatric neurosurgery, in which position he continues beyond the period covered in the book. Turning his attention to his career as director of pediatric neurosurgery, Carson thinks back on key surgical advances that he made, using his “gifted hands” while relying on God’s guidance, most notably, the separation of two craniopagus German twins, the first such twins joined at the back of the cranium to both survive a separation.
