= 2016 Alaska Republican presidential caucuses =

- March 1, 2016

28 pledged delegates to the Republican National Convention
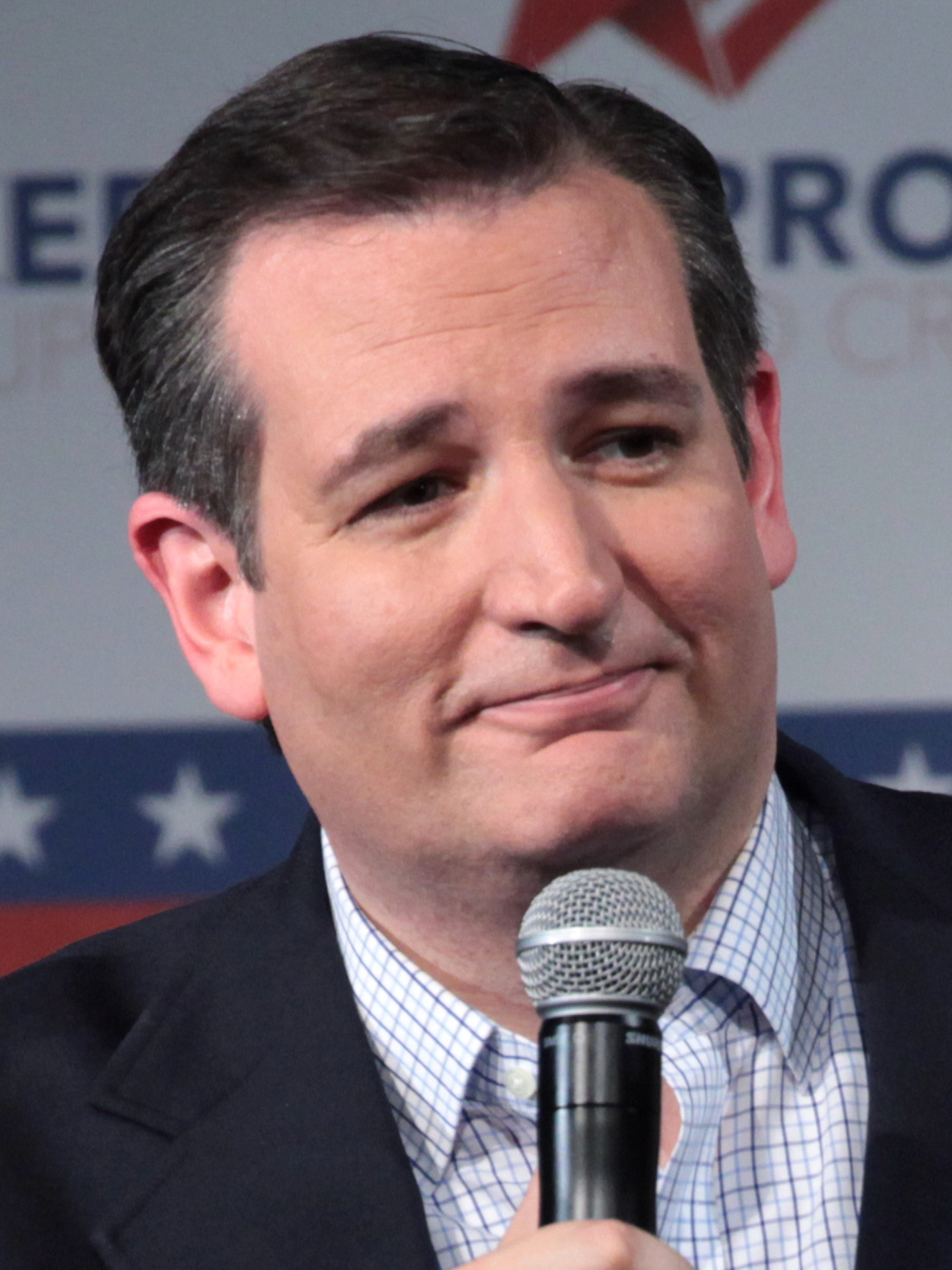

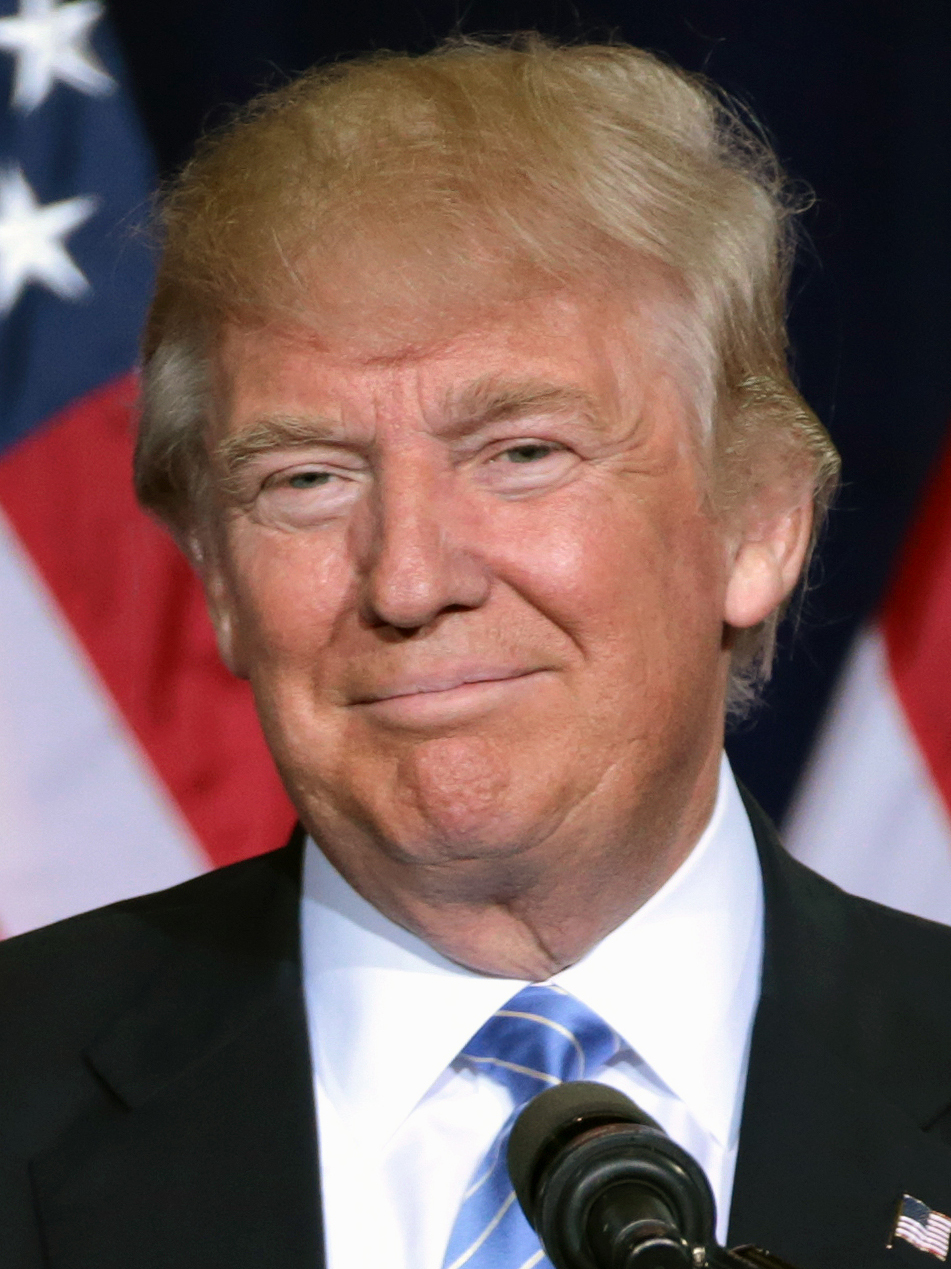

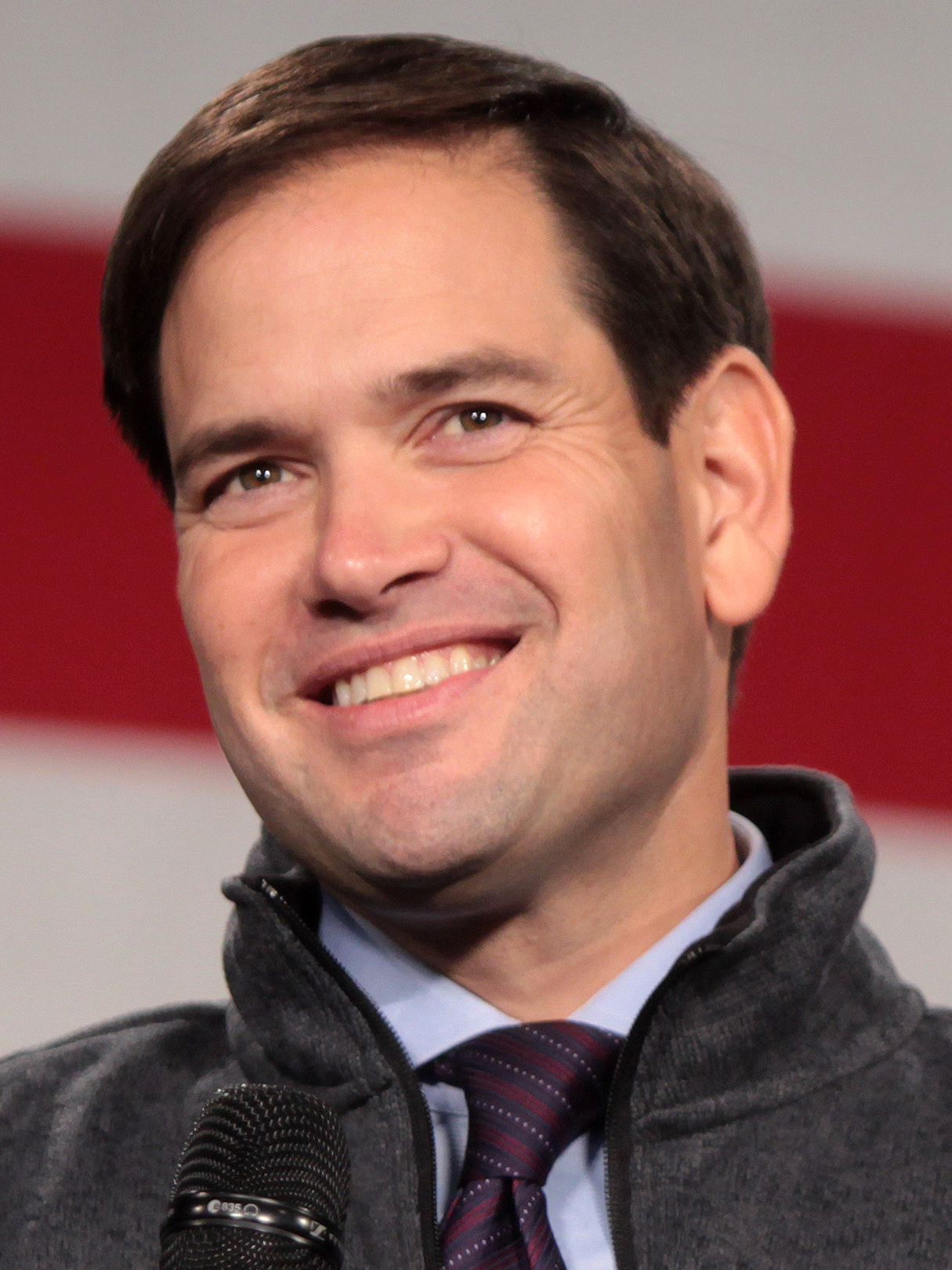

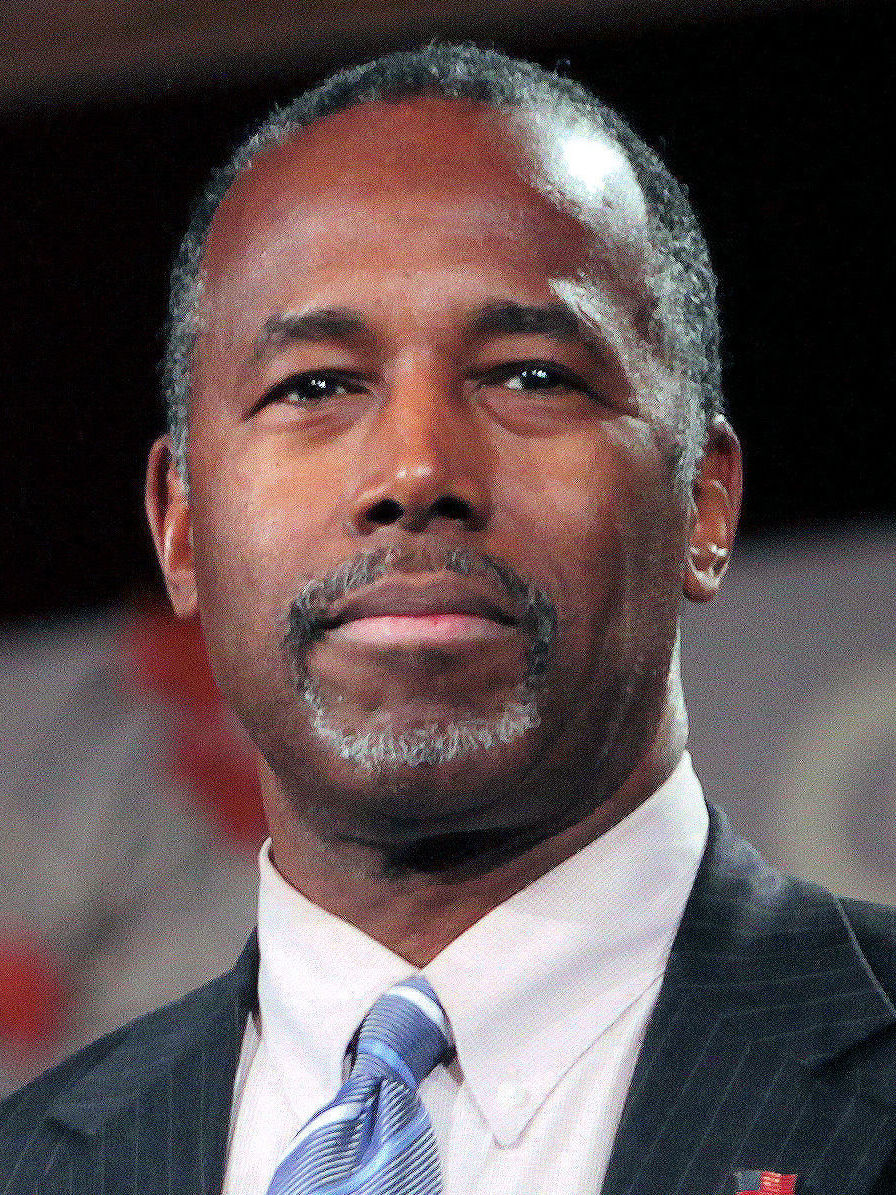
Candidate	Ted Cruz	Donald Trump
Home state	Texas	New York
Delegate count	12	11
Popular vote	8,369	7,740
Percentage	36.37%	33.64%
Candidate	Marco Rubio	Ben Carson
Home state	Florida	Virginia
Delegate count	5	0
Popular vote	3,488	2,492
Percentage	15.16%	10.83%
Results by state house district
Ted Cruz 20-30% 30-40% 40–50%	Donald Trump 30–40% 40–50%	Ben Carson 40–50%

The 2016 Alaska Republican presidential caucuses took place on March 1, 2016, as part of "Super Tuesday." Senator Cruz won the state's caucuses by less than 1,000 votes, despite Trump enjoying the endorsement of former Governor and 2008 Vice Presidential nominee Sarah Palin, the 9th Governor of Alaska.

While Cruz performed best in the state's urban legislative districts, Trump won rural precincts in the Alaska Bush. Alaska was the only state where neurosurgeon Ben Carson carried a jurisdiction over the course of the primary, albeit one of the country's least populated.

== Polling ==
Poll source	Date	1st	2nd	3rd	Other
Caucus results	March 1, 2016	Ted Cruz 36.37%	Donald Trump 33.64%	Marco Rubio 15.16%	Ben Carson 10.83%, John Kasich 3.99%, Other 0.01%
Alaska Dispatch News/Ivan Moore Research Margin of error: – Sample size: 651	January 23, 2016	Donald Trump; 27.9%	Ted Cruz 23.8%	Ben Carson 8.5%	Jeb Bush 7.3%, Marco Rubio 6.9%, Chris Christie 3.3%, Rand Paul 3.0%, John Kasich 1.7%, Other 4.1%, Undecided 13.4%
Public Policy Polling Margin of error: ± 5.3% Sample size: 337	July 31 – August 3, 2014	Ted Cruz; 16%	Rand Paul; 15%	Mike Huckabee; 14%	Chris Christie 12%, Jeb Bush 12%, Sarah Palin 11%, Scott Walker 7%, Paul Ryan 6%, Marco Rubio 5%, Someone else/Not sure 4%
Public Policy Polling Margin of error: ± 5.5% Sample size: 313	May 8–11, 2014	Ted Cruz; 15%	Jeb Bush; 14%	Chris Christie; 14%	Sarah Palin 12%, Rand Paul 11%, Mike Huckabee 11%, Paul Ryan 4%, Scott Walker 4%, Marco Rubio 3%, Someone else/Not sure 11%
Public Policy Polling Margin of error: ± 5.5% Sample size: 313	May 8–11, 2014	Chris Christie; 16%	Jeb Bush; 15%	Ted Cruz; 15%	Rand Paul 14%, Mike Huckabee 10%, Paul Ryan 5%, Scott Walker 5%, Marco Rubio 4%, Someone else/Not sure 16%
Magellan Strategies Margin of error: ± 7% Sample size: 190	April 14, 2014	Ted Cruz; 16%	Rand Paul; 15%	Jeb Bush; 13%	Mike Huckabee 12%, Chris Christie 11%, Marco Rubio 7%, Scott Walker 6%, John Kasich 1%, Undecided 19%
Public Policy Polling Margin of error: ± 4.7% Sample size: 442	January 30 – February 1, 2014	Rand Paul; 15%	Ted Cruz; 13%	Sarah Palin; 13%	Jeb Bush 12%, Mike Huckabee 11%, Chris Christie 10%, Marco Rubio 6%, Paul Ryan 4%, Scott Walker 4%, Someone Else/Undecided 12%
Public Policy Polling Margin of error: ± 4.7% Sample size: 442	January 30 – February 1, 2014	Ted Cruz; 16%	Jeb Bush; 14%	Rand Paul; 14%	Mike Huckabee 13%, Chris Christie 9%, Marco Rubio 8%, Paul Ryan 7%, Scott Walker 5%, Someone Else/Undecided 15%
Public Policy Polling Margin of error: ± 4.4% Sample size: 507	July 25–28, 2013	Rand Paul; 18%	Sarah Palin; 14%	Chris Christie 13%	Jeb Bush 11%, Marco Rubio 9%, Paul Ryan 9%, Ted Cruz 8%, Rick Santorum 5%, George Zimmerman 2%, Someone Else/Undecided 12%
Public Policy Polling Margin of error: ± 4.4% Sample size: 507	July 25–28, 2013	Rand Paul; 20%	Jeb Bush 15%	Chris Christie 14%	Paul Ryan 14%, Marco Rubio 10%, Ted Cruz 9%, Rick Santorum 6%, Someone Else/Undecided 12%
Public Policy Polling Margin of error: ± 4.2% Sample size: 537	Feb. 4–5, 2013	Marco Rubio; 18%	Mike Huckabee; 14%	Rand Paul 12%	Chris Christie 11%, Paul Ryan 10%, Jeb Bush 9%, Sarah Palin 9%, Bobby Jindal 6%, Rick Perry 1%, Someone Else/Undecided 10%

== Results ==
Alaska Republican legislative district conventions, March 1, 2016
Candidate	Votes	Percentage	Actual delegate count		
Candidate	Votes	Percentage	Bound	Unbound	Total
Ted Cruz	8,369	36.37%	12	0	12
Donald Trump	7,740	33.64%	11	0	11
Marco Rubio	3,488	15.16%	5	0	5
Ben Carson	2,492	10.83%	0	0	0
John Kasich	918	3.99%	0	0	0
Unprojected delegates:			0	0	0
Total:	23,010	100.00%	28	0	28
Source: The Green Papers and Alaska Republican Party

Delegates were awarded to candidates who got 13% or more of the vote proportionally.

=== Controversy ===
At the Republican National Convention, Alaska's floor votes were all recorded for Donald Trump by the convention secretary, even though the Alaska delegation read their votes according to the results of the caucuses- 12 for Cruz, 11 for Trump and 5 for Rubio. An Alaska delegate challenged the results as recorded. However, RNC chair Reince Priebus defended the actions of the convention secretary, saying that the delegates were bound to Trump.
