= Gifted Hands: The Ben Carson Story =

2009 American biographical television drama film

- DVD cover
- Written by: John Pielmeier
- Directed by: Thomas Carter
- Starring: Cuba Gooding Jr. Kimberly Elise; Aunjanue Ellis
- Theme music composer: Martin Davich
- Country of origin: United States
- Original language: English

Production
- Producers: Dan Angel; Thomas Carter
- Cinematography: John B. Aronson
- Editor: Peter E. Berger
- Running time: 90 minutes
- Production companies: The Hatchery; Sony Pictures Television

Original release
- Network: TNT
- Release: February 7, 2009

Gifted Hands: The Ben Carson Story is a 2009 biographical television drama film directed and co-produced by Thomas Carter, written by John Pielmeier, and starring Cuba Gooding Jr., Kimberly Elise and Aunjanue Ellis. The film is based on the autobiography of neurosurgeon (and later politician) Ben Carson, which was co-written by Cecil Murphey and published under the same title in 1990. A Johnson & Johnson Spotlight Presentation, the movie premiered on TNT on Saturday, February 7, 2009.

Gooding Jr. was nominated for the Screen Actors Guild Award for Outstanding Performance by a Male Actor in a Miniseries or Television Movie. Carter was nominated for the Directors Guild of America Award for Outstanding Directing – Television Film. The film additionally received a Critics' Choice Television Award nomination for Best Movie/Miniseries and four Creative Arts Emmy Award nominations.

== Plot ==
In 1987, Dr. Ben Carson travels to Ulm, Germany, to meet a couple, Peter and Augusta Rausch, who have twins conjoined at the back of their heads. Dr. Carson believes he might be able to successfully separate them, but realizes that he also risks losing one or both of them. After explaining the risk, Ben agrees to operate.

During the four months he spends researching and formulating a plan to increase his chances of a successful surgery, the film shifts back to 1961 in Detroit, Michigan, to a time when 10-year-old Ben Carson is doing poorly in school. His single mother, Sonya, who only has a third grade education, is distressed about both her sons’ academic failures and decides to do something about it.

First, she requires Ben and his older brother Curtis to learn the multiplication tables, and unbeknownst to them, checks into a mental institution to battle depression. When she returns, she determines that her sons are watching too much television, so she restricts them to no more than two shows per week, requiring them to read books and write reports on them. She hides from Ben and Curtis the fact that she is illiterate and thus cannot read their book reports.

Ben and Curtis begin to learn much from the world of books. Eventually, Ben's academic scores improve a lot. Within one year, Ben goes from the bottom of his class to the top. Following Ben's 8th grade awards ceremony where Ben's teacher angrily insults Ben's white classmates that they should be ashamed for performing worse than the black, less privileged Ben, Sonya enrolls Ben in a primarily black high school.

At the new school, Ben is repeatedly bullied by two students, but makes peace after outwitting them in a "yo mama" joke battle. They soon prove to be toxic, giving Ben a knife. Meanwhile, Ben harbors an irascible temper which climaxes when he physically threatens Sonya and nearly stabs one of his former bullies. Though the blade hits the buckle of his friend's belt and does not go through, Ben runs home in horror and cries out to God to forgive his bad temper, per his Seventh-day Adventist faith, allowing him to recover.

After hard work and strong determination, Ben receives a scholarship to Yale University, where he meets his future wife, Candy Rustin, who supports him in his struggles to get through Yale. After studying neurosurgery, Ben is accepted as a resident at Johns Hopkins Hospital, where he is faced with a dilemma that could end his career – operate on a dying man without permission or supervision, or let him die. He takes the risk and saves the man’s life, and is promoted by his superior afterwards.

In 1985, after Ben's mother joins the family in Maryland, Candy is rushed to the hospital where she miscarries her twins. Dr. Carson stays with her all night until the next morning when he operates on a four-year-old girl who convulses 100 times a day, performing a rare procedure, a hemispherectomy, in which he removes half the brain. Despite the drastic risks, the procedure is a success and the girl recovers much quicker than Ben anticipated, which results in his first taste of media exposure.

The film then returns to 1987 Ulm, Germany, where Ben is preparing for the risky operation to separate the twins conjoined at the head. With four months nearing an end, Ben is still unable to figure out a way to separate the twins. Then he receives an epiphany while playing billiards by himself and, accordingly, devises a plan. 22 hours into the procedure, Dr. Carson and his team manage to separate the twins, saving their lives and liberating parents Peter and Augusta. The film ends with Dr. Carson as he is surrounded by members of the press.

== Cast ==
- Cuba Gooding Jr. as Ben Carson, M.D.
  - Gus Hoffman as teen Ben Carson
  - Jaishon Fisher as child Ben Carson
- Kimberly Elise as Sonya Carson
- Aunjanue Ellis as Candy Carson
- Gregory Dockery II as teen Curtis Carson
  - Tajh Bellow as child Curtis Carson
- Scott Stangland as Peter Rausch
- Angela Dawe as Augusta Rausch

== Critical reception ==
The film received mostly positive reviews from critics. Hal Boedeker of The Orlando Sentinel said of the film, "It's the perfect movie for a country challenged by its new president to do better." Ray Richmond of The Hollywood Reporter wrote, "The film is so good that a little immodesty is not only acceptable but understandable." Among its detractors, John Maynard of The Washington Post stated, "It is a treacly, plodding affair stunted by awkward transitions and a syrupy soundtrack".

The film won the Epiphany Prize for Inspiring Television, and Kimberly Elise won the Grace Award for Television at the 2010 Movieguide Awards.
