= Candy Carson =

American author and educator

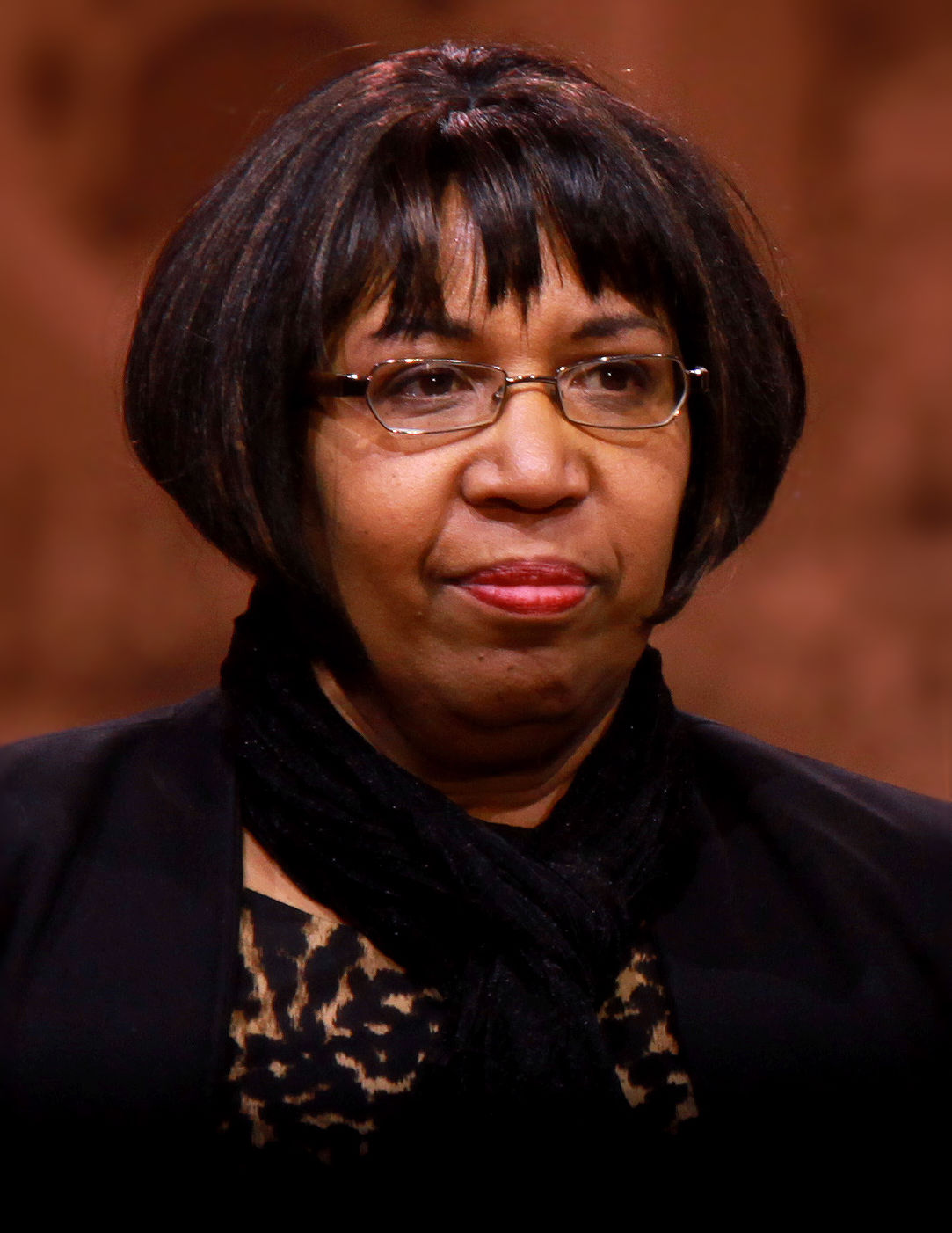
- Carson in 2014
- Born: Lacena Rustin; August 19, 1953 (age 73); Detroit, Michigan, U.S.
- Education: Yale University (BA); Johns Hopkins University (MBA)
- Occupations: Author; educator
- Political party: Republican
- Spouse: Ben Carson (m. 1975)
- Children: 3

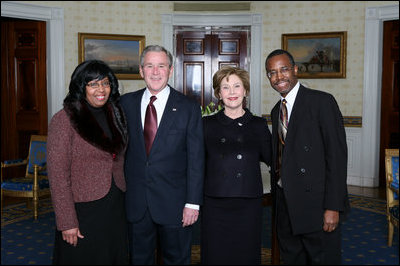
Candy Carson and Ben Carson with President George W. Bush and First Lady Laura Bush in 2008

Lacena Carson (née Rustin; born August 19, 1953) is an American author and educator. She is married to former Secretary of Housing and Urban Development and retired neurosurgeon Ben Carson, with whom she co-founded the Carson Scholars Fund in 1994. Alongside her husband, she is the co-author of four books. During his 2016 run for President of the United States, Carson was active on the campaign trail by conducting live interviews and television appearances.

== Early life and education ==
Born Lacena Rustin on August 19, 1953, in Royal Oak Township, Michigan. Carson was raised in the Episcopal Church by her mother. She graduated from Ferndale High School. Carson met her future husband, also a Detroit native, in the 1970s when both were students at Yale University.

Following her graduation from Yale, Carson attended Johns Hopkins Carey Business School where she earned her MBA.

A former concert violinist, Carson performed the national anthem during her husband's campaign kick-off. She has been a conductor for the University of Maryland Medical Center Chamber Players.

== Career ==
In the Baltimore area, Carson worked in real estate, trust administration and insurance.

== Carson Scholars Fund ==
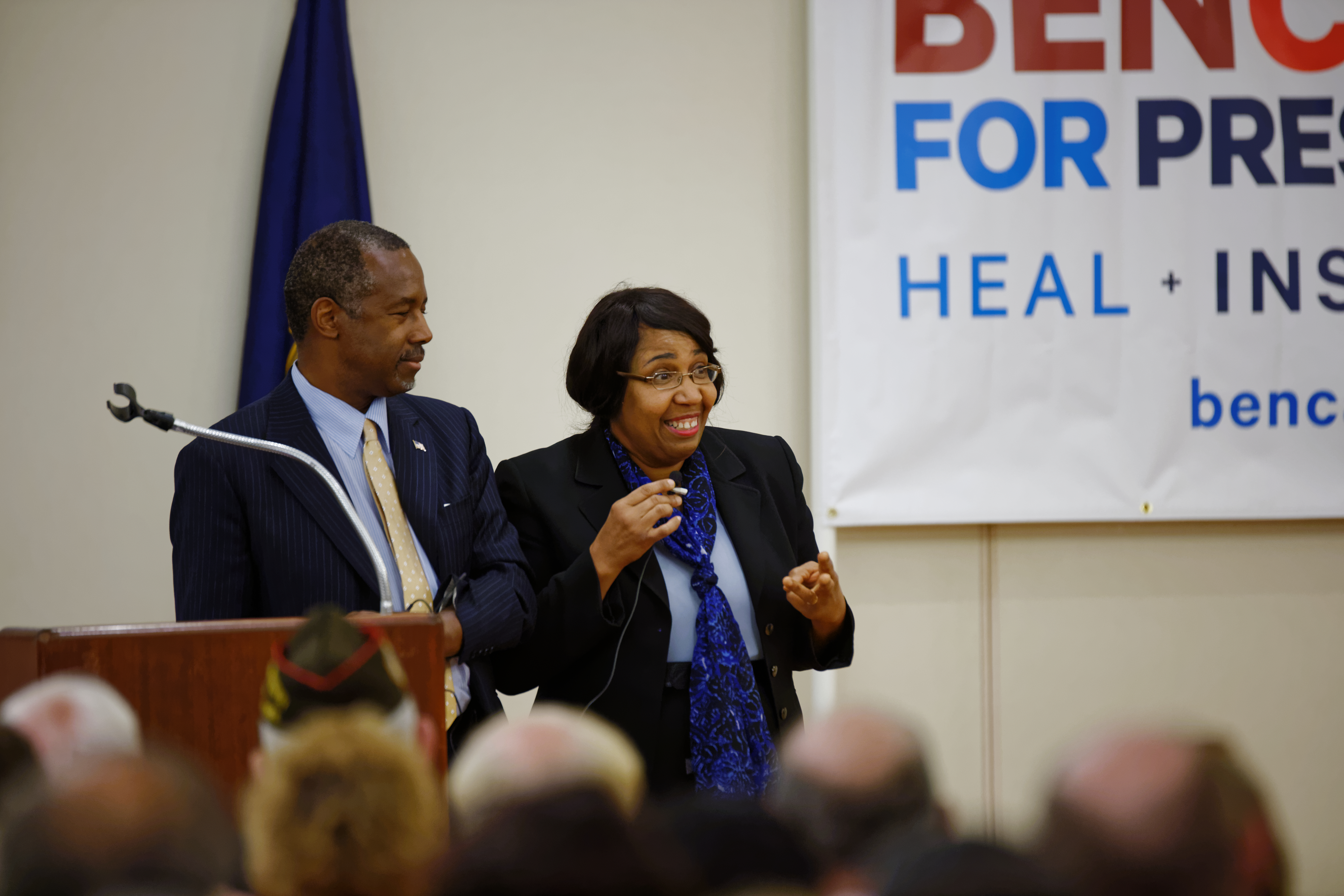
Carson alongside her husband Ben during his 2016 presidential campaign

In 1994, Carson and her husband started the Carson Scholars Fund, designed to provide scholarships to students in grades 4–11 for "academic excellence and humanitarian qualities". The foundation was started after the Carsons read that U.S. students ranked second to last in terms of math and science testing among 22 countries, feeling that their efforts could assist in encouraging academic efforts as they noted schools award athletes with trophies whereas honor students received only "a pin or certificate". Recipients of the Carson Scholars Fund receive a $1,000 scholarship towards their college education and has awarded upward of 6,700 scholarships.

Carson is the facilitator of the scholarship fund.

== Personal life ==
Carson and her husband married in 1975. Together, they have three sons: Murray, Benjamin Jr., and Royceon, as well as several grandchildren. Until 2013, the couple lived in West Friendship, Maryland, and then relocated to Florida. Both she and her husband are long-time members of the Seventh-day Adventist Church. In line with her religious beliefs, Carson is a vegetarian.

In 1981 Carson became pregnant with twins before miscarrying in the fifth month of her pregnancy. After this experience, when she became pregnant again in the following year, Carson was placed on bed rest by her doctor after the fourth month. She left her job and took this time to focus on self-care for the remainder of her pregnancy.

Carson has co-authored four books with her husband, including One Nation, which made The New York Times Best Seller list and spent five weeks at #1. Her memoir A Doctor in the House: My Life with Ben Carson was released at the beginning of 2016.

=== Books, with Ben Carson ===
- America the Beautiful: Rediscovering What Made This Nation Great. Scotland: Thomas Nelson. 2013. ISBN 978-0310330912..
- One Nation: What We Can All Do to Save America's Future. New York: Sentinel. 2014. ISBN 978-1595231123..
- One Vote: Make Your Voice Heard. Carol Stream, IL: Tyndale House. 2014. ISBN 978-1496406323.
- A More Perfect Union: What We the People Can Do to Reclaim Our Constitutional Liberties. New York: Sentinel. 2015. ISBN 978-0698195004..
- A Doctor in the House: My Life with Ben Carson. New York: Sentinel. 2016. ISBN 978-1595231246.

== Portrayal in popular media ==
Carson was portrayed by Aunjanue Ellis in the TNT made-for-TV movie Gifted Hands: The Ben Carson Story (first airdate February 7, 2009), starring Cuba Gooding, Jr. She starred as herself in the 1991 biographical documentary about her husband, Gifted Hands.

She was portrayed by Leslie Jones on the Saturday March 10, 2018, episode of Saturday Night Live.

== Expenditure controversy ==
Carson received criticism for reportedly pressuring her husband's staff to spend up to $31,000 on a dining set in his Housing and Urban Development office in late 2017. This was discovered after Helen Foster, a former HUD chief administrative officer, filed a complaint alleging that she was demoted from her position because she refused to spend more than the legal $5,000 limit for office redecoration. The HUD inspector general found no evidence of undue influence by Mrs. Carson on any staffer. However, the Government Accountability Office ruled that, in making unauthorized purchases of a dishwasher and furniture for Ben Carson's office, HUD violated the law.
