= John M. Freeman =

American physician

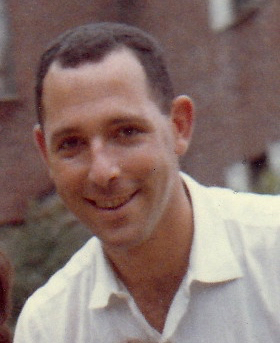
- Freeman in 1962.
- Born: John Mark Freeman; January 11, 1933; Brooklyn, New York, U.S.
- Died: January 3, 2014 (aged 80); Baltimore, Maryland, U.S.
- Education: Amherst College; Johns Hopkins Medical School
- Known for: Ketogenic diet Hemispherectomy
- Spouse: Elaine Kaplan Freeman (m. 1956)
- Children: Andrew; Jennifer; Joshua
- Scientific career
- Fields: Pediatric Neurology
- Workplaces: Walter Reed Army Medical Center; Stanford University; Johns Hopkins Hospital

John Mark Freeman (January 11, 1933 – January 3, 2014) was an American pediatric neurologist specializing in epilepsy. He is known for bringing two long-abandoned treatments for pediatric epilepsy back into popular use. One, the ketogenic diet, is a carefully managed, low-carbohydrate high-fat diet plan that reduces the incidence of seizures in children during and after its use, and the other, the hemispherectomy, is a drastic surgical procedure in which part or all of one highly seizure-prone hemisphere of the brain is removed to alleviate severe epilepsy.

== Early life ==
Freeman was born in Brooklyn, New York, the son of Florence (née Kann) and Leon Freeman, and raised in Great Neck, New York. He graduated from Deerfield Academy in Massachusetts in 1950 and from Amherst College in 1954.

== Medical career ==
Freeman received his M.D. from Johns Hopkins School of Medicine and did his internship and residency there from 1958 to 1961. With a training fellowship from the National Institutes of Health, he trained in pediatric neurology under Dr. Sidney Carter at the Columbia University Medical Center from 1961 to 1964 and served at the U.S. Army's Walter Reed Army Institute of Research from 1964 to 1966. He was a faculty member at Stanford University from 1966 to 1969. In 1969, he returned to Johns Hopkins Hospital as the founding head of the Pediatric Neurology Service and head of the Hopkins Birth Defects Treatment Center, and assumed leadership of the pediatric epilepsy clinic in 1972. He served as the head of those divisions until 1990, becoming a full professor of pediatrics and neurology along the way, and in 1991 he became the first Lederer Professor of Pediatric Epilepsy at Hopkins and director of the Pediatric Epilepsy center, which was named in his honor.

Freeman advocated for the use of two treatments for pediatric epilepsy that had gone unused for decades: the ketogenic diet and the hemispherectomy. The ketogenic diet is a very carefully controlled diet regimen that is high in fat and low in carbohydrates and has been shown to reduce epilepsy symptoms in children. It was developed in 1921 but fell into disuse when anticonvulsant drugs came into widespread use in the 1940s and -50s. When Freeman returned to Hopkins in 1969, the diet was being used on only a few patients. Freeman revived the diet for wider use on children for whom multiple medicines were ineffective. According to Guy McKhann, the founding director of the Hopkins Department of Neurology, Freeman effected the "resurrection" of the diet "virtually all by himself, against great skepticism and opposition." In 1994, Freeman was contacted by Jim Abrahams, a movie director whose son, Charlie, was suffering from epilepsy that had not responded to anticonvulsants. Charlie's epilepsy was cured on the ketogenic diet, and the story of his cure was the inspiration for the film ...First Do No Harm. Abrahams founded The Charlie Foundation To Help Cure Pediatric Epilepsy, which is now known as The Charlie Foundation for Ketogenic Therapies.

The hemispherectomy, the removal of part or all of one of the hemispheres of the brain, had also fallen almost completely out of use after its development in the 1920s, and it was reintroduced under Freeman when he returned to Hopkins. It was used when patients suffered from any of three conditions—Rasmussen's encephalitis, irregular brain development or stroke—and had failed to respond to less-drastic treatments. The technique was used and to some degree brought to public awareness by neurosurgeon Ben Carson in the 1980s. According to Carson, Freeman "helped work out many of the techniques and problems associated with the cerebral hemispherectomy."

== Personal life ==
Freeman and his wife Elaine (née Kaplan) met in 1954 when she was an undergraduate at Goucher College and he a medical student at Johns Hopkins Medical School. They married in 1956 and both worked at Johns Hopkins for decades. They had two sons and one daughter: Andrew, Joshua and Jennifer.

== Awards ==
Freeman received in 1993 the Lennox Award and in 2001 the Penry Award of the American Epilepsy Society (AES) as well as the Lifetime Achievement Award of the Epilepsy Foundation and the Hower Award of the Child Neurology Society in 2004.

== Bibliography ==
- (2011) "Ketogenic Diets: Treatments for Epilepsy and Other Disorders" (5th Edition), Demos Health. ISBN 978-1-936303-10-6
- (2007) "Looking Back: A Career in Childhood Neurology", BookSurge Publishing. ISBN 978-1-4196-6889-0
- (1994) "The Epilepsy Diet Treatment: : An Introduction to The Ketogenic Diet", Johns Hopkins University Press. ISBN 978-0-939957-64-4
- (1997) "Seizures and Epilepsy in Childhood: A Guide for Parents", Johns Hopkins University Press. ISBN 978-0-8018-5498-9
- (1987) "Tough Decisions: A Casebook in Medical Ethics", Oxford University Press. ISBN 978-0-19-504255-9
- (1974) The practical management of meningomyelocele", University Park Press. ISBN 978-0-8391-0639-5
