= Ben Carson =

American neurosurgeon and government official (born 1951)

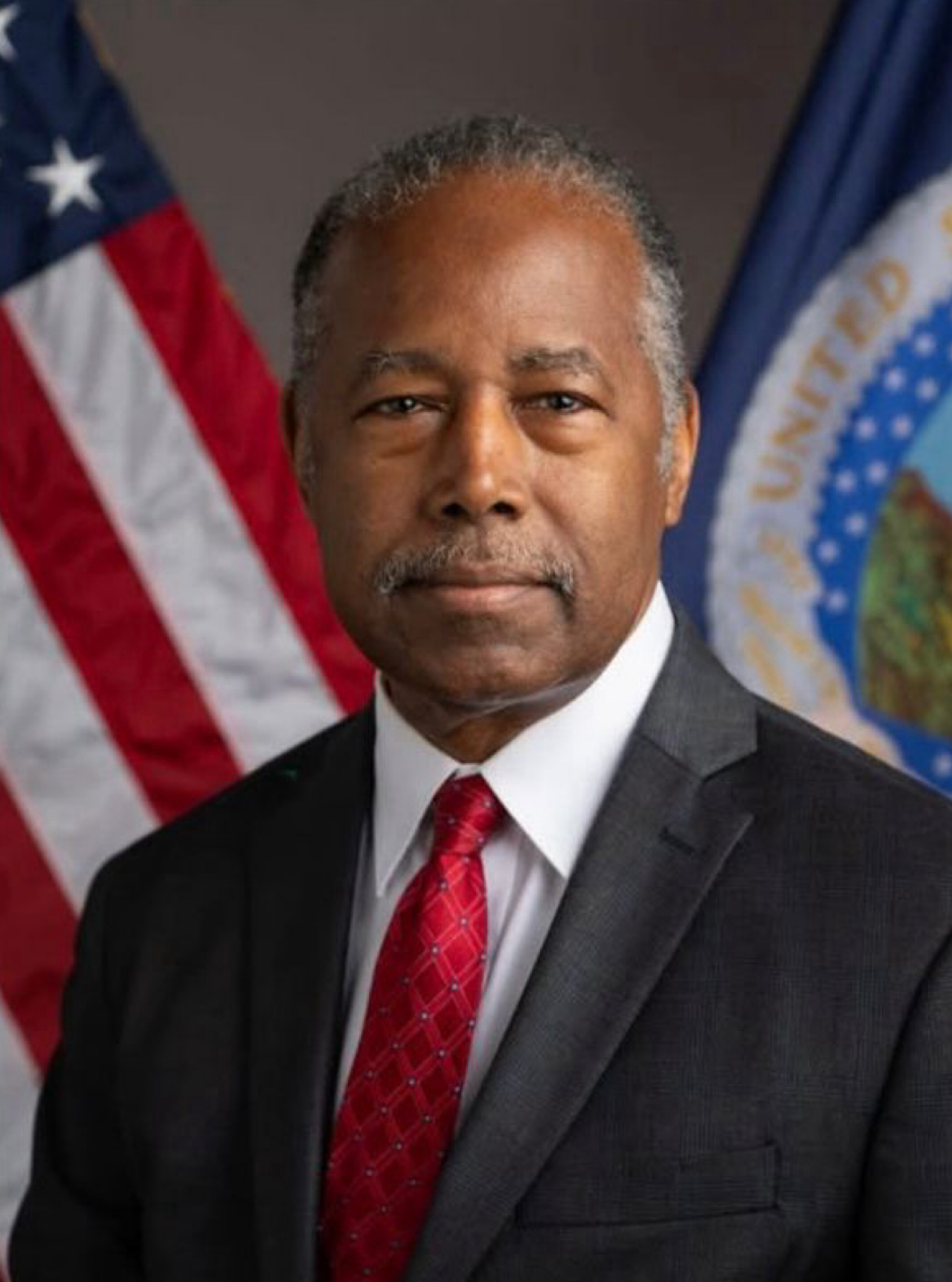
- Official portrait, 2025

National Advisor for Nutrition, Health, and Housing
- Incumbent
- Assumed office September 24, 2025
- President: Donald Trump
- Secretary: Brooke Rollins
- Preceded by: Position established

17th United States Secretary of Housing and Urban Development
- In office March 2, 2017 – January 20, 2021
- President: Donald Trump
- Deputy: Pam Patenaude; Brian D. Montgomery
- Preceded by: Julian Castro
- Succeeded by: Marcia Fudge

Personal details
- Born: Benjamin Solomon Carson; September 18, 1951 (age 75) Detroit, Michigan, U.S.
- Party: Republican (1981–1999, since 2014)
- Other political affiliations: Democratic (before 1981); Independent (1999–2014)
- Spouse: Candy Rustin (m. 1975)
- Children: 3
- Education: Yale University (BA); University of Michigan (MD)
- Awards: Presidential Medal of Freedom (2008); Spingarn Medal (2006)
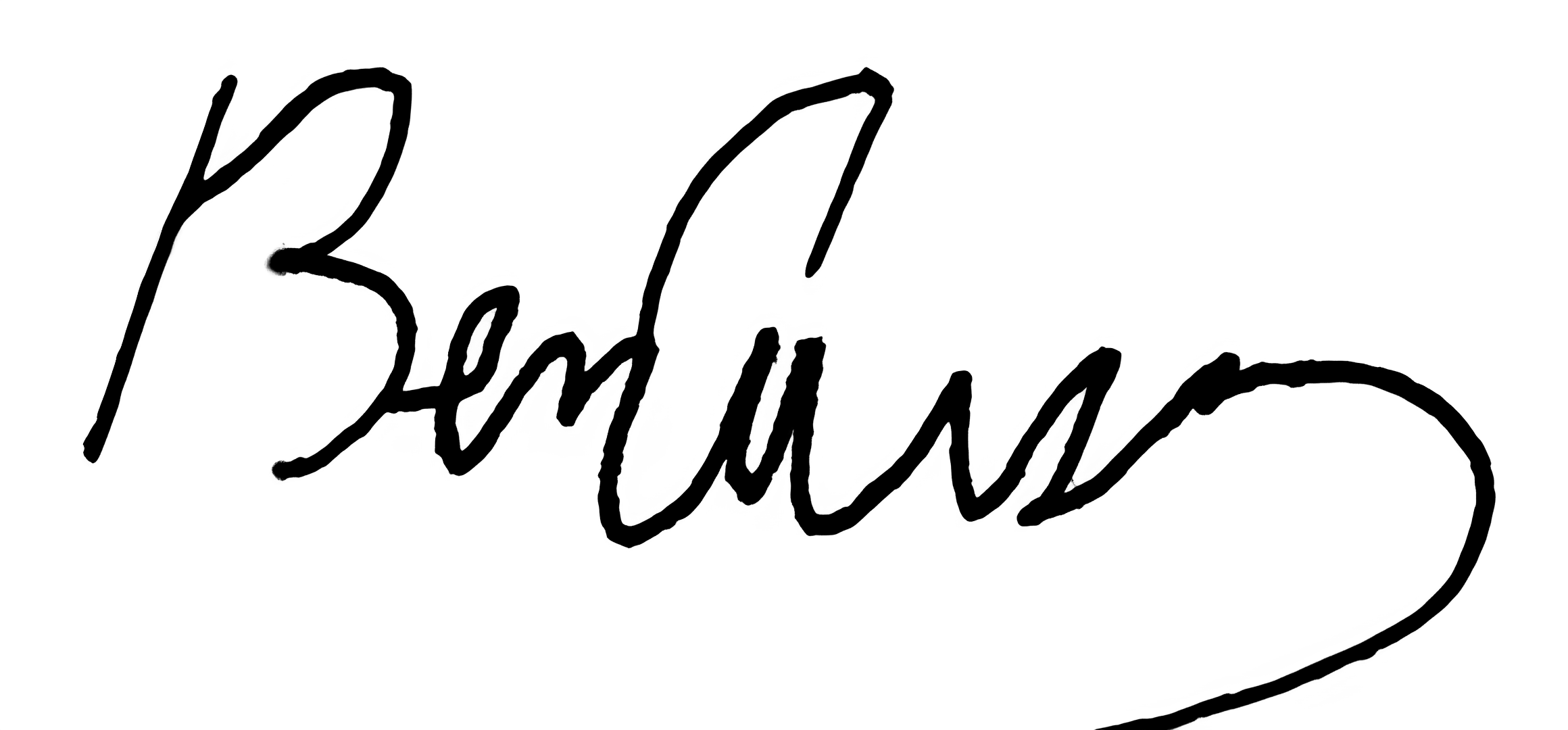
- Signature
- Medical career
- Profession: Neurosurgeon
- Institutions: Johns Hopkins School of Medicine; National Academy of Medicine
- Sub-specialties: Pediatric neurosurgery Achondroplasia; Craniosynostosis; Epilepsy; Trigeminal neuralgia
- Research: Hemispherectomy; Conjoined twins separation

Benjamin Solomon Carson Sr. (born September 18, 1951) is an American retired neurosurgeon, academic, author, and government official serving as the National Nutrition Advisor at the Department of Agriculture since 2025. A member of the Republican Party, he served as the 17th United States Secretary of Housing and Urban Development from 2017 to 2021.

Carson became the youngest chief of pediatric neurosurgery in the United States in 1984, when he took the job at the Johns Hopkins Children's Center at age 33. In 1987, he gained fame for leading a team of surgeons in the first-known separation of conjoined twins joined at the back of the head. He performed the first successful neurosurgical procedure on a fetus inside the womb, developed new methods to treat brain-stem tumors, and revitalized hemispherectomy techniques for controlling seizures. He has written more than 100 neurosurgical publications. He retired from medicine in 2013; at the time, he was professor of neurosurgery, oncology, plastic surgery, and pediatrics at the Johns Hopkins School of Medicine.

Carson gained national fame among political conservatives after delivering a speech at the 2013 National Prayer Breakfast that was perceived as critical of the policies of President Barack Obama. After widespread speculation about a presidential run, Carson announced his campaign for the 2016 Republican nomination for president in May 2015. Carson performed strongly in early polls and was considered a frontrunner for the nomination in fall 2015, but did poorly in the primaries and withdrew from the race after Super Tuesday. He subsequently endorsed Donald Trump, who as president nominated him to be secretary of Housing and Urban Development. He was confirmed by the United States Senate, 58–41, on March 2, 2017.

Carson has received numerous honors for his neurosurgery work, including more than 70 honorary doctorate degrees and numerous national merit citations. In 2001, he was named by CNN and Time magazine as one of the nation's 20 foremost physicians and scientists and was named by the Library of Congress as one of 89 "Living Legends" on its 200th anniversary. In 2008, Carson was bestowed the Presidential Medal of Freedom, the highest civilian award in the United States. In 2010, he was elected to the National Academy of Medicine. He was the subject of the 2009 biographical television film Gifted Hands: The Ben Carson Story, in which he was portrayed by Cuba Gooding Jr.

== Early life and education ==
Carson's parents were Robert Solomon Carson Jr. (1914–1992), a World War II U.S. Army veteran, and Sonya Carson (née Copeland, 1928–2017). Both from large families in rural Georgia, Carson's parents met and married while living in rural Tennessee, when his mother was 13 and his father 28. After Robert's completion of military service, they moved from Chattanooga, Tennessee, to Detroit, Michigan, where they lived in a large house in the Indian Village neighborhood. Carson's father, a Baptist minister, worked in a Cadillac automobile plant. His older brother, Curtis, was born in 1949, when his mother was 20. In 1950, Carson's parents purchased a new 733-square-foot single-family detached home on Deacon Street in the Boynton neighborhood of southwest Detroit, where Carson was born on September 18, 1951.

Carson's Detroit Public Schools education began in 1956 with kindergarten at the Fisher School and continued through first, second, and the first half of third grade, during which time he was an average student. When Carson was five years old, his mother learned that his father had a prior family and had not divorced his first wife. In 1959, when he was eight, his parents separated and he moved with his mother and brother to live for two years with his mother's Seventh-day Adventist older sister and brother-in-law in multi-family dwellings in the Dorchester and Roxbury neighborhoods of Boston. In Boston, Carson's mother attempted suicide, had several psychiatric hospitalizations for depression, and for the first time began working outside the home, as a domestic worker, while Carson and his brother attended a two-classroom school at the Berea Seventh-day Adventist church where two teachers taught eight grades, and the vast majority of time was spent singing songs and playing games.

In 1961, at the age of 10, Carson moved with his mother and brother back to southwest Detroit, where they lived in a multi-family dwelling in a primarily white neighborhood, Springwells Village, while renting out their house on Deacon Street, which his mother had received in her divorce settlement. When they returned to Detroit public schools, Carson and his brother's academic performance initially lagged far behind their new classmates, having, according to Carson, "essentially lost a year of school" by attending the small Seventh-day Adventist parochial school in Boston, but they both improved when their mother limited their time watching television and required them to read and write book reports on two library books per week. Carson attended the predominantly white Higgins Elementary School for fifth and sixth grades and the predominantly white Wilson Junior High School for seventh and the first half of eighth grade. In 1965, at the age of 13, he moved with his mother and brother back to their house on Deacon Street. He attended the predominantly black Hunter Junior High School for the second half of eighth grade. At the age of eight, Carson dreamt of becoming a missionary doctor, but five years later he aspired to the lucrative lifestyles of psychiatrists portrayed on television, and his brother bought him a subscription to Psychology Today for his 13th birthday.

=== High school ===
By grade 9, the family's financial situation had improved. His mother surprised neighbors by paying cash to buy a new Chrysler car, and the only government assistance they still relied on was food stamps. Carson attended the predominantly black Southwestern High School for grades nine through twelve, graduating third in his class academically. In high school, he played the euphonium in band and participated in forensics (public speaking), chess club, and the U.S. Army Junior Reserve Officers' Training Corps (JROTC) program where he reached its highest rank—cadet colonel. Carson served as a laboratory assistant in the high school's biology, chemistry, and physics school laboratories beginning in grades 10, 11, and 12, respectively, and worked as a biology laboratory assistant at Wayne State University the summer between grades 11 and 12.

In his book Gifted Hands, Carson relates that as a youth, he had a violent temper. "As a teenager, I would go after people with rocks, and bricks, and baseball bats, and hammers", Carson told NBC's Meet the Press in October 2015. He said he once tried to hit his mother on the head with a hammer over a clothing dispute, while in the ninth grade he tried to stab a friend who had changed the radio station. Fortunately, the blade broke in his friend's belt buckle. Carson said the intended victim, whose identity he wants to protect, was a classmate, a friend, or a close relative. After this incident, Carson said he began reading the Book of Proverbs and applying verses on anger. As a result, he states he "never had another problem with temper". In his various books and at campaign events, he repeated these stories and said he once attacked a schoolmate with a combination lock. Nine friends, classmates, and neighbors who grew up with him told CNN in 2015 they did not remember the anger or violence he has described. In response, Carson posted on Facebook a 1997 Parade magazine issue, in which his mother verified the stabbing incident. He then questioned the extent of the effort CNN had exerted in the investigation.

Carson has said that he protected white students in a biology lab after a race riot broke out at his high school in response to the assassination of Martin Luther King Jr. in 1968. The Wall Street Journal confirmed the riot but could not find anyone who remembered Carson sheltering white students.

=== College ===
He wanted to attend college farther away than his brother who was at the University of Michigan. Carson says he narrowed his college choices to Harvard or Yale but could only afford the $10 application fee to apply for only one of them. He said he decided to apply to Yale after seeing a team from Yale defeat a team from Harvard on the G.E. College Bowl television show. (Note: Attributed to multiple sources:) Carson was accepted by Yale and offered a full scholarship covering tuition, room and board. In 1973, Carson graduated with a Bachelor of Arts degree in psychology from Yale "with a fairly respectable grade point average although far from the top of the class".

Carson does not say in his books whether he received a college student deferment during the Vietnam War. He does say that his older brother, then a student at the University of Michigan, received a low number (26) in the first draft lottery in 1969 and was able to enlist in the Navy for four years instead of being drafted, whereas he received a high number (333) in the second draft lottery in 1970. Carson said he would have readily accepted his responsibility to fight had he been drafted, but he "identified strongly with the anti-war protesters and the revolutionaries" and enthusiastically voted for anti-war Democratic presidential candidate George McGovern in 1972. In his book, America the Beautiful (2012), Carson said, "The Vietnam War was, in retrospect, not a noble conflict. It brought shame to our nation because of both the outcome and the cause."

In the summers after he graduated from high school until his second year in medical school, Carson worked at a variety of jobs: as a clerk in the payroll office of Ford Motor Company, supervisor of a six-person crew picking up trash along the highway under a federal jobs program for inner-city students, a clerk in the mailroom of Young & Rubicam Advertising, assembling fender parts and inspecting back window louvers on the assembly line at Chrysler, a crane operator at Sennett Steel, and finally a radiology technician taking X-rays. At Yale, Carson had a part-time job on campus as a student police aide.

In his autobiography, Carson said he had been offered a scholarship to West Point. Cadets receive a free education and room and board in exchange for a commitment to serve in the military for at least five years after graduation. Carson also said the University of Michigan had offered him a scholarship. His staff later said the described scenario was similar to that of West Point, as he never actually applied for entry to the University of Michigan.

In his autobiography, Gifted Hands, Carson recounted that exams for a Yale psychology course he took his junior year, "Perceptions 301", were inexplicably burned, forcing students to retake the exam. Carson said other students walked out in protest when they discovered the retest was significantly harder than the original examination, but that he alone finished the test. On doing so, Carson said he was congratulated by the course instructor, who told him the retest was a hoax intended to find "the most honest student in the class". Carson said the professor awarded him $10 and that a photographer for the Yale Daily News was present to take his picture, which appeared in the student newspaper with a story about the experiment. Doubts were raised about this story in 2015 during Carson's presidential campaign. The Wall Street Journal attempted to verify Carson's account, reporting that Yale undergraduate courses were identified with only two digits in the early 1970s, that Yale had offered no course called "Perceptions 301" at the time, and that Carson's photo had never appeared in the Yale Daily News. Carson, while acknowledging the class number was not correct, said: "You know, when you write a book with a co-writer and you say that there was a class, a lot of [the] time they'll put a number or something just to give it more meat. You know, obviously, decades later, I'm not going to remember the course number."

=== Medical school ===
Carson entered the University of Michigan Medical School in 1973, and at first he struggled academically, doing so poorly on his first set of comprehensive exams that his faculty adviser recommended he drop out of medical school or take a reduced academic load and take longer to finish. He continued with a regular academic load, and his grades improved to average in his first year of medical school. By his second year of medical school, Carson began to excel academically by seldom attending lectures and instead studying textbooks and lecture notes from 6 a.m. to 11 p.m. Carson graduated from the University of Michigan Medical School with an M.D. degree in 1977, and he was elected to the Alpha Omega Alpha Honor Medical Society.

Carson was then accepted by the Johns Hopkins University School of Medicine neurosurgery program, where he served one year as a surgical intern and five years as a neurosurgery resident, completing the final year as chief resident in 1983. He then spent one year (1983–1984) as a Senior Registrar in neurosurgery at the Sir Charles Gairdner Hospital in Nedlands, a suburb of Perth, Western Australia.

== Medical career ==
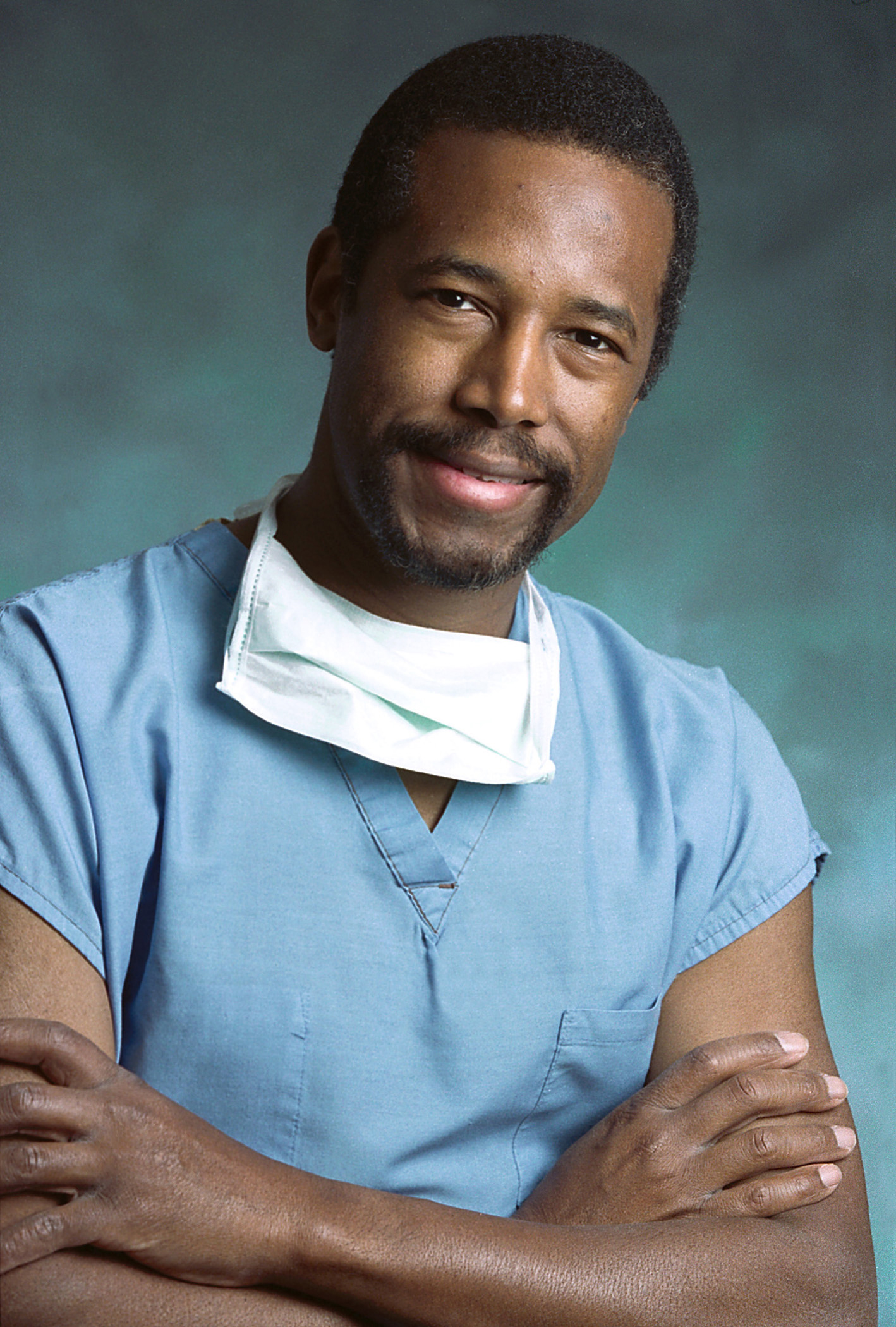
Undated portrait of Carson during his medical career

Upon returning to Johns Hopkins in 1984, Carson was appointed the university's director of pediatric neurosurgery. As a surgeon, he specialized in traumatic brain injuries, brain and spinal cord tumors, achondroplasia, neurological and congenital disorders, craniosynostosis, epilepsy, and trigeminal neuralgia. While at Johns Hopkins, Carson figured in the revival of the hemispherectomy, a drastic surgical procedure in which part or all of one hemisphere of the brain is removed to control severe pediatric epilepsy. Encouraged by John M. Freeman, he refined the procedure in the 1980s and performed it many times.

In 1987, Carson was the lead neurosurgeon of a 70-member surgical team that separated conjoined twins Patrick and Benjamin Binder, who had been joined at the back of the head (craniopagus twins). The separation surgery held promise in part because the twin boys had separate brains. The Johns Hopkins Children's Center surgical team rehearsed the surgery for weeks, practicing on two dolls secured together by Velcro. Although there were few follow-up stories after the Binder twins' return to Germany seven months after the operation, both twins were reportedly "far from normal" two years after the procedure, with one in a vegetative state. Neither twin was ever able to talk or care for himself, and both eventually became institutionalized wards of the state. Patrick Binder died sometime between the late 2000s and early 2010s, according to his uncle, who was located by The Washington Post in 2015. The Binder surgery served as a model for similar twin separations, with its procedure being refined in subsequent decades. Carson participated in four subsequent high-risk conjoined-twin separations, including a 1997 operation on craniopagus Zambian twins Joseph and Luka Banda, which resulted in a normal neurological outcome. Two sets of twins died, including Iranian twins Ladan and Laleh Bijani. Another separation resulted in the death of one twin and the survival of the other, who is legally blind and struggles to walk.

According to The Washington Post, the Binder surgery "launched the stardom" of Carson, who "walked out of the operating room that day into a spotlight that has never dimmed", beginning with a press conference that was covered worldwide and created name recognition leading to publishing deals and a motivational speaking career. On the condition the film would have its premiere in Baltimore, Carson agreed to a cameo appearance as "head surgeon" in the 2003 Farrelly brothers comedy Stuck on You, starring Matt Damon and Greg Kinnear as conjoined twins who, unhappy after their surgical separation, continue life attached to each other by Velcro.

In September 1992, Carson appeared in an advertisement opposing Maryland Question 6, a referendum on a bill to codify the Roe v. Wade decision, in which he said he opposed abortion and would refer patients seeking the procedure to other doctors. He later condemned the advertisement and asked for it to be taken down, saying that he had not known that he was making a political advertisement and did not support making abortion illegal. However, in a 2024 interview, Carson stated he 'would love to see a nationwide ban' on abortion and acknowledged a past stance against exceptions for rape and incest, though he noted that he now supports leaving the issue to the states following the overturning of Roe v. Wade.

In March 2013, Carson announced he would retire as a surgeon, saying he would "much rather quit when I'm at the top of my game". His retirement became official on July 1, 2013.

In 2021, Carson joined Galectin Therapeutics to assist with development of the company's galectin-3 inhibitor, belapectin, as a treatment for NASH cirrhosis and in combination with immunotherapy for the treatment of cancers.

== Articles, books, business relationships, media posts ==
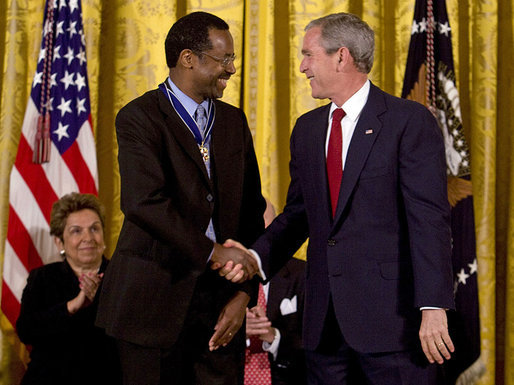
Carson and President George W. Bush in 2008

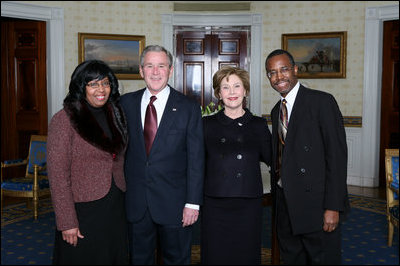
Ben and Candy Carson with George and Laura Bush in 2008

Carson has written many articles in peer-reviewed journals and six bestselling books published by Zondervan, an international Christian media and publishing company. The first book was an autobiography published in 1992. Two others are about his personal philosophies of success and what he sees as the stabilizing influence of religion.

According to CNN, Carson had an "extensive relationship" from 2004 to 2014 with Mannatech, a multi-level marketing company that produces dietary supplements made from substances such as aloe vera extract and larch-tree bark. Carson gave four paid speeches at company events. He has denied being paid by Mannatech to do anything else, saying he has been a "prolific speaker" who has addressed many groups. In a 2004 speech, he credited the company's products with the disappearance of his prostate cancer symptoms. The nature of this relationship became an issue in 2015 during Carson's presidential campaign. Carson's relationship with Mannatech continued after the company paid $7 million in 2009 to settle a deceptive-marketing lawsuit in Texas over claims that its products could cure autism and cancer. His most recent paid speech for the company was in 2013, for which he was paid $42,000. His image appeared on the corporation's website in 2014, and in the same year, he praised their "glyconutrient" supplements in a PBS special that was subsequently featured on the site.

Carson delivered the keynote address at a Mannatech distributor convention in 2011, during which he said the company had donated funds to help him obtain a coveted endowed-chair post at Johns Hopkins Medicine: "three years ago I had an endowed chair bestowed upon me and uh, it requires $2.5 million to do an endowed chair, and I'm proud to say that part of that $2.5 million came from Mannatech." In October 2015, Carson's campaign team said that "there was no contribution from Mannatech to Johns Hopkins" and that his statement had been "a legitimate mistake on his part. Confusion. He had been doing some fundraising for the hospital and some other chairs about that time, and he simply got things mixed up."

During the CNBC GOP debate on October 28, 2015, Carson was asked about his relationship with Mannatech. He replied, "That's easy to answer. I didn't have any involvement with Mannatech. Total propaganda. I did a couple speeches for them. I did speeches for other people—they were paid speeches. It is absolutely absurd to say I had any kind of relation with them. Do I take the product? Yes. I think it is a good product." PolitiFact rated Carson's denial of any involvement as "false", pointing to his paid speeches for Mannatech and his appearances in promotional videos in which he favorably reviewed its products, despite not being "an official spokesman or sales associate". When the CNBC moderator commented that Carson was on Mannatech's website, Carson replied that he had not given his permission. Earlier, he had said he was unaware of the company's legal history.

On November 3, 2015, Mannatech said on its website that for compliance with federal campaign finance regulations, the company had removed all references to Carson before he announced his bid for the presidency.

In July 2013, Carson was hired by The Washington Times as a weekly opinion columnist. In October 2013, Fox News hired Carson as a contributor to provide analysis and commentary across Fox News Channel's daytime and primetime programming, a relationship that lasted until the end of 2014.

In 2014, some House Republicans (who later formed the House Freedom Caucus) approached Carson about the possibility of his standing for Speaker of the House in the event that the incumbent Speaker, John Boehner, had to step down because of intraparty disunion. Carson declined, citing preparations for his 2016 presidential campaign. Ultimately, Boehner resigned in October 2015, and Paul Ryan was elected as the new Speaker.

In financial disclosure forms, Carson and his wife reported income of between $8.9 million and $27 million from January 2014 to May 3, 2015, when he announced his presidential campaign. Over that period, Carson received over $4 million from 141 paid speeches, between $1.1 million and $6 million in book royalties, between $200,000 and $2 million as a contributor to The Washington Times and Fox News, and between $2 million and $10 million as a member of the boards of Kellogg Co. and Costco Wholesale Corp. He resigned from Costco's board in mid-2015, after serving on it for more than 16 years. Carson was chairman of the Baltimore-based biotechnology company Vaccinogen from August 2014 until the announcement of his US presidential bid in May 2015. Carson had previously served on Vaccinogen's Medical Advisory Board. Carson serves on the board of Sinclair Broadcast Group.

== 2016 presidential campaign ==
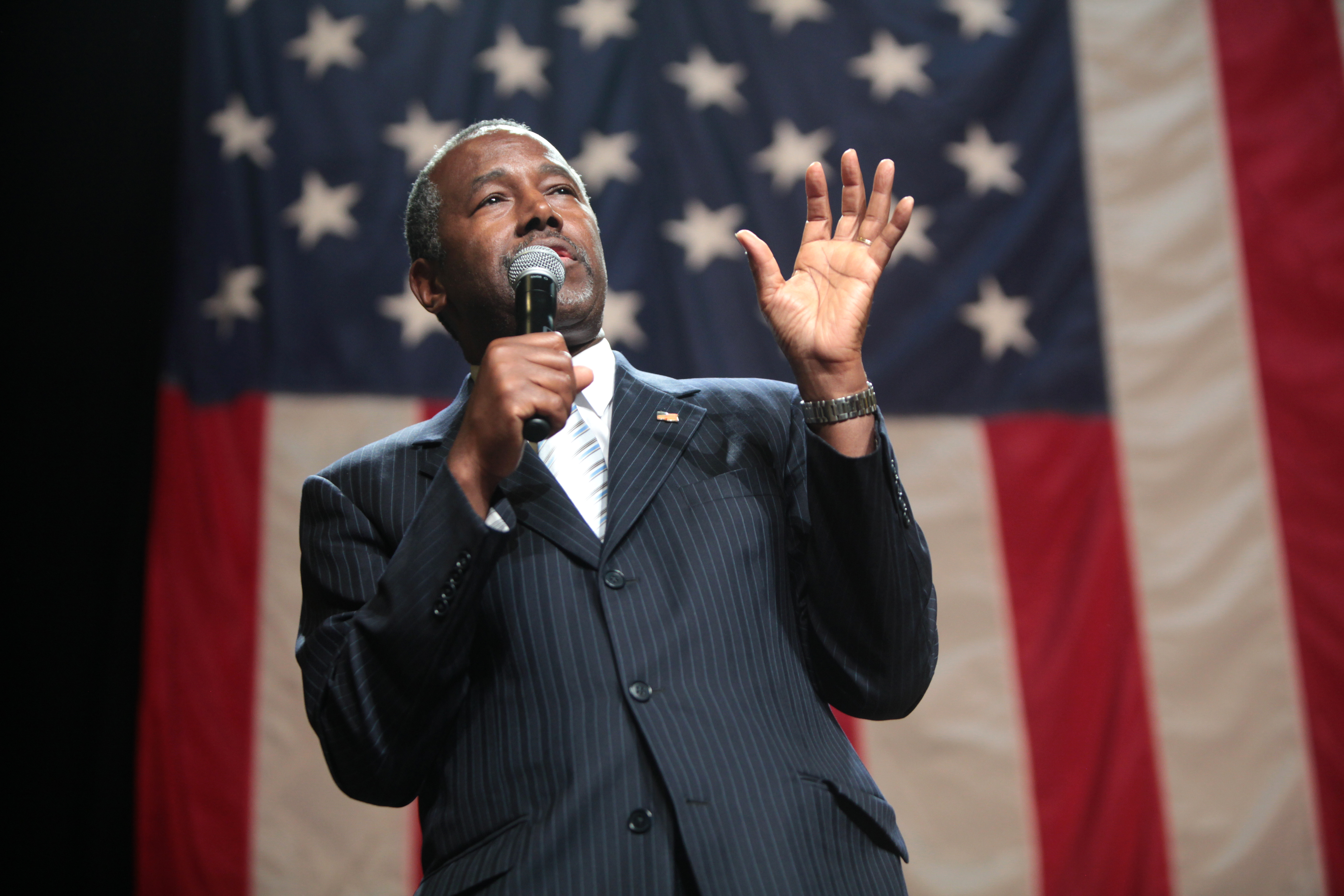
Carson speaking at a campaign event in August 2015

=== Background and increasing political visibility ===
Carson, who had been registered as a Republican, changed his registration to independent in the 1990s after watching Republicans impeach President Clinton for perjury regarding an extramarital affair with Monica Lewinsky. "I just saw so much hypocrisy in both parties", he said. In February 2013, Carson said he was not a member of any political party.

In his book America the Beautiful (2013), he wrote: "I believe it is a very good idea for physicians, scientists, engineers, and others trained to make decisions based on facts and empirical data to get involved in the political arena."

Carson was the keynote speaker at the National Prayer Breakfast on February 7, 2013. The speech garnered Carson considerable attention because the event is normally apolitical in nature, and the speech was critical of the philosophy and policies of President Barack Obama, who was sitting 10 feet away. About the speech, Carson said: "I don't think it was particularly political ... You know, I'm a physician." Regarding the policies of President Obama, he said: "There are a number of policies that I don't believe lead to the growth of our nation and don't lead to the elevation of our nation. I don't want to sit here and say all of his policies are bad. What I would like to see more often in this nation is an open and intelligent conversation."

Carson's sudden popularity among conservatives led to him being invited to the 2013 Conservative Political Action Conference (CPAC) as a speaker. He tied for seventh place in the Washington Times/CPAC 2013 straw poll with 4% of the 3,000 ballots cast. In the 2014 CPAC straw poll, he was in third place with 9% of the vote, behind senators Ted Cruz of Texas (with 11%) and Rand Paul of Kentucky (31%). In the presidential straw poll at the 2013 Values Voter Summit, he and Rick Santorum polled 13%, with winner Ted Cruz polling 42%, and in 2014 he polled 20% to Cruz's winning 25%.

On November 4, 2014, the day of the 2014 midterms, he rejoined the Republican Party, saying it was "truly a pragmatic move" because he was considering running for president in 2016.

In January 2015, The Weekly Standard reported that the Draft Carson Committee had raised $13 million by the end of 2014, shortly after Carson performed well in a CNN/ORC poll of potential candidates in December 2014, coming second in two different versions. He polled 10% to Mitt Romney's 20%, but in the same poll with Romney removed from the list, Carson polled 11% to Jeb Bush's 14%. The Wall Street Journal mentioned that the Draft Carson Committee had chairmen in all of Iowa's 99 counties, and that Carson had recently led two separate Public Policy polls for the state of Pennsylvania.

=== Announcement of campaign ===
On May 2, 2015, Carson proclaimed that in two days he was going to make a major announcement on his decision on whether to enter the presidential race. In an interview with Cincinnati station WKRC-TV on May 3, 2015, Carson accidentally confirmed his candidacy for president. The interview was also broadcast live on WPEC. The next day, May 4, 2015, at the Music Hall Center for the Performing Arts in his home town of Detroit, he officially announced his run for the Republican nomination in the 2016 United States presidential election. The announcement speech was preceded by a choir singing "Lose Yourself" with Carson sitting in the audience. After the song, Carson took the stage and announced his candidacy alongside a speech on his rags to riches life story, at one point stating: "I remember when our favorite drug dealer was killed."

=== Surge in polls ===
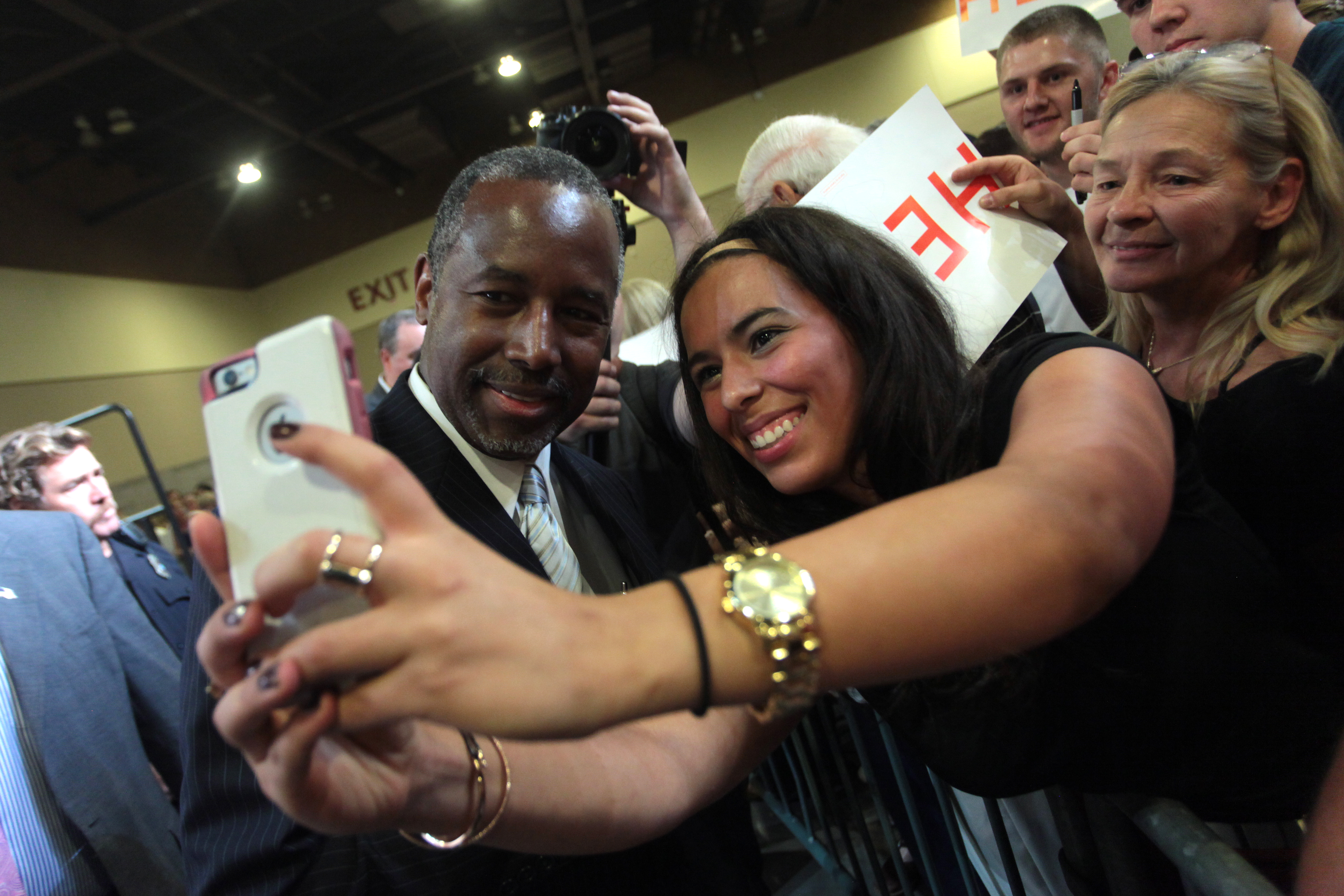
Carson at a rally in August 2015

In October 2015, the Super PAC supporting Carson, The 2016 Committee (formerly the Draft Carson Committee), announced it had received donations in mostly $100 increments from more than 200 small businesses around the country over the course of one week. Fox Business reported that "Carson's outsider status is growing his small business support base." Ben Walters, a fundraiser for The 2016 Committee, expressed optimism about Carson's small business support base: "It's unbelievable the diversity of businesses that we are bringing on. We are seeing everything from doctors' offices and folks in the healthcare profession to motorcycle repair shops and bed and breakfasts."

In October, it was noted that Carson's "improbable" political career had surged in polls and fundraising, while he continued to participate in nationally televised Republican debates.

=== Decline in polls ===
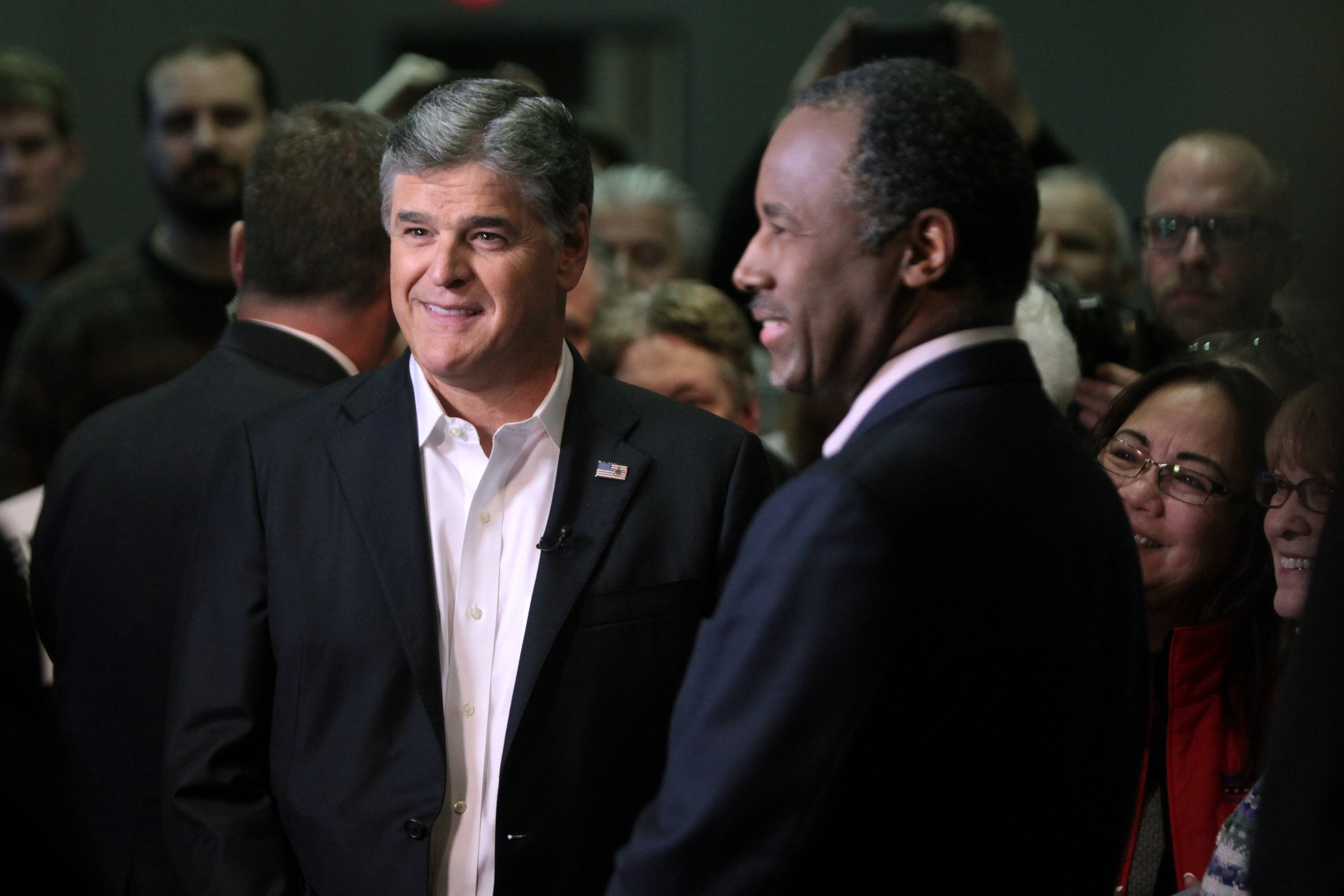
Carson and Sean Hannity in January 2016

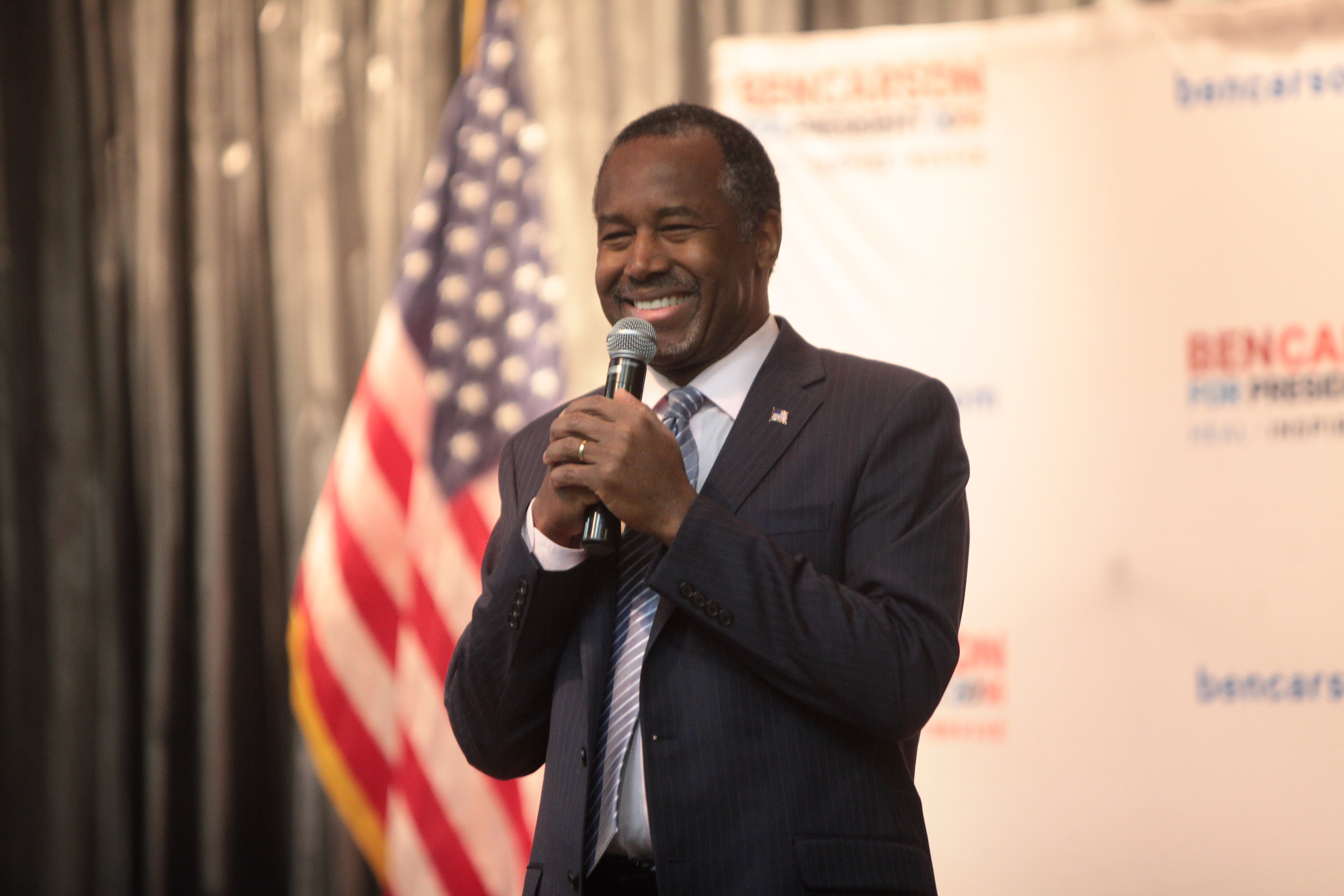
Carson speaking before the Nevada caucuses in February 2016

The campaign brought considerable attention to Carson's past. CBS News described his narrative of "overcoming impossible odds as a child growing up in an impoverished, single-parent household to reach international prominence as a pediatric neurosurgeon" as "a key part of his presidential campaign". The Wall Street Journal said his background came under "the harsh scrutiny of presidential politics, where rivals and media hunt for embellishments and omissions that can hobble a campaign". CNN characterized the core narrative as being "acts of violence as an angry young man", followed by a spiritual epiphany which transformed Carson into the "composed figure" he now portrays. Media challenges to a number of Carson's statements included allegations of discrepancies between documented facts and certain assertions in his autobiography Gifted Hands—allegations dismissed by Carson as a media "witch hunt". In November 2015, the Detroit Free Press republished an article from 1988 "to try to bring some clarity to the claims currently being brought into question".

In November 2015, Carson's campaign aired a 60-second TV advertisement in which excerpts from Carson's stump speech were intercut with a rap by an artist named Aspiring Mogul. They spent $150,000 on the ads, which were aired in Atlanta, Detroit, and Miami. Carson defended the ad, saying, "Well, there are people in the campaign who felt that was a good way to do things... I support them in doing that, but I probably would have taken a little different approach." Later, he said the advertisement was done without his knowledge, that "it was done by people who have no concept of the black community and what they were doing", and that he was "horrified" by it.

The New York Times reported in 2015, "Carson has acknowledged being something of a novice on foreign affairs." Carson said he would send arms to Ukraine to help fight pro-Russian rebels in the war in Donbas. He also believed the Baltic states, current NATO members, should "get involved in NATO".

In a November 2015 Republican debate, Carson declared his intentions to make ISIS "look like losers" as he would "destroy their caliphate". Carson also advocated capturing a "big energy field" outside of Anbar, Iraq, which he said could be accomplished "fairly easily". Regarding the Middle East, he also claimed that "the Chinese are there". Carson said he is not opposed to a Palestinian state, but he questioned why it needs "to be within the confines of Israeli territory... Is that necessary, or can you sort of slip that area down into Egypt?"

=== Withdrawal from campaign ===
On March 2, after the Super Tuesday 2016 primaries, Carson announced that he did "not see a political path forward" and would not attend the next Republican debate in Detroit. He said, "[T]his grassroots movement on behalf of 'We the People' will continue", indicating that he would give more details later in the week. He suspended his campaign on March 4 and announced he would be the new honorary national chairman of My Faith Votes, a group that encourages Christians to exercise their civic duty to vote.

In total, Ben Carson's campaign spent $58 million. However, most of the money went to political consultants and fundraising rather than advertising. Carson questioned whether his campaign was economically sabotaged from within.

=== 2016 presidential campaign after his withdrawal from the race ===
On March 11, 2016, a week after Carson ended his presidential campaign, he endorsed Donald Trump, calling him part of "the voice of the people to be heard". Carson's subsequent comments that Americans would have to sustain Trump for only four years if he was not a good president drew criticism, and he admitted that he would have preferred another candidate, though he thought Trump had the best chance of winning the general election. On the other hand, at the press conference Carson said Trump had a "cerebral" side.

On April 25, Carson expressed opposition to Harriet Tubman replacing Andrew Jackson on the $20 bill the day after dubbing the replacement "political expediency", though he indicated interest in Tubman having another tribute. In late April, Carson wrote to the Nevada Republican Party, requesting the two delegates he won in Nevada be released and free to support whoever they want.

On May 4, after Trump wrapped up the Republican nomination, he hinted that Carson would be among those who would vet his vice-presidential pick. The same day, in an interview Carson expressed interest in Ted Cruz serving as Attorney General of the United States, a position that Carson said would allow Cruz to prosecute Hillary Clinton, and then as a Supreme Court Justice nominee from the Trump administration. On May 6, Carson said in an interview that Trump would consider a Democrat as his running mate, conflicting with Trump's assertion that he would not. A Carson spokesperson later said Carson expected Trump to select a Republican. Carson was said by aide Armstrong Williams in a May 10 interview to have withdrawn from the Trump campaign's vetting team, though the campaign confirmed he was still involved. Later that month, Carson revealed a list of potential vice-presidential candidates in an interview with The Washington Post. On May 16, Carson said the media could not keep opinion out of reporting and cited Walter Cronkite as a fair journalist who was, in his words, a "left-wing radical".

During the Republican National Convention, Carson appeared with former New York City Mayor Rudy Giuliani in support of the pro-Trump Great America PAC at an event in Cleveland.

=== Results ===
In total, Carson received 857,039 votes during the Republican primaries; this total represented 2.75% of the votes cast. The only jurisdiction he carried in the primaries was in the Alaska caucuses in which he won a single state house district, but this did not result in any delegates for his campaign from Alaska since the required threshold of votes statewide was not met. He received the support of seven delegates at the Republican National Convention in Cleveland. Trump received the Republican nomination and went on to be elected president on November 8, 2016.

== Secretary of Housing and Urban Development (2017–2021) ==
=== Nomination and confirmation ===
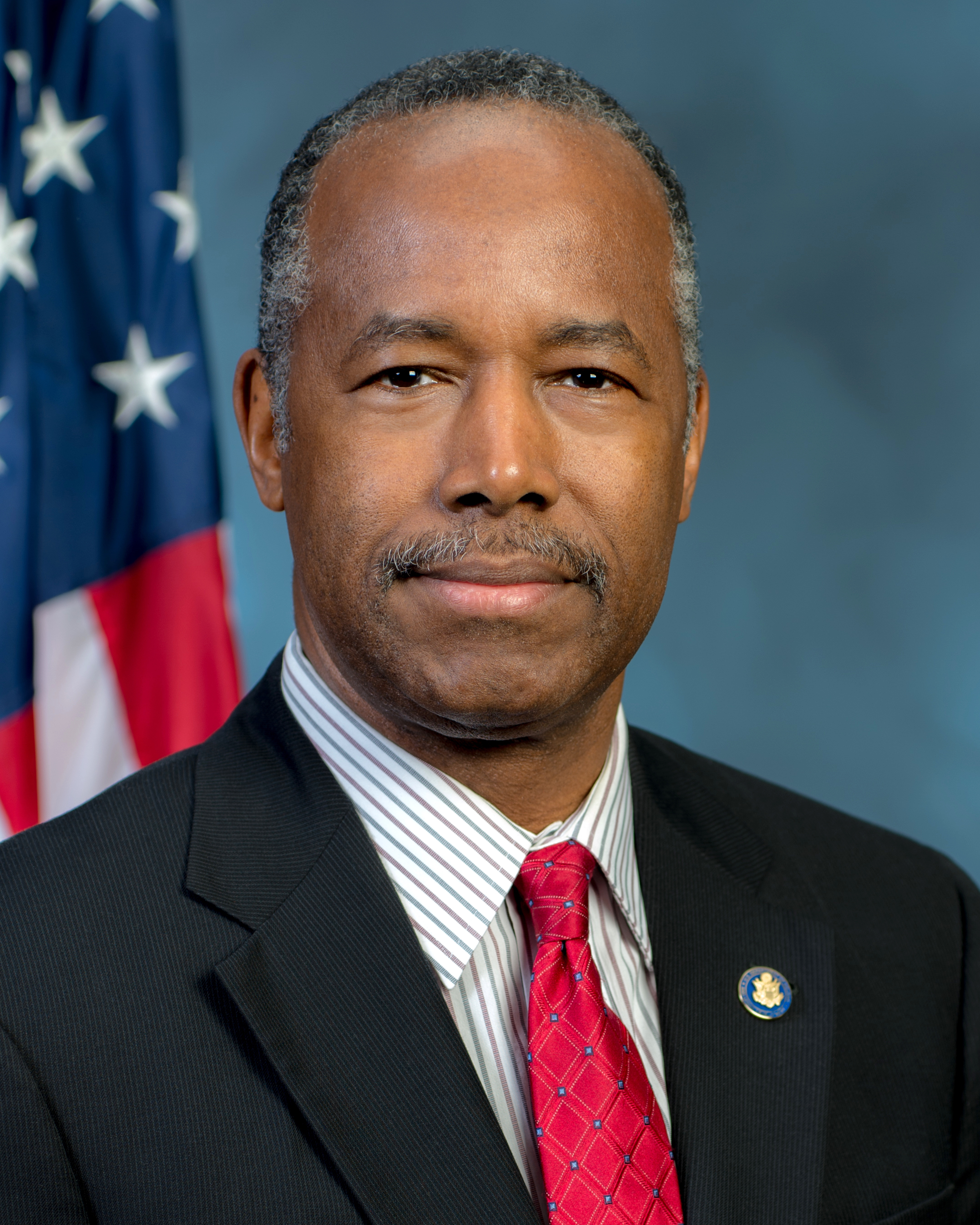
Official HUD portrait, 2017

After Donald Trump's win in the 2016 election, Carson joined Trump's transition team as vice chairman. Carson was also offered a cabinet position in the administration. He declined, in part because of his lack of experience, with an aide stating, "The last thing he would want to do was take a position that could cripple the presidency." Although it was reported that the position was for Secretary of Health and Human Services, Carson's business manager disputed this, stating, "Dr. Carson was never offered a specific position, but everything was open to him." He was eventually offered the position of Secretary of Housing and Urban Development, which he accepted.

On December 5, 2016, Trump announced that he would nominate Carson to the position of Secretary of Housing and Urban Development. During the confirmation process, Carson was scrutinized by some housing advocates for what they perceived as his lack of relevant experience.

On January 24, 2017, the Senate Committee on Banking, Housing, and Urban Affairs voted unanimously to approve the nomination. Senate Democrats attempted to defeat Carson's nomination via filibuster, but that vote failed on March 1, 2017, and he was then confirmed by the Senate by a 58–41 vote the next day.

=== Tenure ===
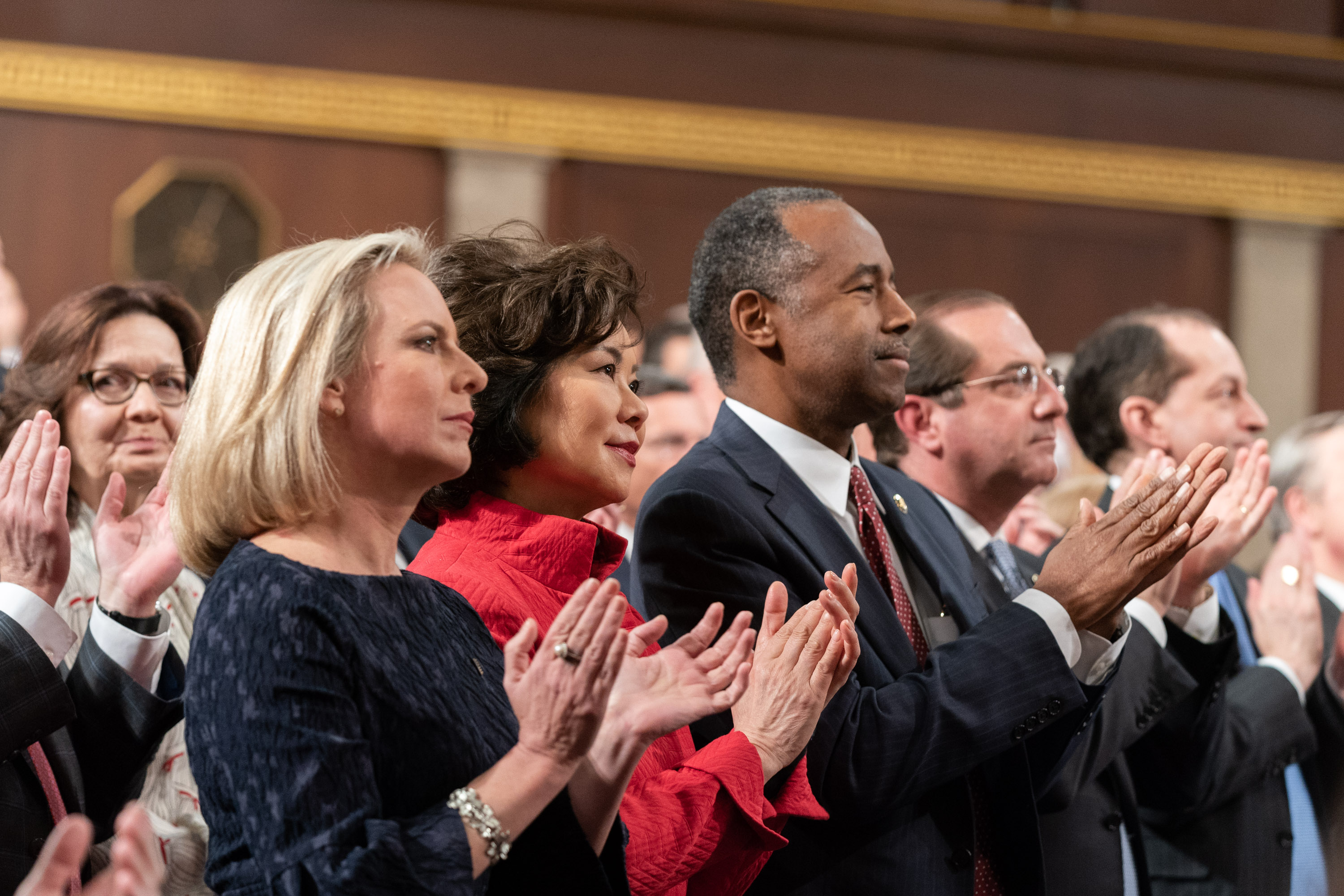
Carson at the 2019 State of the Union

In December 2017, The Economist described the Department of Housing and Urban Development (HUD), led by Ben Carson, as "directionless". Most of the top HUD positions were unfilled and Carson's leadership was "inconspicuous and inscrutable". Of the policies HUD was enacting, The Economist wrote, "it is hard not to conclude that the governing principle at HUD is to take whatever the Obama administration was doing, and do the opposite." HUD scaled back the enforcement of fair housing laws, halted several fair housing investigations started by the Obama administration and removed the words "inclusive" and "free from discrimination" from its mission statement. HUD saw an exodus of career officials during Carson's tenure.

On March 6, his first day as secretary, while addressing Housing and Urban Development (HUD) employees, Carson saluted the work ethic of immigrants, and during his comments, he likened slaves to involuntary immigrants. A HUD spokesman said that no one present thought Carson "was equating voluntary immigration with involuntary servitude". In the same speech, Carson was criticized by some for saying that the human brain "was incapable of forgetting and could be electrically stimulated into perfect recall". Under the federal budget proposed by President Trump in 2017, HUD's budget for the fiscal year 2018 would be cut by $6.2 billion (13%) and the Community Development Block Grant, a program which Carson praised in a trip to Detroit as HUD secretary, would be eliminated. Carson issued a statement supporting the proposed cuts. Carson suggested that federal funds for housing in Detroit could be part of an expected infrastructure bill.

In April 2017, while speaking in Washington at the National Low Income Housing Coalition conference, Carson said that housing funding would be included in an upcoming infrastructure bill from the Trump administration. In May 2017, Carson referred to poverty as "a state of mind." In July 2017, during his keynote address at the LeadingAge Florida annual convention, Carson stated he was concerned about "seniors who become destitute" and reported that the Department of Housing and Urban Development had increased public housing programs for the elderly by an unspecified number.

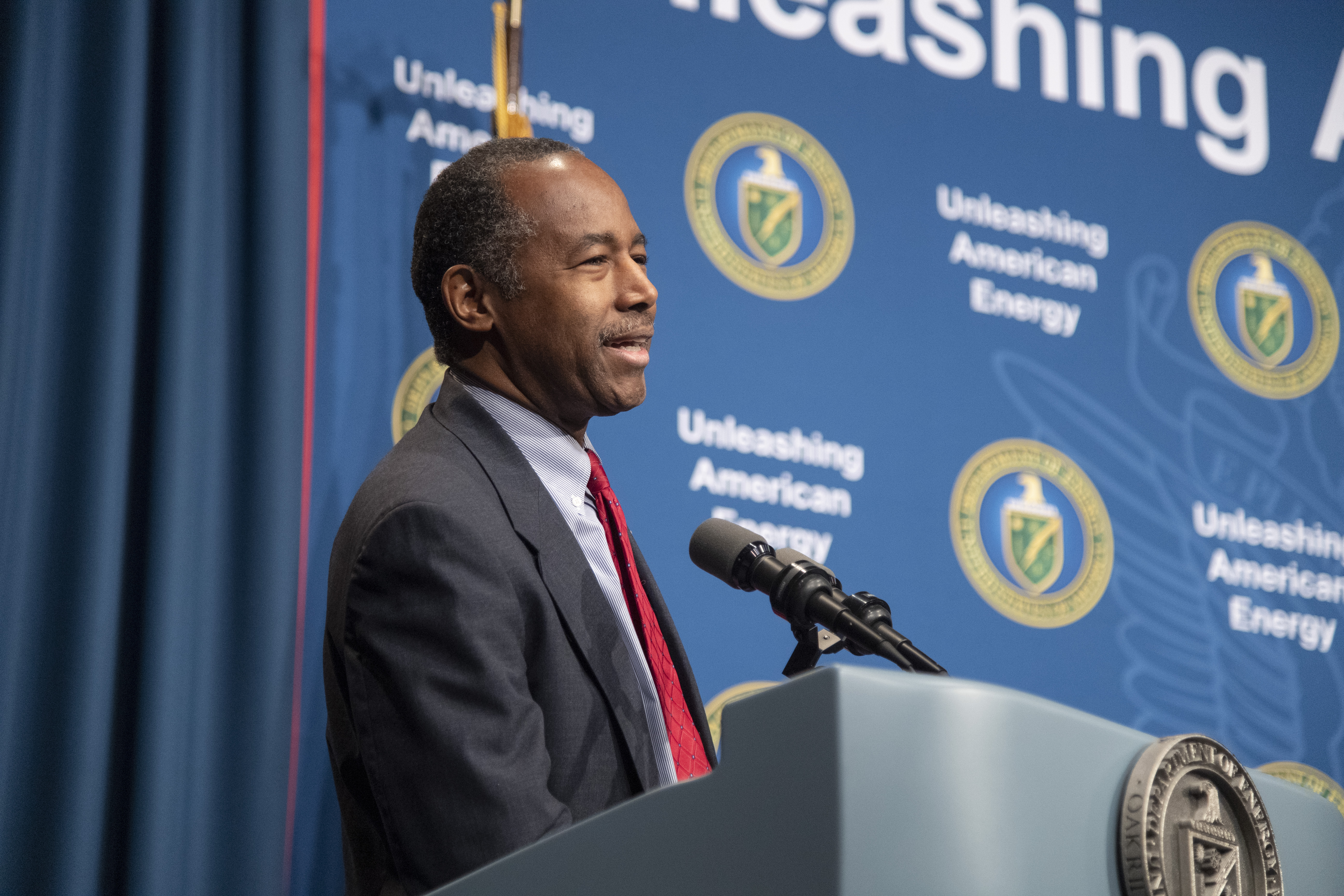
Carson speaks in 2019.

In summer 2017, Carson allowed his son, Baltimore businessman, Ben Carson Jr., to participate in organizing a HUD "listening tour" in Baltimore. Internal documents obtained by The Washington Post under the Freedom of Information Act showed that the younger Carson "put people he'd invited in touch with his father's deputies, joined agency staff on official conference calls about the listening tour and copied his wife on related email exchanges". The son's involvement prompted HUD staff to express concern; the department's deputy general counsel for operations wrote in a memorandum "that this gave the appearance that the Secretary may be using his position for his son's private gain". Carson's wife, son, and daughter-in-law also attended official meetings. In February 2018, the HUD inspector general's office confirmed that it was looking into the role Carson's family played at the department.

During congressional testimony in May 2019, while being questioned by U.S. Representative Katie Porter, Carson did not know what the term REO ("real estate owned" refers to housing owned by a bank or lending institution post-foreclosure) stood for and confused it with the cookie, Oreo. In response, Carson went on the Fox Business Network where he accused Democrats of adhering to "Saul Alinsky" tactics. On March 1, 2020, the office of Vice President Mike Pence announced Carson's addition to the White House Coronavirus Task Force.

On November 9, 2020, Carson tested positive for COVID-19 after attending Trump's Election Night party. He initially treated himself with a homeopathic oleander extract on the recommendation of Mike Lindell, the founder of My Pillow, Inc., which Carson said caused his symptoms to disappear. Oleander was previously rejected by the Food and Drug Administration as a treatment for COVID-19 and Carson received criticism for promoting an unscientific homeopathic treatment. He disclosed on November 20 that he subsequently became "extremely sick" and attributed his recovery to Regeneron's experimental antibody therapy. He said that Trump had given him access to the drug.

==== Office furnishing scandal ====
Carson received criticism for spending up to $31,000 on a dining set in his office in late 2017. This expenditure was discovered after Helen Foster, a career HUD official, filed a complaint alleging that she had been demoted from her position because she refused to spend more than the legal $5,000 limit for office redecorations. Carson and his spokesman said that he had little or no involvement in the purchase of the dining set. Later, email communications revealed that Carson and his wife selected the dining set. On March 20, 2018, Carson testified before the United States House Committee on Appropriations that he had "dismissed" himself from the decision to buy the $31,000 dining room set and "left it to my wife, you know, to choose something". On September 12, 2019, HUD's inspector general released a report clearing Carson of misconduct.

==== Remarks on transgender use of homeless shelters ====
Carson was accused by members of the Department of Housing and Urban Development of making transphobic remarks at a meeting in San Francisco in September 2019. He warned that "big, hairy men" might infiltrate homeless shelters for women, prompting one woman to walk out. Reps. Joe Kennedy III of Massachusetts and Jennifer Wexton of Virginia called for his resignation, but Carson said the accusations were a "mischaracterization".

== Carson Scholars Fund ==
In 1994, Carson and his wife started the Carson Scholars Fund which awards scholarships to students in grades 4–11 for "academic excellence and humanitarian qualities".

Recipients of the Carson Scholars Fund receive a $1,000 scholarship towards their college education. It has awarded 6,700 scholarships. In recognition for his work with the Carson Scholars Fund and other charitable giving throughout his lifetime, Carson was awarded the William E. Simon Prize for Philanthropic Leadership in 2005.

== American Cornerstone Institute ==
In 2021, Carson founded the American Cornerstone Institute, or ACI, a conservative think tank advancing policies that promote "faith, liberty, community, and life." The ACI's mission statement is "dedicated to promoting and preserving individual and religious liberty, helping our country's most vulnerable find new hope, and developing methods to decrease the federal government's role in society and to improve efficiency to best serve all our nation's citizens." The American Cornerstone Institute is a member of the advisory board of Project 2025.

== Department of Agriculture ==
On September 24, 2025, Carson was sworn in as the National Advisor for Nutrition, Health, and Housing at the U.S. Department of Agriculture.

== Personal life ==
Carson and his wife, fellow Detroit native Lacena "Candy" Rustin, met in 1971 as students at Yale and married in 1975. They moved to West Friendship, Maryland, in 1988. They have three sons and several grandchildren. Their oldest son was born in Perth, Australia, while Carson was working at the city hospital for a year.

In 2001, the couple bought a 48-acre property in Upperco, Maryland. After being diagnosed with prostate cancer, Ben underwent a two-hour operation at Johns Hopkins Hospital in Baltimore on August 7, 2002. In 2013, the couple and Carson's mother moved to West Palm Beach, Florida.

While being confirmed as Secretary of Housing and Urban Development, Carson bought a $1.22 million house in Vienna, Virginia, in February 2017 and sold his West Palm Beach home for over $900,000 in May 2017, after buying a $4.4 million house in nearby Palm Beach Gardens. He sold his Virginia home in 2020.

=== Religion ===
He was baptized at Burns Seventh-day Adventist Church in Detroit. A few years later, he told the pastor at a church he was attending in Inkster, Michigan, that he had not fully understood his first baptism and wanted to be baptized again. He has served as a local elder and Sabbath School teacher in the Seventh-day Adventist Church and is a member of Spencerville Seventh-day Adventist Church in Silver Spring, Maryland. Although he is an Adventist, the church has officially cautioned church employees to remain politically neutral.

In keeping with his Seventh-day Adventist faith, Carson announced in 2014 that he believed "that the United States will play a big role" in the coming apocalypse. He said, "I hope by that time I'm not around anymore." Carson claims that he does not believe in hell as understood by some Christians: "You know, I see God as a very loving individual. And why would he torment somebody forever who only had a life of 60 or 70 or 80 years? Even if they were evil. Even if they were only evil for 80 years?" This is in line with Adventist teaching, which promotes annihilationism, the belief that souls in hell are destroyed rather than tormented.

Carson endorsed Seventh-day Adventist theology, which includes believing in a literal reading of the first chapters of Genesis. In a 2013 interview with Adventist News Network, Carson said: "You know, I'm proud of the fact that I believe what God has said, and I've said many times that I'll defend it before anyone. If they want to criticize the fact that I believe in a literal, six-day creation, let's have at it because I will poke all kinds of holes in what they believe." Carson's Adventism was criticized by his then-primary rival Donald Trump. Some Adventists argue that Carson's political positions on gun rights and religious liberty conflict with historic Adventist teachings in favor of nonviolence, pacifism, and the separation of church and state.

In 1998, Carson gave the commencement address at Andrews University in Berrien Springs, Michigan, the flagship institution of the Seventh Day Adventist school system. During the speech, Carson voiced sympathies for a long discredited belief that the pyramids of Giza were built by the Biblical figure Joseph to store grain. (Note: The pyramids were built as tombs for Old Kingdom Egyptian kings. The story of Joseph is usually dated as set in the time of Egypt's Middle Kingdom, five centuries after the time most scholars belief the pyramids of Giza were built.) When questioned about it again in 2015, Carson stood by the assertion.

In May 2025, Trump appointed Carson to be Vice Chair of the Religious Liberty Commission. The commission was created to advise on religious liberty policies, identify threats to freedom, and recommend protections for religious expression.

=== Vegetarianism ===
Consistent with the practice of many Adventists, Carson was a part-time lacto-ovo vegetarian (he ate dishes containing milk, eggs, or cheese and occasionally poultry). He said his main reason for becoming vegetarian was health concerns, including avoiding parasites and heart disease, and he emphasizes the environmental benefits of vegetarianism. His transition was made easier because he had eaten little meat for ascetic reasons as a child, and he readily adopted his wife's vegetarianism because she does much of the cooking in their household. Speaking in 1990, he said that with the increasing availability of meat substitutes, "It might take 20 years. But eventually there will no longer be a reason for most people to eat meat. And animals will breathe a sigh of relief." To avoid causing others discomfort, he is willing to occasionally eat chicken or turkey, although he finds eating pork highly unpleasant. In August 2015, Carson said he does "occasionally enjoy a nice steak or a hamburger" and does not "have anything against meat" at a town hall meeting in Iowa.

== Awards and honors ==
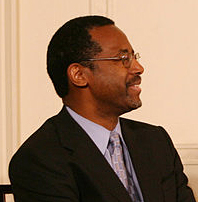
Carson at the White House in 2008 being awarded the Presidential Medal of Freedom

Carson is a member of the American Academy of Achievement, Alpha Omega Alpha Honor Medical Society, and the Horatio Alger Association of Distinguished Americans. Carson has been awarded 38 honorary doctorate degrees and dozens of national merit citations. He is an emeritus fellow of the Yale Corporation.

Detroit Public Schools opened the Dr. Benjamin Carson High School of Science and Medicine for students interested in pursuing healthcare careers. The school is partnering with Detroit Receiving Hospital and Michigan State University.

- In 2000, he received the Award for Greatest Public Service Benefiting the Disadvantaged, an award given out annually by Jefferson Awards.
- In 2001, he was elected by the Library of Congress on the occasion of its 200th anniversary to be one of the 89 who earned the designation Library of Congress Living Legend.
- In 2004, he was appointed to serve on the President's Council on Bioethics.
- In 2005, Carson was awarded the William E. Simon Prize for Philanthropic Leadership.
- In 2006, he received the Spingarn Medal from the NAACP, their highest honor for outstanding achievement.
- In 2008, the White House awarded Carson the Presidential Medal of Freedom, the nation's highest civilian honor.
- In 2008, Ford's Theatre Society awarded Carson the Ford's Theatre Lincoln Medal, for exemplifying the qualities embodied by President Abraham Lincoln—including courage, integrity, tolerance, equality, and creative expression—through superior achievements.
- In 2008, U.S. News & World Report named Carson as one of "America's Best Leaders".
- In 2010, he was elected into the National Academy of Sciences Institute of Medicine, considered one of the highest honors in the fields of health and medicine.
- In 2012, Carson was the Influential Marylander Award recipient from The Daily Record, Baltimore's legal and business newspaper.
- In 2014, a poll of Americans conducted by Gallup ranked Carson sixth on a list of the most admired persons.
- On September 14, 2025, President Donald Trump announced his plans to award Carson with the Presidential Medal of Freedom for a second time, which would make him the third man after Ellsworth Bunker and Colin Powell to be awarded the Medal twice.

== Bibliography ==
- Gifted Hands: The Ben Carson Story. Zondervan. 1992. ISBN 978-0-310-54651-1. (with Cecil Murphey)
- Think Big: Unleashing Your Potential for Excellence. Zondervan. 1996. ISBN 0-310-21459-9.
- The Big Picture: Getting Perspective on What's Really Important in Life. Zondervan. 2000. ISBN 978-0-310-22583-6. (with Gregg Lewis)
- Take the Risk: Learning to Identify, Choose, and Live with Acceptable Risk. Zondervan. 2009. ISBN 978-0-310-25973-2.
- America the Beautiful: Rediscovering What Made This Nation Great. Thomas Nelson. 2013. ISBN 978-0-310-33091-2. (with Candy Carson)
- One Nation: What We Can All Do to Save America's Future. Sentinel. 2014. ISBN 978-1-59523-112-3. (with Candy Carson), on The New York Times bestsellers list for 20 straight weeks, five of them as number one
- One Vote: Make Your Voice Heard. Tyndale House. 2014. ISBN 978-1-4964-0632-3. (with Candy Carson)
- Carson, Ben; Lewis, Gregg; Lewis, Deborah Shaw (2015). You Have a Brain: A Teen's Guide to T.H.I.N.K. B.I.G. Zondervan. ISBN 978-0-310-74599-0.
- My Life: Based on the Book Gifted Hands. Zondervan. 2015. ISBN 978-0-310-34451-3. (with Cecil Murphey)
- Carson, Ben MD; Carson, Candy (2015). A More Perfect Union: What We the People Can Do to Reclaim Our Constitutional Liberties. Penguin. ISBN 978-0-698-19500-4.
- Carson, Ben MD (2022). Created Equal: The Painful Past, Confusing Present, and Hopeful Future of Race in America. Center Street. ISBN 978-1-546-00264-2.
- Carson, Ben MD; Carson, Candy (2024). The Perilous Fight: Overcoming Our Culture's War on the American Family. Zondervan. ISBN 978-0-310-36837-3.

== See also ==
- 2016 Republican Party presidential candidates
- African-American candidates for President of the United States
- List of African-American Republicans
- List of African-American United States Cabinet members
- List of African-American United States presidential and vice presidential candidates

== Notes ==
Political offices
Preceded by Julian Castro	United States Secretary of Housing and Urban Development; 2017–2021	Succeeded by Matt Ammon; Acting
U.S. order of precedence (ceremonial)
Preceded by Wilbur Ross as Former U.S. Cabinet Member	Order of precedence of the United States as Former U.S. Cabinet Member	Succeeded by Rick Perry as Former U.S. Cabinet Member
