= Thomas Carter (director) =

American film and television director (born 1953)

- Born: Thomas Colbert Carter; July 17, 1953 (age 73); Austin, Texas, U.S.
- Education: Texas State University, BFA 1974
- Occupations: Director; producer; actor
- Years active: 1975–present

Thomas Colbert Carter (born July 17, 1953) is an American director, producer and actor, known for Swing Kids, Save the Last Dance and Coach Carter.

As an actor, Carter is best known for his work on the television series The White Shadow, playing James "Hollywood" Hayward.

== Personal life ==
Carter was born July 17, 1953, in Austin, Texas, and grew up in Smithville. After high school graduation Carter would enroll and attend Texas State University in San Marcos, Texas. He received his Bachelor of Fine Arts degree in theater in 1974. Following his educational career, in 1992 Carter was presented with the "Distinguished Alumnus Award" from Texas State University.

== Career ==
=== Television career (as actor) ===
Carter first began his film career as an actor. His first roles included working in television shows/movies such as: M*A*S*H, Lou Grant, What's Happening!!, The Secret of Isis, Whose Life Is It Anyway?, The Blue Knight, Good Times, and Hill Street Blues. He was a regular on the sitcom Szysznyk (1977). Carter is most known for his appearance on the series The White Shadow from 1978 through 1980.

On The White Shadow, which ran three seasons from 1978 to 1981, Carter played James Hayward, a troubled teenager with an extremely negative attitude who has to take care of his mom, Roberta, along with his younger brother, Jackie. Hayward has one of the highest IQs among his fellow players. After having an outstanding freshman year in basketball at Carver, Hayward had an opportunity to attend college, and later a chance for a summer job at a law firm.

=== Producing/directing career ===
Carter directed four episodes of The White Shadow, which led him to pursue directing as a career. He went on to produce and/or direct the television series pilots for St. Elsewhere (1982), Miami Vice (1984), Heart of the City (1986), and Equal Justice (1990), which he co-created and executive-produced. The series had a multi-ethnic cast; Carter later noted to Mark Gunther that, "I look in television and I don’t see myself," in reference to the lack of diverse roles for African-American actors.

Carter went on to produce the series about an American family, Under One Roof (1995), starring James Earl Jones, Joe Morton, and Vanessa Bell Calloway. The drama dealt with the real life complications, stress, and dilemmas of a multi-generational African American family residing in Seattle, Washington. As a mid-season replacement, the series did not last long – only six episodes – but Carter received a lot of attention for it. He stated, "No African American family with this kind of breadth and complexity has even been shown on a weekly drama. Never has there been one with the amount of talent and experience that has gone into this show."

In addition, Carter directed episodes of Fame, Remington Steele, The New Alfred Hitchcock Presents, and nine episodes of the police drama Hill Street Blues, among others. He also produced a number of series, including serving as executive producer for the 2002-04 crime series Hack, about a former police officer who operates a taxi.

=== Film career ===
Carter has come to be part of eleven movies, including Swing Kids, Metro, Save the Last Dance, Coach Carter, and the TV-movies Divas (1995) and Gifted Hands: The Ben Carson Story (2009).

== Awards ==
Carter has won a number of awards in the realm of television, film production, and directing. Carter has been the recipient of the DGA Award for Outstanding Directorial Achievement in Dramatic Shows for directing Hill Street Blues in 1981, winning three Emmy Awards (while being nominated six times) – two for Outstanding Directing for the series Equal Justice in 1990 and 1991, and the other was for Producing, Outstanding Made for Television Movie- Don King: Only in America in 1998. Carter would also win a Peabody Award and a Broadcast Film Critics Award for his work on Don King: Only in America.

== Filmography ==
As director

- Swing Kids (1993)
- Metro (1997)
- Save the Last Dance (2001)
- Coach Carter (2005)
- Gifted Hands: The Ben Carson Story (2009)
- When the Game Stands Tall (2014)

Television

- The White Shadow - four episodes
- M*A*S*H
- Lou Grant
- Hill Street Blues - nine episodes
- Fame - three episodes
- Remington Steele - episode #8 "Your Steele the One for Me"
- St. Elsewhere - four episodes
- Amazing Stories - episodes: #15 "One for the Road"; #18 "Dorothy and Ben"
- Miami Vice - episode #1 "Brother's Keeper"
- What's Happening!!
- The Secrets of Isis
- Hack - episodes: #1 "Pilot"; #2 "Favors"
- Roots - Part 3
- Animal Kingdom' - episode #12 "Karma"
- The Resident - episode #8 "Family Affair"
- Five Points - episode #3 "Too Soon to Tell"
- SEAL Team - episode #32 "Prisoner's Dilemma"
- Project Blue Book - episodes: #7 "The Scoutmaster"; #8 "War Games"
- New Amsterdam - episode #20 "Preventable"
- The Code - episode #7 "Above the Knee"
- The Red Line - episode #8 "This Victory Alone Is Not The Change We Seek"

Movies

- The Monkey Hu$tle (1976) - Player
- Almost Summer (1978) - Dean Hampton
- Whose Life Is It Anyway? (1981) - Orderly John
