= Patrick and Benjamin Binder =

German conjoined twins (born 1987)

- Born: 2 February 1987 (age 39) (Benjamin; Patrick is deceased); Germany
- Known for: First conjoined twins successfully separated by Ben Carson
- Parents: Theresa Binder (mother); Josef Binder (father)

Patrick and Benjamin Binder (born 2 February 1987) were conjoined twins, joined at the head, born in Germany in February 1987, and separated at Johns Hopkins Children's Center on 6 September 1987. They were the first twins to be successfully separated by Ben Carson, a neurosurgeon assisted by Donlin M. Long of Baltimore, Maryland. For this operation, the surgeons could prepare by studying a three-dimensional physical model of the twins' anatomy. Carson described this separation as the first of its kind, with 23 similar attempted separations ending in the death of one or both twins.

Although the surgeons were able to separate the boys, both were left profoundly disabled. According to a 2015 Washington Post article, Patrick remained completely mute; he "had a setback in the Baltimore hospital when he choked on a piece of food, going without oxygen for a short time" and later died "sometime in the last decade".

Benjamin recovered to a certain extent. The Washington Post reported that Peter Parlagi, the twins' uncle, said their father was emotionally unable ever to handle them or share in their care. He said the twins' father became an alcoholic, spent all the couple's funds and left their mother destitute and alone. She was forced to institutionalize them.

In a 1993 interview, their mother, Theresia Binder, described guilt for agreeing to the operation that ruined the boys' prospect of ever having any quality of life. According to The Washington Post's 2015 interview with Parlagi, Benjamin never learned to speak or feed himself, but he does enjoy visitors, and being taken for walks.
