= Johns Hopkins Children's Center =

- Johns Hopkins Medicine

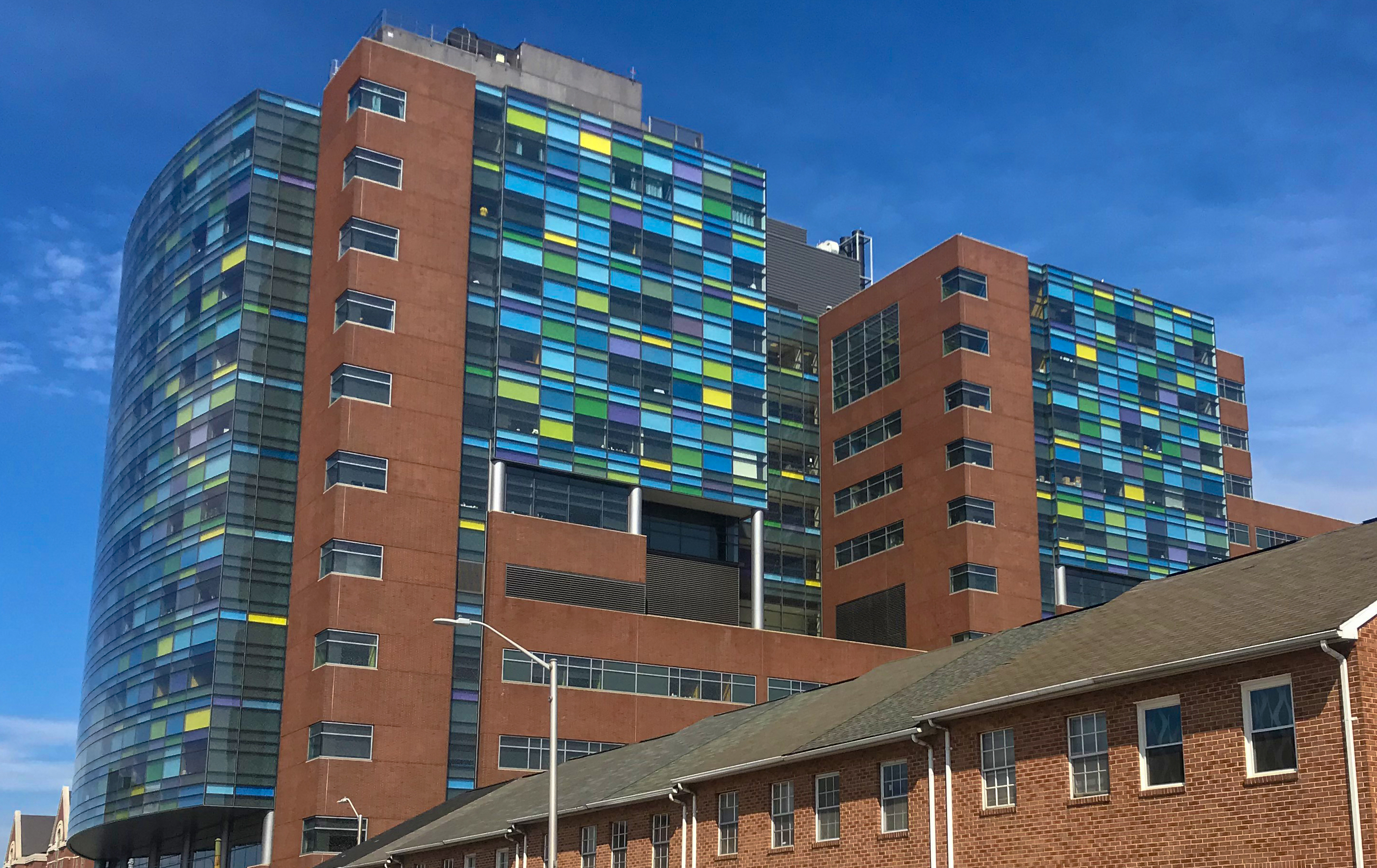
- Charlotte R. Bloomberg Children's Center of Johns Hopkins Hospital, which houses the Johns Hopkins Children's Center

Geography
- Location: 1800 Orleans St, Baltimore, Maryland, United States
- Coordinates: 39.295613°N 76.591135°W

Organization
- Type: Specialist
- Affiliated university: Johns Hopkins School of Medicine

Services
- Emergency department: Level 1 Pediatric Trauma Center
- Beds: 196
- Speciality: Children's hospital, teaching hospital

Helipads
- Helipad: FAA LID: 17MD Shared with Johns Hopkins

History
- Former name: Harriet Lane Home for Invalid Children
- Constructed: 2006
- Opened: Original: 1912; New building: 2012

Links
- Website: hopkinschildrens.org
- Lists: Hospitals in Maryland

Johns Hopkins Children's Center (JHCC) is a nationally ranked, pediatric acute care children's teaching hospital located in Baltimore, Maryland, United States, adjacent to Johns Hopkins Hospital. The hospital has 196 pediatric beds and is affiliated with the Johns Hopkins School of Medicine. The hospital is the flagship pediatric member of Johns Hopkins Medicine and is one of two children's hospitals in the network. The hospital provides comprehensive pediatric specialties and subspecialties to infants, children, teens, and young adults aged 0–21 throughout Baltimore and the wider United States. Johns Hopkins Children's Center also sometimes treats adults who require pediatric care. Johns Hopkins Children's Center also features the only ACS verified Level 1 Pediatric Trauma Center in the state. The hospital is directly attached to Johns Hopkins Hospital and is situated near the Ronald McDonald House of Maryland.

== History ==
Pediatrics at Johns Hopkins originated in 1912 when the original Harriet Lane Home for Invalid Children opened. The new hospital was set to be named after Baltimore resident Harriet Lane Johnston after she donated $400,000 in 1903 to establish the home as a memorial to her two sons who had died in childhood. After a few years of building, the building opened in October 1912. Harriet Lane Home for Invalid Children was the first children's clinic in the United States that was associated with a medical school.

At the time, most children were seen in the same facilities as adults, and pediatrics was just a subspecialty of general medicine. The new care model that Johns Hopkins pioneered became the industry standard for pediatrics in the United States. Eventually treating over 60,000 children a year, the Harriet Lane Home became a pioneer treatment, teaching, and research clinic, and the first to have subspecialties in pediatrics as created by Edwards A. Park.

From 1930 to 1963 Helen Taussig, who helped to develop the blue baby operation, headed the pediatric cardiac clinic. Child psychiatrist Leo Kanner did studies of autistic children. Lawson Wilkins established an endocrine clinic that developed procedures used universally to treat children with certain glandular disorders, including dwarfism. John E. Bordley and William G. Hardy made strides in detecting hearing impairments in very young children.

In 1964, the Children's Medical & Surgical Center (CMSC) opened on the Johns Hopkins campus to better provide patient care to their pediatric patients. The addition meant that for the first time, parents were able to sleep in the same room as their children, a rare occurrence for children's hospitals at the time. After the new Charlotte R. Bloomberg Children's Center opened in 2012, the CMSC was decommissioned and turned into a laboratory space and space to simulate a hospital environment for trainees. Plans have also been made to construct a new facade and renovate the CMSC to house more research programs.

In May 2012, the Johns Hopkins Hospital opened two new towers as part of a major campus redevelopment effort. The opening of the new $1.1 billion Charlotte R. Bloomberg Children's Center tower and the new adult Sheikh Zayed Tower marked the high point of this effort. The tower provides 560,000 square feet and many new modern amenities. The new towers featured colorful exteriors designed by artist Spencer Finch, and general design from the design firm, Perkins and Will.

Charlotte R. Bloomberg Children's Center got its name when former New York Mayor Michael Bloomberg donated $120 million to the construction of the new children's tower.

== About ==
The hospital has an American Academy of Pediatrics verified level IV neonatal intensive care unit that has a capacity of 45 bassinets. The hospital has a 40-bed pediatric intensive care unit for critical pediatric patients age 0-21. The hospital also features 10 operating rooms.

=== Awards ===
Johns Hopkins Children's Center is regularly regarded as a national leader in pediatrics.

Through their affiliation with Johns Hopkins Hospital, JHCC has been recognized by the American Nursing Association as a Magnet hospital for the years 2003, 2008, 2013, 2018.

Parents Magazine has ranked the hospital as one of the best 20 best children's hospitals in the country in their top 20 pediatric technology and innovations rankings.

As of 2021 Johns Hopkins Children's Center has placed nationally in all 10 ranked pediatric specialties on U.S. News & World Report: Best Children's Hospital rankings.

2021 U.S. News & World Report rankings for Johns Hopkins Children's Center
Specialty	Rank (in the U.S.)	Score (out of 100)
Neonatology	#16	85.7
Pediatric Cancer	#11	88.5
Pediatric Cardiology and Heart Surgery	#29	75.5
Pediatric Diabetes & Endocrinology	#12	75.8
Pediatric Gastroenterology & GI Surgery	#19	83.2
Pediatric Nephrology	#11	83.7
Pediatric Neurology and Neurosurgery	#13	85.1
Pediatric Orthopedics	#12	81.3
Pediatric Pulmonology & Lung Surgery	#20	79.1
Pediatric Urology	#26	64.8

=== Patient care units ===
The hospital offers a few different units for infants, children, teens, and young adults age 0-21 based on age or diagnosis.

- 20-bed Pediatric Medical and Surgical Oncology
- 40-bed Pediatric Intensive Care Unit
- 45-bed Level IV Neonatal Intensive Care Unit
- 35-bed Pediatric Emergency Department
- 62-bed General Pediatric Units (based on age)

=== Firsts ===
The first ever successful separation of conjoined twins occurred at the hospital on September 7, 1987. The twins, Patrick and Benjamin Binder, were the first twins to be successfully separated in the world. The separation was led by neurosurgeon Ben Carson of Baltimore, Maryland. Carson was able to prepare by studying a three-dimensional physical model of the twins' anatomy. He described this separation as the first of its kind, with 23 similar attempted separations ending in the death of one or both twins.

== Notable staff ==
- Ben Carson – former chief of pediatric neurosurgery, former Secretary of H.U.D., former presidential candidate
- Leo Kanner – founder of the specialty Child and Adolescent Psychiatry
- Catherine Neill
- Edwards A. Park
- Helen B. Taussig – pioneer of the pediatric cardiology specialty
- Vivien Thomas
- Lawson Wilkins

== See also ==
- List of children's hospitals in the United States
- Johns Hopkins School of Medicine
- Johns Hopkins Hospital
- Johns Hopkins All Children's Hospital
- Center for Talented Youth
