= Bethel University (Minnesota) =

Baptist university in Arden Hills, Minnesota, US

Coordinates: 45°3′30″N 93°9′45″W

- Former names: Baptist Union Theological Seminary (1871–1931); Bethel Junior College (1931–1947); Bethel College and Seminary (1947–2004)
- Type: Private university
- Established: 1871 in Chicago, Illinois
- Religious affiliation: Converge
- Academic affiliations: NAICU; CCCU; CCC; CIC; Space-grant
- Endowment: $39.5 million (2021)
- Budget: $145.3 million (2016)
- President: Ross Allen
- Academic staff: 544
- Students: 6,532
- Undergraduates: 2,800
- Location: Arden Hills, Minnesota, U.S.
- Campus: Suburban
- Colors: (navy blue and Vegas gold)
- Nickname: Royals
- Sporting affiliations: NCAA Division III; MIAC
- Mascot: Roy the Lion
- Website: bethel.edu
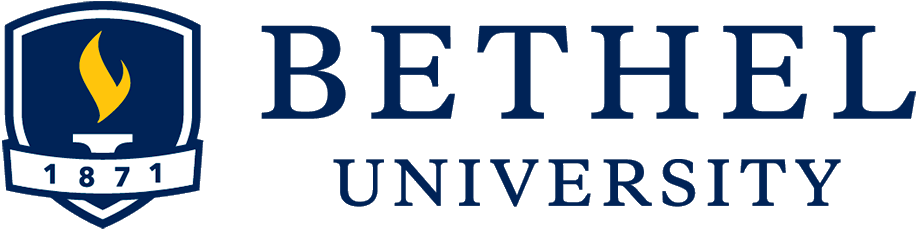

Bethel University is a private Baptist university and seminary in Arden Hills, Minnesota, United States.

It was founded in 1871 as a seminary and is affiliated with Converge. The university enrolls 5,600 students in undergraduate, graduate, and seminary programs. Its main campus is situated on about 290 acres on the east side of Lake Valentine, just south of Interstate 694.

== History ==
Bethel University has its origins in the Baptist Theological Union's Swedish Seminary ("Baptist Union Theological Seminary"), which was founded by Swedish Baptist pastor John Alexis Edgren in Chicago, Illinois, in 1871. Edgren was a former mariner and Civil War veteran originally from Östanå, Sweden, and founded the school as a place for Swedish Baptists to enter the ministry. Edgren was pastor of the First Swedish Baptist Church of Chicago and worked with the Baptist Theological Union to found the seminary. The first woman, Elizabeth Johnson, matriculated in 1879. The school moved several times, first from Morgan Park, Illinois, to Saint Paul, Minnesota, then to Stromsburg, Nebraska, and then back to Morgan Park in 1888.

In 1914, the Baptist General Conference became the school's main partner. The seminary merged with "Bethel Academy" and relocated its campus to Saint Paul. In 1931, the academy became Bethel Junior College. During World War II, Japanese Americans in concentration camps were invited to study at Bethel Junior College.

The addition of a four-year liberal arts college program created Bethel College and Seminary in 1947. The school relocated from Saint Paul to Arden Hills, Minnesota, in 1972. In 2004, the institution changed its name to Bethel University. It is affiliated with Converge.

== Academics ==
The university offers degree programs through four different schools. The College of Arts and Sciences is its traditional undergraduate program; Bethel offers bachelor's degrees in 106 majors and emphases of study, 43 minors, and 11 pre-professional programs. The College of Adults & Professional Studies offers associate degrees, bachelor's degrees, and a number of certificate programs. Through its graduate school, Bethel offers ten master's degrees, including a physician assistant program, as well as a doctorate in educational leadership. Bethel also offers a number of graduate certificate programs and licenses.

=== Seminary ===
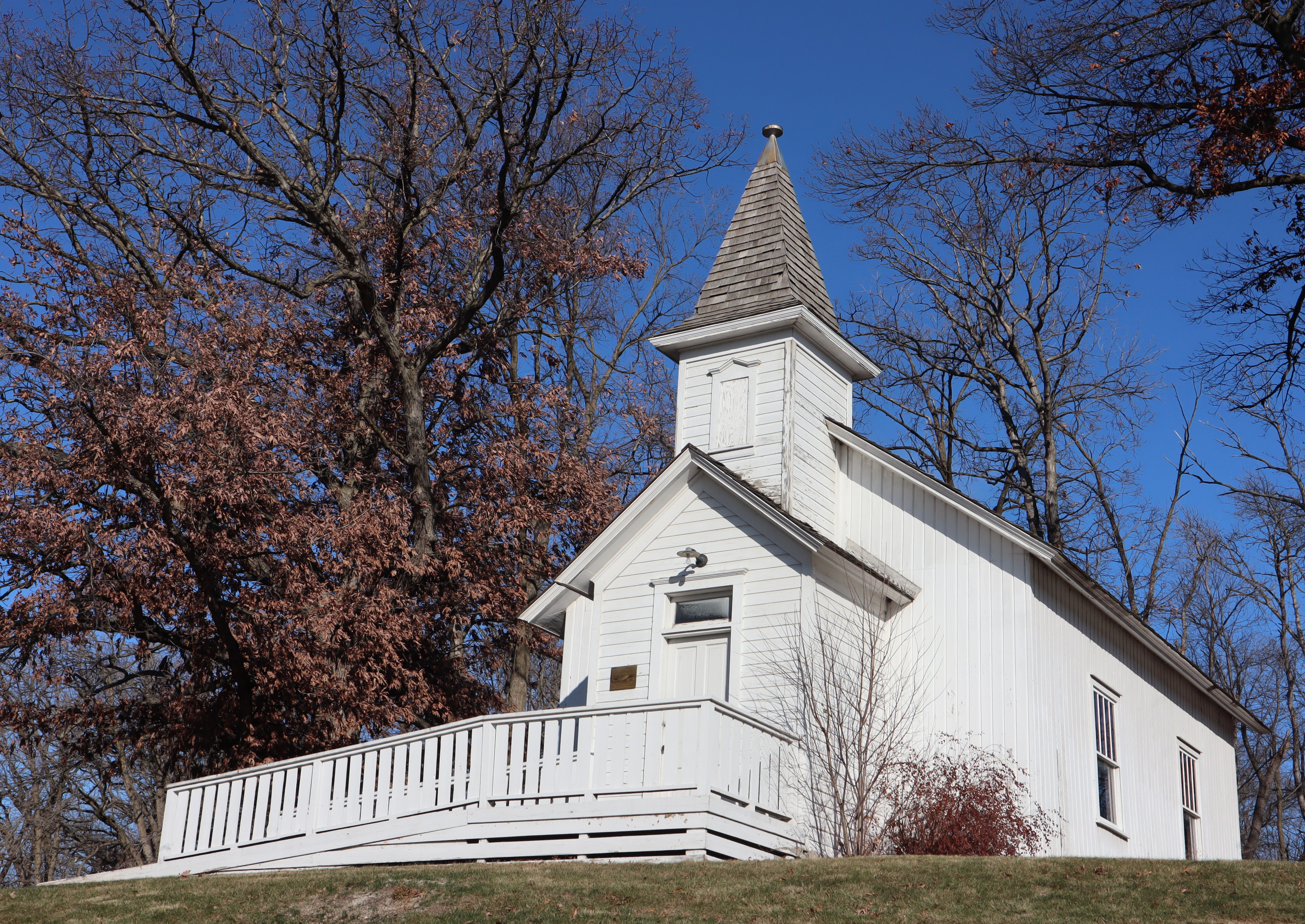
Historic Scandia Baptist Church at Bethel Seminary

The school's seminary, called "Bethel Theological Seminary", is located primarily on the Arden Hills campus. It also has a location in San Diego and offers a number of fully online programs. It offers Master of Divinity (M.Div.) and Doctor of Ministry (D.Min.) degrees, along with several Master of Arts (MA) and certificate programs.

=== Accreditations ===
Bethel has been accredited by the Higher Learning Commission since 1959. Its nursing program is approved by the Minnesota Board of Nursing. Bethel's business program is accredited by the Accreditation Council for Business Schools and Programs.

== Arden Hills campus ==
=== Academic buildings ===
There are six main academic buildings located at the center of Bethel University's main campus in Arden Hills, Minnesota. They run from southwest to northeast and are connected on the first three floors by weather-protected skyways and tunnels.

Starting from the Southwest and running to the Northeast, the buildings are as follows (with abbreviations in parentheses): Benson Great Hall and Lundquist Community Life Center (CLC), Barnes Academic Center (BAC), Brushaber Commons (BC), Clauson Fine Arts Center (CC), Hagstrom Student Services Center (HC), and Robertson Physical Education Center (RC).

=== On-campus housing ===
==== Freshman residences ====
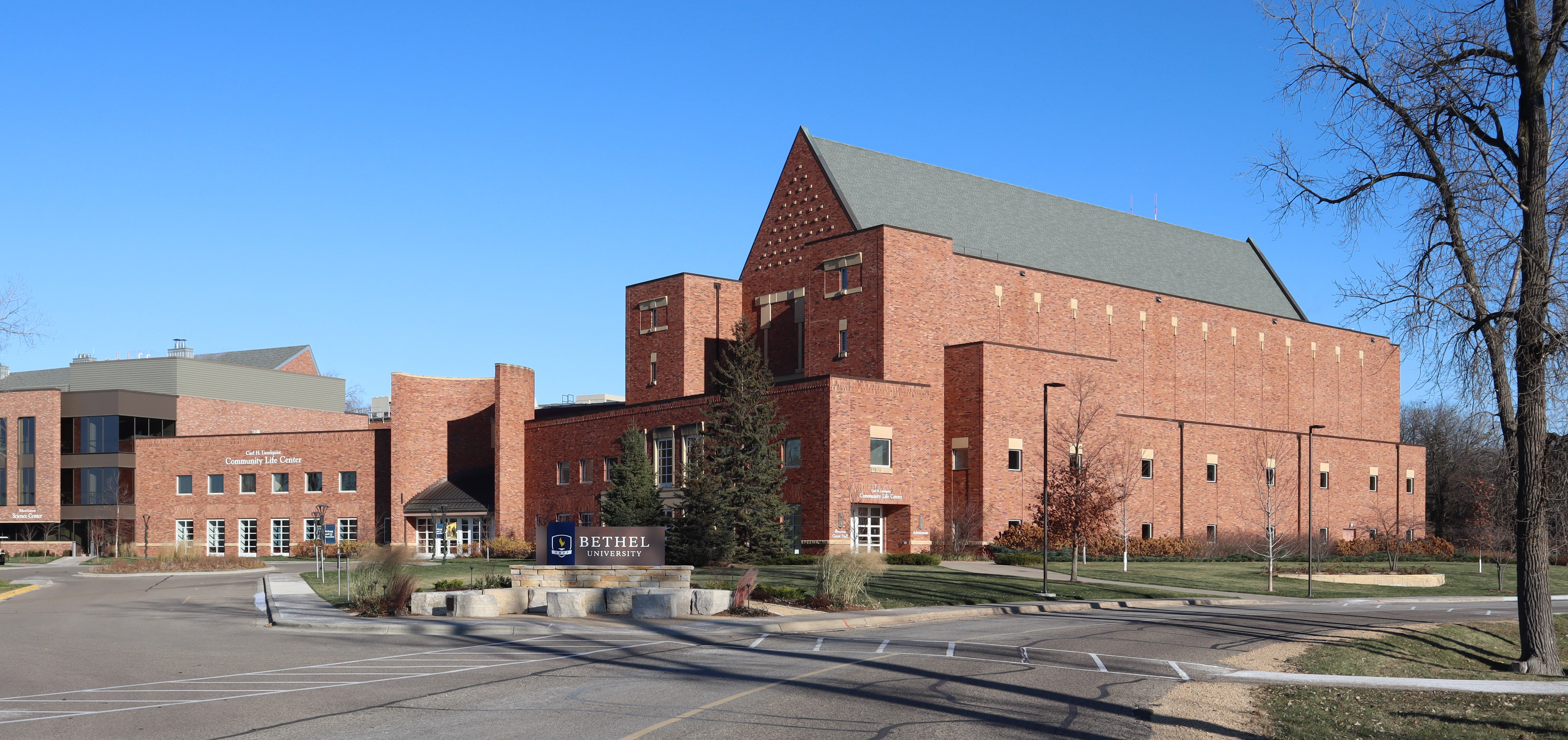
Bethel University from the main entrance, off Old Snelling Avenue in Arden Hills, Minnesota

There are four freshman residence halls on campus. Three—Bodien Hall, Getsch Hall, and Edgren Hall—encircle a cul-de-sac just south of the academic buildings, informally known as Freshman Hill. The fourth, Nelson Hall, is the largest of the freshman residences, and located nearby on the north side of the academic buildings. It is the oldest building on Bethel University's current campus in Arden Hills.

==== Residences for returning students ====
Two residence halls, Arden Village and Lissner Hall, mostly house returning students. North Village, a collection of six buildings formerly used as housing for seminary students, houses returning students and offers a full kitchen in every suite. It is located at the far north end of the campus. Heritage Hall, opened in 1999, is a suite-style residence hall, housing juniors and seniors. Students enrolling after Fall 2019 must be 21 years of age prior to September 1 to live off-campus with the exception of those who commute from their parents' home.

=== Brushaber Commons ===
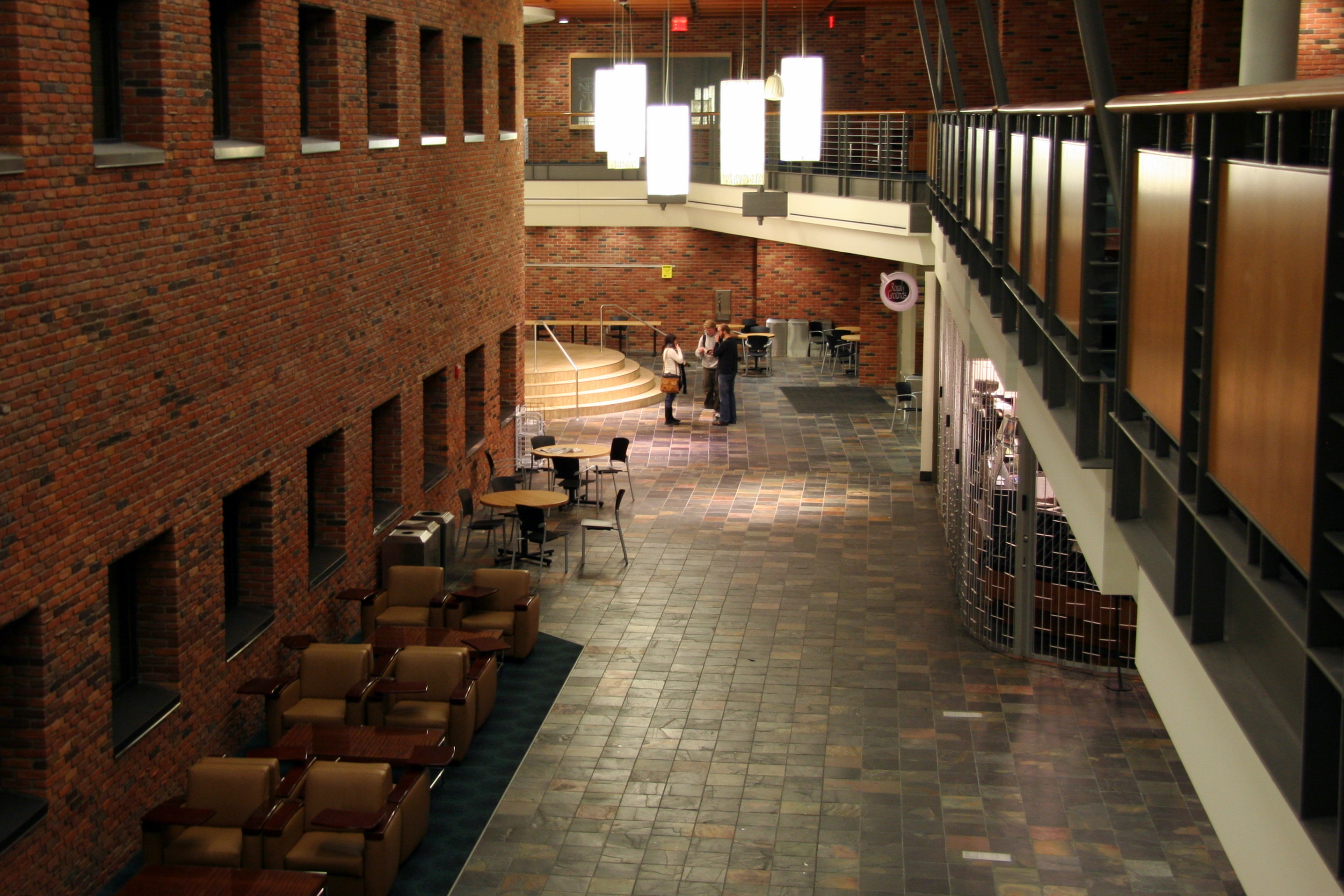
Commons Building in 2010

The Brushaber Commons, a $30 million, 106,000-square foot student commons area, opened in 2009. The Brushaber Commons is named after retired Bethel President George K. Brushaber. In addition to serving as a gathering point for students, the commons includes a dining center, coffee shop, restaurant, campus store, office space, public meeting areas, and an admissions center.

=== Benson Great Hall ===
Benson Great Hall, Bethel's performing arts center, is a 1,700-seat concert hall with a 4,000-pipe Blackinton organ located in the center of the Lundquist Community Life Center. This hall houses worship services, theatre productions, and can be rented by outside performers. Benson Hall has hosted a variety of events in the past, providing a venue for Saint Paul Chamber Orchestra, a location for high school graduations, and the 2018 Super Bowl Gospel Celebration. Benson Great Hall offers a green room, backstage dressing rooms and bathrooms, custom sound dampening, lighting, and set design for special events.

== Student life ==
The university hymn is O God of Bethel, by Whose Hand by Philip Doddridge. A morning prayer chapel service is offered each class day, as well as vespers on Sunday evenings, but attendance is no longer mandatory.

=== Covenant for Life Together ===
All full-time students in the College of Arts and Sciences are expected to abide by the Covenant for Life Together. The Covenant is a lifestyle agreement that focuses on living a life of faith and personal morality. The Covenant emphasizes a respect for all persons and ethnic traditions and requires students to refrain from any sort of extramarital sex, homosexuality, pornography, gambling, illegal drugs, and tobacco in any form.

Under the Covenant for Life Together, students in the College of Arts and Sciences were initially prohibited from dancing or consuming alcohol year-round, but the rules were eventually relaxed to allow alcohol consumption when classes are not in session. Alcohol consumption by full-time students in the College of Arts and Sciences is still prohibited during the academic year.

=== Publications ===
Bethel University has a student news publication, The Clarion, which is printed during the school year and distributed on campus as well as online.

== Athletics ==
Bethel athletics logo

The Bethel University athletic teams are known as the Royals. The university competes at the NCAA Division III level in 18 intercollegiate sports and is a member of the Minnesota Intercollegiate Athletic Conference (MIAC).

=== Sports sponsored ===
Men's sports	Women's sports
Baseball	Basketball
Basketball	Cross country
Cross country	Golf
Football	Ice hockey
Golf	Soccer
Ice hockey	Softball
Soccer	Tennis
Tennis	Track and field
Track and field	Volleyball

=== Facilities ===
- Bethel University Arena is located at the National Sports Center in Blaine, Minnesota, and has been the home of men's and women's hockey teams since 2007.
- Hargis Park, the home field of the Bethel University baseball team, opened in the spring of 2000. It features an entirely turf field, an outdoor turf batting cage, two clay bullpen mounds, major league length dugouts, press box, and inning-by-inning scoreboard in left field and capacity for over 500 spectators.
- Ona Orth Athletic Complex opened for play in the fall of 2003 and is home to Bethel's tennis, softball, and soccer teams. The facility includes a fast-pitch softball park, six tennis courts, and a soccer practice/game field with branded team building.
- Robertson Center Gymnasium has been the home of Bethel basketball and volleyball since 1972.
- Royal Stadium, the home of Bethel's football team, was built in 1995 and renovated in 2001.

== Notable alumni ==
=== Undergraduate ===
- Chad Anderson, Republican former member of the Minnesota House of Representatives
- Bjorn Olson, Republican member of the Minnesota House of Representatives (since 2021)
- Leigh Finke, Minnesota Democratic–Farmer–Labor member of the Minnesota House of Representatives, and first transgender member of the Minnesota Legislature
- Robert Eric Frykenberg, emeritus professor at the University of Wisconsin–Madison
- Jeff Hayden, Minnesota Democratic–Farmer–Labor member of the Minnesota Senate; former member of the Minnesota House of Representatives
- Abigail and Brittany Hensel, dicephalic parapagus twins, stars of TLC's 2012 reality-television series Abby & Brittany
- Joel Hodgson, creator of (and main character in) Mystery Science Theater 3000
- Randy Hultgren, Republican former member of the U.S. Congress from Illinois
- Dennis Hutter, basketball coach
- Rico Gatson (born 1966; class of 1989), multidisciplinary artist
- Steven R. Jensen (1985), chief justice of the South Dakota Supreme Court
- Randy Jessup, Republican member of the Minnesota House of Representatives
- Mark Johnson, Republican member of the Minnesota Senate
- Sheldon Johnson, Minnesota Democratic–Farmer–Labor member of the Minnesota House of Representatives
- Steve Johnson, college football coach
- Peter Ludlow, professor of philosophy
- Dawson McAllister, talk-radio host
- Chris Meidt, Washington Redskins staff, 2007–2009
- Bob Merritt, Eagle Brook Church pastor and writer
- Bill Mounce, scholar of New Testament Greek
- Jeff Nelson, professional baseball official
- Doug Ohlson, abstract artist
- Doug Pagitt, influential figure in the emergent discussion
- Sophy Parfin, entomologist
- Mary Pawlenty, former district court judge and wife of former Minnesota governor and presidential candidate Tim Pawlenty
- Linda Runbeck, Republican member of the Minnesota House of Representatives; former member of the Minnesota Senate
- Kirk Stensrud, Republican former member of the Minnesota House of Representatives
- Ron Tschetter, former director of the Peace Corps
- Pam Wolf, Republican former member of the Minnesota Senate
- Harvey L. Wollman, Democratic former Governor of South Dakota

=== Seminary alumni ===
- Joshua Becker, minimalist writer
- Gary Smalley, writer, family counselor, and motivational speaker
- Gunnar Vingren, Swedish Pentecostal missionary and co-founder of the Assemblies of God in Brazil

== Notable current and former faculty ==
- Leith Anderson, president of the National Association of Evangelicals
- Greg Boyd, theologian and pastor
- E. Earle Ellis, professor of theology
- Michael W. Holmes, professor of the New Testament
- Steven Keillor, adjunct professor of history
- Alvera Mickelsen, former professor of journalism
- Roger E. Olson, former professor of theology
- Wayne Grudem, theologian and scholar of the New Testament
- John Piper, theologian and pastor
- Thomas R. Schreiner, scholar of the New Testament
- Andrew Rock, varsity track and field coach

== See also ==
- List of colleges and universities in Minnesota
- Higher education in Minnesota
