= Sophy Parfin =

American entomologist

- Sophy Parfin, from a 1937 yearbook
- Born: Sophie Ivanovna Parfinowich; April 22, 1918; New Haven, Connecticut
- Died: October 28, 1966 (age 48); New Britain, Connecticut
- Occupation: Entomologist

Sophy I. Parfin (April 22, 1918 – October 28, 1966) was an American entomologist associated with the National Museum of Natural History.

== Early life and education ==
Sophie Ivanovna Parfinowich was born in New Haven, Connecticut, the daughter of Russian immigrants John Parfinowich and Anastasia Hamego Parfinowich. She had an older sister, Olga; their mother died in 1919. Her father worked at a General Motors plant.

She graduated from Meriden High School in 1935, attended Bethel Junior College and earned a bachelor's degree in zoology and a teaching certificate from Wheaton College in 1939. She earned a master's degree at the University of Minnesota. Her master's thesis was titled "The Megaloptera and Neuroptera of Minnesota" (1949).

Parfin continued her education through her adulthood, taking courses in English, Russian, botany and medical entomology at the Newark College of Engineering, the U.S. Department of Agriculture, George Washington University, and the University of Maryland.

== Career ==
Parfin taught school as a young woman, in Connecticut and Maine. She worked as a mechanical engineer during World War II, in Kearny, New Jersey. From 1944 until her retirement in 1960, Parfin was an assistant curator and preparator at the National Museum of Natural History. She studied aquatic Neuroptera (fish flies), and the "bionomics of ant-lions". She was secretary of the Washington chapter of Sigma Delta Epsilon, and a member of the American Association of University Women and the Entomological Society of Washington.

== Personal life ==
Parfin retired from the Smithsonian at age 42, with worsening arthritis that affected her ability to work in a museum or laboratory. She died in 1966, in New Britain, Connecticut, at the age of 48. There is a collection of her papers in the library of the University of Minnesota.

== Publications ==
- "The Megaloptera and Neuroptera of Minnesota" (1952)
- "Additional records for Brachypanorpa carolinensis (Banks) (Mecoptera: Parnopidae)" (1955)
- "The spongilla-flies, with special reference to those of the Western Hemisphere (Sisyridae, Neuroptera)" (1956, with Ashley B. Gurney)
- "Taxonomic notes on Kimminsia (Neuroptera; Hemerobiidae)" (1956)
- "Notes on the bionomics of the Mantispidae (Neuroptera: Planipennia)" (1958)
