= Brachypanorpa oregonensis =

Scientific classification
- Domain: Eukaryota
- Kingdom: Animalia
- Phylum: Arthropoda
- Class: Insecta
- Order: Mecoptera
- Family: Panorpodidae
- Genus: Brachypanorpa
- Species: B. oregonensis

Binomial name
- Brachypanorpa oregonensis (MacLachlan, 1881)

Species of insect

Brachypanorpa oregonensis is a species of scorpionfly in the family Panorpodidae. It is found in western North America.
