= South Central College =

Public community college in Minnesota

Coordinates: 44°10′27″N 94°02′48″W

- Type: Public community and technical college
- Parent institution: Minnesota State Colleges and Universities system
- Students: 4,449 (FY 2024, unduplicated headcount)
- Location: North Mankato and Faribault, Minnesota, United States
- Website: southcentral.edu
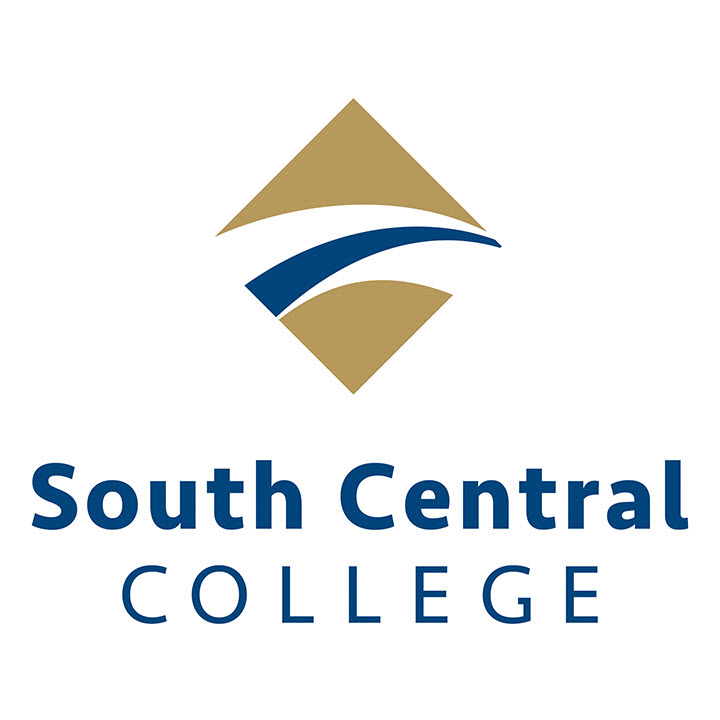

South Central College (SCC) is a public community and technical college with campuses in North Mankato and Faribault, Minnesota. It is part of the Minnesota State Colleges and Universities system, the statewide network of public higher education institutions. Founded in 1946 and re-chartered in 2005, SCC serves a 12-county region in southern Minnesota and offers academic transfer pathways, technical programs, workforce training, and farm business management outreach.

== History ==
SCC’s North Mankato campus began in 1946 as Mankato Vocational School, regarded as Minnesota’s first public post-secondary vocational institution. Faribault’s programs developed in the same era with practical nursing aligned to a local hospital. In 1995, after statewide consolidation under a single governing board, the two campuses were merged as South Central Technical College. In 2005, the institution expanded its mission and adopted the name South Central College, adding the Associate of Arts degree alongside applied programs.

== Academics ==
SCC awards certificates, diplomas, and associate degrees (AA, AS, AAS) in areas including agriculture, arts and information technology, building and design, business, health sciences, human services and education, manufacturing, and transportation. The AA provides a transfer pathway to four-year institutions, while applied programs prepare graduates for regional employment. Program offerings are available on campus and online in both traditional and hybrid formats.

== Students and outcomes ==
In Fiscal Year 2024, SCC reported an unduplicated headcount of 4,449 (Note: The FY 2024 Fact Book "Quick Facts" summary lists 4,449, while a detailed enrollment table later in the same report shows 4,499. The college generally cites the 4,449 figure in official summaries.) and a Full-Year Equivalent (FYE) of 1,860; the average student age was 23.4, and the student body was roughly evenly split by gender. For the fall 2022 full-time entering cohort, 66% had graduated, transferred, or were retained to the second fall; for the fall 2021 cohort, 53% had completed or transferred by the third spring.

Under federal Student Right-to-Know reporting, as of June 2025 SCC's graduation rate was 39% and transfer-out rate 14%, a combined 53%. Community college enrollment in Minnesota has been rising in recent years. A 2025 Federal Reserve Bank of Minneapolis report found that Minnesota's two-year public colleges saw an 11.5% increase in enrollment from fall 2023 to fall 2024, a trend reflected at South Central College.

== Accreditation ==
South Central College is accredited by the Higher Learning Commission. Selected programs hold specialized accreditations or industry certifications, such as the Commission on Dental Accreditation for Dental Assisting; the Accreditation Commission for Education in Nursing and Minnesota Board of Nursing for Nursing; the National Accrediting Agency for Clinical Laboratory Sciences for Medical Laboratory Technician; ASE and I-CAR in automotive fields; and the American Welding Society in welding.

== Service area and community ==
SCC serves a 12-county area of southern Minnesota and operates Farm Business Management offices in multiple regional cities; customized workforce education aligns training with employer needs. Eligible Minnesota residents may receive last-dollar tuition support through the statewide North Star Promise scholarship program.
