= Free Grace United =

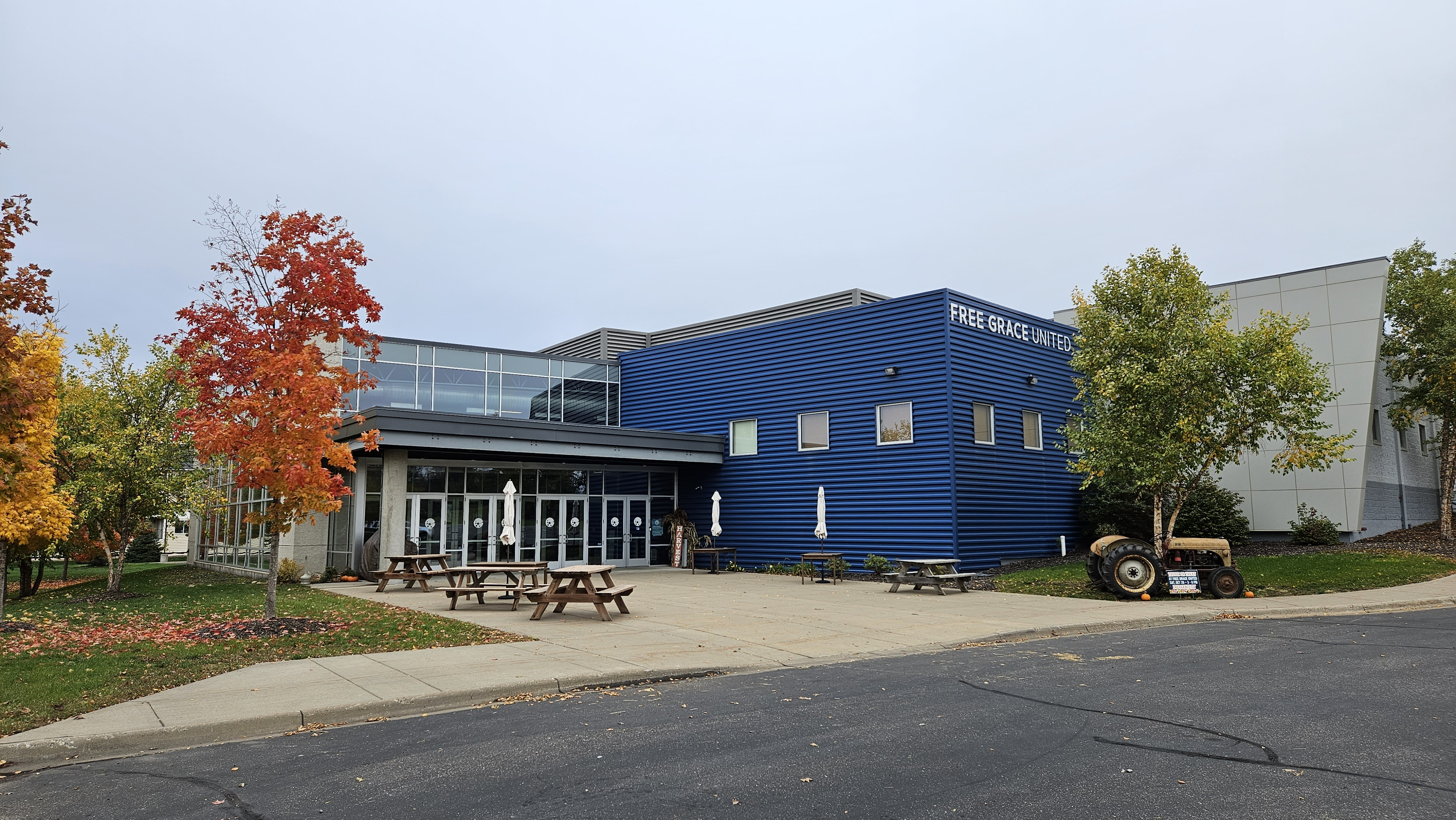
- FGU Elk River
- Location: Headquarters in Elk River, Minnesota
- Country: United States
- Denomination: Baptist
- Website: freegrace.tv

History
- Former name(s): The Crossing at Woodland Fellowship, The Crossing Church
- Founded: October 2004
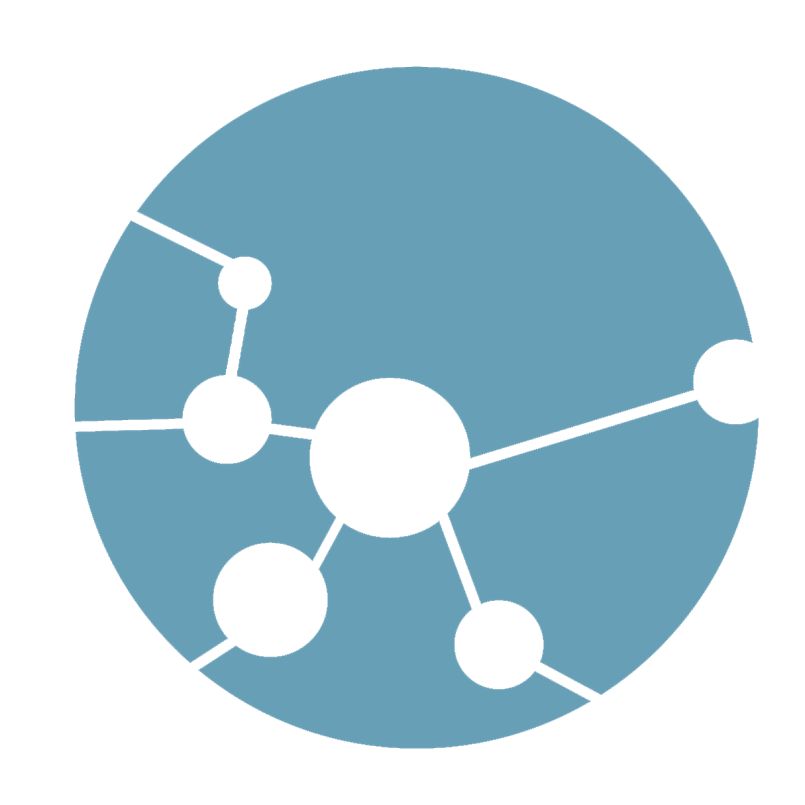

Free Grace United is an evangelical Baptist church network based in Elk River, Minnesota. Originally founded in October 2004 as The Crossing Church, it rebranded in 2019 and operates as a multisite congregation affiliated with Converge (formerly the Baptist General Conference).

Free Grace United is a family of grace-based interdependent local churches throughout Minnesota, Iowa, Wisconsin, Bangladesh, India, Liberia, Kenya, and Pakistan with a vision to launch 100 churches by 2040. Each church operates under the same name, mission, values, and statement of faith, but meet in different cities with different local pastors. Each FGU church features live preaching.

Under the leadership of Founding Pastors Eric and Kelly Dykstra, who have served since the church's inception, Free Grace United has grown into a multicongregational model. Originally launched through the support of Converge North Central, the organization provides grace-centered Bible teaching, family-oriented worship services, children's ministries, and opportunities for personal ministry involvement.

The organization centers around four "pillars": Church Planting, Free Grace Global, Free Grace Bible College, and Pine Lake Camps. These pillars serve as focal points for a broader mission to "help as many people as we can cross the line of faith and follow Jesus." The flagship Elk River campus serves as the headquarters for the entire organization and its primary broadcast location.

== Locations ==
=== United States ===
Map

The United States locations include congregations and ministry locations in Minnesota, Iowa, and Wisconsin. Free Grace United's official location directory organizes its U.S. locations by state. Free Grace United locations

==== Minnesota ====
- Free Grace United — Elk River
- Free Grace United — Becker
- Free Grace United — North Minneapolis
- Free Grace United — Minneapolis
- Free Grace United — Saint Paul
- Free Grace United — Saint Cloud
- Free Grace United — Zimmerman
- Free Grace United — Princeton
- Free Grace United — Milaca
- Free Grace United — Foley
- Free Grace United — Albertville
- Free Grace United — Mille Lacs County Jail

==== Iowa ====
- Free Grace United — Chariton
- Free Grace United — Eldora
- Free Grace United — What Cheer
- Free Grace United — Keokuk County Jail

==== Wisconsin ====
- Free Grace United — Deer Park

=== Free Grace Global ===
Map

Free Grace Global currently partners with local leaders in Liberia, Kenya, Pakistan, India, and Bangladesh. Its main Global page states that the Free Grace Global family includes 44 churches across these five countries, although specific locations of these churches are not disclosed for their safety. Free Grace Global

== Beliefs ==
Free Grace United and its ministries adhere to a Baptist confession of faith and is a member of Converge.

Its theology is centered on the authority of the Bible and salvation by grace through faith in Jesus Christ. Its statement of faith affirms the Trinity; the divinity and humanity of Jesus Christ and his virgin birth; humanity’s creation in the image of God, fall into sin, and need for salvation; the sacrificial death and physical resurrection of Jesus; and his future return. The church teaches that salvation is received by grace through faith in Jesus Christ and that believers receive forgiveness of sins and eternal life.

Free Grace United also teaches the existence of heaven and hell and the indwelling and baptism of the Holy Spirit for believers. It regards water baptism as an initial act of obedience following conversion and practices Communion as a remembrance of Christ’s death and resurrection. The church affirms both a universal Christian church consisting of believers from all nations and local congregations organized for worship, evangelism, and fellowship.

== History ==
Free Grace United traces its origins to 2004, when Eric and Kelly Dykstra established a church plant in Elk River, Minnesota, after being sent by Grace Fellowship Church in Brooklyn Park. The congregation initially met in rented facilities and was known as Woodland Fellowship before becoming The Crossing at Woodland Fellowship later that year. The church subsequently developed a recovery ministry and expanded its weekend services.

In 2009, The Crossing purchased a permanent facility in Elk River and began expanding into surrounding communities. A satellite congregation was established in Zimmerman in October 2009, followed by a congregation in Big Lake in 2010. The church subsequently established additional congregations in Minnesota.

The Elk River congregation expanded its facility between 2012 and 2014. In 2014, the remodeled and expanded facility opened, providing additional lobby space, a larger auditorium and additional parking. The congregation also developed Free Grace Bible College as a ministry for theological and ministry education. By the late 2010s, The Crossing had developed multiple congregations in Minnesota. In 2018, the church reported establishing five new churches and announced a goal of establishing 100 churches by 2040. Church leaders described the expansion as a shift away from concentrating ministry at the Elk River congregation toward establishing locally oriented churches in different communities.

On March 31, 2019, The Crossing changed its name to Free Grace United. The change accompanied a new emphasis on planting local churches with their own pastors while maintaining a common mission, vision and values across the congregations.

In 2020, Free Grace United established a congregation in Brooklyn Park, Minnesota. Converge lists the church plant as beginning on October 19, 2020.

In 2021, Free Grace United expanded its partnerships beyond Minnesota. The organization partnered with Fresh Water Ministries to establish four churches in Kenya. It also continued developing congregations in Minnesota, including ministry in the Mille Lacs County Jail.

In 2022, Free Grace United expanded its church-planting activities into Iowa and Pakistan. The organization partnered with pastors in Pakistan beginning January 1, 2022. In February, it acquired Pine Lake Camps in Eldora, Iowa, and established a Free Grace United congregation at the camp. Additional Iowa congregations were established in communities including Albia and Chariton.

In 2023, Free Grace United expanded its international network through partnerships in Liberia and India. In February, it partnered with Elwood and Yatta Jangaba in Liberia, bringing three churches into the organization's international network. In October, it partnered with Fresh Water Ministries to bring churches in India's Andhra Pradesh state into the Free Grace United network.

Free Grace United continued to expand its theological education ministry during the 2020s. Free Grace Bible College operates as a ministry of Free Grace United and provides programs in biblical and theological studies, leadership and ministry. Its Iowa campus opened at Pine Lake Camps in 2022.

By 2025 and 2026, Free Grace United described itself as a multi-congregational church organization in which a central leadership board provides structure and support while individual congregations have their own lead pastors and local ministry structures. The Elk River congregation remained the organization's oldest and largest congregation and the location from which its services are broadcast.

In 2026, Free Grace United launched its first location in Wisconsin. It also began "Ask Anything with Eric & Kelly", a podcast and video series hosted by founding pastors Eric and Kelly Dykstra addressing questions about Christianity, the Bible and theology.

During this period, Free Grace United continued its church-planting activities in the United States and internationally. Converge reported that the organization had congregations in Minnesota, Iowa, Wisconsin, Kenya and Pakistan and that its stated long-term goal was to establish 100 churches by 2040. The church continued to operate under a central Leadership Board while allowing individual congregations to retain their own pastors and local ministry structures. Elk River remained the organization's original and largest congregation and the location from which its weekly services were broadcast.

== Ministries and Outreach ==
=== Free Grace Bible College ===
Free Grace Bible College (formerly known as The Crossing College) began in 2013 to provide an opportunity for people to grow in their faith. This is a church-based college that meets once a week. Courses teach Biblical and Theological Studies, Leadership and Ministry Training, Personal Development and Spiritual Formation, and Internship through three programs: a Diploma in Biblical Studies, an Associates in Christian Leadership and Ministry, and a Certificate in Advanced Theological Studies.

=== Free Grace Recovery ===
Free Grace Recovery is a 12-step, faith-based recovery group that "gives people a safe place to find freedom from anything: from past pain and present struggles to hard-core addictions." Hundreds of people in the Elk River area, including many teenagers, have found freedom from all kinds of addictions through the program.

=== Pine Lake Camps ===
In 2022, FGU purchased Pine Lake Camps in Eldora, Iowa. Pine Lake Camps was originally founded in 1956 by Converge North Central. The current facility has 49 acres, 34 buildings, an in-ground swimming pool, high ropes course, 200 seat chapel, and a pastor's retreat cabin, along with a variety of outdoor activities. Over the past 60+ years, Pine Lake Camps has hosted many adults and students with retreats and summer camp, with an average of 500 campers each summer. Over the camp's decades-long ministry, thousands of people have professed decisions to follow Jesus.

=== Teresa Mission Center ===
FGU helps support an orphanage in Kenya which is led and operated by Pastor Timothy and Teresa Nyandika, pastors at the FGU churches in Kenya. This mission center presently houses 50 kids of all ages. In 2022, their first child from the Mission Center was accepted to University.

== Published works ==
=== Books ===
==== Grace on Tap ====
Pastor Eric Dykstra released his first book, Grace on Tap, in Fall of 2013. The book explains how God's approval does not depend on behavior; God's grace is free and unlimited for followers of Jesus.

==== The People Mover ====
Pastor Kelly Dykstra's book The People Mover was released in May 2015. The People Mover describes an "effortless faith" that occurs when you choose to let God carry you through life instead of relying solely on your own efforts.

==== Unhooked and Untangled ====
Pastor Eric Dykstra and Pastor Bruce Rauma of Legacy Church co-wrote Unhooked & Untangled: A Guide to Finding Freedom from your Vices, Addictions, and Bad Habits in June 2014. Unhooked and Untangled is a practical, step-by-step guide to breaking addictions and walking into the "full and satisfying life that God has for you."

==== How To Twirl: A Lovely Way to Live ====
Pastor Kelly Dykstra's book How To Twirl: A Lovely Way to Live was released in April 2017. Readers are encouraged to "Treat this guide as if you’re sitting down with a big cup of coffee and your very best friend so she can pour wisdom into your life."

==== Happy Marriage lol: A 30-Day He Said/She Said Devotional For Couples ====
Pastor Jason Keech and his wife, Tracy, lead the Zimmerman location of FGU, and wrote this book in 2018 to give practical support and biblical guidance for couples.

==== Who Am I?: Why Am I Here? How Do I Live It Out? ====
Published in 2019, Pastor Silas Austin's book was written to help people find answers to the biggest questions in life.

==== God's Perspective: 60 Important Topics and What God's Word Says about Them ====
Senior Pastor Eric Dykstra published a book in April 2021 "to give Jesus-followers the places in Scripture where God addresses many of our biggest questions in life".

==== What Is the Bible? ====
In 2021, Pastor Karli Phelps published a book to be an "interactive crash course on the Good Book".

==== Quick Bible Guide: A Simple Intro to Every Book in Scripture ====
In 2025, Pastor Eric Dykstra published a simple guide to the books of the Bible. Based on a year-long Bible overview series that was taught to all FGU churches in 2024, the book gives a one- or two-page breakdown of each of the 66 books of the Bible to help with personal study.

=== Albums ===
==== Grace is Life ====
Free Grace Worship's first full-length album, Grace is Life, was created and produced at Free Grace United by church staff and volunteers. It contains music that attempts to "resonate with our culture and the good news of God's grace".

==== Found My Worth ====
The songs on Free Grace Worships's second album are meant to encourage worshippers while reminding them that Jesus' sacrifice on the cross is what determines each individual's value.

==== Start a Fire ====
This album, produced in October 2019, includes 13 tracks, most of which are Free Grace Worship originals.
