= Steven Keillor =

American historian (born 1948)

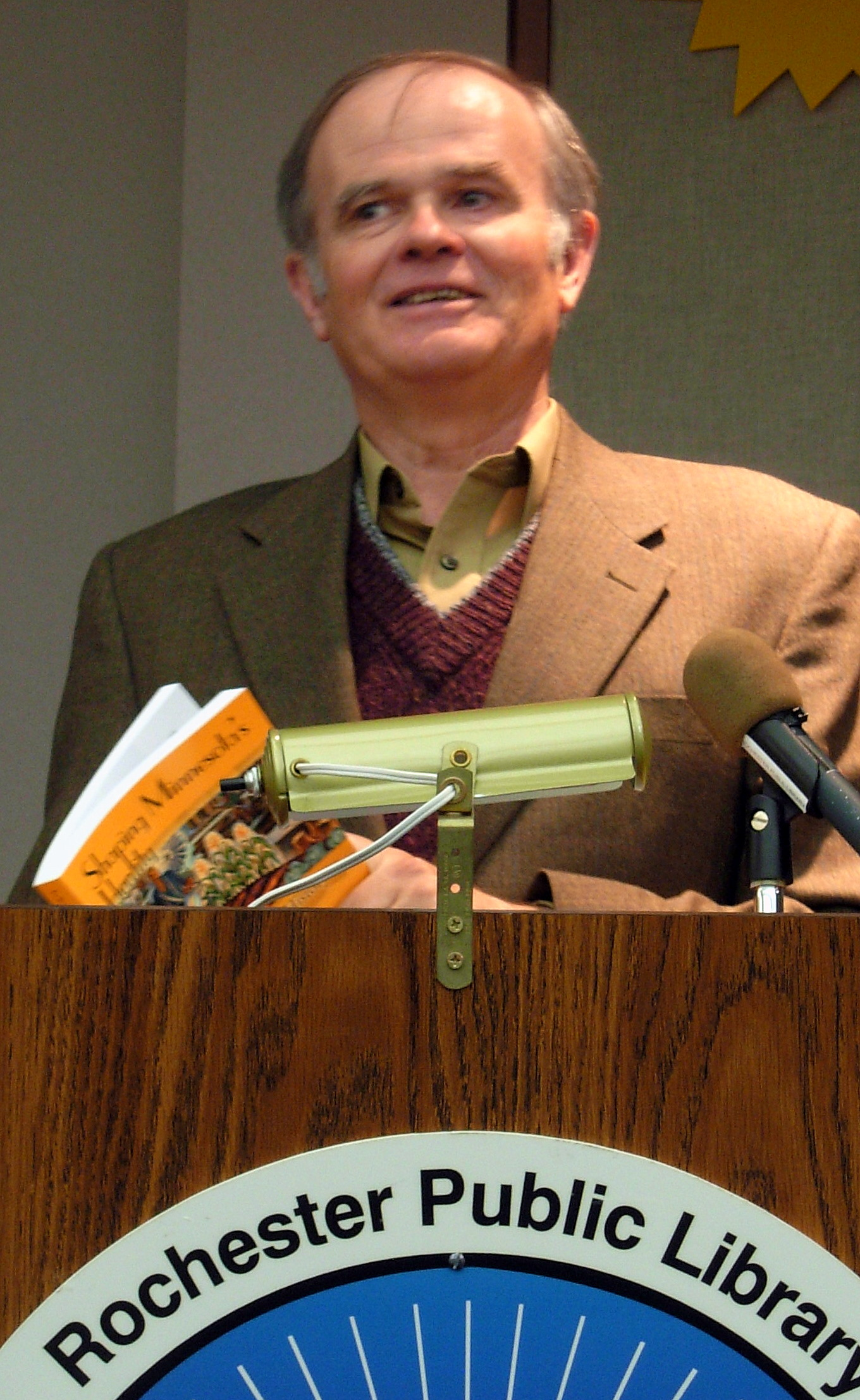
Steven Keillor in 2008

Steven James Keillor (born April 25, 1948) is a Minnesota historian and author. He received his B.A., M.A., and Ph.D. in American History from the University of Minnesota; currently, he is an adjunct professor at Bethel University. He lives in Askov, Minnesota and is the brother of Garrison Keillor.

== Bibliography ==
- Hjalmar Petersen of Minnesota: the Politics of Provincial Independence. St. Paul: Minnesota Historical Society Press. 1987. ISBN 0-87351-211-1.
- This Rebellious House: American History & the Truth of Christianity. Downers Grove, Illinois: InterVarsity Press. 1996. ISBN 0-8308-1877-4.
- Cooperative Commonwealth: Co-ops in Rural Minnesota, 1859-1939. St. Paul: Minnesota Historical Society Press. 2000. ISBN 0-87351-377-0.
- Grand Excursion: Antebellum America Discovers the Upper Mississippi. Afton, Minnesota: Afton Historical Society Press. 2004. ISBN 1-890434-63-9.
- God's Judgments: Interpreting History and the Christian Faith. Downers Grove, Illinois: IVP Academic. 2007. ISBN 978-0-8308-2565-3.
- Shaping Minnesota's Identity: 150 Years of State History. Pogo Press. 2007. ISBN 978-1-880654-37-8.
- Transforming the World: Rochester at 150. Encino, California: Cherbo Pub. Group. 2007. ISBN 978-1-882933-81-5.
- Basis of Belief: a Century of Drama and Debate at the University of Minnesota. Lakeville, Minnesota: Pogo Press. 2008. ISBN 978-1-880654-40-8.
