= Kelly Moller =

American politician

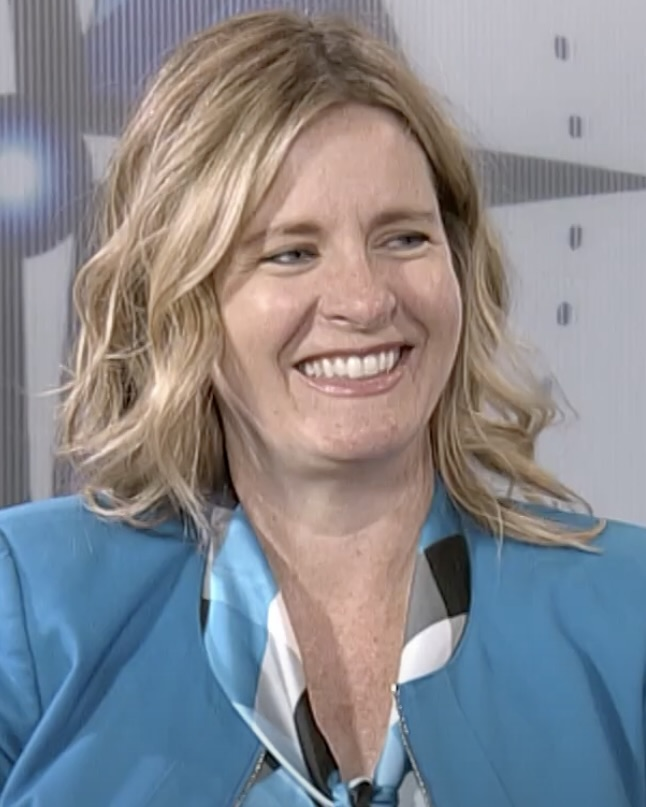

Member of the Minnesota House of Representatives from the 40A district
- Incumbent
- Assumed office January 8, 2019
- Preceded by: Randy Jessup
- Succeeded by: Aisha Elmquist (elect)

Personal details
- Born: February 1, 1973 (age 53)
- Party: Democratic (DFL)
- Spouse: Kevin
- Children: 2
- Education: University of Notre Dame (B.B.A.); Hamline University School of Law (J.D.)
- Occupation: Attorney; Legislator
- Website: Government website Campaign website

Kelly Moller (born February 2, 1972) is an American politician serving in the Minnesota House of Representatives since 2019. A member of the Minnesota Democratic–Farmer–Labor Party (DFL), Moller represents District 40A in the north-central Twin Cities metropolitan area, which includes the cities of Mounds View and Shoreview and parts of Ramsey County, Minnesota.

== Early life, education, and career ==
Moller attended the University of Notre Dame, graduating with a Bachelor of Business Administration in marketing and later Hamline University School of Law, graduating with a Juris Doctor.

Moller worked as a staff attorney in the Minnesota Attorney General's Office for a decade, is a victims' rights activist, and works as an assistant attorney for Hennepin County, Minnesota. She served on the Shoreview City Public Safety Committee.

== Minnesota House of Representatives ==
Moller was elected to the Minnesota House of Representatives in 2018 and has been reelected every two years since. She defeated one-term Republican incumbent Randy Jessup.

Moller chairs the Public Safety Finance and Policy Committee and the Ethics Committee. She sits on the Judiciary Finance and Civil Law, Rules and Legislative Administration, and Ways and Means Committees. She served as vice chair of the Judiciary Finance and Civil Law Committee from 2021 to 2022.

=== Political positions ===
==== Public safety ====
As Public Safety chair, Moller has supported offering more resources for police recruitment and retention as well as funding for community crime and violence prevention. She has said that the state's criminal justice system has done "a pretty bad job" at rehabilitation. After the police shooting of Daunte Wright, Moller supported legislation to limit police powers during traffic stops, including banning officers from pulling drivers over for having tinted windows, outdated tabs, or loud mufflers.

Moller supports "red flag laws", also known as extreme risk protection orders, and supported efforts to compile a database of mass shootings in the United States. In response to rising car thefts, she wrote a bill that would allow police departments to track stolen vehicles for 24 hours without first getting consent from owners. She authored changes to civil forfeiture laws for cases ending forfeitures worth less than $1,500 in most cases.

===== Sexual harassment and assault laws =====
Moller has supported updating and strengthening Minnesota's sexual assault and harassment laws, citing testimony from survivors about problems with the current system. She supported legislation eliminating the "severe or pervasive" standard for determining whether harassment creates a hostile working environment.

In 2021, the Minnesota Supreme Court ruled that a person who is sexually assaulted while intoxicated is not considered "mentally incapacitated" if they consumed the substance voluntarily. Moller introduced a bill that would amend the relevant statute to include victims such as those in the case the court ruled on, and said it was "an example of victim blaming". The bill gained bipartisan support and passed later that year.

Moller authored bipartisan legislation to require law-enforcement agencies to follow a state-issued policy on how to best investigate sexual assault cases. She also introduced a bill to form a working group, including representatives from victim coalitions, to examine and rewrite criminal sexual conduct laws. The Peace Officers Standards and Training (POST) Board adopted similar policies, and Moller authored a bill requiring departments to follow the guidance, with officers that failed facing consequences including losing their police officer's license. Many of the working group's recommendations were implemented in a bipartisan bill passed in 2021.

Moller called Minneapolis's backlog of untested rape kits "unacceptable" and pledged to work to get them tested, and supported a state supreme court ruling protecting communications between victims and sexual assault counselors. She authored legislation to repeal a law from Minnesota's territorial days that criminalized adultery that only applied to women, not men.

In response to multiple reported instances of sexual harassment at the Capitol by legislators and lobbyists, Moller sponsored a bill to broaden what qualifies as harassment which passed the House but failed to move forward in the Republican-controlled Senate. She also authored legislation to require the Bureau of Criminal Apprehension to investigate allegations of sexual assault by officers.

==== Other political positions ====
Moller authored legislation to increase transparency around ticket prices, requiring upfront pricing and regulating ticket resellers. She said the legislation, H.F. 1989, was inspired by issues experienced during the sale of tickets on Ticketmaster for Taylor Swift's "Eras" Tour in 2023.

== Electoral history ==
2018 Minnesota State House - District 42A
Party	Candidate	Votes	%
Democratic (DFL)	Kelly Moller	12,289	57.52
Republican	Randy Jessup (incumbent)	9,055	42.38
Write-in		22	0.10
Total votes		21,366	100.0
Democratic (DFL) gain from Republican			

2020 Minnesota State House - District 42A
Party	Candidate	Votes	%
Democratic (DFL)	Kelly Moller (incumbent)	14,982	60.72
Republican	Candy Sina	9,659	39.15
Write-in		32	0.13
Total votes		24,673	100.0
Democratic (DFL) hold			

2022 Minnesota State House - District 40A
Party	Candidate	Votes	%
Democratic (DFL)	Kelly Moller (incumbent)	12,302	61.61
Republican	Ben Schwanke	7,652	38.32
Write-in		14	0.07
Total votes		19,968	100.0
Democratic (DFL) hold			

== Personal life ==
Moller and her husband, Kevin, have two children. She resides in Shoreview, Minnesota.
