= Brachypanorpa carolinensis =

Scientific classification
- Domain: Eukaryota
- Kingdom: Animalia
- Phylum: Arthropoda
- Class: Insecta
- Order: Mecoptera
- Family: Panorpodidae
- Genus: Brachypanorpa
- Species: B. carolinensis

Binomial name
- Brachypanorpa carolinensis (Banks, 1905)

Species of insect

Brachypanorpa carolinensis, the short-nosed scorpionfly, is a species of scorpionfly in the family Panorpodidae. It is found in eastern North America.
