= Randy Jessup =

American politician

Member of the Minnesota House of Representatives from the 42A district
- In office January 3, 2017 – January 8, 2019
- Preceded by: Barb Yarusso
- Succeeded by: Kelly Moller

Personal details
- Born: 1960 or 1961 (age 64–65)
- Party: Republican Party of Minnesota
- Spouse: Jan
- Children: 3
- Education: Bethel University; University of Minnesota
- Occupation: Small business owner

Randy Jessup (born 1960/61) is an American politician and former member of the Minnesota House of Representatives. A member of the Republican Party of Minnesota, he represented District 42A in the northeastern Twin Cities metropolitan area.

== Early life, education, and career ==
Jessup attended Bethel University, graduating with a Bachelor of Arts in pre-engineering. He later attended the University of Minnesota, graduating with a Bachelor of Science in chemical engineering and later a Master of Business Administration in marketing.

Jessup was an executive for Pillsbury, Quaker Oats, and Ecolab. He owns four UPS stores. He was a member of the UPS franchisee advisory committee for eight years and was its chair for four years.

== Minnesota House of Representatives ==
Jessup was elected to the Minnesota House of Representatives in 2016, defeating Minnesota Democratic–Farmer–Labor Party (DFL) incumbent Barb Yarusso. He served one term before being defeated by Democrat Kelly Moller in 2018.

== Personal life ==
Jessup and his wife, Jan, reside in Shoreview, Minnesota. They have three children.
