= College Ave Church =

- College Avenue Baptist Church
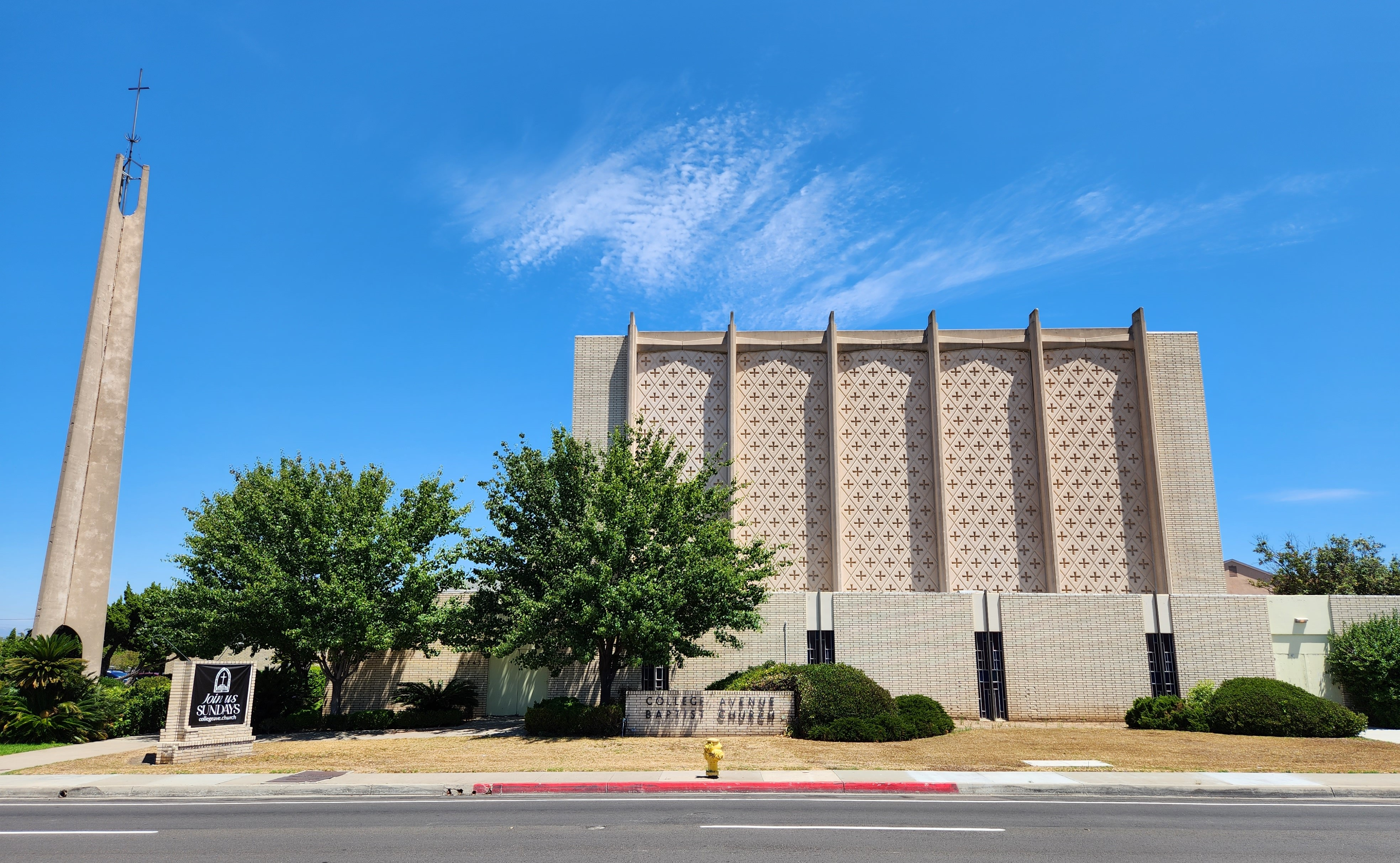
- College Ave Church in 2023
- College Ave Church
- 32°45′53.503″N 117°4′0.682″W
- Location: 4747 College Ave, San Diego, California 92115
- Country: United States
- Denomination: Converge
- Previous denomination: Southern California Baptist Convention, American Baptist Convention, Swedish Baptist Churches of America
- Website: collegeave.church

History
- Founded: 1892
- Founder: Augustus Orgren

College Ave Church is a Baptist church located in San Diego, California. It is affiliated with Converge (formerly the Baptist General Conference) and has been pastored by Christopher Hilken since 2023.

== History ==
=== Origins and the Swedish Pioneer Era (1891–1908) ===
The congregation traces its origins to the arrival of Rev. Augustus Bernhard Orgren in San Diego on November 25, 1891. A native of Sweden and an alumnus of the Royal Academy of Music in Stockholm and Bethel Seminary in Chicago, Orgren established a ministry directed toward the growing community of Swedish immigrants. Property was acquired at the corner of 19th and H Streets (present-day Market Street) for $1,600 and Bethel Swedish Baptist Church was officially dedicating on October 20, 1892, with support from the Southern California Baptist Convention.

Following Orgren's departure in 1897, Rev. Nils Peter Palmquist assumed leadership with a salary of $600 per year. Palmquist was also a native of Sweden but his tenure was cut short by health complications and he left the church in 1899. Palmquist moved to Oakland where he died in 1907 but it was there that his daughter Nina met and eventually married Earl Warren.

On August 26 of the following year, Rev. Carl Johan Christianson was called as pastor. However, the church struggled to pay his salary of $25 per month and on November 24, 1901 held their last meeting at the building at 19th and H Street. The 15 remaining members continued to meet though and the church reorganized on September 16, 1907 under the leadership of visiting minister Fredrick Nelson, adopting the name Swedish Bethel Baptist Church.

=== The Early Pastoral Successions (1908–1925) ===
Arriving in San Diego in February 1908 following a unanimous call from the congregation's nine surviving members, Carl Mauritz Nelson continued the tradition of Swedish immigrant leadership, having been born in Sweden before immigrating to the United States. In 1909, the church purchased a vacant lot at the corner of 16th and E Streets for $2,500 where they constructed a simple building that served as their home for the next three decades.

The simplicity of the structure drew a citation from the Board of Health in 1911 for lacking a public sewer connection. Positioned just six blocks from the more prominent First Baptist Church, and constrained by maintaining strictly Swedish-language services, the ministry faced difficulties engaging younger demographics. When Nelson departed in February 1911, membership stood at 36, with an annual income of $1,131.

Karl Erland Byleen, the fifth pastor, remains unique as the only bachelor to serve the congregation. Born in Sweden, he attended Bible school there before finishing his education at Bethel Seminary. Known for his intense dedication—exemplified on one occasion when he walked the entire distance from downtown San Diego to El Cajon to reach a prospective convert—the 30-year-old pastor concentrated heavily on youth engagement. Byleen established "Första Svenska Ungdomsföreningen-Hoppets Stjerna" (The Star of Hope — First Swedish Young People’s Society), which actively raised funds for church electrification. Byleen concluded his brief tenure later in 1913.

Following a successful "proof-preached" sermon before 50 members on February 22, 1914, John Amandus Carlson accepted a unanimous call supported by a $900 annual salary (partially subsidized by the Southern California Baptist Convention). Also a Swedish native and Bethel Seminary alumnus, Carlson earned the affectionate moniker "the weeping Carlson" among fellow ministers due to his emotional tenderness. During his seven-year pastorate, membership averaged 60, operating without a formal budget and relying on individual financial appeals and strict disciplinary committees. Alongside routine church administration, Carlson led the congregation in adopting a formal petition to President Woodrow Wilson in April 1918 advocating for the wartime cessation of liquor manufacturing. Carlson left the church in 1921.

Rev. Karl Johanson assumed leadership eight months after Carlson's departure, arriving during the early era of commercial radio and automobile expansion. Also a native of Stockholm who had lived in Canada and the United States, Johanson accepted a $1,400 annual salary. His pastorate coincided with a pivotal linguistic transition. As younger generations grew increasingly frustrated with lengthy Swedish sermons, Johanson attempted bilingual services, though his delivery often blended both languages awkwardly. Recognizing the changing cultural landscape, Johanson stepped down in 1925 to pave the way for English integration.

=== Transition and Relocation (1925–1948) ===
The subsequent was Danish-born Rev. Edward Carneh, the first non-Swedish pastor in the church's thirty year history. Carneh initiated gradual English integration and advocated for the importance of teaching in a language that the children of the church would understand. He taught the main sermon in Swedish but also included a sermonette in English as well. Though this was controversial at the time, it did eventually lead to the complete adoption of English-language services on January 1, 1935. Carneh left the church only a few months before this transition was complete.

Pastor Victor Johnson assumed leadership as the ninth pastor and the first born in the United States. He had previously led a charismatic church and, in an attempt to not be considered a church for only Swedish immigrants, rebranded the church as Evangel Baptist Church. Church membership reached a record high of 86 under Johnson in 1937, but he left shortly thereafter in March 1938.

In June 1938, H. Lewis Coates, a professional Bible teacher who already lived in San Diego, assumed pastoral duties. Coates most lasting contribution during his brief stent was in leading the congregation to purchase property at College and Adams Avenues near San Diego State University. The old property at the northeast corner of 16th and E Street was sold for $2,500; the new property and chapel cost the church $16,000. Coates retired after 15 months of leadership.

In January 1940, Rev. Edwin Greene, only 27 years old at the time, succeeded Coates. On July 28, 1940, the congregation dedicated its new facility and officially adopted the name College Avenue Baptist Church. The post-World War II era brought substantial expansion under Greene's leadership, including active outreach to military personnel, the establishment of the local San Diego Youth for Christ chapter, and significant membership growth that reached 434 individuals by 1948. Strategic land acquisitions during this period secured adjacent property for future campus development.

During this period the church board was presented the opportunity to acquire a large piece of adjacent property which represented the church's sole viable expansion corridor. The previous owner was a developer who no longer wanted the property after being told the city would not build a road to connect the property to any existing street. The board initially demurred, citing a lack of existing capital and anticipated resistance from the wider congregation, voting twice and rejecting the motion both times. Following a recess dedicated to prayer and fellowship, the board chair declared his intention to purchase the acreage independently if the board declined to endorse it. This resolute stance prompted a third vote, which passed unanimously; the acquisition subsequently received unanimous ratification from the congregation. The San Diego City Planning Commission ultimately approved the infrastructure extension, incorporating the tract via Arosa Street.

=== Expansion and Campus Growth (1949–1981) ===
Rev. Milo Nixon began his seventeen-year pastorate in August 1949, initiating an extensive building campaign. A new sanctuary (later designated Fellowship Hall) was dedicated on April 2, 1950, followed by the construction of additional educational and fellowship facilities throughout the decade. To accommodate a growing congregation that exceeded 1,200 members by the early 1960s, the church authorized the construction of a larger sanctuary and administrative complex in January 1963. A loan for $650,000 was taken out to pay for the new buildings and was repaid 23 years later. By the church's 75th anniversary in 1967, membership had reached 1,428.

Dr. Robert "Bob" Luther succeeded Nixon in 1968, guiding the institution through another major phase of development. During Luther's thirteen-year tenure, the church launched the College Avenue Preschool (1976), The Student Center (1976), and the Family Center (1981), alongside hosting theological education programs associated with Bethel Seminary West. By the close of his tenure, membership approached 3,000.

=== Recent History and Contemporary Leadership (1982–Present) ===
Dr. John Daniel Baumann assumed leadership on May 2, 1982 following eight years as a professor of preaching at Bethel Seminary. During his tenure, the church maintained unique cultural traditions from its Swedish immigrant roots, including an annual early morning Swedish Christmas service (Julotta) and gatherings featuring traditional Swedish hymns. Baumann left the church early in 1989.

In May 1989, Dr. Gerald Sheveland succeeded Baumann. He set a vision for the church "to win, equip and deploy committed followers of Jesus Christ who will share His love and truth from San Diego to the ends of the earth." Under Sheveland's dynamic leadership, the church reached its historical peak, with weekly attendance surpassing 4,000 across seven distinct services. To accommodate this expansion, the Centennial Education Center was dedicated in 1993, aligning with the institution's 100th anniversary. Sheveland departed in 1997 to lead the Baptist General Conference (renamed Converge and his leadership) and the church entered a prolonged and challenging transitional era.

A multi-year pulpit vacancy and lack of centralized leadership led to administrative silos and internal factionalism. In 2001, a search process which took three years resulted in the hiring of the sixteenth pastor: Steve Harling. The arrival of Harling made the fractured inworking of the church apparent and several powerful lay members began to pull the organization apart. After two years being fought by the board that called him, Harling left the church. In the three following years, attendance plummeted from 4,000 per week to less than 1,000 per week. It was also during this that the previous college group, known as Flood, became their own church and eventually relocated.

After three years of searching, and the intervention of a prior pastor and current denomination head, before Carlton Harris was hired. Harris sought to reform operations, unify divided factions, and guide the congregation through external challenges (like the Great Recession and the COVID-19 pandemic). These years brought structural strain as the individuals and structures which led to Harling's departure were addressed. The hemorrhage in attendance was slowed to a gradual decline and when Harris left the church in 2021 attendance was about 400 people per week.

In February 2023, Pastor Chris Hilken was called to lead the congregation. His ministry initiated a period of rapid revitalization and growth, positioning the historical institution for continued community impact in San Diego. The congregation rebounded to about 3,000 attendees per week with a new college group of about 1,000 attendees per week.

== Community involvement ==
The church has hosted numerous social events including girl scout meetings, college reunions, weddings, funerals, conferences, and concerts. In 1986 when a San Diego Country sheriff's deputy trainee was killed shortly after joining the academy, her funeral service was held at the church. Kellye Cash, recently having been crowned Miss America, played piano and offered her testimony at a 1987 event at the church. A free seminar on Alzheimer's disease was hosted by the church in 1990. Since 1961 the church has also engaged in numerous humanitarian endeavors in Mexico. During significant rain storms in 2016, the College Ave church hosted relief shelters set up by the American Red Cross.

The sanctuary constructed in 1966 was designed specifically for the hosting of vocal and traditional concerts. Since then, the venue has hosted concerts for the local church choir, San Diego Youth Symphony, San Diego Civic Youth Orchestra, Orchestra of the United States International University, Raga Ranjani School of Music, San Diego Master Choral, and the SDSU Symphony Orchestra. In 1973 a benefit concert for the Cystic Fibrosis Research Foundation was held in the building as well as a City of Hope Cancer Treatment benefit concert which was held in 1987. In 1993 African Sanctus performed on site with the SDSU choir. In 1994 renowned theologian Martin E. Marty featured as the speaker for a conference addressing clergy and health care professionals.

The church has also undertaken numerous church plants throughout its history including Mission Church (became Lincoln Avenue Baptist and then Gateway Community), First Baptist Church Ramona (became Ramona First Baptist), Castle Park Church, Bonita Valley Baptist Church, and Flood Church.
