= Converge (United States) =

Baptist denomination

Converge (Baptist General Conference)
- Classification: Evangelical Christianity
- Orientation: Baptist
- President: John K. Jenkins
- Associations: Baptist World Alliance, National Association of Evangelicals
- Region: United States
- Headquarters: Orlando, Florida, U.S.
- Origin: 1879
- Branched from: Mission Friends
- Congregations: 1,346
- Members: 324,163
- Missionary organization: Converge missions
- Aid organization: Converge crisis response
- Tertiary institutions: Bethel University
- Official website: converge.org

Converge, formerly the Baptist General Conference (BGC) and Converge Worldwide, is a Baptist Christian denomination in the United States. It is affiliated with the Baptist World Alliance and the National Association of Evangelicals. The headquarters are in Orlando, Florida. The current president of Converge is John K. Jenkins.

== History ==
The Baptist General Conference grew out of the great revival of the 19th century, but its roots can be traced back to Radical Pietism in Sweden. In 1852 Gustaf Palmquist emigrated from Sweden to the United States. Forty-seven days after his arrival, he and three others organized a Swedish Baptist church in Rock Island, Illinois. Fredrik (F.O.) Nilsson, who was instrumental in leading Palmquist to Baptist views, arrived in America the next year with 21 immigrants. Some of these united with the Rock Island church, while others organized a church at Houston, Minnesota. Nilsson traveled widely, founding and strengthening churches. Anders Wiberg was another pioneer among these churches from 1852 until 1855, when he returned to Sweden as a missionary. It also had influence from and a partial connection with fellow Pietists and Radical Pietists of different denominational traditions within the Mission Friends movement.

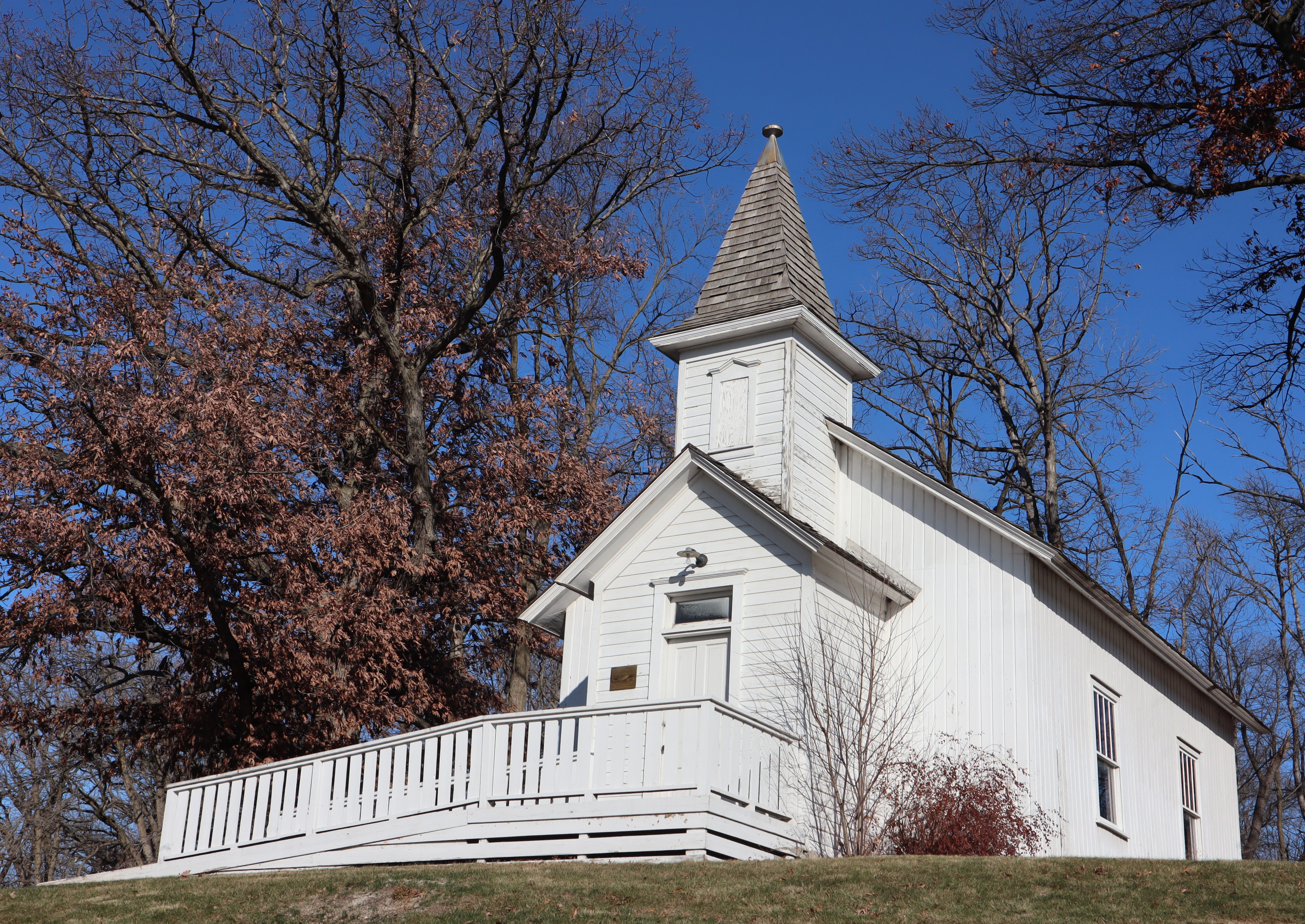
Historic Swedish Baptist Church, moved to Bethel Seminary from Scandia, Minnesota

Christian experience was a major emphasis among these Swedish Baptists, and they prospered from the awakenings in the 19th century. Immigration, aggressive evangelism and conversion through revivals brought rapid growth to the denomination. John Alexis Edgren founded the Swedish Baptist Seminary (now Bethel University) in Chicago, Illinois in 1871.

In 1879, when the Swedish churches had grown to 65 in number, they formed a General Conference. The members of these churches assimilated into American society and gradually lost their separate ethnic identity. By 1940, most churches were English-speaking. In 1945, the Swedish Baptist General Conference dropped "Swedish" from its name and became the Baptist General Conference of America. Swedish Baptists had maintained an alliance with the American Baptist Publication Society, American Baptist home and foreign missions, etc., and later the Northern Baptist Convention. Some Swedish Baptists expected to merge with that body, but the groups moved toward different developments of theological emphasis. The conservative Swedish Baptists pulled back from growing liberalism of the Northern Baptists, and in 1944 formed their own Board of Foreign Missions. This moved them toward independent existence, which they have maintained to the present.

From its beginning among Scandinavian immigrants, the BGC has grown to a nationwide association of autonomous churches with at least 17 ethnic groups and missions in 35 nations. The Baptist General Conference adopted the new movement name of Converge Worldwide in 2008, and was renamed to Converge in 2015.

== Statistics ==
According to a census published by the denomination in 2023, it claimed 1,346 churches and 324,163 members.

== Beliefs ==
The denomination has a Baptist confession of faith. It is a member of the Baptist World Alliance.

== Schools ==
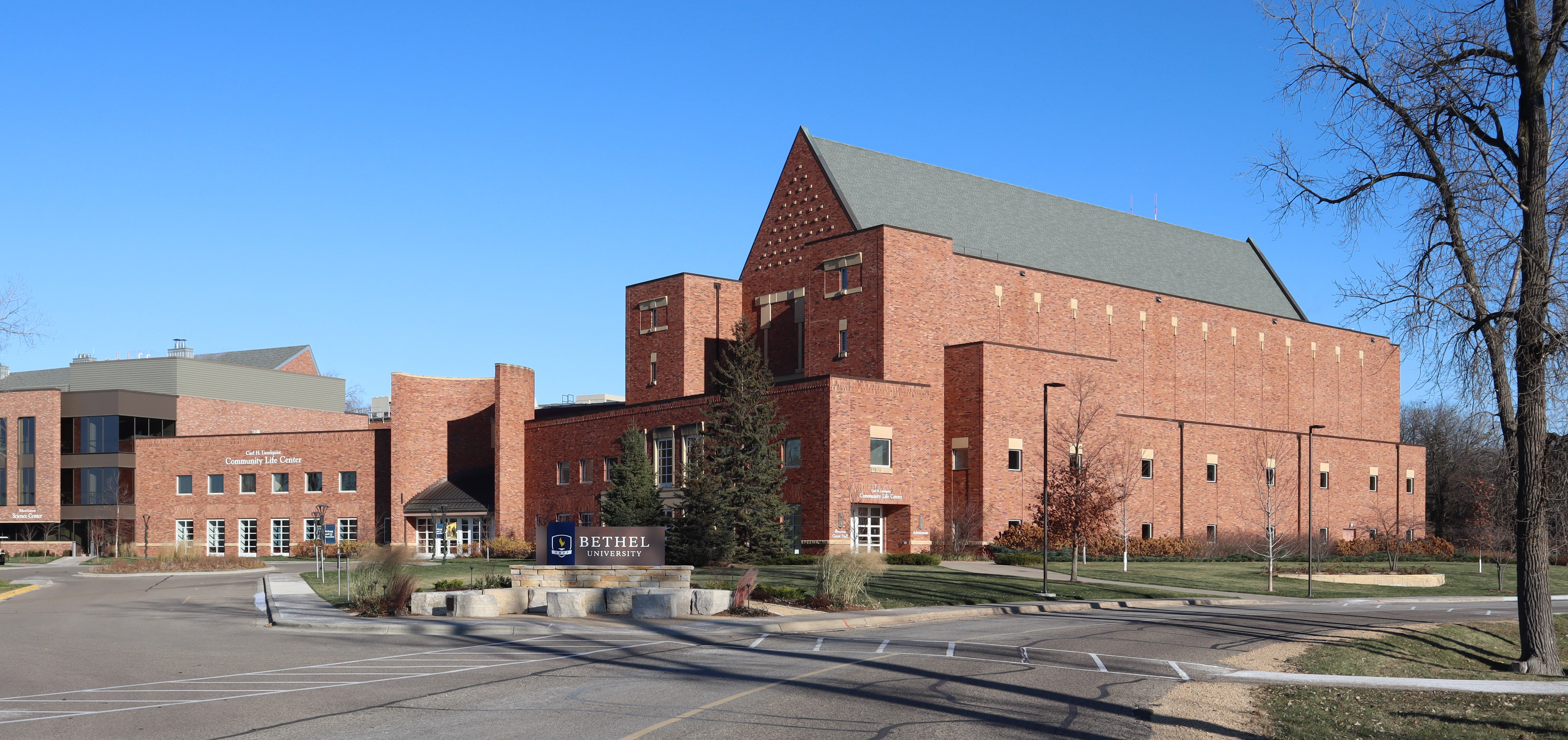
Bethel University in Minnesota

Converge operates the Bethel Theological Seminary and Bethel University in Arden Hills, Minnesota near St. Paul.

== Missionary organization ==
The Convention has a missionary organization, Converge International Ministries.

== Humanitarian organization ==
It has a humanitarian organization, Converge crisis response.

== Notable Members ==
- John Piper - theologian, professor of biblical studies at Bethel University, and pastor at Bethlehem Baptist Church (Minneapolis).
- Bob Merritt - former senior pastor of Eagle Brook Church in suburban Minneapolis-St. Paul.
- Jerry Sheveland - former senior pastor of College Ave Church in San Diego and president of Converge from 2002-2014.

== See also ==
- Baptist Union of Sweden
- North American Baptist Conference

== Sources ==
- Glenmary Research Center. Religious Congregations & Membership in the United States, 2000
- McBeth, H. Leon. The Baptist Heritage: Four Centuries of Baptist Witness
- Olson, Adolf. A Centenary History as Related to the Baptist General Conference
- Wardin, Albert W. Jr. Baptists Around the World
