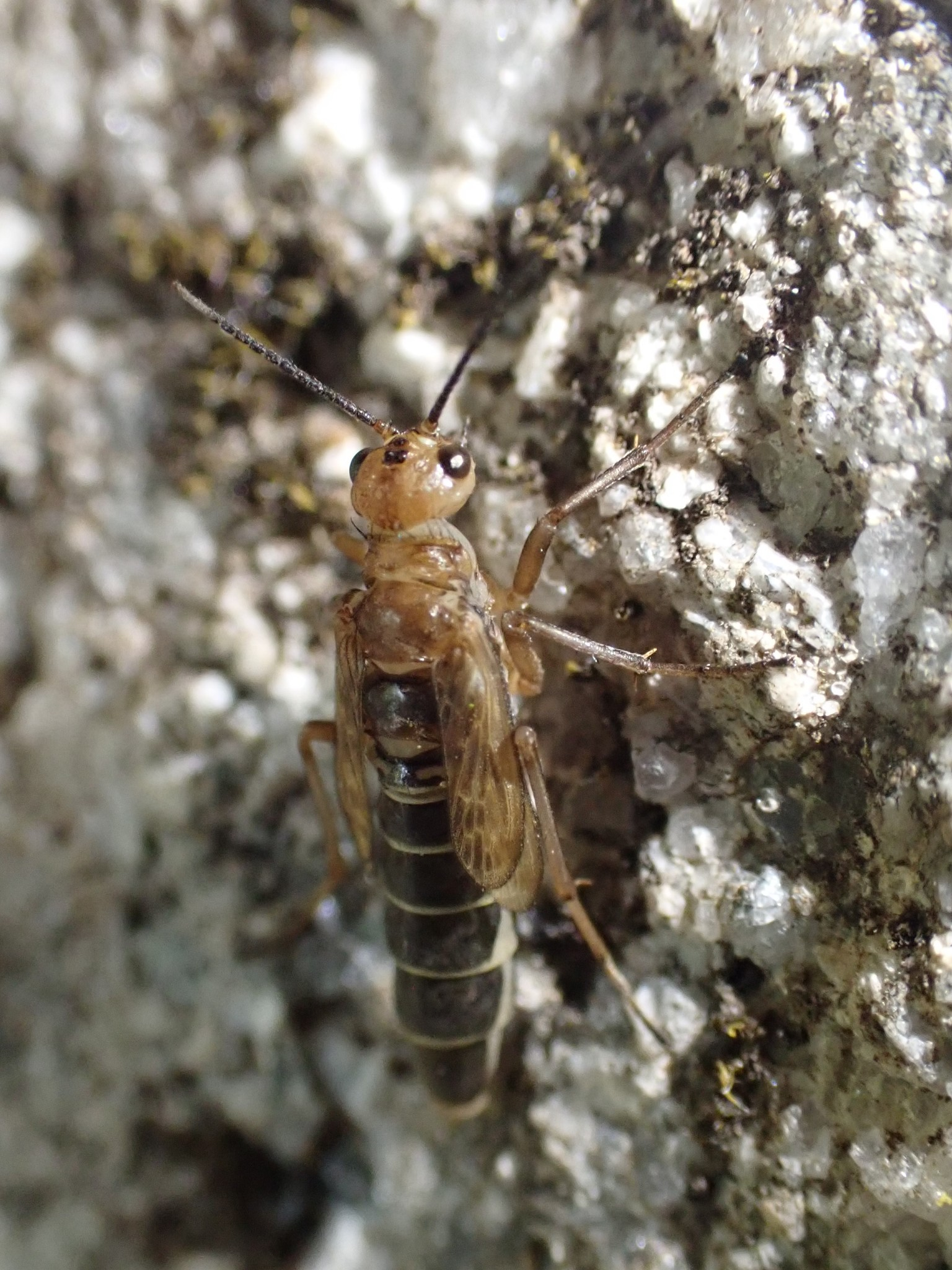
- Brachypanorpa montana

Scientific classification
- Domain: Eukaryota
- Kingdom: Animalia
- Phylum: Arthropoda
- Class: Insecta
- Order: Mecoptera
- Family: Panorpodidae
- Genus: Brachypanorpa; Carpenter, 1931

Species
- See text

= Brachypanorpa =

Genus of insects

Brachypanorpa is a genus of scorpionflies in the family Panorpodidae. There are about five described species in Brachypanorpa.

== Species ==
These five species belong to the genus Brachypanorpa:

- Brachypanorpa carolinensis (Banks, 1905) (short-nosed scorpionfly)
- Brachypanorpa jeffersoni Byers, 1976
- Brachypanorpa montana Carpenter, 1931
- Brachypanorpa oregonensis (MacLachlan, 1881)
- Brachypanorpa sacajawea Byers, 1990
