= Abby and Brittany Hensel =

American conjoined twins (born 1990)

- Born: Abigail Loraine Hensel; Brittany Lee Hensel; March 7, 1990 (age 36); New Germany, Minnesota, U.S.
- Education: Bethel University
- Occupation: Teachers

Abigail Loraine Hensel and Brittany Lee Hensel (born March 7, 1990) are American conjoined twins. They are dicephalic parapagus twins (having two heads joined to one torso), and are highly symmetrical for conjoined twins. Each has a heart, stomach, pair of lungs, spine, and spinal cord. Each twin controls one arm and one leg. When they were infants, learning to crawl, walk, and clap required cooperation. They can eat, write and speak separately and simultaneously. Activities such as running, swimming, hair-brushing, playing piano or volleyball, riding a bicycle, or driving a car require cooperation.

The twins' lives have been covered in the popular media, including Life magazine and The Oprah Winfrey Show. They were interviewed on The Learning Channel in December 2006, discussing their daily lives and future plans. They starred in their own reality television series, Abby & Brittany, on TLC in 2012.

Since 2013, the sisters have been teachers in Minnesota.

== Background ==
The Hensel sisters were born in Carver County, Minnesota, to Patty, a registered nurse, and Mike Hensel, a carpenter and landscaper. They have a younger brother and sister. They were raised in New Germany, Minnesota, attended Mayer Lutheran High School in Mayer, Minnesota, and graduated from Bethel University in St. Paul in 2012.

== Physiology and coordination ==
The twins have a single body with separate heads and necks, a chest that is wider than average, two arms, and two legs. At birth, they had a rudimentary arm between the bases of their necks attached to a shoulder blade at the back. It was removed, leaving the shoulder blade.

Abby's head tilts laterally outward about 5 degrees to the right, while Brittany's tilts laterally at about 15 degrees to the left, causing her to appear shorter even when seated. Brittany's leg is nearly two inches shorter than Abby's, and Brittany tends to stand and walk on tip-toe, which has made her calf muscle significantly larger than Abby's. The continued growth of Abby's spine was surgically halted after Brittany prematurely stopped growing. At age 12, they underwent surgery at Gillette Children's Specialty Healthcare to correct scoliosis and to expand their chest cavity to prevent breathing trouble.

Each twin manages one side of their conjoined body. The sense of touch of each is restricted to her body half; this shades off at the midsagittal plane, so that there is a small amount of overlap at the midline. Stomach aches, however, are felt by only the twin on the opposite side. They cooperatively use their limbs when both hands or both legs are required. By coordinating their efforts, they walk, run, swim, play volleyball and the piano, and ride a bicycle normally. Together, they can type on a computer keyboard and drive a car. As teenagers, the twins passed their driver's license exams separately because, although driving requires coordination between them, state law required that they each be licensed. Abby controls the devices on the right side of the driver's seat; Brittany, those on the left. Together they control the steering wheel. Abby, at 5 ft 2 in (1.57 m), is taller and longer of leg than Brittany, who is 4 ft 10 in (1.47 m) and their disparate heights cause difficulty in some activities, for example balancing a Segway, as shown in their 2012 reality series.

=== Organ distribution ===
The twins have individual organs in the upper part of their body, while most of those at and below the navel are shared, the exception being the spinal cord.

- 2 heads
- 2 spines merging at the coccyx and joined at the thorax by sections of ribs. Surgery corrected scoliosis.
- 2 completely separate spinal cords
- 2 arms (originally 3, but the rudimentary central arm was removed, leaving the central shoulder blade in place)
- 1 broad ribcage with 2 highly fused sternums and traces of bridging ribs. Surgery expanded the pleural cavities.
- 2 breasts
- 2 hearts in a shared circulatory system (nutrition, respiration, and medicine taken by either affects both)
- 4 lungs with the medial lungs moderately fused, not involving Brittany's upper right lobe; three pleural cavities
- 1 diaphragm with well coordinated involuntary breathing, slight central defect
- 2 stomachs
- 2 gallbladders
- 1 liver, enlarged and elongated right lobe
- Y-shaped small intestine, with slightly spastic double peristalsis at the juncture
- 1 large intestine (one colon, rectum, and anus)
- 3 kidneys: 2 left, 1 right
- 1 bladder
- 1 set of reproductive organs
- 2 separate half-sacrums, which converge distally
- 1 slightly broad pelvis
- 2 legs

=== Separation surgery declined ===
Upon their birth, the twins' parents decided not to attempt surgical separation after hearing from doctors that it was unlikely that both would survive the operation. As the twins grew and learned to walk and develop other skills, their parents confirmed their decision against separation, arguing that the quality of life for the surviving twin or twins living separately would be less than their quality of life as conjoined people.

== Adulthood ==
Dicephalic parapagus twins rarely survive into adulthood. The Hensel sisters survived and graduated from high school in 2008; they attended college at Bethel University in Arden Hills, Minnesota, majoring in education. They had considered pursuing different concentrations within that major, but the volume of extra coursework was prohibitive. They each graduated with Bachelor of Arts degrees in 2012.

Some of the twins' clothes are altered by a seamstress so that they have two separate necklines, in order to emphasize their individuality. They usually have separate meals, but sometimes share a single meal for the sake of convenience. For tasks such as responding to email, they type and respond as one, anticipating each other's feelings with little verbal communication between them. Their choice of grammatical person is to use "I" when they agree, and to use their names when their responses differ.

They dislike being stared at or photographed by strangers while going about their private lives. In interviews for the Discovery Channel in 2006 at the age of 16, they said that they hoped to date, get married, and have children. They also stated that they hoped that by providing some information about themselves, they would be able to lead otherwise fairly typical social lives.

The two became teachers in 2013, and as of 2025 they continue to teach fifth grade at Sunnyside Elementary in New Brighton, Minnesota. In 2021, Abby married Josh Bowling, a nurse and army veteran; he has a daughter from a previous marriage. Abby and Brittany are reportedly the longest-living dicephalic parapagus conjoined twins.

== Media appearances ==
The twins appeared on The Oprah Winfrey Show on April 8 and 29, 1996. During the same month, they were featured on the cover of Life under the caption "One Body, Two Souls", and their daily lifestyle was described in the article, "The Hensels' Summer". Life followed up with another story in September 1998. In 2002, they appeared in Joined for Life, a TV documentary by Advanced Medical Productions, distributed on the Discovery Health Channel and a 2003 follow-up, Joined at Birth.

In 2003, an updated story of them at age 11 (filmed in 2001) was published in Time and again in Life. ABC TV also did a documentary called "Joined for Life". A UK television special in 2005 was part of the series Extraordinary People. In 2006, Advanced Medical made another documentary, Joined for Life: Abby & Brittany turn 16, that discusses their adolescence, school, social life, and activities such as getting their driver's licenses.

The twins starred in the TLC reality TV show Abby & Brittany that was shown in the US from August to October 2012. It was shown by the BBC in the UK in April and May 2013 and covers the period from their finishing college to starting a part-time teaching job.

== Filmography ==
Documentaries and other television appearances include:

First aired	Title	Distributor	Produced by
April 8, 1996	The Oprah Winfrey Show	King World Productions	Harpo Productions
March 27, 2003	Joined for Life	Discovery Channel	Advanced Medical Productions, American Broadcasting Company
December 17, 2006	Joined for Life: Abby and Brittany Turn 16	TLC	Advanced Medical Productions
February 19, 2007	Extraordinary People: The Twins Who Share a Body	Five (UK)	One North
August 28, 2012	Abby & Brittany	TLC	
