= Barb Yarusso =

American politician (born 1956)

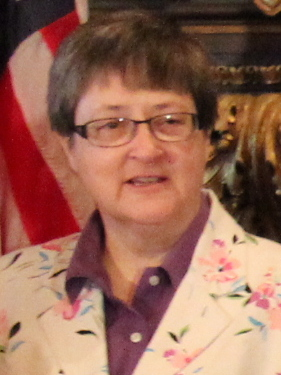

Member of the Minnesota House of Representatives from the 42A district
- In office January 8, 2013 – January 3, 2017
- Preceded by: redrawn district
- Succeeded by: Randy Jessup

Personal details
- Born: 1956 (age 69–70) Duluth, Minnesota
- Party: Minnesota Democratic–Farmer–Labor Party
- Spouse: Dave
- Children: 3
- Education: University of Minnesota (B.Ch.E.); University of Wisconsin–Madison (Ph.D.)
- Occupation: adjunct assistant professor

Barb Yarusso (born 1956) is a Minnesota politician and former member of the Minnesota House of Representatives. A member of the Minnesota Democratic–Farmer–Labor Party, she represented District 42A, which included portions of Ramsey County, Minnesota in the north-central Twin Cities metropolitan area.

== Early life, education, and career ==
Yarusso grew up primarily in Columbia Heights, Minnesota, and graduated from Columbia Heights High School. She earned a Bachelor of Chemical Engineering from the University of Minnesota and Ph.D. in the same field from University of Wisconsin–Madison. After college, she worked in the lab as an engineer for General Mills and as an industrial trainer and self-employed engineering consultant for HB Fuller, 3M, and Ecolab, as well as teaching at the University of St. Thomas in Saint Paul, Hill-Murray School, the University of Minnesota, and as a freelance tutor.

== Minnesota House of Representatives ==
Yarusso was first elected to the Minnesota House of Representatives in 2012 to an open seat created by post-census redistricting. She lost re-election to Republican Randy Jessup in 2016.

== Electoral history ==
Minnesota House of Representatives 42A district election, 2012
Party	Candidate	Votes	%	±%
Democratic (DFL)	Barb Yarusso	12,122	53.30	N/A
Republican	Russ Bertsch	10,591	46.56	N/A
