= Abby & Brittany =

- Genre: Reality
- Written by: Beth Glover
- Directed by: Beth Glover
- Starring: Abby and Brittany Hensel
- Country of origin: United States
- Original language: English
- No. of seasons: 1
- No. of episodes: 8

Production
- Executive producers: Bill Hayes; Kirk Streb
- Producers: Deanie Wilcher; Beth Glover
- Production location: St. Paul, Minnesota
- Editor: Carrie Goldman
- Running time: 21 minutes

Original release
- Network: TLC
- Release: August 28 – October 2, 2012

Related
- The Oprah Winfrey Show; Joined for Life; Joined for Life: Abby and Brittany Turn 16; Extraordinary People: The Twins Who Share a Body

Abby & Brittany is an American reality television series starring 22-year-old conjoined twins Abby and Brittany Hensel that aired on TLC from August 28 to October 2, 2012. The show features their graduation from Bethel University in Minnesota, subsequent job search, their travels in Europe and their preparations to move to a new house and begin teaching jobs. It was broadcast on BBC Three in the United Kingdom in April and May 2013, as three 60-minute episodes.

== Episodes ==
No.	Title	Original release date
1	"22nd Birthday Bash"	August 28, 2012
The girls celebrate their 22nd birthday with some friends.
2	"Spring Break, Here We Come"	August 28, 2012
The girls go to spring break in Texas for a relaxing vacation, but they must also start thinking about their first job interview.
3	"Road Trip!"	September 4, 2012
The women go to Chicago with friends before graduation, and they spend the weekend eating pizza, riding Segways and getting a bird's-eye view of the city from a skyscraper.
4	"Graduation"	September 4, 2012
The women are ready to graduate from college, but first have to complete a student-teaching assignment with a class of fourth-graders.
5	"London"	September 11, 2012
Abby, Brittany and two friends visit London, where they go sightseeing, enjoy a traditional high tea and try out their British accents.
6	"Italy"	September 18, 2012
Abby, Brittany and two friends visit Italy, where they tour Venice via gondola and take a trip to Rome to throw coins in the Trevi Fountain.
7	"Big Moves"	September 25, 2012
Abby & Brittany pack up and prepare to move to their new house while enjoying the last days of their summer. Also, their friend visits from England and the girls host a Memorial Day cookout.
8	"The Real World"	October 2, 2012
Abby & Brittany prepare for their first job in the real world. They also must make time to move into and decorate their new house.
