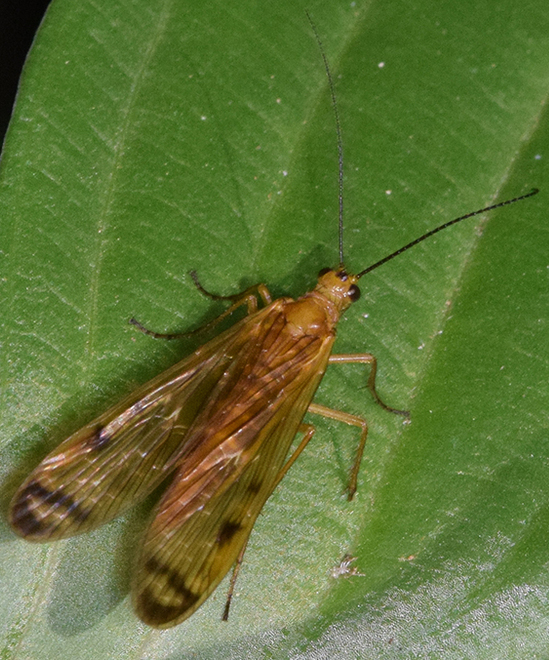
- Panorpodes komaensis

Scientific classification
- Domain: Eukaryota
- Kingdom: Animalia
- Phylum: Arthropoda
- Class: Insecta
- Order: Mecoptera
- Family: Panorpodidae
- Genus: Panorpodes; MacLachlan, 1875

= Panorpodes =

Panorpodes Temporal range: Priabonian–Present

Genus of insects

Panorpodes is a genus of scorpionflies in the family Panorpodidae, containing the following species:

- Panorpodes brachypodus Tan & Hua, 2008
- Panorpodes brevicaudatus (Hua, 1998)
- Panorpodes colei Byers, 2005
- Panorpodes komaensis Okamoto, 1925
- Panorpodes kuandianensis Zhong, Zhang & Hua, 2011
- Panorpodes maculata Miyamoto, 1984
- Panorpodes paradoxa MacLachlan, 1875
- Panorpodes pulchra Issiki, 1927
- †Panorpodes brevicauda Baltic amber, Priabonian
- †Panorpodes gedanensis, Baltic amber, Priabonian
- †Panorpodes hageni, Baltic amber, Priabonian
- †Panorpodes weitschati Baltic amber, Priabonian
