= Bob Merritt =

Retired senior pastor of Eagle Brook Church, Minnesota

Bob Merritt is the retired senior pastor of Eagle Brook Church in suburban Minneapolis-St. Paul, Minnesota, USA, a megachurch.

== Early life and education ==
Merritt's father was Calvin Merritt, pastor of the First Baptist Church in Neshannock Township, Pennsylvania. Bob Merritt attended Neshannock High School in the 1970s, then went to Bethel University in Arden Hills, Minnesota, where he obtained a master's degree in divinity. From 1983 to 1988, he was pastor of the Falun First Baptist Church in Falun, Wisconsin. He then went to Penn State University, where he earned a doctorate in speech communications in 1991.

== Ministry ==
Merritt became pastor of the First Baptist Church (Eagle Brook Church) of White Bear Lake in 1991. By 1997, when the church took its present name, average weekend attendance had grown to 1,400. To encourage people who may have been turned off by the formality of other churches, Merritt deliberately gave Eagle Brook an informal atmosphere with no stained glass, pews or altar. Merritt attributes the healthy level of donations from his core congregation to the sense of mission in the church, the drive to reach as many people as possible and help them grow in their faith. He also emphasizes the importance of providing more than just a place to hear music and listen to an inspiring or helpful message, but to also be active in the world community assisting the oppressed, poor and hungry.

Although retired from Eagle Brook Church, according to the former pastor's website, Bob Merritt remains engaged in his ministry. He now dedicates himself to advising and coaching other pastors and ministries. Additionally, Merritt continues to contribute to the broader faith community by speaking at churches and conferences and sharing his expertise and experiences to encourage and educate others in their spiritual and leadership journeys.

== Leadership training ==
Merritt was an instructor at Bethel Virtual Seminary of Bethel University.

== Recognition ==
In 2006, he was named Bethel Seminary Alumnus of the Year for his work in guiding the church through explosive growth and reaching out to people who had been lost to the church.

== Bibliography ==
- Bob Merritt (2011). When Life's Not Working: 7 Simple Choices for a Better Tomorrow. Baker Publishing Group. ISBN 978-0-8010-1378-2.
