= Eagle Brook Church =

Megachurch in Minnesota, US

- Location: Centerville, Minnesota
- Country: United States
- Denomination: Baptist Christianity
- Website: eaglebrookchurch.com

History
- Founded: 1948
- Founder(s): Sam and Ethel Hane

Architecture
- Style: Contemporary/Modern

Eagle Brook Church is a Baptist megachurch with multiple locations, based in Centerville, Minnesota. It is affiliated with Converge. Weekly church attendance was 27,463 people in 14 campuses in 2025. The senior pastor is Jason Strand.

== History ==
The church was founded in 1948 as a house Bible study group called the Bethany Baptist Mission (and then First Baptist Church), led by Sam and Ethel Hane in White Bear Lake, Minnesota. In 1991, Bob Merritt became the senior pastor of the 300-member church. In 1995, the church was renamed Eagle Brook Church.

The church relocated in 2005 to a new building in Lino Lakes, Minnesota, featuring a seating capacity of 2,100. One year later, in 2006, the original church building in White Bear Lake reopened due to rapid growth. Upon opening a third location in Spring Lake Park, the church began simulcasting weekend services from the Lino Lakes building to the other campuses.

In November 2018, CBS News listed Eagle Brook Church as the 19th-largest megachurch in the United States and the largest megachurch in Minnesota, with about 17,091 weekly visitors.

In 2020, Jason Strand became the senior pastor.

According to a 2025 church census, it claimed a weekly attendance of 27,463 people and 14 campuses. It has opened 14 campuses in different cities in the Minneapolis-Saint Paul area.

== Beliefs ==
The Church has a confession of faith and is a member of Converge.

== Eagle Brook Association ==
The church founded the Eagle Brook Association in 2006. Its mission is to help other churches proselytize—locally and worldwide. It provides other churches with free resources created by Eagle Brook Church for church partners to share with their own congregations. Since starting in 2006, church partners have, in total, reported to the Eagle Brook Association that over 118,000 people have become Christians.

=== Eagle Brook Finances ===
According to its financial reports, during 2022–2023, the church collected $58 million and gave $3.8 million to charitable works. In 2024, it paid $12 million for a 52 acres (21 ha) plot of residential land in Plymouth, Minnesota.

== Eagle Brook Music ==
Eagle Brook Music is a contemporary worship music collective from Eagle Brook Church in Lino Lakes. The collective writes and produces its own music as well as leads worship in weekend church services at the church. Eagle Brook Music also submits their songs to several major streaming services.

== See also ==
- List of the largest evangelical churches
- List of the largest evangelical church auditoriums
