= Minnesota Board of Nursing =

State agency regulating nursing in Minnesota

Agency overview
- Formed: April 12, 1907
- Jurisdiction: Minnesota
- Headquarters: 1210 Northland Drive, Suite 120, Mendota Heights, MN 55120
- Parent department: Minnesota Health-Related Licensing Boards
- Website: mn.gov/boards/nursing/

The Minnesota Board of Nursing (MBN) is a state agency that regulates the practice of nursing in Minnesota. It is responsible for licensing nurses, approving nursing education programs, and enforcing the state Nurse Practice Act. The Legislature created the agency in 1907 as the Minnesota State Board of Examiners of Nurses; it was renamed the Minnesota Board of Nursing in 1955.

== History ==
The Minnesota Legislature established statewide regulation of nursing in 1907, creating the Minnesota State Board of Examiners of Nurses. The board was renamed the Minnesota Board of Nursing in 1955. In 2011, the agency was reviewed by the Minnesota Office of the Legislative Auditor as part of the state's sunset review process, which assessed the continuing need for health-related licensing boards.

== Responsibilities ==
The board's statutory authority and duties are outlined in Minnesota Statutes Chapter 148, which covers nursing practice, licensure, discipline, and program approval. Its responsibilities include:

- Licensing and regulating licensed practical nurses, registered nurses, and advanced practice registered nurses
- Approving nursing education programs
- Investigating complaints and taking disciplinary action when warranted

The board's mission is to protect public health and safety through regulation of nursing education, licensure, and practice.

In April 2023, an investigative report by ProPublica (co-published with Minnesota Public Radio and KARE-TV) detailed that the Board's disciplinary investigations had become increasingly delayed, with some cases remaining unresolved for over a year, highlighting concerns about timely enforcement of public safety measures.

== Data and workforce role ==
The Board also serves as a source of workforce statistics. For example, in 2023, the Minnesota Nurses Association reported Board-provided data showing that more than 130,000 registered nurses were licensed in the state, an increase of 8,000 from the previous year.

== Governance ==
The board consists of sixteen members appointed by the governor, including twelve licensed or registered practical nurses and four members of the public. It is headquartered in Mendota Heights, Minnesota.

The Minnesota Board of Nursing is a member of the National Council of State Boards of Nursing.

== See also ==
- National Council of State Boards of Nursing
- Nurse licensure
