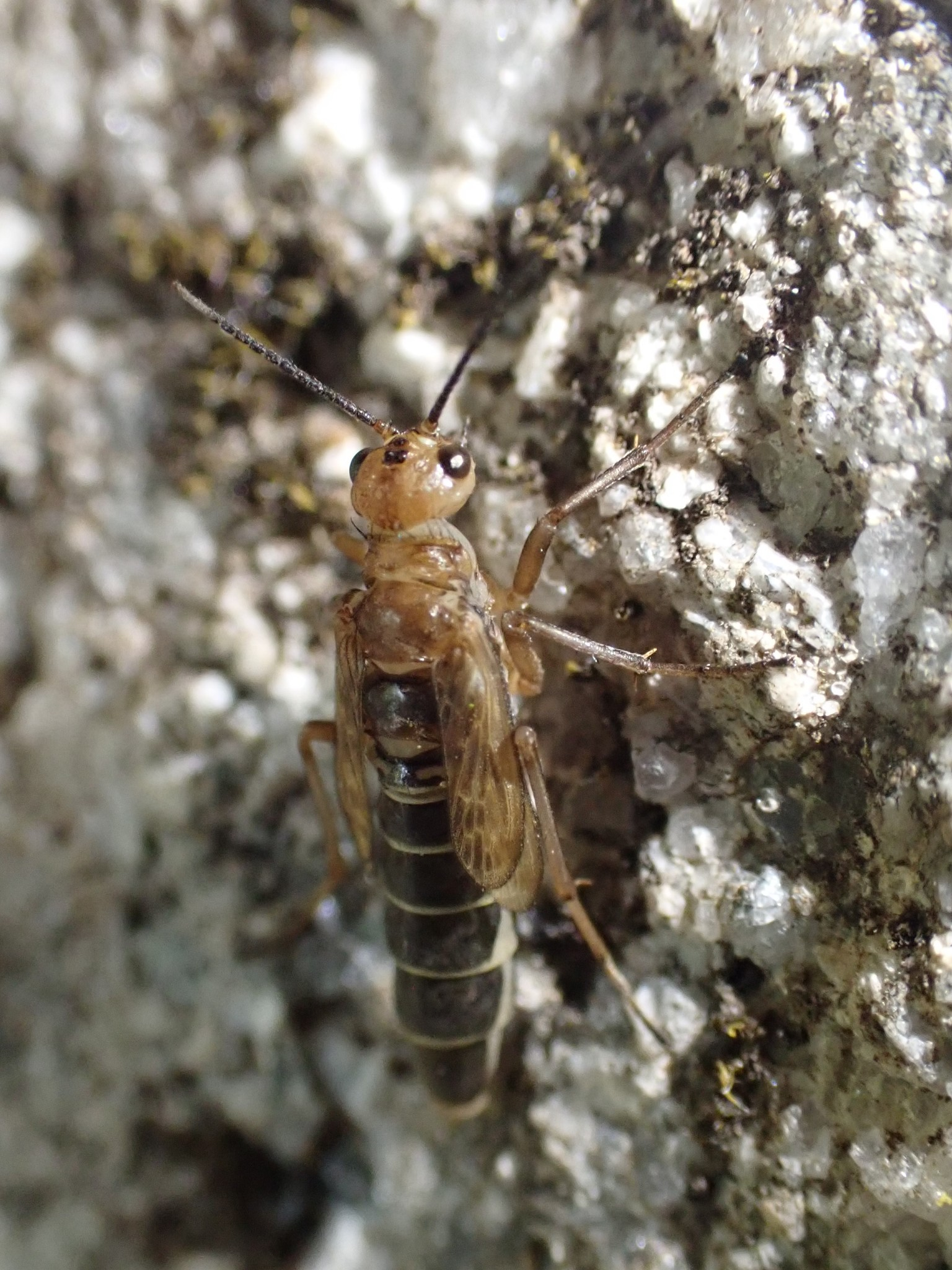
- Brachypanorpa montana
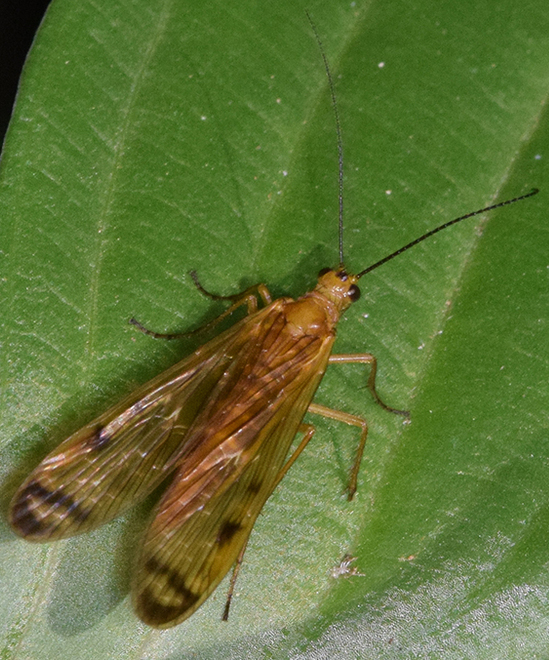
- Panorpodes komaensis

Scientific classification
- Kingdom: Animalia
- Phylum: Arthropoda
- Class: Insecta
- Order: Mecoptera
- Superfamily: Panorpoidea
- Family: Panorpodidae; Handlirsch 1920

Genera
- Brachypanorpa; Panorpodes

= Panorpodidae =

Panorpodidae Temporal range: Eocene–Recent

Family of insects

The Panorpodidae are a small family of scorpionflies. Of the two genera, Brachypanorpa occurs only in the United States, and Panorpodes occurs in East Asia, with a single species in California. Unlike their sister group Panorpidae, the family generally has short jaws, amongst the shortest of all mecopterans. Brachypanorpa is thought to be phytophagous, consuming the epidermis of soft leaves, and a similar diet is suggested for Panorpodes.

== Genera ==
The family contains extant 13 species in two genera:

- Brachypanorpa Carpenter, 1931 (five species: United States)
- Panorpodes MacLachlan, 1875 (eight species: Japan, Korea, California) Fossil species known from Eocene aged Baltic amber

In addition, the following fossil genus is also known:

- †Austropanorpodes Petrulevicius 2009 Laguna del Hunco Formation, Argentina, Eocene (Ypresian)

=== Characteristics ===
Panorpode larvae differ significantly from those of other scorpionflies in that they have smooth, glabrous mandibles without molar grinding surfaces or filtering spines, indicating that they do not feed on solid carrion like adjacent families (Panorpidae and Bittacidae). Instead, their shape indicates an adaptability to absorb degraded organic material or plant juices from soil or leaf litter.
