= United and uniting churches =

Union of Protestant churches of different creeds

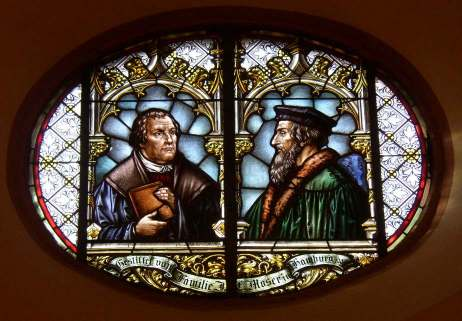
Glass window in the town church of Wiesloch (Stadtkirche Wiesloch) with Martin Luther and John Calvin commemorating the 1821 union of Lutheran and Reformed churches in the Grand Duchy of Baden

A united church, also called a uniting church, is a denomination formed from the merger or other form of church union of two or more different Protestant Christian denominations, a number of which come from separate and distinct denominational orientations or traditions. Multi-denominationalism, or a multi-denominational church or organization, is a congregation or organization that is affiliated with two or more Christian denominations, whether they be part of the same tradition or from separate and distinct traditions.

Historically, unions of Protestant churches were enforced by the state, usually in order to have a stricter control over the religious sphere of its people, but also for other organizational reasons. As modern Christian ecumenism progresses, unions between various Protestant traditions are becoming more and more common, resulting in a growing number of united and uniting churches. Examples include the United Church of Canada (1925), the Church of South India (1947), the Evangelical Church in Germany (1948), the United Church of Christ (1957), the United Methodist Church (1968), the Church of North India (1970), the Church of Pakistan (1970), the Uniting Church in Australia (1977), the Protestant Church in the Netherlands (2004), and the United Protestant Church of France (2013).

In the developing world, this model has been attractive in countries where Protestants are a small minority of the population; by pooling resources and endorsing cross-attendance between denominations, churches can serve a wider geographical area. In the developed world, since the mid-20th century, and the rise of secularism worldwide, mainline Protestantism has shrunk, reducing the viability of many individual denominations maintaining parallel administrative structures. Among others, Reformed (Calvinist), Anglican, and Lutheran churches have merged, often creating large nationwide denominations. In some countries, Methodist and Congregational denominations have also merged. The phenomenon is much less common among evangelical, nondenominational and charismatic churches as new ones arise and many of them remain independent of each other, although in some cases instances of evangelical church congregations joining multiple denominations in a phenomenon known as "multi-denominationalism" does occur; but in most cases Evangelicals cooperate with each other through interdenominationalism while still maintaining denominational distinctions.

Perhaps the oldest official united church is found in Germany, where the Protestant Church in Germany is a federation of Lutheran, United (Prussian Union) and Reformed churches, a union dating back to 1817. The first of the series of unions was at a synod in Idstein to form the Protestant Church in Hesse and Nassau in August 1817, commemorated in naming the church of Idstein Unionskirche one hundred years later.

Around the world, each united or uniting church comprises a different mix of predecessor Protestant denominations. Trends are visible, however, as most united and uniting churches have one or more predecessors with heritage in the Reformed tradition and many are members of the World Alliance of Reformed Churches. In 2020, according to the World Christian Database, the online version of the World Christian Encyclopedia, published by Edinburgh University Press, the "Consult on Uniting and United Churches" reported 81,976,000 members of United and Uniting Churches globally. Ethiopia has an estimated 9 million members of United churches.

== Conciliar movement ==
In the 1950s and 1960s, an ecumenical spirit emerged in many churches in the United States, leading to a conciliar movement known in some circles as Conciliarity. A product of this movement was the Consultation on Church Union (COCU). The COCU disbanded formally in 2002 but moved into the Churches Uniting in Christ movement.

== Denominations by country ==
Country	Denomination	Founding Year	United branches	Doctrine	Sources
Australia	Uniting Church in Australia	1977	Congregational Union of Australia, Methodist Church of Australasia, and Presbyterian Church of Australia churches	Reformed (Congregationalist and Presbyterian) and Methodist churches	
Austria	Protestant Church in Austria (Note: Not an actual united church, but a union of churches, even if the differences are quite faint in the field.)	1861	Protestant Church of the Augsburg Confession in Austria and Reformed Church in Austria	Lutheran and Reformed churches	
Austria	Free Churches of Austria	2013	Baptists in Austria, Federation of Evangelical Churches in Austria, Free Christian Community - Pentecostal Community, Elaia Congregations and Mennonite Free Church of Austria	Baptist, Evangelical, Pentecostal and Mennonite churches	
Bangladesh	Church of Bangladesh	1974		Anglican and Presbyterian churches	
Belgium	United Protestant Church in Belgium	1979		Reformed, Methodist and Lutheran churches	
Canada	United Church of Canada	1925	Congregationalist, Methodist Church (Canada), and a majority of the Presbyterian Church in Canada (including Bermuda)	Congregationalist, Methodist and Reformed (Presbyterian) churches	
China	The Protestant Church in China (Note: Represented by the China Christian Council and the Three-Self Patriotic Movement, the Lianghui lit. 'two organisations'.)	1954			
Czech Republic	Evangelical Church of Czech Brethren	1918		Lutheran and Reformed (Calvinist) confessions; However, the ECCB has deeper roots in the Czech Reformation: in the Utraquist Hussite Church (1431–1620) and in the Unity of Brethren aka Moravian Church (1457–1620).	
Democratic Republic of Congo	Church of Christ in the Congo	1924	100 denominations	Anglican, Baptist, Mennonite, Methodist, Pentecostal, Presbyterian, Salvation Army and Seventh-day Adventist denominations	
France	United Protestant Church of France	2013	Reformed Church of France and the Evangelical Lutheran Church of France	Lutheran and Reformed (Huguenot) churches	
France	Union of Protestant Churches of Alsace and Lorraine	2006	The Protestant Church of the Augsburg Confession of Alsace and Lorraine and the Protestant Reformed Church of Alsace and Lorraine	Lutheran and Reformed churches	
Germany	Protestant Church in Germany	1922	Lutheran and Protestant church bodies (sees are also organised in the United Evangelical Lutheran Church of Germany Union of Evangelical Churches), of these ten are united:	Lutheran and Reformed	
Germany	Evangelical Church in Berlin, Brandenburg and Silesian Upper Lusatia; Evangelical Church in the Rhineland; Evangelical Church of Westphalia	1817	successors of the Prussian Union of Churches	Lutheran and Reformed	
Germany	Evangelical Church of Anhalt	1880		Lutheran and Reformed	
Germany	Protestant Church in Baden	1821		Lutheran and Reformed	
Germany	Evangelical Church of Bremen	1873		Lutheran and Reformed	
Germany	Evangelical Church in Central Germany	2009	Evangelical Church of the Church Province of Saxony (branch of the Prussian Union) and Evangelical Lutheran Church in Thuringia	Lutheran and Reformed	
Germany	Protestant Church in Hesse and Nassau	1933	Evangelical Church of Hesse (uniate since 1822), Evangelical Church of Nassau (uniate since 1817) and Evangelical Church of Frankfurt (unitate since 1899)	Lutheran and Reformed	
Germany	Evangelical Church of Hesse Electorate-Waldeck	1934	Evangelical Church of Hesse-Kassel (uniate since 1818) and Evangelical State Church of Waldeck and Pyrmont (Waldeck part; uniate since 1821)	Lutheran and Reformed	
Germany	Evangelical Church of the Palatinate (Protestant State Church)	1818		Lutheran and Reformed	
India	Church of North India	1970		Anglican, Methodist, Baptist, Disciples of Christ, Presbyterian, Congregational, and the Church of the Brethren churches	
India	Church of South India	1947		Anglican, Methodist, Congregational, Presbyterian, and Reformed churches	
Indonesia	Indonesia Christian Church or Gereja Kristen Indonesia	1988	GKI East Java, GKI West Java and GKI Central Java		
Italy	Union of Methodist and Waldensian Churches	1975	Waldensian Evangelical Church and the Methodist Evangelical Church in Italy	Waldensian and Methodist churches	
Jamaica	United Church in Jamaica and the Cayman Islands	1965		Presbyterian, Congregationalist, and Disciples of Christ churches	
Japan	United Church of Christ in Japan	1941	union of thirty-three Protestant denominations	all Protestant denominations in Japan, including Anglican, Baptist, Holiness, Lutheran, Pentecostal, and Salvation Army churches.	
Kiribati	Kiribati Uniting Church	2014		several Protestant denominations in Kiribati, including Congregationalists, Evangelicals, Anglicans, and Presbyterians.	
Melanesia	United Church in Papua New Guinea and Solomon Islands			Methodist and the Reformed tradition	
Netherlands	Protestant Church in the Netherlands	2004	Dutch Reformed Church, the Reformed Churches in the Netherlands (GKN), and the Evangelical Lutheran Church in the Kingdom of the Netherlands	Continental Reformed and Lutheran churches; the Reformed GKN was itself a union of Doleantie and Seceder churches.	
Pakistan	Church of Pakistan	1970		Anglicans, Scottish Presbyterians (Church of Scotland), Methodists, and Lutherans	
Puerto Rico	United Evangelical Church in Puerto Rico	1931, 2006	Congregational Church, the Evangelical United Brethren Church and the Christian Church	indigenous Brethren, Christian, and Congregationalist denominations	
Philippines	Iglesia Evangelica Unida de Cristo	1932		indigenous Presbyterian and Methodist denominations	
Philippines	United Church of Christ in the Philippines		Evangelical Church of the Philippines, the Philippine Methodist Church, the Disciples of Christ, the United Evangelical Church and several independent congregations.		
Philippines	Union Church of Manila	1914		Presbyterian and Methodist churches	
South Africa	Uniting Reformed Church in Southern Africa	1994	Dutch Reformed Church in Africa and Dutch Reformed Mission Church	Historically Black and Coloured Continental Reformed churches	
Sweden	Evangelical Free Church in Sweden	2002	Örebro Mission, the Free Baptist Union and the Holiness Union		
Sweden	Uniting Church in Sweden	2011	Baptist Union of Sweden, the Swedish branch of the United Methodist Church, and the Mission Covenant Church of Sweden		
Thailand	Church of Christ in Thailand	1934		Baptist, Churches of Christ and Presbyterian congregations	
United Kingdom	United Reformed Church	1972	Congregational Union of England and Wales and the Presbyterian Church of England, later joined by the Churches of Christ (Europe) and the Congregational Union of Scotland	Reformed (Congregationalist and Presbyterian) and Churches of Christ denominations.	
United Kingdom	United Free Church of Scotland	1900	United Presbyterian Church of Scotland (or UP; itself a merger of the Relief Church and United Secession Church) and the majority of the 19th-century Free Church of Scotland	Reformed (Presbyterian) churches	
United States	United Church of Christ	1957	two previously united churches: Congregational Christian Churches and the Evangelical and Reformed Church; and the Convention of the South; the United Evangelical Church in Puerto Rico became independent again in 2006	Continental Reformed, German United (Reformed and Lutheran), Congregationalist and Black churches	
United States	United Methodist Church	1968	Methodist Church and the Evangelical United Brethren Church		
United States	Wesleyan Church	1968	Wesleyan Methodist Church and the Pilgrim Holiness Church	Methodist and Holiness churches	
United States	Unitarian Universalist Association	1961	American Unitarian Association and the Universalist Church of America; the Canadian Unitarian Council became independent again in 2002	Historically Unitarian and Universalist denominations	
Zambia	United Church in Zambia	1965	Church of Central Africa, Rhodesia (Presbyterian); the Union Church of Copperbelt; the Copperbelt Free Church Council; the Church of Barotseland and the Methodist church		

== See also ==
- Christianity
- Congregationalist polity
- Continuing church
- Convergence Movement
- English Covenant
- List of Christian denominations
- Uniate Church
