= Christian Council of Sweden =

Swedish Christian organization

- Sveriges kristna råd
- Formation: 15 December 1992
- Type: Christian ecumenical organization
- Headquarters: Gustavslundsvägen 8, Stockholm, Sweden
- Official language: Swedish

The Christian Council of Sweden (Swedish: Sveriges kristna råd) is an ecumenical Christian organization in Sweden, established on 15 December 1992.

== Member denominations ==
Following denominations were members in 2013:

=== Free church movement ===
- Evangelical Free Church
- Uniting Church in Sweden
- Salvation Army
- Swedish Pentecostal Movement
- Swedish Alliance Mission
- Vineyard Norden

=== Lutheran ===
- Estonian Evangelical Lutheran Church
- Latvian Evangelical Lutheran Church
- Church of Sweden including the Swedish Evangelical Mission
- Hungarian Protestant Church

=== Eastern Orthodox ===
- Bulgarian Orthodox Church
- Finnish Orthodox Church
- Macedonian Orthodox Church
- Romanian Orthodox Church
- Russian Orthodox Church (Parish of the Transfiguration of Jesus)
- Russian Orthodox Church (Moscow Patriarcate)
- Serbian Orthodox Church
- Saint Selasse Ethipic Orthodox Church

=== Oriental Orthodox ===
- Armenian Apostolic Church
- Ethiopian Orthodox Church
- Coptic Orthodox Church
- Syriac Orthodox Archdiocese of Sweden and the Rest of Scandinavia

=== Church of the East ===
- Assyrian Church of the East
- Old Church of the East

=== Roman Catholic ===
- Roman Catholic Diocese of Stockholm

=== Observing members ===
- Seventh-day Adventist Church

== Earlier members ==
- Estonian Orthodox Church
- Free Baptist Union, became part of the Sanctification Union/Free Baptist Union and later the Evangelical Free Church in Sweden
- Sanctification Union, became part of the Sanctification Union/Free Baptist Union and later the Evangelical Free Church in Sweden
- United Methodist Church of Sweden, became part of the Uniting Church in Sweden
- Swedish Baptism Union, became part of the Uniting Church in Sweden
- Mission Covenant Church of Sweden, became part of the Uniting Church in Sweden
- Örebro Mission, became part of the Evangelical Free Church in Sweden
