= Swedish Free Church Council =

Protestant organization in Sweden

- Sveriges frikyrkosamråd
- Formation: 1992
- Type: Christian ecumenical organization
- Headquarters: Bromma, Sweden
- Official language: Swedish

The Swedish Free Church Council (Swedish: Sveriges frikyrkosamråd) is an association of free churches in Sweden. It is part of the Christian Council of Sweden (Swedish: Sveriges kristna råd) . The Swedish Free Church Council was established in 1992.

In total the member churches have about 250,000 members, with almost double that figure involved in the churches' activities. The largest member church is the Uniting Church in Sweden, with approximately 85,000 members.

The free churches belong to various Protestant denominations: Baptists, Methodists, Reformed, Pentecostal etc. Most of the free church denominations in Sweden began during the nineteenth century when an evangelical revival broke out. The Swedish free church family has many branches, often quite different, but united in the common bond of the necessity of a personal faith.

== Members ==
- Uniting Church in Sweden (Equmeniakyrkan, established on 4 June 2011 out of the Baptist Union of Sweden (Svenska Baptistsamfundet), the United Methodist Church of Sweden (Metodistkyrkan), and the Mission Covenant Church of Sweden (Svenska Missionskyrkan, incorporating the Swedish Salvation Army, which is a separate organisation from the international Salvation Army, which also operates in Sweden))
- Salvation Army in Sweden (Frälsningsarmén)
- Swedish Alliance Mission (Svenska Alliansmissionen)
- Vineyard Norden, see Association of Vineyard Churches
- Evangelical Free Church in Sweden (Evangeliska Frikyrkan)
- Swedish Pentecostal Movement (Pingströrelsen i Sverige)
- Seventh-day Adventist Church in Sweden (Adventistsamfundet i Sverige), observing members
