= Habo Mission Covenant Church =

Coordinates: 57.9129°N 14.0872°E

- Habo missionskyrka
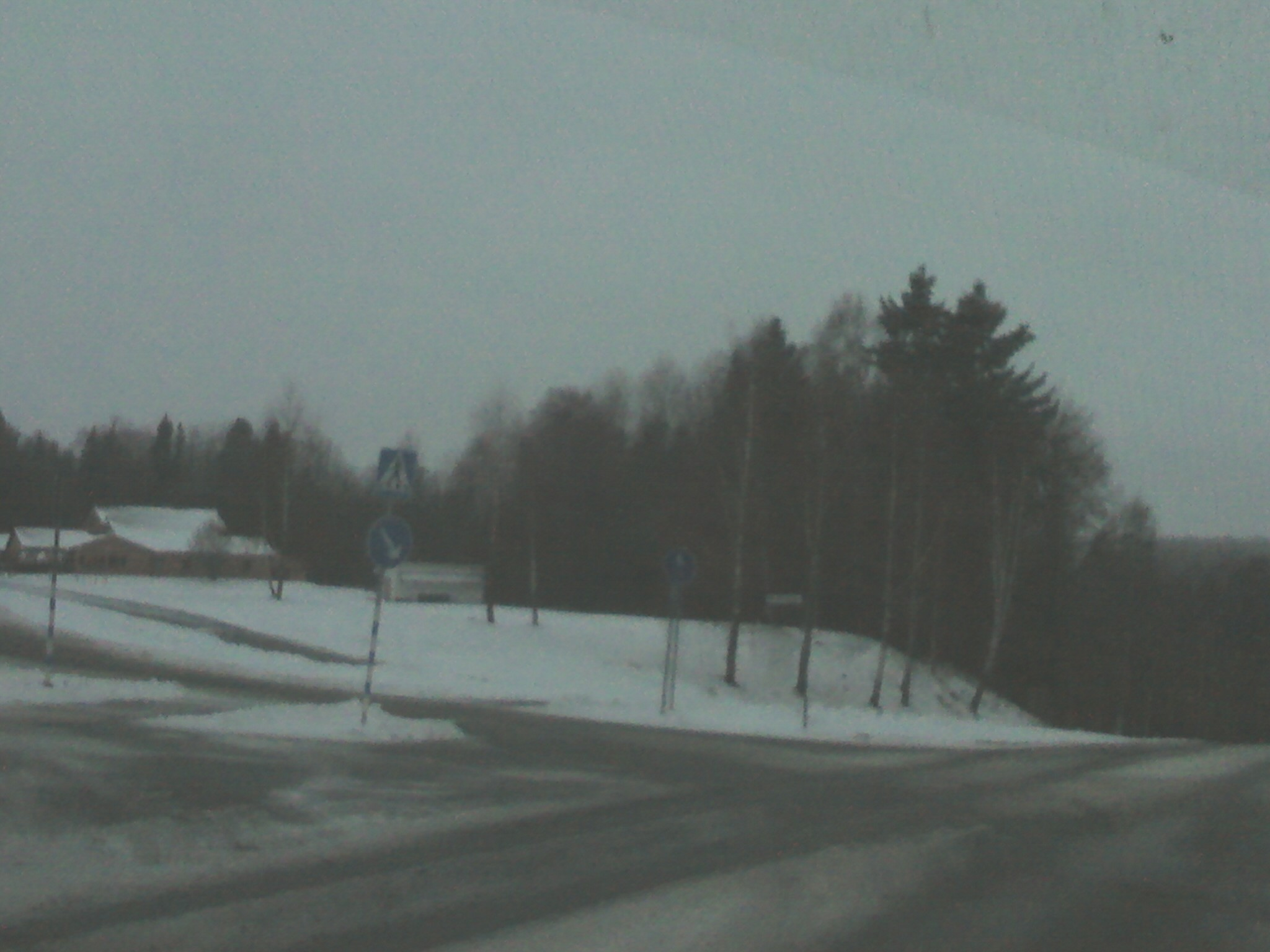
- Habo Mission Covenant Church in December 2013
- Habo Mission Covenant Church
- Location: Habo
- Country: Sweden
- Denomination: Uniting Church in Sweden/Swedish Alliance Mission
- Previous denomination: Mission Covenant Church of Sweden

History
- Consecrated: March 1983

Administration
- Parish: Habo

The Habo Mission Covenant Church (Swedish: Habo missionskyrka) is a church building in Habo, Sweden. Belonging to both the Uniting Church in Sweden and the Swedish Alliance Mission. the current church building was opened in March 1983.
