= Kyrkan vid Vasaparken, Norrköping =

Coordinates: 58.5841°N 16.1923°E

Kyrkan vid Vasaparken
- Kyrkan vid Vasaparken
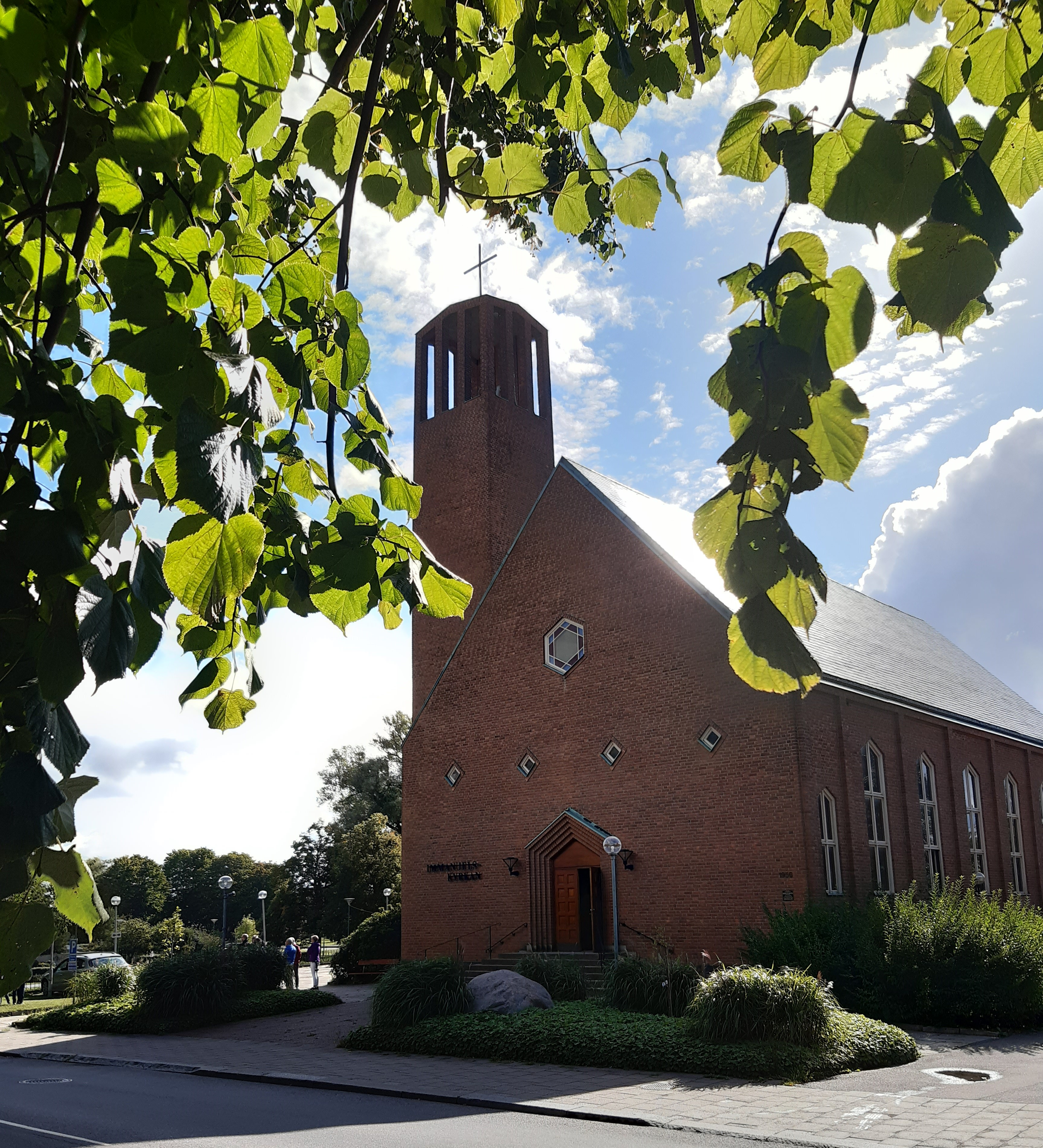
- Kyrkan vid Vasaparken (Sept. 2020)
- Kyrkan vid Vasaparken
- Location: Norrköping
- Country: Sweden
- Denomination: Vineyard Nordic, Evangelical Free Church in Sweden
- Previous denomination: Uniting Church in Sweden, Mission Covenant Church of Sweden
- Website: Norrköping Vineyard, Korskyrkan

History
- Former name: Immanuel Church
- Consecrated: 1956

Architecture
- Architect: Sten Carlquist
- Construction cost: 1,5 mil. SEK

Administration
- Parish: Norrköping Vineyard, Korskyrkan

The Kyrkan vid Vasaparken (English: Church at Vasa park), former Immanuel Church (Swedish: Immanuelskyrkan), is a church building in central Norrköping, Sweden. It was built by the Immanuel Church Congregation in 1956. Since 2020 it is owned by the two congregations Norrköping Vineyard (affiliated to the Vineyard Nordic) and Baptistförsamlingen Saron-Korskyrkan (commonly Korskyrkan, affiliated to the Evangelical Free Church in Sweden).

The building got a new sign with the new name Kyrkan vid Vasaparken 2025-04-05.

The Immanuel Church Congregation (Swedish: Immanuelskyrkans församling), originally part of the Mission Covenant Church of Sweden and later Uniting Church in Sweden, remained in the building until February 2023, when it ceased to exist. The congregation previously held a church building on Gamla Rådstugugatan, inaugurated on 28 December 1884.
