= Religion in Sweden =

Religious affiliation in Sweden (2021)
1. Church of Sweden (Lutheran) (53.2%)
2. Other Protestants (3.50%)
3. Eastern Orthodox Church (1.50%)
4. Catholic Church (1.20%)
5. Other Christian (0.20%)
6. No religion (37.9%)
7. Islam (2.10%)
8. Other religions (0.40%)

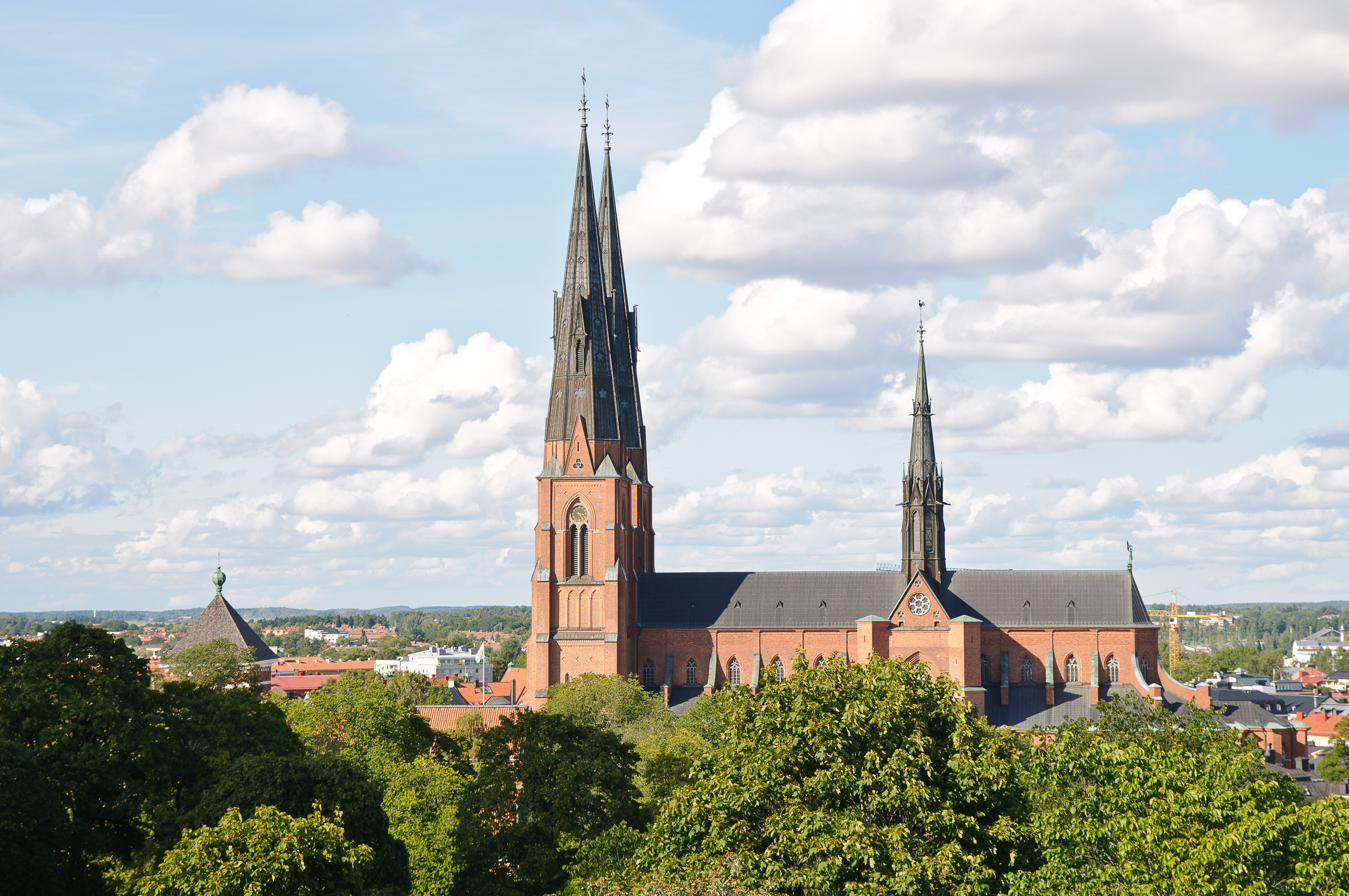
Side view of Uppsala Cathedral, the headquarters of the Church of Sweden.

People attending the offering of the Mass at Vadstena Abbey Church (Evangelical-Lutheran) in Sweden

Religion in Sweden has, over the years, become increasingly diverse. Christianity has been the religion of virtually all of the Swedish population from the 12th to the early 20th century, with Evangelical-Lutheranism being the dominant Christian denomination to the present day. Religious practice has experienced some decline in the late 20th and early 21st century.

Christianity came to Sweden as early as the 9th century mainly as a result of an expansion in trade. The ancient Nordic religions were slowly replaced. By the 12th century, Christianity became the established national religion and the Archdiocese of Uppsala was established as the first national church. Swedish Christians belonged to the Catholic Church until 1527 when the Swedish state church was established as a Protestant church based on Lutheran principles, following the Protestant Reformation enacted by Martin Luther which converted most of Germanic Europe. The Lutheran Church of Sweden was formed and remained the official religion of the Christian state until the turn of the 21st century. The Swedish Act of Succession requires monarchs to "profess the pure evangelical faith".

In recent years, the Swedish religious landscape has become increasingly diverse, with Christians comprising in 2021 some 59.6% (of which 53.2% belonging to the Church of Sweden which dropped to 50.7% in 2025) of the total population and rising numbers of people of other religions (2.5%) and unaffiliated people (37.9%). The Lutheran Church of Sweden – which was the state religion until 2000 – is by far the largest Christian denomination but is facing a continuous decline in registered membership. Other minor Christian denominations include Free churches, the Catholic Church, and the Eastern Orthodox Church. Muslims make up the largest non-Christian religious group, followed by Buddhists, Jews and Hindus. Jews are one of Sweden's five official national minorities with Yiddish one of the officially recognised minority languages. The country has ratified the Framework Convention for the Protection of National Minorities and the European Charter for Regional or Minority Languages.

== History ==
=== Historical Norse religion ===
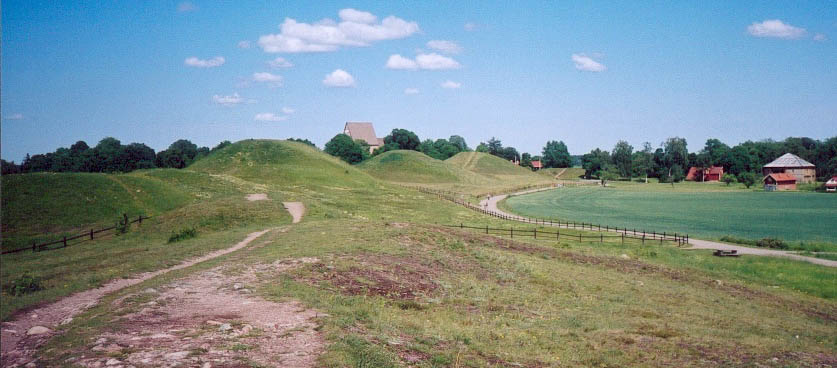
Gamla Uppsala, the centre of worship in Sweden until the temple was destroyed in the late 11th century.

Before the 11th century, Swedes practised Norse religion, worshipping a variety of Germanic deities. An important religious centre was the Temple at Uppsala. The shape and location of this temple is sparsely documented, but it is referenced in the Norse sagas and Saxo Grammaticus' Gesta Danorum, and is also described by Adam of Bremen. It was probably destroyed by King Ingold I in 1087.

While Norse religion was officially abandoned with the Christianization of Scandinavia, belief in many spirits of Norse mythology such as tomtar, trolls, elves and dwarves lived on for a long time in Scandinavian folklore.

=== 9th–12th century: Conversion to Catholicism ===
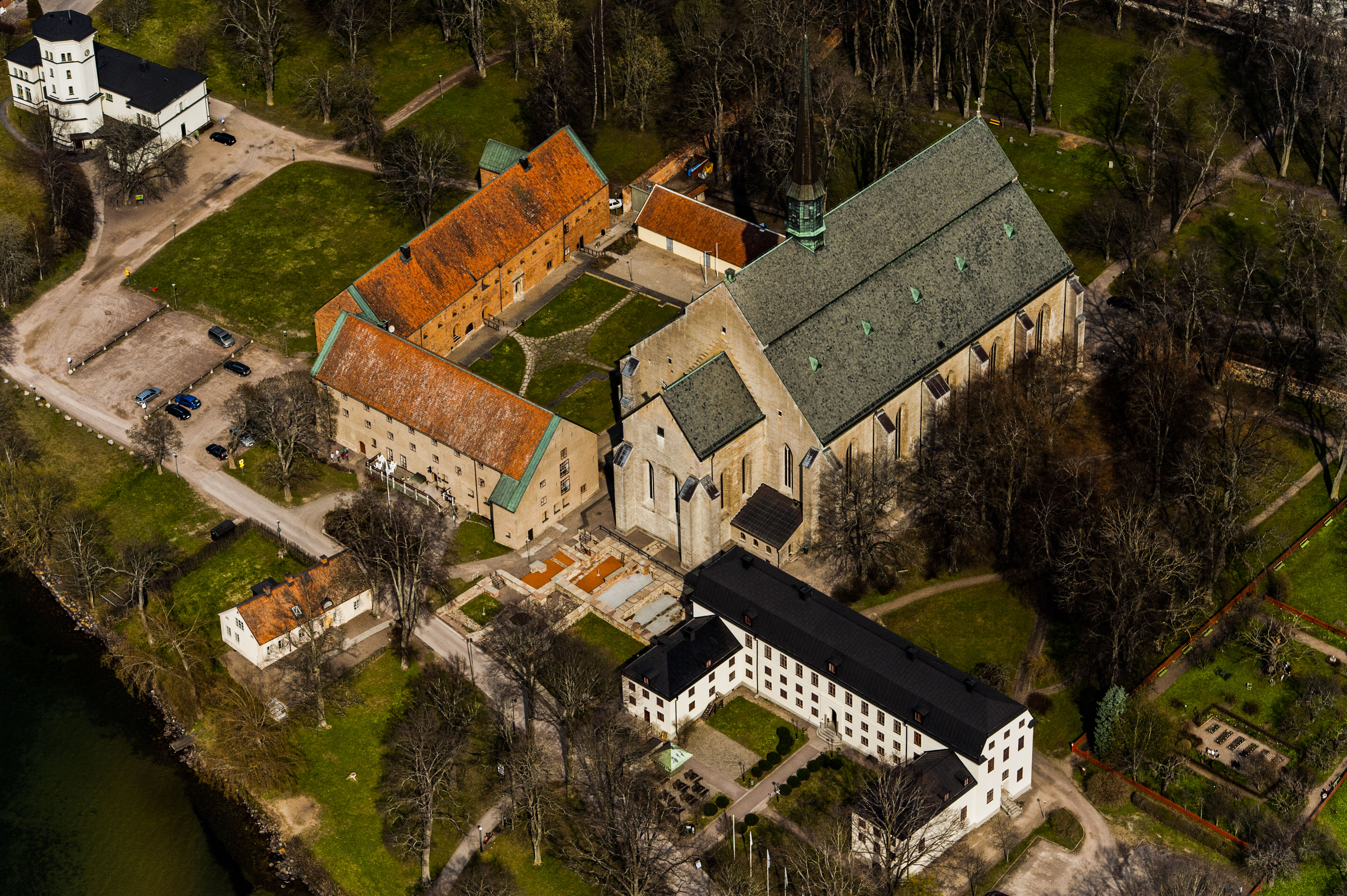
The historical Vadstena Abbey of the Catholic order of the Bridgettines, founded by Bridget of Sweden.

The oldest evidence of Christian burial sites in Sweden are dated to the 6th century, but they are very few in number. The earliest documented campaign to Christianise the Swedes was made by the monk Ansgar (801–865). Making his first visit to Birka in 828–829, he was granted permission to build a church. In 831, he returned home and became Archbishop of Hamburg-Bremen, with responsibility for Christianity in the north. Around 850, he came back to Birka, where the original congregation had been shattered. Ansgar tried to reestablish it, but it only lasted a few years.

Christianity first gained a hold in Västergötland, probably due to mercantile ties to the Christian Anglo-Saxon kingdoms in England. Remnants of a 9th-century church building has recently been excavated in Varnhem. The diocese of Skara, which is the oldest diocese in Sweden, emerged under the Archdiocese of Hamburg-Bremen, in the late 10th century. According to Adam of Bremen, the Christian king Olof Skötkonung, who ruled from c. 995 to c. 1022 was forced to limit Christian activities to the western province. When King Stenkil ascended to the throne in 1060 Christianity was firmly established throughout most of Sweden, although the people of Uppland, and probably Sodermanland, resisted the new religion.

The last king adhering to the old religion was Blot-Sweyn, who reigned 1084–1087. A handful of local saints (canonized on diocesan level before the centralized process became normative in 1170–1200), folk saints and clerics were allegedly martyred as late as the 1120s, most of them in Sodermanland and Uppland. Under the reign of Eric the Saint (1150–1160), Christianity became an ideological factor of the state and the First Swedish Crusade took place. The crusade was a military expedition aimed at converting the Finns to Christianity and conquering Finland as Swedish territory. A national church of Sweden was not established until 1164, when the first Archbishop of Uppsala received his pallium from the Archbishop of Lund.

Pre-Reformation Swedish Catholic religious leaders – including Bridget of Sweden, founder of the continuously functioning Catholic Vadstena Abbey – continue to be held in regard by the population as a whole. Her nunnery at Vadstena is one of Sweden's tourist attraction.

=== 16th century: Protestant Reformation; conversion to Lutheranism ===
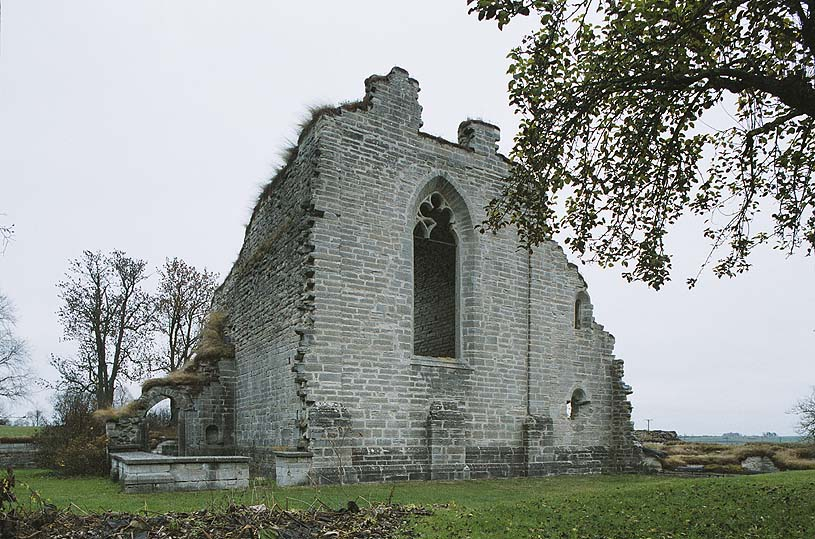
Ruins of Alvastra Abbey in Ödeshög. Various ruined medieval Catholic monasteries such as this one stand as testimonies of the appropriation of Catholic properties by the Swedish state during the Protestant Reformation.

Shortly after Gustav Vasa was elected king in 1523, he asked the Pope to confirm Johannes Magnus as Archbishop of Sweden, replacing Gustav Trolle, who had supported the Danish king Christian II and was convicted for treason. When the Pope refused, Gustav Vasa – he himself a proponent of a "Renaissance Biblical Humanism" – started to promote the Swedish Lutheran reformers Olaus, Laurentius Petri, and Laurentius Andreae. Gustav Trolle was eventually forced into exile, and soon all ecclesiastical property was transferred to the Crown. In 1531, Laurentius Petri was appointed by the Crown to become the first Lutheran primate of Sweden, and was ordained by five Catholic bishops without papal assent. The ties with Rome were irreversibly cut in 1536, when Canon Law was abolished.

Originally, no changes were made to official church doctrine, and the episcopal organization was retained. Gradually, in spite of popular protests against the introduction of "Luthery", teachings were aligned with continental Lutheranism. Calvinism was, otherwise, refuted as heresy at the synod of Stockholm in 1565. In order to appease the Holy See, king John III of Sweden, one of Gustav Vasa's sons, took measures to bring the Church of Sweden to a theological position influenced by George Cassander, but, in the heat of controversy, such a compromise position did not achieve its intent of reunion. However, after his death, his brother, Duke Charles, summoned the Uppsala Synod in 1593, which declared the Holy Scriptures the sole guideline for faith, with four documents accepted as faithful and authoritative explanations of it: the Apostles' Creed, the Nicene Creed, the Athanasian Creed, and the unaltered Augsburg Confession of 1530. The Uppsala Synod also reinstated The Swedish Church Ordinance of 1572, which remained in use until 1686.

The move put Charles at odds with the heir to the throne, his nephew Sigismund, who was raised in the Catholic faith. Although Sigismund promised to uphold Lutheranism, Duke Charles's aspirations to power led to the War against Sigismund, a power struggle that was effectively decided at the Battle of Stångebro in 1598, in favour of Charles and Protestantism.

During the era following the Protestant Reformation, usually known as the period of Lutheran Orthodoxy, small groups of non-Lutherans, especially Calvinist Dutchmen, the Moravian Church and Walloon immigrants from the Southern Netherlands, played a significant role in trade and industry, and were quietly tolerated as long as they kept a low profile.

=== 17th–18th century: Conversion of the Sami, freedom for Christian minorities and Jews ===
The Sami, who originally had their own shamanistic religion, were converted to Lutheranism by Swedish missionaries in the 17th and 18th centuries. Citizens of foreign nations, mainly Russians, were granted freedom to practice Eastern Orthodox Christianity since the Treaty of Stolbovo in 1617. Anglican and Calvinist foreigners were granted freedom to practice their religions in Stockholm (1741) and Gothenburg (1747). Similar liberties were granted to Catholics in 1781, and an apostolic vicar was sent to Sweden in 1783. In 1782, with the passage of Judereglementet, Jews were allowed to settle in three cities and practice their religion, although they were not allowed to proselytize or marry Christians.

=== 18th–19th century: Crackdown on Pietism and enforcement of Lutheranism ===
In order to curb Pietism, several royal decrees and parliament acts were issued in the 18th century, such as the Conventicle Act and Kyrkogångsplikt lit. 'church attendance duty'. They forbade Swedish citizens to engage in practices other than mandatory Lutheran Sunday Mass and daily family devotions. Without the presence of a Lutheran clergyman, public religious gatherings were forbidden. It remained illegal until 1860 for Lutheran Swedes to convert to another confession or religion.

=== 19th–20th century: Liberalisation of all religions ===
In 1860 it became legal to leave the Church of Sweden for the purpose of becoming a member of another officially recognised religious denomination. From 1951, it became legal to leave the church, without providing any reason. From 1951 to 1977 all religious institutions could only be established with the permission of the Crown.

== Demographics ==
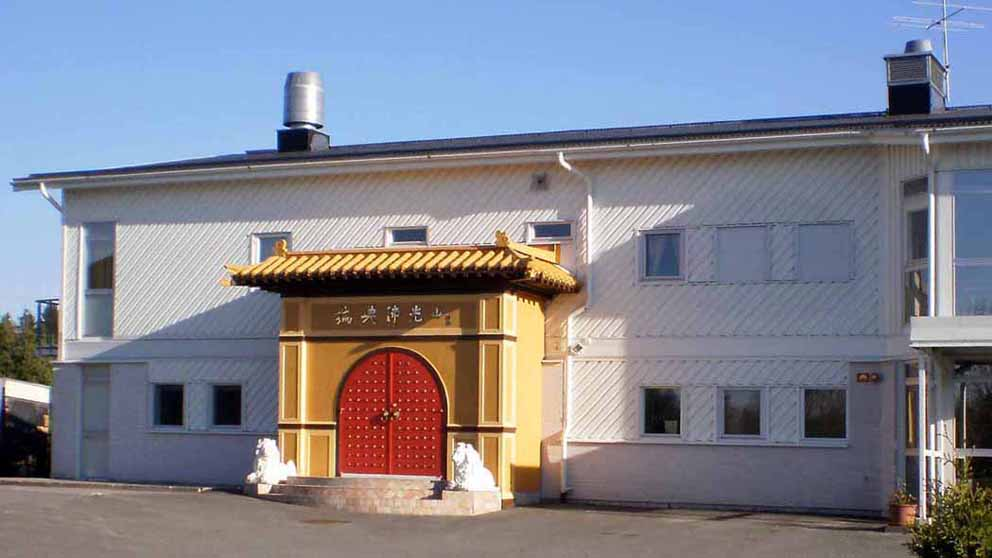
A temple of Chinese Buddhism in Rosersberg, Stockholm.

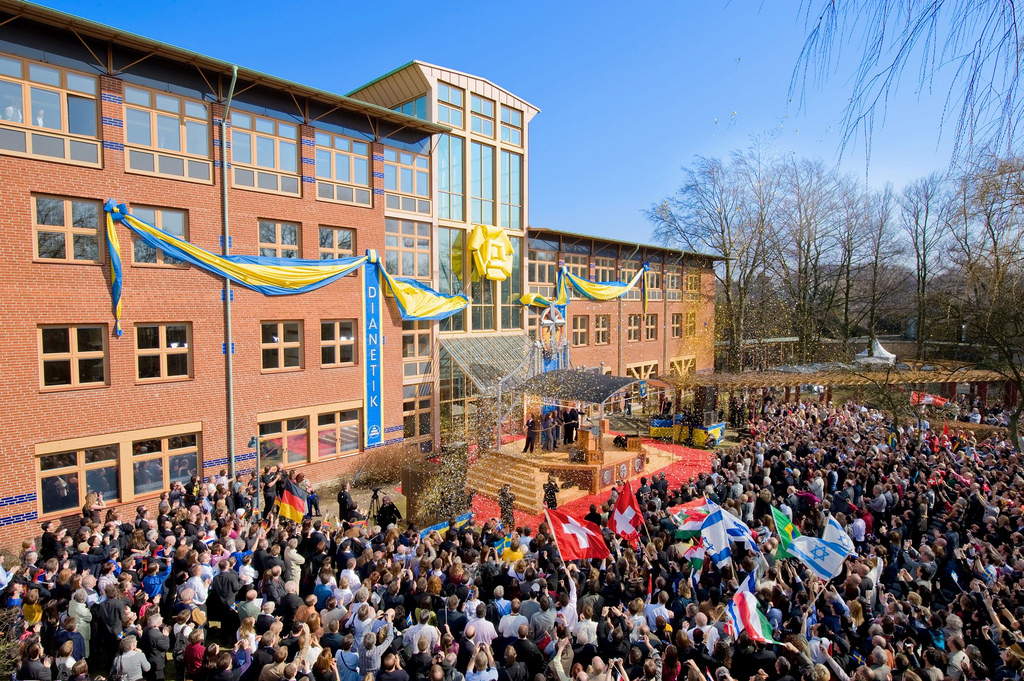
Church of Scientology in Malmö.

Sweden doesn't gather statistics on the basis of ethnicity or religion. The constitution of Sweden provides for freedom of religion, and the government generally respects this right in practice. The government at all levels seeks to protect this right in full and does not tolerate its abuse, either by governmental or private actors. The rights and freedoms enumerated in the constitution include the rights to practice one's religion and protection of religious freedom. The laws concerning religious freedoms are generally observed and enforced at all government levels and by the courts in a non-discriminatory fashion. Legal protections cover discrimination or persecution by private actors.

In the early 2000s about 80% of Swedes belonged to the Church of Sweden. By the end of 2021, this figure had fallen to 53.9%. Other religious organizations keep count of their registered membership, and as reported in the table, as of 2021 the largest religious denominations after the Church of Sweden (53.9%) were the officially registered Muslims (2.1%), members of the Orthodox Church (1.5%), Catholics (1.2%) and members of the Swedish Pentecostal Movement (1.1%).

Eight recognized religious denominations, in addition to the Church of Sweden, raise revenues through member-contributions made through the national tax system. All recognized denominations are entitled to direct government financial support, contributions made through the national tax system, or a mix of both. Certain Christian holidays are national holidays. Individuals in the military may observe their the holidays from their own religious background, in exchange for not taking leave on public holidays. There is no legal requirement for religious groups to register with the government; however, only those faith communities which are registered can receive government funding and tax exemptions.

Religious education is compulsory in public schools. Parents may send their children to religious charter schools, all of which receive school vouchers, provided they adhere to government guidelines on core academic curriculum. The Equality Ombudsman investigates claims of discrimination; discrimination on religious grounds is illegal.

=== Surveys ===
In 2017, the Pew Research Center's Global Attitudes Survey found that 59.9% of the Swedes regarded themselves as Christians, with 48.7% belonging to the Church of Sweden, 9.5% were Unaffiliated Christians, 0.7% were Pentecostal Protestants, 0.4% were Catholics, the Eastern Orthodox and the Congregationalist were 0.3% each. Unaffiliated people were 35.0% divided in 18.8% Atheists, 11.9% nothing in particular and 4.3% Agnostics. Muslims were 2.2% and members of other religions were 2.5%.

In 2016 the International Social Survey Programme found that 70.2% of the Swedish population declared belonging to a Christian denomination, with the Church of Sweden being the largest church, accounting for the 65.8% of respondents; the Free Church was the second-largest church accounting for 2.8%, Roman Catholics were 0.7% and Eastern Orthodox were 0.5%; members of other Christian denominations comprised 0.4% of the total population. A further 28.5% declared no religion, 1.1% identified as Muslim and 0.3% declared belonging to other religions.

In 2015 the Eurobarometer found that Christianity was the religion of 47.6% of respondents, with Protestantism being the main denomination with 36.5%, followed by other Christians with 8.6%, Catholics with 1.6% and Eastern Orthodox with 0.8%. 31.0% of the sample identified as agnostic and 19.0% identified as atheist.

=== Confessional structure ===
Religion, formal affiliation (in 2021)	Members	Percent
Christianity	6,228,708	59.6%
Church of Sweden	5,563,351	53.2%
Eastern Christian Churches	160,266	1.5%
Catholic Church	126,286	1.2%
Pentecostal congregations	115,403	1.1%
Uniting Church in Sweden	111,456	1.1%
Evangelical Free Church	44,163	0.42%
Swedish Evangelical Mission	43,877	0.42%
Jehovah's Witnesses	22,188	0.21%
Swedish Alliance Mission	20,898	0.20%
Other Christians	20,820	0.20%
Non-Christian religions	261,807	2.5%
Islam	224,459	2.1%
Mandaeism	12,408	0.12%
Buddhism	12,328	0.12%
Judaism	8,153	0.08%
Alevism	4,459	0.04%
No affiliation or other religions	3,961,811	37.9%
Total	10,452,326	100.0%

== Christianity ==
The Swedish flag is formed by the Nordic Cross, symbol of Christianity.

In 2021 there were 6,228,708 formally affiliated Christians in Sweden, comprising 59.6% of the total population.

A survey by the Pew Research Center found in spring 2016 that 66.7% out of a sample of 1,000 Swedes claimed to be Christians. Another Pew study 2026 found only 58% of Swedish Christians believed in God.

As of 2016, 6,484,203 people, or 64.9% of the total population, were registered members of the various Protestant denominations in Sweden.

=== Church of Sweden ===
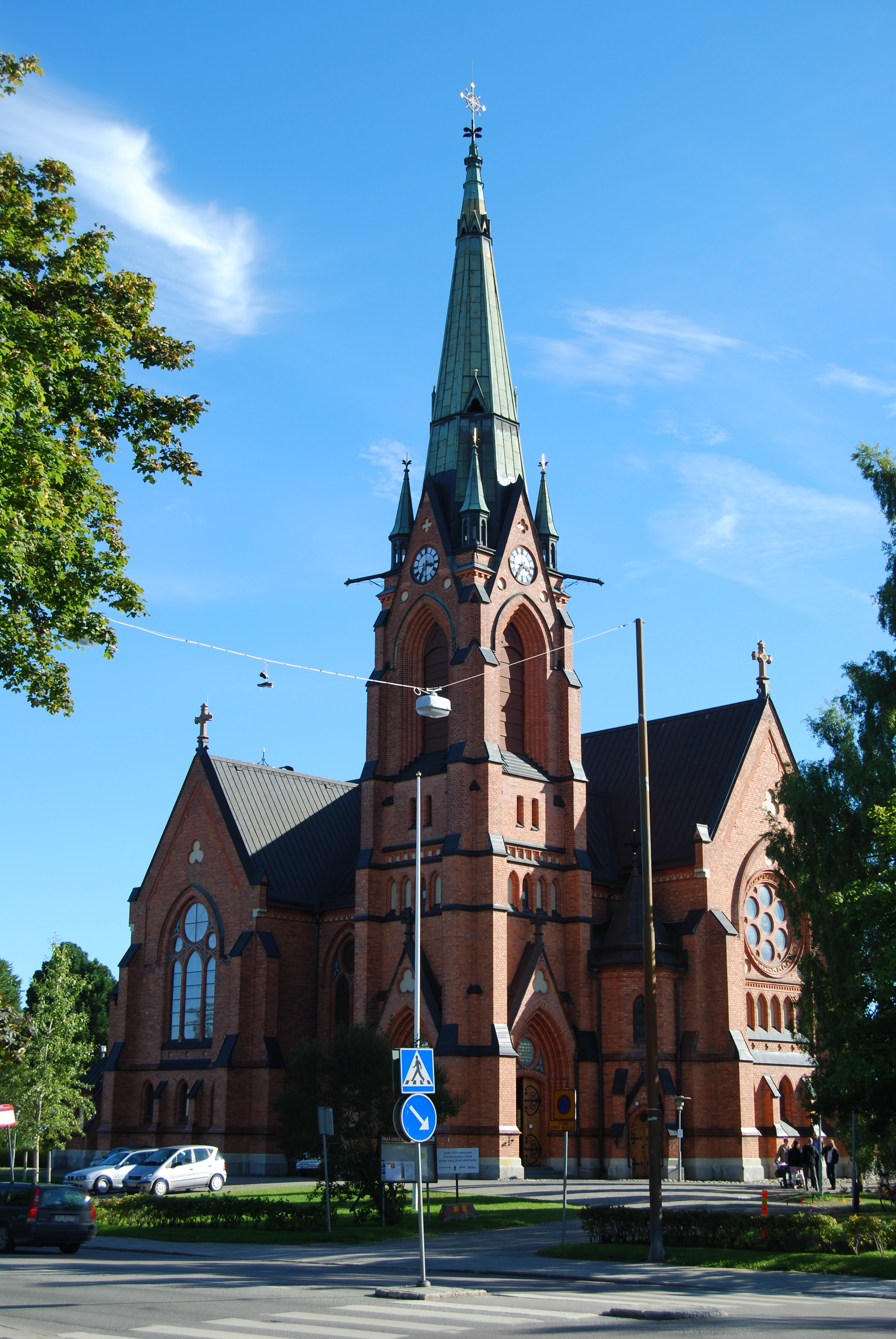
Umeå City Church.

Church of Sweden statistics
Year	Population	Church members	Percentage	% change (avg.)
1972	8,146,000	7,754,784	95.2%	
1975	8,208,000	7,770,881	94.7%	0.2% ▼
1980	8,278,000	7,690,636	92.9%	0.3% ▼
1985	8,358,000	7,629,763	91.5%	0.3% ▼
1990	8,573,000	7,630,350	89.0%	0.5% ▼
1995	8,837,000	7,601,194	86.0%	0.6% ▼
2000	8,880,000	7,360,825	82.9%	0.6% ▼
2005	9,048,000	6,967,498	77.0%	1.2% ▼
2010	9,415,570	6,589,769	70.0%	1.4% ▼
2015	9,850,452	6,225,091	63.2%	1.4% ▼
2016	9,995,153	6,109,546	61.1%	2.1% ▼
2017	10,120,242	5,993,368	59.3%	1.8% ▼
2018	10,230,185	5,899,242	57.7%	1.6% ▼
2019	10,327,579	5,823,515	56.4%	1.3% ▼
2020	10,379,295	5,728,746	55.2%	1.6% ▼
2021	10,452,326	5,633,867	53.9%	1.3% ▼
2022	10,521,556	5,563,351	52.8%	1.1% ▼
2023		5,484,319	52.1%	0.7% ▼
2024		5,426,053	51.4%	'0.7% ▼
2025		5,365,453	50.7%	0.7% ▼

|} Representing half of the population, the Church of Sweden (Swedish: Svenska kyrkan) is the largest Christian church in Sweden, and also the largest religious body. The church professes the Lutheran faith and is a member of the Porvoo Communion. As of 2025, it had 5,365.542 members, 50,7 % of the Swedish population, Until 2000 it held the position of state religion, and most Swedes were baptised at birth, until 1996 all newborns with at least one parent being a member of the Church of Sweden were also registered as members of the church. Yet the membership is declining rapidly, about 1% each year, falling from 95% in 1972 and 82% in 2000. The number of both new baptisms and members has declined since. Indeed, according to official statistics, as of 2021:

- About 1 out of 3 (35.2%) children are christened in the Church of Sweden.
- About 1 out of 4 (23.5%) weddings take place in church.
- About 2 out of 3 (66.8%) Swedes have Christian burials.

The Church of Sweden, by law, is organized in the following manner:

- It is an Evangelical Lutheran community of faith manifested in parishes and dioceses. The church also has a national organisation.
- It is an open national church which, working with a democratic organisation and through the ministry of the church, covers the whole nation.
- The primate of the Church of Sweden is the Archbishop of Uppsala.

=== Other Protestant denominations ===
The 19th century saw the arrival of various evangelical free churches, and, towards the end of the century secularism, leading many to distance themselves from church rituals. Leaving the Church of Sweden became legal with the so-called Dissenter Act of 1860, but only under the provision of entering another denomination. The right to not belong to any religious denomination was established in the law on freedom of religion in 1951.

Today, the Swedish Free Church Council (Swedish: Sveriges Frikyrkosamråd) organizes free churches in Sweden, belonging to various Protestant denominations: Calvinist, Pentecostal, and others. In total the member churches have around 250,000 members. Baptists, Methodists and the Mission Covenant Church of Sweden merged in 2011 into a new denomination: the Uniting Church in Sweden. It is the largest member church in the Swedish Free Church Council, with approximately 65,000 members. One of the Baptist denominations, the Evangelical Free Church in Sweden, has remained an independent denomination outside this merger.

=== Catholicism ===
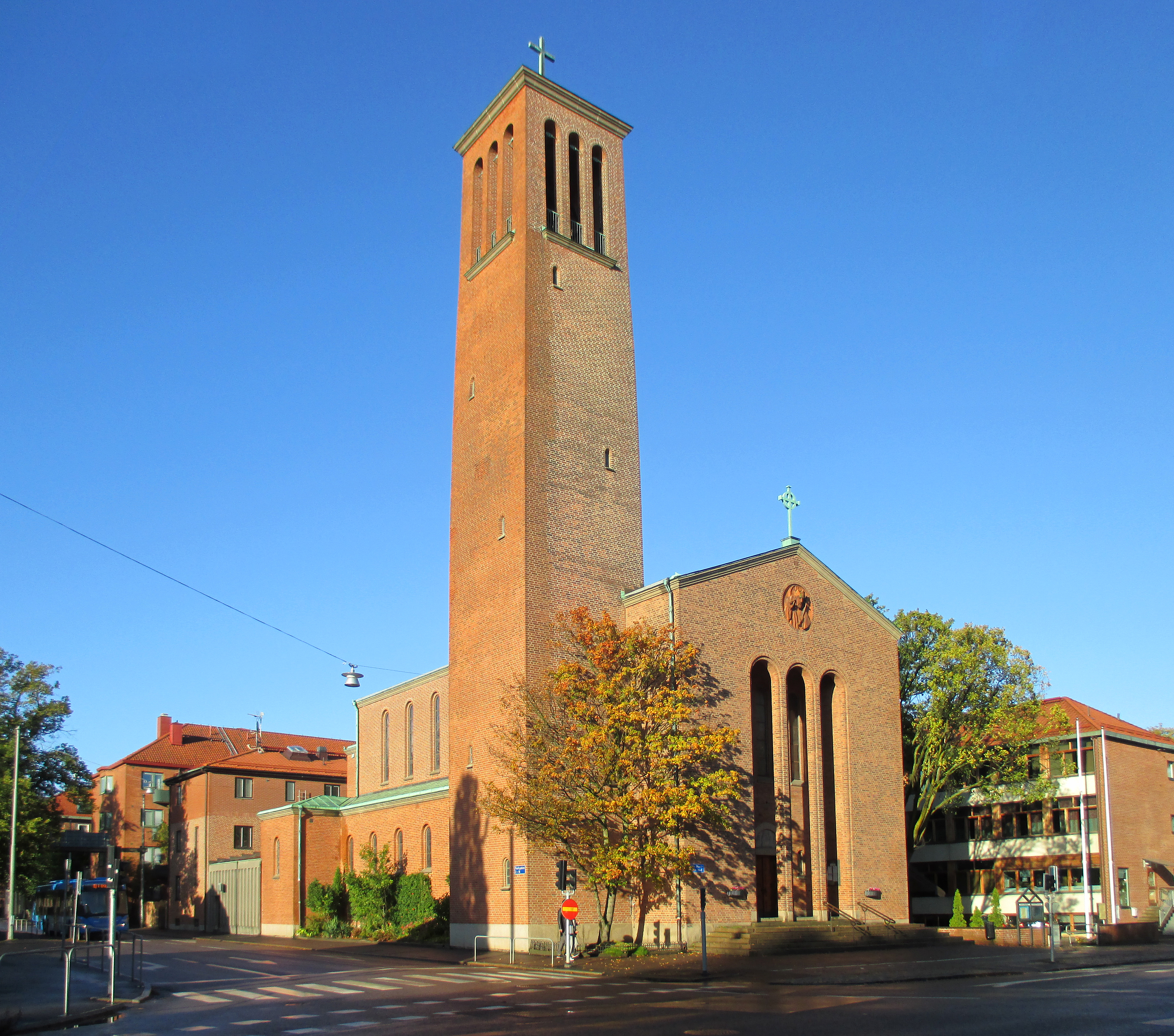
Catholic Church of Christ the King in Gothenburg.

Most Catholics in Sweden are of Slavic (especially Poles and Croats), South American or Middle Eastern (especially Assyrian) origin.

As of 2021, legally registered Catholics in Sweden were 126,286, comprising 1.2% of the total population, the same percentage was found in a spring 2016 survey in Sweden.

=== Eastern Christianity ===
Multiple Orthodox jurisdictions exist in Sweden, including but not limited to the Greek and Serbian Orthodox Churches. There is also a substantial presence of Syriac, Coptic and Ethiopian Orthodox Christians. The Serbian Orthodox Church has several parishes in Sweden, under jurisdiction of Serbian Orthodox Eparchy of Scandinavia. As of 2021, legally registered Eastern Orthodox Christians were 160,266 and they were the second-largest Christian denomination in Sweden, comprising 1.5% of the total population.

=== Restorationist ===
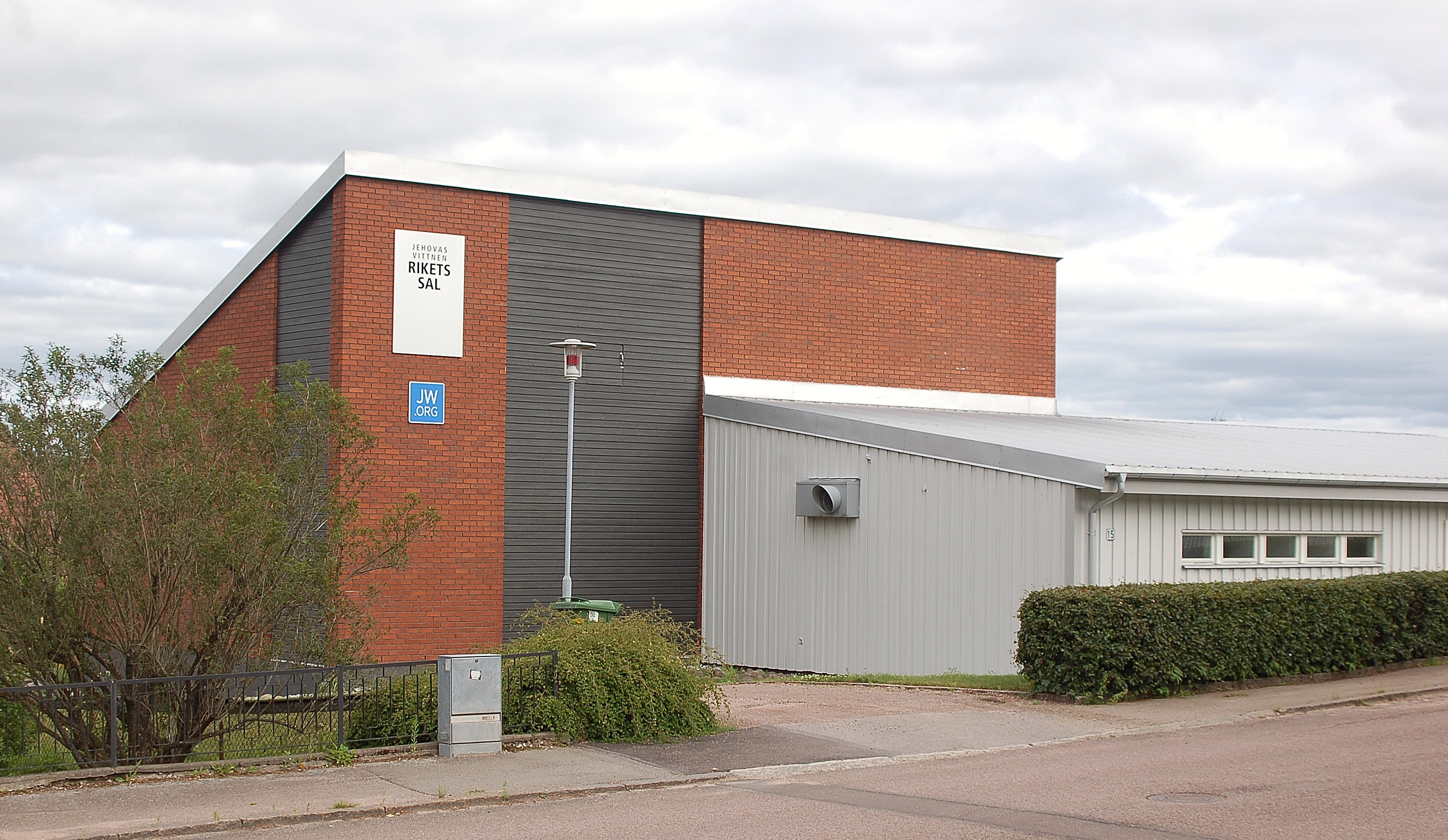
A Jehovah's kingdom hall in Kristinehamn.

==== Jehovah's Witnesses ====
According to the 2015 Yearbook of Jehovah's Witnesses, there are 22,730 active members in Sweden, and 36,270 people attended their annual memorial of Christ's death. This number includes active members and guests.

==== The Church of Jesus Christ of Latter-day Saints ====
The Church of Jesus Christ of Latter-Day Saints claims 9,528 members in 40 congregations in Sweden as of 2022.

== Other Abrahamic religions ==
=== Islam ===
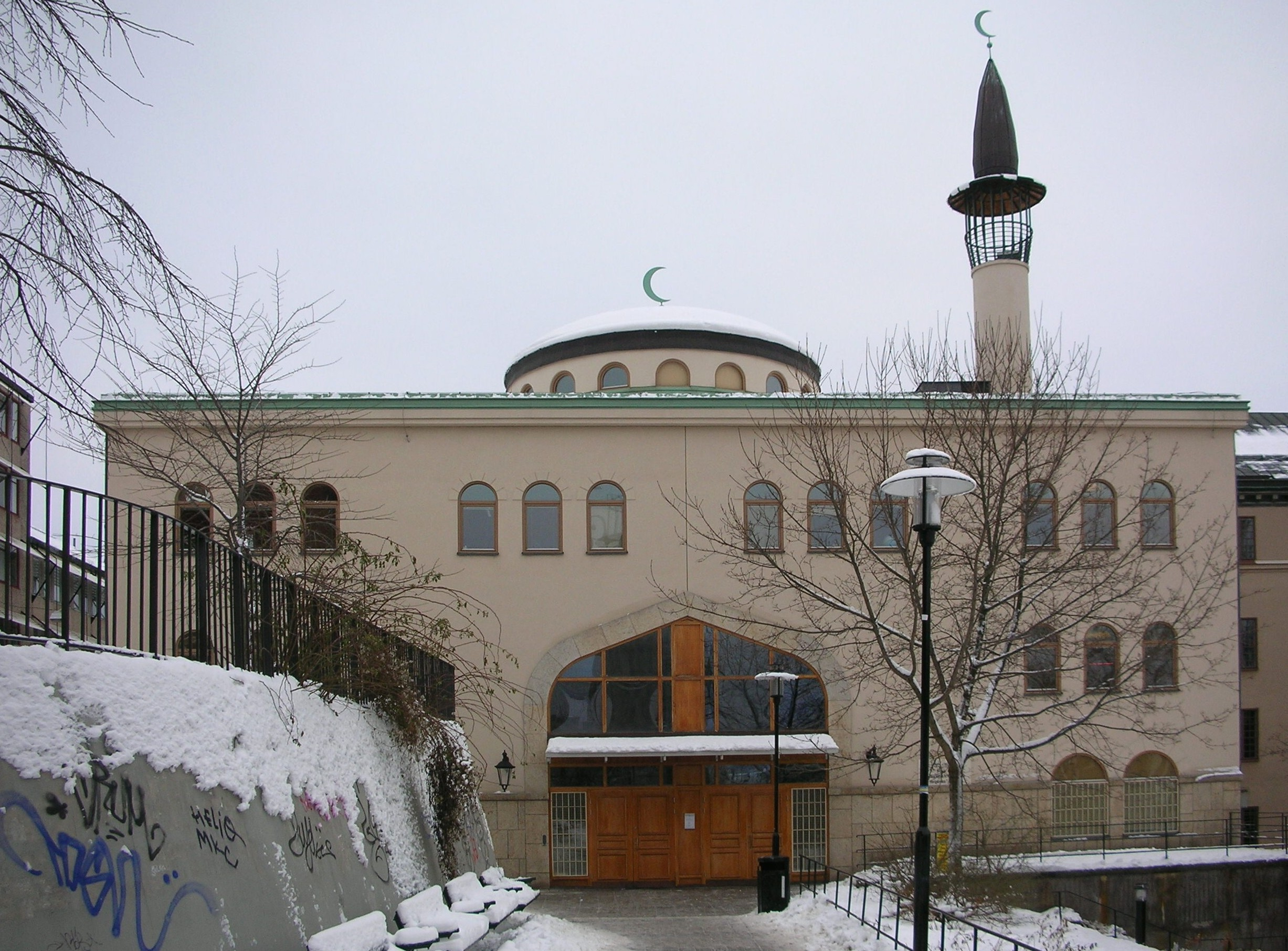
Stockholm Mosque.

Islam entered Sweden primarily through immigration from countries with large Muslim populations (such as Albania, Bosnia and Herzegovina, Turkey, Iraq, Morocco, Iran, Kosovo, Sandžak, Somalia and Syria) in the late 20th century. The Baltic Tatars were the first Muslim group in modern Sweden.

In 2021, Sweden's official statistics counted 224,459 formally affiliated Muslims. According to a 2016 Pew Research Center estimate, they are 8.1% of the Swedish population.

The Pew Research Center estimated in 2017 that Sweden's Muslim population by 2050 could grow to 31% in a high migration scenario, 21% in a medium scenario and 11% with no further Muslim migration.

=== Judaism ===
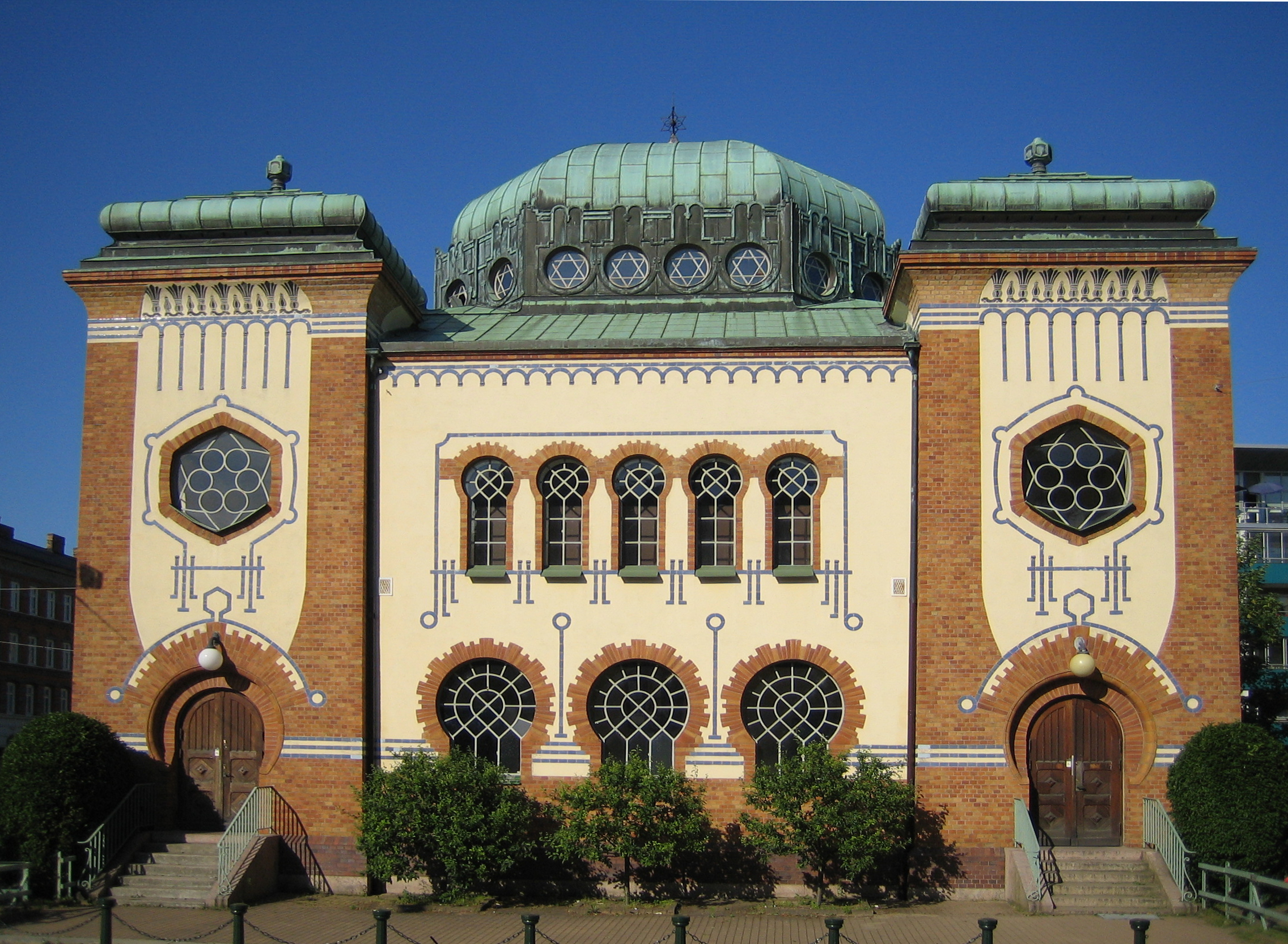
Malmö Synagogue.

The Official Council of Swedish Jewish Communities estimates about 20,000 ethnic Jews in Sweden by halakhic criteria. Of them, about 8,153 were members of a Jewish religious congregation in 2021.

Stockholm has the largest community and boasts a primary school, a kindergarten, a library, a bi-monthly publication (Judisk Krönika) and a weekly Jewish radio program. Other cities like Malmö, Gothenburg, Borås, Helsingborg, Lund, and Uppsala have Jewish communities as well. Synagogues can be found in Stockholm (which has two Orthodox and one Conservative synagogue), Göteborg (one Orthodox and one Conservative synagogue), Malmö (one Orthodox synagogue), and in Norrköping (although the Norrköping community is too small to perform regular services).

=== Bahá'í Faith ===
In 2020, the Bahá'ís claimed about 1,000 members and 25 local assemblies in Sweden from Umeå in the north to Malmö in the south.

In November 2009 the Swedish paper Västerbottens-Kuriren reported that 25 local non-profit Bahá'í organization had changed their organizational form to religious communions. The central Bahá'í secretariat in Stockholm stated at the time that the Bahá'i Faith in Sweden had 1003 members.

== Dharmic religions ==
=== Buddhism ===
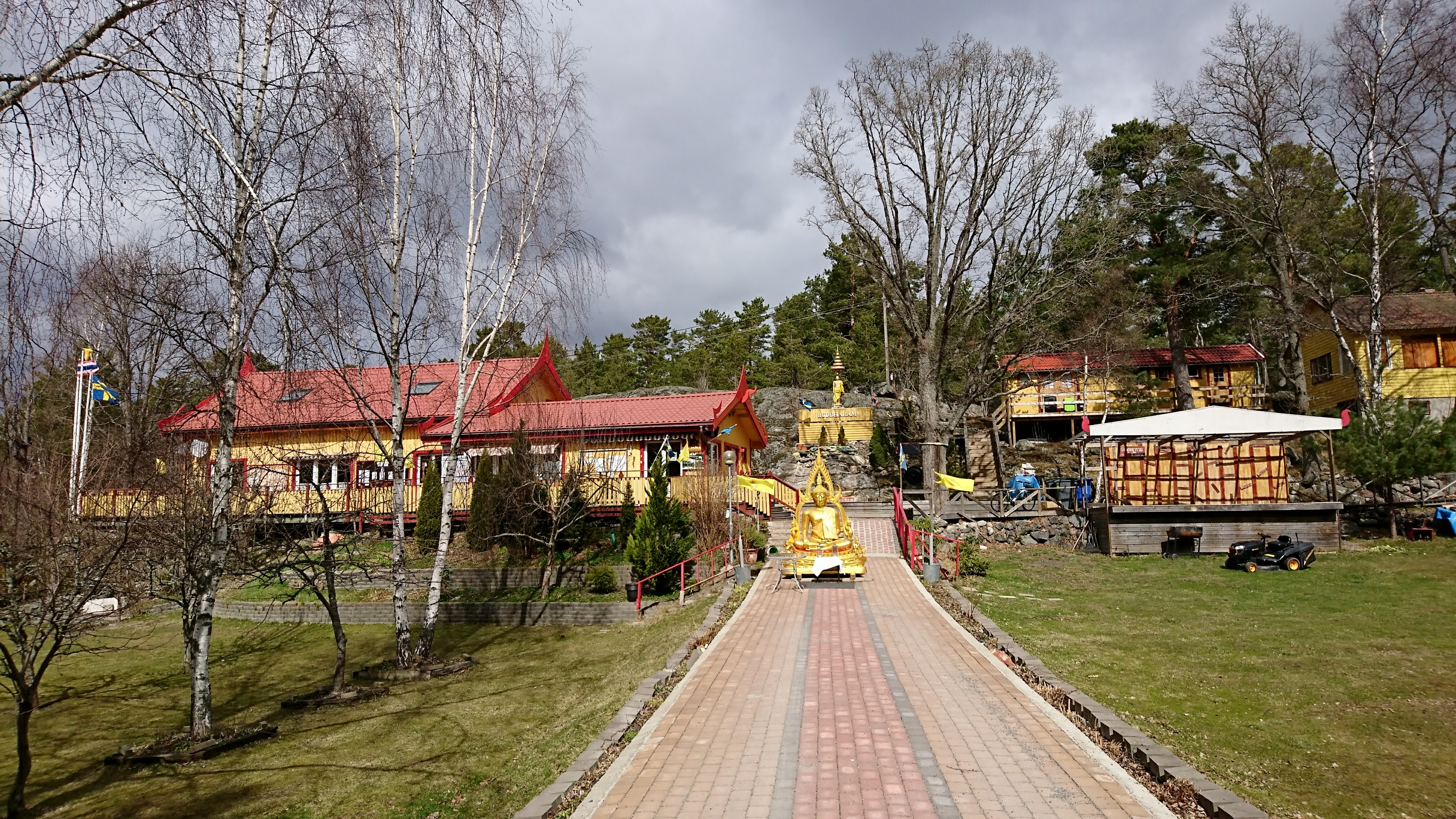
Buddharama Temple in Torsby.

Buddhism is relatively well-established in Sweden with both organisations focussing on ethnic East Asians and others oriented towards converts. In 2021, there were 12,328 formally affiliated Buddhists in Sweden, comprising 0.12% of the total population. However, it is thought that the actual number of Buddhists is much higher since only members of organized faith communities are reflected in the Swedish Agency for Support to Faith Communities's statistics. In April 2020, the number of Buddhists was estimated in to be around 57,000 people, around 0.7% of Sweden's population.

=== Hinduism ===
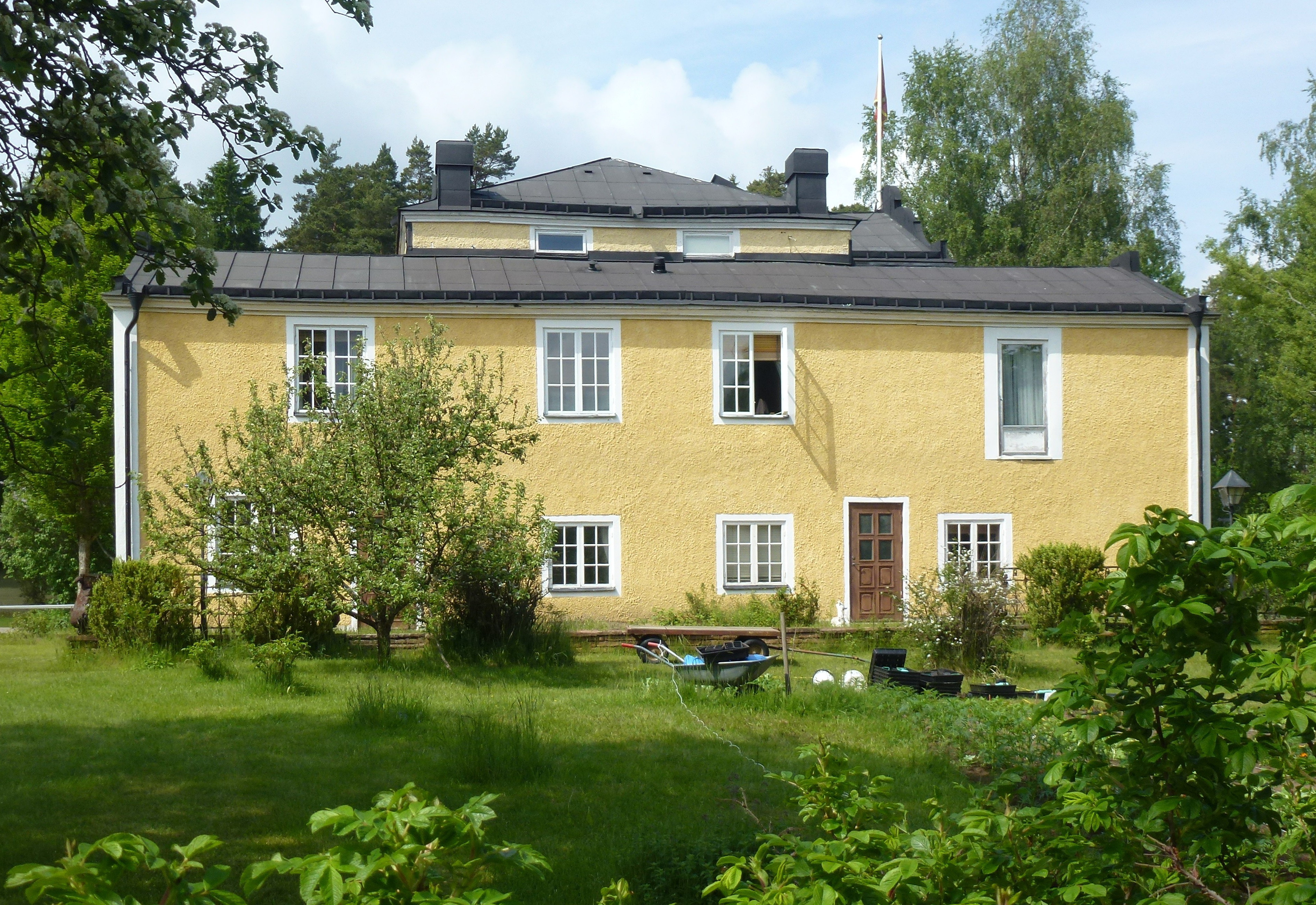
Korsnäs gård, main building 2014.

The 2005 International Religious Freedom Report stated that there are between 7,000 and 10,000 Hindus in the country at that time.

=== Sikhism ===
Sikhism in Sweden (Swedish: Sikhismen i Sverige) is a very small religious minority, there are approximately 4,000 adherents, most of which are settled in Stockholm and Gothenburg, each of which has two gurdwaras.

== Germanic Heathenism ==
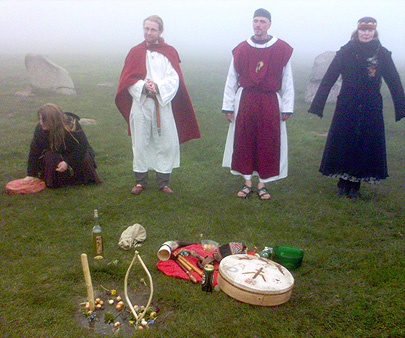
Members of Forn Sed Sweden holding a sacrifice.

Germanic Heathenry, the contemporary continuation of ancient Germanic religion, is represented by various organizations, including the Nordic Asa-Community (Nordiska Asa-samfundet), the Swedish Forn Sed Assembly (Samfundet Forn Sed Sverige) and the Community for Nordic Faith (Samfälligheten för Nordisk Sed). Founded in 2014, the Nordic Asa-Community has quickly grown to become the largest Heathen organization in Sweden, despite being the most recently established among the three.

== Irreligion ==
According to Britannica, in 2016, 30% of the population was "none/unspecified".

== Freedom of religion ==
In 2023, the country was scored 4 out of 4 for freedom of religion or belief.

== See also ==
- Christianization of Scandinavia
- Religion in Europe
- Religion by country
- Demographics of atheism
- Sámi shamanism
