= Khadija Mosque (Malmö) =

Mosque in Malmö, Skåne, Sweden

- Khadija moské
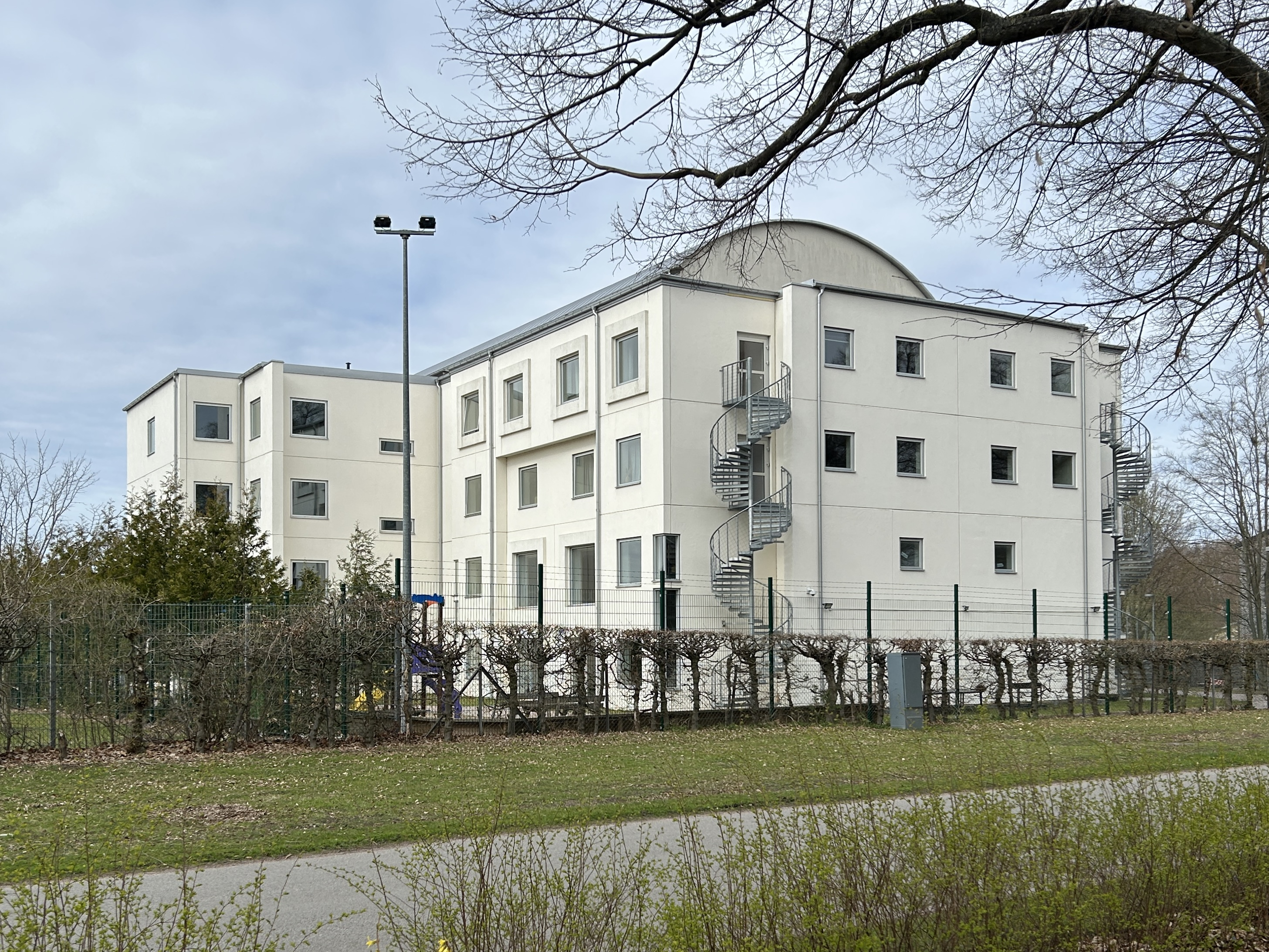

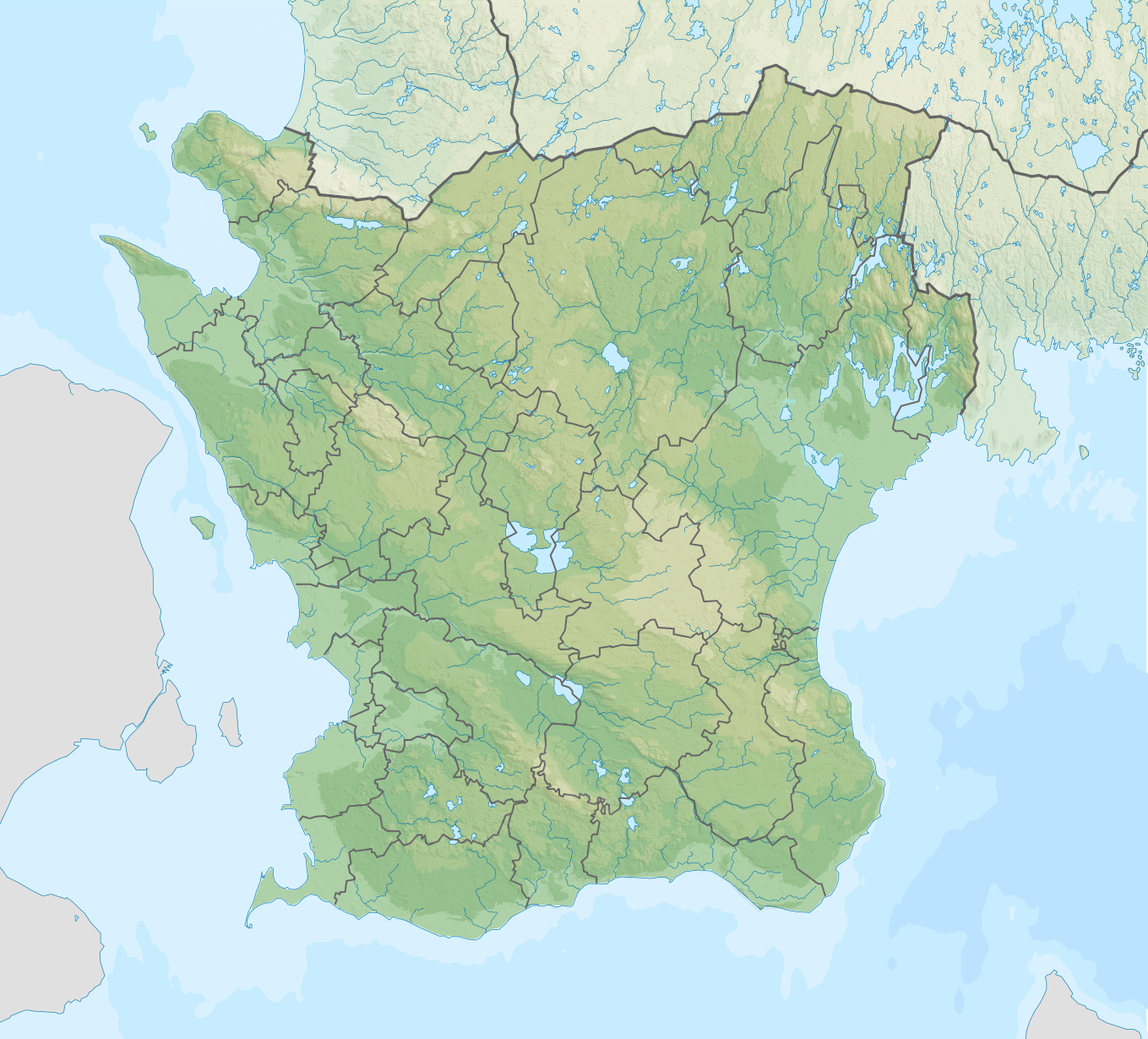
- Location within Skåne

Religion
- Affiliation: Islam
- Branch/tradition: Sunni

Location
- Location: Danska vägen 26, Malmö, Skåne, Sweden
- Interactive map of Khadija Mosque
- Coordinates: 55°35′39″N 13°02′23″E

Architecture
- Type: mosque
- Completed: 2017

Website
- www.wakf.se

Khadija Mosque (Swedish: Umm al-Muminin Khadija-moské) is a mosque in Malmö, Skåne County, Sweden. The mosque opened in 2017 and is the largest in Scandinavia with a capacity of 2000 people.

== See also ==
- Islam in Sweden
- Religion in Sweden
