= Mission Covenant Church of Sweden =

Swedish Christian denomination

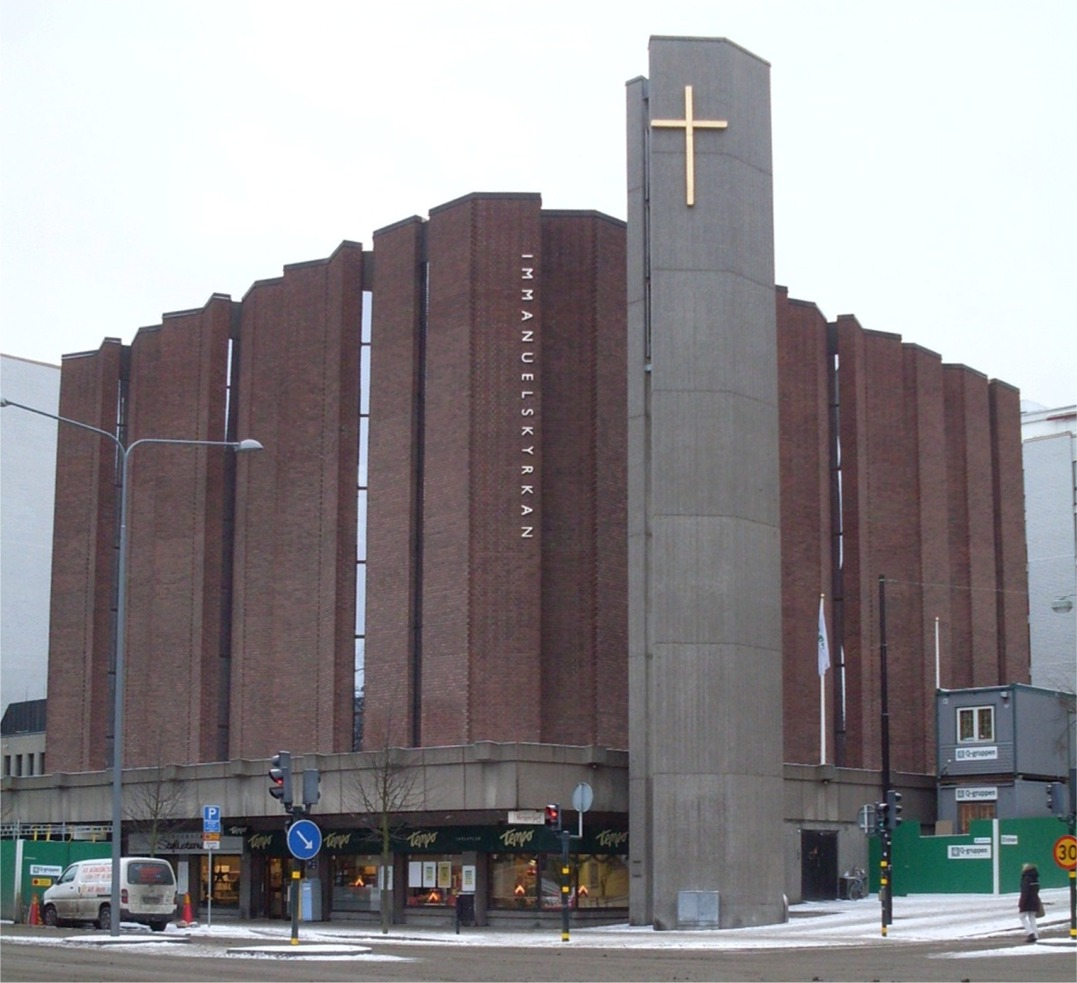
- Immanuel Church, Stockholm, in January 2009
- Classification: Protestant
- Theology: Radical Pietist
- Region: Sweden
- Origin: 1878
- Merged into: Uniting Church in Sweden, 2012
- Members: 61,000 (2009)

The Mission Covenant Church of Sweden (Swedish: Svenska Missionskyrkan – until 2003 Svenska Missionsförbundet 'Swedish Mission Covenant'), founded in 1878, was a Swedish evangelical free church in the Radical Pietist tradition. It was the second-largest Protestant denomination in Sweden, after the national church, the Church of Sweden. In 2011, the Mission Covenant Church of Sweden completed a merger with two other denominations, resulting in the new denomination Uniting Church in Sweden (in Swedish: Equmeniakyrkan). The denomination was a member of the Swedish Free Church Council, the International Federation of Free Evangelical Churches, and the World Communion of Reformed Churches.

== History ==
The Mission Covenant Church of Sweden was a breakaway from the Lutheran Church of Sweden. As a movement it had roots in Radical Pietism and the spiritual awakenings of the 19th century such as Nyevangelism 'new Evangelism'. When Swedish Covenanters emigrated to the United States and Canada in the last half of the 19th century, they formed the Evangelical Covenant Church (see Mission Friends). The denominations are independent of each other but have maintained fraternal ties. The forming of the Swedish Mission Covenant was one of the first steps in forming free-church denominations in Sweden after the 1858 repeal of the Conventicle Act.

The Swedish Evangelical Mission (Evangeliska fosterlandsstiftelsen 'Evangelical Homeland Foundation', EFS), from which the Mission Covenant Church of Sweden came, was founded in 1856. EFS was and is a movement within the Lutheran Church of Sweden and thus does not constitute a separate denomination. EFS had many affiliated local associations (missionary associations and EFS groups, with at least earlier names such as Evangelical Lutheran Missionary Society, Lutheran Missionary Society, Missionary Society, Chapel Society and Evangelical Lutheran Missionary Assembly).

The 1870s was a period of new ideas and divisions within the Church of Sweden. Priest Paul Petter Waldenström's new view of the atonement as being humanity's reconciliation with God – rather than the opposite – was one that many followers in Pietistic circles began to follow after its publication in Pietisten, "the theological journal of Nyevangelism". This led to a demand that the Swedish Evangelical Mission's missionaries should not be obliged to adhere to the Augsburg Confession. There was also a desire in some quarters to break with the church's order of communion; Waldenström began to distribute communion outside of the church, a factor leading to his resignation. Jakob Ekman spearheaded the founding of the Mission Covenant Church of Sweden in 1878 and would become its first president. When a proposal to change the Swedish Evangelical Mission's confessional stance was rejected at its 1878 conference, the Mission Covenant Church was founded at a preachers' meeting in the Baptists' Bethel Chapel in Stockholm. Waldenström had previously been dismissed from his position as EFS representative. From the start and for several decades, Mission Covenant members were called Waldenströmers.

=== Missions ===
The church sent numerous missionaries to many countries around the world, such as China in the 19th and early 20th centuries, in particular Xinjiang, Japan, India, Russia and Caucasus, Nicaragua, Costa Rica and Ecuador, Alaska, Spain and, in numbers of missionaries the largest field, Democratic Republic of the Congo and the Republic of Congo. In many other countries there were missionary projects.

The SMF also included missions in other countries in its program from 1880 and sent its first missionaries the same year: Carl Johan Engvall to the Congo in the service of the Livingstone Inland Mission, which was the start of the Swedish Congo Mission (Svenska kongomissionen). Högberg was sent to Russia and J. E. Ågren, A. Lindgren and K. J. Gustafsson to Lapland. From the early 1880s, there were several different missionary cooperative organizations in Sweden: the Swedish Church Mission (from 1876), the Swedish Evangelical Mission (from 1865), the Swedish Alliance Mission (from the early 1900s) and the Swedish Alliance Mission (from 1880). The Baptist Union of Sweden's congregations also had missionary activities (from 1881). The Swedish Holiness Union (Helgelseförbundet, today part of the Evangelical Free Church in Sweden) came in 1887, the Örebro Mission in 1892 and the Swedish Pentecostal movement began its missionary activities after 1911.

Missionaries and preachers were trained at two mission schools, located in Vinslöv in Scania and in Kristinehamn in eastern Värmland. The mission school in Kristinehamn was established as early as 1871 by Värmlands Ansgariiförening but was taken over in 1878 or 1879 by the Swedish Mission Covenant. It moved in 1890 to Stockholm and in 1908 to Stockby in Lidingö. It is today known as Lidingö Folk High School. The originally two-year preacher training program became three years in 1888 and four years in 1915. The school's directors were Andreas Fernholm (1871–1872), Karl Hultkrantz (1874–1878), Jakob Ekman (1878–1886), N. F. Graflund (1886–1888), N. Wikander (1888–1910), Paul Petter Waldenström (1910–1912) and Gustav Mosesson (1912–1937).

=== Theology ===
The Mission Covenant Church of Sweden primarily held to the legacy of Lutheran Nyevangelism, Waldenström, and low-churchism, along with reformed, evangelical and charismatic elements. This did not prevent it from belonging internationally to the World Alliance of Reformed Churches. Its organizational form was congregationalism. Waldenström's legacy included a desire for ecumenism, which was expressed, for instance, in communion with the Church of Sweden, membership in the World Council of Churches and close cooperation with the Baptist Union of Sweden and the United Methodist Church in Sweden.

The church held a tradition of freedom for individuals and congregations in theological matters; one example is dual views on baptism (both infant baptism and believer's baptism); another example is on the view of the Bible, which includes both liberal theological and evangelical views. At its founding, the Mission Covenant Church broke with Lutheran orthodoxy due to the doctrine of atonement, contrary to the teachings of the Church of Sweden; thus, Waldenström lost his office as a priest, the Swedish Evangelical Mission split, and the Mission Covenant Church of Sweden was formed. There are also those who see a reformed influence already present in Carl Olof Rosenius of the Swedish Evangelical Mission and more clearly in Waldenström.

The Mission Covenant Church of Sweden's tradition of ecumenism and freedom makes it difficult to place on the theological map. While it was a member of the World Alliance of Reformed Churches, its theology and practice showed a heritage from Luther rather than Calvin. Due to free church and reformed elements and the fact that it did not affirm the Lutheran creeds, membership in the Lutheran World Federation is not relevant. Since infant baptism was the most common form of baptism in the Mission Covenant Church, the church cannot be described as Baptist; the European Baptist Federation, for example, clearly states that believer's baptism is the biblical form of baptism. Even believer's baptism is practiced and sometimes rebaptism of infants is practiced; therefore, there was a certain kinship with the Baptist movement in terms of views on baptism. Since re-baptism can be a problem for ecumenism, the Mission Covenant Church introduced an act of baptismal confirmation to replace re-baptism.

=== Organisation ===
The church had 61,000 members in 700 congregations in 2009.

Prior to 2003, the Mission Covenant Church was called Svenska Missionsförbundet (literally 'Swedish Mission Covenant', though the official English name already was Mission Covenant Church of Sweden at that time). The Swedish Salvation Army (Svenska Frälsningsarmén (SFA), which is a separate organisation from the international Salvation Army, which also operates in Sweden) was a non-territorial district of the church until its dissolution in 2016.

In 2011, the Mission Covenant Church of Sweden completed a long-planned merger with the Baptist Union of Sweden and the United Methodist Church of Sweden. The new denomination was called Joint Future Church until the new name Equmeniakyrkan (Uniting Church in Sweden) was adopted by the general assembly in May 2013.

== Notable members ==
- Gustaf Ahlbert
- Carl Boberg
- Karl Edvard Laman
- Lars Leijonborg
- Paul Petter Waldenström

== See also ==
- Evangelical Covenant Church
- University College Stockholm
- List of MCCS Missionaries in Chinese Turkestan
