= John Ongman =

Swedish Baptist pastor (1844–1931)

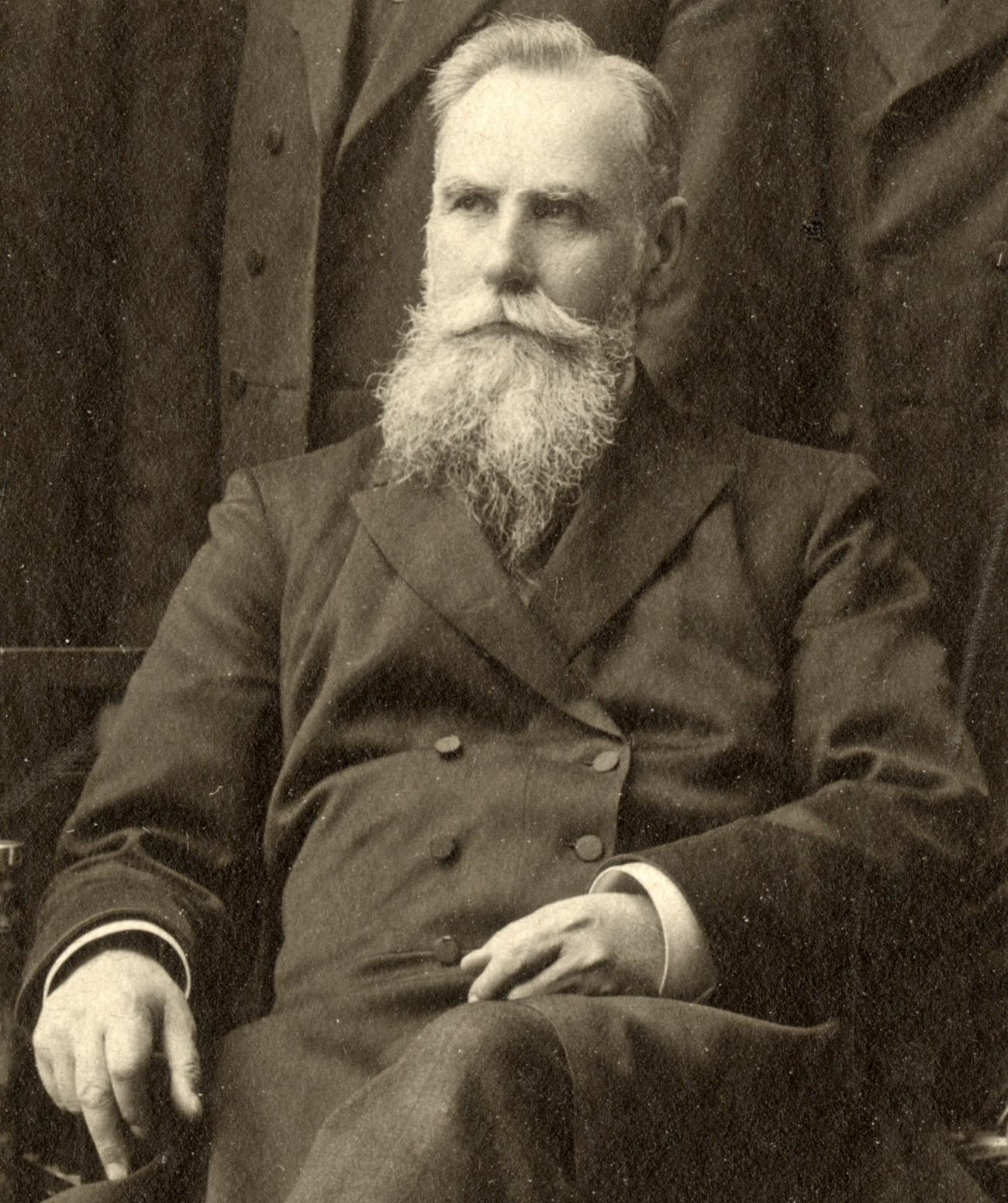
- John Ongman in 1908
- Born: November 15, 1844; Långsved, Myssjö parish, Berg Municipality, Jämtland, Sweden
- Died: February 28, 1931 (aged 86); Örebro, Närke, Sweden
- Other names: Johan Ångman
- Occupation: Baptist pastor
- Spouses: Christina Andersdotter (m. 1865; died 1871) Vilhelmina Eriksson (m. 1872; died 1872) Hanna Holmgren (m. 1894)
- Parent(s): Nils Sköld and Maria Johansdotter

John Ongman (November 15, 1844 – February 28, 1931) was a Swedish Baptist pastor and founder of the Örebro Missionary Society and Örebro Missionary School. He also was the first pastor of the First Swedish Baptist Church in Saint Paul, Minnesota and also a pastor of the First Swedish Baptist Church in Chicago. He was an energetic evangelist and influential leader of the Swedish Baptists both in America and Sweden.

== Upbringing ==
He was the fourth of six siblings and grew up in a Christian home. His father, Nils Sköld, was a soldier by profession and his mother, Maria Laurentia Sten, came from a blacksmith family with roots in Norway. Ongman went to school for four years and at the age of 17 he traditionally enlisted as a soldier in the Jämtland Ranger Corps to follow in his father's footsteps. It was in the military that he was given the name Ångman (possibly because at the age of 18 he lived in Ångmon/Ångron), which was later rewritten in English as Ongman.

== Conversion and work ==
In 1864, he visited his friend Karl Hansson, who was newly saved, and Ongman also accepted salvation at the age of eighteen. He was baptized in Myssjö Baptist Church in Kövra, Sweden, on March 4 (or March 1) in an opening in frozen Lake Storsjön and soon began to preach. In 1866 he began full-time preaching and traveling, and on May 14, 1868, he traveled to the United States for the first time. He first worked as pastor in Red Wing, Minnesota as well as for the American Baptist Home Mission Society.

In 1873 he was called as a pastor to Saint Paul, Minnesota, where he founded the first Swedish-speaking Baptist congregation in the city that same year. He moved to Chicago in 1873 and became pastor of another Swedish Baptist church while studying at the Swedish branch of the Baptist Union Theological Seminary for a few years. In 1881 he moved back to Saint Paul, Minnesota, where he lived (with the exception of 1885–1886) until he moved back to Sweden.

In 1889 he was called to pastor the Örebro Baptist Church, where he began his ministry in 1890 and where he served until the formation of the Filadelfia Baptist church of Örebro, where he became pastor in 1897. During the 1890s Ongman had been active as a Bible school teacher and founder of the Örebro Missionary Society (1892). In 1908 he founded the Örebro Missionary School for the training of domestic preachers and missionaries.

Ongman was succeeded after his death in 1931 by the editor of Missionsbaneret, Pastor Algot Ahlbäck.

== Personal life ==
Ongman was married three times. His first wife was Christina Andersdotter, who died in 1871. He married his second wife, Vilhelmine (Mimmi) Eriksson, in 1872; she died in 1892. Ongman married for a third time in 1894 to Johanna (Hanna) Holmgren. According to those close to him, he was a true man of prayer who was not particularly theoretically or intellectually inclined, but who won people's respect through the love and care he showed. He was said to be passionate about missions work and often went his own way in order to, according to him, stand firm in and be faithful to God's call.

John Ongman is buried in Nikolai cemetery in Örebro.

== Bibliography ==
- Väckelse- och lofsånger. 1. Örebro 1890.
- Väckelse- och lofsånger / samlade, öfversatta och bearbetade av John Ongman. Örebro 1891.
- Väckelse- och lofsånger / samlade, öfversatta och bearbetade av John Ongman. Örebro 1892.
- Väckelse- och lofsånger. 2. Örebro 1893.
- Dopets betydelse eller ett försök att utjemna klyftan mellan barndöparne och baptisterna. Örebro 1896.
- Kvinnans rätt att förkunna evangelium. Askersund 1896.
- Väckelse- och lofsånger / samlade, öfversatta och bearbetade av John Ongman. Örebro 1899.
- Kristlig offervillighet eller det fördärfbringande festväsendet. Örebro 1900.
- Ungdomen och lefnadskallet : Föredrag vid ungdomskonferens i Stockholm. Uppsala 1901.
- Dopets betydelse eller ett försök att utjemna klyftan mellan barndöparne och baptisterna. Örebro 1903.
- Bibelns enhetlighet : föreläsning. Örebro 1906.
- Finnes det frälsning efter döden? Örebro 1908.
- Guds församling : Tvenne föreläsningar. Örebro 1909.
- Varningsrop i affallstider : några villfarelser framställda i biblisk belysning. Örebro 1910.
- Blod och eld : Föredrag. Örebro 1911.
- Kortfattad framställning af bibelns grundsanningar. Örebro 1911.
- Församlingsläraren och hans kall. Örebro 1913.
- Herren kommer : Profetiornas uppfyllelse. Örebro 1915.
- Kortfattad framställning af bibelns grundsanningar. Örebro 1916.
- Herren kommer : Profetiornas uppfyllelse. Örebro 1917.
- Kortfattad framställning av förutsättningarna för en sund bibeltolkning och försoning genom Jesus Kristus i skriftens ljus. Örebro 1920.
- Kortfattad framställning af bibelns grundsanningar. Örebro 1921.
- Dopet i den helige ande. Örebro 1921.
- Ungdomen och levnadskallet. Örebro 1924.
- Finnes det frälsning efter döden? Örebro 1926.
- Kortfattad framställning av bibelns grundsanningar. Örebro 1928.
- Församlingsläraren och hans kall. Örebro 1929.
- Samlade skrifter, vol 1–3. Örebro 1931–1934.
