= The Pentecostal Alliance of Independent Churches =

Swedish Pentecostal Christian denomination

The Pentecostal Alliance of Independent Churches (Swedish: Pingst - fria församlingar i samverkan, Pingst FFS) is a Pentecostal Christian denomination in Sweden. It is a member of the Pentecostal World Fellowship.

Pelle Hörnmark took over as leader for second time in 2024, having previously led the movement from 2008-2016.

== History ==
The movement has its origins in the establishment of the first Pentecostal church in Stockholm in 1910.

In 2001, the Pentecostal Alliance of Independent Churches was founded.

In 2017, the denomination had 439 churches and 87,392 members.

== PMU Interlife ==
PMU Interlife is a non-governmental humanitarian organization established by the Pentecostal Alliance in 1965 and originally called Pentecostal Mission's Third World Aid. PMU Interlife manages international development efforts with the support of the Swedish International Development Cooperation Agency.

== Ecumenical cooperation ==
Together with the Swedish Alliance Mission and the Evangelical Free Church in Sweden, the church operates the Academy for Leadership and Theology (ALT).

== See also ==
- Swedish Pentecostal Movement
