= Baptist Union of Sweden =

Former Baptist denomination in Sweden

- Classification: Baptist (Swedish Baptists)
- Orientation: Protestantism
- Theology: Baptist
- Headquarters: Sweden
- Separated from: Swedish Evangelical Mission
- Separations: Free Baptist Union (1872), Swedish Pentecostal Movement (early 1900s), Örebro Mission (1936)

The Baptist Union of Sweden (Swedish: Svenska Baptistsamfundet) was a Baptist union in Sweden. In 2011–2012, they merged to form a new denomination, Joint Future Church, now called Uniting Church in Sweden.

After breaking away from the Swedish Evangelical Mission, a group of committed believers established the first known Baptist church in Sweden, which was organized on September 21, 1848, in Vallersvik. The Conventicle Act was in effect at the time, outlawing all religious meetings other than those of the Lutheran Church of Sweden. The new movement's leader, F.O. Nilsson, was exiled. Others were fined or jailed. A few years later, in 1858, the law was abolished, and religious groups other than the official state church (free churches) were allowed to work.

== History ==
A general conference was formed in 1857 through the work of pastor Anders Wiberg and others. By 1866, the conference had established a seminary, Betelseminariet, and the conference later formed the Swedish Baptist Union in 1889.

In 1934 the Swedish Baptist Union attained its highest membership, 68,000. In 2006 it reported a total of 17,000 members in 223 parishes.

The Union has suffered two divisions, the first leading to the formation of the Free Baptist Union (Fribaptistsamfundet) in 1872, and the second to the Örebro Mission (Örebromissionen) (started in 1892, but separated from the Union in 1936).

The Baptist Union of Sweden was a member of the Swedish Free Church Council, the European Baptist Federation, and the Baptist World Alliance. It was the first Swedish church to appoint a woman as head of the assembly. It was led by Karin Wiborn (2007).

As of 2008, 220 parishes were affiliated with the Baptist Union of Sweden, consisting of more than 17,000 members. Many parishes were also connected to other church communions. For years there were ongoing discussions regarding a closer relationship with the Mission Covenant Church of Sweden (Svenska Missionskyrkan) and the United Methodist Church in Sweden (Metodistkyrkan i Sverige). In the summer of 2008, the three church communions created a joint annual conference. Finally, in 2011–2012, they merged to form a new denomination, Joint Future Church, now called Uniting Church in Sweden.
