= Swedish Holiness Union =

Former Protestant denomination in Sweden

The Swedish Holiness Union (Swedish: Helgelseförbundet) was a Swedish free church denomination from 1887 to 1994.

Originally, the Holiness Union was a mission society, but gradually it became a denomination with a Baptist and evangelical orientation. In 1994, after five years of cooperation, the Holiness Union merged with the Free Baptist Union (Fribaptistsamfundet) into Helgelseförbundet/Fribaptistsamfundet, which in turn merged with Örebro Mission in 1997 to form the denomination Nybygget – kristen samverkan, called the Evangelical Free Church in Sweden since 2002.

== History ==
Like many other Swedish denominations, the Holiness Union emerged from the 19th century revival movement, particularly the Mission Friends. The revival that eventually became the Holiness Union broke out at Torp Manor in Närke in the 1880s, and was a lay-oriented movement with an emphasis on sanctification. The leaders were the manor's owner Edvard Hedin and the theological leader Carl Johan Axel Kihlstedt. Kihlstedt was originally a priest in the Church of Sweden, but in 1889 chose to resign his position there because of theological concerns.

Torp was geographically and spiritually close to Riseberga, where Olof Hedengren established Sweden's first evangelical chapel (bönhus) in 1855. The chapel was consecrated by Carl Olof Rosenius, a key figure in the revival movement. In this circle was also tailor and lay preacher August Carleson from Vintrosa, who would later prepare the ground for and participate in the formation of the Holiness Union.

The revival that eventually became the Holiness Union erupted near Torp's manor house on the Feast of the Annunciation in 1885 during a prayer meeting in a cottage where the participants strongly experienced the presence of God and the call to pray. The Holiness Union can be said to be a response to the Shouter movement (roparrörelsen), which with its strongly condemnatory preaching style created a need that was apparently answered in the Union's emphasis on grace and forgiveness.

At midsummer 1887, Hedin and his friends organized the Torp Conference in the manor's barn. The conference, which became an annual event, came to be the unifying meeting place of the Holiness Union. The organization took the name at the first meeting.

The conference is still held at midsummer every year at the same location as the first conference. About 15,000 people attend annually. Participants have included author John Ortberg and singer Carola Häggkvist.

== Characteristics and organization ==
One of the characteristics of the Holiness Union was its openness to female preachers. Götabro, which became the Holiness Union's mission school, trained missionaries and evangelists, and of the 1,317 people who graduated in 1955, 658 were women. Even the first class at Götabro included women. The well-known missionary Fredrik Franson, who helped lead to the organization's founding, had no qualms about teaching and sending women, publishing Profeterande döttrar ('Prophesying daughters') and other works on the matter. Nelly Hall, a female preacher, was also on its board for a number of years.

The Holiness Union, which was originally a missionary society, had missions in several countries such as Sweden, China, South Africa, Japan, Swaziland, Germany and France. Missionary work was therefore an important part of the movement's identity, as was music. The Holiness Union had many musicians and composers, such as preacher Emil Gustafson, Eric Bergqvist, Arnold Schyrman, Karl Gustaf Sjölin, Conrad Adolf Björkman and J. Sonesson. Emil Gustafson compiled and published the hymnal Hjärtesånger in 1895.

The Holiness Union's publications were called Trons Segrar, Segrande Ungdom and Barnens Missionstidning, the first of which was founded in 1890 and had about 9,000 subscribers in 1946.

== Notable members ==
Holiness Union member Emil Gustafson's works have been translated into several languages; Holiness member Stig Abrahamsson wrote a 1948 biography on him called Emil Gustafson – en Guds profet ('Emil Gustafson – a prophet of God'). Swedish church historian Joel Halldorf defended his dissertation on Gustafson in 2012. Gustafson's writings have been of great importance to Brunstad Christian Church, the Flodberg Circle and Pentecostal pastor Peter Halldorf.

Gustav Edwards (1874–1948), head of the Swedish Evangelical Free Church's Bible institute in Chicago, was a Holiness Union missionary.

== Leaders ==
- Edvard Hedin (1887–1921)
