= University College Stockholm =

Swedish school for theology and human rights

Coordinates: 59°20′10″N 17°55′36″E

The University College Stockholm (Swedish: Enskilda högskolan Stockholm), formerly the Stockholm School of Theology (Swedish: Teologiska högskolan Stockholm), is an independent school for theology and human rights in Stockholm, Sweden, sponsored by the Uniting Church in Sweden.

The institution has been accredited by the Swedish National Agency for Higher Education to award degrees in the field of theology (Swedish: kandidatexamen i teologi and masterexamen i teologi, Bachelor of Theology and Master of Theology) as well as in the field of human rights (Swedish: kandidatexamen i mänskliga rättigheter). In cooperation with Uppsala University, Stockholm School of Theology also awards a Master's degree in human rights.

The school declares an ecumenical ambition and students include future pastors in the denomination, but also a sizable group training for clerical positions in the Church of Sweden, as well as others.
