= Free Baptist Union =

1872 Swedish Baptist denomination

- Classification: Protestant
- Orientation: Baptist
- Theology: Evangelicalism, historically Christian pacifism, anti-trinitarianism and holiness movement
- Polity: Congregational
- Origin: 1872
- Merged into: Holiness Union/Free Baptist Union
- Defunct: 1 January 1994
- Congregations: 31 (1992)
- Members: 1051 (1992)
- Publications: Upplysningens Vän

The Free Baptist Union (Swedish: Fribaptistsamfundet) was a Swedish Baptist Christian denomination that began in 1872, when Baptist preacher Helge Åkeson was expelled from the Baptist Union of Sweden, after having been accused of heresy.

The Free Baptist Union gained followers mainly in Scania, Gotland, Dalarna, Västmanland and Västergötland. In the early 1900s, the denomination peaked at around 5000 members.

In 1994, the Free Baptist Union merged with the Holiness Union, forming a denomination that in 1997 merged with the Örebro Mission to form what is today the Evangelical Free Church in Sweden.
