= United Evangelical Church in Puerto Rico =

Founded on January 28, 1931 in Fajardo, Puerto Rico

The United Evangelical Church in Puerto Rico (Spanish: Iglesia Evangelica Unida de Puerto Rico) is a Reformed and congregational Christian denomination in Puerto Rico.

== Overview ==
The church was founded on January 28, 1931, in Fajardo as a result of the union of the Congregational Church, the United Brethren Church and the Christian Church.

In January 1990 it became a conference of the United Church of Christ; however in 2006 the Puerto Rican Conference dissolved all relations with the UCC due to differing views on LGBT issues. In 2006 it had 61 congregations and 42 house fellowships.

In 2023 the denomination is part of the Latin American Council of Churches. It is also part of the Evangelical Seminary of Puerto Rico.

The denomination has links to mainland US through its partnership with the First Church in New Hampshire.
