= Uniting Church in Sweden =

Swedish Protestant Christian denomination

- Equmeniakyrkan
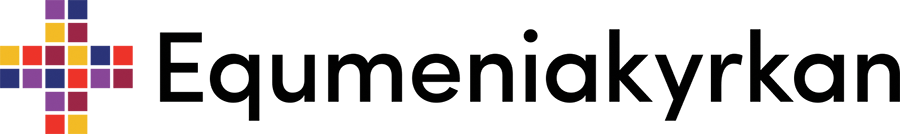
- Classification: United church
- Orientation: Protestantism
- Theology: Pietist, Reformed
- Associations: World Communion of Reformed Churches, Baptist World Alliance, International Federation of Free Evangelical Churches, United Methodist Church, European Baptist Federation, World Methodist Council, World Council of Churches, Conference of European Churches
- Region: Sweden
- Headquarters: Bromma, Sweden
- Origin: 4 June 2011
- Merger of: Baptist Union of Sweden, Mission Covenant Church of Sweden, United Methodist Church of Sweden
- Members: ca. 59,000 (2022)
- Official website: www.equmeniakyrkan.se

Uniting Church in Sweden (Swedish: Equmeniakyrkan) is a united Protestant denomination in Sweden.

== History ==
It was established on 4 June 2011 by the merger of the United Methodist Church, Baptist Union of Sweden, and Mission Covenant Church of Sweden.

Initially the name of the unified denomination was the Joint Future Church (Swedish: Gemensam framtid), before the name was changed during a conference in Karlstad on 11 May 2013 to the present Uniting Church in Sweden or Equmeniakyrkan in Swedish.

== Organization ==
The Uniting Church in Sweden consists of about 640 local congregations in Sweden, which collectively have about 59,000 members. The church serves around 130,000 people as of 2021.

Since 2007, the merging denominations also had a common youth organization called Equmenia. The intention to form the new denomination was made in the respective conferences in 2008, 2009 and 2010 before the final decision was made in 2011.

Since the inaugural meeting in 2011, the denomination's chairperson was Ann-Sofie Lasell, who was succeeded in 2014 by Tomas Bjöersdorff and in 2017 by Susanne Rodmar. The current chairperson, Dick Simonsson, was elected in 2026. The church conference in Linköping in 2012 elected Lasse Svensson as president and Olle Alkholm and Sofia Camnerin as vice presidents. All three were re-elected at the 2016 church conference in Stockholm. At the 2020 church conference, Lasse Svensson was re-elected as president, and Karin Wiborn and Joakim Hagerius were newly elected as vice presidents. In 2026 Karin Wiborn was elected as president and Niklas Pensoho as vice presidents.

The Uniting Church in Sweden runs University College Stockholm (formerly Stockholm School of Theology) and along with Equmenia runs Härnösand Folk High School, Sjövik Folk High School, Karlskoga Folk High School, Bromma Folk High School and Södra Vätterbygdens folkhögskola. Together with the Swedish Alliance Mission, it runs the aid organization Diakonia. The Uniting Church in Sweden is a member organization of the study association Bilda. Along with a number of other Christian denominations and organizations, it runs the nonprofit social work organization Hela människan. The Uniting Church in Sweden is a member of a number of international organizations, among them the World Council of Churches.

The church has an extensive international cooperation with sister churches in many countries.

== Ecumenism ==
The ecumenical agreements that previously existed between the Church of Sweden, the Mission Covenant Church of Sweden and the United Methodist Church of Sweden have since 2016 been adapted to a similar agreement between the Church of Sweden and the Uniting Church in Sweden.
