= United Methodist Church in Sweden =

United Methodist Church of Sweden
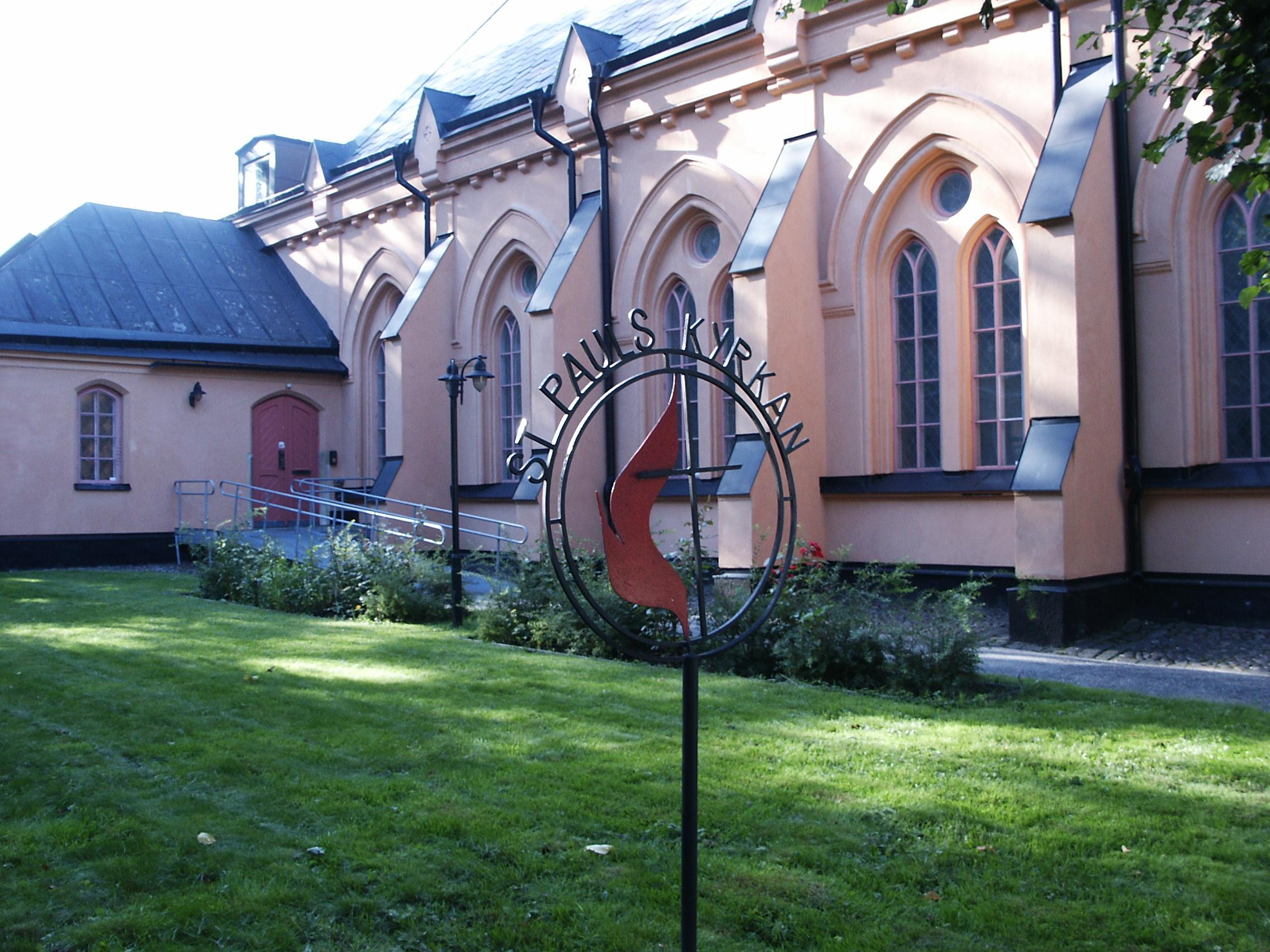
- Saint Paul's Church, methodist church in Södermalm in Stockholm
- Classification: Protestant
- Orientation: Protestantism
- Theology: Methodism
- Region: Sweden
- Origin: 1868
- Merged into: Uniting Church in Sweden
- Members: 6,436 (2009)
- Publications: Svenska sändebudet

The United Methodist Church in Sweden (Swedish: Metodistkyrkan i Sverige) was a Protestant Christian denomination that existed in Sweden between 1868 and 2012. The church participated in creating the Uniting Church in Sweden. According to a 2009 report, the denomination had 6,436 members

== See also ==
- United Methodist Church in Norway
