= Örebro Mission =

Christian denomination in Örebro, Sweden

- Classification: Protestant
- Orientation: Baptist
- Headquarters: Örebro, Sweden
- Origin: 1892
- Merged into: Evangelical Free Church in Sweden
- Defunct: 1 January 1997

The Örebro Mission (Swedish: Örebromissionen) was a Protestant denomination in Sweden. It was founded in Örebro in 1892 by Baptist pastor John Ongman and was part of the Baptist Union of Sweden until 1936. In 1997, the denomination became part of the Evangelical Free Church in Sweden.
