= Swedish Alliance Mission =

Swedish Christian denomination

- Svenska Alliansmissionen
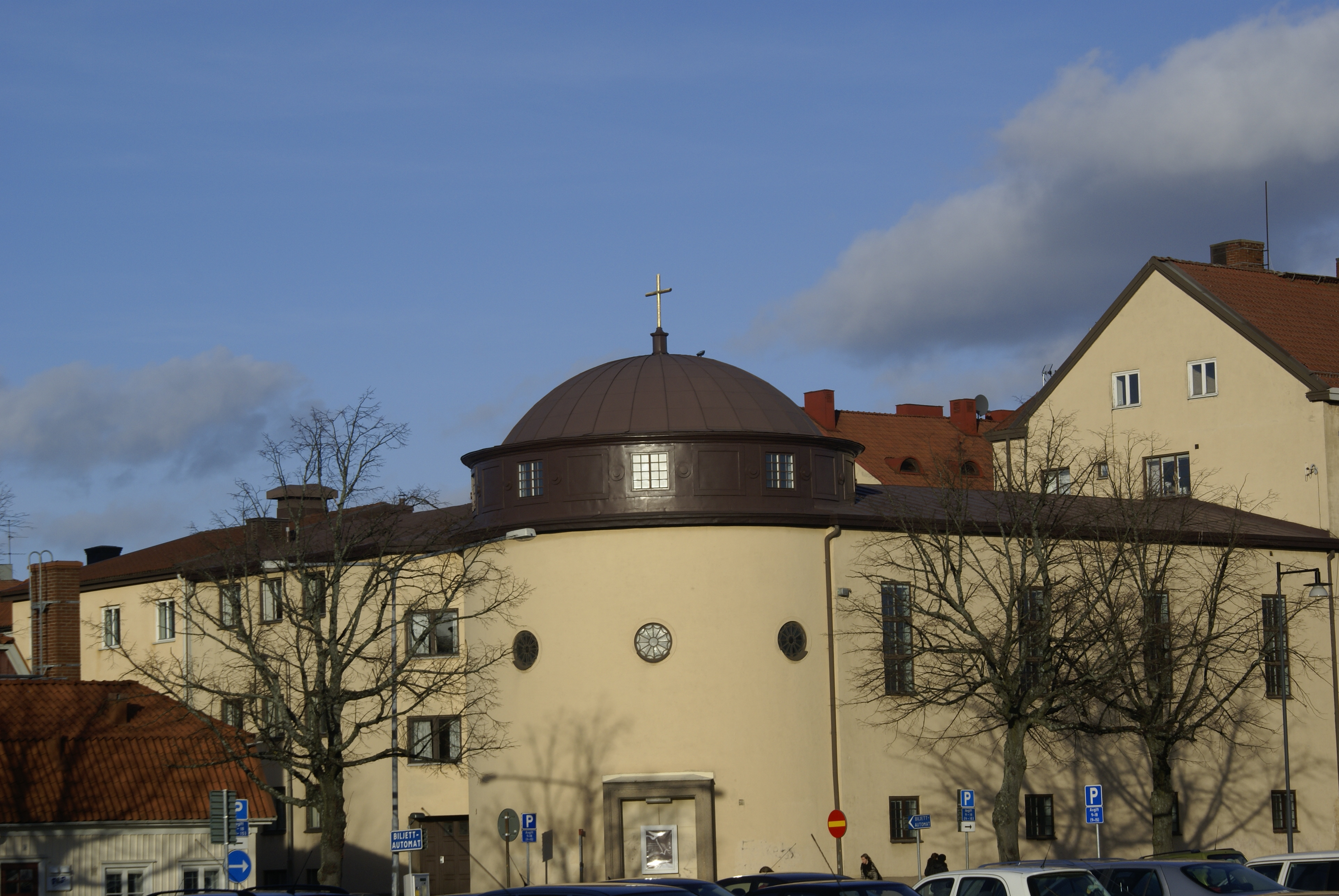
- Alliance Church in Jönköping
- Classification: Protestant
- Orientation: Protestantism
- Region: international
- Language: Swedish
- Headquarters: Jönköping, Sweden
- Origin: 1919
- Merger of: Jönköping Mission Society, Jönköpingskretsens kristliga ungdomsförbund, Skandinaviska Alliansmissionen i Sverige
- Members: 13,777 (2020)

The Swedish Alliance Mission, SAM, (Swedish: Svenska alliansmissionen) is a Christian denomination in Sweden, mainly based in the town of Jönköping. Its roots are in the 19th-century nyevangelism revival.

As of 2020, the denomination had 13,777 members spread among 153 Swedish congregations and congregations outside Sweden.

The denomination was established in 1919 as a merger of Jönköping Mission Society, the Jönköping District Christian Youth Association and the Scandinavian Alliance Mission in Sweden.

== History ==
The Swedish Alliance Mission has its roots in the nyevangelism revival of the 19th century, mainly in Jönköping and neighboring counties. One of its leading figures was Per Magnus Elmblad, who in 1836 became the priest of Kristine Church in Jönköping. There he invited people to read the Bible, and an "awakened" group was formed. Elmblad was soon transferred due to protests and was later active in the Swedish Evangelical Mission (Evangeliska Fosterlandsstiftelsen, EFS).

The group in Jönköping continued to meet in homes, despite the Conventicle Act, which forbade religious gatherings without the participation of a priest. In 1853 the Jönköping Tract Society was founded with lecturer Knut Wilhelm Almqvist as chairman, with the aim of spreading evangelical tracts. The organization was influenced by preacher Carl Olof Rosenius' teachings. First Carl-Johan Lindberg and later Svenning Johansson were hired as colporteurs. After three years, Thor Hartwig Odencrants became the society's chairman, a position he held for 30 years until 1886. In 1861, with Odencrants still at the helm, this society was reorganized as the Jönköping Mission Society, whose activity mainly focused on sending lay preachers to various auxiliary associations. In addition, the association mediated funds collected, including from sewing associations, which were mainly distributed to international projects run by the Swedish Evangelical Mission and the Swedish Mission Covenant. In rural areas, local auxiliary associations were gradually formed, which received traveling preachers from the Jönköping Association and collected funds for the missionary activities recommended by the Jönköping Mission Society. A common way of raising money for the mission was for the local sewing association to organize mission auctions, where the women's handicrafts were sold; these were usually held in the spring.

In 1860, Jönköping's first mission building was built, with room for about 1000 people. It was mainly used for the association's four quarterly meetings, which were held in connection with Jönköping's market days in January, March, May and October. These gatherings attracted many visitors from an area tens of kilometers away from the city, so the mission building soon felt too small. Thus, in 1876, a larger building was constructed at Odengatan/Målargatan på Öster in Jönköping, with room for about 3000 people.

The number of traveling preachers gradually increased and they traveled to an increasingly large area, including Västergötland and Östergötland in addition to Småland. In 1886, pastor Karl Palmberg became chairman of the Jönköping Mission Society. Palmberg, a priest in Månsarp parish, was a recognized public speaker and gathered large audiences. Gradually, more and more mission buildings were built by the local assistant associations, to be used for meetings when the traveling preacher came to visit, but also for auctions. Palmberg was a popular speaker at the inauguration of local mission buildings.

In these buildings, local missionary associations were formed, sometimes the first association in the town, with a board, treasury and minutes. Some missionary societies joined the Jönköping Mission Society as auxiliary organizations, others joined the Swedish Mission Covenant; still others joined both. Initially, these associations had no employed preachers, but as finances allowed, circuit preachers or local preachers were employed in larger places, with the number of traveling preachers gradually decreasing.

In 1855, a Christian youth association was formed in Jönköping, which organized Bible studies, choirs and a variety of events. Members would, for example, visit elderly people every week to distribute and read newspapers, taking the previous week's issue to be distributed at the next location. Similar associations were gradually formed in other places within the Mission Society's area of operation. In 1892, the Jönköpingskretsens Ynglingaförbund ('Jönköping District Youth Association') was formed by 18 local youth associations, whose main task was to send a missionary to China under their own auspices. Similarly, the girls formed young women's associations, which also cooperated in a joint association. The boys' and girls' associations gradually merged and were then called youth associations. In 1907, Jönköpingskretsens Ungdomsförbund ('Jönköping District Youth Association') was formed, bringing together both boys and girls, an organization that from 1919 was called the Swedish Alliance Mission Youth Association (Svenska Alliansmissionens Ungdomsförbund, SAU).

Swedish-American Fredrik Franson, a well-known world evangelist, visited Sweden several times. Through an American organization (the Scandinavian Alliance Mission), he undertook the task of recruiting 200 missionaries, mainly to China. He searched primarily among Swedish immigrants in America, but he also visited Europe and Sweden to inspire missionary activity and recruit missionaries. Through short courses, Franson attracted several young Swedes to become missionaries. To provide support for these missionaries, an association was formed in 1900 in Jönköping (the Scandiavian Alliance Mission in Sweden), with links to the Jönköping Mission Society and the Jönköping District Youth Association. The number of missionaries supported by this association increased and the commitment to missionary work, mainly in China, India and Southern Africa, grew rapidly. The chairman of the Scandinavian Alliance Mission was vicar Sven Emil Hagberg in Sandseryd.

In 1919, the Swedish Alliance Mission was formed through the merger of the Jönköping Mission Society, Scandinavian Alliance Mission in Sweden and the Youth Association. This was a natural step, as the three organizations had their roots in the same new evangelical revival and mainly involved the same people.

The Swedish Alliance Mission subsequently evolved from an intra-church mission organization to a free church denomination. The legacy of the revival lives on through evangelism and mission. It has done extensive youth work, which has been a distinctive feature of the movement.

== Theology ==
The Swedish Alliance Mission's theology is linked to its historical heritage. In particular, the Swedish Alliance Mission has roots from the Lutheran state church (Church of Sweden) as an intra-church missionary association, which is reflected in the Alliance Mission's practice of infant baptism.

The early roots of the Alliance Mission, like much of the rest of the revivalist movement, used a form of civil disobedience to the Conventicle Act (1726–1858), i.e. the ban on gathering as a religious group without a priest present.

A theological belief that characterized the roots of the Swedish Alliance Mission, as well as other parts of the revival movement, was the Pietist emphasis on personal conversion and sanctification. Preaching played a central role as people gathered in homes and mission houses.

The Swedish Alliance Mission has held to the Anselmian doctrine of the atonement and has generally had a more conservative biblical view.

The Swedish Alliance Mission was influenced by other parts of the revivalist movement in Sweden, perhaps mainly after it developed from an intra-church missionary association to a free church denomination. The influence of Baptist baptismal practice (believer's baptism) is certainly present in the Swedish Alliance Mission; it follows the so-called "double baptismal practice" though its roots are clearly anchored in a Lutheran theological view.

The ecumenical movement has meant that SAM today mainly cooperates with other free church denominations such as the Evangelical Free Church in Sweden and the Pentecostal movement (the Pentecostal Alliance of Independent Churches).

The most obvious example of collaboration and the influence of the ecumenical movement, of which the Alliance Mission is a part, is the joint theology and leadership training program Academy for Leadership and Theology (ALT), run together with the Pentecostal Alliance of Independent Churches and the Evangelical Free Church in Sweden.

== See also ==
- Läsare
