= Evangelical Free Church in Sweden =

Baptist denomination in Sweden

- Evangeliska Frikyrkan
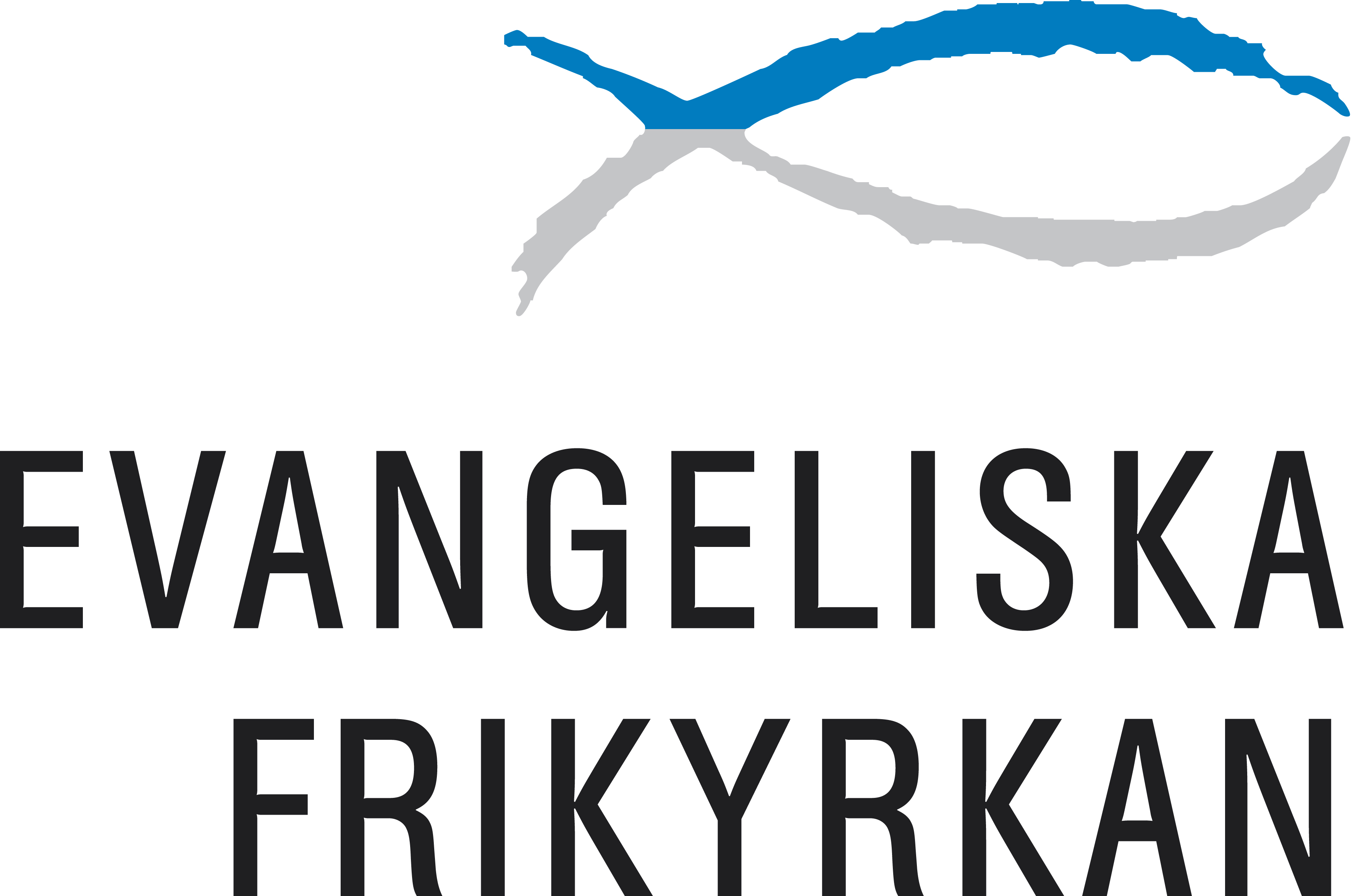
- Classification: Evangelical Christianity
- Scripture: Bible
- Theology: Baptist
- Associations: European Baptist Federation; Baptist World Alliance
- Region: Sweden
- Headquarters: Örebro
- Origin: 1 January 1997
- Branched from: Mission Friends
- Congregations: 300
- Members: 32,500
- Official website: efk.se

The Evangelical Free Church in Sweden (Swedish: Evangeliska frikyrkan) is a Baptist Christian denomination in Sweden. It is affiliated with the European Baptist Federation and the Baptist World Alliance. The headquarters is in Örebro.

== History ==
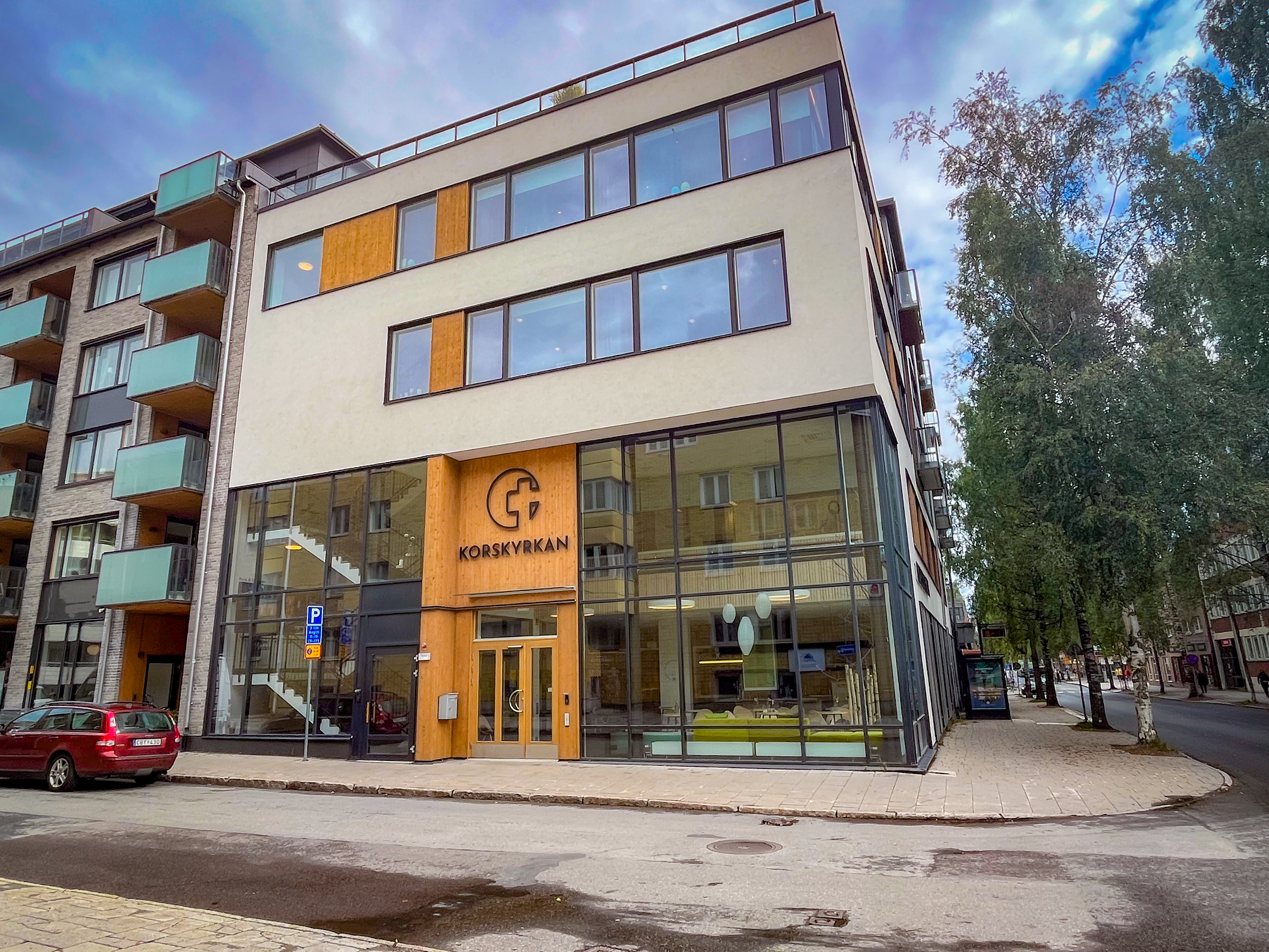
Umeå Cross Church.

Evangeliska Frikyrkan was founded in 1997 as a merger of the Örebro Mission (Örebromissionen, founded in 1892 as Örebro Missionary Society), the Free Baptist Union (Fribaptistsamfundet, founded in 1872) and the Holiness Union (Helgelseförbundet, founded in 1887).

In 2011, it had 32,223 members.

As of 2015, it has 304 churches and 34,400 members.

According to a census published by the association in 2023, it claimed 32,500 members and 300 churches.

== School ==
Together with the Swedish Alliance Mission and the Pentecostal Alliance of Independent Churches, the church operates the Academy for Leadership and Theology (ALT).
