= Hedberg =

Hedberg is a Swedish surname. Notable people with the surname include:

- Anders Hedberg (born 1951), Swedish ice hockey player
- Frans Hedberg (1828–1908), Swedish playwright and poet
- Fredrik Gabriel Hedberg (1811–1893), Finnish Lutheran priest
- Hans Hedberg (1917–2007), Swedish sculptor
- Hollis Dow Hedberg (1903–1988) American geologist specialising in petroleum exploration
- Inga Hedberg (1927–2024), Swedish botanist and academic
- Ingemar Hedberg (1920–2019), Swedish sprint canoer
- Johan Erik Hedberg, (1767–1823) Finnish painter
- Johan Hedberg (born 1973), Swedish ice hockey goaltender
- John Hedberg (1840–1916) Finnish forester, journalist and politician
- Joshua Hedberg (born 2007), American diver
- Karl Olov Hedberg (1923–2007), Swedish botanist
- Lara Hedberg Deam (born 1967), American Magazine publisher and founder of architecture and design magazine Dwell
- Mitch Hedberg (1968–2005), American stand-up comedian
- Dr. Nicholas J Hedberg, OD (born 1984-), American Optometrist
- Olle Hedberg (1899–1974), Swedish author
- Peter Hedberg (born 1990), Swedish politician
- Randy Hedberg (born 1954), American college football coach and a former professional football player
- Reinhold Hedberg (1862–1922), Finnish Lutheran clergyman and politician
- Rolf Hedberg (born 1973), Swedish bandy player
- Sami Hedberg (born 1981), Finnish stand up comedian and actor
- Stina Hedberg (1887–1981), Swedish actress
- Trevor Hedberg (1886–1954), British sailor and Olympic Champion

== See also ==
- 20282 Hedberg, main-belt asteroid
- Hedberg Maps, map publishing company based in Minneapolis, Minnesota
