= Johannes Palmqvist =

Swedish Baptist leader (1805–1894)

Johannes Palmquist
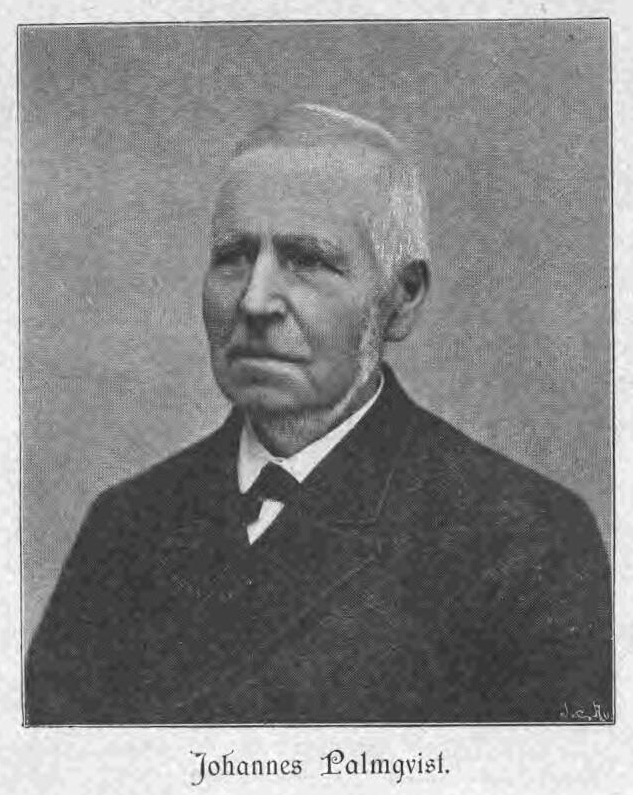
- Born: 1805; Norra Solberga, Småland, Sweden
- Died: 1894 (aged 88–89)
- Occupation(s): Musician, teacher, Baptist pastor
- Spouse: Anna Stina Lindberg (m. 1852)
- Relatives: 6 siblings, including: Gustaf Palmquist; Per Palmqvist

Johannes Palmqvist (1805–1894) was a pioneer Swedish Baptist pastor, along with his younger brothers Gustaf Palmquist and Per Palmqvist. He was known as the father of the läsare (Reader) movement in Närke province, Sweden.

== Biography ==
Palmqvist was born in Pilabo, Norra Solberga parish, Jönköping County, in 1805 to Sven Larsson, a churchwarden, and Helena Nilsdotter. He had six siblings. Their father died when Palmqvist was a young teenager, leaving his mother to raise the family. She was described as "pious and zealous". The children were raised in a Pietist environment and visited influential revivalist preachers such as Pehr Nyman, Peter Lorenz Sellergren, and Jacob Otto Hoof.

Like his brothers, Palmqvist was also quite musical. He studied in Stockholm to become an organist and teacher; while there he met the influential Scottish Wesleyan Methodist preacher George Scott, who lived and preached in Sweden from 1830–1842. Initially Lutheran, Palmqvist became a cantor in Stockholm in 1832 and in 1834 moved to Stora Mellösa, where he would live for several decades. He first worked in the local parish as a musical director (klockare), responsible for music during the services and bell-ringing as well as doing diaconal work. Palmqvist was also a folk school teacher there.

Since the Conventicle Act prohibited religious gatherings outside of those of the Church of Sweden, Palmqvist began to hold temperance meetings at which he preached, causing controversy and forcing him to leave his teaching job in 1850. He did, however, remain a music director for eight more years. In 1852 he married Anna Stina Lindberg. Several years after his younger brothers, in 1858, he became a Baptist and was baptized. He built a school and chapel the same year and founded a Baptist church in Vallby the year after, which quickly grew to 250 members. Palmqvist soon became a key figure in the revivalist läsare (Reader) movement in the province of Närke and an early temperance activist. He served as the Baptist's church pastor until 1871, when he moved to Stockholm and became lay preacher at a Baptist church there.

Palmqvist died in 1894.
