= Anders Wiberg =

Swedish preacher and writer (1816–1887)

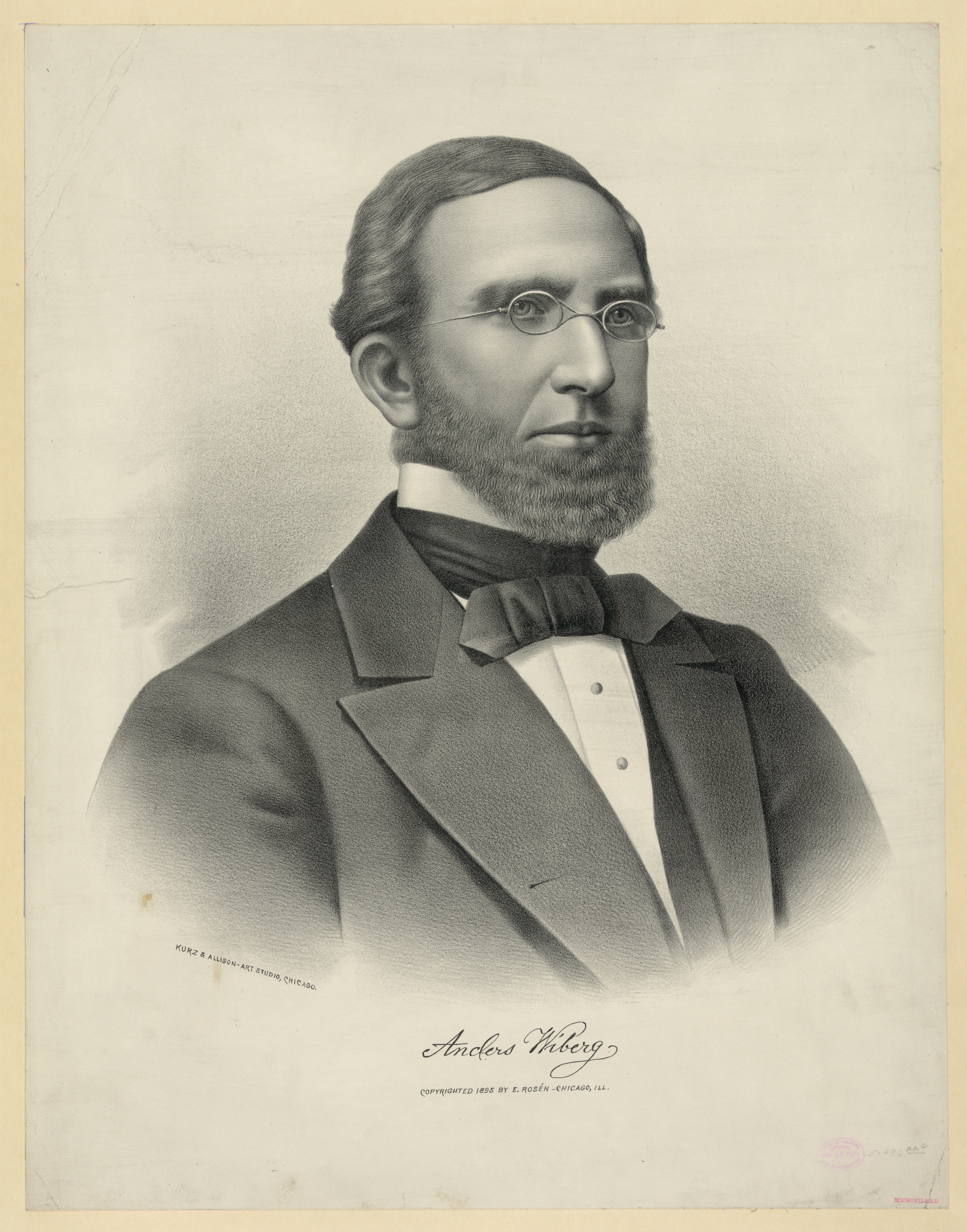
- Anders Wiberg c. 18 November 1895. Credit: E. Rosén
- Born: 17 July 1816; Vi, Hälsingland, Sweden
- Died: 5 November 1887 (aged 71); Stockholm, Sweden
- Occupations: Preacher, missionary
- Movement: Baptist Church

Anders Wiberg (17 July 1816 – 5 November 1887) was a preacher, missionary, and leader of the early Swedish Baptist movement.

== Life ==
=== Early life and influences ===
Wiberg was born on 17 July 1816 in Vi in Hälsingtuna parish, Hälsingland, Sweden. He was educated at Uppsala University and became a priest in the Church of Sweden. The growing pietist and Reader (läsare) movements in the Scandinavian countries were an influence on him. Wiberg, like fellow Lutheran-turned-Baptist-pioneer Gustaf Palmquist, was a friend of pietist preacher Carl Olof Rosenius. He was also influenced by Methodist missionary George Scott and Lars Vilhelm Henschen, a champion of religious freedom. Wiberg later came to know several of the figures in the growing Baptist revival movement and his views on the state church became more skeptical. Wiberg has been called the "pivotal link to the New World" and "in some ways a piece of ideological blotting paper" due to his connections with so many key figures in the Reader movement. After a visit to preacher Johann Gerhard Oncken in Hamburg in 1851, Wiberg came to agree with Baptist teachings regarding baptism.

=== Wiberg's influence ===
He developed his teachings on baptism in the book Vilken bör döpas och varuti består dopet? ('Who should be baptized and what does baptism consist of?') in 1852, which sparked a fierce debate in which Lars Anton Anjou, Lars Landgren and Fredrik Gabriel Hedberg made high-profile contributions. The same year, on his journey to the United States, he was baptized by F. O. Nilsson in Copenhagen.

Wiberg spent three years in the United States to learn more about the Baptist movement there. He was ordained in New York in the Baptist Mariner's Church and then worked for the American Baptist Publication Society. While in Philadelphia, he married Caroline Lintemuth. He also wrote Det kristliga dopet ('The Christian baptism') and Är du döpt? ('Are you baptized?'), the first Swedish Baptist publications in the United States. Wiberg returned to Sweden in 1855 to find that his writings had contributed to the movement's growth; there were now 500 Swedish Baptists, with 800 to 1000 formal conversions a year. He became the leader of the first Baptist church in Stockholm, founded the year before. He began intensive work to strengthen the new movement throughout the country. Among his collaborators were brothers Johannes, Per, and Gustaf Palmquist. A confession of faith written by Wiberg was adopted, a training course for preachers was begun, and from 1856 the new movement had its own publication, Evangelisten, edited by Wiberg. The publication and Wiberg's colporteur work played a large role in the spread of Baptist churches in Norway and Finland as well; his writings were brought to Åland and contributed to the start of the early Finnish Baptist movement. He also baptized some of the early founders of Baptist churches in Finland, siblings Viktor and Anna Heikel.

In 1858, the Conventicle Act, which outlawed religious meetings other than those of the Lutheran Church of Sweden, was overturned. By the following year, the Baptists had grown to a total of 4,311 members in 95 churches, and almost 6,000 members in 1863.

=== Baptist Union and seminary ===
Wiberg was one of the leaders who worked to gather the Swedish Baptist churches for their first general conference in 1857; this was to become the Baptist Union of Sweden in 1889. Speakers at the second conference included key Baptist figures Julius Köbner, John Howard Hinton, and Edward Steane. In 1866, the conference established a seminary, Bethel Seminary (Betelseminariet), which Wiberg raised funds for through the American Baptist Missionary Union.

=== Death ===
Wiberg died on 5 November 1887 in Stockholm.

== Works ==
- Hvilken bör döpas och hvari består dopet? (1852, Uppsala)
- Det kristliga dopet (1854, Philadelphia)
- Den heliga skrifts lära om det christliga dopet (1855, Philadelphia) (also printed in Stockholm)
- Läran om helgelsen (1869)
- De kristnas enhet (1879)
- Svar på lektor Waldenströms skrift: Barndopets historia (1880)

== See also ==
- Radical Pietism
- Oscar Broady – contemporaneous Swedish Baptist missionary
- John Alexis Edgren – contemporaneous Swedish Baptist missionary
