= Per Palmqvist =

Swedish Baptist pioneer (1815–1887)

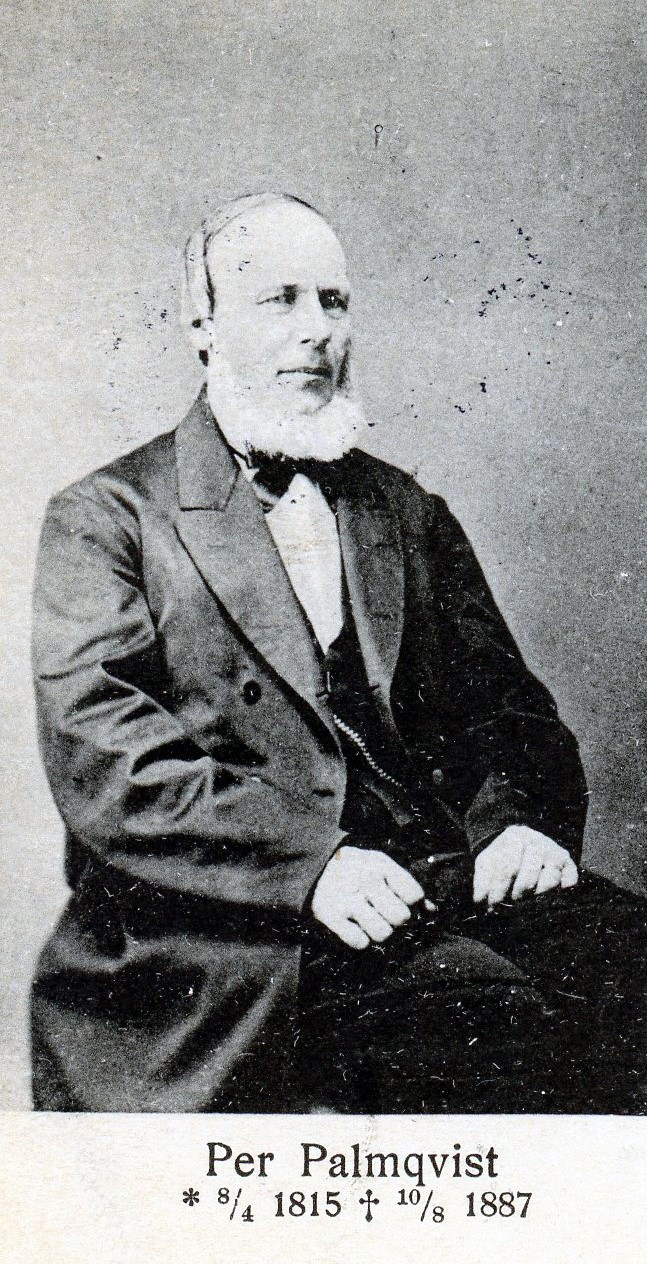
- Born: 8 April 1815; Norra Solberga Parish, Jönköping County, Sweden
- Died: 10 August 1887 (aged 72); Ringarums parish, Östergötland County, Sweden
- Other names: Per Palmquist
- Occupation(s): Swedish Baptist pioneer, Sunday school founder, church musician
- Spouses: Betty Augusta Mahncke (m. 1849; died 1862) Juliana Laurentia Charlotta Möller (m. 1863; died 1874) Amanda Christina Charlotta Melin (m. 1874)
- Relatives: 6 siblings, including: Gustaf Palmquist; Johannes Palmqvist

Per Palmqvist, also Palmquist, (8 April 1815 – 10 August 1887) was a Swedish Baptist pioneer and organist. He is regarded as one of the founders of Sunday school in Sweden. Palmqvist, along with his two brothers Johannes and Gustaf Palmquist, were early leaders of the Swedish Baptist movement in Sweden.

== Biography ==
Per Palmqvist was born 8 April 1815 in Norra Solberga parish, Jönköping County, the son of churchwarden Sven Larsson and Helena Nilsdotter. There were seven children in the family; their father died when Palmqvist was very young, leaving their mother to raise the family. She was described as "pious and zealous". Their home was of a Pietistic religious nature and the family visited influential revivalist preachers such as Pehr Nyman, Peter Lorenz Sellergren, and Jacob Otto Hoof.

Like his brothers Johannes and Gustaf, Palmqvist would become a church chorister and teacher. As a young man, he became a student at the Royal Swedish Academy of Music in Stockholm in the spring semester of 1838. He received his organist and church chorister degrees on 14 June 1838. Palmqvist worked as a teacher, including at Prince Charles' institution for orphans. The three brothers got to know leaders in the Swedish Nyevangelism ('New Evangelism') movement, including Scottish Methodist missionary George Scott and Carl Olof Rosenius and were greatly influenced by their teachings as well as by Finnish Lutheran priest Fredrik Gabriel Hedberg.

In 1851, the brothers traveled to London to learn about Sunday school, which had existed in England for some time but was still a new phenomenon in Sweden. Fellow Swedish Sunday school pioneer Betty Ehrenborg, who had also been involved in the same Nyevangelism movement, also went at or around the same time, if not together with them. There they reconnected with Scott, who had been forced to leave Sweden, and learned about the Methodists' Sunday school and their educational methods. The program had over 250 children and 20 to 30 teachers; classes were taught by laypeople and included literacy training in addition to Bible lessons, singing, and prayer. The program made a strong impact on them. Per and Johannes then returned home, while Gustaf continued on to the United States. Later that year, Palmqvist founded the first Sunday school within the Baptist movement in Sweden, inviting 25 local poor children. Ehrenborg also began what would be one of the first Lutheran Sunday schools the same year. Palmqvist was given £5 in financial support by the London Sunday School Association and used the money to travel to Norrland, home of a significant revival movement, to spread the idea of Sunday school there. The Baptist Sunday school he initially established later moved to Betelkapellet in 1865. Palmqvist continued to lead Sunday school until 1878. His work was successful: by 1915 there were over 1200 Baptist Sunday schools in the country with over 62,000 students.

He first married Betty Augusta Mahncke (1824–1862) on 19 December 1849 in Maria Magdalena parish, Stockholm. She was the daughter of Sub-Lieutenant August Georg Mahncke and Betty Nobel. The next year he became a book publisher. He founded the Swedish branch of the Evangelical Alliance in 1853. From 1855, Palmqvist was a partner in the Elde & Co. book printing company. He and his brother Gustaf published the hymnbooks Pilgrimssånger and Nya Pilgrimssånger. Palmqvist helped found Stockholms Missionsförening in 1856 to further the church's colportage work. He published early Swedish Baptist preacher Anders Wiberg's work Det kristliga dopet ('the Christian Baptism'). He also published songs, sermons (including a translation of Charles Spurgeon), and tracts, including ones by fellow Sunday School pioneer Mathilda Foy. One of his most significant publications was Swedish missionary Peter Fjellstedt's Biblia, det är all den Heliga skrift, med förklaringar. His publication work was supported by the American Bible Society and the British and Foreign Bible Society.

In 1857, Palmqvist was baptized. The following year, the Conventicle Act, which outlawed religious meetings other than those of the Lutheran Church of Sweden, was overturned, having a large impact on the country's growing free churches.

After his first wife's death in 1862, Palmqvist married a second time on 3 November 1863 in Nacka to Juliana Laurentia Charlotta Möller (1836–1874). She was the daughter of journalist Andreas Möller and Margareta Gustava Sturk.

Even with the increase in religious freedom after the abolition of the Conventicle Act, there were still difficulties. Palmqvist was reported to the Stockholm City Court by a priest in 1870 for teaching children who did not belong to his congregation but was later acquitted.

Palmqvist married for the third time on 29 September 1874 in Ringarum parish to Amanda Christina Charlotta Melin (1843–1896). She was the daughter of Nils Melin, a sea captain and farmer, and Catharina Ulrika Engellau. His children included Gustaf (1859), Betty Augusta (1861), Per Gabriel (1865), Maria Helena Gustafva (1870), and Carl Hugo Natanael (1871). Sons Gustaf and later Per Gabriel would take over the operation of the printing company, which was sold in 1917 to P. A. Norstedt & Söner.

Palmqvist died on 10 August 1887 in Ringarums parish, Östergötland County.

== See also ==
- Baptist Union of Sweden
