= Gustaf Palmquist =

Swedish Baptist pastor (1812–1867)

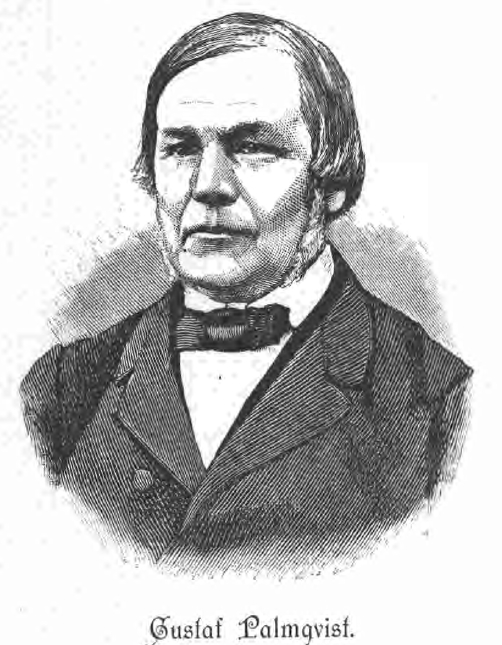
- Born: 26 May 1812; Norra Solberga, Småland, Sweden
- Died: 18 September 1867 (aged 55); Stockholm, Sweden
- Other names: Gustaf Palmqvist
- Occupation: Baptist pastor
- Relatives: 6 siblings, including: Per Palmqvist; Johannes Palmqvist

Gustaf Palmquist, also Palmqvist, (26 May 1812 – 18 September 1867) was a pioneer Swedish Baptist pastor and missionary in Sweden and the United States. He was one of three brothers, including Johannes and Per Palmqvist who were active early in the Baptist movement in Sweden.

== Life ==
Palmquist was born on the farm Pilabo in Norra Solberga parish, Småland, Sweden, on 26 May 1812 to Sven Larsson, a kyrkvärd, similar to a churchwarden, and Helena Nilsdotter. His father died when Palmquist was six years old, leaving his mother to raise seven children. She was described as "pious and zealous". The children were raised in a Pietist environment and visited influential revivalist preachers such as Pehr Nyman, Peter Lorenz Sellergren, and Jacob Otto Hoof.

In 1837, he attended a music academy and normal school. He later worked as a teacher in several cities until 1851. Palmquist was initially a Lutheran lay preacher. As a Lutheran, he came into contact with the pietist movement, emphasizing individual piety, doctrine, and Christian living. He became friends with Swedish pietist preacher Carl Olof Rosenius (he was described as "one of Rosenius' most devoted followers") and Finnish Lutheran Fredrik Gabriel Hedberg. Palmquist also learned about the new and growing Baptist movement from pioneer Swedish Baptist pastor Anders Wiberg as well as Fredrik Olaus (F. O.) Nilsson, who founded the country's first free church in 1848, a Baptist congregation, and was eventually sentenced to exile by the authorities.

In 1851, Palmquist and his brothers traveled to London. There they learned from Methodist preacher George Scott about Sunday school, which was common at the time in England but did not exist in Sweden. He continued on to the United States to work as a teacher while his brothers returned home. His brother Per Palmqvist founded the first Baptist Sunday school in Sweden that year.

Palmquist joined a Swedish Lutheran church in Galesburg, Illinois, in 1851 that had been founded by Lars Paul Esbjörn. At Esbjörn's request, Palmquist served briefly as its priest, "but being a Baptist at heart, although not a confessed one, his work was not calculated to strengthen, but rather to disrupt and weaken the church, whose members were already wavering between the Methodist and the Congregational faith." In 1852, he officially became a Baptist and was baptized. Palmquist then founded the first Swedish Baptist church in the country in Rock Island, Illinois.

At one point he was a missionary in Swede Bend, Iowa, whose views on believers' baptism drew converts from the local Lutheran church – the preacher nearly included – upsetting some in the community.

The churches founded by Baptist pioneers like Palmquist, Nilsson (who had emigrated to the United States while exiled), and Wiberg held their first gathering in September 1858 at a church founded by Nilsson in Scandia, Minnesota. These meetings led in 1879 to the formation of the Swedish Baptist General Conference of America (which changed its name to the Baptist General Conference in 1945 and Converge in 2015).

In 1857 he returned to Sweden to find the Baptist community there growing despite persecution. Dissenters were not allowed to marry outside of the state church; their children were considered illegitimate and in some cases were forcibly baptized by the state church. At that time, the country had 200 church members comprising eight Baptist churches. Palmquist faced legal troubles after performing a wedding and also found that one of his meetings was planned to be disrupted by wild youths, instigated by local priests. In 1858, the Conventicle Act, which outlawed religious meetings other than those of the Lutheran Church of Sweden, was overturned. By the following year, the Baptists had grown to a total of 4,311 members in 95 churches.

A seminary for the growing Baptist community, Bethel Seminary (Betelseminariet), was founded in 1866 in Stockholm. Palmquist worked as a teacher there and at the institute founded by Wiberg in Örebro. He was also a hymnwriter, publishing a hymnal called Pilgrimssånger in 1859.

At the end of his life, Palmquist was pastor of a church in Stockholm when he became ill and died a few days later, on 18 September 1867.

Palmquist's work made its mark on the religious environment of both Sweden and the United States: by 1871, the American Swedish Baptist churches had over 1500 members in seven states, and by 1902, 22,000 members in 324 churches. In Sweden, the total reached 31,000 Baptists by 1930.

== Hymns ==
- "Helge Ande ljuva, du som likt en duva" translated from German by Johan Rothof in 1720, and published in Mose och lambsens wisor, later adapted by Palmquist in 1862.
- "Kom, låt oss nu förenas här" ('Come, let us join our cheerful songs'), 1862 translation of Isaac Watts' text (1707) from English

== See also ==
- American Baptist Home Mission Society
- Baptist Union of Sweden
- Radical Pietism
- John Alexis Edgren – contemporaneous Swedish Baptist missionary
- Oscar Broady – contemporaneous Swedish Baptist missionary
