= Olof Palmgren =

Swedish pietist leader (1783–1814)

- Born: 18 June 1783; Överluleå socken, Sweden
- Died: 14 July 1814 (aged 31); Nätra socken, Sweden
- Occupations: Preacher, farmer
- Known for: Läsare movement, the Palmgren awakening
- Spouse: Brita Stina Pehrsdotter (m. 1803)

Olof Palmgren (18 July 1783 – 14 July 1814) was a Swedish farmer and one of the leaders of the Christian läsare (Reader) movement starting around 1810, of which his sect was known as the "Palmgren awakening".

== Biography ==
Palmgren was born in Överluleå socken, Sweden, in 1783, to farmer Olof Persson. He took over his father's farm in Svartbyn at the age of seventeen. In 1803, he married Brita Stina Pehrsdotter.

The Pietist New Reader movement came to Piteå around 1810 through one of Palmgren's relatives, who had read Herrnhuter (Moravian Church) David Hollatz' work. Under the influence of Martin Luther's writings and the movement, Palmgren underwent a conversion or "awakening", after which he began preaching in his home village as well as in other villages. His preaching came to Harads and Svartlå by 1811.

Accused by the vicar of the parish of violating the Conventicle Act, banning all preaching and services outside the Church of Sweden, he was questioned in 1812 both by the diocesan chapter and before the district court, which sentenced him to a fine for unlawful gatherings and having spoken slanderously about the clergy.

After private instruction in his hometown and from 1813 in Stockholm, Palmgren became a student in Uppsala in 1814 and enrolled at the seminary there led by Samuel Ödmann. Palmgren had planned to be ordained in the state church. Palmgren seems to have gained Ödmann's confidence and was allowed to preach several times in the cathedral. Palmgren's preaching represented a return to Luther and a critique of the moralism of the time – he emphasized grace and faith over works. In the last years of his life, under the influence of Ödmann, he seems to have moved closer to ecclesiastical preaching. In 1813 he published a new edition of Luther's Commentary on Galatians.

After falling ill with tuberculosis, Palmgren was forced to interrupt his studies to return home, but died on the journey in 1814 in Nätra socken, Sweden.

== See also ==
- Radical Pietism
