= George Scott (missionary) =

Scottish Methodist missionary (1804–1874)

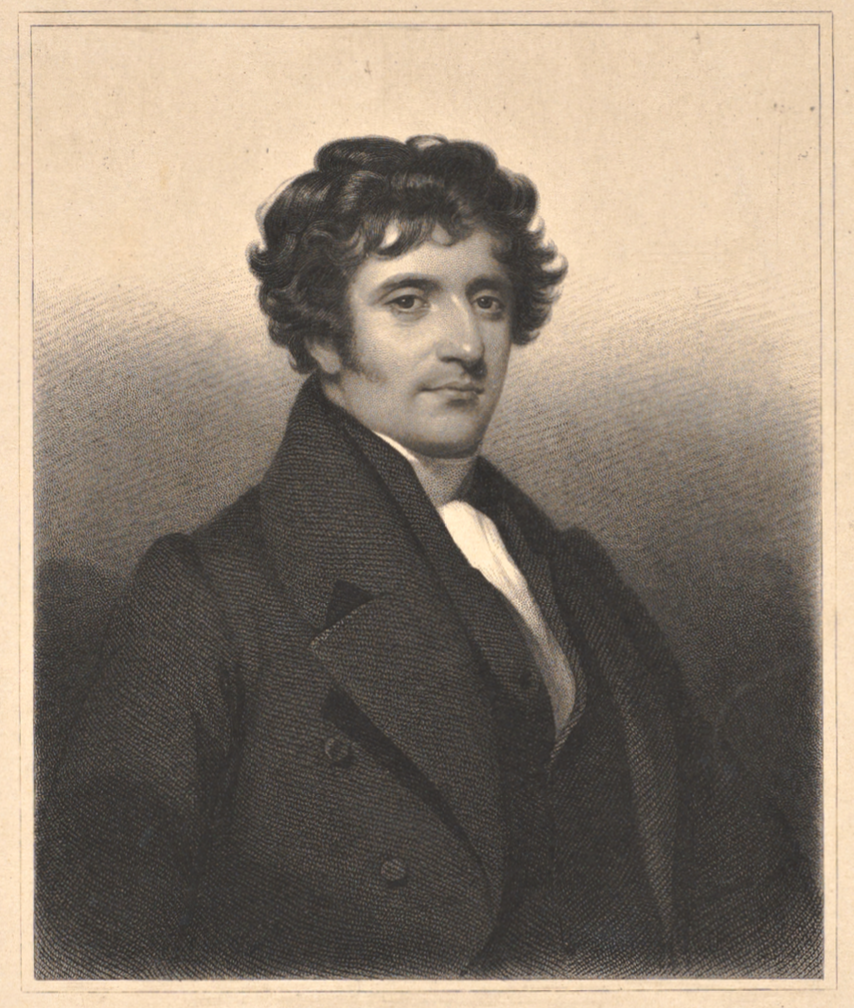
- George Scott; painting by W. Gush; engraved by J. Thomson
- Born: 18 June 1804; Edinburgh, Scotland
- Died: 28 January 1874 (aged 69); Glasgow, Scotland
- Occupation: Methodist missionary
- Spouses: Elizabeth Masson (m. 1824; died 1828) Janet Kelley (m. 1833)
- Children: James Scott

George Scott (18 June 1804 – 28 January 1874) was a Scottish Methodist missionary active in Stockholm from 1830 to 1842. His preaching has been described as the start of Sweden's Great Awakening that began in the 1840s.

== Biography ==
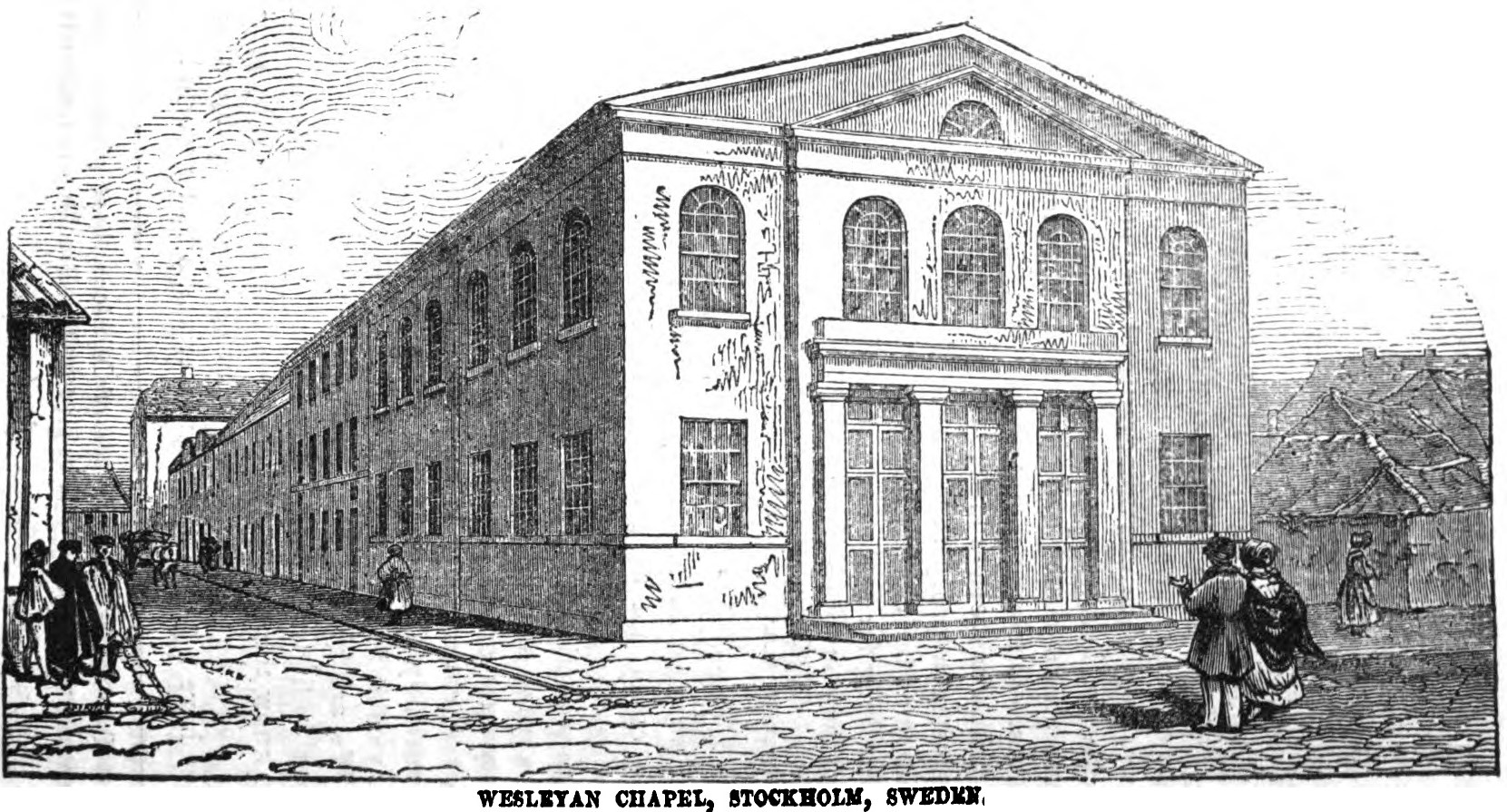
The English Chapel in Stockholm

Scott was born on 18 June 1804 in Edinburgh, Scotland, to Robert Scott, a master tailor, and Margaret Lumley. He grew up in a very religious home. On 2 April 1824 he married Elizabeth Masson; however, she died just a few years later in 1828. Scott was raised Presbyterian but eagerly joined the Wesleyan Methodist Church in 1827, engaging in lay ministry work and becoming a Sunday school teacher. He became a local preacher the next year and was ordained by the Wesleyan Methodist Missionary Society in 1830.

That year, Scott was sent to Stockholm to take over Joseph Rayner Stephens' work. He first worked as a religious teacher and preacher for industrialist Samuel Owen and the British workers in his factory. His goal, while perhaps initially to spread Methodist teachings, was to inspire spiritual renewal among the people in a manner that deemphasized religious sectarianism. He learned Swedish quickly, and in 1831 also began to preach and hold meetings in Swedish, in violation of the Conventicle Act banning all religious meetings other than those of the Church of Sweden. Thus, due to the controversy, "one of his important and successful strategies was to attract influential friends and fellow workers", including Count Mathias Rosenblad and Lord Bloomfield.

In 1832, Owen and Scott initiated one of the first Swedish temperance societies, Kungsholmens Nykterhetsförening; the following year it expanded into the rest of the city of Stockholm. In 1837, the two, along with Bengt Franc-Sparre, August von Hartmansdorff, Jöns Jacob Berzelius, Anders Retzius, and others, founded the Svenska nykterhetssällskapet (the Swedish Temperance Society). The organization would reach over 100,000 members in the 1840s.

In 1833, Scott married Janet Kelley. Their son James Scott (1835–1911) was a missionary to South Africa. Scott's missionary work grew and he founded several periodicals around this time, including Budbäraren, Missionstidningen, and Fosterlandsvännen. Scott initially had the support of some of the clergy from the Church of Sweden. Together with Owen, priest Johan Olof Wallin, bishop Carl Fredrik af Wingård, Rosenblad, and others, Scott founded the Swedish Mission Society (Svenska Missionssällskapet) in 1835, an organization for mission work among the Sámi people. af Wingård also prayed at the chapel's mission prayer that year.

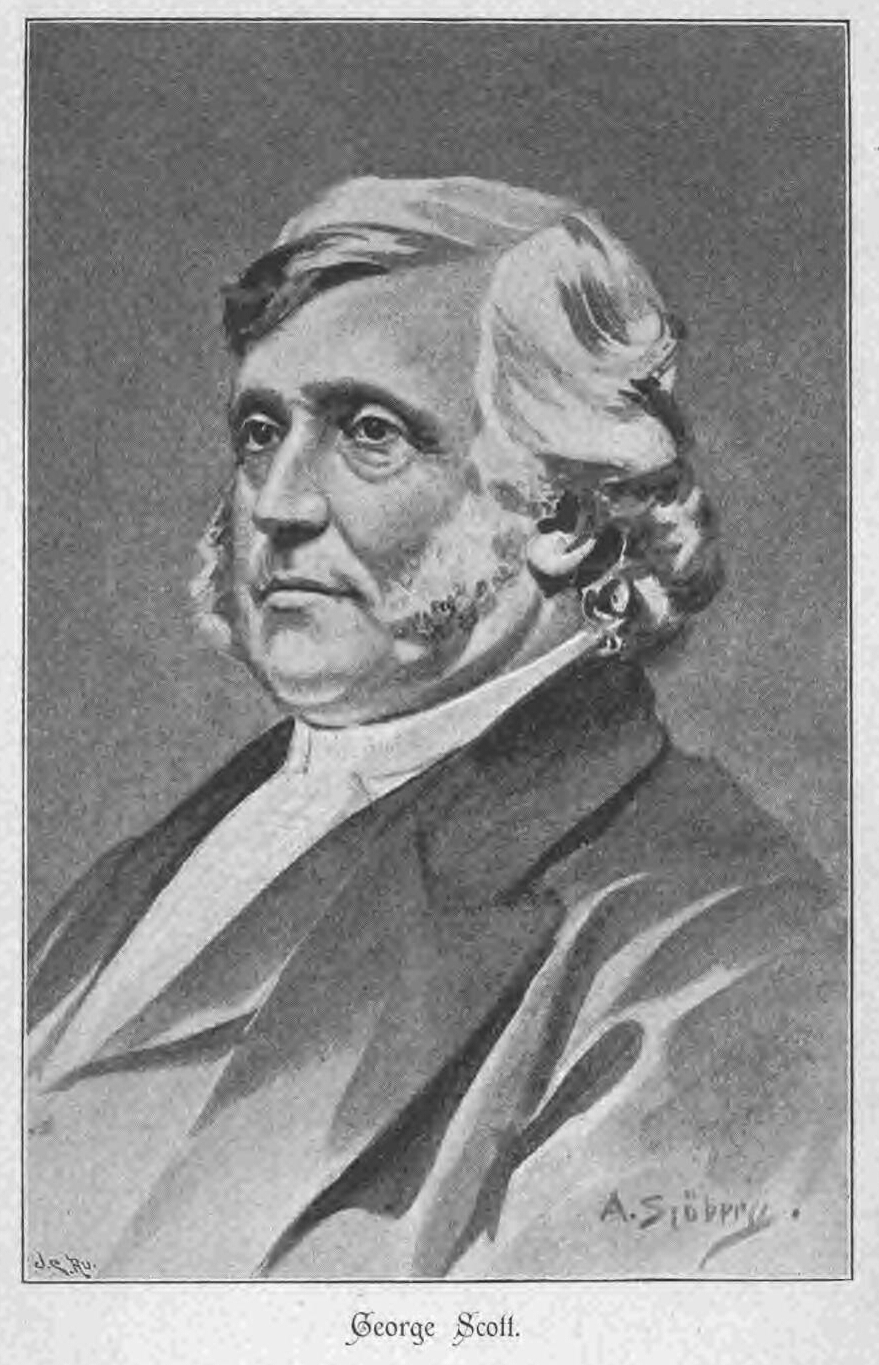
George Scott

Scott's work would build on and influence the growing revivalist movements, including Pietism, Radical Pietism, and the Reader (läsare) movement. With his low-church Pietist views, he inspired and supported several people who would become leaders in the many Swedish revival movements that would flourish in the latter half of the 19th century. Among these were Swedish Baptist pioneers F. O. Nilsson and Anders Wiberg, and co-founder of the organization Evangeliska fosterlandsstiftelsen (EFS, later the Swedish Evangelical Mission) Carl Olof Rosenius. Rosenius initially came to Scott for guidance in a crisis of faith. Scott's inspiration led Rosenius to move to Stockholm to become his assistant; the two maintained a lifelong friendship and worked together for several years. In 1842 Scott and Rosenius would also found the journal Pietisten, for Mission Friends, together. Scott's influence was present in other ways as well: the biographical dictionary Svenskt Biografiskt Lexikon describes Scott's "emphasis on the individual's momentary conversion and adherence to new forms of organization, as well as his connection with the work of the temperance movement" as "decisive for the entire development of the later Free Church movement," stating that, "after the Reformation, hardly any single foreigner has had as great an impact on the transformation of Sweden's religious structure."

Scott raised 2000 pounds in 1837 for the construction of a Methodist church, the English Church (Engelska kyrka). The building, with seating for over one thousand, was designed by Scottish architect Robert Blackwood and a revised version of the plans was submitted by Fredrik Blom. In 1838 Scott received approval for its construction. It was consecrated on 24–25 October 1840 as the first free church in Sweden with Johan Henrik Thomander and Pehr Brandell co-officiating. The church's membership quickly grew and Rosenius also soon took on a preaching role in the church. However, despite the legality of the church's construction, Scott continued to face increasing pressure from both religious circles and the media. He was reported to the state church for offering communion to its members and attacked in sermons. Newspapers Aftonbladet, Tidning för Stora Kopparbergs län, and Dagligt Allehanda wrote articles critical of him, adding to the tension. "By praising the people for leaving [Scott] untouched, new, aggressive signals were given. [Scott] could no longer walk in peace in the streets." At this point, the support of Rosenblad, af Wingård, and Peter Wieselgren began to wane.

In 1841, he traveled to the United States on a fundraising trip at the request of Robert Baird and the American Bible Society in an attempt to pay off the church's debt after construction. During that time, Rosenius took on a greater role. Scott's talks were attended by two Swedes, who wrote home about his descriptions of the situation in Sweden in disparaging terms. Upon Scott's return, the press called for his exile and he was told he was no longer safe. After a riot in the church on Palm Sunday in which Scott's life was threatened, the Governor of Stockholm Mauritz Axel Lewenhaupt banned him from preaching in Swedish. On 30 April, Scott was forced to leave Sweden. His work in Stockholm was then left solely to Rosenius.

The church building remained abandoned until 1851 when preacher Petrus Magnus Elmblad began using it; his preaching in Swedish was allowed to continue. The same year, Scott was contacted in London by Per Palmqvist, brother of pioneer Baptist missionary Gustaf Palmquist, to learn about the Methodists' Sunday schools. At that time, Sunday school was quite uncommon in Sweden; due to Scott's influence, Palmqvist founded the first Baptist Sunday school in the country in the church that year. The building was bought by the EFS in 1857 and renamed Bethlehem Church. Scott continued to work as a traveling preacher taking three-year assignments in cities including Aberdeen, Liverpool, and Newcastle-on-Tyne. He was elected as president of the Methodist conference in Canada in 1866. Scott worked as a preacher until his death in Glasgow on 28 January 1874.
