= Shouter movement =

Swedish Christian revival movement

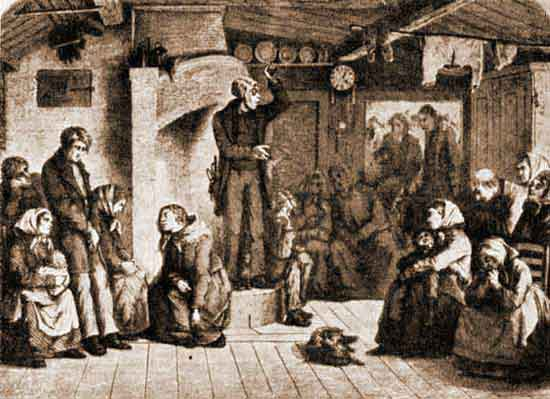
A colporteur in a Småland cottage. Illustration from Ny Illustrerad Tidning.

The Shouter movement (Swedish: Roparerörelsen or Roparrörelsen) was the Swedish Christian revival that paved the way for the folk revival and free church movements in Sweden. Maids, children, peasants' daughters and young men, in a state of calm or ecstatic excitement, delivered stirring sermons that drew large crowds.

It was most prevalent in the provinces of Småland, Västergötland, Värmland and Närke. The revival reached its high point in the early 1840s. The movement was short-lived, essentially disappearing by 1843, but had a major impact on the growth of the folk revival.

== Background ==
The roots of the Shouter movement have been traced to Hoofianism, an ascetic, Pietist, Moravian-influenced movement founded by revivalist priest Jacob Otto Hoof in Svenljunga. His sermons were characterized by a Pietist ideal of piety. Followers of this movement were called Hoofians and were found in Småland and Västergötland; after his death some began to preach in an ecstatic state while seeing visions and preached against sin.

The Shouter movement, one scholar has stated, "can chronologically, and to some extent in terms of content, be seen as a culmination of the older intra-church Reader movement under the inspiration and guidance of priests such as J. O. Hoof, Per Nyman and Peter Lorenz Sellergren."

== Preachers and themes ==
Shouters were primarily children and young, unmarried women, most of them in their teens and older, up to about 30 years of age. Some older members of the community were also involved.

Three factors characterize the movement's preachers, according to Peter Aronsson:

1. physical convulsions, sometimes so strong that they fall into unconsciousness or stupor.

2. an immediate need to preach. Both timing and content are uncontrollable by the shouter.

3. The content of the [sermon] is partly condemnation of haughtiness and the vices of the time, partly prophesying about the final judgment, one's own death and one's own successors.

The Shouter movement emerged as a reaction against the vices of the time. Preaching included judgment and punishment of all kinds of lying, vanity and hypocrisy, as well as dancing, gambling, and the widespread drinking of alcohol. It also featured references to forgiveness and grace from God.

The sermons were numerous and could vary greatly in length. People walked long distances to hear the shouters, mainly the landless and crofters who had been hardest hit by the famine years of the time. Poverty was widespread, largely due to excessive drinking; wages were often paid in the form of liquor. The assemblies often demanded changes of both an ecclesiastical and secular nature.

== Resistance from authorities ==
The shouters were strongly opposed by the educated and by clergymen, who saw the movement as a disease. Bishops enlisted the help of the police and the county governor's office, as the crowds were a violation of the law, the Conventicle Act, which prohibited public religious gatherings led by laity, i.e. people who were not priests in the Swedish state church. Doctors also prescribed drugs to stop the "preaching disease" (predikosjukan).

== Smedberg and the religious war ==
Adam Smedberg, born in 1813 in Skaraborg County, held an important role as a Shouter preacher, with women kneeling in reverence as he passed by. When he was injured in a skirmish, the newspaper Nerikes Allehanda described the scene, stating: "the blood flowing from his head was drained away, and the water, which was mixed with his blood at the washing, was drunk with the greatest eagerness, all while saying that this was the true Eucharist, and that the blood of the wounded shouter was as holy as the Savior's".

The Shouter movement was strongly linked to the province of Närke. Kvistbro parish became a center for the shouters in Närke, where open-air meetings were held with up to 3,000 listeners. In midsummer 1843, three wandering shouters from Västergötland arrived in Kvistbro. The previous year, Smedberg had met shouters Johan Magnus Vigerell and 14-year-old Johannes Ljungholm. Around 3,000 people had gathered at this meeting. Smedberg stood on top of a wagon and spoke, preaching for several hours. He then fell from it to the ground as if dead. The 14-year-old continued preaching until Smedberg recovered. It is said that several from the audience also fell to the ground dazed.

This proved too much for the governor of Örebro, Erik Johan Bergenschöld, who sent out men to arrest Smedberg, resulting in fierce clashes with the crowds, who stood up for the shouters and armed themselves with clubs and guns. After three days of fighting, Smedberg and 14 others were arrested. The event has been called the religious war in Kvistbro. Smedberg and some 20 others were fined and imprisoned. Smedberg never preached again. He returned to his hometown and in 1882 ended up in Hova poorhouse, Skaraborg, where he died ten years later.

== Social impact and influence ==
One scholar has argued that the movement "could be understood as a way for marginalized women to make their voices heard." Historian Ragnar Redelius describes it as an "attack on the 'masters' as an 'individualistic' progress in a proto-democratic milieu".

A preacher named Otto Engström was counted among the shouters in Närke, and continued to preach despite repeated prison stays. He, and later August Carleson, are considered to be precursors to the Riseberg movement and thus to the Swedish revivalist movement in general.

== In culture ==
The 2023 film Barfota Rop ('Barefoot Shout') is based on events during the emergence of the Shouter movement.

== See also ==
- Nyevangelism
- Sleeping preacher
