= Peter Lorenz Sellergren =

Swedish Lutheran priest (1768–1843)

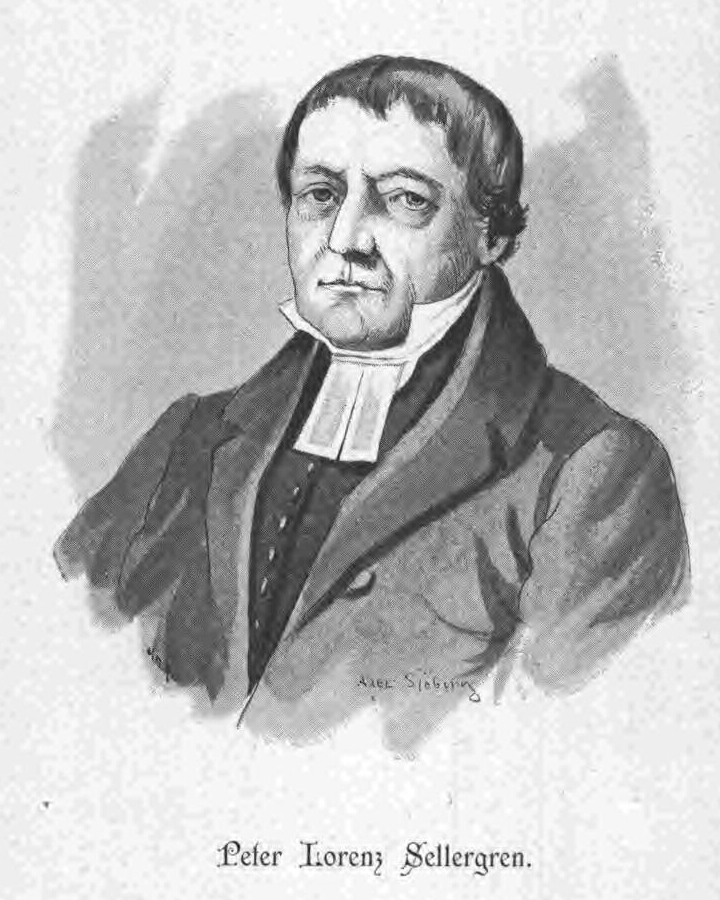
- Born: 9 April 1768; Jönköping, Sweden
- Died: 1 May 1843 (aged 75); Halleberga parish, Småland, Sweden
- Occupations: Lutheran priest, theologian
- Employer: Church of Sweden
- Spouse: Anna Maria Petersdotter (m. 1823; died 1828)

Peter Lorenz Sellergren (9 April 1768 – 1 May 1843) was a Swedish Lutheran priest, theologian, and gammalkyrklig ('old church', characterized by emphasis on the Lutheran faith and the church's orders) revivalist preacher.

== Biography ==
Peter Lorenz Sellergren was born in Jönköping in 1768 to gunsmith Petter Sellegren and Anna Maria Björkander. He later changed the spelling of his name to distance himself from priest Petrus Sellegren. Sellergren's parents died when he was young.

Sellergren, able to afford to study through the support of friends and family, began his studies in Lund in 1788. He supported himself through preaching and private tutoring. He was ordained a priest in 1794, and became a cathedral assistant in Växjö. In 1812 he became assistant vicar in Hälleberga in the Diocese of Växjö. He was considered to be richly talented and was highly regarded as a preacher. One well-known sermon was known for its "deep remorse and heartfelt longing for repentance." Sellergren's preaching was often aimed at everyone: "the sleeping, the awakened and the converted, sometimes even different age groups."

After his faith began to falter in contact with Enlightenment literature, he indulged in alcohol abuse to the point that he was called to the cathedral chapter in 1813 and forced to take a leave of absence. Physically as well as mentally weak, he experienced a remarkable religious breakthrough during that time and was able to continue his priestly ministry thereafter. He became like "a new man" who "burned with the desire to save, if possible, the whole world".

Sellergren found a renewed faith based on Lutheran orthodoxy, the läsare (Reader) movement, Pietism, and Moravian beliefs, although he would later discourage the reading of Moravian books. Despite his criticism of the Reader movement in general, Bishop Esaias Tegnér praised Sellergren's preaching.

In 1823, he married Anna Maria Petersdotter.

Later in life, he was plagued by poor health. During this time he relied on the help of a number of priests and stayed in contact with many others, including Pehr Nyman, Peter Wieselgren, and Erland Carlsson, who later helped found the Augustana Lutheran Synod. Sellergren died in 1843 in Hälleberga, Småland.

== Influence ==
Sellergren's revival focused on the reading of the Bible (läseri), holding fast to the Lutheran confession and the Bible as a guide for life. He focused on the atonement and the importance of sanctification. As a preacher and pastor, Sellergren exerted influence far and wide and became one of the leading figures of the 19th-century church revival, a "church father in a chaplain's house". His preaching was of an Old Pietistic nature, but in time, partly through the influence of Johann Arndt and Johan Möller, bishop of Visby, it acquired a stronger evangelical element. Sellergren is said to have been seen as something close to an apostle among the population and to have had a great influence on the clergy of the diocese.

He made an impression on the Palmqvist family, several of whom (Per, Gustaf, and Johannes) would later become pioneers in the early Swedish Baptist movement in Sweden and the United States. A friend of jurist and advocate of religious freedom Lars Vilhelm Henschen, Sellergren also affected Henschen's beliefs.

== Works ==
- Bref i andeliga ämnen (1843)
- Det gamla budskapet. Predikningar och sånger (1925)
