= 61st New York Infantry Regiment =

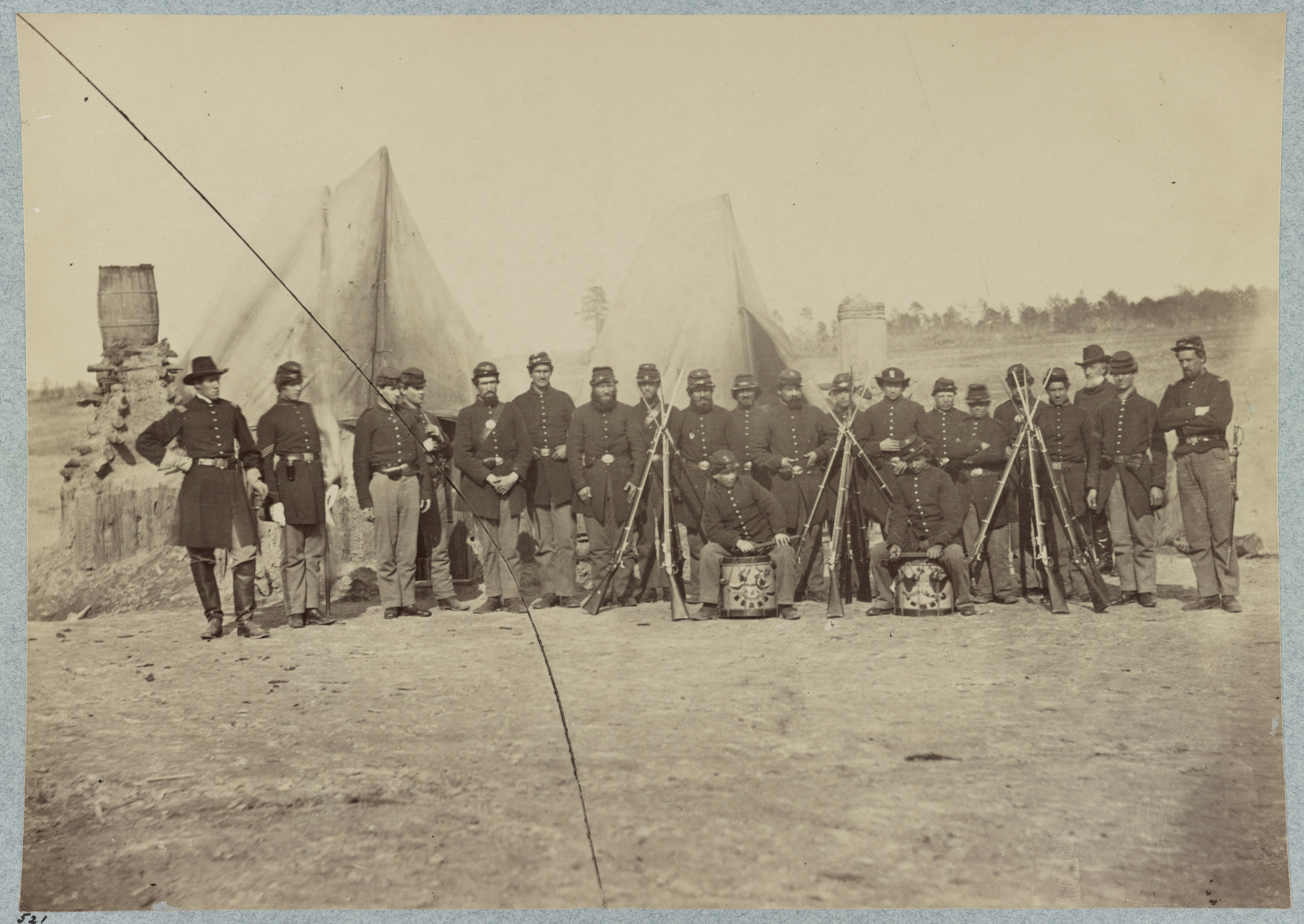
- Active: October 25, 1861 – July 14, 1865
- Disbanded: July 14, 1865
- Country: United States
- Allegiance: Union
- Branch: Union Army
- Type: Regiment
- Role: Infantry
- Size: 1526 men (total)
- Nickname(s): Clinton Guards; Astor Regiment; Astor Rifles
- Engagements: American Civil War: Battle of Yorktown; Battle of Fair Oaks; Seven Days' Battles; Battle of Antietam; Battle of Fredericksburg; Battle of Chancellorsville; Battle of Gettysburg; Battle of Bristoe Station; Mine Run Campaign; Battle of the Wilderness; Battle of Spotsylvania Courthouse; Battle of Cold Harbor; Siege of Petersburg; First Battle of Deep Bottom; Second Battle of Ream's Station; Battle of Hatcher's Run; Appomattox Campaign; Battle of Farmville (Cumberland Church); Battle of Appomattox Court House

Commanders
- Notable commanders: Col. Francis C. Barlow; Col. Nelson A. Miles

Insignia
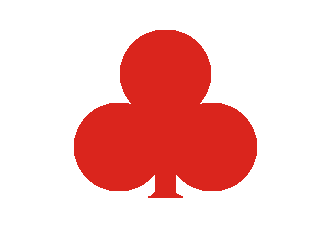
- 1st Division, II Corps

The 61st New York Infantry Regiment, also known as the "Astor Regiment", was an infantry regiment of the Union Army during the American Civil War.

== Service ==
The regiment was organized in New York City on October 25, 1861, and was mustered in for a three-year enlistment in October, November, and December, 1861; the regiment was formed by consolidation of the Astor Rifles (or Regiment) with the Clinton Guards. At the expiration of its term of service, the men entitled thereto were discharged and the regiment retained in service, but at the same time consolidating Companies G and K into the other companies; on December 20, 1864, the men of the 54th New York Volunteer Infantry not mustered out with their regiment were transferred, forming the new Companies G and K.

The companies were all recruited principally in New York City, except Company C at Madison (now Colgate) University, Hamilton, and the second Company I, recruited in Albany and vicinity.

The regiment left the State November 9, 1861; served at Washington, D. C., from November 10, 1861; in Howard's Brigade, Sumner's Division, Army of the Potomac, from November 27, 1861; in Howard's, 1st, Brigade, Richardson's, 1st, Division, 2d Corps, Army of the Potomac, from March 13, 1862-; in 3d Brigade, 1st Division, 2d Corps, from July, 1862- in 1st Brigade 1st Division, 2d Corps, from September, 1862; in 2d Brigade, 1st Division 2d Corps, from October, 1862; in 1st Brigade, 1st Division, 2d Corps, from November, 1862; and it was mustered out and honorably discharged July 14, 1865, at Alexandria, Virginia.

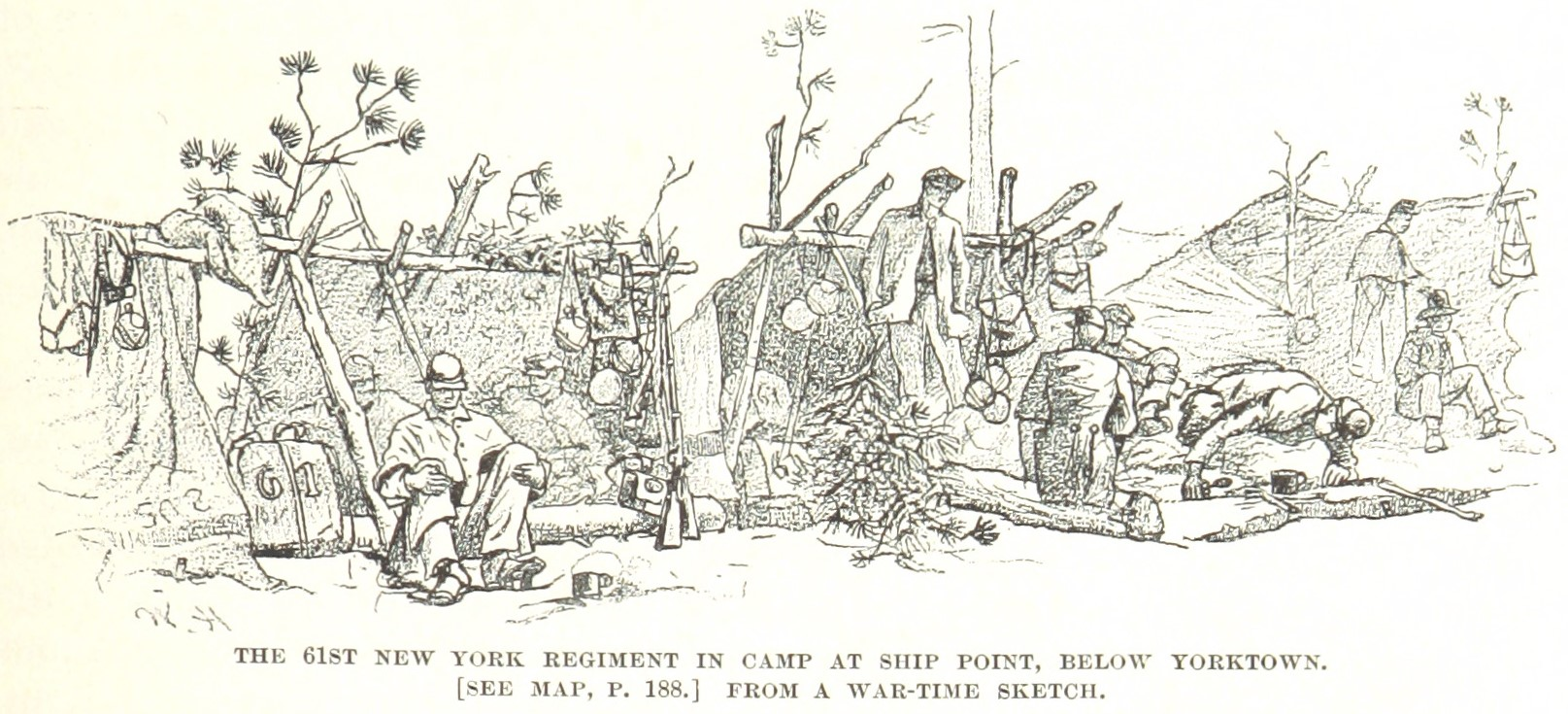
Members of the regiment at Yorktown

The 1908 book The Union army: a history of military affairs in the loyal states, 1861-65 -- records of the regiments in the Union army -- cyclopedia of battles -- memoirs of commanders and soldiers gives the following description of the regiment's service:

This regiment, was stationed for a short time at Washington, but moved on to Manassas on Nov. 28. It moved on to the Peninsula early in the spring, took part in the operations of the siege of Yorktown and was first closely engaged in the battle of Fair Oaks (Also called Seven Pines), in which 106 were killed or wounded and 4 reported missing, out of 432 who went into action. There Lieut. Col. Massett and many other gallant men lost their lives. The loss in the Seven Days' battles was still greater, and the ranks that gathered at Harrison's landing after the battle of Malvern hill were sadly depleted. At Antietam the regiment was in the thick of the fight - led by Colonel Francis C. Barlow, the 61st NY, with the 64th NY, flanked the 'sunken road' which was holding up the advance, and delivered enfilade fire on the confederates in the road, and at Fredericksburg it served in Hancock's division in the charge on Marye's heights and lost 36 in killed, wounded and missing. At Chancellorsville in May, 1863,. the troops under Col. Miles made a gallant defense of the retreating union army which won them high praise, and at Gettysburg the loss was once more severe, participating on the II Corps' advance in the 'Wheatfield', where the regiment was exposed to heavy enemy fire, losing more than half its strength. There was little rest for the worn regiment during the autumn. At Auburn, Bristoe Station (where the II Corps shattered an attack by Confederate general AP Hill), Rappahannock Station and in the Mine Run campaign, it was active, and it was mid-winter when it finally established permanent quarters near Brandy Station. In December and January a large number of men reenlisted and received veteran furlough. The regiment was reunited in the spring of 1864 and served with honor through the severe fighting which led up to Cold Harbor and Petersburg, suffering most severely in the bloody angle at Spotsylvania. It joined in the first assault on Petersburg, June 15; was engaged at Deep Bottom, Strawberry Plains, Reams' station and Hatcher's Run. It was present at the Fall of Petersburg, joined in the pursuit to Appomattox, and was engaged at Sailor's creek and Farmville. Its record is a long and glorious one and it bravely earned its right to rank among the most gallant organizations of the Union army.

== Total strength and casualties ==
The total enrollment of the command was 1,526 members; during its service the regiment lost by death, killed in action, 11 officers, 113 enlisted men of wounds received in action, 5 officers, 67 enlisted men; of disease and other causes, 2 officers 134 enlisted men; total, 18 officers, 314 enlisted men; aggregate, 332; of whom 46 enlisted men died in the hands of the enemy.

== Commanders ==
- Colonel Spencer W. Cone
- Colonel Francis Channing Barlow
- Colonel Nelson Appleton Miles
- Lieutenant Colonel Oscar Broady
- Colonel George Washington Scott

== See also ==
- List of New York Civil War regiments
