= Mariners' Temple =

Church in Manhattan, New York

Coordinates: 40°42′46.6″N 73°59′52.0″W

- U.S. National Register of Historic Places
- U.S. Historic district – Contributing property
- New York State Register of Historic Places
- New York City Landmark
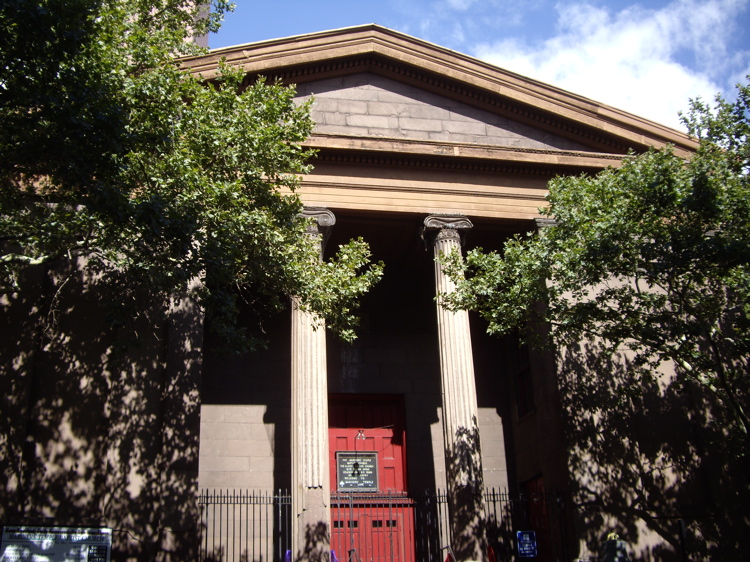

- Location within Lower Manhattan Location within New York Location within the United States
- Location: 12 Oliver Street, Manhattan, New York
- Built: 1845
- Architect: possibly Isaac Lucas
- Architectural style: Greek Revival
- Part of: Two Bridges Historic District (ID03000845)
- NRHP reference No.: 80002700
- NYSRHP No.: 06101.000038
- NYCL No.: 0214

Significant dates
- Added to NRHP: April 16, 1980
- Designated CP: August 29, 2003
- Designated NYSRHP: June 23, 2003
- Designated NYCL: February 1, 1966

Mariners' Temple is a Baptist church at 3 Henry Street, in the Two Bridges section of Manhattan, New York City. It is a brownstone building with Ionic columns. It is a church member of the American Baptist Churches USA (ABCUSA).

== History ==
The church was established in 1795 as Oliver Street Baptist Church. The building was inaugurated in 1845. Early Swedish Baptist leaders Anders Wiberg and John Alexis Edgren were ordained in the church in 1852 and 1866, respectively. Reverend Dr. Henrietta Carter became pastor in 1998.

== Beliefs ==
The church has a Baptist confession of faith and is part of the American Baptist Churches USA.

== See also ==
- National Register of Historic Places listings in Manhattan below 14th Street
- List of New York City Designated Landmarks in Manhattan below 14th Street
