= Reinhold Hedberg =

Finnish politician

August Reinhold Hedberg (7 January 1862, Petalax - 28 February 1922) was a Finnish Lutheran clergyman and politician. He was a member of the Parliament of Finland from 1907 to 1909 and again from 1917 to 1919, representing the Swedish People's Party of Finland (SFP). He was the son of Fredrik Gabriel Hedberg and the younger brother of John Hedberg.
