= John Alexis Edgren =

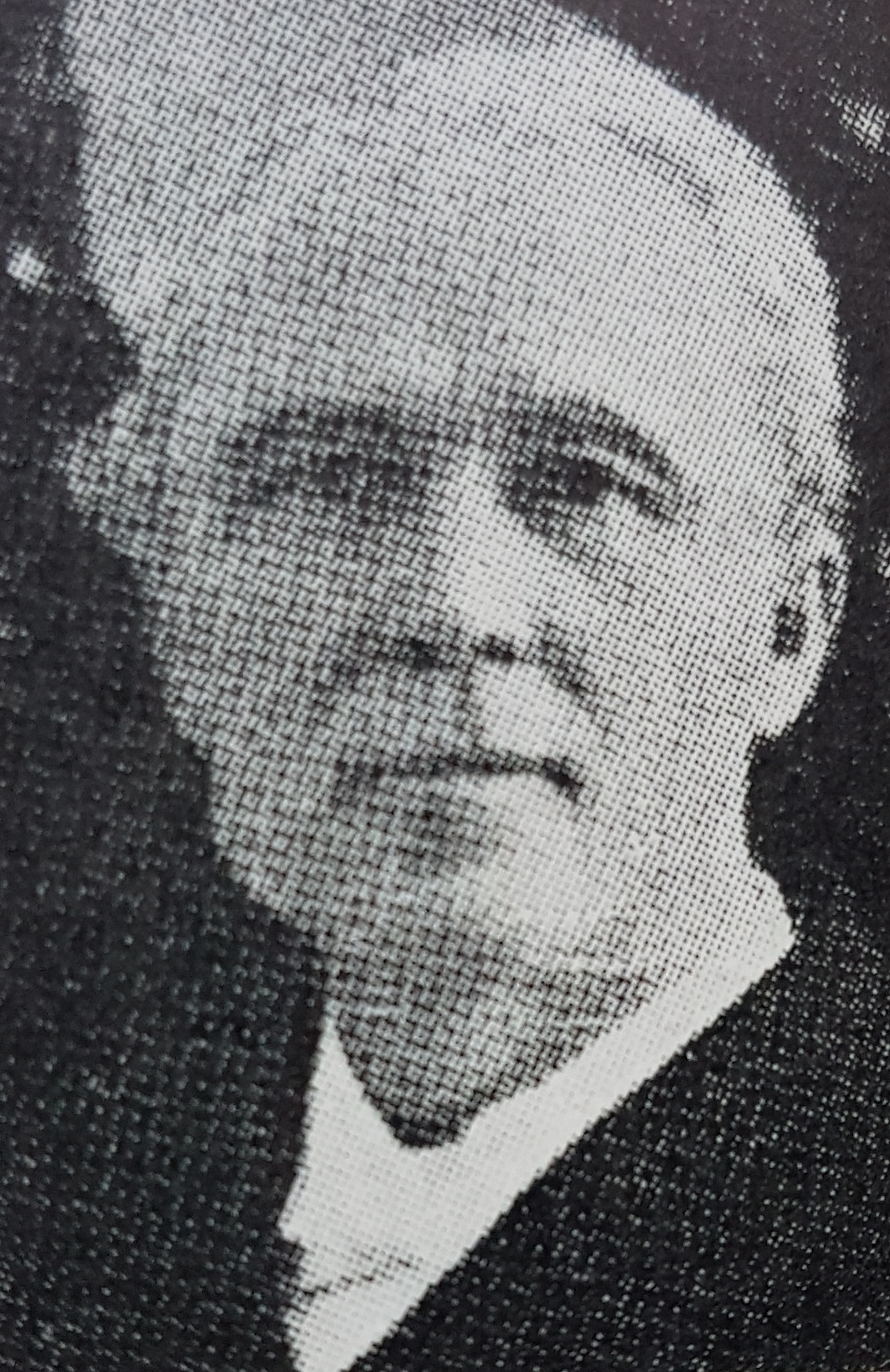
- Photographed portrait image from Svenskt konstnärslexikon.
- Born: Johan Alexander Edgren; February 20, 1839; Östanås, Värmland, Sweden
- Died: January 26, 1908 (aged 68); Oakland, California
- Resting place: Mountain View Cemetery, Oakland, California
- Occupation: Baptist minister
- Years active: 1871–1887
- Parent(s): Axel Edgren; Mathilda Berger
- Relatives: August Hjalmar Edgren (brother)
- Military career
- Allegiance: United States of America
- Branch: United States Navy
- Service years: 1862–1865
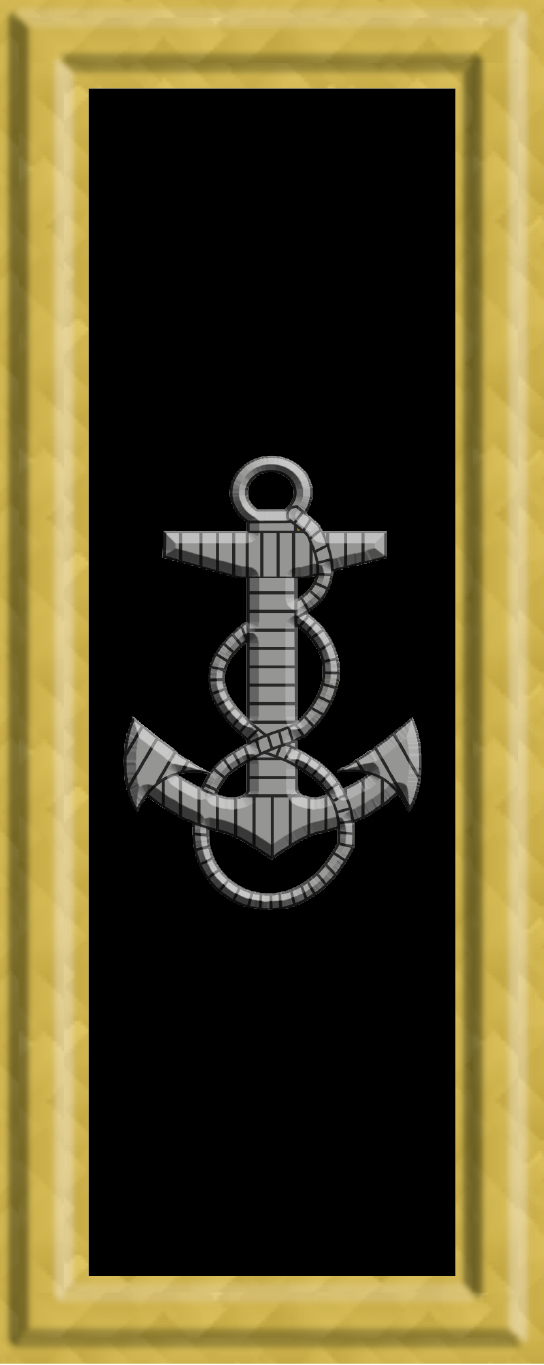
- Rank: Ensign
- Conflicts: American Civil War

Orders
- Ordination: 1866

John Alexis Edgren (February 20, 1839 – January 26, 1908) was a Swedish-American Baptist minister. Edgren began what eventually evolved into Bethel University and the Bethel Theological Seminary in St. Paul, Minnesota.

== Career ==
Edgren was ordained as a Baptist minister in 1866 at the Mariners' Baptist Church in New York. He then spent some time as a missionary in Sweden, sent by the American Baptist Missionary Union.

== See also ==
- Oscar Broady – contemporaneous Swedish Baptist missionary
- Gustaf Palmquist – contemporaneous Swedish Baptist missionary
- Anders Wiberg – contemporaneous Swedish Baptist missionary

== Sources ==
- Ahlstrom, Louis John (1938). John Alexis Edgren, soldier, educator, author, journalist: A biography. Conference Press.
