= Oscar Broady =

Petty officer in the Swedish Navy

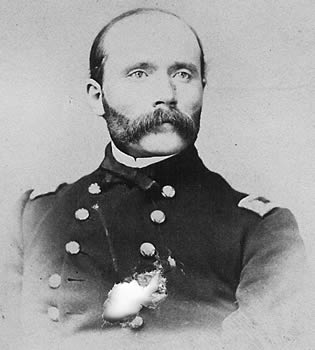
- Born: Knut Oscar Brundin; May 28, 1832; Uppsala, Sweden
- Died: March 13, 1922 (aged 89); Stockholm, Sweden
- Burial place: Norra begravningsplatsen
- Military career
- Allegiance: Sweden; United States
- Branch: Swedish Navy (United States) Union Army
- Service years: 1848–1854; 1861–1864
- Rank: Petty officer, RSN; Lieutenant colonel, USV; Brevet colonel, USV
- Nicknames: Knut Oscar Broady, K. O. Broady
- Unit: 61st New York Vols. Inf.
- Commands: Fourth Brigade, First Division, Second Army Corps, Army of the Potomac.
- Conflicts: American Civil War: Battle of Yorktown; Battle of Fair Oaks; Seven Days' Battles; Battle of Antietam; Battle of Fredericksburg; Battle of Chancellorsville; Battle of Gettysburg; Battle of Bristoe Station; Mine Run Campaign; Battle of the Wilderness; Battle of Spotsylvania Courthouse; Battle of Cold Harbor; Second Battle of Ream's Station. WIA
- Awards: D.D. 1877; LL.D. 1916

Knut Oscar Broady (May 28, 1832 – March 13, 1922) was a petty officer in the Swedish navy who emigrated to the United States. During the Civil War he rose to the command of a brigade in the Union Army. After returning to Sweden as a Baptist missionary, he became the first president of the Swedish Baptist Bethel Seminary.

== Early life ==
Broady was born in Uppsala, the son of a niterworker, went to school in Stockholm, and began clerking in a store at the age of 13. At age 16 he enlisted in the Swedish navy, becoming a petty officer in 1852, and married the same year. Two years later he and his wife decided to emigrate to the United States, but his wife died at sea. In New York Broady became a convinced Baptist, and enrolled at Madison University in New York State, today's Colgate University, where he pursued his studies at the same time as preaching to a local Baptist congregation. Broady graduated with a B.A. in 1861, and entered into his second marriage shortly thereafter.

== Civil War ==
When the American Civil War began, the students at Madison University raised a volunteer company, and offered it to United States service. In September 1861 the company became Company C, 61st New York Volunteer Infantry Regiment, and Broady became its captain. A year later Broady was promoted to lieutenant colonel, and in the spring of 1863 he became, as lieutenant colonel, commanding officer of the regiment. In the summer of 1864 Broady became, still a lieutenant colonel, a brigade commander in the Army of the Potomac. A month later he was wounded in action at the Second Battle of Ream's Station, and had to leave his command. He was subsequently mustered out of United States, outside of Petersburg, Virginia. In 1865 Broady was brevetted colonel, United States Volunteers.

== Baptist pioneer ==
In 1866 Broady returned to Sweden, under his American name, as a missionary in the service of the American Baptist Foreign Mission Society of Boston. In Sweden he became the first president of the Swedish Baptist Bethel Seminary, a predecessor of the Stockholm School of Theology, a position he held until 1906. Broady held a number of positions of trust in the Swedish Baptist movement, and was an avid temperance advocate. In 1877 Madison University honored him with the degree of Doctor of Divinity, and in 1916 the degree of Legum Doctor was conferred of him by its successor, the Colgate University.

== See also ==
- John Alexis Edgren – contemporaneous Swedish Baptist missionary
- Gustaf Palmquist – contemporaneous Swedish Baptist missionary
- Anders Wiberg – contemporaneous Swedish Baptist missionary
