= Pehr Brandell =

Swedish Lutheran priest (1781–1841)

- Born: 1 January 1781; Piteå församling, Sweden
- Died: 4 May 1841 (aged 60); Ullånger, Sweden
- Other names: Per, Petrus, Petter
- Occupation: Priest
- Employer: Church of Sweden
- Known for: Role in the Pietist movement in Norrland, Sweden
- Spouse: Anna Brita Geting (m. 1816)
- Children: 13, 8 surviving to adulthood, including preachers: Simon Brandell; Petrus Brandell

Pehr Brandell, also known as Per, Petrus, and Petter, (1 January 1781 – 4 May 1841) was a Swedish Lutheran priest known for his role in the 19th-century revivalist movement in Norrland.

== Biography ==
=== Upbringing, education, and work ===
Brandell was born in 1781 in Piteå rural parish (landsförsamling), Portsnäs, Sweden, to tailor Per Brandell and Katarina Olsdotter. He grew up in an Old Reader movement (gammalläseri) home, part of the Pietist movement growing in Norrland at the time. As a young man, he is said to have stopped the festivities at a dance to warn the attendees, comparing the activity to the worship of the golden calf in the Bible. At 21 years of age he had a spiritual awakening after a crisis of faith. Known for his almost verbatim recollection of Luther's sermons, he was persuaded to study theology at the seminary in Uppsala, completing his education within a year in 1812 after some interruptions to his education due to the Finnish War in 1808. Philosopher Christopher Jacob Boström, during his brief theological studies, was one of Brandell's classmates.

He became an assistant and vice-pastor not long after, first in Högsjö in 1812, then in Nora for Bishop Erik Abraham Almquist in 1817, Skog in 1831, and Ullånger in 1836. The Svenskt biografiskt lexikon describes him at this stage, stating, "in Brandell, as in the Norrland New Reader movement in general, the Old Reader demand for repentance and sanctification was combined with the certainty, boldness and joy of the Herrnhuter [Moravian] view on salvation." He was known for his gripping and extemporaneous revivalist preaching, especially during his time in Nora, Ångermanland, where he served as assistant to Bishop Frans Michael Franzén. People traveled great distances to hear Brandell's preaching. He was highly esteemed for his pastoral care work, his care for the mentally ill, and was a pioneer in the care of the poor and other practical work. Brandell initially believed in alcohol use in moderation but became part of the temperance movement in the 1830s.

He suffered from poor health due to dental problems and traveled to Stockholm in 1840 to undergo an operation. While there, he stayed with Scottish Methodist missionary George Scott for several months, giving lectures and preaching at the consecration of the controversial English Church (today Bethlehem Church).

Brandell died in 1841 in Ullånger parish, Sweden. After his death, he was harshly attacked by the Nordisk kyrkotidning, partly for his connection to Scott, who had been forced to leave the country; Franzén came to his defense, referring to him as "the incomparable teacher".

=== Family ===
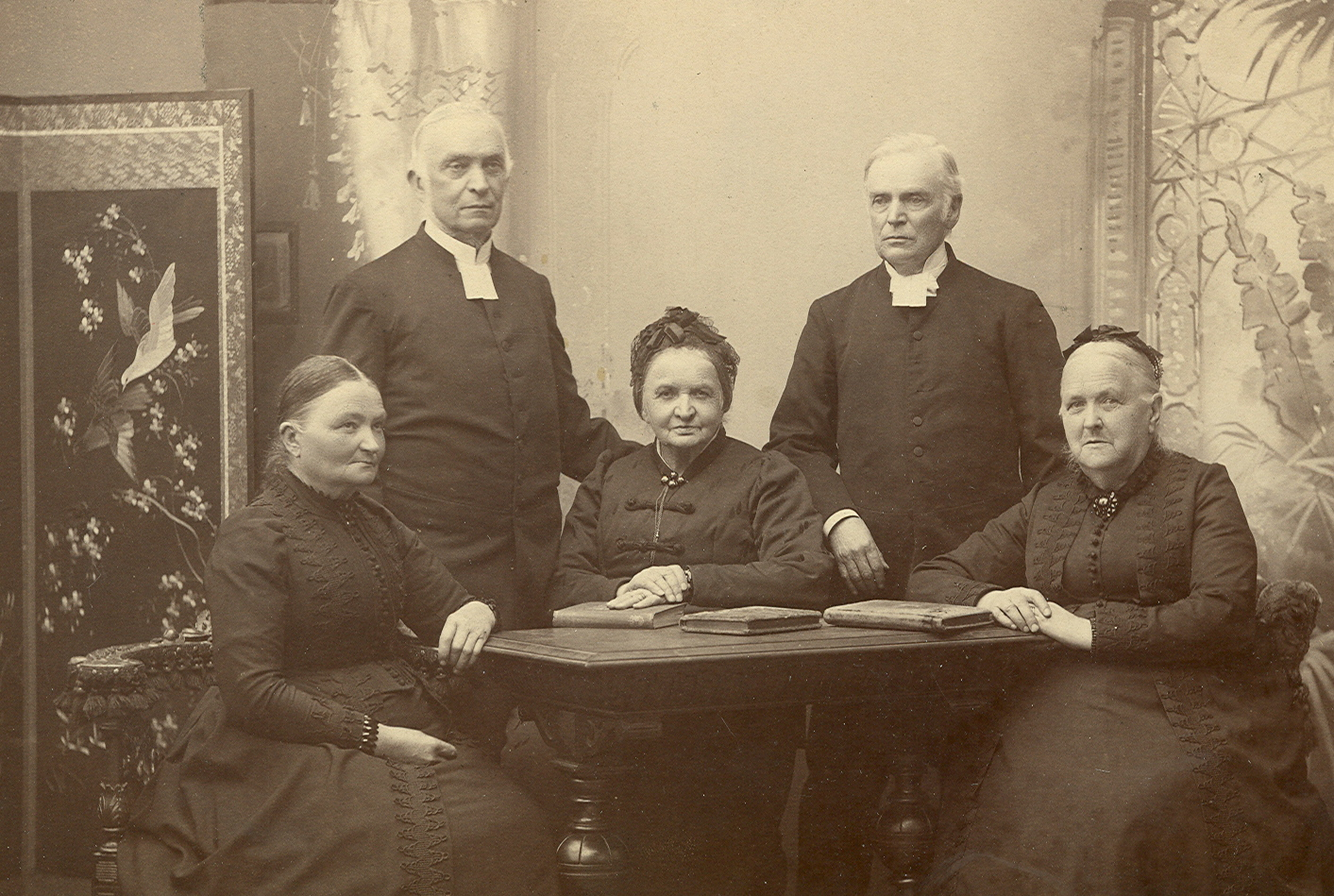
Children from left to right: Maria, Petrus, Anna, Simon, and Karin Brandell, c. 1880–1890.

On 21 March 1816, Brandell married Anna Brita Geting. The couple had thirteen children: Carin (also spelled Karin, 1816–1905), Simon (1818), Petrus (1819–1919), Anna (1820–1899, married Olof Emmanuel Näslund), Simon (1822–1895), Isac (1824), David (1825), Ulrika (1827), Abraham (1828), Emanuel (1830), Emanuel (1832), Christina (1834), and Maria (1836). Eight survived to adulthood. Sons Petrus (Pehr) and Simon also became priests; Simon has been described as "one of Norrland's most important priests during the 19th century".

=== Influence ===
Brandell would influence some of the key figures in the Swedish revival movements. He was friends with priest Anders Rosenius (1780–1841), father of Carl Olof Rosenius. He had a great influence on Carl Olof during his breakthrough period and paved the way for his impact on the country's religious development. Brandell is also known for his role in the founding of Laestadianism: he made an impact on Milla Clementsdotter, a Southern Sámi woman who had come to Nora to hear his preaching and assuage her doubts. Clementsdotter would later provide spiritual guidance to a young Lars Levi Laestadius, who had also read about Brandell's revival, leading him to become a revivalist preacher.

Brandell also contributed to the conversion experience of Lars Vilhelm Henschen, known for his fight for religious freedom; Henschen was also friends with son Petrus Brandell, who lived with him for a time.
