= Bethlehem Church (Stockholm) =

- Betlehemskyrkan
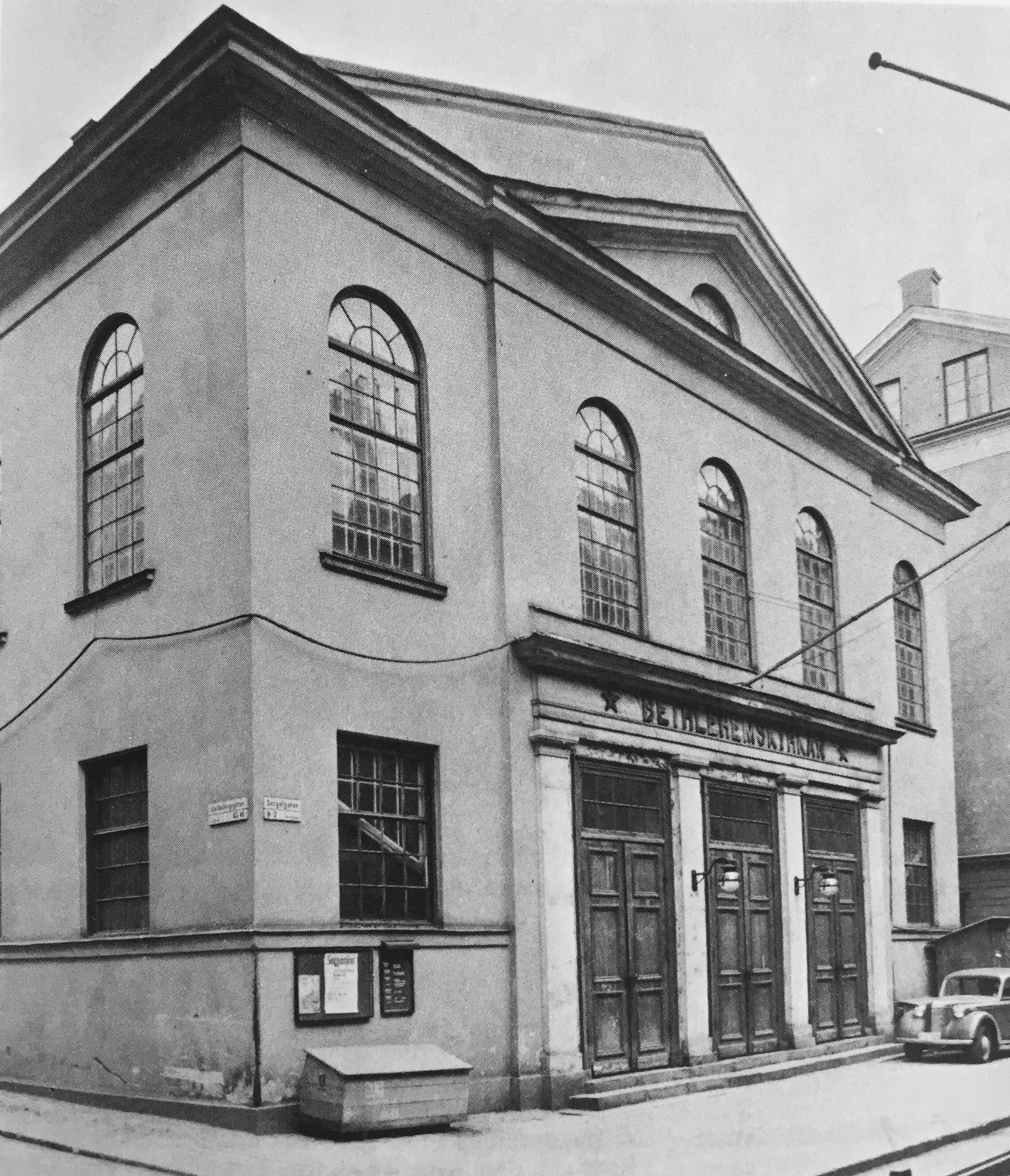
- First church building
- Bethlehem Church
- Location: Stockholm, Sweden
- Denomination: Swedish Evangelical Mission
- Building details

General information
- Location: Sergelgatan 6, Stockholm, Sweden
- Coordinates: 59°20′0.8946″N 18°3′50.223″E
- Inaugurated: 24–25 October 1840
- Demolished: 1953

General information
- Location: Luntmakargatan 82, Stockholm, Sweden
- Coordinates: 59°20′34″N 18°3′31″E
- Inaugurated: 2 December 1956

Building details

Bethlehem Church (Swedish: Betlehemskyrkan) is the Swedish Evangelical Mission's church in Stockholm, Sweden. The old church building was consecrated in October 1840 as Sweden's first free church building, under the name Engelska kapellet ('the English Chapel'). It was located near Hötorget in Norrmalm, where the second and third Hötorget buildings are now located and was taken over by the Swedish Evangelical Mission in connection with the founding of the organization in 1856. The church was demolished in 1953 in conjunction with the redevelopment of Norrmalm. The new church was consecrated in 1956 at Luntmakargatan in Vasastan.

== Bethlehem Church at Sergelgatan ==
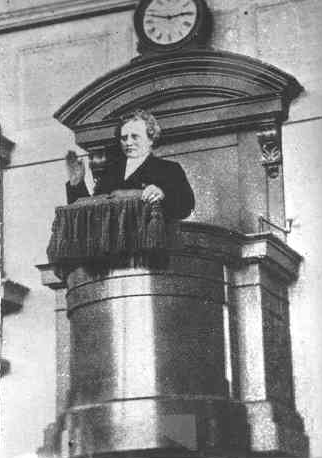
Carl Olof Rosenius preaching in Bethlehem Church

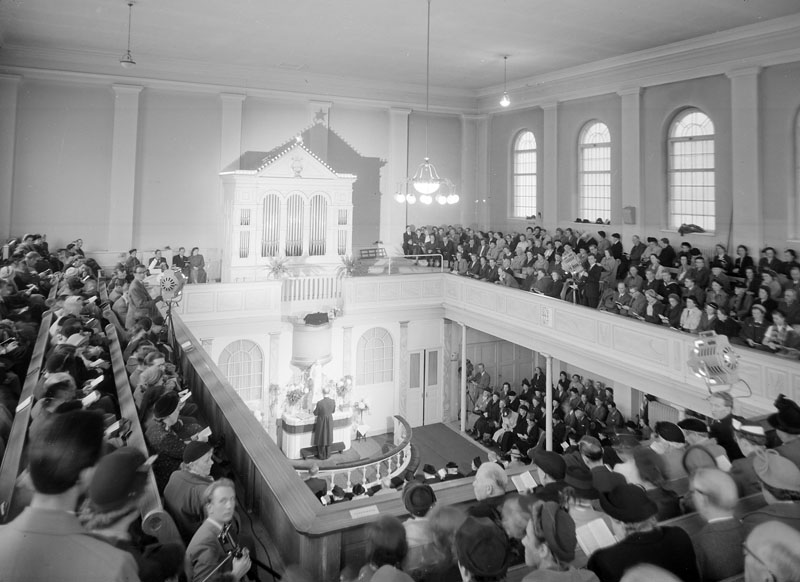
The last service at Sergelgatan, 1953, by Lennart af Petersens, (1913–2004), from Stockholm City Museum.

At the request of industrialist Samuel Owen of the Wesleyan Methodist society in England, pastor George Scott was sent to Stockholm in 1830. He initially preached in a gazebo at Västra Trädgårdsgatan, which was provided by Carl De Geer. The crowds grew, and generous donations from England and North America (Scott was able to raise over 2000 pounds in 1837) enabled the building of the Engelska kapellet ('English Chapel'). The building, which was the first free church building in the country, was erected in 1838–1840 in what was then the Putten block at the junction of Östra Beridarebansgatan and Grytgjutaregatan (later Sergelgatan 6/Jakobsbergsgatan). It was consecrated on 24–25 October 1840 with Johan Henrik Thomander and Pehr Brandell co-officiating. The plans were designed by Scottish architect Robert Blackwood and based on English blueprints for a small Methodist chapel, which after an initial rejection by the Office of the Superintendent, were modified by superintendent Fredrik Blom. The church was rectangular and 11 m (36 ft) high, on two floors, with a large gallery and gable facing Beridarebansgatan, and could hold at least 1,100 people. The interior was like a large meeting hall without an altar, which was unnecessary as communion was not celebrated in the building. The design was to become a model for free church buildings in the country for many years.

Scott never won public approval, and attempts were made to ridicule him and his temperance advocacy. When it was learned that during a visit to North America he had portrayed the Swedes negatively, hostility was aroused, with attacks from newspapers and the clergy. On Palm Sunday, March 20, 1842, a mob stormed the church and Scott was forced to flee. Fearing greater violence, the authorities banned Scott from preaching and closed the church.

It remained closed until 1851 when Petrus Magnus Elmblad received permission to hold Bible lessons. In 1856 the Fosterländska stiftelsen för Evangelii befrämjande (later the Swedish Evangelical Mission) was founded under the leadership of Elmblad, Gustaf Fredrik Liljencrantz and Carl Olof Rosenius. The church was purchased in 1857 and named Betlehemskyrkan. Rosenius served as preacher of the church from 1857 to 1867 and had a great impact on Sweden's religious development during the 19th century.

According to the city planning proposals for the redevelopment of Norrmalm, the church was torn down to build the new Hötorgscity. A large group of cultural figures, architects and the Stockholm Beauty Council advocated the saving of the church and the adjoining Sergel House. However, the church foundation transferred the property to the real estate office on good terms and its fate was sealed. The last church service was held on 11 October 1953, and the building was demolished the same year Hötorgscity was constructed.

Remnants of the building material were reused in the mission church that was built in 1954 in Stuvsta in Huddinge.

== Bethlehem Church at Luntmakargatan ==
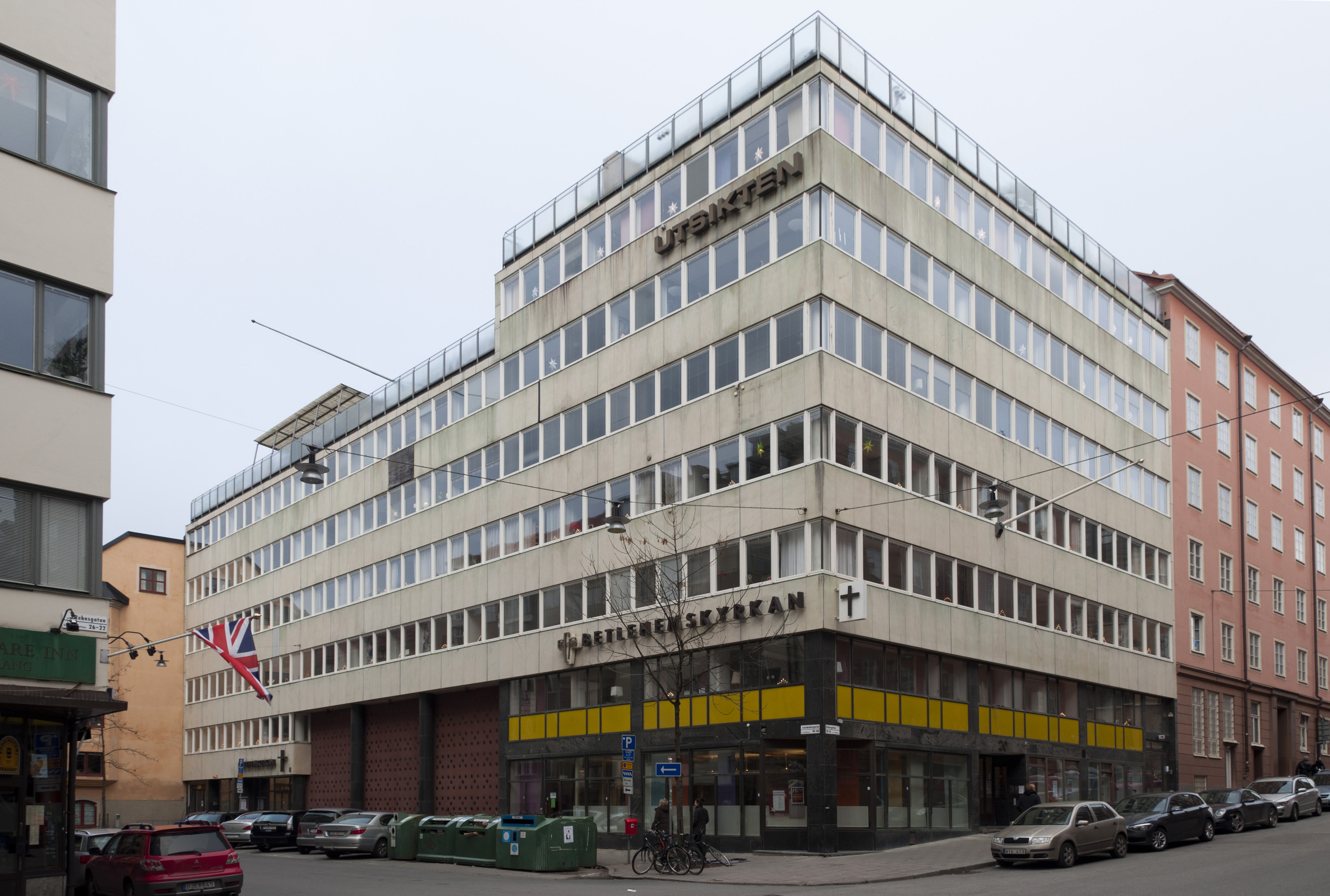
Bethlehem Church at Luntmakargatan

On 2 December 1956 the new church in the Stolmakaren block at the crossing of Luntmakargatan 82 and Rehnsgatan was consecrated. It was built according to plans by architect Rolf Hagstrand with floor and stairs made of white marble. The new church can seat approximately 400 people and has a pipe organ with 35 stops, three manuals and a positive, built by Starup & Søn, Copenhagen. The altar tapestry Den heliga staden ('the Holy City') was created by Sofia Widén. The pulpit from the old church on Sergelgatan is still in use today. Currently, Robert Ojala and Fetsum Natnael are the priests of the parish. The church holds weekly services in Swedish and Tigrinya.

The church is run cooperatively by the EFS Missionary Association in Bethlehem Church and EFS Central Sweden and is governed by a joint agreement.

== See also ==
- List of churches in Stockholm
