= John Hedberg =

Finnish journalist and politician

John Fredrik Hedberg

Member of the Parliament of Finland
- In office 1 August 1908 – 28 February 1910
- In office 1 March 1911 – 12 April 1916

Member of the Diet of Finland
- In office 1888–1888

Personal details
- Born: April 1, 1840 Paimio, Grand Duchy of Finland, Russian Empire
- Died: April 12, 1916 (aged 76)
- Parent: Fredrik Gabriel Hedberg
- Occupation: Forester, journalist, politician

John Fredrik Hedberg (1 April 1840 – 12 April 1916) was a Finnish forester, journalist and politician. He was born in Paimio, the son of Fredrik Gabriel Hedberg and the elder brother of Reinhold Hedberg. John Hedberg was a Member of the Diet of Finland in 1888 and a Member of the Parliament of Finland from 1908 to 1910 and again from 1911 to 1916, representing the Agrarian League.
