= Hedberg Maps =

Hedberg Maps, Inc. is a map publishing company based in Minneapolis, Minnesota. It was founded in 1994, although some of its maps were originally published under the name "Latitudes Map and Travel Publishers", as early as 1991. All operations are based in Minneapolis in the Northeast Arts District.

Hedberg Maps is best known for its maps about colleges, and for its rich body of work in the Minneapolis area. It primarily is a custom cartographic office with clients ranging nationwide from the Harvard Square Business Association to the Berkeley PathWanderers Association.
