= Jacob Otto Hoof =

Swedish priest (1768–1839)

- Born: 22 October 1768; Sätila, Sweden
- Died: 10 January 1839 (aged 70); Holsljunga, Sweden
- Burial place: Holsljunga Cemetery
- Occupation(s): Priest, revivalist preacher
- Known for: Hoofianism (movement)
- Church: Church of Sweden
- Ordained: 1795

Jacob Otto Hoof (22 October 1768 – 10 January 1839) was a Swedish Lutheran pastor and Christian revivalist preacher.

== Biography ==
Jacob Otto Hoof was the son of fältväbel Abraham Hoof and Anna Håkansdotter. He was born in Lida, Sätila, Västergötland province.

Hoof was ordained in Lund in 1795 and received his master's degree in Greifswald, Germany, in 1799. In 1821, he became the regular vicar of Svenljunga in the Diocese of Gothenburg after having served as a substitute for nearly two decades. He was a well-known revivalist preacher in the spirit of legalistic Pietism, albeit with elements of the blood and wound theology of the Moravian Church and a renunciation requirement reminiscent of Catholic mysticism. After his conversion in 1808, he became known as a revivalist preacher. He formed the movement known as Hoofianism, which was characterized by the asceticism of its members. In Sweden, its influence extended to the provinces of Halland, Västergötland and Småland; his postil, or collection of sermons was quite popular and he had significant influence in Norway and among Swedish American Lutherans.

Hoof was a resident of Floghult, Holsljunga, where people came from far and wide to hear his teachings from his so-called preaching stone, now considered one of the local landmarks. He died in Holsljunga in 1839. His grave is located in Holsljunga Cemetery, under a stone of considerable size.

The movement celebrated strict Sunday observance, simplicity of dress, and was led by laity who held conventicles (in violation of the Conventicle Act), though without separation from the Church of Sweden. Hoofianism was largely suppressed by Schartauanism and Nyevangelism, but his influence in the Diocese of Växjö was more lasting than in his home diocese.

== See also ==
- Shouter movement
- Läsare
