= Johann Jacob Rambach =

Lutheran theologian (1693–1735)

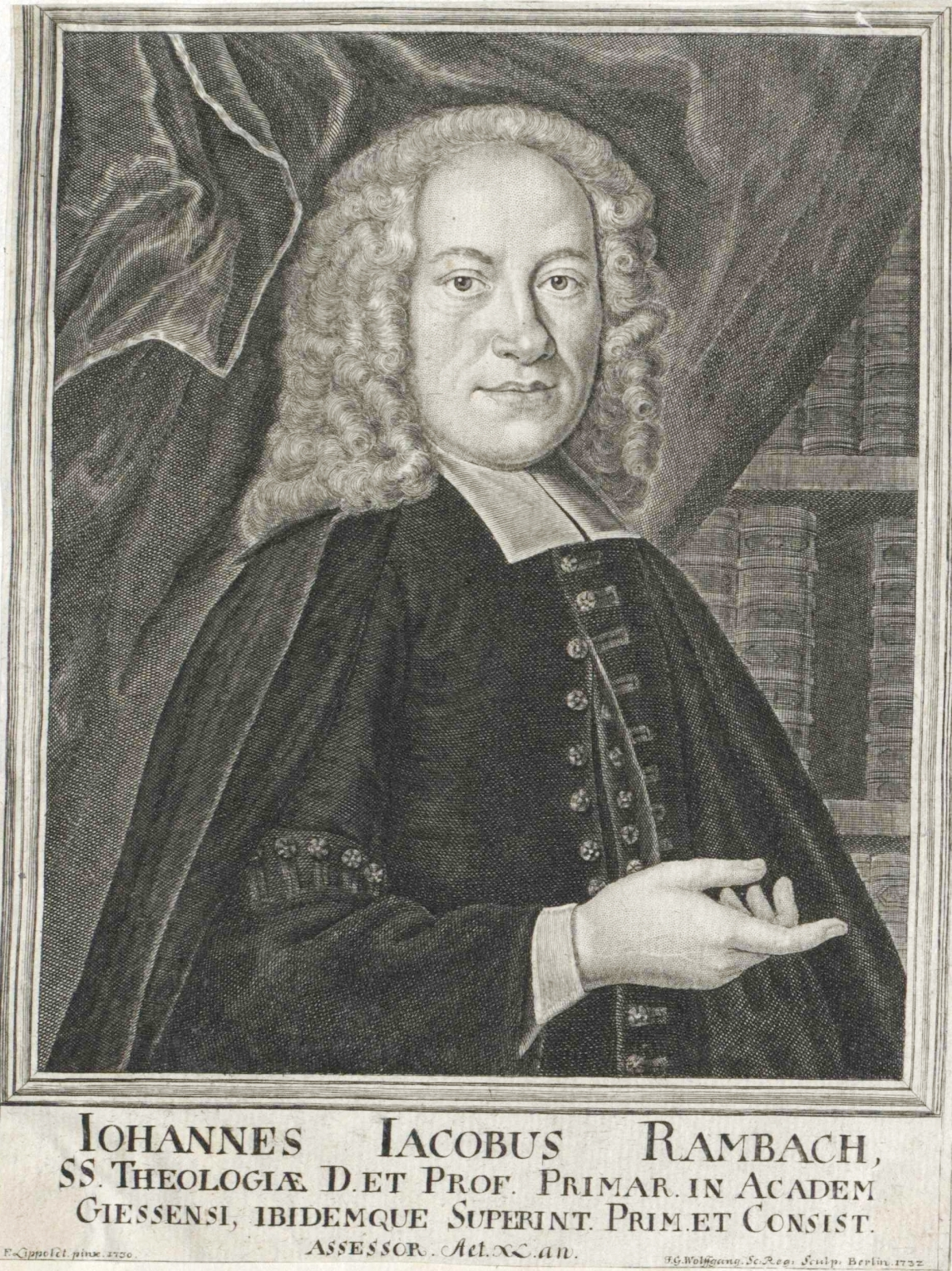
Johann Jakob Rambach, Engraving by Johann Georg Wolfgang

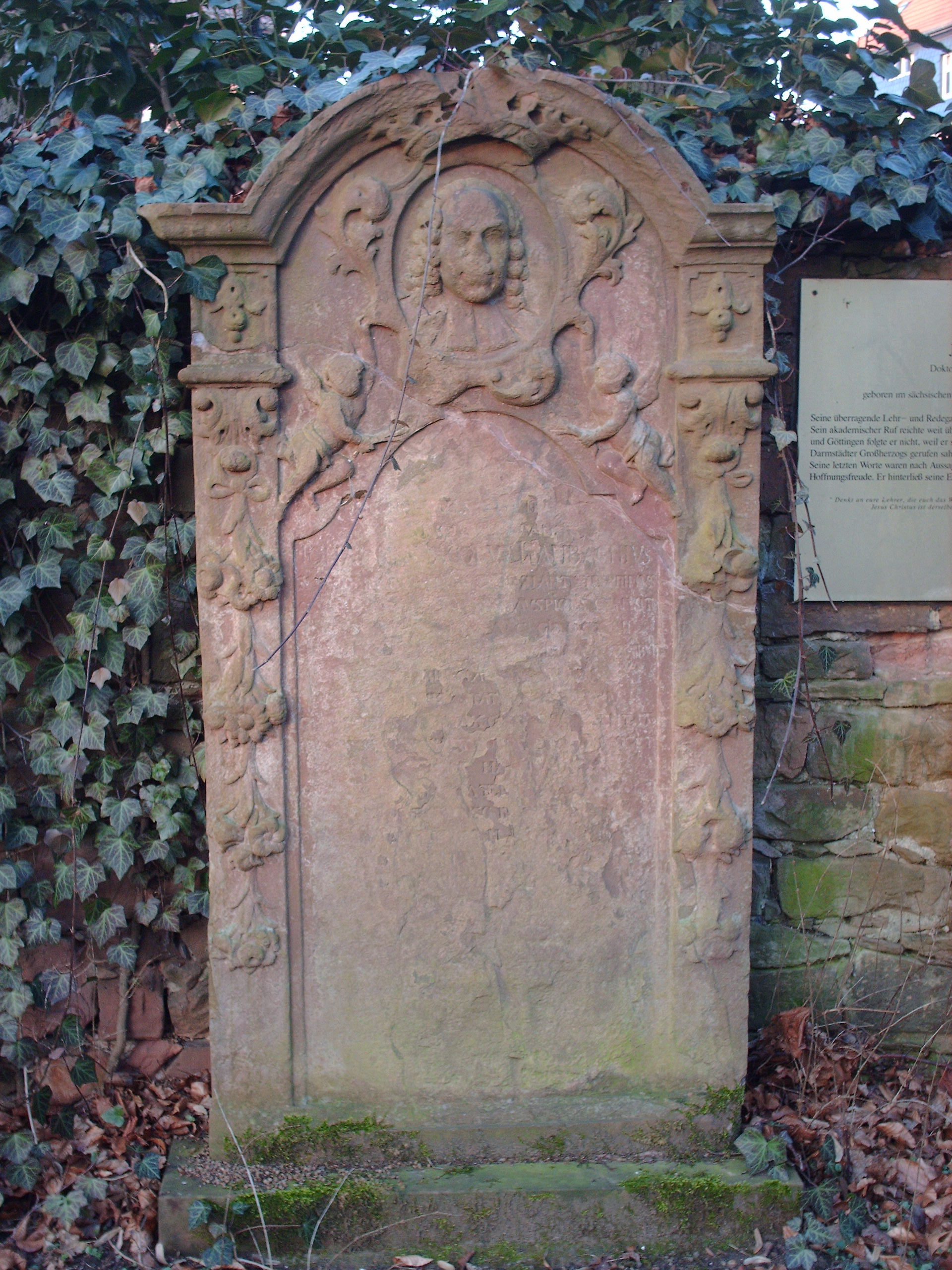
Rambach's grave in the old cemetery in Giessen

Johann Jacob Rambach, also Johann Jakob Rambach (born 1693 in Halle, Germany; died 1735 in Giessen) was a German Lutheran theologian and hymn writer.

== Life ==
Rambach was the son of Hans Jakob Rambach, a cabinet maker. For a time, he trained with his father, but then attended the University of Halle as a student of medicine, before becoming interested in theology. In 1723 he was appointed as an adjunct of the theological faculty, and in 1727, after August Hermann Francke's death, a professor. After earning a Doctor of Divinity in 1731, he was appointed the first professor of theology at University of Giessen. He was offered a professorship at the University of Göttingen, but decided to remain in Giessen. He died of fever 1735.

Rambach's hymns are still in use in German and some have passed into English use.

He married twice, first, in 1724 to a daughter of his colleague, Joachim Lange. After her death, he remarried in 1730. His daughter Johanna Dorothea married Conrad Caspar Griesbach, the father of Johann Jakob Griesbach. One of his other daughters married Johann Christian Dietz, who was also a professor at Giessen.

== Works ==
- Erbauliches Handbüchlein für Kinder. Leipzig 1733 (Digitalisat in the Digital Library of Mecklenburg-Vorpommern).
- Erbauliches Handbüchlein für Kinder. Gießen 1734, hg.v. Stefanie Pfister und Malte van Spankeren, EVA Leipzig 2014, ISBN 978-3-374-03754-4.
- Geistliche Poesien, in zweyen Theilen Gießen 1735, TU Darmstadt Digital Library
- Der Heil. Schrift Prof. Ord. in Halle Betrachtungen über das gantze Leiden Christi, Jm Oelgarten, vor dem geistlichen Gericht der Jüden, vor dem weltlichen Gericht Pilati und Herodis, und auf dem Berge Golgatha : Nach der Harmonischen Beschreibung der vier Evangelisten abgehandelt., Digital Library at University of Halle

== Links ==
- "Johann Jacob Rambach, Theologian and Writer". rism.info. Répertoire International des Sources Musicales. 2016-09-05.
- Literature by and about Johann Jacob Rambach in the German National Library catalogue
- Works by and about Johann Jacob Rambach in the Deutsche Digitale Bibliothek (German Digital Library)
- Werke von Johann Jakob Rambach in Project Gutenberg-DE
- Rambach, Johann Jakob. Hessische Biografie. In: Landesgeschichtliches Informationssystem Hessen (LAGIS). (Stand: 19 April 2020)
