= Läsare =

Pietistic movement in Sweden and Finland

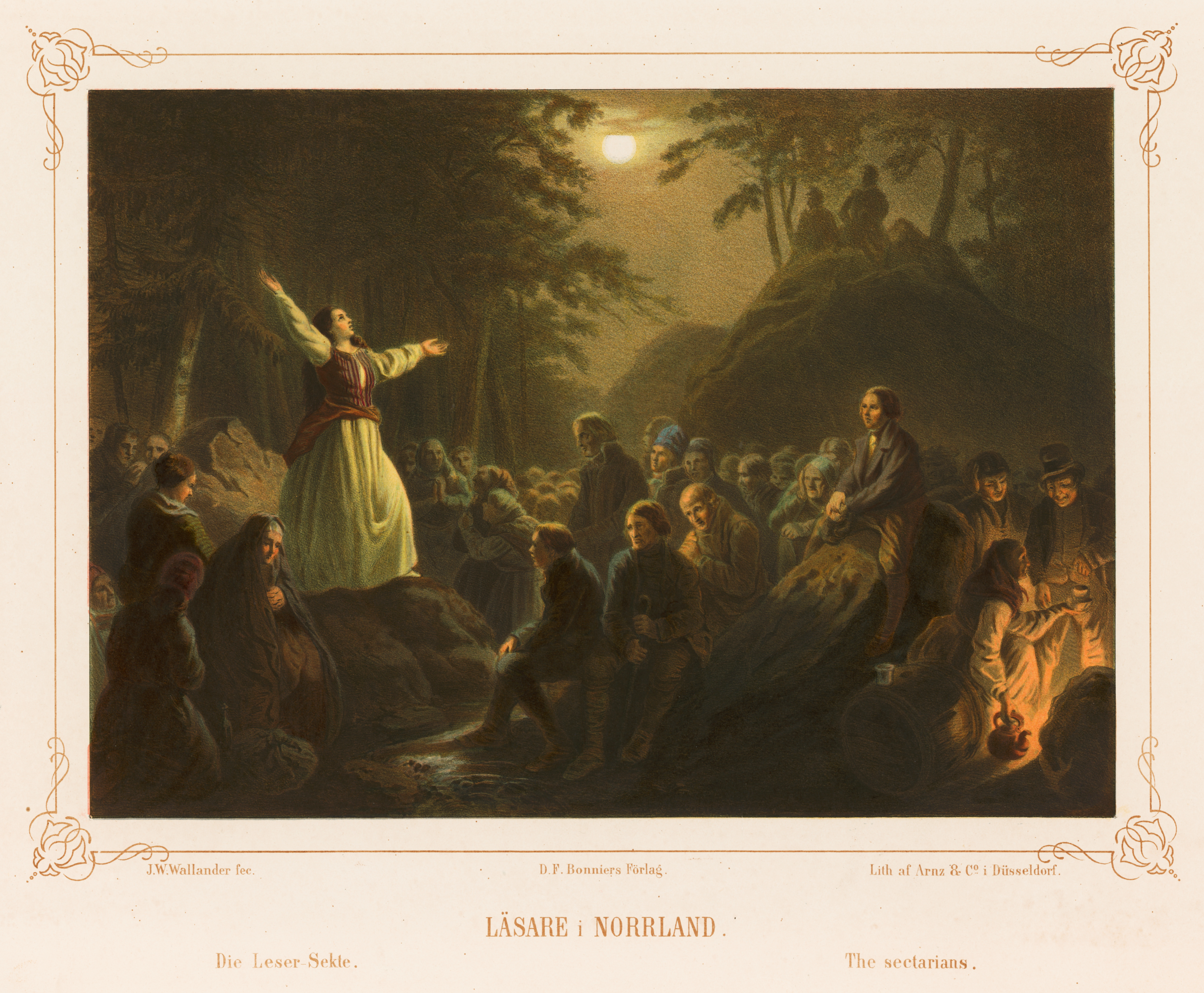
1855 painting by Josef Wilhelm Wallander of a Läsare woman preaching

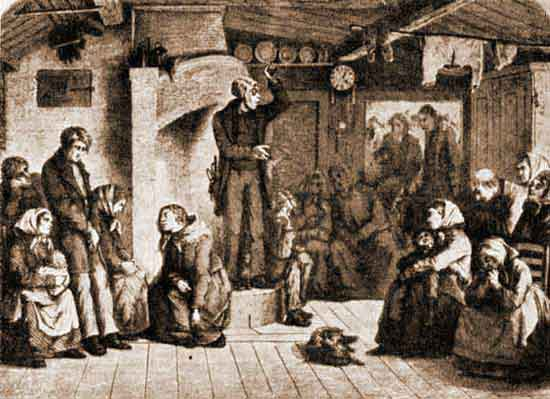
A colporter preaching and selling pamphlets to his target audience, consisting of Readers. Picture from Ny illustrerad tidning, latter 1800s.

Läsare (lit. 'reader') or the Reader movement was a Swedish Pietistic Christian revival movement of people who stressed the importance of reading (läseri), that is, reading the Bible and other Christian literature. It was influenced by both the Herrnhuters (Moravian Church) and the Methodists and has been described by scholar George M. Stephenson as a "second religious reformation in Sweden".

== Term and beliefs ==
There are several spiritual phenomena referred to by the term läsare. It was first used, pejoratively, in the 1750s for Lutherans who sought priests "for whom religion was an inner personal matter" and held individual prayer meetings despite the Conventicle Act banning individual religious gatherings without the leadership of a priest of the Church of Sweden. This gammalläseriet ('old reading') was influenced by the literalism of Pietism, especially in the 18th century. Lutheran priest Pehr Brandell was one influential revivalist preacher who grew up in an Old Reader environment.

The term also later came to refer to revivalists such as Mårten Thunberg, a priest whose meetings featured ecstatic fits and prophesying.

The 19th-century reader movement Nyläseriet ('new reading') from Piteå, however, was influenced by the 19th-century Nyevangelism ('New Evangelism') and free church movements with roots in the Moravian Church. Historian Gunnar Westin has stated that by 1840, "the terms läsare and Methodist were practically interchangeable".

Priest Frederik Thorelius noted the läsare could only attend church infrequently due to the distance. They were people living in rural areas, far from the high churches of the state church organization, regularly holding meetings to study the Bible and Christian material, and commonly abstaining from vices such as drinking, dancing, and swearing.

The meetings were described by Thorelius:

...they frequent these meetings on Sabbath evenings, and also occasionally on the week days after working hours. The Bible is read as well as other religious books written by Luther, Arndt, Roose, Rambach, &c. No one person is leader, but each who has any edifying matter to advance is at liberty to give his thoughts and experiences, which it is desired should be done in the most simple and artless manner.

— Frederik Thorelius, Upplysningar om Läseriet. [Illustrations of Pietism], The London Quarterly Review. Vol. XXXII. p. 302

However, as also noted in the London Quarterly Review in 1869, there was a "great diversity in sentiment and practice obtained amongst Läsare." As another book states regarding Readers such as Gerhard Gerhardsson and the use of literature, "the hitherto customary books of edification were rejected, and only the Bible and Luther's writings were adhered to, though only as much of the great Reformer's utterances was adopted as suited the association's antinomian form of confession."

== Norrland Reader movement ==
The Norrland region and its revival were to play a significant part in the country's religious history. Originally an orthodox Lutheran movement, the New Reader movement began in Piteå, gaining more Pietist and Moravian influence by the late 1700s and reaching its peak between 1810 and 1850. 1805 is described as a key moment, when soldier Erik Stålberg "who, instead of the older Readers recognizing no other order of salvation than a thorough conversion, a living faith and a daily sanctification, claimed that the saving faith could be found even in those in whose hearts the love of the world and sin were still unbroken, and declared the law not further binding on those who had been justified by faith." By the 1810s, the movement had spread from Piteå to Luleå, Neder-Kalix, Skellefteå, and Arvidsjaur. Priest Anders Rosenius, father of Pietist preacher Carl Olof Rosenius, was part of the movement at this time.

Among its leaders were Pehr Brandell (1781–1841), Olof Palmgren (1783–1814), Anders Larsson in Norrlångträsk (1794–1876) and Gerhard Gerhardsson (1792–1878). Larsson was known to express himself forcefully, stating:

He who believes what the priests teach will surely fall into hell!

— Anders Larsson, quoted by M. J. Ahnqvist in Nyläsarväckelsen 1815–1923

The movement's leaders faced problems with the authorities. Larsson was threatened with exile and the death penalty for his preaching. Palmgren stood trial in 1812 and was forced to pay a fine for violating the Conventicle Act. In 1818, the Readers filed complaints to the diocese about the clergy in Skellefteå. Priest Olof Hambræus was instructed by Bishop Erik Abraham Almqvist to meet with them, allowing them to ask questions. Despite his lack of official schooling, Gerhardsson brought a statement of faith he had written expounding on the New Readers' beliefs, consisting of 22 articles on 24 pages, based on the format of the Augsburg Confession. Hambræus in the end sided with his colleagues. Almqvist, while politically supporting fines for the Readers, maintained a conciliatory tone and opposed stronger measures against them.

Larsson and Gerhardsson stood trial in 1819 in the Skellefteå Church (Skellefteå landsförsamlings kyrka) for rebellious activity and disobedience to priests, bishops and the service order, and for violating the Conventicle Act. The movement was investigated at the king's request by Josua Sylvander, Supreme Court justice and Moravian. Like Bishop Almqvist, he took a conciliatory tone, speaking with the movement's leaders. Due to Sylvander's efforts, starting in 1820 they were again allowed to assemble for devotions on Sundays and holidays; however, their own interpretation of the biblical text was not allowed. On 9 January 1822, King Charles XIV John decreed that the provisions of the Conventicle Act were no longer to apply to the Readers in Västerbotten. As long as they did not gather during public worship services, they were allowed to hold their own devotions and individual meetings.

Starting in the 1820s, the Readers began using the Moravian hymnals Sions sånger and Sions nya sånger, initially smuggled into the country in the late 1700s. The former contained a number of hymns by Lars Thorstensson Nyberg and Johan Kahl and the latter by the controversial Anders Carl Rutström and Magnus Brynolf Malmstedt, among others. The books were partly in opposition to the state church's hymnal and were commonly used by conventicle groups at the time. The hymns themselves had a "popular, emotionally saturated" tone, which Gerhardsson felt preached a false gospel. Gerhardsson would later distance himself from Moravian influence and become a follower of priest Henric Schartau.

Among the Readers, women spoke and preached. Maria Elisabeth (known as Maja-Lisa) Söderlund was one of the women who was widely known in northern Västerbotten. She traveled from town to town, often reciting Luther's sermons from memory. She was a close friend of Carl Olof Rosenius, who would later become one of the leaders of the Evangeliska Fosterlands-Stiftelsen (EFS, Swedish Evangelical Mission), and had a great impact on his spiritual development. A number of spiritual sayings and advice in his book Nytt och Gammalt från Nådens Rike, eller Några Guds ord och Wishetens goda ordspråk Samlade af C. O. Rosenius 1838 are attributed to her, as well as an excerpt printed in the February 1844 edition of his publication Pietisten.

== Reader movements in other countries ==
Pietism spread throughout the Germanic-speaking part of Europe. The term reader, however, seems to be specifically Nordic. In Norway, the word often denotes a specific reader movement, the Haugean movement. Laestadianism has its roots in the Reader movement as well through Pehr Brandell's preaching.

== Legacy ==
The Reader movement's rebellion and free thought have a connection with the later labor movement. A dramatic performance by Greger Ottosson entitled Stor-Brodren, about Reader preachers Gerhard Gerhardsson and Anders Larsson, was presented in 2011. Ottosson and others have noted that the movement, with its right to preach and interpret for oneself, paved the way for today's democratic Sweden.

== See also ==
- Anna Johansdotter Norbäck – female religious leader influenced by the Readers
- Fredrik Gabriel Hedberg – Finnish priest with related Hedbergianism movement
- Eric Jansson – Reader preacher who founded a utopian sect in the United States
- Lars Levi Laestadius – founder of Laestadianism, connected to the Readers through his mother
- Karin Olofsdotter – connected to Mårten Thunberg's sect
- Henric Schartau – priest whose works influenced the movement
- Shouter movement
- Biblical literalism
