= Fredrik Gabriel Hedberg =

Finnish Lutheran pastor and vicar

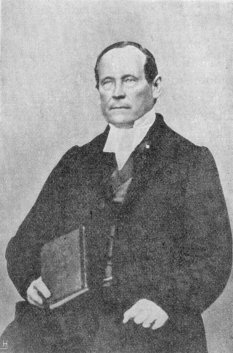
- Fredrik Gabriel Hedberg in 1906. Credit: K. O. Lindeqvist
- Born: 15 July 1811; Saloinen, Finland
- Died: 19 August 1893 (aged 82); Kimito, Finland
- Occupation: Evangelical Lutheran Church of Finland priest
- Known for: Finnish evangelical revival movement

Fredrik Gabriel Hedberg (15 July 1811 – 19 August 1893) was a Finnish Lutheran pastor and vicar. He was a Neo-Lutheran theologian, a prominent figure in the Finnish evangelical revival movement and a leader of confessional Lutheranism in Finland.

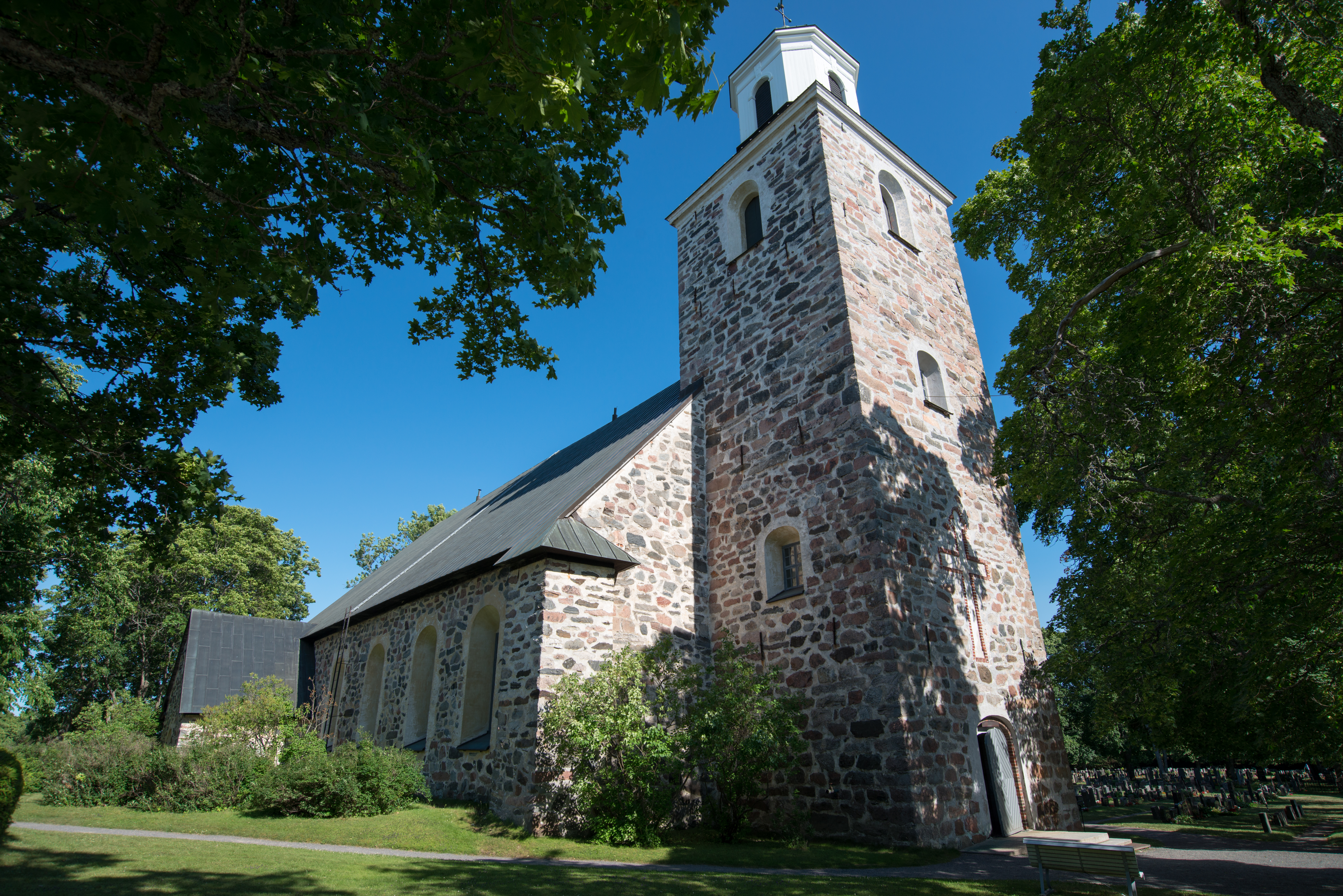
Kimito Church in Kimito

== Biography ==
Fredrik Hedberg was born in Saloinen, now a part of Raahe in the North Ostrobothnia region of Western Finland. His father was a sheriff and both his grandfathers had been priests in Ostrobothnia. Hedberg earned a master's of philosophy and theology from the Royal Academy of Turku. He was ordained a Lutheran pastor in 1834 and became curate in Siuntio, then in Lohja. Dating from 1836, he had supported the Pietist revivalist movement led by Savonian farmer and lay preacher Paavo Ruotsalainen. Soon Hedberg became one of the leaders of this movement in southern Finland. The rationalist diocesan chapter begun to dislike Hedberg's activity because of his Pietism and he was transferred first to Paimio in 1838 and again in 1840 as prison chaplain in Oulu. In 1842 he became temporary curate in Replot and in 1843 parish pastor in Pöytyä. He started a short-lived and somewhat polemical publication, Evangelisten, in 1849, but its publishing was taken over by Anders Wiberg in 1851 and Per Palmqvist served as editor until it was discontinued at the end of the year. In 1853 he became vicar in Kaarina and in 1862 vicar at Kimito Church in Kimito.

Gradually, Hedberg discovered Lutheranism without any "order of salvation" from Martin Luther's postil and abandoned Pietism including the books of Arndt and Spener among others, which had formerly been his spiritual authorities. He began to read Martin Luther, Stephan Praetorius and the Book of Concord. He wrote a devotional commentary to the 1st chapter of the Epistle to the Ephesians, "The Doctrine of Faith unto Salvation" (Eng. transl. 1998), which focused on justification by faith alone, being full of joy about salvation. Hedberg now began a controversy against Pietism, using the works of Johann Gerhard, Andreas Gottlob Rudelbach, Wilhelm Löhe, Gottfried Thomasius, Gottlieb Christoph Adolf von Harless and Catenhusen. His main writing in this controversy is Pietism och Christendom (1845) where he criticised Philipp Jacob Spener, Rambach, Johann Philipp Fresenius, Anders Nohrborg and Henric Schartau. In 1855 Hedberg published a book against the teaching of the Baptists in response to the writings of Anders Wiberg.

Hedberg published several religious newspapers for his readers. He kept reading neo-Lutheran theology, Martin Luther and evangelical Roman Catholics Martin Boos and Johannes Gossner. He organised a fundraising as a gift for persecuted Old Lutherans of Prussia. Also in Sweden he had many readers associated with Carl Olof Rosenius, including Baptist pioneer brothers Per Palmqvist and Gustaf Palmquist. His theological influence was such that the Lutheran Evangelical Association of Finland was founded in 1873 to foster and maintain confessional Lutheran revival in Finland. In later years Hedberg focused more on sacraments and on the mystical union with Christ. At Kimito, the Eucharist was celebrated every Sunday during Hedberg's time. As celebrant he also always wore the chasuble.

Hedberg died in 1893 in Kimito.

== Selected works ==
- Varningsord i anledning af pietismen i Finland samt deraf föranledda söndringar (1841)
- Pietism och christendom (1845)
- Verklärans vederläggning och evangelii försvar I−III (1847−1851)
- Sändebref om Christus och församlingen (1850)
- F. G. Hedbergs bekännelse och evangelii försvar (1851)
- Den enda salighetens väg (1851)
- Väktare-rop eller andra sändebrefvet (1852)
- Ett ord i sinom tid (1855)
- Baptismens vederläggning och det heliga dopets försvar (1855)
- Inledning till vår kyrkas bekännelseskrifter (1879)

== Other sources ==
- Wolfgang Amadeus Schmidt (1951) Fredrik Gabriel Hedberg : den evangeliska rörelsens i Finland grundare (Förbundet för Svenskt Församlingsarbete i Finland)
- Esa Santakari, Vanhan Hedbergin sakramenttimystiikka. Elevatis Oculis, studia mystica in honorem Seppo A. Teinonen. Annals of the Finnish Society for Missiology and Ecumenics, 42, 1984. ISBN 951-95206-7-8
