= Johann Arndt =

German Lutheran theologian (1555–1621)

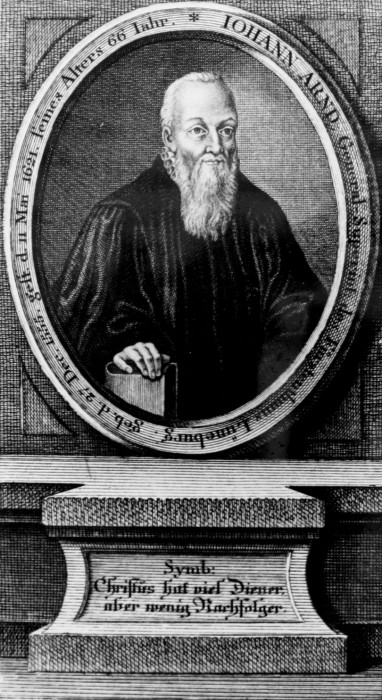
- Johann Arndt
- Born: 27 December 1555; Edderitz near Ballenstedt, Anhalt-Köthen, Holy Roman Empire
- Died: 11 May 1621 (aged 65); Celle, Holy Roman Empire
- Occupations: Theologian, Writer

Johann Arndt (or Arnd; 27 December 1555 – 11 May 1621) was a German Lutheran theologian and mystic who wrote several influential books of devotional Christianity. Although reflective of the period of Lutheran Orthodoxy, he is seen as a forerunner of Pietism, a movement within Lutheranism that gained strength in the late 17th century.

== Biography ==
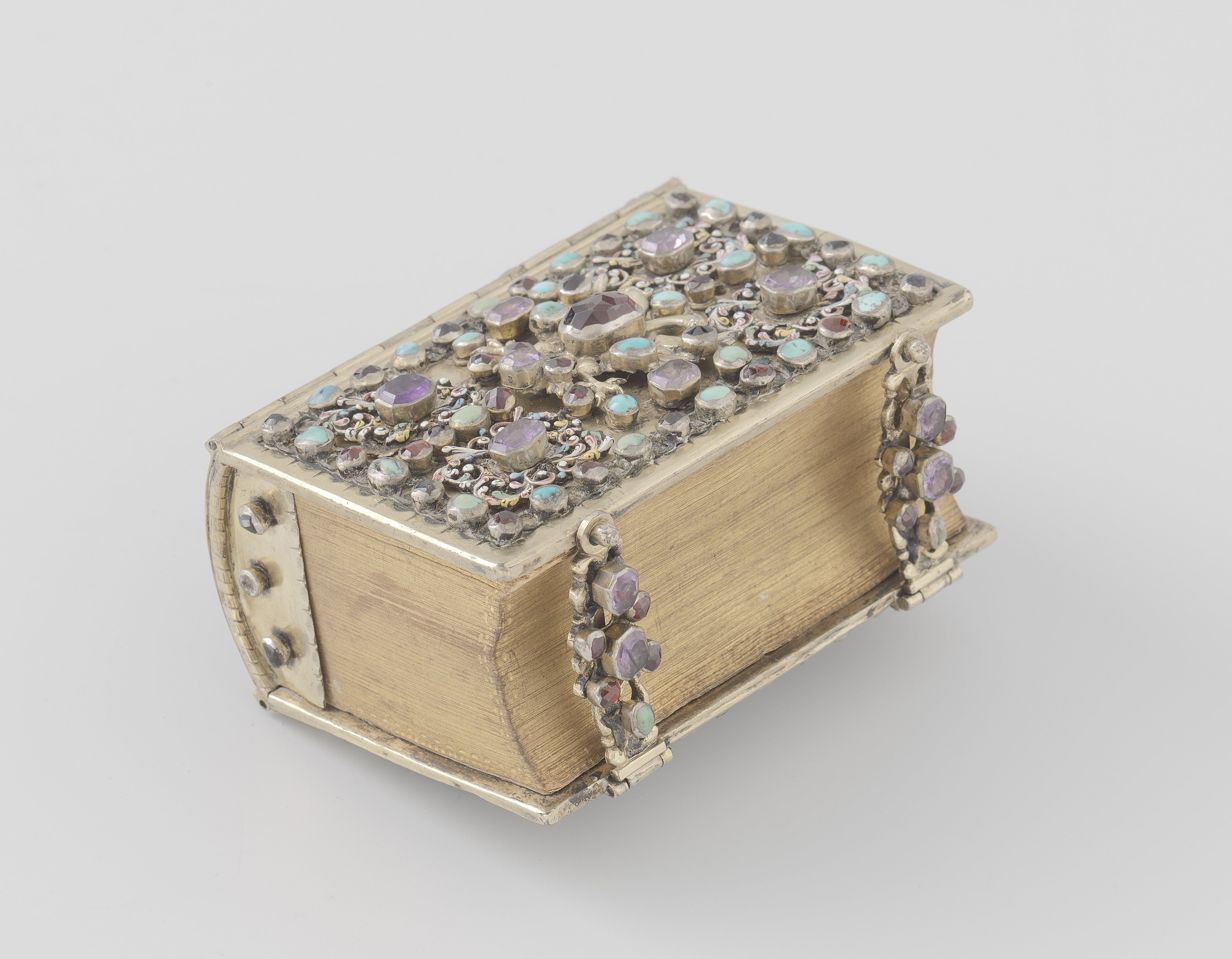
17th-century exemplar of Paradiesgärtlein bound in gilded silver on wood. Rijksmuseum

He was born in Edderitz near Ballenstedt, in Anhalt-Köthen, and studied in several universities. He was at Helmstedt in 1576 and at Wittenberg in 1577. At Wittenberg the crypto-Calvinist controversy was then at its height, and he took the side of Melanchthon and the crypto-Calvinists. He continued his studies in Strasbourg, under the professor of Hebrew, Johannes Pappus (1549–1610), a zealous Lutheran, the crown of whose life's work was the forcible suppression of Calvinistic preaching and worship in the day, and who had great influence over him.

In Basel, again, he studied theology under Simon Sulzer (1508–1585), a broad-minded divine of Lutheran sympathies, whose aim was to reconcile the churches of the Helvetic and Wittenberg confessions. In 1581 he went back to Ballenstedt, but was soon recalled to active life by his appointment to the pastorate at Badeborn in 1583. After some time his Lutheran tendencies aroused the anger of the authorities, who were of the Reformed Church. Consequently, in 1590 he was deposed for refusing to remove the pictures from his church and discontinue the use of exorcism at baptism. He found an asylum in Quedlinburg (1590). However, he was very unpopular with the townspeople, and for that reason was transferred to St Martin's church at Brunswick in 1599. He later worked in Eisleben, and from 1611 until his death in 1621 he was general superintendent in Celle. Among his last words were "Now I have overcome all."

Arndt's fame rests on his writings. These were mainly of a mystical and devotional kind, and were inspired by St Bernard, Johannes Tauler and Thomas à Kempis. His principal work, Wahres Christentum (book 1: 1605; books 1-4: 1606–1610) i.e. "True Christianity", which has been translated into most European languages, has served as the foundation of many books of devotion, both Roman Catholic and Protestant. Arndt here dwells upon the mystical union between the believer and Christ, and endeavours, by drawing attention to Christ's life in His people, to correct the purely forensic side of the reformation theology, which paid almost exclusive attention to Christ's death for His people.

Like Luther, Arndt was very fond of the little anonymous book, Theologia Germanica. He published an edition of it and called attention to its merits in a special preface. After Wahres Christentum, Arndt's best-known work is Paradiesgärtlein aller christlichen Tugenden, which was published in 1612. Both these books have been translated into English: Paradiesgärtlein with the title the Garden of Paradise, and Wahres Christentum as True Christianity. Several of his sermons are published in R. Nesselmann's Buch der Predigten (1858). A collected edition of his works was published in Leipzig and Görlitz in 1734.

Arndt was held in very high repute by the German Pietists. The founder of Pietism, Philipp Jakob Spener, repeatedly called attention to him and his writings, and even went so far as to compare him with Plato. So important was Arndt's influence on the early Pietists that some scholars have even called him the true founder of the movement.

His impact in Sweden includes Jesper Swedberg and Peter Lorenz Sellergren.

== Veneration ==
In 2022, Johann Ardt was officially added to the Episcopal Church liturgical calendar along with Jacob Boehme with a feast day on 11 May.
