= Andreas Fernholm =

Swedish priest and free church leader

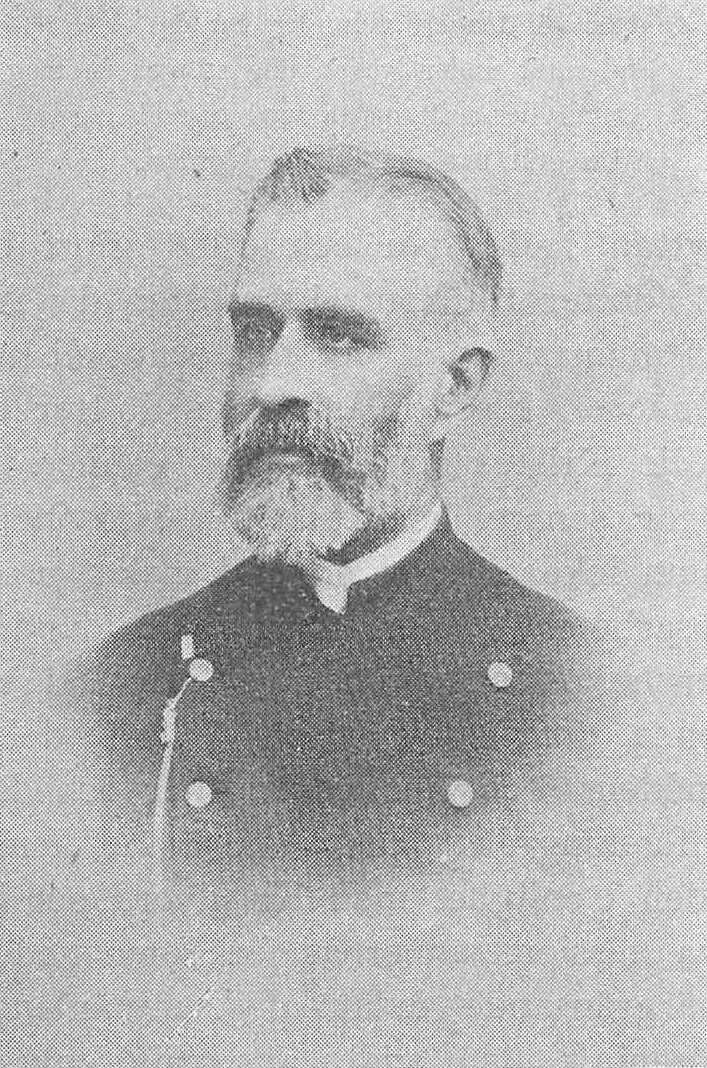
- Born: 7 May 1840; Sör-Hörende, Västmanland, Sweden
- Died: 9 May 1892 (aged 52); Stockholm, Sweden
- Occupation(s): Priest, free-church leader, hymnwriter
- Spouse: Gerda Fernholm née Lignell (m. 1871)

Andreas Fernholm (7 May 1840 – 9 May 1892) was a priest in the Church of Sweden, later leader of the Baptist Union of Sweden, teacher for the Mission Covenant Church of Sweden and hymnwriter.

== Biography ==
Andreas Fernholm was born in 1840 in Sör-Hörende, Västmanland, son of crofter Anders Persson and Anna Persdotter. After support from vicar I. A. Nordblad in Västerfärnebo, he studied at Västerås högre elementarläroverk, graduated in Uppsala in May 1863, began studying theology in Uppsala in October 1864 and was ordained on 30 November 1866 by Archbishop Henrik Reuterdahl. Through his teacher in Uppsala, Carl Axel Torén, he came into contact with the Swedish Evangelical Mission (Evangeliska Fosterlands-Stiftelsen and became good friends with founder Hans Jakob Lundborg, in whose home he celebrated Christmas 1865. During the summer of 1868 he met Paul Petter Waldenström and Carl Johan Nyvall – two other prominent leaders of the Nyevangelism ('new evangelism') revival and distributed communion with them outside of church gatherings.

In May 1870, Fernholm was given leave of absence from his priestly duties to work as director of the Mission School in Kristinehamn, a school for future preachers and missionaries run by the Värmland Ansgar Association, and worked closely with Erik Jakob Ekman there. The two worked as editors for the publication Förbundet. During his time in Kristinehamn, he traveled extensively in Värmland and Örebro County, preaching in churches and serving communion associations with communion. In 1871, he married Gerda Andreetta Lignell (1849–1914), daughter of provost Anders Lignell and Regina Matilda Poignant.

After two years, he left his post and resigned from the priesthood in the Church of Sweden (and was dismissed from the priesthood on 26 May 1872) and was baptized a Baptist in Göta älv.

With Fernholm's resignation, the communion associations in the Värmland Ansgar Association and the Örebro County Ansgar Association lost access to a priest who could serve them with communion, and many of them took the step of appointing a layman to lead communion, which was illegal at the time. This contributed to the formation of the Swedish Mission Covenant, later the Mission Covenant Church of Sweden, in 1878.

As a Baptist, Fernholm founded a new mission school, became a district chairman, and published a periodical called Tidens Tecken ('The Sign of the Times'). He served as assistant pastor at Gothenburg Baptist Church with Teodor Trued Truvé.

When the dispute broke out over Waldenström's subjective doctrine of atonement, Fernholm sided with Waldenström. This made it difficult for him to remain within the Baptist movement and in 1880 he joined the Swedish Mission Covenant led by Waldenström. Fernholm called for Christian unity, stating "The Bible knows nothing of Lutherans or Calvinists or Wesleyans but much about Christians who believe in Christ and are buried with him through baptism to death."

Fernholm died in Stockholm in 1892.

Fernholm is also known as a hymnwriter.

== Hymns ==
- "Det är saligt på Jesus få tro" in Psalmer och Sånger, no. 263 (1877)
- "Du Herre kär, min herde är", composed 1870 (Svenska Missionsförbundets sångbok, 1951)
- "O Fader, sänd din Ande neder" in Psalmer och Sånger no. 425 (1884), Svenska Missionsförbundets sångbok, 1920, no. 496 and no. 505 in the Örebro Mission's Musik till Andliga sångar, 1936 (3rd edition).
