= Carl Boberg =

Swedish poet, preacher and government official

Carl Gustav Boberg
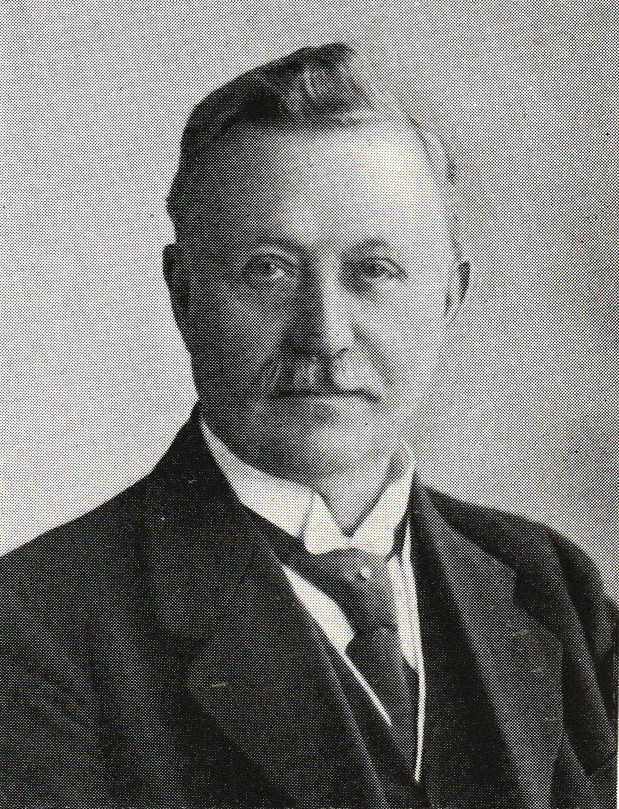
- Born: 16 August 1859; Mönsterås parish, Kalmar County, Sweden
- Died: 7 January 1940 (aged 80); Kalmar Cathedral parish, Kalmar County, Sweden
- Occupations: Poet, preacher, writer, member of the Riksdag

Signature
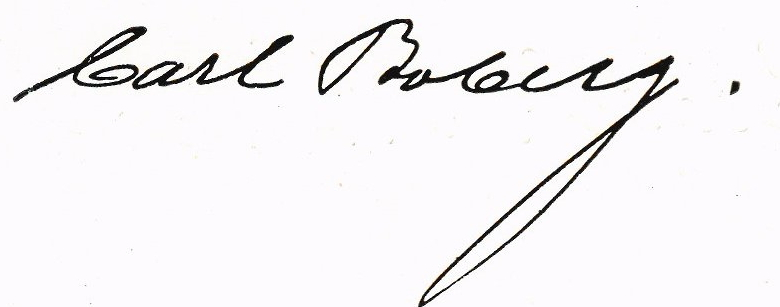

Carl Gustav Boberg (16 August 1859 – 7 January 1940) was a Swedish poet, preacher, government official and member of parliament, best known for writing the Swedish-language poem "O Store Gud" ('O Great God') from which the English language-hymn "How Great Thou Art" is derived.

== Biography ==
=== Upbringing and work in the free church movement ===
Born in Mönsterås, Kalmar County, in Småland, Boberg was the son of carpenter Nils Petter Jonsson Boberg and Hedvig Gustava Jonsdotter. The religious revival movements of the time strongly affected him as a young man. He worked briefly as a sailor and served as a lay minister in the Mission Covenant Church of Sweden. Boberg studied at the church's school in Kristinehamn from 1879 to 1882 and was then a preacher for the Mönsterås Mission Association from 1882 to 1889. However, he earned his living mainly as a sloyd teacher. Boberg was also the editor of the free-church magazine Sanningsvittnet ('Witness of the Truth') from 1889 to 1916. He published his own books and poetry through the magazine's publishing house, and bought the magazine in 1894. He was a preacher at Flora Church from 1890 to 1892 and Immanuel Church from 1892 to 1909, both in Stockholm. Boberg was a member of the board of the Mission Covenant Church of Sweden from 1897 to 1902, but resigned so as not to have to take a stand between its two leaders, Paul Peter Waldenström and Jakob (E. J.) Ekman. The latter was Boberg's former teacher at the mission school.

=== Political roles and views ===
Boberg served in the Riksdag's Första kammare (upper house of Parliament) from 1912 to 1931. From 1921, he was also a state auditor. Unlike many of the free church leaders who were free-thinkers and liberals, Boberg moved in an increasingly conservative direction and ran for the General Electoral Association (Allmänna valmansförbundet, today's Moderate Party). In the parliamentary presentation material published on the occasion of the 100th anniversary of women's suffrage, it is stated that Boberg argued against women's suffrage. He is reported to have said that 'women, if elected as members of parliament, would obscure the view in the meeting rooms with their wide-brimmed hats.' Moreover, he argued, the sharp hatpins were a weapon, so women with hatpins were unthinkable as parliamentarians."

=== Writings ===
He published more than 60 poems, hymns, and gospel songs, (Note: Technically a gospel song differs from a hymn in that the gospel song invariably has a refrain and customarily (though not always) uses a less stately cadence. The gospel song, as a musical form, spread widely in Protestantism during the 19th century and to a lesser extent in Roman Catholicism; Eastern Orthodox churches largely continue to adhere to chants in the worship per se. Unless altered considerably, O STORE GUD and "How Great Thou Art" form a gospel song. "Amazing Grace" (when sung to its own familiar tune, which lacks a refrain) is a hymn.) including a collaboration with Swedish hymnist Lina Sandell. Of his works, "O store Gud" ('O Great God'), upon which "How Great Thou Art" is based, the best known. The song is a natural romantic description of God's creation, which in each chorus ends with the songwriter wanting to cry out that God is great. It was written after Boberg experienced a thunderstorm at the Kalmar Strait.

Boberg is represented in the Church of Sweden's fourth hymnal, Den svenska psalmboken (1986) with three works, ("O store Gud", "Det susar genom livets strid", and "Den stunden i Getsemane") and in other hymnals such as the Swedish-American Herde-Rösten (1892), Emil Gustafson's Hjärtesånger (1895), the Swedish Evangelical Mission's hymnal supplement (1986) and the Bibeltrogna Vänner hymnal Lova Herren (1987). He is abundantly represented in the Mission Covenant Church's 1920 hymnal Svenska Missionsförbundets sångbok. Several of his songs are also published for children in the Sunday school hymnal Svensk söndagsskolsångbok (1908).

=== Family ===
On 5 January 1884 Boberg married Anna Maria Elisabet Pettersson. On 23 November 1915 he married Selma Charlotta Elisabet Ydrén.

== Legacy ==
For his literary output, Boberg was awarded the Litteris et Artibus medal in 1916. Boberg's writings have been freely available for publication since 1 January 2011.

For his political work, Carl Boberg was made a Knight of the Order of Vasa in 1917 and of the Order of the Polar Star in 1923.

Carl Boberg is also the name of a Kustpilen regional train, which operates the Stångådal line between Linköping and Kalmar.
