= Otto Magnus von Stackelberg =

Otto Magnus von Stackelberg may refer to:

== People ==
- Otto Magnus von Stackelberg (1704–1765), Baltic-German statesman and military officer
- Otto Magnus von Stackelberg (1736–1800), Baltic-German diplomat of the Russian Empire
- Otto Magnus von Stackelberg (1786–1837), Baltic-German archaeologist, painter and art historian
- Otto Magnus von Stackelberg (1867–1947), Baltic-German genealogist, administrative lawyer and author

== See also ==
- Stackelberg (disambiguation)
