= Swedish Baptists =

Swedish Baptists (or Scandinavian Baptists) are Baptists that trace their origins to Radical Pietism (that disassociated from Lutheranism or partially originated from an adjacent non-Lutheran tradition), the Mission Friends movement, and the Pietist or Pietistic Lutheran tradition of Lutheranism.

== Denominations ==
- Converge (United States), formerly the Baptist General Conference
- Baptist General Conference of Canada
- Baptist Union of Sweden
- Evangelical Free Church in Sweden (Baptist)
- Finnish Baptist movement
- Swedish Baptist Union of Finland
- Ethiopian Kale Heywet Church

== Individual churches ==
- Central Church (Sioux Falls, South Dakota)
- Swedish Baptist Church (Davenport, Iowa)

== See also ==
- Conventicle Act (Sweden)
- Assemblies of God in Brazil
