= Erik August Skogsbergh =

Swedish American preacher (1850–1939)

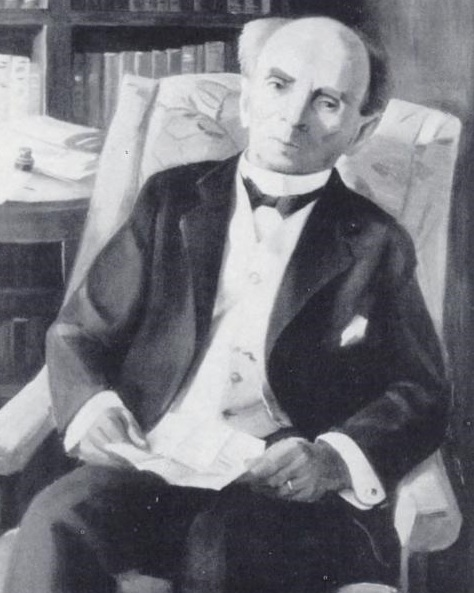
- Born: 30 June 1850; Älgå parish, Värmland, Sweden
- Died: 31 October 1939 (aged 89); Minneapolis, Minnesota, USA
- Occupation(s): Mission Friends preacher, writer

Erik August Skogsbergh (30 June 1850 – 31 October 1939) was a Swedish American Mission Friends revival preacher and lyricist. His works are represented in the Swedish Salvation Army's hymnal Frälsningsarméns sångbok 1990 (FA). For a time, he published Minneapolis Veckoblad. He has been described as the "Swedish Moody".

== Biography ==
Erik August Skogsbergh was born in Älgå parish, Värmland, Sweden, the son of Per Skogsbergh, a mill worker and later a manufacturer, and Anna Eriksdotter. He attended a folk school, then received private instruction from the vicar in Älgå parish and then attended school in Arvika for several years. From the age of fourteen to eighteen he was a clerk and traveling salesman for his father's nail factory in Skyberg, Älgå parish.

In 1869 he experienced a religious crisis and the following year spent a semester at the Swedish Mission Covenant school in Kristinehamn. After a period as a preacher, he taught in 1872–1873 at Ahlsborg's mission school near Vetlanda. As a deep admirer of preacher Paul Petter Waldenström, he began his own preaching activities. From 1874 to 1876 he was a preacher in the Jönköping Mission Society and during this time traveled to various parts of Småland and Västergötland. His exceptional oratory skills attracted large audiences and he gave rise to several revivals.

In 1876 he was called to preach at the Swedish Mission Friends in Chicago and was active there until 1884. There, too, his great influence on the listeners was evident, the congregation grew, and in 1877 he became pastor of the Tabernacle Church in South Chicago. That year, he traveled to Minnesota, holding large revival meetings. The Minneapolis Tribune described Skogsbergh, stating "Though unheralded and almost unknown, he has created an interest among the people of his own nationality unparalleled in this community". At one of Skogsbergh's revivals, musician Andrew L. Skoog had a conversion experience. The two would go on to work together, with Skogsbergh known as the "Swedish Moody" and Skoog the "Swedish Sankey". In 1881, they published the song collection Evangelii basun (part 1).

Skogsbergh attempted to unite the different factions of the Mission movement, the Ansgar Synod and the Evangelical Lutheran Mission Synod. In 1884 he moved to Minneapolis, where he founded a school the same year to teach new Swedish emigrants English and business skills as well as biblical knowledge. It was taken over in 1891 by the Swedish Evangelical Mission Covenant of America; Skogsbergh, together with David Nyvall, was its director until 1894. Skogsbergh would then go on to start the Minnehaha Academy Association in 1904. He also founded newspapers such as Den Kristna Härolden (1884), which later became Minneapolis Veckoblad, a Mission Friends publication. A new church, the Swedish Mission Tabernacle, was built on his initiative in 1887 after he raised the money in three weeks traveling on horseback in the winter. He also helped found the Swedish Hospital in Minneapolis. In 1891 Skogsbergh founded a mission among the Native Americans in Mille Lacs County. His powers failed him, however, and in the early 1900s he lost control of the congregation.

In 1908 he was called to head the Swedish mission congregation in Seattle, where he built a new church. He resigned in 1913, and for about ten years he was active as a free evangelist and undertook extensive preaching tours in the USA. In 1925 Skogsbergh published Minnen och upplevelser under min mer än femtioåriga predikoverksamhet. He died in Minneapolis, Minnesota, USA, in 1939.

== Songs/hymns ==
- "Blodet, blodet, Jesu dyra blod" (FA no. 776) lyrics and music 1882
- "Kom igen, kom igen"
