= Mission Friends =

Swedish religious association

- Missionsvännerna
- Classification: Protestantism
- Orientation: Lutheran, Baptist (Swedish Baptist), Pentecostal, Charismatic, Radical Pietist, Evangelical Christian
- Theology: Pietism and Radical Pietism
- Polity: Movement and Associations
- Separated from: Church of Sweden (Lutheran); Augustana Evangelical Lutheran Church
- Merged into: Swedish Evangelical Mission (Lutheran) Evangelical Free Church in Sweden (Charismatic Baptist); Swedish Alliance Mission; Swedish Holiness Union; Mission Covenant Church of Sweden; Evangelical Covenant Church; Evangelical Free Church of America; Evangelical Free Church of Canada; Converge - Baptist General Conference (United States); Baptist General Conference of Canada; Ethiopian Kale Heywet Church; Fellowship of Christian Assemblies (Pentecostal) Independent Assemblies of God, International (Pentecostal)

The Mission Friends (Swedish: Missionsvännerna) was an interdenominational Christian, mostly Pietist and Radical Pietist association in Sweden and among Swedish Americans (Swedish immigrants) in the United States, that eventually had an impact on several Protestant denominations and their missionary societies today, even outside of Lutheranism, the Swedish community, and the United States, eventually influencing other communities and forming new independent Radical Pietist, Baptist – especially Swedish Baptist – and later on Pentecostal and Charismatic free church denominations.

== History ==
=== Background and Mission Friends in Sweden ===
The Mission Friends had their origins in the spiritual reform movements founded by laymen within the Lutheran Church of Sweden from the mid-19th century onwards, particularly the teachings of Swedish Pietists Carl Olof Rosenius and Peter Fjellstedt. The Evangeliska fosterlands-stiftelsen (today the Swedish Evangelical Mission), founded in 1856 by Fjellstedt and others, was the main association for the group. They called themselves missionsvänner ('mission friends') or simply friends because of their particular focus on home and foreign missions. Other associated organizations included the Swedish Holiness Union (Helgelseförbundet, today part of the Evangelical Free Church in Sweden), Swedish Alliance Mission, and the Mission Covenant Church of Sweden (today part of the Uniting Church in Sweden).

The Mission Friends first emigrated to the United States in the early 1860s. They considered themselves Lutherans "but [did] not consider it right to call themselves after anyone." Their first missionary society was formed in Swede Bend, Iowa, on July 4, 1868, by missionary preacher Carl August Björk as a revival movement in an attempt to reform the local Lutheran church. At almost the same time, revival movements were also being started elsewhere in the Midwest. At Swede Point, north of Des Moines, Hans Blom preached, and elsewhere in Iowa, A. W. Hedenschoug and John Peterson were active preachers. In Galesburg, Illinois, Nicolaus Bergensköld, disciple of the "Reader Count" (läsargreven) Adolphe Stackelberg, preached.

In Chicago, too, a missionary society was formed, which in 1869 became a congregation and was incorporated with the same rights as a church society. The Swedish Evangelical Lutheran Mission Synod was formed in 1873 and included most of the then-existing Swedish mission congregations in America, with the Swedish Evangelical Lutheran Ansgar Synod founded soon after.

American evangelist Dwight L. Moody was highly appreciated and influential among the Mission Friends, despite his lack of personal connection to Sweden or the Swedish language.

Converge Worldwide (Baptist General Conference) and the Baptist General Conference of Canada, are evangelical Baptist denominations of the Swedish Baptist variety, who gained influence from and a connection with fellow Pietists and Radical Pietists within the Mission Friends movement. The missionary societies of Converge and the Baptist General Conference also played a significant part alongside other non-Pietist, non-Mission Friends, and non-Baptist missionary organizations in establishing the evangelical denomination, Ethiopian Kale Heywet Church.

Other denominations with historical and theological connections formed in later years, Some of these groups include the Fellowship of Christian Assemblies and the Independent Assemblies of God International, both of which are Pentecostal associations and denominations with roots in a revival among the Scandinavian Baptist and Pietist communities. Also, the Swedish Pentecostal Movement in Sweden proper emerged out of revivals among communities of Baptist, Scandinavian Baptists, and other theological traditions, namely the Baptist Union of Sweden, which is of Pietist Baptist origin.

==== Free Mission Friends and Free Free ====
In the 1880s, talks were held to determine whether or not to form a union of mission churches. Due to their desire to remain separate from other congregations, De fria vännerna ('the Free Friends') split from the majority in 1884, first known as the Swedish Evangelical Free Mission and later becoming the Evangelical Free Church of America. They did not believe in labels, rather focusing on interdenominational mission work. To this group belonged preachers such as Fredrik Franson, strongly influenced by Moody and his ecumenical revival preaching. Some of the radical Free Mission Friends, led by August Davis, formed a separate group known as the Free Free. They participated in speaking in tongues and healing, practices common in Pentecostalism. The Swedish Evangelical Lutheran Mission Synod merged in 1885 with another association, the Swedish Evangelical Lutheran Ansgar Synod, as well as some independent Mission Friends to form the Swedish Evangelical Mission Covenant in America. It eventually became the Evangelical Covenant Church, considered a sister church to the Mission Covenant Church of Sweden.

In the early 1910s, the Mission Friends ran "an immigrant mission, Alaskan and Chinese missions, and a retirement home and hospital" as well as founding what is today North Park University in 1895. Their publication Missionsvännen was published from 1874 to 1960.

== Beliefs ==
While initially associated with the Augustana Lutheran Church, the Mission Friends disapproved of their lack of zeal for missions and what they saw as a blend of "'spiritual' and 'worldly' elements", seeing it as "no great improvement on the state church of the old country". The Mission Friends' beliefs were described by professor Axel Mellander, who stated, "they generally stand on Lutheran ground in their attitude to the means of grace." While believing it wrong to name themselves after anyone, they held a high view of Luther and often studied his writings. "They will not be bound by the Augsburg Confession, although sanctioning its contents in the main... It may be said with relative accuracy that the Mission Covenant sustains the same relation to the Lutheran Church in this country as the Brethren (Moravians) do to that of Germany." He also compared their ecclesiology to "a middle road between the Congregational and the Presbyterian form." Swedish nyevangelist Paul Petter Waldenström's influence on their theology was substantial: particularly his doctrine of the atonement, at odds with that of the Church of Sweden, that humanity is reconciled to God in the atonement rather than the reverse "was adopted by virtually all of the Mission Friends".

== See also ==
- George Scott, associated Methodist preacher
- Pietisten, Rosenius' and Scott's journal for Mission Friends
- Minneapolis Veckoblad, Swedish-language Mission Friends newspaper founded by Erik August Skogsbergh
- Swedish Holiness Union
- Assemblies of God in Brazil
