= Jakob Ekman =

Swedish priest and politician (1842–1915)

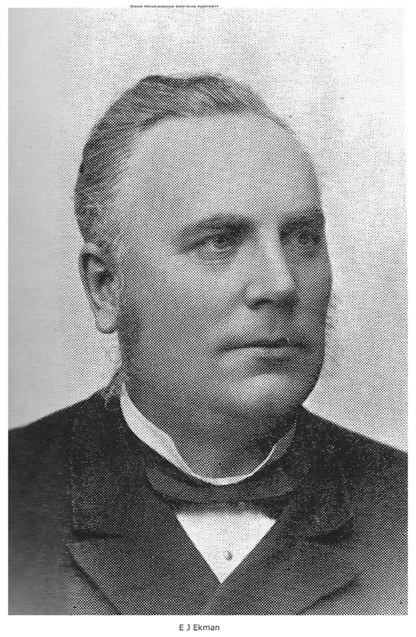
- Born: 8 January 1842; Strömsbro, Gävleborg County, Sweden
- Died: 18 August 1915 (aged 73); Furusund, Stockholm County, Sweden
- Other name: Erik Jakob Ekman
- Education: Uppsala University
- Occupations: Priest, free church leader, author, member of the Riksdag

Erik Jakob Ekman, called Ekman i Kristinehamn and Ekman i Stockholm in the Riksdag (8 January 1842 – 18 August 1915) was a Swedish priest, free church leader, and author. He was one of the founders of what became the Mission Covenant Church of Sweden and was a member of Parliament for a total of about seven years. He was the father of entrepreneur and member of Parliament Josef Ekman.

== Biography ==
Ekman was born in 1842 in Strömsbro, Gävleborg County, to vicar Lars Ekman and Katarina Charlotta Rydberg. He became a student at Uppsala University in 1862; during that time he found the Pietist revival movement through Carl Olof Rosenius' works and publication Pietisten. He was ordained in 1864 and graduated as a pastor in 1871.

In 1869, Ekman married Maria Lovisa Sjöstrom (1848–1927), daughter of provost Carl Fredrik Sjöström and Lovisa Catharina Norman. The couple had eleven children, including business owner and politician Josef (1870), Jakob Efraim (1876), business leader Johannes (Nannes) Laurentius (1877), Paul Emanuel (1879), Ester Katarina (1881), Fredrik Esaias (1884), Lydia Maria (1886), and Julia Elisabet (1888).

He served in the Church of Sweden, including as curate of Ockelbo parish from 1869. While at first holding to Lutheran ecclesiology, he eventually grew to hold more free-church views, becoming part of the Läsare (Reader) movement. Ten years later, he resigned from the priesthood because of disagreements with the church over confirmation, communion and the lack of church discipline. Ekman spearheaded the founding of the Svenska Missionsförbundet (Mission Covenant Church of Sweden) in 1878 and became its first president. From 1879 to 1886, he was a teacher at the church's school in Kristinehamn, as well as the school's director and then the missionary director of the Mission Covenant Church of Sweden. Meanwhile, he was an important author in the free church movement and involved in publishing.

From 1877 to 1880 Ekman published Vittnet, kristlig månadsskrift, a Christian monthly, together with free church leader Paul Petter Waldenström; and from 1880 to 1885 the periodical Förbundet, together with priest Andreas Fernholm. He also edited the periodical Missionsförbundet (1885–1904) and the calendar Grenljuset (1888–1903).

In 1904 he resigned as chairman and missionary director of the Mission Covenant Church of Sweden because he found that his views on eschatology, especially on the restoration of all things, universalism, displeased several of the leaders of the association. There had been much debate about his views due to his book Evangelii fullhet och de eviga straffen ('The Fullness of the Gospel and Eternal Punishment', 1903). After leaving the Mission Covenant Church, he became managing director of Svenska livförsäkringsbolaget (the Swedish Life Insurance Company), where he had been a member of the board since 1893.

In 1891, Ekman was awarded an honorary doctorate in theology by the Congregationalist-affiliated Beloit College in Wisconsin, USA.

In 1915, he died at his summer home at Furusund, Stockholm County, Sweden. He was buried at Norra begravningsplatsen.

== Theological views ==
Ekman's views on ecclesiastical and theological issues deviated in several respects from standard Lutheran doctrine; he tended in some aspects towards more reformed views. On the atonement, he believed (like Waldenström) that it was not God who was reconciled or needed to be reconciled through Jesus' death, but that the world should be reconciled. Ekman's view of the world's reconciliation was that it was not completed in the death of Christ, but that the foundation for reconciliation was laid and that Jesus was made perfect as the "captain of salvation" (Hebrews 2:10), who reconciles humanity when they accept him in faith. Ekman first attempted to defend infant baptism as a family baptism, for example in his book Det kristliga dopet ('Christian baptism', 1880), but later became an outspoken opponent of infant baptism. He wrote that the baptism of young children is "in obvious conflict with the essence and nature of New Testament baptism". Ekman adhered to the reformed view of communion. On eschatology, Ekman first held that those who have sinned against the Holy Spirit are eternally damned. However, he later abandoned this view. Ekman strongly denied that God directly dictated the words when the Bible was written, known as verbal inspiration. Ekman called for the abolition of church confirmation and the introduction of compulsory civil marriage. In ecclesiology, he called for ecumenism – unity across denominations.

== Political activity ==
From 1885 to 1887 Ekman represented the municipalities of Kristinehamn, Askersund, Nora and Lindesberg in the Riksdag's Andra kammare (lower house), and the constituency of Stockholm from 1891 to 1893 and 1894 to 1896. He was a member of the Old Lantmanna Party (1894), Lantmanna Party (1895), and independent (1896). As a supporter of free churches, temperance, free trade, and an opponent of militarism, Ekman played a major role in introducing freethought ideas into Swedish politics. He wrote 25 motions of his own, primarily on issues of religious freedom such as the introduction of compulsory civil marriage, the right to leave the state church and the abolition of the obligation to baptize children. One motion concerned the abolition of the death penalty. Ekman was one of the founders of the Swedish parliamentary peace group in 1892 and participated in the Inter-Parliamentary Union's peace conferences in Rome in 1891 and The Hague in 1894. For more than a quarter of a century he was at the forefront of free church activities in Sweden and the promotion of its mission in other countries. In 1899 a conference on the Mission in China was organized, for which a collection of contributions from various missionary organizations was published with a foreword and contributions by Ekman.

== Works ==
Ekman had his own publishing company, E J Ekmans förlagsexpedition; his books were largely self-published.

- Herren är mitt ljus (1877)
- Den lidande och korsfäste Kristus. Passionsbetraktelser (1879)
- Det kristliga dopet (1880)
- Herrens måltid eller Nattvarden (1882)
- Fridsbasunen hymnal (1882) compiled by Jakob Ekman (3rd ed. January 1883)
- Skugga och verklighet, Kort framställning af gamla testamentets helgedom, prestadöme och offer i det nya testamentets ljus (1883)
- Pauli Bref till Efesierna. Kort utläggning (1884)
- De yttersta tingen. Biblisk framställning i 3 häften (1886)
- Den smygande fienden. Ett ord till föräldrar. (1987) 47 pages.
- Bibelskolan (1887)
- Reseminnen från Tyrolen, Italien, Schweiz och Nord-Afrika (1892)
- Illustrerad missionshistoria (two volumes, 1889-1891; second edition 1893)
- Den inre missionens historia från början af 18:e årh. till nuvarande tid (3 parts in 5 volumes, 1896–1902)
  - A revised edition was published by N. P. Ollén (3 parts in 2 volumes, 1921–1922).
- Dop- och pånyttfödelseläran. En vidräkning (1900)
- Den smygande fienden. Ett ord till föräldrar. (Onanin), Ett ord till föräldrar, uppfostrare och lärare. (1901), revised and expanded edition, 54 pages.
- Evangelii fullhet och de ändlösa straffen (1903)
- Svar till P. Waldenström (1904)
