= Stackelberg =

Stackelberg is a surname, mainly known as the surname of a noble family of Baltic German descent (see Stackelberg family). Notable people with the surname include:

== A ==
- Adolphe Stackelberg (1822–1871), Swedish count and Christian revivalist
- Aleksandr Stackelberg (1897–1975), Russian entomologist

== B ==
- Berndt Otto Stackelberg (1662–1734), Swedish Field Marshal
- Berndt Otto Stackelberg, Jr. (1777–1841), Swedish Field Marshal

== C ==
- Christoph von Stackelberg (1777–1841), Baltic German, second husband of Josephine Brunsvik

== E ==
- Eduard von Stackelberg (1867–1943), Baltic German in Estonia chemist, landowner and politician
- Ernst von Stackelberg (1813–1870), Baltic German serving as a Russian military figure and diplomat

== F ==
- Fritz Stackelberg (1899–1988), Swedish diplomat

== G ==
- Garnett Stackelberg (1910–2005), US journalist and socialite
- Georg von Stackelberg (1851–1913), Baltic German serving as a Russian Cavalry General
- Gustav Ernst von Stackelberg (1766–1850), Baltic German serving as a Russian ambassador at the Congress of Vienna

== H ==
- Heinrich Freiherr von Stackelberg (1905–1946), Baltic German economist

== O ==
- Otto Magnus von Stackelberg (ambassador) (1736–1800), Baltic German serving as a Russian ambassador
- Otto Magnus von Stackelberg (archaeologist) (1786–1837), Baltic German archaeologist from Estonia

== S ==
- Siegfried Nikolai von Stackelberg of Erchless Castle, Scotland

== See also ==
- Stackelberg competition (named after Heinrich Freiherr von Stackelberg), a strategic game in economics in which the leader firm moves first and then the follower firms move sequentially
