= Minneapolis Veckoblad =

Swedish-language American newspaper

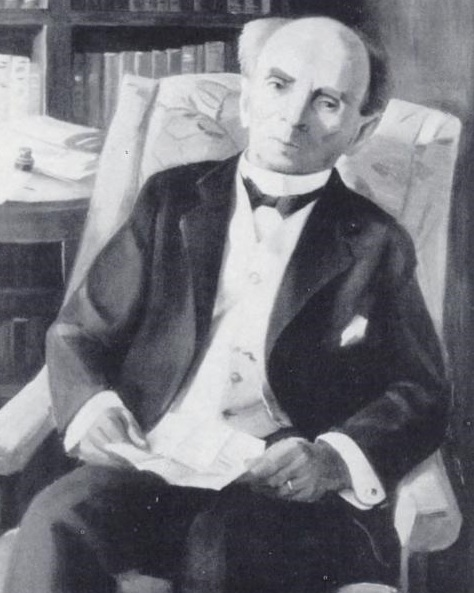
Minneapolis Veckoblad's founder E. August Skogsbergh; portrait by Dewey Albinson (1931)

Minneapolis Veckoblad ('Minneapolis Weekly', also spelled Minneapolis Weckoblad) was a Swedish-language newspaper for Mission Friends published in Minneapolis, Minnesota, USA. It was founded in 1884 by preacher Erik August Skogsbergh under the name Svenska kristna härolden ('The Swedish Christian Herald') but was published under the new name from October 1887 to February 1906. In 1890 a corporation took over the publication of the newspaper. In 1906, its name was changed to Veckobladet. Skogsbergh served as the newspaper's editor for some time; Andrew Johnson, K. Newquist, and Erik Dahlhielm would later be its editors. Minneapolis Veckoblad described itself as a "Christian and political newspaper". In 1904, it was described as "one of the most widely distributed Swedish newspapers in America."

The majority of its content was from a Mission Friends (Mission Covenant) theological perspective. Students from Skogsbergh's school for Swedish immigrants translated content into Swedish for the newspaper. The newspaper often covered preacher Dwight Moody, featuring his sermons and information about his revival meetings, as well as asking readers to support his mission work to soldiers during the Spanish-American War. The sermons of Paul Petter Waldenström, Thomas De Witt Talmage, Charles Spurgeon, and others were also frequently published. Skogsbergh contributed his own popular column, "Observations and Reflections", featuring his thoughts on a number of topics.

Author Sigge Strömberg worked for the paper as a young man from 1904 to 1905.
