= Kassari Chapel =

Chapel in Hiuu County, Estonia

Coordinates: 58.810°N 22.865°E

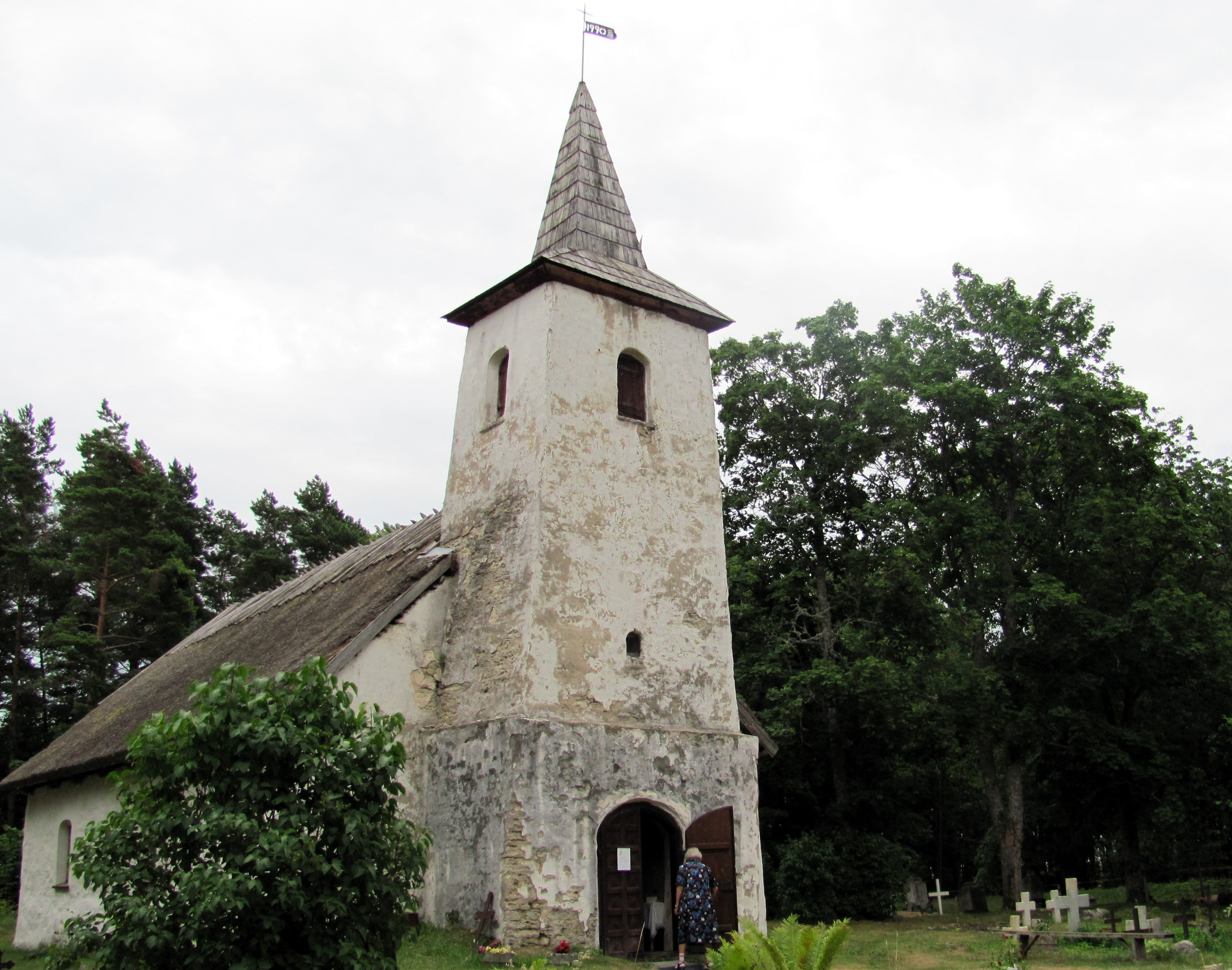
Kassari chapel in 2010

Kassari Chapel (Estonian: Kassari kabel) is a chapel on the island of Kassari in Hiiu County, Estonia, thought to date to the 18th century.

Kassari Chapel is the only functioning stone church in Estonia with a thatched roof. Major repair work bearing the date 1801 on an inner wall suggests that the current chapel was built in the 18th century, probably replacing a wooden structure dating to the 16th century.

Members of the Stackelberg family who owned the Kassari estate are buried in the chapel's graveyard, which also houses the tomb of Villem Tamm, Johann Köler's model for the figure of Christ in his mural "Come to Me" in Charles' Church (Kaarli kirik), Tallinn.

== Gallery ==
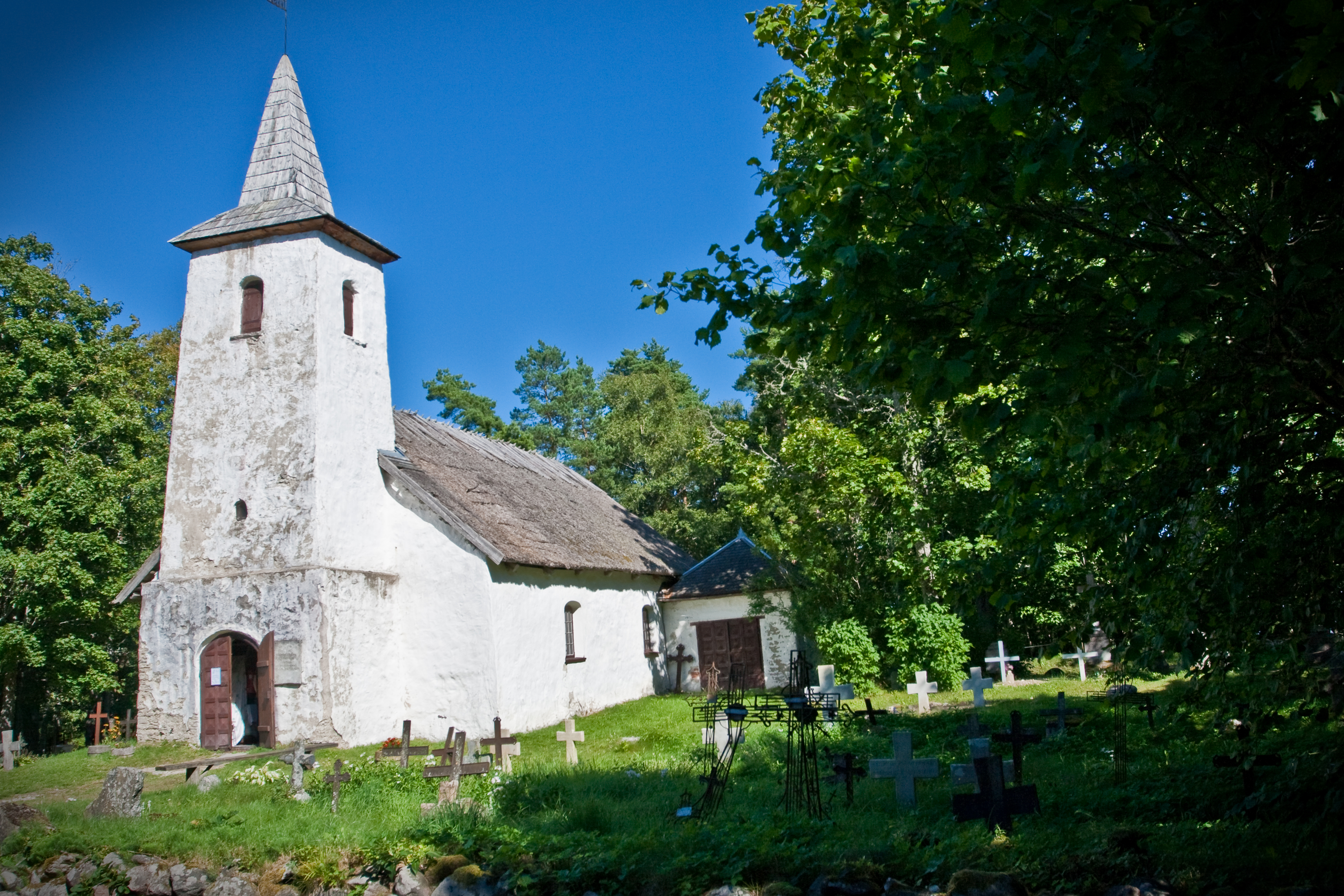

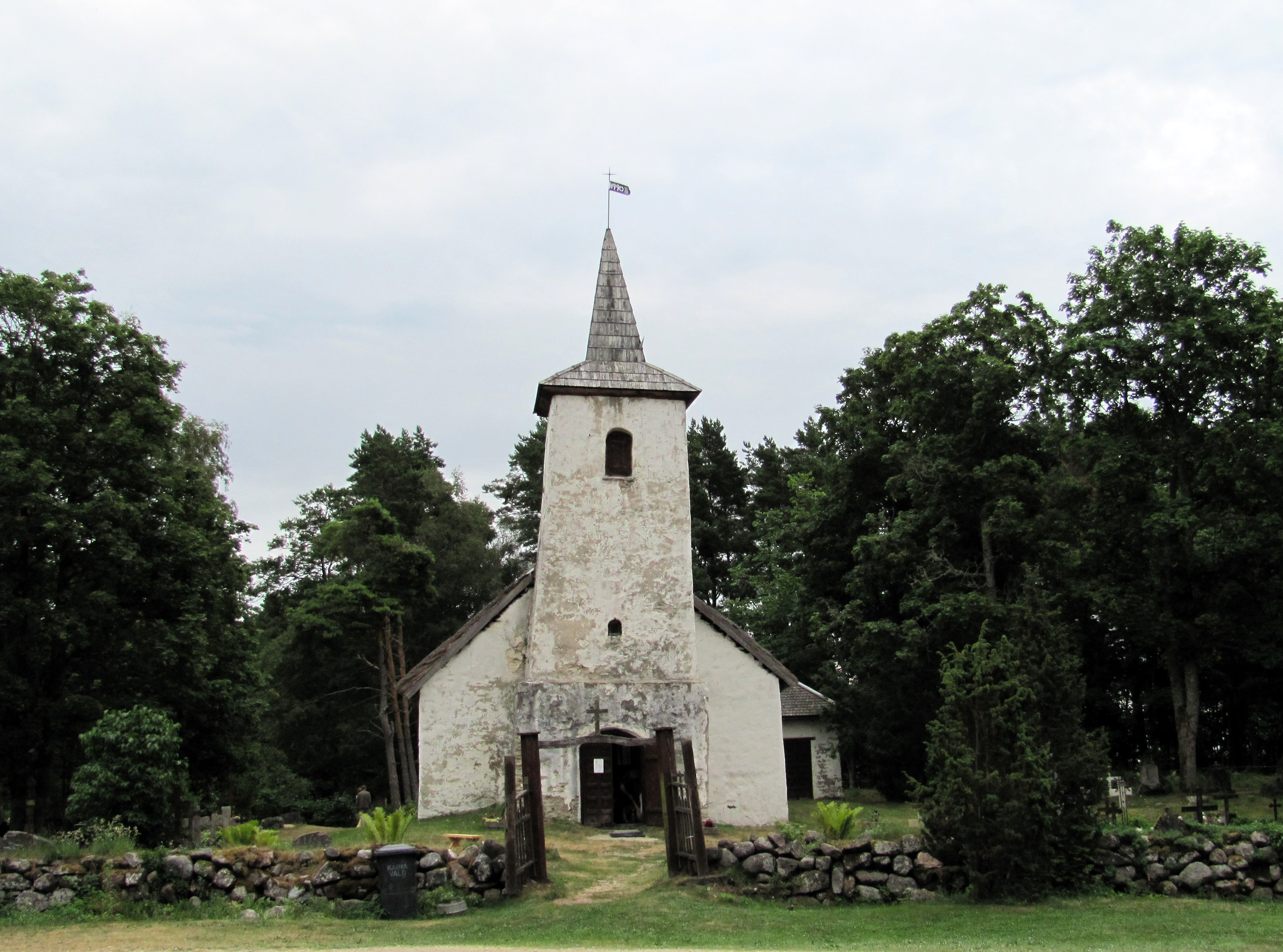

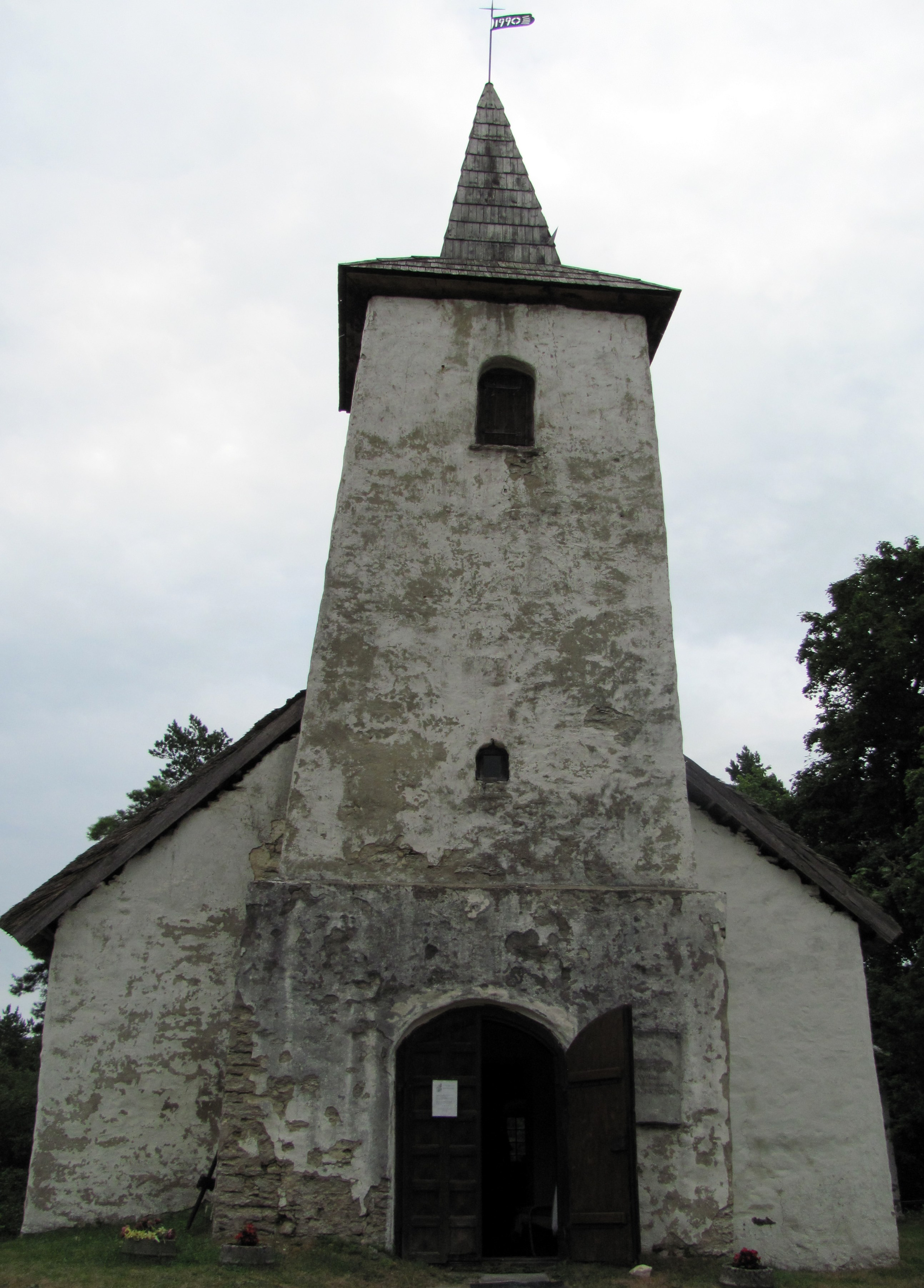

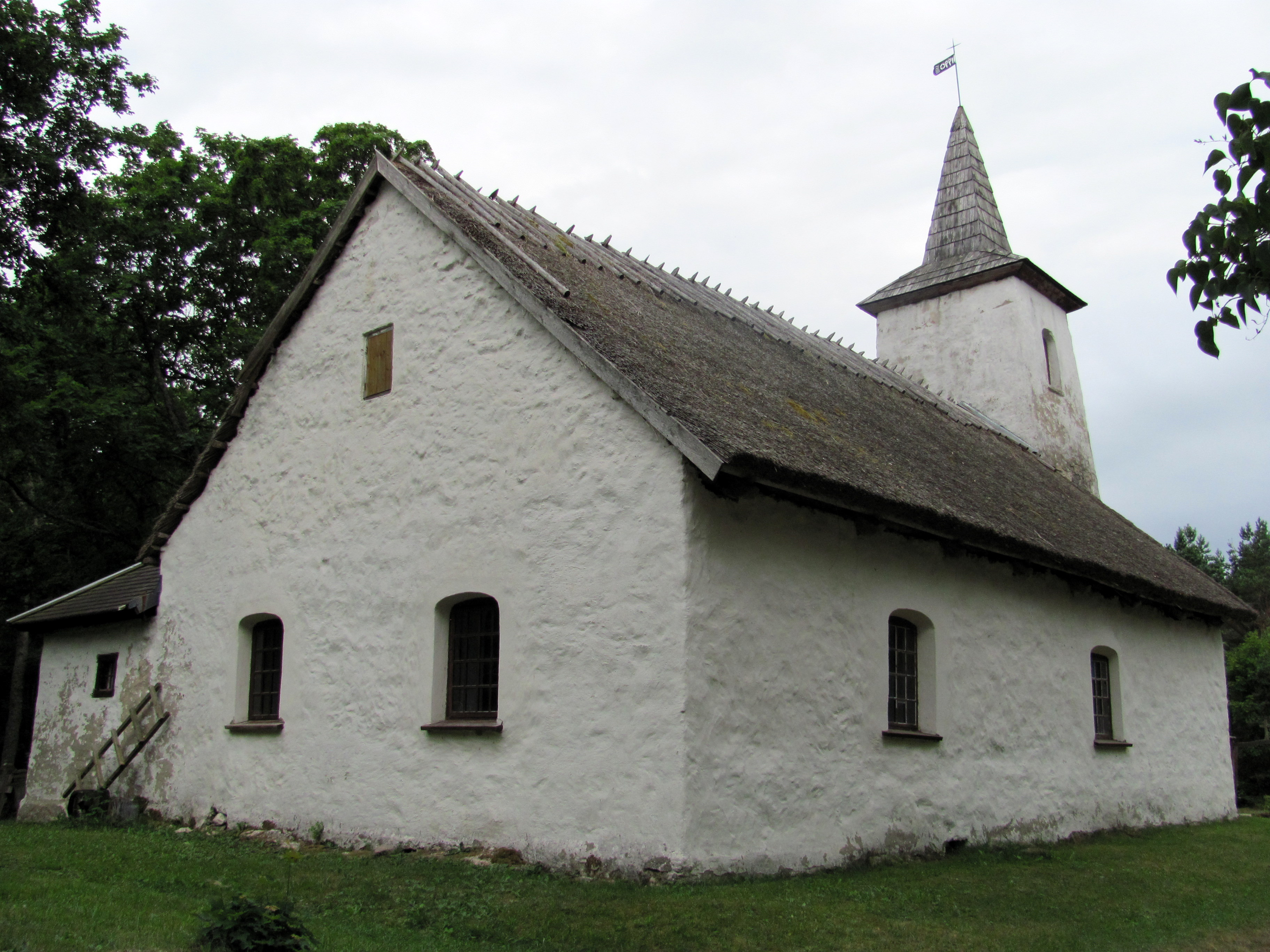

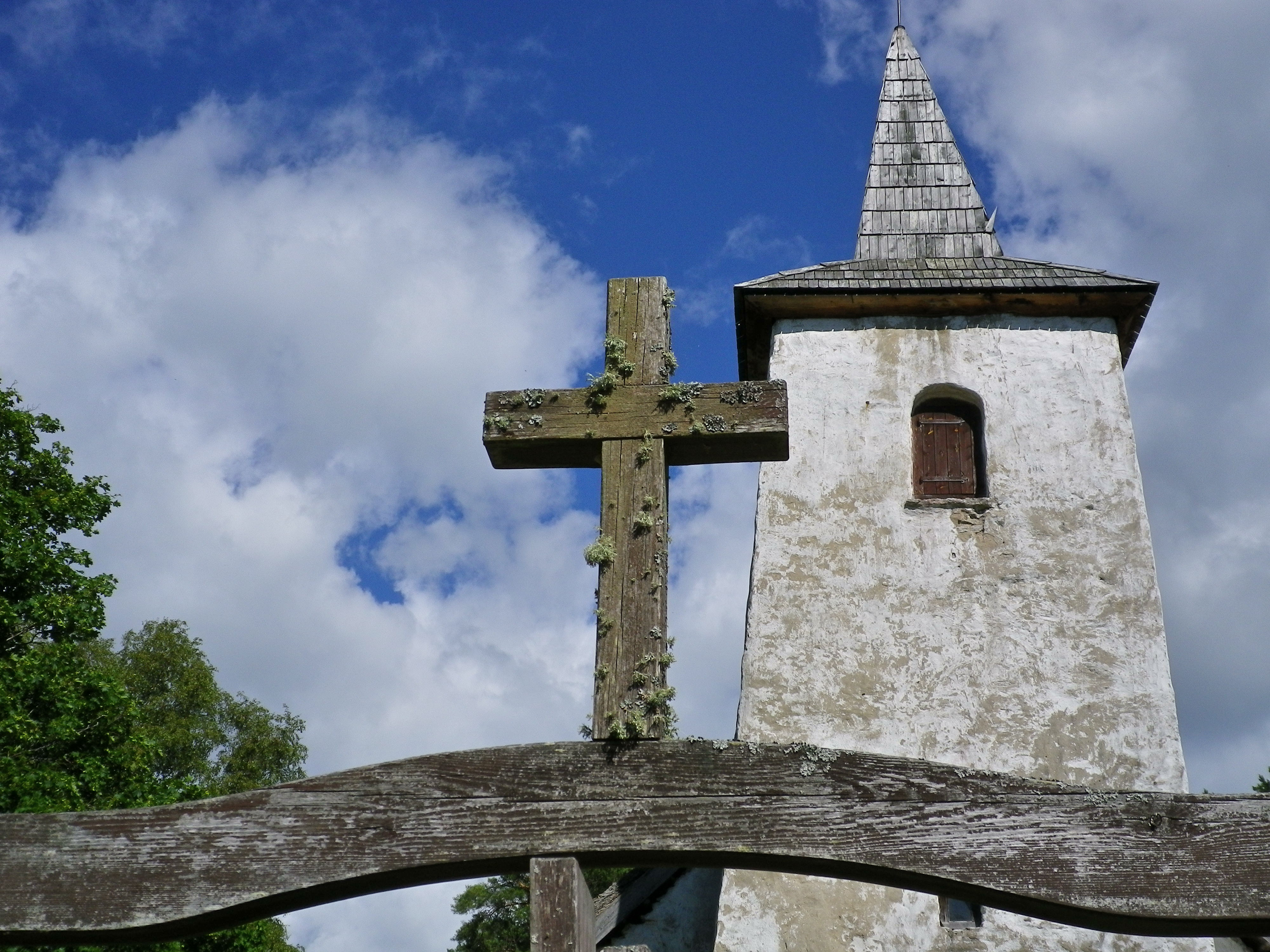

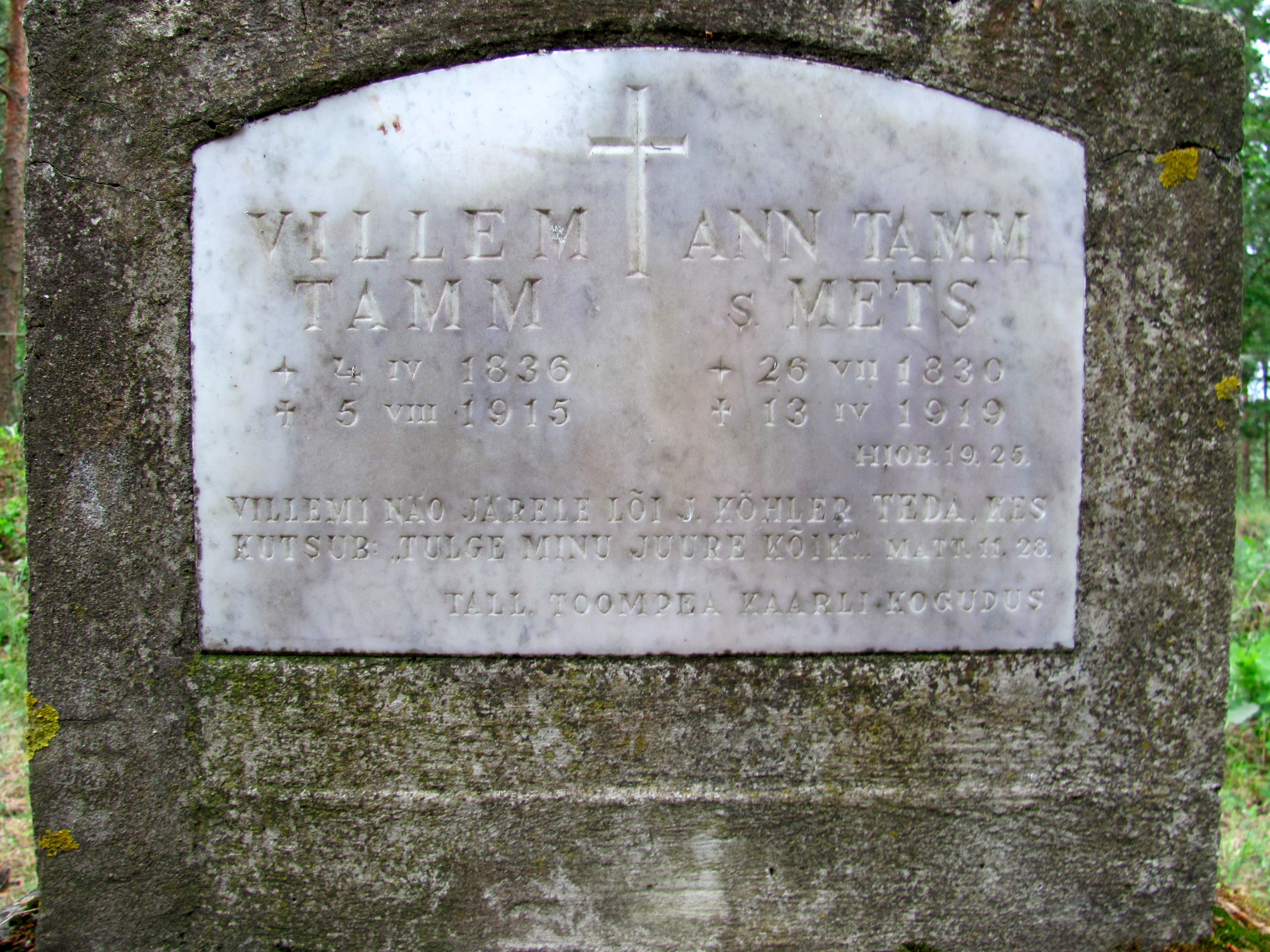
The tomb of Villem and Ann Tamm in the chapel cemetery.
