= Charlotte Cecilia af Tibell =

Swedish author

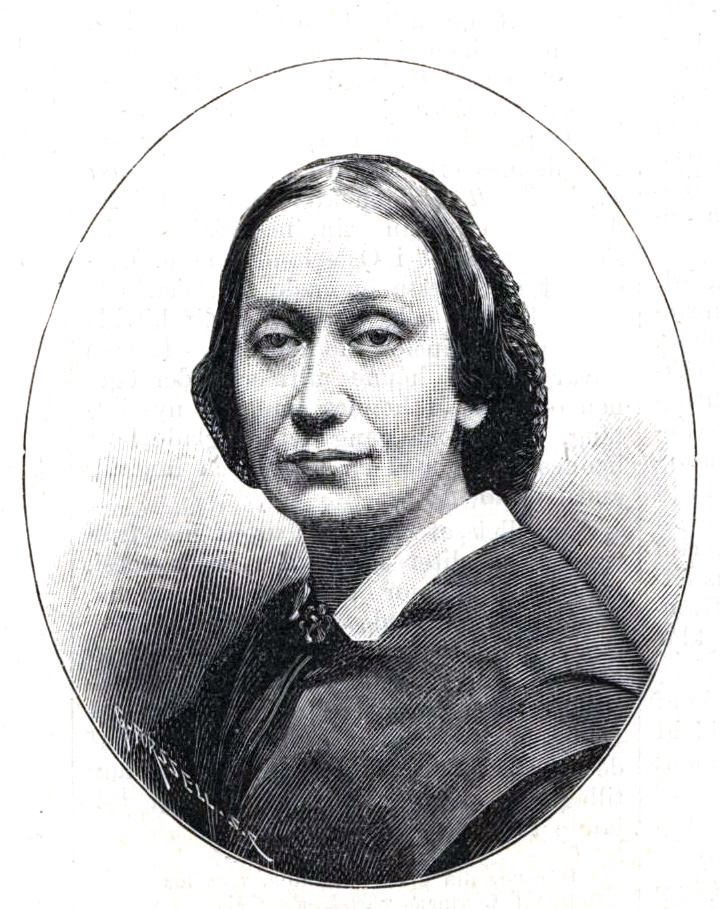
- Charlotte Cecilia af Tibell
- Born: 29 January 1820
- Died: 16 April 1901 (aged 81)
- Occupations: author, hymnwriter

Charlotte Cecilia af Tibell (29 January 1820 – 16 April 1901) was a Swedish author and hymnwriter. She also wrote Christian short stories and feminist stories against egoistic men.

== Biography ==
She was the daughter of Lieutenant General Baron Gustaf Wilhelm af Tibell and Sophia Albertina Cederling, and the half-sister of Wilhelmina af Tibell. Among other things, she wrote hymns and published the hymn collection Flowers by the Road to Zion under the name C. T., 1852–1867. She was friends with hymnwriters Agatha Rosenius and Lina Sandell.

== Bibliography ==
- Blommor vid vägen till Zion. Bonnier. 1852–1867.
- Bibelns Qvinnor : tio taflor. Stockholms art. litogr. anstalt. 1873.
