= Agatha Rosenius =

Swedish hymnwriter (1814–1874)

- Born: Agatha Ulrika Lindberg; 10 September 1814; Grisbacka, Sweden
- Died: 29 August 1874 (aged 59)
- Occupation: Hymnwriter
- Spouse: Carl Olof Rosenius (m. 1843; died 1868)

Agatha Rosenius (10 September 1814 – 29 August 1874) was a Swedish hymnwriter.

== Biography ==
She was born Agatha Ulrika Lindberg to county official Erik Lindberg and Elisabeth Catharina (née Nordlund) in Grisbacka, today part of Umeå. She found an active Christian faith at a young age – a belief not shared by her parents and which led to conflict in the home.

Preacher Carl Olof Rosenius later visited her hometown, encouraging her in her faith. They both described feeling that God had brought them their future spouse. After corresponding for a time, and after eventually receiving her parents' approval, the two were married on 2 August 1843 in Umeå by priest A. A. Grafström. She was described by her husband as being satisfied with simple living and not caring for worldly interests, and by others as shy but unforgettable. They had seven children, including painter Elisabeth Nyström and Per Efraim Rosenius, who became a liberal journalist in Karl Staaff and Hjalmar Branting's circles. The couple was known for their hospitality, often inviting fellow revivalists who were traveling to stay with them.

Rosenius was known for her musical and poetic ability and regularly played the piano. She was friends with fellow hymnwriters Lina Sandell and Charlotte af Tibell. Upon her death in 1874, both friends wrote tribute poems to her memory. Charlotte af Tibell wrote:

Agatha levde ett himmelskt liv,
ej skådat av mänskligt öga,
ett liv i tron benådat.
Men ock tillika det livet rika
av helgad kärlek, som ej vill svika i döden.

—Charlotte af Tibell

Agatha lived a heavenly life,
unseen by the human eye,
a life in faith pardoned.
But likewise the life rich
in sanctified love that will not fail in death.

Rosenius herself composed a number of songs with religious themes, some of which were published in the Swedish Baptist hymnal Psalmisten and some in other hymnals. Her work, however, was not published in the Church of Sweden's hymnal, Den svenska psalmboken ('The Swedish hymnal') until one of her songs appeared in the supplement to the 1986 Den svenska psalmboken, the Swedish Evangelical Mission's 1986 Swedish hymnal supplement.

== Hymns ==
- "Till fridens hem, till rätta fadershuset" (Svenska Missionsförbundets sångbok, 1920, number 423 under the heading Hemlandssånger.
- "Ur stormarna ser jag en avlägsen hamn", translated from English lyrics by C. M. Youngquist (Svenska Missionsförbundets sångbok, 1920, number 313 under the heading Strid och lidande, Sionstoner 1935)
- "Vad helst här i världen bedrövar min själ" (1847)
