= Eduard von Stackelberg =

Estonian chemist, landowner, and politician (1867–1943)

Freiherr Eduard von Stackelberg
- Born: 6 November [O.S. 25 October] 1867; Sillamäggi Manor, Sillamäggi, Kreis Wierland, Governorate of Estonia, Russian Empire (in present-day Sillamäe, Ida-Viru County, Estonia)
- Died: 7 April 1943 (aged 75); Munich, Bavaria, Germany
- Scientific career
- Fields: Chemistry

Eduard Otto Emil Karl Adam Freiherr von Stackelberg (6 November 1867 in Sillamäe, Estonia – 7 April 1943 in Munich, Germany) was an Estonian chemist, landowner and politician who belonged to the Stackelberg family. As a chemist, he proposed a model for the periodic table in 1911. He was among the Baltic German landowners deported to Siberia, first by the Tsarist authorities and later by the Bolsheviks. Following World War I he lived in Germany. In 1927, he published a memoir.

== Early life and education ==
Eduard von Stackelberg was the son of Otto Ferdinand Wolter von Stackelberg (1837-1909) and Sophie Marie Elizabeth von Seydlitz (vt. Seidlitz) (1837-1920). He was born at the manor of Sillamäggi, near the village of Repnik, Kreis Wierland, Governorate of Estonia (now Sillamäe and Hiiemetsa, Ida-Viru County, Estonia). His father was a younger son in a large family, while his mother inherited the manor and lands of Sillamäggi.

Eduard von Stackelberg attended Friedrich Kollmann's Gymnasium in Dorpat (now Tartu) from 1881 to 1884. He also studied from 1885 to 1886 at the Nicolai Gymnasium in Reval (now Tallinn).

== Chemistry ==
From 1886 to 1892, Eduard von Stackelberg studied mathematics, chemistry and physics at the Imperial University of Dorpat (now the University of Tartu), graduating with a degree in chemistry in 1893. He also studied at the Naturwissenschaften Leipzig from 1892 to 1893; with Gabriel Lippmann at the Sorbonne in Paris from 1893 to 1894; and in the laboratory of the Akademie der Wissenschaften in St. Petersburg from 1894 to 1895. From 1895 to 1896, he worked in the laboratory of Wilhelm Ostwald at the University of Leipzig

He was an assistant at the University of Dorpat in 1896, and a teacher at the Riga Technical University from 1898 to 1899. After returning to Livonia he worked as an assistant professor with Gustav Tammann at the University of Dorpat from 1896 to 1898.

In 1911, Eduard von Stackelberg published a paper discussing a possible model for the periodic table, Versuch einer neuen tabellarischen Gruppierung der Elemente auf Grund des periodischen Systems ("A New Tabular Grouping of the elements on the basis of the periodic system"). It was positively reviewed in Chemical Abstracts: "The author gives a form of periodic table, which possesses certain advantages, especially that it aids in enabling one to remember the variation of certain physical and chem. properties of related elements in passing from group to group of the table."

== Marriage ==
In 1896 in St. Petersburg, Eduard von Stackelberg married Elisabeth (Else) Marie von Sievers (vt. Sivers). They had three children: Nicolai Mark Otto August von Stackelberg (1896-1971), Brigitte, and Elisabeth.

Eduard von Stackelberg's sister Sophie Amelie von Stackelberg married the brother of the chemist Andreas von Antropoff (1878-1956). Eduard's son Mark von Stackelberg studied chemistry with his uncle Andreas von Antropoff, completing his dissertation at the Rheinische Friedrich-Wilhelms-Universität, and co-authoring an extensive discussion of the periodic table in the Atlas der physikalischen und anorganischen Chemie ("Atlas of physical and inorganic chemistry; The properties of the elements and their connections", 1929). Mark von Stackelberg later taught at the University of Bonn, working with polarography and voltammetry.

== Land and politics ==
As a landowner, Eduard Baron Stackelberg held the manors of Sutlem, Limmat and Mäeküla (Mähküll, Estonian: Mäeküla mõis) (now Sutlema, Lümandu and Mäeküla, Rapla County, Estonia) in Kreis Harrien. He was a proponent of Baltic German patriotism and a leader of the Baltic Constitutional Party.

Eduard von Stackelberg served as secretary of the Estonian Knighthood from 1899 to 1911 and served as deputy chief captain of the knighthood from 1912 to 1918. Stackelberg was one of the founders of the Deutscher Verein in Estland (German Association of Estonia) in 1905, and served as its chairman. The association promoted a pan-Baltic organization, in sympathy with pan-Germanic ideals, while emphasizing that it still supported the Russian Tsar and constitution. When von Stackelberg attempted to organize a conference in Reval to bring together similar organizations, he was fiercely attacked by Russian press, the Duma and the Russian authorities.

From 1915 to 1917, during World War I, Stackelberg and his family were sent to Jeniseisk in Siberia by the Tsarists. They were exiled for their pro-German political position. Stackelberg remained in Siberia until the 1917 revolution, when he was allowed to return to Estonia. He quarreled severely with Count Hermann von Keyserling, leader of a more cosmopolitan group of exiled Baltic Germans.

In 1918, Stackelberg was deported again, when the Bolsheviks exiled German landlords. This time he was sent to Krasnoyarsk, Siberia. His baronial lands were confiscated and turned over to the state to become collective farms. After the signing of the Brest-Litovsk Peace Treaty, which allowed deportees to return, he moved to Germany, where his wife still owned land in Lochen. As of autumn 1918, Eduard von Stackelberg lived in Upper Bavaria near the outskirts of Munich. He returned to Berlin, where he served on the Baltic Confidence Council from 1919 to 1920. He worked with the association of Christian charities in Schleswig-Holstein until 1927.

In 1927-1934, Stackelberg wrote a two-part memoir, A life in the Baltic struggle; Looking back on what is aspired, lost and won.

Eduard von Stackelberg died in Munich on 7 April 1943.

== Bibliography ==
- Stackelberg, Eduard von (1911). "Versuch einer neuen tabellarischen Gruppierung der Elemente auf Grund des periodischen Systems ("A New Tabular Grouping of the elements on the basis of the periodic system")". Z. Phys. Chem. 77 (651): 75–81. doi:10.1515/zpch-1911-7706. S2CID 92867105.
- Stackelberg, Eduard von (1927). Ein Leben im baltischen Kampf; Rückschau auf Erstrebtes, Verloren und Gewonnenes ("A life in the Baltic struggle; Looking back on what is aspired, lost and won"). München: J.F. Lehmanns.
- Stackelberg, Mark von (1927). Dissertation. Bonn.
- Antropoff, Andreas von; Stackelberg, Mark von (1932). Atlas der physikalischen und anorganischen Chemie with Nachträge für die Jahre 1929-1931. Berlin: Verlag Chemie.
- Stackelberg, Eduard von (1964). Aus meinem Leben; die Kriegsjahre 1914-1918; Verschickung nach Sibirien ("Out of my life; The war years 1914-1918; Sent to Siberia"). Hannover-Döhren: H. von Hirschheydt.
- Stackelberg, Eduard von (2010). Ühe baltlase võitlustee : püüdlused, võidud ja kaotused (Originally published: München : J.F. Lehmanns Verlag, 1927 ed.). [Tallinn]: Eesti Päevaleht ("One White Battle: Aspirations, Victories and Losses" vt. "The Battle of One: the aspirations, victories and losses, from the end of the 1860s to the beginning of the 1930s"). ISBN 9789949475186.
