= Nicolaus Bergensköld =

Swedish-American clergyman

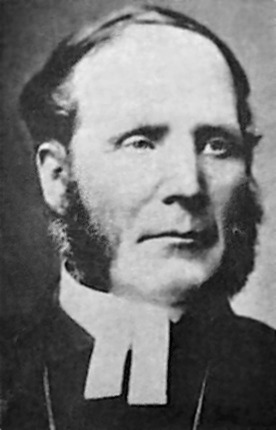
- Born: May 20, 1838; Småland, Sweden
- Died: 1907 (aged 68–69); Buena Vista County, Iowa, United States
- Spouse: Anna Lisa Henriksson
- Church: Church of Sweden
- Title: Minister

Nils Gustaf Nicolaus Bergensköld (1838–1907) was a Swedish-American Lutheran clergyman and an early leader of the revivalist movement within Swedish immigrant settlements of the Midwestern United States during the later part of the 19th century.

== Biography ==
Nicolaus Bergensköld was born May 20, 1838, at Vintrosa parish in Orebro, Sweden. He studied for the ministry at the Fjellstedt mission training school which had been established by Swedish Lutheran missionary Peter Fjellstedt during 1845 in Uppsala. He also became strongly influenced by the Piestist teaching of Swedish Lutheran minister and revivalist Carl Olof Rosenius, founder of the Swedish Evangelical Mission. After completing his education, he served as a priest (1865–1867) of Överums Church which had been established in 1862 at the mill town of Överums bruk in Småland under the guidance of the "Reader Count" Adolphe Stackelberg (1822–1871) who was an enthusiast within the Swedish Lutheran revivalist and missionary movement.

In 1867, he emigrated from Sweden to the United States. He first settled in Galesburg, Illinois. Many within the congregation wanted him to minister in the church there. However, due to his association with Rosenius, the pastor of the congregation refused him. However, several of the members on the board of deacons arranged private devotional services led by Bergensköld. Eventually in 1868 the conflict led to a split in the church resulting in the formation of the Swedish Lutheran Mission Church in Galesburg. Modeled on the Swedish Evangelical Mission, it was one of the first of its kind in the United States.

Bergensköld left Galesburg for Iowa in April 1869 and was succeeded by the Reverend Carl Anderson. In 1873, Bergensköld moved to the Swedish-American community in Marshall County, Kansas where he again helped set up a new mission society. He was ordained during 1874 by the Kansas Synod of the Augustana Evangelical Lutheran Church.

Later he returned to Buena Vista County, Iowa where he took over as minister of a newly established Lutheran congregation, the Swedish Evangelical Ljunghed Church, a post he served between 1877 and 1881. He retired from the ministry in 1882 and died in 1907.

== See also ==
- Mission Friends

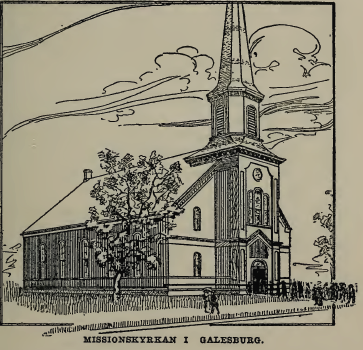
Mission church in Galesburg, Founded by Bergensköld in 1868
