= David Nyvall =

Swedish church leader (1863–1946)

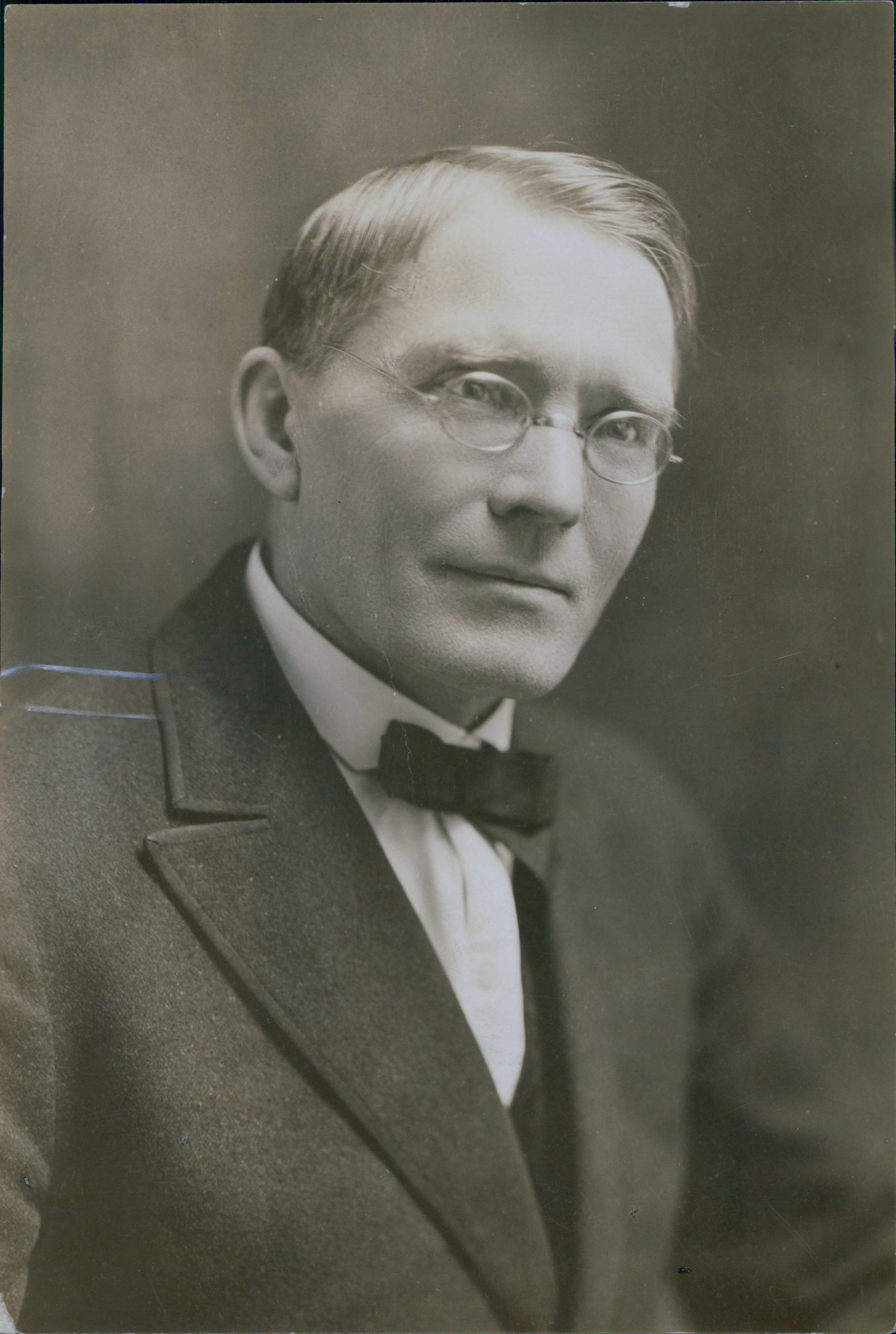
Dr. David Nyvall

David Nyvall (January 19, 1863 – February 6, 1946) was a Swedish immigrant to the United States and church leader who helped shape the Evangelical Covenant Church and establish North Park University in Chicago.

== Biography ==
=== Upbringing and education ===
Nyvall was born in Karlskoga, Sweden, the son of Carl Johan Nyvall, a colporteur who helped found the Mission Covenant Church in Sweden, and Anna Margareta Moberg. He immigrated to America in 1886 at age 23; he settled in Illinois and became involved in the nascent denomination in the states. Though his educational background was pre-med, he accepted an offer from Erik August Skogsbergh (1850–1939) to teach at his school in Minneapolis, Minnesota. In 1887 he married Skogsbergh's sister Lovisa (Louise) and served a year as pastor to a church in Sioux City, Iowa.

=== Career ===
The next year he began teaching in the Swedish department of the Chicago Theological Seminary, which at the time provided the theological education of many Covenant pastors. Nyvall felt strongly that the Covenant should have its own school. Acting on this conviction, he resigned from the Chicago Theological Seminary and returned to Skogsbergh's Minneapolis school, which the Covenant had recently accepted as the denomination's school. Three years later, in 1891, this school was moved to Chicago and North Park College was established, a decision that upset some, including Nyvall's brother-in-law, Skogsbergh.

=== North Park ===
Nyvall served as president of North Park and professor of New Testament in the seminary. Under his leadership and guidance, the school survived struggles and grew in both enrollment and endowment. The Covenant underwent a scandal in which P. H. Anderson, a Covenant missionary to Alaska, discovered gold; there was a dispute as to who should get the money. Largely as a result of the criticism and disagreement, Nyvall resigned as president and professor in 1904 and left the school the following year.

=== 1905–1912 ===
In his absence, he served as the first president of Walden College in McPherson, Kansas. In 1907 he returned to Sweden and the following year he took up residence in Minneapolis where he edited the early Covenant periodical Veckoblad. He also established the department of Scandinavian Studies at the University of Washington and served as professor from 1910 until 1912.

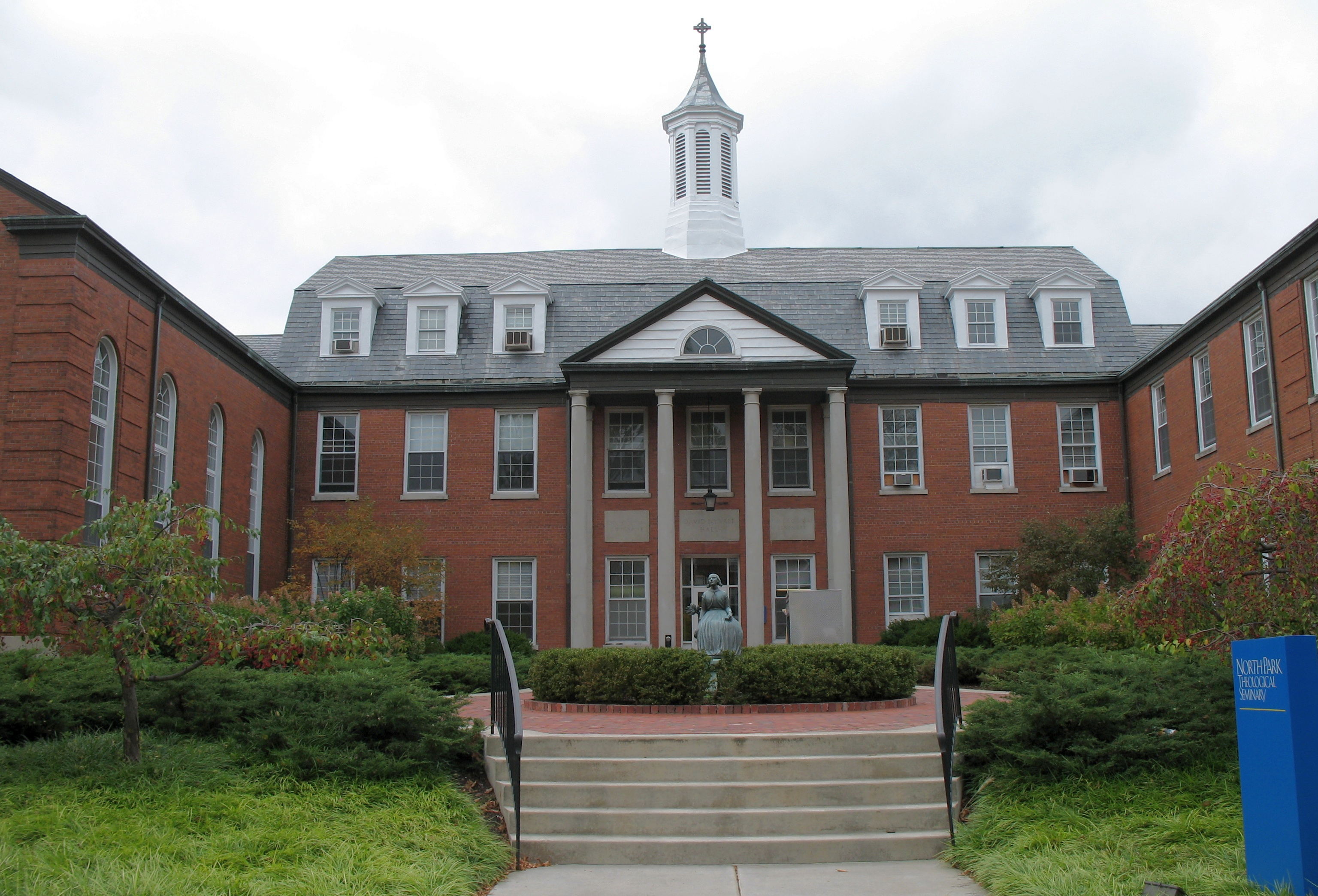
Nyvall hall of North Park University

=== Return to North Park ===
In January 1912, Nyvall accepted to Covenant's call to resume his position at North Park, and returned as president of the school, a position he held until 1923. After 1923, Nyvall continued to serve North Park and the Covenant by acting as dean of the seminary and teacher until 1941.

=== Legacy ===
The main seminary building, Nyvall Hall, bears his name. His understanding of Christian education, specifically Covenant education, is still normative and formative at North Park University. The David Nyvall lecture series was inaugurated in 1951 in memory of the pioneer Swedish American educator who served the school both as teacher and president.

== Other sources ==
- Carlson, Leland "A History of North Park College" (North Park College and Theological Seminary, 1941)
- Erickson, Scott E. David Nyvall & the Shape of an Immigrant Church (Almqvist & Wiksell. 1996) ISBN 91-554-3718-4
