= Pietisten =

Swedish Christian publication

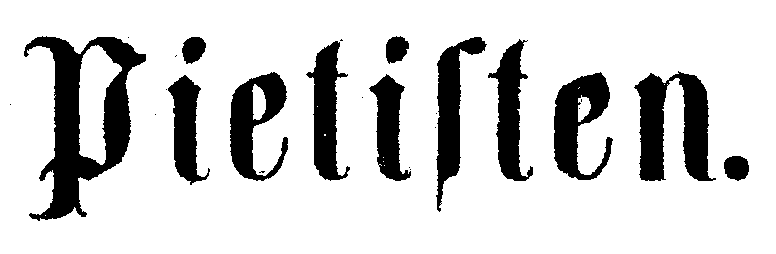
Titles from the reissue of the first fifteen issues.

Pietisten ("The Pietist") was a Swedish Christian monthly publication "for religious revival and edification", described by one scholar as "the theological journal of Nyevangelism", and founded in January 1842 by the Scottish Methodist minister George Scott, who had immigrated to Sweden. The word pietist, from the Latin word pietas, meaning 'piety, godliness', refers to the Pietist movement.

== History ==
Scott founded the journal with the goal of "practical edification without polemics" and was its editor for several months until he was forced to leave the country. During that time, he focused primarily on topics such as conversion stories and Christian living. After Scott's departure in April 1842, Pietisten was edited by preacher Carl Olof Rosenius, who was left to continue Scott's work; its tone changed somewhat as Rosenius took it in a Moravian Brethren-influenced direction, and began to include biblical exposition as well as occasional material from Johann Konrad Wilhelm Löhe, John Charles Ryle, Erik Pontoppidan, and others. During Rosenius' editorship, the magazine was essentially written by him, and was his main literary channel. In this way it had a great influence. His articles have subsequently been published as reflections and writings with a total circulation of two million, and another million in other languages, despite the fact that they are not particularly reader-friendly.

Rosenius continued until his death in 1868, after which the editorship was taken over by Paul Peter Waldenström. In contrast to Scott and his emphasis on more neutral subjects, Waldenström would publish his new view on the doctrine of the atonement, in conflict with the traditional Lutheran doctrine, in Pietisten in 1872. His view would find ground among Pietists and the Mission Friends in particular. In the last years, Pietisten's editorial staff included Janne Nyrén (1914–1915), Johan Peter Norberg (from 1916), Theodor Andersson (from 1917) and Jakob Emanuel Lundahl (1918).

600 copies were published in Pietisten's first year and around 10,000 copies were published between 1853 and 1865. The journal was for the Mission Friends but was widely popular among revivalists as a whole: selections were copied, translated, and published freely at the time. A Finland-Swedish version entitled Den evangeliska budbäraren ('The Evangelical Messenger') was also published.

Rosenius and Waldenström contributed to the founding of Evangeliska Fosterlandsstiftelsen (EFS, the Swedish Evangelical Mission, 1856) and the Svenska Missionsförbundet (SMF, Swedish Mission Covenant, 1878) respectively, the former a revivalist movement within the Church of Sweden, the latter a free church which split from EFS in part due to differing views on the atonement held by Waldenström and his followers. This contradiction led the EFS, in reaction to the founding of the SMF, to reissue the first fifteen volumes under the title Pietisten. Nytt och gammalt från nådens rike, which Rosenius had edited, while Pietisten under Waldenström became the official voice of the SMF in 1909 and was merged with the magazine Missionsförbundet in 1919.

== Pietisten (1986–present) ==
A namesake journal, self-described as the "spiritual heir" of the original Pietisten, has been published in Minneapolis, Minnesota, since its founding in 1986 by David Hawkinson and Peter Sandstrom.
