= Carl Olof Rosenius =

Swedish preacher and author (1816–1868)

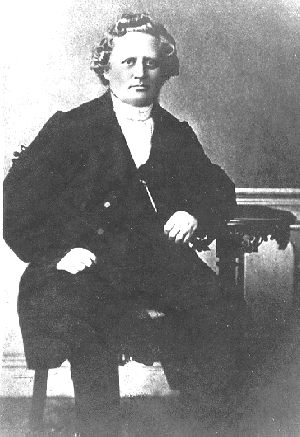
- Born: February 3, 1816; Nysätra, Västerbotten, Sweden
- Died: February 24, 1868 (aged 52); Stockholm, Sweden
- Burial place: St. John's Cemetery, Stockholm
- Occupations: preacher author editor
- Known for: Nyevangelism movement
- Spouse: Agatha Lindberg (m. 1843)
- Children: 7, including: Elisabeth Nyström (born 1848); Paul Josef Rosenius (born 1853)

Carl Olof Rosenius (3 February 1816 – 24 February 1868) was a Swedish lay preacher, author and editor of the monthly Pietisten (The Pietist) from 1842 to 1868. He was one of the country's most widely-heard preachers of his day and has been described as being of "extraordinary importance for the low-church evangelical revival not only in Sweden but also in the other Nordic countries".

== Biography ==
=== Family and childhood ===
Rosenius was born in Nysätra in Västerbotten while his father, Anders Rosenius, was serving there as a parish pastor. His mother, Sara Margareta Norenius, was the daughter of Olof Norenius, a clergyman. Before Rosenius was born, his mother dreamed that he would be used by God. He was the third child of seven. His six siblings included Eric Andreas – who died as an infant – another brother also named Eric Andreas, Claes Johan, Sara Magdalene, Margareta Eliana, and Martin Gabriel. Two of his brothers would later receive a theological education: Eric Andreas, who went by Anton, became a preacher, and Martin Gabriel became a theology professor at Lund University.

In Rosenius' home, religion was important; he received a religious education at an early age including the works of Martin Luther and Olov Svebilius. His father, a simple, evangelical man, supported the revival movement in Sweden as part of the Reader (läsare) movement, bringing it to Nysätra in 1814.

As a child, he found an early interest in spiritual matters. He was known to leave his friends while playing to walk alone in the forest and ponder the existence of God. Later, he was said to have tested whether God existed or not: putting a blindfold over his eyes, he tested whether God would guide his steps to the door of the barn. However, as he started to walk, a strange feeling made him stop – there he stood just at the edge of a deep well, and if he had walked any further, he would have fallen in. Rosenius took this as a sign from God. When Rosenius was thirteen, his family moved to the town of Sävar. They were poor and his parents sent the boys to the city in 1828. He attended school in Piteå, writing small, spiritually-themed letters even as a child.

=== Conversion and education ===
At the age of fifteen, he experienced a crisis of faith and religious breakthrough. Having read a translation of Erik Pontoppidan's Heller Glaubensspiegel, which states that even the most seemingly-zealous believer who knows the entire Bible and can even perform miracles can still go to hell without true faith, Rosenius was shaken and became sullen for some time. This experience impressed upon him the importance of conversion and a living faith. Rosenius' breakthrough was also influenced by Lutheran revivalist preacher Pehr Brandell.

While studying in Umeå as a teenager, he led conventicles or private religious gatherings, during school holidays. He was called "the second Luther" and "the little Reformer". Rosenius completed his gymnasium education in Härnösand. He planned to study theology in Uppsala, so to raise money for his education, he took a venia position through the Church of Sweden, a paid role which gave lay preachers the right to preach at certain parishes. In 1831, he received a preaching contract for a Reader congregation, which only read the works of Luther, in Röbäck near Umeå. He held small gatherings where he preached and read Luther. Bishop Frans Michael Franzén became familiar with the young Rosenius, seeing him as a promising preacher. A sermon that Rosenius delivered in Härnösand in 1833 is said to have impressed Franzén through its emphasis on the central Lutheran doctrine of justification by faith. He also assisted his father in preaching.

=== Spiritual guidance ===
Around this time, Rosenius first met traveling Reader lay preacher Maja-Lisa Söderlund while visiting his parents in the Burträsk area. She was twenty-two years his senior and supported him throughout his development at home as well as in Stockholm and Uppsala. He often wrote home to her when his courage failed him, as it often did during his student years. Söderlund was widely known in northern Västerbotten for her knowledge of the Bible and her ability to inspire hope in difficult times while the Conventicle Act severely restricted laymen's opportunities to preach outside the framework of the household. He referred to her as the "prophetess from Stor-Kåge". A number of spiritual sayings and advice in Rosenius' Nytt och Gammalt från Nådens Rike, eller Några Guds ord och Wishetens goda ordspråk Samlade af C. O. Rosenius 1838 are attributed to her, as well as an excerpt printed in the February 1844 edition of Pietisten.

=== Stockholm ===
In 1838 Rosenius began his theological studies at Uppsala University but was forced to give them up after a year due to failing health and financial difficulties. He instead found employment as a private tutor at Länna farm outside of Stockholm. At this point he was beset with serious religious doubts, including on the credibility of the Bible. In 1839, he met the Methodist minister George Scott in Stockholm, who had initially come to Sweden in 1830 to work as a preacher for British workers. However, Scott quickly learned Swedish and began revivalist preaching with a goal of inspiring spiritual renewal among the Swedish people in a manner that deemphasized religious sectarianism. Rosenius' conversations with Scott, in which he also analyzed the Bible, helped dispel his uncertainties and "made him understand the vital role of the Christian laymen and gave him a vision of unity across the denominational borders." In 1840, he was offered the opportunity to assist Scott in his ministry. It was unheard of at the time for a Lutheran preacher to work with a non-Lutheran for the purposes of evangelism. Regarding his ecumenical mission work, Rosenius stated:

Even if in the future I should work with Methodist preachers, it will only be on the grounds and conditions I have mentioned, namely that I may sacrifice my life and energies for Christ and his commandments, not for Wesley or Luther, who are dead, who were mere servants, and who would be no head of the church. I will sacrifice my life, my service for the one, holy, universal Church. If its members are childish enough to be called Pauline, Apollonian, Cephian – it will be all the same to me what name they take, as long as they belong to Christ. Then they are my brothers and I will serve them.

The opportunity marked a significant moment in Rosenius' life: he abandoned his plans of becoming a priest and moved to Stockholm to work with Scott at the newly built Engelska kapellet (English Chapel) near Hötorget (Haymarket Square). Rosenius traveled around Stockholm as a preacher and colporteur, preaching in homes and at times to the well-to-do in larger meeting rooms. Lars Paul Esbjörn, later founder of the Augustana Evangelical Lutheran Church, also worked with Scott at this time and was influenced by Rosenius. The same year, they met American preacher and temperance activist Robert Baird, who had come to work with Scott and Peter Wieselgren, another key temperance figure. In 1841, while Scott was on a fundraising trip in the United States, Rosenius took on a greater role and was responsible for the running of the church in his absence.

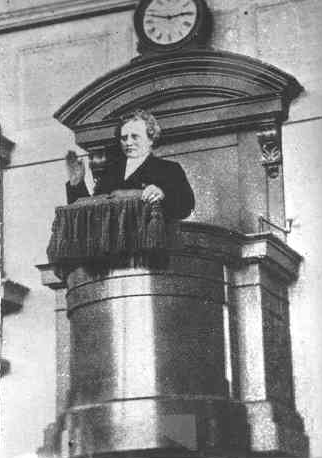
Rosenius preaching in Bethlehem Church, likely sometime around 1864–1867.

In 1842 Scott started the publication Pietisten to provide "practical edification without polemics", of which Rosenius was the editor. Its sales also helped support Rosenius financially. That year, however, increasing public controversy and threats over Scott's preaching forced him to leave Sweden, and the English Chapel ceased operations. Rosenius did not, however, curtail his activities, despite the fact that his preaching as a layman outside of the state church violated the Conventicle Act, in effect until 1858. He believed strongly in the priesthood of all believers and had a strong desire to preach when he had been called upon to by others. This led to him being summoned to the chief of police, but he continued preaching where he had been called. Rosenius' preaching work was financially supported by the non-denominational American and Foreign Christian Union. He became a leader in the growing religious revival of Sweden, traveling throughout the country, preaching both at private gatherings (conventicles) and in public halls. Rosenius did face doubts at this time, however, stating in a letter to future bishop of the Diocese of Lund, Johan Henrik Thomander, that he felt "to preach and to be 'in the vineyard among the people', would be more his calling than writing, but that he is 'not fit to be a priest'."

=== Preaching ===
Rosenius often preached extemporaneously. On hearing Rosenius, preacher Paul Petter Waldenström described his preaching in his Norrland dialect as natural and down-to-earth, with "no pompous words, no grandiose claims". Rosenius spoke calmly and did not preach loudly and emotionally or with dramatic gestures. Writer August Strindberg, upon seeing Rosenius preach, stated he "looked like peace and beamed with heavenly joy."

=== Marriage and family ===
On 2 August 1843, Rosenius married Agatha Lindberg in Umeå. The couple had seven children, including painter Elisabeth Nyström and Per Efraim Rosenius (1855–1932), who became a liberal journalist in Karl Staaff and Hjalmar Branting's circles.

=== Work with others ===
The same year, he wrote in Pietisten about his plans to form the Swedish Evangelical Alliance, an ecumenical organization where Christians could work together for the goal of evangelism despite denominational differences. When it was later formed, he joined the headquarters' board of directors. However, when Baptist Karl Justin Mathias Möllersvärd, working for the organization as a colporteur, began to promote rebaptism, Rosenius along with rector Per Magnus Elmblad left the board "as he did not want it to be perceived as a platform for Baptist propaganda".

In 1849, he helped found the Swedish Diaconal Institution, now known as Ersta diakoni, and supported mission work, colportage, and social work in Stockholm.

Rosenius was also a close friend of the "Reader Count" Adolphe Stackelberg at Stensnäs Manor. Together they started a parish in Västervik in 1854. This was the starting point for the evangelical revival in Kalmar County to organize missionary societies, which in turn eventually gave rise to the Östra Småland Missionary Society.

=== Later years ===
The Swedish Evangelical Mission, intended to bring together the different revival groups, was formed by Hans Jacob Lundborg in 1856. Rosenius supported its founding. A year later the organization bought the English Church's old building and reopened it as Bethlehem Church. Rosenius was able to work there as well as on numerous preaching trips throughout the country. He continued to edit and publish Pietisten, which went from 2,000 subscribers to 10,000 between 1850 and 1860. Readers – both laypeople and clergy – sought his advice; he received multiple letters a day. He published the journal until his death along with publishing and editing Missionstidningen and several other magazines. During his last years he wrote an extensive series of articles on the Epistle to the Romans that appeared in Pietisten. On Pentecost Sunday, 1867, Rosenius suffered a stroke in the pulpit of St. John's Church in Gothenburg. He died the following year. He is buried in St. John's Cemetery in Stockholm.

== Theology ==
Rosenius' Pietism, influenced by the Läsare (Reader) movement, the Herrnhuters (Moravian Brethren), and Methodism, retained key features of the northern Swedish religious revival – with the Bible as the Word of God, Lutheran objective atonement in Jesus Christ, and justification by grace alone at its core. He often found himself taking the middle ground between the subjectivity and emotionalism of the Moravian Brethren and the strictness of Pietism. In the Schartauan emphasis on the order of salvation, he suspected legalism; "come as you are!" was his message. He was on friendly terms with the Herrnhuters and had much in common with the Finnish evangelist Fredrik Gabriel Hedberg, despite believing that he went too far in the direction of antinomianism. Evidence of Scott's Methodist faith was more apparent in Rosenius' evangelistic work than in his theology. He had a strong dislike of Erik Janssonism.

He did not use Den svenska psalmboken, the Church of Sweden's hymnal, but rather song collections of a more personal religious nature, including those published by Oscar Ahnfelt. Hymns of his would, however, later be published in the church's 1921 supplement Nya psalmer. Throughout his life Rosenius remained a member of the Church of Sweden, baptizing his children and taking Communion in the state church and rejecting separatism and the free distribution of Communion.

== Legacy ==
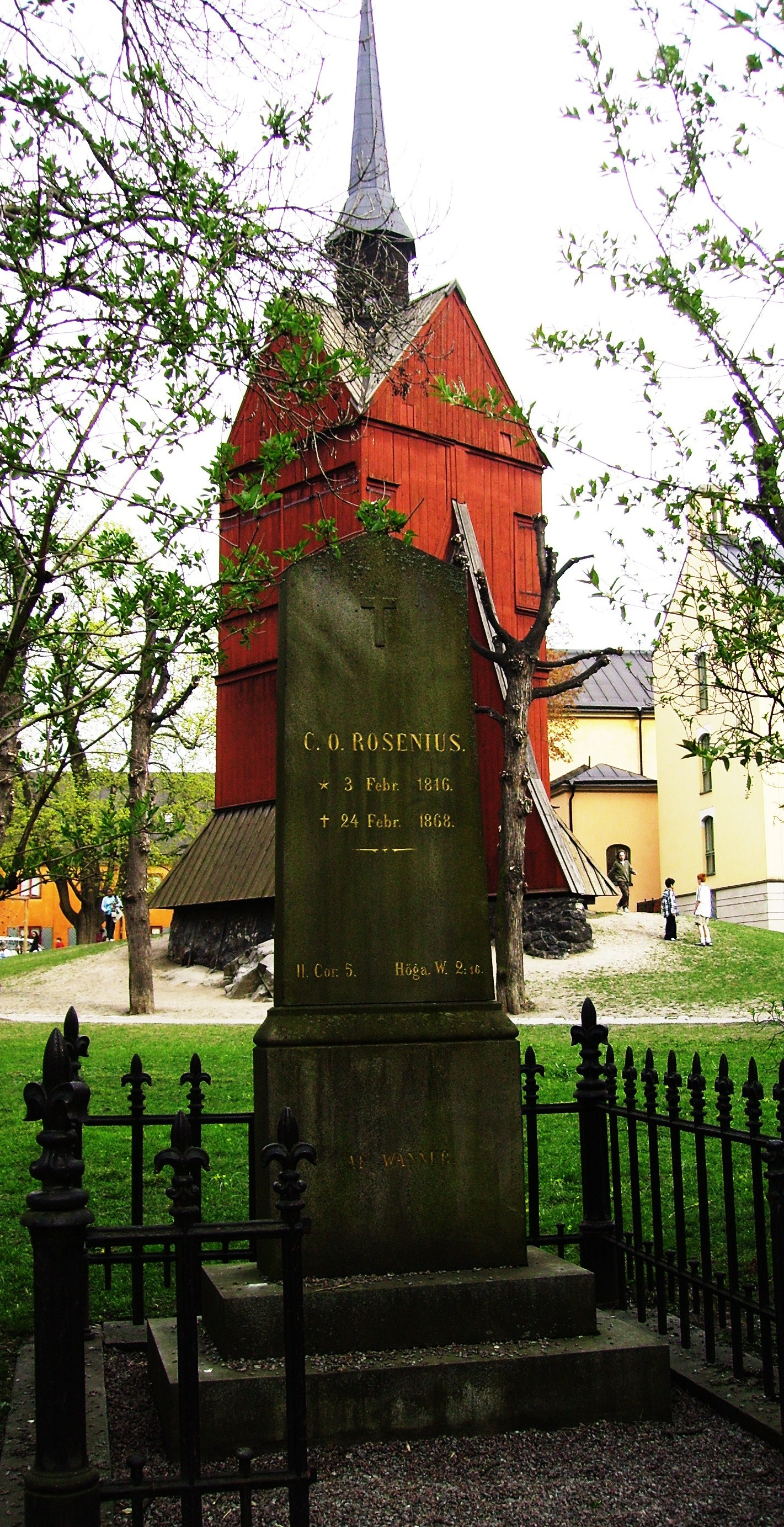
Rosenius' grave in Stockholm

Historian Hjalmar Holmquist has stated regarding Rosenius' legacy: "Since the Reformation, no single Swede has exerted such an extensive and profound influence on the religious and partly general physiognomy of our people as Rosenius".

Rosenius had a profound impact on Sweden's religious development during the 19th century, becoming one of the most strongly associated figures with the influential Nyevangelism ('New Evangelism') movement – although there is some debate about whether Rosenius came from this movement or it sprang from his beliefs. His commitment to personal involvement in religious belief affected not only the practices of the free church but also those of the state church, especially in northern and central Sweden.

Despite initial dismissal from large parts of the Church of Sweden, Rosenius became one of Sweden's most widely read religious writers at the time and a leading figure in the religious revival of the country. Rosenius' works were published extensively, with two million copies in Swedish and one million in other languages. Dagbetraktelserna accounts for 180,000 copies in 36 editions. This makes him one of Sweden's most widely read authors – only Selma Lagerlöf and August Strindberg are clearly more widely read.

His impact on the religious development of Norway was significant, with Norwegian theologian Olav Valen-Sendstad stating:

Norwegian Christianity owes a great spiritual debt of gratitude to Sweden for what we have received through Sweden's great prophet, Carl Olof Rosenius. The Rosenian revival in Norway at the end of the 19th century developed into a mission revival that has produced a number of significant preachers who have left extremely deep impressions in Norwegian Christian life. Rosenius will remain cherished and have a spiritual significance here in Norway as long as there is any living Christianity at all.

Rosenius' movement gained followers through the Mission Friends (Missionsvännerna) both within Sweden and abroad – particularly in Denmark (the Bornholmers) and Norway, as well as among Scandinavian settlers in the American Midwest. Among them was a lay preacher from Småland named Nicolaus Bergensköld, who immigrated to the United States in the 1860s and was a leader of the revivalist movement in the Scandinavian settlements of the American Midwest. Rosenius made a significant impact on the Swedish Lutherans – and to a lesser extent the Norwegian Lutherans – of the United States. His works were held in high esteem and reprinted by Lutheran leaders such as Tuve Hasselquist, Olof Olsson, and John N. Kildahl. He was also friends with and influenced Anders Wiberg, Per Palmqvist, and Gustaf Palmquist, Lutherans who became Baptist pioneers in Sweden and the United States. He had a great impact on the religious development of Mathilda Foy, an early innovator of Sunday school in Sweden known for her charitable work, who was introduced to Rosenius by Theodore Hamberg, a missionary equally captivated by his preaching.

He was also instrumental in the formation of Evangeliska Fosterlandsstiftelsen (The Swedish Evangelical Mission) as one of its co-founders.

Shortly after Rosenius' death, a large segment of his followers broke with his ecclesiastical views, led by Peter Paul Waldenström – his successor as publisher of Pietisten – and became separatists, founding the Swedish Mission Covenant.

A literary society, the Carl Olof Rosenius Society, was founded in 2017 to promote his writings and work and engage in research. As of 2019, it had 51 members and was planning to publish newly discovered manuscripts of 40 of Rosenius' sermons.

Rosenius Day, featuring lectures on Rosenius and the related revival movement, is held in August each year in Ånäset, where the Rosenius family home was located.

== Bibliography ==
- Carl Olof Rosenius at Kristnet
- Carl Olof Rosenius at Project Runeberg
- Rosenius' 1853 translation of The Pilgrim's Progress
- Missionsvännerna i Amerika by C. V. Bowman, (Minneapolis: Minneapolis Veckoblad, 1907)
- Daily Meditations by Carl Olof Rosenius, (Minneapolis: Lutheran Colportage Service, 1973)
- The Prayer of Faith by Carl Olof Rosenius and Warren M Ojala, (New Hampshire: Pietan Publications, 2010)
