= Nyevangelism =

Swedish Protestant movement

Nyevangelism (lit. 'New Evangelism') is a term for a branch of revivalist Protestant Christianity which emerged in Norrland, Sweden, at the beginning of the 19th century. The term, in opposition to Old Pietism (gammalpietism), has been in use since the 1850s.

== History ==
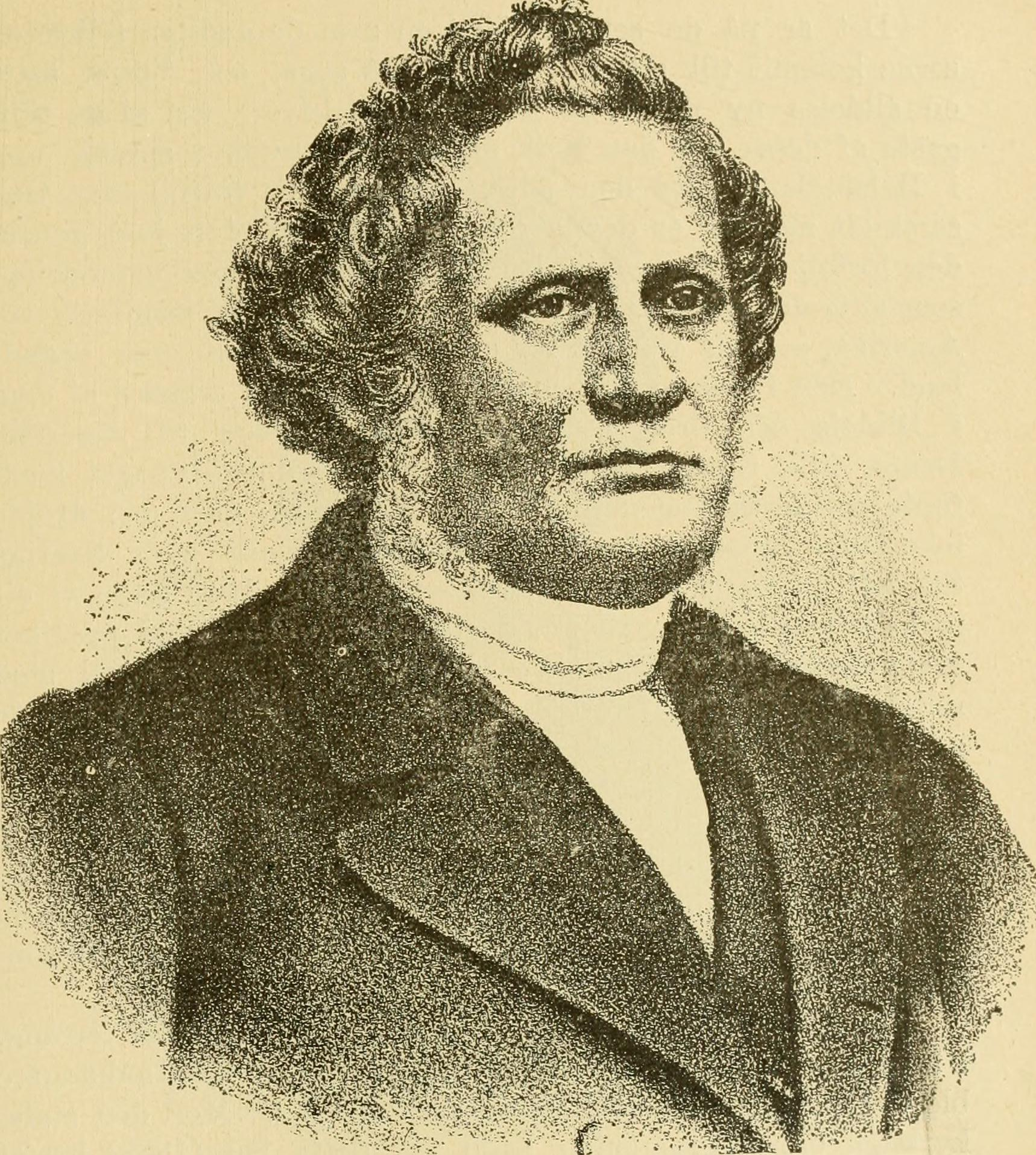
Carl Olof Rosenius

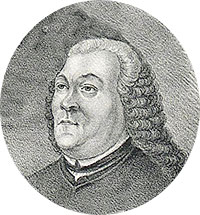
Anders Carl Rutström

Nyevangelism arose within the Lutheran Church of Sweden but was not limited to it: a free church, Baptist-influenced strand also existed. Danish scholar Finn Rønne notes different views on the movement's origin: it has been argued that it can be traced back to the teachings of strongly Moravian-influenced priest Anders Carl Rutström, while others posit it is an outgrowth of Carl Olof Rosenius' beliefs. The movement's beliefs can be somewhat difficult to define precisely. It was often congregationalist in governance with low-church aspects where personal commitment is important. It was characterized by independent preachers who traveled from place to place, often preaching somewhat emotionally tinged sermons.

The movement's foremost representative was Carl Olof Rosenius, who, in contrast to Enlightenment moralism and the emphasis on subjective conditions for salvation of Pietism and Schartauanism, placed Nyevangelism's emphasis on the work of atonement accomplished through Christ. Here Nyevangelism represented a return to the tenets of Luther; sometimes it was taken further, however, so that not only atonement but also justification was considered to have taken place with the death of Christ. Paul Petter Waldenström's new, more subjective doctrine of the atonement came as a reaction against this preaching of the gospel. Nevertheless, the term new evangelism came to be used also within the Mission Covenant Church of Sweden, founded in 1878 as the Svenska missionsförbundet when Waldenström's followers split off from the movement. "Come as you are" was a commonly used phrase in Nyevangelism.

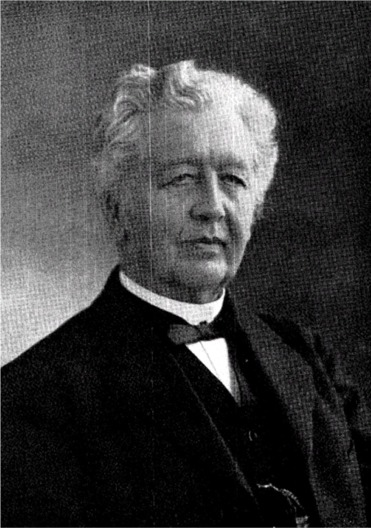
Paul Petter Waldenström

The movement existed throughout Sweden; however, it found less ground where other revivals had made an impact. Others associated with Nyevangelism in Sweden include Thor Hartwig Odencrants, Lars Vilhelm Henschen, and Adolphe Stackelberg. It reached Norway, Denmark, and Finland as well. It came to Norway in 1870, with some aspects adopted by revival movements such as Haugeanism; preachers such as Paul Gerhard Sand and Johannes Jørgensen were associated with the movement. Excerpts from Rosenius' and George Scott's periodical Pietisten were circulated in the country. In Denmark, Bornholm became the center of Nyevangelism. In Finland, early Baptist founders such as Anna Heikel were also influenced by it.

== See also ==
- Läsare – revival movement influenced by Nyevangelism
- Mission Friends
- Radical Pietism
- Shouter movement
- Swedish Evangelical Mission
- Baptist Union of Sweden
