= Adolphe Stackelberg =

Swedish count and Christian revivalist

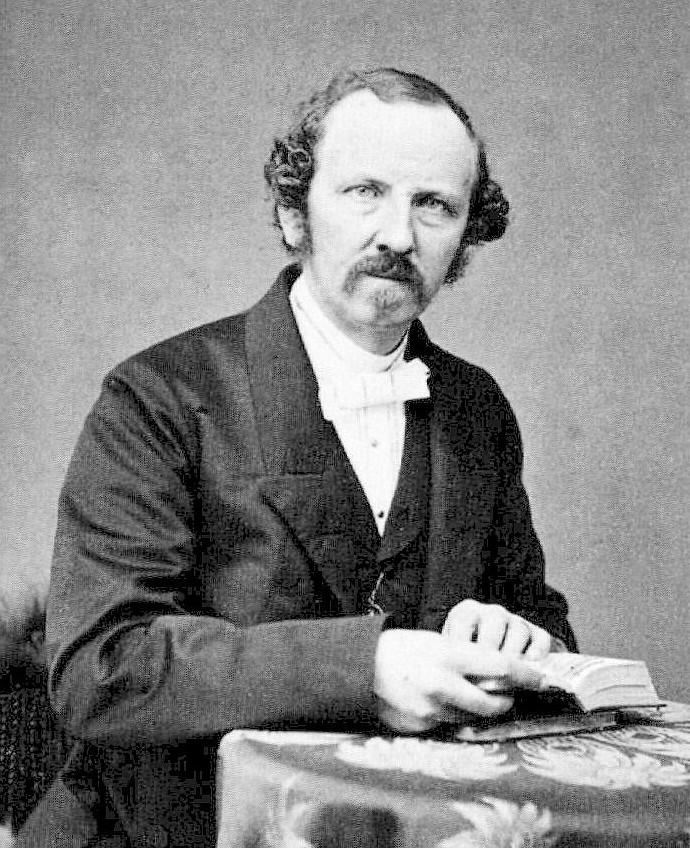
- Born: Reinhold Adolphe Louis Stackelberg; 30 June 1822
- Died: 22 January 1871 (aged 48)
- Known for: Activity in the Småland Christian revival movement
- Title: Count
- Movement: Läsare (Reader) movement
- Spouse: Honorée (Honorine) Adelswärd (m. 1847)

Reinhold Adolphe Louis Stackelberg (30 June 1822 – 22 January 1871) was a Swedish count (greve), estate owner, and metalworking plant owner as well as one of the firebrands of the Christian revival movement in Småland.

== Biography ==
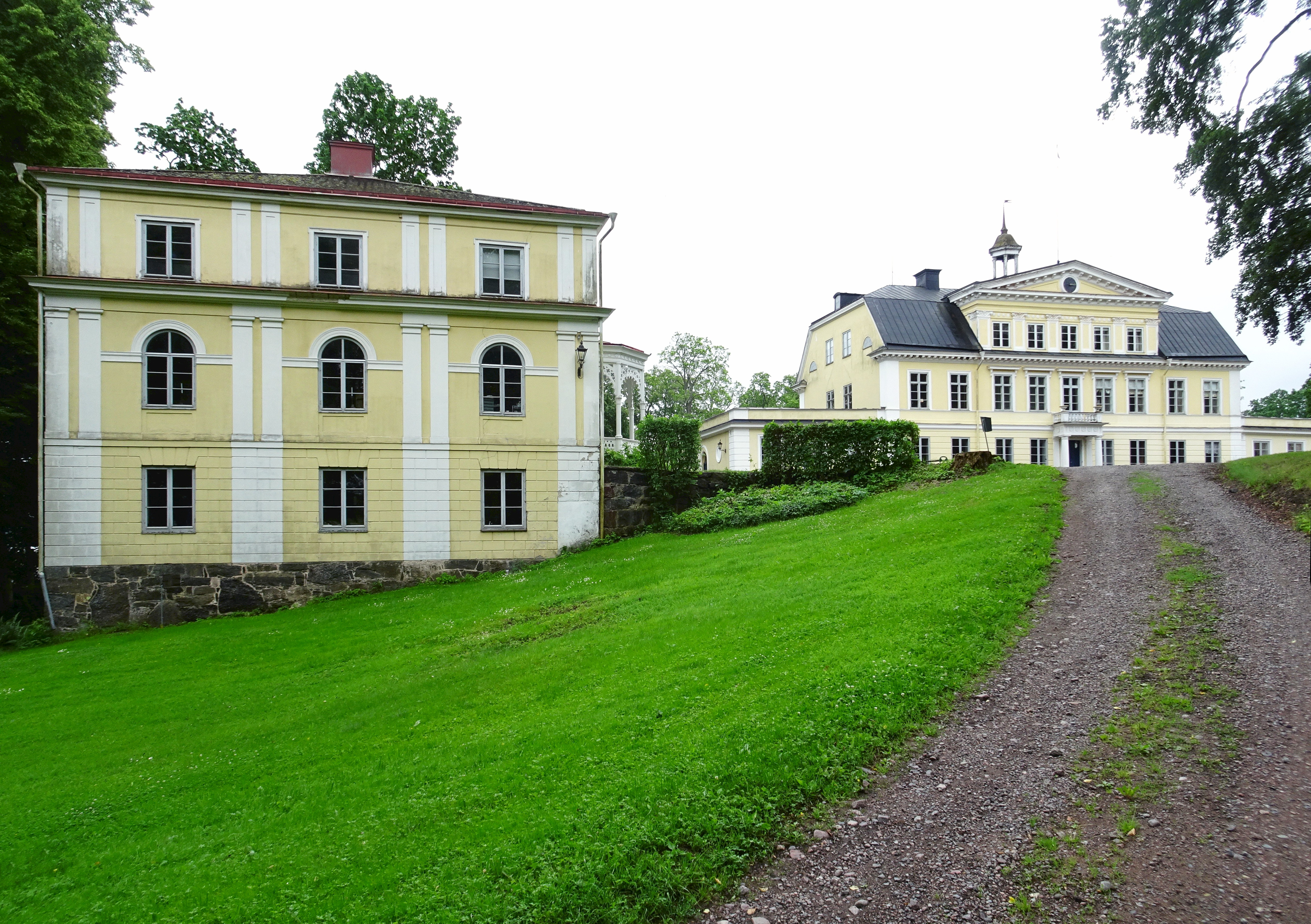
Stensnäs north wing with the main building in the background, July 2021.

Adolphe Stackelberg was born in 1822 in Hjo, Sweden, to Chief Valet de chambre Count Carl Adolf Ludvig Stackelberg and Eva Sofia Adelswärd and grew up in Almnäs. He was the 14th child in his family. He was born into a noble family, which, however, lacked considerable wealth. He attended Uppsala University, graduating in 1840. Despite his family's lack of wealth, Stackelberg managed to marry Honorée (Honorine), his cousin and the daughter of the very wealthy baron Jan Carl Adelswärd. The wedding took place on 30 August 1847 and Adelswärd gave the couple Stensnäs Manor in Västervik and its estate.

In the 1840s Stackelberg experienced a crisis of faith and soon found himself in revivalist Carl Olof Rosenius' Nyevangelism ('New Evangelism') movement. He was deeply religious and began early to think about how he could best provide for the spiritual welfare of his workers. He began to hold prayer meetings in ever-widening circles and invited spiritual speakers of various kinds to his home. This earned Stackelberg the nickname the Reader (läsare) Count. In the northern wing of Stensnäs is the hall where Stackelberg held his famous edification meetings in the mid-19th century. At this time, the Conventicle Act was still in effect, outlawing religious gatherings and lay preaching held outside the Church of Sweden.

In 1852, Stackelberg met Rosenius for the first time, which was the beginning of a lifelong friendship. In 1854 they established a joint congregation in Västervik. He preached at the church and hired an assistant preacher: initially Peter Fjellstedt served in that role but left not long after and was replaced by K. P. Gustafsson. In the autumn of 1855, the evangelical revivalists in Kalmar County also began to organize into missionary societies. This was the beginning of the Östra Småland Missionary Society. He also worked with priests Hans Jakob Lundborg and Bernhard Wadström as well as with the Swedish Evangelical Mission (Evangeliska Fosterlandsstiftelsen).

Unlike some branches of the revivalists, Stackelberg was not a separatist. He remained part of the established church, also receiving permission to preach in the church from the bishop.

In 1860 Stackelberg also inherited the Överum mill from his parents-in-law. There, he had a mobile church built that could be moved on rails. Nicolaus Bergensköld, who later emigrated to the United States and became a leading figure in the Swedish rural missionary movement (Mission Friends), preached in this church from 1865 to 1867. Later Stackelberg also built a permanent church on the mill square at his own expense. However, this was not completed until after his death and was consecrated by Ebbe Gustaf Bring on 18 August 1872.

Never in the best of health, Stackelberg died on 22 January 1871 after a period of illness; Fjellstedt officiated at his funeral. He is buried in Ukna cemetery.
