= Stackelberg family =

Former noble family

Stackelberg
- Baltic German noble family
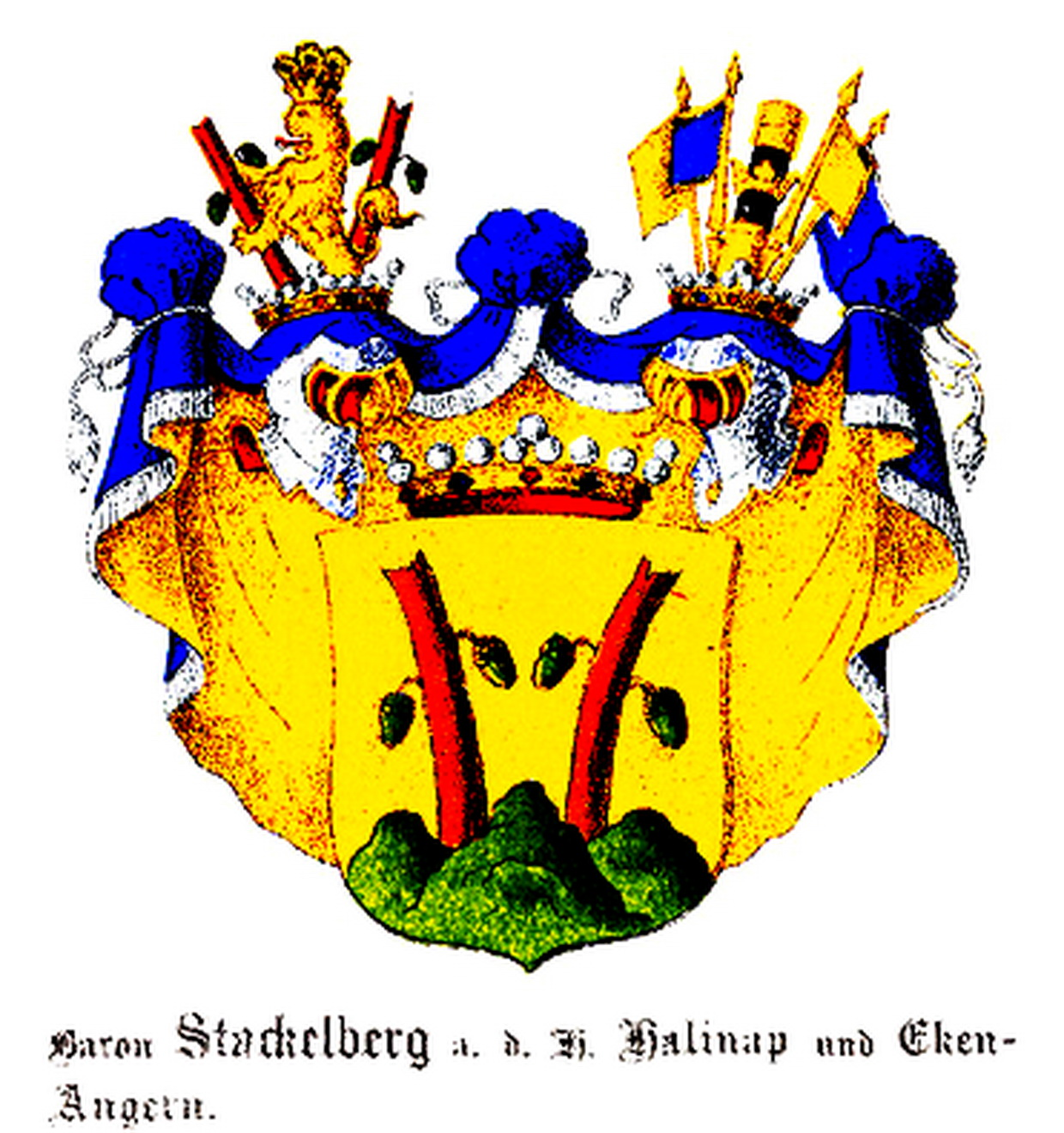
- Current region: Northern Europe (mainly Finland, Germany and Sweden)
- Titles: Freiherr; Count

The Stackelberg family (Russian: Штакельберг, romanized: Stakelberg; Latvian: Štakelbergi), also spelled Stakelberg, is an old and influential Baltic German noble family, represented at the Swedish, Russian and Finnish houses of nobility.

== History ==
The family was first mentioned in 1244 in Cologne in a written document with Waldewerus de Stackelberg and in 1306 in Riga with Henricus de Stackelberg. They were mentioned as vassals of the Prince-Bishops of Dorpat.

The family members were raised to the rank of Baron in 1714 and later in 1727 to the rank of Count in Sweden. They were also awarded with the title of Count of the Holy Roman Empire in 1776 and in 1786. The title of Baron in Russian Empire was granted to them on 7 December 1854.

Different branches of the Stackelberg family use different surnames; for instance, a nobiliary particle preposition i.e. von. The Stackelberg family used to be one of the biggest landowning families in the Baltic region.

== Notable members ==
- Berndt Otto Stackelberg (1662–1734), Swedish field marshal
- Berndt Robert Gustaf Stackelberg (1784–1845), Swedish military officer, diplomat and governor of Saint Barthélemy
- Count Ernst von Stackelberg (1813–1870), Russian general and a diplomat
- Count Gustav Ernst von Stackelberg (1766–1850), Russian diplomat
- Count Otto Magnus von Stackelberg (1732–1800), Russian ambassador
- Baron Otto Magnus von Stackelberg (1786–1837), Russian archaeologist
- Count Reinhold Adolphe Louis Stackelberg (1822–1871), Swedish Christian revivalist preacher
