= Gustav Ernst von Stackelberg =

Russian diplomat (1766 –1850)

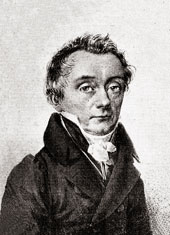
Count Gustav Ernst von Stackelberg

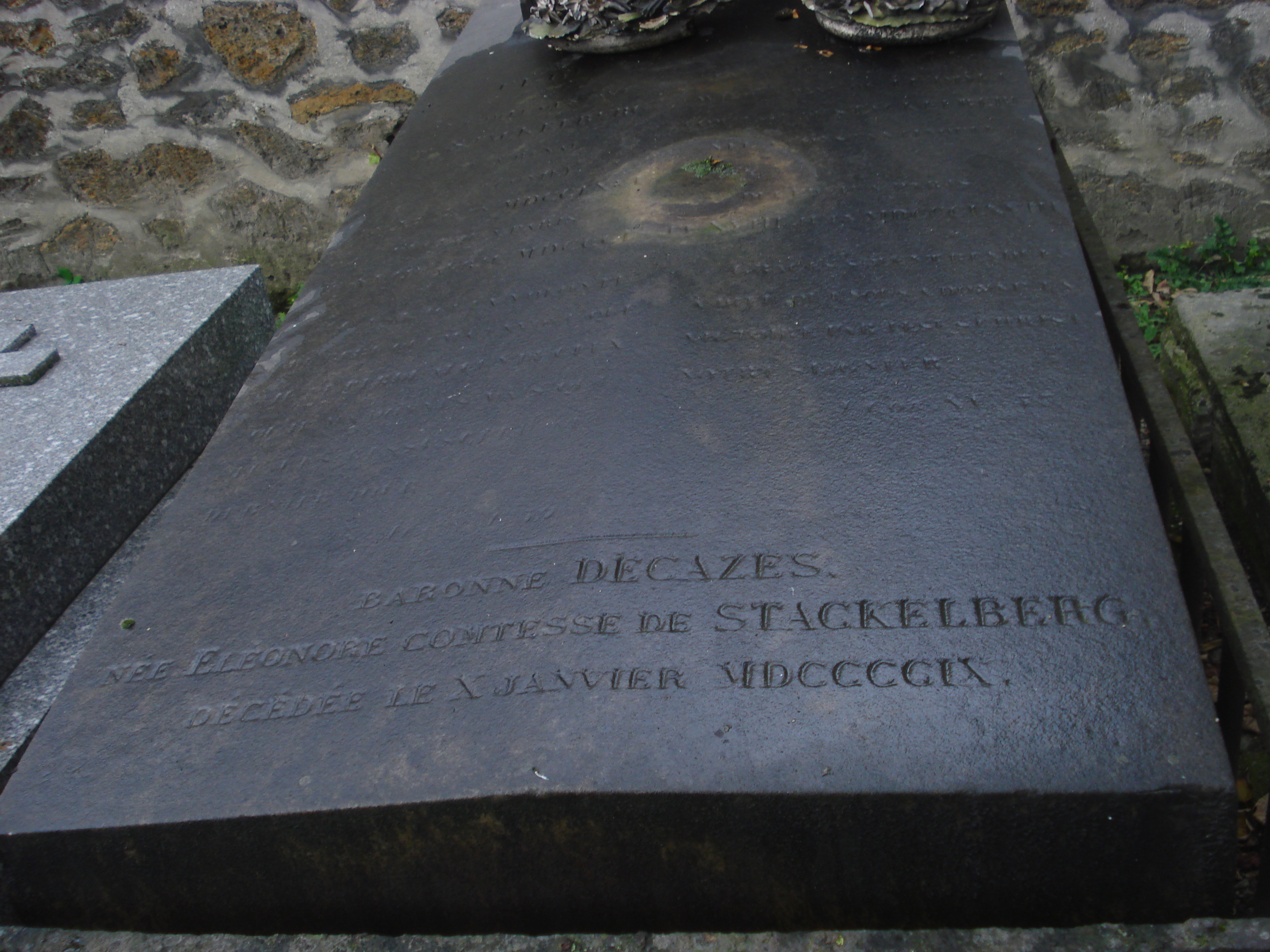
Grave

Graf Gustav Ernst von Stackelberg (Russian: Густав Оттонович Стакельберг; 5 June 1766, Reval, Governorate of Estonia – 18 April 1850, Paris, France) was a Russian diplomat of Baltic-German descent. He was the son of Otto Magnus von Stackelberg. By birth, he was member of the House of Stackelberg.

== Life ==
As a Lieutenant in the Russian armed forces he fought in the Russo-Swedish War against King Gustav III of Sweden. After he left the army, he became a diplomat of the Russian court, initially as a chamber junker of Empress Catherine the Great.

From 1794 he was the Russian ambassador to the Kingdom of Sardinia, from 1799 in Switzerland, from 1802 in the Batavian Republic, from 1807 in Prussia and from 1810 in Austria.

After the defeat of France in the Napoleonic Wars, as ambassador to the Austrian Empire he was a member of the Russian delegation to the Congress of Vienna (1814–15) along with prince Razumovski, count Nesselrode and count Capo d Istria. In this capacity he was pivotal in the absorption of most of the Duchy of Warsaw into the Russian Empire as the Kingdom of Poland.

After a long career as a diplomat, he was awarded the Order of St. Andrew, and spent his retirement in Paris, where he died in 1850.
