= Ethiopian Kale Heywet Church =

Evangelical denomination headquartered in Addis Ababa, Ethiopia

- Classification: Evangelical Protestant
- Orientation: Evangelical
- Theology: Evangelicalism, Baptist
- Associations: Evangelical Church Fellowship of Ethiopia
- Headquarters: Addis Ababa, Ethiopia (International); Chicago, Illinois, United States (North America)
- Origin: 1927
- Congregations: 11,000
- Members: 10 million
- Official website: ekhc.net

The Ethiopian Kale Heywet Church (የኢትዮጵያ ቃለ ሕይወት ቤተ-ክርስቲያን Yä-'itəyop̣əya Qalä Ḥəywät Betä-Kərəstiyan lit. 'The Ethiopian Word of Life Church') is an evangelical denomination, headquartered in Addis Ababa, Ethiopia.

== History ==
The Ethiopian Kale Heywet Church was founded in 1927 in southern Ethiopia by the evangelical missionary organization Sudan Interior Mission and Dr. Thomas Alexander Lambie.

The first missionaries had initially planned a trip into the western part of Ethiopia, but after prayer felt that they were being led to the South Central area. The early missionary work was concentrated among the Wolaita, Kambaata, Hadiya and Sidama peoples, which are the three most densely populated awrajas (regions) in Ethiopia. At Dembi Dollo, Lambie worked with an Ethiopian evangelist named Gidada Solon.

The few missionaries who entered the country all had to leave during the country's invasion by the Italians. They left a handful of believers with the translation of portions of scriptures and the Gospel of Mark. What the missionaries returned after the five-year occupation of the country, the handful of believers had become thousands, and the fledgling congregation was very strong. Planting this church in Ethiopia cost the lives of three of the earliest missionaries. Nearly 100 missionaries worked for about ten years before they left the country during the invasion.

Returning missionaries, aside from church planting in unreached areas, provided biblical and theological teachings to the growing church. Since 1974, the Ethiopian Kale Heywot Church Development Commission, a church-related humanitarian aid organization, has supported schools in the south and west of the country by providing teacher salaries, books, tables and chairs.

== Statistics ==
In 2013, it had a reported 7,774 churches and 6.7 million members. In 2020, the Church had 9 million members, 10,000 churches, nine theological schools and 145 Bible schools.

== Beliefs ==
The Church has an Evangelical confession of faith, based on its Baptist roots.

== See also ==
- Christianity in Ethiopia
