= Paul Petter Waldenström =

Swedish priest and politician (1838–1917)

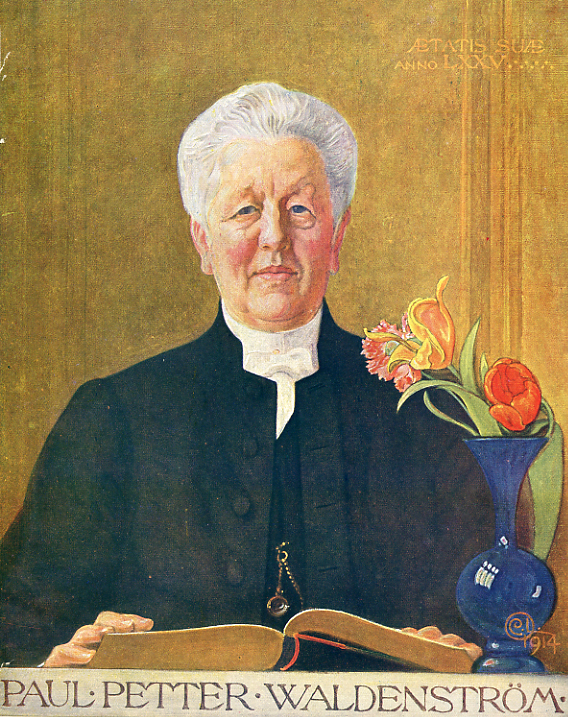
- P. P. Waldenström painted in 1914 by Carl Larsson
- Born: 20 July 1838; Luleå, Sweden
- Died: 14 July 1917 (aged 78); Lidingö, Sweden
- Education: Uppsala University
- Occupations: Priest, theologian, writer, free church leader

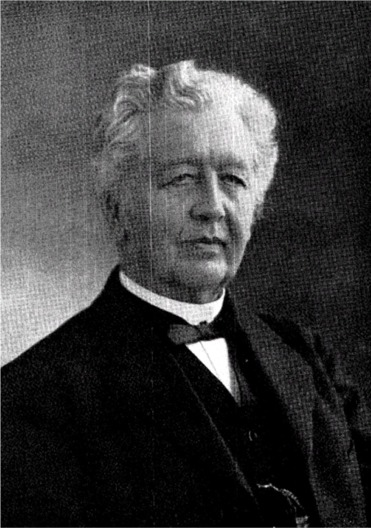
P. P. Waldenström

Paul Petter Waldenström (alternately spelled "Paul Peter") (20 July 1838 – 14 July 1917) was a Swedish lecturer, priest in the Church of Sweden and theologian, member of the Riksdag, and writer, who became the most prominent leader of the free church movement in late 19th-century Sweden.

== Biography ==
=== Upbringing and education ===
Waldenström was born in Luleå in northern Sweden, son of district physician Erik Magnus Waldenström and Margareta Magdalena Govenius. His siblings include physician Johan Anton, jurist Alfred and mayor Hugo Waldenström.

He moved to Uppsala in 1855, beginning his academic studies at Uppsala University two years later; he received his Ph.D. there in 1863, and was ordained a priest the following year. He had been employed as an adjunct in the Växjö högre allmänna läroverk (the secondary school in Växjö) already in 1862 and in 1864; when his doctorate qualified him for this, he received a lecturership in Christianity, Greek and Hebrew at the secondary school in Umeå. From 1874 until 1905 he was lecturer in the same subjects at the secondary school in Gävle. He was awarded a Doctor of Theology degree from Yale University in 1889 and was awarded the laurel for a second time as a jubeldoktor ('jubilee doctor') in Uppsala in 1913.

=== Work in the free church movement ===
Although he worked as a school teacher his whole life, Waldenström's notability comes from his work as a theologian, editor of Christian periodicals, and a preacher. In 1857 he underwent a religious crisis, joining the Nyevangelism ('new evangelism') and Läsare ('reader') movements. In the early 1860s he was invited by the Swedish-American Augustana Lutheran Synod to work at its college, but declined. On the death of revivalist and founder of the Swedish Evangelical Mission [Evangeliska fosterlandsstiftelsen] Carl Olof Rosenius in 1868, Waldenström became editor of Pietisten, a publication founded by Rosenius and Methodist George Scott and associated with the free church movement. This proved to be very influential both in Sweden and abroad; Waldenström "emerged as the foremost leader of Mission Friends in Sweden" at this time and had a strong influence among American Mission Friends – some of whom would later become the Evangelical Covenant Church.

He was long a leading member of the Swedish Evangelical Mission, a movement within the state church. In 1872 Waldenström developed his doctrine of atonement – stating that humanity was reconciled to God rather than the opposite – and came into conflict with the Church's doctrine, "[setting] off a storm of controversy". However, it brought him significant influence among Pietists. His conflicts with the Church of Sweden also extended to Eucharistic theology as he was a member of an association calling for the celebration of communion outside of the church's services. In 1876 he was dismissed as the provincial representative of the Swedish Evangelical Mission after celebrating a private communion service in Uppsala. He also argued for the use of the Bible alone as the source of doctrine as opposed to the Formula of Concord and Augsburg Confession. These factors led to his resignation from the priesthood in 1882. He then served as preacher at Immanuel Church in Stockholm and traveled to North America, where he had a number of followers.

Together with Erik Jakob Ekman (1842–1915), he founded the Swedish Mission Covenant (Svenska Missionsförbundet) in 1878, which in 2011 became part of the Uniting Church in Sweden. From the beginning, Waldenström was one of its main leaders, though he was not present at the meeting when the association was founded. The church long had an ambivalent relationship to the state church, torn between the relative moderation of Waldenström and the greater radicalism of the first president, Ekman, and his followers. After Ekman's resignation in 1904, Waldenström became its president, retiring from his lectureship in Gävle. He would also later serve as mission director and was director for a time of its pastoral seminary at Lidingö.

=== Theological contributions ===
Waldenström's influence can be partially summed up in the maxim often associated with his movement: "where is it written?" (Swedish: Var står det skrivet?). This cry reflects his passion for the Bible. The fact that Waldenström spent 11 years translating the New Testament from Greek to Swedish shows his devotion to the texts. His influence is not limited to translation and exegesis; he also wrote on a variety of theological topics and became a key figure in the Nyevangelism movement.

He wrote a book titled Baptism and Infant Baptism (Swedish: Dop och Barndop). But perhaps his greatest legacy is his understanding of justification and atonement. He rejected the prevailing notion on the atonement, the objective atonement, that God's wrath was satisfied by the cross because it made God the object of reconciliation and lacked scriptural support. He instead asserted his teachings on the subjective atonement: that humanity, not God, was the object of the atonement; that God was the initiator, not the recipient, of the work of reconciliation in Christ.

=== Political career ===
Waldenström had liberal political leanings but remained nonpartisan. He served as mayor of Gävle and county governor in the 1880s. From 1884 to 1905, Waldenström was a member of the Riksdag's lower house (Andra kammaren), elected in the Gävle city constituency, where he focused on church and temperance issues. He was a member of the constitutional committee, the law committee and a number of other committees. He was also a lay representative at the church meetings in 1868 and 1905.

=== Family ===
Waldenström married Matilda Fredrika Teodora Hallgren (born 1848 in Låssa, Uppsala County). In 1890, they had six children. Waldenström was the father of jurist Esaias Waldenström, lawyer Johannes Waldenström and lawyer Martin Waldenström, as well as the grandfather of business leader Erland Waldenström and the great-grandfather of television host Hans Waldenström.

=== Death ===
Waldenström died at his home at the seminary in Lidingö on 14 July 1917. He was buried with great ceremony on 20 July 1917 by former colleague, rector Gustav Mosesson, who performed the first lay burial, which was immediately followed by a traditional burial.

== Writings ==
Waldenström published a large number of widely distributed and widely read Christian books. His writing activities began in the weekly periodical Stadsmissionären in 1862, where he published some twenty spiritual songs and his spiritual allegory Brukspatron Adamsson, in the vein of Bunyan's The Pilgrim's Progress, later translated as Squire Adamsson.

=== Hymns ===
- "Fröjda dig och sjung, mitt hjärta", composed 1862, no. 419 in the Swedish Mission Covenant's Sånger och psalmer 1951, after a 1950 adaptation
- "Se Guds rena lamm", composed 1862, no. 149 in the Swedish Mission Covenant's Sånger och psalmer 1951
- "O, vad sällhet det är", composed 1866, no. 423 in the Swedish Mission Covenant's Sånger och psalmer 1951

=== Selected works ===
- Nya Testamentet. Ny öfversättning med förklarande anmärkningar. Pietistens expedition, Centraltryckeriet, 1886. 2 volumes. 2nd revised ed. 1892
- Guds ewiga frälsningsråd. Betraktelse öfwer 1 Kor 1:30. Pietistens expedition. 3 volumes 1882. 54 reflections.
- Predikningar öfwer Swenska kyrkans nya högmessotexter. With C. O. Rosenius. Vol. 1, 2nd ed. 1874.
- Predikningar öfwer Swenska kyrkans nya högmessotexter. With C. O. Rosenius. Vol. 2, 2nd ed. 1879.
- Genom norra Amerikas Förenta stater: reseskildringar. Chicago, Illinois, The Mission Friends Publishing Co. 1890, viii, 615, 3 p., respectively Stockholm: Pietisten, 1890, viii, 615, (1) p., ill.
- Brukspatron Adamsson eller Hvar bor du? Illustrated by Jenny Nyström. Pietistens expedition, 5 ed. 1891.
- Till Österland: skildringar från en resa i Turkiet, Grekland, Syrien, Palestina, Egypten samt på Sinaihalfön hösten och vintern 1894. Stockholm: Nornan, 1895–1896, 800, viii s, respective 1900–1901, 800 p.
- Stycken af Lifwets Ord. Ett bibelord med utläggning för hwar dag i året. Pietistens expedition. 1898
- Davids Psalmer med utläggning. Part 1. 1900.
- Nya färder i Amerikas förenta stater: reseskildringar med 190 illustrationer. Stockholm: Nornan, 1902–1903, 540 p.
- Genom Canada. Reseskildringar från 1904. Stockholm: Nornan, 1905, 99 p.
- Till Kina: Reseskildringar. Stockholm: Nornan, 1907–1908, 356 p.
- Herren är from. Betraktelser öfwer Davids 25:te Psalm. Pietistens expedition. 1876
- Herren är from. Betraktelser öfwer Davids 25:te Psalm. Pietistens expedition. New revised and partly adapted ed. 1915.
- Herren är from. Betraktelser öfwer Davids 25:te Psalm. Pietistens expedition. New revised and partly adapted ed. 1918.
