= Sven Lidman =

Sven Lidman is the name of:

- Sven Lidman (clergyman) (1786–1845), clergyman, antiquarian and orientalist, dean of the cathedral of Linköping
- Sven Lidman (writer) (1882–1960), writer, leading member of the Pentecostal movement in Sweden
- Sven Lidman (lexicographer) (1921-2011), lexicographer
