= Lidman =

Lidman is a surname. Notable people with the surname include:

- David Louis Lidman (1905–1982), American writer about philately
- Dick Lidman (born 1967), Swedish former footballer
- Håkan Lidman (1915–2000), Swedish hurdler
- Sara Lidman (1923–2004), Swedish writer
- Sven Lidman (clergyman), (1786–1845), Swedish clergyman
- Sven Lidman (lexicographer) (1921–2011), Swedish lexicographer, son of the writer Sven Lidman
- Sven Lidman (writer) (1882–1960), Swedish military officer, poet, writer, and preacher
