= Åke Green =

Swedish Pentecostal Christian pastor (born 1948)

- Church: Swedish Pentecostal Movement

Personal details
- Born: 3 June 1941 Vingåker, Sweden
- Denomination: Christianity

Åke Green (Swedish: [ˈǒːkɛ ˈɡreːn]; born 3 June 1941) is a Swedish Pentecostal Christian pastor who was prosecuted, but acquitted, under Sweden's law against hate speech because of critical opinions on homosexuality in his sermons. The district court found him guilty and sentenced him to one month in prison. The sentence was appealed to the court of appeals (hovrätt). On 11 February 2005, the Göta Court of Appeal overturned the decision and acquitted Åke Green. On 9 March, the Prosecutor-General (Riksåklagaren) appealed this decision to the Supreme Court, which on 29 November also acquitted.

The Supreme Court stated that Åke Green had violated Swedish law as it currently stands regarding agitation against groups, and that the constitutionally guaranteed freedom of expression as well as freedom of religion does not protect him. However, the Supreme Court also stated that the freedom of expression as well as freedom of religion provided by the European Convention on Human Rights, which is superior to normal Swedish law according to the lex superior principle regarding the ECHR found in the Instrument of Government (Regeringsformen) 2:19, gives him protection, since jurisprudence shows that a conviction would probably not be upheld by the European Court.

== Background ==
In 2002, the Riksdag included references to sexual orientation in a list of groups protected against persecution in the form of threats and expressions of disdain. The list appears in a section of Swedish Criminal Code (Brottsbalken) known as "agitation against a population group" (hets mot folkgrupp).

== The sermon ==
At his church in Borgholm in 2003, Green delivered a sermon in which he described "sexual perversions" (referencing homosexuality) as "abnormal, a horrible cancerous tumor in the body of society." He also said that a person cannot be a Christian and a homosexual at the same time.

Green had invited members of the media to attend the sermon, but none were present when he preached it in the presence of about fifty listeners. He wrote a summary of the sermon, including the above-mentioned quotes, which was printed in the local newspaper Ölandsbladet. A representative of nearby Kalmar's RFSL, an LGBT equal rights organization, reported the sermon to the police and the controversy began.

== Controversy ==
The district court found Åke Green guilty and sentenced him to one month in prison. The sentence was appealed to the court of appeals (hovrätt) and Green's lawyer maintained his client's religious freedom had been violated. On 11 February 2005 Göta hovrätt overturned the decision and acquitted Åke Green. On 9 March, the Prosecutor-General (Riksåklagaren) appealed this decision to the Supreme Court, which on 29 November also acquitted him.

The Supreme Court stated that Åke Green had violated Swedish hate speech law (Lagen om hets mot folkgrupp). A conviction would probably not be upheld by the European Court considering Article 9 of the European Convention on Human Rights, which covers freedom of religion. After a discussion of the case law regarding Article 9 and 10 the court stated: "Under these circumstances, it is likely that the European Court, in a determination of the restriction of Åke Green’s right to preach his Biblically based opinion that a judgment of conviction would constitute, would find that this restriction is not proportionate, and would therefore be a violation of the European Convention on Human Rights."

The sentence has raised a controversy all around the world, with disputes between those who see it as a victory for human rights and freedom from intolerance, and those who see it as an attack on religious freedom and the right to free speech, which in themselves are both regarded as human rights.

Green became a cause celebre for anti-gay preacher Fred Phelps, who has labelled anyone who held the belief that God could love non-elect sinners as being eternally damned. Nonetheless, Phelps installed a monument praising Green on his website. Green subsequently denounced Phelps. "I think it is appalling that people say things like that," Green said, "it is extremely unpleasant." In response, Phelps and his organization, the Westboro Baptist Church, denounced Green as a traitor and an ingrate, and he later removed the Green tribute from his website.

Åke Green was also supported by Ulf Ekman of Livets Ord and Robert Vesterlund's Info-14.

Responding to the sentence, Sören Andersson, the president of Swedish Federation for Lesbian, Gay, Bisexual and Transgender Rights (RFSL), said that religious freedom could never be used as a reason to persecute people.

== Temperance organisations ==
In the beginning of 2008 the organisation IOGT-NTO, a Swedish temperance movement, decided to withdraw Åke Green's membership, stating that his statements about homosexuality conflict with IOGT-NTO's bylaws.

Instead, Green became an adherent of the Christian temperance movement, the "Blue ribbon" Blå bandet aligned with the International Blue Cross. He was involved in another controversy following the announcement that he was to hold a speech at a common manifestation together with the Social Democrats on 1 May 2008, in Vänersborg. The Social Democrats excluded members of the Blue Ribbon, including Green, after several protests, some of which were published in Vänersborgs local newspaper, TTELA.

== See also ==
- Bibeltemplet, A parallel case also in Sweden
- Christianity and homosexuality
- Toleration
