= Nyhem Week =

Nyhem Week Nyhemsveckan
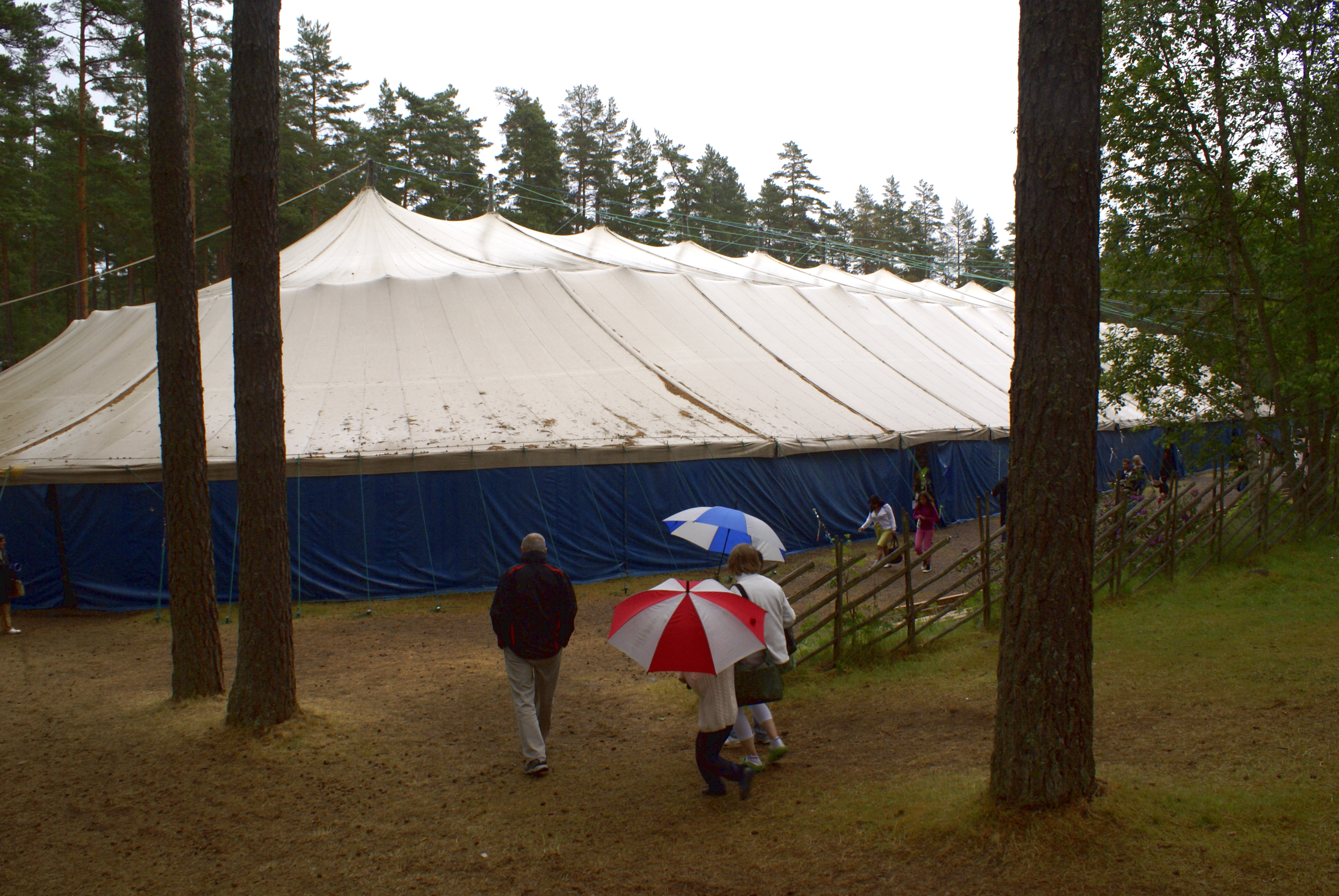
- The tent during the Nyhem Week of 2008, the final year a tent was used
- Venue: Nyhemshallen
- Location: Nyhem
- Country: Sweden
- Inaugurated: 1917-

The Nyhem Week (Swedish: Nyhemsveckan) is a major annual conference by the Swedish Pentecostal Movement. It occurs during the Midsummer week every year in Nyhem in Mullsjö Municipality, Sweden. It was first held in 1917. It is hosted by the Mullsjö-Nyhem Pentecostal Congregation.

Until 2008 the conference were held inside a large tent. Since 2009 the conference has been instead held inside Nyhemshallen.

== See also ==
- Vineyard Norden Summercamp
