= Lapland Week =

Lapland Week Lapplandsveckan
- Location: Husbondliden
- Country: Sweden
- Inaugurated: 1919-

The Lapland Week (Swedish: Lapplandsveckan) is a major annual conference by the Swedish Pentecostal Movement. It occurs in June–July every year in Husbondliden in Lycksele Municipality, Sweden. It was first held in 1919 as a Bible studies week.

The event is one of the larger Christian festivals in northern Sweden.
