= Filadelfia Stockholm =

Pentecostal congregation in Stockholm, Sweden

Filadelfia Stockholm is the largest Pentecostal congregation in the Swedish Pentecostal movement with about 5,400 members as of 2015. It is also the largest Pentecostal congregation in Europe. It owns the Filadelfia Church building at Rörstrandsgatan 7 in Stockholm, which has been listed in blue by the Stockholm City Museum, meaning the building has a particularly high historical and cultural value.

The Filadelfia Church was founded in 1910 as Stockholm's seventh Baptist congregation. From 1911, the congregation was led by pastor Lewi Pethrus. Conflicts within the Baptist Union of Sweden over who could partake of communion resulted in 1913 in the expulsion of the Philadelphia Church by the Stockholm District Association of Baptist Churches (which advocated so-called closed communion).

The congregation's first premises were in a basement at Uppsalagatan (now Gästrikegatan) 11 in Vasastan and held 500 people. In 1911, they rented the Grand National (later Nalen) and the Auditorium. In 1918, premises were purchased at Sveavägen 45 (now the Grand cinema), which were dedicated in September 1921, holding 1,500 people. In 1926, the congregation bought Rörstrand Castle and began reconstruction as well as new construction and in 1931, the Philadelphia Church church on Rörstrandsgatan was dedicated. It was then one of the largest church buildings in the world and the largest meeting place in Stockholm. In 1958, Lewi Pethrus was succeeded by Willis Säwe as pastor. Niklas Piensoho has been the pastor since 2006.

In order to prevent congregations from being expelled, as happened in 1913, the Pentecostal movement has chosen not to join a larger association. Instead, each congregation is completely independent. The Filadelfia Church in Stockholm has been the leading Pentecostal congregation in Sweden in several respects since its foundation. On the initiative of Lewi Pethrus, it was the driving force behind the establishment of the publishing houses Förlaget Filadelfia and Normans Förlag, the journal Evangelii Härold, the record company Hemmets Härold, the purchase of Kaggeholm Castle and the folk high school there, the newspaper Dagen, IBRA Radio, the bank Pingstbanken, and Predikantdagarna—an annual conference for pastors and preachers in the Pentecostal movement. The congregation also did extensive social work through its Räddningsmission ('Rescue Mission), which was responsible for feeding the unemployed and homeless. It also had warming houses and lodging for the homeless. When the Philadelphia congregation bought a lodging ship from Gröna Lund, Arken (the Ark), and offered homeless people overnight accommodation in it, it attracted a lot of attention and authorities intervened to stop the activities. The intervention led to high-profile and large-scale protests that reached all the way up to the government level.

== Pastors ==
- Lewi Pethrus (1911–1958)
- Willis Säwe (1958–1973)
- Karl-Erik Heinerborg (1973–1989)
- Owe Lindeskär (1990–1997)
- Sten-Gunnar Hedin (1997–2006)
- Niklas Piensoho (2006–2025)
- Samuel Jonsson (2025–)
