= Filadelfiakyrkan =

Coordinates: 59.3394°N 18.0344°E

Filadelfia Church
- Filadelfiakyrkan
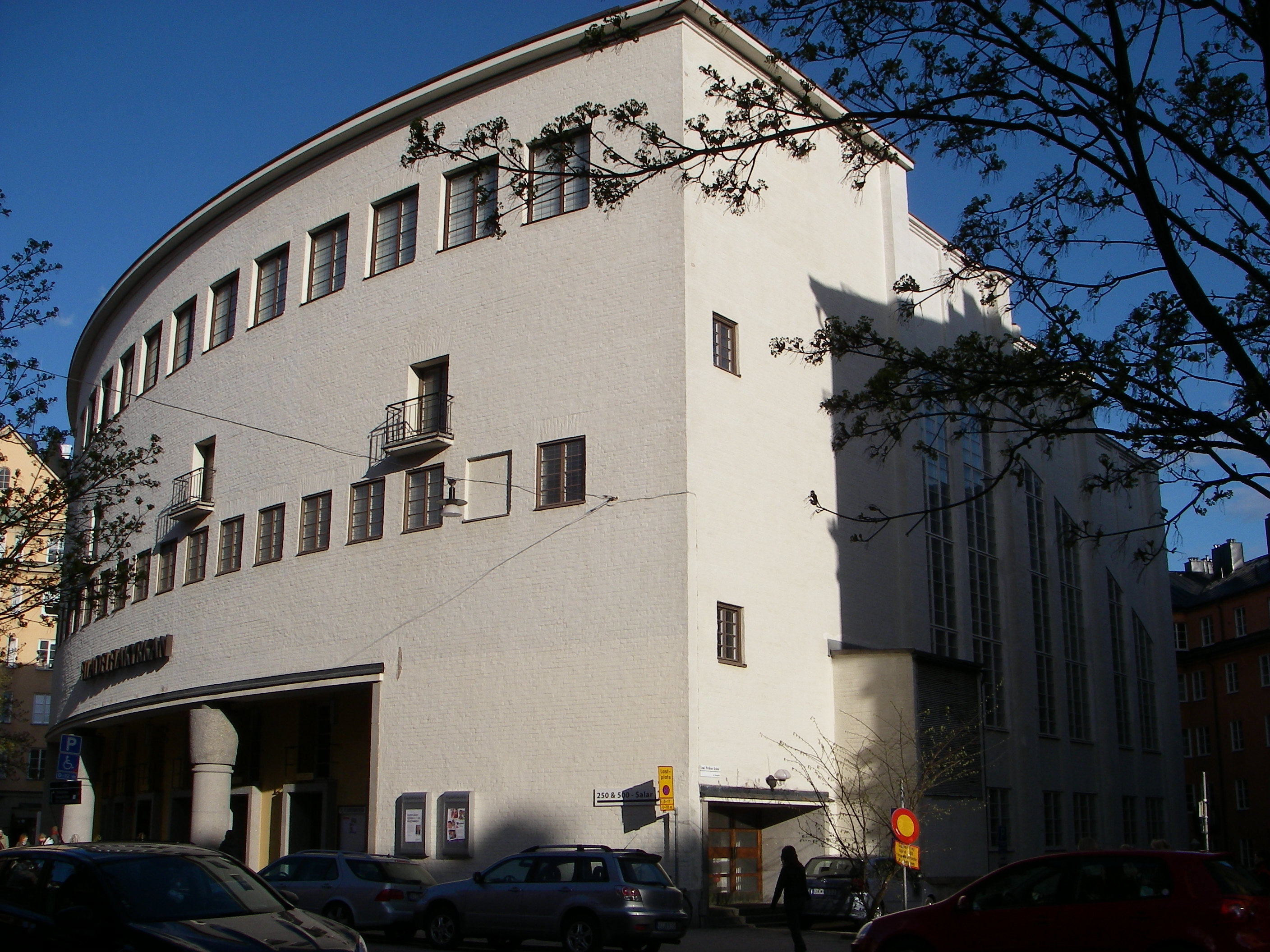
- Filadelfiakyrkan in May 2010
- Filadelfia Church
- Location: Stockholm
- Country: Sweden
- Denomination: Swedish Pentecostal Movement

History
- Consecrated: 2 November 1930

Administration
- Parish: Philadelphia Stockholm

Filadelfiakyrkan ('the Philadelphia Church') is a Pentecostal church building at Rörstrandsgatan 7 in Stockholm, Sweden; it was dedicated on 2 November 1930. The building is owned by the Filadelfia Stockholm congregation, the largest congregation in the Swedish Pentecostal movement with about 5,400 members as of 2015. It is also the largest Pentecostal congregation in Europe.

The Stockholm City Museum has listed the building as having a particularly high historical and cultural value.

The church building is next to Rörstrand Castle, where Kaggeholm Folk High School has been located since 2019. In connection with the COVID-19 pandemic, the church building was completely remodeled for over 100 million SEK.

== Building description ==
The church was built in 1929–1930 according to plans by architect Birger Jonson and was constructed by Karl Ljungberg's construction company and consecrated on 2 November 1930. The church was built on the old factory site of Rörstrand Porcelain, where part of the Rörstrand castle was demolished. The property designation Stengodset 2 ('Stoneware') is a reminder of the former operations. A remnant of the castle can be found next to the eastern façade of the church. Filadelfiakyrkan was designed by Birger Jonsson in a strict functionalist style and is considered one of the breakthroughs of the architectural style in Sweden, with Jonsson as one of its foremost representatives.

Filadelfiakyrkan has a slightly arched grey whitewashed brick façade and a powerfully shaped foyer. The large room is also used for concerts. The sanctuary is shaped like an auditorium with a wide stage and two rows of seating above each other. The room is designed to create good acoustics, which is achieved by a curved ceiling surface and an auditorium that is wider at the back and tapers towards the stage. The exterior reflects the form of the sanctuary in a curved main façade facing Rörstrandsgatan. The wide entrance area with heavy granite columns also announces an assembly hall.

The purchase of Rörstrand Castle and the construction of the Filadelfiakyrkan were initiated by pastor Lewi Pethrus, who was the first leader of the congregation and the undisputed leader of the young Pentecostal movement in Sweden. Filadelfiakyrkan is the second largest free church building in Europe and was for many years the largest gathering place in Stockholm. When it was built, it seated 3,500 people; today it seats 2,200, making it the second-largest free church building in Europe after the Livets Ord building in Uppsala, which seats about 6,200 people.

For the dedication of the church, the congregation's musical director, Karl-Erik Svedlund, wrote a cantata for orchestra, choir and soloists. Einar Ekberg, soloist in the congregation, wrote a setting of the 32nd Psalm for the dedication, which he also performed for the first time at the dedication.

The church space has also been used for concerts. On one occasion, the Nobel Prize was awarded in the church while the Stockholm Concert Hall was being renovated.
