= Bibeltemplet =

Swedish Christian website

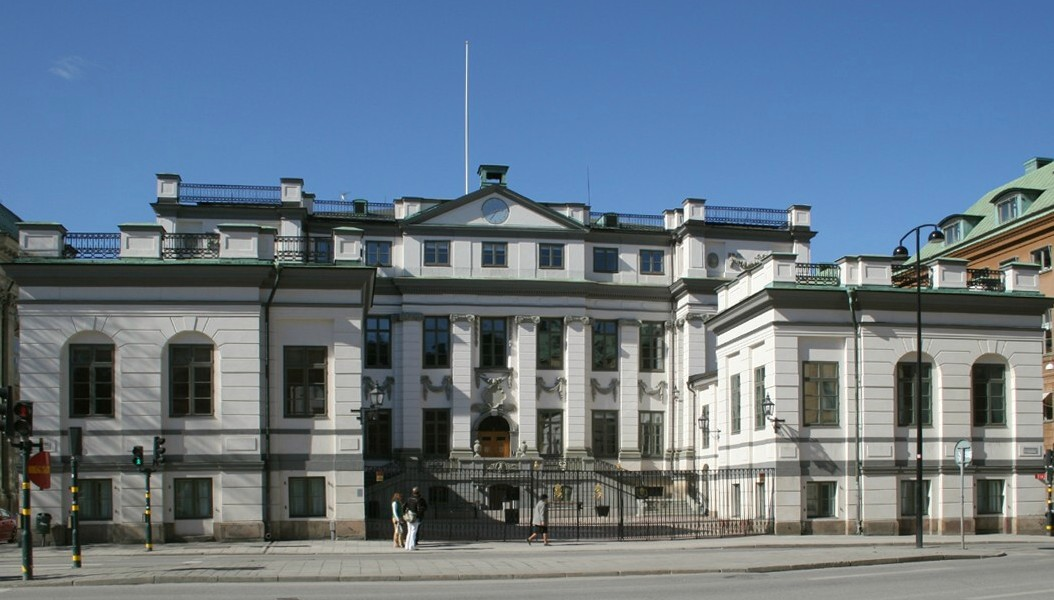
The Supreme Court (Högsta Domstolen) in Stockholm, Sweden, where the case was handled.

Bibeltemplet (the Bible temple) is a Christian website in Sweden, whose administrator Leif Liljeström was sentenced in April 2005 to two months in prison for expressing hateful views on homosexuality. The case was appealed twice, and the Supreme Court of Sweden acquitted Liljeström in November 2007.

== Court of first instance ==
According to the lower court in 2005, the administrator was guilty of "incitement against a group of people" for statements he himself had written, and for crime against "the law on electronic bulletin boards", for guest-messages which he neglected to delete. Liljeström told the court that his purpose is to preach the gospel and win people for Jesus, and that the truth is needed to awake people. Among the statements that led to the verdict were the following: "The modern homophilia is the source and engine behind the AIDS-epidemic", and "AIDS is a punishment from God against sodomy". The view that there should be a "death penalty for homosexual acts" was also uttered on the website by a guest, but that was repudiated by Leif Liljeström directly in the forum. Still, he was convicted to prison also for the guest's statements.

== Appeals Court ==
In April 2006, an appeals court in Gothenburg acquitted Liljestrom of the hate-speech and website content charges, but found him guilty of being an accomplice to hate-speech for allowing third parties to post offensive material on his website. The appeals court sentenced Liljestrom to one month's imprisonment.

== The Supreme Court ==
Liljestrom then filed an appeal to the Gothenburg court decision. The Supreme Court in Stockholm decided to accept the case, and on November 7, 2007, after more than four years of struggle (counting from the day he was reported to the police in October, 2003), he was finally acquitted of all charges.

The case has many similarities with the case of Åke Green, and is expected to be seen as a guideline for coming justice in Sweden.

== See also ==
- Persecution of Christians
- Homosexuality and Christianity
- Special rights
- Hate crime
- Political correctness
- Freedom of religion
- Freedom of speech
