= Bethel Seminary (Stockholm) =

Coordinates: 59.33627721641719°N 17.927959699703244°E

- Betelseminariet
- Stockholm; Sweden

Information
- School type: Seminary
- Denomination: Baptist
- Established: 1866
- Closed: 1994

Bethel Seminary (Swedish: Betelseminariet) was the Baptist Union of Sweden's seminary for training pastors from 1866 to 1994.

== History ==
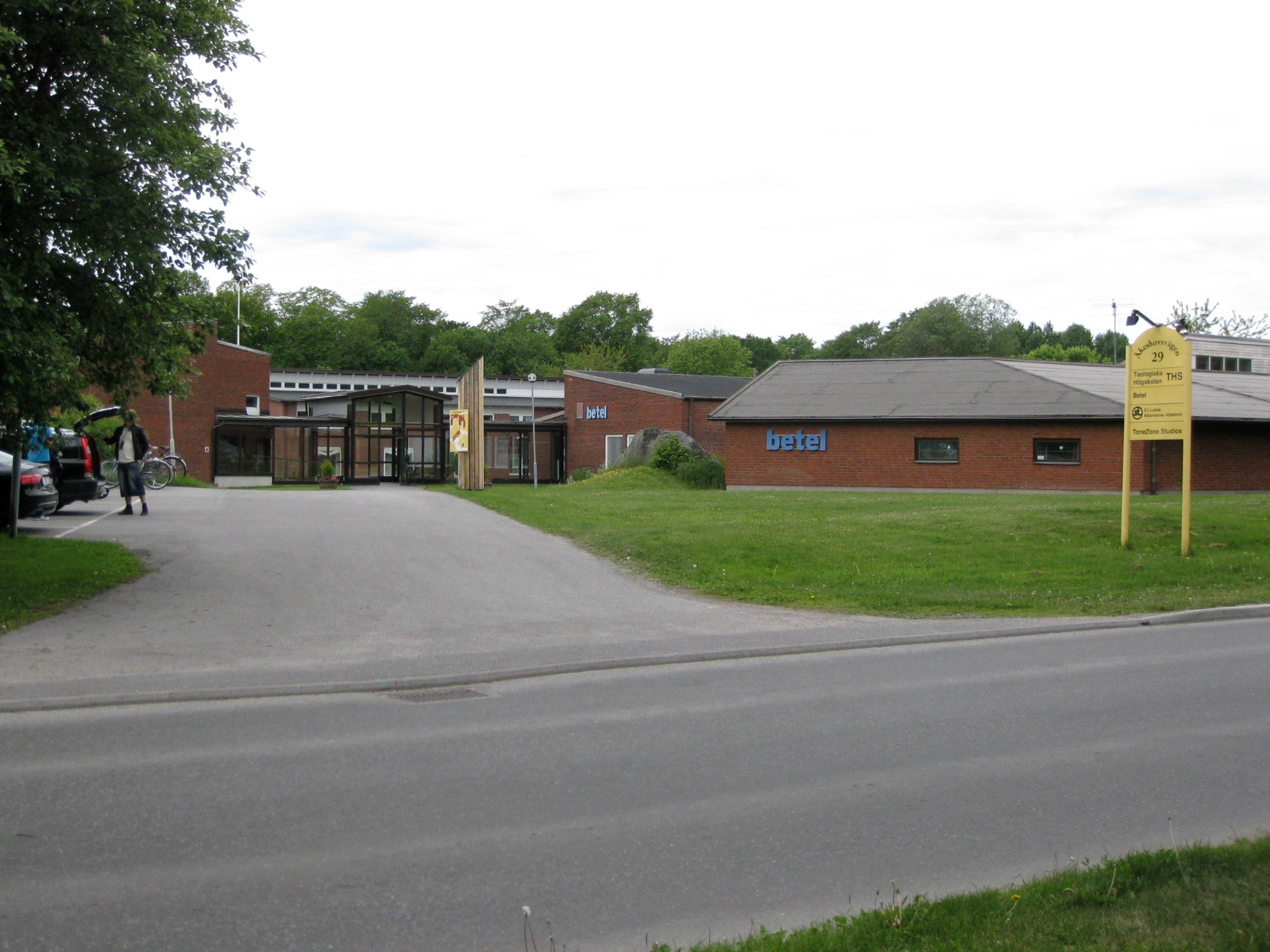
Bethel Seminary buildings in Bromma, built in 1966 according to architect Börje Stigler's plans.

The 1866 conference of the Swedish Baptists, which would eventually lead to the creation of the Baptist Union of Sweden in 1889, decided to found a seminary for the new and growing movement, calling it Bethel Seminary (Betelseminariet). It opened in 1866 and Colonel Oscar Broady of the Union Army was the seminary's first rector. Swedish Baptist pioneer Anders Wiberg helped raise funds through the American Baptist Missionary Union to support the seminary in its early years. In 1905, the seminary had four years with about 40 students each and four regular and two adjunct professors. During the first 40 years, 400 students had attended classes. The seminary had its own library with primarily English theological literature.

In the beginning, Bethel Seminary was located in Bethel Chapel, Stockholm First Baptist Church's chapel, on Malmskillnadsgatan 48 in central Stockholm, but as of 1883 the school's address was Engelbrektsgatan 18 and in 1966 the seminary moved to Bromma. From 1994, Betel folkhögskola (Bethel folk high school) was located in the later premises of Bethel Seminary in Bromma, Stockholm, which became Bromma folkhögskola on 1 February 2014. Enskilda Högskolan Stockholm (University College Stockholm) has been located next to Bethel Seminary's old premises since 2002.

University College Stockholm is a kind of successor to the Bethel Seminary. It was founded in 1993 as a merger of the Bethel Seminary in Bromma and the then-Mission Covenant Church's counterpart Theological Seminary (Teologiska Seminariet) on Lidingö. In the first year the activities were divided between Bromma and Lidingö, after which the entire school was located in Lidingö. After the college outgrew the premises there, new premises were built next to the old Bethel Seminary premises in Bromma, which were inaugurated at the start of the autumn term in 2002. In 2008, the then-Methodist Church Theological Seminary (which until then had been located in Gothenburg) was also added.

== Notable students ==
- 1869–1873 – Jonas Stadling
- 1878–1882 – Jakob Byström
- 1888–1890 – Johan Alfred Rinell
- 1890–1893 – John Wahlborg
- 1904–1906 – Lewi Pethrus
- Unknown years – Ingemar Olsson

== Rectors ==
- 1958–1971 – David Lagergren
