= Johan Alfred Rinell =

Swedish missionary

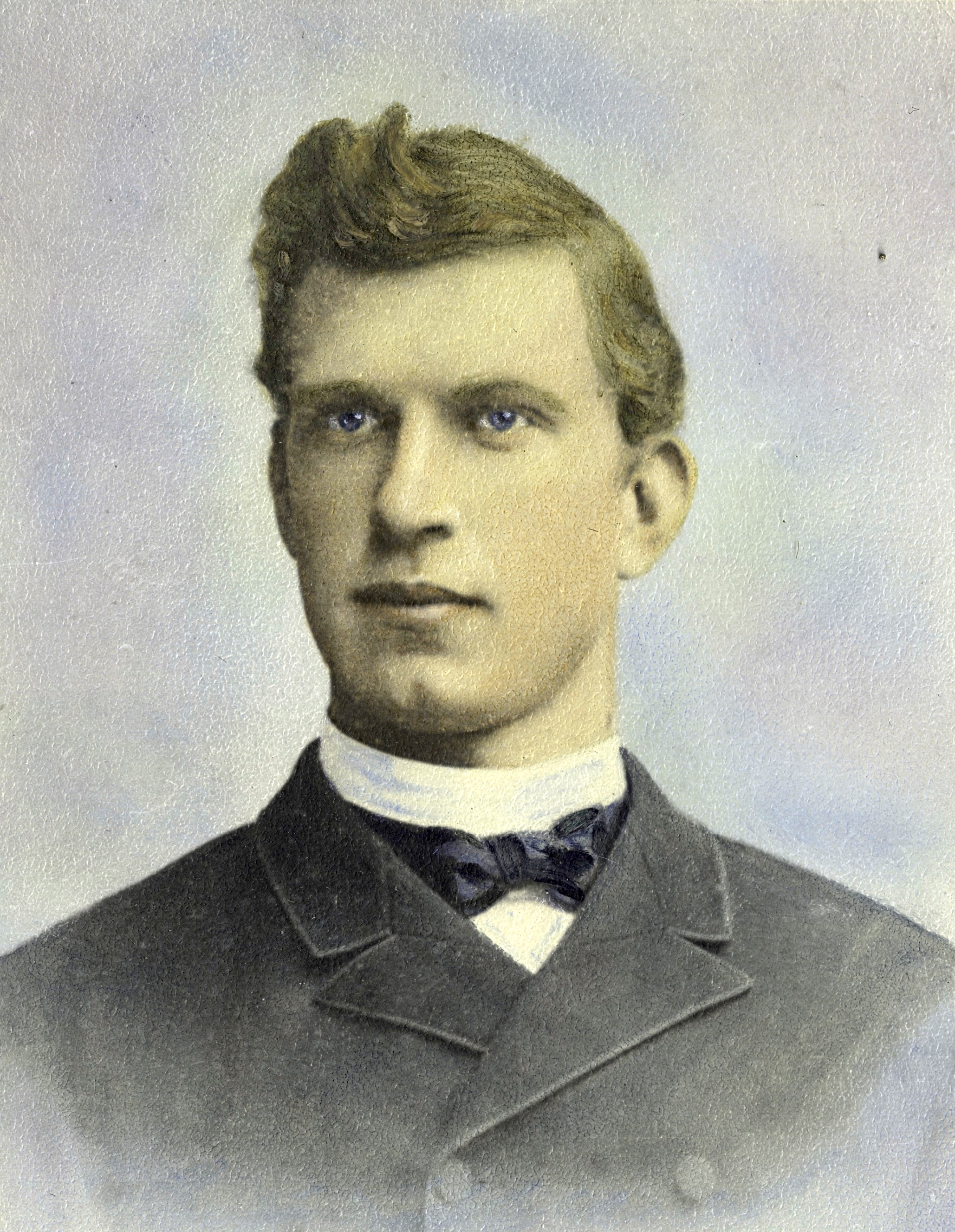
- circa 1893
- Born: November 27, 1866; Östergötland, Sweden
- Died: July 3, 1941 (aged 74); Qingdao (Tsingtao), China
- Resting place: International Cemetery Qingdao (destroyed in 1966 during China's Cultural Revolution)
- Education: Bethel Seminary (Stockholm)(Swedish: Betelseminariet)
- Occupations: Missionary, author, postmaster
- Known for: Philanthropy

Johan Alfred Rinell (originally Johansson) (November 27, 1866 – July 3, 1941) was a Swedish missionary to China sent by the Baptist Union of Sweden (Svenska Baptistsamfundet). In China his mission work included philanthropy, disaster relief, postal work, and education.

== Early days in Sweden and Norway ==
Johan Alfred, as he was known, graduated from Stockholm's Bethel Seminary in 1891. During his time at seminary Rinell was encouraged toward mission work by the British missionary John Hudson Taylor who was lecturing at the seminary. After a short period of time as a pastor in Fredrikshald in Norway, where Rinell married the Swede Hedvig Jansson, the couple sailed for China via England in 1893 and arrived in China in 1894.

== Journey to China ==
On Thursday, November 9, 1893, Johan Alfred and Hedvig set sail on the ship Torsten from Gothenburg, Sweden, bound for London, England. For three and a half months they studied English, which would be more useful than Swedish during their travels and in their future in China.

On Friday, March 2, they made their way to the Port of Tilbury where their ship, the Victoria, was docked.

The ship lifted anchor at 3:30 pm on a beautiful sunny day and sailed toward the Strait of Dover and the English Channel. On board were about 200 people including other missionaries bound for various countries. Among the other missionaries was Anna Holtz who would join Johan Alfred and Hedvig in China.

Over the course of several weeks they sailed by way of Gibraltar, Malta, Brindisi, Egypt, Aden, Columbo, Singapore, Hong Kong, Shanghai and ended their journey on Friday, April 22 at the port town of Chefoo (Yantai). Their ocean travel by sea with a few short stops in between lasted 52 days (one month and 21 days).

Their final destination would be the town of Jiaozhou (simplified Chinese: 胶州; traditional Chinese: 膠州; pinyin: Jiāozhōu) in Shandong province.

== Early days in China ==
From Chefoo the Rinells and Anna together with another Swedish missionary, Johan E. Lindberg, hired donkeys, mules and a driver for the 88 kilometers (55 miles), two day, journey southeast to Jiaozhou (Kiaochow). The women each rode in a luózi 骡子, consisting of a large basket suspended by two poles with a mule in front and one behind. Each of the men rode a baggage-laden mule or walked to give the mules a break.

Johan Alfred and Hedvig had been in China only five months when the First Sino-Japanese War broke out between China and Japan putting them and other internationals in possible danger.

The American consul in Chefoo arranged for the American warship USS Charleston to bring American citizens to Chefoo for their safety. The Swedes were invited to come along. The party left Jiaozhou for Pingdu (平度) on Saturday, February 2, 1895. In Pingdu together with other Swedes, Americans, and now British headed toward San San Saddle (San Shan Saddle) on the northern Shandong coast.

On the way the group, now numbering 14, tried to enter the fishing village of Laizhou (莱州市) on the northern coast. The villagers, alerted that foreigners were approaching, began firing cannon from the hillsides and from boats on the coastline in hope of scaring off these foreigners. They thought they were invading Japanese.

The party retreated and found accommodation “together with barrels, chickens, donkeys, and dirty children” Hedvig wrote, in another village. Some of the villagers even gave up their kangs for their unexpected guests.

After arriving at the coast they boarded the American gunboat USS Charleston which brought them to the port town of Chefoo and safety.

Johan and Hedvig fled Jiaozhou again in 1900 during the Boxer Rebellion. While fleeing the German custom house in Mato in which they were staying was set on fire. No one was hurt during their flight and all made it to Chefoo safely. Though they and their party escaped injury it was not the same for many others.

During the Boxer Rebellion 136 Protestant missionaries including 53 children were killed, 2,000 Chinese Protestants, 47 Catholic priests and nuns, 30,000 Chinese Catholics, and 200 to 400 Russian Orthodox Christians were estimated to have been killed. Of the approximately 230 Westerners killed during the Boxer Rebellion, about 56 were Swedish men, women and children, about a quarter of the Westerners who died.

== Last days ==
Johan Alfred died in Qingdao and was buried in the International Cemetery of that city in 1941. The Chinese Christians of Jiaozhou raised a stone memorial commemorating his work. The International Cemetery was destroyed during the Cultural Revolution.

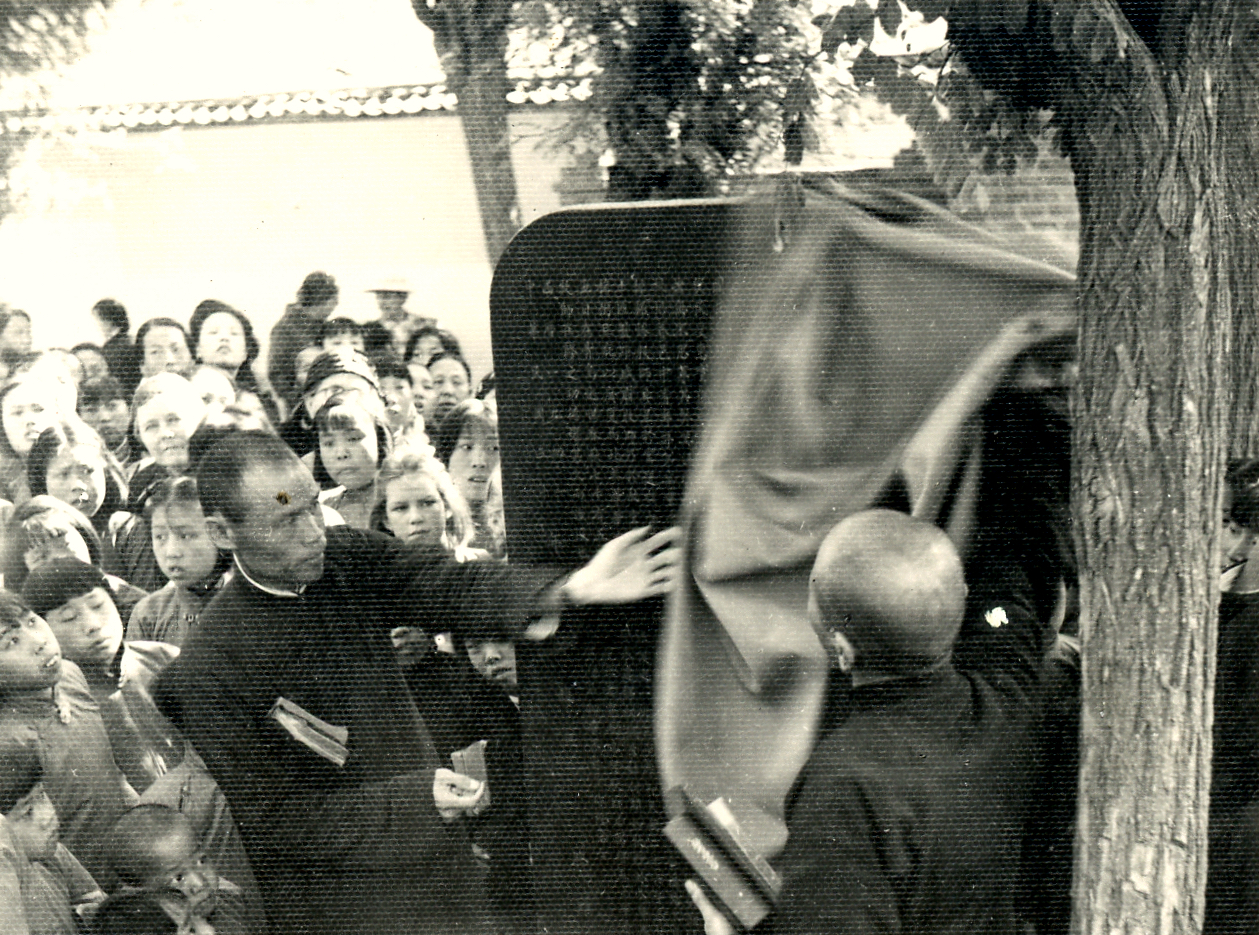
Unveiling of Memorial to Johan Alfred Rinell in Jiaozhou, China, 1941

== Written works ==
Books

- Rinell, Johan Alfred and Johan H. Swordson. Boxare-upproret och förföljelserna mot de kristna i Kina 1900–1901 [Boxer Rebellion and the persecution of Christians in China 1900–1901]. Stockholm, 1902. SELIBR 8235304
- Rinell, Johan Alfred. Missionsproblemet: ett maningsord till det Svenska baptist samfundet [The Missions Problem: a word of advice to the Swedish Baptist community]. Östersund: Missionsbokhandeln, 1910. SELIBR 1616936
- Rinell, Johan Alfred.Missionsuppdraget och vi [The Mission Mandate and Us]. Stockholm: B.-M:s bokförlag, 1932. SELIBR 1366888
- Rinell, Johan Alfred. De svenska baptisternas Kinamission åren 1890–1905 [The Swedish Baptists' China mission 1890–1905]. Stockholm: Westerberg, 1906. SELIBR 1616935
- Rinell, Johan Alfred. Svenska baptistmissionen i Kina – ett 40-årsminne [Swedish baptist mission in China – a 40-year remembrance]. Stockholm B.-M:s Bokförlags A.-B, 1931. SELIBR 8219154

Articles

- Rinell, Johan Alfred and Johan H. Swordson. Missionsbilder Från Kina [Mission pictures from China]. Minneapolis, Minnesota, 1906.
- Rinell, Johan Alfred. T'ai-shan — Kinas heligaste berg [China's most holy mountain]. Betlehem: Kristlic Kalender för 1929, published in 1928, pages 45–49. Stockholm: B.M:s Bokförlags A.-B.
- Rinell Johan Alfred. "Upplevelser och minnen från ett 43-årigt arbete som kinamissionär" [Experiences and memories from a 43-year work as a missionary to China]. Betlehem: Kristlic Kalender för 1929. Stockholm: Ernst Westerbergs Boktryckeri A.-B.
