= Swedish Pentecostal Movement =

Religious group in Sweden

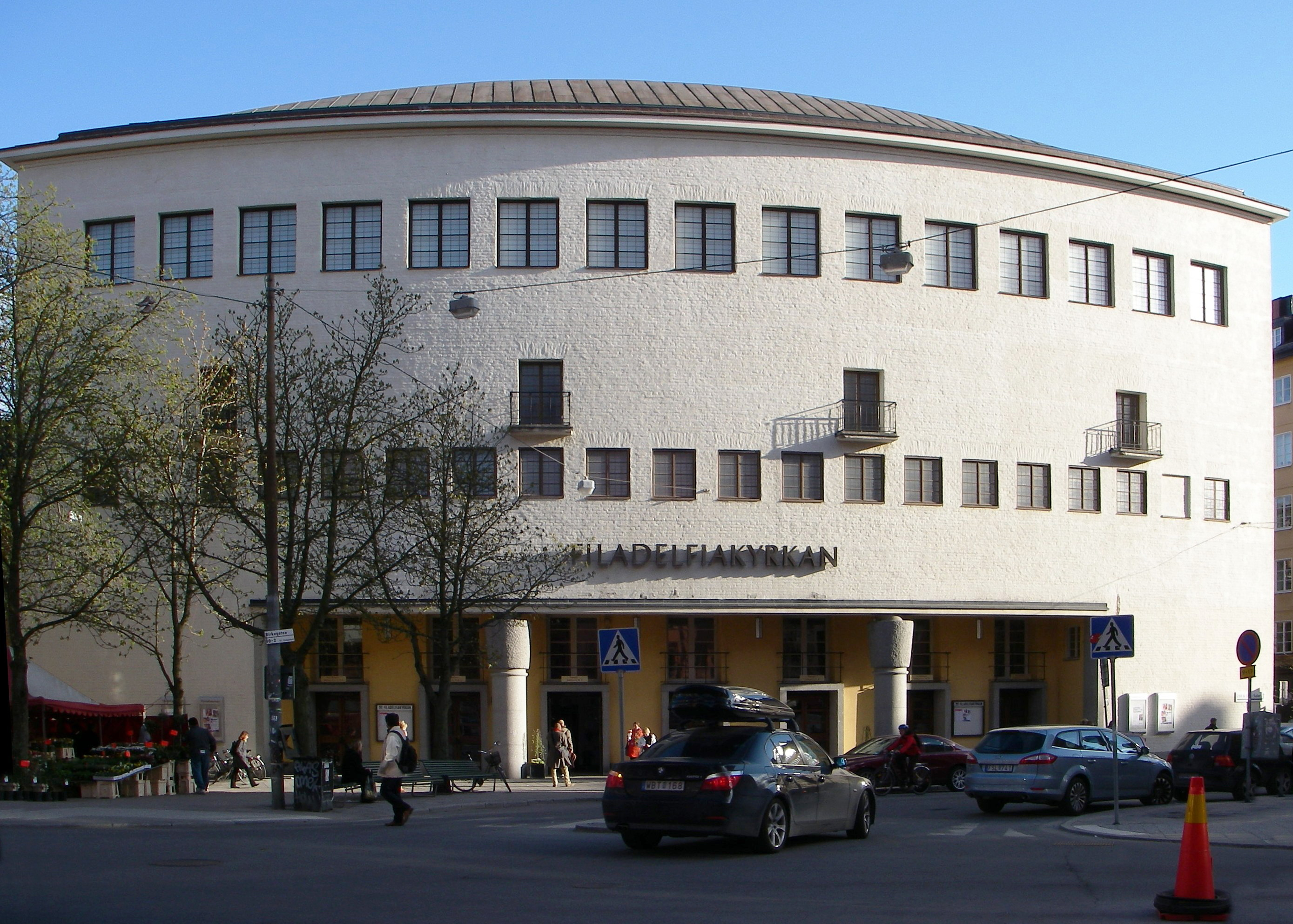
- Filadelfiakyrkan in Stockholm
- Classification: Protestant
- Orientation: Pentecostalism
- Polity: Congregational
- Region: Sweden
- Headquarters: Sweden
- Origin: 1906
- Separated from: Baptist Union of Sweden
- Separations: Maranata Movement (around 1960)

The Swedish Pentecostal Movement (Swedish: Pingströrelsen i Sverige) is a Pentecostal movement in Sweden. Many, but not all, of these, are members of the Pentecostal Alliance of Independent Churches, which was founded in 2001. The Pentecostal movement spread to Sweden by 1907 from the 1904–1905 Welsh Revival and the Azusa Street Revival in Los Angeles in 1906.

The Pentecostal Alliance of Independent Churches is made up of 439 churches and 87,392 members as of December 2017, making it one of Sweden's largest free church organizations. The Pentecostal movement is also part of the broader Charismatic Christianity (which includes both Pentecostals and the non-Pentecostal Charismatic movement).

== Size of the Pentecostal movement ==
In terms of membership, the Pentecostal movement is the second largest free church movement in Sweden after the Uniting Church in Sweden. In 2017 it had 87,392 members in 439 congregations. The movement had its peak in the 1980s, with just over 100,000 members. The Pentecostal Movement has thus had a greater impact on the free church movement in Sweden than in many other countries.

In terms of the number of people served (registered in activities or as members), the Pentecostal movement was the largest free church in 2007–2010; this amounted to 113,527 people in 2010.

The largest Pentecostal congregations in Sweden in 2016 were:

Filadelfia Stockholm, 5,378 members
Smyrna Church in Gothenburg, 3,229 members
Pentecostal Church in Jönköping, 2,465 members
Sion Church in Linköping, 1,522 members
Europaporten in Malmö, 1,315 members

== History ==
The Swedish Pentecostal revival has its origins mainly in the Holiness movement that arose in North America in the 1860s and which reached Sweden in various ways towards the end of the 19th century.

In January 1901, several students at Bethel Bible School in Topeka, Kansas, USA, began speaking in tongues after studying the Bible and spending time in prayer. Agnes Ozman was the first among them to have this experience, but she was soon followed by more students and her teacher Charles Fox Parham.

In 1906, an African-American revival began at 312 Azusa Street in Los Angeles, California and came to Sweden that year through Swedish-American Andrew G. Johnson. He was part of the first group of missionaries sent out from Azusa Street. He first intended to go to Palestine as a missionary, but for various reasons ended up in his hometown of Skövde, where he started work in November 1906. Just over a month later, Norwegian Methodist pastor Thomas Ball Barratt arrived in Kristiania, now Oslo, and started a parallel ministry there. Through heavy media coverage, news of the movement spread quickly in both Norway and Sweden, and many Swedes travelled to Kristiania to experience the much talked-about revival first-hand.

== History in Sweden ==
In 1881, Swedish preacher Fredrik Franson returned from the United States, bringing the seeds of the early Pentecostal movement and engaging in preaching to large groups. He returned in 1907 to again preach.

The Pentecostal revival in Sweden was spread partly through the travels of Andrew G. Johnson, and partly through a large number of evangelists, mainly women, from the Örebro Mission. The leader of this mission was John Ongman, and the women thus came to be called Ongmansystrar ('Ongman sisters'). Through Ongman's support of the revival that came with Johnson, Örebro became an early Pentecostal center in Sweden, along with the aforementioned Skövde. Through the Örebro Missionary Society, which Ongman founded in 1908, his followers began to run their own evangelistic and missionary activities. Ongman's group welcomed the new movement, and after a schism with the Baptist Church in 1938 became a separate denomination, the Örebro Mission.

The next strongest center of activity was Gothenburg, with ecumenical activities held in Torghallen on Kungstorget. The first Pentecostal magazine in Sweden, Glöd från altaret (Glow from the Altar), was also published in Gothenburg.

From 1911, a strong leader in Stockholm became increasingly prominent, young Baptist pastor Lewi Pethrus. From his Kölingared Declaration of 1919 onwards, the Filadelfia Church in Stockholm increasingly became the movement's center and Pethrus its unofficial leader.

The Pentecostal movement in Sweden was initially interdenominational (ecumenical). In some places, such as Gothenburg, the movement remained interdenominational for quite some time; no Pentecostal congregations were formed until the 1920s. As early as 1907, however, a non-denominational congregation joined, the Betania Church in Adelöv, which had been started in 1901, and the following year Pentecostal congregations were formed in places such as Skärhamn and Luleå. Relations with the local Baptist congregations were good, however, and many of them were still referred to as Baptist congregations. Mostly, however, they were independent prayer groups. The original town of Skövde, for example, did not have its own Pentecostal church until 1912.

The Filadelfia Church in Stockholm was led from 1911 to 1958 by Pethrus. In 1913, it was expelled from the Baptist Union of Sweden because of disagreements over the Lord's Supper. The real reason for excluding the Filadelfia Church, according to some, was to get rid of the energetic leader Pethrus in order to avoid division within the community. However, the Filadelfia Church was not the first congregation to be expelled from the Baptist Union for reasons similar to these. Such expulsions had been going on since 1907 and the arrival of the Pentecostal revival in Sweden. John Wahlborg describes the expulsion as embarrassing and sad in his book I Mästarens ärenden. 35 år som svensk baptistpredikant. However, the expulsion led to the growth of the Pentecostal movement, and it was the Swedish Baptist Church that lost the most members. For a whole year, however, Pethrus was aware that the Filadelfia Church was under threat of expulsion from the Baptist Union if their communion practices did not change. Subsequently, a number of attempts were made to reunite the two. One example of this is in 1919 when the Baptist communion practice changed and moved closer to Pethrus's understanding of the Eucharist. These attempts at reconciliation were hampered by Pethrus developing the view that church membership is unbiblical. When Pethrus developed this view is disputed; however, there is much evidence to suggest that this occurred after his expulsion from the community. For example, Pethrus urged the delegates before the Stockholm district meeting of the Baptist Union in April 1913 not to move for the expulsion of the Filadelfia Church. Another inflaming factor was the development of a strong polemic between Pethrus and the free church communities in Sweden at the time. Pethrus attacked the Baptist Union, and the idea of Christian denominations in general, in a number of magazine articles, drawing strong criticism from founder of the Örebro Mission School John Ongman (who perhaps worked hardest for reconciliation between Pethrus and the Baptist Union), the leadership of the Baptist Union and the leadership of the Missionary Society.

After his breakthrough in 1911, Lewi Pethrus was the informal leader of the Swedish Pentecostal movement until his death in 1974. Sven Lidman is also considered to have been of great importance for the movement's development in Sweden until the break between Pethrus and Lidman in 1948. After Pethrus' death, the Filadelfia Church held an important position as the gathering for the national pastors' conference.

In 2001, the Pentecostal Alliance of Independent Churches, Pingst Fria Församlingar i Samverkan, (Pingst FFS), was founded. It has appointed a superintendent for the affiliated congregations. The first superintendent was Sten-Gunnar Hedin. Pelle Hörnmark took over as leader for second time in 2024, having previously led the movement from 2008-2016.

== Teachings ==
As the Pentecostal movement consists of independent congregations, there are no uniformly adopted creeds or doctrines. However, a homogeneity in doctrinal issues has emerged over the history of the movement.

Like most other Christian denominations (but unlike the non-Trinitarian oneness Pentecostal movement), Swedish Pentecostal congregations endorse the content of creeds such as the Apostles' and Nicene Creeds. However, these are not regularly read as part of worship or teaching.

=== Relationship to other Christian movements ===
The Pentecostal movement considers itself one of the Christian churches in Sweden and is a member of the Christian Council of Sweden and thus the World Council of Churches. The Pentecostal movement has previously been skeptical towards ecumenism, particularly at a high organizational level, but has gradually become more open to it. Today it cooperates ecumenically in many contexts.

The Pentecostal movement is doctrinally close to most Swedish free churches, revivalist movements and low churches, in particular the charismatic movement, Baptist churches and evangelicalism, as well as the Word of Faith movement. The differences that exist today concern expression, forms of activity and ideals of piety to a much greater extent than theological doctrinal differences.

It is not uncommon for Pentecostals to be members of the Church of Sweden and involved in church politics. Since the Pentecostal movement came into being long after the Conventicle Act, there is not as strong a tradition of demarcation from the Church of Sweden as in older free churches. Some interaction with the Catholic Church has occurred in recent times, for example in connection with the Jesus Manifesto and retreats.

=== Faith in God as the Creator ===
The belief in God as the creator of heaven and earth has been self-evident in the Pentecostal movement. The emphasis in teaching has been on holiness and the love of God. God is absolutely separated from evil and is entirely pure. God's love for the world is demonstrated by his sending his son Jesus Christ into the world. The Pentecostal movement has also placed a strong emphasis on prayer, praise and worship. Man's highest purpose is to live for the glory of God. The Swedish Pentecostal movement professes the Trinity: the classical Christian belief in God as Father, Son and Spirit, although this is not the case in all Pentecostal churches worldwide.

=== Man as the image of God and fallen sinner ===
As a branch off the Baptist church, Pentecostalism does not believe in the doctrine of original sin, in the sense that every child is born in a state of sin and guilt. Instead, the movement teaches that every person is born pure and sinless. Children belong to the kingdom of heaven, as Jesus said. (Matthew 19:14) Man has an innate damaged nature, a "sin sickness", an inability to always and in all situations choose what is right, as a legacy of Adam's fall. As man grows older and becomes aware of his environment, God's law and his conscience, he will sooner or later deliberately violate God's will by his actions. Only this deliberate and conscious personal act is considered sin; this is called active sin as opposed to original sin.

In the Swedish Pentecostal movement, sickness and death are seen only as a consequence of the fall of man, whereas in the American Word of Faith movement, among others, sickness is seen as a consequence of the individual's sin.

=== The person and atoning work of Jesus ===
The Pentecostal movement has always had a clear focus on Jesus and his power. It sees Jesus as the Son of God, the Messiah and God according to trinitarian doctrine. It also sees him as the only way to God and believes that his coming was already foretold in the Old Testament.

Pentecostalism preaches an objective doctrine of atonement in which Christ died on the cross to bear the punishment for man's sin and wickedness. It believes that through his death salvation is made possible for all believers in Christ.

=== Man's need for conversion ===
Every human being who has reached a conscious age has sinned and lost the glory of God. They have failed to live fully in accordance with God's will, violating their conscience and what is written in the Bible. Sin destroys fellowship with God. But by turning to Jesus, a person can receive forgiveness for his or her sin and be saved, that is, a Christian. As a Christian revival movement, Pentecostalism has emphasized the idea that salvation occurs in the context of repentance or being born again at a specific point in time from a previous life of sin, despite the fact that many members were in fact raised in the movement and have never abandoned the faith, and many lack a distinct salvation experience or have a very early salvation experience. Salvation and grace are thus not given once and for all by Christ, as in the Lutheran faith (predestination). Grace is not entirely unconditional, but requires the cooperation of man in the form of an active choice (synergism).

The movement tends to emphasize that the converted person is forgiven and freed from sin in God's eyes (justification) once and for all in the process of conversion, rather than focusing on the evil of human nature. Confessing sin daily or as part of the worship service is emphasized less often in Pentecostalism than in traditional Lutheran Christianity.

=== Baptism ===
Pentecostal churches practice believer's baptism, a consciously chosen baptism based on the person's own conversion to Jesus Christ, becoming a Christian, and being baptized in water by immersion. Baptism also makes a person a member of a local Pentecostal church. In practice, members' children are often baptized between the ages of eight and twelve in the Swedish Pentecostal movement, unlike in Eastern Europe where baptism is delayed until adulthood. Many adults are also baptized in Pentecostal churches who have come to faith in Jesus Christ.

Pentecostal churches do not usually accept members who have not undergone believer's baptism. However, this practice is under discussion. A believer who is converted but not yet baptized, or was baptized as an infant, is now considered by the movement to be a Christian and saved.

In the Pentecostal movement, baptism is seen as an act of confession that confirms one's salvation. Pastor Harald Gustafsson, who led the Smyrna Church in Gothenburg between 1945 and 1967, wrote about baptism as an act of confession and also likens baptism to a marriage ceremony where one is dedicated to Christ.

A person who has undergone believer's baptism and then lost and regained faith is not re-baptized, but is welcomed as a member anyway.

=== Holiness ===
The movement further emphasizes that a person who not only repents and receives forgiveness, but also surrenders his or her life completely into God's hands, is helped by the Holy Spirit to think and act in accordance with God's will (sanctification). The doctrine of sanctification is a legacy of John Wesley, the founder of Methodism, but the Pentecostal movement does not believe that complete sanctification or Christian perfection is possible in this life—terms coined by Wesley—but that sanctification is an ongoing process. However, the phrase "deliverance from the power of sin" is common in Pentecostalism. Some preachers argue that although all Christians are tempted and make mistakes at times, sanctification makes it not normal for a born-again Christian to commit sin on a regular and planned basis.

=== The Holy Spirit and baptism in the Spirit ===
The most characteristically Pentecostal belief is that of baptism in the Holy Spirit—the belief that the Holy Spirit can fill a Christian with supernatural power and abilities. In Pentecostal theology, baptism in the Holy Spirit is seen as a special experience in addition to salvation and baptism. Baptism in the Holy Spirit used to be considered within Pentecostalism to be always manifested by speaking in tongues. It is seen in Pentecostalism as a separate event, distinct from salvation and baptism in the name of Jesus, when the believer receives the gift of the Holy Spirit instead. In Pentecostalism, all Christians are considered to have the gift of the Spirit, but not all are baptized in the Spirit.

Based on Romans 12 and 1 Corinthians 12, it speaks of a number of spiritual gifts which a Christian can have. The most emphasized have been:

- Speaking in tongues—supernatural language, sometimes as a prayer language between a person and God and sometimes as a message that can be understood by others.
- Healing—the supernatural ability to cure diseases.
- Prophecy—revelations about things humans cannot know (the future, hidden problems, etc.)

Baptism in the Spirit can occur before or after water baptism. The Holy Spirit can also give the fruits of the Spirit, but these are usually considered to be given to all Christians, not just those baptized in the Spirit.

=== Independent congregations ===
Since its inception, the Swedish Pentecostal movement has maintained that there is a New Testament principle that the local congregation should not be subordinate to a national denomination. It should be the local congregation that appoints its own pastors and leaders and decides its own operations and doctrine. This position was perceived by parts of the movement as being challenged when a cooperative organization was formed, hence the name of the denomination, the Pentecostal Alliance of Independent Churches.

=== Leadership ===
Pentecostal congregations are led by lay people. These lay leaders are often referred to as elders or congregational leaders. However, most Pentecostal churches also have an employed pastor and church administrator, who is usually recruited from outside the local church. These are subordinate to the congregational meeting, where every member has the right to vote, which is the highest decision-making body of a traditional Pentecostal congregation. Some members of the congregational board are also elders. In some congregations, only male elders are allowed. Recently, many congregations have begun to separate the role of the chairman of the board from that of the church administrator.

=== View of the Bible ===
The Pentecostal movement's view of the Bible can be characterized as traditionally biblical. It sees the Bible as the Word of God and the only valid source of Christian faith. It thus rejects the biblical criticism and religious pluralism of liberal theology. The literal interpretation of the Bible combined with the ideal of the nuclear family leads to conservative values that sometimes conflict with society's humanist ethics, for example in the view on homosexual couples, and in the past also the view on abortion. However, after the trials caused by Åke Green's critical statements regarding homosexuality, the tone on the issue has changed in most congregations' preaching and leading Pentecostal pastors have distanced themselves from Green's way of expression.

The early Pentecostal movement in the United States was a movement that crossed traditional church boundaries. At the same time, it received criticism early on from conservative evangelical groups that emerged at the same time, who argued that Pentecostalism was "a socially subversive anti-dogmatic form of Christianity". Over time, however, the sharp divisions between the groups in the United States diminished, and after World War II the former boundaries blurred. Today, critics of Pentecostalism often refer to the movement as fundamentalist (in the modern sense of the word) in debate, but the movement's representatives tend to consider themselves to be Bible-believing.

Despite the literalist view of the Bible, there are some parts of the New Testament's teachings that are interpreted within the Swedish Pentecostal movement today in the historical context in which they were written, such as views on women's hairstyles, head coverings and roles in the church, and the view of eating blood food. In some countries the Pentecostal movement is still more literal in these areas.

== Eschatology ==
The Pentecostal movement, especially in the past, has stressed that we are living in the end times and that Jesus is coming soon. Sometimes a desire is expressed to hasten Jesus' return and the events that will precede it according to biblical prophecy. This is used as an argument for missionary work and sometimes for Christian Zionism. The emphasis on Jesus' return has also led to theories about signs that we are currently in the end times, and that world developments are portrayed as negative. On occasion, attempts have been made to estimate the timing of Jesus' return. The Pentecostal movement has distanced itself from exaggerations that would lead to a withdrawal from society, but defends the notion of having as much influence as possible before Jesus returns.

== Worship ==
Worship services in Pentecostal congregations are characterized by a rich musical aspect. The most widely used songbook is the movement's own Segertoner, used mainly for songs sung in unison. Simpler forms of worship songs are also common.

In the past, several large choirs and string ensembles were common in most congregations. Today these have been replaced by smaller groups of singers and musicians, including worship teams.

The form of worship is free and usually follows a simple order of worship, with much opportunity for variation. A service leader serves as the "director" during the service. Preachers and service leaders do not function as an intermediate between God and the congregation in the way a Catholic or High Church Lutheran priest does. However, the Priestly Blessing has become common in recent times at the conclusion of the service, but is seen as a prayer of blessing rather than the pastor conveying a blessing.

Space is given for the individual to participate spontaneously through prayer, prophecy, singing or speech (testifying). However, the use of that space was more common in the past. During congregational prayer, several people often pray at the same time, sometimes loudly but usually in a whisper, or speak softly in tongues while one person leads in prayer aloud. Silence and space for contemplation are rare in worship services, except during introspection just before the celebration of communion. The view of communion is that it is symbolic and the movement thus does not believe in the real presence, i.e. that Christ is present in communion through the transformation of the bread and wine into the body and blood of Christ. The Swedish Pentecostal movement thus adopts the Reformed doctrine in contrast to the Lutheran, Catholic and Orthodox doctrines with regard to communion. Non-alcoholic wine is used in the celebration of communion, out of consideration for people with alcohol problems.

The sermon may last half an hour or longer and is centered on the Bible or faith in everyday life. The preacher usually speaks in an engaging and compelling way. Responses such as shouts, sighs or applause may occur.

At the end of the service there is often an opportunity for intercessory prayer.

== Missions ==
The Swedish Pentecostal Movement is one of the world's largest missionizing free church movements in per capita terms. The Swedish Pentecostal movement has about 600 missionaries in 50 countries.

The movement's greatest success has been in Brazil, where two Swedish Pentecostal missionaries, Daniel Berg and Gunnar Vingren, traveled in 1910 and laid the foundations for what is now the world's largest national Pentecostal movement, the General Convention of the Assemblies of God in Brazil.

The missionary work has clearly combined preaching of the gospel with care for the poor and marginalised. Churches, schools and hospitals have been built. In recent decades, Pingstmissionens Utvecklingssamarbete (the Pentecostal Mission's Development Cooperation Organization, or PMU) has cooperated extensively with the Swedish International Development Cooperation Agency.

The Free Pentecostal Fellowship in Kenya (FPFK) owes its origins in part to Swedish Reverend Gustav Struble and his wife Maria Struble. Today, the FPFK has over 170,000 members across 500 churches.

In 1969 the FPFK began publishing a magazine called Habari Maalum. Publication of the magazine ceased in Kenya during the late 1980s but continued circulating in neighboring Tanzania.

Today the Pentecostal movement is active in mission work in all parts of the world. Tanzania has been a major recipient for many years.

== Education ==
There are no formal education requirements to become a pastor in the Pentecostal movement. Pentecostal pastors often have less training than pastors in older denominations; the education received is incompatible with the education of most other free churches.

The Pentecostal movement runs five folk high schools and a theological seminary. In addition, a number of churches run Bible schools, courses in biblical studies ranging from a few weeks to two years.

- Kaggeholm Folk High School
- June Folk High School
- Mariannelund Folk High School
- Umeå Folk High School
- Vinga Folk High School
- Academy for Leadership and Theology

== Organisations ==
The Pentecostal churches collectively run a variety of organizations. As these became more dispersed work began in the 1990s to bring them together under a single organization. In 2002 the national association the Pentecostal Alliance of Independent Churches was founded with this aim. 251 of the movement's congregations are members of the organization.

Together, the Pentecostal congregations also own and operate, among other things:

The Swedish Pentecostal Mission—joint missionary body

The LP Program—addiction treatment on a Christian basis

TV Inter—television production company

IBRA—media production company

Pingst Förvaltning AB—group that owns, among other things, 25% of the newspaper Dagen

== The Pentecostal movement in media and literature ==
The Pentecostal movement has recently received attention in the media, for example in connection with the following events:

- Lewis Resa ('Lewi's Journey', Per Olov Enquist's 2001 novel about Lewi Pethrus)
- "The Jesus Manifesto" (debate article and book by Pentecostal leader Sten-Gunnar Hedin and Catholic cardinal Anders Arborelius in 2003)
- Åke Green (pastor who was convicted of incitement to hatred in 2004 but later acquitted)
- Filadelfia Church in Knutby (local congregation that left the Pentecostal movement after accusations of being a cult in 2004)
- The bankruptcy and dissolution of Stockholm Karisma Center in 2005

== Debates within the movement ==
=== Organization ===
In 1916, the preachers of the Pentecostal movement formulated a strong rejection of the denominational system, mainly aimed at the Baptist Union of Sweden. They argued that a church should not be subordinated to a higher body.

In order not to encroach on the freedom of the individual congregations, the movement chose different forms of cooperation, sometimes foundations, sometimes joint-stock companies, sometimes non-profit organizations, whatever suited the situation best. During the 1990s, a feeling spread that these organizations had become too spread out and were in need of coordination. This then came into conflict with the view that the movement should not have an overarching body.

Opponents perceived the efforts as an attempt to control and direct the congregations. Additionally, they argued that a large overarching organization only spent money that would be better used for ministry.

Proponents, on the other hand, argued that the organization was merely a continuation of the path already chosen by choosing to cooperate in a variety of organizations. They also argued that money would be saved through gains in efficiency.

During this process, the law regarding religious communities was changed when the Church of Sweden was separated from the state. This made it possible for religious communities to register and collect church fees through taxes.

The discussion resulted in the formation of the national association the Pentecostal Alliance of Independent Churches and the registered faith community Faith Community—The Pentecostal Alliance of Independent Churches.

=== Baptism ===
In the Swedish Pentecostal movement, only one form of baptism is practiced and recognized: believer's baptism by immersion. This has traditionally also been the basis for membership in Swedish Pentecostal congregations. However, some congregations which have recently merged with congregations belonging to other denominations, have begun to allow Christians who have not been baptized by believer's baptism to become members by confession.
