= Focus (encyclopedia) =

Swedish five-volumed encyclopedia

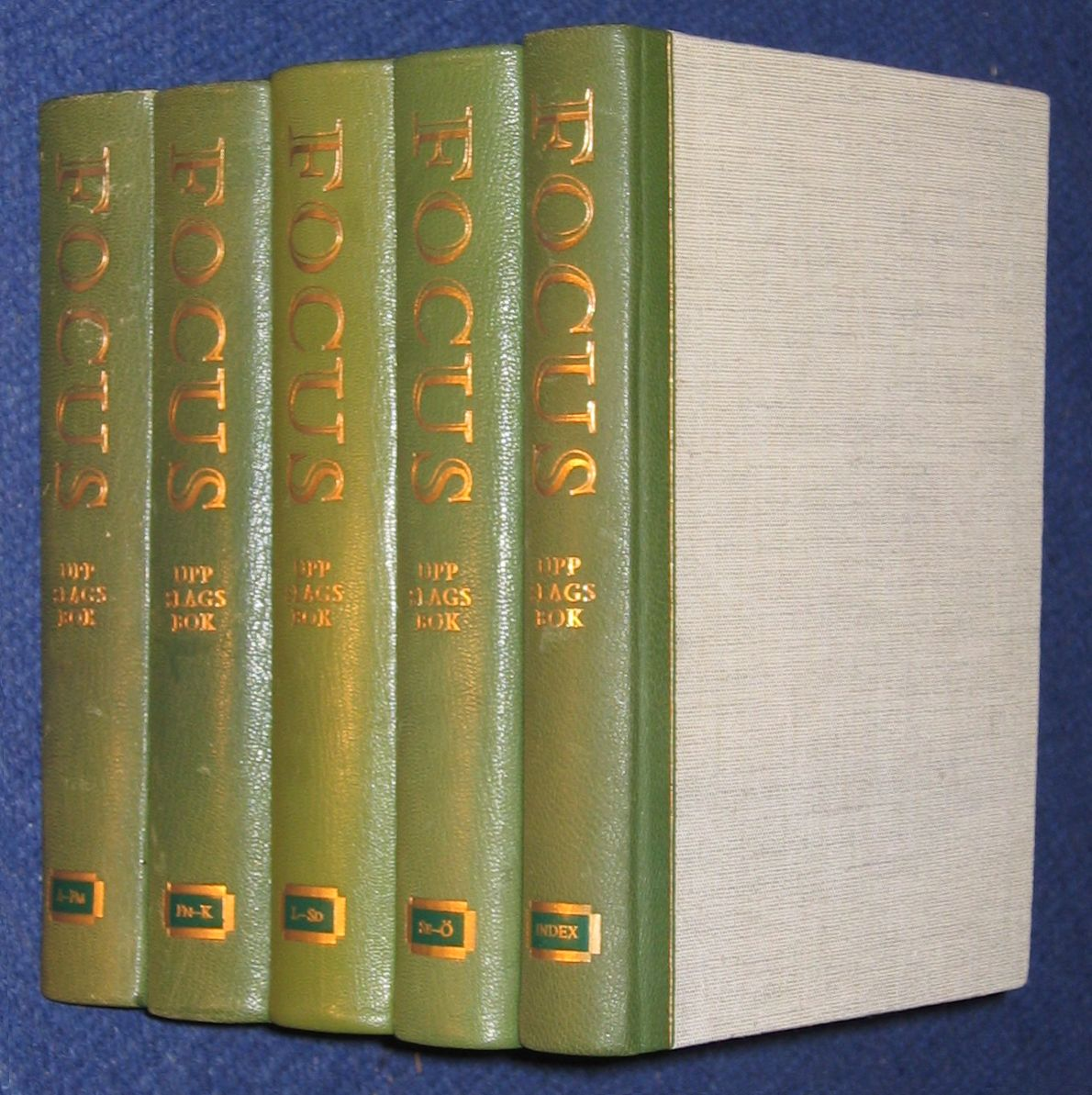
Covers

Focus is an encyclopedia first published in Swedish in five volumes 1958–1960, later extended with additional volumes, republished in several editions, and translated to Danish, Norwegian, French, Portuguese, and Spanish. Based on inspiration from the richly illustrated 1947 edition of the American World Book Encyclopedia, the plan for Focus as conceived by Sven Lidman (born 1921) was based on two principles:

1. a set of highly instructional and internationally reusable illustrations should be produced first, to which text could be written later in various languages, and
2. the basic encyclopedia should be compact (only 3 or 4 volumes) to which specialized add-on volumes from a series (Sports in Focus, This year in Focus, etc.) could be combined ("Kombinationslexikon statt Konversationslexikon"), making it easier to cover different market segments.

Sven Lidman left his previous employer in 1955 and took this new idea to the Swedish publishing house Almqvist & Wiksell, but only after also getting a letter of intent from German publisher Bertelsmann was he able to get his employer started. Being the first richly illustrated encyclopedia in Sweden (and several other countries), the sales were a given success. The idea of only reusing the illustrations failed, as most contracting publishers chose to translate most of the text as well. A fifth volume containing an index, thesaurus and cross-reference was added to the basic encyclopedia, not least because this increased the total "number of entries" from 40,000 (in the main volumes) to 100,000 (in the index), one of the strongest sales arguments for encyclopedias.

Sven Lidman left A&W in 1963 to continue his work in Swedish lexicography elsewhere. His autobiography Uppslagsboken och jag was published in 1987.
