= International Blue Cross =

Voluntary association

- Abbreviation: IBC
- Founded: 1886 (Blue Cross movement founded in 1877)
- Type: International non-governmental organization
- Registration no.: Registered in the Commercial Register of the Canton of Bern
- Headquarters: Lindenrain 5a, 3012 Bern, Switzerland
- Website: https://internationalbluecross.org
- Formerly called: International Federation of the Blue Cross (until 2016)

Logo International Blue Cross

International Blue Cross (IBC) is an international, Christian value-based and politically independent non-governmental organization headquartered in Bern, Switzerland. It is the international umbrella organization of national Blue Cross organizations working in the fields of alcohol and other drug-related harm, addiction prevention, treatment, aftercare, advocacy and development cooperation.

The Blue Cross movement originated in Switzerland in 1877, while the international umbrella organization was founded in 1886. According to IBC's Strategy 2021-2028, it has member organizations in Africa, Asia, Europe and Latin America ( 37 member organizations in 2026).

IBC has held special consultative status with the United Nations Economic and Social Council (ECOSOC) since 2016.

== History ==
The origins of the Blue Cross movement and thus of the international umbrella organization IBC go back to the 19th century. Alcohol problems were widespread in the society of that time. This prompted the Swiss pastor Louis-Lucien Rochat to get involved for those affected. Together with his colleagues, he tried to alleviate the suffering of alcohol-dependent people. His commitment led to the official founding of the Blue Cross on 21 September 1877 in Geneva.

Soon, the Blue Cross movement spread beyond the Swiss borders. This created the need to unite the individual groups under one international umbrella organization. That’s why the “Comité International” was founded in La Chaux-de-Fonds (Switzerland) in 1886 – and thus the International Blue Cross was born. Soon the movement not only crossed national borders but also spread beyond Europe: in 1906 the first non-European Blue Cross organization was founded in Africa, Ghana. Today, nearly 40 national organizations from Europe, Africa, Asia, and South America are part of the International Blue Cross.

International Blue Cross was previously known as the International Federation of the Blue Cross.

== Organization ==
International Blue Cross serves as the umbrella organization for national Blue Cross organizations. Its secretariat is based at Lindenrain 5a, 3012 Bern, Switzerland.

IBC is registered as a Swiss association (Verein) in the Commercial Register of the Canton of Bern under commercial register number CH-036.6.077.065-5 and UID CHE-427.916.945. The register entry dates from 15 March 2019. This commercial-register date is a legal registration date and should not be confused with the organization’s 1886 founding date.

IBC describes itself as a Christian value-based and politically independent non-governmental organization. Its member organizations operate in their respective national contexts while participating in the international Blue Cross network.

== Activities ==
IBC works to prevent and reduce the use, abuse and dependency of alcohol and other drugs and their related harms, with particular emphasis on vulnerable populations. The IBC network works in areas including advocacy, prevention, treatment and aftercare. IBC also enables exchange and learning between Blue Cross organizations and represents the network through a joint global voice.

=== Prevention and support ===
IBC's Strategy 2021-2028 identifies evidence-based prevention and intervention as a central area of work. Approaches identified in the strategy include life-skills-based prevention, mutual and self-help activities, community action and brief interventions.

National Blue Cross organizations provide different combinations of prevention, counselling, treatment, rehabilitation and aftercare according to their national contexts and organizational structures. You can find out more about their work via each country’s contact: https://internationalbluecross.org/about/national-organisations/

=== Advocacy and development cooperation ===
IBC engages in advocacy concerning alcohol and other drug-related health and social issues and participates in international networks concerned with these subjects.

The organization also implements international development and cooperation programmes with local partners. Its strategy links this work to the United Nations Sustainable Development Goals, including Goal 3.5 on prevention and treatment of substance abuse, as well as targets relating to education, gender equality and inclusive institutions.

== Values and approach ==
IBC describes its work as based on Christian values while providing services without discrimination on religious or other grounds. Its stated organizational values are love, solidarity, excellence, respect, empowerment, inclusiveness and good governance.

The organization promotes a holistic approach to health and well-being that takes physical, mental, social and spiritual dimensions into account, and describes its professional approach as combining evidence-based practice with experiential learning and scientific knowledge.

== United Nations status ==
International Blue Cross has held special consultative status with the United Nations Economic and Social Council (ECOSOC) since 2016.

== See also ==
- Temperance movement
- Alcohol-related harm
- Substance abuse prevention
- Addiction
