= Dagen (Swedish newspaper) =

Christian newspaper in Sweden

- Founder: Lewi Pethrus
- Founded: 11 November 1945; 80 years ago
- Language: Swedish
- Country: Sweden

Dagen, or since the early 2000s Nya Dagen, is a daily newspaper in Sweden with the expressed purpose of being a Christian voice in the media noise.

== History and profile ==
The first issue of the newspaper was published on 1 November 1945. Lewi Pethrus, the leader of the Pentecostal movement in Sweden was its founder and its chief editor until his death in 1974. During this period the paper was the mouthpiece of the Pentecostal movement in Sweden. This lasted until the 1990s when the paper expanded its profile and changed its management structure due to financial problems.

== Nya Dagen ==
In the early 2000s the paper was relaunched under the name of Nya Dagen (meaning 'The New Day' in English). The circulation of Nya Dagen was 18,400 copies in 2006.
