= Vineyard Norden Summer Camp =

Vineyard Norden Summer Camp is a Christian family camp held for one week every summer for many years by Vineyard Norden, an association of Nordic and Scandinavian churches. It is a branch of the international Christian Association of Vineyard Churches, also known as the Vineyard Movement or Vineyard Christian Fellowship.

== Location ==
In the first years the camp was arranged for circulation between the Vineyard churches in Norway, Sweden and Denmark. Denmark later had to withdraw as a location country, because there are only a few Vineyard Churches in that country. After some years arranging the camp, it circulated between the Norwegian and the Swedish churches. It was held in Sweden in 2003-04 and 2006–07; Norway in 2002, 2005 and 2008.

=== 2002 to 2008 ===
==== Sweden ====
- 2003 at Hjälmaregåden conference center, by Sweden's 4th largest lake.
- 2004, 2006, 2007 at Liljeholmens college, by the village of Rimforsa in Kinda Municipality in Östergötland County, not far from the town of Vimmerby where children's writer Astrid Lindgren was born.

==== Norway ====
- 2002 at the city Kristiansand, county capital of Vest-Agder.
- 2005 at Stavern Folkehøyskole Fredtun, Stavern, just south of the town of Larvik
- 2008 at Risøy folk high school on the island of Risøy which lies just east of the village of Gjeving in Tvedestrand Municipality, Aust-Agder fylke, Norway.

=== 2009 onwards ===
Vineyard Nordic Summer Camp has, since 2009, been held in Sweden at Nyhem, which is owned and run by the Swedish pentecostal Christian movement, Pingströrelsen. One of the main reasons cited to stay in Nyhem was the large new big hall, Nyhemshallen (the Nyhem Hall) built in 2008.

== Participants ==
Vineyard Norden Summer Camp has many participants from all over the Nordic countries, as well as guests from other parts of the world.

Summer Camp normally gathers between 800 and 1000 diverse participants, ranging from campers (people with tents or caravans that make their own food) to people who buy full accommodation and food. There are various types of accommodations.

Vineyard Nordic Summer Camp is a Nordic camp (with English and Scandinavian translations), but every year there are guests from at least one eastern European Vineyard church (normally one that is supported by the Vineyard Nordic churches or cooperate with the Vineyard Nordic churches). There are also guests from other places in Europe, and even from the US, Canada, South Africa and other far away places.

== Well-known characteristics ==
Well-known characteristics for a Vineyard Nordic Summer Camp are an equal mix of social interaction (a very important element in the Christian Vineyard Movement), meetings, seminars, and diverse free time activities for all ages. There are also really popular "night cafés" where the participants meet informally over a cup of coffee or something "to bite" with entertainment from the scene (everything from ballads and poems to blues and rock). One night during the week is "Open Scene" where everyone can just "pop up".
