= Lewi Pethrus =

Swedish minister and hymnwriter (1884–1974)

Pastor Lewi Pethrus
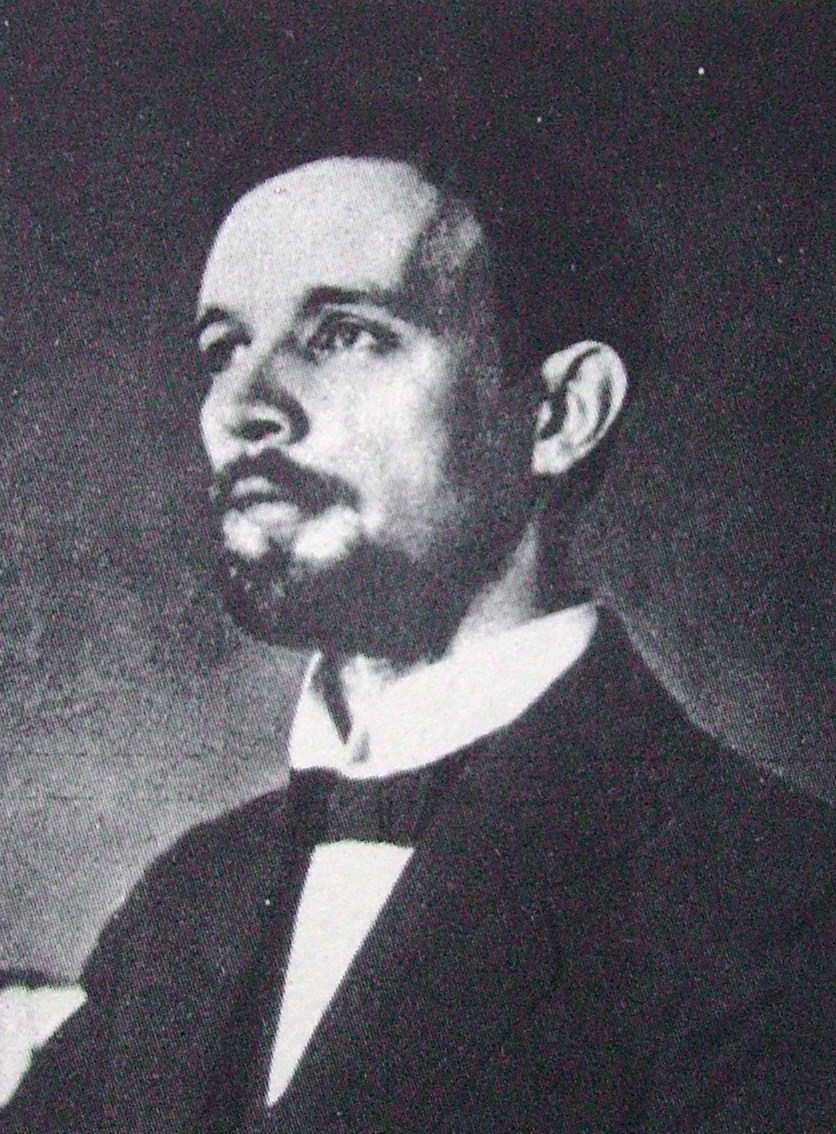
- Lewi Pethrus in 1937
- Born: Pethrus Lewi Johansson; 11 March 1884; Vargön, Västra Tunhem, Älvsborg, Sweden
- Died: 4 September 1974 (aged 90); Stockholm, Sweden
- Education: Bethel Seminary (Betelseminariet) in Stockholm
- Spouse: Lydia Danielsen

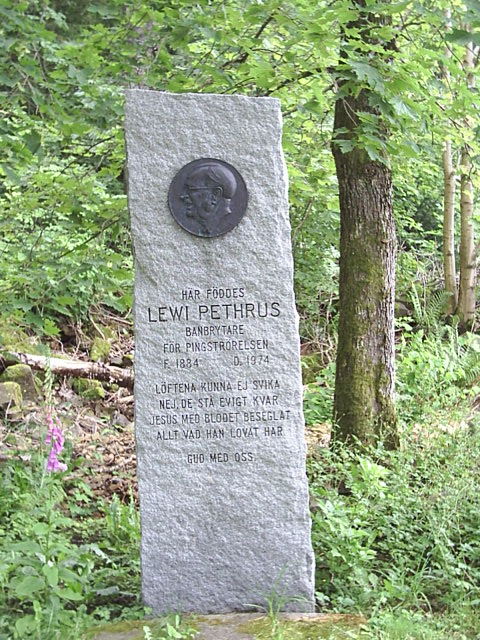
Lewi Pethrus memorial stone

Lewi Pethrus (born Pethrus Lewi Johansson; 11 March 1884 – 4 September 1974) was a Swedish Pentecostal minister who played a decisive role in the formation and development of the Pentecostal movement in his country. In 1964, he founded the political party the Christian Democrats.

== Life ==
Pethrus was born in 1884 in Vargön, Västergötland. He held manual jobs from the age of ten, being apprenticed to a shoe factory in 1899. That year, he was baptized in the Baptist church in Vänersborg. After emigrating to Norway in 1900, he became co-pastor of the Arendal Baptist Church in 1902, along with Adolf Mildes. He started speaking in tongues, believed by Pentecostals to be evidence of having received the baptism of the Holy Spirit after a series of meetings in Lillestrand. He claimed that the experience happened to him spontaneously and that he did not understand at the time what was happening to him.

Pethrus became pastor of a small Baptist church in Bengtsfors, Dalsland, Sweden, in 1903, but did not seek formal theological training until 1904, when he enrolled at the Bethel Seminary (Betelseminariet) in Stockholm. He was later to say that his training was detrimental to his faith. Exposure to the writings of liberal philosopher Viktor Rydberg temporarily undermined his faith in the divinity of Jesus, but claimed to have regained it after meeting Jesus personally in a vision.

After graduating from seminary, Pethrus completed his compulsory military service at Axevalla Hed, Västergötland, in the autumn of 1906. That year, he became pastor of the Lidköping Baptist Church.

Pethrus joined the Pentecostal movement in 1907 after meeting the Norwegian Pentecostal minister Thomas Ball Barratt in Oslo. It was then that the doctrine of the baptism in the Holy Spirit and speaking in tongues became clear to him; he claimed: "From that moment I was part of the Pentecostal Revival".

Pethrus became pastor of the Seventh Baptist Church in Stockholm in 1910 and of the Filadelfia Church in 1911. In 1913, the year in which he married Norwegian Lydia Danielsen, his church was expelled from the Swedish Baptist Union due to disagreements about speaking in tongues and holy communion (his church practiced open communion). This was the beginning of a separate Pentecostal movement in Sweden. During the same phase of his life Pethrus wrote the words and music for his gospel song "Löftena kunna ej svika" ('The promises cannot fail'). The Filadelfia Church started a Bible school in 1915 and a weekly magazine, Evangelii Härold 'The Gospel Herald', in 1916. In the same year, the church sent its first missionaries, Samuel and Lina Nyström, to Brazil, helping the Assembleias de Deus.

Pethrus and his Filadelfia Church sent many missionaries to Africa, Latin America and continental Europe, and kept ties with the North American Scandinavian Pentecostals belonging to the Fellowship of Christian Assemblies and the Independent Assemblies of God, International.

Pethrus sponsored the founding of a high school in 1942 and Dagen, a daily newspaper, in 1945. A credit fund was established in 1952 and a radio station, IBRA Radio (now IBRA Media) in Tangier, Morocco, in 1955. The same year, the Filadelfia Church hosted the Pentecostal World Conference.

Pethrus resigned from the pastorate on 7 September 1958. He continued preaching as an itinerant preacher, and established the Lewi Pethrus Trust for Philanthropic Endeavours (Swedish: Lewi Pethrus stiftelse för filantropisk verksamhet) in 1959. In 1964, he spearheaded the founding of Sweden's Christian Democratic Party. He had moved more into the sphere of politics since the 1940s, after denouncing it wholly during the early years of his ministry. The Christian Democrats were culturally conservative but supported the welfare state. His wife Lydia died on 30 December 1966. A year before his own death, he was made a Knight Commander of the Order of Vasa. His last sermon was delivered at the annual Nyhem Week Pentecostal convention in 1974, shortly before his death on 4 September. His autobiography, Ett sagolikt liv (A storied life) was published in 1976.

== Cultural references ==
In 2001, Per Olov Enquist published a novel, Lewis resa, which is in part about the interactions between Pethrus and Sven Lidman.
