= Sven Lidman (lexicographer) =

Swedish lexicographer

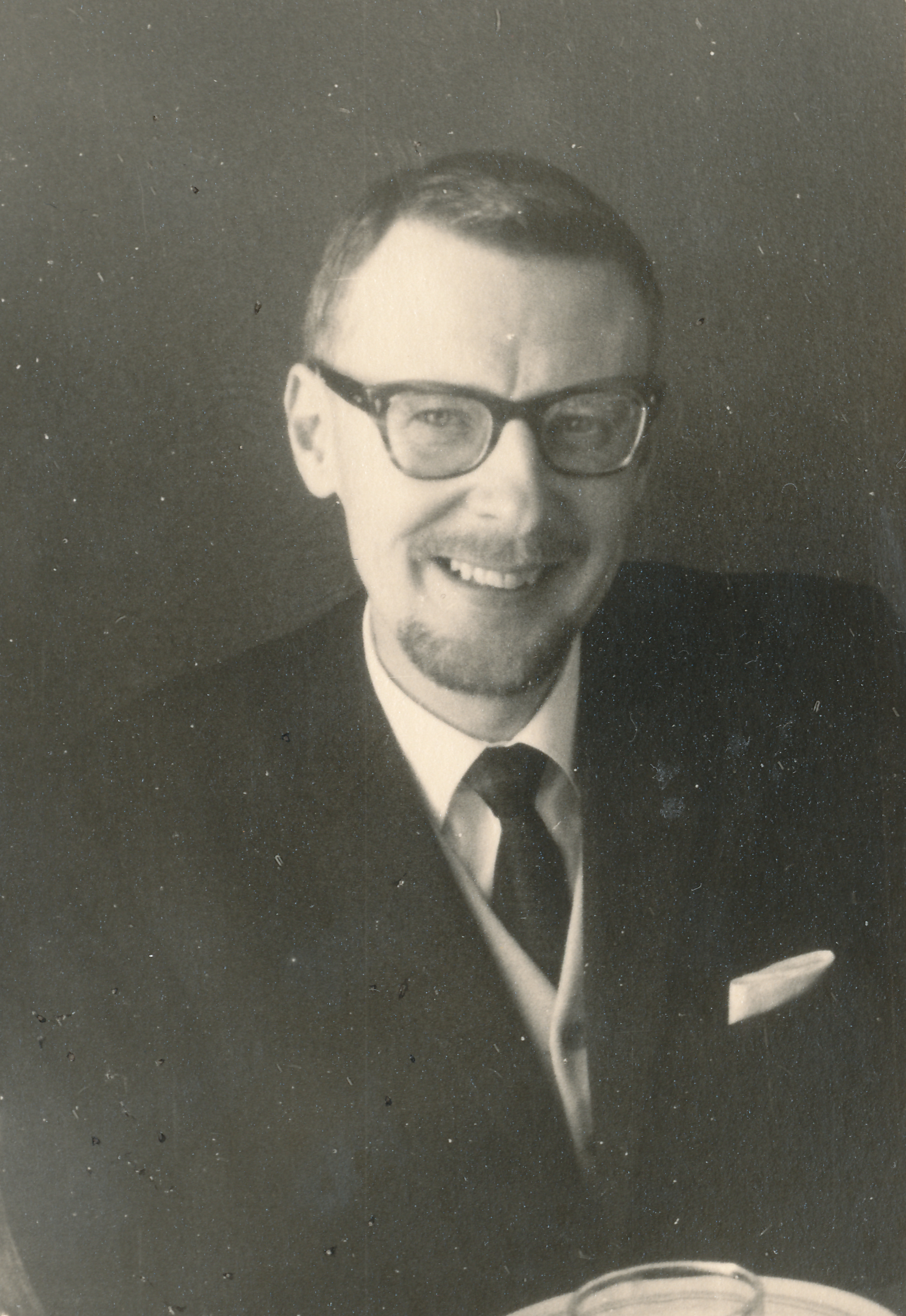
Sven Lidman

Sven Lidman (3 December 1921 – 28 February 2011) was a Swedish lexicographer living in Stockholm, son of the writer Sven Lidman.

He was the main editor or managing director of several Swedish encyclopedias, including the 5th edition of Kunskapens bok (9 volumes 1954–1955), Focus (5 volumes 1958–1960), Lilla Focus (1 volume 1961), Combi Visuell (5 volumes 1968–1970), Combi lexikon (2 volumes 1973), Familjens universallexikon (2 volumes 1975), Bonniers familjelexikon (20 volumes 1983–1986) and Bonniers stora lexikon (15 volumes 1985–1990). His ideas to use illustrations not to but with the text took European lexicography to new heights with Focus and Combi Visuell. The latter is a rare landmark in visualization from the same booming years that saw the first Moon landing.

In 1983, Lidman took the initiative to found Bild och Ord Akademin, the Swedish Academy of Verbovisual Communication, where he holds the honorary title of Preses Magnificus. Since its beginning in 1983, the Academy has awarded an annual Lidman Prize for good information in words and images.

His autobiography, Uppslagsboken och jag (1988), covering the 1950s to the 1970s was published after it was decided in 1985 that the Swedish state order for Nationalencyklopedin would go to a competing publisher. An updated autobiography was published in 2006, Fadern, sonen och den härliga bokbranschen. ISBN 91-85267-86-4. The two works overlap, but the latter contains more of personal reflexions and uses more of the illustration techniques that the author preaches, in addition to covering the 1990s. A continued chapter can be downloaded in PDF from the publisher's website (www.lindco.se).
