= Sven Lidman (clergyman) =

Swedish clergyman (1786–1845)

Sven Fredrik Lidman
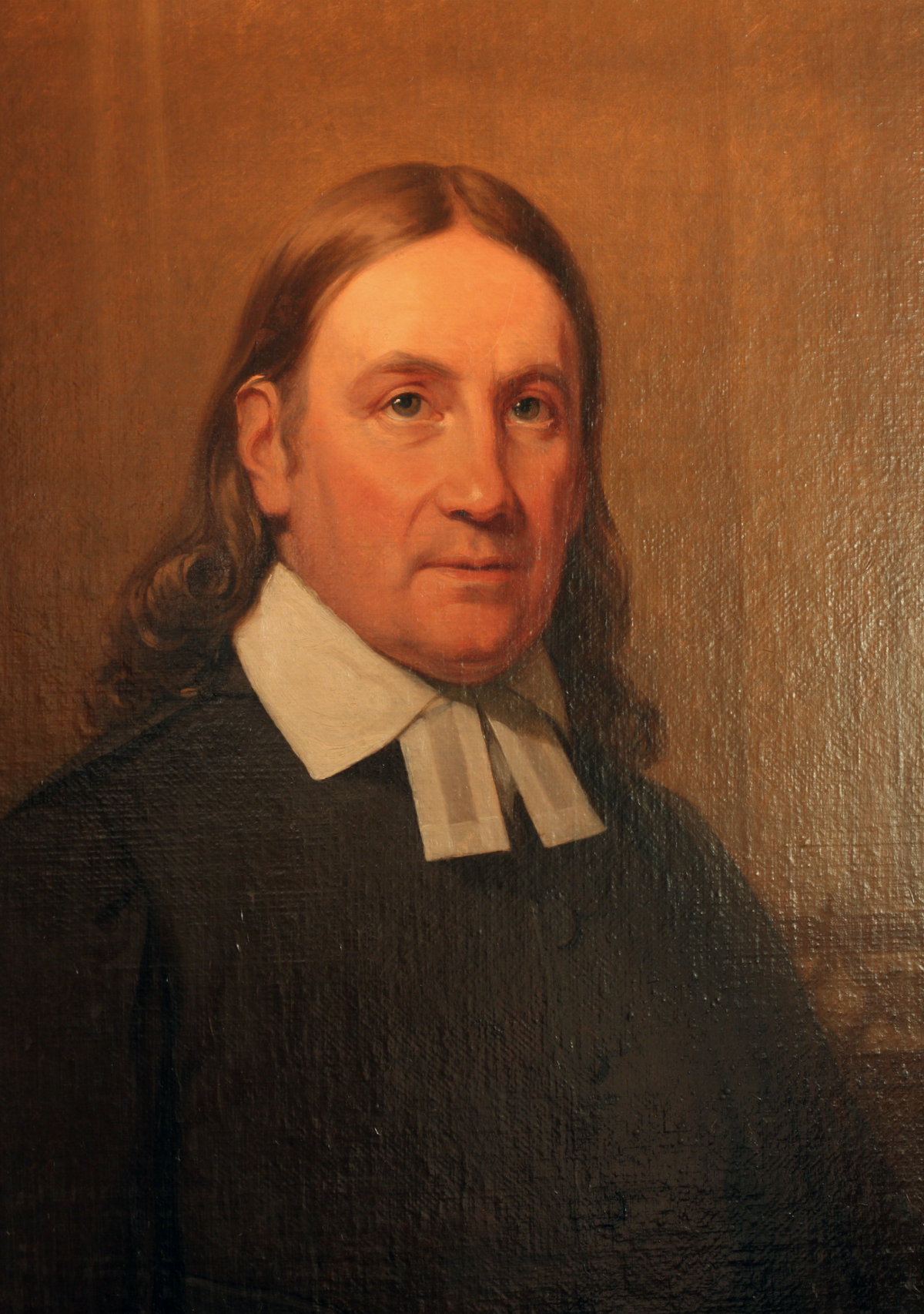
- Born: 11 December 1786; Norrköping, Sweden
- Died: 9 March 1845 (aged 58); Linköping, Sweden
- Education: Uppsala University
- Occupations: Lutheran priest and Orientalist

Sven Fredrik Lidman (11 December 1786 – 9 March 1845) was a Swedish priest and Orientalist.

Lidman was born in Norrköping, Sweden and received a PhD from Uppsala University in 1806 and became an ordained priest in the Evangelical-Lutheran Church of Sweden in 1811; in the same year he was also appointed as a lecturer of Arabic.

From 1811 to 1817, he served as a preacher at the Swedish legation in Constantinople (now Istanbul) where he purchased a number of antiquities from the French team at Luxor from Deir el-Medina; while Lidman's notebooks of his travels in Egypt survived, the collection was destroyed in fire in Constantinople in 1818. In 1817, he obtained a teaching position in Linköping, where he was appointed cathedral dean (domprost) in 1824. He represented the diocese of Linköping in the parliament.

== Death and legacy ==
He died in 1845 in Linköping, aged 58, and is interred in the family grave in the southeast corner of Linköping city cemetery.

Lidman was a member of the Geatish Society, using the pseudonym Sigurd Jorsalefarer.

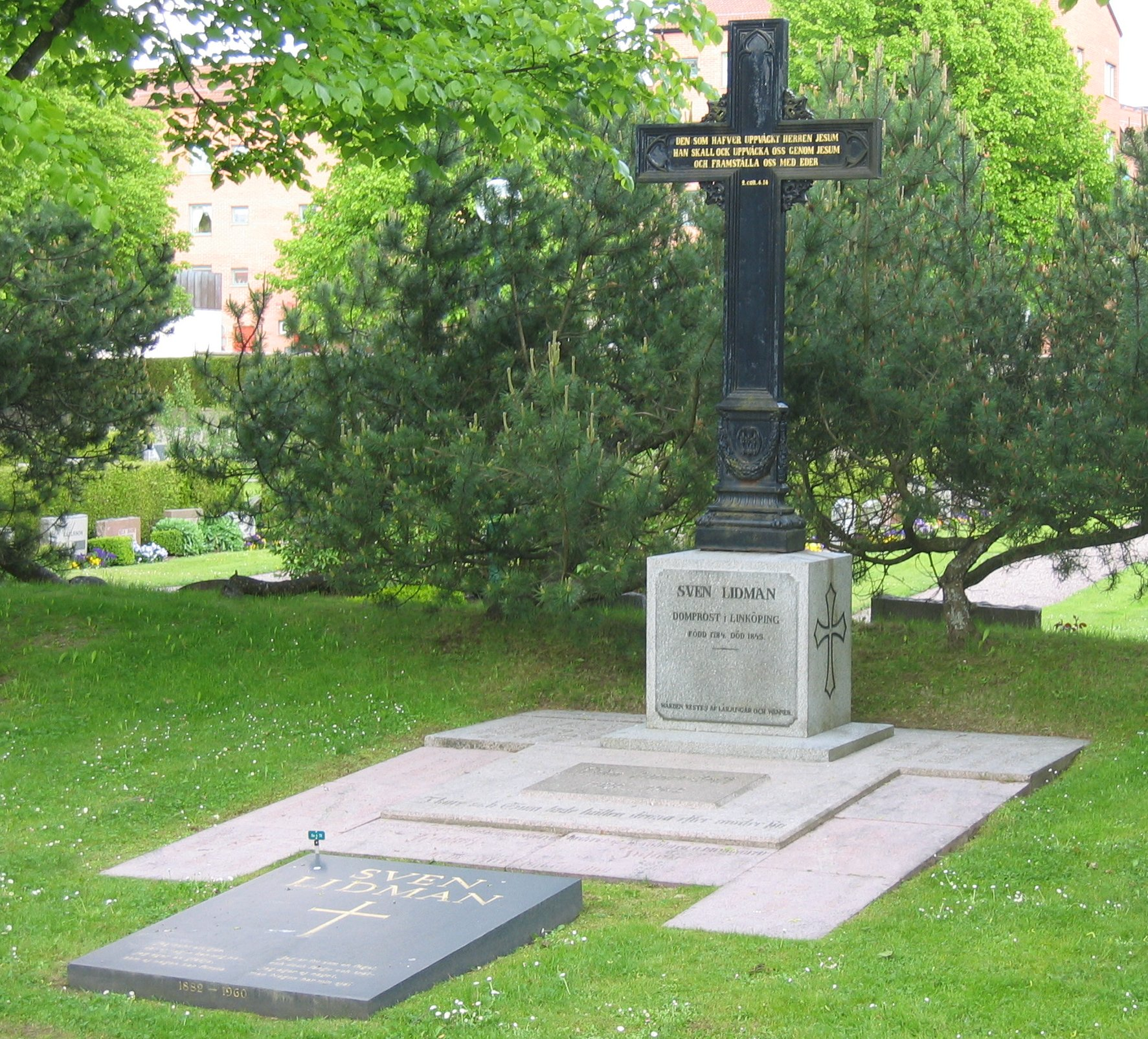
The Lidman family grave in Linköping, Sweden. Standing cross: the priest. Front black stone: the writer
