= Sven Lidman (writer) =

Swedish military officer, poet, writer and preacher

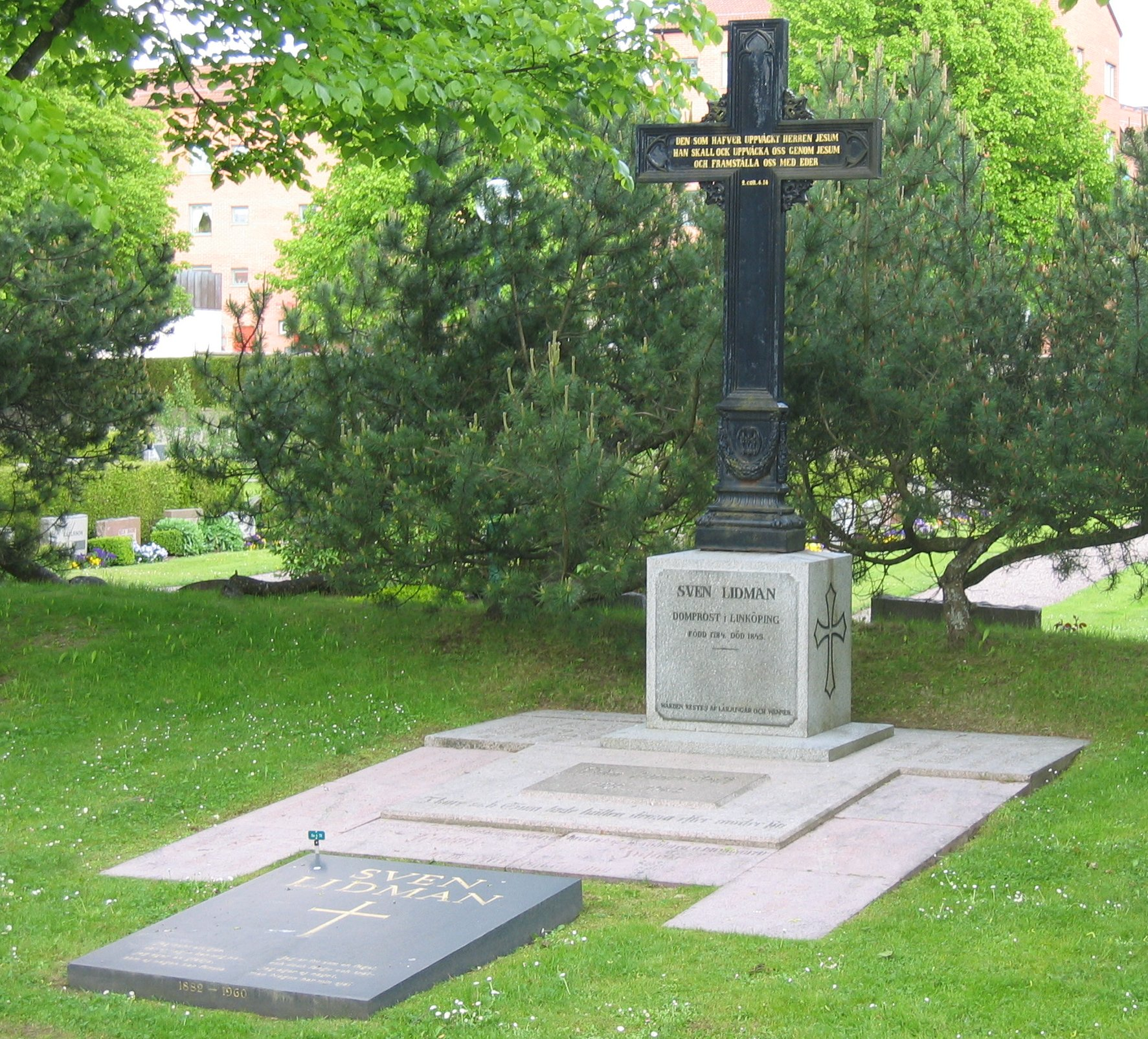
The Lidman family grave in Linköping, Sweden. Standing cross: the priest. Front black stone: the writer

Carl Hindrik Sven Rudolphsson Lidman (June 30, 1882 – February 14, 1960)—military officer, poet, writer, and preacher, grandson of the priest Sven Lidman—was born in Karlskrona, became a sublieutenant in the Swedish royal army reserve in 1903, and studied law at Uppsala University. He then began a promising career as a celebrated poet with Pasiphaë (1904), Primavera (1905), Källorna (1906), and Elden och altaret (1907). He also wrote the dramas Imperia (1907) and Härskare (1908), before starting to write novels: Stensborg (1910), Thure Gabriel Silfverstååhl (1910), Carl Silfverstååhls upplevelser (2nd edition, 1912), Köpmän och krigare (3rd edition, 1911), Tvedräktens barn (1913), and Det levande fäderneshuset (1916). In 1917 he went through a religious revival, which came out in his novels Huset med de gamla fröknarna (5th edition, 1919), Såsom genom eld (5th edition, 1920), Bryggan håller (1923), and Personlig frälsning (1924). In 1921 he joined the fast-growing Swedish Pentecostal movement, became the editor of its magazine Evangelii Härold, and was considered the movement's second-leading person next to founder Lewi Pethrus.

Lidman's autobiography was published in four parts: Gossen i grottan (1952), Lågan och lindansaren (1952), Mandoms möda (1954), and Vällust och vedergällning (1957). A biography was written by Knut Ahnlund, Sven Lidman: ett livsdrama (1996, ISBN 91-7486-316-9). Biographic and historic details also appear in Per Olov Enquist's 2001 novel Lewis Resa ('Levi's journey'), and in autobiographies by the younger Sven Lidman.

Lidman is interred in the family grave with his grandfather.
