= Bremer (surname) =

Bremer is a Germanic surname referring to residents of Bremen, Germany.

== Notable people who share the surname "Bremer" ==
- Andrew Bremer (born 1995), American Paralympic soccer player
- Anne Bremer (1868–1923), American painter
- Arthur Bremer (born 1950), American attempted assassin of George Wallace
- Birgitta Bremer (born 1950), Swedish botanist
- Caj Bremer (born 1929), Finnish photographer and photojournalist
- Carlos Bremer (1960–2024), Mexican businessman
- Chris-Carol Bremer (born 1971), German Olympic swimmer
- Dagmar Bremer (born 1963), German field hockey player
- Dick Bremer (born 1956), American sports broadcaster
- Edith Terry Bremer (1885–1964), American women's rights activist
- Eli Bremer (born 1978), American modern pentathlete
- Frédéric Bremer (1892–1982), Belgian neuroscientist
- Frederick Bremer (1872–1941), English inventor and engineer
- Fredrika Bremer (1801–1865), Swedish novelist
- Gene Bremer (1916–1971), American Negro league baseball pitcher
- Gerhard Bremer (1917–1989), German Waffen-SS officer during World War II
- Gordon Bremer (1786–1850), British naval officer
- Herb Bremer (1913–1979), American baseball catcher
- J. R. Bremer (born 1980), American basketball player
- Jacob Bremer (1711–1785), Swedish merchant
- Jan Maarten Bremer (1932–2023), Dutch classical scholar
- John Bremer (1927–2015), English classics educator
- Jürgen Bremer (born 1940), German slalom canoeist
- Kåre Bremer (born 1948), Swedish botanist
- Karl Heinz Bremer (1911–1942), German historian
- Kristen Kyrre Bremer (1925–2013), Norwegian theologian and bishop
- Lucille Bremer (1917–1996), American actress
- Martin Bremer (runner) (born 1970), German long-distance runner
- Martin Bremer (footballer)
- Otto Bremer (1867–1951), German American banker and philanthropist
- Otto Vasilievich Bremer (died 1873) Russian naturalist and entomologist
- Paul Bremer (born 1941), American diplomat and former administrator of the Iraqi Coalition Provisional Authority
- Pauline Bremer (born 1996), German footballer
- Rolf Bremer (1926–1991), German politician
- Ronnie Bremer (born 1978), Danish racecar driver
- Rosy Bremer (1971–2025), English anti-war activist
- Sarah Bremer (born 1999), German politician
- Sebastiaan Bremer (born 1970), Dutch visual artist
- Tor Bremer (born 1955), Norwegian politician
- Ulrika Fredrika Bremer (1746–1798), Finnish ship owner and merchant
- Undine Bremer (born 1961), German sprinter
- Väinö Bremer (1899–1964), Finnish biathlete and modern pentathlete
