= Misch =

Misch is a German surname. Notable people with the surname include:

- Carl E. Misch (1947–2017), American prosthodontist
- David Misch (born 1961), American serial killer
- Georg Misch (1878–1965), German philosopher
- Laura Misch (born 1953)
- Marion Simon Misch (1869–1941)
- Pat Misch (born 1981)
- Rochus Misch (1917–2013), German Oberscharführer and bodyguard for Adolf Hitler
- Tom Misch, musician (born 1995)

== See also ==
- Sehmisch, list of people with a similar surname
