= Bremer =

Bremer may refer to:

== People ==
- Bremer (surname)
- Bremer Ehrler (1914–2013), American politician
- Bremer (born 1997), Brazilian footballer

== Places ==
Australia

- Bremer Bay, Western Australia
- Bremer Marine Park
- Bremer Island
- Bremer River (disambiguation)

USA

- Bremer, Iowa, an unincorporated community
- Bremer County, Iowa
- Bremers Lake, a lake in McLeod County, Minnesota

== Other uses ==
- Bremer SV, a German football club
- ATSV 1860 Bremen, a former German football club, also known as Bremer SC
- The Bremer Institute of TAFE, an Australian TAFE institute
- Bremer 25, an American sailboat design
- Bremer Straßenbahn AG, German public transport provider
- Bremer Vulkan, a German shipbuilding company
- Bremer wall, used for protection by American forces in Iraq
- The Report of the National Commission on Terrorism, also known as the Bremer Commission
- Stadion an der Bremer Brücke, a German sports stadium

== See also ==
- Brehmer
- Bremmer (disambiguation)
- Bremen (disambiguation)
