= Felsenthal =

Felsenthal may refer to:

== People ==
- Bernhard Felsenthal (1822–1908), German-American rabbi
- Edward Felsenthal (born 1966), American journalist
- Francine Felsenthal (1922–2000), American artist
- Julia I. Felsenthal (1867–1954), American social worker

== Other ==
- Felsenthal, Arkansas
- Felsenthal National Wildlife Refuge
