= International Institute of Northwest Indiana =

The International Institute is an organization in Gary, Indiana in the United States, which teaches citizenship and English classes to immigrants. The organization was started in 1919 by a group of women who were creating a YWCA (Young Women Christian Association).

== Background ==
The International Institute was established in 1919 by a group of women. The organization was first the YWCA but then later was changed to the Department of Immigration and Foreign Communities. The International Institute in Gary became an independent group in 1934. The International Institute was added to Gary because there was an increase in immigration after the steel mill was built due to the increase in job availability. The main purpose of the organization was to aid foreign-born women and children. Social services with a focus on issues of immigration and citizenship were provided by funding from the institute. The institutions were located in heavily populated areas with high immigration. The institution wanted to help immigrants transition into their new lives in America. They thought it was important for people to keep their cultural identity and encouraged them to speak their native language but also learn American traditions. Also, the institutes helped American's learn and understand other countries cultures.

The main goal of the International Institute is to help immigrant women adjust to life in America and culture. Institutes such as school, political parties, and churches were trying to Americanize immigrants. These institutes wanted immigrants to adapt to American culture and blend into American life. The only institute that did not want immigrants to Americanize was the International Institute.

== Activities ==
The International Institute had English classes and citizenship classes. In 1932, Gary's International Institute created its first citizenship and English classes. To keep the heritage of the immigrants, the institute started individual groups of different cultures, such as a Polish group or an Italian group. They created different kinds of cultural groups for different activities, such as cooking or dancing.
