= Martin Bremer =

Martin Bremer may refer to:

- Martin Bremer (runner)
- Martin Bremer (footballer)
