= Brehmer =

Brehmer is a surname. Notable people with the surname include:

- Anton Brehmer (born 1994), Swedish ice hockey player
- Christina Brehmer-Lathan (born 1958), East German Olympic sprinter
- Heike Brehmer (born 1962), German politician
- Hermann Brehmer (1826–1889), German physician
- K.P. Brehmer, in full, Klaus Peter Brehmer (1938–1997), German painter
- Lin Brehmer (1954–2023), American disc jockey and radio personality
- Manuel Brehmer (born 1978), German rower
- Roland Brehmer (born 1943), Polish Olympic long-distance runner

== See also ==
- Bremer (disambiguation)
- Bremmer (disambiguation)
