= List of Ellis Island immigrants =

Ellis Island was the gateway for about 12 million immigrants to the United States as the nation's busiest immigrant inspection station for over sixty years from 1892 until 1954. The island, in Upper New York Bay, was greatly expanded with land reclamation between 1892 and 1934. Before that, the much smaller original island was the site of Fort Gibson and later a naval magazine. The island was made part of the Statue of Liberty National Monument in 1965 and has hosted a museum of immigration since 1990.

Below is a list of Ellis Island immigrants who attained notability in the United States.

Date	Name	Country	Profession	Ref.
1913	Louis Adamic	Slovenia	Author	
1909	Joe Adonis	Italy	Mobster	
1902	Theophrastos Anagnostopoulos	Greece	Father of U.S. Vice President Spiro Agnew	
1923	Isaac Asimov	Russia	Science fiction writer	
1903	Charles Atlas	Italy	Bodybuilder	
1920	Mischa Auer	Russia	Actor	
1914	Monty Banks	Italy	Actor, director	
1906	Abraham Beame	England	Politician, Mayor of New York City	
1914	Ludwig Bemelmans	Austria	Author, illustrator	
1893	Irving Berlin	Russia	Composer, lyricist	
1914	Ettore Boiardi	Italy	Chef ("Chef Boyardee")	
1908	Joseph Bonanno	Italy	Mobster, head of Bonanno crime family	
1907	Irène Bordoni	France	Actor, singer	
1922	George Brent	Ireland	Actor	
1917	Joseph Calleia	Malta	Actor, singer	
1906	Louis Capozzoli	Italy	Member, U.S. House of Representatives	
1903	Frank Capra	Italy	Film director, producer, writer	
1913	Caesar Cardini	Italy	Restaurateur, chef, created Caesar salad	
1911	Tom Carvel	Greece	Businessman, created Carvel ice cream	
1913	Cipriano Castro	Venezuela	Politician, military leader, President of Venezuela	
1911	George Christopher	Greece	Politician, Mayor of San Francisco	
1914	Stoyan Christowe	Bulgaria	Journalist, politician	
1906	Claudette Colbert	France	Actor	
1920	Ronald Colman	England	Actor	
1915	Xavier Cugat	Spain/Cuba	Bandleader	
1919	Lilly Daché	France	Milliner, fashion designer	
1916	Karl Dane	Denmark	Actor, comedian	
1921	Ellen Dawson	Scotland	Political activist, trade unionist	
1907	Pietro Deiro	Italy	Accordionist	
1912	Reginald Denny	England	Actor, aviator	
1926	Lya De Putti	Hungary	Actor	
1929	Max Dimont	Finland	Historian, author	
1921	Vernon Duke	Russia	Composer	
1906	Max Factor	Poland	Cosmetologist, founder, Max Factor & Company	
1909	Frank Fenton	England	Writer	
1909	Leslie Fenton	England	Actor, director	
1904	Edward J. Flanagan	Ireland	Priest, founder, Boys Town	
1894	Felix Frankfurter	Austria	Jurist, Associate Justice of the U.S. Supreme Court	
1895	Kahlil Gibran	Lebanon	Writer	
1916	Leon Gilmour	Russia	Artist, printmaker	
1920	Arshile Gorky	Armenia	Painter	
1920	Cary Grant	England	Actor	
1905	Cecilia Greenstone	Poland	Social worker	
1923	Richard Hauptmann	Germany	Convicted murderer	
1911	Gayelord Hauser	Germany	Nutritionist, self-help author	
1937	Dick Haymes	Argentina	Singer, songwriter, actor	
1907	Sidney Hillman	Russia	Trade union leader	
1892	Franciszek Hodur	Poland	Bishop, founder, Polish National Catholic Church	
1908	Bob Hope	England	Comedian	
1928	Vladimir Horowitz	Russia	Concert pianist	
1906	Sol Hurok	Russia	Impresario	
1901	Vincent R. Impellitteri	Italy	Politician, Mayor of New York City	
	Sven Johnson	Sweden	Gymnast	
1894	Al Jolson	Lithuania	Singer, actor, comedian	
1921	Hubert Julian	Trinidad and Tobago	Aviator	
1890	Gus Kahn	Germany	Tin Pan Alley lyricist	
1913	Elia Kazan	Turkey	Director, writer, actor	
1912	Ruby Keeler	Canada	Actor, dancer, singer	
1922	John Kluge	Germany	Entrepreneur, one-time richest person in the U.S.	
1909	Dan Kolov	Bulgaria	Wrestler	
1912	Eva Kotchever	Poland	Writer, founder of the Eve's Hangout in New York	
1941	Wanda Landowska	Poland	Harpsichordist	
1906	Lucky Luciano	Italy	Mobster, boss of Genovese crime family	
1921	Bela Lugosi	Hungary	Actor, portrayed Count Dracula	
1922	George Mardikian	Armenia	Restaurateur	
1912	Morris Markin	Russia	Businessman, founder, Checker Cab Company	
1920	Ross Martin	Poland	Actor	
1921	Reuben Mattus	Poland	Founder, Häagen-Dazs	
1921	Rose Mattus	England	Founder, Häagen-Dazs	
	John McCormack	Ireland	Singer, tenor and opera	
1912	Claude McKay	Jamaica	Harlem Renaissance poet and writer	
1912	Mike McTigue	Ireland	Boxing champion	
1892	Annie Moore	Ireland	First immigrant inspected at Ellis Island	
1896	Joe Moore	Ireland	Actor	
1896	Matt Moore	Ireland	Actor, director	
1896	Owen Moore	Ireland	Actor	
1896	Tom Moore	Ireland	Actor, director	
1901	Antonio Moreno	Spain	Actor, director	
1923	Alan Mowbray	England	Actor	
1922	Joseph Murphy	Ireland	New Thought author and minister	
1897	Arthur Murray	Poland	Dancer, businessman	
1907	Nicholas Musuraca	Italy	Cinematographer	
1941	Pola Negri	Poland	Actor	
1901	Pauline Newman	Lithuania	Labor activist	
1905	Anna Q. Nilsson	Sweden	Actor	
1904	Louis Nizer	England	Trial lawyer	
1894	Warner Oland	Sweden	Actor	
1910	Rafaela Ottiano	Italy	Actor	
1922	George Papashvily	Georgia	Writer, sculptor	
1901	Mitchell Parish	Russia	Lyricist	
	Joe Penner	Hungary	Vaudeville and radio comedian	
1942	Ezio Pinza	Italy	Opera singer	
1921	Pearl Primus	Trinidad and Tobago	Dancer, choreographer	
1926	Ayn Rand	Russia	Novelist, philosopher	
1904	Hyman G. Rickover	Poland	U.S. Navy Admiral	
1904	Edward G. Robinson	Romania	Actor	
1893	Knute Rockne	Norway	Football coach	
1898	Ole Edvart Rølvaag	Norway	Novelist, professor	
1900	Michael Romanoff	Lithuania	Restaurateur, conman, actor	
1908	Henry Roth	Poland	Novelist	
1908	Onorio Ruotolo	Italy	Sculptor, poet	
	Arthur Rubinstein	Poland	Pianist	
1924	Sig Ruman	Germany	Comedian	
	Dalip Singh Saund	India	Politician, U.S. Congressman	
1924	John H. Secondari	Italy	Author, television producer	
1906	Ben Shahn	Lithuania	Painter	
1923	Battling Siki	Senegal	Boxer	
1919	Igor Sikorsky	Russia	Aviation pioneer	
1910	Spyros Skouras	Greece	Film executive	
1896	Joseph Stella	Italy	Painter	
	Michael Strank	Slovakia	U.S. Marine Corps sergeant, Raising the Flag on Iwo Jima	
1909	Erich von Stroheim	Austria	Director, actor, producer	
1914	Jule Styne	England	Composer	
1946	Yma Sumac	Peru	Singer	
1906	Arthur Tracy	Russia	Singer, actor	
1938	Maria von Trapp	Austria	Singer, matriarch of Trapp Family Singers	
1936	Pauline Trigère	France	Fashion designer	
1913	Rudolph Valentino	Italy	Actor	
1905	Abraham Vereide	Norway	Minister, founder, Goodwill Industries	
1905	Johnny Weissmuller	Romania	Swimmer, Olympic medalist, actor	
1907	Frances Winwar	Italy	Biographer, translator, writer	
1893	Anzia Yezierska	Poland	Novelist	
	Henny Youngman	England	Comedian, violinist	

== See also ==
- Lists of Americans
- List of naturalized American citizens
