= Nina Morais Cohen =

American suffragette

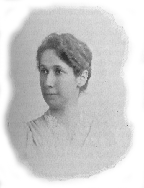
- Born: Bonina Morais; December 6, 1855; Philadelphia, Pennsylvania, U.S.
- Died: February 19, 1918 (aged 62); Minneapolis, Minnesota, U.S.
- Occupations: Suffragist, essayist
- Spouse: Emanuel Cohen (m. 1885)

Nina Morais Cohen (born December 6, 1855, Philadelphia, U.S., died February 19, 1918, Minneapolis, US) was a suffragist, author, and educator. She was a founding member of the National Council of Jewish Women and a leader of the woman's club movement in Minneapolis.

== Biography ==
Nina Morais Cohen was born "Bonina Morais" on December 6, 1855, in Philadelphia. Her mother, Clara Esther Weil, was German-American. Her father, Sabato Morais, was an immigrant from Livorno, an abolitionist, and the rabbi of Congregation Mikveh Israel from 1851 to 1897. Nina had six younger siblings, who she raised herself after her mother died in 1872.

Morais Cohen was a gifted writer, and upon her graduation from the Girls’ Normal School, became a popular teacher of English literature. She was a frequent contributor to both Jewish and secular journals and magazines, publicly advocating for gender equality. In 1882, a Miss M. A. Hardaker published an editorial in Popular Science that demeaned women's intelligence using the debunked science of phrenology, claiming that women were less intelligent than men because they had smaller brains and ate less. Morais Cohen wrote a satirical response with her trademark cutting wit, published in the following issue:

"Any reasoning which excludes women as a class from the advantages of equal mental training with men, on the ground that they must be the mothers of the race, is forcing the activity of women into one channel, and rendering all other efforts (such as the writing of a scientific article, perhaps) unnatural and unwomanly… Miss Hardaker would slam the educational doors in women's faces because, being smaller, they are unfit to enter the select retreats of Brobdingnag. But, if justice is to prevail in the rules of admission, the woman who possesses a brain of fifty-six ounces is entitled to precedence over the great majority of males whose brains weigh only forty-nine and a half. Should the environment be more favorable to the woman whose brain-weight is forty-four ounces, she can claim the advantage over the larger male brain whose environment is less favorable. Then, too, the applicants for entrance must be subjected to the test of an eating-match, and the dyspeptic must consent to suicide or rejection. All this must be done, for, although Justice carries her scales, she is blindfolded. She can only weigh brains, food, environment, but can not see the sex of suitors for admission into the new academy."

In 1886, she and her husband, Emmanuel Cohen, moved to Minneapolis, where Morais Cohen continued to advocate for women's rights as a member of the Minnesota Women's Suffrage Association and the College Women's Club. Morais Cohen was a nationally renowned activist, and hosted Susan B. Anthony on a visit to Minneapolis.

In 1893, Morais Cohen attended the Chicago World's Fair. She was an original member of the National Council of Jewish Women, a women's advocacy organization founded during the Fair's Congress of World Religions to advocate for women's rights, immigrant rights, policies to benefit women and families, and community volunteer work. Upon her return to Minneapolis, she organized NCJW's St. Paul Section and was elected president of the Minneapolis Section, and from that point on, devoted the majority of her work to NCJW. She was also a patron of arts, publicly lectured about classical literature, and raised funds to build a memorial to Shelley and Keats in Rome.

Throughout her life, Nina Morais Cohen was a prolific writer, passionate activist for women's suffrage, and an influential leader in the small but close-knit Jewish community in Minneapolis at the turn of the century. She died on February 19, 1918, at her home on Third Avenue in Minneapolis.
