= Morton Mandel =

American businessperson

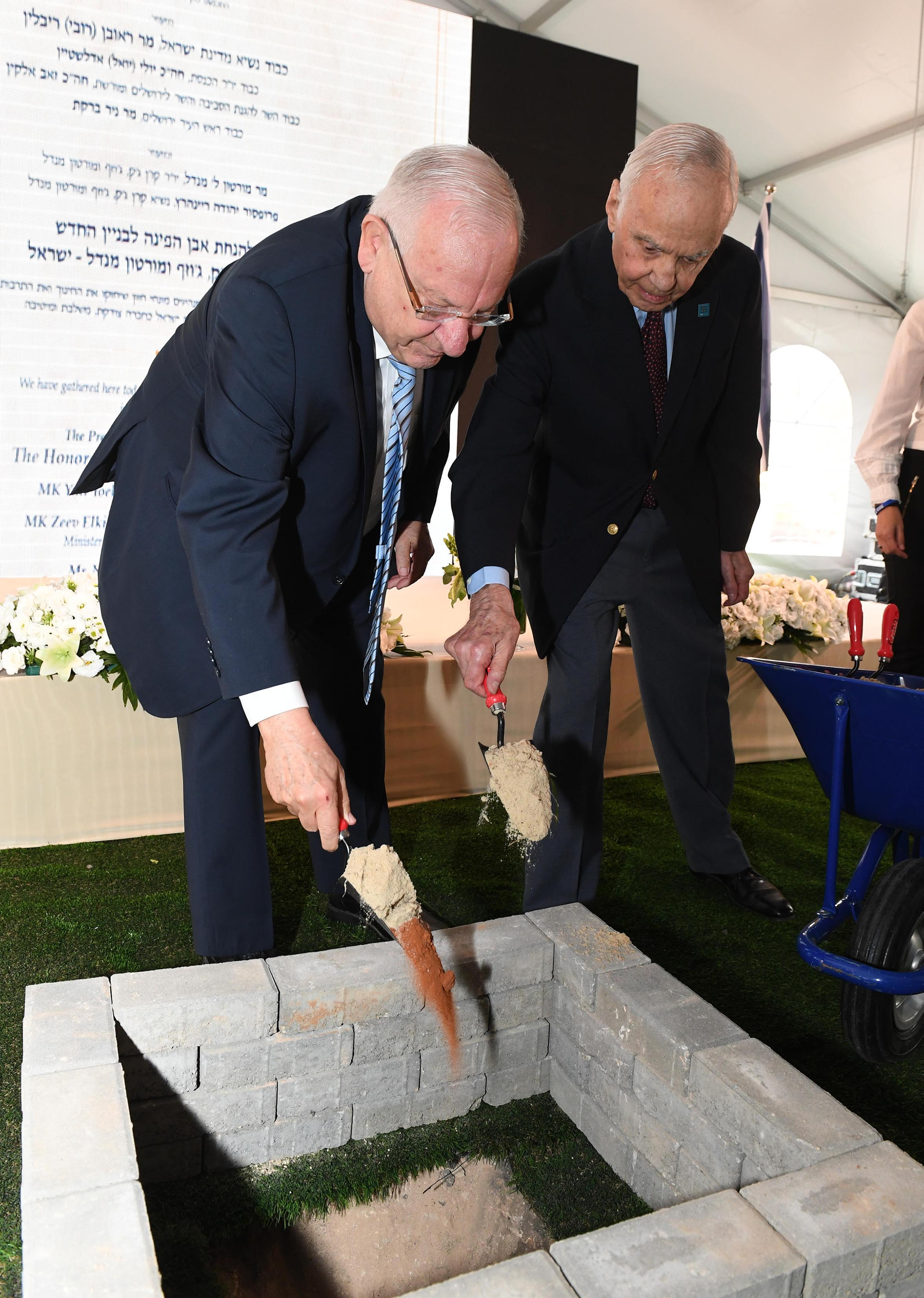
- Born: Morton Leon Mandel; September 19, 1921; Cleveland, Ohio, U.S.
- Died: October 16, 2019 (aged 98); Florida, U.S.
- Education: Case Western Reserve University
- Occupation: Businessman
- Spouse: Barbara Mandel (m. 1949)
- Website: mortonmandel.com

Morton Leon Mandel (September 19, 1921 – October 16, 2019) was an American business magnate, entrepreneur, and philanthropist. Along with his two brothers, Jack and Joe, he founded the Premier Automotive Supply Company in 1940, which later became one of the world's leading industrial parts and electronic components distributors. His philanthropic activities in Cleveland, and in Jewish and Israeli institutions, were via the Mandel Foundation.

Mandel received a bachelor's degree and eleven honorary doctorates.

== Biography ==
Mandel was born to a Jewish family in Cleveland, Ohio. His mother, Rose, along with his older siblings, Meriam Ellen (died June 10, 2010, age 100, nine days before age 101), Jack N. (died May 12, 2011, age 99), and Joseph C. (died March 22, 2016, age 102), immigrated from Galicia to the United States on June 19, 1920, with the help of the Red Cross. Morton's father, Simon, had already immigrated from Nowy Sącz in Poland to the United States in 1913, planning to bring his family once he became established in Ohio.

Morton was born 15 months after his mother's immigration, in Cleveland, where his parents ran a dry goods shop. The family then moved several times because they could not afford to pay their monthly rent. Growing up, Mandel shared a room with his two brothers, wore hand-me-downs, and had few financial means. However, despite their economic difficulties, Mandel's mother often gave the little she had to charity. His family continued its Jewish tradition, sending young Mandel to an afternoon Hebrew school.

After his bar mitzvah, at age 13, he started working after school selling hot dogs, drinks, peanuts, and popcorn at Cleveland Municipal Stadium. Mandel's father suffered from multiple sclerosis, and as the disease progressed, he had to be taken care of by his wife. Eventually he became bedridden and his wife became the sole provider for the family, selling clothing out of suitcases on the streets of Cleveland. After graduating from high school, Mandel attended the chemistry program at Adelbert College, but dropped out in his second year to join the automotive parts shop that he and his brothers had purchased from their uncle, Jacob Mandel.

In February 1949, Mandel met Barbara (née Abrams) whom he later married, and with whom he had three children, Amy, Thom, and Stacy. Mandel and his wife own homes in Cleveland, Florida, and New York.

In 1967, after the Six-Day War, Mandel and his wife first visited Israel, which along with his involvement in the Jewish community in Cleveland, became an important part of his life.

In 2012, Mandel published his book It's All About Who You Hire, How They Lead ... and Other Essential Advice from a Self-Made Leader explaining his business and philanthropic philosophy. The book was also published in China and Israel.

On May 19, 2013, Mandel received his bachelor's degree from Case Western Reserve University, after completing the academic studies started during his first enrollment, in 1939. He was an active member of Zeta Beta Tau fraternity.

Mandel died on October 16, 2019, at his home in Florida.

== Military service ==
In 1943, Mandel was recruited by the U.S. Army to fight in World War II. A few months after he enlisted, the Army sent him and thousands of others back to school, due to fear of a wartime shortage of engineers. Mandel spent two years as a student for the Army, first at Pomona College in Claremont, California, and later at the University of California, Berkeley. In 1946, once the war was over, Mandel, now a 2nd Lieutenant, was sent back home to Cleveland.

She taught me about life, courage and believing in myself that I can do great things, and if I do not succeed the first time, I'll try again. ... My mother helped me reach success. She kept on saying - I expect great things from you.

— Mandel on his mother

During his service in World War II, Mandel was put in charge of transporting fifteen wounded American soldiers from an army hospital in Memphis to another hospital further south. Along the way, the group stopped for lunch. The African American soldiers in the group were refused admission to the restaurant, one in which German prisoners of war were being served. Outraged by this act of racism, Mandel took the group away from the restaurant, where they would have been able to pay with meal vouchers, and bought them sandwiches from a street vendor.

== Business career ==
In the spring of 1940, Mandel's uncle, Jacob Mandel, decided to leave Cleveland for Chicago, and offered to sell his auto repair shop to Mandel's brother, Jack. Jack gathered his two brothers, Joe, who sold soap, and Morton, who worked in the shop after school, and opened their first business. They spent their $900 savings to buy it and also received a $3,000 loan for inventory from their uncle, Conrad Mandel. On August 1, 1940, they opened Premier Automotive Supply Company, which sold car parts.

=== Premier Industrial Corporation ===
In 1945, upon Mandel's return from service, he returned to his family's business with Joe, who had also returned from a job in a war plant, and Jack, who had kept the business running during his brothers' service. Following his return, Mandel acted as general manager of the company and handled the business's management. Originally an auto-parts distributor, Premier Automotive was incorporated as Premier Autoware in 1946. Shortly after, the brothers realized that their parts were also being sold by many other distributors, and that their resulting profit margin was barely enough to live on. After a few months of asking their customers what parts they needed, they formed a list of "hard to get" parts, and found sources to buy them. They then sold those "hard to get" parts, and as a result, their sales increased with a large demand and their business began to grow.

We learned basic philosophy. If you find a need and fill it, you have something that will lead to growth.

— Mandel on his business philosophy

The brothers also founded their business around the principles of customer service, using such slogans as "Killing Yourself for Your Customer", "Always Trying to Raise the Bar", and "A Focus on Our People". In fulfillment of this goal, they hired an engineer who was responsible for assisting and understanding their customers' needs. Later, they built a customer service department that operated 24-hours, including holidays and weekends, answering and handling clients' needs. An example of this service is when a ride at Walt Disney World broke down on a Saturday and the company had the necessary part shipped within hours that same day.

They later acquired an electronic supply division, which led the company to expand its scope and business. In 1955, Mandel hired Bob Warren, who helped transform the company, and in 1972 became its President. In May 1960 the company changed its name to the Premier Industrial Corporation, and Mandel launched its initial public offering, with his brothers retaining 70% of the ownership. Four years later, the company was listed on the NYSE. This allowed the company to acquire more than a dozen industrial and electronic parts companies. The purchase of Newark Electronics, in 1968, significantly expanded the company's reach into the electronic components business. In addition to specializing in the distribution of electronics equipment, maintenance products, and firefighting equipment, Premier Industrial Corporation also marketed a wide range of products including lubricants, welding supplies, and fasteners to its over 100,000 customers around the world.

In the late 1960s, Mandel began working in the Cleveland business community, serving as a Director of the Central National Bank of Cleveland and the Cleveland Electric Illuminating Co. until 1979, when he left them to focus on philanthropic activities. As Premier Industrial Corporation grew, Mandel met on a monthly basis with Peter Drucker, who consulted on various matters regarding the company.

In the 1970s, the Premier Industrial Corporation began operation in Europe, and by 1977, the firm had opened a corporate research and development center, where the company tailored its products to customers' needs. By 1984, the company had 18 divisions, with electronics constituting half of $465 million in sales, and the company making a net profit of $48 million. It later became one of the largest U.S. distributors of auto parts and electronic components. During his stay at the Palm Beach Country Club, Mandel met Bernard Madoff, and although most of his advisors favored investing in Madoff's fund, Mandel declined because of Madoff's lack of transparency. Premier Industrial Corporation earned numerous business awards, including being one of fifty top companies profiled in the 1995 book, Making It in America.

In 1996, when Premier Industrial Corporation had 16 different divisions and was worth nearly $3 billion, it merged with the British company Farnell Electronics PLC to form Premier Farnell PLC, one of largest industrial and electronic components supplier in the world. Mandel served as the Deputy Chairman of Premier Farnell until 2002.

During Mandel's 36 years as the Chairman of the Premier Industrial Corporation, the company had 34 years which ended in profit growth and in 30 of those years, its net profit after taxes, was more than 10% of its business operations.

=== Business ventures in Israel ===
Mandel's first business involvement in Israel occurred in 2003, when Parkwood Corporation, the Mandel Brothers' private investment company, established Israel Equity Limited (IEL). Mandel served as Chairman of this company. IEL is an investment company which aims at contributing to Israel's industrial sector by buying industrial companies and improving their management and business results. IEL has acquired and invested in Tadbik Group, Bikur Rofe, and Phoenicia Glass Works Ltd. These investments in total employ more than 800 workers.

Mandel invested in the hi-tech sector. His first such investment was in Medivent, the second hi-tech company in Israel. In 2011, Mandel was one of Pontifax's first investors, which focuses on investing in life science companies.

== Philanthropy ==
In 1953, the three Mandel brothers founded the Mandel Foundation, which supports many charitable causes. The foundation headquarters are located in Cleveland.

In the late 1970s Mandel started devoting more time toward philanthropy in the Cleveland area, serving as:

- Case Western Reserve University, Trustee
- Cleveland Museum of Art, Trustee
- Musical Arts Association (The Cleveland Orchestra), Trustee
- Cleveland Tomorrow, Co-Founder and Vice Chairman
- Jewish Community Center of Cleveland, President, 1952–1957
- Jewish Community Federation of Cleveland, President, 1974–1977
- United Way Services, Chairman of the Board, 1979–1981; President, 1977–1979
- City of Cleveland Project MOVE (formerly Mayor's Committee on Volunteerism), Founder, 1981
- Park Works (formerly Clean-Land, Ohio), Co-founder and Trustee, 1981–1997
- MidTown Cleveland, Co-Founder and Chairman, 1982–1985; Trustee, 1982
- Mandel Center for Nonprofit Organizations, CWRU, Co-Founder, 1984
- Mandel Center for Advanced Holocaust Studies, United States Holocaust Memorial Museum, 1998

In 1973, Mandel co-founded Cleveland's Ten Plus Club, which recruited business leaders who agreed to increase their contribution to $10,000. Mandel and his two brothers also donated more than $1 million to the human services campaign of Cleveland's United Way. In 1988, at a ceremony on the White House lawn, President Ronald Reagan awarded Premier Industrial Corporation the President Award for social initiatives in the private sector. That same year, the Mandel Foundation made a naming gift for what was then the School of Applied Social Sciences at Case Western Reserve University. In 2013, the school's social work program which had ranked 9th in the country at the time, was awarded an additional $8 million from the Mandel Foundation.

In 1988, the Mandel Foundation, the Cleveland Foundation, the George Gund Foundation, the Ford Foundation, and other local private, public, and philanthropic interests founded Cleveland Neighborhood Progress Inc. Mandel chaired this project.

In the early 1990s, Mandel became the financial supporter of the initiatives reflected in the Commission on Jewish Education in North America's 1990 report "A Time to Act," which called for strengthening the Jewish education profession and mobilizing community support for Jewish learning. In 1992, Mandel founded the Mandel Leadership Institute in Jerusalem, which trains potential social leaders in various programs, including its Educational Leadership School and the Israel Defense Forces Education Development Program. By 2014, the program had over 400 graduates. In 2002, following on "A Time to Act," Mandel founded the Jack, Joseph and Morton Mandel Center for Studies in Jewish Education at Brandeis University, a research center dedicated to improving Jewish education.

In 2004, the Mandel Center for Leadership in the Negev was established, which works closely with local authorities, non-profits, and social activists to develop local leadership in the region and improve the quality of life for Negev residents. The center also works to create better relationships between the region's Jewish and Bedouin communities. At the Ben-Gurion University of the Negev, the Mandel Foundation offers an MBA program in social leadership to foster a new group of Israeli leaders who combine a business approach with a commitment to social values.

In 2007, Mandel Foundation contributed $22.5 million to establish the Mandel Center for the Humanities at Brandeis University, which focuses on the fields of literature, language, and philosophy.

Since 2010, several institutions and buildings have been established by the Mandel Foundation, including the Mandel Building of the Jewish Federation of Cleveland; the Mandel Jewish Community Centers in Cleveland and in Palm Beach Gardens, and the Mandel School for Advanced Studies in the Humanities at the Hebrew University of Jerusalem, adjacent to the university's existing Mandel Institute of Jewish Studies.

In 2010, the Mandel Foundation donated $5 million to build the new Jewish Community Center at the Palm Beach Gardens and $12 million to the new Mandel Wing for Jewish Art and Life at the Israel Museum in Jerusalem.

In early 2012, the Mandel Foundation donated $5 million to public library of West Palm Beach. Later that year the foundation also gave an $18 million grant to build the new Mandel School for Advanced Studies in the Humanities at the Hebrew University of Jerusalem, as well as its annual $2.5 million contribution to support programs there.

In 2013, the Mandel Foundation contributed $25 million to build the new Jerusalem campus for the Bezalel Academy of Arts and Design, in addition to the support it gave to Bezalel's annual exhibition.

In June 2013, the Temple-Tifereth Israel received a matching commitment of $16 million from Mandel Foundation for a major expansion and renovation of its Beachwood campus in Ohio.

In November 2013, Mandel Foundation announced a $5 million endowment to establish the Be'er-Sheva Children's World Museum and a $1 million grant to the Cleveland Institute of Art for campus modernization and unification. The foundation awarded a $5.25 million gift to Brandeis University to fund a newly endowed faculty chair and to better the curriculum of the Mandel Center for Studies in Jewish Education.

In 2014, the Smithsonian's Cooper-Hewitt, National Design Museum in New York City received a $10 million gift from the Morton and Barbara Mandel Family Foundation.

In February 2014, the Mandel Foundation awarded a $13 million grant to establish a new building and new programs for the Mandel Institute for Social Leadership, which be housed on the campus of Ben-Gurion University.

In total, Mandel, his wife, and two brothers donated about $1 billion for charitable and cultural causes, of which one third went to Israeli institutions.

The Mandel Foundation has been responsible for publishing more than 30 books and monographs.

== Awards and recognition ==
- Presidential Award (by President Ronald Reagan) for Private Sector Initiatives
- George S. Dively Award for Corporate Leadership in Urban Development
- Carnegie Medal of Philanthropy
- Civic Leader of the Year, Cleveland, Ohio
- Charles Eisenman Award, Cleveland Jewish Community Federation
- Frank L. Weil Award, JCC Association
- Citizen of the Year, medal Cleveland Board of Realtors
- Honorary Fellow, Bezalel Academy of Arts & Design
- Business Statesman of the Year, Harvard Business School of Cleveland
- Best Management Performance Award, Case Western Reserve University, Weatherhead School of Management
- Business Executive of the Year, Sales & Marketing Executives of Cleveland
- Newton D. Baker Distinguished Alumni Award, Case Western Reserve University
- Businessman of the Year, Cleveland Urban League
- Outstanding Young Man of the Year, Cleveland Junior Chamber of Commerce

Mandel also received honorary doctorates from the following universities:

- Case Western Reserve University, Cleveland, OH
- Cleveland State University, Cleveland, OH
- Brandeis University, Waltham, MA
- Hebrew University of Jerusalem
- Ben Gurion University of the Negev, Israel
- Yeshiva University, New York, NY
- Hebrew Union College, Cincinnati, OH
- Gratz College, Philadelphia, PA
- Cleveland College of Jewish Studies, Cleveland, OH
- Hebrew College, Boston, MA

== Articles ==
- The Mandel Foundation Contributes $25 Million To The New Bezalel Campus
- Mandel earns degree 74 years after first enrolling
- Cooper-Hewitt Receives $10 Million From Morton and Barbara Mandel Family Foundation
- American Academy of Arts and Sciences Honors Morton Mandel
- Morton L. Mandel, Carnegie Medal of Philanthropy recipient and entrepreneur, dies at age 98
