= Julia I. Felsenthal =

American social worker

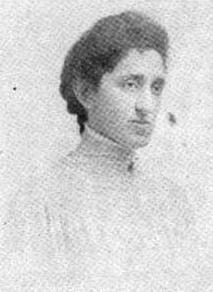
- Julia I. Felsenthal, from a 1911 publication.
- Born: October 4, 1867; Chicago
- Died: November 21, 1954 (aged 87); Chicago
- Occupation: Social worker

Julia I. Felsenthal (October 4, 1867 – November 21, 1954) was an American social worker based in Chicago. She was one of the founders of the National Council of Jewish Women.

== Early life ==
Felsenthal was born in Chicago, the daughter of rabbi Bernhard Felsenthal and Henrietta Blumenfeld Felsenthal. Both of her parents were born in Germany.

== Career ==
Felsenthal was a social worker and Jewish community leader, based in Chicago. In 1893 she served on the Jewish women's committee at the Columbian Exposition. She was one of the founders and leaders of the National Council of Jewish Women, president of the Chicago chapter of the Council of Jewish Women, and vice-president of the National Association of Jewish Social Workers. She was superintendent of the Sinai West Side Sabbath School, and taught correspondence courses through the Jewish Chautauqua Society.

Felsenthal worked one summer at Hull House with Jane Addams. Much of her social work involved the diverse needs of Jewish immigrants. In 1914, she was superintendent of the Jewish Welfare Society in Minneapolis. In 1930 Felsenthal endorsed the Griffin Bill, which would have allowed qualified applicants for naturalization to take the oath of United States citizenship without denying their religious or philosophical reservations about "the lawfulness of war as a means of settling international disputes."

== Personal life ==
Felsenthal remained active with Jewish women's organizations in Chicago until the last year of her life. She died in 1954, aged 87 years, in Chicago.
