= Cecilia Razovsky =

American social worker (1891–1968)

Cecila Davidson Razovsky (May 4, 1891 – September 27, 1968) was a Jewish American social worker and activist for immigrants in the US.

== Early life ==
Razovsky was born on May 4, 1891, to immigrant parents Jonas and Minna (Meyerson) Razovsky in St. Louis, Missouri. She worked several jobs in order to help support her family including sewing buttons on overalls in a factory at the age of 12 and working as salesgirl, waitress, laundress, stenographer, clerk, and secretary. At the age of 18 she began teaching immigrants at night at the Jewish Educational Alliance in St. Louis.

She was educated at Washington University in St. Louis (1911), the Corliss School of Law (1912), the St. Louis School of Economics (1913), and the Chicago School of Civics and Philanthropy (1919). Additionally, she attended graduate classes in sociology at the University of Chicago.

== Life and career ==
In 1911, she began working for the St. Louis Board of Education as an attendance officer. In 1917, she moved to Washington D.C. and became and become an inspector in the child labor division of the United States Children's Bureau. She worked there until 1920.

Razovsky become the Executive Secretary of the National Council of Jewish Women in 1921. She served as secretary for the immigrant aid department from 1920 to 1932, and became associate director in 1932. Razovsky represented the NCJW as a delegate to the First World Conference of Jewish Women in Vienna in 1932 where she spoke in immigration restrictions in the United States.

Razovsky also worked on immigration issues for a number of other organizations including the National Conference of Social Work from 1926 to 1929, Conference on Immigration Policy in 1928, executive director of the National Coordinating Committee for Aid to Refugees and Emigrants coming from Germany, and executive secretary of German-Jewish Children's Aid in 1934. Razovsky was also involved with many other organizations including the National Conference of Social Work (1926 to 1929), the Conference on Immigration Policy (1928) and the International Conference for Protection of Migrants in Geneva (1929).

In 1934, she organized the Coordinating Committee for Refugee Resettlement which would become the National Refugee Service in 1939. Between 1944 and 1948 she worked for the United Nations Relief and Rehabilitation Administration and the American Jewish Joint Distribution Committee.

As part of her efforts to study and assist Jewish refugees, Razovsky traveled extensively and established a social service program for refugees in Cuba.

She married Dr. Morris Davidson in 1927 and they had one son David L. Davidson. The family lived in Brazil, California and Texas. She died at the age of 77 on September 28, 1968, in San Diego.

== Works ==
- What every emigrant should know : a simple pamphlet for the guidance and benefit of prospective immigrants to the United States (1922)
- Handicaps in naturalization: a study of the effect of high fees upon the naturalization of aliens in the United States (1932)
- Making Americans (1938)
