= Fanny Fligelman Brin =

Interwar period peace activist(1984 - 1961)

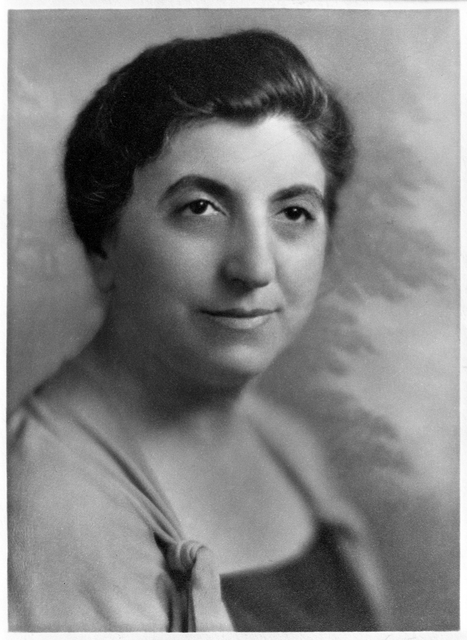
- Born: October 20, 1884; Berlad, Romania
- Died: September 4, 1961 (aged 76)
- Occupation: American Political Activist

Fanny Fligelman Brin (20 October 1884 – 4 September 1961) was an American political activist best known for her peace advocacy work in the interwar years.

Brin fought for women's rights and peace as a political realist and felt impelled to act at every political call for further violence. She became involved in politics as a suffragist while she was a student at the University of Minnesota from 1902 to 1906.

She influenced public opinion through her activism work in women's groups, including prominent leadership in the National Council of Jewish Women (NCJW) and active membership in the Women's International League for Peace and Freedom (WILPF) and the National Committee on the Cause and Cure of War (NCCCW). Her greatest impact was made through organizing large groups of women around the peace cause, exerting influence to push for peace work within the groups she was involved with, speaking to groups of women to educate about the importance of peace advocacy, and reaching women through her writing in NCJW's publication The Jewish Woman.

Brin's work across peace advocacy groups and recognizing her intersecting identities as a Jewish woman committed to peace allowed her to have a significant impact on the movement and to galvanize her community of Jewish women toward the pacifist cause.

== Biography ==
=== Early life and family ===
Brin was born in Berlad, Romania to John Fligelman and Antonette Friedman Fligelman. One of six siblings, her family immigrated to the United States when she was three months old in 1884. Due to family ties and a strong Romanian Jewish community, the Fligelman family found themselves in Minneapolis, Minnesota, where Brin grew up and spent the majority of her life. Brin grew up with stronger ties to the United States than to Romania; if she ever fell into speaking Yiddish, her father would tell her to “talk United States.”

Brin's parents had great influence on her interests and education growing up. Her father introduced her to politics at an early age, taking her to see Eugene Debs speak when she was just 10 years old. This likely contributed to her interest in politics and later drive to engage in political activism. Her mother was a strong proponent of her education, and Brin's critical thinking skills that she developed through her early learning and extracurricular involvement likely contributed to her deep understanding of international politics that she developed later in life. As a student at South High School in Minneapolis, she was active in her high school debate league, developing skills in communications and argumentation that would support her activism work in later years.

=== College life and early career ===
Brin attended the University of Minnesota for college and was a Phi Beta Kappa graduate in 1906. As a college student, Brin was involved in oratory and debate and had a strong academic record. She was the first woman to win a prize in the Pillsbury oratorical contest on a speech entitled “Russian Bureaucracy and the Jews.” Her involvements taught her invaluable public speaking skills that set her up for success in later activism work, and her accomplishments likely empowered her to take on future leadership roles. Her speech topics focused on international politics, showing her early interest in a topic that she later dedicated her activism toward.

After graduating from college, Brin taught English for several years. Teaching likely furthered her public speaking and relational abilities that proved crucial to her later success in political advocacy. She also joined Peripatetics, an elite women's study club for Jewish college graduates in Minneapolis. Joining this group gave Brin an opportunity to begin building her community of other Jewish educated women in Minneapolis, a group she would later be intimately involved with through her activism work.

=== Marriage and family ===
Fanny Fligelman Brin married Arthur Brin, the president and treasurer of Brin Glass Company, in 1913. Together they had three children, Rachel, Howard, and Charles. Arthur Brin made a high income which allowed Fanny Brin financial stability and ample leisure time. The Brins were able to afford to hire domestic help to take care of the children and cook and clean in the home. Because of her socioeconomic status that her marriage afforded her, Brin was able to dedicate herself to activism full-time. Most women involved in social movements at the time of Brin's life came from strong financial means because activism required a large time commitment. The level of Brin's involvement would not have been possible without the resources she had access to. Although her leadership in advocacy is important, it does call into question who had access to the ability to be an activist and whose voices were stifled in social movements due to this need for time and resources to be able to fully participate. Rabbi Deborah Brin, Brin's granddaughter, gave a speech at the Minnesota State Capitol Rotunda on September 8, 2019, which was the official 100th anniversary of women getting the right to vote in the state. She spoke in honor of Fanny Fligelman Brin.

== Political actions and beliefs ==
=== Interwar period peace activism ===
After the bloodshed of World War I, peace advocacy groups came to prominence worldwide. Peace advocacy spanned political affiliations and caught the attention of a diverse group of activists interested in building a better future globally. Women in the United States saw the peace movement as a natural next step after gaining the right to vote, and women broadly saw the plight of nonviolence as a uniquely feminist cause rooted in feminine values of the time, including human dignity and preserving life. Peace efforts in legislation, like the Kellogg-Briand Pact that rejected armed force as a use of conflict resolution, were created by men and with the priorities and assumptions of men in mind. Therefore, women felt called to work on peace advocacy to bring their voices into a movement they felt reflected their priorities. However, women's activism in the peace movement was not necessarily always accepted. Activism was considered by some to be “unpatriotic” and “unmotherly” because it detracted from the women's duty to care for their children. Women who participated in the peace movement defied expectations to advocate for their beliefs. In this context, Brin spent much of her time and energy in her peace advocacy efforts focused on the ratification of the Kellogg-Briand Pact. While NCJW was at first timid to support the Kellogg-Briand Pact, Brin called strongly on the group to make it a priority, and they did eventually join other women's groups in its support in 1928. Through NCJW, Brin effectively organized 1200 women in Minnesota alone to support the Pact and 700 participants to participate in a conference to mobilize around this piece of legislation. Brin and other women peace activists often invoked the Pact to frame the entirety of their peace advocacy as centering around this objective, thus making it their own. Thanks to these efforts throughout the peace movement, Kellogg-Briand Pact was ratified in 1929.

In addition to her advocacy for the Kellogg-Briand Pact, Brin dedicated herself to fighting against compulsory military training in the interwar years. Brin argued strongly that bringing military training into schools would create a more militaristic mindset in the United States. In an opinion column in NCJW's The Jewish Woman, Brin wrote, “Are we not, by allowing the Military Department to put military training in our civil education institutions, introducing in this country a feature more militaristic than that which any country ever essayed?” Although Brin took a strong stance on compulsory military training, NCJW kept its distance from this advocacy, focusing on more moderate efforts. Brin often pushed the organization to take more radical stances. By the 1930s, Brin began to focus her advocacy efforts on creating a new international institution that could prevent conflict and end war. This characterized much of her activism moving forward.

=== World War II activism ===
As World War II commenced, Brin began to revise her long-standing radical pacifist views, specifically around the opposition to a large American defense program. The world saw a collapse of France and the potential of a German victory. Brin could no longer reconcile her work to push NCJW toward advocacy for “’…demobilizing armaments.’” When Japanese forces attacked Pearl Harbor, Brin responded by reaffirming her commitment to international collective security and a resolve for peace after the war. She declared, “‘We must never forget the lessons we have learned, that isolation does not protect us, that it breaks down when we need it most; that when it breaks down, it ends in intervention; that we can only avoid intervention by setting up agencies which make possible collective action. We must learn and teach the lesson of cooperation and search for the form it must take.’” Brin refocused her advocacy in this moment on the need for international cooperation as a collective security measure. Throughout World War II, she advocated for global institutions to collaborate for conflict resolution. She articulated, “‘War is global, peace is global, and prosperity is global.’” In addition to her advocacy work, Brin devoted time to supporting Jewish refugees displaced due to the Holocaust. As a Jew who had immigrated to the United States at a young age herself, she likely felt a strong connection to this cause. Brin ran a Minneapolis coordinating committee for refugee aid and headed the state refugee committee. In 1943, Brin advocated for American participation in an international conflict resolution organization, what would eventually become the United Nations. This put Brin on a path toward further UN advocacy.

=== Post-World War II activism ===
Immediately following World War II, Brin dedicated herself fully to ensuring the establishment and support of the United Nations. In 1945, she served as an alternate for the Women's Action Committee for Lasting Peace at the founding conference of the UN, where 51 countries came together to create this new international collaboration. This conference was an important moment in Brin's life, as it symbolized to her the potential for an improved future. Brin also created and held frequent meetings for a UN rally in Minnesota, garnering a large amount of support from Jewish women. This was likely due to the strong base of women activists Brin had built up in Minnesota over time. Brin never abandoned her ideals of peace but simply shifted her focus toward international collaborations like the UN. She solidified her passion for the power of international institutions in achieving lasting peace globally.

=== Women's rights ===
In addition to her peace advocacy, Brin held strong convictions for women's rights. In the 1910s, she was active in the women's suffrage movement, although she did not play a leading role. Brin traced her interest in women's rights to her time at the University of Minnesota, where she found women activist role models in her professors. Having these role models likely empowered Brin to take on activism after she graduated from college. Throughout her life, Brin advocated for women's empowerment. She frequently spoke on the importance of women's contributions to society and equality for all women. She declared, “’we seem to be moving very slowly, I have faith that women will some day make a great contribution to civilization. The need for women’s participation grows daily…I believe they can do more than they realize…women working side by side with men can push forward a better world.’” Brin found the intersection of her interests in women’s rights, her Jewish identity, and peace through NCJW. However, as an early advocate for world peace, Brin had to push against people within NCJW who did not always agree on her strong stance on the issue. This allowed Brin the opportunity to bring peace advocacy to prominence within this organization that she so strongly identified with, and she saw success as NCJW became increasingly committed to the pacifist cause. Brin believed women had an important role to play in peace advocacy. In a column for The Jewish Woman, she wrote, “It has been repeatedly stated that the women of the world have an unusual responsibility in the peace movement. The women of the United States so banded together in this great cause can render a signal service to the human race.” Because Brin believed so strongly in the power of women's leadership, she saw their involvement in peace efforts as a signal to all people of the importance of the movement.

=== Jewish heritage ===
Brin felt a strong connection to her Jewish heritage and frequently incorporated Jewish content into her activism work to add to her case for peace among the Jewish women in NCJW. For example, in a speech explaining the Jewish women's role, she stated, “‘One can say of the entrance of women into public life at this time of social change as did Mordecai of Esther when she was taken into the household of the King, ‘Who knows but that you have come into power for such an hour as this?’’” Invoking a strong Jewish female role model in Jewish history, Brin was able to bring Jewish women along in seeing advocacy as a Jewish value. Brin's intersecting identity as both Jewish and a woman allowed her to utilize the case of Esther among a group of Jewish women to encourage action. In addition to advocating within her own community, Brin saw power in a multi-faith peace movement where all women could fully participate. She saw it as her role bring Jewish women along in this effort. As an active member of both NCJW and WILPF, she encouraged the two women's groups, one uniquely Jewish and one consisting of women from all faiths, to align themselves to strengthen the whole peace movement. Brin viewed her activism as an example that other American Jewish women could follow as someone involved in both Jewish and non-Jewish women's pacifist groups. She felt strongly in the unique role Jewish women had to play in the peace movement, as she saw Jewish women specifically as a group who had suffered the most at times of war.

== Organizational affiliations ==
=== National Council of Jewish Women (NCJW) ===
Brin dedicated a large amount of time and energy towards her work with NCJW and the leadership positions she eventually took on with the organization. Some of her most prominent work in the peace movement and her greatest influences came from her efforts with NCJW. She began her involvement with NCJW's Minneapolis section in the 1910s. In 1924, she began a leadership position as the National Chair of the Committee on Peace and Arbitration. In this role, she kept up and reported on current events related to war and peace for NCJW membership, participated in study groups and meetings on the topic, wrote articles for NCJW publications, and traveled to various NCJW sections to advocate for involvement in the peace movement. By 1930, peace work was the most prominent area of advocacy among NCJW sections than any other justice issue; this is a testament to Brin's efforts to encourage NCJW members to get involved in the pacifist cause. Brin became the ninth National President of NCJW in 1932 and served in this role for two terms until 1938. After six years in this role, she stepped back into her position as the National Chair of the newly renamed Committee on International Relations and Peace. Even while National President, Brin remained committed to advocating for NCJW members to take up the pacifist cause. Brin's greatest contribution to NCJW was pushing the organization to take stronger stances on world peace and strengthening the organization's voice as a leader in the women's peace movement.

=== National Committee on the Cause and Cure of War (NCCCW) ===
In 1924, Carrie Chapman Catt, the former suffragist activist, founded NCCCW as a women's coalition group committed to international peace and disarmament efforts. Brin was an active founding member of the group. Brin and Catt shared a strong relationship that created deep ties between NCCCW and NCJW. The two feminist activists supported each other's work in the public sphere. For example, Catt frequently referred to the “models of intelligent activism” that NCJW worked on, and she saw Brin as an influential and competent peace advocate. In a column for The Jewish Woman that reached the membership of NCJW, Brin wrote, “The chairman further recommends Mrs. Catt’s pamphlet entitled ‘Arbitration the Only Substitute for War.’ This pamphlet presents one hundred fifty questions and answers on the important subject of arbitration in a clear and readable form. Everyone interested in peace will find it invaluable.” By supporting each other, Brin and Catt ultimately strengthened the women’s peace movement and showed the power of collaboration in overlapping work.

=== Women's International League for Peace and Freedom (WILPF) ===
In 1922, WILPF was founded as a progressive women’s group committed to efforts for global peace. Throughout the 1920s and 1930s, Brin participated actively in WILPF’s Minnesota chapter. One contribution she made to the group was her work on a committee that led a Minnesota “Law-Not War” demonstration. Other women's peace advocacy groups saw WILPF as a more radical pacifist group, and Brin found herself pushing NCJW to cooperate with WILPF efforts despite hesitancy from NCJW's leadership. Brin's consistent push for NCJW to partner with other women's peace groups like WILPF ultimately advanced Jewish women's understanding of the needed peace efforts of the time and strengthened the peace movement as a whole.

=== Other involvement ===
In addition to her active membership in NCJW, NCCCW, and WILPF, Brin was a member of the Woman's Club of Minneapolis, the League of Women Voters, Hadassah, the College Women's Club, the American Association of University Women, and the National Conference of Christians and Jews. In 1933, she was appointed by Eleanor Roosevelt to serve on the Women's Committee to Aid Social Service work, an effort to respond to people's needs in the Depression era. Brin's many involvements were a testament to her dedication to building community and supporting causes she felt strongly toward.

== Publications ==
=== The Jewish Woman ===
Brin was a prolific writer, and her thought-leadership on the peace movement can mainly be found through her peace columns in NCJW's quarterly magazine entitled The Jewish Woman. Published from 1921 to 1931 during the interwar period, the magazine was written by and for an American Jewish female audience. The Jewish Woman reflected the feminist views of NCJW's leadership. The goal of the magazine was to serve as “’a platform that would unite all Jewish women in the interests that they share in common.’” The magazine reached NCJW membership and had an explicit goal of expanding membership as well. Therefore, it likely reached Jewish women outside of NCJW membership who expressed interest in NCJW causes. Brin’s peace columns outlined how NCJW sections should carry out peace efforts and called on Jewish women to take a strong stance in the peace movement. She advocated for international peace legislation and urged readers to educate themselves on the issue. In a 1926 column, Brin wrote, “Only by the most earnest and tireless work can we finally free mankind from this greatest of all curses, the tyranny of war.” Brin's strong language calling for the importance of peace work likely galvanized Jewish women to take action for peace and pushed the movement forward within the organization.

== Honors and awards ==
- In 1932, Brin was named by The American Hebrew as one of 38 women making an outstanding contribution to Jewish life.
- In 1934, Brin was named one of 10 outstanding women of the year by Carrie Chapman Catt of NCCCW.
- In 1956, the Minneapolis American Association of University Women honored Brin for her civic work through NCJW and her United Nations advocacy.

== Legacy ==
Brin's dedication to the women's peace movement had a profound impact on what women's groups were able to accomplish in the early to mid-1900s. Because of her involvement in so many different women's peace organizations, she bridged the divide across groups, encouraging collaboration and strengthening the movement. Her identity as a Jewish woman allowed her to galvanize her Jewish community and incorporate a Jewish perspective in the movement.
