= Americanization (immigration) =

Process by which immigrants share American culture

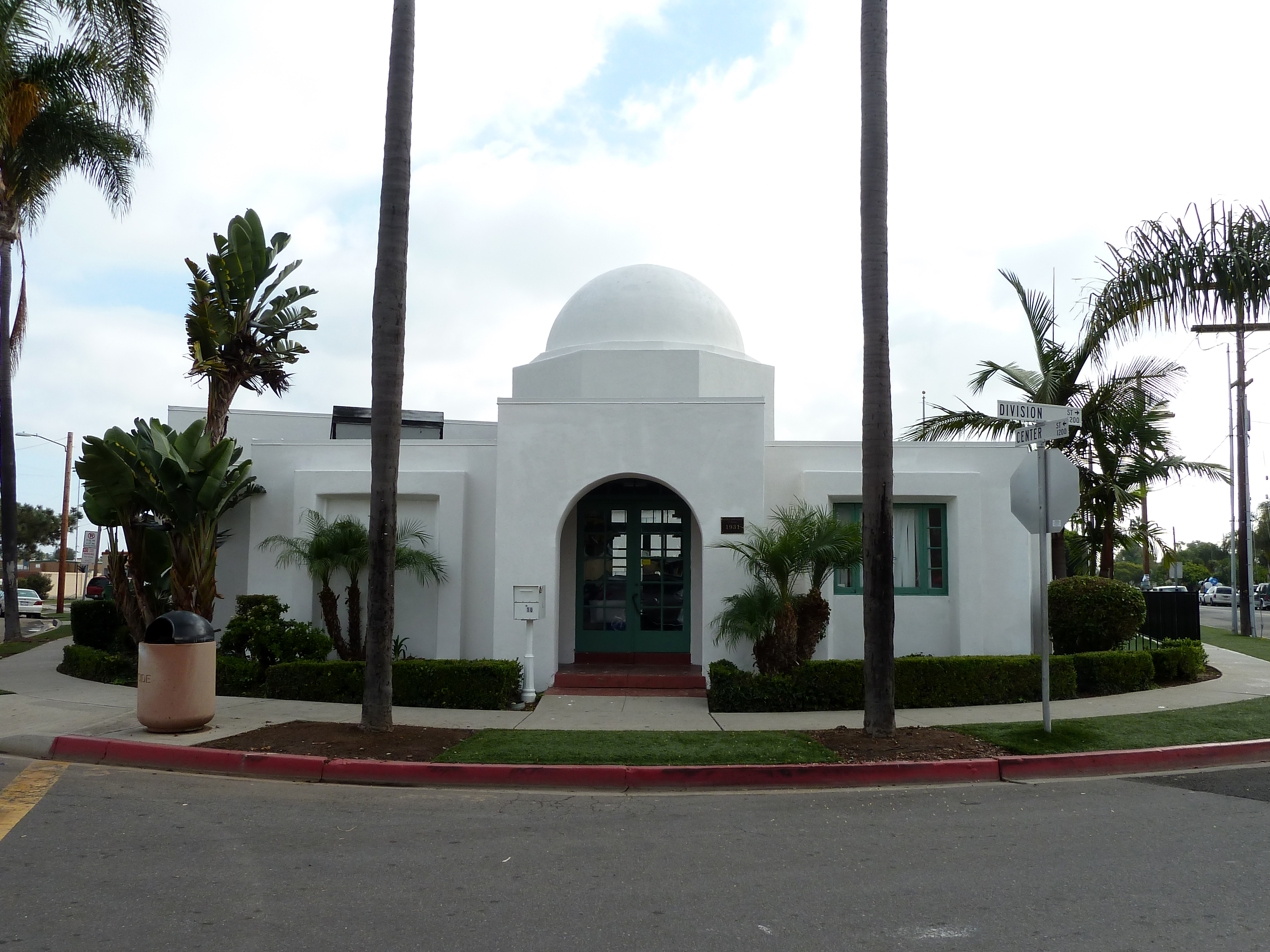
The Americanization School, built in Oceanside, California in 1931, is an example of a school built to help Spanish-speaking immigrants learn English and civics.

Americanization is the process of an immigrant to the United States becoming a person who shares American culture, values, beliefs, and customs by assimilating into the American nation. This process typically involves learning the American English language and adjusting to American culture, values, and customs. It can be considered another form of, or an American subset of Anglicization.

The Americanization movement was a nationwide organized effort in the 1910s to bring millions of recent immigrants into the American cultural system. 30+ states passed laws requiring Americanization programs; in hundreds of cities the chamber of commerce organized classes in English language and American civics; many factories cooperated. Over 3000 school boards, especially in the Northeast and Midwest, operated after-school and Saturday classes. Labor unions, especially the coal miners, (United Mine Workers of America) helped their members take out citizenship papers. In the cities, the YMCA and YWCA were especially active, as were the organization of descendants of the founding generation such as the Daughters of the American Revolution. The movement climaxed during World War I, as eligible young immigrant men were drafted into the Army, and the nation made every effort to integrate the European ethnic groups into the national identity.

As a form of cultural assimilation, the movement stands in contrast to later ideas of multiculturalism. Americanization efforts during this time period went beyond education and English learning, into active and sometimes coercive suppression of "foreign" cultural elements. The movement has been criticized as xenophobic and prejudiced against Southern Europeans, though anti-German sentiment also became widespread during World War I, as the United States and German Empire were part of opposing military alliances.

== Background ==
The initial stages of immigrant Americanization began in the 1830s. Prior to 1820, foreign immigration to the United States was predominantly from the British Isles. There were other ethnic groups present, such as the French, Swedes and Germans in colonial times, but comparably, these ethnic groups were a minuscule fraction of the whole. Soon after 1820, for the first time, there began a substantial Irish and German migration to the United States. Up until 1885, immigrants were overwhelmingly Northwestern European (90% in that year) which brought a similar culture to that already existing in the U.S. maintaining stability within their bubble of natives and newcomers. By 1905, a major shift had occurred, and three-fourths of these newcomers were born in Southern and Eastern Europe. Their religion was mainly Roman Catholic, Greek Catholic and Jewish; Americanization became more difficult because of the notable contrasts of customs, habits, and ideals to those of Northern and Western European immigrants.

According to the United States Census Bureau, in 1910, there were about 13,000,000 foreign-born and 33,000,000 residents of a foreign origin living in the United States. About 3,000,000 of the foreign-born over ten years of age were unable to speak English and about 1,650,000 were unable to read or write in any language. Close to half of the foreign-born populace were males of voting age; but only 4 out of every 1,000 of them were being educated to learn English and about American citizenship. In total, about five million people in the United States were unable to speak English, and of those two million were illiterate. World War I (which started in 1914) and the years immediately following represented a turning point in the Americanization process. In 1910, 34% of foreign males of draft age were unable to speak English; about half a million of the registered alien male draftees were unable to understand military orders given in English. At the same time, more immigrants displaced by the war began arriving.

A number of Americans feared the growing presence of immigrants in the country posed a sufficient threat to the political order. Americans' awareness of and attitudes towards immigrants and their foreign relations changed dramatically with America's increasing role in the world. As Americans' views towards immigrants were growing more negative, fearful, and xenophobic, the United States resorted to programs of forced Americanization, as well as the immigration restriction acts of the 1920s, including the Immigration Act of 1924, primarily focused on restricting immigration from Southern and Southeastern Europe, in addition, to heavily restrict immigration of Africans, and a complete ban on immigration of Arabs and Asians. At the same time, a new positive outlook of a pluralist society began to progress, as seen in the discussion around Israel Zangwill's 1909 play The Melting Pot.

== History ==
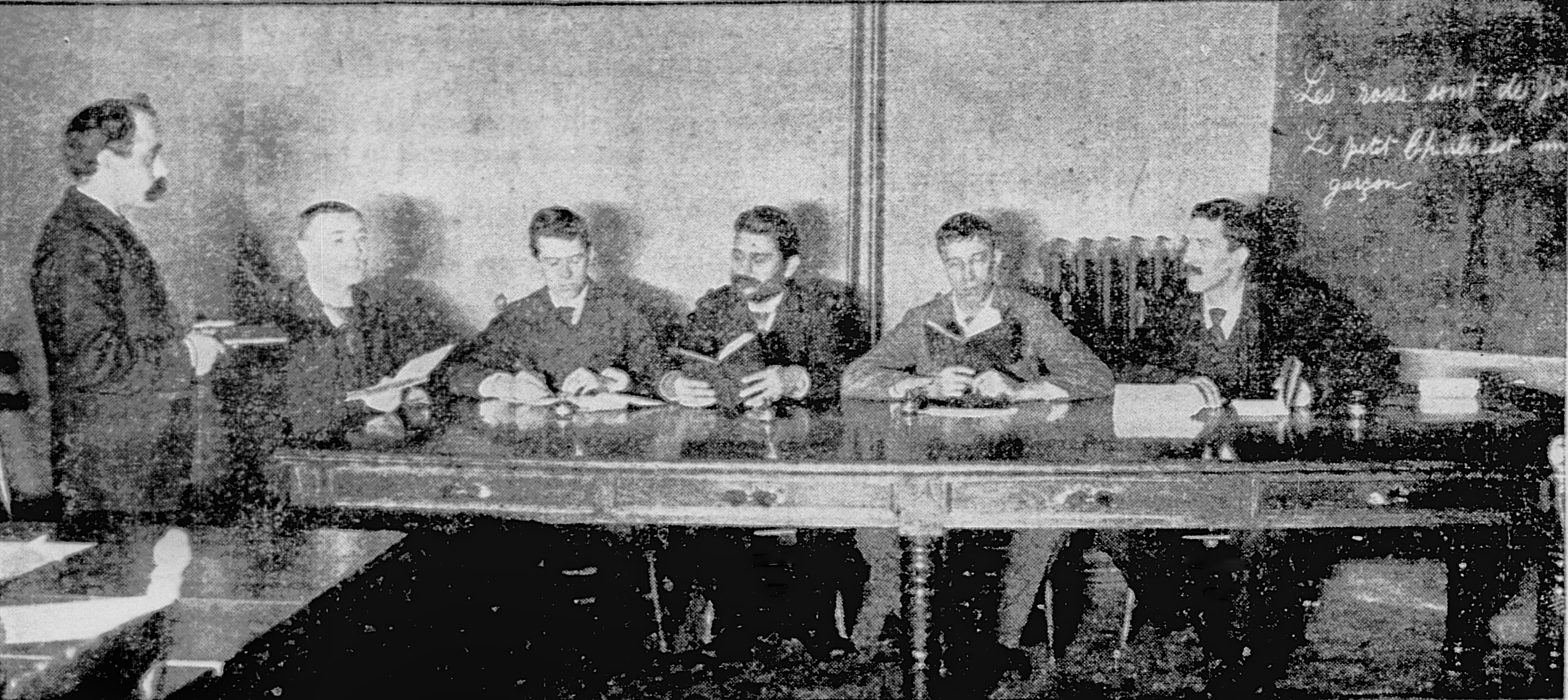
A photo from a 1902 New York Tribune article on Americanization, of Holyoke Frenchmen taking English classes at a YMCA night school

The term "Americanization" was brought into general use during the organization of "Americanization Day" celebrations in a number of cities for July 4, 1915. Interest in the process of assimilation had been increasing for many years before such programs were designated "Americanization." The publication of a report of the United States Immigration Commission in 1911 marked the culmination of an attempt to formulate a constructive national policy toward immigration and naturalization and was the basis of many of the programs adopted afterwards.

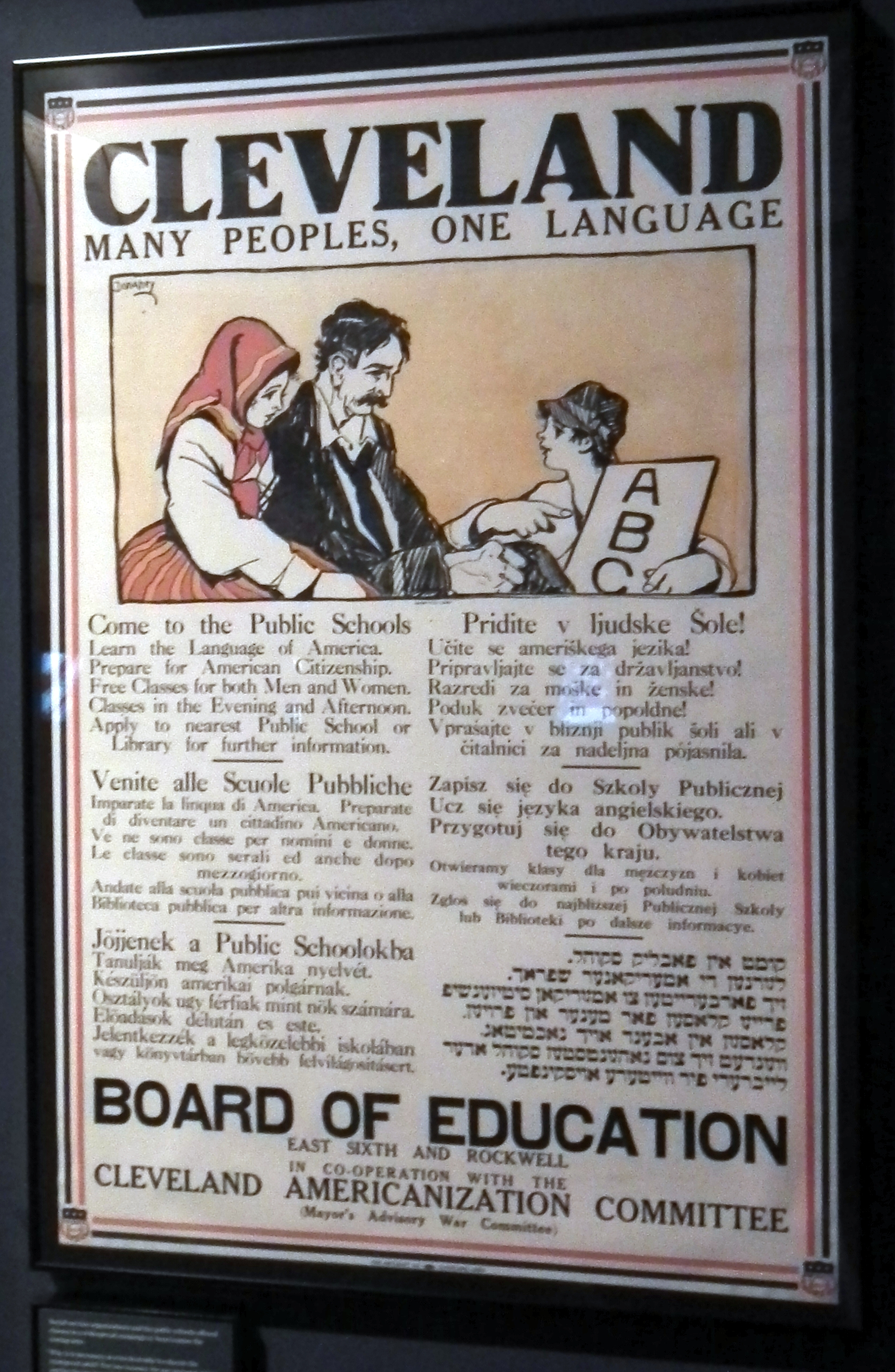
Poster advertising free English classes and help for naturalization for speakers of Italian, Hungarian, Slovenian, Polish and Yiddish, Cleveland Americanization Committee, 1917: Many peoples, one language.

The National Americanization Committee was established in May, 1915, with aid from the Committee for Immigration in America in the pursuit to bring all American citizens together as one to celebrate common rights as Americans, wherever born. The committee was so effective that it turned into a powerful organization, dealing with many aspects of American society, such as governmental departments, schools, courts, churches, women's clubs, institutions, and groups as units of co-operation. This committee was responsible for the standardization of Americanization work and methods, stimulating immigrant thought, interest and activity. Their many experiments were later incorporated into governmental, educational, and business systems of the country. Its services and publications were free.

During the period of mass immigration, the main target group of Americanization projects included Jews and Catholics and from southern and southeastern Europe. Churches, unions, and charities attempted to Americanize the new immigrants both formally through structured programs and informally at work through the environment created by management. Americanization also suggests a broader process that includes the everyday struggle of immigrants to understand their new environment and how they invent ways to cope with it.

"During the late nineteenth Century, skilled Germans, British, Irish and native-born male workers built strong craft unions and settle into comfortable communities. Through their craft unions, churches, fraternal organizations, and other institutions, they created their own cultural worlds, ones that often left little room for newcomers."

Private agencies also gave high priority to Americanization projects. The Ford Motor Company had an especially well-publicized program. Among the religious groups carrying on systematic programs of work among immigrants were most of the larger Protestant denominations, the National Catholic War Council, the Y.M.C.A., the Y.W.C.A., the Knights of Columbus, and the Y.M.H.A. Extensive campaigns were also conducted by old stock patriotic organizations such as the National Security League, the Sons and Daughters of the American Revolution, and the Colonial Dames of America. The National Chamber of Commerce and hundreds of city chambers also did systematic work. Public libraries also embraced Americanization as a patriotic duty during and after World War I. The National Federation of Women's Clubs and the National Council of Jewish Women also adopted definite and comprehensive programs of work. The organizations assisted newcomers with naturalization papers, helped reunite families, provided interpreters, warned about fraudulent offers, provided access to lawyers, and provided information about employment.

In the aftermath the target populations learned English and adopted American life styles in speech, clothing and recreation. They clung to their historic religions. They not only retained their traditional cuisines, but they also introduced the wider American public to the taste for pizza, bagels and tacos. Historian Vincent Cannato adds: "From sports and food to movies and music, they haven't just contributed to the culture, they have helped redefine it."

Social workers generally supported the Americanization movement, but not all of them. Edith Terry Bremer strongly opposed Americanization programs before the war and wrote that Americanization stimulated fear and hate. She then served as a special agent for the United States Immigration Commission Bremer was concerned that the existing public and private agencies serving immigrants largely ignored women so she made her most important contribution by establishing the first International Institute in New York City as a YMCA experiment in December, 1910.

=== World War I ===
Interest in the foreign born in the United States was quickened by the outbreak of World War I in 1914. Although the United States remained neutral until April 1917, the war in Europe cast attention on the many recent immigrants in the United States. Of special concern was the issue of their political loyalty, whether to the United States or to their mother country, and the long-term tension regarding assimilation into American society.

Numerous agencies became active, such as the Councils of National Defense, the United States Department of the Interior, the Food Administration and other federal agencies charged with the task of uniting the people of the United States in support of the war aims of the government. The National Americanization Committee (NAC) was by far the most important private organization in the movement. It was directed by Frances Kellor. Second in importance was the Committee for Immigrants in America, which helped fund the Division of Immigrant Education in the federal Bureau of Education. While John Foster Carr, a publisher and propagandist for Americanization, was convinced that the American public library was the most effective Americanization force. He joined the American Library Association in 1913, with the hope that American libraries would use his publications in their Americanization work with immigrants. A year later he founded the Immigrant Publication Society of New York, which published his guidebooks for immigrants as well as handbooks and pamphlets on Americanization topics for librarians and social workers.

Frederic C. Howe, Commissioner at Ellis Island, asked mayors nationwide to make July 4, 1915, Americanization night in their communities.

=== Impact of war ===
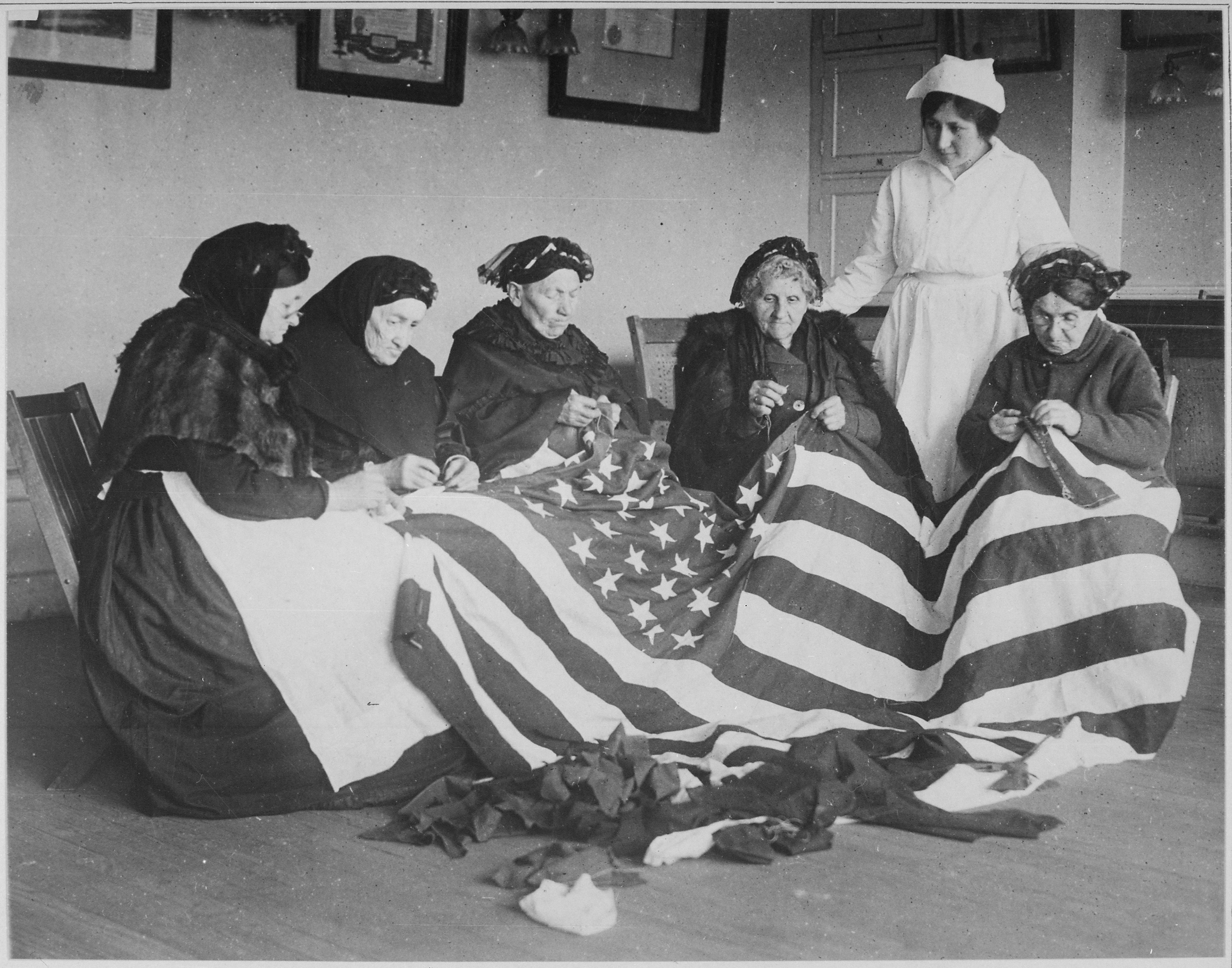
"Patriotic old women making flags", ca. 1918. They were all born abroad: in Hungary, Galicia, Russia, Germany and Romania.

Millions of recently arrived immigrants who had originally intended to return to the mother country were unable to return to Europe because of the war from 1914 to 1919. The great majority decided to stay permanently in America, and foreign language use declined dramatically as they switched to English. Instead of resisting Americanization they welcomed it, often signing up for English classes and using their savings to buy homes and bring over other family members.

Kellor, speaking for the NAC in 1916, proposed to combine efficiency and patriotism in her Americanization programs. It would be more efficient, she argued, once the factory workers could all understand English and therefore better understand orders and avoid accidents. Once Americanized, they would grasp American industrial ideals and be open to American influences and not subject only to strike agitators or foreign propagandists. The result, she argued, would transform indifferent and ignorant residents into understanding voters, to make their homes into American homes, and to establish American standards of living throughout the ethnic communities. Ultimately she argued it would, "unite foreign-born and native alike in enthusiastic loyalty to our national ideals of liberty and justice."

=== 1920s ===
All Americans (1929), a short musical film promoting European assimilation through the cultural melting pot

After World War I, the emphasis on Americanization programs was gradually shifted from emergency propaganda to a long-time educational program, when a study of conditions in the draft army made by the United States Surgeon General's office showed that 18% to 42% of the men in army camps were unable to read a newspaper or to write a letter home, and that in the Northeastern, Midwestern, and Western United States, these illiterates were almost entirely foreign born. Indications were that barriers to any understanding of U.S. aims and interests were even more marked than this among the older men and the women in the foreign colonies of the U.S. Hundreds of Americanization agencies sprang up overnight.

=== Late 20th century ===
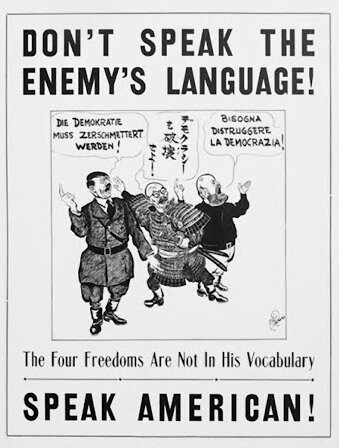
WW2-era poster: Don't speak the Enemy's language! (German, Japanese, Italian) The Four Freedoms are not in his vocabulary. Speak American! Hitler, Tojo and Mussolini are saying "Democracy must be destroyed!" in their languages.

After the 1970s, proponents of multiculturalism began attacking Americanization programs as coercive and not respectful of immigrant culture. A major debate today is on whether speaking English is an essential component of being American.

== Immigrant groups ==
=== Cajuns ===
The French-speaking Cajuns of southern Louisiana were not immigrants—they arrived before the American Revolution in an isolated area that allowed little contact with other groups. The Cajuns were forcefully Anglicized in the 20th century. Children were punished in school for using French; they were called names like "swamp rat" and "bougalie", forced to write lines ("I will not speak French in school"), made to kneel on kernels of corn, and slapped with rulers. French was also banned as a medium of education by the State of Louisiana in 1912. English also gained more prestige than Cajun French due to the spread of English-language movies, newspapers and radio into Acadiana. Wartime military service broke the crust of traditionalism for younger men, while automobiles and the highway system allowed easy movement to Anglo cities. Prosperity and consumer culture, and a host of other influences have effaced much of the linguistic and cultural uniqueness of the Cajuns.

=== Dutch ===
Leonard Dinnerstein and David M. Reimers showed that immigrants who arrived during the 19th century in large numbers from western and northern Europe had mostly been assimilated. They call this process the loss of "Old World culture" including increasing rates of intermarriage outside the native ethnic group and not using native languages in daily life, church, school, or media. This process continues across generations and these immigrant groups have become more assimilated into the mainstream American culture over time.

=== Irish ===
The Irish were the most influential ethnic group regarding the initial waves of immigration to the United States and of Americanization. Newly arrived immigrants in American cities had a hard time avoiding the Irish. There was no way around the Irish for the newcomers, as the Irish were present in every aspect of American working-class society. Between 1840 and 1890, more than 3,000,000 Irish immigrants had entered the United States, and by 1900, about 5,000,000 of their first and second generations were settled in. There were more Irish living in the United States than in Ireland. Irish Americans played a major role in the newcomer's Americanization. In other words, identity in the United States emerged from dynamic relationships among ethnic groups, as well as from particular groups' own distinct history and traditions.

The newer ethnic groups were not directly assimilated to the American cultural mainstream, but rather, there was a gradual process of acculturation, where newcomer immigrants acculturated to a new way of life, learning new skills and habits through their unique experiences. This form of Americanization was a process carried out partially through force and coercion, that occurred in settlement houses, night school classes, and corporate programs, where these working-class immigrants were pressed to learn WASP values. "A key to understanding the multi-ethnic American city is that most immigrants came to understand their new world less through such formal programs, than through informal contacts with the Irish and other experienced working-class Americans of diverse ethnic backgrounds in the streets, churches, and theaters." Historian James Barrett states, "Inside the labor movement, the Catholic Church, and the political organizations of many working-class communities, the Irish occupied vital positions as Americanizers of later groups."

By the late nineteenth century, racism was genuinely rooted in the world views of many workers and was passed on to newcomer immigrants, expediting the process of class unity.

=== Jews ===
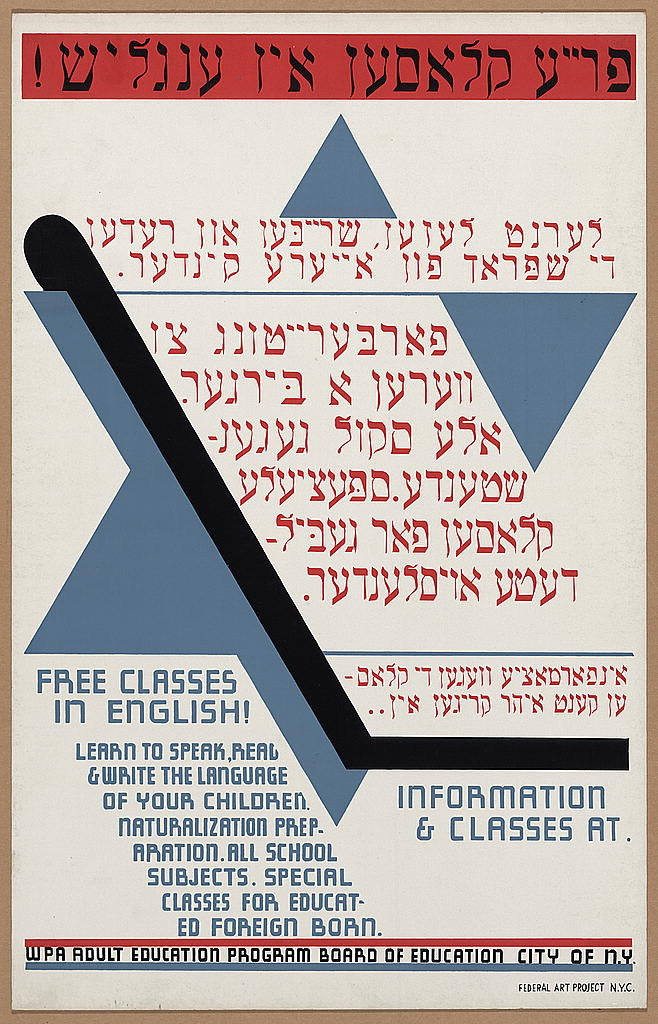
Poster by the City of New York advertising free English classes for Yiddish speakers, 1930s: Learn to speak, read and write the language of your children.

Jacob Schiff played a major role as a leader of the American Jewish community in the late 19th century. At a time of increasing demand for immigration restriction, Schiff supported and worked for Jewish Americanization. A Reform Jew, he backed the creation of the Conservative Jewish Theological Seminary of America. He took a stand favoring a modified form of Zionism, reversing his earlier opposition. Above all, Schiff believed that American Jewry could live in both the Jewish and American worlds, creating a balance that made possible an enduring American Jewish community.

The National Council of Jewish Women (NCJW), founded in Chicago in 1893, had the goals of philanthropy and the Americanization of Jewish immigrants. Responding to the plight of Jewish women and girls from Eastern Europe, the NCJW created its Department of Immigrant Aid to assist and protect female immigrants from the time of their arrival at Ellis Island until their settlement at their final destination. The NCJW's Americanization program included assisting immigrants with housing, health, and employment problems, leading them to organizations where women could begin to socialize, and conducting English classes while helping them maintain a strong Jewish identity. The council, pluralistic rather than conformist, continued its Americanization efforts and fought against restrictive immigration laws after World War I. At the forefront of its activities was the religious education of Jewish girls, who were ignored by the Orthodox community. Americanization did not mean giving up traditional ethnic foods.

=== Italians ===
World War I closed off most new arrivals and departures from Italy. The Italian American community supported the American war effort, sending tens of thousands of young men into the armed forces, as others took jobs in war factories. Buying war bonds became patriotic, and use of English surged as the community supported the Americanization campaigns. By the 1920s the Little Italies had stabilized and grew richer, as workers gained skills and entrepreneurs opened restaurants, groceries, construction firms and other small businesses. With few new arrivals, there was less Italian and more English spoken, especially by the younger generation.

=== Mexicans ===
Ethnic Mexicans are one of the largest groups of people in the United States of America. Early on, many Mexican migrants and Mexican-Americans were actively trying to become a part of Anglo-American society. From the 1910s and onward there has been a big focus put onto the youth in California. There were, and still are, stereotypes of the youth ranging from "illegal aliens" to "criminals." Mexican-Americans who were interested in assimilating or being accepted into white American society. In an attempt to combat negative stereotypes associated with Mexicans in the United States, some Mexicans chose to embrace Mexican American identity promoted by the nativists in California.

In Merton E. Hill's "The Development of an Americanization Program," Hill states that "the public must be aroused to a realization of the great and immediate need of making provision for educational, vocational, and sanitation programs that will result in...promoting the use of the English language, the right American customs, and the best possible standards of American life." The goal was to integrate Ethnic Mexican youth into American society so they would become truly American in the public's view. This Americanization took over the people's Mexican culture and made labeled "outwardly Mexican" culture as un-American.

The Americanization efforts were also passed on through the home. From the point of view of Anglo-Americans, the best way to change the youth was through the help of mothers. Mothers were one of the preferred vessels of the Americanization of Mexicans because they were the ones that spent more time in the home and they could pass on their learned American values to the youth. In order to Americanize the mothers, they were taught through the help of the Home Teacher Act of 1915. With this act, teachers were allowed to enter the homes of Mexicans in California and teach the women how to be American and to pass on values to their children.

Other than the mothers, another effort that was made to Americanize the youth was to Americanize young Mexican girls. Young girls were starting to be taught in schools about different American values and customs through activities such as sewing, budgeting, and motherhood. The same idea for educating young girls was the reason that they were educating mothers, the girls would grow up to be mothers and have an influence on the lives of Mexican Americans in and outside the household.

Education was the main focus of the Americanization efforts. Soon, it became engraved in the minds of Mexican-Americans that the best way to become a part of American society was through leaving their own Mexican culture behind. Throughout the southwest, new organizations were being created to fully integrate Mexican-Americans into society. One example is the League of United Latin American Citizens (LULAC), which was founded in 1929 and only allowed United States Citizens to join. Found in a LULAC pamphlet is the phrase "We believe that education is the foundation for the cultural grown and development of this nation and that we are obligated to protect and promote the education of our people in accordance with the best American principles and standards," showing the organization's dedication to Americanization. Through organizations that supported Americanization being created before World War II, there came a larger divide between Mexican immigrants and Mexican-Americans.

Some Mexican Americans also rejected Americanization by creating a distinct identity influenced by the Black American counterculture of zoot suiters in the jazz and swing music scene on the east coast. Anti-assimilationist Mexican American as early as the 1940s youth rejected the previous generation's aspirations to assimilate into Anglo-American or American society and instead developed an "alienated pachuco culture that fashioned itself neither as Mexican nor American." Some pachucos/as and Mexican American youth began to identify as Chicano/a as early as the 1940s and 1950s. Identifying as Chicano/a was a way of reclaiming what had widely been used as a classist term of derision directed towards ethnic Mexicans who were not Americanized. Chicano/a was widely reclaimed in the 1960s and 1970s to express political empowerment, ethnic solidarity, and pride in being of Indigenous descent, diverging from Mexican American identity.

=== Poles ===
The study of Polish immigrants to the United States, The Polish Peasant in Europe and America (1918–1920), became the landmark first study of this process.

== Other uses ==
The term also is used for the cultural transformation of areas brought into the U.S., such as Alaska, and on the assimilation of Native Americans.

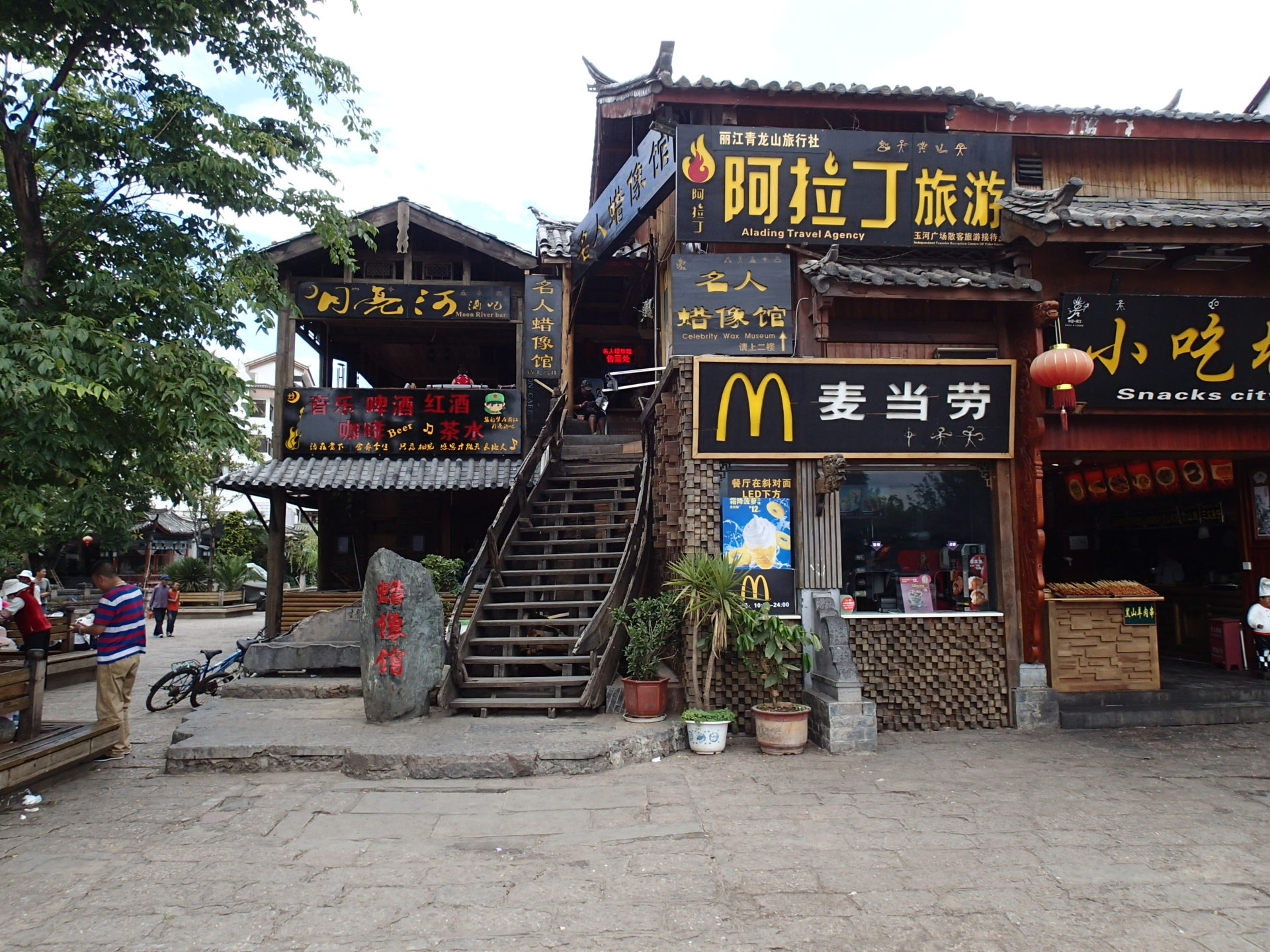
A photo of a McDonald's in Lijiang, China.

=== Impact on other countries ===
The term Americanization has been used since 1907 for the American impact on other countries. Other countries often perceive America to be one, if not the most powerful, modern nation in the world. As a result, many other countries have attempted to replicate elements of the American way of life.

== See also ==
- Americanization (foreign culture and media)
- Anglicisation of names
- Melting pot
- Civic nationalism, and its converse, ethnic nationalism
- Nativism
- Immigration to the United States of America
- Salad bowl (cultural idea)
- Americanization Now and Then
