= Luba Robin Goldsmith =

American dramatist

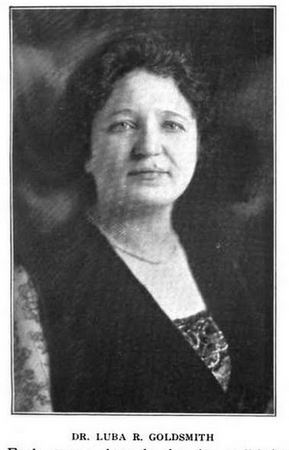
- Luba R. Goldsmith, from a 1922 publication
- Born: Luba Natalia Robin; January 17, 1879; Uman, Ukraine
- Died: October 7, 1931 (aged 52)
- Occupation: Physician
- Years active: 1903-1931
- Spouse: Milton Goldsmith
- Children: 2

Luba Robin Goldsmith (January 17, 1879 – October 7, 1931) was a Ukrainian-born American physician and clubwoman based in Pittsburgh, Pennsylvania.

== Early life ==
Luba Natalia Robin was born in Uman, Ukraine (then in the Russian Empire), the daughter of Nathaniel Robin and Beatrice Malamud Robin. She moved to the United States with her parents when she was a teen; she attended high school in Pittsburgh, Pennsylvania. She was the first woman admitted to the University of Pittsburgh School of Medicine, where she finished her medical degree in 1902. She pursued further study at the University of Pennsylvania, and abroad in Vienna and Berlin.

== Career ==
In Pittsburgh she was an inspector of the city's tenements from 1903 to 1905, and worked for improvements in the urban water supply. In 1911, she co-led a committee promoting free school lunches and building school kitchens in Pittsburgh. She chaired the United States Public Health Advisory Committee, and the public health committee of the National Council of Jewish Women. In 1922, she was appointed to the Women's Advisory Council of the United States Public Health Service.

She was medical advisor to women at the University of Pittsburgh from 1915 to 1919. She taught at the University of Pittsburgh and at the Carnegie Institute of Technology. She was president of the Woman's Medical Society of Pittsburgh, and held memberships in the Women's National Medical Society, the American Association of University Women, and the Women's International League for Peace and Freedom.

Goldsmith enjoyed writing, and in 1927 enrolled as a summer student at the University of Pittsburgh to take writing courses. "Medicine is one of the most excellent preparations for literature there is," she explained. "Doctors are permitted to study the human heart at a very close range." She wrote two plays to teach health concepts, Who Cares? and What Next?, and another play, East and West, and the Twain Shall Meet, written for the Pittsburgh chapter of Hadassah, in which she was also active Goldsmith also wrote articles about health for national Jewish publications.

== Personal life ==
Luba Robin married fellow doctor Milton Goldsmith in 1905. They had two sons, Norman and Albert. Luba Robin Goldsmith died in 1931, aged 52 years, after a surgery at the Mayo Clinic to treat cancer.

Since 1932, there has been a medical scholarship in her name at the University of Pittsburgh.
