= Tempelhof-Schöneberg 4 =

State electoral district of Germany

- Electoral district for the Berlin House of Representatives
- Tempelhof-Schöneberg 4 in 2026
- District: Tempelhof-Schöneberg
- Electorate: 32,710 (2026)

Current electoral district
- Party: Left
- Member: Sarah Bremer

Tempelhof-Schöneberg 4 is an electoral constituency (German: Wahlkreis) represented in the House of Representatives of Berlin. It elects one member via first-past-the-post voting.

== Geography ==
The constituency comprises the areas of Grazer Damm, the Lindenhof housing estate, Oberlandstraße, parts of Tempelhofer Damm, and the area around the former Tempelhof Airport, and is entirely within the borough of Tempelhof-Schöneberg.

There were 32,710 eligible voters in 2026.

== Members ==
Election	Member	Party	%
1990	Dieter Hapel	CDU	54.4
1995	Dieter Hapel	CDU	50.1
1999	Peter Rzepka	CDU	53.0
2001	Michael Müller	SPD	38.5
2006	Michael Müller	SPD	36.6
2011	Michael Müller	SPD	33.5
2016	Michael Müller	SPD	32.5
2021	Aferdita Suka	Greens	25.7
2023	Frank Luhmann	CDU	28.5
2026	Sarah Bremer	Left	25.5

== Election results ==
=== 2026 election ===
State election (2026): Tempelhof-Schöneberg 4
Notes:	Blue background denotes the winner of the electorate vote. Pink background denotes a candidate elected from their party list. Yellow background denotes an electorate win by a list member, or other incumbent. A ✓ or ✗ denotes status of any incumbent, win or lose respectively.						
Party	Candidate	Votes	%	±%	Party votes	%	±%
Left	Sarah Bremer	6,171	25.5	▲16.6	6,937	28.4	▲18.3
Greens	Aferdita Suka	5,929	24.5	▼1.9	4,537	18.6	▼4.7
CDU	✗ Frank Luhmann	4,091	16.9	▼11.5	3,996	16.4	▼11.4
SPD	Melanie Kühnemann-Grunow	3,441	14.2	▼5.8	3,457	14.2	▼4.9
AfD	Miriam Rita Schroiff	2,538	10.5	▲4.7	2,590	10.6	▲4.8
BSW	Michael Farrherr	979	4.0		1,049	4.3	
Volt	Laura Schmid	529	2.2		415	1.7	▲0.7
FDP	André Stammen	512	2.1	▼1.3	549	2.3	▼1.7
Tierschutzpartei					506	2.1	▼0.3
PARTEI					173	0.7	▼0.7
PdF					73	0.3	
ÖDP					32	0.1	Steady
DKP					28	0.1	Steady
du.					23	0.1	▼0.2
SGP					20	0.1	Steady
Informal votes		447			252		
Total valid votes		24,190			24,1385		
Turnout		24,637	75.3	▲10.6			
Left gain from CDU	Majority	242	1.0				

=== 2023 repeat election ===
Changes denoted below for the 2023 election are compared to the 2016 election, as the 2021 election was declared invalid.

State election (2023): Tempelhof-Schöneberg 4
Notes:	Blue background denotes the winner of the electorate vote. Pink background denotes a candidate elected from their party list. Yellow background denotes an electorate win by a list member, or other incumbent. A ✓ or ✗ denotes status of any incumbent, win or lose respectively.						
Party	Candidate	Votes	%	±%	Party votes	%	±%
CDU	Frank Luhmann	5,880	28.5	▲9.6	5,754	27.8	▲10.1
Greens	Aferdita Suka	5,462	26.4	▲7.8	4,822	23.3	▲4.2
SPD	Jens Fischwasser	4,146	20.1	▼12.4	3,955	19.1	▼6.5
Left	Philipp Bertram	1,837	8.9	▼0.3	2,106	10.2	▼0.4
AfD	Karsten Franck	1,206	5.8	▼5.2	1,211	5.8	▼5.3
FDP	Rainer Bleckmann	708	3.4	▼2.2	812	3.9	▼2.7
Tierschutzpartei	Mirko Claus	582	2.8		493	2.4	▲0.2
PARTEI	Annie Maria Tarrach	422	2.0		300	1.4	▼0.4
Volt					212	1.0	
Team Todenhöfer					200	1.0	
Mieterpartei	Raoul Domurath	163	0.8		54	0.3	
dieBasis	Heike Udes	128	0.6		106	0.5	
Gray Panthers					87	0.4	▼0.8
The Grays					81	0.4	
Pirates					79	0.4	▼1.5
Klimaliste					73	0.4	
du.					63	0.3	
FW	Katleen Kirsch	92	0.4		55	0.3	
Verjüngungsforschung					44	0.2	▼0.1
Humanists					37	0.2	
ÖDP	Marion Schmidt	36	0.2		31	0.1	
MW					30	0.1	▼0.2
Bildet Berlin!					22	0.1	
Bergpartei, die ÜberPartei					18	0.1	
SGP					16	0.1	▼0.2
DKP					15	0.1	Steady
The Pinks/Alliance 21					13	0.1	
NPD					12	0.1	▼0.2
LKR					7	0.0	▼0.7
BüSo					4	0.0	Steady
Informal votes		20,662			20,712		
Total valid votes		179			150		
Turnout		20,872	64.7	▼3.3			
CDU gain from SPD	Majority	418	2.1				

=== 2021 election (annulled) ===
The election in 2021 was annulled and rerun in 2023.

State election (2021): Tempelhof-Schöneberg 4
Notes:	Blue background denotes the winner of the electorate vote. Pink background denotes a candidate elected from their party list. Yellow background denotes an electorate win by a list member, or other incumbent. A ✓ or ✗ denotes status of any incumbent, win or lose respectively.						
Party	Candidate	Votes	%	±%	Party votes	%	±%
Greens	Aferdita Suka	6,267	25.7	▲7.0	5,682	23.1	▲4.0
SPD	Jens Fischwasser	5,846	24.0	▼8.5	5,397	21.9	▼3.7
CDU	Frank Luhmann	4,472	18.3	▼0.6	4,252	17.3	▼0.4
Left	Philipp Bertram	2,661	10.9	▲1.7	2,942	11.9	▲1.4
FDP	Rainer Bleckmann	1,509	6.2	▲0.6	1,596	6.5	▼0.1
AfD	Karsten Franck	1,307	5.4	▼5.7	1,334	5.4	▼5.7
Tierschutzpartei	Mirko Claus	819	3.4		548	2.2	▲0.1
Team Todenhöfer					539	2.2	
PARTEI	Annie Maria Tarrach	554	2.3		464	1.9	▲0.1
dieBasis	Heike Udes	409	1.7		316	1.3	
Volt					316	1.3	
FW	Katleen Kirsch	306	1.3		213	0.9	
The Grays					173	0.7	
Gray Panthers					137	0.6	▼0.7
Klimaliste					133	0.5	
Pirates					98	0.4	▼1.4
APT					89	0.4	
du.					60	0.2	
Mieterpartei	Raoul Domurath	167	0.7		60	0.2	
ÖDP	Marion Schmidt	91	0.4		57	0.2	
Humanists					47	0.2	
Verjüngungsforschung					38	0.2	▼0.2
Bildet Berlin!					30	0.1	
MW					20	0.1	
Bergpartei, die ÜberPartei					16	0.1	
SGP					16	0.1	▼0.2
NPD					15	0.1	▼0.2
LKR					13	0.1	▼0.6
DKP					12	0.1	Steady
The Pinks/Alliance 21					12	0.0	
BüSo					8	0.0	Steady
Informal votes		342			231		
Total valid votes		24,408			24,633		
Turnout		24,879	76.6	▲8.6			
Greens gain from SPD	Majority	421	1.7				

== See also ==
- Politics of Berlin
- House of Representatives of Berlin
