= Barbara Mandel =

American activist and philanthropist (1925–2019)

- Born: Barbara Abrams; December 13, 1925; Cleveland Ohio, U.S.
- Died: November 21, 2019 (aged 93); Palm Beach, Florida, U.S.
- Occupation(s): Activist and philanthropist
- Spouse: Morton Mandel (m. 1949; died 2019)

Barbara Abrams Mandel (December 13, 1925 – November 21, 2019) was an American activist and philanthropist. She was named to the Ohio Women's Hall of Fame in 1985. She was elected to two terms as President of the National Council of Jewish Women, which is the oldest Jewish women's organization in the country. Mandel and her husband Morton's operation, the Morton and Barbara Mandel Family Foundation, gave a $10 million gift to the Smithsonian’s Cooper-Hewitt, National Design Museum in 2014.

Mandel died on November 21, 2019, a month after her husband.
