= Edith Terry Bremer =

American activist

Edith Bremer (1885–1964) was born in Hamilton N.Y. and graduated from the University of Chicago in 1907. She pioneered immigrant social service work and had a major influence on the institute movement. She founded and led the International Institute movement, which was focused on improving the lives of female immigrants. The International Institute was a movement for cultural pluralism with efforts towards protection of immigrant girls in 1910. She was a resident at the University Chicago settlement as well as a researcher for the Chicago Women's Trade Union League. She then became a special agent for the United States Immigration Commission and also worked as a field investigator for the Chicago Juvenile Court. These field works inspired her to focus on the problems of female immigrants. She believed that other immigrant social welfare agencies, both public and private, poorly served women.

Bremer strongly opposed Americanization programs and wrote that Americanization stimulated fear and hate. She then served as a special agent for the United States Immigration Commission. Bremer was concerned that the existing public and private agencies serving immigrants largely ignored women so she made her most important contribution by establishing the first International Institute in New York City as a YWCA experiment in December, 1910. As a national field secretary for the National Board of the YWCA USA in New York, she began to work with immigrant girls. This institute was focused on assisting newly arrived and second-generation immigrant girls and women. It provided recreational and club activities, English classes, and assistance with employment, housing, naturalization and other problems. Trained social workers who were mostly immigrants themselves were the ones who did the teaching, visiting, counseling and casework. She inspired institute workers to begin working with immigrant communities as a whole by engaging in traditional settlement house tasks and handling immigrant problems as case workers. Their ideas helped preserve the immigrant heritage. Bremer and other International Institute workers became activates of cultural pluralism by accepting immigrants on their own terms. They attempted to ease their transition to American Society. By the early 1920s, over 55 international institutes had been established mainly in industrial cities with heavier immigrant populations such as Boston, Buffalo, and Detroit. In the 1920s and early 1930s Bremer helped organize new Institutes and made field visits to advise on programs as well as sponsor annual meetings of Institute workers. She later testified as an expert witness at congressional hearings on immigration policies.

== Early life ==
Bremer grew up in Chicago and did field research on women in industry at the Chicago School of Civics and Philanthropy. She was the elder daughter of Benjamin Stites and Mary Baldwin Terry. Benjamin Stites graduated from Colgate University in 1878 and served as a Baptist minister. While Bremer was born he was a history teacher at Colgate then he became a professor of English history at the University of Chicago.

== Marriage and children ==
Edith Terry married Harry M. Bremer on September 4, 1912. Harry Bremer was a resident at the Greenwich House settlement in New York City and then became a special agent with the National Child Labor Committee later on.

== Death and afterward ==
Died of cancer on September 12, 1964. After her death, former United States commissioner of immigration Edward Corsi paid a tribute to Bremer's concern for people of all nationalities and the effort she devoted to the welfare of immigrant and refugee.

== Bibliography ==
- Bowman, John S. "Bremer, Edith Terry." The Free Dictionary. Cambridge University Press, 1995. Web.
- Cullen-DuPont, Kathryn. Encyclopedia of Woman's History in America (Infobase Publishing, 2009) pp 34–35
- Fox, Cybelle. Three Worlds of Relief: Race, Immigration, and the American Welfare State from the Progressive Era to the New Deal (Princeton University Press, 2012).
- Mohl, Raymond A. The International Institute Movement and Ethnic Pluralism (Immigration History Research Center Website)
- Pozzetta, George E. Americanization, Social Control and Philanthropy Taylor & Francis, 1991. Web.
- Sicherman, Barbara. Notable American Women: The Modern Period Harvard University Press.

== See also ==
- Women's Trade Union League
