= Sarah Bremer =

German politician (born 1999)

Member of the Berlin House of Representatives
- Assuming office 29 October 2026
- Succeeding: Frank Luhmann
- Constituency: Tempelhof-Schöneberg 4

Personal details
- Born: 1999 (age 26–27)
- Party: Die Linke

Sarah Bremer (born 1999) is a German politician who was elected member of the Berlin House of Representatives in 2026. She has served as co-chair of Die Linke in Tempelhof-Schöneberg since 2026.
