= Sehmisch =

Sehmisch is a surname. It is a loanword which is used in German. Notable people with the surname are as follows:

- André Sehmisch (born 1964), German biathlete
- Elke Sehmisch (born 1955), German swimmer
- Yvonne Sehmisch, German paralympic athlete
