= Caj Bremer =

Finnish photographer and photojournalist (born 1929)

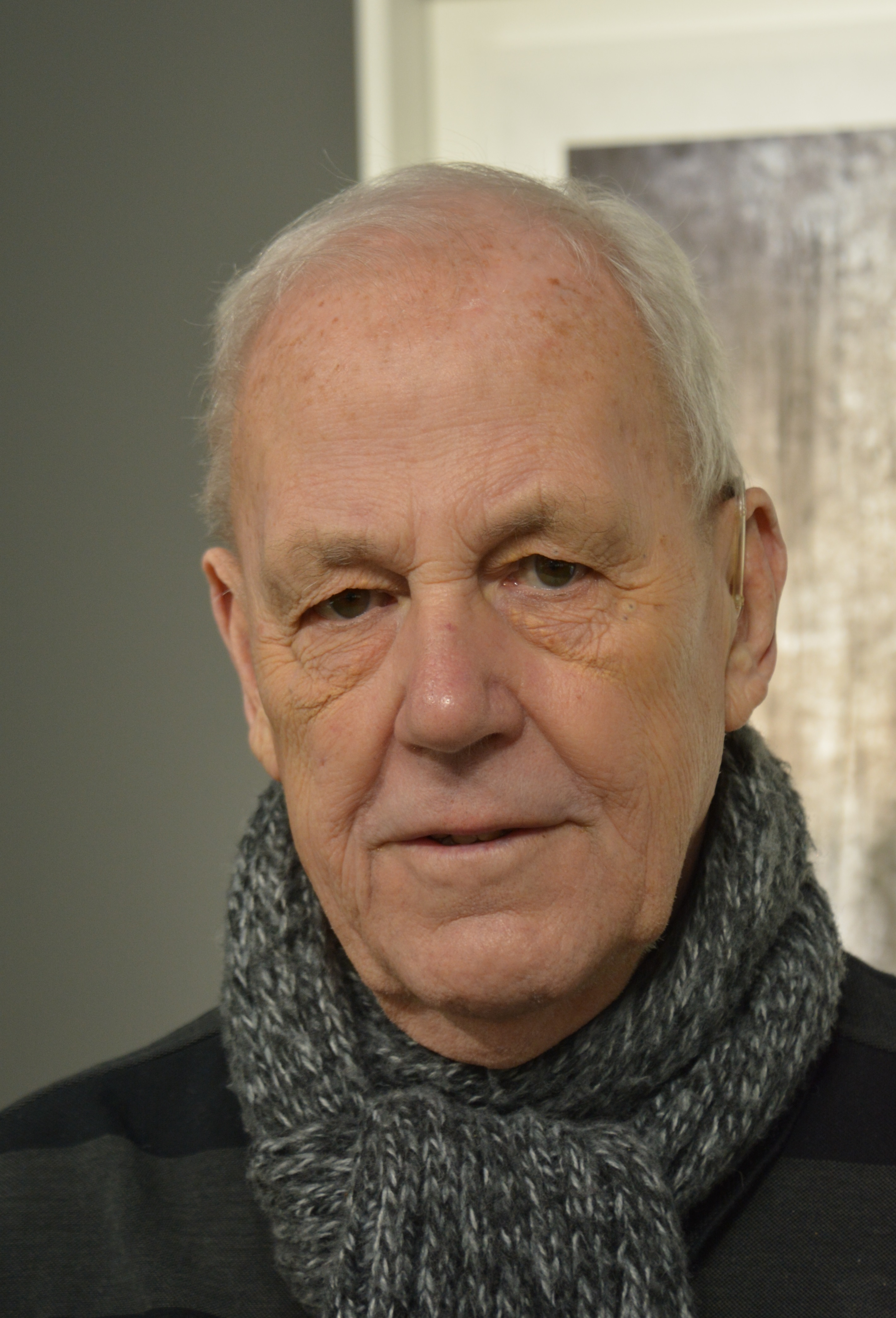
Caj Bremer 2016

Carl-Johan (Caj) Bremer (born February 22, 1929) is a Finnish photographer and photojournalist. He published his memoirs Exploits of a Blunderer in 2001. A major retrospective of his work was held at the Ateneum Art Museum in Helsinki in 2010.
