= Bremer River =

The Bremer River is the name of several rivers in Australia:

- Bremer River (Queensland) is a tributary of the Brisbane River
- Bremer River (South Australia) flows into Lake Alexandrina near the end of the Murray River
- Bremer River (Western Australia) flows to sea on the south coast between Albany and Esperance
- Bremer River (Northern Territory) is on Melville Island (Northern Territory)
