= National Council of Jewish Women =

U.S-based non-profit organization

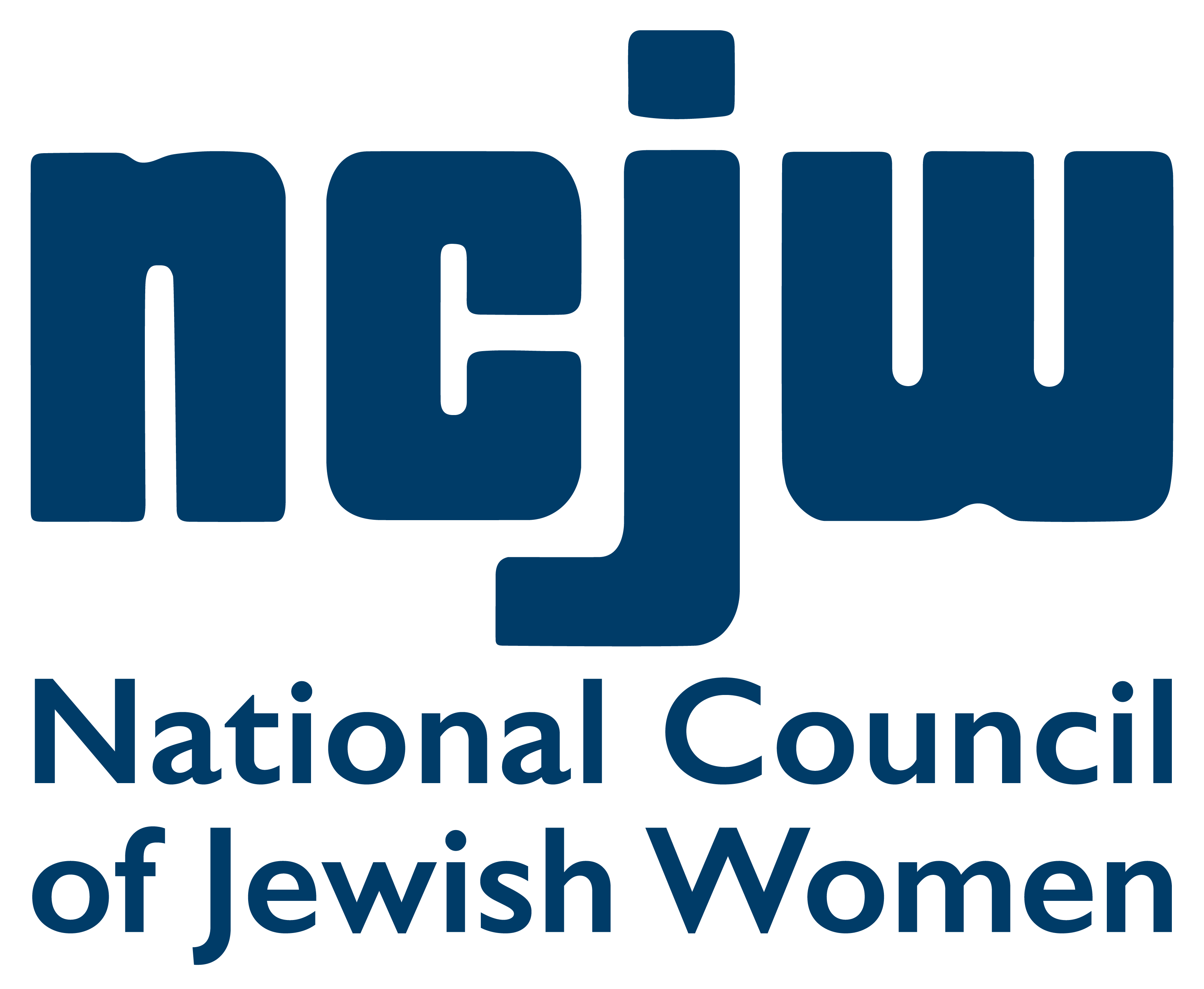

National Council of Jewish Women (NCJW) is a 501(c)(3) tax-exempt organization. Founded in 1893, NCJW describes itself as the oldest Jewish women's grassroots organization in the United States and currently has over 250,000 advocates. As of 2026, it has over 40 sections across 20 states. NCJW focuses on expanding abortion access, securing federal judicial appointments, promoting voting integrity, and mobilizing Israeli feminist movements. These objectives are advanced through lobbying, research, education, and community engagement.

NCJW's headquarters are located in Washington, D.C., with staff spread across the U.S. and Israel. The current president is Laura Monn Ginsburg and the Chief Executive Officer is Jody Rabhan.

== History ==
In 1893, Hannah G. Solomon of Chicago was asked to organize the participation of Jewish women for the Chicago World's Fair. When Solomon and her recruits discovered that they were not invited to contribute to the proceedings but were instead expected to serve coffee and act as hostesses, they withdrew. In response, the women sought to form an organization that would strengthen women's connection to Judaism and pursue a wide-ranging social justice agenda. That agenda included advocating for women's and children's rights, assisting Jewish immigrants, advancing social welfare, defending Jews and Judaism, advancing Jewish identity, and generally incorporating Jewish values into their work. According to Faith Rogow, author of Gone to Another Meeting: The National Council of Jewish Women (1893–1993), "NCJW was the offspring of the economic and social success achieved by German Jewish immigrants in the United States. As this community of German Jews matured and stabilized, it faced the same challenge to gender role definitions that had accompanied the Jacksonian Democracy a half-century earlier." (Rogow 1995:2)

Initially, NCJW focused on educating Jewish women and helping Jewish immigrants become self-sufficient through adult study circles, vocational training, school health programs, and free community health dispensaries.

=== 20th century ===
In the early 1900s, NCJW began to respond to wider needs within its community, working closely with the settlement movement to help the economically disadvantaged and independently advocating for social legislation on low-income housing, child labor, public health, and food and drug regulations. Promoting civil rights, NCJW also argued for a federal anti-lynching law in 1908.

During World War I, NCJW raised funds for war relief in Europe and Russia and advocated for the Nineteenth Amendment. In the 1920s, NCJW was involved in founding the first ten birth control clinics in the U.S., which later became Planned Parenthood health centers.

As the Depression began, NCJW became involved in government programs to provide relief and help the unemployed find jobs while continuing its legislative efforts for social legislation. During the 1940s, NCJW called for an end to segregation and racial discrimination. World War II saw NCJW engage in rescuing Jewish children from Germany and working to reunite thousands of displaced persons with family members, as well as a broad range of other relief efforts.

During World War II, NCJW engaged in rescuing Jewish children from Germany and working to reunite thousands of displaced persons with family members, as well as a broad range of other relief efforts. After the war, NCJW fought to preserve civil liberties during the McCarthy era. It also helped develop the Meals on Wheels program for the elderly and pioneered the Senior Service Corps to help seniors lead productive lives as volunteers.

After calling for an end to segregation and racial discrimination in the 1940s, the organization joined the emerging civil rights movement and participated in the drive to enact and promote civil rights programs addressing issues on prejudice, voting rights, and economic inequality in the 1960s. During this time, NCJW also involved itself in the revitalized women's movement. In the 1970s, NCJW published a series of documents, including: Windows on Day Care, the first nationwide survey of day care facilities and services; Children Without Justice, a study of the US Justice Department's work with foster children; and Innocent Victims, a comprehensive manual on child abuse detection and prevention.

In 1993, NCJW led a letter-writing campaign to have several racial slurs removed from the Official Scrabble Players Dictionary, including the definition of the word "Jew", which was listed as a verb defined as "To bargain with - an offensive term." Amid accusations of censorship, Hasbro eventually announced a compromise: the Official Scrabble Players Dictionary would exclude several offensive words, and the Official Tournament and Club Word List, which does not include definitions, would include them.

=== 21st century ===
In 2020, NCJW launched Rabbis for Repro, an organization of rabbis supporting reproductive rights.

In 2021, the D.C. chapter of the Sunrise Movement called for the removal of NCJW, the Religious Action Center of Reform Judaism, and the Jewish Council for Public Affairs from a voting rights coalition due to their ties to Israel and Zionism. Sunrise later apologized and retracted the statement after criticism from Jewish and Non-Jewish organizations.

==== Change in direction ====
In 2025, the national umbrella organization formed a new strategy for the organization and required local chapters to make a decision about their futures based on it. The process started in 2024. Beginning around 2023, the national board began to survey the overall organization. They determined that there were financial and leadership issues at many chapters, and a lack of engagement with younger potential members. A membership survey led by a consultant they had hired determined that priorities and activity were inconsistent across the local chapters; and that overall membership was most interested in political advocacy in several distinct areas, and less on direct social welfare activity. The new plan was to change focus from local, independent chapters to centralized regional management, with non-core activities being shut down or trasnferred to other organizations. Many of the affiliates had unique, independent ongoing social welfare projects where they dedicated much of their funds. The two approaches being strategically incompatible, the central committee offered each chapter three choices:

- affiliation: transition to the new model, with a loss of autonomy and loss of local nonstrategic initiatives, and the possible loss of paid staff
- disaffiliation: change the name of the organization and sever ties, and operate as a legal entity separate from the national organization
- integration: remain semi-autonomous, but with a commitment to the same core areas as the national organization; this option was only made available to a half dozen affiliates that had large budgets

As of June 2026, this led to the disbanding of two small chapters, and the disaffiliation of three larger chapters. The remaining affiliates have until December 2027 to make a decision.

The new core activities are abortion rights, pay equality, economic security, and combating antisemitism, which includes Israel advocacy.

=== Audio interviews ===
The University of Pittsburgh houses a collection of audio interviews produced by NCJW. Over one hundred audio interviews produced by the Pittsburgh Chapter of NCJW are available online. Those interviewed describe their interactions and affiliations with historical events such as emigration, synagogue events, and professional activities. These interviews also include information about personal life events, episodes of discrimination against Jews, moving from Europe to America, and meeting Enrico Caruso, Robert Oppenheimer, Jonas Salk and other historical figures. Others who were interviewed came to America but were born elsewhere, with Jews from Austria, Brazil, Cuba, Haiti, Hungary, India, Israel, Korea, Poland, and other countries describing their experiences.

== Council presidents ==
Council presidents at the national level:

- 1893–1905 Hannah G. Solomon
- 1905–1908 Pauline Hanauer Rosenberg
- 1908–1913 Marion Simon Misch
- 1913–1920 Janet Simons Harris
- 1920–1926 Rose Brenner
- 1926 Constance Sporborg
- 1926–1932 Ida W. Friend
- 1932–1938 Fanny Brin
- 1938–1943 Blanche Goldman
- 1943–1949 Mildred G. Welt
- 1949–1955 Katharine Engel
- 1955–1959 Gladys F. Cahn
- 1959–1963 Viola Hymes
- 1963–1967 Pearl Willen
- 1967–1971 Josephine Weiner
- 1971–1975 Eleanor Marvin
- 1975–1979 Esther R. Landa
- 1979–1983 Shirley I. Leviton
- 1983–1987 Barbara A. Mandel
- 1987–1990 Lenore Feldman
- 1990–1993 Joan Bronk
- 1993–1996 Susan Katz
- 1996–1999 Nan Rich
- 1999–2002 Jan Schneiderman
- 2002–2005 Marsha Atkind
- 2005–2008 Phyllis Snyder
- 2008–2011 Nancy Ratzan
- 2011–2014 Linda Slucker
- 2014–2017 Debbie Hoffmann
- 2017–2020 Beatrice Kahn
- 2020–2023 Dana Gershon
- 2023–present Laura Monn Ginsburg

== Notable members ==
Other notable members include:

- Mary M. Cohen
- Nina Morais Cohen, one of the founders of the National Council of Jewish Women
- Julia I. Felsenthal, one of the founders of the National Council of Jewish Women
- Cecilia Greenstone, known as "the Angel of Ellis Island"
- Luba Robin Goldsmith
- Rebekah Bettelheim Kohut, founder of the World Congress of Jewish Women, which later became the International Council of Jewish Women
- Minnie Dessau Louis, one of the founders of the National Council of Jewish Women
- Babette Mandel
- Maud Nathan
- Seraphine Eppstein Pisko
- Cecilia Razovsky
- Julia Richman
- Danya Ruttenberg, scholar-in-residence
- Rosa Sonneschein, founder and editor of The American Jewess magazine
- Pauline Perlmutter Steinem, Jewish American suffragist, and grandmother of feminist Gloria Steinem

== See also ==
- Child protection
- Reform Judaism

== Bibliography ==
- Cooper, Victoria. (2015) The Story of NCJW San Francisco Section: 115 Years of Courage, Compassion and Community Service
- Mayer, T. (1994) Women and the Israeli Occupation: The Politics of Change ISBN 0-415-09546-8
- Misra, K., Rich, M. (2003) Jewish Feminism in Israel: Some Contemporary Perspectives ISBN 1-58465-325-6
- Nadell, P. (2003) American Jewish Women's History ISBN 0-8147-5808-8
- Rogow, F. (2005) Gone to Another Meeting: The National Council of Jewish Women (1893-1993) ISBN 0-8173-0671-4
- De Lange, N., Freud-Kandel, M. (2005) Modern Judaism: An Oxford Guide ISBN 0-19-926287-X

== Archives and collections of information ==
- Guide to the National Council of Jewish Women Collection at the Leo Baeck Institute
- National Council of Jewish Women, Indianapolis Section, Archives
- National Council of Jewish Women Records at the Library of Congress
- A Guide to the National Council of Jewish Women, San Antonio Section, University of Texas at San Antonio Libraries (UTSA Libraries) Special Collections
- National Council of Jewish Women, New York Section at the American Jewish Historical Society in New York
- National Council of Jewish Women, Greater Minneapolis section records at the Upper Midwest Jewish Archives, University of Minnesota Libraries
- National Council of Jewish Women, St. Paul section records at the Upper Midwest Jewish Archives, University of Minnesota Libraries
- National Council of Jewish Women (Rochester Division) Records, Rare Books, Special Collections, and Preservation, River Campus Libraries, University of Rochester
- National Council of Jewish Women Records, Department of Service for the Foreign Born (New York and Brooklyn sections), Yeshiva University Archives
