= Cecilia Greenstone =

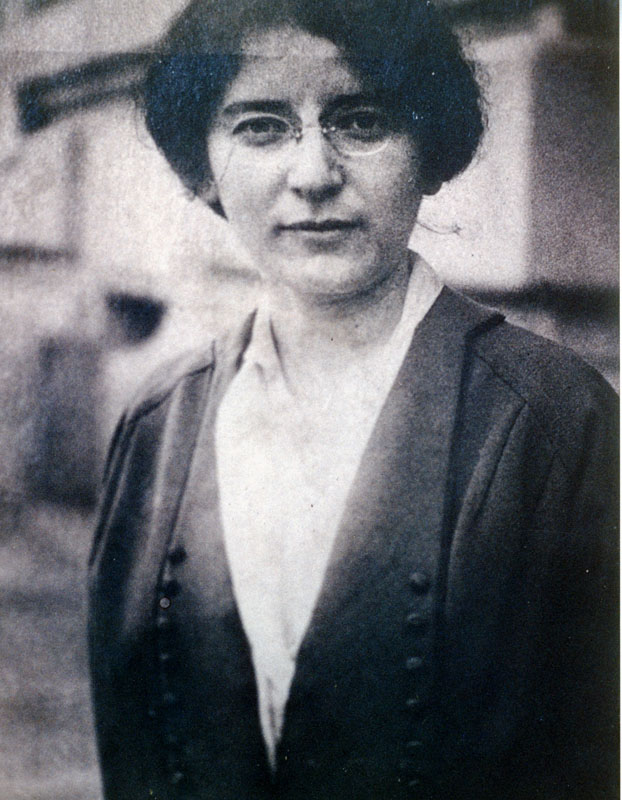
Greenstone in 1918

Cecilia Greenstone Arnow (November 18, 1887–December 23, 1971) was a social worker in New York who became known as "the Angel of Ellis Island".

== Early life ==
Cecilia Greenstone was born on November 18, 1887, in Bialystock, Russian Poland. In Bialystock, Greenstone managed her father's cigarette factory and helped the factory workers to form a labor union. She was part of a socialist vigilante group. Greenstone and her family immigrated to the United States in 1905. After settling in New York, Greenstone taught herself English at the Astor Place Library, in addition to Hebrew, German, and Yiddish.

== Career ==
The head of the Hebrew Division of the Astor Place Library hired Greenstone as an assistant. Greenstone then became a translator for Jacob Schiff. The National Council of Jewish Women hired Greenstone in 1907 to assist newly arrived women and children at Ellis Island. She provided translations, intervened when inspectors rejected immigrants, and guided her charges through the immigration process. For Jewish immigrants, Greenstone established Shabbat services and arranged for deliveries of kosher food to hospital patients. One of her purposes was to ensure that unaccompanied women were not taken advantage of or misled. Many years later, Greenstone said:

To rescue human dignity from this nightmare — that was the single thought my co-workers and I had.

In addition to her duties on Ellis Island, Greenstone assisted the immigrant community in New York by teaching English, arranging activities and events to expose the newly-settled immigrants to American life, and helped to arrange both jobs and marriages.

Greenstone became the NCJW's head agent in 1912. Greenstone helped more than 60,000 women and children as they passed through Ellis Island, and became known as "the Angel of Ellis Island".

Greenstone was sent to Riga in Russian Latvia aboard the Russian steamer Kursk in August, 1914, to inspect a Russian facility for housing Jewish emigrants on behalf of the Hebrew Immigrant Aid Society. With the declaration of war by the United Kingdom on Germany the day before the Kursk was to land, the ship was diverted. During World War I, access to Ellis Island was restricted; Greenstone was the only woman on the committee of seven permitted to visit the island to provide assistance to immigrants.

Immigration to the United States decreased during World War I and the number of Jewish immigrants became restricted. After leaving her role on Ellis Island in 1919, Greenstone continued her social work in New York. She was employed at Hamilton House, Henry Street, and Grand Street Settlement.

== Family and death ==
Cecilia Greenstone married Joseph Michael Arnow and they had two daughters. Greenstone died on December 23, 1971, in New Brunswick, New Jersey. Archives of Emily and David Alman, Greenstone's daughter and son-in-law, are held in the Julius and Ethel Rosenberg Archive at the Howard Gotlieb Archival Research Center and contain letters from Cecilia Greenstone.
