= Bremmer =

Bremmer may refer to:

- Henk Bremmer, Dutch art critic
- Ian Bremmer, political scientist and president of Eurasia Group
- Jan N. Bremmer, Dutch academic and historian
- Richard Bremmer, a British actor
- Rolf Bremmer, a Dutch scholar

== See also ==
- Bremer (disambiguation)
