= Marion Simon Misch =

Jewish activist

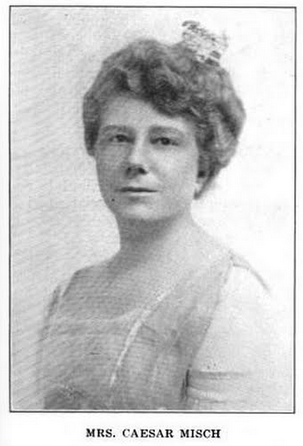
- Misch in a 1922 publication
- Born: Marion Louise Simon; May 13, 1869; Allentown, Pennsylvania, U.S.
- Died: January 18, 1941 (aged 71); Providence, Rhode Island, U.S.
- Known for: President, National Council of Jewish Women (1908-1913); President, Rhode Island State Federation of Women's Clubs

Marion Louise Simon Misch (May 13, 1869 – January 18, 1941) was an American activist, teacher, writer, and businesswoman in Providence, Rhode Island. She served as president of the National Council of Jewish Women (1908-1913) and president of the Rhode Island State Federation of Women's Clubs. She founded the Providence Plantation Club and co-founded the Providence section of the National Council of Jewish Women.

== Early life ==
She was born in Allentown, Pennsylvania (some sources say Newark, New Jersey) in 1869. Her father was Louis Benjamin Simon and her mother was Rachel Pulaski Simon. She had one brother and two sisters. She grew up in Pittsfield, Massachusetts, attending public school there. When she was 14, she organized and taught the first Sabbath School in Pittsfield. She later trained to be a schoolteacher.

In 1890, she married Caesar Misch (1857-1908), a native of Berlin. After ten years in Brooklyn, the couple moved to Providence, Rhode Island, where Misch opened his first department store. His holdings would expand to ten department stores throughout New England. After his unexpected death in 1908, Marion became the only female owner of a department store in Providence.

== Activities ==
In 1905, she helped found the Providence section of the National Council of Jewish Women, serving as its first president, and in 1908 was appointed third president of the National Council of Jewish Women, a position she held for five years. She also served as president of various charitable societies. She was a member of the board of directors of the Providence Society for Organizing Charity, a member of the board of managers of the Providence District Nursing Association, and a member of the Sex Hygiene Committee of the Rhode Island State Conference of Charities.

Her activism extended to both Jewish and non-Jewish activities in Providence. She was a member of the Providence school board from 1925 to 1939, supervising the expansion of music education in city schools. In 1921 she became the first Jewish president of the Rhode Island Federation of Women's Clubs. She was also vice president of the Providence Civic and Park Association, president of the Rhode Island Federation of Music Clubs, director of the Providence Association for the Blind, and founder of the Providence Plantation Club.

Misch was the first female member of the Providence Playground Committee, having been appointed by both Republican and Democratic mayors, and having entire charge of purchasing all the supplies. She served as Chairman of the North End Free Dispensary, which she organized under auspices of the Providence Section, Council of Jewish Women.

== Works ==
Misch co-wrote a Children's Service for the Day of Atonement (Fox and Saunders, 1907) and compiled Selections for Homes and Schools (Jewish Publication Society, 1911). She also penned newspaper articles on Jewish topics and on white slave traffic, and wrote Jewish prose and poetry.

She spoke extensively on music, education, women's issues, and Jewish issues on her lecture tours in the United States, Canada, Germany, China, India, and Australia.

== Personal ==
Marion and her husband Caesar Misch had one son, Walter (1891-1957), and one daughter, Dorothy Louise (1896-1918). While she and her family were not religious, she harbored an affinity for cultural Judaism throughout her life. She and her husband joined Temple Beth El of Providence, where their son was confirmed. She was one of the first presidents of the Temple Beth El Sisterhood, and often spoke on Jewish topics for the National Council of Jewish Women and other groups.

She died on January 18, 1941, in Providence, aged 71. She was buried in the Sons of Israel and David Cemetery.
