= Martin Bremer (footballer) =

German footballer

Personal information
- Date of birth: 11 May 1954
- Position: Forward

Senior career*
Years	Team	Apps	(Gls)
1978	SV Darmstadt 98		
1978–1979	SV Waldhof Mannheim		
1979–1981	FSV Frankfurt		
1981–1982	Viktoria Griesheim		

Managerial career
- 1996: SV Darmstadt 98 (caretaker)
- * Club domestic league appearances and goals

Martin Bremer (born 11 May 1954) is a retired German football striker.
