= Bernhard Felsenthal =

German-American rabbi (1822–1908)

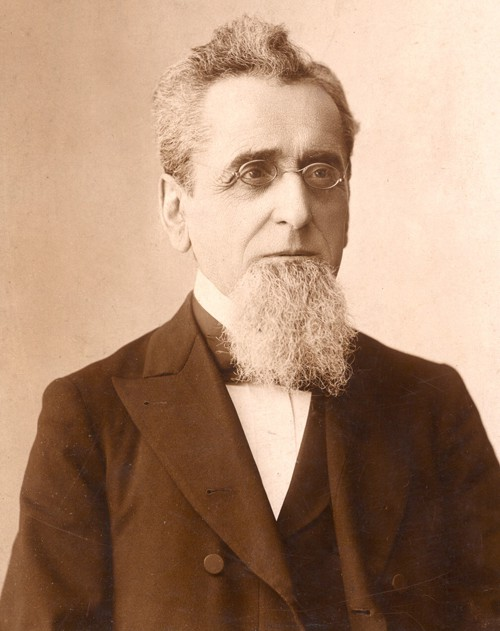

Bernhard Felsenthal (January 2, 1822 – January 12, 1908) was a German-born American rabbi.

== Life ==
Felsenthal was born on January 2, 1822, in Münchweiler, near Kaiserslautern, the Rhenish Palatinate, Bavaria, the son of Simon Felsenthal and Eva Gall.

As a boy, Felsenthal went to the secular school in Kaiserslautern and the Polytechnic High School in Munich. He then enrolled at the Ludwig-Maximilians-Universität München (LMU) in 1838 in order to pursue a career as a civil servant. But as he could not enter the Bavarian state administration because he was a Jew, he left the university and returned to his home region in 1840. He then attended a teachers' seminary in Kaiserslautern until 1842 and then worked as a teacher for the Jewish community in Münchweiler.

In 1854, Felsenthal immigrated to America and settled in Madison, Indiana, where he worked as a rabbi and teacher for three years. In 1858, he moved to Chicago, Illinois and began working in the Greenebaum Brothers banking house. The Jüdische Reformverein was founded that year, and he became its secretary and one of its founders. He focused on rabbinical and theological study while working as a clerk with Greenebaum Brothers, and he was ordained a rabbi by David Einhorn and Samuel Adler. Influenced by Einhorn, he became one of the first advocates for Reform Judaism in the Midwest. In 1859, he published a statement on Reform Judaism called Kol Kore ba-Midbar: Ueber Juedische Reform. A strong opponent of slavery, he refused a pulpit in Mobile, Alabama. When the Reformverein developed into the Sinai Congregation in 1861, he became its first rabbi. In 1864, he became rabbi of the newly formed Zion Congregation. He served as rabbi there until his retirement in 1887.

He took an active part in the Jewish Publication Society of America since its founding in 1888, and he supported the creation of an American Jewish Historical Society before its founding in 1892. He was one of the first Jews born in Western Europe to favor participation in the First Zionist Congress in Basel, Switzerland in 1897. He was a member of the Zionist Executive Council and vice-president of the Federation of American Zionists. He received an honorary Ph.D. from the University of Chicago in 1866, an honorary D.D. from Hebrew Union College in 1902, and an honorary D.D. from the Jewish Theological Seminary in 1905. He wrote an elementary grammar on the Hebrew language in 1868, several pamphlets, and 250 miscellaneous essays for periodicals.

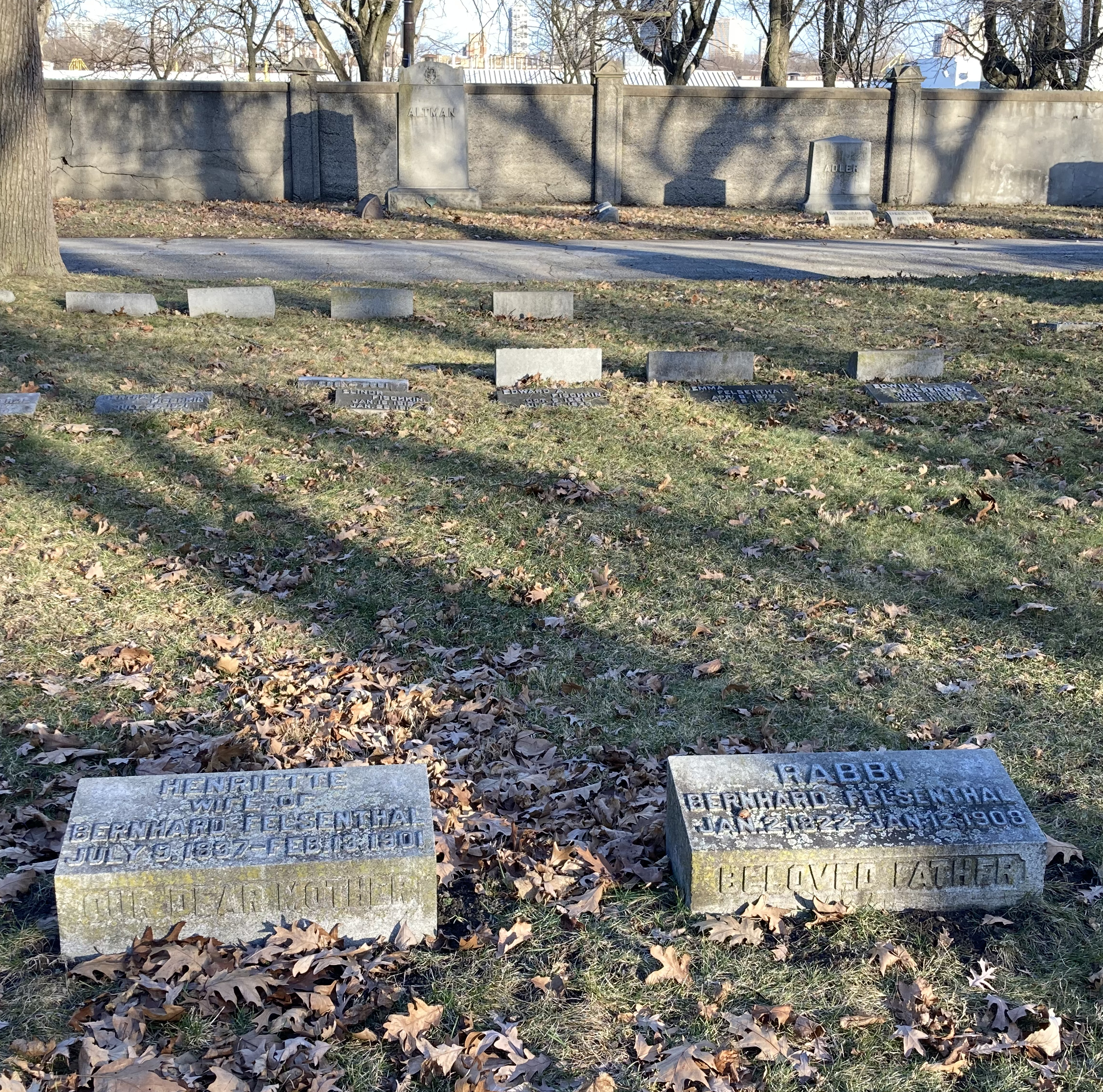
Felsenthal's grave at Rosehill Cemetery

Felsenthal was opposed to Isaac Mayer Wise and the establishment of a rabbinical seminary, as he did not believe American Jewry was ready for it, and in 1878 he declined an offer to teach at Hebrew Union College. He was an advocate for Jewish day schools. He became an ardent Zionist later in his career and became concerned that Reform Judaism was preparing Judaism for a "beautiful death." He participated in the Philadelphia Rabbinical Conference in 1869, but he was generally opposed to establishing an American Synod. A vocal community spokesperson, he headed a petition for systemic ethical instruction in public schools in 1881 and was opposed to an attempt to introduce Bible readings in public schools. While he generally was not politically active, in 1882 he declared himself a candidate in the Illinois Senate, writing in the Chicago Tribune that he was opposed to Sunday laws, prohibition, and blind party loyalty in local affairs. In 1879, he became an honorary member of the Free Religious Association. He was active in B'nai B'rith and the Zion Literary Association.

In 1862, Felsenthal married Caroline Levi. She died in 1863, and their only child, Ida, died young. In 1865, he married Henrietta Blumenfeld. They had five children. His daughter Emma wrote a biography on Felsenthal in 1924 called Bernhard Felsenthal, Teacher in Israel.

Felsenthal died on January 12, 1908. His funeral took place in Isaiah Temple. He was buried in Rosehill Cemetery.
