= Marieberg, Stockholm =

Urban district in Stockholm, Sweden

Coordinates: 59°19′42.34″N 18°1′6.88″E

Marieberg is a district located on the island of Kungsholmen in Stockholm City Centre, Sweden. Marieberg is part of the Borough of Kungsholmen. It is located west of Fridhemsgatan/Riddarfjärden, south of Drottningholmsvägen and east of Essingeleden/Viktor Rydbergs gata. In the south Marieberg borders the Mariebergsfjärden.

== History ==
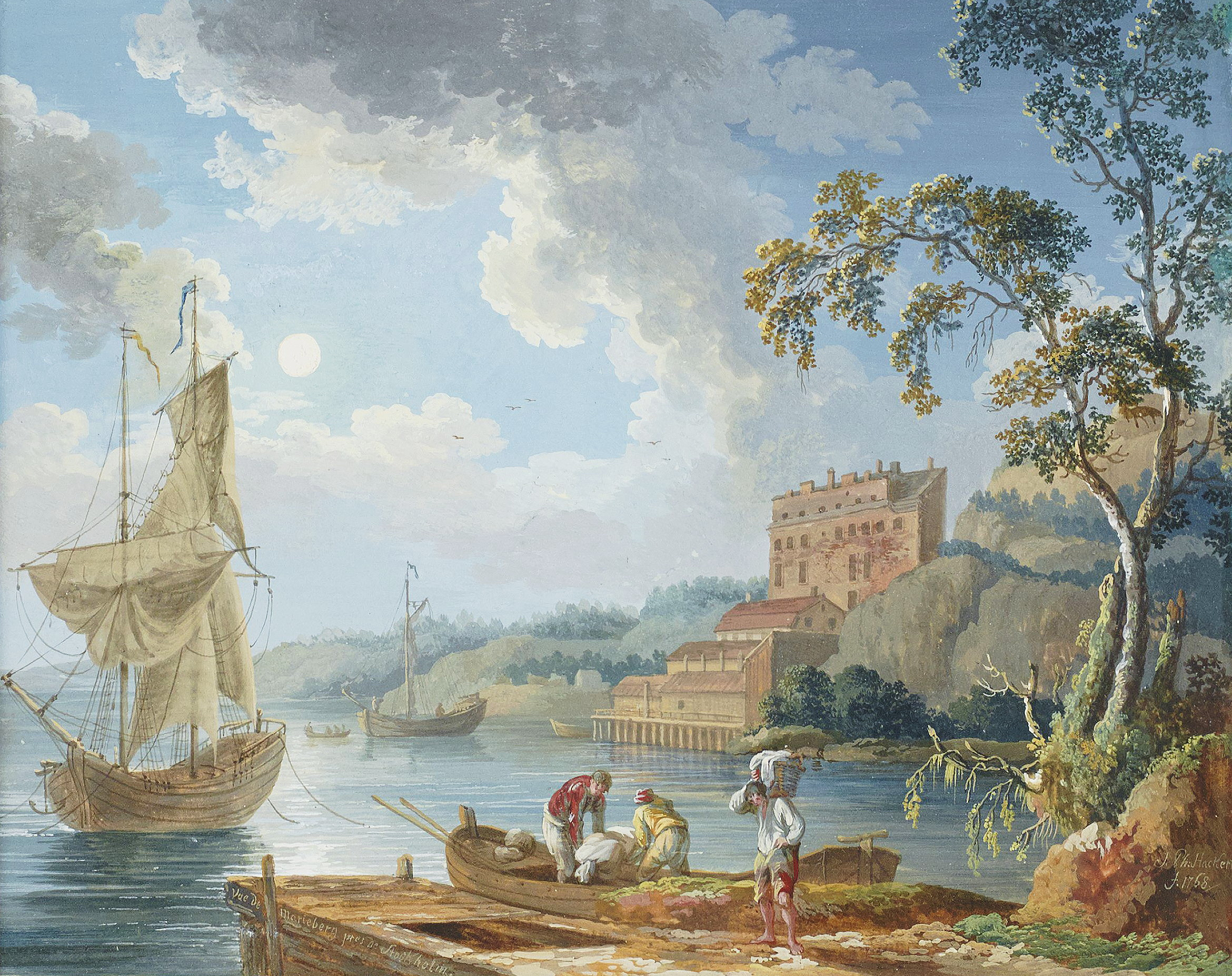
Marieberg porcelain factory around 1768, seen from Smedsudden, painting by Jacob Philipp Hackert.

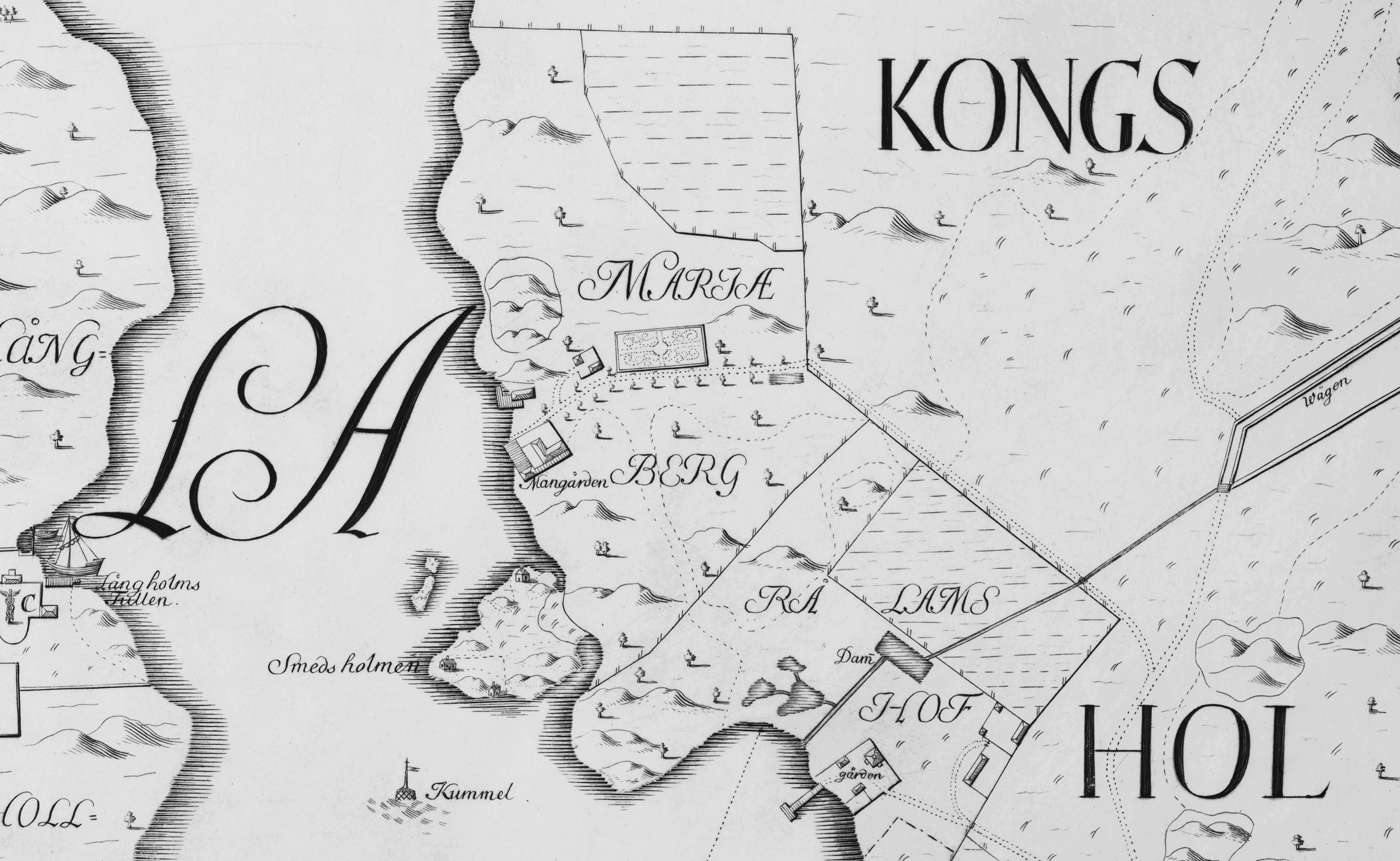
Petrus Tillaeus' map from 1733 showing the properties of Marieberg and Rålambshov (north is to the right).

Marieberg has its name after the Marieberg malmgård (suburban manor), which was erected in the 1640s on the shores of Lake Mälaren for the Riksråd Bengt Skytte. He named the farm after his daughter Maria, the wife of the Master of the Horse Gustav Adam Banér. Of this first settlement, only Triewald's malmgård is preserved today, which is called Mangården on Petrus Tillaeus' map from 1733 and may be identical to Marieberg's malmgård.

In the area south of Rålambsvägen was Marieberg's porcelain factory (1758–1788), as well as the Marieberg military area (with, among others, the Higher Artillery School (Högre artilleriläroverket) 1818–1869, the Train Battalion (Trängbataljonen) 1885–1891, the Field Telegraph Corps 1908–1937, the Signal Regiment 1937–1940, as well as the Swedish Army Signal School (1945–1958). There was also an ammunition factory at Marieberg 1876–1950. The Marieberg Stone (Mariebergsstenen) is reminiscent of this.

Up until the early 1960s, the popularly named Millis was still a large fenced area, including the later newspaper area (between Rålambsvägen and the later Gjörwellsgatan), the current embassy area Lilla berget, and the Stora berget above Smedsudden.

The development of the area began with Wivalliusgatan's house down by the water. A little later, the two large residential buildings were erected on the heights of Marieberg. The light plastered building (due to its wrinkled facade also called "Dragspelshuset") in the neighborhood of Lysbomben was built in 1961–1962. It is a 16-storey house with 210 apartments and about 1,200 m^{2} of office space. To the west, the Riksbyggen built the Silvieberg 3 property in the 1960s, a residential complex with alternating bands of reddish-brown and light-plastered parts, reminiscent of a bacon slice, which is why the house was nicknamed Bacon-Hill.

== Today's Marieberg ==
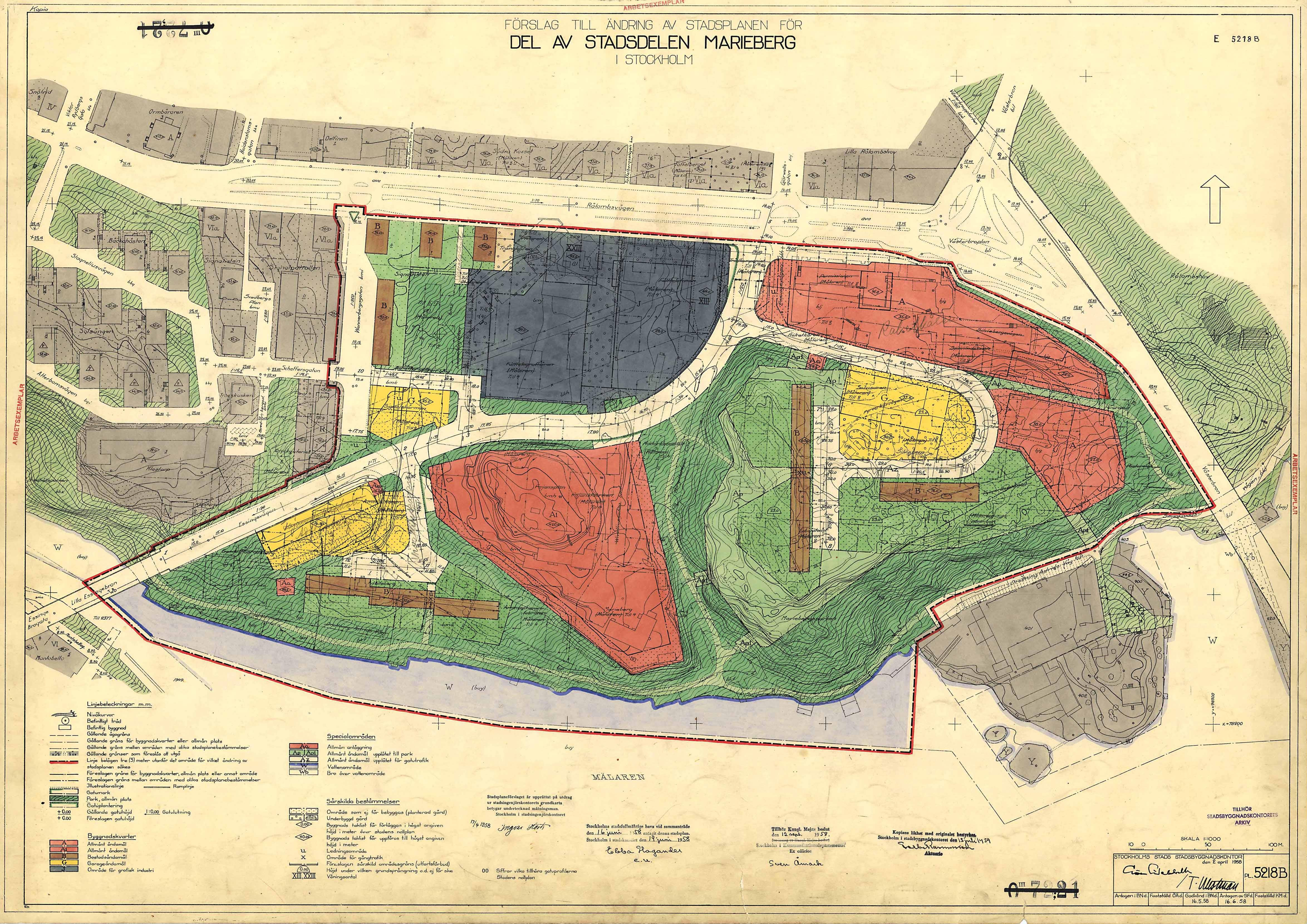
The city plan for Marieberg from 1958.

A large part of today's building in Marieberg originated in the early 1960s and goes back to a 1958 city plan, signed by Göran Sidenbladh. The plan for the area was originally drawn up by architect Åke Ahlström and was intended for a concerted development of different tall houses with different functions and different proportions. In the northern part, an industrial area was established for the graphic industry, intended for the newspapers Dagens Nyheter and Svenska Dagbladet's printing plants, distribution centers and editorial offices. To the south and west of Dagens Nyheter and Svenska Dagbladet's new buildings, the city plan continued with a plot for a foreign embassy (Russian Embassy in Stockholm), a plot for the National Archives main building and blocks for two tall residential buildings (Dragspelshuset/Erlanderhuset and the so-called Bacon-Hill).

In Marieberg are Rålambshovsparken and Mariebergsparken as well as the northern part of Västerbron. The National Archives, the National Board of Health and Welfare and some of the major newspapers also have premises in Marieberg. However, only the editors remain in Marieberg, the printing press moved to Akalla in the 1990s. Marieberg's cityscape is dominated by the 23-storey high Dagens Nyheter Tower, where the letters at the top of the house constantly alternate between Dagens Nyheter and Expressen, as well as the slightly lower SvD-huset in red brick. Near the bridge to Lilla Essingen, Mariebergsbron, is Villa Adolfsberg. Within a larger fenced area is the Russian Embassy. Down by the water is the Sea Scouts in Triewald's malmgård. To the east lies Smedsudden with Smedsuddsbadet.

In the early 2000s, the Stockholm Institute of Education had its premises in the former mental hospital Konradsberg and Fredhälls folkskola. Campus Konradsberg was created for the Stockholm Institute of Education, which was expanded with several new buildings. Already a few years after moving in, Stockholm University decided that the Stockholm Institute of Education should be integrated into the university's other operations at Frescati and the premises at Campus Konradsberg were therefore gradually phased out. The campus area's then owner, Akademiska Hus, then chose to develop Campus Konradsberg into a school campus for schools with special competence, among them the Manilaskolan and the Hällsboskolan and Stockholm International Montessori School.

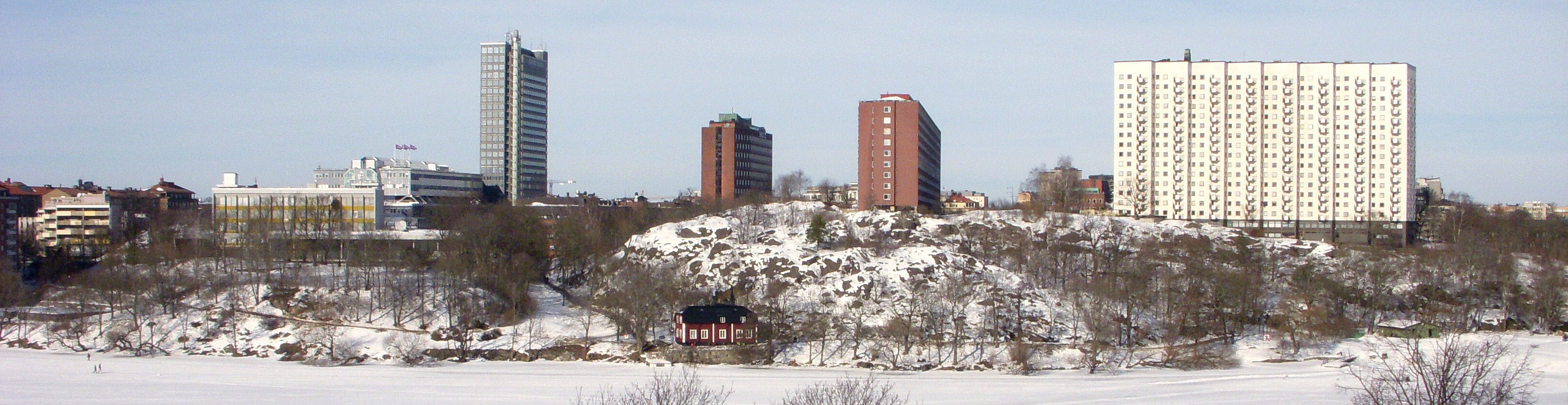
Panorama of Marieberg
