= Campus Konradsberg =

Campus in Stockholm, Sweden

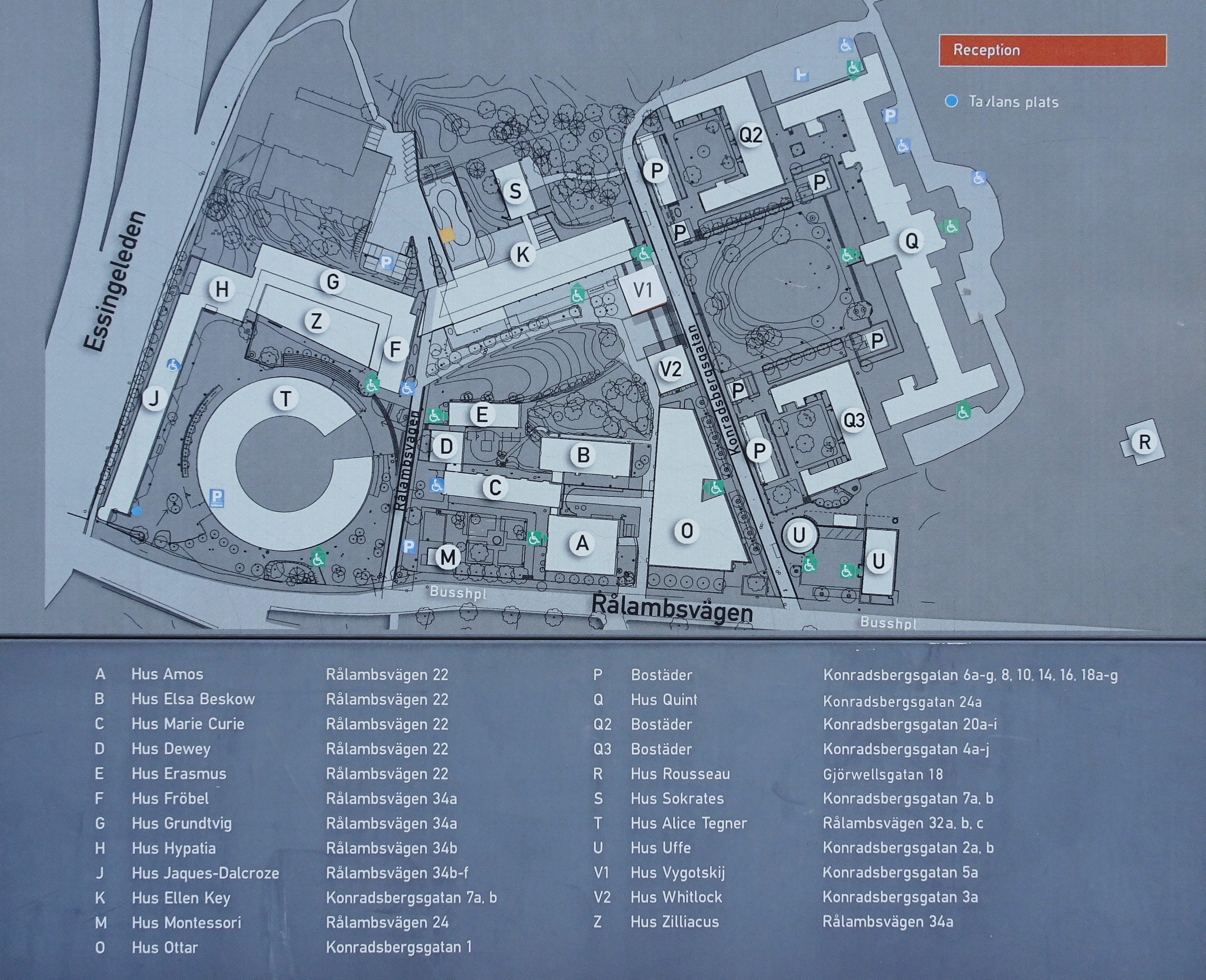
Campus Konradsberg information board.

Campus Konradsberg is a 62,000-square-metre (670,000 sq ft) campus located by Rålambsvägen on Kungsholmen in the district Marieberg in Stockholm. The buildings on Campus Konradsberg is owned and managed by Skolfastigheter i Stockholm AB.

== Background ==
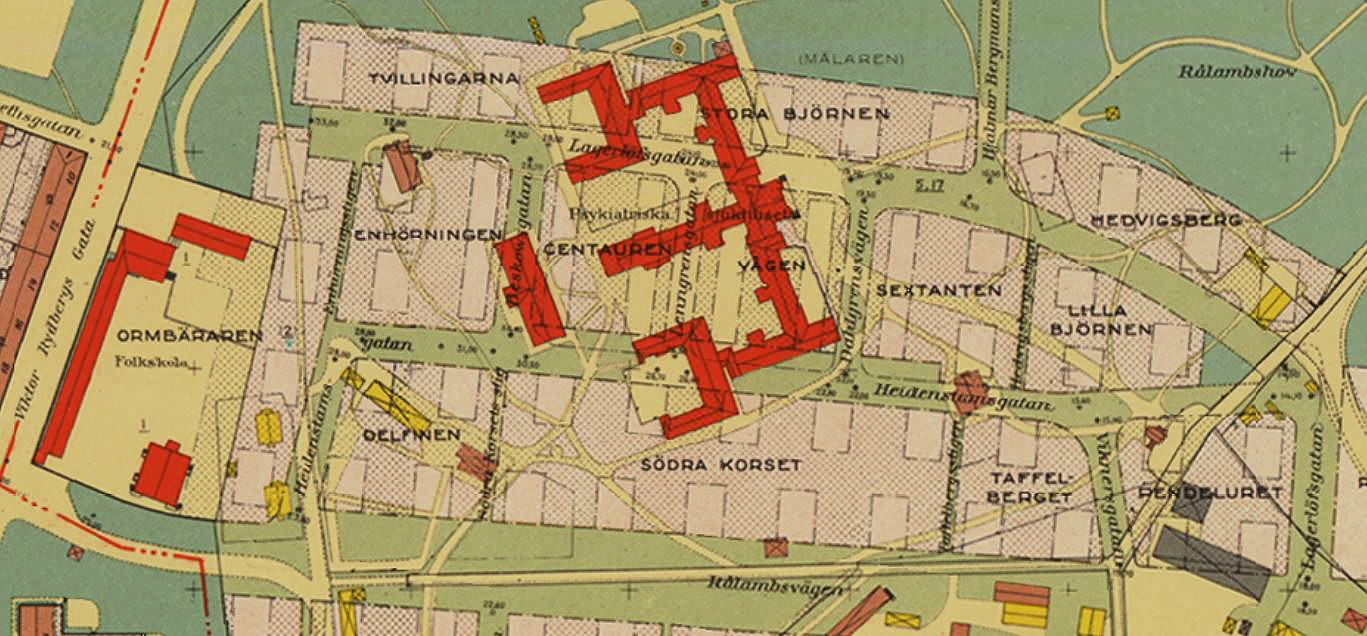
The Konradsberg area with plans of new streets and blocks, 1940.

Campus Konradsberg is named after the psychiatric hospital Konradsberg which was erected 1855–1871 based on plans by the architect Albert Törnqvist and is thereby the oldest building in the area. Fredhälls folkskola, drawn by Paul Hedqvist, is located to the far left on Campus Konradsberg and was inaugurated in 1938. In the 1950s, additional school buildings were added to the elementary school. Konradsberg was used for psychiatric care until 1995.

Plans to demolish the hospital buildings were already made in the 1940s. Only the elementary school would remain; the rest including the entire Konradsberg park would be converted into residential blocks. A city plan from 1944 clearly shows how it was planned. North of the newly constructed Rålambsvägen, Heidenstamsgatan and Lagerlövsgatan stretched along the crossroads Beskowgatan, Lenngrensgatan, and Dahlgrensgatan. The streets were named after famous authors, just like in Fredhäll. The blocks were named after constellations such as Delfinen, Södra Korset, Tvillingarna and Stora Björnen, Lilla Björnen, Enhörningen, and Vågen. Hedvigsbergs malmgård, one of the historically valuable buildings, was demolished in the year 1943, while the rest was left standing.

== A campus is created ==
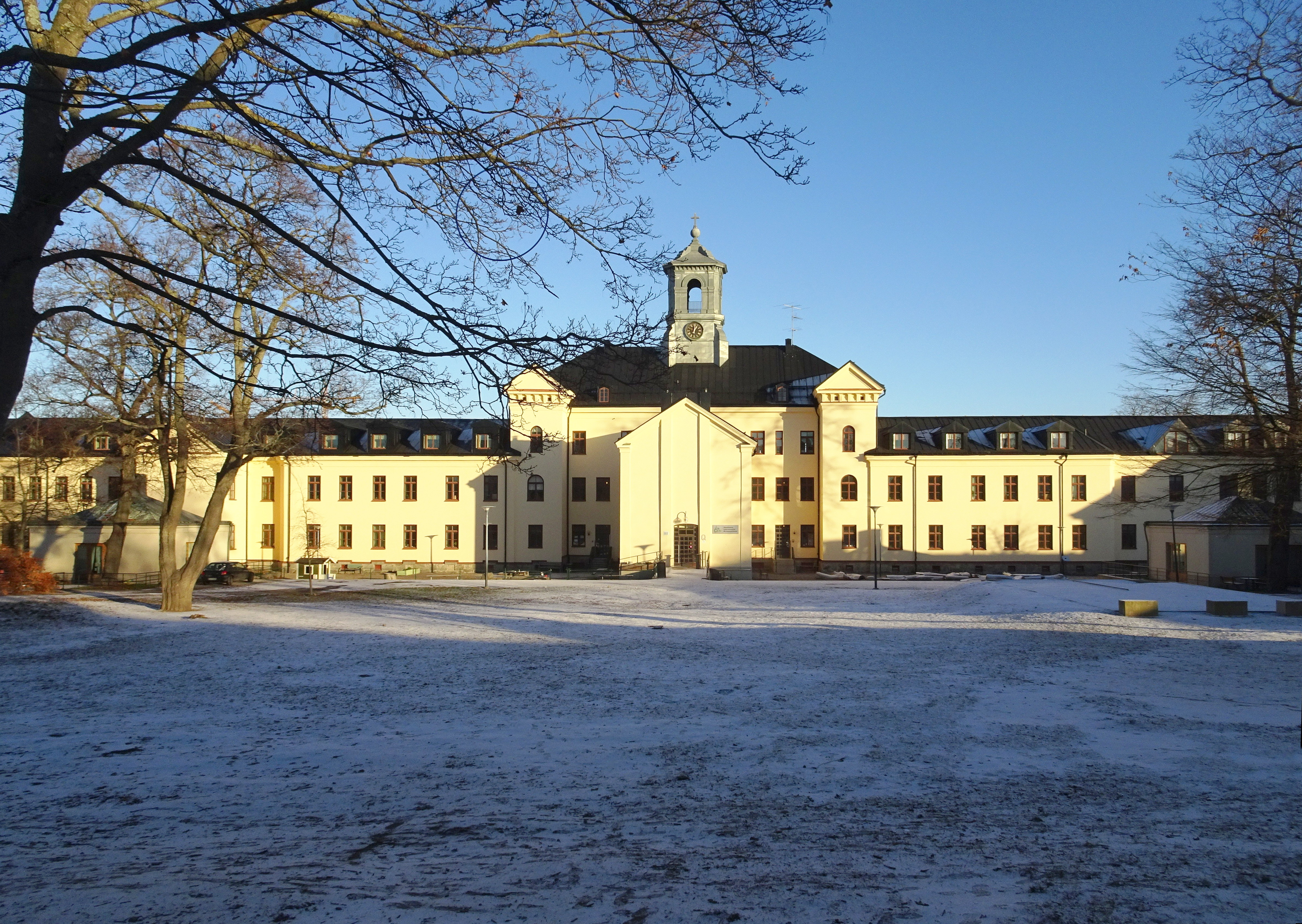
Konradsberg from the 1860s is the areas oldest building. Here lies Stockholms International Montessori School.

In 1999 a new detailed plan won legal force that preserved most of the historic buildings in the campus area and enabled extensive renovations and extensions. The area was then owned by Akademiska Hus, which rebuilt and expanded the buildings for the Stockholm Institute of Education. Among the architects who were employed were Brunnberg & Forshed arkitektkontor and Johan Celsings. In 2003, the School of Education moved into the area, which in addition to educational premises also provided a sports facility, called Rörelsecentrum (today Konradsbergs idrottshall). A total of 23 houses were prepared which are named after famous authors, psychologists, educators and philosophers, such as "House B" (Elsa Beskow), "House C" (Marie Curie), "House F" (Friedrich Fröbel), "House G" (Nikolaj Frederik Severin Grundtvig), "House J" (Émile Jaques-Dalcroze), "House O" (Elise Ottesen-Jensen) "House R" (Jean-Jacques Rousseau), "House S" (Sokrates), "House Q" (Stina Quint), and "House Z" (Laurin Zilliacus).

Only a few years after the move, Stockholm University decided that the College of Teachers would be integrated into the university's other activities at Frescati and the premises at Campus Konradsberg were therefore submitted step by step. Akademiska Hus then chose to develop the Campus Konradsberg into a school campus for schools with special qualification. An agreement was signed with the National Agency for Special Needs Education and Schools (Specialpedagogiska skolmyndigheten) and several special schools moved here, including Manillaskolan, Hällsboskolan, and Stockholm International Montessori School. The latter moved into Konradsberg's old main building. After changing to a school campus, about 3,000 children and young adults from preschool to high school receive their schooling here. Akademiska Hus Campus sold Konradsberg to Skolfastigheter i Stockholm AB (SISAB) in 2014.

The property value exceeded 2 billion SEK.

== Pictures, buildings ==
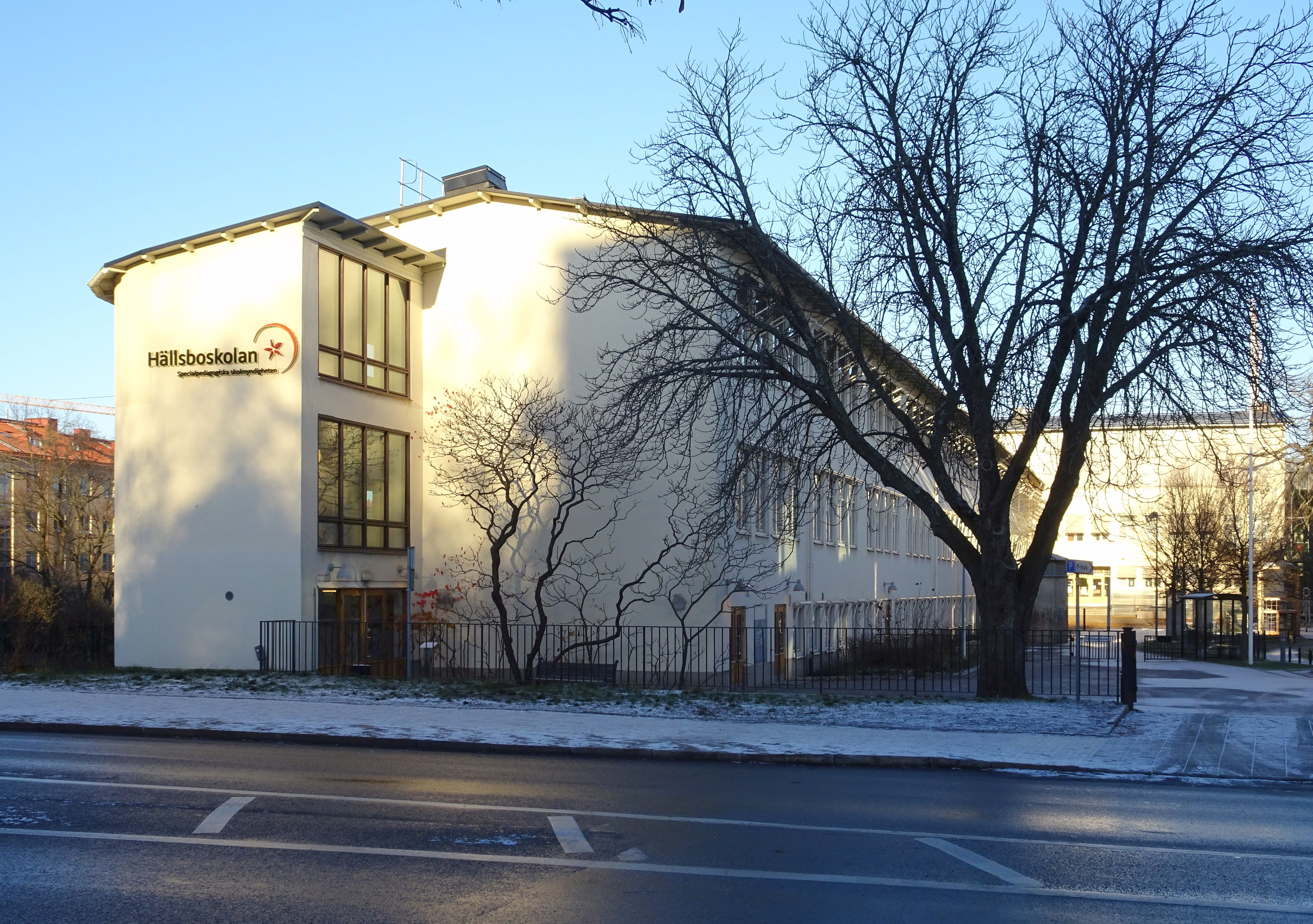
Hällsboskolan, Stockholm
(House J)

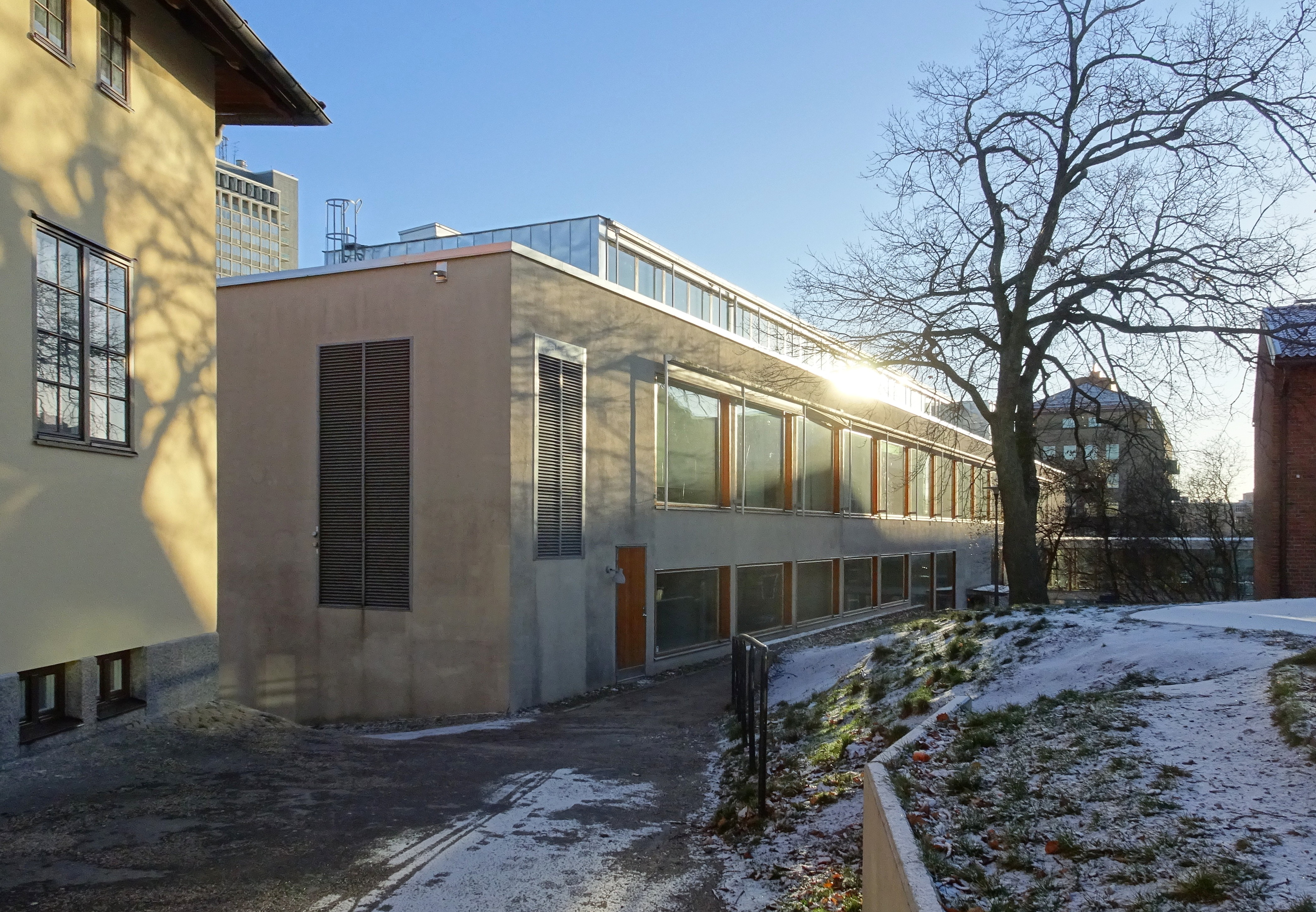
Kungsholmen's west gymnasium
(House O)

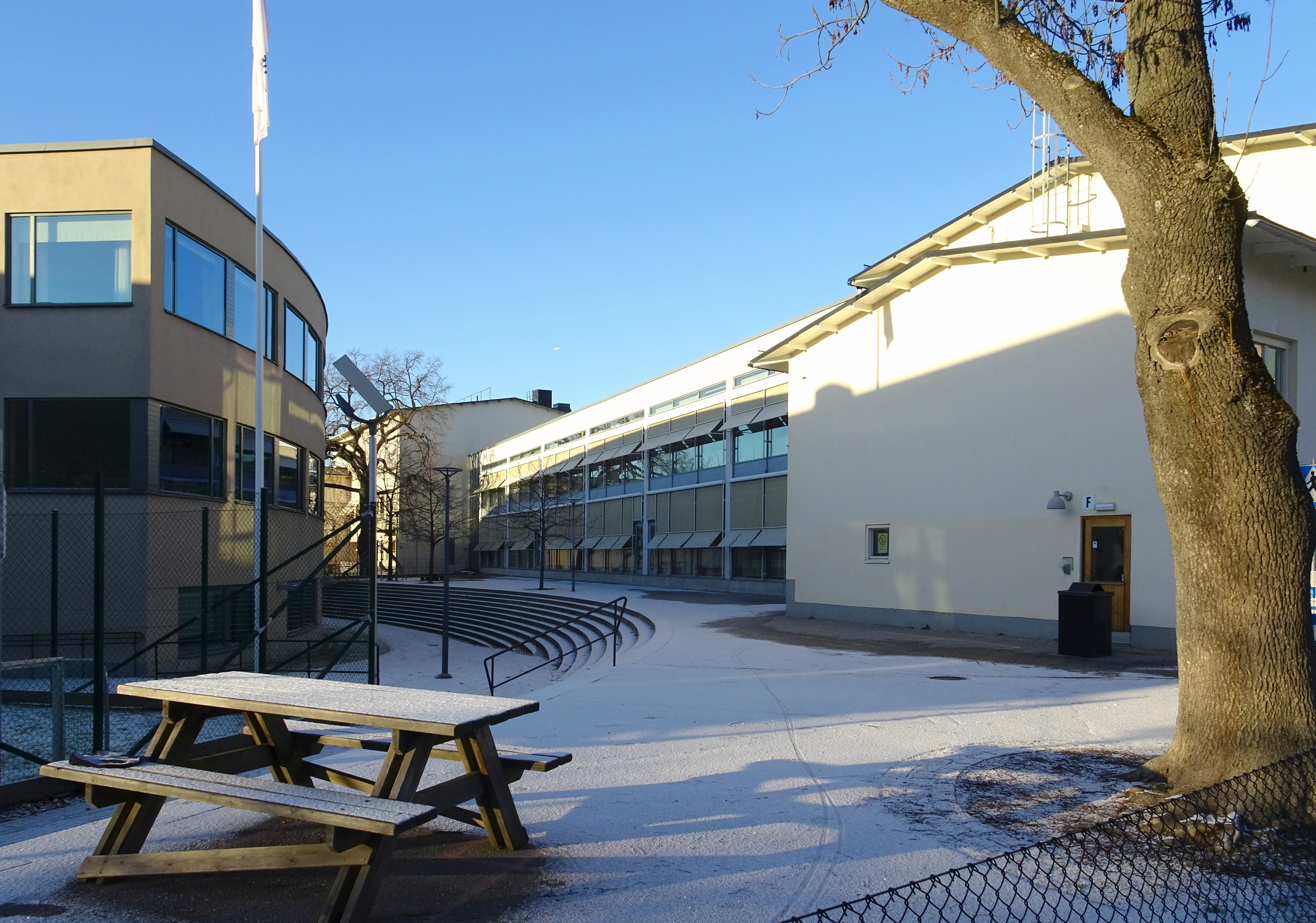
Kungsholmen's west gymnasium
(House F, G, and Z)

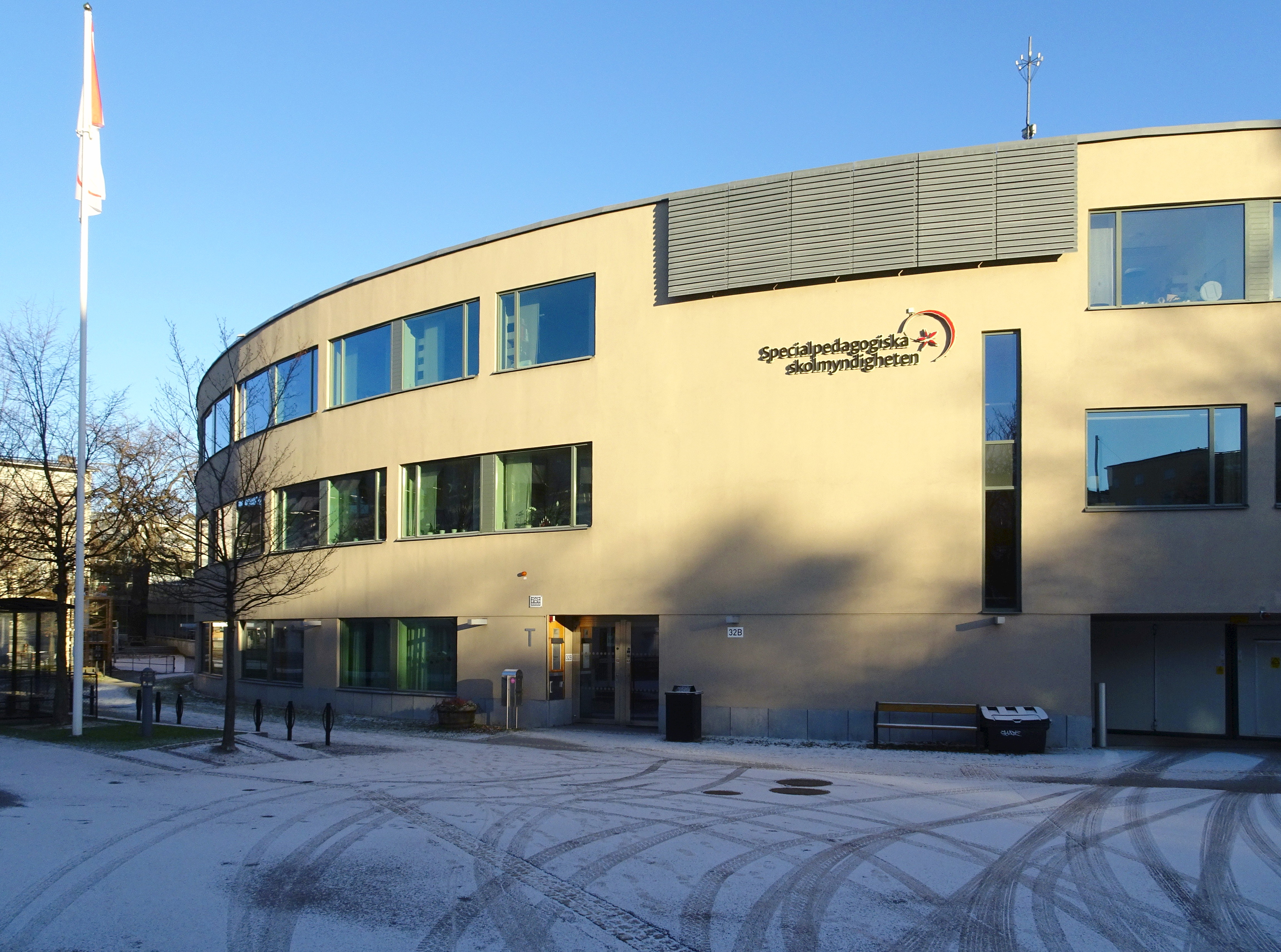
Manillaskolan
(House T)

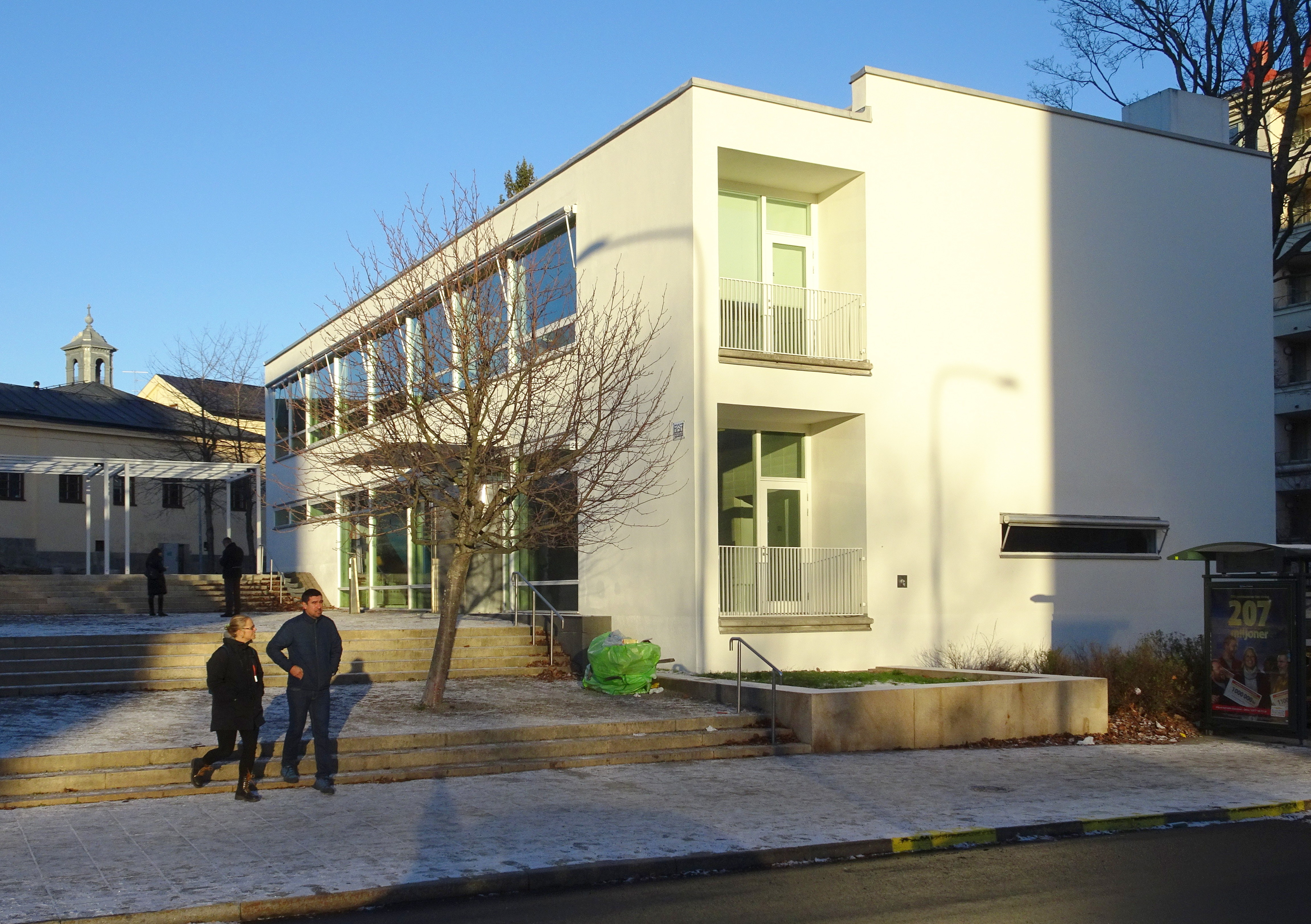
Konradsbergs idrottshall
(House U)
