= Albert Törnqvist =

Henrik Albert Törnqvist
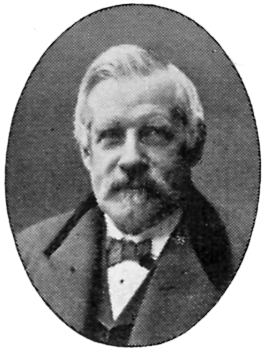
- Born: January 7, 1819; Stockholm
- Died: August 25, 1898 (aged 79)
- Occupation: Architect
- Board member of: Royal Swedish Academy of Fine Arts

Henrik Albert Törnqvist (January 7, 1819 – August 25, 1898) was a Swedish architect.

Törnqvist was born in Stockholm and studied at the Royal Institute of Technology and Royal Swedish Academy of Fine Arts. He won the royal medal and received a traveling grant 1845–1851. During these years he visited France, Italy, Turkey, Anatolia, Egypt, and Nubia. In 1853, Törnqvist was selected to become a member of the Royal Swedish Academy of Fine Arts. He became vice professor in 1860.

== Works ==
=== Civil buildings ===
- Kondradsbergs hospital
- Rebuilding Kastenhof to Hotel Rydberg
- Rebuilding and extending Westmanska Palatset
- Ateljébyggnaden by Kungsträdgården
- Centralpostkontoret by Rödbodtorget (later rebuilt, demolished 1969-1970)
- Djurgårdsteatern
- Uppsala University Hospital, 1867

=== Churches ===
- Alböke Church
- Holmby Church
- Skånings-Åsaka Church
- Båraryds Church
- Högby Church, Östergötland
- Tiveds Church
- Fivelstads Church
- Hörröds Church
- Töreboda Church
- Frillesås Church
- Ingelstorps Church
- Ucklums Church
- Fågelö Chapel
- Karlstads Cathedral
- Värnamo Church
- Gistads Church
- Korpilombolo Church
- Western Eds Church
- Hannäs Church
- Knäreds Church
- Västra Fågelviks Church
- Hassle Church
- Lane-Ryrs Church
- Västra Ryds Church, Östergötland
- Hinneryds Church
- Loshults Church
- Österplana Church
- Hjälmseryds Church
- Skallsjö Church
