= Alfhild Tamm =

Swedish physician (1876-1959)

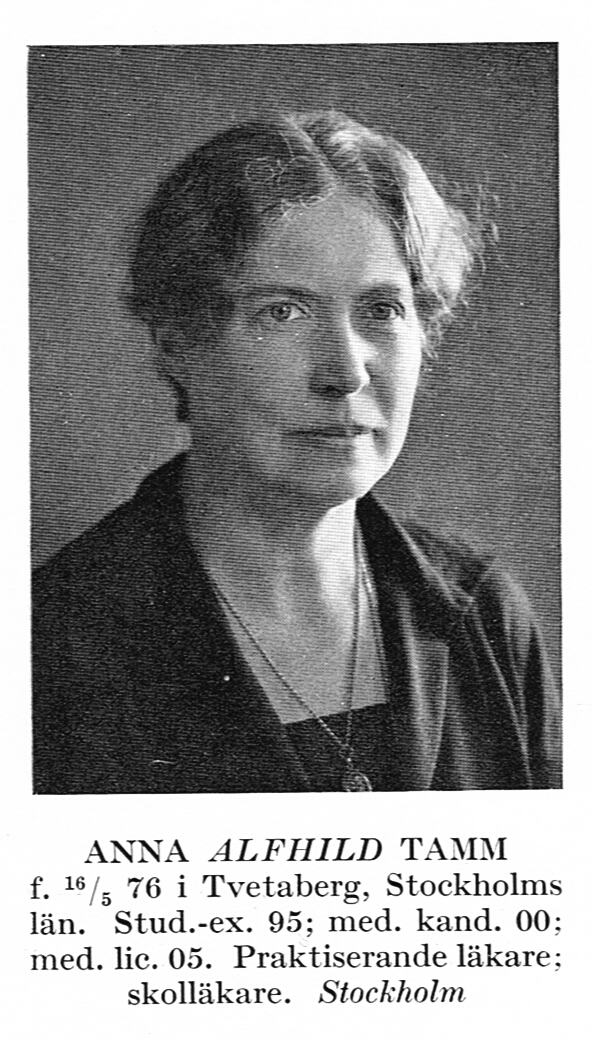
Alfhild Tamm

Anna Alfhild Tamm (16 May 1876 – 1 November 1959), was a Swedish physician and the first female psychiatrist in Sweden. She helped introduce psychoanalysis to Scandinavia and was an advocate for treating children's speech and learning difficulties.

== Biography ==
Tamm was born in Tveta to wealthy parents, and was educated with her four siblings by governesses. She graduated from Åhlinska skolan Stockholm in 1895 and acquired her medical license at the Karolinska Institute in 1905. She worked with Bror Gadelius, a prominent psychiatrist, in her early career. She held positions at Serafimerlasarettet, Konradsberg Hospital, and Kristinehamn Hospital, but her applications for a position as a fulltime psychiatrist were rejected due to her gender. Years later, she was awarded an honorary doctorate in 1951.

Tamm opened a private practice in Stockholm after travelling to Berlin in 1909 to study psychiatry, neurology and speech pathology. She also visited Vienna on numerous occasions to study psychoanalysis with Helene Deutsch and Paul Federn. She was a student of Sigmund Freud and was among those to introduce psychoanalysis in Sweden; together with Freud she founded the Finnish-Swedish Psychoanalytical Society in 1934 in Stockholm, under the auspices of the International Psychoanalytical Association (IPA), and was its chair from 1934 to 1947. She argued that it was important to include teachers in the psychological needs of children and that teachers should be eligible for training in psychoanalysis alongside doctors.

Tamm had a special interest in speech disorders, which was the main focus of her private practice, and helped to establish paediatric speech disorders as a clinical specialty. She worked as a school doctor and wrote articles on speech impediments and learning difficulties for journals including Acta Paediatrica. In 1938, she was a co-founder of the Swedish Association for Voice and Speech Therapy.

Tamm lived with her partner, the speech therapist and psychoanalyst Armgart von Leth. She died in 1959, leaving much of her estate to von Leth.

== Sources ==
- Tamm, Anna Alfhild i Alfred Levertin, Svenskt porträttgalleri (1911), volym XIII. Läkarekåren
- Svenska män och kvinnor, band 7 (1954)
- Svensk uppslagsbok, band 28 (1954)
