= Deafness in Portugal =

Deafness in Portugal involves several elements such as the history, education, community, and medical treatment that must be understood to grasp the experiences of deaf and hard-of-hearing (DHH) individuals in this region. Currently there are 60,000 people in Portugal that are deaf sign language users. Among that number are 100 working sign language interpreters. Currently, the form of sign language used in Portugal is Portuguese Sign Language (Portuguese: Língua Gestual Portuguesa, LGP). In Portugal, the cities Lisbon and Porto have the largest deaf populations.

== History ==
The deaf-and-hard-of-hearing (DHH) community in Portugal has had to overcome adversity as the history of their community was not easy but continues to evolve toward to a place of equality. In Portugal, Christianity has had a strong influence in the region, so in the 15th century, the deaf were seen as inhuman because they were possessed by demons and were avoided at all costs due to old religious viewpoints. This perspective continued until Portugal started to see some progress in the year 1823 after Swedish professor Pär Aron Borg organized the first school for the deaf in Casa Pia of Lisbon. This milestone resulted in the formation of Portuguese Sign Language, which was heavily influenced by Swedish Sign Language mainly through its use of the manual alphabet. In 1880 at the Milan Conference, the DHH community took several steps back due to the debate over oralism, which began to rise in popularity. This enforced the ideology that oral language was the only valid form of communication. The DHH community of Portugal was not accepted into greater society, as their language was not recognized by the hearing. Starting in 1997, this shifted because on September 20 the constitution was revised and in Article 74, Portuguese Sign Language was officially and legally recognized as a language. In the constitution, it reads "In the implementation of its policy for education, it is the duty of the State: To protect and value the Portuguese Sign Language as cultural expression and instrument of access to education and equality of opportunities". Once LGP was officially acknowledged, it opened greater access to information in the DHH community. An example of this is on March 19, 1999, when the government funded a project that created subtitling on public television. Due to the fact that this subtitling used a teletext page, it also created many jobs for deaf people as interpreters. As political officials began to employ interpreters, they became recognized and regulated by law on July 5, 1999.

== Education ==
The first deaf school was founded in 1823, where Borg focused his program on teaching writing skills along with the sign alphabet in an integrated method. This system was used until 1860 when the school closed. A decade later in 1870, more deaf schools were founded in Lisbon, Guimarães and Porto. These new schools followed the same approach, which lead to even greater results because more DHH students were able to be educated due to the increase in schools. The oralism wave of the 1880s made education for the DHH community extremely difficult. The Milan congress prohibited any use of LGP in 1893. At this time DHH students were forced into mainstream schools with no interpreters or aid and expected to learn by reading lips. In the same year even the school for the Deaf-Mute of Porto was forced to replace their sign method of teaching with an oralist method. Oralist teaching methods continued for the greater part of the century. In 1960, investigator William Stokoe pioneered a form of LGP with grammatical rules similar to oral languages. Misunderstanding was a major factor that deterred hearing people from sign language because they thought it was weird. This new ability to relate it one's primary language sparked steps for LGP to be reintegrated with the Portuguese schooling system. When Portuguese Sign Language became a certified language in 1997, oralist teaching methods were eliminated and it brought about serious improvements in the education system for DHH students. In 1999, interpreter certification became readily available with official requirements and a code of ethics, including training in sign language and completing a university interpreting program to provide proper support to DHH students. In the 1990s, the Portuguese education system introduced the bilingual model to support deaf students in preschool, primary and middle school. With this model Portuguese Sign Language would be taught as the primary language and oral language would be secondary. In the present day, most DHH students attend public schools, but some DHH students enroll in deaf-only schools. Mainstream schools integrate DHH students into hearing classrooms or provide separate assistance where an interpreter may be provided. When it comes to higher education, universities and colleges are slowly becoming more accessible to DHH students.

== Community ==
Because members of the DHH community have experienced prejudice and discrimination, their sense of community has developed into an unbreakable pride in their language and culture. The main goal for DHH people in Portugal is to educate hearing people on the difficulties deaf people face along with inequalities placed on them. In order to achieve this DHH communities all around Portugal plan several national events along with marches that propose ideas on how to progress and make the deaf population more active. The events held have a repeating theme of "Deaf People Looking into the Future". Associação Portugesa de Surdos was the first organization for deaf people in Portugal founded in 1958. Deaf communities in Portugal are very active in politics. Associação Portugesa de Surdos were the people who took the first initiative to achieve official recognition of Portuguese Sign Language. The leading deaf organization is Federação Portuguesa das Associações de Surdos (FPAS), which strives to advance the rights of the Portuguese DHH community. They also contribute to one of the eleven associations of the European Union of the Deaf and the World Federation of the Deaf. The rights of the DHH community have come a long way; however, there is still much work that needs to be done. The DHH community expresses that there is a necessity for educational tools of all kinds, DHH people being represented and taking official positions in politics and government, and more hearing people learning sign language.

== Health care access ==
In Portugal, there is an emphasis on early hearing screening. Infants are encouraged to be screened before leaving the hospital, and no later than turning one month old. If the outcome of the hearing screening comes back as indefinite, the infant will receive further hearing evaluations. The urgency for early diagnosis in hearing loss is partly due to wanting to use cochlear implants in children. Even though hearing screening is most popular in babies, older children and adults can undergo the same testing later in life. With advancing technology, Portugal is looking to integrate a bidirectional translator of LGP into medical treatment. This would allow for real-time translation of Portuguese Sign Language to text with around 90% accuracy.
