= Carl Oscar Malm =

Finnish educator, founder of Finnish Sign Language

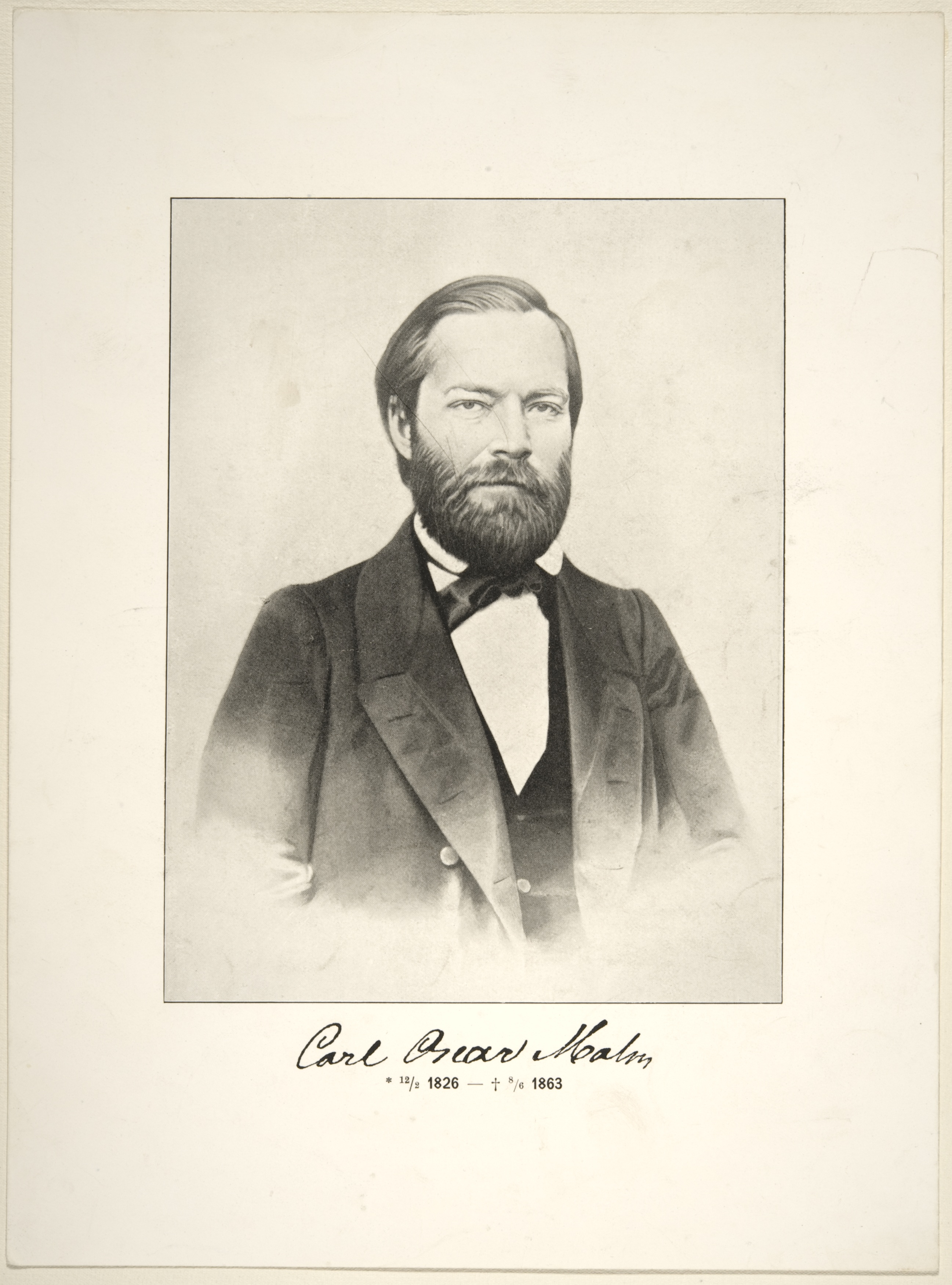
- Illustration of Carl Oscar Malm, 1864
- Born: 12 February 1826; Eura, Grand Duchy of Finland, Russian Empire
- Died: 8 June 1863 (aged 37); Turku, Grand Duchy of Finland, Russian Empire
- Monuments: Bust in Porvoo
- Education: Manillaskolan, Stockholm, Sweden
- Known for: Finland's first teacher of the deaf, founder of the first deaf school in Finland, father of Finnish Sign Language

Carl Oscar Malm, also known as C. O. Malm and Carl Oskar Malm (12 February 1826 – 8 June 1863) was Finland's first teacher of the deaf, founder of the first school for the deaf in the country, and the father of Finnish Sign Language.

== Life ==
=== Upbringing and education ===
Malm was born on 12 January 1826 in Eura, Finland, to a well-off and educated family. His parents were Anders Gustaf Malm, a military officer and city treasurer, and Katarina Juliana Tandefelt. Malm was deaf either from birth or a very young age. In 1834, his parents sent him at eight years of age to Institutet för dövstumma och blinda, Manillaskolan ('the Institute for the deaf-mute and blind', 'the Manilla School') in Stockholm. There he learned Swedish Sign Language and was the private student of teacher Johan Gerhard Holtz. Two years later, Malm returned home having studied a number of subjects, learning written Swedish to an "unusually" high level, and becoming the school's top student. He would later learn to read Finnish, German, and French. Malm found an early passion for education. He was appointed assistant teacher at the school in 1843, gaining his first experience as an educator.

=== First schools for the deaf ===
In 1845, Malm went to Porvoo. He began tutoring two deaf boys, David Fredrik Hirn and Sten Sirén, in Koivisto in early 1846. Later that year, with the assistance and support of role model Ossian Edmund Borg, son of the founder of the Manilla School, Malm opened a private school for the deaf, with Hirn and Sirén being the first two students. The school was opened in his father's house at Kankurinkuja 5 and was the first school for the deaf in Finland. Malm knew there must be more potential deaf students, so he placed an advertisement for the school in the newspaper Borgå Tidning and later requested the Diocese of Porvoo to determine the number of deaf people in the country: 1,466, with 602 under the age of 20. In contrast to the oralism commonly used in deaf education at the time, his school focused primarily on sign language and written Swedish (see manualism). Lessons were initially taught in what would be the beginnings of Finnish Sign Language.

The school, being private, charged parents tuition. This was an obstacle for poor families, particularly since the Manilla School no longer accepted students from Finland. Malm fought for more support and his efforts were noted by Johan Vilhelm Snellman in the Swedish-language newspaper Saima. The school eventually attracted influential patrons, including priest and poet Johan Ludvig Runeberg and bishop and pioneering educator of the deaf Carl Henrik Alopaeus, who initiated a fundraising campaign for its benefit. After ten years of operation, the school received state support through a personal grant to Malm from the emperor. In 1859, it was taken over by the state. In 1858, the state planned to establish a school for the deaf in Turku, a more convenient location and home to more deaf people. Malm, Alopaeus, and some students followed; the school opened in 1860 with 22 students. Malm worked there as a teacher. He, his brother Gustaf Emil Malm, and Alopaeus had applied for the role of headmaster. Malm had a letter of recommendation from Borg at the school in Sweden. Alopaeus was chosen: he had the support of fellow provost and educator Henrik Heikel and educator Alexander Ferdinand Borenius and as a priest, he could provide religious education at the school as well. Alopaeus also had "perfect speech and hearing", a requirement which disqualified and marginalized Malm and which he struggled with.

The Turku school for the deaf was noted in an 1868 report by the United States Secretary of the Interior, who remarked on the focus on instruction in sign language and written text, unusual at the time. (These methods were to remain until the 1892 decree mandating oralism and lip reading.) It was also noted that education for the deaf existed in Finland for some time before such education was available in Washington, D.C.

The deaf school in Porvoo, the only one in Swedish-speaking Finland, was eventually closed in 1993 due to a lack of students.

=== Influence ===
His pioneering work in deaf education helped lead to the founding of a Swedish-language school for the deaf in Jakobstad by Henrik and Anna Heikel in 1861 and a Finnish-language school in Kuopio in 1862. As these separate-language schools were founded, the sign languages diverged into Finnish Sign Language and Finland-Swedish Sign Language.

=== Philanthropy ===
Malm and his brother Gustaf Emil's philanthropic mindset led them to found a people's library in Turku. Malm had an interest in photography and planned to open a photo studio in the 1860s, with which he would fund a number of social programs, including a bath house, sewing classes for poor women, and grants for Svenska fruntimmersskolan i Åbo, a girls' school.

=== Death ===
Malm died in Turku on 8 June 1863, at 37 years of age, due to pneumonia. His gravestone features a relief by deaf artist Karl Albert Tallroth. A bust (made by Juho Talvia) was erected in 1926 on the site where the school for the deaf had operated in Porvoo.

== See also ==
- Pär Aron Borg, pioneer of deaf education in Sweden and founder of the Manilla School
- History of institutions for deaf education
