= Manillaskolan =

Coordinates: 59°19′25″N 18°08′00″E

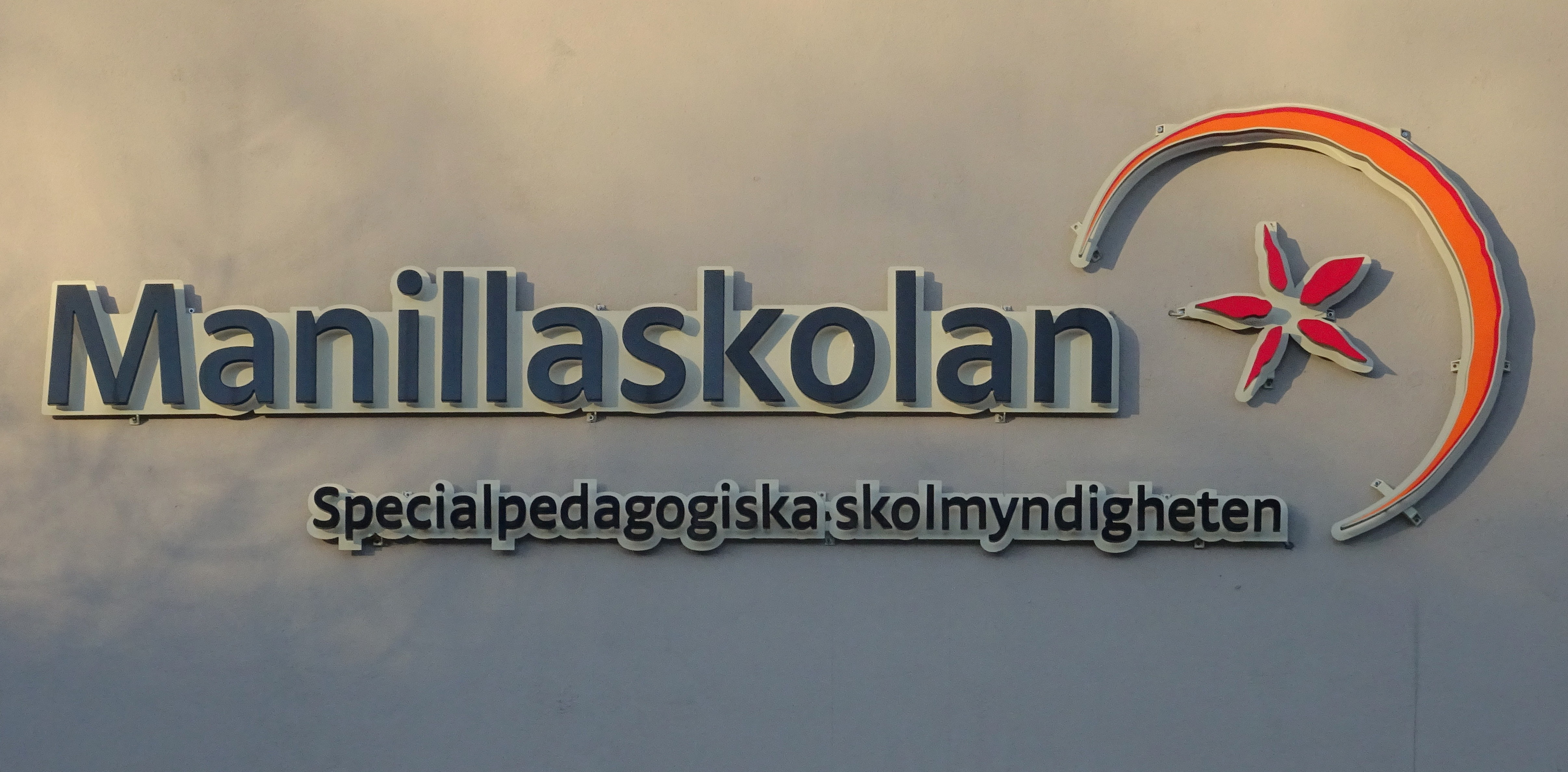

Location
- Stockholm; Sweden

Information
- Former name: Allmänna institutet för döva och blinda å Manilla
- Established: 1809
- Founder: Pär Aron Borg
- Website: www.spsm.se/Manillaskolan

Manillaskolan ('Manilla School'), before 1879 Allmänna institutet för döva och blinda å Manilla ('Public Institute for the Deaf and Blind at Manila'), is a Swedish state school for blind, deaf and hard of hearing children, founded by Pär Aron Borg in 1809. Until the autumn term 2013, the school was located at Djurgårdsvägen on Södra Djurgården in Stockholm. The school is now located in the former premises of the Stockholm Institute of Education in Konradsberg on Kungsholmen.

Manillaskolan is a state special education school run by the National Agency for Special Needs Education and Schools (Specialpedagogiska skolmyndigheten, SPSM). The school has been located on Kungsholmen in Stockholm since 2013 and should not be confused with the school Campus Manilla run by the foundation Carpe Scientia, which took over Manilla School's old premises on Djurgården in 2013.

== History ==
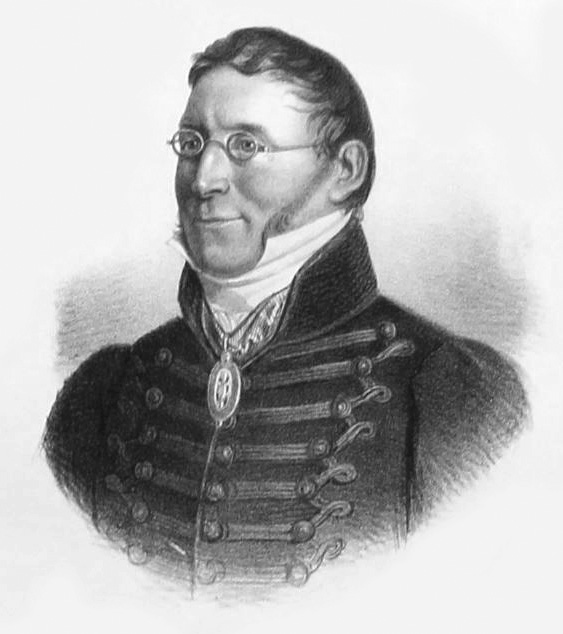
Founder Pär Aron Borg.

The name Manilla dates back to the time of Gustav III. In 1790, he transferred a piece of land here, on the southern shore of Södra Djurgården, to the Spanish envoy Ignacio María del Coral y Aguirre. Coral named the place Manilla after the capital of the Philippines, then a Spanish colony, and had a number of lavish buildings constructed based on designs by Louis Jean Desprez, who was also busy designing Gustav III's Stora Haga slott.

However, Coral was brought back to Spain shortly after the death of Gustav III and the grand building plans were only partially carried out. The area decayed for a period and was then divided into three parts; Upper Manila, Lower Manila and Manhem. At Manhem, Pär Aron Borg founded the Institutet för dövstumma och blinda ('Institute for the Deaf-mute and Blind') in 1817. From 1819, Manhem was the country's only deaf institution until the end of the 1850s. The work was carried out entirely on a non-profit basis. In 1889, legislation made the education of the deaf compulsory and in 1894 the institution at Upper Manila became the main centre of education and at the same time was given the name Manila Deaf-mute School.

In 2013, Manilla School moved its operations to Konradsberg on Kungsholmen. The premises at Manilla are now used by an independent primary school, Campus Manilla, run by the Carpe Scientia Foundation. The foundation also runs Fredrikshovs Slott School.

== Buildings ==
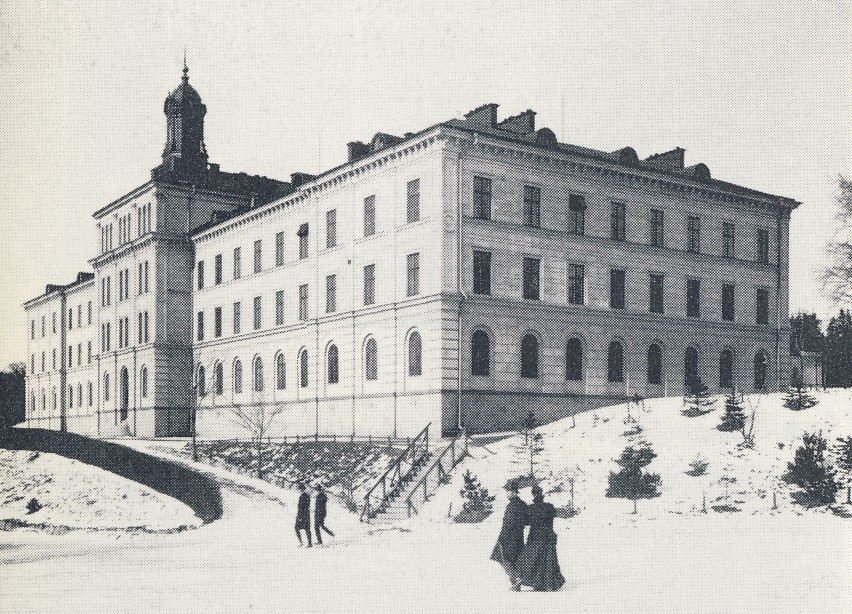
Manillaskolan before renovation, 1900.

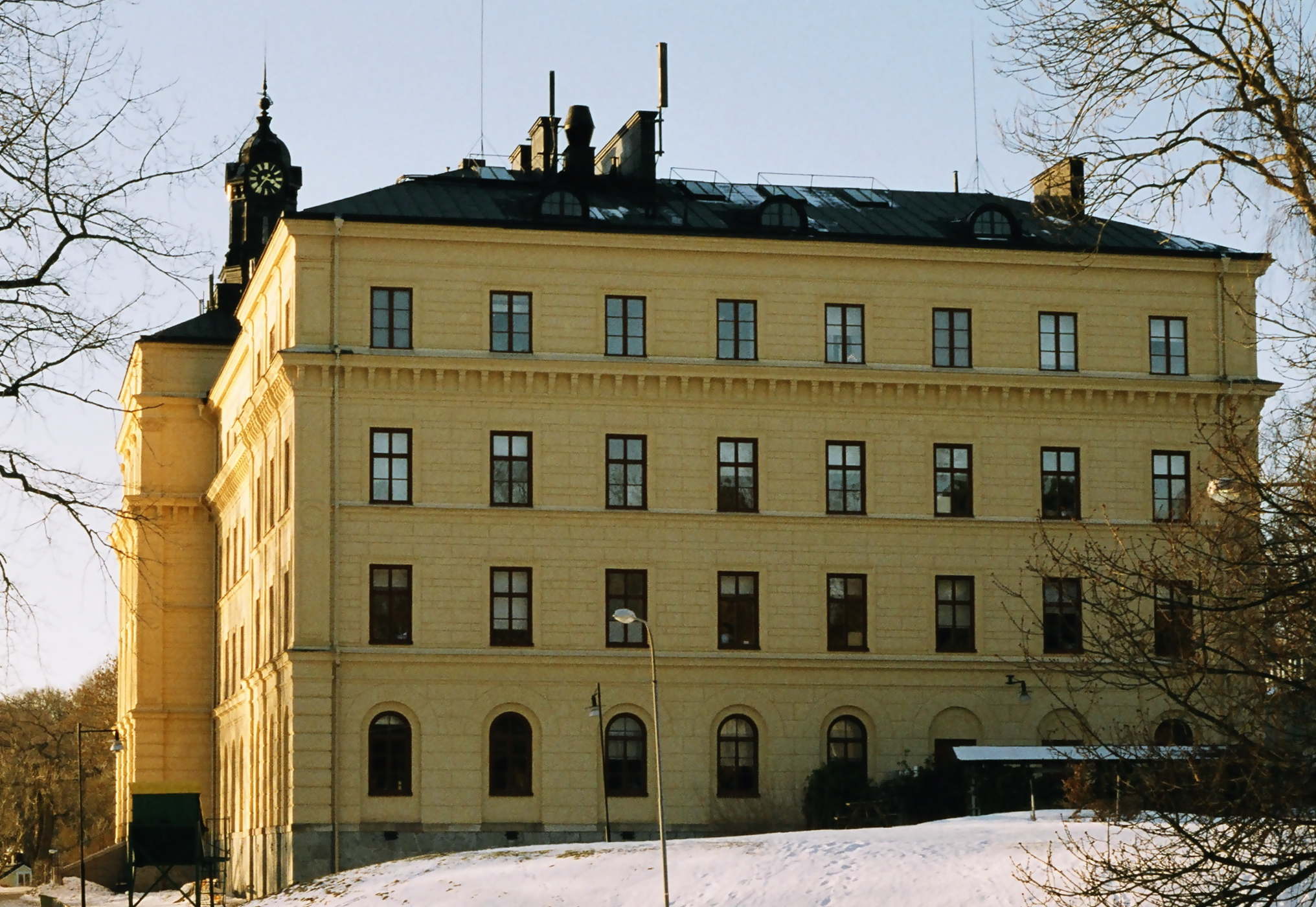
Manillaskolan from the east, 2011.

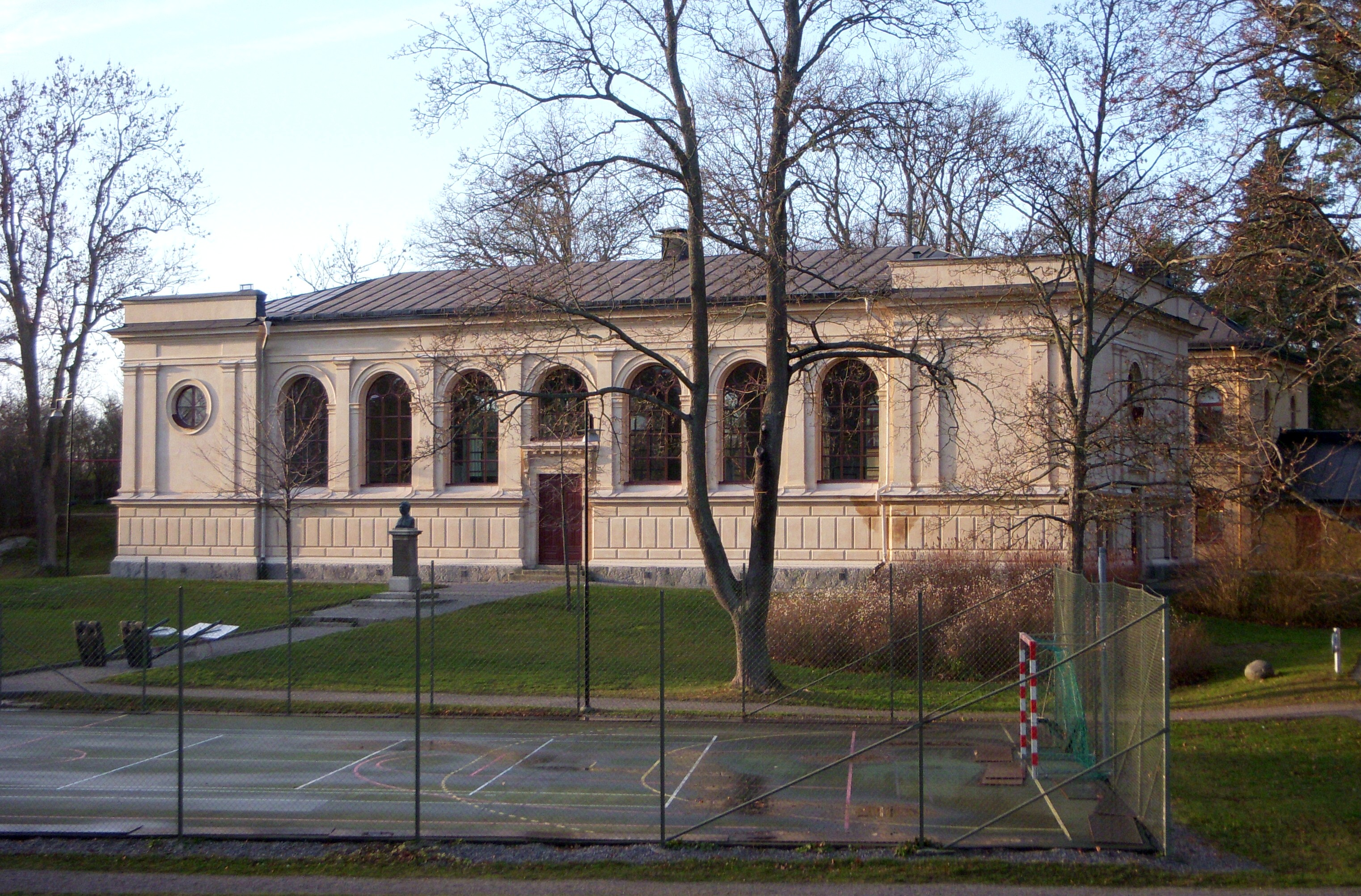
Gymnastics building from the east, 2011.

The current building on Upper Manila was completed in 1864 and the old Manhem was demolished in 1881. The large Renaissance Revival institutional building was designed by the architect Johan Adolf Hawerman. The complex was built as school rooms and a boarding school for both teachers and its 180 students. Boarding school activities ceased in 1979.

The high towered central building contains a church hall that extends over two floors, the stairwell has stairs and railings in richly decorated cast iron. In 1912 an additional storey was added to the schoolhouse. In 1938 Manilla became a state school and the school ceased to be a boarding school in 1979. The buildings have been renovated several times over the years. In 1998, a new building for drama education designed by Tallius-Myhrman Architects was inaugurated. In 1995–1996, a major internal renovation was carried out.

The gymnasium building to the north of the main building was designed by architect E. Jakobsson and opened in 1870. It is still used as a gymnasium. In front of the entrance to the gymnasium is a sculpture showing a bust of Pär Aron Borg. It was inaugurated in a ceremony on 4 July 1876. An inscription reads: "Founder of the first general institute for the deaf, dumb and blind in Sweden in 1809, in Portugal in 1823.

After the teaching of deaf and hard of hearing children moved from the premises in 2011, the buildings were rented to an independent primary school, Campus Manilla.

The buildings are owned and managed by the National Property Board of Sweden.

== Manillaskolan today ==
Manillaskolan is a bilingual school for children and young people who are deaf, hard of hearing or have cochlear implants. Around 100 pupils between the ages of six and seventeen are educated there every school year.

In 2013, Manilla School moved from its premises on Djurgården to Campus Konradsberg on Kungsholmen. The new school building was designed in 2004 by Brunnberg & Forshed Architects for the Stockholm Institute of Education with Akademiska Hus as the client.

Nya Manillaskolan

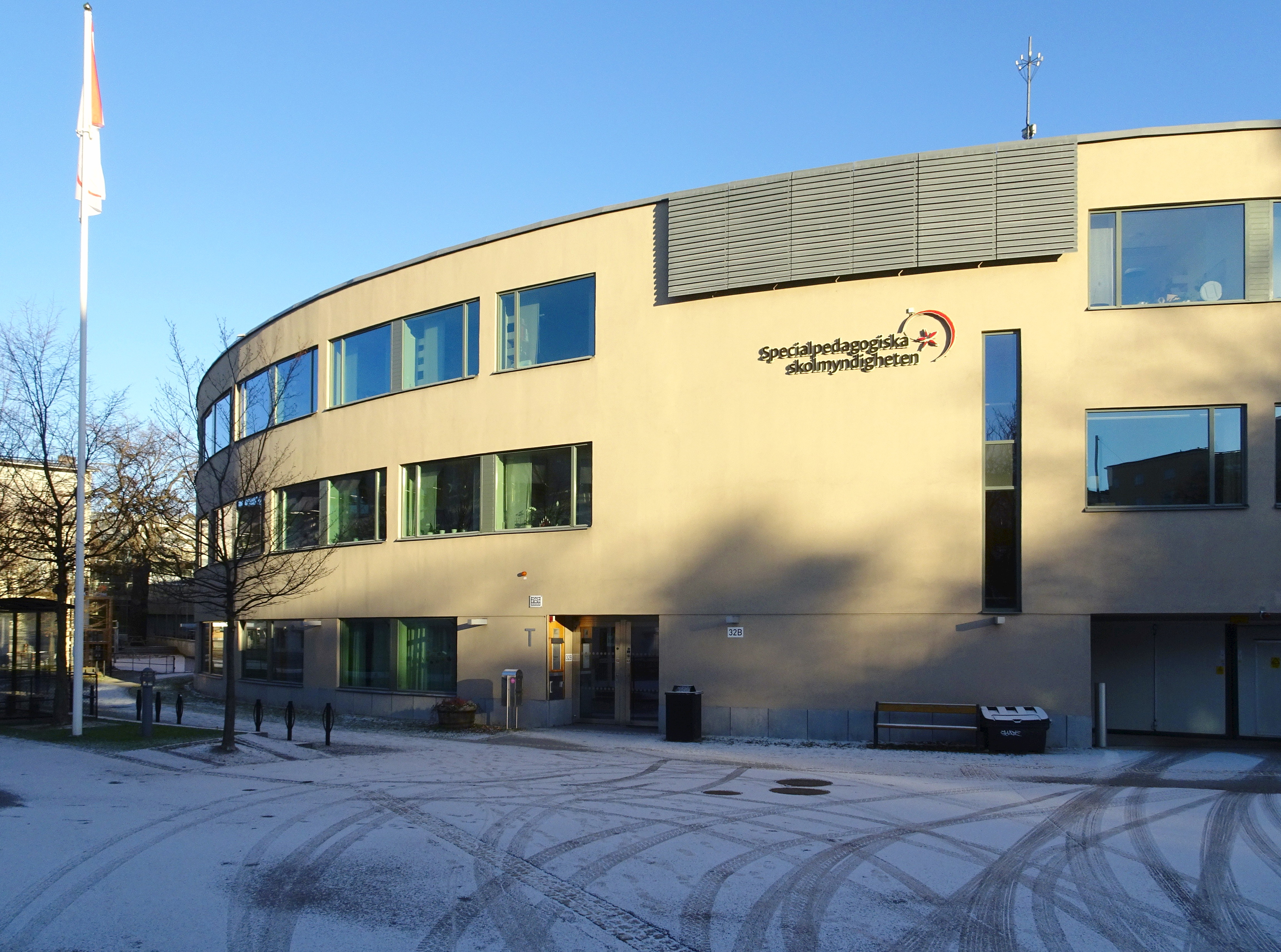

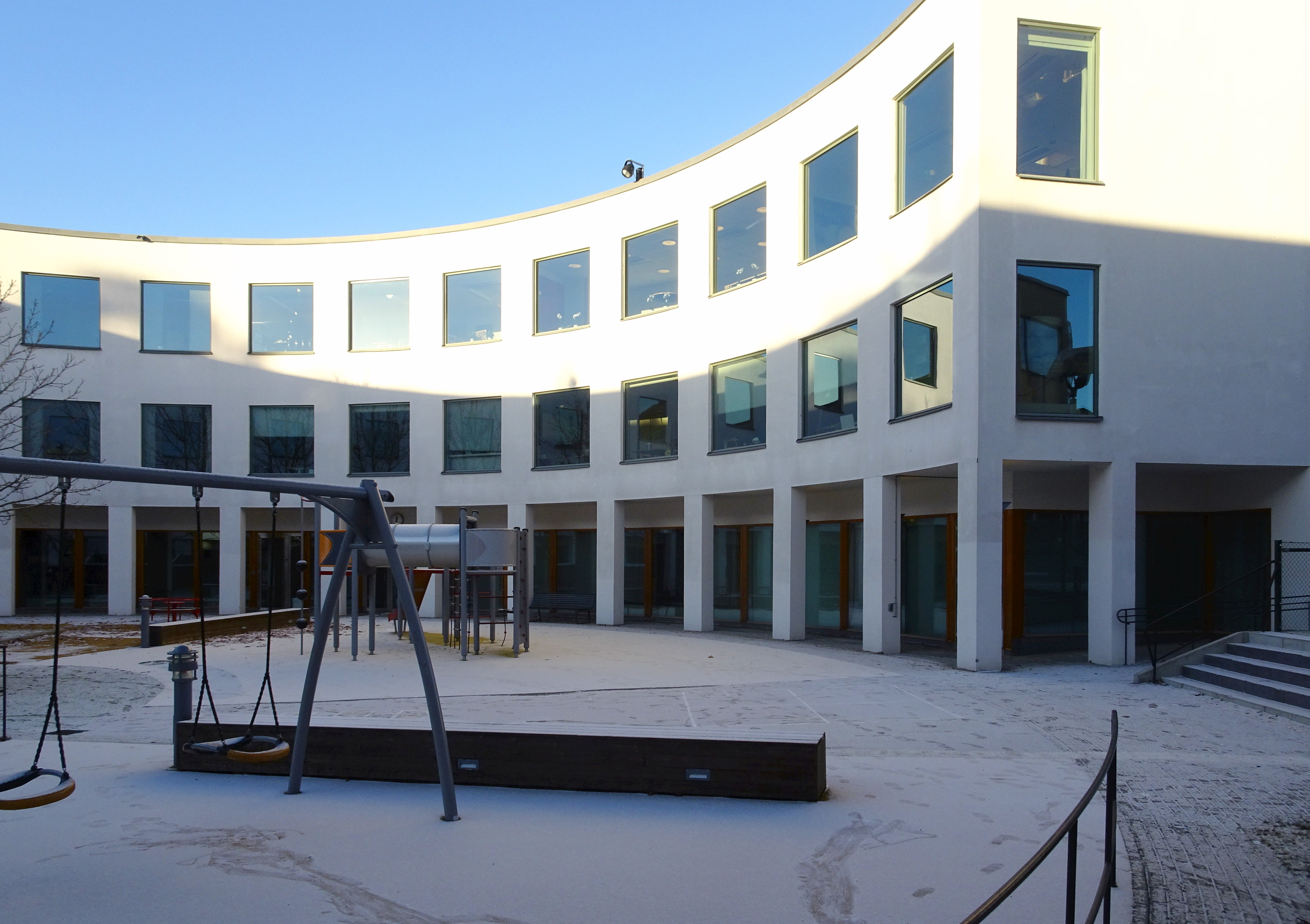

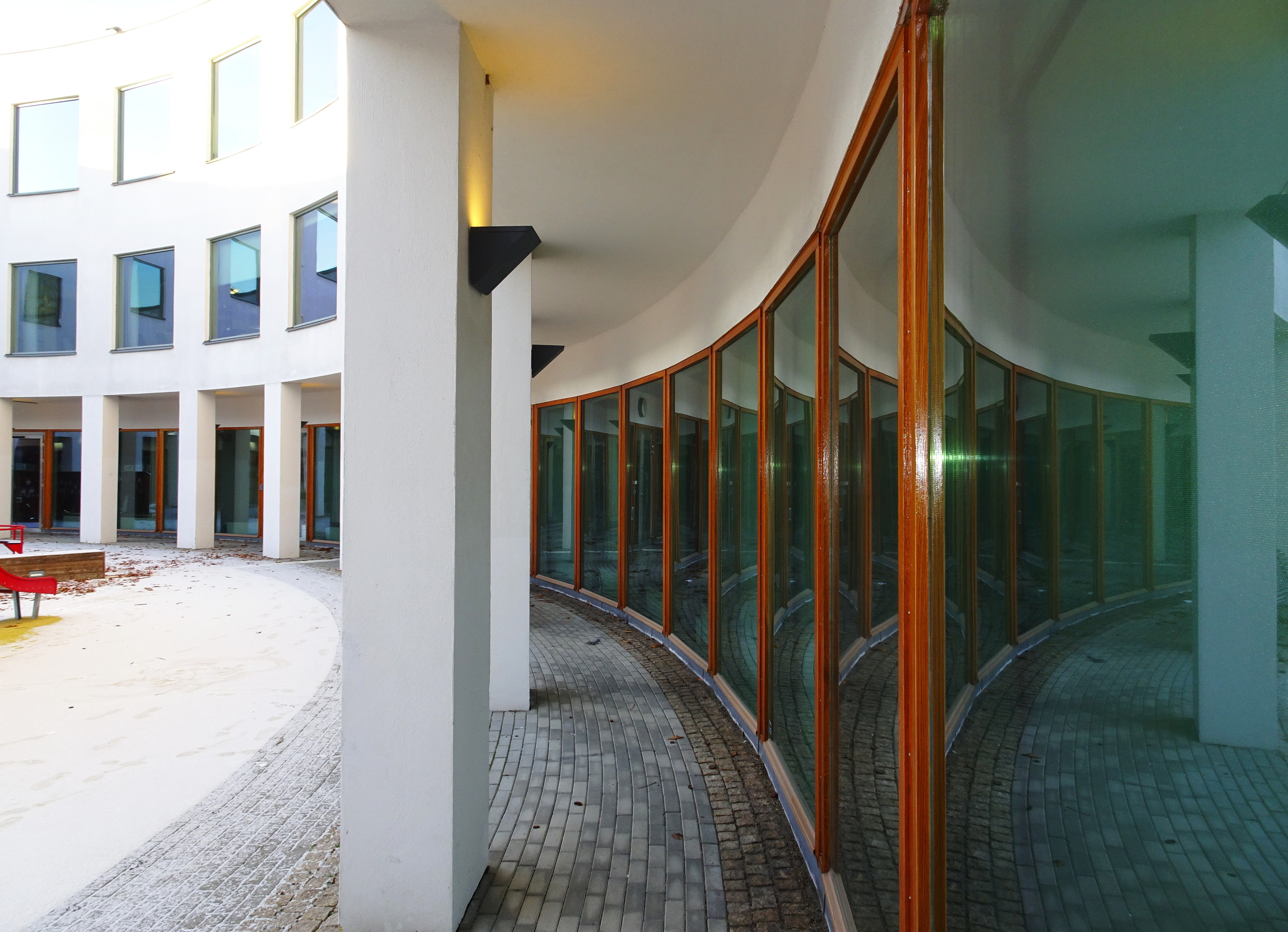

== Notable students ==
Carl Oscar Malm, the first Finnish educator of the deaf, founder of the first school for the deaf in Finland, and the father of Finnish Sign Language, attended Manillaskolan as a child. He later worked at the school as an assistant teacher before returning to Finland and founding a school for the deaf there with the assistance of Borg's son Ossian Edmund Borg.

== See also ==
- Tysta skolan
