= Carl Henrik Alopaeus =

Finnish bishop and educator (1825–1892)

Bishop Carl Henrik Alopaeus
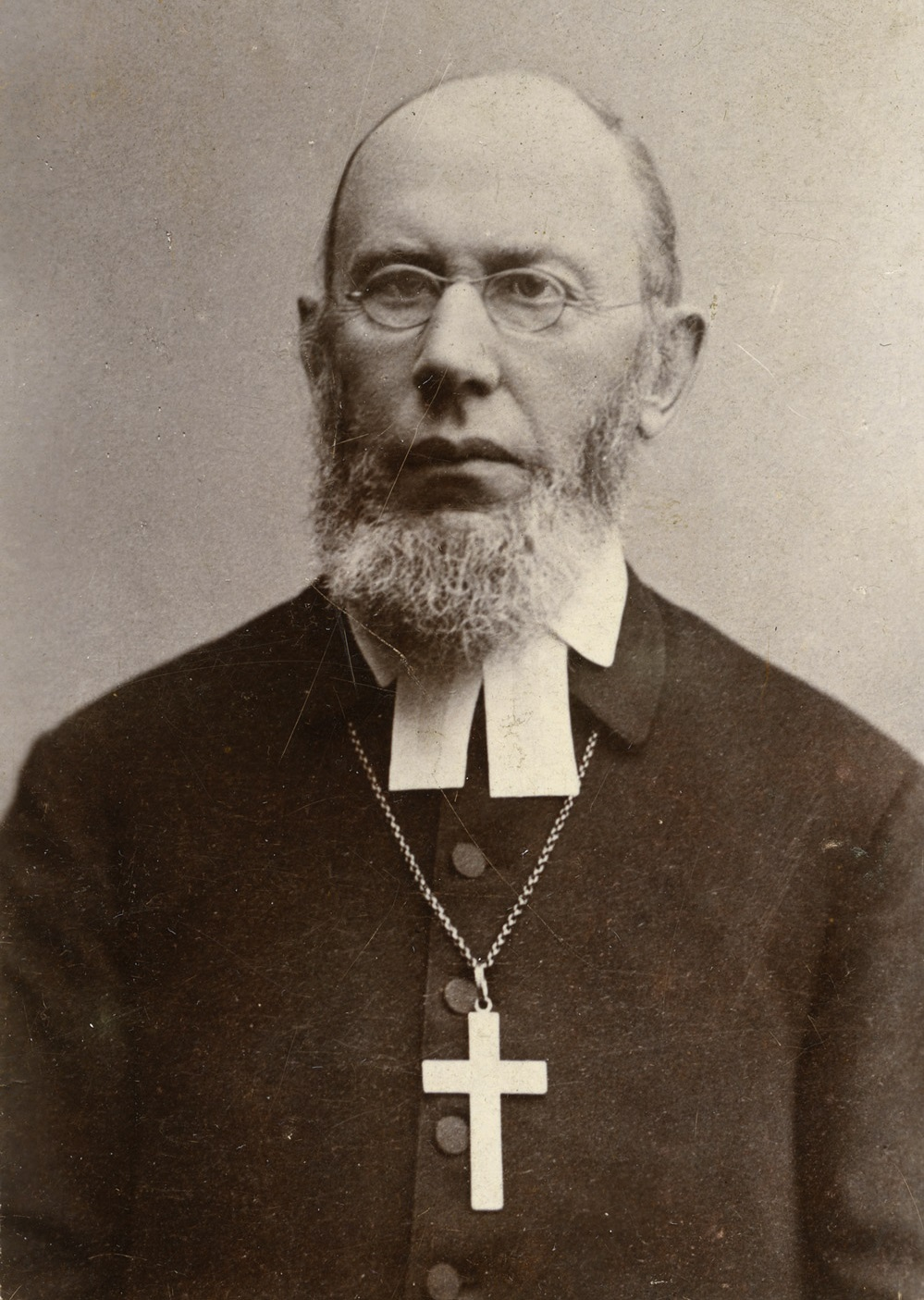
- Born: 5 April 1825; Juva, Grand Duchy of Finland, Russian Empire (present-day Finland)
- Died: 10 March 1892 (aged 66); Savonranta, Grand Duchy of Finland, Russian Empire
- Resting place: Porvoo, Finland
- Occupation(s): Bishop, educator

Carl Henrik Alopaeus (5 April 1825 – 10 March 1892) was a Finnish Lutheran bishop and educator, known as the "apostle to the Deaf" due to his work in deaf education.

== Upbringing and religious work ==
Alopaeus was born in Juva, Finland, in 1825 to David Alopaeus, a judge, and Henrietta Margareta Avelin. His education was in theology; he studied at the University of Helsinki. As a young man, he worked as a teacher in Porvoo, Finland. In 1855 he married Ida Amanda Nykopp and was ordained to the priesthood. Alopaeus became the dean of Porvoo in 1881 and was ordained bishop in 1885.

His entry in the National Biography of Finland (Suomen kansallisbiografia) describes his religious views, tolerant at a time when the Conventicle Act outlawed religious gatherings other than those of the state church until its abolition in 1870. It states: "Confessionally, Alopaeus was broad-minded and therefore did not want to condemn the activities of various 'sects', even if they risked attracting parishioners away from the Lutheran Church."

His work as a priest and bishop was intertwined with his work with the deaf; Alopaeus provided religious education and confirmation to the deaf around the country as well as working together with Bible societies to distribute Bibles to his students.

== Education for the deaf ==
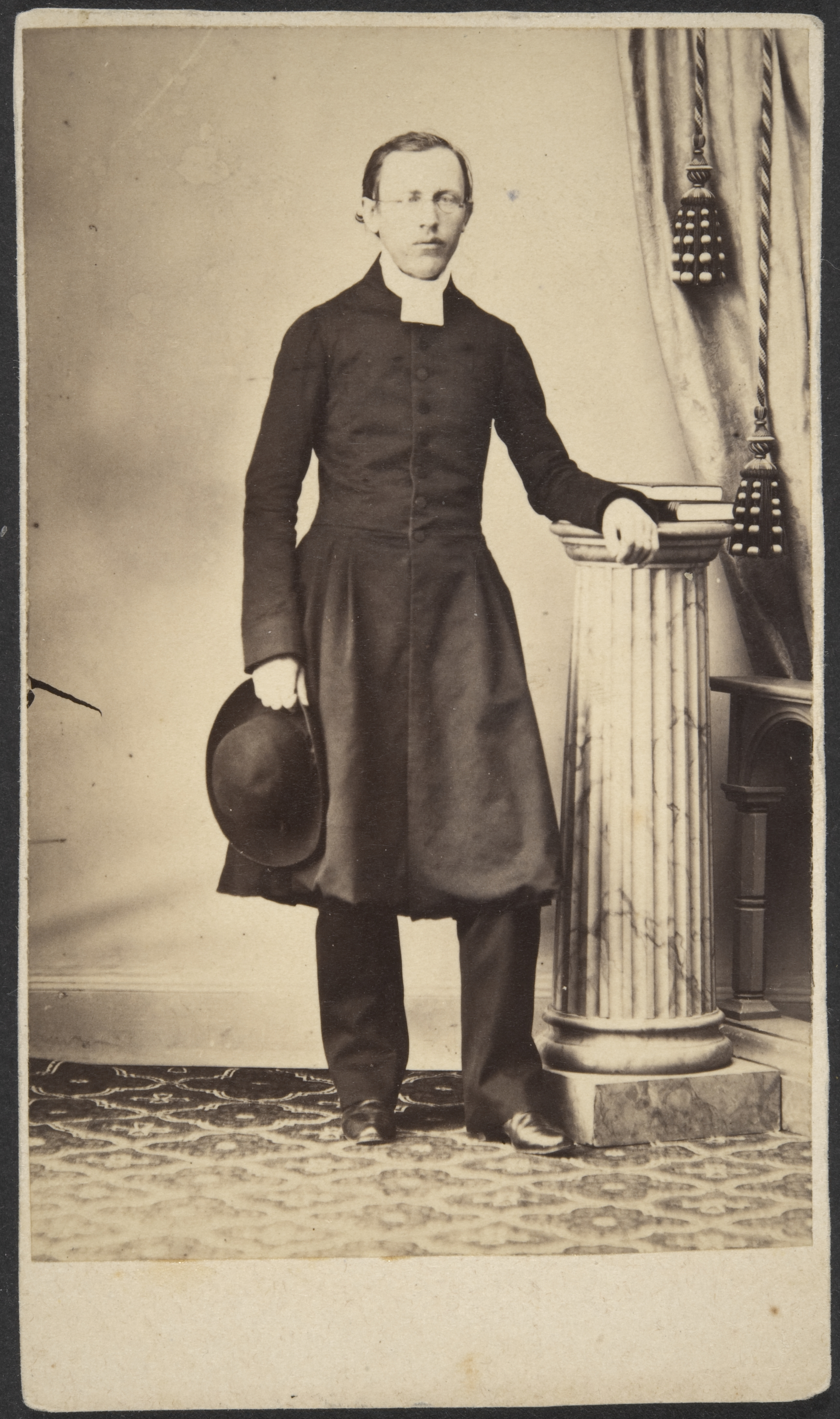
Alopaeus, early 1860s.

=== C.O. Malm and the Porvoo school ===
Carl Oscar (C.O.) Malm, a Finnish man deaf from childhood, was to play a key role in Alopaeus' work in deaf education. As a child, Malm had studied at the Manilla school for the deaf (Manillaskolan) in Stockholm, Sweden, becoming bilingual in sign language and written Swedish. In 1845, Malm went to Porvoo. There his passion for education led him to found a private school for the deaf in 1846, focusing mainly on sign language and written Swedish (see manualism), in contrast to the oralism commonly used in deaf education at the time. Alopaeus took an interest in the school, supporting it as editor of the newspaper Borgå Tidning, as well as helping raise funds for its operation and teaching.

=== Turku school for the deaf ===
In 1858, the state established a school for the deaf in Turku; Malm, Alopaeus, and some students followed. Alopaeus had visited deaf schools abroad to learn more. His application for the position of director of the school was supported by fellow provost and educator of the deaf Henrik Heikel as well as educator Alexander Ferdinand Borenius. Alopaeus was chosen for director on 25 April 1860. As a priest, he could provide religious education at the school as well. Alopaeus also had "perfect speech and hearing", a requirement which disqualified Malm.

The Turku school for the deaf and Alopaeus' work were noted in an 1868 report by the United States Secretary of the Interior, who remarked on the focus on instruction in sign language and written text, unusual at the time. (These methods were to remain until the 1892 decree mandating oralism and lip reading.) It was also noted that education for the deaf existed in Finland for some time before such education was available in Washington, D.C.

Prior to the establishment of primary schooling in the late 1800s, Alopaeus' goal was to integrate deaf education with public education. Together with the founder of the Finnish public school system, Uno Cygnaeus, he wrote a report advocating for a unified school system. In the end, he was unsuccessful as Cygnaeus believed it would set back the plan for public schooling.

=== Jakobstad school for the deaf ===
In Turku, Anna Heikel (daughter of Henrik Heikel) followed her own interest in education. At 22 years old, she did an internship with Alopaeus. She took his methods back to her home in Jakobstad and founded the Jakobstad school for the deaf Swedish-speaking population together with her father at his own expense. Alopaeus and Heikel would later travel to the area of Lappmarken in the summer of 1866, where together they instructed the deaf.

== Writings and other work ==
Alopaeus continued raising funds for and conducting research into deaf education as well as traveling the country teaching and giving confirmation. He published several books on deaf education as well as religious works and contributed to the publication of the first Finnish book in Braille. Alopaeus' works include Handledning till döfstummas uppfostran (1866), Lutheranism och baptism (1871), Den heliga läran (1873), and Guds rikes historia (1887–1890, interrupted due to his death).

== Death ==
Alopaeus died on 10 March 1892 in Savonranta after a brief illness. While his death was rumored to be due to poisoning, it was unproven. He was buried in Porvoo.

== See also ==
- Deaf education
- History of institutions for deaf education
