= Lilly Hellström =

Swedish editor and suffragist

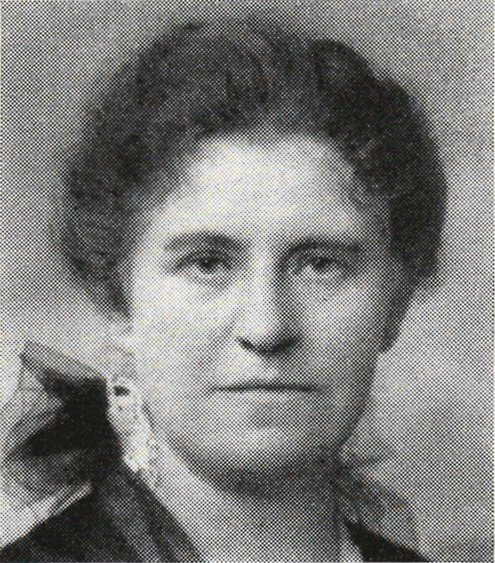
Lilly Hellström

Elin Sofia Elisabeth "Lilly" Hellström (née Kullberg; 21 August 1866 – 2 March 1930) was a Swedish schoolteacher, children's newspaper editor and an active member of the Swedish suffrage movement. In 1917, she established Moderata Kvinnors Rösträttsförening (Moderate Party's Women's Suffrage Association) under the National Association for Women's Suffrage (LKPR). After the death of her close friend and collaborator Stina Quint, Hellström became more politically active in the conservative Allmänna valmansförbundet.

== Biography ==
Born in Nyköping on 21 August 1866, Elin Sofia Elisabeth Kullberg was the daughter of the bookshop owner Emil Gustaf Theodor Kullberg (1835–1897) and his wife Jenny Rosalie Leontina née Krogh (1843–1922). She was one of the family's six children. In 1889, she married the businessman John Hellström (1859–1889) who died just two months after their wedding.

Lilly Kullberg attended Nyköping Elementary Girls' School where she later worked as a teacher from 1885 to 1889. After her husband's death, she became a close friend of her fellow teacher, Stina Quint. The two collaborated on providing better opportunities for children to develop their reading skills. In addition to creating the children's newspaper Folkskolans Barntidning, they published children's books through the bookbinding business established by Lilly Hellström's father.

In 1904, Hellström and Quint moved into a villa in Elfvik on the island of Lidingö. It became a popular meeting place for writers, artists, suffragettes and local politicians. Both were active on the committee of the Moderate Party's women's association in Stockholm, cooperating with Allmänna valmansförbundet (AVF) on women's suffrage. From 1917, Hellström developed the suffrage association Moderata Kvinnors Rösträttsförening in collaboration with the national LKPR organization.

Lilly Hellström died in Stockholm on 2 March 1930.
