= Ossian Edmund Borg =

Swedish teacher of the deaf

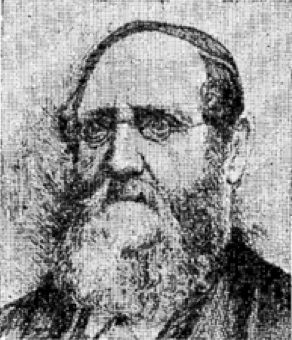
- Born: 6 August 1812; Hedvig Eleonora Parish, Sweden
- Died: 10 April 1892 (aged 79); Stockholm, Sweden
- Resting place: Norra begravningsplatsen, Sweden
- Education: Uppsala University
- Spouse: Anna Sofia Karolina Sadelin (m. 1848)
- Father: Pär Aron Borg

Ossian Edmund Borg (6 August 1812 – 10 April 1892) was a Swedish teacher of the deaf and head of the Manillaskolan school for the deaf. He was the son of Pär Aron Borg, pioneer of deaf schooling in Sweden.

== Life and work ==
Borg was born 6 August 1812 in Hedvig Eleonora Parish, Stockholm, Sweden, to Pär Aron Borg, three years after his father founded Allmänna institutet för döva och blinda å Manilla (Manillaskolan), the first school for the deaf in Sweden.

Borg began his studies in Uppsala, Sweden, in 1832; he had decided on the medical field and was ready to take his bachelor's degree in medicine when his studies were interrupted due to the death of his father in 1839. Borg was immediately appointed director and first teacher at the Institute for the Deaf and Blind; he had previously run the institute during his father's trips abroad. Borg would subsequently devote his entire life to the further expansion and development of the institute.

Special grants from King Oscar I and the Riksdag in 1844 enabled Borg to build a completely new department for the blind, which had previously been housed with the others in the main building, and also to erect a new main building on the site in 1864.

Borg knew Carl Oscar Malm, a former student at Manillaskolan from Finland who had studied there during Borg's time as director. Malm considered him a role model; he exchanged letters with Malm, providing detailed advice and supporting him in founding the first school for the deaf in Finland, which opened in Porvoo in 1846.

On 31 August 1848, Borg married his cousin, Anna Sofia Karolina Sadelin.

On 3 May 1868, Borg, together with artist Albert Berg and teacher of the deaf Fritjof Carlbom, founded the Deaf-Mute Society/Stockholms Dövas Förening. He retired in 1875, but continued to assist at the teacher training college he had founded in Manilla and teaching private lessons in sign language.

Borg died 10 April 1892 in Stockholm and is buried in Norra begravningsplatsen.
