= Alböke Church =

- Alböke kyrka
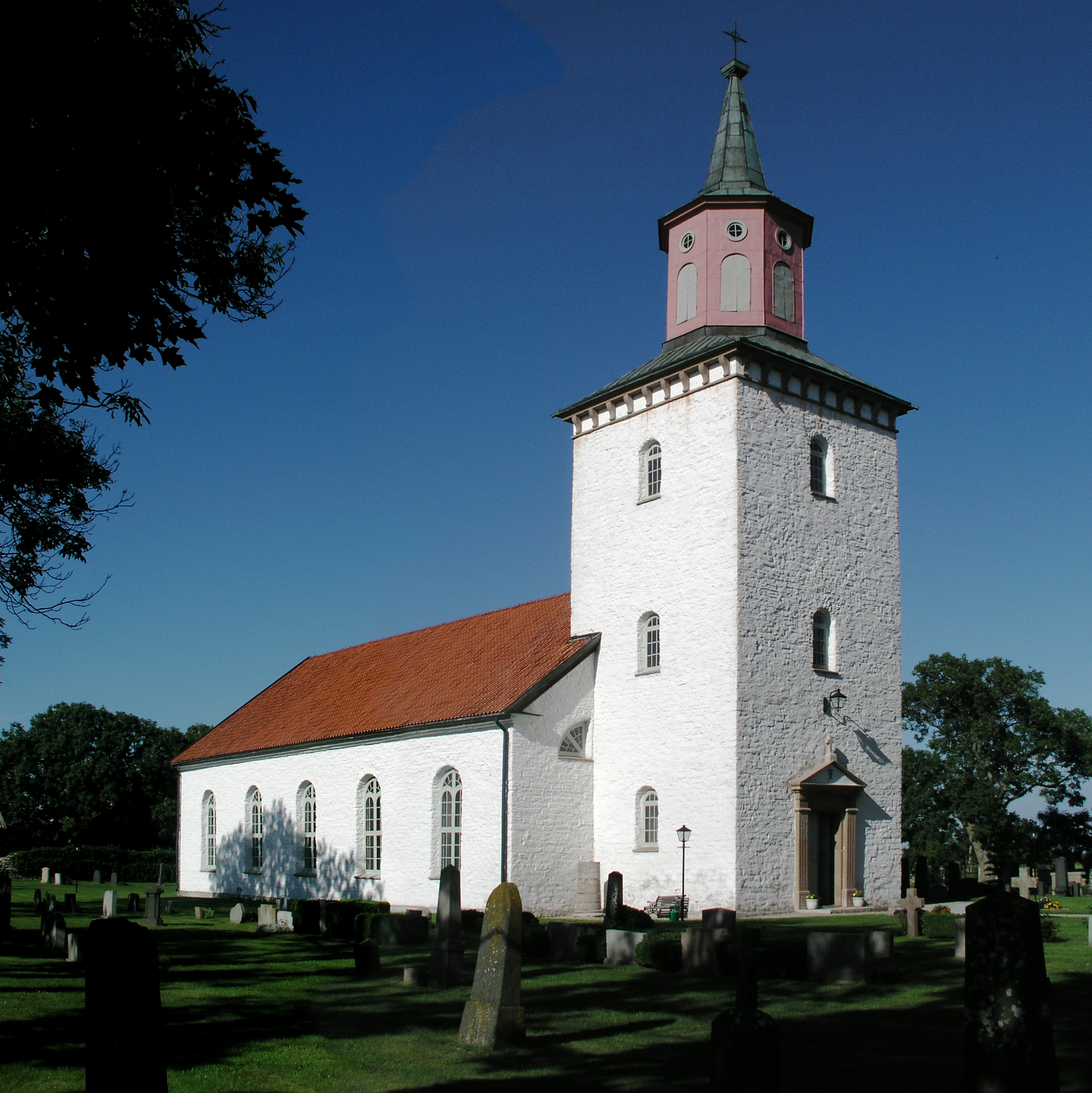
- Alböke Church, external view]

- Location within Kalmar
- 56°56′51″N 16°47′02″E
- Country: Sweden
- Denomination: Church of Sweden

Administration
- Diocese: Växjö

Alböke Church (Swedish: Alböke kyrka) is a Lutheran church on the Swedish island Öland, in the Baltic Sea. It belongs to the Diocese of Växjö.

== History and architecture ==
A church has existed on the site since the Middle Ages. The presently visible church was however erected 1859–62. Building material for the church tower was taken from the old church. The church contains a Romanesque baptismal font, probably made by the artist known as Master Byzantios on Gotland. The pulpit and altarpiece both date from 1794.
