= Båraryd Church =

Båraryds Church
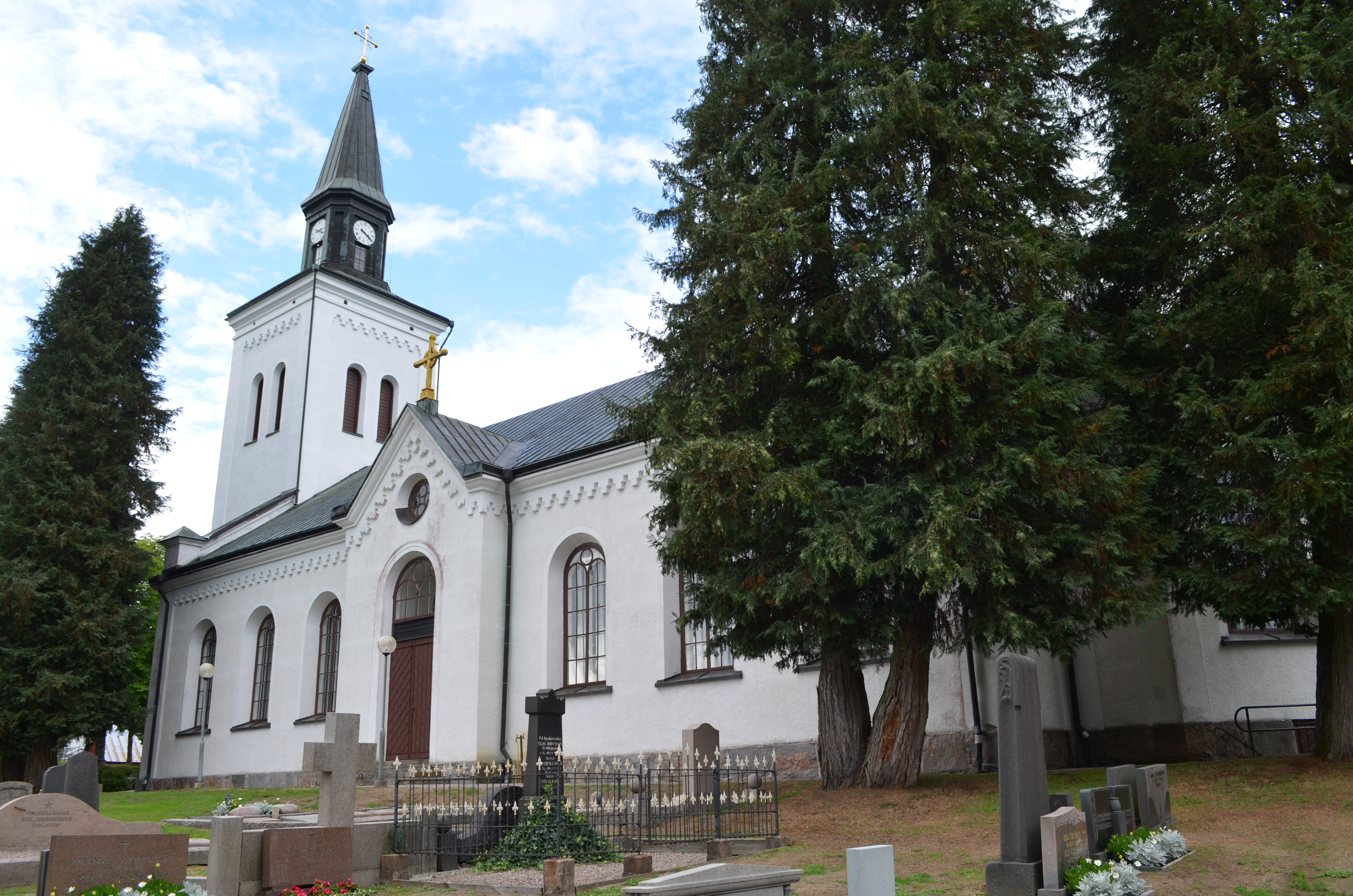
- Båraryds Church
- 57°20′47.61″N 13°31′29.13″E
- Location: Båraryd
- Country: Sweden
- Denomination: Church of Sweden
- Website: Sv Kyrkan Gislaved

History
- Dedicated: 1882

Administration
- Diocese: Diocese of Växjö

Båraryd Church is a church in Gislaved's congregation in the Diocese of Växjö, Sweden. The church is the congregation's largest church.

== Church building ==
The earlier church was probably built during the 13th century in the shape of a stone Latin cross church with a choir. It is possible that this church has a predecessor, a smaller wooden church. When the medieval church was demolished, a wooden beam with the year 1107 carved was found. Through the course of the century the church became subject to renovation and expansion. In 1776 the church was expanded to double its size. According to a drawing the church, apart from the Latin cross church building, consisted of a larger choir, sacristy, and a church porch. Since the church lacked towers the church bells were placed in a belfry.

== Interior ==
- Many medieval objects from the old church are ruined. The old pulpit is one of them.
- A baptismal font in sandstone dated to the 13th century is preserved from the previous church
- The altarpiece is painted by Ingeborg Westfelt-Eggertz and depicts Jesus.
- The altar rail is semicircular with undecorated mirrors.
- The pulpit with a sounding board from the time the church was built has a five-sided basket with gilded decor in the mirrors.
- Organ loft with a flared center piece.
