= Stina Quint =

Swedish teacher, editor, suffragette, and feminist

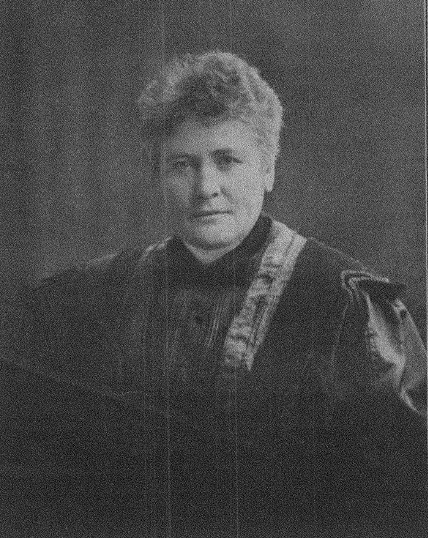
- Stina Quint in 1909
- Born: Kristina Quint; 13 April 1859; Frillestad, Sweden
- Died: 30 October 1924 (aged 65); Stockholm, Sweden
- Occupations: Educator; editor; politician
- Parents: Ola Quint; Elna Kristina

Kristina Quint (13 April 1859 – 30 October 1924) was a Swedish educator, children's newspaper editor, suffragette, and feminist. She was the founder and editor of one of the earliest children's magazines in Sweden, Kamratposten (Folkskolans Barntidning). An active member of the country's women's suffrage movement, Quint served as the deputy chair of Moderata Kvinnors Rösträttsförening since its inception in 1917.

== Life ==
Stina Quint was born on 13 April 1859 at Frillestad parish, Scania, one of the five children born to soldier Ola Quint and Elna Kristina. Quint attended the Frillestad public school, and between 1874 and 1875, she took teachers' training at Småskollärarinneseminariet in Landskrona. She worked as a junior school teacher in Scania. In 1876, she enrolled in a public school teacher training programme in Stockholm. Upon completion of the degree, she began working as a school-teacher in Hudiksvall. In 1880, she taught at a public school in Nyköping.

While working as a school-teacher, Quint championed for providing better reading opportunities to children, and she sought to publish new reading materials for them. As an active member of the local public-school teacher association in Arnö, she had close connection with the Swedish public-school teachers' association, Sveriges Folkskollärarförbund. She approached the association with a proposal to publish one weekly magazine for school children. However, her proposition was rejected. With the support of Sophie Adlersparre, the founder of Home Review, Quint earned a letter of recommendation in favour of publication of the children's journal.

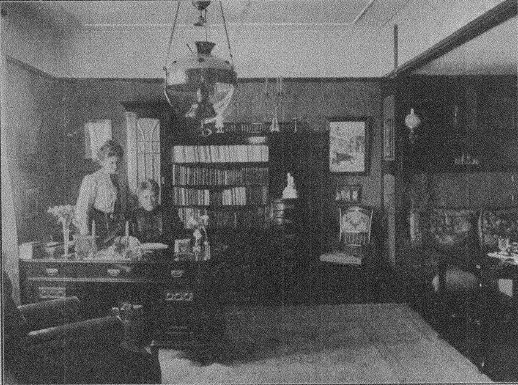
Quint at her study with Lilly Hellström in 1909.

Quint developed a close friendship with fellow school-teacher Lilly Hellström, who served as a translator and writer for the magazine. The first issue of the journal entitled Folkskolans barntidning (later known as Kamratposten) was published on 16 March 1892, and it was printed at the bookbindery of Hellström's father. Among the magazine's contributors were eminent contemporary writers such as Jenny Nyström, Ottilia Adelborg, Elsa Beskow, Anna Maria Roos, Matilda Roos, and Cecilia Bååth-Holmberg. Since its inception, the magazine showed the works of a broad array of women writers, and a complimentary issue of the journal Till Föräldrar, Tidskrift för att sprida goda uppfostringsgrundsatser was subsequently published.

In 1896, Quint and Hellström moved to Stockholm, where they set up a publishing house for children's books. Quint was in charge of the company while Hellström served as its executive director. The company expanded its publications, which included a children's Christmas-time publication Julklappen, a journal Linnea, calendars Guldslottet, Tummetott, Gullebrand, and Trisse, as well as the storybook Rosengull. These publications involved the same writers and illustrators who contributed to Folkskolans barntidning.

In 1904, Quint and Hellström moved to Villa Hagen in Elfvik, Lidingö, and Hellström served as Quint's co-editor. During this time, the villa became an influential meeting forum for writers, suffragettes, artists, and municipal politicians. Quint was active in politics, reform, and was an active member of the women's suffrage movement. She served as a member of the women's association Kvinnoklubben in Stockholm for 12 years, and was in charge of handling the finances of Dagny, a journal published by the cultural association Fredrika Bremer Association. In 1902, she was elected as a board member of the Föreningen för kvinnans politiska rösträtt (Society for Women's Suffrage), and remained its treasurer until 1913. Following the election in 1914, she was appointed as a representative of Allmänna valmansförbundet (AVF). Along with Hellström, Quint became an active member of the Moderate Party women's association and its committee, which worked closely with AVF on women's suffrage. After its inception, she was elected as the deputy chair of Moderata Kvinnors Rösträttsförening (Moderate Party Women's Suffrage Association), and remained till 1919.

Quint died on 30 October 1924 in Stockholm.
