= Pär Aron Borg =

Swedish pedagogue (1776–1839)

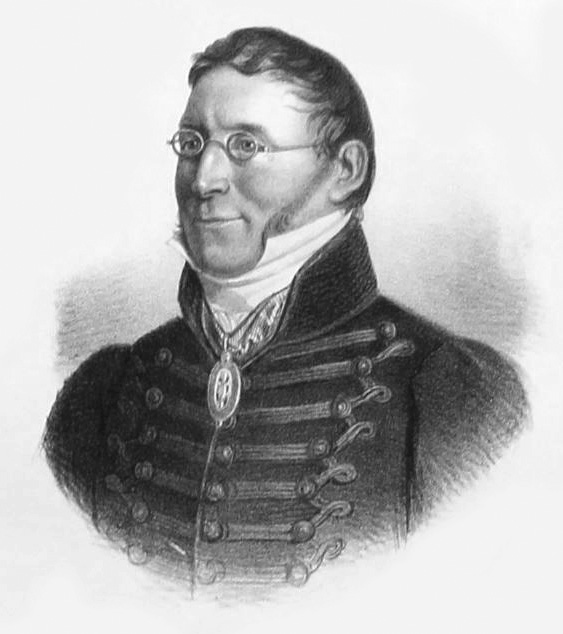
- Born: 4 July 1776; Avesta parish
- Died: 22 April 1839 (aged 62); City of Stockholm
- Resting place: Norra begravningsplatsen
- Alma mater: Uppsala University
- Occupation: Sign language teacher, deaf school founder
- Children: Ossian Edmund Borg

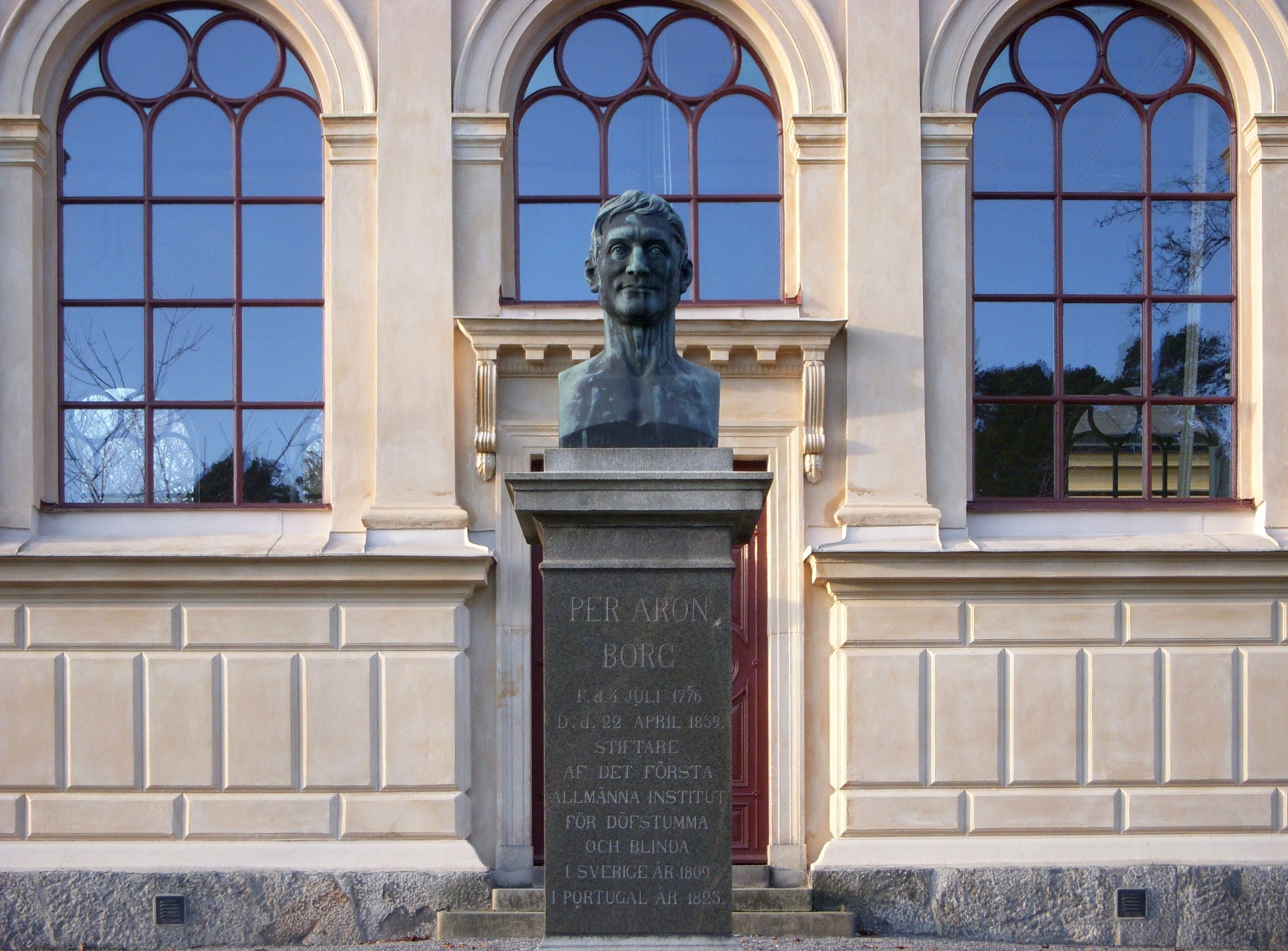
Bust by J. F. Kjellberg at Manillaskolan in Stockholm

Pär Aron Borg (4 July 1776 – 22 April 1839) was a Swedish educator and a pioneer in the education for the blind and deaf.

== Biography ==
Borg was born in the parish of Avesta in Dalarna, Sweden. After studies at Uppsala University (1796–1798), he became a secretary in the Central Government Office (centrala ämbetsverk) in Stockholm.

After having seen a play where a deaf boy communicated by gestures, he was inspired to create a manual alphabet. He began to educate deaf and blind students regularly in 1808. Following the example of l'Abbé de l'Épée founded by Charles-Michel de l'Épée in Paris, in 1809 he founded Allmänna institutet för döfstumma och blinda å Manilla (Public Institute of the Blind and Deaf at Manilla; Manillaskolan). The institution received support from Queen Hedwig Elizabeth Charlotte (1759–1818). The school had deaf teachers, and the instruction was taught in sign language.

Among his notable students was concert singer, composer and poet Charlotta Seuerling (1782/1784–1828). He was the guardian and mentor of Johanna Berglind (1816–1903), also an important figure in the history of the education of the deaf in Sweden.

Borg made a trip to Portugal in 1823–1828, where he founded a school for the deaf; thereby Portugal was given the same manual alphabet as Sweden. Pär Aron Borg died in 1839 and was succeeded as director of the institute by his son, Ossian Edmund Borg (1812–1892).

== Other sources ==
- Svensk Läraretidning nr 29, 1901, om Borg (in Swedish)
- Om Borg på Manillas skoltidning (in Swedish)

== Related reading ==
- Jean-Nicolas Bouilly (1993) Abbé de l'Épée eller Den döfve och dumbe: historiskt skådespel uti 5 acter (SIH-läromedel) ISBN 9159804394
