= Stockholm Institute of Education =

University college in Stockholm, Sweden

Coordinates: 59.3300°N 18.0153°E

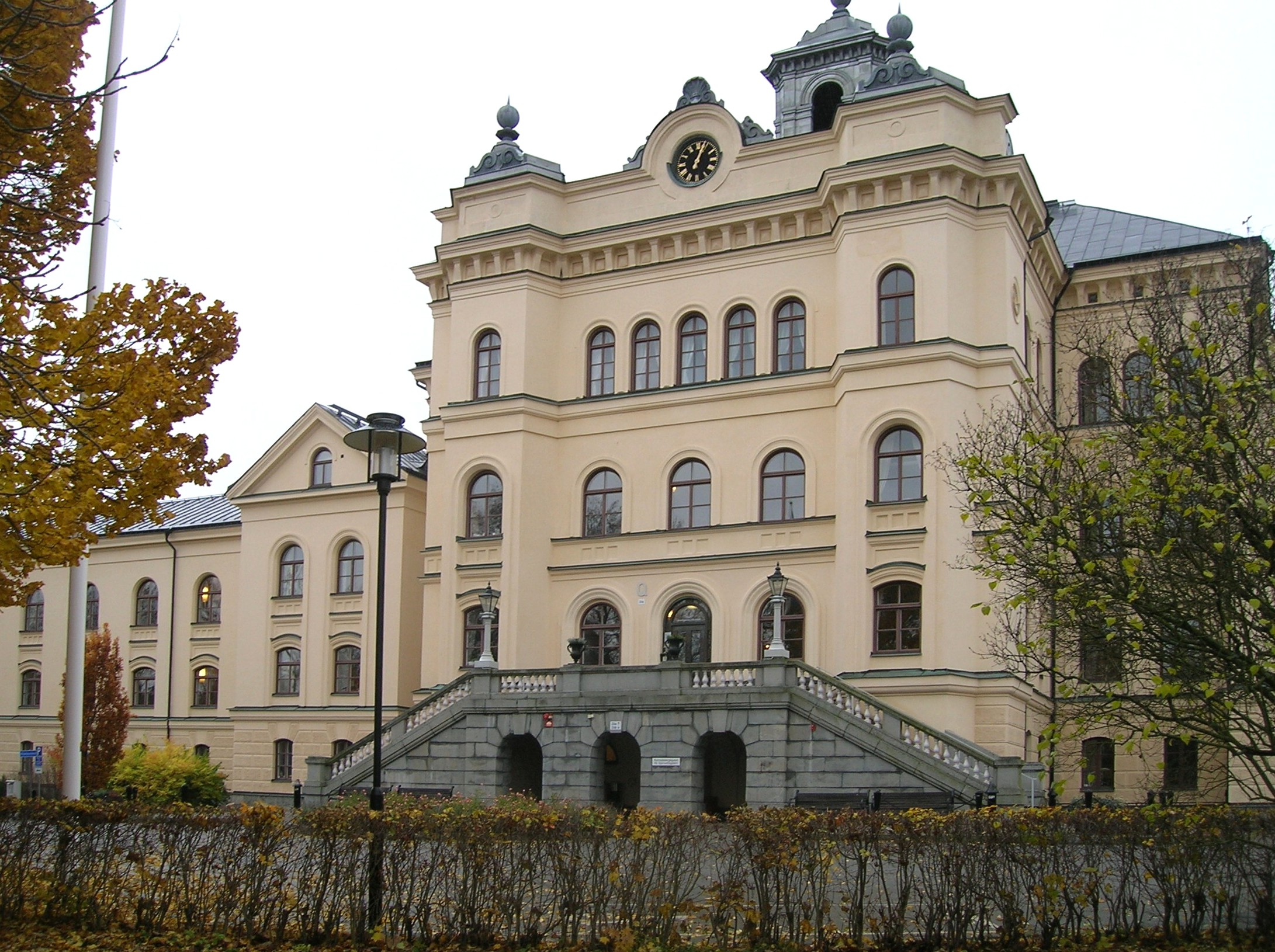
The Stockholm Institute of Education, Konradsberg

The Stockholm Institute of Education (Swedish: Lärarhögskolan i Stockholm) was a university college in Stockholm, Sweden that was founded in 1956. It was incorporated into Stockholm University on January 1, 2008.
