= Konradsberg =

Coordinates: 59°19′48″N 18°00′52″E

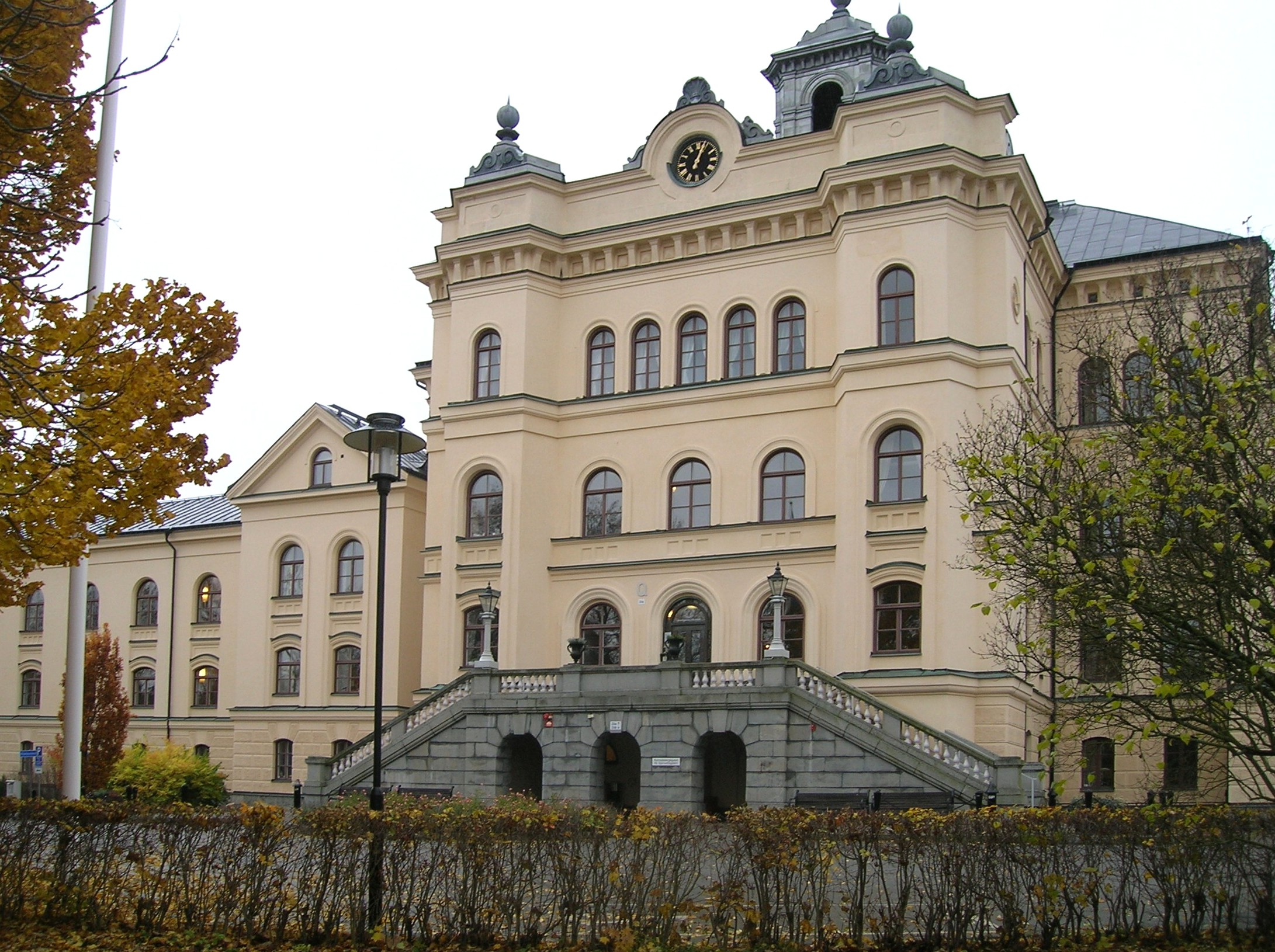
- Konradsbergs hospital
- Interactive map of the Konradsberg area

General information
- Location: Stockholm, Sweden
- Construction started: 1855
- Completed: 1871

Design and construction
- Architect: Albert Törnqvist

Konradsberg or Konradsbergs hospital is a former mental hospital on the island of Kungsholmen in Stockholm, Sweden. The Stockholm Institute of Education now uses the old hospital building. From August 2009 the charter school Stockholm's International Montessori School used the building.

Campus Konradsberg is named after the psychiatric hospital.

== History ==
Konradsberg was one of Sweden's first psychiatric hospitals and was built 1855-1871 after designs by the architect Albert Törnqvist. The building had a castle-like appearance and was quickly given the nickname Dårarnas Slott (Lunatic Castle). In the 1850s, a comprehensive debate had risen where several significant doctors, including Magnus Huss, demanded Stockholm to improve the conditions for the patients. There was already a psychiatric hospital in Danviken which was in very poor condition with dark premises and moisture. The mental hospital was built at the beach and was therefore difficult to renovate.

Konradsberg is located in a park area. The building is H-shaped with a one-way corridor system. The middle of the building is equipped with a clock as well as a roof lantern decorated with a cross. The first 101 patients were moved to Konradsberg from Danvikens Hospital November 29, 1861.

Many old trees grow in the surrounding park. The area was previously fenced in and the public was not allowed on to the premises until the 1980s. The name Konradsberg comes from Konrad Heijsman who owned a plot of land in the area in the 1770s.
