= Rönström =

Rönström is a Swedish surname. Notable people with the surname include:

- Anna Rönström (1847–1920), Swedish educator
- Gunnar Rönström (1884–1941), Swedish track and field athlete
- Eva Rönström (1932–2021), Swedish gymnast
