= Anna Johansson =

Anna Johansson may refer to:

- Anna Johansson (dancer), Russian ballet dancer
- Anna Johansson (politician) (born 1971), Swedish politician
- Anna Johansson (ice hockey) (born 1994), Swedish ice hockey player
- Anna Johansson (swimmer) (1895–1978), Swedish diver and swimmer commonly known as Greta Johansson

== See also ==
- Anna Johansson-Visborg, Swedish trade union leader, women's rights activist and politician
- Annie Johansson, Swedish politician
