= EQI =

EQI may refer to:

- Educational Quality Inspection, as used by Independent Schools Inspectorate in England
- Education Queensland International, program by Department of Education (Queensland) for international students to study in Queensland, example Mount Gravatt State High School
- EQ-i, Emotional Quotient inventory, tool used to assess emotional intelligence
- Equity Index (New Zealand)
- European Quality of Government Index, as used by Quality of Government Institute
