= Sabater =

Sabater is a surname of Catalan origin, deriving from sabater (shoemaker). Notable people with the surname include:

- Alfredo Benjamin Sabater Caguioa (born 1959), Filipino lawyer and jurist
- Arnaldo Sabater (born 1945), Puerto Rican hurdler
- Carles Sabater (1962–1999), Catalan singer and actor
- Damià Sabater (born 1996), Spanish footballer
- Francisco Sabater Llopart (1915–1960), Spanish anarchist
- Jimmy Sabater (1936–2012), American musician of Puerto Rican ancestry
- Jordi Sabater Pi (1922–2009), Spanish primatologist and specialist in ethologist
- Julio Sabater (1926–2003), Puerto Rican hurdler
- Leticia Sabater (born 1966), Spanish television presenter, actress and singer
- Luis Marín Sabater (1906–1974), Spanish-Basque football player
- Pau Sabater (1884–1919), Spanish anarcho-syndicalist
- Rafael Ginard i Sabater, 19th century skipper in Mallorca, Spain
- Rosa Sabater (1929–1983), Spanish pianist

== See also ==
- Amanda Sabater, Venezuelan telenovela produced by Radio Caracas Televisión in 1989
