= Government competitiveness =

Government competitiveness is a state capacity concept created by Tobin Im, a scholar of public administration and a professor at the Graduate School of Public Administration at Seoul National University. Since 2011, the Center for Government Competitiveness (CGC) at Seoul National University has developed the Government Competitiveness (GC) index, which evaluates government achievements in the various fields and provides policy recommendations to increase the competitiveness of government in the future.

== Description ==
Government competitiveness (GC) is often confounded with similar concepts. One of the prominent examples is national competitiveness. A variety of institutions have developed indices measuring the level of national competitiveness. Two indices, the World Competitiveness Scoreboard (WCS) developed by the International Institute for Management Development (IMD) and the Global Competitiveness Index (GCI) built by the World Economic Forum (WEF) have come to dominate the field of competitiveness studies.

The International Institute for Management Development WCS and the World Economic Forum's Global Competitiveness Index view national competitiveness akin to how business-friendly a nation is and focus upon economic and market indicators. As such, if a nation is a favorable place for foreign firms to do business and make money, it will, as a result, be viewed as competitive. Following this logic, the role played by a government, then, is mainly restricted to constructing an environment that is attractive to businesses.

Stressing the broader fields of government activities, several institutions have started to develop indicators emphasizing the role of government in driving development and national competitiveness. Prominent examples include The World Bank’s Worldwide Governance Indicators (WGI) and the Quality of Government Institute’s (QGI) (the University of Gothenburg) Quality of Government indicators (QoG).

While these two indices constitute important steps toward improving our understanding of how government contributes toward competitiveness, they have also revealed numerous theoretical and methodological shortcomings related to the study of governments’ role in fostering national competitiveness.

Since 2011, the Center for Government Competitiveness (director: Tobin Im) has developed the GC index, mainly focusing on government capacities and roles in national development. After investigating the limited capabilities of existing competitiveness indicators to define and measure the level of GC, the CGC has tried to develop a novel approach to conceptualizing and measuring GC. According to Ho and Im (2012), the concept of GC can be defined as “the power of government to, in light of various constraints, take resources from in and outside of the country and improve social, economic and cultural conditions of the nation in order to sustainably enhance citizens’ quality of life." Moreover, the concepts of ‘constraints’ and ‘quality of life’ can be interpreted in various ways, depending on a nation's unique environments.

By considering different experiences and policy practices between developed countries and developing countries, the CGC measures the level of government competitiveness by applying different criteria to OECD and non-OECD countries. Both OECD and non-OECD countries share the following seven fields of government activities: economy, education, health and welfare, agriculture and food, ICT, energy and environment, and governance. For OECD countries, three more fields are added: research and development, culture and tourism, and disaster management. Meanwhile, non-OECD countries have nine fields of government activities in total, including infrastructure and safety.

The CGC builds the GC index based on David Easton's system theory as a theoretical framework. Therefore, the GC Index first analyzes competitiveness through each of the four levels—input, throughput (public management capacity), output, and outcome. The index then aggregates results from each level to produce an overall competitiveness score. This approach generates a variety of policy implications at each systemic level. The following are some sub-categories for each stage

Input: resources, infrastructure, government expenditure, environment
Throughput: human, fiscal, organizational capacity, policy, system, process
Output: production, growth rate, improvement level, immediate goal achievement
Outcome: quality of life, satisfaction, social capital, ultimate goal achievement

Figure 1. GC Policy stage, edited from Easton's system theory

== OECD rankings in 2013-2021 ==
| Rank | Countries | GC score 2020-21 | GC 2020-21 | GC 2019-20 | GC 2018-19 | GC 2017-18 | GC 2016-17 | GC 2015-16 | GC 2014-15 | GC 2013-14 |
|---|---|---|---|---|---|---|---|---|---|---|
| 2 | Netherlands | 0.530 | 2 | 1 | 3 | 1 | 8 | 2 | 2 | |
| 1 | Denmark | 0.537 | 1 | 2 | 2 | 2 | 5 | 11 | 7 | 6 |
| 8 | Switzerland | 0.491 | 8 | 3 | 3 | 1 | 2 | 2 | 3 | 7 |
| 14 | Norway | 0.431 | 14 | 6 | 4 | 4 | 4 | 1 | 5 | 5 |
| 21 | New Zealand | 0.416 | 21 | 15 | 5 | 12 | 14 | 4 | 8 | 10 |
| 11 | Luxembourg | 0.459 | 11 | 13 | 6 | 5 | 13 | 5 | 13 | 13 |
| 9 | Finland | 0.486 | 9 | 10 | 7 | 7 | 9 | 9 | 6 | 4 |
| 13 | Sweden | 0.431 | 13 | 12 | 8 | 9 | 8 | 3 | 1 | 3 |
| 26 | Iceland | 0.393 | 26 | 24 | 9 | 15 | 3 | 1 | 7 | 11 |
| 19 | Australia | 0.421 | 19 | 19 | 10 | 13 | 16 | 14 | 12 | 11 |
| 16 | United States | 0.428 | 16 | 8 | 11 | 6 | 6 | 6 | 4 | 1 |
| 6 | United Kingdom | 0.496 | 6 | 5 | 12 | 8 | 11 | 15 | 9 | 8 |
| 4 | France | 0.506 | 4 | 9 | 13 | 10 | 10 | 19 | 18 | 16 |
| 5 | Germany | 0.505 | 5 | 4 | 14 | 11 | 7 | 10 | 10 | 9 |
| 3 | Austria | 0.507 | 3 | 7 | 15 | 14 | 12 | 12 | 17 | 17 |
| 28 | Canada | 0.379 | 28 | 26 | 16 | 16 | 20 | 13 | 14 | 12 |
| 22 | Ireland | 0.404 | 22 | 20 | 17 | 17 | 15 | 20 | 21 | 20 |
| 15 | Belgium | 0.429 | 15 | 17 | 18 | 18 | 17 | 17 | 19 | 18 |
| 10 | Japan | 0.468 | 10 | 14 | 19 | 20 | 19 | 18 | 15 | 14 |
| 17 | Spain | 0.427 | 17 | 18 | 20 | 19 | 18 | 22 | 23 | 23 |
| 12 | Estonia | 0.439 | 12 | 16 | 21 | 22 | 22 | 16 | 20 | 22 |
| 7 | South Korea | 0.492 | 7 | 11 | 22 | 25 | 27 | 21 | 16 | 19 |
| 20 | Slovenia | 0.421 | 20 | 21 | 23 | 23 | 25 | 24 | 24 | 25 |
| 23 | Italy | 0.404 | 23 | 23 | 24 | 21 | 23 | 27 | 29 | 26 |
| 25 | Israel | 0.393 | 25 | 27 | 25 | 24 | 21 | 23 | 22 | 21 |
| 18 | Portugal | 0.422 | 18 | 22 | 26 | 26 | 24 | 26 | 25 | 24 |
| 24 | Czech Republic | 0.399 | 24 | 25 | 27 | 27 | 26 | 25 | 26 | 27 |
| 27 | Poland | 0.390 | 27 | 28 | 28 | 28 | 29 | 30 | 31 | 30 |
| 32 | Latvia | 0.330 | 32 | 33 | 29 | 32 | .. | .. | .. | .. |
| 29 | Hungary | 0.360 | 29 | 29 | 30 | 29 | 31 | 29 | 28 | 29 |
| 30 | Greece | 0.345 | 30 | 30 | 31 | 30 | 30 | 28 | 32 | 32 |
| 33 | Slovak Republic | 0.328 | 33 | 31 | 32 | 31 | 28 | 31 | 30 | 31 |
| 34 | Chile | 0.316 | 34 | 34 | 33 | 33 | 32 | 32 | 27 | 28 |
| 35 | Turkey | 0.286 | 35 | 36 | 34 | 35 | 34 | 34 | 33 | 33 |
| 37 | Mexico | 0.268 | 37 | 35 | 35 | 34 | 33 | 33 | 34 | 34 |

== Non-OECD rankings in 2013-2021 ==
| Rank | Countries | GC score 2021-20 | GC 2021-20 | GC 2020-19 | GC 2018-19 | GC 2017-18 | GC 2016-17 | GC 2015-16 | GC 2014-15 | GC 2013-14 |
|---|---|---|---|---|---|---|---|---|---|---|
| 1 | Singapore | 0.711 | 1 | 1 | 1 | 1 | 1 | 1 | 1 | |
| 2 | South Korea | 0.679 | 2 | 3 | 2 | 2 | 2 | 2 | 2 | 2 |
| . | Lithuania | . | . | . | 3 | 3 | 6 | 8 | 6 | 3 |
| 3 | Costa Rica | 0.618 | 3 | 2 | 4 | 5 | 4 | 3 | 4 | 5 |
| 9 | Uruguay | 0.549 | 9 | 7 | 5 | 4 | 5 | 6 | 5 | 4 |
| 4 | Malaysia | 0.602 | 4 | 4 | 6 | 9 | 8 | 4 | 7 | 8 |
| 5 | Bulgaria | 0.600 | 5 | 5 | 7 | 7 | 11 | 7 | 7 | 11 |
| 6 | Romania | 0.592 | 6 | 6 | 8 | 8 | 9 | 15 | 24 | . |
| 12 | Croatia | 0.546 | 12 | 13 | 9 | 7 | 19 | 17 | 15 | 9 |
| 34 | Qatar | 0.483 | 34 | 27 | 10 | 6 | 3 | 5 | 3 | 6 |
| 15 | Panama | 0.541 | 15 | 8 | 11 | 13 | 13 | 10 | 16 | . |
| 10 | Brazil | 0.549 | 10 | 10 | 12 | 16 | 16 | 19 | 10 | 13 |
| 19 | Mauritius | 0.521 | 19 | 21 | 13 | 10 | 12 | 16 | 8 | . |
| 14 | China | 0.542 | 14 | 9 | 14 | 15 | 25 | 20 | 25 | 21 |
| 11 | Russian Federation | 0.547 | 11 | 16 | 15 | 14 | 18 | 24 | 31 | 30 |
| 7 | Serbia | 0.579 | 7 | 11 | 16 | 19 | 22 | 18 | 23 | . |
| 29 | Georgia | 0.497 | 29 | 25 | 17 | 12 | 34 | 25 | 13 | 10 |
| 18 | Belarus | 0.522 | 18 | 23 | 18 | 17 | 10 | 13 | 17 | . |
| 22 | Albania | 0.519 | 22 | 33 | 19 | 18 | 39 | 36 | 44 | . |
| 38 | Kuwait | 0.482 | 38 | 28 | 20 | 20 | 14 | 12 | 32 | 33 |
| 8 | Thailand | 0.551 | 8 | 12 | 21 | 26 | 20 | 11 | 14 | 14 |
| 35 | Bahrain | 0.483 | 35 | 48 | 22 | 21 | 15 | 14 | 12 | 12 |
| . | Colombia | . | . | 14 | 23 | 29 | 23 | 23 | 19 | 15 |
| 20 | Peru | 0.520 | 20 | 19 | 24 | 25 | 26 | 32 | 42 | 27 |
| 13 | Argentina | 0.544 | 13 | 15 | 25 | 23 | 17 | 21 | 22 | 23 |
| 17 | Mongolia | 0.524 | 17 | 32 | 26 | 22 | 45 | 54 | 38 | 19 |
| 49 | Oman | 0.450 | 49 | 49 | 27 | 24 | 24 | 27 | 28 | 16 |
| 43 | Azerbaijan | 0.471 | 43 | 34 | 28 | 30 | 27 | 37 | 45 | 25 |
| 42 | Armenia | 0.471 | 42 | 37 | 29 | 28 | 28 | 49 | 29 | . |
| 62 | Moldova | 0.415 | 62 | 52 | 30 | 31 | 38 | 48 | 26 | . |
| 24 | Vietnam | 0.515 | 24 | 20 | 31 | 32 | 31 | 22 | 34 | 20 |
| 36 | Philippines | 0.483 | 36 | 31 | 32 | 37 | 37 | 26 | 37 | 37 |
| 21 | Ukraine | 0.519 | 21 | 30 | 33 | 35 | 35 | 38 | 46 | 28 |
| 25 | Ecuador | 0.508 | 25 | 18 | 34 | 38 | 33 | 28 | 18 | 35 |
| 32 | Tunisia | 0.485 | 32 | 35 | 35 | 34 | 32 | 35 | 21 | 11 |
| 39 | Jamaica | 0.482 | 39 | 50 | 36 | 43 | 47 | 46 | 49 | . |
| 47 | Uzbekistan | 0.454 | 47 | 62 | 37 | 39 | 36 | 43 | 47 | 46 |
| 16 | Kazakhstan | 0.541 | 16 | 24 | 38 | 36 | 21 | 29 | 20 | 17 |
| 23 | Indonesia | 0.518 | 23 | 17 | 39 | 48 | 43 | 30 | 43 | 31 |
| 48 | Paraguay | 0.454 | 48 | 45 | 40 | 33 | 40 | 33 | 51 | 38 |
| 37 | Morocco | 0.482 | 37 | 36 | 41 | 40 | 44 | 47 | 30 | 29 |
| 28 | Dominican Republic | 0.499 | 28 | 22 | 42 | 49 | 41 | 44 | 39 | . |
| 33 | Jordan | 0.485 | 33 | 43 | 43 | 27 | 30 | 31 | 36 | . |
| 27 | Sri Lanka | 0.499 | 27 | 26 | 44 | 41 | 29 | 34 | 33 | 22 |
| 26 | South Africa | 0.500 | 26 | 40 | 45 | 45 | 42 | 50 | 52 | . |
| 57 | Bosnia and Herzegovina | 0.429 | 57 | 61 | 46 | 44 | 52 | 39 | 55 | . |
| 53 | Kyrgyz Republic | 0.443 | 53 | 54 | 47 | 47 | 50 | 55 | 48 | . |
| 31 | Ghana | 0.490 | 31 | 42 | 48 | 42 | 51 | 52 | 41 | 32 |
| 71 | Lebanon | 0.376 | 71 | 63 | 49 | 46 | 59 | 60 | 69 | . |
| 30 | India | 0.496 | 30 | 39 | 50 | 50 | 61 | 56 | 50 | 26 |
| 51 | El Salvador | 0.445 | 51 | 38 | 51 | 53 | 49 | 42 | 35 | 24 |
| 50 | Honduras | 0.445 | 50 | 41 | 52 | 56 | 53 | 59 | 62 | 36 |
| 45 | Bolivia | 0.456 | 45 | 46 | 53 | 52 | 46 | 45 | 54 | 40 |
| 55 | Guatemala | 0.439 | 55 | 44 | 54 | 55 | 57 | 58 | 61 | 34 |
| 44 | Rwanda | 0.467 | 44 | 53 | 55 | 51 | 56 | 53 | 40 | 18 |
| 64 | Nicaragua | 0.407 | 64 | 58 | 56 | 58 | 60 | 51 | 53 | . |
| 40 | Botswana | 0.480 | 40 | 29 | 57 | 57 | 48 | 40 | 27 | . |
| 46 | Kenya | 0.455 | 46 | 47 | 58 | 60 | 65 | 68 | 58 | 42 |
| 45 | Bolivarian Republic of Venezuela | 0.456 | 45 | 46 | 59 | 61 | 55 | 41 | 56 | . |
| 41 | Nepal | 0.475 | 41 | 55 | 60 | 59 | 62 | 61 | 58 | 50 |
| 54 | Senegal | 0.440 | 54 | 51 | 61 | 63 | 63 | 66 | 59 | 39 |
| 56 | Egypt | 0.430 | 56 | 57 | 62 | 54 | 58 | 64 | 60 | 41 |
| 61 | Algeria | 0.415 | 61 | 56 | 63 | 62 | 54 | 62 | 57 | 53 |
| 52 | Cambodia | 0.443 | 52 | 60 | 64 | 65 | 66 | 63 | 63 | 43 |
| 63 | Lao People's Democratic Republic | 0.408 | 63 | 73 | 65 | 64 | 64 | 57 | 65 | 51 |
| 67 | Zambia | 0.399 | 67 | 59 | 66 | 68 | 68 | 67 | 70 | 47 |
| 59 | Tanzania | 0.417 | 59 | 67 | 67 | 66 | 67 | 71 | 71 | 44 |
| 65 | Bangladesh | 0.406 | 65 | 66 | 68 | 69 | 69 | 65 | 73 | 55 |
| 66 | Uganda | 0.403 | 66 | 68 | 69 | 67 | 73 | 73 | 74 | 48 |
| 70 | Pakistan | 0.384 | 70 | 65 | 70 | 71 | 78 | 79 | 81 | 57 |
| 71 | Benin | 0.417 | 58 | 64 | 71 | 74 | 75 | 74 | 66 | . |
| 80 | Cameroon | 0.336 | 80 | 74 | 72 | 70 | 72 | 69 | 78 | 58 |
| 60 | Malawi | 0.416 | 60 | 69 | 73 | 77 | 70 | 70 | 67 | . |
| 77 | Timor-Leste | 0.345 | 77 | 82 | 74 | 73 | 71 | 72 | 72 | 45 |
| 69 | Mali | 0.386 | 69 | 75 | 75 | 72 | 79 | 83 | 82 | 56 |
| 68 | Burkina Faso | 0.395 | 68 | 71 | 76 | 79 | 76 | 77 | 77 | 54 |
| 73 | Sierra Leone | 0.367 | 73 | 80 | 77 | 81 | 82 | 82 | 76 | . |
| 83 | Liberia | 0.297 | 83 | 83 | 78 | 75 | 81 | 80 | 64 | . |
| 75 | Nigeria | 0.354 | 75 | 72 | 79 | 76 | 83 | 81 | 80 | 59 |
| 76 | Madagascar | 0.346 | 76 | 81 | 80 | 80 | 86 | 85 | 89 | . |
| 72 | Mozambique | 0.374 | 72 | 76 | 81 | 82 | 80 | 75 | 79 | 52 |
| 74 | Ethiopia | 0.365 | 74 | 78 | 82 | 78 | 78 | 75 | 49 | . |
| 82 | Zimbabwe | 0.308 | 82 | 77 | 83 | 85 | 74 | 76 | 83 | . |
| 79 | Guinea | 0.342 | 79 | 79 | 84 | 83 | 87 | 87 | 86 | . |
| 86 | Mauritania | 0.273 | 86 | 85 | 85 | 84 | 84 | 86 | 84 | . |
| 84 | Sudan | 0.287 | 84 | 87 | 86 | 86 | 88 | 88 | 87 | . |
| 87 | Angola | 0.315 | 81 | 86 | 87 | 87 | 85 | 84 | 88 | . |
| 88 | Democratic Republic of the Congo | 0.280 | 85 | 84 | 88 | 88 | 89 | 89 | 88 | 60 |

- Korea is exceptionally included in the non-OECD cases for a reference point
- GC scores are rounded off to four decimal places. Therefore, the countries that seem to have the same scores have, in fact, different scores.

== See also ==
- Competition
- the Global Competitiveness Index
- World Competitiveness Yearbook
- The World Bank’s Worldwide Governance Indicators
