= Bo Rothstein =

Swedish political scientist

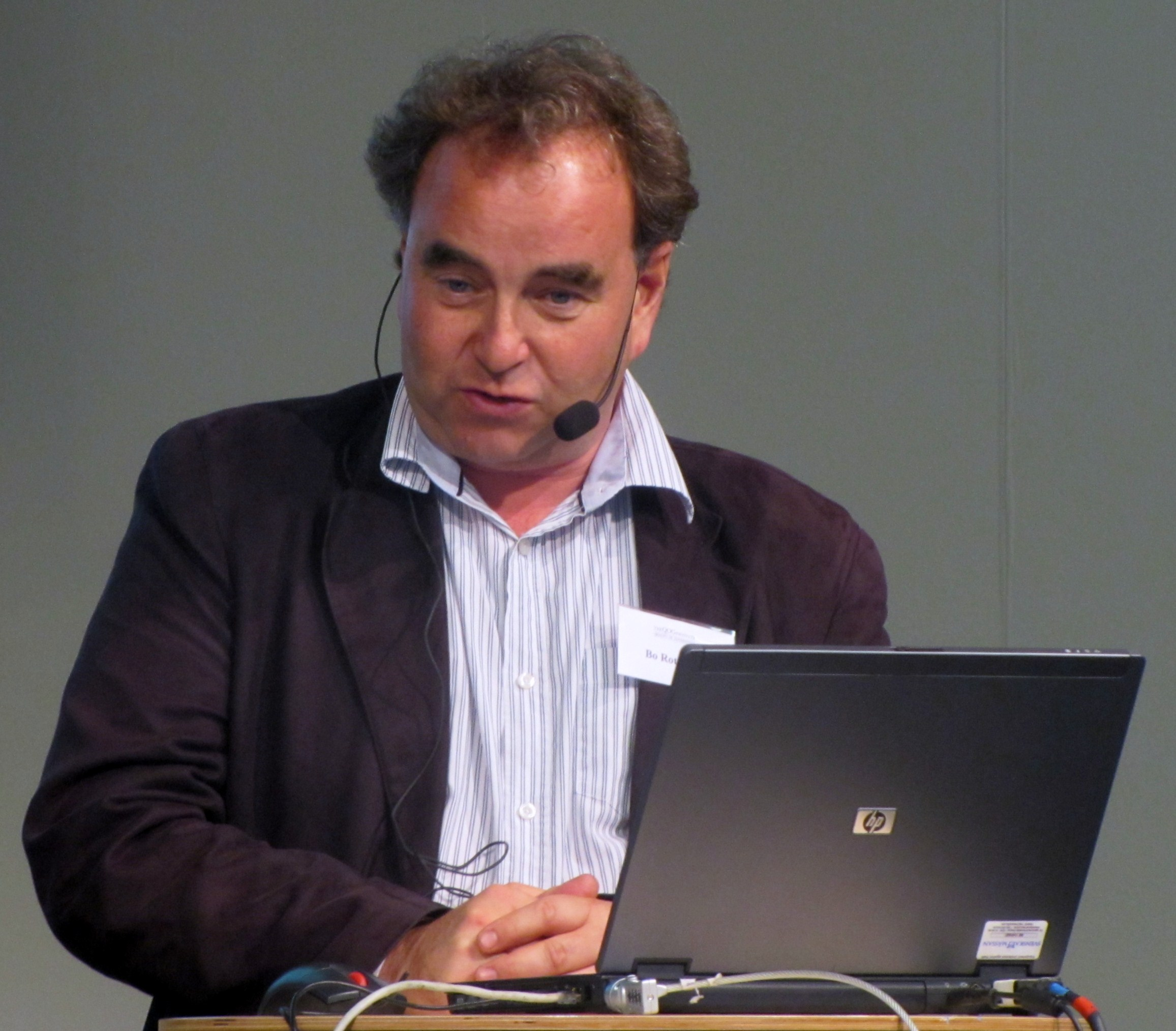
- Rothstein in September 2010
- Born: 12 June 1954 (age 71); Malmö, Sweden
- Occupation: Political scientist
- Years active: 1986–present

Bo Abraham Mendel Rothstein (born 12 June 1954) is a Swedish political scientist. He currently holds the August Röhss Chair in Political Science at the University of Gothenburg, and is a former professor of Government and Public Policy at the University of Oxford.

Rothstein is a contributor to Swedish public debate about politics and academic freedom. He has been especially critical of what he perceives as politicized research at some universities in Sweden. In 2003, he received the Swedish Association of University Teachers' prize for academic freedom. Rothstein received the prize for having "in the public debate argued for the importance of independent university teaching and research".

Rothstein is a critic of postmodernism and identity politics.

== Early life ==
Bo Abraham Mendel Rothstein was born in Malmö on 12 June 1954. His maternal grandparents arrived in Sweden from Lithuania and Ukraine around 1910, while his father was an Austrian-Jewish man who fled to Sweden to escape the Nazis in 1939. His paternal grandparents were murdered by the Nazis at the Chełmno extermination camp in 1942. He received his Ph.D. in political science from Lund University in 1986.

== Career ==
Between 1986 and 1995, Rothstein was an assistant professor at the Department of Government at Uppsala University. In 1992, he became an associate professor there. In 2004, he was awarded a six-year research grant for "long term support to leading scholars" from the Swedish Research Council. In 2009, he received a five-year grant from the Knut and Alice Wallenberg Foundation, the largest private research fund in Sweden. His current research interests are comparative quality of government institutions, social capital, and political corruption. In 2006, he served as a visiting professor at Harvard University. He then taught as a professor at the University of Gothenburg from 1995 to 2015. Together with Sören Holmberg, he is in charge of the Quality of Government Institute at University of Gothenburg. Since 2011, he is a member of the Swedish Government's advisory board for Research Policy.

In January 2016, Rothstein moved to England and joined the University of Oxford, where he was also given the title of Professorial Fellow of Nuffield College, Oxford. He has been a visiting scholar at the Russell Sage Foundation, Cornell University, Harvard University, Collegium Budapest Center for Advanced Study, the Swedish Collegium for Advanced Study, the Australian National University, Stanford University, and the University of Washington.

In 2017, Rothstein resigned from his professorship at the Blavatnik School of Government in protest at its namesake Leonard Blavatnik, due to Blavatnik's donations to Donald Trump. The dean voiced her disappointment with Rothstein's departure, stating that Blavatnik's only donation was to Trump's inaugural committee. Blavatnik had also donated to groups supporting Marco Rubio during the Republican Primaries. Rothstein said that the actions of the Trump administration run contrary to all that he has worked for as has done considerable research on the quality of political institutions, welfare politics, and corruption. In a letter to Oxford's Vice-Chancellor which was made public, he claimed that Oxford had stopped allocated him office space, students, and academic tasks following his protest.

Rothstein returned to Sweden, where he currently holds the August Röhss Chair in Political Science at University of Gothenburg.

== Writings ==
His books in English include:

- Making Sense of Corruption (Cambridge University Press, 2017, co-author: Aiysha Varraich)
- The Quality of Government: Corruption, Social Trust and Inequality in International Perspective (University of Chicago Press 2011)
- The Social Democratic State: the Swedish model and the bureaucratic problem of social reforms (University of Pittsburgh Press, 1996)
- Just Institutions Matter: The Moral and Political Logic of the Universal Welfare State (Cambridge Univ. Press 1998)
- Restructuring the welfare state: Political Institutions and Social Change (Palgrave/Macmillan 2002, co-editor: Sven Steinmo)
- Creating social trust in post-socialist transition (Palgrave/Macmillan 2004, co-editors: János Kornai and Susan Rose-Ackerman)
- Social Traps and the Problem of Trust (Cambridge University Press, 2005)

According to Google Scholar his scientific publishing has an h-index of 79.

Preceded by Bo Särlvik	August Röhss Professor in Political Science; 1995–2015	Incumbent
