= Emmy Rappe =

Swedish founder of nursing education

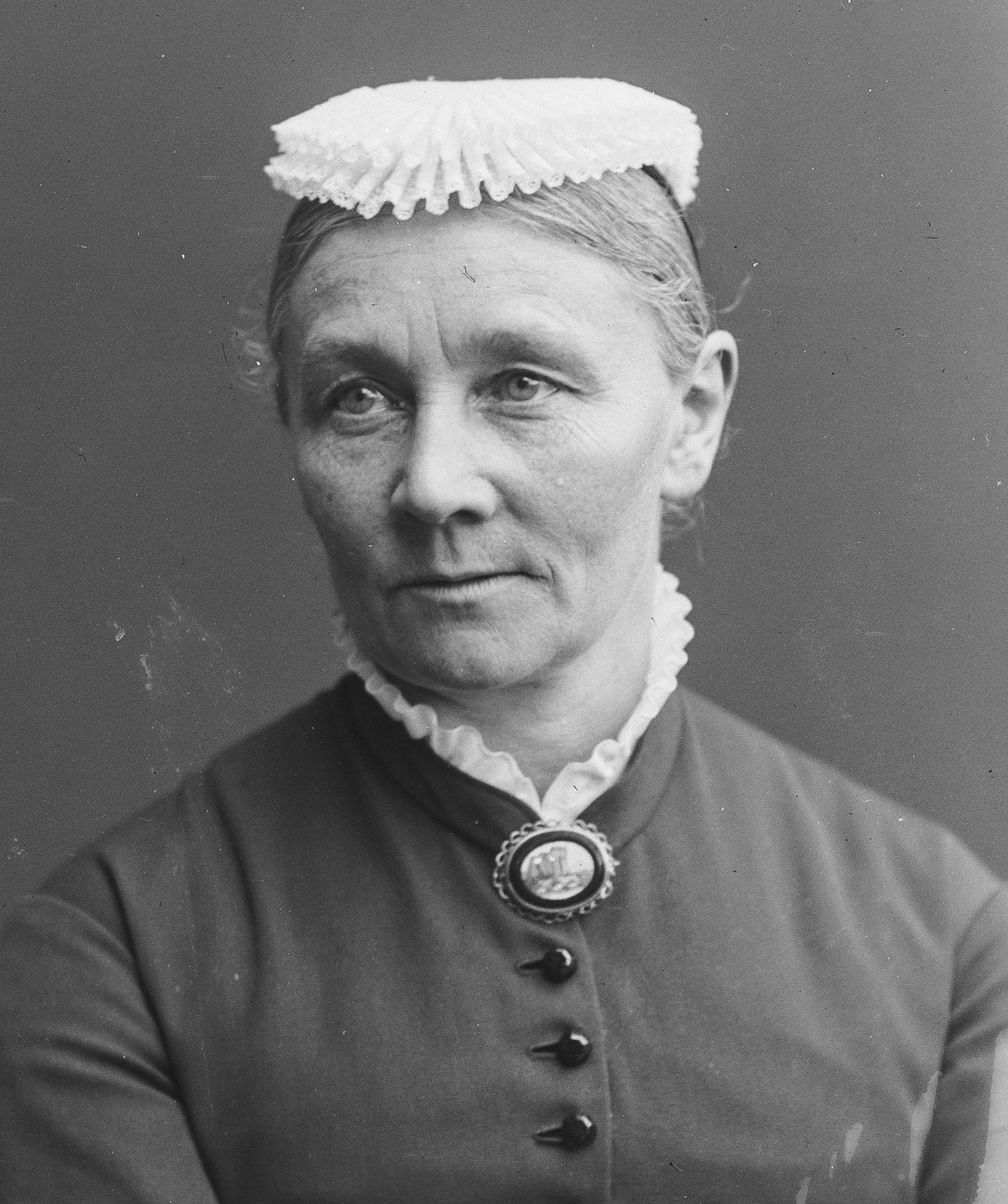
- Born: 14 February 1835; Ålem, Sweden
- Died: 19 October 1896 (aged 61); Dädesjö, Växjö, Sweden
- Occupations: Nurse and principal for a nursing school
- Known for: Pioneer and founder of the Swedish nursing education

Emmy Carolina Rappe (14 February 1835 – 19 October 1896) was a Swedish nurse and principal for a nursing school. She was the pioneer and founder of the Swedish nursing education. She was the first trained professional nurse and the first principal of the first nursing education in her country.

== Life ==
Rappe was born to landowner Baron Adolf Fredrik Rappe and Ulrika Catharina Wilhelmina Hammarskjöld. She was given a strict education where a sense of duty and a sensible economy were regarded as important, and being an unmarried noblewoman, she stayed under the supervision of her family until the age of thirty. She had an early interest in medicine and nursing. She was reportedly inspired by her aunt Elisabeth "Elise" Rappe.

In 1866, the newly established Swedish Red Cross wished to establish a nursing school in Sweden, and was in search for an educated principal to head the institution. Swedish publisher and women's rights activist Sophie Adlersparre made a deal with Florence Nightingale, that the person selected for the task should be educated by Nightingale in London, and then advertised for a suitable candidate in her publication Tidskrift för hemmet. Rappe was considered to be a suitable candidate to establish a proper school for the education of professional nurses in Sweden. She was sent as a student to Florence Nightingale's school Florence Nightingale School of Nursing and Midwifery at St Thomas' Hospital in London (now part of King's College London) in 1866. She was personally tutored by Nightingale, who was pleased with her as a student. Rappe shared the view that nursing was a calling.

Emmy Rappe returned to Sweden in 1867, and studied at Sahlgrenska sjukhuset hospital in Gothenburg and at others clinics in Stockholm. In 1867-1877, she was head nurse at the newly established Surgical Clinic at the Uppsala Academic Hospital, and principal of the nursing school there, which had been newly established by the Red Cross. This was the first secular training courses for nurses in Sweden: the only formal education previously available for nurses was the deaconess institution opened by Maria Cederschiöld in 1851.

Rappe was a pioneer, and was often met with resistance from the authorities. As a Baroness, she aroused controversy by engaging in such a profession, and she did, in fact, not accept any salary. She encouraged a sense of professional loyalty among nurses toward other nurses, and tried to raise the status of the profession by insisting on medical competence and high moral. In 1877–1886, she was supervisor for the Uppsala Central Hospital for the insane. After her retirement, she was active as a hospital inspector and within the Red Cross. Emmy Rappe was related to Thorborg Rappe, who was a contemporary authority in the education of Intellectual disability.

Emmy Rappe was awarded H. M. The King's Medal in 1877 and Illis Quorum in 1895.

== Legacy ==
A road on Ulleråker in Uppsala is named after her: Emmy Rappes väg (Emmy Rappe Street).

== See also ==
- Karolina Widerström, the first female physician graduated in Sweden.

== Literature ==
- 1977 – "God bless you, my dear miss Nightingale" : letters from Emmy Carolina Rappe to Florence Nightingale 1867–1870 ISBN 91-22-00097-6
