= Röhsska Museum =

Museum in Gothenburg, Sweden

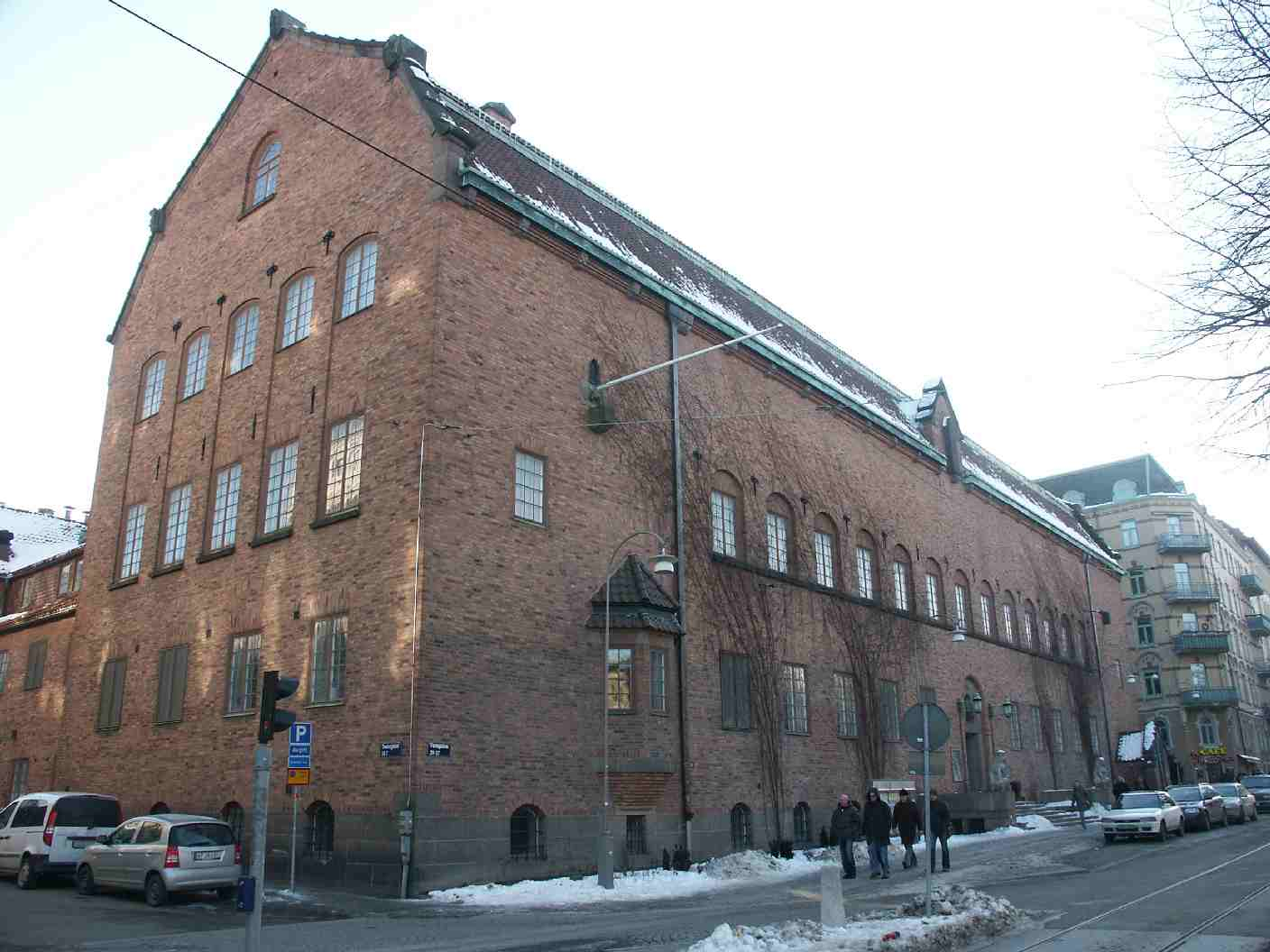
- Röhsska Museum

General information
- Architectural style: National Romantic
- Location: Gothenburg, Sweden
- Coordinates: 57°42′0″N 11°58′24″E
- Construction started: 1910
- Completed: 1914
- Client: The City of Gothenburg

Design and construction
- Architect: Carl Westman

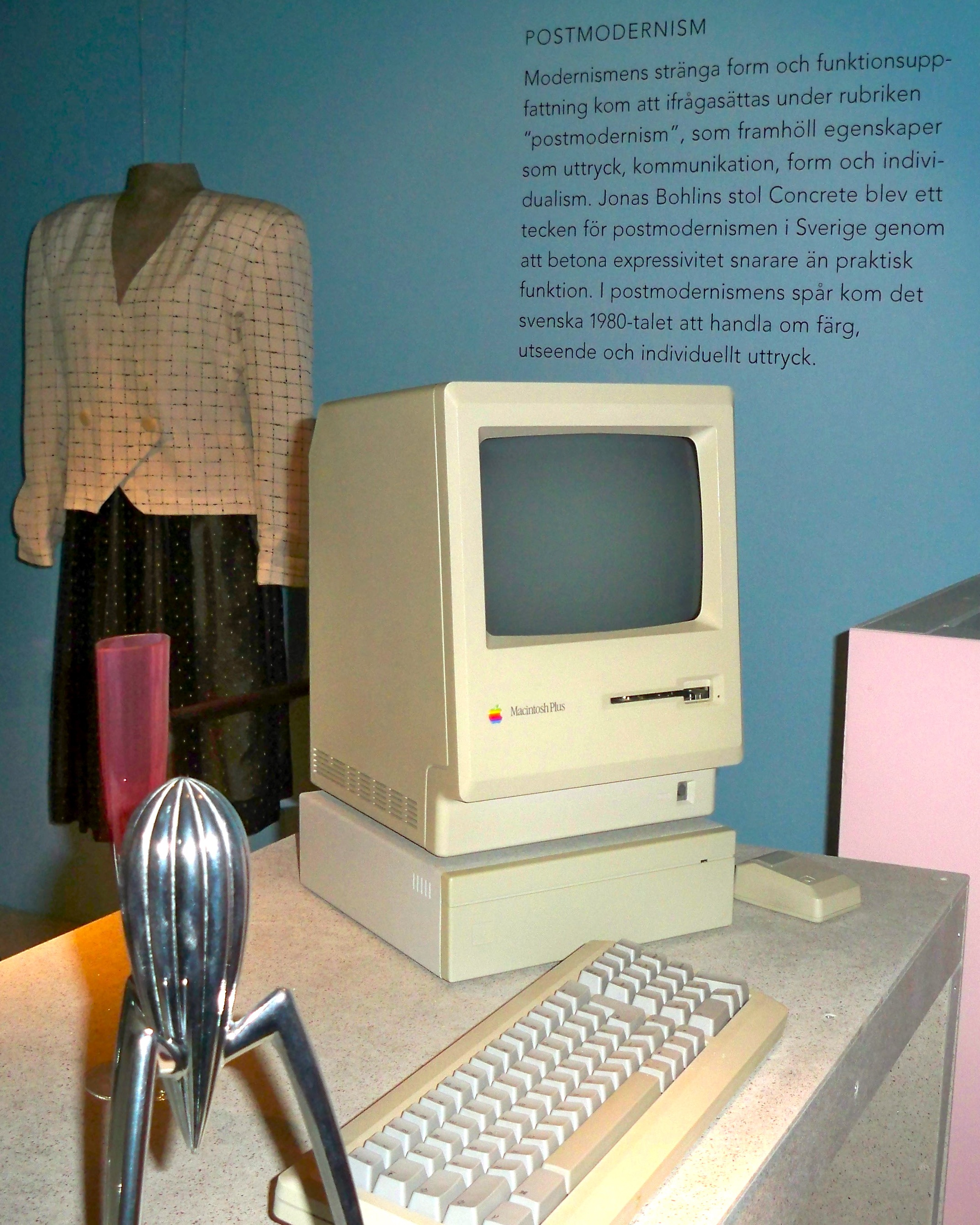
Macintosh Plus at the Design Museum in Gothenburg, Sweden

The Röhsska Museum (Swedish: Röhsska museet, earlier named Röhsska konstslöjdsmuseet), also known as Design Museum, is located in Gothenburg, Sweden. It is a museum focused on design, fashion and applied arts.

The museum collection consists of over 50,000 objects. The majority of the collection consists of handicraft and design products from Sweden and Europe and arts and crafts from Japan and China. The museum also holds a very fine collection of fashion from the 20th and 21st centuries, including many haute couture garments from Paris and other famous fashion designs from all over the world. Today, the Röhsska Museum mainly collects contemporaneous material and the museum seeks to achieve a dialogue with its users on contemporary phenomena and expressions.

== History ==
The Röhsska Museum was founded in 1904. The financial foundation was a donation from the estate of Wilhelm Röhss in 1901, and in the ensuing years, further donations were made by people including his brother, August Röhss. The original building, clad in red, hand-made brick was designed by architect Carl Westman in the National Romantic style. In 1916 the museum was opened to the public.

The museum's first curator was Axel Nilsson, who also participated in the construction of the museum. The curators that succeeded him were Gustaf Munthe in 1924, Göran Axel-Nilsson in 1946, Jan Brunius in 1972, Christian Axel-Nilsson in 1986, Helena Dahlbäck Lutteman in 1996, Lasse Brunnström in 1998, Elsebeth Welander-Berggren in 2000 and Ted Hesselbom in 2007. In January 2013 Tom Hedqvist was appointed as the new Museum Director.

Textile specialist Vivi Sylwan was head of the museum's textile department from 1914 to 1941.

== See also ==
- List of design museums
