= Thorborg Rappe =

Swedish pedagogue

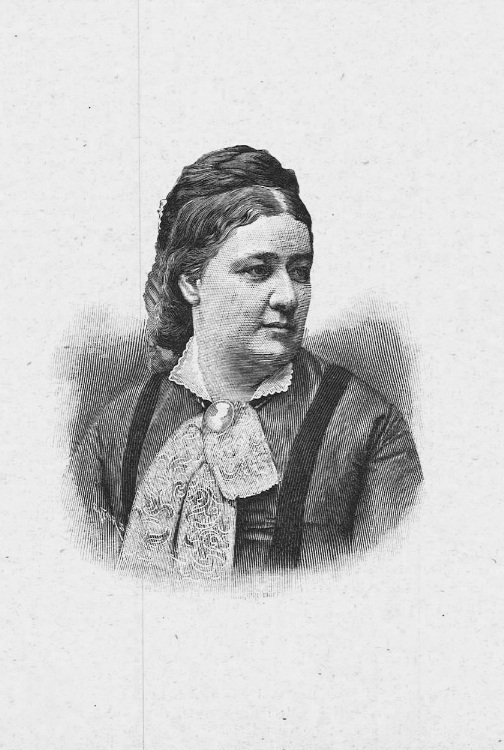
- Born: 4 October 1832; Nättraby, Sweden
- Died: 18 September 1902 (aged 69)
- Burial place: Nättraby cemetery
- Occupations: Educator; School founder
- Known for: Pioneer in the education of students with Intellectual disability
- Spouse: Carl August Rappe

Thorborg Ragnhild Rappe (4 October 1832 – 18 September 1902), was a Swedish pedagogue and Baroness. Alongside Emanuella Carlbeck, she is counted as a pioneer in the education of students with intellectual disability in Sweden, and she represented her country at the 1893 Congress of Women in Chicago.

== Life ==
Thorborg Rappe was born to a noble courtier Fredrik Rappe and Charlotta Danielsson, and related to Emmy Rappe, the pioneer of nursing education in Sweden. Rappe was born at her maternal grandfather's Marielund estate in Nättraby parish near Karlskrona. Rappe was raised on the manor of her parents, and married her cousin baron Carl August Rappe (1828–1877) in 1854 at age 21. Until 1868, she lived on the manor of her spouse, but after the great famine of 1867-1869, her spouse was financially ruined and had to sell his estate and work as a civil servant, dying in 1877. After Rappe was widowed, she moved to Stockholm.

In 1878, with the help of women's rights activist Sophie Adlersparre, Rappe was appointed director of a new school in Norrtullsgatan for mentally disadvantaged children (then widely known as idiots) in Stockholm organized by several prominent individuals. She acquired a teaching style that emphasized child stimulation at an early age. From 1878 to 1891, she served as the school principal, and from 1891 until her death, she was manager of a home for females with the same disability.

Rappe was the author of the first Swedish book about the education of children born with intellectual disabilities, which became influential and was long used in Sweden. Rappe had skill with several languages, especially English, French and German.

She emphasized that teaching should focus on each individual student.

Teaching should be focused on the individual and it should be based on a given child’s level of development and particular enthusiasm and ability. A lot of emphasis was placed on practising practical skills. The atmosphere at the school was to be welcoming and encouraging. Thorborg Rappe believed – in deference to the foreign institutions she had visited – that an institution should include a school, a workhouse, and an “idiothem” (home for idiots).

Director of the school for 12 years, Rappe resigned from the school and moved on to training new teachers, which she did until her death. With her resignation, she was replaced as director by Baroness Estrid Rappe.

=== Chicago ===
In 1893, she was also the Swedish representative at the Congress of Women held at the World's Columbian Exposition in Chicago.

Thorborg Rappe died in 1902 and was buried at Nättraby cemetery.

== Selected works ==
- Några råd och anvisningar vid sinnesslöa barns (idioters) vård. Uppfostran och undervisning (1903, in German 1904)
- Arbetshemmet för qvinliga idioter. Utkast (1892)
- En studieresa. Berättelse (1888)

== See also ==
- Sophia Wilkens
