= Tobin Im =

South Korean scholar and professor

- Born: January 7, 1961 (age 65)
- Education: l'Institut d'Études Politiques de Paris
- Known for: Government Competitiveness
- Scientific career
- Fields: Public Administration
- Workplaces: Seoul National University; George Washington University l'Institut d'Études Politiques de Paris; Indiana University-Purdue University Indianapolis

Tobin Im (born Jan 7, 1961) is a scholar of public administration and a professor at the Graduate School of Public Administration at Seoul National University. He specializes in public management, organization theory, and comparative administration.

== Career ==
Im received his B.A. and M.P.A. from Seoul National University in 1983 and 1985. He completed his Ph.D. at the l'Institut d'Études Politiques de Paris (Sciences-Po), earning his sociology doctorate in 1993. He joined the Seoul National Univ. faculty in 1999. He was a visiting professor at the George Washington University (2000), Chinese Young Men's College (2001), University of Otago (2002), l'Institut d'Études Politiques de Paris (2005), Indiana University-Purdue University Indianapolis (2006). and George Mason University (2012). In 2015, he served as president of Korean Association of Public Administration, for which now he is a chief editor since 2019. He is also an editor of Journal of Public Administration Research and Theory and Public Performance & Management Review. The American Review of Public Administration conferred its annual Best ARPA Article award to Alfred Tat-Kei Ho and Tobin Im for "Challenges in Building Effective and Competitive Government in Developing Countries: An Institutional Logics Perspective." in 2016. He received the Best Researcher Award in Seoul National University in 2017

Tobin Im has become Dean of Graduate School of Public Administration (GSPA) at Seoul National University in 2018. The Ministry of Education awarded him Outstanding Performance Award for Academic Support Project for "The Two Sides of Korean Administrative Culture: Competitiveness or Collectivism?" GSPA ranks 11th in QS World University Rankings Social Policy & Administration in 2021.

== Research interest ==
Im is currently studying government competitiveness, winning research grant by Korea Research Foundation. He creates a new concept, government competitiveness, which has been interchangeably used with a host of similar concepts, such as national competitiveness, government efficiency, and government effectiveness. Im serves as director of Center for Government Competitiveness developing a GC indicator which makes cross-national analyses available.

== Publications ==
- Im, Tobin (1993). "L'administration de l'etat face a la decentralisation : l'évolution du système d'action des prefectures". Institut d'Études Politiques de Paris: 364–370.
- Im, Tobin (2003). "Bureaucratic Power and the NPM Reforms in Korea". International Review of Public Administration. 8 (1): 89–102. doi:10.1080/12294659.2003.10805020. S2CID 154306420.
- Im, Tobin (2008). "An Exploratory Study of Time Stress and Its Causes among Government Employees". Public Administration Review. 69 (1): 104–115. doi:10.1111/j.1540-6210.2008.01944.x.
- Im, Tobin & Lee, Seung Jong (2012). "Does Management Performance Impact Citizen Satisfaction?". The American Review of Public Administration. 42 (4): 419–436. doi:10.1177/0275074011408589. S2CID 153652355.
- Ho, A. & Im, T (2013a). "Challenges in Building Effective and Competitive Government in Developing Countries: An Institutional Logics Perspective". The American Review of Public Administration. first published online.
- Stephan Grimmelikhuijsen; Gregory Porumbescu; Boram Hong; Tobin Im (2013b). "The Effect of Transparency on Trust in Government: A Cross-National Comparative Experiment". Public Administration Review. 73 (4): 575–586. doi:10.1111/puar.12047. hdl:1874/302987.
- Tobin Im; Wonhyuk Cho; Greg Porumbescu; Jungho Park (2013c). "Revisiting Confucian Bureaucracy: Roots of the Korean Government's culture and competitiveness". Public Administration and Development. 33 (4): 286–296. doi:10.1002/pad.1656.
- Tobin Im, Jesse W.Campbell & Seyeong Cha (2014). "Internet, Trust in Government, and Citizen Compliance". Journal of Public Administration Research and Theory. 24 (3): 741–763. doi:10.1093/jopart/mus037. S2CID 73696408.
