= Magna Sunnerdahl =

Swedish philanthropist

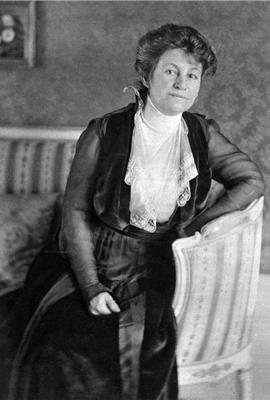
Magna Sunnerdahl

Magna Charlotta Katarina Sunnerdahl (1863–1935) was a Swedish philanthropist. On inheriting a huge fortune when her father died in 1908, she founded a number of boarding schools for needy children known as Sunnerdahls Hemskolor. From 1914, she made a series of donations to the city of Stockholm for the construction of low-rental apartments to house working-class families with several children.

== Biography ==
Born on 26 May 1863 in Stockholm, Magna Charlotta Katarina Sunnerdahl was the daughter of the wholesale merchant Anders Petter Emil Sunnerdahl (1826–1908) and Hedda Ulrike née Francke (1836–1865). She lost her mother when she was only two in connection with the birth of her brother who died when he was 18. She lived with her father for the rest of his life in their home in Stockholm's Drottninggatan or their summer residence in Bromma. When her father died in August 1908, he had not made a will. As a result, she inherited his fortune of SEK 9 million, an enormous sum at the time.

Shortly after her father's death, she made a donation of SEK 4 million to the church ministry for establishing boarding schools known as Sunnerdahl Schools where less fortunate children from the cities could be constructively educated in the country. The first school opened in 1911 in the Låssa district of Upplands-Bro Municipality with 30 carefully selected pupils, 16 girls and 14 boys. By 1916, over 100 pupils were being educated in several establishments. Subjects included agriculture, gardening and handicrafts while the girls learnt housekeeping, child care and sewing.

In 1913, she made a further donation of SEK 500,000 to the Swedish Academy for purchasing the top floors of the Stockholm Stock Exchange Building so that it could hold its meetings there. In 1914, 1928 and 1935, she made donations to the city of Stockholm for the construction of five residential buildings on Södermalm which needy families with children could rent at reasonable rates.

Magna Sunnerdahl lived on Naravägen in central Stockholm with her friend and relative Elisabet Lincke who died in 1923. Sunnerdahl continued to live there until her death on 9 August 1935, when she left about SEK 2.5 million, principally for the Sunnerdahl schools but also for the Swedish Academy.

== Awards ==
In 1924, Magna Summerdahl was awarded the Illis quorum medal for her philanthropic activities.
