= Matilda Widegren =

Swedish educator (1863–1938)

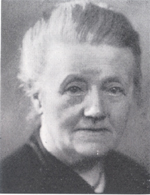
Matilda Widegren

Maria Matilda Aurora Widegren (1863–1938) was a Swedish educator and peace activist. A delegate for Sweden at the 1915 International Congress of Women held in The Hague, she helped establish the Swedish branch of the International League for Peace and Freedom, serving as president from 1919 to 1934. She was active in other peace organizations, becoming a board member of the Nordic Teachers Peace Association, chair of Swedish School Peace Union (Svenska skolornas fredsförbund) and a council member of the Nordic Association for International Cooperation on Peace (Nordiska föreningen mellanfolkligt samarbete för fred).

== Early life and education ==
Born in Söderköping on 7 August 1863, Maria Matilda Aurora Widegren was the daughter of the school principal Per Mauritz August Widegren (1815–1899) and his wife Aurora Fredrika née Steinnordh (1828–1879). In 1879, after her mother's death, she moved with her father to Stockholm where she attended the normal school for girls. She went on to spend three years at the Royal Seminary (HLS) where she graduated in the mid-1880s. In 1893, she spent a further year taking special studies at the HLS.

== Career ==
From 1904 until her retirement in 1923, Widegren was a teacher at HLS. She contributed to a number of text books, including one on Swedish grammar in 1896 that was published until the mid-1900s. A trip to the United States in 1904 allowed her to return with many new ideas about teaching.

Widegren was also interested in the women's peace movement. In 1915, she was one of 16 women who represented Sweden at the International Congress of Women held in The Hague. Following the organization's 1919 congress in Zürich, Widegren was an initiator of Internationella Kvinnoförbundet för Fred och Frihet, the Swedish branch of the Women's International League for Peace and Freedom, serving as chair from 1919 to 1934. She also served on the board of the Nordic Teachers' Peace Association and was a council member of the Nordic Association for International Cooperation for Peace. She also chaired the Swedish School Peace Union.

For her contributions to the cause for peace, in 1923 she was honoured with the Illis quorum.

Widegren died in Stockholm on 2 February 1938 and was buried at Hedvig Eleonora Church.

== See also ==
- List of peace activists
