= Sophia Wilkens =

Swedish educator (1817–1889)

- Born: December 14, 1817; Kristianstad, Sweden
- Died: March 22, 1889 (aged 71); Blekinge, Sweden
- Occupations: Educator, social reformer
- Known for: Pioneer in the education of students with intellectual disability

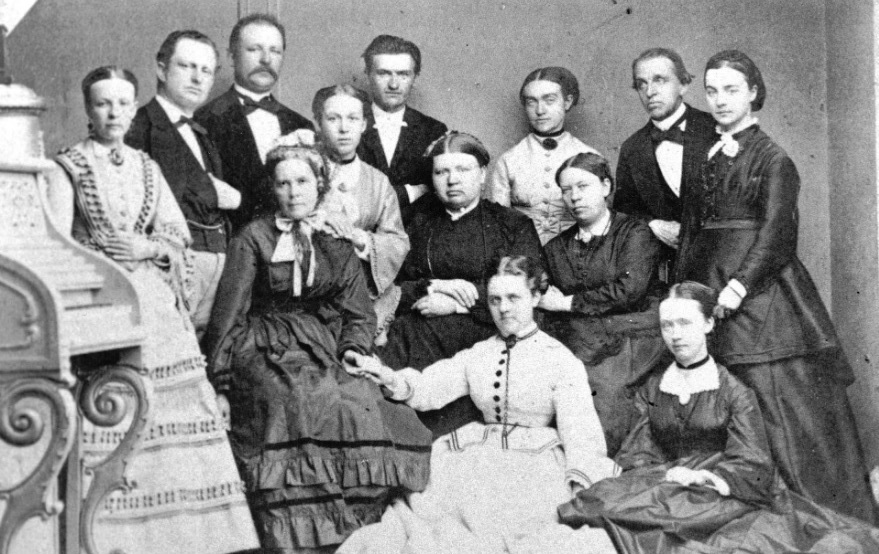
Wilkens, middle row, center, at a pedagogical meeting in Copenhagen (1872)

Sofia Charlotta Wilkens (née Thomée; December 14, 1817 – March 22, 1889) was a Swedish pedagogue. She is counted as a pioneer in the education of students with intellectual disability, as well as deaf and mute students. She founded the Deaf and Mute Institute in Karlskrona, a combined orphanage, training school and working home for pupils with physical and intellectual disabilities, and was its manager from 1859 to 1877.

== Background ==
Sophia Wilkens was born in Kristianstad, Sweden. Her father, Per Thomée (1780–1843) was a county governor and government official. Her mother, Maria Juliana Wideman (1797–1826) died when Sophia was eight years old. She was raised by her maternal grandmother in Karlskrona. She was the cousin of Johan Henrik Thomander (1798–1865), Bishop of the Diocese of Lund, and belonged to the social upper classes of Karlskrona, a notable city in Sweden in the mid-19th century. As was fashionable among upper-class females of her time, she was active as a social reformer through philanthropy. In 1838, she married Rudolf Wilkens (1809–1897) and settled in Karlshamn. They raised a family but lost their youngest child, Thomina, who died of scarlet fever at the age of four.

== Career ==
Between the years 1850–1877, she established three facilities in Karlskrona: the Children's Home (Barnhemmet), Deaf Institute (Dövstuminstitutet) and Protection Center (Skyddshemmet) which received people from throughout Southern Sweden. In 1859, she was given the care of an intellectually disabled girl. The same year, she founded her own orphanage. In 1864, the commune decided to do something for the deaf and mute of the county and her school, being the only one in existence, were given financial support. The following year, it was moved into new localities, and from 1868 onward, it was given governmental support.

At this point in time, there had been combined schools and homes for deaf and mute children in Sweden since the pioneer work of Pär Aron Borg, who founded Manillaskolan in Stockholm. While there were no schools for intellectually disabled children, and the care for them was in fact not developed at all, they were often included in the schools for deaf and mute children. Thereby, it was natural for Wilkens to receive children with both physical as well as intellectual handicaps at the same school. However, through experience of the education of children with different forms of handicaps together, she developed the conviction that it was healthy for the intellectually disabled to be tutored along with children with normal development.

Wilkens became a strong spokesperson inclusion: she believed that the intellectually disabled should not be institutionalized, but rather be educated with the goal to be included in public society as self-supporting and valuable professionals. Her combined orphanage and school were therefore not an institution were people were placed for life, as the other institutions founded during the second half of the 19th century, but a home were the pupils were educated and trained to be released to function in society.

After confirmation, she arranged employment for the students. The males were often successfully employed within handicrafts or with the Royal Navy. However, it was more difficult to find employment for females, especially since Wilkens would like to protect them from the fear of abuse. Therefore, she founded an adjoining working home, Skyddshem för abnorma flickor (1869–1911), where the majority of her female former students were employed manufacturing textiles; it became very successful and managed to support itself.

This was controversial in a period when intellectually disabled people were regarded to be of no use for society, and authorities therefore generally considered it to be the task of private charity to care for them rather than the state. From 1870s, she participated in the Nordic pedagogical meetings for the schooling of the disabled. A pioneer, she stated that as she had no support from science, she had to rely on her own experience, and that compassion had taught her that the disabled could and should be tutored to manage on their own rather than to be institutionalized.

Wilkens ran the establishments until 1877, when she turned 60. In 1890, the deaf institute was integrated into the county system. Public support was established for the other institutions; for the school in 1907 and the work shelter in 1911. The children's home was discontinued in 1957. In retirement, she lived on a farm in the parish of Augerum in Blekinge County.

== Awards ==
She was awarded the Swedish royal medal Illis quorum meruere labores (commonly called Illis Quorum) in 1873.

== Legacy ==
Alongside Emanuella Carlbeck, Wilkens was one of the two pioneers in the education of the intellectually disabled in Sweden in the mid-19th century, when the education and care of this category was developed in Europe, in contrast to other nations where the pioneers were normally male. However, it was to be Carlbeck whose ideas were to set the pattern for treatment in Sweden in the following decades. Carlbeck and Wilkens represented two contrasting lines in the education of the intellectually disabled: while Carlbeck focused on giving them humane treatment for life in an institution, Wilkens contested institutionalization and spoke for inclusion of this category of patients within society, and education to help them become self-supporting members of society. Wilkens' methods were too progressive for the 19th century, when education and care at all was considered controversial, and her ideas were not to be given much support until the second half of the 20th century.

== See also ==
- Thorborg Rappe

== Other sources ==
- Owe Røren (2007) Idioternas tid Tankestilar inom den tidiga idiotskolan 1840–1872 (Stockholm University) ISBN 978-91-7155-508-3
- Wilkens, Sten (1995) Sofia Charlotta Wilkens född Thomée, en minnesteckning (Blekingesamlingen, Karlskrona stadsbibliotek)

== Related reading ==
- Kaleb Teodor Lindstedt – dövstum i Kristianopel av Erik Lindstedt och Gunvor Cerne
- Växjö universitet. Institutionen för pedagogik. Elisabet Frithiof. Paper till Pedagogikhistorisk forskningskonferens i Stockholm, LHS, 2006-09-28- – 29. Session 2: Bildning, kultur och makt
