= Dina Schneidermann =

Ukrainian violinist (1931–2016)

- Born: 1930 or 1931; Odessa, USSR (present-day Ukraine)
- Died: 9 August 2016; Uppsala, Sweden
- Genres: Classical
- Occupation: Violinist

Dina Schneidermann (1930 or 1931 – 9 August 2016) was a Ukrainian-Swedish violinist who studied violin with David Oistrakh in Moscow. Schneidermann was born in Odessa, USSR. Having married the Bulgarian violin professor Emil Kamilarov (1928–2007), Schneidermann moved to Bulgaria. The couple left Bulgaria in the 1980s, and moved to Uppsala, Sweden, where they lived for the rest of their lives.

Schneidermann worked as a solo violinist and music teacher, and toured extensively in Europe, America and Eastern Asia, often together with Emil Kamilarov as Duo Deschka. She performed on the Il Cannone Guarnerius several times, most recently in 1996 at a concert in Uppsala.

Schneidermann won first prizes at violin concerts in Berlin and Geneva. Several contemporary composers, including Dmitry Kabalevsky, Pancho Vladigerov, Dimitar Christov, Luigi Cortese, Inger Wikström, Håkan Larsson, and Horst Ebenhöh, created music pieces written for her and dedicated to her.

In 2002, Schneidermann was awarded the Illis quorum medal in gold, for her "long and important work within the Swedish music scene" ([f]ör sina mångåriga och betydelsefulla insatser inom svenskt musikliv). She was also awarded a Doctor Honoris Causa at the University and Academy of Music in Sofia, Bulgaria, in 1997.

In 2011, Dina Schneidermann was initiator of the Prof. Emil Kamilarov International Music Festival set in Sofia, Bulgaria, which stages concerts from renowned musicians as well as a multinational competition of young violin talents. The festival takes place annually, beginning on 22 October lasting for a week.

Schneidermann died on 9 August 2016, in Uppsala, Sweden.
