= Aurore Grandien =

Swedish educator, journalist, newspaper editor, and publisher

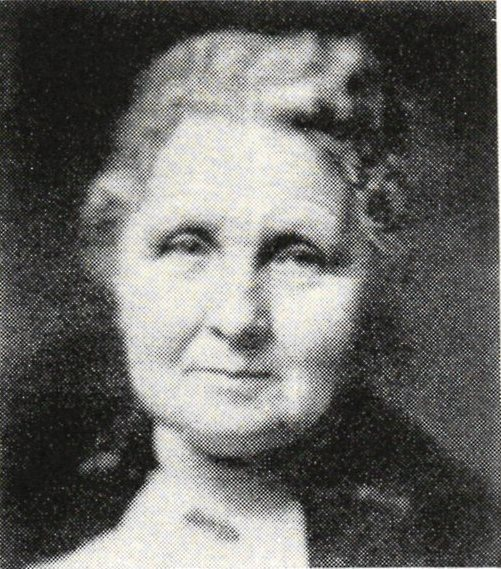
- Grandien
- Born: Anna Aurore Leonida Grandien; 4 October 1857; Gävle, Sweden
- Died: 2 February 1940 (aged 82); Söderhamn, Sweden
- Occupations: Educator; journalist; newspaper editor; publisher

Anna "Aurore" Leonida Grandien (4 October 1857 – 2 February 1940) was a Swedish educator, journalist, newspaper editor, and publisher. She served as the chief editor and publisher of the newspaper Söderhamns Tidning. In 1927, she was awarded the Swedish royal medal Illis quorum in recognition of her career as an editor and publisher.

== Life ==
Aurore Grandien was born on 4 October 1857 in Gävle, Sweden. She was the oldest child of Anna Margareta Norbohm (née Holmgren) and Martin Leonard Norbohm, a weaver at the Strömsbro cotton mill. As a child, Grandien had the responsibility of taking care of two younger siblings: Karl and Bertha. From 1877 to 1878, she attended the primary school teacher training college in Bollnäs. Between 1878 and 1884, she worked as a teacher in Österfärnebo and in Gävle. At a school meeting, she met Rudolf Grandien who was a teacher at the Söderhamn grammar school, as well as the editor of the newspaper Söderhamns Tidning. They married in 1885, and Aurore was appointed the editor.

Söderhamns Tidning was a liberal newspaper and published articles on literary, cultural, and musical topics. After the death of her husband in 1904, Grandien became the editor-in-chief and publisher of the publication. In 1913, she took over the printing and the bookbinding workshops. Originally a two-day newspaper, Grandien worked to expand the business and modernise the company, and Söderhamns Tidning subsequently became a daily publication. She retired from the editor-in-chief post at the age of 70. In 1927, she was honoured with the Swedish royal medal Illis quorum in recognition of her career as an editor and publisher. In 1938, she was granted an honorary member of the Swedish newspaper publishers' association, Tidningsutgivarna.

Grandien died in Ängelholm, on 2 February 1940.
