= Hedvig Eleonora Church =

Church in Stockholm, Sweden

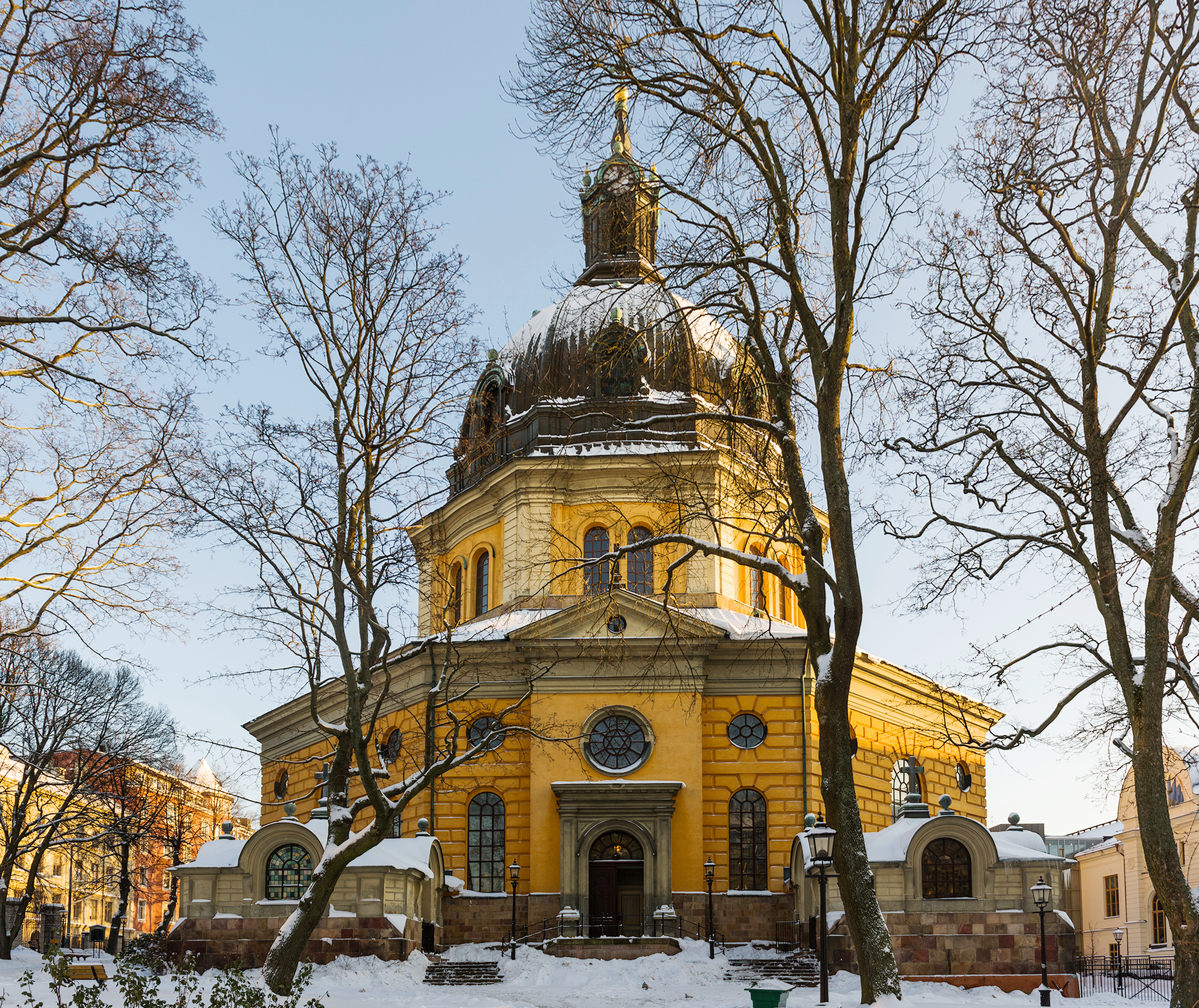
- Hedvig Eleonora Church in December 2012

Religion
- Affiliation: Church of Sweden
- Rite: Lutheran
- Ecclesiastical or organisational status: Parish church
- Year consecrated: 21 August 1737

Location
- Location: Stockholm, Sweden
- Interactive map of Hedvig Eleonora Church
- Coordinates: 59°20′07″N 18°04′50″E

Architecture
- Style: Baroque

Hedvig Eleonora Church (Swedish: Hedvig Eleonora kyrka) is an Evangelical-Lutheran church in central Stockholm, Sweden. It is located at Östermalm and belongs to the Church of Sweden and is parish church for Hedvig Eleonora Parish in the Diocese of Stockholm.

The church was consecrated on 21 August 1737 and is named after the Swedish Queen Hedvig Eleonora (1636–1715), wife of King Charles X of Sweden. Hedvig Eleonora Church is an octagonal church.

The church is one of Stockholm's most popular for weddings, christenings and funerals.

The building contains a 24-bell carillon, built by the Bergholtz Bellfoundry in 1968

== Notable interments ==
- Lasse Berghagen (1945–2023), singer
- Tim Bergling (Avicii) (1989–2018), producer and DJ
- Matilda Widegren (1863–1938), educator and peace activist

== Gallery ==
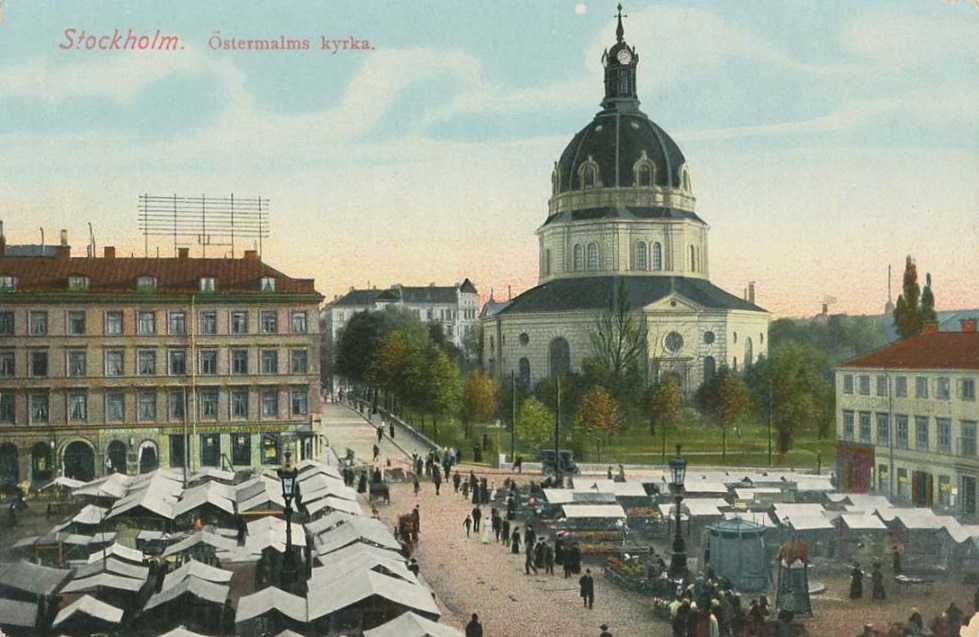
Hedvig Eleonora Church in 1900

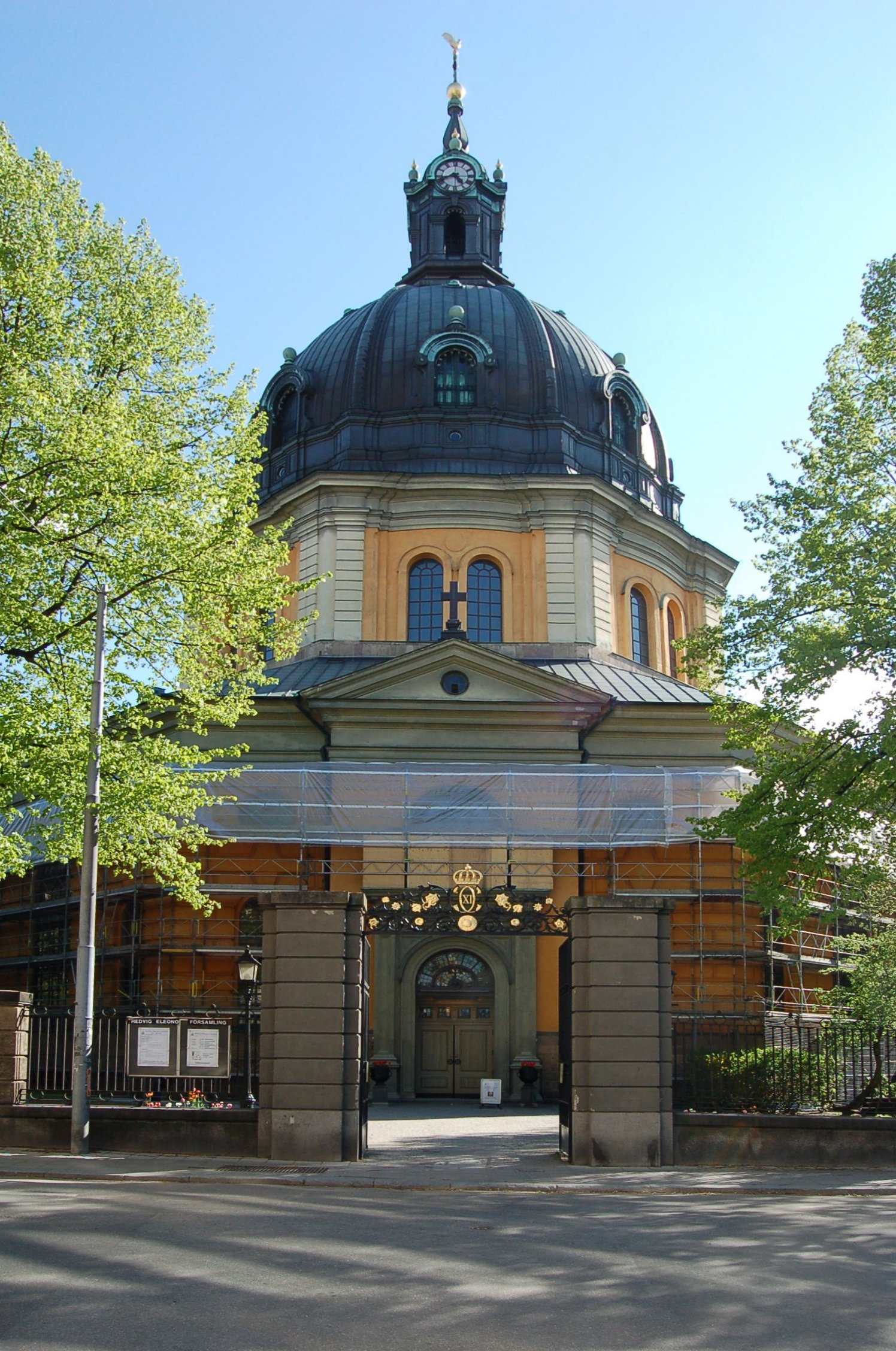
Exterior

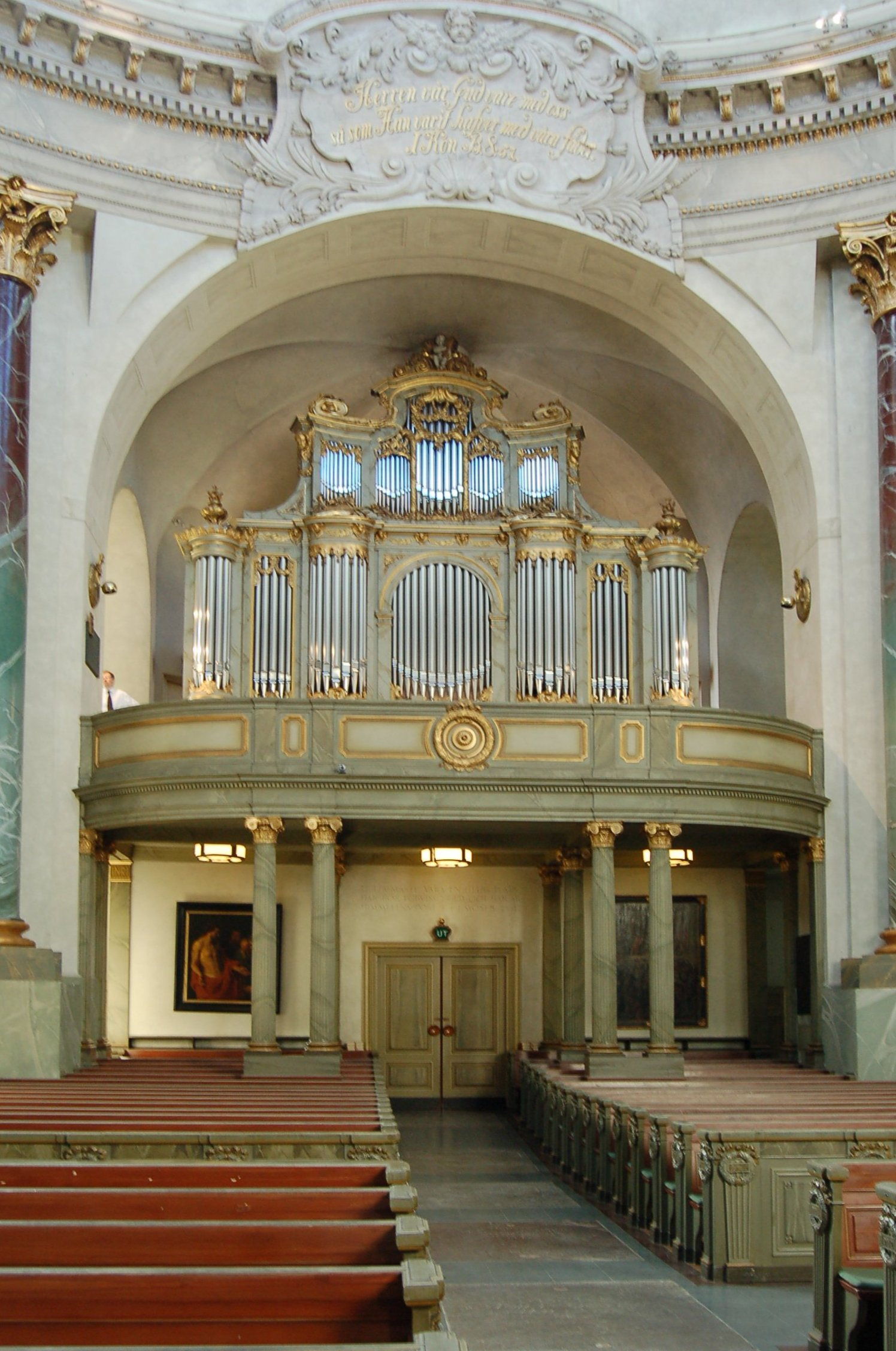
Organ

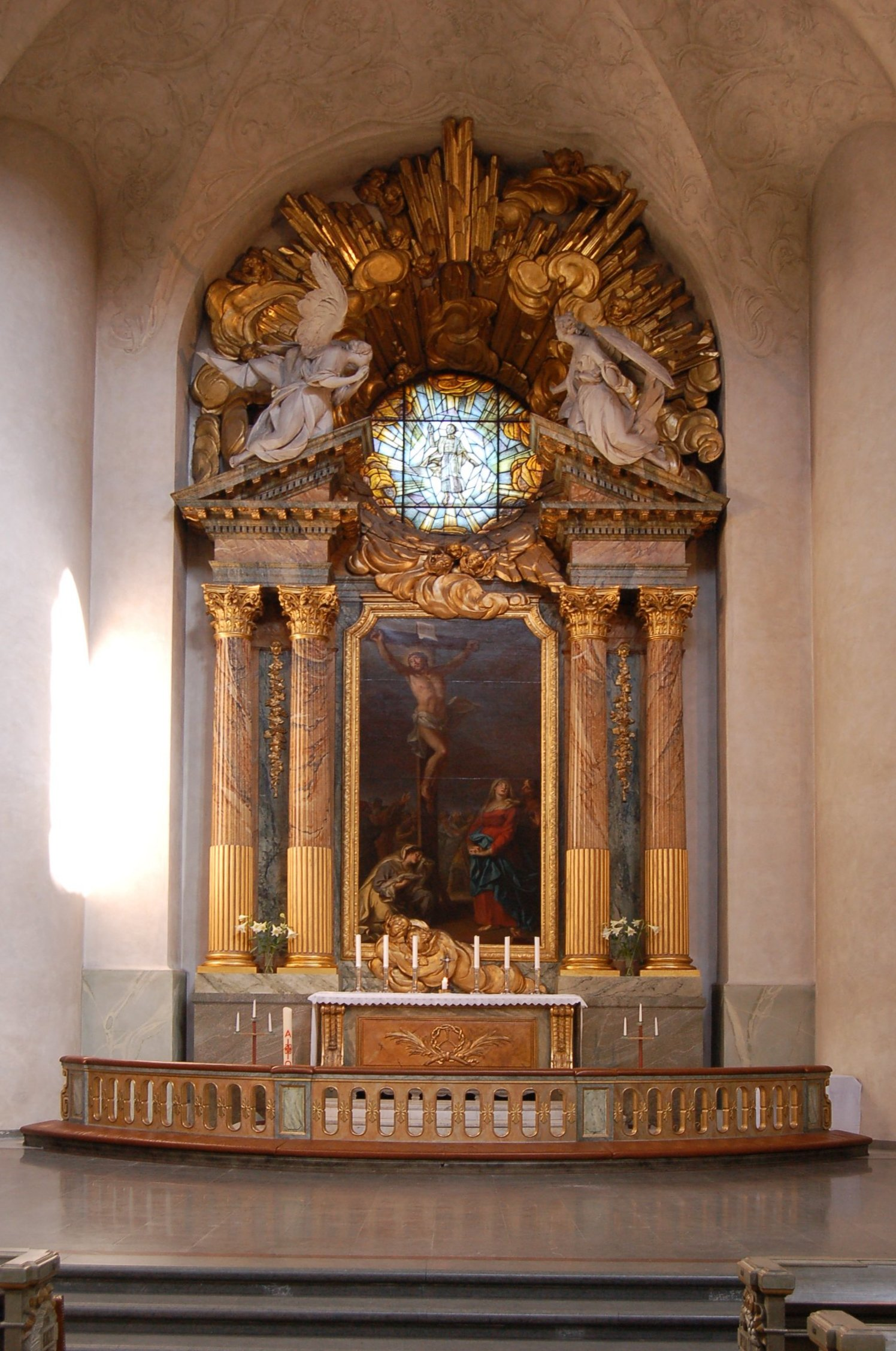
Altar

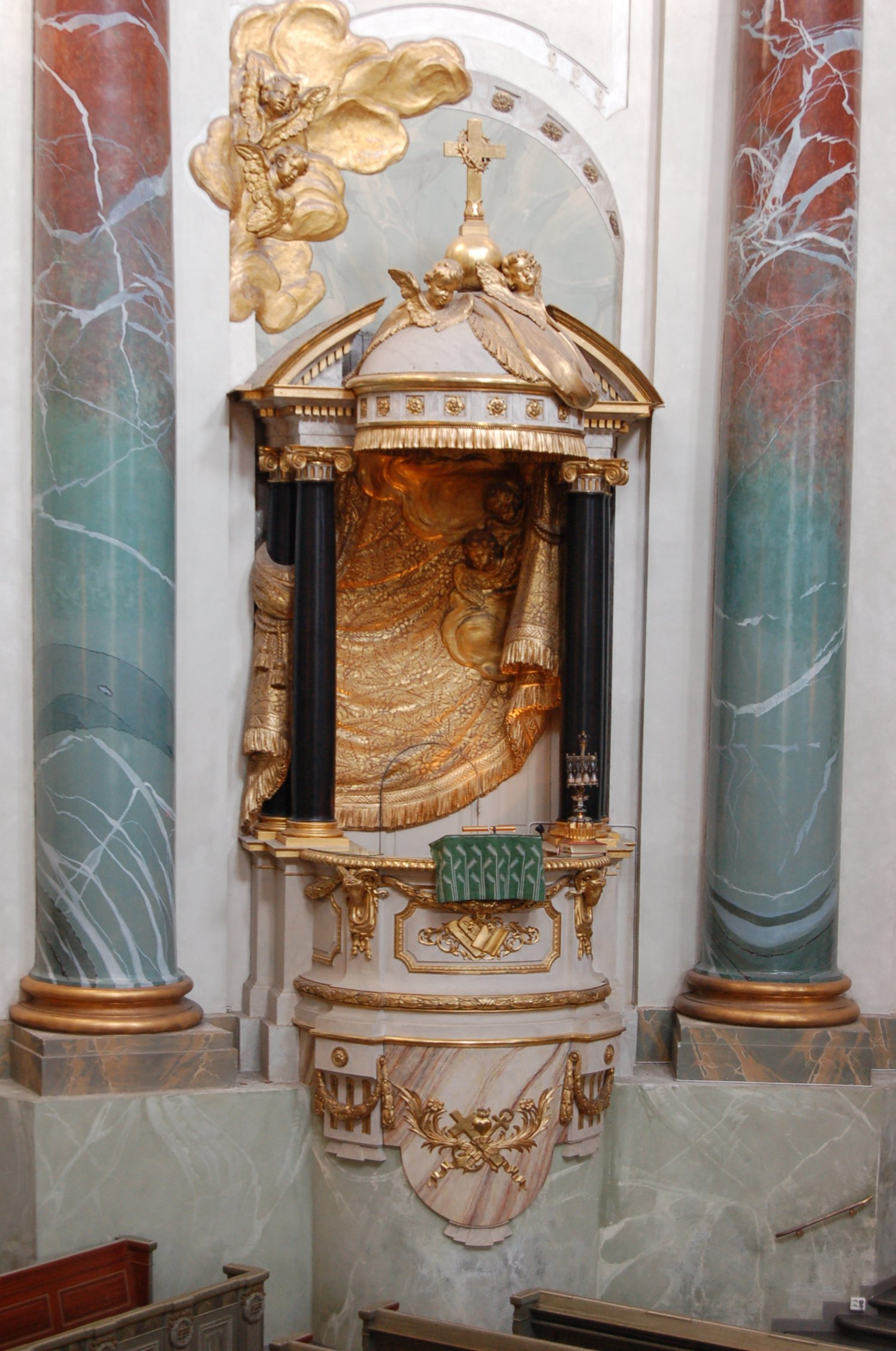
Pulpit

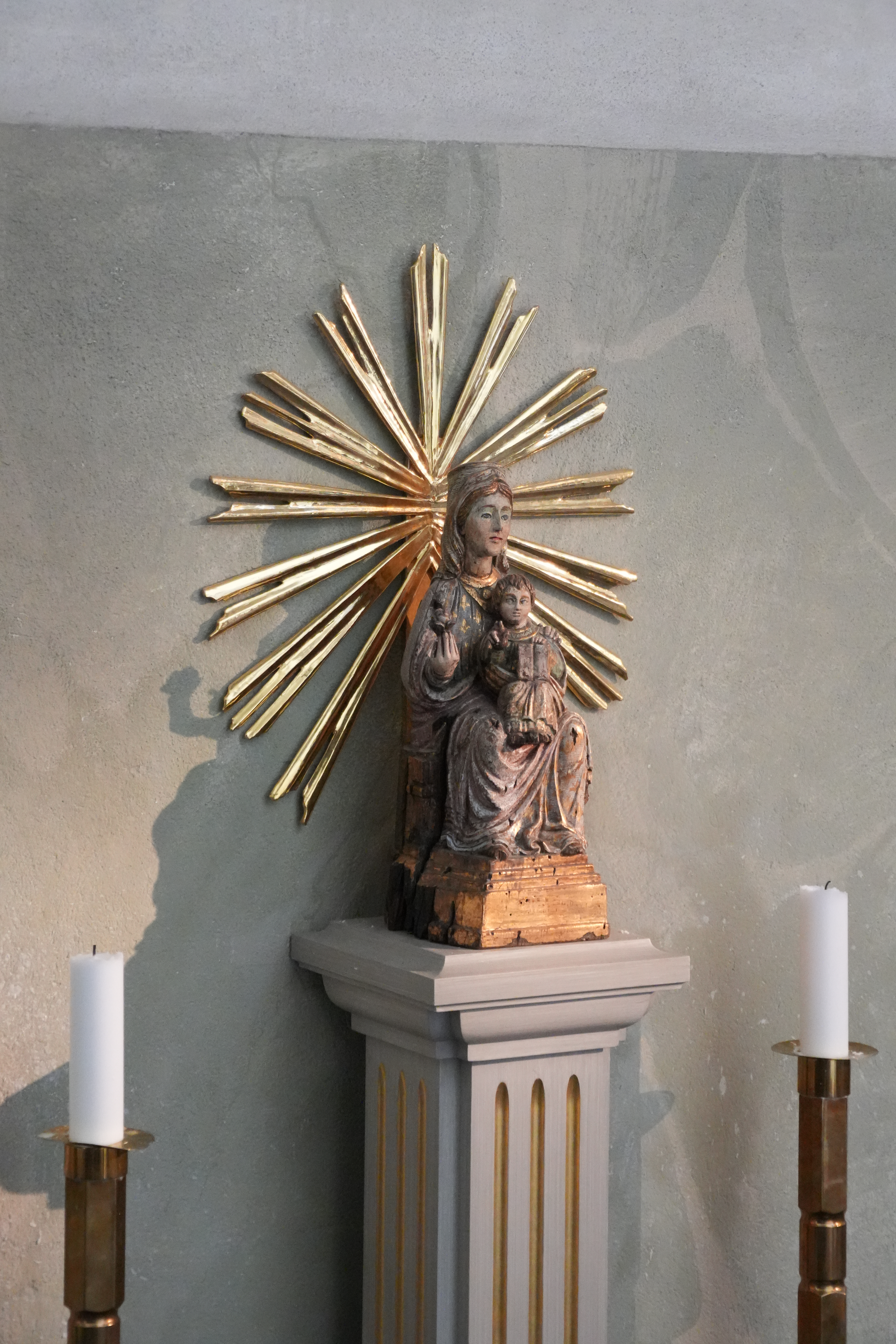
Statue of the Blessed Virgin Mary at a side altar

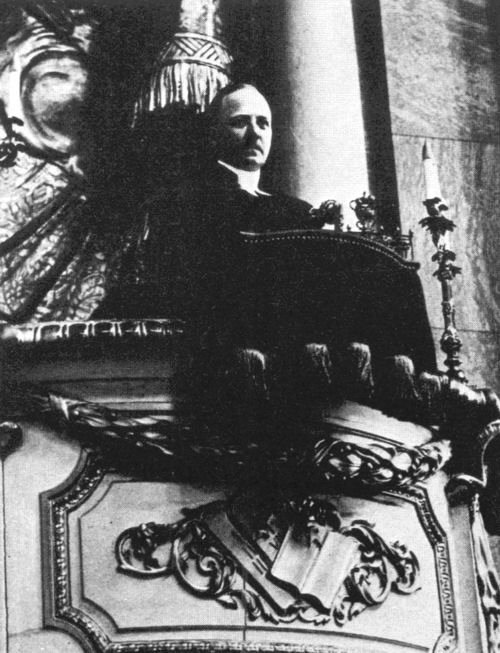
Erik Bergman (Ingmar Bergman's father) who became parish minister in 1934 delivering a sermon at Hedvig Eleonora as of 1918

The elevation of the Sacred Host during a Thanksgiving Mass at Hedvig Eleonora Church

The sign of peace during the offering of the Mass at Hedvig Eleonora Church
