= Emanuella Carlbeck =

Swedish teacher, school founder

Emanuella Ottiliana Carlbeck
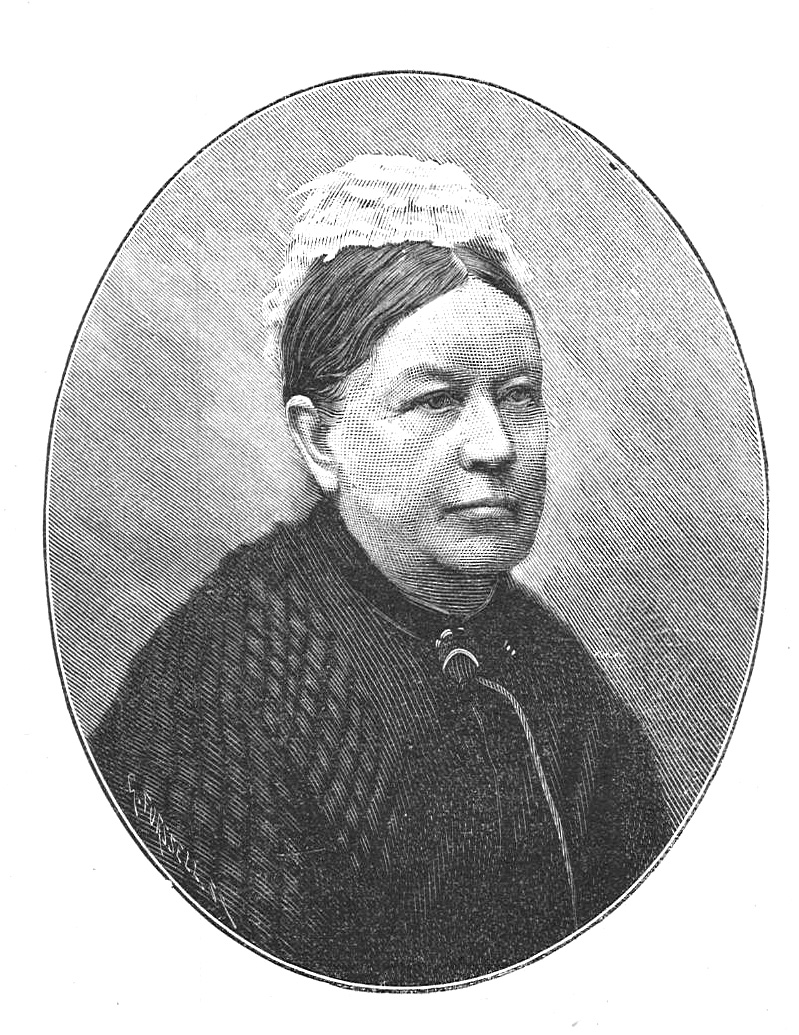
- Born: 24 August 1829; Nårunga, Sweden
- Died: 10 September 1901 (aged 72); Johannesberg, Sweden
- Occupations: Educator for special needs children School founder
- Known for: Pioneer in the care of students with Intellectual disability

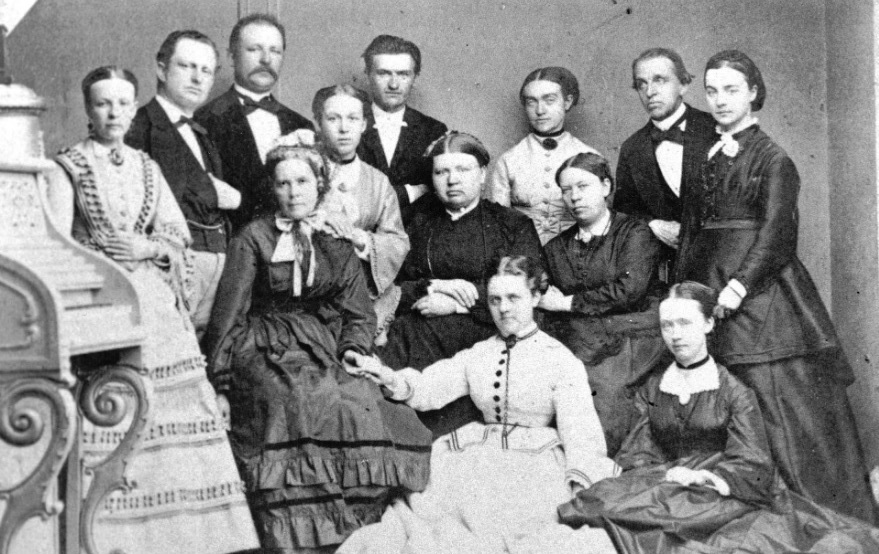
Emanuella Carlbeck, middle row, far right, at a pedagogue meeting in Copenhagen 1872.

Emanuella Ottiliana Carlbeck (24 August 1829 – 10 September 1901) was a Swedish pedagogue and is counted as a pioneer in the education of students with Intellectual disability. She founded the first institution for people with Intellectual disabilities in Gothenburg in 1866. The institution included a school, a working home and an asylum for patients.

== Life ==
Emanuella Carlbeck was the daughter of a vicar, Johan Carlbeck, and Gustava Rebecka Syk, the daughter of a restaurant owner in Karlstad. Emanuella worked as a caretaker and governess as an adult and never married. Her concern for children born with intellectual disabilities was initiated by the birth of her nephew, who had this disability, by her sister Ephraima. In mid 19th-century Sweden, there were no institutions for these children, nor any places in the public eye whatsoever: they were simply hidden away by their families and never seen, "perceived as being completely incapable of being educated." Like her contemporary Sophia Wilkens, Emanuella Carlbeck belonged to the class of upper- and middle class females engaged in social reform work.

In 1866, at age 37, she founded her first institution for children with intellectual disabilities in Gothenburg, including a school and a working home as well as an asylum. This has been referred to as the first institution of its kind in Sweden: though the one of Sophia Wilkens was in fact founded seven years prior, it was the one of Carlbeck's that became the role model for all following institutions in the nation. In the beginning it had only a handful of patients and grew rapidly, as institutions for disabled children in particular were a novelty. From 1871 on, it was given government support.

According to one source, Carlbeck learned her craft by visiting other international institutions where disabled children were being successfully educated.

Emanuella Carlbeck gained much of her knowledge of special-needs pedagogy by reading a lot of the available material on the subject. She also undertook study trips to Denmark and Germany to visit their already extant institutions for intellectually impaired people. From 1872 onwards Emanuella Carlbeck began to attend the so-called ‘abnormal school’ meetings which were periodically held within Scandinavia. ... As her surviving papers reveal, Emanuella Carlbeck felt that working on behalf of the ‘cause of idiots’ was a God-given task.

Originally a private charitable institution, her first school was taken over by the state in 1885. She continued to receive funding from the clergy in Västergötland, and they also helped her buy the Johannesberg estate near Mariestad in 1875, which she converted into a school. The Johannesberg school was visited by interested educators every year and served as a model to many others.

Emanuella Carlbeck died at Johannesberg in 1901 and has been referred to as the founder of the Swedish institutionalized care.

== See also ==
- Thorborg Rappe
