= Vivi Sylwan =

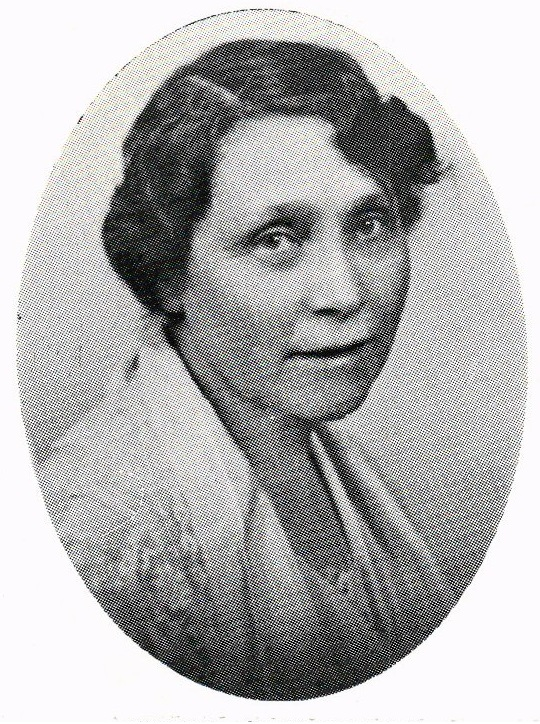
- Born: 4 September 1870; Kristianstad
- Died: October 5, 1961 (aged 91); Gothenburg
- Occupation(s): Swedish textile historian and curator
- Employer: Röhsska Museum

Vivi Sylwan (4 September 1870 - 5 October 1961) was a Swedish textile historian and textile curator at the Röhsska Museum in Gothenburg.

== Early life and education ==
Anna Sofia Vivi Sylwan was born on 4 September 1870 in Kristianstad, to Ida Carolina (née Wendel) and Lieutenant Colonel Otto Sylwan. She was one of eight children. Her half-brother Otto Sylwan became a professor of aesthetics, literature, and history of art at Gothenburg College and was Principal of the college from 1914 to 1931. The two siblings lived together until his death in 1954.

Sylwan studied in the Department of Higher Art Industry at the Technical University of Stockholm, now Konstfack. She qualified as a drawing instructor in Stockholm in 1894.

== Career ==
Sylwan lived in Berlin between 1895 and 1896 where she worked in an embroidery firm, before returning to Sweden to run a traditional handicrafts shop in Malm. She also taught drawing.

She began working at the Röhsska Museum in 1912 as a typist, before the museum opened to the public. Collecting to develop the content of the museum was underway and by 1914 she was suggesting and planning of collecting trips for the museum. That year she undertook collecting textiles on Öland and Småland and paperwork indicated that she organised textile magazines and exhibitions. She worked at the Röhsska Museum for the rest of her career.

Sylwan was head of the museum's textile department from 1914 to 1941, and played a prominent role in Swedish textile research. She made extensive efforts to collect folk textiles, which was her speciality. However, she worked in a broad field of research that was culturally and ethnographically orientated.

Sylwan carefully documented her research results in essays and books. The texts were based on her studies of textile collections both in Sweden and abroad, where she travelled to Germany, England, France and Austria. Over time, her research also became more international in scope, ranging from woollen tapestry fabrics from Central Asia to silk fabrics from China.

Vivi Sylwan died on 5 October 1961 in Gothenburg and was buried in Fosie cemetery.

== Recognition and awards ==
Sylwan was awarded the Illis quorum medal in 1934, a gold medal awarded for outstanding contributions to Swedish culture, science or society. In 1936, she was awarded the Jacques Lamm Prize for her work in the fine arts and the creative industries. In 1941, Sylwan was the first woman to be awarded an honorary doctorate by the University of Gothenburg.

== Publications ==
- Studier i senantik textil konst : några tekniska problem. (Studies in late antique textile art: some technical problems) [1920]. in: Rig 1920, pp. 129–144.
- Tekniken i Överhogdalstapeten (The technology of Överhogdal wallpaper). 1920. in Jämten 1920.
- Om brickband : ett bidrag till Överhogdals- och Skogstapeternas teknikhistoria. 1921. in Fornvännen 1921, pp. 212–235.
- Äldre norska tapisserivävnader (Old Norwegian tapestry weaving) catalogue foreword by Vivi Sylwan. Göteborg. Röhsska konstslöjdmuseet. Tillfällig utställning ; 45. Göteborg. 1922.
- En orientalisk matta. (An oriental carpet) Stockholm: KVHA.Fornvännen 1924.
- Senmedeltida textilier i S. Råda kyrka i Värmland. (Late medieval textiles in St. Råda church in Värmland) in Fornvännen 1924.
- Utställning 1923. Jubileumsutställningen. Västsvenska textilier å allmogeavdelningen: vägledning (Jubilee Exhibition. West Swedish textiles for the general public: a guide) Göteborg (1923).
- Brickbandet som kulturobjekt. (Brickbandet as a cultural object). Stockholm. 1926.
- Siden och brokader : sidenväveriets och tygmönstrens utveckling: en översikt (Silk and brocades: the development of silk weaving and fabric patterns: an overview) Vivi Sylwan, Agnes Geijer. Stockholm: Natur och kultur. 1931.
- En senantik gobelinmedaljong. (A late antique tapestry medallion) 1932. in Röhsska Konstslöjdmuseets årstryck 1932.
- Hur lejonet blev leopard: en studie i bohuslänsk textilkonst. (How the lion became a leopard: a study in Bohuslän textile art) 1933 in Bohuslänska studier tillägnade landshövdingen Oscar von Sydow 12 July 1933.
- Svenska ryor. (Swedish rugs) Röhsska konstslöjdmuseets skriftserie. Stockholm: Natur o. kultur. 1934
- Silk from the Yin dynasty. Stockholm. 1937 in Bulletin of the museum of Far Eastern antiquities, 1937:9
- En damastduk och dess förebilder. (A damask cloth and its models) Göteborg. 1938. in Röhsska Konstslöjdmuseets årstryck 1938.
- Archaeological researches in Sinkiang: especially the Lop-nor region / by Folke Bergman; descriptive lists of textiles by Vivi Sylwan ; appendices by Sten Konow and Hjalmar Ljungh. Reports from the Scientific Expedition to the North-Western Provinces of China under the Leadership of Dr. Sven Hedin - The Sino-Swedish expedition, 0348-0984 ; 7:1 Archaeology. Stockholm: Thule. 1939.
- Våra textilier och deras vård. (Our textiles and their care) Göteborg. 1941.
- Woollen textiles of the Lou-lan people. Reports from the Scientific Expedition to the North-Western Provinces of China under the Leadership of Dr. Sven Hedin - The Sino-Swedish expedition, 0348-0984 ; 7:2 Archaeology. Stockholm: [Thule]. 1941.
- Archaeology. Reports from the scientific expedition to the north-western provinces of China under the leadership of Dr. Sven Hedin ; 45. 8. Ethnography ; 9. 1949.
- Investigation of silk from Edsengol and Lop-nor : and a survey of wool and vegetable materials. Reports from the Scientific Expedition to the North-Western Provinces of China under the Leadership of Dr. Sven Hedin - The Sino-Swedish expedition, 0348-0984 ; 7:6 Archaeology. Stockholm: [Statens etnografiska museum i distr.]. 1949.
- Bonaden från Skog: Till frågan om dess innehåll och datering. (The embroidery from Skog: to the question of its contents and dating) Stockholm. 1950 in Fornvännen 1949
- Den skånska dukagångsdrätten: ett bidrag till dess historia. (Laws of the Scanian dukedom: a contribution to its history) Göteborgs kungl. vetenskaps - och vitterhets-samhälles handlingar. (Papers of the Gothenburg Royal Society of Science and Letters) Ser. A, Humanistiska skrifter, 99-0427951-9 ; Följd 6, 4 :7. Göteborg: Wettergren & Kerber. 1954.
