= Illis quorum =

Swedish award

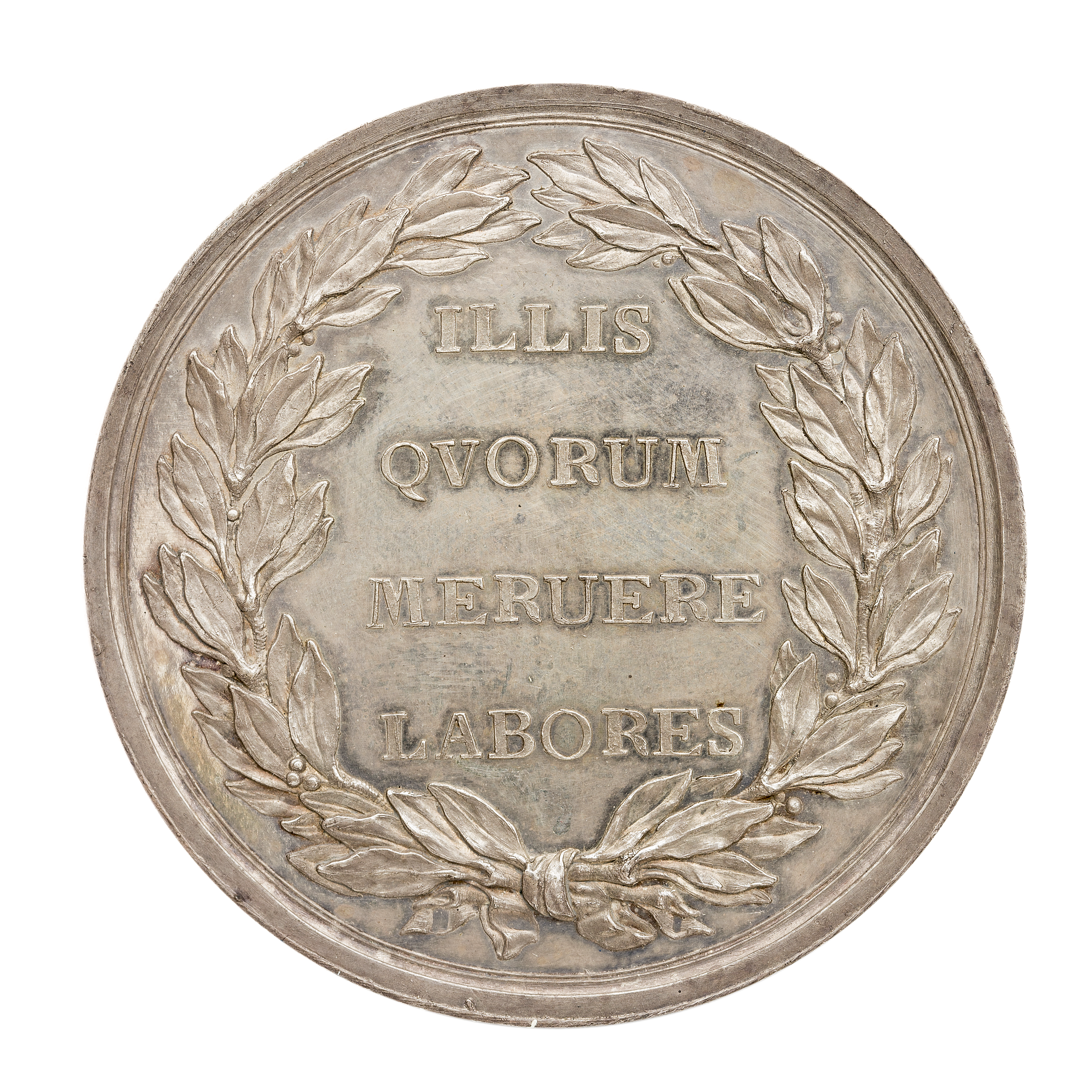
- Awarded for: Cultural, scientific and other public benefit purposes
- Date: 1785
- Country: Sweden
- Motto: "For Those Whose Labors Have Deserved It"
- Ribbon bar

Illis quorum (Illis quorum meruere labores) (English: "For Those Whose Labors Have Deserved It") is a gold medal awarded for outstanding contributions to Swedish culture, science or society.

The award was introduced in 1784 by King Gustav III, and was first awarded in 1785. Prior to 1975, the medal was awarded by the King of Sweden. Illis quorum is now awarded by the Government of Sweden, and it is currently the highest award that can be conferred upon an individual Swedish citizen by the Government. It is awarded, on average, to seven people per year.

== Selected recipients ==
- 1848 – Rafael Ginard i Sabater
- 1873 – Sophia Wilkens
- 1883 – Lea Ahlborn
- 1890 – Karin Åhlin
- 1895 – Sophie Adlersparre, Emmy Rappe
- 1896 – Hilda Caselli
- 1899 – Ellen Bergman
- 1904 – Anna Sandström
- 1907 – Gertrud Adelborg, Anna Hierta-Retzius
- 1910 – Agda Montelius
- 1913 – Anna Rönström
- 1918 – Kerstin Hesselgren, Emilie Rathou
- 1920 – Elsa Brändström
- 1921 – Frigga Carlberg
- 1923 – Matilda Widegren
- 1924 – Magna Sunnerdahl
- 1925 – Ann-Margret Holmgren
- 1927 – Selma Lagerlöf, Aurore Grandien, Jacob Hägg
- 1932 – Valfrid Palmgren
- 1934 - Vivi Sylwan
- 1936 – Hanna Rydh, Herta Svensson
- 1942 – Eva Ramstedt
- 1945 – Anna Johansson-Visborg, Olivia Nordgren
- 1946 – Naima Sahlbom
- 1951 – Elise Ottesen-Jensen
- 1952 – Raoul Wallenberg
- 1978 – Astrid Lindgren
- 1981 – Birgit Nilsson
- 1983 - Bengt Idestam-Almquist
- 1985 – Astrid Lindgren, Sune Bergström
- 1993 – Lars Lönndahl
- 1994 – Putte Wickman
- 1998 – Thage G. Peterson
- 1999 – Arne Isacsson
- 2002 – Per Anger, Dina Schneidermann
- 2003 – Birgitta Dahl
- 2005 – Lennart Johansson, Janne Schaffer
- 2006 – Peter Dahl
- 2010 – Hans Rosling
- 2012 – Gunilla Bergström
- 2014 – Martin Widmark
- 2023 – Lena Anderson
- 2023 – Christofer Murray
- 2023 – Carola Häggkvist

== See also ==
- Orders, decorations, and medals of Sweden
