= Anna Rönström =

Swedish educator

Anna Rönström (1847–1920) was a Swedish educator. She was a local pioneer of female education in Lund, and the founder of the secondary education school Högre Elementarskolan i Lund (Higher Elementary School in Lund) for girls, also customarily known as Rönströmska skolan (Rönström School).

== Life ==
Anna Rönström was a student of the Högre lärarinneseminariet in Stockholm 1864–1867, and worked as a governess in Lund before she founded her own school for girls in 1871. The school was originally referred to as Rönström School (Rönströmska skolan) after its founder, and became the first school in Lund to provide secondary education to females in preparation for university studies. In this, Rönström and her school was a typical representative of other female pioneers who opened the first secondary education schools for girls in different Swedish cities, comparable to other local pioneers such as Maria Henschen in Uppsala, Maria Stenkula in Malmö and Elsa Borg in Gävle.

In theory, Rönström was a conservative anti-feminist and in fact had a conservative view of women's education. She stated that women should be educated at home for a life in the home; that a school for women should be more of a second home rather than a school, training their students as parents raise their children rather than educating them; and that the education of females should be guided by religion: this was in fact typical of the conservative view in the contemporary debate of women's education. In practice, however, the school she created was in fact radical and adjusted to the modern views of equal education of men and women: the school provided its students all the education necessary to prepare for university studies. Also, unlike many other girls' schools of the same kind, it also provided the same mathematics level as secondary school did for boys; furthermore, it did not teach the French language, as schools for females normally did, but rather the German language, which was the language preferred in boys' secondary schools at the time. She also introduced home economics, which was a radical innovation at the time (1892). Her school was successful, granted state support in 1879 and communal support in 1882.

Rönström was also an influential participator in the flickskolmöte, the annual national girls' school conferences. She introduced a teacher exchange between Denmark and Sweden in 1898, which became popular and functioned for many years. In 1905, she also founded a women's teachers' seminary with Anna Heurlin, which was incorporated in her school. She is described as a skillful mathematician and became a member of the International Congress of Mathematicians at the meeting held in Rome in 1908.

The fate of her school was also typical: in 1933, it was united with its prime rival, the Lunds fullständiga läroverk för flickor from 1880, to form Lunds kommunala flickskola ('Lund Communal Girls' School'), which was in turn later made a co-educational school.

She was awarded the Swedish royal medal Illis Quorum Meruere Labores (commonly known as Illis quorum) in 1913.

== Other sources ==
- Schånberg, Ingela (2004) De dubbla budskapen. Kvinnors bildning och utbildning i Sverige under 1800- och 1900-talen (Studentlitteratur)
- Heckscher, Ebba (1914) Några drag ur den svenska flickskolans historia: under fleres medverkan samlade (Norstedt & söner: Stockholm)
