= Röhss family =

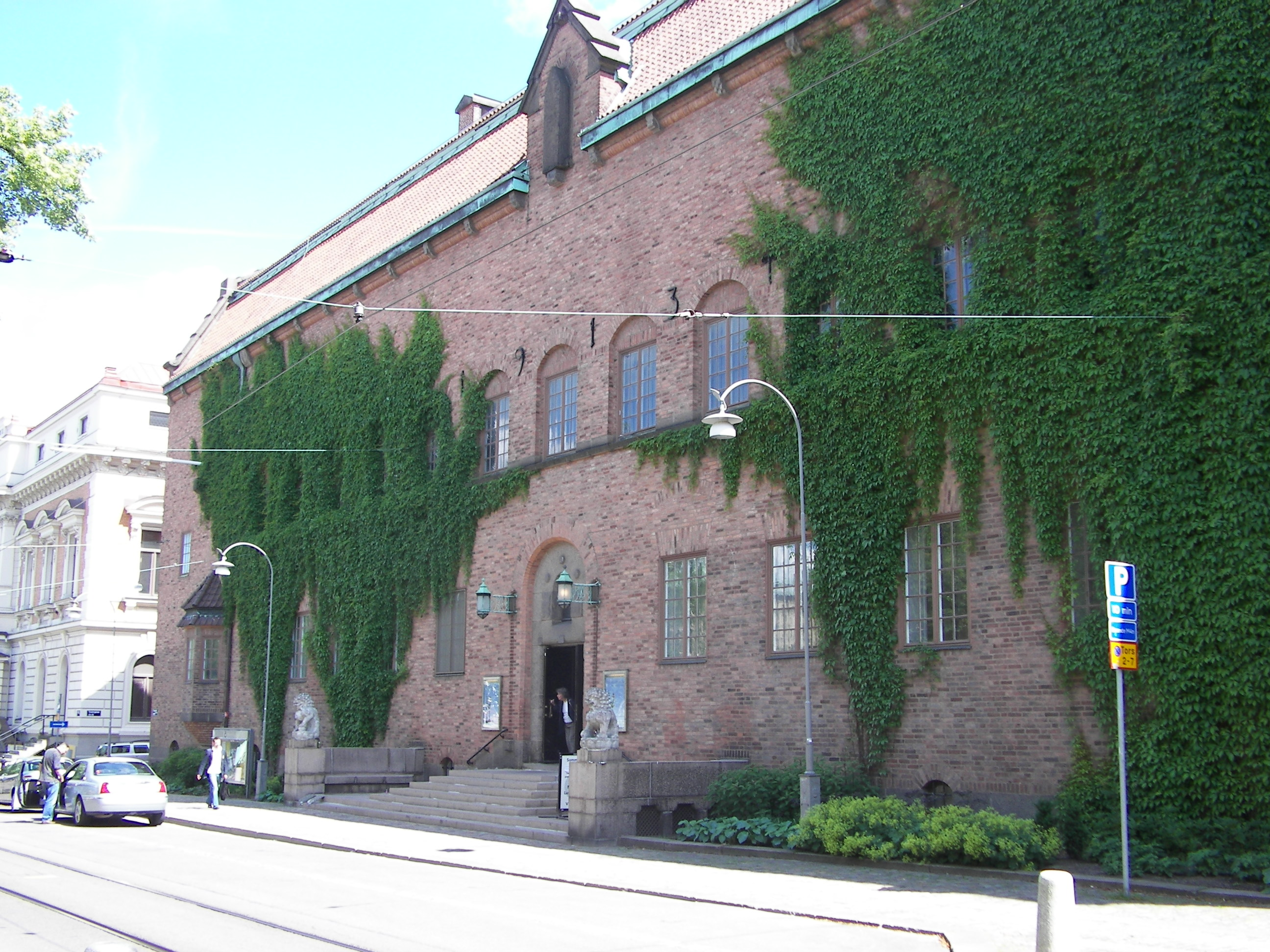
The Röhsska Museum at Vasagatan in Gothenburg

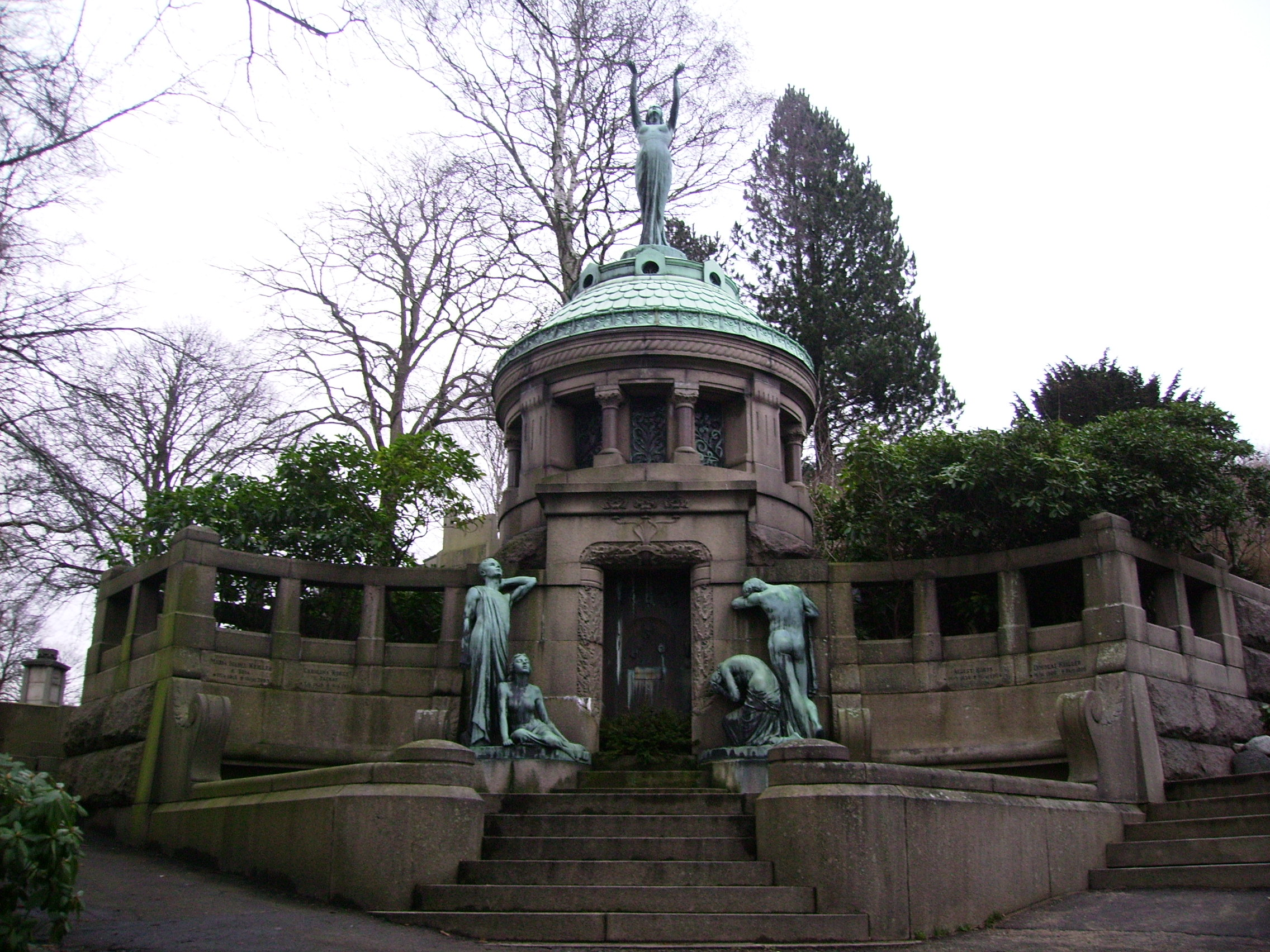
Mausoleum of August Röhss

Röhss was a family of merchants in the city of Gothenburg, Sweden, noteworthy through their significant donations to several local and national institutions.

The family originates in Schleswig, where Johan Gottlob Röhss (1766-1842) was a book dealer. He had three sons who settled in Gothenburg; the most important of these was Wilhelm August Fredrik Röhss (1796-1858), who started his career as a pharmacist but changed his occupation to trade with Scandinavia. He settled in Gothenburg in 1827, where he helped the merchant Johan Gabriel Grönwall in establishing a dyeing plant at the river Mölndalsån. Röhss married Grönwall's granddaughter in 1831. After Grönwall retired in 1839, Röhss took over his trade and shipping business, in addition to other businesses. After his death in 1858, Wilhelm Röhss's business was taken over by his widow (Carin Röhss; 1804-1886) and two sons, Carl Wilhelm Christian Röhss (Wilhelm Röhss the younger; 1834-1900) and Johan August Anders Röhss (known as August; 1836-1904).

Wilhelm Röhss the elder conducted trade and shipping on a large scale and owned a brewery and factories for cotton, sugar, paper, among other things. His two sons continued the father's industrial activities, and invested in iron works in Värmland and in sawmills in the booming timber industry in Norrland.

Wilhelm Röhss the younger (1834-1900) attended the Göteborgs handelsinstitut (Gothenburg School of Trade). He was a city councillor in Gothenburg, a member of the board of the bank Göteborgs enskilda bank, and in several railroad companies. He was consul in Gothenburg for the city of Hamburg, and later for the German empire. Of his fortune, Wilhelm Röhss left 1,5 million Swedish kronor to the city. 250,000 kronor were given to the establishment of the craft and design museum known at the time as Röhsska konstslöjdmuseet (now Röhsska museet för konsthantverk och design, and in English as the Röhsska Museum). It was built at Vasagatan in central Gothenburg and opened in 1916. Another quarter of a million was used immediately for other purposes. The remaining million was left to a trust, Röhss' donationsfond. The interest of the capital was to be used for the promotion of Gothenburg's commerce, industry or communications. The first payment, in 1911, was used for a new building for Wihelm Röhss's alma mater, the Göteborgs handelsinstitut. The institute later merged with the Hvitfeldtska gymnasiet, and the building is part of the current Hvitfeldtska campus.

Wilhelm Röhss's brother, August Röhss (1836-1904) attended the Chalmers School for Craft (now known as the Chalmers University of Technology) and Bergsskolan, the mining school in Falun. He became his brother's business partner and was its sole owner from 1900 until its liquidation in 1902. He was a patron of several artists and museums. He donated considerable sums to the Royal Swedish Academy of Arts, and a large book collection to the Gothenburg Public Library. He added 180,000 kr to the money already given by his brother for the future Röhsska Museum. He gave 350,000 kr to University of Gothenburg for the establishment of three professorial chairs, one in political economy and sociology, another one in geography and ethnography, and a third in political science and statistics. August Röhss was elected an honorary member of the Royal Swedish Academy of Arts in 1891, and was a member of the Royal Society of Sciences and Letters in Gothenburg.

== Bibliography ==
- Clemensson, Per: "Röhss", Svenskt biografiskt lexikon, 31, pp. 188-190
- Warburg, Karl Johan ("K.W-g"): "Röhss", Nordisk familjebok, 24 (1916), columns 142-143
