= Quality of Government Institute =

Swedish research institute

- Founders: Bo Rothstein, Sören Holmberg
- Established: 2004
- Focus: Good Governance and the Quality of Government
- Adjunct faculty: University of Gothenburg
- Website: gu.se/qog

The Quality of Government (QoG)-Institute is an independent research institute at the University of Gothenburg.

The institute was founded by Professors Bo Rothstein and Sören Holmberg in 2004, and is partly financed by the Bank of Sweden Tercentenary Foundation, the Swedish Research Council, and the Knut and Alice Wallenberg Foundation.

The main objective the QoG Institute´s research is to address the theoretical and empirical problem of how political institutions of high quality can be created and maintained. Another objective is to study the effects of Quality of Government on a number of policy areas, such as health, the environment, social policy, and poverty.

Since its start in 2004, the QoG Institute has continuously gathered various data related to its research field, and today, the institute offers several open-source datasets including both compilation datasets and original datasets, all related to Quality of Government.

The compilation datasets are drawn from more than one hundred different sources that deal with topics related to the concepts of Quality of Government. The flagship is the award winning QoG Standard Dataset but the compilation datasets also includes the QoG Basic Dataset, which contains the most frequently used variables of the Standard Dataset, the QoG OECD, which is a regionally specified dataset covering OECD member states, and the EU Regional Data, which consists of approximately 450 variables from Eurostat and other sources, covering three levels of European regions - country, major socio-economic regions and basic regions for the application of regional policies.

The original datasets are created by the QoG researchers and focus on concepts related to quality of government, transparency and public administration. The QoG Expert Survey is a dataset based on surveys among experts on public administration around the world, available in an individual dataset and an aggregated dataset covering more than 100 countries. The original datasets also includes the European Quality of Government Index(EQI), which contains information on sub-national governance in Europe from three rounds of a large, pan-European survey on citizen perceptions and experiences with public services. Both micro and sub-national data are provided. Finally, the Swedish Agency database which consists of a comprehensive sample of administrative agencies in the Swedish executive bureaucracy between 1960 and 2014.
