= Anna Johansson-Visborg =

Swedish trade union leader, women's rights activist and politician

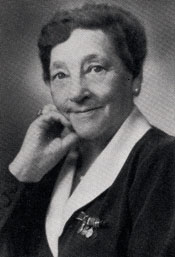
Anna Johansson-Visborg

Anna Johansson-Visborg (10 November 1876 – 7 August 1953) was a Swedish trade union leader, women's rights activist and politician with the Swedish Social Democratic Party.

== Biography ==
Anna Sofia Johansson-Visborg was born to a farming family at Beateberg parish in Töreboda Municipality in Västra Götaland County, Sweden. She was married in 1919 to Sven Gylfe Visborg (1885–1957). She worked as a domestic servant in Gothenburg from 1893–1897 and a brewery worker in Stockholm from 1897–1904, and an office clerk at an insurance company from 1904–1918.

In 1914, she began her own real estate business and became a cinema owner which resulted in considerable wealth. This led to the foundation of the Anna Johansson-Visborg Foundation (Anna Johansson-Visborgs Stiftelse) with the task of providing full-time or partially-needed housing in Stockholm.

=== Policial career ===
In 1901, she was one of the founders of the first Swedish trade union for brewery workers. Johansson-Visborg was chairperson in the Swedish Industrial Brewery Workers' Union (Svenska bryggeriarbetareförbundet) from 1904–1953; chairperson of the Cooperative Women's Association (Kooperativa Kvinnogillesförbundet) from 1907–1938; chairperson of the Stockholm central worker's unions women's branch from 1911–1953; member of the Stockholm City Council from 1916–1950; member of the board of the Social Democratic Women in Sweden from 1920–1924; member of the board of the Stockholm Municipality from 1929–1933.

She was also a leading force in the Social Democratic women suffrage movement. While the Social Democratic women did not have their own separate women's suffrage organisation, they worked actively alongside the National Association for Women's Suffrage. As a politician and activist, she always worked to abolish all legislation opposite to gender equality.

Johansson-Visborg was described as brusque, energetic and with a great administrative talent: her lack of diplomacy somewhat damaged her politician career, but she was also appreciated for it, and referred to by her followers as "Brewer-Anna" (Bryggar-Anna).

== Awards ==
She was awarded the Illis Quorum in 1945.

== Other sources ==
- Ragnar Amenius. Anna S Johansson-Visborg (urn:sbl:12170, Svenskt biografiskt lexikon, hämtad 2015-05-30)

== Related reading ==
- Marika Lindgren Åsbrink, Anne-Marie Lindgren (2007) Systrar, kamrater! : arbetarrörelsens kvinnliga pionjärer (StockholmIdé & Tendens) ISBN 9789197675628
