= Rafael Ginard i Sabater =

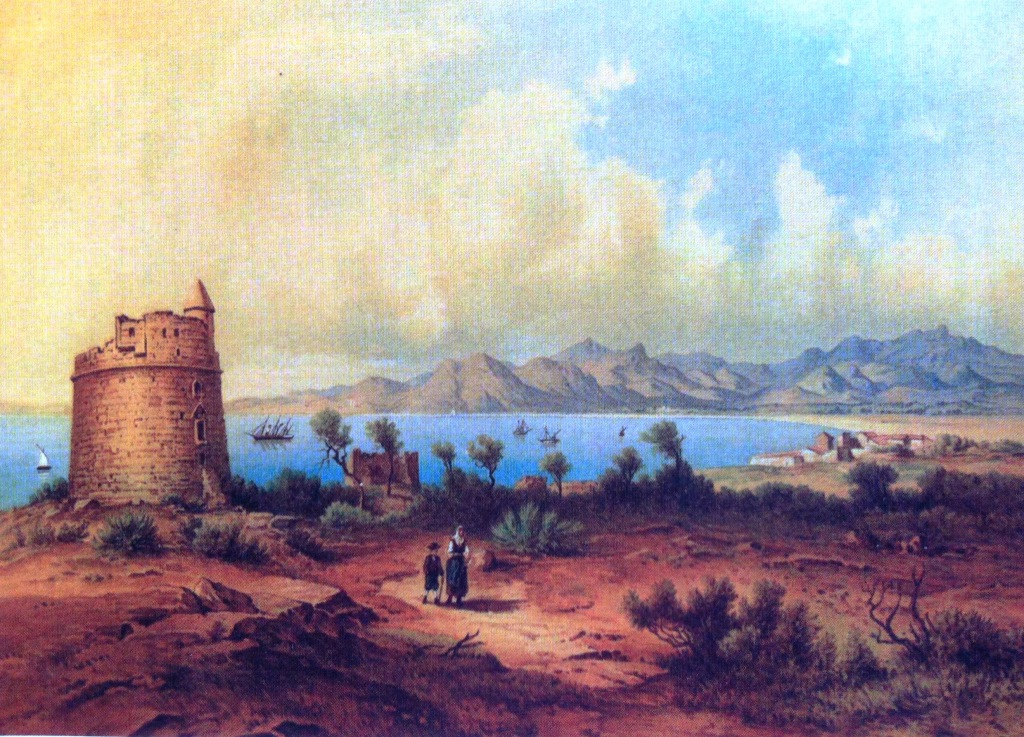
Alcúdia's Bay view (19th century)

Rafael Ginard i Sabater, alias Romà, was a skipper in Port d'Alcúdia, Mallorca, Spain, in the 19th century. In 1847 he took part in the rescue of the Flora, a schooner that was shipwrecked near Barcelona and then dragged by the current to the bay of Alcúdia. Rafael Ginard's determination saved the sailors and the captain aboard the Flora. In grateful recognition of his service, King Oscar I of Sweden awarded Rafael Ginard with the Illis Quorum medal.
