= Fredrika Bremer =

Swedish writer and reformer (1801–1865)

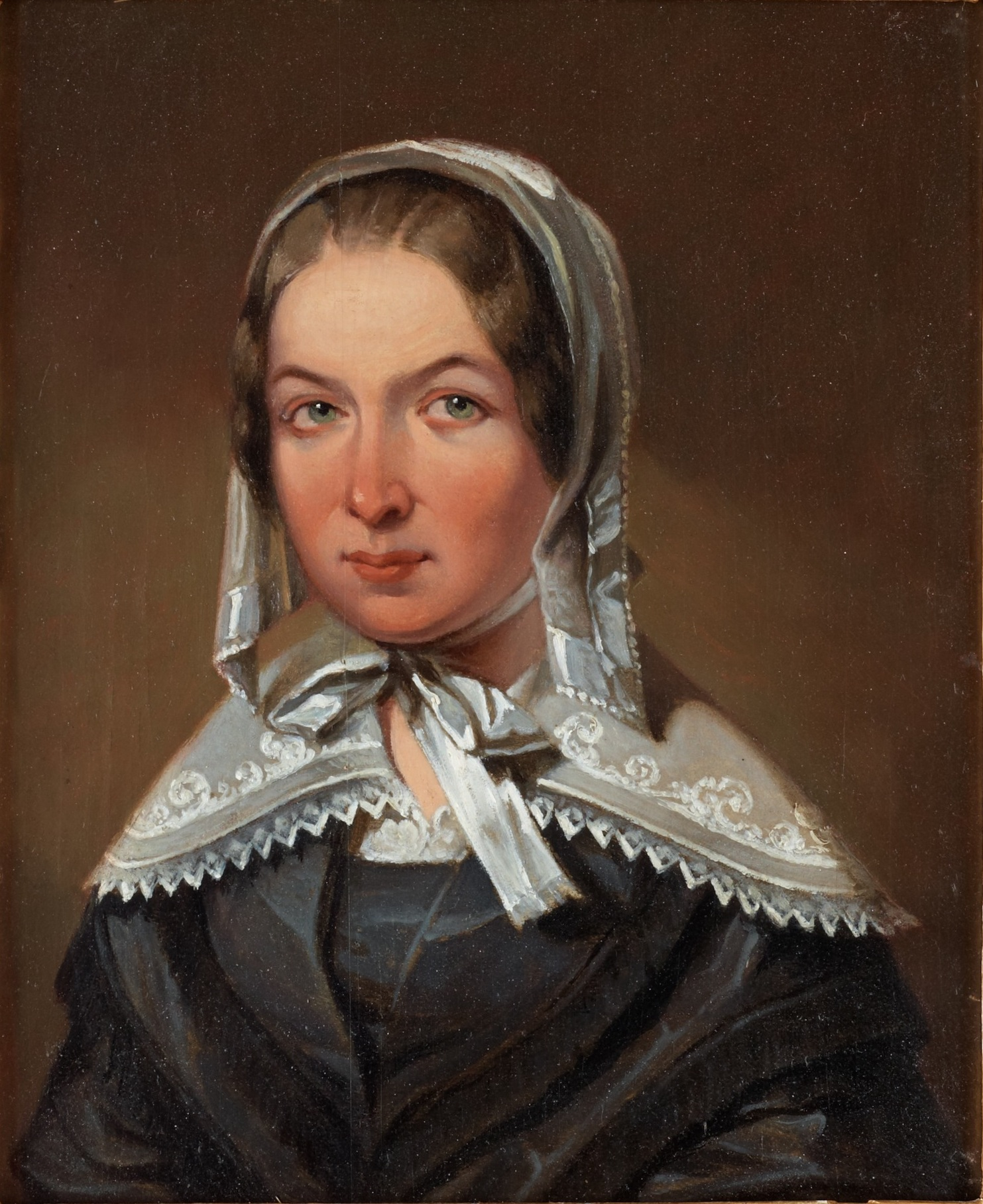
- Copy of a portrait by Johan Gustaf Sandberg
- Born: 17 August 1801; Turku, Sweden
- Died: 31 December 1865 (aged 64); Årsta Castle, Sweden
- Occupation: Writer
- Notable work: Hertha

Fredrika Bremer (17 August 1801 – 31 December 1865) was a Finnish-born Swedish writer and reformer. Her Sketches of Everyday Life were wildly popular in Britain and the United States during the 1840s and 1850s and she is regarded as the Swedish Jane Austen, bringing the realist novel to prominence in Swedish literature.

In her late 30s, Bremer successfully petitioned King Charles XIV for emancipation from her brother's wardship; in her 50s, her novel Hertha prompted a social movement that granted all unmarried Swedish women legal majority at the age of 25 and established Högre Lärarinneseminariet, Sweden's first female tertiary school. It also inspired Sophie Adlersparre to begin publishing the Home Review, Sweden's first women's magazine as well as the later magazine Hertha. In 1884, she became the namesake of the Fredrika Bremer Association, the first women's rights organization in Sweden.

== Early life ==
Fredrika Bremer was born into a Swedish-speaking Finnish family on 17 August 1801 at Tuorla Manor in Piikkiö Parish outside of Turku in present-day Finland, which at the time was part of the Kingdom of Sweden. She was the second daughter of five and the second child of seven of Carl Fredrik Bremer (1770–1830) and Birgitta Charlotta Hollström (1777–1855). (Note: Only one brother, however, survived to adulthood.) Her grandparents Jacob and Ulrika Fredrika Bremer had built up one of the largest business empires in Finland but, upon his mother's death in 1798, Carl liquidated their holdings. A few years later, the Finnish war of the Napoleonic Wars would see Finland annexed to Russia and made into the Grand Duchy of Finland. When Fredrika was three years old, the family moved to Stockholm. The next year, they purchased Årsta Castle, about 20 miles (32 km) distant from the capital. Fredrika passed the next two decades of her life summering there and at another nearby estate owned by her father, spending winter in the family's Stockholm apartment.

Fredrika and her sisters were raised to marry and became socialites and hostesses within the upper class like their own French-trained mother. They were given the education then conventional for girls of their class in Sweden, with private tutors followed by a family trip through Germany, Switzerland, France, and the Netherlands in 1821 and 1822 before their social debuts. She was a talented miniaturist and studied French, English, and German. She later recounted that she kept a diary for a few years as a girl—"a kind of moral account-current, in which each day was entered, with a short observation of good, or bad, or middling"—but, as the yearly totals always showed the middling days' totals to be greatest, she tired of it and thereafter only kept them while traveling as notes for others. Bremer found the limited and passive family life of Swedish women of her time suffocating and frustrating and her own education was unusually strict, with rigid timetables governing her days. She described her family as "under the oppression of a male iron hand": (Note: Swedish: "under förtrycket av en manlig järnhand".) While in Stockholm, the girls were forbidden from playing outside and took their exercise by jumping up and down while holding onto the backs of chairs. She wrote French poetry as early as the age of eight, but considered her time in Paris disappointing because of her father's bad temper. She was considered awkward and rebellious throughout her childhood; and one of her sisters later wrote of how she enjoyed cutting off parts of her dresses and curtains and throwing things into the fire to watch them burn.

== Early adulthood ==
Upon her return to Sweden, she debuted into upper-class society in Stockholm and Årsta but found the enforced passivity of women's life intolerable: "How quietly, like muddy water, time stands for a youth, who, during a boring and idle life, drags out her days." (Note: "Huru stilla, likt ett grumligt vatten, står tiden för en ungdom, som under ett tråkigt och overksamt liv framsläpar sina dagar.") She was deeply touched by Schiller's poems and began to long for some career through which she could do good in the world beyond ladies' traditional employments. As she later wrote, "Embroidering an eternal and gray collar, I grew more and more numb... that is, in my living powers, my wish to live. The feeling of torment did not grow numb. It worsened day by day, like frost during a growing winter. The fire of my soul flickered anxiously with but one wish—to forever die out". (Note: "Broderande på en evig och grå halsremsa, domnade jag allt mer och mer, det vill säga i mina livligare krafter, i min håg att leva. Känslan av plåga domnade ej, den blev med varje dag skarpare, liksom frosten under en tilltagande vinter. Lågan i min själ flämtade ångestfullt och ville blott ett—för alltid slockna.") The "non-life" she saw awaiting her prompted an outbreak of depression. Her resolve to find work at one of Stockholm's hospitals was undermined by a sister, but she found great satisfaction in charity work around the family's estate in Årsta during the winters of 1826–7 and 1827–8.

Her social work was the beginning of her literary career, as she began writing and seeking publishers in 1828 with the initial purpose of using her education in art and literature to earn funds for her charity work. (She had written an outraged retort against the male "tyranny" espoused in Johan Olof Wallin's Lutheran sermon "On the Quiet Calling of Women" the year before but it was only published posthumously.) Her 4-volume Sketches of Everyday Life was published as an anonymous serial from 1828 to 1831 and became an immediate success, particularly the comic Family H— (Note: Also translated under the title The Colonel's Family.) which appeared in the second and third volumes. She described the process as a revelation, as, once she had begun to write, she felt the words coming "as champagne bubbles out of a bottle". (Note: "...som champagnebläddror ur en butelj.") The Swedish Academy awarded her their lesser gold medal on 1 January 1831; she continued to write for the remainder of her life.

Her success and desire to keep writing drove her to study literature and philosophy in greater depth. An English friend Frances Lewin introduced her to Bentham's Utilitarianism, which liberalized her political views. Bentham's idea of providing "the greatest happiness to the greatest number" also encouraged her to continue devoting her time to her writing instead of nursing. In the autumn 1831, she began taking private lessons from Per Johan Böklin (1796-1867), a reform educator and the principal of a school in Kristianstad. He challenged her support of Enlightenment and Classicist figures such as Herder and Schiller with a conception of Romanticism grounded in Plato. The lessons continued until the summer of 1833, by which time they were very close.

I would like to become an author to whose works everyone who is sad, depressed, and troubled (and especially everyone of my own sex who is suffering) could go, assured of finding in them a word of redress, of comfort, or encouragement.

— Letter to Per Böklin

She wrote during the time "I want to kiss a man, breastfeed a baby, manage a household, to be happy, and think of nothing except for them and the praise of God." (Note: "Jag vill kyssa en man, amma ett barn, sköta ett hushåll, göra lyckliga och ej tänka utom för dem och för att prisa Gud.") She hesitated, however, in accepting Böklin's proposal of marriage and, after he hastily married another woman in 1835, she retired from Stockholm's society life and never married. The two remained close correspondents for the rest of their lives. The President's Daughters (1834) is considered to represent Bremer's increased maturity, using a well-observed portrayal of childhood for its humor while soberly illustrating a reserved young woman's blossoming into a more open and friendly way of life. Nina, its 1835 sequel, attempted to wed her realistic style with more of the speculative philosophy she discussed with Böklin, an artistic failure that was harshly reviewed, not least by Böklin and Bremer themselves.

== Writing career ==
For the next five years, Bremer settled as the guest of her friend Countess Stina Sommerheilm at Tomb Manor in Norway. She initially planned to work as a nurse at one of the local hospitals but again demurred, instead devoting her time to literature. During this period, the countess's stories of an elderly relative inspired Bremer's 1837 masterpiece The Neighbors. Her close study of the works of Goethe and Geijer—whom she met during a visit to Stockholm in 1837–8—informed several aspects of her next novel, The Home (1839). Her male contemporaries' Gothicism prompted her 1840 play The Thrall, dealing with women's lot during the Viking Age. After the countess's death, Bremer returned to Stockholm in 1840.

Since her father's death in 1830, Fredrika had grown closer to her mother. However, under the terms of Sweden's 1734 Civil Code, all unmarried women were minors under the guardianship of their closest male relative until they married, at which time they were placed under the guardianship of their husbands. Only widowed and divorced women were automatically of legal majority. Under this law, she and her unmarried sister Agathe were, since the death of their father, both wards of their elder brother who legally had complete control over their finances, an arrangement which displeased them, as their brother had irresponsibly squandered the family fortune over the last decade. The only remedy for the situation was a direct appeal to the King; such petitions, which were common for businesswomen, were customarily given a favorable reply, and their petition was approved and they were formally granted legal majority in 1840. She spent the winter of 1841–42 alone in Årsta Castle, spending her time completing the tract Morning Watches (1842), in which she stated her personal religious belief as a matter of sense first and of mystic revelation second. This aroused some opposition but she was supported by Geijer, Tegnér, and Böklin. More importantly, the work was the first which she signed by her own full name, instantly making her a literary celebrity. In 1844, the Swedish Academy awarded her their greater gold medal.

In 1842, Bremer ended the self-imposed isolation in which she had lived since Böklin's marriage and returned to Swedish social circles, which she portrayed in her Diary the next year. The work also served as her contribution to the discussion engendered by Almqvist's controversial Sara Videbeck. Despite being "dreadfully plain", her many friends knew her as humble but loyal, energetic, and strong-willed. She proclaimed that cared little for material possessions: when asked by Carl Gustaf von Brinkman why she could never be an art collector, she replied that "It is certain that nothing worth money would ever be happy with me—even a Swedish Academy medal. Offer me 50 dalers for anything except a warm overcoat and I will let it go." (Note: "Visst är, det aldrig något, som har penningvärde, kommer att trivas länge hos mig—icke ens en medalj av Svenska akademien. Bjud mig 50 rdr för vad som helst, utom för ett varmt överplagg, och jag släpper det strax.") Regarding her unselfishness, Geijer once remarked that, "my dear Fredrika, if you truly could push us all into heaven, you wouldn't mind staying outside yourself." (Note: "Ja, min söta Fredrika, om du blott kunde skjuta oss alla in i himmelriket, skulle du gärna själv stanna utanför.")

She began traveling first around Sweden and then abroad. Brockhaus inaugurated its 1841 series Select Library of Foreign Classics (German: Ausgewählte Bibliotek der Classiker des Auslandes) with a translation of Neighbors and its success led them to publish seven other volumes of Bremer's works by the end of the next year. (Note: As the German public grew more curious about the author, one edition of Nina included an unofficial "portrait" of Bremer so inaccurate she considered it to be a hoax (galenskap).) By then, Mary Howitt had begun publishing English translations in London and New York; these proved even more popular in England and United States than the original works had been in Sweden, ensuring her warm welcomes while overseas. (Note: In addition to Mary Howitt's sanctioned work, numerous bootleg English translations were also made in London, New York, and Boston. These were almost invariably from Brockhaus's German editions—which Bremer mostly disliked—and usually with still further abridgments, prompting still more complaints from the author.) After each journey, Bremer published successful volumes of descriptions or diary entries of the locations she visited. Her 1846 visit to the Rhineland prompted her 1848 volumes A Few Leaves from the Banks of the Rhine, Midsummer Journey, and Sibling Life, the last recounting her impressions of the tensions leading up to the overthrow of King Louis Philippe in France.

== Travel ==
Inspired by the work of De Tocqueville and Martineau, Bremer visited and traveled extensively through the United States. Leaving Copenhagen on 11 September 1849, she arrived in New York on 4 October. With the intent of studying the effect of democratic institutions upon society, particularly for women, she visited Boston and New England, where she met Emerson, Longfellow, Lowell, Hawthorne, and Irving; the Shaker and Quaker communities of the Mid-Atlantic States; the South, where she examined the conditions of its black slaves; and the Midwest, where she toured its Scandinavian communities and Indians. Like De Tocqueville before her, she visited America's prisons and spoke with prisoners. She then visited Spanish Cuba before returning to New York, leaving for Europe on 13 September 1851. Throughout her journey, she wrote extensive letters to her sister Agathe which were later edited into her 2-volume 1853 Homes in the New World. Having previously portrayed the Swedish home as a world unto itself, she now portrayed the American world as a great home through the many families who hosted her as she roamed. She spent six weeks in Britain, visiting Liverpool, Manchester, Birmingham, and London and meeting Elizabeth Gaskell, Charles Kingsley, and George Eliot. Her series of articles about England for the Aftonbladet largely concerned her favorable impression of the Great Exhibition, which she visited four times. They were later gathered for English publication as England in 1851.

== Activism ==
Following her return to Sweden in November, Bremer attempted to engage its middle- and upper-class ladies in social work similar to what she had found in America and England. She co-founded the Stockholm Women's Society for Children's Care (Skyddsmödraförening or Stockholms Fruntimmersförening för Barnavård) to assist the orphans left by the 1853 Stockholm cholera outbreak and the Women's Society for the Improvement of Prisoners (Fruntimmersällskapet för Fångars Förbättring) to provide moral guidance and rehabilitation of female inmates in 1854. On 28 August 1854, amid the Crimean War, the London Times published her "Invitation to a Peace Alliance" alongside an editorial rebuke of its contents: a pacifist appeal to Christian women.

In 1856, she published her novel Hertha as A Sketch from Real Life and concluded its fictionalized assault on the 2nd-class status of adult unmarried women under the 1734 Civil Code with an appendix recounting recent Swedish court cases on the topic. The work prompted the Hertha Discussion (Herthadiskussionen) throughout Swedish society, reaching Parliament in 1858. There, the old system was reformed to allow (unmarried) women to petition their nearest courthouse (rather than the royal court) at the age of 25. Five years later, the legislation was revisited and all (unmarried) women were considered to automatically reach legal majority at 25. This did not affect the status of married women, who were still under the guardianship of their husbands, or divorced women or widows, who were already of legal majority. The novel also successfully raised the question of a "women's university". Högre Lärarinneseminariet, a state school for the education of female teachers, was opened in 1861.

Bremer was not present during the Hertha Discussion, since from 1856 to 1861 she participated in another great journey through Europe and the Levant. Leaving on 27 May 1856, she first visited Switzerland, Brussels, and Paris over the course of a year. She was particularly interested in Switzerland's still-nascent "free church". From September 1857, she traveled through the still-disunified Italian peninsula, contrasting the Catholic practices of the Papal States with the Lutheran Swedish Church. Finally, she left Messina for Malta and thence traveled to Palestine, arriving on 30 January 1859 and, though nearly 60 years old, tracing the life of Jesus Christ by ship, train, wagon, and horseback. She stayed in Constantinople before touring Greece from August 1859 to May 1861. She reached Stockholm on 4 July 1861. Her accounts of the trip were published as Life in the Old World in six volumes from 1860 to 1862.

Upon her return to Sweden, she expressed her satisfaction with the reforms Hertha had prompted and took an interest in Högre Lärarinneseminariet and its students. She resumed her charitable projects and assisted with the Home Journal, the first women's magazine in Scandinavia, which Sophie Adlersparre had founded during her absence. After a final trip to Germany from July to October in 1862, she remained in Sweden the rest of her life. She was reportedly pleased with the abolition of the Diet in Sweden and of slavery in the United States. She died at Årsta Castle outside of Stockholm on 31 December 1865.

== Legacy ==
Fredrika Bremer is the namesake of Frederika, a town in the American state of Iowa, and its surrounding Bremer County. She is also the namesake of Fredrika Bremer Intermediate School in Minneapolis, Minnesota.

The American Swedish Historical Museum in Philadelphia, Pennsylvania, includes a Fredrika Bremer Room dedicated to her accomplishments.

=== Literary ===
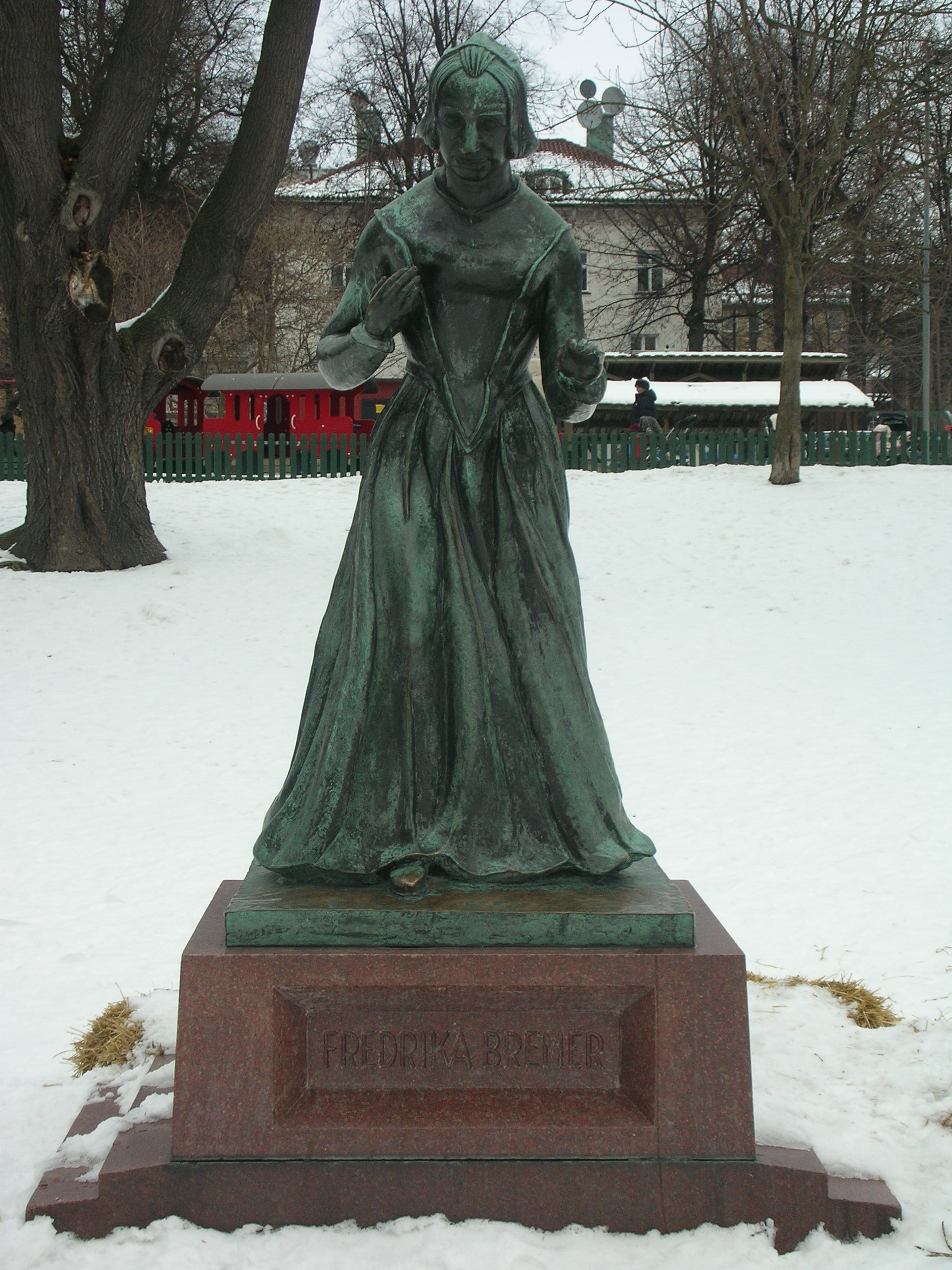
Statue depicting Fredrika Bremer in Stockholm, unveiled 2 June 1927

Historical marker near Stillwater, Minnesota notes Bremer describing the St. Croix river valley in the state of Minnesota as "just the country for a new Scandinavia"

Fredrika Bremer's novels were usually romantic stories of the time, typically concerning an independent woman narrating her observations of others negotiating the marriage market. She argued for a new family life less focused on its male members and providing a larger place for women's talents and personalities. Reflecting her own childhood, many of her works include a sharp urban/rural dichotomy; without exception, these present nature as a place of renewal, revelation, and self-discovery.

By the time Bremer revealed her name to the public, her works were an acknowledged part of the cultural life in Sweden. Translations made her still more popular abroad, where she was regarded as the "Swedish Miss Austen". Upon her arrival in New York, the New York Herald claimed she "probably... has more readers than any other female writer on the globe" and proclaimed her the author "of a new style of literature". A literary celebrity, Bremer was never without a place to stay during her two years in America despite having known no one before her arrival. She was praised by Ralph Waldo Emerson and Walt Whitman and Louisa May Alcott's Little Women includes a scene of Mrs March reading from Bremer's works to her four daughters.

Her popularity abroad crested, however, in the 1840s and 1850s and faded by the turn of the century, although the late nineteenth century English novelist George Gissing read Hertha in 1889. Within Sweden, she continued to be highly respected, though little read. The publication of her letters in the 1910s revived scholarly interest, but only in her personal life and travels. By 1948, the Swedish critic Algot Werin was writing that Bremer "really only lives as a name and a symbol... It does not matter if her novels are forgotten." Bremer's novels were rediscovered by Swedish feminists in the latter half of the 20th century and are undergoing critical reëvaluation.

=== Social causes ===
Fredrika Bremer was interested in contemporary political life and social reform regarding gender equality and social work, and she was active both as an influential participator in the debate of women's rights as well as a philanthropist. Politically, she was a liberal, who felt sympathy for social issues and for the working class movement. In 1853, she co-founded the Stockholms fruntimmersförening för barnavård (Stockholm women's fund for child care) with Fredrika Limnell.

In 1854, she co-founded the Women's Society for the Improvement of Prisoners (Fruntimmersällskapet för fångars förbättring) together with Mathilda Foy, Maria Cederschiöld, Betty Ehrenborg and Emilia Elmblad. The purpose was to visit female prisoners to provide moral support and improve their character by studies of religion. Her novel Hertha (1856) remains her most influential work. It is a dark novel about the lack of freedom for women, and it raised a debate in the parliament called "The Hertha debate", which contributed to the new law of legal majority for adult unmarried women in Sweden in 1858, and was somewhat of a starting point for the real feminist movement in Sweden. Hertha also raised the debate of higher formal education for women, and in 1861, the University for Women Teachers, Högre lärarinneseminariet, was founded by the state after the suggested women's university in Hertha. In 1859, Sophie Adlersparre, founded the paper Tidskrift för hemmet inspired by the novel. This was the starting point for Adlersparre's work as the organizer of the Swedish feminist movement. The women's magazine Hertha, named after the novel, was founded in 1914.

In 1860, she helped Johanna Berglind to fund Tysta Skolan, a school for the deaf and mute in Stockholm. At the electoral reforms regarding the right to vote of 1862, she supported the idea to give women the right to vote, which was talked about as the "horrific sight" of seeing "crinolines at the election boxes", but Bremer gave the idea her support, and the same year, women of legal majority were granted suffrage in municipal elections in Sweden. The first real Women's rights movement in Sweden, the Fredrika Bremer Association (Fredrika Bremer Förbundet), founded by Sophie Adlersparre in 1884, was named after her. Bremer was happy to mention and to recommend the work of other female professionals. She mentioned both the doctor Lovisa Årberg and the engraver Sofia Ahlbom in her work.

== Works ==
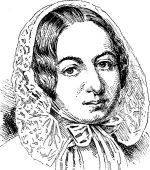

- Sketches of Everyday Life (Swedish: Teckningar utur vardagslivet; 3 vols. 1828–31)
- New Sketches of Everyday Life (Nya teckningar utur vardagslivet; 10 vols. 1834–58)
- Thrall (Trälinnan; 1840)
- Morning Watches (Morgon-väckter; 1842) Translated from the Swedish. Boston: Redding and Company. 1843. Fragile blue wrappers.
- Life in Sweden. The President's Daughters Translated by Mary Howitt. New York: Harper & Brothers, 1843. Fragile tan wrappers. No. 22 – Library of Select Novels
- The Home or Family Cares and Family Joys Translated by Mary Howitt. New York: Harper & Brothers, 1844. Fragile tan wrappers. No. 38 – Library of Select Novels
- The H___ Family: Tralinnan; Axel and Anna;; and Other Tales Translated by Mary Howitt. New York: Harper & Brothers, 1844. Fragile tan wrappers. No. 20 – Library of Select Novels
- Life in Dalecarlia: The Parsonage of Mora Translated by Mary Howitt. New York: Harper & Brothers, 1845. Fragile tan wrappers. No. 58 – Library of Select Novels
- A Few Leaves from the Banks of the Rhine (Ett par blad ifrån Rhenstranden, eller Marienberg och Kaiserswerth 1846; 1848)
- Brothers and Sisters: A Tale of Domestic Life Translated from the original unpublished manuscript by Mary Howitt. New York: Harper & Brothers, 1848. Fragile tan wrappers. No. 115 – Library of Select Novels
- The Neighbors Translated by Mary Howitt. New York: Harper & Brothers, 1848. Fragile tan wrappers. No. 20 – Library of Select Novels
- Midsummer Journey: A Pilgrimage (Midsommarresan: en vallfart; 1848)
- Life in the North (Lif i Norden; 1849)
- An Easter Offering Translated from the original unpublished manuscript by Mary Howitt. New York: Harper & Brothers, 1850 Fragile tan wrappers.
- Homes in the New World (Hemmen i den nya världen : en dagbok i brev, skrivna under tvenne års resor i Norra Amerika och på Cuba; 2 vols. 1853–1854)
- The Midnight Sun: A Pilgrimage Translated from the original unpublished manuscript by Mary Howitt. New York: Harper & Brothers, 1855. Fragile tan wrappers. No. 124 – Library of Select Novels
- "On the Novel as the Epic of Our Time" ("Om romanen såsom vår tids epos")
- Life in the Old World (Livet i Gamla Världen : dagboks-anteckningar under resor i Söder- och Österland; 6 vols. 1860–1862)
- A Little Pilgrimage in the Holy Land (Liten pilgrims resa i det heliga landet : förra afdelningen : öfversigt af land och folk, Karmel, Nazareth, Cana, Genesareth, Tabor; 1865)
- England in the Fall of 1851 (England om hösten år 1851; 1922)

== See also ==
- American Swedish Historical Museum
