= Dedekam =

Dedekam is a Norwegian surname. Notable people with the surname include:

- Morten Smith Dedekam (1793–1861), Norwegian merchant and politician
- Sophie Dedekam (1820–1894), Norwegian composer and diarist
