= Richard Ehrenborg (politician) =

Swedish politician (1821–1887)

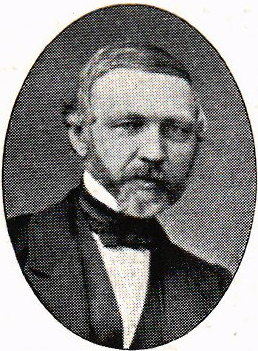
Richard Ehrenborg SPA (cropped)

Richard Mikael Ehrenborg (1821–1887) was a Swedish politician.

Born in Skaraborg County to Casper Ehrenborg and Anna Fredrica Carlqvist, Richard Ehrenborg was raised alongside two sisters, Betty Ehrenborg and Ulla Bring. He earned a master of philosophy degree from Uppsala University and returned to Västergötland. Ehrenborg married Catharina Sparre in 1854 and was later elected to the lower house of the Riksdag from Lindesberg.
