= Casper Ehrenborg =

Swedish politician

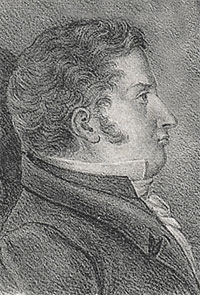
Casper Ehrenborg

Casper Isaac Michael Ehrenborg (17 November 1788 – 16 September 1823) was a Swedish politician.

He was born in Allerum on 17 November 1788 to parents Jöns Ehrenborg and Beata Maria Tham. His maternal grandfather was military officer Isak Tham. Ehrenborg married Anna Fredrica Carlqvist in 1811, with whom he raised three children, Betty Ehrenborg, Richard Ehrenborg and Ulla Bring, wife of Ebbe Gustaf Bring.

Ehrenborg began his legal career in the 1800s, working for the Göta Court of Appeal. He progressed through the judicial hierarchy, having been assigned to the administrative courts of appeal and to the Skaraborg County government by 1810. In 1821, Ehrenborg was named deputy governor of Skaraborg, serving until 1823, when he was appointed Parliamentary Ombudsman of the Riksdag of the Estates. Ehrenborg died later that year on 16 September 1823, in Stockholm Municipality.

== Sources ==
- Låstbom, August Theodor (1842). Swea och Götha höfdinga-minne sedan 1720. D. 1 (in Swedish). Upsala: Wahlström & Låstbom.
- Hildebrand, Bengt (1949). "Casper Isaac Michael Ehrenborg". Svenskt Biografiskt Lexikon.
