= Mathilda Foy =

Swedish philanthropist and writer (1813–1869)

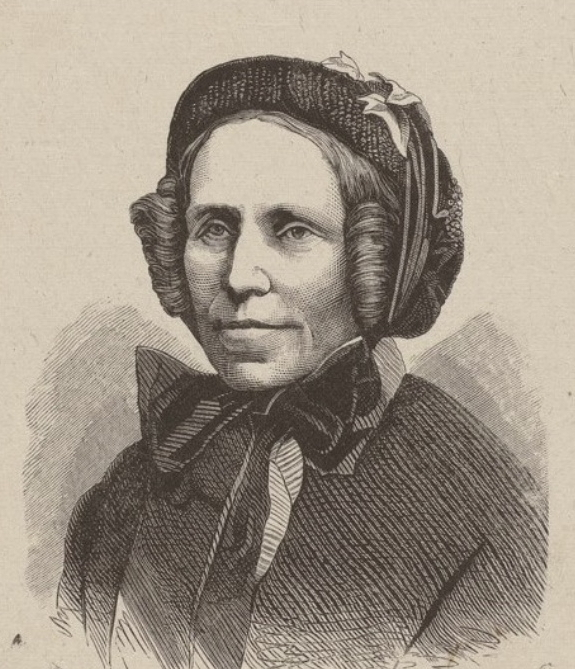
- Born: 10 November 1813; Maria Magdalena parish, Stockholm, Sweden
- Died: 1 November 1869 (aged 55); Jönköpings Kristina parish, Jönköping County, Sweden
- Occupation(s): Writer, philanthropist, Sunday school founder

Mathilda (or Mathilde) Foy (or Foj), also known as Tante Esther, (10 November 1813 – 1 November 1869), was a Swedish philanthropist and writer, known for her charitable work. She is known as a pioneer of the Sunday school, and as the co-founder of the charity organisation Fruntimmersällskapet för fångars förbättring ('Women's Society for the Improvement of Prisoners') in 1854.

== Biography ==
=== Childhood ===
Foy was born in Stockholm in 1813. She was the daughter of the British consul in Stockholm, George Foy, and his Swedish wife Mathilda Augusta Skoge.

As a girl, Foy spent the summer of 1835 at the Medevi mineral spa with her parents. Her diary gives a detailed insight into life at the spa, both the daily practicalities and her thoughts and feelings. Cultural historian Gustaf Näsström, in his book Det gamla Medevi, retells a love story from the diary that brings to mind Jane Austen writing a novel about events in Bath.

=== Religious influences and Sunday school ===
In Stockholm as a young woman, Foy was likely influenced by Methodist minister Joseph Rayner Stephens and by his successor George Scott. Scott's preaching in Swedish was controversial as at the time, any preaching outside the Church of Sweden was forbidden due to the Conventicle Act. The person with the greatest religious impact on her, however, was Lutheran Pietist revivalist preacher Carl Olof Rosenius. She was introduced to him in the early 1840s through missionary Theodore Hamberg, who worked for her father and had a close relationship with the Foy family as his own father had died when he was young. Hamberg had heard Rosenius' preaching and, impressed, convinced Foy to come to a meeting. Foy described it as a turning point. She became part of the läsare (lit. 'reader') movement, like Rosenius. Prior to Sunday schools becoming more mainstream in Sweden in the 1850s and beyond, Foy began a Sunday school in 1843–1844. However, the clergy rejected it since it seemed "Methodist" and they believed it was inappropriate for a woman to take over their function. As a result, it was ultimately scrapped.

=== Diaconal work ===
In 1851, Foy was, alongside deaconess Maria Cederschiöld as the director, on the board of directors at the newly founded Deaconess Institution, the first one in Sweden, founded that same year in Stockholm.

In 1854, she co-founded the Fruntimmersällskapet för fångars förbättring ('Women's Society for the Improvement of Prisoners') together with Cederschiöld, Fredrika Bremer, Betty Ehrenborg, and Emilia Elmblad. Visits to female inmates were intended to boost their morale and develop their character via religious education. They were met by resistance from the prison authorities as well as the prison chaplain. Ehrenborg took charge of the vagrants, Cederschiöld the thieves and Foy the child murderers, while Bremer jumped in where she was needed, and whenever Ehrenborg was absent, she took over the vagrants, among whom she felt very comfortable and even identified with:

Had it not been for the way I was brought up and my social position, I may have belonged with them. I do not believe I would have murdered my children or any other person, nor would I have stolen, it seemed to me to be so vulgar. But to run along the streets and scream and argue, drink me intoxicated, use foul language and insult the police; that would have been more in my taste. I would have found that amusing!

In 1868, Foy and Cederschiöld founded a Deaconess Institute in Jämtland and Norway.

=== Herrestad Grandmother ===
Foy wrote several times about Emilie Petersen, known as Mormor på Herrestad ('the Herrestad Grandmother'), a woman famed for her charitable work institutions on her estate, whom she often visited. In 1855, she described her first prayer for missions work there:

...the whole courtyard was full of people, hundreds of people, a feast that lasted almost three days and alternated with singing, praying and reading. It was a beautiful sight. All these attentive faces facing one way, and around them the beautiful setting of fresh Nordic nature, splendid trees, lindens, oaks and the beautiful silver birch, so common in Småland. In the background was Herrestad's ore-rich lake and a clear Nordic sky. It was a painting of great beauty, but the main feature of the painting, however, was that it was sanctified by His presence, called in Scripture "a flower of Sharon," "a lily of the valley."

In 1858, four anonymous pamphlets, 32 pages each in small format 100 x 67 mm, were published by the cantor Per Palmquist (1815–1887), including "Mormor på Herrestad". In it, Foy tells how it was not possible to be idle at Petersen's: "One was carried along by a current and one was ashamed if one was not in a hurry." She had to find six Bible quotes with the word head in them in order to sew six small hats "to be sent to Lapland to the poor children in the schools there"; when she found eleven Bible quotes, it was not a question of choosing six of them, but of sewing five more hats.

Foy also tells how Petersen became a purveyor to the court, how she started a working society with help from her native Germany in a time of severe famine, and how King Charles XIV John – because it was written in foreign newspapers without his knowledge that Sweden's distress required foreign aid – sent the governor to investigate the situation; the result of the governor's report was that the king placed an order for 1,500 riksdaler worth of cloth annually for as long as he lived and she continued with her workers' association.

In 1853–1859, Foy wrote about Petersen and her efforts in the English journal Evangelical Christendom.

== Legacy ==
Today, Foy is counted among 300 Schwedische Personlichkeiten, listed in Commemoratives of Famous Women, as well as one of "Three names which are often put alongside Frederika Bremer in reference to the Christian charity work of the 1850s" in Sweden alongside Maria Cederschiöld and Betty Ehrenborg.

== Works ==
- 1858–1860 editor for Christelig månadsskrift för barn, kantorn P. Palmquist förlag (died 1887); various contributions under the pseudonym 'Tante Ester'
- 1858 Mormor på Herrestad, 32 p., published by P. Palmqvist. Stockholm
- 1858 Missionsbönerna på Herrestad, 32 p., published by P. Palmqvist. Stockholm
- 1860 Din tid är Herrans! Ett bref från Götheborg af M. F., published by P. Palmqvist. Stockholm, P. P. Elde & c,. [Projekt Runeberg]
- 1865 Alpernas Israel, eller Valdenserna förr och nu / af M.F. [from Alexis Muston, L'Israel des Alpes, Paris 1852]
- 1866 Fru Lawsons hem, af M. F., published by P. Palmqvist, Stockholm, A. Holmberg & s.,
- 1866 Ingen krona för mig!, adapted from the French by M.F., P. Palmqvist. Stockholm, A.Holmberg & c.
