= Jeanette Berglind =

Swedish sign language teacher (1816–1903)

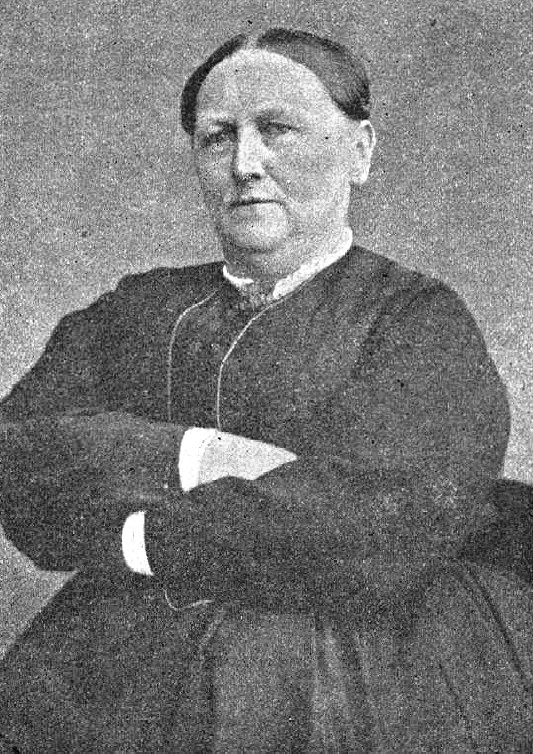
- Berglind on 23 August 1895
- Born: Johanna Apollonia (Jeanette) Berglind; August 21, 1816; Stockholm, Sweden
- Died: September 14, 1903 (aged 87); Stockholm, Sweden
- Occupation: Teacher of the deaf
- Known for: Founding one of the first schools for the deaf in Sweden

Johanna "Jeanette" Apollonia Berglind (21 August 1816, in Stockholm – 14 September 1903, in Stockholm), was a Swedish sign language teacher and principal. In 1860, she founded one of the first schools for the deaf and mute in her country: Tysta Skolan (Silent School) in Stockholm.

== Biography ==
Johanna Berglind became an orphan early in life and was adopted by a widow: from about the age of ten, she was the ward of a relative of her late mother, Per Aron Borg, who was the pioneer of the education of deaf and mute in Sweden and the founder and principal of Manillaskolan (originally Allmänna institutet för Blinda och Döfstumma, 'Public Institute of the Blind and Deaf') in Stockholm. Berglind had weak health for many years after having broken her leg at the age of three.

From 1834 to 1840, she was a teacher at the institute for the deaf and mute operated by Borg. After his death in 1839, she supported herself as a governess, housekeeper and a lady's companion. Berglind had the ambition to found a school pension for the deaf and saved her salary to finance it. In April 1860, she started the Tysta Skolan with the few students and one additional teacher that she could afford. The costs were too great for her small fund, however. In 1862, Fredrika Bremer described her work in the press and asked for contributions. This brought the project recognition around the country and attracted a lot of attention from private benefactors: a school board was made and the school was given the protection of King Charles XV and Queen Louise and given governmental support. This made it possible for her to acquire a proper building for the school in 1866, and by 1872 the school was no longer in debt and reportedly filled a great need: in 1863, she had been forced to deny 75 students because of the costs.

Berglind was described as a humble and warm personality, which gained a lot of support from private financiers because of her agreeable personality. She was described as a tender mother to her students, as one of her goals with the school had been to see to their emotional needs as well. As an educator, she had been instructed in sign language by her mentor Borg, and she preferred this method at her school: she did introduce speaking methods to her students in 1868, but did not consider it a success. She accepted students with an individual fee. She was the principal of the school from 1860 to 1882. Her school was highly regarded: three of her female students were to serve as teachers at the later public schools for the elderly deaf and mute. In 1880, she was promised a governmental pension on the date of her retirement. Berglind retired in September 1882.

== Awards ==
She was given the gold royal medal För medborgerlig förtjänst (In Service of the State) and a pension from the state. The same year, she was made honorary chairperson in the Stockholm Deaf and Mute Society.

== See also ==
- Caroline Yale

== Other sources ==
- Wilhelmina Stålberg, P. G. Berg. Berglind, Johanna (Anteckningar om svenska qvinnor)
- Svenska kvinnor. Föregångare Nyskapare - Carin Österberg ISBN 91-87896-03-6
- Jeanette A Berglind, urn:sbl:18627, Svenskt biografiskt lexikon (art av Erik Hanson.), hämtad 2014-08-14.
