= Jacob Bremer =

Swedish merchant and industrialist

Jacob or Jakob Bremer (19 June 1711 – 5 September 1785) was a Swedish merchant and industrialist.

== Life ==
Bremer was born on 19 June 1711 in Västerås, Sweden, to Isak Bremer and Anna Hult.

After school, he worked for the Västmanland provincial government for two years before moving in 1727 to Åbo (now Turku, Finland), where he became a successful merchant, shipowner, and industrialist.

Jacob Bremer was the richest business person in Finland and the biggest ship owner in Åbo. He was also a partner or shareholder in the Åbo sugar factory, the town's two tobacco factories, the Järvenoja paper factory, the Åvik glass factory, the Kuppis brick factory, the Koski and Luvia sawmills, the Swedish East India Company, and several smaller businesses, as well as the owner or landlord of various manors, farms, and inns.

He married Margareta Pipping (1723–1766), the daughter of Åbo's administrator (rådmann) Josef Pipping, on 13 January 1741. She died on 23 April 1766 and, on 18 April 1767, he married the 21-year-old Ulrika Fredrika, the daughter of the judge (hovrättsassessorn) Erik Gustav Salonius.

By his first wife, he was the father of 11 children, of which five survived into adulthood: Isac Bremer (1741–1774), Josef Bremer (1743–1814), Anna Magdalena Bremer (1747–1769), Margareta Lovisa Krabbe (1754–1803) and Reinhold Bremer (1764–1809). By his second wife, he was the father of Carl Fredrik Bremer (1770–1830), whose daughter Fredrika became Sweden's most successful 19th-century novelist. They also had a daughter Agata Bremer (1774–1810), who died unmarried in Stockholm, Sweden.

Jacob Bremer died on 5 September 1785 in Åbo. After his death his widow Ulrika Fredrika Bremer took over his businesses and ships. She managed the business empire successfully until her own death in 1798.
