= Harriet Burbank Rogers =

American educator (1834–1919)

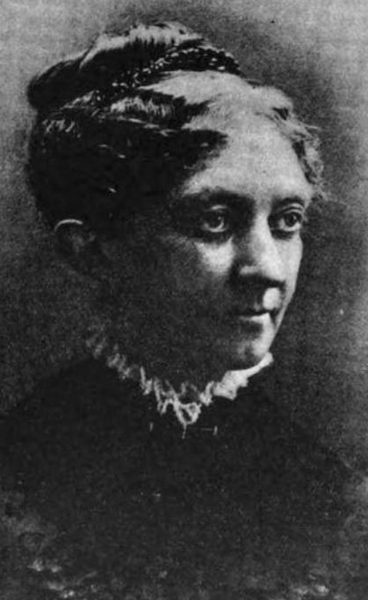
- Harriet Burbank Rogers, from a 1927 issue of The Volta Review
- Born: April 12, 1834; North Billerica, Massachusetts
- Died: December 12, 1919 (aged 85); North Billerica, Massachusetts
- Occupation: Educator

Harriet Burbank Rogers (April 12, 1834 – December 12, 1919) was an American educator, a pioneer in the oral method of instruction of the deaf. She was the first director of Clarke School for the Deaf, the first U.S. institution to teach the deaf by articulation and lip reading rather than by signing. Her advocacy for oralist instruction children increased utilization of oral-only communication models in many American schools.

She opposed the total communication approach that allows use of manual communication in addition to oral speech. The ability to gain understanding of specific information is greatly limited in an oral-only environment dependent on lipreading, where a profoundly deaf person with perfect vision is on average only able to understand less than one-third of what is spoken. As result, such oralist-only methods have been widely denounced by Deaf individuals deprived of language and vocabulary from the use of such methods.

== Biography ==
=== Early years ===
Harriet Burbank Rogers was born on April 12, 1834, in North Billerica, Massachusetts, one of five daughters of Calvin Rogers. She graduated from Massachusetts State Normal School (now Framingham State College) in 1851, after which she taught at several schools in Massachusetts. She became interested in teaching children with special needs, probably through the experience of her sister, who worked as a teacher of deaf-blind children.

=== Teaching the deaf ===
Rogers became interested in the European method of teaching the deaf, which emphasized teaching of articulation through imitation of breathing patterns and larynx vibrations, rather than sign language. Hearing people viewed these methods as superior. Rogers read German authors and received most of her knowledge through books.

Although she had no formal education to teach deaf children, in 1863, she was hired as a private tutor by the Cushing family to train their deaf daughter, Fanny. Rogers initially used both oral and sign methods, instructing Fanny to speak and to use her fingers to spell words. However, Rogers soon became aware that it was unwise to use both methods, so she turned completely toward the oral method. As Fanny gradually learned to speak, Rogers and her method became famous throughout the state.

Her success in teaching Fanny attracted the attention of Gardiner Hubbard, the Massachusetts businessman whose daughter Mabel was also deaf (she would later marry Alexander Graham Bell). Hubbard substantially supported Rogers, helping her to set up a school for the deaf in 1866, in Chelmsford, Massachusetts. The school initially had five students.

=== Auditory/oral vs. sign language ===
Rogers initially met strong resistance in using her oral method of education, as the educators of the deaf in the United States were traditionally inclined toward sign language. The controversy between auditory/oral and sign language educational method is an old controversy in deaf education. In the United States, ever since Thomas Hopkins Gallaudet founded the American School for the Deaf in Hartford, Connecticut, in 1817, the sign language method dominated deaf education. On the other hand, in Europe the auditory/oral method was the preferred method of education of the deaf.

Both approaches have certain pros and cons. The oral method stresses the importance of speech and oral language development. It emphasizes lips- and contextual-visual-clues-reading from the face and body. It also teaches to speak rather than to sign. The major drawback of this method, however is that it requires lot of time and effort from teachers to teach an individual even the basic words, and little can be unsterstood without additional visual cues like fingerspelling. Sometimes the results are quite limited, with an individual being able to speak only a dozen or more words.

On the other side, sign language is a fully developed and autonomous language which individuals can learn with relative ease. It can be used to express a whole range of things which are impossible for individuals who can utilize only a limited amount of words. The drawback, however, is that deaf individuals sometimes totally depend on signing, and can barely communicate with people who do not know sign language.

=== Clarke School for the Deaf ===
In 1867, John Clarke, a wealthy merchant who lost his hearing in his later years, opened a school for the deaf in Northampton, Massachusetts. He invited Rogers to serve as its first director. The school was the first U.S. institution to teach the deaf by articulation and lip reading rather than by signing. It was also the first school that emphasized the need to start teaching children at an early age.

Rogers served as the director at the Clarke School from 1867 to 1886. She worked at the school with Alexander Graham Bell, who implemented his father's Visible Speech System to teach instructors in the oral method of teaching.

=== Later years ===
Poor health forced Rogers to leave the directorship of the Clarke School in 1886, and was succeeded by Caroline A. Yale. She returned to her home in North Billerica, Massachusetts, where she opened a kindergarten.

Harriet Burbank Rogers died on December 12, 1919, aged 85, in North Billerica, Massachusetts.

== Legacy ==
The oral method of instruction was initially opposed by many in the United States, where sign language was preferred as the primary mode of communication for the deaf. However, Rogers' success in teaching deaf children to speak swayed public opinion on this matter in another direction, opening the door for the method of auditory/oral instruction in many American schools.
