= Visan om solen, månen och planeterna =

Song
- Language: Swedish
- Composer(s): Ludwig van Beethoven
- Lyricist(s): Betty Ehrenborg-Posse

Visan om solen, månen och planeterna is a poem written by Betty Ehrenborg-Posse, published in 1868 in Folkskolans läsebok. As a song it is, just like the Anthem of Europe, sung to the same tune as Beethoven's 9th symphony. The lyrics teach geography, astronomy and the four Northern Hemisphere temperate seasons. Nowadays, often just the closing verse is sung, named Månaderna, Januari börjar året, Månadsvisa or Visan om året.

In the 1977 children's song book Smått å gott, the lyrics rika härliga framgå have been replaced by Härlig sommar är det då.

== Publication ==
- Nu ska vi sjunga, 1943, under the lines "Årstiderna", credited as "old rhyme".
- Smått å Gott, 1977 (as "Månaderna", credited as an "old rhyme", with "music out of Beethoven's 9th symphony")
- Barnvisor och sånglekar till enkelt komp, 1984, credited as music out of Beethovens 9th symphony) as well as using "Oh My Darling, Clementine" as an alternate tune, splitting the first verse up into two verses, opening the second with "Juli.."
- Barnens svenska sångbok, 1999, under the lines "Sånger för småfolk".
