= Maria Cederschiöld (deaconess) =

Swedish noble deaconess and nurse

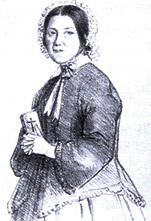
Maria Cederschiöld.

Anna Maria Cederschiöld (20 November 1815 in Växjö - 7 January 1892 in Lund) was a Swedish noble deaconess and nurse. She was a pioneer in the education of deaconesses and nursing in Sweden, and the first head of the first Deaconess institution in Sweden, Ersta diakoni, in 1851-1862.

== Life ==
She was the daughter of the vicar in Forsheda, Kasper Hakvin Cederschiöld, and Helena Sofia Ingelman. She was engaged to her foster brother, but the engagement was broken by his death, an event which is thought to have caused her interest in religion and introduced her in religious circles.

She was educated at home and managed a girls school in Lund in 1848-49, before she was promised the place as head of the future Deaconess Institution, which was at that point planned to be founded in Stockholm. In order to prepare herself, she studied the deaconess institution in Germany 1850-51, before she returned to take her place as head of the Ersta Diakoni in Stockholm, which was founded upon her return in 1851. This was the first formal education of nurses in Sweden: a secular nursing training was not to be opened until that of Emmy Rappe in 1867.

In Germany, she studied at Kaiserswerth under Theodor Fliedner just as Florence Nightingale. She had been recommended this position by a friend from the religious circles in Lund, where she was well known. During her tenure as principal and deaconess, "Sister Maria" became known for her hard work, in particularly during the cholera in Stockholm in 1853. In 1854, she co-founded the Fruntimmersällskapet för fångars förbättring in Stockholm with philanthropist Mathilda Foy, writer Fredrika Bremer, writer Betty Ehrenborg and Emilia Elmblad, founder of the Stockholm home for reformed prostitutes. She also founded a home for former prostitutes near the deaconess institution.

In 1862, she retired because of exhaustion. She had been expected to return to her position after her health had been recovered, but she never did so. She moved to Osby with her mother and another deaconess, and in 1877 to Växjö. In 1889, she visited Norway to participate in the planning of the first deaconess institution in Oslo.

== See also ==
- Amanda Cajander
