= Lovisa Åhrberg =

First recognised female doctor in Sweden

Maria Lovisa Åhrberg
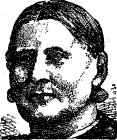
- Born: 17 May 1801; Uppsala
- Died: 26 March 1881 (aged 79); Stockholm
- Occupations: Doctor, Surgeon

Notes
- Possibly the first female doctor in Sweden.

Maria Lovisa Åhrberg or Årberg (17 May 1801 – 26 March 1881) was a Swedish surgeon and medical doctor. She was lawfully practicing surgeon long before it became formally permitted for women to study medicine at a university in 1870. Lovisa Åhrberg could be regarded as the first female physician in Sweden with formal permit from the authorities to practice medicine: however, she had no formal training, and the first woman physician with a university degree was to be Karolina Widerström.

== Biography ==
Lovisa Åhrberg was born in Uppsala in Uppland as the daughter of Erik Årberg, a caretaker of the Uppsala University, and the cunning woman Britta Maria Upgren. Her grandmother had also reportedly been an active practitioner of "folk medicine" and nursing. In the early 19th-century, nurses were merely uneducated helpers to the doctors. During her childhood, Lovisa accompanied her mother to hospitals as well as visits to the houses of sick people. She was never formally a student at any medical school but she was informally educated in medicine by observation.

As an adult, Lovisa Åhrberg settled in the capital of Stockholm to work as a domestic maid for a middle-class family. In her spare time she helped people afflicted with various injuries, wounds and illnesses. Evidently, this started when her help was requested by friends from Uppsala, where her background was known. Because of her successful treatments the word began to spread about her knowledge in health care and she was more and more sought after by clients around Stockholm for medical treatment. Initially her patients were poor folk but as time progressed wealthier people began to hire her and paid handsomely for her services. Not long after, she was able to leave her position as a maid, and from circa 1840, could support herself solely as, in effect, a doctor.

This was in practice not that unusual: in the countryside, women practiced medicine under the role of cunning folk, such as Hanna Svensdotter (1798–1864), who was widely reputed as "The Doctoress in Wram" for her specialty in treatment of leg injuries "far outside of Scania". The practice of Lovisa Åhrberg was however regarded as more controversial.

=== Quackery charge ===
While Lovisa Åhrberg was in practice a successful and popular medical practitioner, she had no license to practice as a doctor. Her training and knowledge, though apparently efficient and sufficient, had no background in any formal medical training or medical degree. This was in any case impossible for a female at the time, as women were not allowed to study medicine at the university before 1870.

In contrast to her contemporary Kisamor, who was also a popular female medical practitioner, but who had a long tradition of "folk healing" to support herself in her activity in the countryside, Åhrberg was met with great opposition from male doctors when she started to become known as a self-supporting female doctor in the city. Formal charges were directed against her, and she was duly investigated by the medical authorities for quackery.

Upon examination, however, Lovisa Åhrberg was deemed to have sufficient medical knowledge for the practice she was conducting and free from all forms of harmful practice. She was thereby acquitted from quackery and given permission to practice medicine, despite the fact that this was formally banned for females. Her position could be compared with that of her contemporary Amalia Assur, who was given special dispensation to practice dentistry despite the fact that this was prohibited for females. An additional reason for her acquittal was that Åhrberg was foremost active as a surgeon and that the medical aid she offered her patients' illnesses were natural herbal remedies.

On 12 May 1852, Lovisa Åhrberg was awarded by King Oscar I of Sweden with a medal in silver for Medborgerlig Förtjänst ('Citizen Service'), which in contemporary society was regarded as a final legitimization of her work as a physician.

=== Charity work ===
Lovisa Åhrberg was admired by Fredrika Bremer, who mentions her in her famous novel Hertha in 1856:

Be it permissible for me to here utter a word of regard and recognition for the doctoress in Stockholm, Miss Årberg, and add the wish that some of the wealthy people, who occasionally send their carriages to fetch the skillful doctoress, would like to, at one time or another, witness the reception she daily gives to the poor people of Stockholm, who hurry through her open doors with their wounds and injuries; they would, as much as we do, be taken by admiration upon the never ending patience, the good humour and the generosity, by which she gives her time, her care and her ointments to the thousands, who have nothing to give her but the thank you which for some low minded people are made to be ungrateful. They would as we do feel a wish to give her a better location for her good work, than the one she now has more or less on the street, and means to continue it without too much loss, and then they would, perhaps, more happily do what they wish.

The novelty of a female doctor of the time was illustrated by the fact that Åhrberg was normally not referred to as "doctor" but called "The wound healer doctoress" and "Maiden Åberg". Åhrberg is portrayed in a book about famous Swedish women published in 1864–1866. Her clinic is here described as a "poor man's clinic" because she so often treated poor people. This contemporary book reports, that Åhrberg's own health had become so damaged by hard work that she on several occasions had to take leave and rest in the resort of Carlsbad. The article ends the report:

One can only hope, that the only too much applied strength to at least some extent will continue to support her, to benefit the great number of people, who still rely upon her care.

In 1870, the medical profession was formally opened to women in Sweden when women were accepted as student in the medical faculties of the universities, with Karolina Widerström becoming the first woman physician with a formal medical university degree and license to practice medicine.

In 1871, Lovisa Åhrberg became blind and retired. She lived a comfortable life in her retirement, as she left a fortune when she died. Only one student was ever reported to have been tutored as her apprentice, a certain "Doctoress Henricsson", who worked at the Serafimerlasarettet for several years before opening her own practice in 1865: she was officially referred to as a nurse, but the profession of a trained nurse did not exist at the time she was listed as such, so her profession seem to have been as difficult to define as that of Åhrberg herself.

She died in Stockholm in 1881.
