= Tegnér =

Tegnér or Tegner is a Swedish surname. Notable people with the surname include:

- Alice Tegnér (1864–1943), Swedish music teacher, poet and composer
- Bruce Tegner (1929–1985), American martial artist, author, and actor
- Elof Tegnér (1844–1900), Swedish historian, author and librarian
- Erik Tegner (1896–1965), Danish tennis player
- Esaias Tegnér (1782–1846), Swedish writer, professor of Greek, and bishop
- Esaias Tegnér Jr. (1843–1928), Swedish linguist
- Hans Tegner (1853–1932), Danish artist
- Isaac Wilhelm Tegner (1815-1893), Danish lithographer
- Mathias Tegnér (born 1979), Swedish politician
- Rudolph Tegner (1873–1950), Danish sculptor
- Torsten Tegnér (1888–1977), Swedish athlete

== See also ==
- Tegner Township, Kittson County, Minnesota
- Tegnér church
