= Caroline Yale =

American specialized educator (1848–1933)

Caroline Ardelia Yale
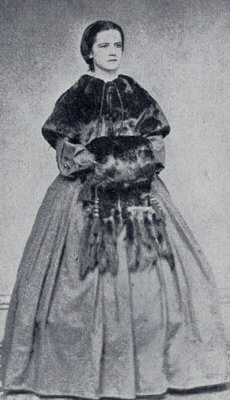
- Caroline Ardelia Yale
- Born: September 29, 1848; Charlotte, Vermont, U.S.
- Died: July 2, 1933 (aged 84); Northampton, Massachusetts, U.S.
- Education: Mount Holyoke College
- Occupation: Educator
- Known for: Clarke School for the Deaf, Northampton Vowel and Consonant Charts, teacher
- Family: Yale family

Caroline Ardelia Yale (September 29, 1848 – July 2, 1933) was an American inventor and educator who revolutionized the teaching of hearing-impaired students. A collaborator of Alexander Graham Bell, her phonetic system became the most widely used in America.

She worked most of her career at the Clarke School for the Deaf, eventually becoming Principal of the institution, and was involved in raising funds for the deaf through leading figures such as her childhood friend, Grace Coolidge, First Lady of the United States. She was also director and cofounder of the Alexander Graham Bell Association for the Deaf and Hard of Hearing.

== Biography ==
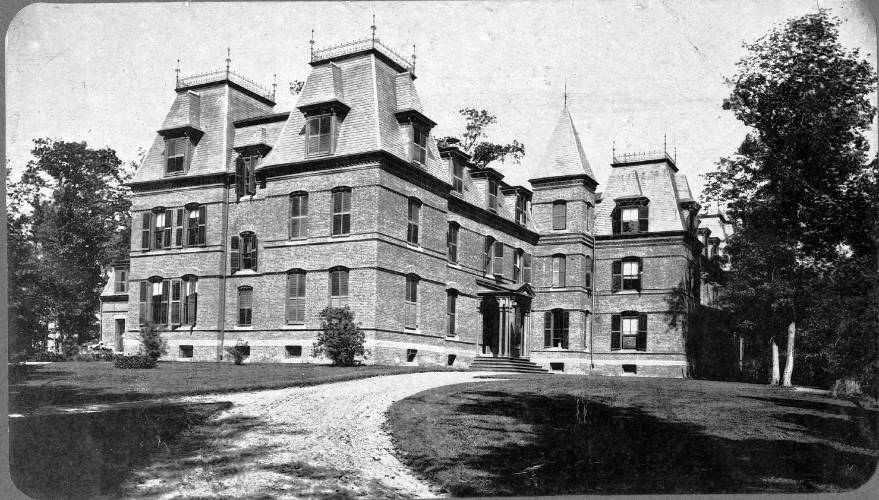
Clarke School for the Deaf

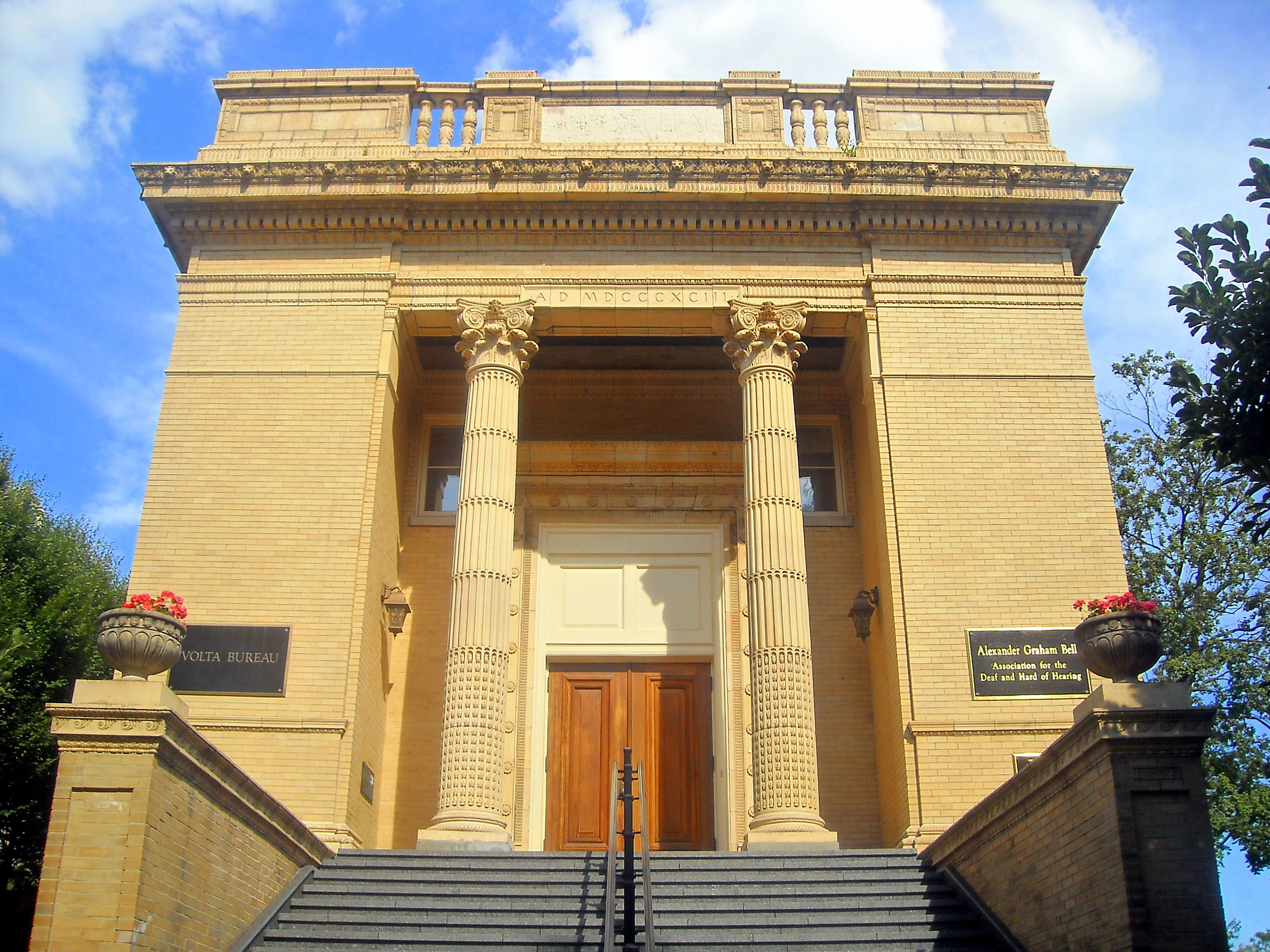
Alexander Graham Bell Association for the Deaf and Hard of Hearing, Caroline Yale was a cofounder and its director

Caroline Ardelia Yale was born to William Lyman Yale and Ardelia Strong on September 29, 1848, in Charlotte, Vermont, where she lived until the age of ten. Her father was deacon of the Congregational Church and helped establish Williston Academy, while her paternal grandfather, Lyman Yale, was a captain during the War of 1812, alongside his cousin major general Hezekiah Barnes, son of Lois Yale; her maternal grandfather was a doctor. She was a member of the Yale family, and a distant relative of Sarah Yale, the mother-in-law of William Henry and Samuel Henry, grandfather and uncle of abolitionist Laura Spelman, wife of John D. Rockefeller, as well as of another uncle of Mrs. Rockefeller. Caroline's brother, John Lyman Yale, a manufacturer, was a neighbor of Grace Coolidge, later First Lady of the United States as wife of U.S. president Calvin Coolidge, and the Yales were friends of the Coolidges as Grace was sent to live with them as a child. Captain John L. Yale was a member of the 13th Vermont Infantry Regiment and the 17th Vermont Infantry Regiment and fought at the Battle of Gettysburg and at the Siege of Petersburg during the American Civil War. His daughter, June Yale, also became a friend of Grace and was later hired as a teacher at Clarke School for the Deaf.

June married Albert L. Edgerton Crouter, headmaster of the Pennsylvania School for the Deaf, and later, cofounder of the American Association to Promote the Teaching of Speech to the Deaf, becoming its president in 1904, succeeding Alexander Graham Bell. She became the mother of John Yale Crouter, director of the Rhode Island School for the Deaf, and June Yale Chittick, daughter-in-law of Dr. Chittick, head of the Vermont State Hospital.

Caroline later moved to Williston, Vermont, and was educated at home by tutors with the support of her parents. Her father was the President of the American Association to Promote the Teaching of Speech to the Deaf. She also attended schools in Williston, and from 1866 to 1868 she attended Mount Holyoke Seminary (which became Mount Holyoke College).

After completing her education she taught in schools in Brandon, Vermont, and Williston, Vermont, until 1870, when she began to work at the Clarke School for the Deaf in Northampton, Massachusetts. In 1873 she achieved the rank of associate principal, staying in that position until 1886, when she succeeded Harriet B. Rogers as the principal of the school. Although Harriet Burbank Rogers was the initial founder of the Clarke Institution, it was Caroline Yale who emerged as the institutional leader of the oral movement.

Caroline Yale worked for 63 years at the Clarke School for Hearing and Speech, including 36 years as principal. In 1882 she began to collaborate with another teacher to develop a more comprehensive system of phonetic symbols than Alexander Melville Bell's "Visible Speech". Together they developed the "Northampton Vowel and Consonant Charts", which she described in detail in her pamphlet Formation and Development of Elementary English Sounds, 1892. She also collaborated with Alexander Graham Bell and his father, Alexander Melville Bell, on the development of her phonetic system and teaching methods. This became the most widely used system in America.

In 1889 she established a teacher training department at Clarke School for the Deaf that had sent teachers to schools for the deaf in 31 states and 9 foreign countries before her death in Northampton on July 2, 1933. In 1919, she is featured as the Principal and one of the original corporators of that institution, along with Alexander Graham Bell, U.S. President Calvin Coolidge, President of National Geographic Society Gilbert Hovey Grosvenor, Inventor George Crompton, and President of Massachusetts Bar John C. Hammond.

== Later life ==
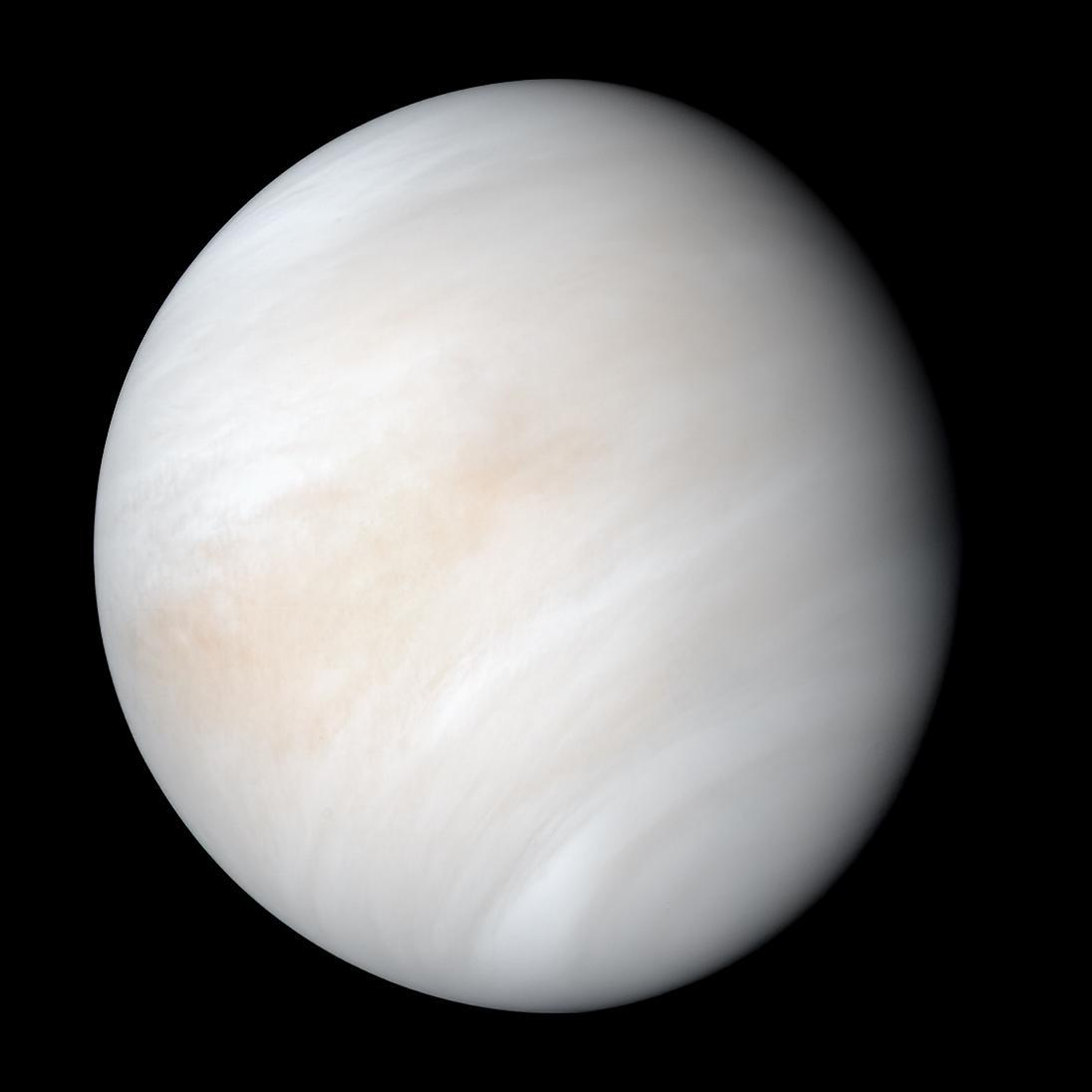
The Yale crater on planet Venus, named in 1994 in honor of Caroline Ardelia Yale and her contribution to the deafs

Caroline Ardelia's teaching methods became so widespread that by 1933 all but two of the 200 schools for the hearing impaired in America employed her oral teaching methods. At the Clarke School, she also developed programs for physical skills and athletics for hearing-impaired children. She hired Grace Goodhue of Burlington, Vermont, as a teacher who then became First Lady Grace Coolidge when she married U.S. President Calvin Coolidge. Grace Coolidge remained a lifelong fundraiser and strong supporter of the Clarke School.

In 1890 she helped organize the Alexander Graham Bell Association for the Deaf and Hard of Hearing, and became the director. She also served for 25 years on the Northampton School Committee before retiring from her position as principal of the Clarke School in 1922. After retiring she continued to direct the teacher training program and remained active with the Clarke School for many years.

In 1928, President Coolidge allowed a national fund-raising effort for Clarke's School for the Deaf with the help of Clarence Barron, President of the Dow Jones and owner of the Wall Street Journal. The aim was to build an international reputation for the institution. They raised 2 million dollars which were given to Caroline Ardelia, who was stuck in a wheelchair as the school's retired principal in her late years.

The major donors were William Boyce Thompson, E. P. Charlton, partner of Seymour H. Knox I, a cousin of Frank W. Woolworth of the Woolworth Tower, Henry Latham Doherty, Fred Morgan Kirby, the VP of F. W. Woolworth & Co., Andrew Mellon, the US Treasury Secretary, Cyrus H. K. Curtis of the Curtis Publishing Company, Edward Harkness, Standard Oil heir, William A. Paine of Paine Webber, which became UBS, Frank Philipps of Phillips Petroleum Company, and John J. Raskob, builder of the Empire State Building.

Caroline Ardelia received honorary doctorate degrees from Illinois Wesleyan University in 1896 and Mount Holyoke College in 1927. She published an autobiography, Years of Building-Memories of a Pioneer in a Special Field of Education.

The crater Yale on the planet Venus is named in her honor.

== See also ==
- Jeanette Berglind
