= Amy Segerstedt =

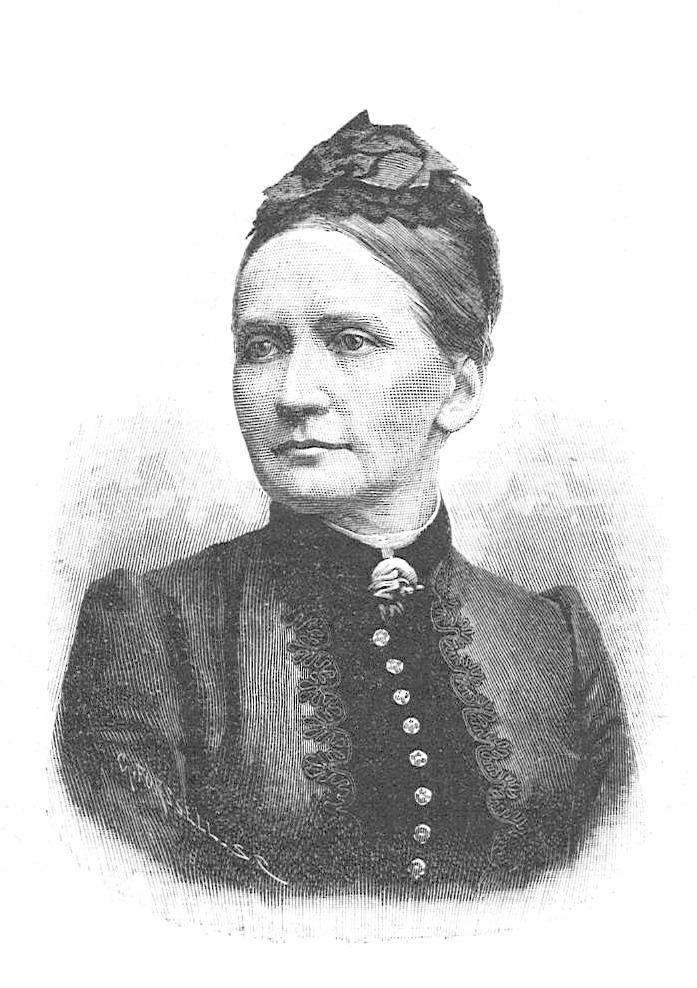
Amy Segerstedt, 1892

Amy Segerstedt (12 November 1835 – 16 November 1928) was a Swedish teacher, folk teacher, and philanthropist. She was the founder of the Braille Loan Library in Stockholm, and the Föreningen för blindskrift (Association for Braille) in Sweden. She was particularly interested in girls' vocational training.

== Biography ==
Amy Johanna Fredrika Segerstedt was born in Åmål on 12 November 1835. Her father was Fredrik Segerstedt (died 1856), a provincial doctor in Åmål. She had three sisters, Amy, Lovisa, and Wilhelmina, as well as one brother, Vitalis.

The family moved to Uppsala in 1860, where Segerstedt trained as a teacher at Klosterskolan (Thengbergska school) in 1861. She worked in 1861–1874 as a governess and in 1874–1879, as a teacher at Clara Lind's girls' school in Gävle. Her final year of training, 1879–1880, was at a teacher seminar at Falu folk high school seminar, where she graduated in 1880. That same year, she became director of the newly established elementary school for girls in Åmål. After studying the "Hillic speech method" at schools for the deaf in Denmark and Norway, she became the director of Tysta skolan ('Silent school') in Stockholm in 1882, remaining until 1894.

At a conference in 1885 in Paris, she saw the private Braille library created by the nobleman, Maurice de La Sizeranne. In April 1892, she founded the Swedish Braille Association (Föreningen för blindskrift), which published current literature in Braille. In December of that year, she opened a small lending library. It was housed in the Silent School in 1892–1895, then moved to the Blind Association, which in 1912 took it over and developed it into the Swedish Library of Talking Books and Braille (Tal- och punktskriftsbiblioteket, TPB), which is now called the Swedish Agency for Accessible Media (Myndigheten för tillgängliga medier, MTM). MTM previously awarded the Amy Prize (now merged into the Läsguldet award) which was named after her.

In 1901, Segerstedt and her younger sister Helmina moved to Gothenburg, and in 1912, Segerstedt moved back to Åmål to be close to her oldest sister, Louise Larsson. Segerstedt died on 16 November 1928 and is buried in her brother-in-law's (Petter Larsson) family grave at Åmål cemetery.
