= Fruntimmersällskapet för fångars förbättring =

Swedish charitable society

Fruntimmersällskapet för fångars förbättring ('Women's Society for the Reform of Prisoners') was a charitable society founded in Stockholm in Sweden in 1854. The purpose of the society was to visit female prisoners and work for their rehabilitation from a criminal life back in to society through religious and moral tuition and "spiritual nursing".

== History ==
The society was co-founded in Stockholm by philanthropist Mathilda Foy, writer Fredrika Bremer, deaconess Maria Cederschiöld, writer Betty Ehrenborg and Emilia Elmblad, founder of the Stockholm home for reformed prostitutes. The initiative was a part of the contemporary Pietist movement, which encouraged religiously influenced social work among women. This very same movement had been the inspiration for the foundation of the Deaconess institution Ersta diakoni only three years prior, and all the founders of the society were also actively involved in the Deaconess institution.

Despite resistance from the clergy and the prison director, in 1854 the women were given permission to visit female prisoners and manage a form of Sunday school among them with the purpose of "with prayer, bible studies and moral talk try to bring comfort to the women placed under arrest and if possible influence their reform for the better".

Mathilda Foy described the work of the society in an interview which was published in English long after the events took place. Betty Ehrenborg took charge of the vagrants, Maria Cederschiöld the thieves and Mathilda Foy the child murderers. Foy remarked: "I was glad to have been rid of the gentlemen onlookers [the vicar and the prison director], but found it odd to be surrounded by 120 child murderesses." Fredrika Bremer worked wherever she was needed, and took over the vagrants whenever Ehrenborg was absent, among whom she felt very comfortable:

"Had it not been for the way I was brought up and my social position, I may have belonged with them. I do not believe I would have murdered my children or any other person, nor would I have stolen, it seemed to me to be so vulgar. But to run along the streets and scream and argue, drink myself intoxicated, use foul language and insult the police; that would have been more in my taste. I would have found that amusing!"
