= Sophie Dedekam =

Norwegian composer and diarist

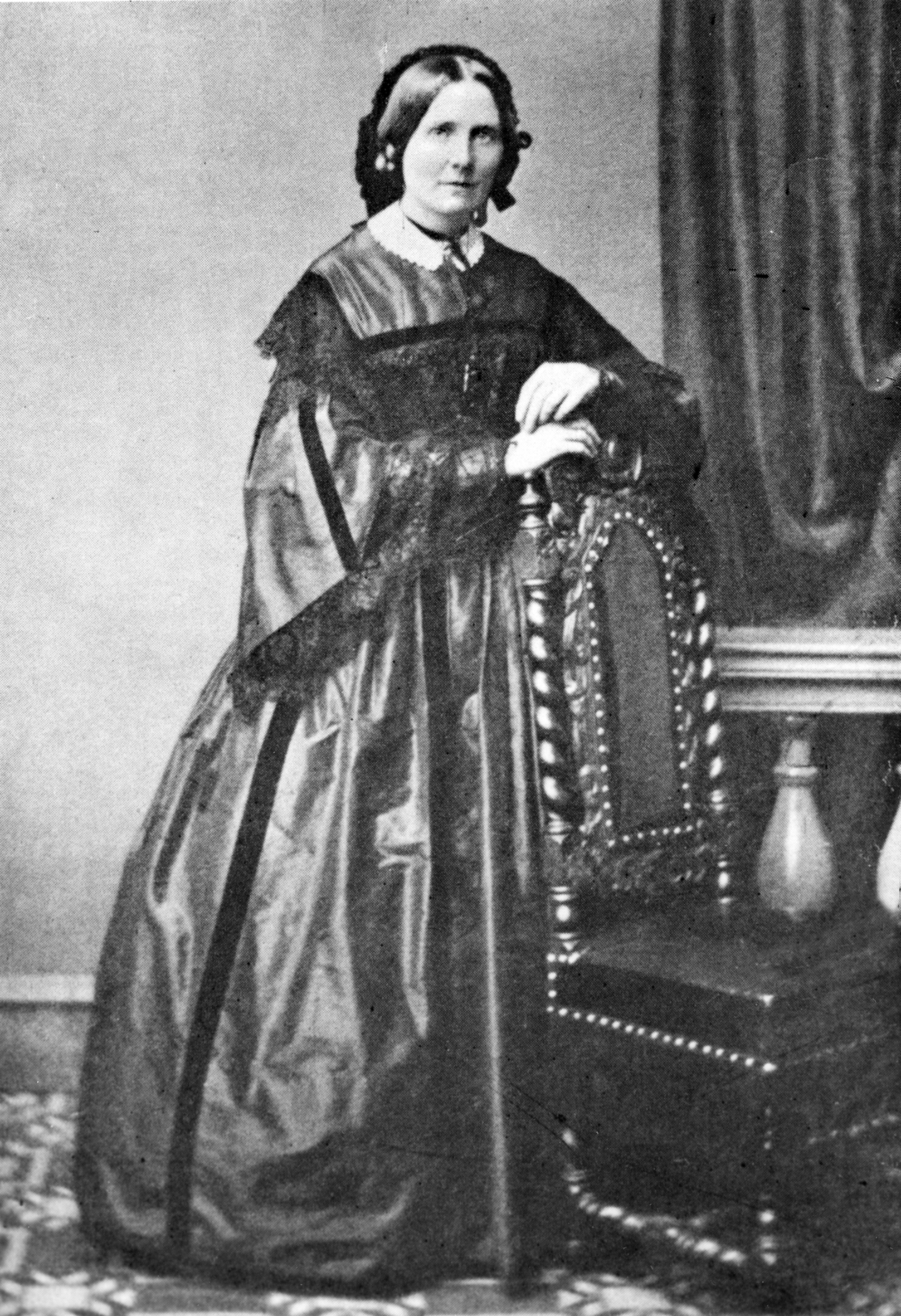
- Dedekam c. 1860
- Born: 1 April 1820; Arendal, Norway
- Died: 1 June 1894 (aged 74)
- Occupation: Composer

Sophie Dedekam (1 April 1820 – 1 June 1894) was a Norwegian composer and diarist, one of the most significant Norwegian women composers of the 19th century, and principally remembered today for a hymn included in the Church of Norway Hymn Book and for her published recollections of a visit to Paris.

Dedekam was born in the Norwegian coastal town of Arendal, the daughter of the town's mayor. She became active in the social and cultural life of the city at an early age, where she sang and played the piano. She traveled to Paris when she was 25 for a visit of several weeks, recording her experiences in letters and in a diary that were published after she died. Dedekam did some public concertizing as a singer and collaborative pianist early in her life, but most of her performing was limited to amateur venues in the Arendal area or at home with her family and friends.

Dedekam also composed songs from an early age, again mostly for local consumption. Many of her pieces were eventually published by Wilhelm Hansen Music Publishers (known today as Edition Wilhelm Hansen) in Copenhagen. A number of her songs became quite well known in Norway as a result, but Sophie rarely received recognition as their composer, nor did she seek it. Two of her songs were also published by Theodora Cormontan, another Norwegian woman composer from Arendal.

As an unmarried woman in 19th century Norway, Sophie Dedekam's economic vitality diminished after her father's death. She spent the remainder of her life staying with various friends and relatives, by all accounts a happy person who brought joy to those around her. She died at the farm of her sister and her sister's husband in 1894.

== Early life ==
Sophie Hedvig Dedekam was born in a southern Norwegian coastal town whose strong sea-related industries inspired a cosmopolitan environment, with organizations like the Dramatic Society and the Musical Society to help cultivate her talents. Her father, Morten Smith Dedekam (1793–1861), attended a private school in Copenhagen and studied business in England before returning to Arendal to work as a merchant. He entered local politics in 1823 and became the town's first mayor in 1837, a position he held until his death. Interested in history, Dedekam helped found the Arendal Museum in 1831 and served as its first director. Also passionate for the theater, as an amateur actor he appeared in over 160 roles.

In 1819 Morton Dedekam married his 17-year-old cousin, Margrethe Sophie Ebbel (1802–1854). The couple had five daughters and one son who lived to adulthood. An accomplished amateur pianist, Margrethe offered music lessons to her daughter, constituting the extent of Sophie's musical training. Sophie's autobiographic almanacs record the early manifestation of this training through singing and playing the piano at various society events to which she had access through her parents’ social and economic position. Her almanacs also note early efforts at composition, where Sophie described melodies coming to her intact, ready to be immediately written down. School records describe Sophie as an intelligent, lively, and engaged student. One of her teachers wrote "Sophie’s diligence, attention, and thoughtfulness always please me."

== Writing from Paris ==
At the age of 25, Sophie Dedekam traveled to Paris for a month's visit. She faithfully recorded in letters and in her diary her impressions of the music, theater, and art she encountered there. After hearing Meyerbeer’s "Robert le diable" she wrote "I could feel the blood rush from my cheeks . . . My God and Father, it was delightful! Yes, everything was glorious beyond measure; there are no words to describe one’s feelings when hearing such music." Upon visiting the Louvre, she penned "No one can blame an Arendal girl for getting carried away." Described by Cecilie Dahm as "an extraordinary writer," Dedekam's reflections present a unique image of mid-19th century Paris as seen through the eyes of a young Norwegian woman. Dedekam never dreamed that her writings would be published, but her grandnephew Henrik Harboe edited her letters and diary and published them in 1929 under the title "Dagbog of brev fra en reise til Paris i 1845." Oslo Solum republished the book in 2000.

== Performing in France ==
Sophie remained in France for about another four months after leaving Paris, apparently experiencing her most active period of concertizing outside of Arendal during this period. Thomas Tellefsen, the Norwegian pianist and composer who was a pupil and friend of Chopin, asked her to sing on one of his concerts. She also performed extensively during a stay in the French coastal city of Honfleur. Though warmly received, Dedekam appears to have never seriously considered a musical career. After a performance where she sang and served as a collaborative pianist for the Swedish violinist Erik Gustav Kolthoff (1814–1864), she wrote "He told me that ‘tout le monde’ said I had been ‘charmante’ and that I should cultivate my musical talent, etc., but I let him know that I was not so stupid as to believe him."

== Later life ==
Dedekam returned to Arendal and resumed her musical and social activity there. She continued to chronicle concerts she attended and concerts in which she performed, but only listed the events without additional commentary. The death of her mother in 1854 inspired Dedekam to a deeper spirituality and to embrace the pietistic movement emerging in Arendal at that time.

As an unmarried woman, the death of Sophie’s father in 1861 resulted in diminished economic resources that compelled her to live with family and friends for the rest of her life. She stayed with her life-long friend, the folklorist, bishop, and poet Jørgen Moe and his wife, as well as with relatives in Christiania (now Oslo). However, her main residence was the Kjonerud farm near Hamar, Norway--the home of Sophie’s sister Cathrine and her husband Waldemar Harboe.

Sophie’s niece, Emma Ree, wrote about her aunt Sophie’s presence at the Kjonerud farm: "With her [Sophie] many things went well, and there was always music in the home. She had a gift for bringing the best out of people, and even when they felt depressed she could talk to them and make them feel better." Emma Ree also recalled "Ah, I remember the evenings when she would gather everyone, young and old, family members and guests, around the piano. We loved to hear her sing, and her repertoire was great, ranging from Norwegian folk songs to lieder by Schubert to Danish vaudeville songs to the music of Halfdan Kjerulf and the Gunnar Wennerberg 'Psalms of David,' as well as her own songs. Each of us had a personal favorite. On the whole, she inspired us to appreciate great literature, great art, and everything that is pure and good." Sophie Dedekam died peacefully at the Kjonerud farm on June 1, 1894.

In her book on early Norwegian women composers, Cecilie Dahm concludes her chapter on Sophie Dedekam by writing "Sophie Dedekam was educated at home for the home. Her musical talent unfolded in her family circle, her writing talent in letters and diaries. [As a woman in 19th century Norway] she had no other alternatives. Sophie probably didn’t think about that; she lived in harmony with her times. It would be some time before women began to look differently at their talents and how they could express them."

== Musical Legacy ==
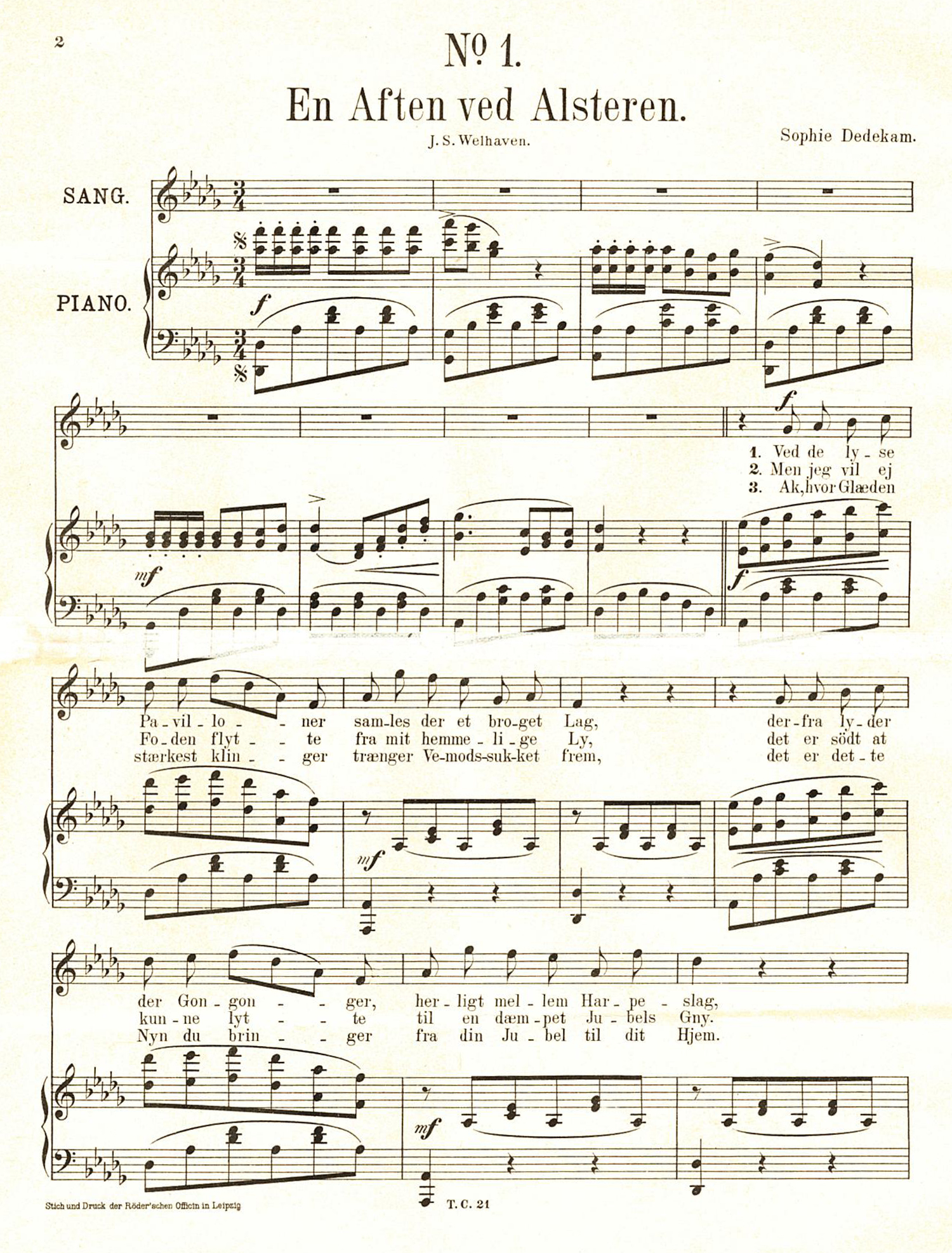
The first page of Sophie Dedekam's song "En Aften ved Alsteren"

About 40 of Dedekam's songs were published during her lifetime, despite her disinterest in public recognition. Perhaps her economic situation after 1861, coupled with the support of well-connected friends, resulted in their release. Her primary publisher was Wilhelm Hansen Music Publishers in Copenhagen. Established in 1857 when Jens Wilhelm Hansen decided to expand his engraving business, the success of the enterprise was significantly aided by his wife Hanne, especially when her husband experienced health issues after the first few years of business.

In the early 1880s Dedekam would turn to another woman composer from Arendal by the name of Theodora Cormontan, the first woman professional music publisher in Norway. The Cormontan Music Publishing Company released two Dedekam songs in 1885 with the apparent intent of publishing more than 40 of them, but Arendal's severe economic depression of 1886 resulted in the dissolution of Cormontan's business.

Dedekam's most enduring set of songs is her "6 Sange: udsatte for to syngestemmer og pianoforte" ("6 Songs for two voices and piano"), originally published by Wilhelm Hansen and reissued by Recital Publications in 2009. The collection includes "Sang af ‘Arne’" (text by Bjørnstjerne Bjørnson), "Naar Solen ganger til Hvile" (text by Valdemar Adolph Thisted), "De to Drosler" (text by Christian Winther), "Taaren" (text by Hans Christian Andersen), "Ungbirken" (text by Jørgen Moe), and "Hvad jeg elsker" (text again by Andersen). The works are representative of Dedekam's compositional style: engaging melodies, a literate sensitivity to the texts, and straightforward accompaniments. Their popularity during Sophie's lifetime and the lack of recognition she received for them are documented by Emma Ree as she notes how her aunt was amused "when she traveled along the coast [of Norway] and heard girls on the steamer and various groups wherever she went singing her songs 'Naar Solen ganger til Hvile,' 'Taaren,' 'De to Drosler,' etc. and nobody knew she was the composer. Her songs had all become folk songs."

== Hymns ==
The melody for which Sophie Dedekam is best remembered is "Naar Solen ganger til Hvile," originally composed with a text by Valdemar Adolph Thisted (1815–1887). Today it is better known in Norway as the tune associated with "Nå lukker solen sitt øye" by Christian Richardt (1831–1892). The sweet, simple melody and childhood-oriented poem that begins "Now the sun closes its eyes and I close mine" result in a beloved evening prayer song that appears in the current Church of Norway Hymn Book. It can also be found in the current Swedish hymn book with the title "Hur ljuvligt det är att möta," a setting of a Kirsten D. Hansen text translated by Jakob Bystrom in 1903. As hymn number 301, it is one of 325 ecumenical hymns common to almost all Christian denominations in Sweden.

This hymn tune, often referred to as "Dedekam," was utilized in a number of Norwegian-American Lutheran hymnals of the late 19th and early 20th centuries. These include Concordia Norsk (Augsburg Publishing, 1916), Fredsbasumen (Skoog and DeLander, 1899), and Sangbogen (edited by Reimstad and Gjertsen, 1912). Texts set to the Dedekam tune in these hymnals include "Hvor deilig det er at mode" by Kirsten D. Hansen (1850–1902), "Der er en underfud kilde" by Herman Richard Steffensen (1853–1907), "Et barn I dag er os givet" by Betty Ehrenborg (1818-1880), and "Her vandrer en pilegrimsskare" (uncredited author). The Dedekam hymn tune continues to appear in hymnals later in the 20th and into the 21st centuries, including The Psalter Hymnal (blue) published by the United Reformed Churches in North America and The Book of Psalms for Singing published by the Reformed Presbyterian Church of North America. Other tunes by Dedekam appeared in early Norwegian-American hymnals, notably "Taaren," with a text by H. C. Andersen.

== List of Works ==
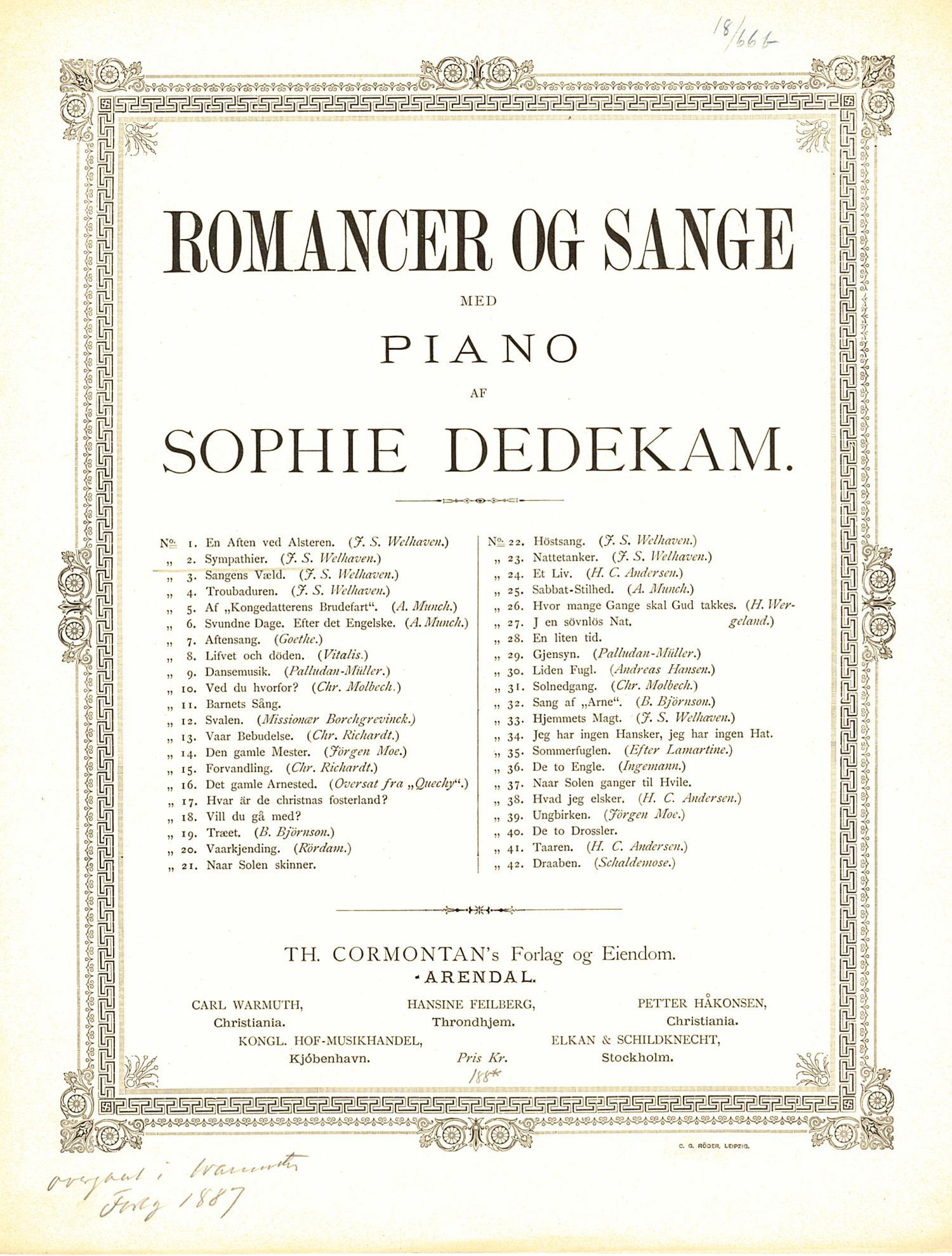
Front cover of Dedekam song "Sympathier"

The following 42 song titles (from the never-completed Cormontan Music Publishing Company's series "Romance og sange med piano af Sophie Dedekam") are listed on the front covers of Nos. 1 & 2, the only two Dedekam songs actually published by Theodora Cormontan. The poets are noted in parentheses.

- "1. En Aften ved Alsteren. (Johan Sebastian Welhaven)
- "2. Sympathier. (Welhaven)
- "3. Sangens Væld. (Welhaven)
- "4. Troubaduren. (Welhaven)
- "5. Af "Kongedatterens Brudefart." (Andreas Munch)
- "6. Svundne Dage. Efter det Engelske. (Munch)
- "7. Aftensang. (Johann Wolfgang von Goethe)
- "8. Lifvet och dödeb. (Vitalis)
- "9. Dansemusik. (Palludan-Müller)
- "10. Ved du hvorfor? (Christian Molbech)
- "11. Barnets Sång.
- "12. Svalen. (Missionær Borchgrevinck.)
- "13. Vaar Bebudelse. (Christian Richardt)
- "14. Den gamle Mester. (Jörgen Moe)
- "15. Forvandling. (Richardt)
- "16. Det gamle Arnested. (Oversat fra "Quechy.")
- "17. Hvar är de christnas fosterland?
- "18. Vill du gå med?
- "19. Træet. (Bjørnstjerne Bjørnson)
- "20. Vaakjending. (Rördam)
- "21. Naar Solen skinner.
- "22. Höstsang. (Welhaven)
- "23. Nattetanker. (Welhaven)
- "24. Et Liv. (Hans Christian Andersen)
- "25. Sabbat-Stilhed. (Munch)
- "26. Hvor mange Gange skal Gud takkes. (Henrik Wergeland)
- "27. J en sövnlös Nat.
- "28. En liten tid.
- "29. Gjensyn. (Palludan-Müller)
- "30. Liden Fugl. (Andreas Hansen)
- "31. Solnedgang. (Molbech)
- "32. Sang af "Arne." (Bjørnson)
- "33. Hjemmets Magt. (Welhaven)
- "34. Jeg har ingen Hansker, jeg har ingen Hat.
- "35. Sommerfuglen. (After Lamartine)
- "36. De to Engle. (Bernhard Severin Ingemann)
- "37. Naar Solen ganger til Hvile. (Valdemar Adolph Thisted)
- "38. Hvad jeg elsker. (Andersen)
- "39. Ungbirken. (Moe)
- "40. De to Drossler. (Christian Winther)
- "41. Taaren. (Andersen)
- "42. Draaben. (Schaldemose)
