= Ulrika Fredrika Bremer =

- Born: 24 April 1746
- Died: 1 April 1798 (aged 51)
- Occupations: Ship owner; merchant
- Years active: 1785–1798
- Spouse: Jacob Bremer (m. 1767)
- Family: Bremer family

Ulrika Fredrika Bremer, née Salonius (24 April 1746 Åbo – 1 April 1798), was a ship owner and merchant in Swedish Finland. She was the paternal grandmother of Fredrika Bremer. After the death of her husband Jacob Bremer in 1785, at the age of 39, she took over his businesses and ships in Åbo (now Turku, Finland). She successfully managed his business empire over 13 years and was one of the richest Finnish women of her time.

== Life ==
Salonius was the daughter of the high court judge Eric Gustaf Salonius (d. 1748) and Hedvig Magdalena Wittfooth (d. 1752), and married at the age of 21, the recently widowed merchant Jacob Bremer on 18 April 1767. He was 35 years her senior and had five children, most of them older than Ulrika.

Jacob Bremer was the richest business person in Finland and the biggest ship owner in Åbo. He was also a partner or shareholder in the Åbo sugar mill, the town's two tobacco factories, the Järvenoja paper mill, the Åvik glass factory, the Kuppis brick works, the Koski and Luvia sawmills, the Swedish East India Company, and several smaller businesses, as well as the owner or landlord of various manors, farms, and inns.

=== Business activity ===
At the death of her spouse in 1785, Ulrika Fredrika Bremer inherited her husband's guild membership and the right to manage his business empire in her own right. Although she was helped by her eldest two stepsons Isac Bremer (1741–1774) and Joseph Bremer (1743–1814) and her own son Carl Fredrik Bremer (1770–1830), the eldest Isac and the youngest Carl suffered from mental instability and lack of business acumen and she took it upon herself to manage the family holdings.

Under her management, the Bremer house maintained a dominant place in Finnish business life, and she left a great fortune after her death. During her lifetime, she was able to donate large sums to charity: she financed a scholarship to Åbo University, a free bed place at the hospital, and two large donations to the poor widows and orphans of both the Finnish and the Swedish parishes of Åbo. Her wealth made her a public figure in Åbo. In 1796, there were rumours that the Governor of Åbo wished to sell his office, and that Bremer considered buying it for her son-in-law; and then, the rumour claimed that she had reconsidered because she considered her son-in-law unfit for the position.

She also had a daughter Agata (Agathe) Bremer (1774—1810), who married two noblemen, first in 1790 to Adolf Ludvig Carleson and then in 1798 to Fabian Wrede af Elimä. Her stepson Joseph Bremer became an iron manufacturer, when he acquired Teijo ironworks in his possession in 1794, after marrying the sole heiress of Teijo ironworks, Anna Charlotta Kijk (1750—1800) in the late 1770s. Following her death 1798, her son Carl (the father of writer Fredrika Bremer sold all her businesses and moved to Sweden in 1804. The last business to be sold was Åvik glass factory in 1806.

== Other sources ==
- Suomen kansallisbiografia (National Biography of Finland)
- Biografiskt lexikon för Finland 1. Svenska tiden (2008).
