= Tysta skolan =

Swedish school for the deaf

Coordinates: 59°20′45″N 18°4′4″E

Location
- Sköldungagatan 7 Stockholm; Sweden

Information
- Other name: Yrkesskolan i Stockholm för hörselskadade
- School type: School for deaf children
- Established: 1860
- Founder: Jeanette Berglind
- Closed: 1971

Tysta skolan ('The Silent School') was a private school for deaf-mute children founded in 1860 by educator Johanna (Jeanette) Berglind in Stockholm, Sweden. The name refers to the initial teaching method, which was described as the "write-sign method". From 1866 to 1910, the school was located on a property at Norrtullsgatan 51–67 in present-day Vasastan. It was then moved to Lidingö where it initially provided practical and theoretical continuing education for deaf-mute girls before being converted into a vocational school in the 1930s. The school moved back to Stockholm in 1947 where it continued to teach until its closure in 1971. The Tysta Skolan Foundation continues to exist and distributes the income from the funds in the form of scholarships and grants.

== History ==
=== In Stockholm ===
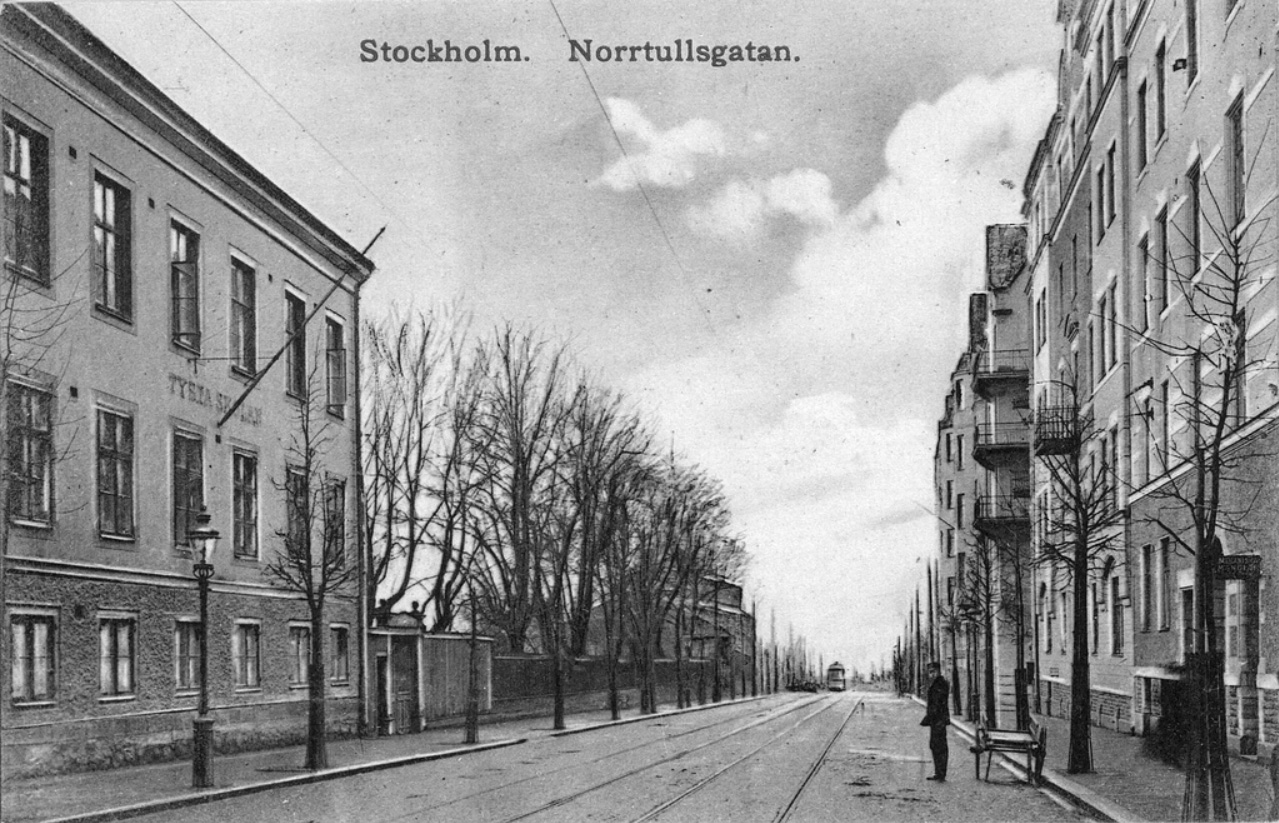
Tysta skolan at Norrtullsgatan

Tysta skolan was founded in 1860 by Jeanette Berglind, an educator who had previously worked at the Institute for the Blind and Deaf-mute at Manillaskolan. The school's home for deaf-mute children was initially housed in a cramped three-room apartment and kitchen at Norrlandsgatan 33, but moved in 1862 to more suitable accommodations in the Loviseberg ore yard at Stora Gråbergsgatan 25. Thanks to generous donations from patrons including King Charles XV and Queen Lovisa, the school was able to acquire artist Maria Ruckman's large property at Norrtullsgatan 51–57 (then 25) on the city's rural fringes in 1866. It consisted of several buildings, including the Altona inn, renamed by Carl Michael Bellman and converted into a school building, and a large area of land.

The children were received at the age of eight to ten years, and their education lasted about eight years. The home charged a fee of 150 kronor for half board and 350 for full board. In addition, there were also available spots for the less well-off. At first, only the writing and sign method (manualism) was used in teaching, as Berglind was opposed to oralism. In 1882, Berglind resigned from her role as headmistress, and Amy Segerstedt took over the position. From this year onwards, oralism was used in teaching. At this time the number of pupils increased to 18.

=== Move to Lidingö ===
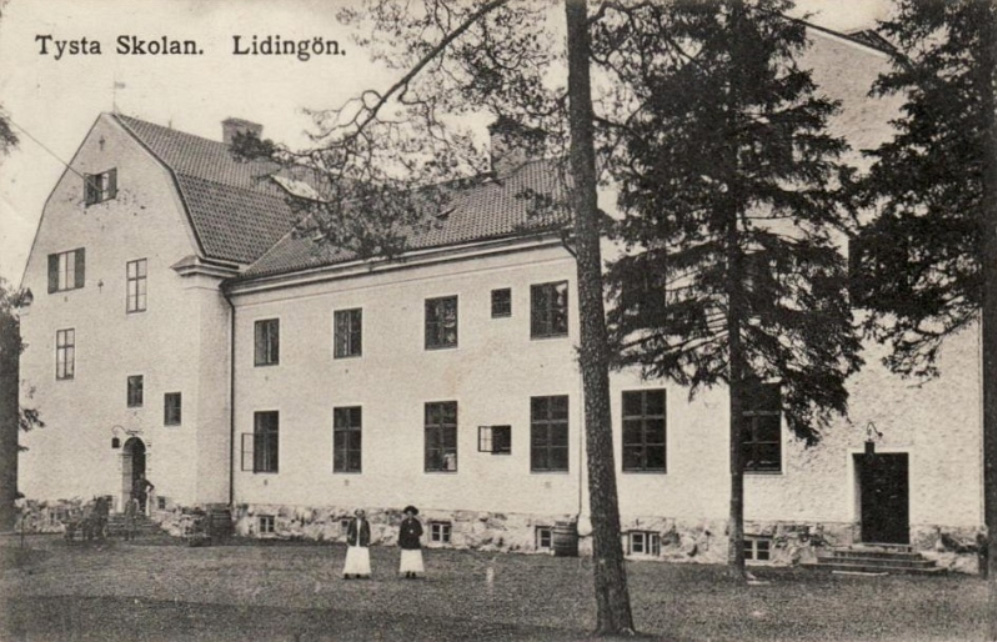
Tysta skolan at Lidingö, 1914

At the end of the 19th century, the rural surroundings were regulated for Vasastan's further expansion, with the land value of the property increasing sharply. In 1905, it was sold to the City of Stockholm for a purchase price of SEK 1 million, thus securing the future existence of the institution. In 1910, the school left the old premises (which were demolished in 1912) and temporarily rented a neighbouring property at Norrtullsgatan 24. With the help of the new capital, a plot of land at Floravägen in Lidingö villastad was acquired, where a new school building was built with space for 40 pupils and staff on duty, and the institution moved there in 1912.

In 1905 the teaching method was changed to practical-theoretical continuing education, while other new schools for the deaf were responsible for the primary education of the pupils. The school became a care and educational institution for deaf-mute girls. In 1918, the theoretical courses included instruction in the native tongue, Christianity, arithmetic, geography and history, health education and drawing. The practical curriculum included training in cooking and baking, sewing and weaving, in addition to laundry, cleaning and tidying. The school was free of charge, and the educational period lasted two years.

=== Vocational School in Stockholm for the Hearing Impaired ===
In 1938 the school was converted into a vocational school. In 1947 it moved to Sköldungagatan 7 in Lärkstaden in Stockholm, and in 1958 it changed its name to Yrkesskolan i Stockholm för hörselskadade ('The Vocational School in Stockholm for the Hearing Impaired'). The school was closed in 1971.

=== Tysta Skolan Foundation ===
The Tysta Skolan Foundation (Stiftelsen Tysta Skolan, STS), which provided the financial basis for the school, still exists today. The foundation manages the available funds and distributes the returns in the form of scholarships and grants. It is currently housed at Brahegatan 32.
