= Morten Smith Dedekam =

Norwegian politician (1793–1861)

- Born: 31 January 1793; Arendal
- Died: 28 April 1861 (aged 68)
- Education: commerce school in England
- Occupation: Politician
- Spouse: Sophie Hedevig Smith

Morten Smith Dedekam (31 January 1793 – 28 April 1861) was a Norwegian merchant and politician.

He was born in Arendal as a son of merchant Johan Collett Dedekam and his wife Sophie Hedevig Smith. He attended school in Copenhagen and commerce school in England, and opened his own business when returning to Arendal. He entered local politics in 1823, and when local government was introduced in 1837, he became one of the towns first mayors following, Salve Kallevig's business partner and friend Issac Leth who served as 'Stadstha uptmann' or Mayor prior to his death in 1835. After becoming Mayor, Dedekam sat until 1861.

He also wrote several books on his town and district, including 1860's Bidrag til Kjøbstaden Arendals Beskrivelse. He also co-founded Arendal Museum in 1831, and was the museum's first director.

He was married in June 1819 at Hisøy Church on the island of Hisøen. He married Margarethe Sophie Ebbell (1802–1854), a daughter of Ole Abraham Falk Ebbell and Cathrine Elisabeth Dedekam. Through her he was a brother-in-law of Ole Falk Ebbell. Descendants include Sophie Dedekam and Hans Ellefsen Dedekam. Morten Smith Dedekam died in April 1861, and was buried together with his wife at the family farm Tangen.
