= Betty Ehrenborg =

Swedish writer

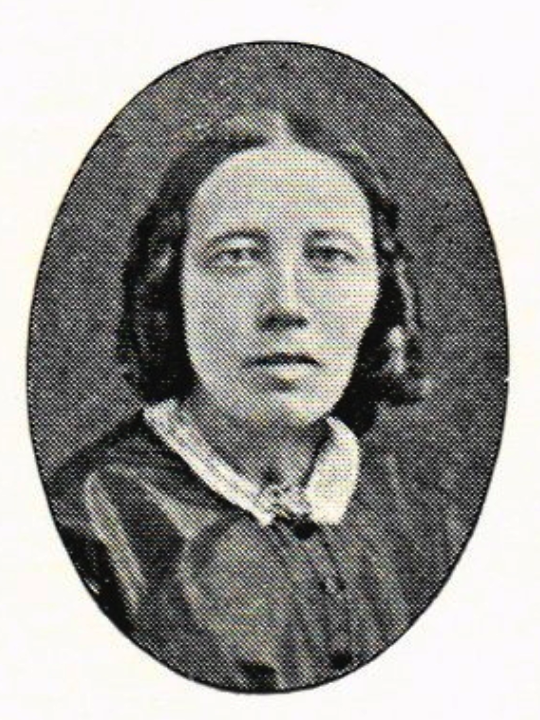
- Betty Ehrenborg in January 1860
- Born: 22 July 1818; Medelplana parish
- Died: 22 July 1880 (aged 62); Södertälje stadsförsamling
- Resting place: Norra begravningsplatsen
- Occupation: Writer, translator, teacher
- Spouse(s): Johan August Posse
- Parent(s): Casper Ehrenborg; Fredrica Ehrenborg
- Relatives: Ulla Bring, Anna Beata af Kleen, Richard Ehrenborg

Betty Ehrenborg, married name Posse af Säby (22 July 1818 – 22 July 1880), was a Swedish writer, psalm writer and pedagogue. She is regarded as the founder of the Swedish Sunday school.

== Life ==
Katarina Elisabeth Ehrenborg was the daughter of the noble Parliamentary Ombudsman Casper Ehrenborg and the writer Anna Fredrica Carlqvist. She was raised at the family estate Råbäck at Kinnekulle. Her sister Maria Ulrika (Ulla) Ehrenborg was the wife of Bishop Ebbe Gustaf Bring.

In 1842, she and her mother moved to Uppsala to be near her brother, Richard, who studied at Uppsala University. In Uppsala, she attended several of the university lectures, though she was merely a member of the civil audience and not a student, and she became a part of the Uppsala intellectual life of the 1840s.

She worked as a governess in 1846–1848. She got to know Swedish Baptist pioneer brothers Gustaf Palmquist and Per Palmqvist in 1851. Ehrenborg traveled to England around that time, possibly with the brothers, and learned about the Sunday school programs there. While in England she stayed with Mathilda Foy, who introduced her to Carl Olof Rosenius' teachings. In 1852–1853, she studied at the British and Foreign school in London. She remained in contact with the Palmqvist brothers and they encouraged her to publish "Andeliga sånger för barn och ungdom. Med melodier". After returning to Sweden, she established a Sunday school in 1854 with 13 mostly free-church and Baptist students. She founded and managed a Sunday school on her brother's estate in 1855–1856. Her Sunday school moved to Bethlehem Church in 1873.

In 1854, she co-founded the Fruntimmersällskapet för fångars förbättring in Stockholm with Foy, writer Fredrika Bremer, deaconess Maria Cederschiöld, and Emilia Elmblad, founder of the Stockholm home for reformed prostitutes.

In 1863, she married Baron Johan August Posse.

She died in Södertälje in 1880.

== Works ==
- "Twinkle, Twinkle, Little Star" (Swedish-language lyrics, "Blinka lilla stjärna")
- "Visan om solen, månen och planeterna" ("The song about the sun, moon and planets")
- "Wir hatten gebauet ein stattliches Haus" (Swedish-language lyrics: "När juldagsmorgon glimmar")

== Sources ==
- K Elisabet (Betty) Posse, urn:sbl:7371, Svenskt biografiskt lexikon (article by Oloph Bexell), retrieved 2015-09-04.
