= Ebbe Gustaf Bring =

Swedish bishop (1814–1884)

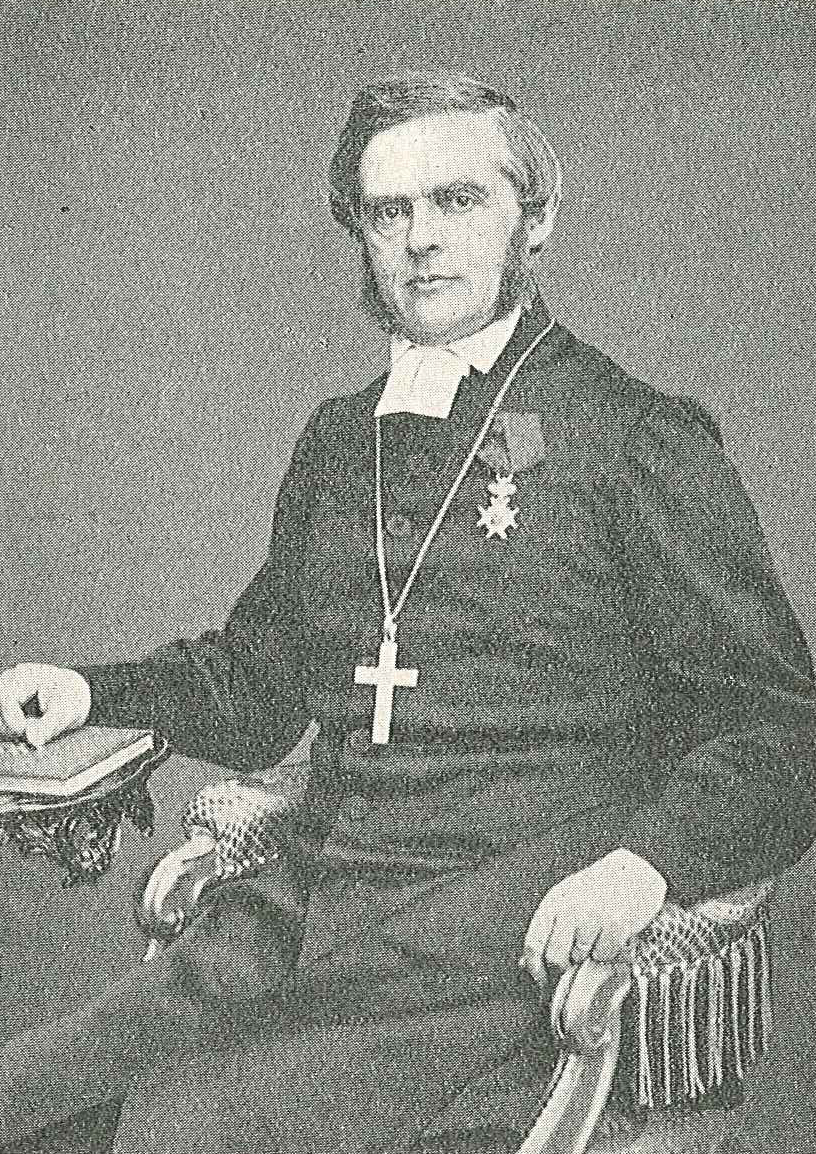
- Ebbe Gustaf Bring, sometime before 1884.
- Church: Church of Sweden
- Diocese: Diocese of Linköping
- In office: 1861–1884
- Predecessor: Johan Jacob Hedrén
- Successor: Carl Alfred Cornelius

Orders
- Ordination: 1837

Personal details
- Born: 4 July 1814; Askersund, Örebro County, Sweden
- Died: 13 August 1884 (aged 70); Linköping, Sweden
- Spouse: Maria Ulrika (Ulla) Ehrenborg (m. 1841)

Ebbe Gustaf Bring (4 July 1814 – 13 August 1884) was a Swedish bishop in the Church of Sweden and theologian.

== Biography ==
Bring was born in Askersund, Örebro County in 1814, to city physician and assessor Sven Håkan Bring and Ulrika (Ulla) Sofia Silfverswärd. He married Maria Ulrika (Ulla) Ehrenborg, sister of writer Betty Ehrenborg, in 1841. Bring was the father of lawyer Ernst Bring as well as grandfather of artist Maj Bring; he was also cousin of Ebbe Samuel Bring.

Bring enrolled at Uppsala University in 1829 and at Lund University in 1832, where he obtained a master's degree in philosophy in 1835. Bring was appointed docent in dogmatic theology and moral theology in 1837 and ordained the same year. In 1844 he was appointed adjunct theology professor and in the same year provost of his own parishes. From 1839 to 1847 he held various professorships in the Faculty of Theology almost continuously, and in 1848 he was appointed professor of pastoral theology and in 1856 also dean of Lund Cathedral. In 1861 he was appointed bishop of Linköping; in 1860 he received his doctorate in theology, and in 1870 he was elevated to the second rank on the proposal of archbishop. He had an interest in public education and higher education and was a member of Pro Fide et Christianismo, a Christian education society.

As a councillor for the Diocese of Lund, he was a member of the clergy in the 1853 and 1856 Riksdag of the Estates, where he was a member in his own right in 1862–1863 and 1865–1866. During the first of these assemblies he was a member of the clergy's individual committee (pastoral department), during the second and third of the Committee on Civil-Law Legislation and during the fourth of the Committee on the Constitution.

At the church synods of 1868, 1873 and 1883 he was vice-president, but at the General Synod of 1878 he had withdrawn from all positions of trust due to illness. Bring was also a member of several committees: for the preparation of proposals for new sermon texts (1850), for the revision of the agenda and catechism (1852), as well as for the preparation of a new catechism (1869 and 1875). He also supported the revision of the 1819 hymnal. Oscar II's three eldest sons were prepared by him for their first Communion. As bishop, he held clerical meetings in 1862, 1868, 1874 and 1882.

Bring was one of the most prominent defenders of the high church movement in Sweden. In political matters as well, he remained on the conservative side. Together with Hans Magnus Melin, Bring published Theologisk quartalskrift in 1841–1842 and, with Anton Niklas Sundberg and Wilhelm Flensburg, Swensk kyrkotidning in 1855–1863. These journals feature several of his contributions. Among his other writings may be mentioned Om det kyrkliga pericopsystemet (1851), Högmessopredikningar (1862) and Kyrkotukten enligt svenska kyrkans gällande ordning (1865). (See also Gottfrid Billing's "Ebbe Gustaf Bring, några minnesblad" (1886) and Gustaf Auléns "E.G. Bring såsom teolog" (1915).)

Bring died in Linköping in 1884 and is buried at Norra griftegården.
