= Fredrica Ehrenborg =

Swedish writer

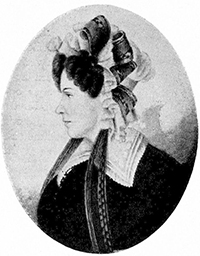
Anna Fredrika Ehrenborg

Anna Fredrica Ehrenborg, née Carlqvist (16 March 1794, Karlstad – 20 May 1873, Linköping), was a Swedish writer. She was regarded as one of the most notable supporters of The New Church in contemporary Sweden.

Anna Fredrika Carlqvist was orphaned at an early age and adopted by a burgher in Karlstad. She married the Parliamentary Ombudsman Casper Ehrenborg in 1811 and became the mother of the writer Betty Ehrenborg and Ulla Bring. She suffered from her lack of education, but educated herself by reading, and wished, and was able to pass on her knowledge. In 1824, she became a widow and had to support herself and her five children alone. At this point, she became interested in The New Church and the ideas of Swedenborg. She belonged to the Geijer literary circle in Uppsala and published several religious works, children stories, travel descriptions and other works. She was regarded as one of the leading supporters of The New Church in Sweden.
