= Tegnér church =

Type of church building in Sweden

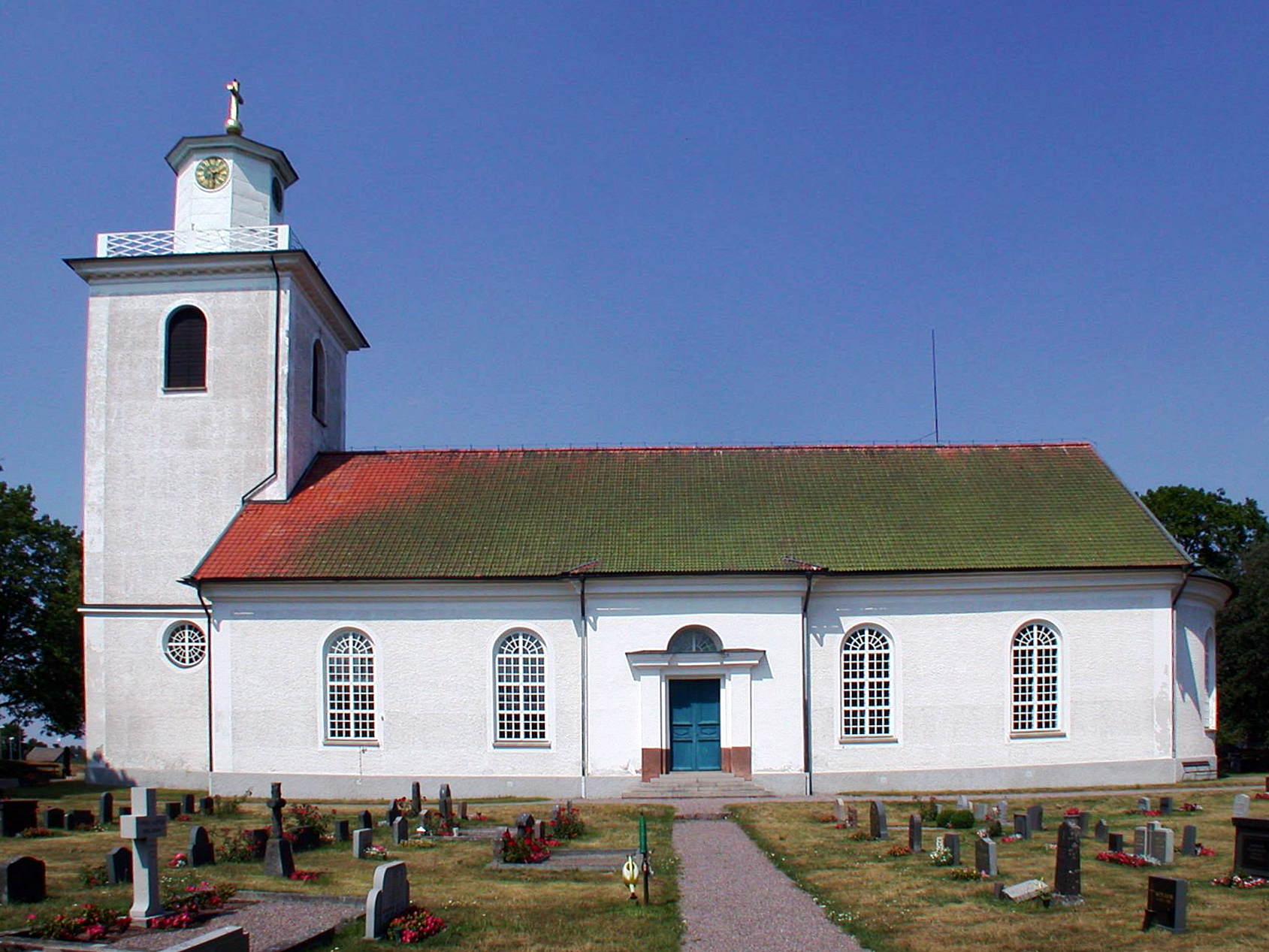
Bäckebo Church, inaugurated in 1847, is a Tegnér church.

A Tegnér church (Swedish: Tegnérkyrka) or Tegnér barn (Swedish: Tegnérlada) is a popular nickname given to church building, usually in rural Sweden built in the late 18th and early 19th century, when Esaias Tegnér was bishop of the Diocese of Växjö within the Church of Sweden. The term mostly became popular in Småland.

They are usually white, and built in Neoclassicist style, with a tall church tower, connected to the main building. Many of the church buildings were built replacing demolished Medieval church building. As the population of Sweden was increasing, the new churches were larger, able to house more people inside.
