= Svenska Sällskapet för Nykterhet och Folkbildning =

Swedish temperance organization

- Formation: 11 April 1837; 189 years ago
- Purpose: Temperance advocacy
- Location: Sweden
- Members: 150
- Secretary General: Farida al-Abani
- Formerly called: Svenska nykterhetssällskapet, Svenska Sällskapet för Nykterhet och Folkuppfostran

Svenska Sällskapet för Nykterhet och Folkbildning (English: Swedish Temperance and Public Education Society), previously Svenska nykterhetssällskapet until 1902 and Svenska Sällskapet för Nykterhet och Folkuppfostran until 2021, is an organization that promotes temperance and ethical education based on Christian principles. During the 1840s and 1850s, the organization was the center of the temperance movement in Sweden and had up to 100,000 members.

== Founding ==
The society was founded on 11 April 1837 by Bengt Franc-Sparre, August von Hartmansdorff, Jöns Jacob Berzelius, Anders Retzius, Samuel Owen, George Scott, and others. The society gathered together the various newly formed temperance societies, including Owen and Scott's organization, Kungsholmen Nykterhetsförening, founded in 1832. The purpose of the organization was "to illustrate by printed matter and other useful means the harmfulness of the use of brännvin and other distilled spirits and to call attention to the importance of their elimination". Berzelius was the society's first chairman.

It was modeled on the British and Foreign Temperance Society (founded in 1831) and the corresponding American Temperance Society (1826). The ideas were brought to Sweden primarily by Robert Baird, an American Presbyterian preacher who made several lecture tours in Europe and spread knowledge on the issue of temperance.

King Charles XIV John, who was concerned about the high consumption of alcohol in Sweden, supported the society by approving the bylaws on 5 May of the same year, barely a month after its founding. In the light of the Conventicle Act, which prohibited private religious gatherings in the home, this approval was very significant. The society immediately contacted leading churchmen, such as Per Adolf Sondén, Daniel Ehrenfried Gravallius, Carl Fredrik af Wingård, Carl Adolph Agardh, Frans Michael Franzén, and Johan Henrik Thomander, and could easily counter accusations that the organization was connected with Methodism, unlawful in Sweden at the time due to the Conventicle Act. The support of the king and the clergy contributed to the society's rapid success. A month after its founding, there were 56 affiliated local temperance societies representing some 10,000 members, and by the mid-1840s, membership had grown to over 100,000 members from all segments of society. Members included K. O. Broady, a Swedish Baptist missionary and military colonel; and Thor Hartwig Odencrants, member of the courts (vicehäradshövding).

== Activity ==
The society published and distributed a large number of publications, organized large sobriety meetings and sent out prominent traveling speakers, such as Peter Wieselgren, Peter Fjellstedt, Lars Paul Esbjörn, Per August Ahlberg, Erik Andreas Rosenius, and others. In the aftermath of the French Revolution of 1848, the organization faced challenges and was inactive for several years. During this time, political work on alcohol was carried out by agricultural societies (hushållningssällskap), local temperance societies and, not least, physician Magnus Huss, who introduced the term alcoholism in 1849.

At the time, the organization believed that education and information were sufficient to reduce alcohol consumption and did not advocate a reduction in availability. However, its advocacy was instrumental in the passing of the 1855 temperance laws, which abolished legal home distilling (husbehovsbränning).

After Peter Wieselgren's death in 1877, the organization was faced with a choice. Its chairman Henning Hamilton argued that it had no choice but to close down, mainly for financial reasons, while Carl Oscar Berg, Oscar Ekman and Sigfrid Wieselgren, Wieselgren's son, argued that it should continue to operate. Ekman's injection of funds gave the work a new boost. In 1880, a large temperance meeting was called in Jönköping to work against the 1878 liquor committee, which advocated a far-reaching liberalization of the legislation. The Jönköping meeting succeeded in uniting moderate and radical temperance supporters in a joint statement, and also gained the support of the country's municipal councils and church councils, 99% of which rejected the new proposal. The responses were submitted to the king and Riksdag, and thanks to the skillful lobbying, the 1855 temperance legislation was saved. The work of Sigfried Wieselgren, the organization's "undisputed tactician", "great ideologist", and leading figure of the Nya Centern party, particularly played a large role.

== Activity in the 20th century ==
During the 1890s, the International Organisation of Good Templars gained ground and quickly became the leading temperance organization in the country. On the initiative of Sigfrid Wieselgren, the society was reformed in 1902 and given its present name. Membership was limited to 50, but there was the option of adding corresponding members. Book publishing continued (over two million copies were distributed over the years) and several new branches of activity were started. Traveling libraries were set up, lectures continued to be organized, and school cooking activities were carried out in rural areas. The society was also responsible for providing an opinion on applications for government grants from other temperance organizations.

== Today ==
In 1980, the society was reformed again under the leadership of Gösta Vestlund and the fifty-member limit was removed. As of 2022, the society has about 150 members and holds meetings on current issues several times a year. It also runs the think tank Nocturum, which works on new perspectives on the issue of alcohol.

Farida al-Abani has been its secretary general since 2020.

== See also ==
- IOGT-NTO – Swedish temperance organization
