= Berzeliusdalen =

Valley of Spitsbergen, Norway

Coordinates: 77.8578°N 14.7957°E

Berzeliusdalen is a valley in Nordenskiöld Land at Spitsbergen, Svalbard. It has a length of about 16 kilometers, stretching from the mountain pass Skardalspasset down to the northern side of Van Mijenfjorden. The valley is named after Swedish chemist Jöns Jacob Berzelius. The river Berzeliuselva flows through the valley.

== See also ==
- Berzeliustinden
