= Andrine Winther =

Swedish politician (born 1977)

- Winther in October 2016

Member of the Riksdag
- Incumbent
- Assumed office 28 September 2026
- Constituency: Stockholm County

Personal details
- Born: 27 February 1977 (age 49) Vara, Sweden
- Party: Social Democratic Party

Andrine Astrid Cecilia Winther (born 27 February 1977) is a Swedish politician and Member of the Riksdag. A member of the Social Democratic Party, she has represented Stockholm County since September 2026.

Winther was born on 27 February 1977 in Vara. She has a Bachelor of Science degree in political sciences. She was a departmental head at the Social Democratic Party parliamentary group's secretariat and the party's international secretary. She was policy advisor to Prime Minister Stefan Löfven and a vice-chair of the Olof Palme International Center. She was chair of the IOGT-NTO's board and a board member of the Swedish Temperance Youth Association (UNF).

Winther was a member of the municipal council in Värmdög. She was elected to the Riksdag at the 2026 general election.
