= Thor Hartwig Odencrants =

Swedish politician (1817–1886)

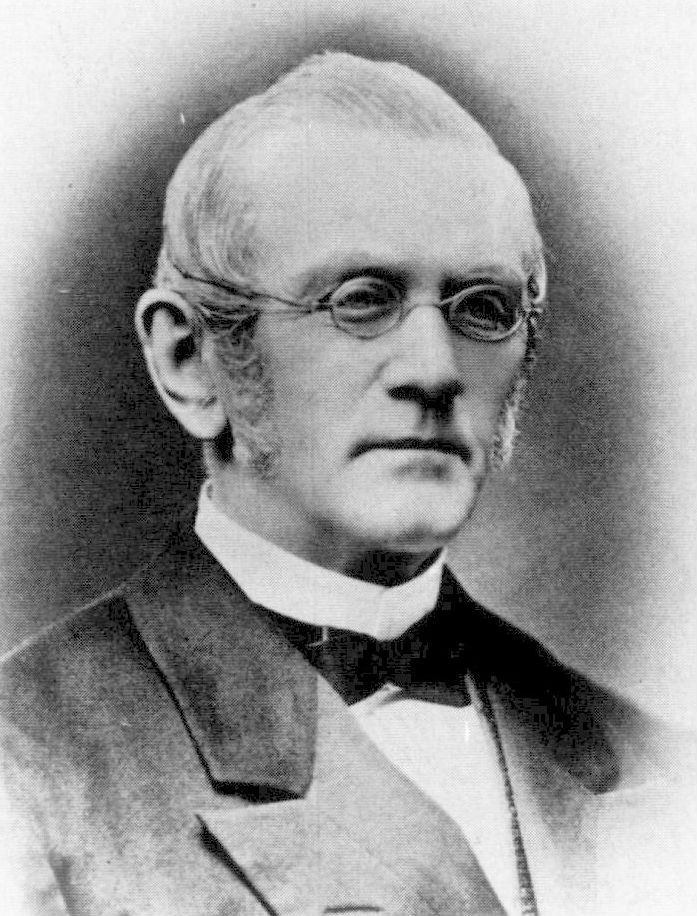
- Born: 26 February 1817; Ljungarum parish, Jönköping County, Sweden
- Died: 2 February 1886 (aged 68); Ljungarum parish, Jönköping County, Sweden
- Burial place: Ljungarum Cemetery
- Occupations: Politician, jurist
- Political party: None
- Spouse: Jacquette Gyllenhaal (m. 1845)
- Children: Thor Herman Odencrants; Henning Odencrantz

Thor Hartwig Odencrants (called Odencrantz i Torpa in the Riksdag; 26 February 1817 – 2 February 1886) was a Swedish jurist and member of Parliament.

Odencrants was born in Torpa, Ljungarum, Jönköping County. He was a clerk for the court of appeal and vicehäradshövding, was a member of the estate of the knighthood and nobility at the 1844–1845 Riksdag of the Estates. After the representational reform, he was later a member of the Riksdag in the upper chamber (Första kammaren) from 1873 to 1875 for Jönköping County. Odencrants was chairman of the Jönköping Mission Society, and worked for the founding of the Swedish Evangelical Mission. He was also chairman of the board of Hall's printing house in Jönköping. From 1858 he was a mentor to the poet Lina Sandell.

From 1836, Odencrants was active in the intra-church revival, which originated with the priest Per Magnus Elmblad. He was linked to other key figures in the revival, including priest Peter Wieselgren and Peter Fjellstedt. When the leadership of the movement was taken over by C. M. Rahmn, Odencrants began to spend a lot of time in Rahmn's home, where missionary prayers were often held. Odencrants eventually acted as cantor when the gatherings moved to the auditorium of the Jönköping preparatory school. Together with Rahmn, he formed the Jönköping Tract Society.

Odencrants was the son of Thor August Odencrants, a member of the court of appeal. He was married to Margareta Sophia Lovisa Jacobina (Jacquette) Gyllenhaal and was the father of vicehäradshövding Thor Herman Odencrants and court of appeal assessor Henning Odencrants.

He died in 1886 in Ljungarum and was buried in Ljungarum Cemetery.
