= Swedish temperance societies =

Temperance societies in Sweden

Swedish temperance societies are of a wide variety.

In 1933 these included:

- IOGT-NTO (the Swedish branch of IOGT International)
- Nykterhetsorden Verdandi (NOV, socialist, established 1896)
- Öfverås Blåbandsförening, founded by Beatrice Dickson in 1884
- Sveriges Blåbandsförbund (SBF, Christian, the blue ribbon association, established in Sweden in 1883)
- Vita Bandet (for women, the white ribbon, established in Sweden in 1900)
- Motorförararnas Helnykterhetsförbund (MHF, for motorists, founded 1926)
- Sveriges Lärares Nykterhetsförbund (SLN, for teachers, founded 1906)
- Sveriges Studerande Ungdoms Helnykterhetsförbund (SSUH, for students)
- Järnvägsmännens Helnykterhetsförbund (JHF, for railroad workers)
- Sveriges Polismäns Helnykterhetsförbund (SPHF, for policemen, founded 1905)
- Svenska Tullpersonalens Helnykterhetsförbund (STHF, for customs staff)
- Svenska Läkarnas Nykterhetsförening (for physicians).

Sweden's first central temperance society was Svenska Sällskapet för Nykterhet och Folkuppfostran, established on April 11, 1837. It still existed in 1933, but only had 149 members. Peter Wieselgren had formed an earlier society for high school students in Växjö.

== See also ==
- Temperance movement
- List of Temperance organizations
