= Andrine =

Andrine is a given name, a feminine derivative of Andrew. Notable people with the given name include:

- Andrine Benjaminsen (born 1995), Norwegian orienteer and ski orienteer
- Andrine Christensen (1814–1853), Norwegian actress and dancer
- Andrine Flemmen (born 1974), Norwegian alpine skier
- Andrine Hegerberg (born 1993), Norwegian footballer
- Andrine Sæther (born 1964), Norwegian actress
- Andrine Tomter (born 1995), Norwegian footballer
- Andrine Winther (born 1977), Swedish politician
