= Emilie Petersen =

Emilie Charlotta Petersen (née Eckert; 15 July 1780 in Hamburg – 10 January 1859 in Kärda), known as Mormor på Herrestad (The Herrestad Grandmother), was a Swedish landowner and philanthropist. She was a pioneer within the sewing society in Sweden, as well as an internationally known philanthropist.

== Life ==
Emilie Petersen was the daughter of the councilor Christian Eckert and married the wealthy merchant Johan Philip Petersen in 1800 in Hamburg. The couple emigrated to Sweden when Hamburg was taken by Napoleon in 1806, and in 1813, they bought the manor Herrestad.

Petersen supported the Swedish Missionary Society from 1835, and from 1838, she regularly arranged religious sewing meetings, which are regarded to have introduced the sewing society in Sweden.

During the famines in the 1830s when the crops failed, Petersen arranged, in collaboration with the authorities, the Fruntimmersföreningen i Kärda ('Kärda Women's Society'), a society that provided work for poor women within the parish with her estate in the center of the organization. The principle of the society was economic funds given to the poor upon religious humanitarian grounds in exchange for a workforce. The society gradually expanded to surrounding parishes: it became famous and received economic support both nationally and internationally.

She also held an orphanage for poor orphans, which gave her the name Mormor på Herrestad (The Herrestad Grandmother).

Petersen had a number of visitors, including revivalists Carl Olof Rosenius, Mathilda Foy, and Amelie von Braun. She was also the godmother to missionary Peter Fjellstedt's son, Joel.
