= Gustaf Ljunggren (academician) =

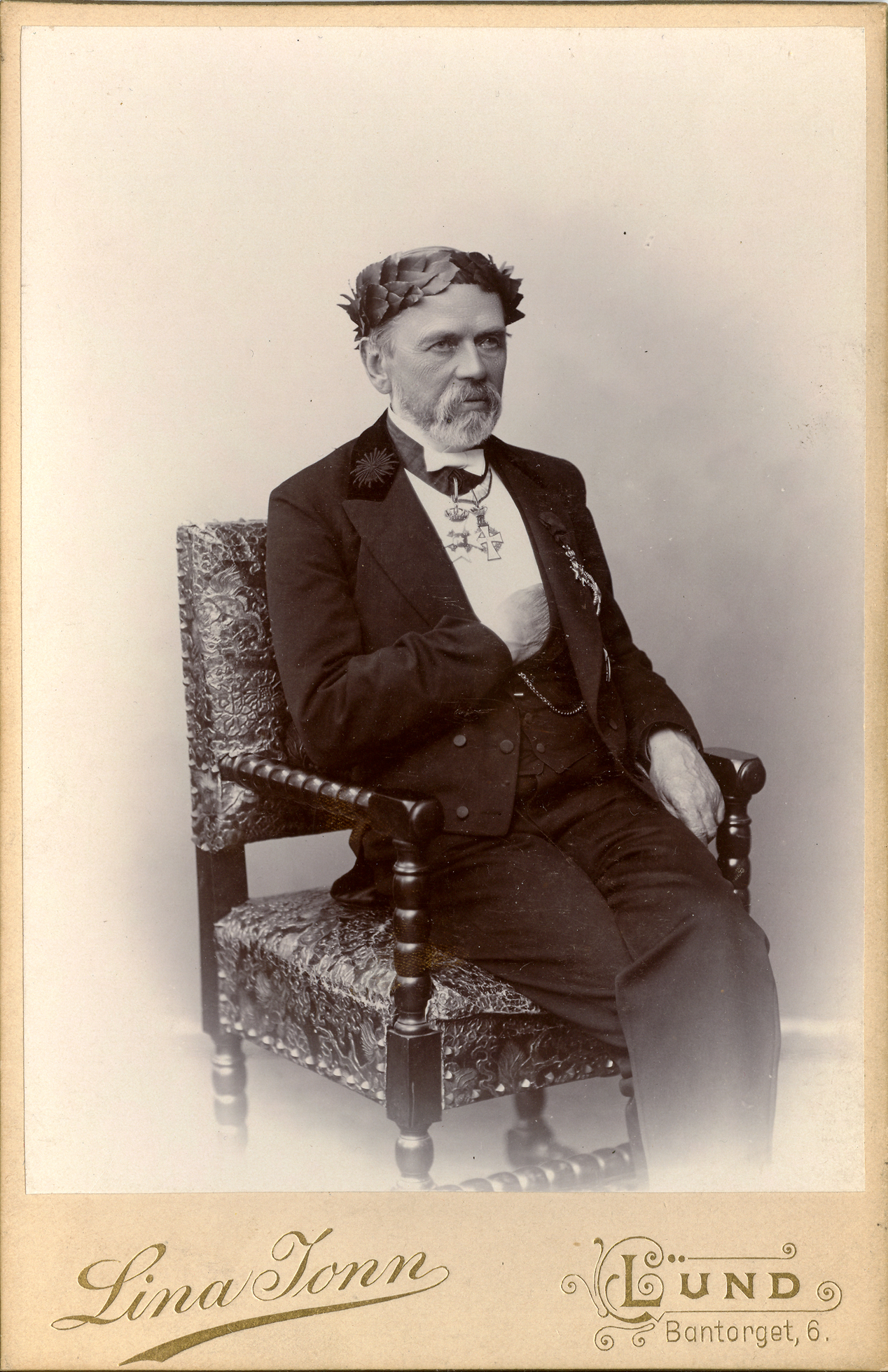
Gustaf Ljunggren

Gustaf Håkan Jordan Ljunggren (6 March 1823 – 13 August 1905), Swedish man of letters, was born at Lund, the son of a clergyman. He was educated at Lund University, where he was professor of German (1850–1859), of aesthetics (1859–1889) and rector (1875–1885). He had been a member of the Swedish Academy for twenty years at the time of his death in 1905.

His most important work, Svenska vitterhetens häfder från Gustaf III:s död (5 vols., Lund., 1873–1895), is a comprehensive study of Swedish literature in the 19th century. His other works include: Framställning af de fornämsta esthetiska systemerna ("An exposition of the principal system of aesthetics"; 2 vols., 1856–1860); Svenska dramat until slutet af sjuttonde århundradet ("a history of the Swedish drama down to the end of the 17th century", Lund, 1864); Bellman och Fredmans epistlar: en studie (1864), and a history of the Swedish Academy in the year of its centenary (1886).

His scattered writings were collected as Smärre skrifter (3 vols., 1872–1881).

He was elected a member of the Royal Swedish Academy of Sciences in 1881.

== Notes ==
Cultural offices
| Preceded by Johan Henrik Thomander | Swedish Academy, Seat No.18; 1865-1905 | Succeeded by Vitalis Norström |
