= Berzeliustinden =

Mountain in Spitsbergen, Norway

Coordinates: 77.5108°N 15.0388°E

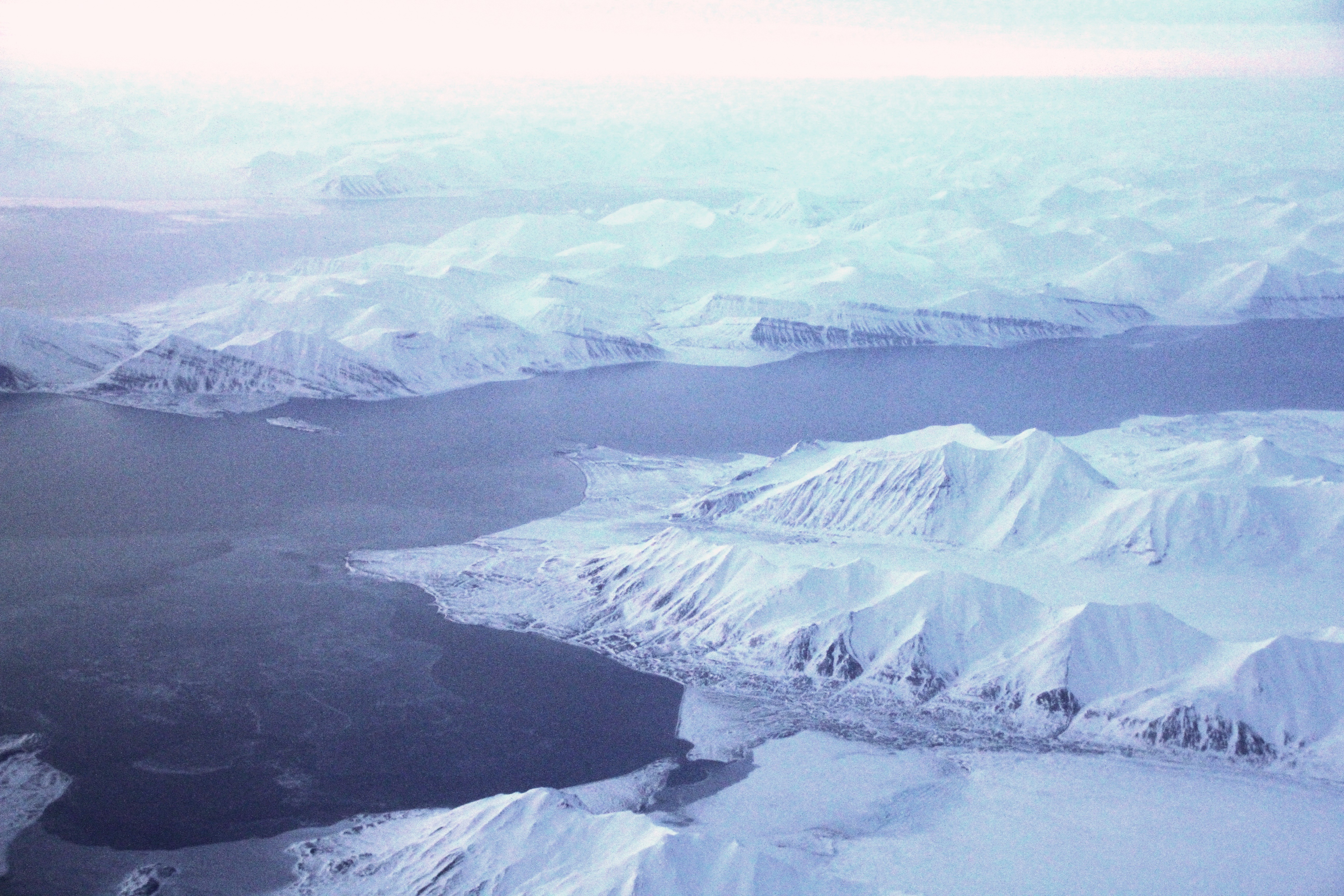
Widely Jarlsberg Land image.JPG

Berzeliustinden is a mountain in Wedel Jarlsberg Land in Spitsbergen, Svalbard. It has a height of 1,211 m.a.s.l. It is located south of Van Keulenfjorden, and is included in the Sør-Spitsbergen National Park.

The mountain is named after Swedish chemist Jöns Jacob Berzelius.

== See also ==
- Berzeliusdalen
