= Amelie von Braun =

Swedish educator and preacher

Amelie Fredrika Dorothea von Braun
- Born: 14 October 1811
- Died: 30 March 1859 (aged 47)
- Burial place: Carl Gustaf's cemetery in Karlshamn
- Occupations: Educator, preacher
- Known for: First Swedish Sunday school

Amelie Fredrika Dorothea von Braun (14 October 1811 – 30 March 1859) was a Swedish educator and Christian preacher. She is known to have introduced the Sunday school in Sweden from an English role model in the 1850s.

== Biography ==
Amelie von Braun was born to Major Christian von Braun (1780–1863) and Justina Katarina von Braun. Her father had previously served in the war as a major with a lieutenant colonel's discharge. She had three sisters and two brothers, including author Wilhelm von Braun. She never married but lived with her parents even as an adult, as was customary for an unmarried woman of her social class at the time. Her family lived on limited means but belonged to the poor genteel middle class. She moved with her parents to Gotland in 1827 and from there to Karlshamn in 1843, where her father was a postmaster. She was given a modest home schooling suitable for a middle class lady with limited means because her family could only afford to pay for her brothers' education.

On an unclear date after 1848 but before 1856, she founded the first Sunday school in Sweden in Karlshamn. Her students gathered by a well outside the town, which has since been referred to as "Frökens källa" ("the Well of the unmarried lady"). Her Sunday school work was supported by missionary and preacher Peter Fjellstedt and grew quickly, with 250 students noted in 1853.

She was known to have visited Emilie Petersen, known as Mormor på Herrestad ('the Herrestad Grandmother'), a philanthropist.

After her mother's death in 1855, Amelie von Braun began to engage in public preaching. She could preach for several hours and had hundreds gather to listen. Her religious preaching had to take place elsewhere than in the church room because she was a laywoman. Her main aim was to counteract the separatism she thought she saw and to preach fidelity to the doctrine of the Swedish state church. She travelled around southern and central Sweden to evangelise, spreading the idea of regular Sunday school with Christian instruction for children. Here she became an influential pioneer. Her book Christendomslifvet i vår tid ('Christendom in our time') was published posthumously in 1860 and was widely distributed.

She is buried in Carl Gustaf's cemetery in Karlshamn.
