= Anders Retzius =

Swedish professor of anatomy

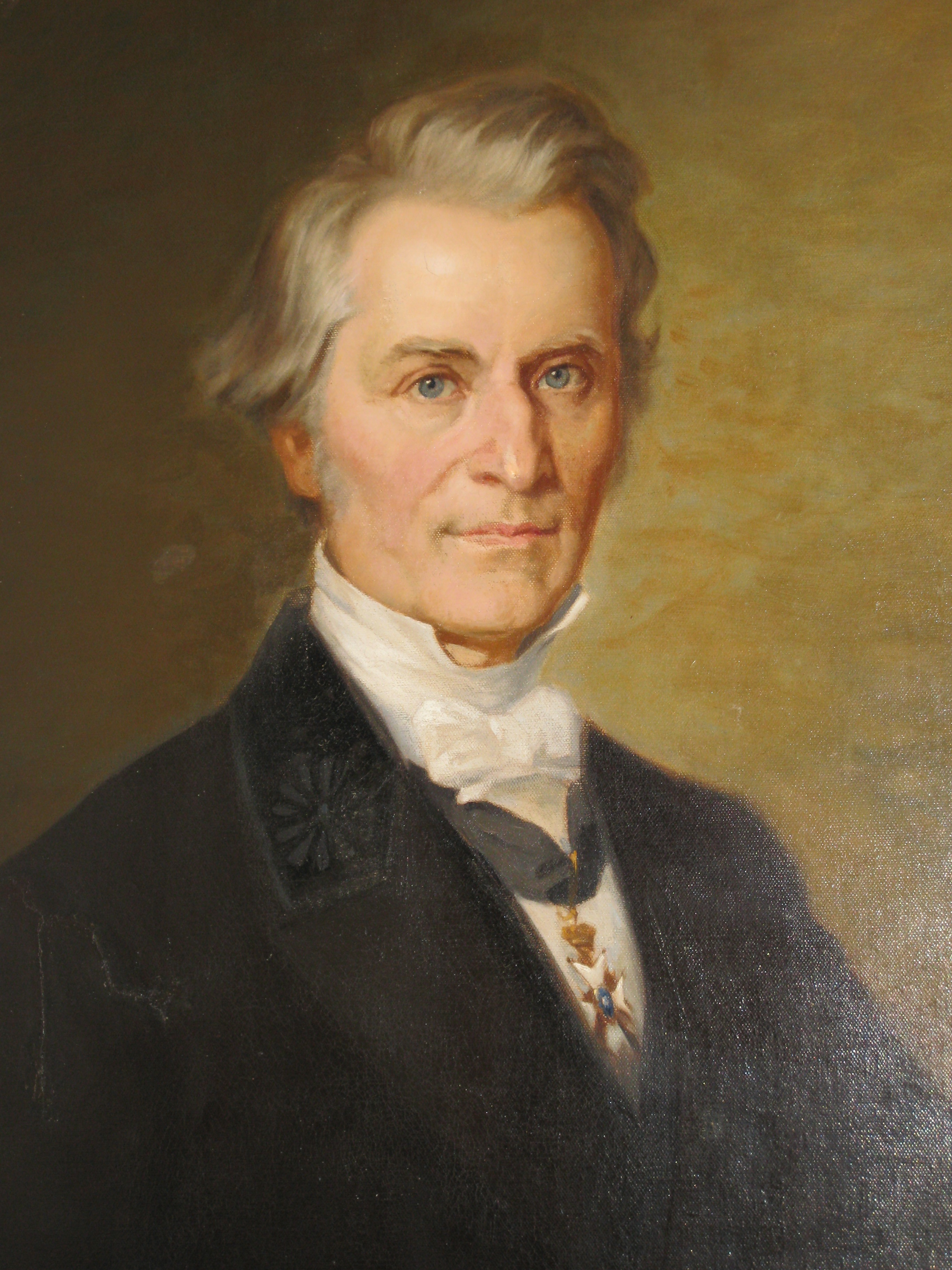
Anders Retzius, by Jean Haagen (copy of an original by an unknown artist)

Anders Adolph Retzius (13 October 1796 – 18 April 1860), was a Swedish professor of anatomy and a supervisor at the Karolinska Institute in Stockholm.

== Biography ==
Retzius was born in Lund to Anders Jahan Retzius and Ulrika Beata Prytz in 1796. His brother was the doctor Magnus Kristian Retzius. He enrolled at Lund University in 1812 where he studied medicine, and alternated with studies in Copenhagen, until he in 1818 became a licensed doctor of medicine. Through his friendship with Jöns Jakob Berzelius, as early as 1824 he was appointed temporary professor of anatomy at the Karolinska Institute, an institute to which he dedicated much of his strength for many years. In 1830 he was also appointed temporary supervisor there, and in 1840 he was appointed both permanent professor and supervisor. Pathologist Axel Key was one of his students.

During the next decades he made many anatomical discoveries, for instance about the finer parts of the teeth, of the skull, of the muscles and of the nervous system. He was also an anthropologist, whose studies of the human cranium led to the classifications dolichocephalic and brachycephalic. He was considered to be very knowledgeable and was elected into many of the scientific academies at the time. He is credited with defining the cephalic index, which is the ratio of width to length of one's head.

Retzius was a polygenist. Retzius studied many different skull types from different races; because the skulls were so different from each race, he believed that the races had a separate origin.

The retropubic space of Retzius is named after him. The peritoneum lies deep to the posterior layer of transversalis fascia and is very adherent to it. Distally, this close contact remains in the area lateral to the epigastrics. Medially, however, the peritoneum reflects on the roof of the bladder and runs sharply dorsally, away from the deep layer of transversalis fascia. The separation of transversalis fascia and peritoneum contains loose fatty tissue allowing for the filling of the bladder. This space is called the retropubic space of Retzius (from the Clinic of Digestive Surgery, University Hospital St-Pierre, Brussels).

Retzius was active in the temperance movement, engaging himself in the battle against the Swedish drinking habits – which at this time had a significant impact on Swedish society – with works on the harmful effects liquor has on the body. Along with Bengt Franc-Sparre, August von Hartmansdorff, Jöns Jacob Berzelius, Samuel Owen, George Scott, and others, he was one of the founders of Svenska Nykterhetssällskapet, the Swedish Temperance Society, in 1837.

In 1826, he was elected a member of the Royal Swedish Academy of Sciences.

The Swedish Society for Anthropology and Geography previously awarded the Anders Retzius Medal in Gold to world-leading scholars in human geography and anthropology. In 2015, the Society decided that it was inappropriate to award a medal in Retzius's name considering his contributions to phrenology.

He was the father of Gustaf Retzius.

Retzius died in Stockholm in 1860.

== See also ==
- Striae of Retzius
