= Johan Henrik Thomander =

Swedish bishop and professor (1798–1865)

- Bishop
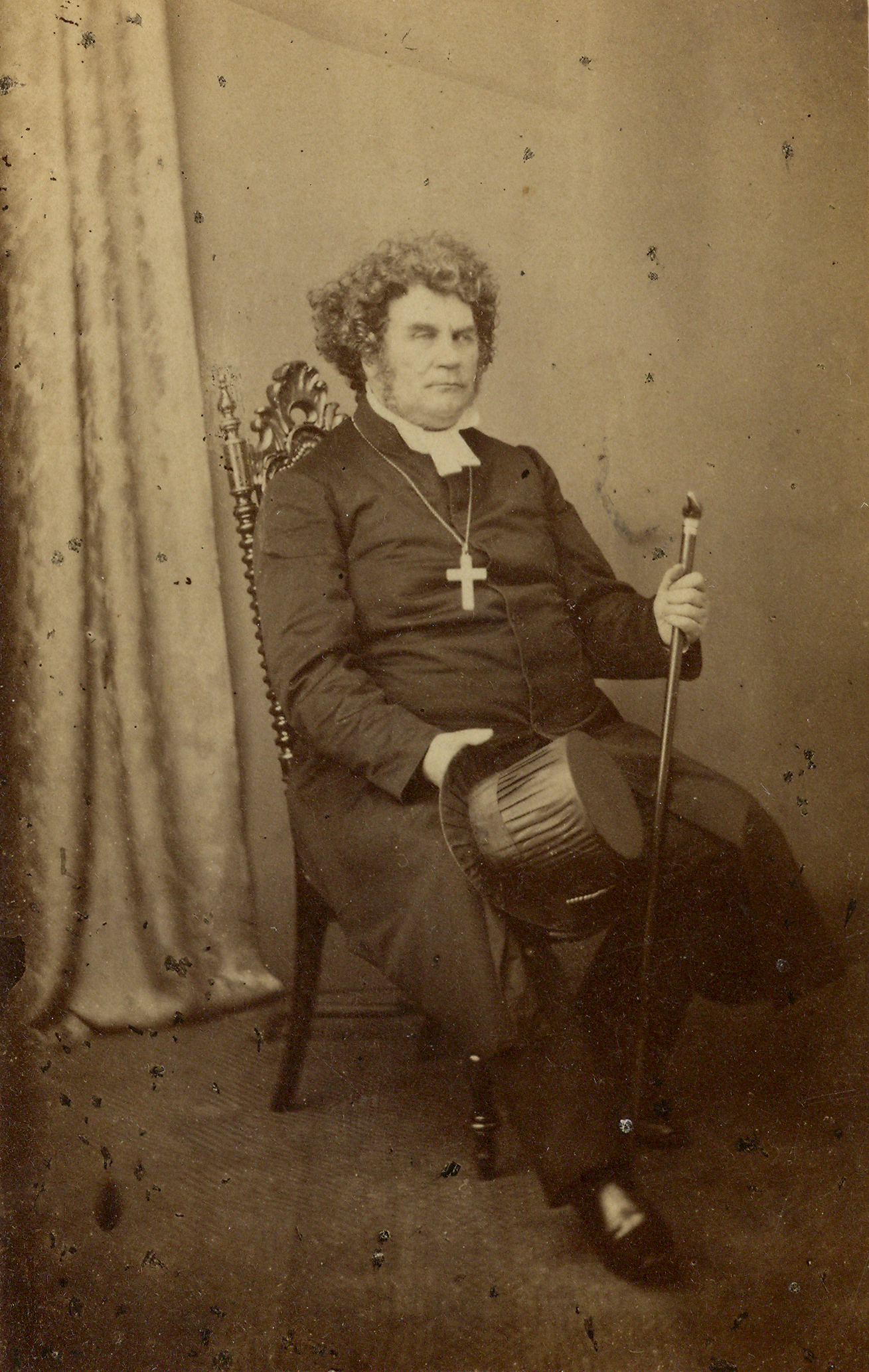
- Church: Church of Sweden
- Diocese: Diocese of Lund
- In office: 1856–1865
- Predecessor: Henrik Reuterdahl
- Successor: Wilhelm Flensburg

Orders
- Ordination: 1821

Personal details
- Born: 16 June 1798 Fjälkinge, Kristianstad County, Sweden
- Died: 9 July 1865 (aged 67) Lund, Sweden
- Spouse: Emilia Katarina Meyer (m. 1834)

Johan Henrik Thomander (16 June 1798 – 9 July 1865) was a Swedish professor, bishop, translator and author. He received his doctorate in theology in 1836 and was elected to the eighteenth chair of the Swedish Academy in 1856.

After his father's death, Thomander's daughters bequeathed a house on Sandgatan in Lund to Lund University to be used as a student residence. The dormitory still exists today and is called Johan Henrik Thomanders studenthem ('Johan Henrik Thomander's dormitory').

== Upbringing and early career ==
Johan Henrik Thomander was born in Fjälkinge, Kristianstad County, in 1798, the illegitimate son of vice pastor Albrecht Johan Pisarski and Maria Sophia Thomaeus (1776–1851). His parents met when his father was serving at his maternal grandfather, Thomas Thomander's, parish in Fjälkinge. The mother's family, also spelled Thomé and Thomée and related to the nobility Adelsköld, descended, according to tradition, from a Scottish nobleman who was stranded at Torekov around 1615 and was later admitted as a master mason in Helsingborg, and called himself Hans. Johan Henrik Thomander was the nephew of the writer, hymnwriter and priest Jöran Jakob Thomæus. His mother later married printing works supervisor Thomas Bond. His father's parents were Johan Pisarsky and Brita Sara Frumerie.

Born to unmarried parents, Thomander grew up with his grandmother, Elsa Sophia Mandorff. He began studying at Lund University in 1812, only to be forced to interrupt his studies in 1814 and take a job as a private tutor for a merchant family in Karlshamn. However, he studied in his spare time, passed his exams and was ordained a priest in 1821. First appointed as a preacher at Karlshamn Fortress, Thomander was appointed docent at the theological seminary in Lund in 1826, became adjunct assistant priest in 1831, was passed over for the position of dean in 1831, but became professor of pastoral theology in 1833 and was awarded a doctorate in theology at Copenhagen University in 1836.

== Further in his career ==
He became professor of dogmatics and moral theology in 1845, 2nd professor of theology in 1847, and in 1850 dean of Gothenburg, which position he assumed in 1851. In 1856 he succeeded Henrik Reuterdahl as bishop of the diocese of Lund. In 1840 he entered political life as a member of the clergy in the Riksdag of the Estates, and in 1855 he was elected after Per Daniel Amadeus Atterbom to the Swedish Academy, which in 1849 awarded him its great prize for rhetoric on the occasion of his collection of sermons published the same year.

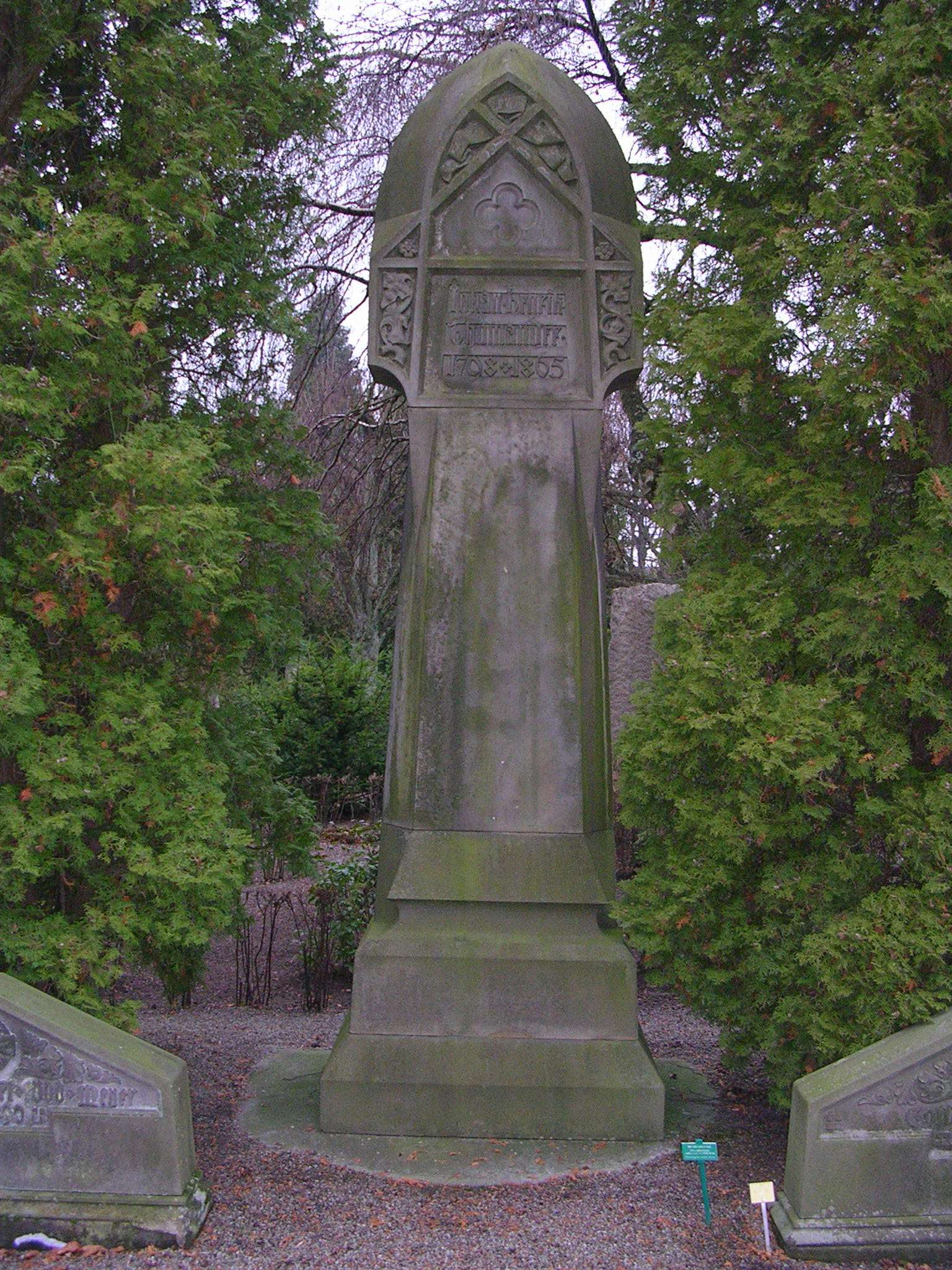
Thomander's grave at Östra kyrkogården in Lund.

Thomander was a man of genius and highly versatile. When he applied for the post of dean in Lund in 1830, Carl Adolph Agardh, comparing him with Reuterdahl, gave the following opinion:

"Thomander is a far superior person, superior by his healthy nature, his able body, his lively manners, his warmth, his wit, his knowledge of modern literature, his ability to come forward when necessary, his intrepidity, his boldness, his aplomb, his way of making himself important and everyone else a trifle. He is capable of everything, of being a courtier, a poet, a statesman, a writer, a translator, a critic, a lawyer, a priest, a professor, why not a dean?"

Agardh's simultaneously flattering and reproachful characterization of Thomander was formed during the battle for the position of dean in Lund. It was certainly fair that Thomander did not obtain this position, which he sought along with some older, well qualified men. Thomander had the dubious merit of making this dispute infamous. Through his work Antivandalskrift, directed especially against his co-applicant Achatius Kahl, and in the journal Gefion, which he published together with Nils Otto Ahnfelt, he had ample opportunity to demonstrate his superior ability as a polemicist and satirist. This ability never left him. But with age it mellowed and lost something of the irreverence of youth. In earlier years he gave it free rein. It is characteristically encountered in his correspondence with K. F. Dahlgren. These letters also provide a good insight into Thomander's wide-ranging literary interests. During his time in the army he acquired a rare erudition, not least in recent European literature. In his younger years, aesthetic interests seem to have dominated. A professorship in aesthetics then seemed the dream of the future.

== Literary output ==
His literary output at this time also took an aesthetic turn. It was then that he gave brilliant proof of his outstanding talent for translation. Thus in 1825 appeared Shakespeare's The Merry Wives of Windsor, As You Like It, Twelfth Night, Antony and Cleopatra, and Richard II, interpretations which were also endorsed by Carl August Hagberg as excellent, and also The Clouds by Aristophanes in 1826, Manfred by Lord Byron, and Brutus by Voltaire in 1830. In manuscript, too, he produced at the same time several such works, as Amanda by Moreto (performed in 1831), Shakespeare's Macbeth, Le Tardif by Gensoul, and Thesmophoriazusae and The Frogs by Aristophanes, the last three first printed in his Skrifter.

== Theological works ==
He began his theological writing with the treatise De antichristo primae ecclesiae (1826). Together with Henrik Reuterdahl, he published Theologisk quartalskrift ('Theological Quarterly') from 1828 to 1832 and 1836 to 1840, which forms an epoch in the history of Swedish theology. Among Thomander's contributions is his review of Sweden's recent homiletical literature, a collection of reviews which retains its value to this day. Remarkable here is the high esteem in which he held Henric Schartau, who otherwise had no great name in the educated and literary world. In 1835 Thomander published a translation of the New Testament (new edition 1860). The intention was to break with the principles of the Bible Commission of the time. However, Thomander's attempt did not succeed.

== Thomander's environment ==
As a lecturer, Thomander was not very prominent, nor did he enjoy any particular popularity among students. However, he was one of the initiators of the formation of the Academic Society at Lund University and became its first president. He was also the university's rector in 1838–1839. Thomander was conservative in his religious and theological views and was equated by Esaias Tegnér with the orthodox Bergquist, disciple of Schartau. In church politics, however, he was liberal. It was also in the field of church politics that Thomander was to intervene most actively. He was devoted to public life; his talent also led him there. Thomander embraced the temperance movement, which began in the 1830s, with great warmth. With great talent he defended the form of association against its detractors, in particular his colleague Reuterdahl. The temperance issue became a wedge between former dissenters. Two parties began to form: on one side Thomander, Peter Wieselgren, Paul Gabriel Ahnfelt, and later Hans Birger Hammar; on the other Reuterdahl and the majority of the clergy, a group which later was strengthened by the specifically Lundensian high church under the leadership of Ebbe Gustaf Bring.

== Reform ==
The conviction of the necessity of timely reforms in the area of church order and the self-confident awareness of his own abilities led Thomander to apply for membership in the canon law committee, which in the 1830s was being reorganized, since the canon law proposal published in 1828 had apparently proved impossible to adopt. Then Secretary of State August von Hartmansdorff did not reject the offer. When the committee was reorganized at the end of 1833, Thomander became one of the new members. He demonstrated his eminent abilities in the field by publishing a draft canon law a few years later, which he himself had written and which later became the basis for much of the committee's further work. Its final proposal could not, any more than the previous one, stand the fire of criticism, but some questions were nevertheless solved in the way of partial reforms, and some were carried forward towards their solution.

In church politics, Thomander was opposed to clerical episcopal polity and joined the ranks of those who desired greater freedom within the church and more room for the members of the congregation to decide the affairs of the church. He also wanted greater freedom of movement for the church against the state, and as a supporter of synodal constitutional principles, he pushed for the institution of the church council to be included in the 1846 church constitution. Thomander's great importance in church politics was linked to the important political role he played in the parliamentary life of the 1840s. There he was decidedly on the liberal side and interacted lively with the liberal leaders. Thomander's masterly speech at the House of Nobility in 1840, at a joint meeting of all four estates on the question of representation, already established him as one of the country's leading parliamentary orators. He was a constant advocate for change in representation and personally intervened to advance the issue; it was Thomander who drafted the so-called Ekholm proposal in 1845.

== Interest in public education ==
Thomander was greatly interested in issues of public education. He spoke in favor of appropriations for the education system at four parliamentary sessions (1840–1841, 1844–1845, 1847–1848 and 1856–1858) of the six Thomander proved he was a member of the State Committee. In the 1850s Thomander devoted less time to purely political life, having such a significant influence on the development of the church. The decade was a particularly difficult period of transition, brought about by the large revivalist movements and the triumph of liberalism, in which the revivalists found political support for their demands for the removal of all barriers in the religious sphere. Thomander was as firmly opposed to the policy of non possumus as he was to radical subversion. He set out his position in a paper entitled Om svenska kyrkans och skolans angelägenheter ('On the affairs of the Swedish church and school') (1853), directed against a similarly titled paper by Reuterdahl.

== Impact ==
In De kyrkliga frågorna ('The Ecclesiastical Questions') (1860), he looks back at what the decade had brought in the way of reform, and it was no small amount. Kyrkoplikt, a form of punishment in which the condemned had to confess and repent publicly in church, had been abolished; the Conventicle Act outlawing religious gatherings outside of the state church had been abolished, the requirement for each person to attend their own local parish (sockenbandet) had been loosened, etc. However, several other things would be desirable. Thomander again spoke in favor of church synods, the reorganization of cathedral chapters, a new system of selecting priests, and more. It is probably not too much to say that Thomander is primarily to be thanked for what was done. What he meant can best be seen by comparing the 1850s with another critical period, the 1870s, which showed a particularly sterile church policy.

Thomander was not only of general ecclesiastical importance; he also made significant contributions as head of the diocese. Undoubtedly, it was a great fortune for the diocese that Thomander became its bishop. This softened the antagonism between the different parties. As bishop, Thomander was not entirely to the liking of his old followers, many of whom had begun to idolize the Free Church of Scotland and derived their constitutional ideals from it. Within his diocese, Thomander sought to achieve greater mobility by frequent visits and by organizing clerical society gatherings between the clergy meetings held every six years. In both cases, Thomander became a pioneer for the other dioceses. Thomander took a keen interest in mission work. Together with Reuterdahl, Bring, Peter Wieselgren, Peter Fjellstedt and others, he had participated in the founding of the Lund Missionary Society in 1845, to which he was devoted from then on.

In 1838 Thomander published a catechism; in 1849 he and Wieselgren published a revision of the 1819 Wallin hymnal in order to eliminate the complaints of the revivalists. In 1829 he published Predikningar och nattvardstal ('Sermons and Communion Discourses'), in 1849 Predikningar öfver alla årets sön- och högtidsdagars evangelier ('Sermons on the Gospels of all the Sundays and Feast Days of the Year') (two parts, translated into Danish 1855–1857). The printed sermons do not give a true picture of Thomander's skill as an orator. His humor and irony could not make themselves felt in his sermons, but all the more in his occasional speeches.

As a student speaker, he was unrivaled. The sharp contradictions in his being gave his sermons a peculiar character. They were genuinely human, free from the restraint of the educated aristocracy, and therefore not unfavourably received by the popular revivalists. Thomander reaches his highest point when he contrasts human frailty with the merciful omnipotence of God, but overall it must be said that, at least judging from the printed sermons, he is not a deep preacher. Nor have his sermons been widely read, although the presentation has a rare stylistic fulfilment which is personal and original, without being strained or contrived.

== Death and legacy ==
Thomander died in 1865 in Lund and is buried at Östra kyrkogården.

A characterization of Thomander is given by Gustaf Ljunggren, his biographer in the Swedish Academy, who emphasizes the enigmatic nature of his personality, the strange mixture of jokes and seriousness, which made him less appealing to many as a priest and bishop.

A collection of his more important writings was published in three parts in 1878–1879, Tankar och löjen, belletristiska drag ur Thomanders och C. F. Dahlgrens brefvexling (collected and published by Arvid Ahnfelt, with a biography) in 1876. See also G. Ljunggren, "Inträdestal" (in Svenska akad:s handlingar ifrån år 1796, d. 41, 1867) and C. V. A. Strandberg's (Talis Qualis) reply to this speech, Harald Wieselgren, Ur vår samtid (1880), August Quennerstedt, "Johan Henrik Thomander" (in Lunds stifts Julbok, 1912), O. Hippel, Kyrkolagskommittén 1824–1846. En historisk och kyrkorättslig studie (1914), and Emil Liedgren, "Johan Henrik Thomander : Ett kapitel ur humorns kyrkohistoria" (in Vår Lösen, 1918).

== See also ==
- Sophia Wilkens – Thomander's cousin, an educator

Cultural offices
Preceded by Per Daniel Amadeus Atterbom	Swedish Academy, Seat No 18; 1855–1865	Succeeded by Gustaf Ljunggren
Academic offices
Preceded by Jonas Albin Engeström	Rector of Lund University; 1838–1839	Succeeded by Carl Johan Schlyter
