= Robert Baird (clergyman) =

American clergyman and historian (1798–1863)

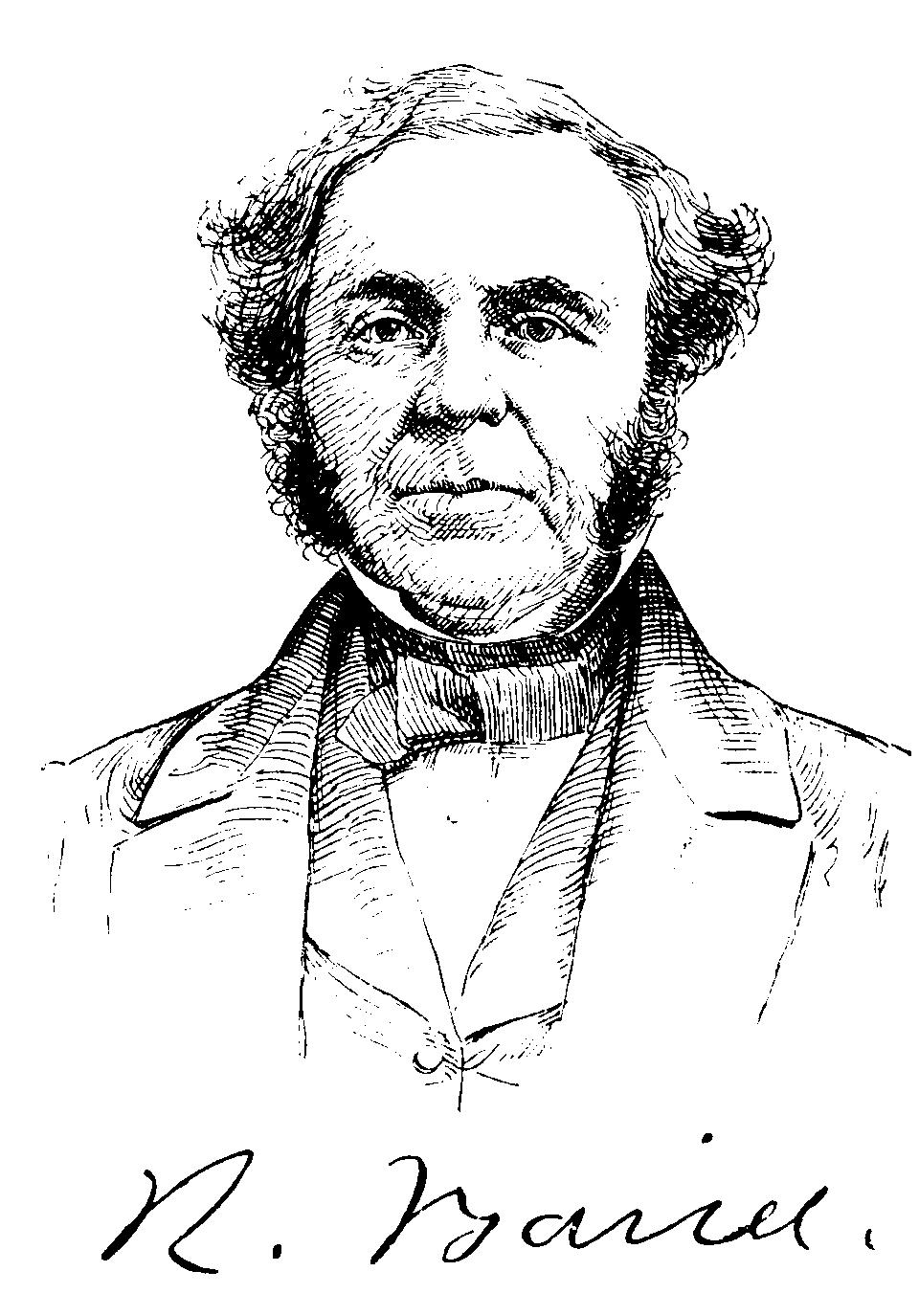
Robert Baird

Robert Baird (October 6, 1798 – March 15, 1863) was an American clergyman and author.

== Life ==
Baird was born in Fayette County, Pennsylvania, near Pittsburgh, and graduated at Jefferson College in 1818 and at Princeton Theological Seminary in 1822. He taught at an academy at Princeton, New Jersey for five years while tutoring at the College of New Jersey and preaching occasionally. (In 1824, he helped to create the Chi Phi Society, a semi-religious, semi-literary organization, which ceased activity the following year when it merged with the Philadelphian Society.) In 1827 Baird became a New Jersey agent for the American Bible Society, distributing Bibles among the poor and laboring among destitute Presbyterian churches. His survey of educational deficiencies eventually led to the introduction of a system of public education in New Jersey.

In 1829 Baird became an agent for the American Sunday School Union and traveled extensively for the society. In 1835 he went to Europe, where he remained eight years, devoting himself to the promotion of Protestant Christianity in southern Europe and subsequently to the advocacy of temperance reform in northern Europe. On the formation of the Foreign Evangelical Society, since merged in the American and Foreign Christian Union, he became its agent and corresponding secretary.

Baird's visit to Sweden in the mid-1830s inaugurated a new temperance movement there, and the Svenska nykterhetssällskapet (Swedish Temperance Society) was founded in 1837. In 1840, he worked with temperance activists Peter Wieselgren and George Scott as well as Läsare (Readers) Lars Paul Esbjörn and Carl Olof Rosenius in Sweden.

In 1848, Baird was elected a member of the American Philosophical Society.

In 1846 Baird visited Europe to attend the world's temperance convention in Stockholm and the meeting of the evangelical alliance in London, and on his return he delivered a series of lectures on the "Continent of Europe." In 1862 he vindicated in London before large audiences the cause of the union against secession with vigorous eloquence.

== Works ==
Baird's works include:

- A History of Temperance Societies in the United States (1836)
- Religion in America (1842). In 1842, while in Geneva, Baird wrote Religion in America, first published in Glasgow, though he revised and expanded it through several printings in the United States, with the edition of 1856 being the most complete. Subsequently, the history was translated into French, German, Dutch, and Swedish. In this work of almost 700 pages, Baird argued that revivalism was a positive feature of American religious experience.
- Protestantism in Italy (1845)
- History of the Albigenses, Waldenses, and Vaudois

Among his other published works are a "View of the Valley of the Mississippi" (1832); "Visit to Northern Europe" (1841)"; " Impressions and Experiences of the West Indies and North America in 1849" (Philadelphia, 1850), revised, with a supplement, in 1855.
