= Ungdomens Nykterhetsförbund =

Ungdomens Nykterhetsförbund (UNF) is a Swedish youth temperance organisation, founded in 1970 after a merging between Sveriges Godtemplares Ungdomsförbund (SGU) and Heimdal. It is the youth organization of the IOGT-NTO movement. It is a member of the European umbrella organisation ACTIVE and the Nordic umbrella organisation NORDGU. UNF has about 7000 members. The current head of the organisation is Jane Segerblom.
