= Jöns Jacob Berzelius =

Swedish chemist (1779–1848)

Jacob Berzelius
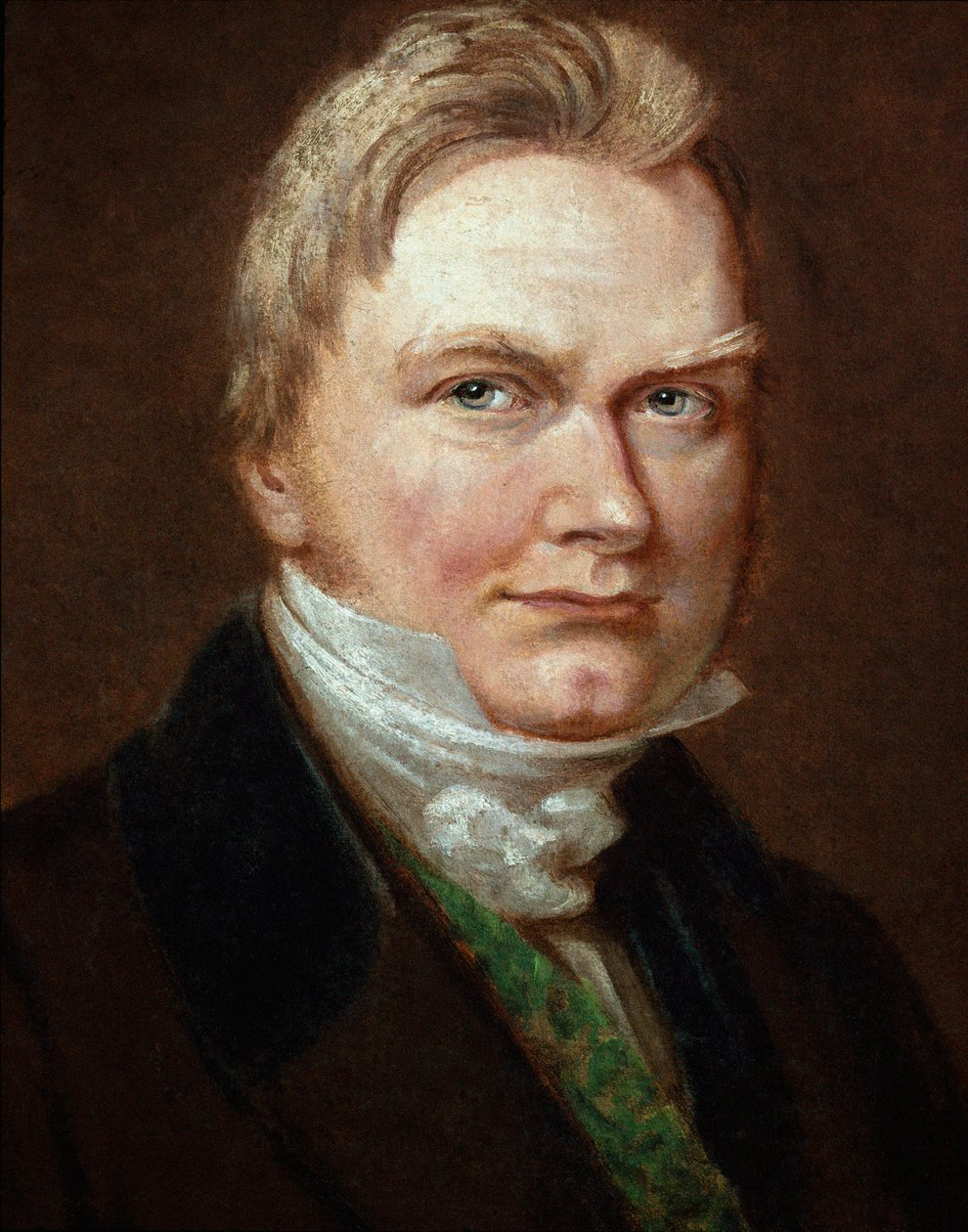
- Berzelius in 1826
- Born: Jöns Jacob Berzelius; 20 August 1779; Väversunda, Östergötland, Sweden
- Died: 7 August 1848 (aged 68); Stockholm, Sweden
- Education: Uppsala University
- Known for: Acrolein; Allotropy; Atomic weights; Bead test; Chemical notation; Catalysis; Discovery of Cerium; Discovery of Selenium; Discovery of Silicon; Discovery of Thorium; Isolation of Zirconium; Test tube; Berzelius beaker
- Awards: Pour le Mérite (1842); Copley medal (1836); ForMemRS (1813)
- Scientific career
- Fields: Chemistry
- Workplaces: Karolinska Institute
- Doctoral advisor: Johann Afzelius
- Doctoral students: James Finlay Weir Johnston; Heinrich Rose; Friedrich Wöhler

Member of the Swedish Academy (Seat No. 5)
- In office 20 December 1837 – 7 August 1848
- Preceded by: Carl von Rosenstein
- Succeeded by: Johan Erik Rydqvist

Jöns Jacob Berzelius (Swedish: [jœ̌ns ˈjɑ̂ːkɔb bæˈʂěːlɪɵs]; 20 August 1779 – 7 August 1848) was a Swedish chemist. Berzelius is considered, along with Robert Boyle, John Dalton, and Antoine Lavoisier, to be one of the founders of modern chemistry. Berzelius became a member of the Royal Swedish Academy of Sciences in 1808 and served from 1818 as its principal functionary. He is known in Sweden as the "Father of Swedish Chemistry". During his lifetime he did not customarily use his first given name, and was universally known simply as Jacob Berzelius.

Although Berzelius began his career as a physician, his enduring contributions were in the fields of electrochemistry, chemical bonding and stoichiometry. In particular, he is noted for his determination of atomic weights and his experiments that led to a more complete understanding of the principles of stoichiometry, which is the branch of chemistry pertaining to the quantitative relationships between elements in chemical compounds and chemical reactions and that these occur in definite proportions. This understanding came to be known as the "Law of Constant Proportions".

Berzelius was a strict empiricist, expecting that any new theory must be consistent with the sum of contemporary chemical knowledge. He developed improved methods of chemical analysis, which were required to develop the basic data in support of his work on stoichiometry. He investigated isomerism, allotropy, and catalysis, phenomena that owe their names to him. Berzelius was among the first to articulate the differences between inorganic compounds and organic compounds. Among the many minerals and elements he studied, he is credited with discovering cerium and selenium, and with being the first to isolate silicon and thorium. Following on his interest in mineralogy, Berzelius synthesized and chemically characterized new compounds of these and other elements.

Berzelius demonstrated the use of an electrochemical cell to decompose certain chemical compounds into pairs of electrically opposite constituents. From this research, he articulated a theory that came to be known as electrochemical dualism, contending that chemical compounds are oxide salts, bonded together by electrostatic interactions. This theory, while useful in some contexts, came to be seen as insufficient. Berzelius's work with atomic weights and his theory of electrochemical dualism led to his development of a modern system of chemical formula notation that showed the composition of any compound both qualitatively and quantitatively. His system abbreviated the Latin names of the elements with one or two letters and applied superscripts to designate the number of atoms of each element present in the compound. Later, chemists changed to use of subscripts rather than superscripts.

== Biography ==
=== Early life and education ===
Berzelius was born in the parish of Väversunda in Östergötland in Sweden. His father Samuel Berzelius was a school teacher in the nearby city of Linköping, and his mother Elizabeth Dorothea Sjösteen was a homemaker. His parents were both from families of church pastors. Berzelius lost both his parents at an early age. His father died in 1779, after which his mother married a pastor named Anders Eckmarck, who gave Berzelius a basic education including knowledge of the natural world. Following the death of his mother in 1787, relatives in Linköping took care of him. There he attended the school today known as Katedralskolan. As a teenager, he took a position as a tutor at a farm near his home, during which time he became interested in collecting flowers and insects and their classification.

Berzelius later enrolled as a medical student at Uppsala University, from 1796 to 1801. Anders Gustaf Ekeberg, the discoverer of tantalum, taught him chemistry during this time. He worked as an apprentice in a pharmacy, during which time he also learned practical matters in the laboratory such as glassblowing. On his own during his studies, he successfully repeated the experimentation conducted by Swedish chemist Carl William Scheele which led to Scheele's discovery of oxygen. He also worked with a physician in the Medevi mineral springs. During this time, he conducted an analysis of the water from this source. Additionally as part of his studies, in 1800, Berzelius learned about Alessandro Volta's electric pile, the first device that could provide a constant electric current (i.e., the first battery). He constructed a similar battery for himself, consisting of alternating disks of copper and zinc, and this was his initial work in the field of electrochemistry.

As thesis research in his medical studies, he examined the influence of galvanic current on several diseases. This line of experimentation produced no clear-cut evidence for such influence. Berzelius graduated as a medical doctor in 1802. He worked as a physician near Stockholm until the chemist and mine-owner Wilhelm Hisinger recognized his abilities as an analytical chemist and provided him with a laboratory.

=== Academic career ===
In 1807, Berzelius was appointed professor in chemistry and pharmacy at the Karolinska Institute. Between 1808 and 1836, Berzelius worked together with Anna Sundström, who acted as his assistant and was the first female chemist in Sweden.

In 1808, he was elected a member of the Royal Swedish Academy of Sciences. At this time, the Academy had been stagnating for several years, since the era of romanticism in Sweden had led to less interest in the sciences. In 1818, Berzelius was elected the Academy's secretary and held the post until 1848. During Berzelius's tenure, he is credited with revitalising the Academy and bringing it into a second golden era (the first being the astronomer Pehr Wilhelm Wargentin's period as secretary from 1749 to 1783). He was elected a Foreign Honorary Member of the American Academy of Arts and Sciences in 1822. In 1827, he became correspondent of the Royal Institute of the Netherlands, and in 1830 associate member. In 1837, he was elected a member of the Swedish Academy, on chair number 5.

=== Temperance movement ===
Berzelius was active in the temperance movement. Along with Bengt Franc-Sparre, August von Hartmansdorff, Anders Retzius, Samuel Owen, George Scott, and others, he was one of the founders of the Svenska nykterhetssällskapet (the Swedish Temperance Society) in 1837 and its first chairman. Berzelius wrote the foreword to one of Carl af Ekenstam's works on the topic, of which 50,000 copies were printed.

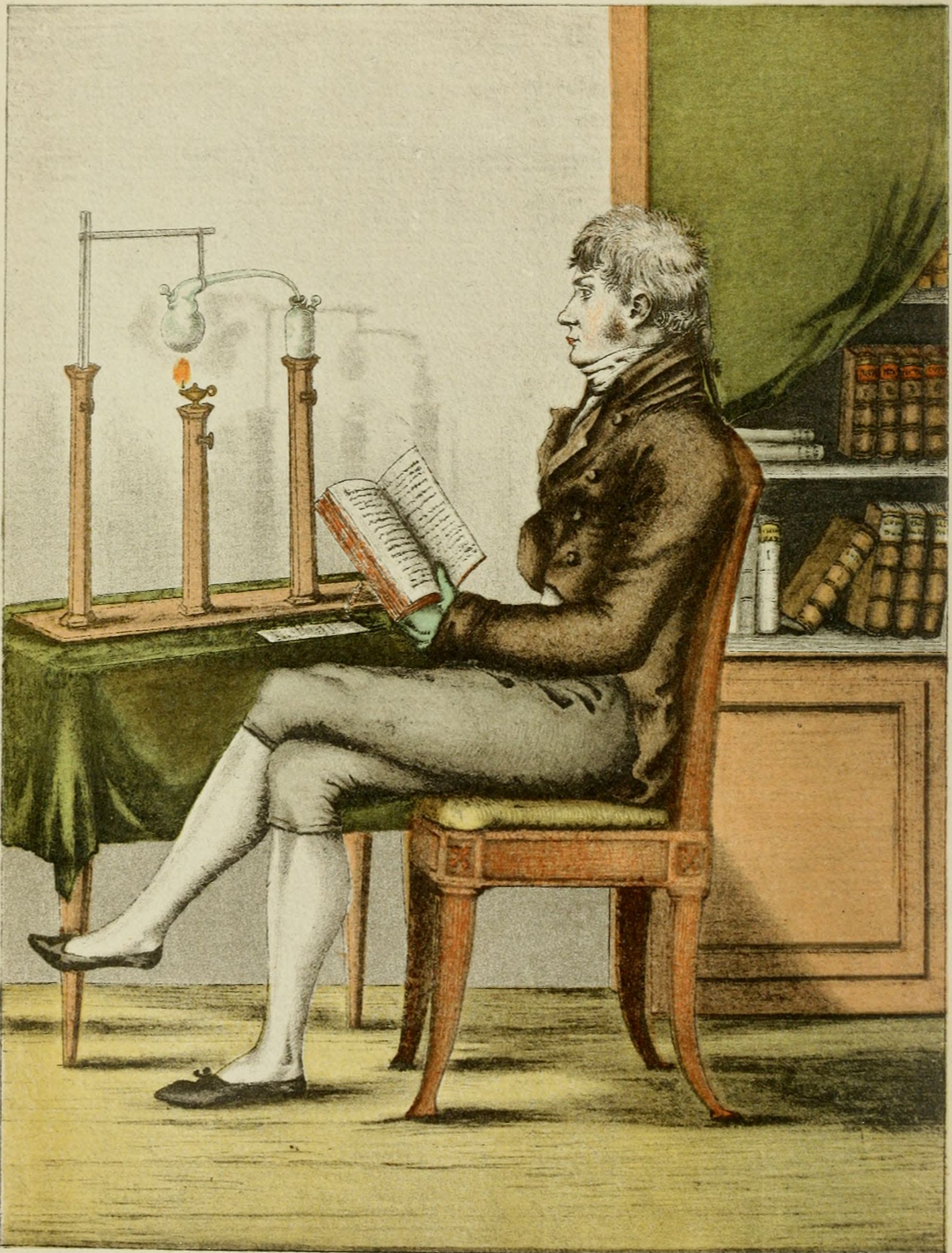
Illustration of Berzelius (published 1903)

=== Later life ===
Through much of his life, Berzelius suffered various medical ailments. These included recurrent migraine headaches and then later on he suffered from gout. He also had episodes of depression.

In 1818, Berzelius had a nervous breakdown, said to be due to the stress of his work. The medical advice he received was to travel and take vacation. However, during this time, Berzelius traveled to France to work in the chemical laboratories of Claude Louis Berthollet.

In 1835, at the age of 56, he married Elizabeth Poppius, the 24-year-old daughter of a Swedish cabinet minister.

At 63 he was elected to Honorary membership of the Manchester Literary and Philosophical Society on 18 April 1843

He died on 7 August 1848 at his home in Stockholm, where he had lived since 1806. He is buried in the Solna Cemetery.

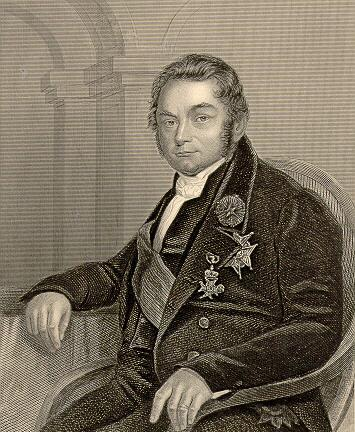
Portrait by Olof Johan Södermark (1790–1848). Print Artist: Charles W. Sharpe, d. 1875(76)

== Achievements ==
=== Law of definite proportions ===
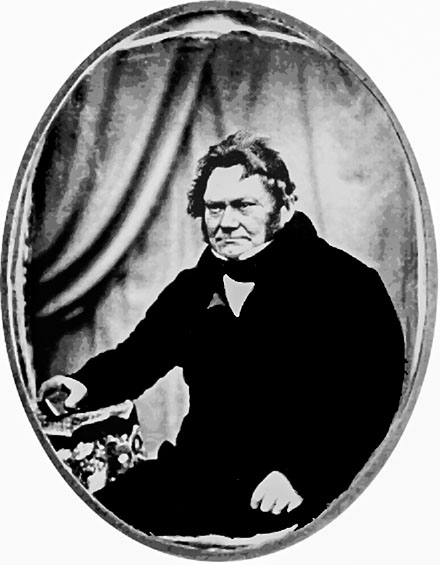
Daguerreotype of Berzelius

Soon after arriving in Stockholm, Berzelius wrote a chemistry textbook for his medical students, Lärbok i Kemien, which was his first significant scientific publication. He had conducted experimentation, in preparation for writing this textbook, on the compositions of inorganic compounds, which was his earliest work on definite proportions. In 1813–4, he submitted a lengthy essay (published in five separate articles) on the proportions of elements in compounds. The essay commenced with a general description, introduced his new symbolism, and examined all the known elements. The essay ended with a table of the "specific weights" (relative atomic masses) of the elements, where oxygen was set to 100, and a selection of compounds written in his new formalism. This work provided evidence in favour of the atomic theory proposed by John Dalton: that inorganic chemical compounds are composed of atoms of different elements combined in whole number amounts. In discovering that atomic weights are not integer multiples of the atomic weight of hydrogen, Berzelius also disproved Prout's hypothesis that elements are built up from atoms of hydrogen. Berzelius's last revised version of his atomic weight tables was first published in a German translation of his Textbook of Chemistry in 1826.

=== Chemical notation ===
In order to aid his experiments, he developed a system of chemical notation in which the elements composing any particular chemical compound were given simple written labels—such as O for oxygen, or Fe for iron—with their proportions in the chemical compound denoted by numbers. Berzelius thus invented the system of chemical notation still used today, the main difference being that instead of the subscript numbers used today (e.g., H_{2}O or Fe_{2}O_{3}), Berzelius used superscripts (H^{2}O or Fe^{2}O^{3}).

=== Discovery of elements ===
Berzelius is credited with discovering the chemical elements cerium and selenium - these discoveries were made in 1803 and 1817 respectively. Berzelius also discovered how to isolate silicon and thorium in 1824, as well as titanium and zirconium. Students working in Berzelius's laboratory also discovered lithium, lanthanum, and vanadium.

Berzelius discovered amorphous silicon by repeating an experiment performed by Gay-Lussac and Thénard in which they reacted silicon tetrafluoride with potassium metal which produced very impure silicon. In a variation of this experiment Berzelius heated potassium fluorosilicate with potassium. It produced potassium silicide which he then stirred with water to produce relatively pure silicon powder. Berzelius recognized this powder as the new element of silicon, which he called silicium, a name proposed earlier by Davy.

Berzelius was the first to isolate zirconium in 1824, but pure zirconium was not produced until 1925, by Anton Eduard van Arkel and Jan Hendrik de Boer.

=== New chemical terms ===
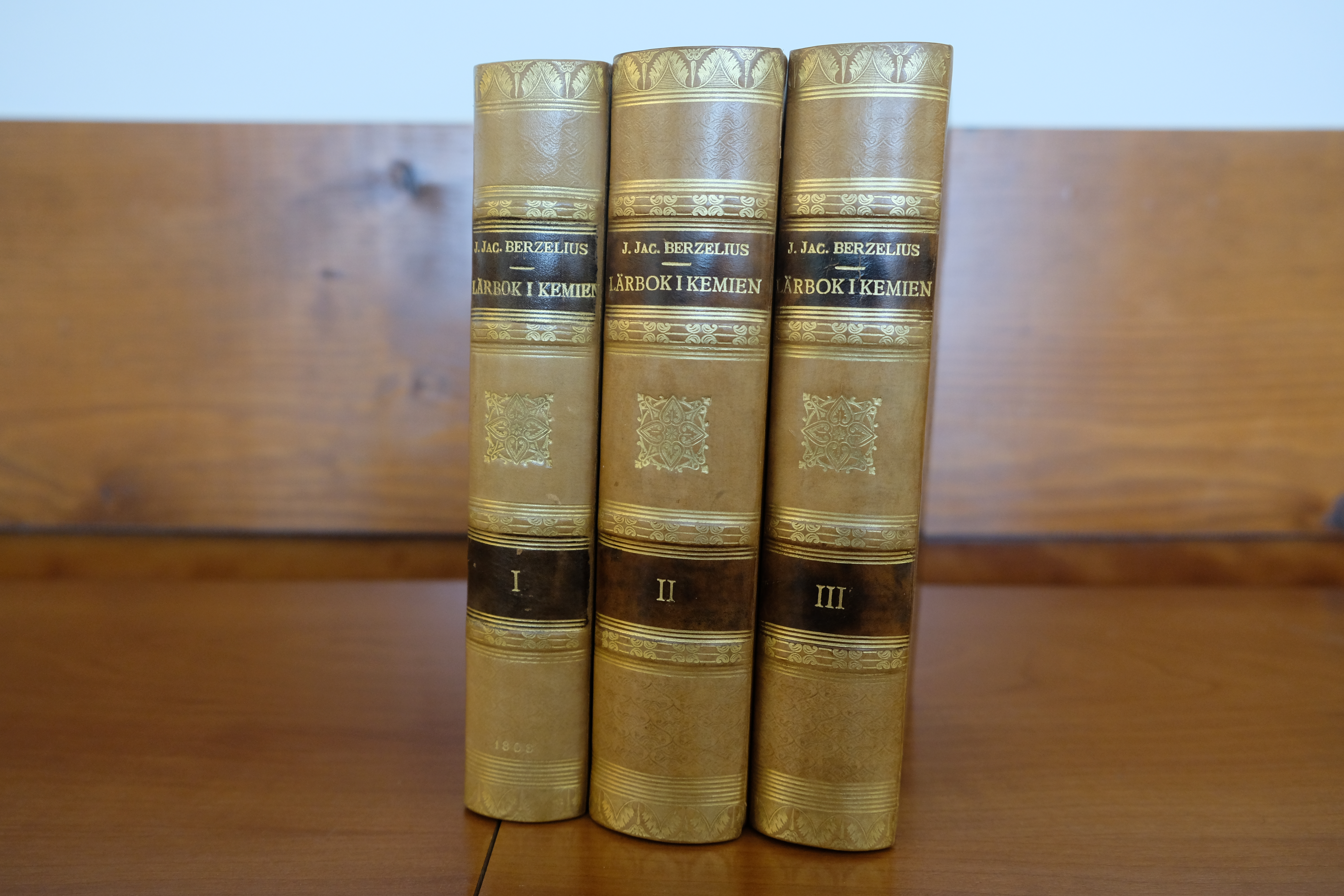
Volumes I-III of Lärbok i kemien

Berzelius is credited with originating the chemical terms "catalysis", "polymer," "isomer," "protein" and "allotrope," although his original definitions in some cases differ significantly from modern usage. As an example, he coined the term "polymer" in 1833 to describe organic compounds which shared identical empirical formulas but which differed in overall molecular weight, the larger of the compounds being described as "polymers" of the smallest. At this time the concept of chemical structure had not yet been developed so that he considered only the numbers of atoms of each element. In this way, he viewed for example glucose (C_{6}H_{12}O_{6}) as a polymer of formaldehyde (CH_{2}O), even though we now know that glucose is not a polymer of the monomer formaldehyde.

=== Biology and organic chemistry ===
Berzelius was the first person to make the distinction between organic compounds (those containing carbon), and inorganic compounds. In particular, he advised Gerardus Johannes Mulder in his elemental analyses of organic compounds such as coffee, tea, and various proteins. The term protein itself was coined by Berzelius, in 1838, after Mulder observed that all proteins seemed to have the same empirical formula and came to the erroneous conclusion that they might be composed of a single type of very large molecule. The term is derived from the Greek, meaning "of the first rank", and Berzelius proposed the name because proteins were so fundamental to living organisms.

In 1808, Berzelius discovered that lactic acid occurs in muscle tissue, not just in milk.

The term biliverdin was coined by Berzelius in 1840, although he preferred "bilifulvin" (yellow/red) over "bilirubin" (red). He likewise coined the name haemato-globulin which is the etymological origin for hemoglobin.

==== Vitalism ====
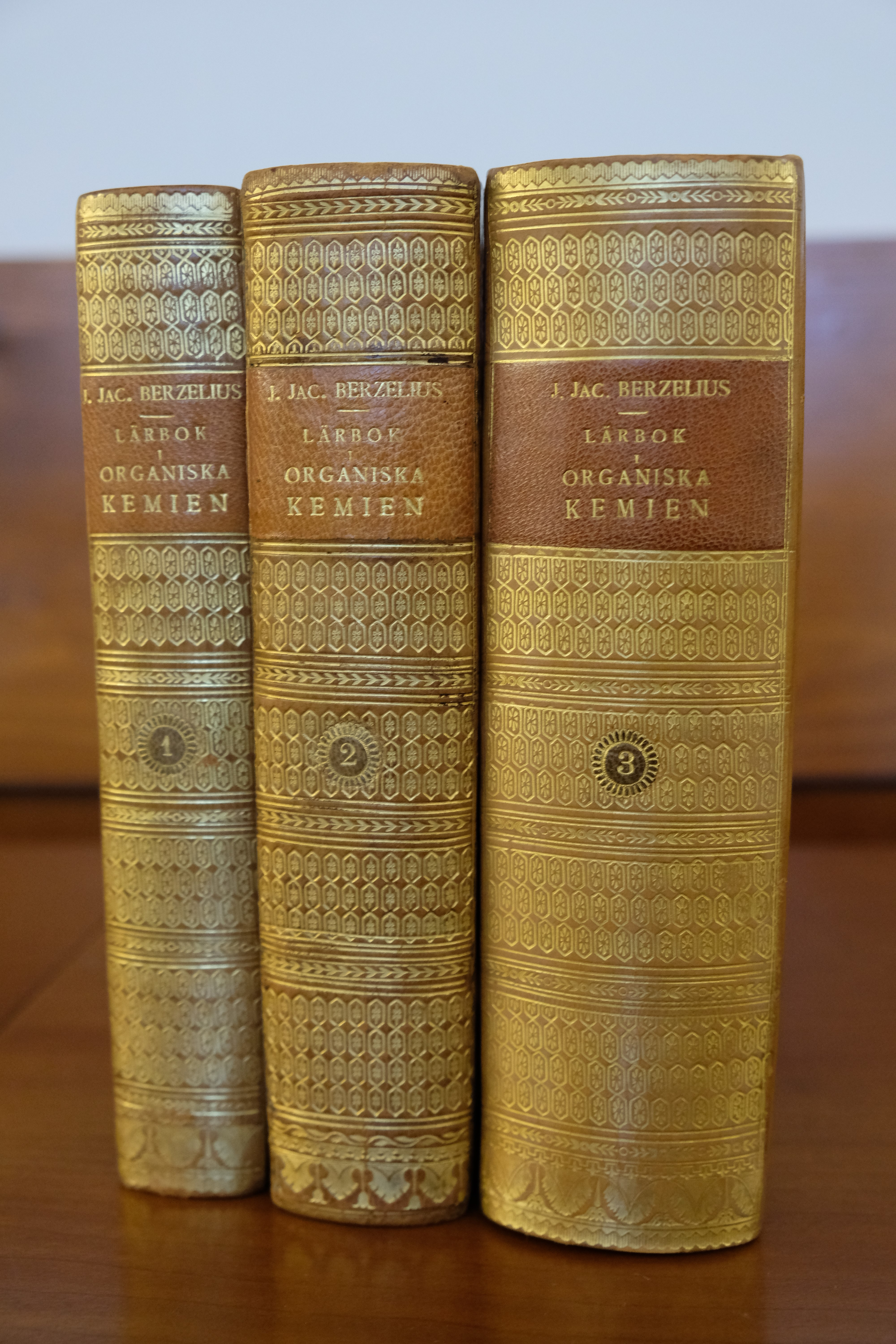
Volumes 4-6 of Lärbok i kemien, titled Lärbok i organiska kemien

Berzelius stated in 1810 that living things work by some mysterious "vital force", a hypothesis called vitalism. Vitalism had first been proposed by prior researchers, although Berzelius contended that compounds could be distinguished by whether they required any organisms in their synthesis (organic compounds) or whether they did not (inorganic compounds). However, in 1828, Friedrich Wöhler accidentally obtained urea, an organic compound, by heating ammonium cyanate. This showed that an organic compound such as urea could be prepared synthetically and not exclusively by living organisms. Berzelius corresponded with Wöhler on the urea synthesis findings. However, the notion of vitalism continued to persist, until further work on abiotic synthesis of organic compounds provided substantial evidence against vitalism.

== Works ==
- Berzelius und Liebig: Ihre Briefe von 1831 - 1845 (in German). München: Lehmann. 1893.
- Letters of Jöns Jakob Berzelius and Christian Friedrich Schönbein. London: Williams & Norgate. 1900.
- Selbstbiographische Aufzeichnungen (in German). Leipzig: Johann Ambrosius Barth. 1903.
- Lärbok i kemien (in Swedish). Stockholm, Nordström, 1808-1830.
- Tabell, som utvisar vigten af större delen vid den oorganiska Kemiens studium märkvärdiga enkla och sammansatta kroppars atomer, jemte deras sammansättning, räknad i procent (in Swedish). Stockholm : H.A. Nordström, 1818.

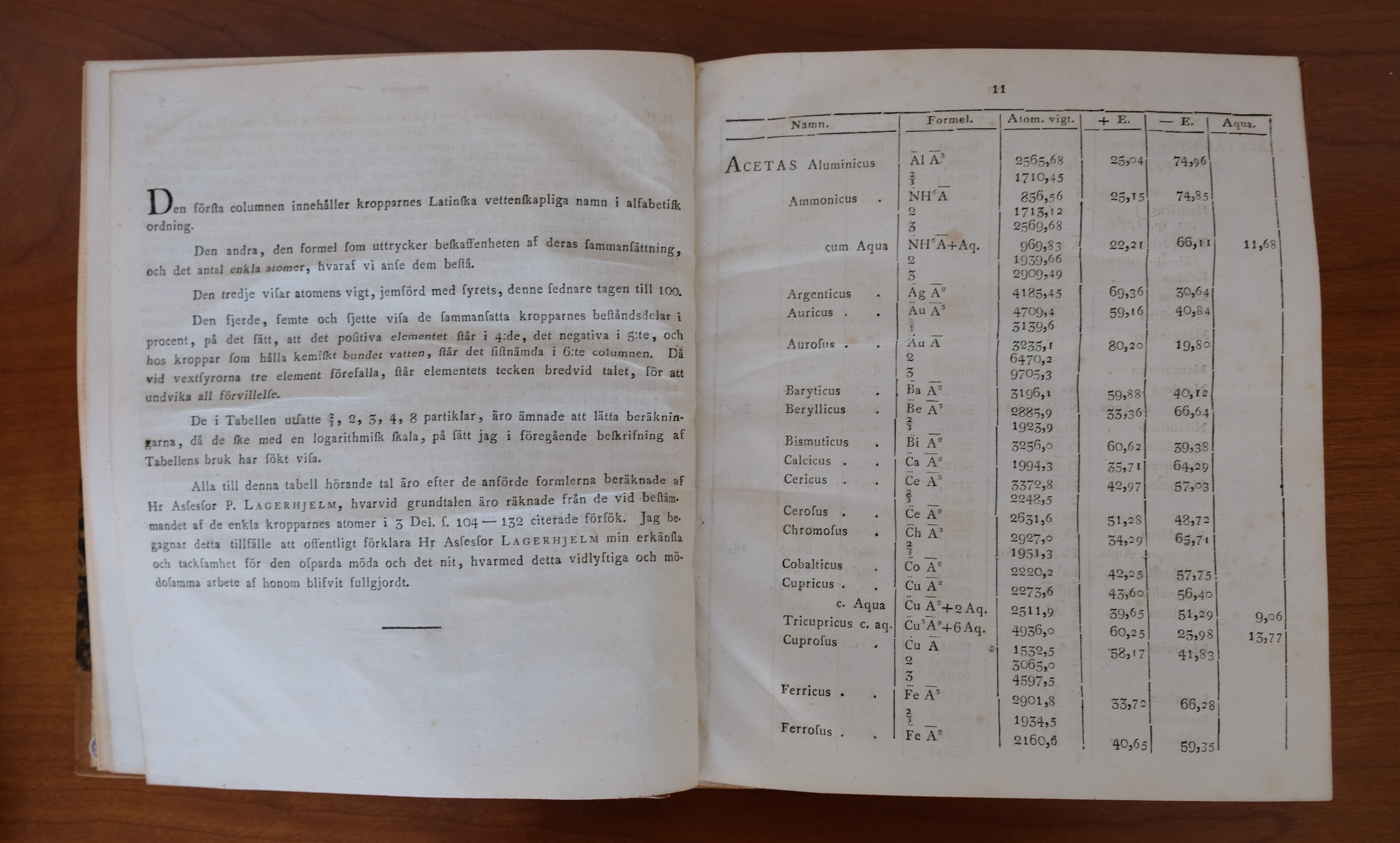
Figures in an 1818 copy of Berzelius's "Tabell, som utvisar vigten af större delen vid den oorganiska Kemiens studium"

== Relations with other scientists ==
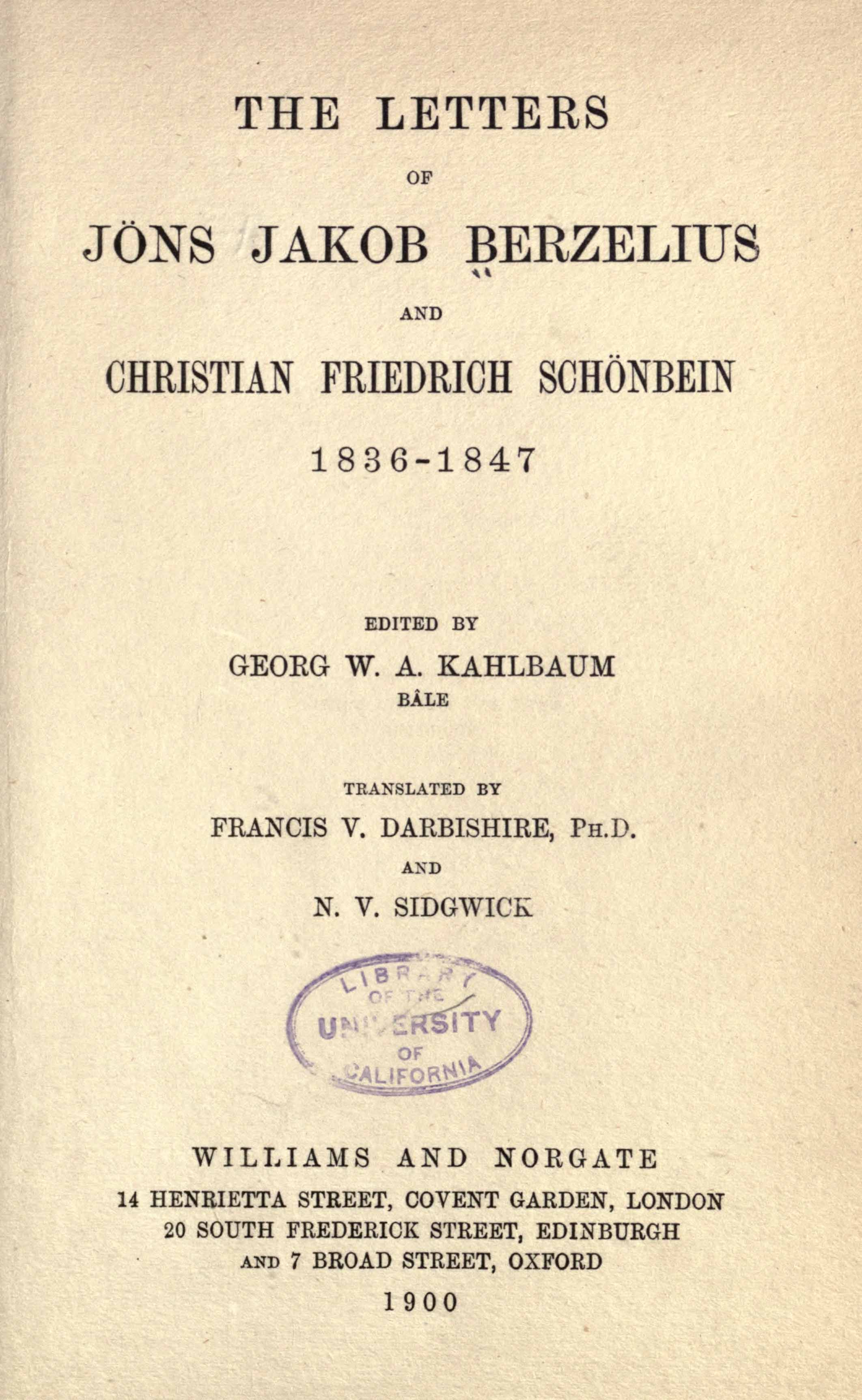
The Letters of Jöns Jakob Berzelius and Christian Friedrich Schönbein 1836 1847, London 1900

Berzelius was a prolific correspondent with leading scientists of his time, such as Gerardus Johannes Mulder, Claude Louis Berthollet, Humphry Davy, Friedrich Wöhler, Eilhard Mitscherlich and Christian Friedrich Schönbein.

In 1812, Berzelius traveled to London, England, including Greenwich to meet with prominent British scientists of the time. These included Humphry Davy, chemist William Wollaston, physician-scientist Thomas Young, astronomer William Herschel, chemist Smithson Tennant, and inventor James Watt, among others. Berzelius also visited Davy's laboratory. After his visit to Davy's laboratory, Berzelius remarked, "A tidy laboratory is a sign of a lazy chemist."

Humphry Davy in 1810 proposed that chlorine is an element. Berzelius rejected this claim because of his belief that all acids were based on oxygen. Since chlorine forms a strong acid (muriatic acid, modern HCl), chlorine must contain oxygen and thus cannot be an element. However, in 1812, Bernard Courtois proved that iodine is an element. Then in 1816 Joseph-Louis Gay-Lussac demonstrated that prussic acid (hydrogen cyanide) contains only hydrogen, carbon, and nitrogen, and no oxygen. These findings persuaded Berzelius that not all acids contain oxygen, and that Davy and Gay-Lussac were correct: chlorine and iodine are indeed elements.

== Honors and recognition ==
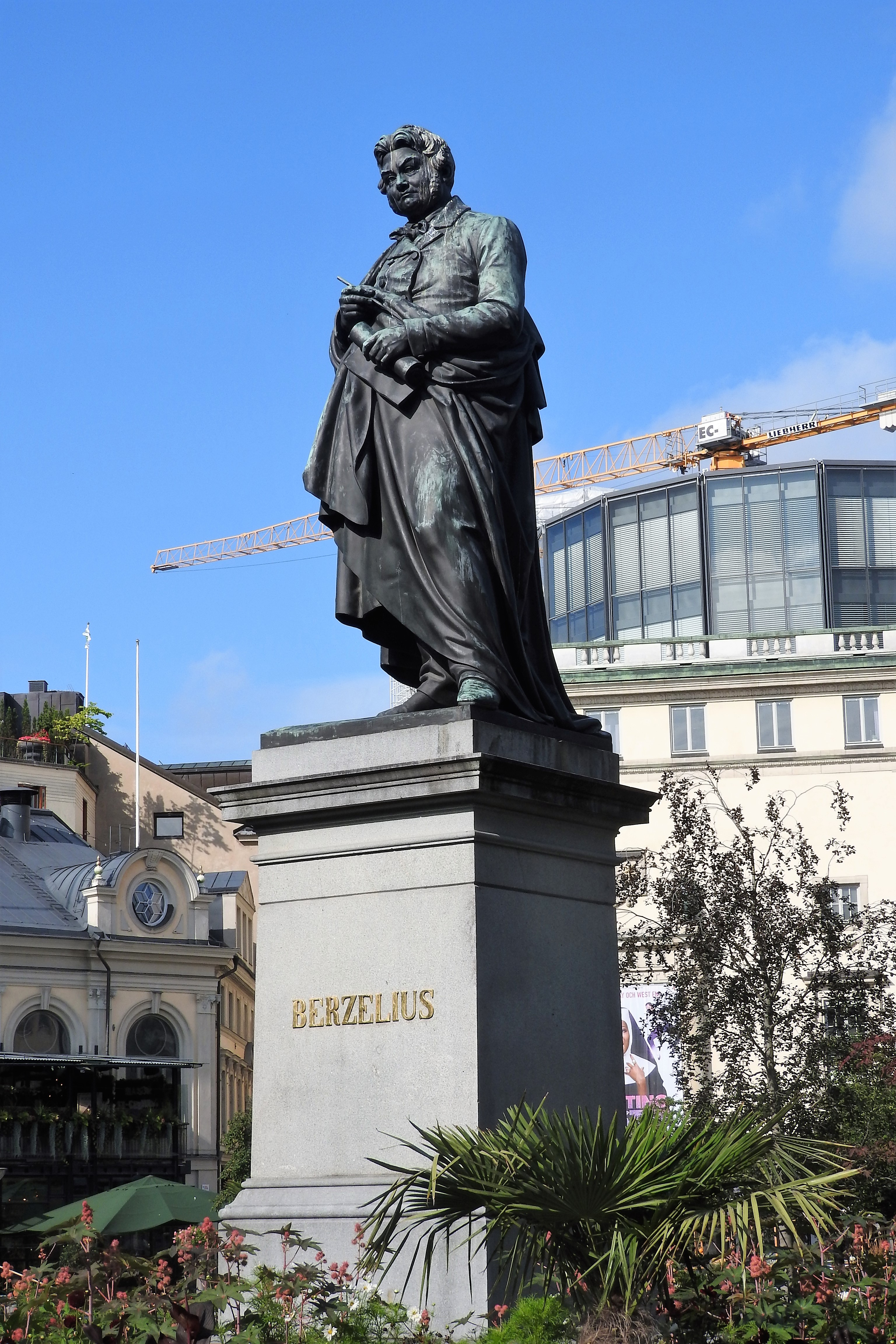
Statue of Berzelius in the center of Berzelii Park, Stockholm

In 1818 Berzelius was ennobled by King Carl XIV Johan. In 1835, he received the title of friherre.

In 1820 he was elected a member of the American Philosophical Society.

The Royal Society of London gave Berzelius the Copley Medal in 1836 with the citation "For his systematic application of the doctrine of definite proportions to the analysis of mineral bodies, as contained in his Nouveau Systeme de Mineralogie, and in other of his works."

In 1840, Berzelius was named Knight of the Order of Leopold. In 1842, he received the honor Pour le Mérite for Sciences and Arts.

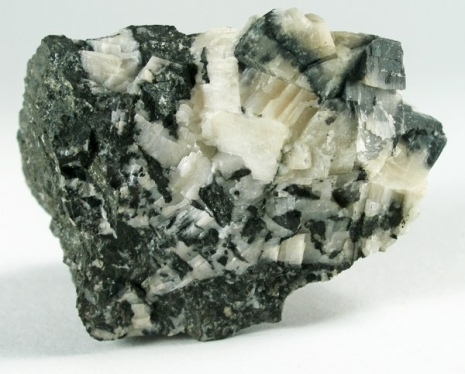
Berzelianite included in calcite from the Skrikerum mine in Sweden

The mineral berzelianite, a copper selenide, was discovered in 1850 and named after him by James Dwight Dana.

In 1852, Stockholm, Sweden, built a public park and statue, both to honor Berzelius. Berzeliusskolan, a school situated next to his alma mater, Katedralskolan, is named for him. In 1890, a fairly prominent street in Gothenburg was named Berzeliigatan (Berzelii street) in his honour.

In 1898, the Swedish Academy of Sciences opened the Berzelius Museum in honor of Berzelius. The holdings of the museum included many items from his laboratory. The museum was opened on the occasion of fiftieth anniversary of Berzelius's death. Invitees at the ceremony marking the occasion included scientific dignitaries from eleven European nations and the United States, many of whom gave formal addresses in honor of Berzelius. The Berzelius Museum was later moved to the observatory that is part of the Swedish Academy of Sciences.

In 1939 his portrait appeared on a series of postage stamps commemorating the bicentenary of the founding of the Swedish Academy of Sciences. In addition to Sweden, Grenada likewise honored him.

The Berzelius Society at Yale University is named in his honor.

Berzeliustinden, a 1,211-metre (3,973 ft) mountain on Spitsbergen, is named in Berzelius's honor. Berzelius crater on the Moon was named after him.

== See also ==
- Berzelius beaker
- Chemical crystallography before X-rays

Cultural offices
Preceded by Carl von Rosenstein	Swedish Academy, Seat No. 5; 1837–48	Succeeded by Johan Erik Rydqvist
