= Peter Fjellstedt =

Swedish missionary (1802–1881)

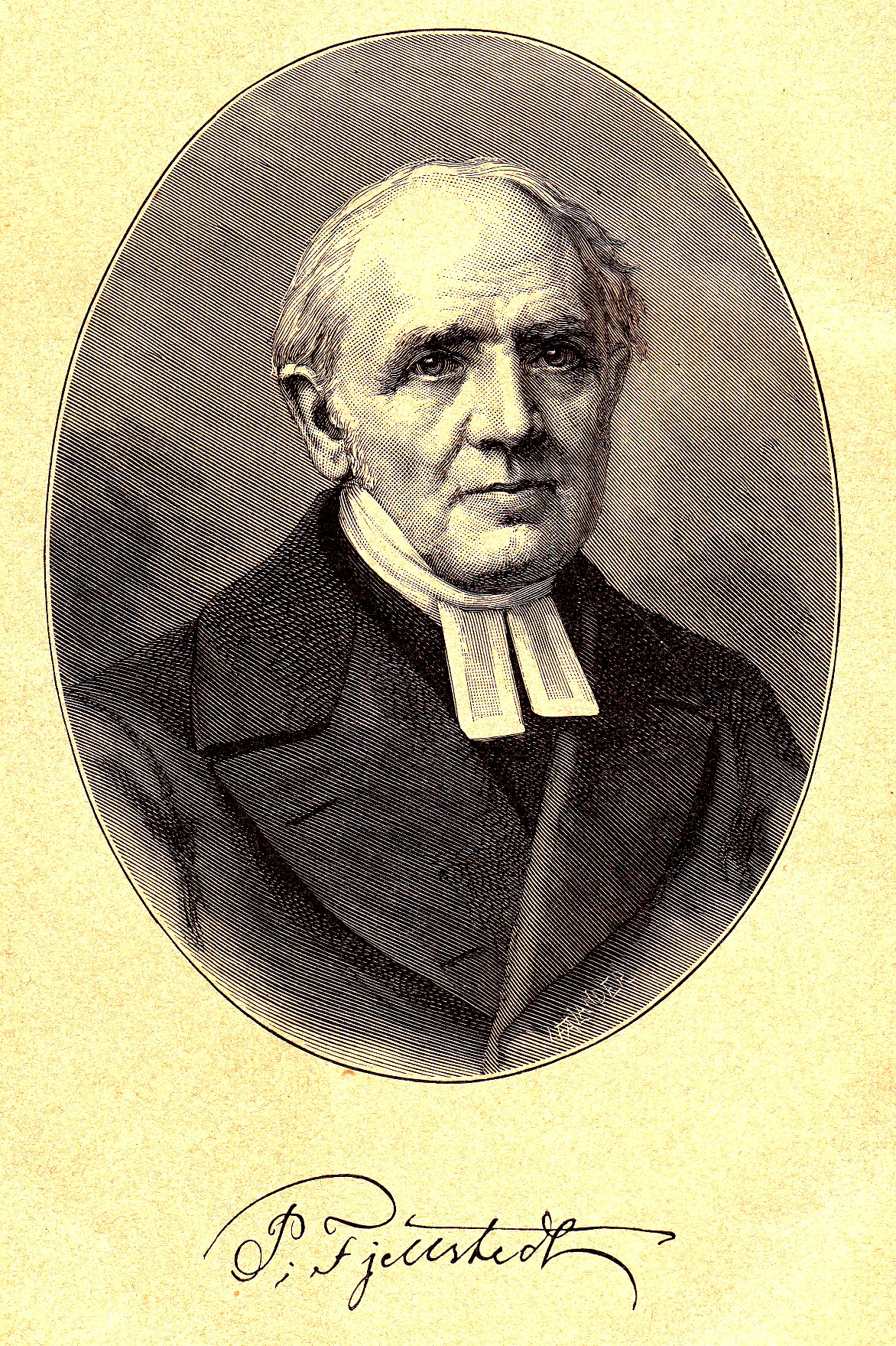
- Born: Peter Larsson; 17 September 1802; Sillerud parish, Värmland County, Sweden
- Died: 4 January 1881 (aged 78); Uppsala cathedral parish, Uppsala County, Sweden
- Occupation(s): Missionary, preacher
- Organization: Church of Sweden
- Spouse: Christina Beata Schweizerbarth (m. 1831; died 1876)

Peter Fjellstedt (17 September 1802 – 4 January 1881) was a Swedish Nyevangelist missionary and preacher who founded the Fjellstedt School and Evangeliska Fosterlands-Stiftelsen.

== Biography ==
=== Upbringing ===
Fjellstedt was born to carpenter Lars Larsson and Catharina Carlsdotter in Värmland, Sweden in 1802, the first child in a poor family of craftsmen. His surname was originally Larsson. At a young age, he went from farm to farm to beg. In 1812 there was a severe famine in the area and the family had to mix bark and bone meal in their bread.

For several winters, he contributed to the family's livelihood by teaching the children of the neighbouring village to read and write. In the summers, he had to herd the family's sheep in the Dalsland forests around the cottage. Fjellstedt writes in his autobiography: "Often I went up on some big rock and preached, as best I could, to my cows, sheep and lambs". At one of these places where he preached there was a large stone which later came to be known as the Fjellstedt Stone and where every year since 1965 a service is held in his memory.

=== Education ===
After Fjellstedt was confirmed, he managed to get into Karlstad's school of learning, thanks to gifts from the more prosperous farms in the area. He walked the 100-kilometre (62 mi) distance there. He then studied in Karlstad for three and a half years, renting living space from a tavernkeeper and having to sleep on the lid of a wooden chest with his coat for a blanket. In the school's name register he was for the first time given the surname Fjellstedt, after his home village of Fjällane.

In 1823, Fjellstedt began studies at Lund University in Christian ministry. There he met Esaias Tegnér, who encouraged him, even stating: "I have seen, tested and approved Peter Fjellstedt." He later stayed in Småland for over a year and a half working for Lieutenant Colonel C. Kuylenstierna and Major C. J. von Mentzer as a private tutor, where he experienced a strong spiritual revival. Fjellstedt returned to Lund in 1825 to complete his studies, where he was taught by a follower of Pietistic priest Henric Schartau. He also became convinced of his calling to go out as a missionary, a conviction that was consolidated during a time as a teacher at the Moravian school in Gothenburg. The school's founder had a number of writings on missions work which Fjellstedt had access to. He was ordained in May 1828 in Karlstad by Bishop Bjurbäck.

=== Missions work ===
Fjellstedt then undertook further missionary training with Basel Mission, after which he went to London in 1829. On his way there, he made a visit to Sweden, where he met Peter Wieselgren and led to the founding of Svenska missionssällskapet i Göteborg ('the Swedish Mission Society in Gothenburg'). He met some Swedish church leaders, including Frans Michael Franzén and Johan Jacob Hedrén. In London, Fjellstedt studied medicine and had planned to study Arabic, Amharic, and Tigrinya to go to Ethiopia, but he was unable to go there so instead he studied Persian and Coptic. He married Christina Beata Schweizerbarth in London in 1831. The next year, he was sent by the Church Mission Society to Palayamkottai in Tamil Nadu, India, for his first missionary assignment. After three years, he returned home due to poor health, with one of his children dying on the trip home. In Stuttgart, he met one of his old friends from Basel, German missionary Johann Ludwig Krapf. He went on a further assignment to Izmir, Turkey, in 1836, as well as Malta, but left the mission field again in 1840. He then returned to Basel, where he served as a teacher at the Mission Institute.

=== Return to Sweden ===
After working for a time as a traveling preacher in Switzerland, Germany and France, Fjellstedt returned to Sweden in 1843, where he was involved in teaching, writing and training. This involved a preaching tour in which he preached for 100,000 people in most of the counties of southern and central Sweden, speaking engagingly about his mission work. One priest, P. Wagenius, after hearing Fjellstedt's preaching likely in 1857, described the scene:

"When I go back even further in my memory and search for such heavenly impressions, which are sweet to the spirit, I remember a beautiful summer evening in the Östersund church, when the western sun shone through the windows and shone around the man of God, who then stood on the pulpit and testified about the divine, glorious world mission. With the most joyful assurance and rapture he recited and applied many, many of the prophetic promises about the time when the earth will be filled with the knowledge of the Lord, just as the waters cover the bottom of the sea. I remember how vividly and joyfully for the Christian hope he described the stream of living water which, according to Ezek. 47 and other passages, proceeds from the house of the Lord, and spreads in greater and greater abundance over the wasteland into the sea, and makes all things healthy and fruitful by its life-giving power. Hearing his discourse from the Old and New Testaments, one understood that the divine revelation and the history of the development of the kingdom of God lay before him like an open book. His appearance, his cheerful assurance of faith, his clear, glorious presentation, made me think I saw and heard one of the Old Testament prophets standing there before the Lord, proclaiming the revelations he had received from Him."

In 1845, money was gathered to support Fjellstedt and his family through enabling him to preach, establishing the Lund Missionary Society, where he became director in 1846. Bishops Henrik Reuterdahl, Ebbe Gustaf Bring and priests Johan Henrik Thomander, Peter Wieselgren, and Paul Gabriel Ahnfelt were some of those involved in the organization. Its first two students in the 1840s were some of the first Swedish missionaries to China, Carl Joseph Fast and Anders Elgqvist. The institute moved first to Stockholm in 1856 and later to Uppsala in 1859, where it was renamed in 1862 and became a school for future priests: the Fjellstedt School.

Fjellstedt was awarded an honorary doctorate of theology by the University of Halle in Germany in 1853. His wife and children primarily stayed in Germany as she did not like life in Sweden.

He and others, including Carl Axel Torén and Hans Jacob Lundborg, had been influenced by the Free Church of Scotland and its pastors such as James Lumsden and saw the need to form a mission society to bring revival to the Swedish church. In 1855, he proposed the foundation of a new free church mission, the Evangeliska Fosterlands-Stiftelsen, which was founded the following year. The organization remained part of the Lutheran church but was influenced by, and had much in common with, the Baptists and other free churches. A number of free-church colporteurs, itinerant sellers of Christian literature, were involved early on; however, many left to form the Baptist Union of Sweden in 1857. Fjellstedt would later influence the organization to begin mission work among the Oromo people in the Horn of Africa.

Fjellstedt supported lay preacher Amelie von Braun's pioneering Sunday school work, which she began sometime between 1848 and 1856. He also visited philanthropist Emilie Petersen, known as the 'Herrestad Grandmother' (Mormor på Herrestad). She was godmother to his son Joel.

From 1861 to 1863, he preached in Överum. He also led a church meeting in which it was discussed whether or not to stay in the state church. Participants included Carl Olof Rosenius, Gustav Adolph Lammers, Bernhard Wadström, Per August Ahlberg, and Per Magnus Elmblad. After that, he worked at the Gothenburg cathedral with Peter Wieselgren for nine years, then spent several years in Germany before returning to Uppsala in the last few years of his life after his wife's death in 1876. Towards the end of his life he was engaged in writing; his Biblia, det är all den Heliga skrift, med förklaringar was one of Baptist publisher Per Palmqvist's most significant publications.

Upon his friend Wieselgren's death in 1877, he buried him at Stampens Cemetery in Gothenburg.

He was the first president of the organization Lapska missionens vänner, founded in 1880, which supported missions work in Lappmarken and was supported by the Swedish royal family and the Church of Sweden.

=== Religious views ===
Fjellstedt was part of the Nyevangelism movement and a key figure among the Mission Friends. He was critical of the state of Christianity in the country. Around 1850 he wrote to the missionary inspector Blumhardt in Basel, "The state of Christianity in Sweden is very deplorable, and the cause is an ignorance which surpasses all imagination, and that among all classes of people."

Fjellstedt placed an emphasis on Christian eschatology, holding a historic premillennial, non-dispensationalist view on the Second Coming of Jesus, which he preached on. His work Bibliska framtidsvinkar also addresses these topics, discussing the signs of the times and the date of the return of Christ as well as the Antichrist and the apostasy of the Jews.

In 1856–1861 he wrote a Bible version with commentaries between the original verses. It was published in nine editions until 1919.

=== Death ===
He died in Uppsala in 1881 and is buried in Uppsala old cemetery.

== Selected works ==
- Biblia, det är all den Heliga skrift, med förklaringar (3 volumes, 1849–1855)
- Lunds missionstidning (1846–1861)
- Bibelvännen (1848–1861)
- Bibelns apokryfiska böcker (1855)
- Andaktsbok för fångar (1849), awarded a royal prize
- Foreword to Concordia pia. Evangeliskt luterska kyrkans symboliska böcker (1853)
