= Per August Ahlberg =

Swedish priest (1823–1887)

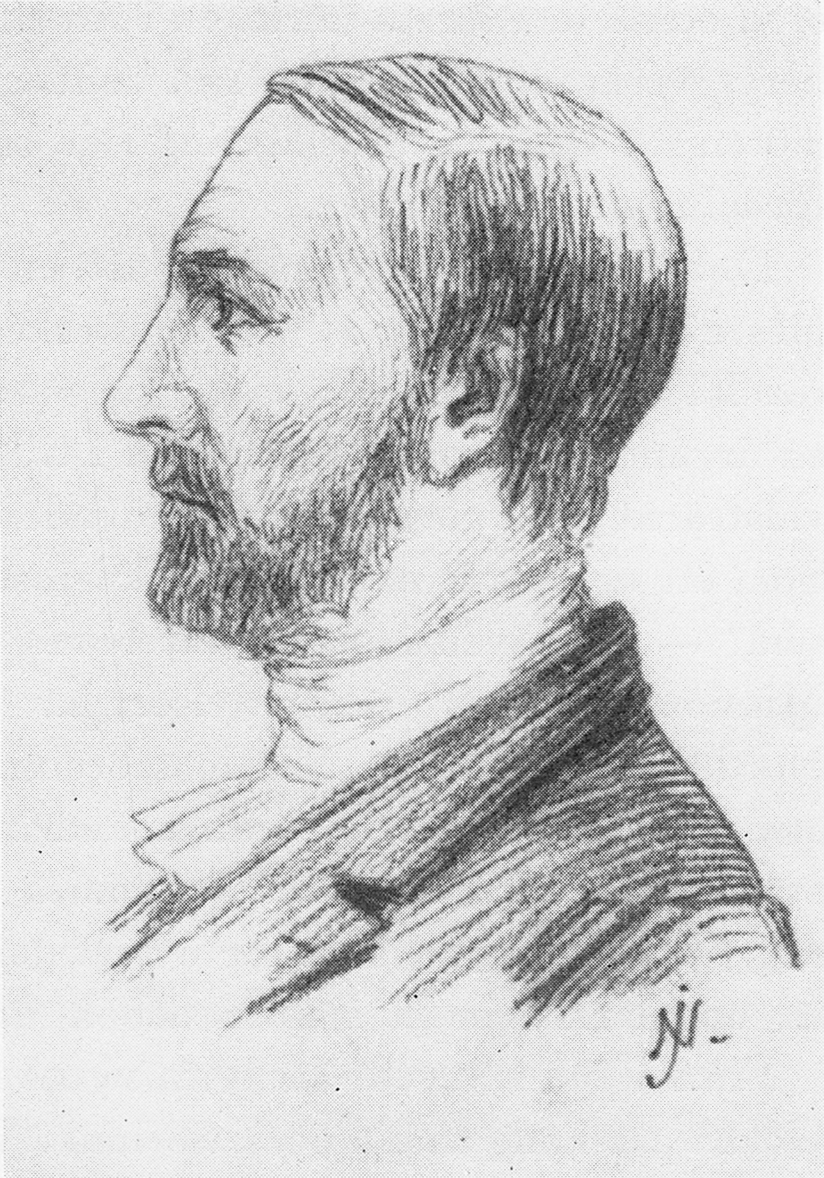
- Born: 13 August 1823; Mörlunda, Kalmar County, Sweden
- Died: 1 July 1887 (aged 63); Örebro, Sweden
- Occupation(s): Priest, folk school teacher, preacher
- Employer: Church of Sweden
- Spouses: Adeline Jeanette Sabelström (m. 1851; died 1881) Hilma Gustava Seseman (m. 1882)
- Children: David Ahlberg

Per August Ahlberg (13 August 1823 – 1 July 1887) was a Swedish revivalist pastor and missionary who made a large impact on the spiritual environment of Småland, Sweden, founding a number of mission schools for colporteurs.

== Biography ==
Ahlberg was born in Mörlunda, Kalmar County. His father, Jöns Petter Ahlberg from Raskarum in St Olof's parish in Scania, was an equine veterinarian and farrier for the Småland hussars. His mother was Lukretia Gustafsdotter. After attending school in Vimmerby and studying in Linköping, Ahlberg worked as an apothecary's apprentice and as a teacher; he also took his folk school teacher's examination in 1847. In the 1840s he studied further in Lund and Uppsala. On 13 June 1847 he was ordained a priest in Linköping Cathedral for service in the Church of Sweden. After becoming assistant pastor in the parish of Östra Tollstad in 1847, he served in various parishes in the Vimmerby and Eksjö area before becoming involved in mission schools for colporteurs. Ahlberg became director of the Swedish Mission Society's mission school in Stockholm in 1857. From 1858 to 1861 he was director of the mission school in Kristdala and then of the mission school at Alsborg in Vetlanda parish.

He lived and worked in Vetlanda for fourteen years from 1861 to 1875. The mission school had a total of 328 students during that time and many future priests in the American Augustana Synod were educated there. Among those impacted by Ahlberg's revival in Vetlanda was Jonas Peter Edström, father of sculptor Peter David Edstrom. Initially, Ahlberg kept his collections in his home in Alsborg outside Vetlanda, and in the mineral spa salons in Flugeby and Alsborg, before the first mission house in Vetlanda was built on the Mogärde estate (Missionen block number 176). In the late 1860s, Ahlberg began to make plans for mission work among the emancipated slaves in the United States; however, his plans did not come to be.

In 1875, when the Mission School had grown, it was donated to a foundation and Ahlberg moved to Örebro. There, too, he started school activities while working as a pastor for the Evangelical Lutheran Mission Society. He also worked as a traveling speaker for Svenska nykterhetssällskapet, the Swedish Temperance Society. After Ahlberg's death, the school activities in Örebro were moved to Johannelund Theological Institute. In his later years, he was often ill prior to his death in Örebro in 1887. Ahlberg is known as one of the founders of the Östra Smålands Missionsförening and as the publisher of the book of reflections Biblisk Skattkammare (Biblical Treasury) with many quotations from the Church Fathers. He has been referred to as "the foremost standard bearer of the readers in East Småland" and the revival's leader in the area.

Ahlberg is buried at the Southern Cemetery (Södra kyrkogården) in Örebro. The tombstone is inscribed, "Those who teach many to righteousness shall shine like stars for evermore."

He was married for the first time in 1851 to Adeline Jeanette Sabelström, daughter of a vicar, and for the second time in 1882 to Hilma Gustava Seseman, also the daughter of a vicar. In his first marriage he had eleven children, of whom the four youngest lived to adulthood: Josef, Hulda, Frideborg and David Ahlberg. With his second wife he had two children, both of whom died at a young age.

== Hymns ==
- "Bekymras ej, du arma själ", number 427 in the Augustana Evangelical Lutheran Church's Hemlandssånger (1891)
