= Peter Wieselgren =

Swedish Lutheran priest and activist (1800–1877)

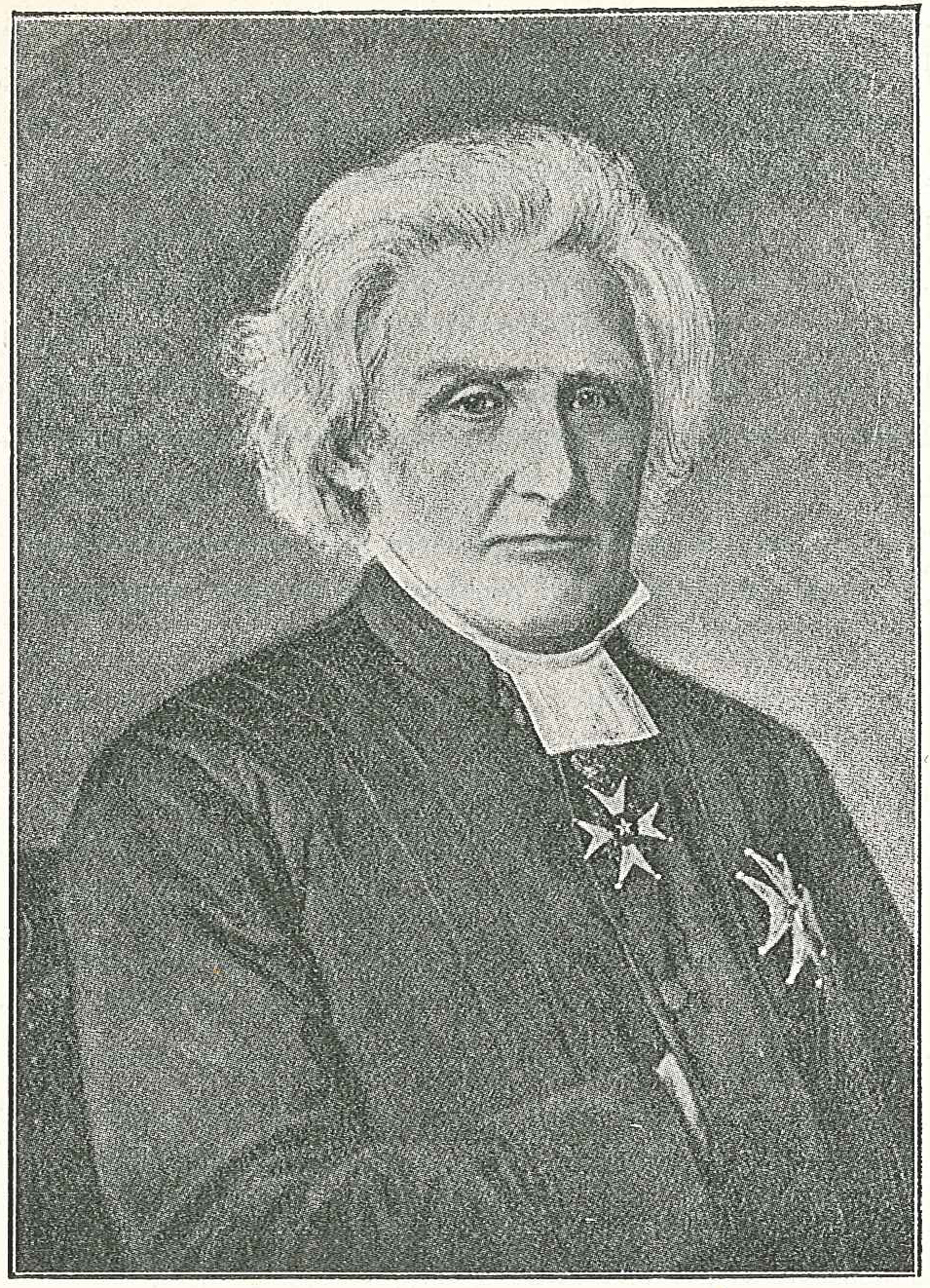
- Wieselgren in his later years with the Order of the Polar Star Commander insignia. Based on a painting by Hilda Lindgren.
- Born: Peter Jonasson; 1 October 1800; Vislanda Parish, Småland, Sweden
- Died: 10 October 1877 (aged 77); Gothenburg, Sweden
- Resting place: Stampen Cemetery, Gothenburg
- Occupation(s): Librarian, archivist, literary historian, priest, theologian
- Spouse: Matilda Catharina Rosenquist (m. 1833)
- Children: 10, including: Harald Wieselgren (born 1835); Sigfrid Wieselgren (born 1843); Magnus Wieselgren (born 1852)

Peter (Per) Wieselgren, born Jonasson (1 October 1800 – 10 October 1877) was a Lutheran priest, librarian, archivist, literary historian, and leader of the Swedish temperance movement who formed the first organised temperance society in Sweden.

== Biography ==
=== Upbringing and education ===
Peter Wieselgren was born 1 October 1800 in Vislanda Parish in Småland. The name Peter is said to have arisen after the priest Peter Hyltenius misheard; he should have been named Pehr. The latter name was also the one he preferred to use.

When Wieselgren was to receive his first school certificate, at Växjö public school, Hyltenius wanted to give him the name Wieselman, because "we have branches and twigs before, but you will become a man". But his father and the headmaster preferred Wieselgren to be considered a family name after "...birth parish and older relatives", and on 5 September 1811 that name was entered in the books.

By the age of ten, he had read through the entire Bible. He also wrote a sermon at this time, as well as a small booklet of hymns. In 1819, Wieselgren went through a spiritual change of heart, and after a time of worry and sorrow over what he felt was sinful, he asked God for light and peace. Some like-minded comrades joined, and they thus formed a small society. On 24 April 24 1819, they all signed an agreement which stated, among other things, "We also renounce, though separately and without burdening the conscience of others, all use of spirituous beverages which are not beneficial to health and which may become corrupting through habit." This association, which was probably the first temperance society in Sweden, consisted of only six schoolchildren, later ten. Their meetings were held at 5 o'clock in the morning, when they could best be left alone by their mocking peers.

In 1820 Wieselgren enrolled as a student at Lund University, and that same autumn he received his first degree and after three years of intensive study received his master's degree. The following year he was appointed associate professor of literary history, and soon afterwards temporary professor of aesthetics. From 1823 to 1828 he stayed in Stockholm, where he made many friends. In 1828 he became a temporary deputy librarian at the university library in Lund and was promoted to deputy librarian in 1830. In 1829, he met missionary Peter Fjellstedt; the two became friends.

=== Work as a priest and in the temperance movement ===
Wieselgren was ordained a priest in 1833 and became the vicar of Västerstad parish in Scania the same year, where he took up his post in 1834 and became provost the same year. He founded the Västerstad temperance society there, which, after a year's work, held a celebration at which 100 farmers took a vow of sobriety. After three years, membership had reached 1,600, and by then 200 farmers had stopped distilling spirits. When Wieselgren moved from Västerstad after 15 years to take up the post of vicar in Helsingborg, it was said of him that "he had received the parish neglected like a wilderness, but left it like a well-tended herb garden". Wieselgren married Matilda Catharina Rosenquist (1816–1894), daughter of Magnus Rosenquist, the inspector at Löberöd, and Hedvig Maria née Gullander, a priest's daughter, on 14 March 1833 at Mariannetorp in Gudmuntorp.

During the first decades of the 19th century, the consumption of spirits increased considerably in Sweden as a result of domestic distilling. According to a widespread but dubious estimate, in 1829 it amounted to 45 litres per inhabitant per year – compared to about five litres in 1990.

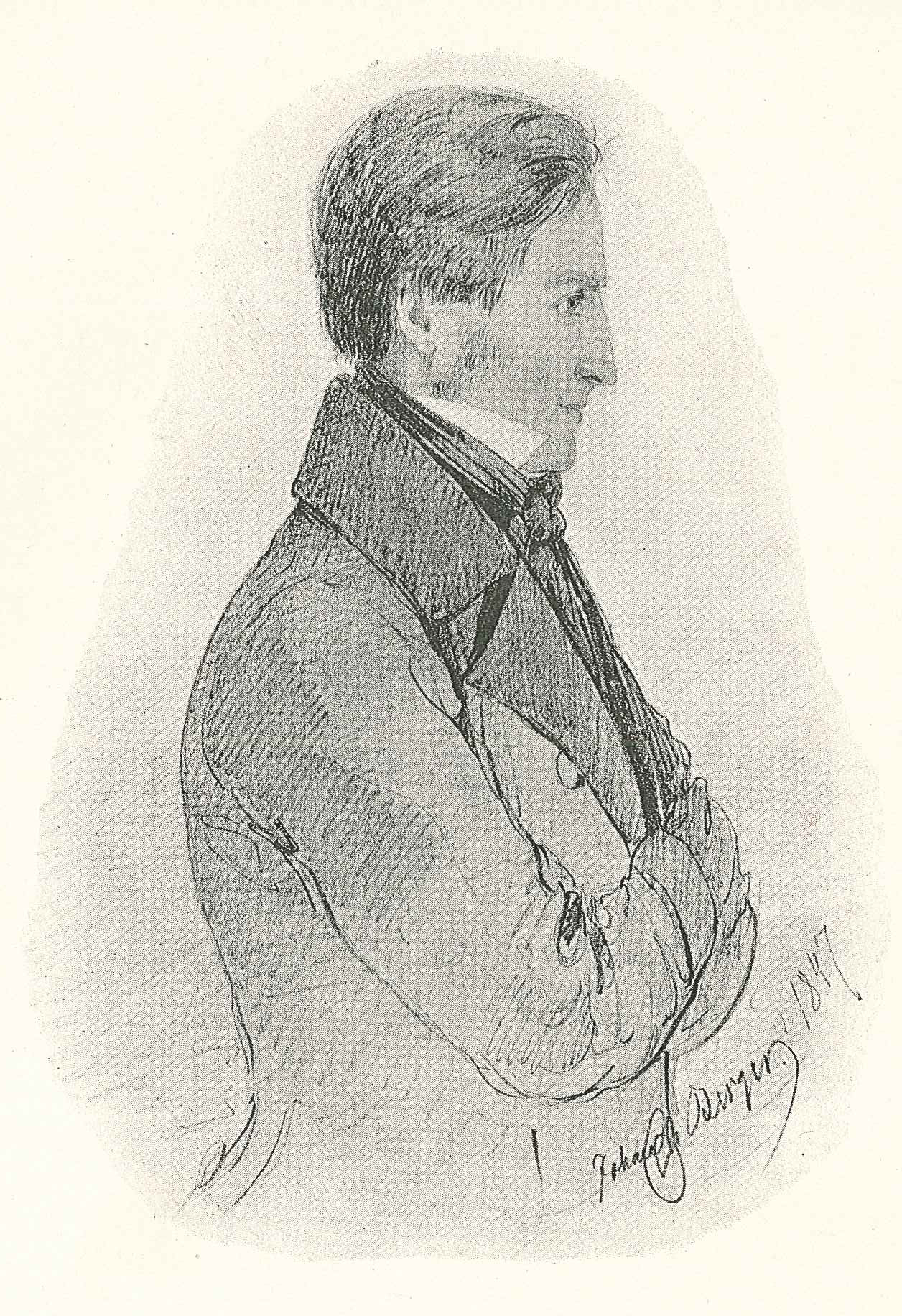
Peter Wieselgren drawn by Johan Christian Berger in 1847.

In the late 1820s, the priest Carl Emanuel Bexell had formed one of Sweden's first temperance societies in Rydaholm, Småland, and subsequently several others. Wieselgren and Bexell would later collaborate in spreading the cause of sobriety. The steamship builder Samuel Owen also started a temperance society, following the English model, and in connection with the millennium celebrations of Ansgar's missionary journey to Sweden, several temperance societies were founded in 1832. The movement developed into two branches – one absolutist and one temperance.

Wieselgren became a prominent traveling speaker for the Svenska nykterhetssällskapet (the Swedish Temperance Society). His son, Sigfrid, would become a key figure in the organization. He began to publish material on the temperance issue, including the 1837 work Hwad skall man säga om detta nykterhetswäsen, ifall man annars tror Guds ord? ('What shall we say of this sobriety activity, if we believe the word of God?') Wieselgren worked with American temperance activist Robert Baird during Baird's trip to Sweden in 1840.

Wieselgren was not an absolutist, although he has been interpreted as such. In the statutes of an association, he wrote that members could "consume fermented beverages in moderation". On the occasion of the inauguration of the Western Main Line on 4–5 November 1862 in Gothenburg, Charles XV once wanted to toast with him, but even then he would not pour wine into his goblet. When the king remarked, "The glass is empty," Wieselgren replied, "Yes, Your Majesty, but my heart is full." Inspired by Gothicism and Småland Rudbeckianism, Wieselgren subscribed to the notion that Homer's Troy should be set in the fortress Hönshylte skans in Urshults parish in Småland.

=== Later life ===
He stayed in contact with Pietist priest Peter Lorenz Sellergren toward the end of Sellergren's life. Wieselgren became vicar of Helsingborg in 1847 and was appointed dean of Gothenburg on 31 March 1857. He worked together there with Peter Fjellstedt for several years. In Gothenburg he lived in the dean's house at the corner of Korsgatan 22/Vallgatan 28.

Wieselgren died 10 October 1877 in Gothenburg and was buried by Fjellstedt at Stampen Cemetery.

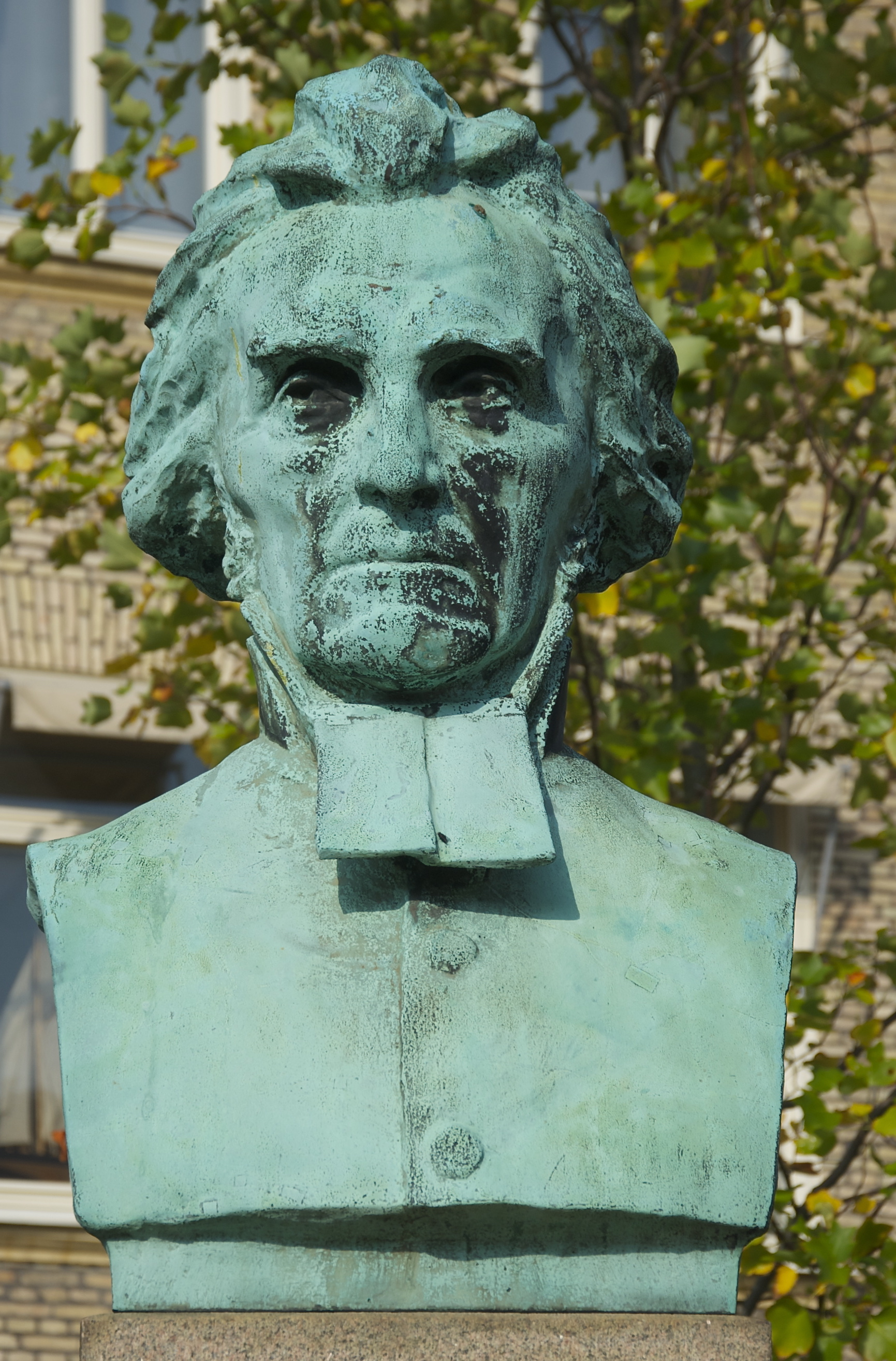
Bronze bust of Peter Wieselgren in the cathedral square at Gothenburg Cathedral. Made by Bror Chronander and unveiled by Professor Waldemar Rudin on 1 October 1910 on the 110th anniversary of Wieselgren's birth. This was then the fourth memorial in the country to him.

Wieselgrensplatsen in Gothenburg and Wieselgrensskolan in Helsingborg are named after him.

== Family ==
His parents were farmer Jonas Jonsson in Tubbamåla (1765–1849) and Elin née Ingemarsdotter (1779–1841, of the Wiesel family), whose mother Märta (1745–1792) belonged to the Spånhus family. This Wieselgren family comes from Erengislegården (Gunnarås) in Västra Torsås parish in Kronoberg County, where the progenitor Måns Olufsson lived during the 17th century.

Wieselgren was the father of librarian Harald Wieselgren and politician Sigfrid Wieselgren, as well as Hedvig Eleonora (1834–1837), Sigfrid Nathanael (1837–1839), Hedvig (1839–1863), Emma (1841–1886), Linnea (1843–1858), Ida (1846–1871, mother-in-law of priest John Pontén and grandmother of priest Gustaf Pontén and doctor Johan Pontén), Gerda (1848–1857) and priest Magnus Wieselgren (1852–1933).

== Memorials and busts ==
- On 18 September 1880, a memorial stone to the son of Spånhult, a 4.5-metre-high granite block from Ulvö in Västra Torsås parish, was unveiled at a site near Spånhult, just off the Vislanda-Bolmen railway line. One of Wieselgren's admirers, railway builder Captain Erik Sandell, had the stone erected, and Gunnar Wennerberg, then governor of Kronoberg County, gave a speech at the unveiling.
- A bronze bust was erected in 1910 at the Royal Library in Humlegården, Stockholm, created by Gustaf Malmquist.
- Another bronze bust has stood since 1910 outside Gothenburg Cathedral. It was created by Bror Chronander.

== Awards ==
- Swedish Academy's Royal Award, 1863
