= Samuel Owen (engineer) =

British-Swedish engineer, inventor and industrialist

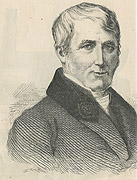
- Samuel Owen, circa 1820-30
- Born: 12 May 1774; Norton in Hales, Shropshire, England
- Died: 15 February 1854 (aged 79); Stockholm, Sweden
- Occupation: Engineer • inventor • industrialist
- Spouse(s): Ann Spen Toft Beata Carolina Svedell (m. 1817; died 1822) Johanna Magdalena Elisabeth
- Children: 17

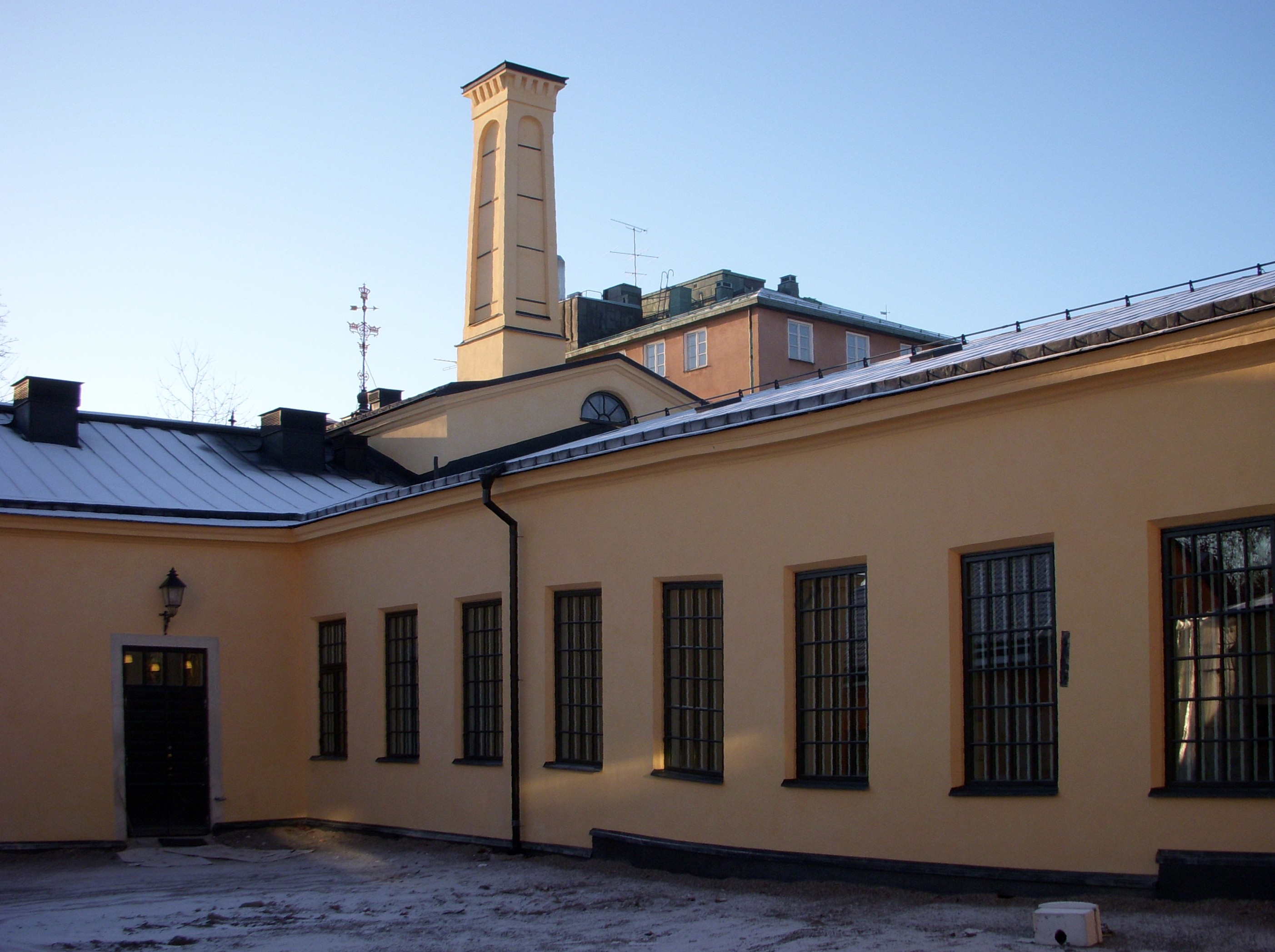
Some of Owen's original workshop buildings in Stockholm, photographed in 2009

Samuel Owen (12 May 1774 – 15 February 1854), was a British-Swedish engineer, inventor and industrialist. He founded a workshop in Stockholm in 1809 that produced a large number of mechanical components, and since then has been regarded as "the founder of the Swedish mechanical industry".

== Early and personal life ==
Owen was born in Norton in Hales, Shropshire, England on 12 May 1774.

He was married three times; first in England to Ann Spen Toft, then in Sweden in 1817 to Beata Carolina Svedell. Svedell died in 1822. Soon after, Owen married Johanna Magdalena Elisabeth (1797–1880), also called "Lisette" (likely a children's name for Elizabeth). She was born "Strindberg" and her nephew was the playwright August Strindberg. In total Owen had 17 children with his three wives.

== Career ==
Owen's first visit to Sweden was in 1804 to assist with the installation of four steam engines that had been sold by the company Fenton, Murray & Wood’s in Leeds, England that Owen was employed by at that time. The steam engines were ordered from Sweden and intended for industrial use. The first engine was installed in the autumn of 1804 in a textile factory at Lidingö outside Stockholm to replace horses that were used to drive the machines in the factory. After the installation work ended he went back to England but was asked to return in 1806 to help in setting up another engine. In 1807 Owen decided to stay in Sweden and in 1809 he opened his own workshop, Kungsholmens Mekaniska Verkstad, situated at Kungsholmen in Stockholm. Two of the original buildings that formed the workshop still remain.

Owen was also engaged in the development of steam engine-driven ships and was the first person in Sweden to build a ship with a steam engine. His first ship was called Amphitrite, built in 1818 at his shipyard close to the workshop; it had a 6 horsepower steam engine. His new steam ship was a sensation for the people around the waters around Stockholm but many were also skeptical of the new "fire and air engines" that required a lot of wood for the steam boiler. Owen also carried out tests with early types of propeller. In July 1816 he presented the first propeller-driven steamship The Witch of Stockholm. These early propeller designs, however, required many years before they came into practical use; the steamships around that time were normally driven by paddle wheels.

Owen became one of the most recognised engineers and industrialists in Sweden. He was elected a member of the Royal Swedish Academy of Sciences in 1831. Together with Methodist missionary George Scott, who was initially sent to Stockholm as a preacher for the British workers in Owen's factory, he founded one of the first Swedish temperance societies (Kungsholmens Nykterhetsförening) in 1832. In 1837, along with Scott, Bengt Franc-Sparre, August von Hartmansdorff, Jöns Jacob Berzelius, Anders Retzius, and others, he founded the Svenska nykterhetssällskapet (the Swedish Temperance Society), of which he was a board member. The organisation would reach over 100,000 members in the 1840s. His success ended in 1843 when he faced severe financial problems. His company was sold the year after, and he almost faced bankruptcy. The Swedish Government decided to give him a lifetime pension with the motivation that he had made many important contributions to the development of industries in Sweden. However, Owen continued to work, and was employed for a further number of years at a company in Södertälje, Stockholm County.

== Death and legacy ==
Owen became sick in 1853 and died in 1854, aged seventy-nine, at his home in Stockholm. He was buried at Norra begravningsplatsen.

A street at Kungsholmen, close to Stockholm City Hall, is named after him: 'Samuel Owens gata'.

== Sources ==
- Article about Samuel Owen from 1889, Project Runeberg.
