= IOGT-NTO =

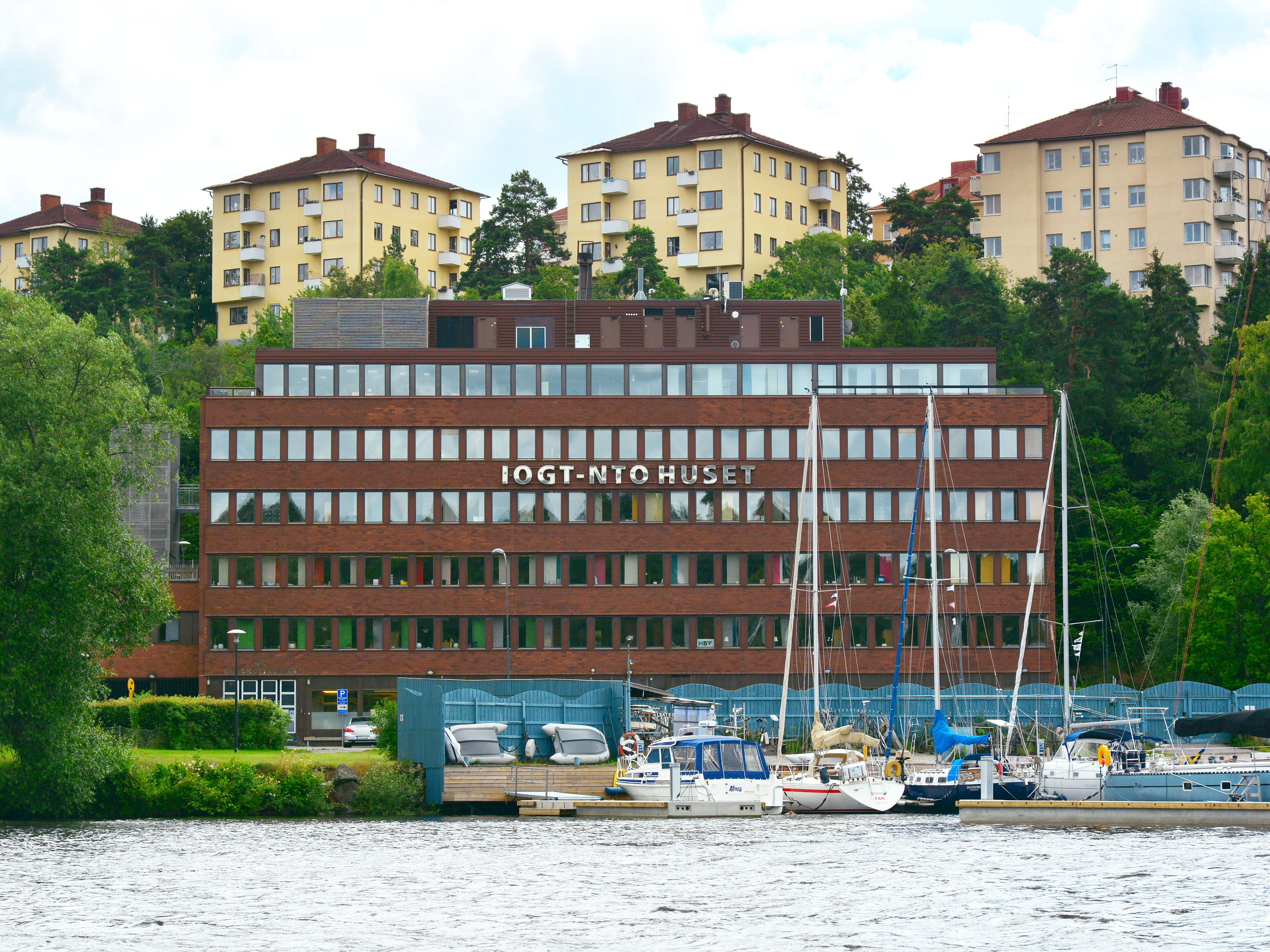
IOGT-NTO main office building at Stora Essingen in Stockholm.

IOGT-NTO is a Swedish temperance society, the Swedish branch of IOGT International. In 2007, it had approximately 46,000 members, in 1,000 local groups.

== History ==
IOGT-NTO was formed in 1970, through the merger of the Swedish chapter of IOGT with Nationaltemplarorden (NTO), a Christian Swedish temperance organisation.

IOGT was established in Sweden in 1879, when the first local chapter was started in Klippan, and was then called Godtemplarorden. In 1888, a group of people left Godtemplarorden to form another temperance order, Nationalgodtemplarorden. The latter group was merged with the Templarorden, a Swedish branch of the American organisation Templars of Temperance, in 1922, to form the NTO.

== Activities ==
IOGT-NTO works to promote total abstinence from alcohol among its members and in society. The organisation also offers a variety of study circles in various subjects, which are open to non-members.

It operates two folk high-schools, and a treatment facility for alcohol abusers.

== Youth organisations ==
The youth organisation affiliated with IOGT-NTO is Ungdomens Nykterhetsförbund, which as of 2007 had 125 local clubs. IOGT-NTO does also run an organisation for children, called Junis (the official name of Junis was originally IOGT-NTOs Juniorförbund (IOGT-NTO's Junior Association) until 2020 when Junis became the official name instead of a nickmane).

Nykterhetsrörelsens Scoutförbund (The Temperance Movement's Scouting Association) is a scouting organisation which is also part of IOGT-NTO.

== See also ==
- Svenska Sällskapet för Nykterhet och Folkuppfostran – another Swedish temperance society
