= Hans Gustav Güterbock =

German-American Hittitologist (1908–2000)

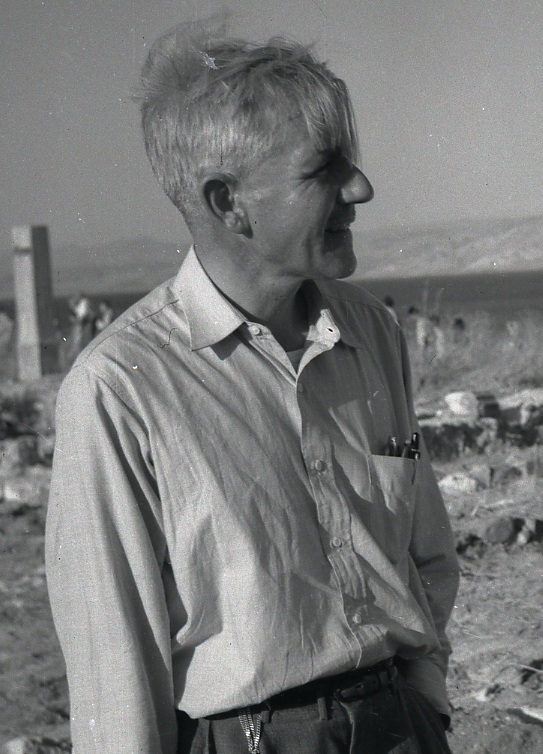
Hans Gustav Güterbock, 1952

Hans Gustav Güterbock (May 27, 1908 – March 29, 2000) was a German-American Hittitologist. Born and trained in Germany, his career was ended with the rise of the Nazis because of his Jewish heritage, and he was forced to resettle in Turkey. After the Second World War, he immigrated to the United States and spent the rest of his career at the University of Chicago.

== Early life ==
Born in Berlin to a father of Jewish heritage who served as the secretary of the Deutsche Orient-Gesellschaft, Güterbock spent a year studying the Hittite language with Hans Ehelolf before moving on to Leipzig University. There he continued his Hittite studies and took up Assyriology, studying under Johannes Friedrich and Benno Landsberger and earning a doctorate. With private funding, Güterbock managed to spend three years in Bogazköy as an epigrapher on a German team (while also employed by the Berlin Museum from 1933 to 1935), but Nazi racial laws compelled him to leave Germany and find employment at the Faculty of Languages, History, and Geography at Ankara in 1936. Güterbock, who was said to have had a native command of Turkish, was given an honorary doctorate by the University of Ankara and was also a select member of the Turkish Historical Society.

== Chicago career ==
In 1948, he left Turkey to be a guest lecturer for a year in Sweden's University of Uppsala, and in 1949 he was invited to settle at the University of Chicago's Oriental Institute by Thorkild Jacobsen. Here, he would spend the rest of his academic career. In 1956, Güterbock was promoted to a full professor, and from 1969 to his retirement in 1976 he was the university's Tiffany and Margaret Blake Distinguished Service Professor of Hittitology. In 1962, he became president of the American Oriental Society, and in 1996 would become the second person to receive the group's Medal of Merit. He was a member of both the American Academy of Arts and Sciences and the American Philosophical Society. In 1976, he joined forces with fellow Chicago professor Harry Hoffner to found and co-edit the Chicago Hittite Dictionary.

== Personal life ==
In Istanbul Güterbock married in 1940 Franziska Hellmann (1919–2014), the daughter of Karl Hellmann and Rosy, née Herzfelder. With his wife Frances he had two children: Thomas Martin and Walter Michael. His ashes are interred in the crypt of First Unitarian Church of Chicago where he was a member.

== Works ==
- Alaca Höyük civarinda ele geçen bir eti mührü. Istanbul: Devlet basimevi. 1937.
- Siegel aus Boğasköy. Berlin. 1940–42.
- Ankara Bedesteninde bulunan Eti Müzesi büyük salonunun kılavuzu. Istanbul: Millî Eğitim Basımevi. 1946.
- İstanbul Arkeoloji Müzelerinde bulunan Boǧazköy tabletleri II. Boǧazköy. Istanbul: Millî Eğitim Basımevi. 1947.
- The song of Ullikummi; revised text of the Hittite version of a Hurrian myth. New Haven: American Schools of Oriental Research. 1952.
- The Hittite dictionary of the Oriental Institute of the University of Chicago. Chicago: Oriental Institute of the University of Chicago. 1980. (edited with Harry A. Hoffner)
- Hiéroglyphes de Yazılıkaya : à propos d'un travail récent. Paris: Institut franciçais d’études anatoliennes. 1982.
- Harry A. Hoffner (1997). Perspectives on Hittite civilization : selected writings of Hans Gustav Güterbock. Chicago: Oriental Institute of the University of Chicago. ISBN 1-885923-04-X. (edited by Harry A. Hoffner)
