= Åke W. Sjöberg =

Swedish Assyriologist (1924–2014)

- Born: 1 August 1924; Sala, Sweden
- Died: 8 August 2014 (aged 90); Uppsala, Sweden
- Citizenship: Swedish
- Scientific career
- Fields: Assyriology
- Workplaces: University of Pennsylvania

Åke W. Sjöberg (August 1, 1924 – August 8, 2014) was a leading Assyriologist, specialized in Sumerian language and literature.

== Biography ==
=== Early years ===
Åke Waldemar Sjöberg, emeritus Clark Research Professor of Assyriology and emeritus Curator of the Tablet Collection at the University of Pennsylvania Museum of Archaeology and Anthropology, Philadelphia, was born in Sala in the province of Västmanland, Sweden, on August 1, 1924, to his parents, postmaster Bernhard Waldemar Sjöberg and Mary Ingeborg Zetterberg. After elementary schooling in Sala, he was able to pursue an education at Fjellstedt School, a renowned boarding school in Uppsala. The curriculum there had a heavy emphasis on the study of languages, including Latin, Greek, and Hebrew.

In 1946 he enrolled at Uppsala University to study Semitic Languages under Professor H. S. Nyberg. He also followed courses in the History of Religion, Ethnography and Assyriology. In 1953, Sjöberg married his wife Gunnil (née Kronborg). Sjöberg's interest in the cuneiform cultures of the ancient Near East, and especially the languages of Akkadian and Sumerian led him to spend eight semesters between 1953 and 1959 in Heidelberg, where he studied under Adam Falkenstein. In 1960 Sjöberg successfully defended his doctoral thesis on the Sumerian moon-god Nanna-Suen in Sumerian sources.

=== Professional career in the United States ===
A few years after his doctoral defense, he was invited to the University of Chicago, where, in January 1963, he joined the staff at the Oriental Institute, assisting in compiling the Assyrian Dictionary of the Oriental Institute of the University of Chicago (CAD). After having spent three years in Chicago, he moved on to the University of Pennsylvania in Philadelphia in 1966, where he mainly taught Akkadian classes. Two years later he succeeded Samuel Noah Kramer as Clark Research Professor in Assyriology, taking over the post as Curator of the Tablet Collections of the University Museum of Archaeology and Anthropology, working alongside his colleagues Barry Eichler and Erle Leichty.

Together with Erle Leichty, Sjöberg managed to secure funding for a dictionary of the Sumerian Language, The Pennsylvania Sumerian Dictionary (PSD). The dictionary project was based on Sjöberg's extensive collection of file cards containing lexicographic information on Sumerian words and expressions, on which he had been working since his days as a student. The main work on the project began in 1976. The main sponsor was the National Endowment for the Humanities, but contributions also came from other institutions and individuals. Between 1984 and 1998, four volumes of the dictionary were published, covering the letters A and B. A large measure of inspiration for this project can be ascribed to Sjöberg's days in Chicago, as a contributor to the Assyrian Dictionary.

Sjöberg received a number of honours. Among them, an honorary doctorate in theology at Uppsala University in 1994, and in 2005 he was elected member of the Honorary Council of the International Association for Assyriology. In 2010, having held his doctorate for 50 years, he became a jubilee doctor at the Uppsala University spring doctoral promotions ceremony. He has had two Festschrift volumes published in his honour, the first to celebrate his 65th birthday in 1989; the second was published in 2013 (see Selected writings for both of them). He was also an elected member of the American Philosophical Society.

Åke Sjöberg's high standards of philological treatments of literary and religious texts, and his lexicographical expertise in Sumerian are widely acknowledged. Apart from his dissertation and the four volumes of the PSD, he published a monograph treating the collection of Sumerian Temple Hymns (based on notes and copies of Eugen Bergmann, with a chapter by Gene Gragg), and scores of academic articles in English, German and Swedish, treating a wide variety of linguistic and cultural matters related to Near Eastern societies.

=== Return to Sweden ===
Åke Sjöberg's retirement in 1996 did not lead to his work coming to a halt; something that his long list of publications attests to. In early 2004 he and his wife Gunnil moved back to Uppsala. Despite his age Sjöberg regularly participated in seminars at Uppsala University, sharing his experiences and knowledge to younger generations of scholars and students.

Sjöberg died in Uppsala, Sweden, on 8 August 2014, one week after his ninetieth birthday.

== Selected writings ==
- Behrens, Hermann; Loding, Darlene; Roth, Martha Tobi (1989), "DUMU-E2-DUB-BA-A: Studies in Honor of Åke W. Sjöberg", Occasional Publications of the Samuel Noah Kramer Fund 9, Philadelphia: The University of Pennsylvania Museum
- Sjöberg, Åke W. (1960), Der Mondgott Nanna-Suen in der sumerischen Überlieferung, Stockholm: Almqvist & Wiksell
- Sjöberg, Åke W.; Bergmann, Eugen (1969), The Collection of the Sumerian Temple Hymns, Locust Valley, New York: J.J. Augustin, pp. 3–154
- Sjöberg, Åke W.; et al. (1984–1998), The Sumerian Dictionary of The University Museum of The University of Pennsylvania, 4 Volumes (B, A/1, A/2, A/3)., Philadelphia: The Babylonian Section of the University Museum.
- Sassmannshausen, L. (2013), He Has Opened Nisaba's House of Learning: Studies in Honor of Åke Waldemar Sjöberg on the Occasion of His 89th Birthday on August 1st 2013. Cuneiform Monographs 46, Leiden: Brill
