= Muazzez İlmiye Çığ =

Turkish librarian, writer, and supercentenarian (1914–2024)

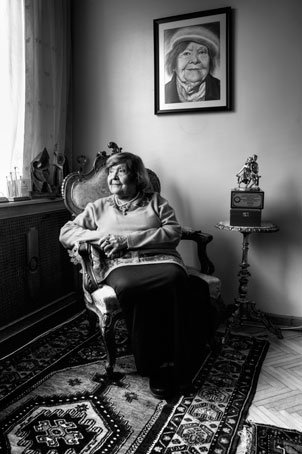
- Çığ in 2010
- Born: Muazzez İlmiye İtil; 20 June 1914; Bursa, Ottoman Empire
- Died: 17 November 2024 (aged 110 years, 150 days); Mersin, Turkey
- Education: Ankara University
- Occupations: Archaeologist, sumerologist, assyriologist, writer
- Spouse: M. Kemal Çığ

Muazzez İlmiye Çığ (née İtil; 20 June 1914 – 17 November 2024) was a Turkish archeologist, librarian, writer, and supercentenarian who specialised in the study of Hittites and Sumerian civilization.

== Early life ==
Çığ's parents were Crimean Tatars both of whose families had immigrated to Turkey, with her father's side settling in the town of Merzifon, and her mother's side in the northwestern city of Bursa, Turkey's fourth-largest, which was, at the time, a major regional administrative center of the Ottoman Empire.

Çığ was born Muazzez İlmiye İtil in Bursa, a few weeks before the outbreak of World War I and, by the time of her fifth birthday in 1919, the Greek Army's invasion of İzmir prompted her father, who was a teacher, to seek safety for the family by moving to the city of Çorum where young Muazzez completed her primary studies. She subsequently returned to Bursa and, by the time of her 17th birthday in 1931, graduated from its training facility for elementary school teachers.

== Educational credentials ==
After nearly five years of educating children in another northwestern city, Eskişehir, Çığ began studies in 1936 at Ankara University's Department of Hittitology. Among her teachers were two of the period's most eminent scholars of Hittite culture and history, Hans Gustav Güterbock and Benno Landsberger, both Hitler-era German-Jewish refugees, who spent World War II as professors in Turkey.

Upon receiving her degree in 1940, Çığ began a multi-decade career at Museum of the Ancient Orient, one of three such institutions comprising Istanbul Archaeology Museums, as a resident specialist in the field of cuneiform tablets, thousands of which were being stored untranslated and unclassified in the facility's archives. In the intervening years, due to her efforts in the deciphering and publication of the tablets, the Museum became a Middle Eastern languages learning center attended by ancient history researchers from every part of the world.

== Professional career ==
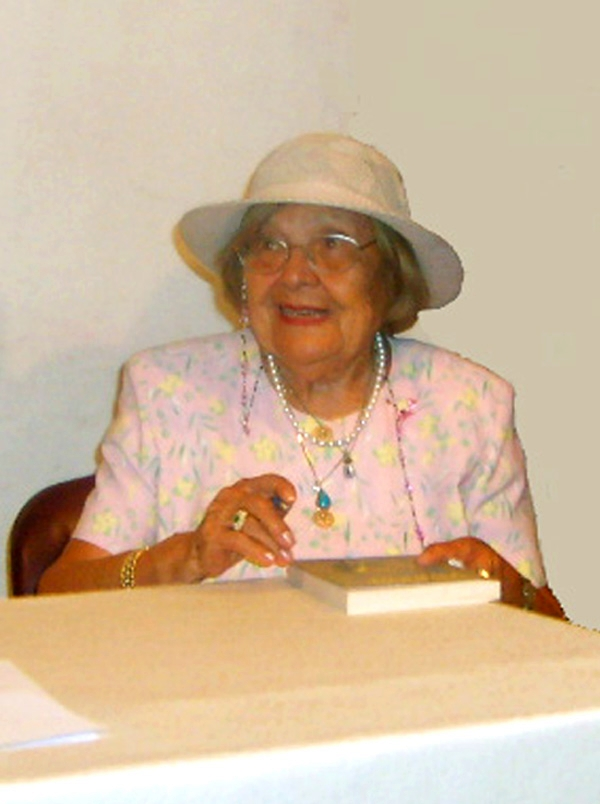
İlmiye Çığ in Mersin

Married to M. Kemal Çığ, the director of Topkapı Museum, Çığ became a prominent advocate for secularism and women's rights in Turkey, and an honorary member of German Archeology Institute and İstanbul University Institute of Prehistoric Sciences. She has gained renown in her profession for the diligent and systematic investigation evident in her books, scholarly papers and general interest articles published in magazines and newspapers such as Belleten and Bilim ve Ütopya. In 2002, her autobiography, Çivi Çiviyi Söker, framed as a series of interviews by journalist Serhat Öztürk was published by the Türkiye İş Bankası publishing house.

Together with his colleagues Hatice Kızılyay and Fritz Rudolf Kraus, she cleaned, classified and numbered thousands of tablets written in Sumerian, Akkadian and Hittite languages in the museum's warehouse. Çığ created an archive of cuneiform documents consisting of 74,000 tablets and copied and catalogued 3,000 tablets. In the intervening years, thanks to her efforts in deciphering and publishing the tablets, the museum has become a center for the study of Middle Eastern languages, a place of reference for ancient history researchers from all over the world.

In 1957, she attended the Congress of Orientalists in Munich. In 1960, she spent 6 months at the University of Heidelberg. In 1965, she took part in the relocation of the Hittite exhibition in Rome to London. She retired in 1972.

Çığ, who lived abroad for a while after her retirement, attended the Asurology congress in Philadelphia in 1988. She translated Samuel Noah Kramer's History Begins at Sumer into Turkish. In 1990, it was published by the Turkish Historical Society under the title History Begins at Sumer.

As the book attracted much attention, she wrote 13 books on Sumerian and Hittite cultures in 1993. One of them is the book she wrote for children, Journey to Sumer through the Time Tunnel.

== Controversies ==
=== Allegations of participation in torture ===
Muazzez İlmiye Çığ's brother, Turan İtil was a psychiatrist worked at the University of Missouri, on LSD, a psychedelic drug. In the 1970s, İtil returned to Turkey and founded the HZİ Foundation with his sister in 1971. Çığ became the president of the foundation and was mostly involved in the administration of the foundation.

In 1984, Nokta magazine claimed that Turan İtil tortured the prisoners by using experimental drugs who were convicted due to their participation in the 1970s political violence. Cumhuriyet newspaper also alleged that some employees of Topkapı Museum which Çığ's husband was director of, were also used as test subjects. Çığ, İtil claimed that experiments were done voluntarily and conducted to profile the terrorists with the permission of the Military Junta under the HZİ Foundation's supervision.

The foundation sank into obscurity and formally dissolved in 2011. Although some inquiries were made, no one from the foundation was prosecuted. It is unknown how much Cığ knew about the alleged torture in her official capacity. After Çığ's death, torture allegations were revived again.

=== Headscarf case ===
In her books in 2000s, Çığ argued that the headscarf worn by Muslim women did not originate in the Muslim world, but was purportedly worn five thousand years earlier by Sumerian priestesses as a means of initiating young men into sex. This stirred controversy in the Muslim world and received worldwide media coverage. Eventually, she and her publisher were charged with "inciting hatred based on religious differences". On 31 October 2006, in the first hearing of the case, charges were dismissed and her acquittal brought additional publicity to Çığ. In her trial, she denied the charges, declaring "I am a woman of science ... I never insulted anyone". At that initial trial hearing, the judge dismissed her case and, following a trial less than half hour in duration, the book's publisher was acquitted too.

== Later life and death ==
Çığ turned 100 on 20 June 2014, and 110 on 20 June 2024. She died on 17 November 2024, at the age of 110 years and 150 days. She was the oldest verified person in Turkey at the time of her death.

== Partial bibliography ==
- 1993: Zaman Tüneli ile Sümer'e Yolculuk [Journey to Sumer through a Time Tunnel] (written as children's educational literature)
- 1995: Kur'an, İncil ve Tevrat'ın Sümer'deki Kökeni [The Origins of the Koran, the Gospel and the Torah in Sumer]
- 1996: Sümerli Ludingirra [Ludingirra the Sumerian, a retrospective science-fiction] (İbrahim Peygamber)
- 1997: The Prophet Abram, According to Sumerian Writings and Archeological Findings
- 1998: İnanna'nın Aşkı [The Love of Inanna, the Belief and the Holy Marriage in Sumer]
- 2000: Hititler ve Hattuşa [The Hittites and Hattuša, as Written by Ishtar]
- 2002: Ortadoğu Uygarlık Mirası [Civilization Heritage in the Middle East]
- 2005: Bereket Kültü ve Mabet Fahişeliği [Cult of Fertility and Holy Prostitution]

Works include numerous translations from English.
