= J. H. Johnson =

J. H. Johnson may refer to:

- Janet Johnson (Egyptologist), born 1944
- J. H. Johnson (politician), 19th century Mississippi legislator
