= Adolf Leo Oppenheim =

Austrian-American Assyriologist (1904–1974)

- Born: 7 June 1904; Vienna, Austro-Hungarian Empire (now Austria)
- Died: 21 July 1974 (aged 70); Berkeley, California, United States
- Citizenship: American
- Education: University of Vienna (PhD)
- Occupation: Assyriologist
- Employer: University of Chicago (Oriental Institute)

Adolf Leo Oppenheim (7 June 1904 – 21 July 1974) was an Austrian-American Assyriologist. He was editor-in-charge of the Chicago Assyrian Dictionary of the Oriental Institute from 1955 to 1974 and the John A. Wilson Professor of Oriental Studies at the University of Chicago.

Oppenheim was born in Vienna, Austria-Hungary, where he received his PhD at the University of Vienna in 1933. His parents died in the Holocaust, which his wife Elizabeth survived. The couple then emigrated to the United States in 1941, and after a few stagnant years, he became a research associate at the University of Chicago in 1947 and was made a faculty member in 1950. He became an associate editor of the university's Chicago Assyrian Dictionary in 1952. The dictionary had been planned since 1921, and it would eventually stretch to more than 20 published volumes. Assisted by Hungarian-American Assyriologist Erica Reiner, Oppenheim remained editor-in-charge until his sudden death in 1974.

Polish-American Assyriologist Ephraim Avigdor Speiser claimed that Oppenheim had read more cuneiform than any other living person; his deep knowledge of Akkadian informed his discerning view of daily life and culture in Mesopotamia. He also collaborated with French Assyriologist Jeanne-Marie Aynard on the interpretation of dreams in the ancient Near East.

Oppenheim's most famous work is Ancient Mesopotamia: Portrait of a Dead Civilization, first published in 1964. His attempt to reform the field, embodied in Assyriology— Why and How? (1960), was taken personally by a number of other Assyriologists. Its tone of pessimism at the impossible prospect of reviving a living understanding of Mesopotamian culture belied his personal optimism and sociability.

== See also ==
- List of Assyriologists

== Published works ==
- Untersuchungen zum babylonischen Mietrecht. Vienna (Wien): Selbstverlag des Orientalischen Institutes der Universität. 1936.
- The Interpretation of Dreams in the Ancient Near East. Gorgias Press. 1956. ISBN 9781593337339.
- Ancient Mesopotamia: Portrait of a Dead Civilization. Chicago: University of Chicago Press. 1964. (reprint ISBN 0-226-63186-9)
- Letters from Mesopotamia. Chicago: University of Chicago Press. 1967.
- Essays on Mesopotamian Civilization: Selected Papers of A. Leo Oppenheim. Chicago: University of Chicago Press. 1974. (edited by Erica Reiner and Johannes Renger)
- Glass and Glassmaking in Ancient Mesopotamia. London: Associated University Presses. 1988. ISBN 0-87290-058-4.
- Oppenheim, A.L (1985). "The Babylonian Evidence of Achaemenian Rule in Mesopotamia". In Ilya Gershevitch (ed.). The Cambridge History of Iran. Cambridge University Press. ISBN 9781139054935.
