= Fjellstedt School =

Former private boarding school in Uppsala, Sweden

Fjellstedt School Fjellstedtska skolan
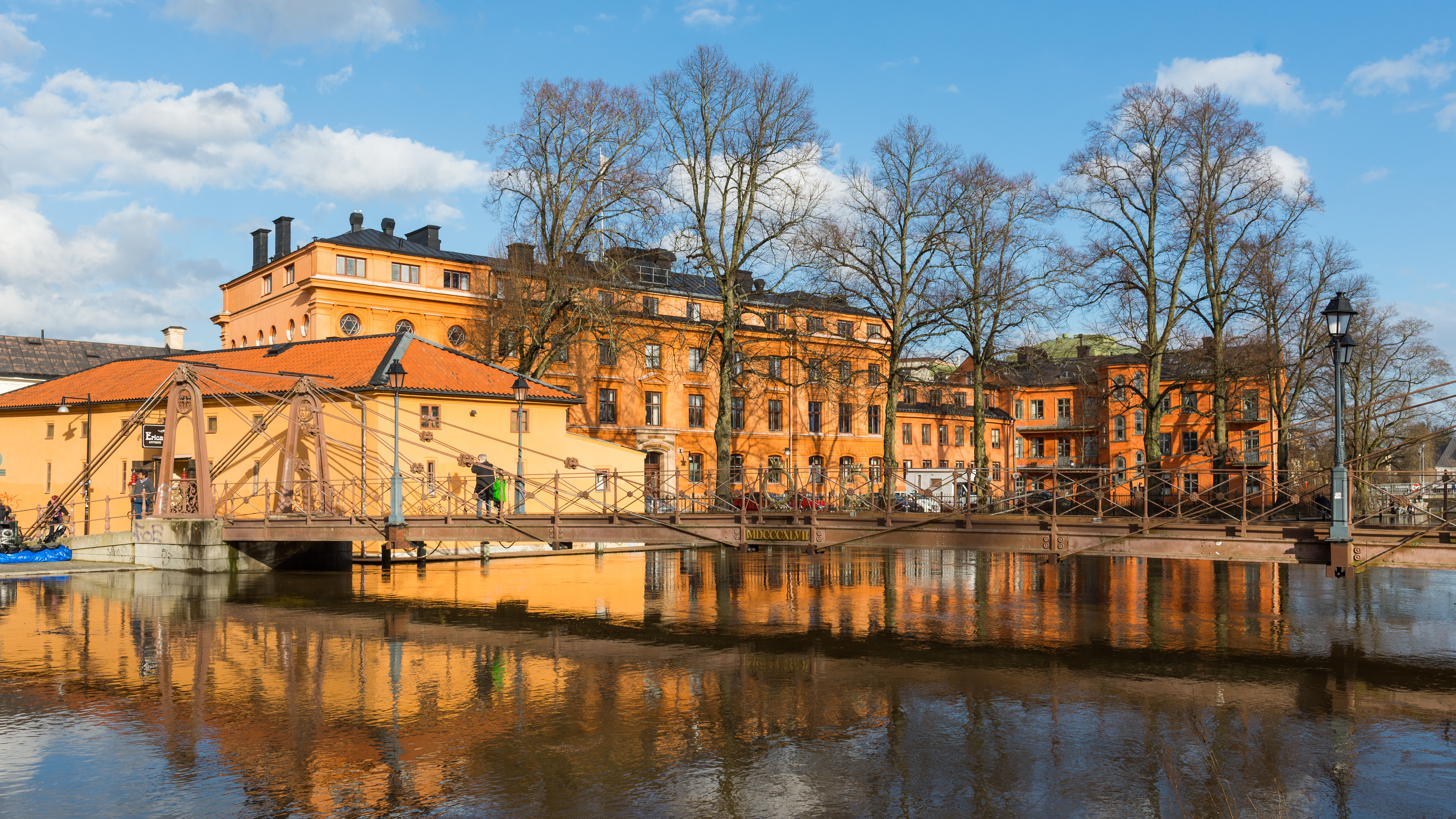

Location
- Uppsala; Sweden
- Coordinates: 59°51′38.79″N 17°37′59.33″E

Information
- Religious affiliation(s): Church of Sweden
- Established: 1862
- Closed: 1982

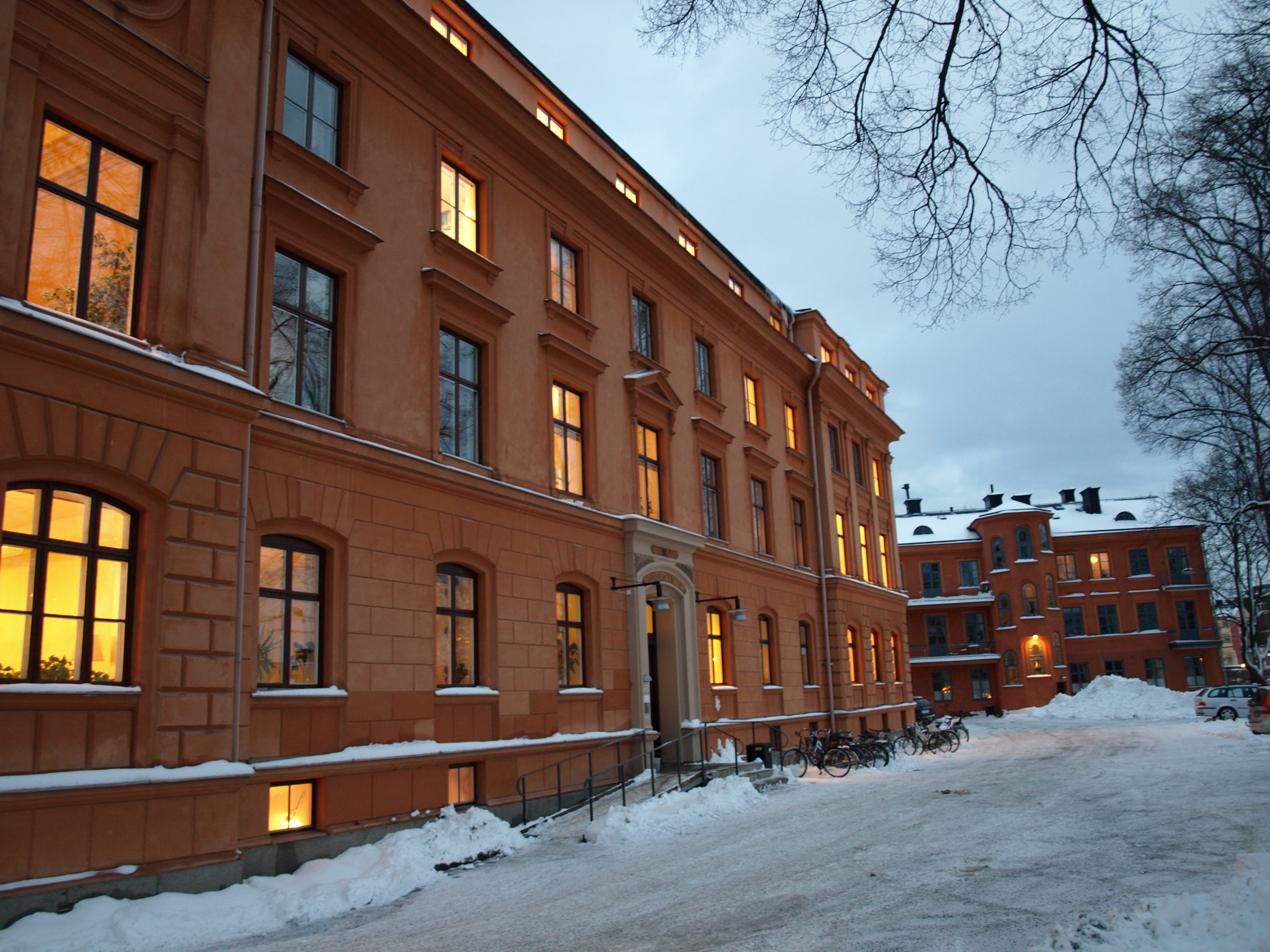
Fjellstedt School, November 2008.

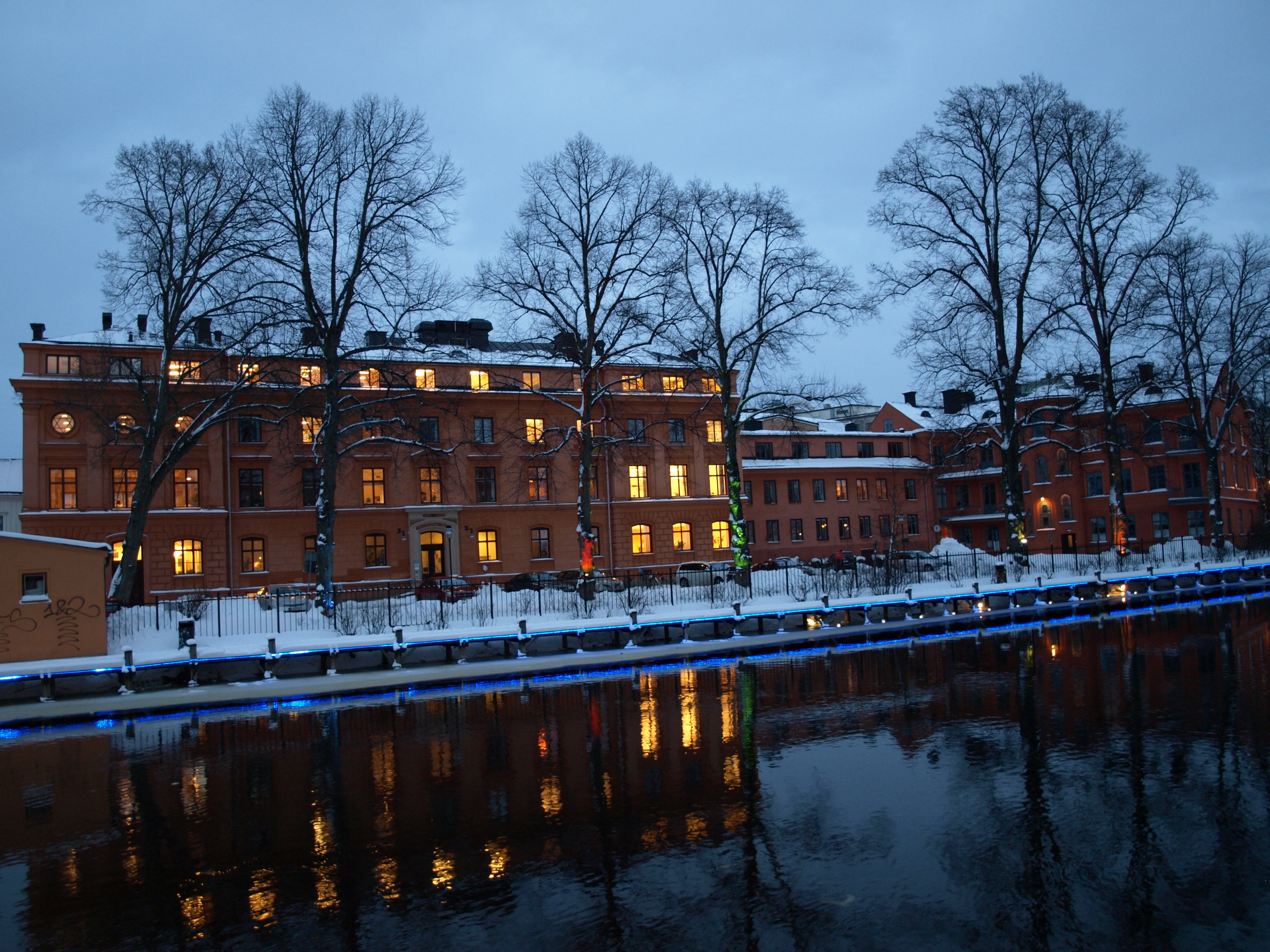
Fjellstedt School from the west side of the Fyris River in November 2008.

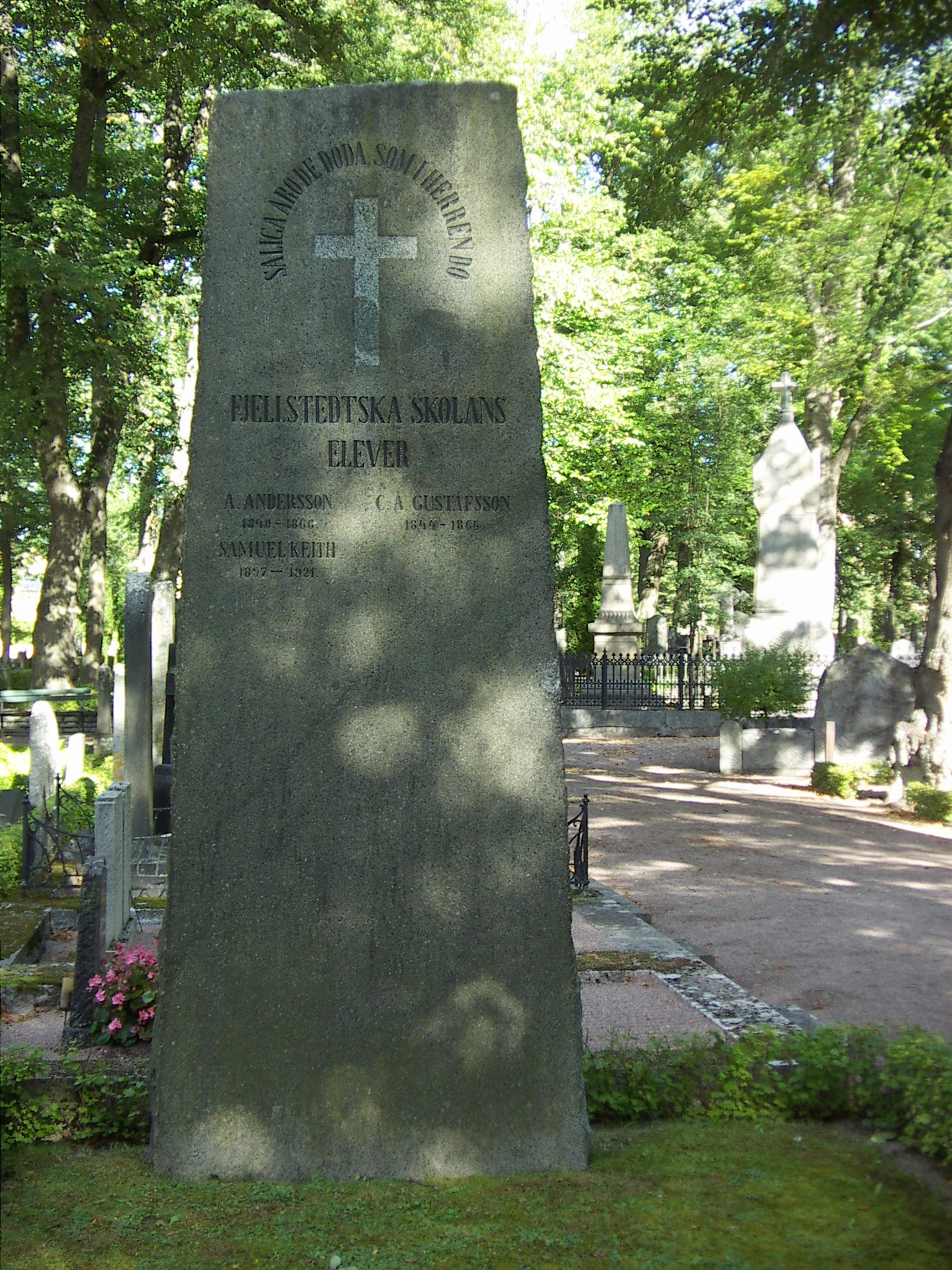
Fjellstedt School memorial at Uppsala old cemetery.

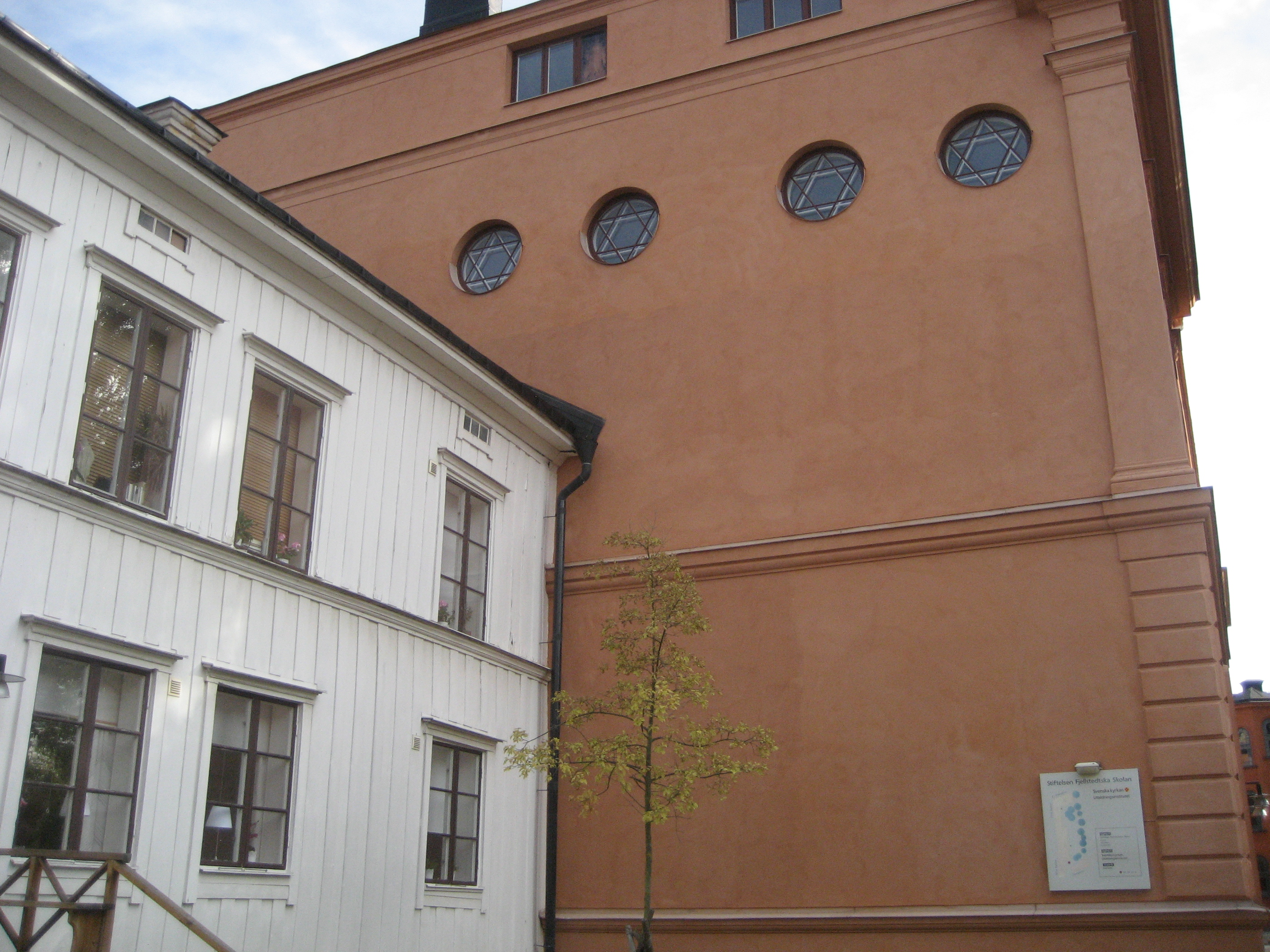
Six-pointed star in the windows of the northern gable at Linnégatan 1.

The Fjellstedt School (Swedish: Fjellstedtska skolan) was a private boarding school in Uppsala, Sweden, founded in 1862 and closed in 1982, with the main aim of preparing students for academic studies in theology and the priesthood in the Lutheran Church of Sweden.

The Fjellstedt School Foundation (Stiftelsen Fjellstedtska skolan) has been a theological training and course institute since 1982. The foundation owns a large property between the Fyris River and Östra Ågatan in central Uppsala, where, in addition to the foundation's activities, there are also premises for the Church of Sweden's educational institute.

== History ==
The school has its origins in the work of priest and missionary Peter Fjellstedt (1802–1881). In 1845, money was gathered to support him and his family by enabling him to preach, establishing the Lund Missionary Society, where he became director in 1846. He and several theology professors at Uppsala University wanted to promote theological education. Bishops Henrik Reuterdahl, Ebbe Gustaf Bring and priests Johan Henrik Thomander, Peter Wieselgren, and Paul Gabriel Ahnfelt were some of the clergy involved in the early organization. Its first two students in the 1840s were some of the first Swedish missionaries to China, Carl Joseph Fast and Anders Elgqvist. The institute moved first to Stockholm in 1856 and later to Uppsala in 1859, where it was renamed in 1862 and became a school for future priests: the Fjellstedt School.

The school had its own curricula with a strong focus on classical languages. In addition to modern languages, Latin was taught in five of the seven years, starting in the third year of real school, and Greek was taught for four years. These languages also had more weekly hours than in other schools in the country. From 1914, the school had compulsory Hebrew lessons in the two highest years. In 1966, the focus was broadened and a degree was established to prepare for overseas service. It included the teaching of a non-European language, such as Swahili. A church music degree was established in 1977.

The conditions at the school, with the older humanities degree, led to a one-year delay in the abolition of the traditional studentexamen. By decision of the king, the last studentexam took place at the Fjellstedt School in 1969. Approximately 1,650 students graduated from Fjellstedtska School until the school ceased operations in 1982. Until 1939, students had to submit an explicit declaration of intent to become a priest in their application.

The Fjellstedt School Foundation now sees its task as strengthening the identity of priests and future priests – on the basis of the church's faith, confession and doctrine – in their mission as liturgists, preachers and pastors with an integrated personal Christian faith, and to work for increased knowledge and understanding of different religious orientations, theological interpretations and expressions of Christian faith within the Church of Sweden and the worldwide church. Every year, some ten courses are organized in the fields of church services, pastoral care, diaconia and international activities.

== Associated people and influence ==
A number of well-known priests, including 25 from the Lutheran Augustana Synod, attended the Fjellstedt School. Scholar Conrad Bergendorff notes, "It would be no exaggeration to say that the Fjellstedt influence was a predominant one in the development of the character of Swedish Lutheranism in the United States."

=== Notable instructors ===
- Carl Axel Brolén (1845–1939), Latinist, taught 1911–1925
- Thore Christian Elias Fries (1886–1930), botanist, taught 1911–1913
- Salomon Eberhard Hanschen (1847–1930), neurologist, taught 1870–1873
- Frans Reinhold Kjellman (1846–1907), botanist, taught 1872–1878
- Henrik Samuel Nyberg (1889–1974), expert in Iranology and Arab studies, taught 1916–1927

=== Notable students ===
- Nicolaus Bergensköld (1838–1907), clergyman
- John Elof Boodin (1869–1950), philosopher
- Olof Olsson (1841–1900), clergyman
- Åke W. Sjöberg (1924–2014), Assyriologist

=== Rectors ===
- 1862–1866: Ulrik Mikael Lundgren
- 1866–1870: Nils Linnarsson
- 1870–1920: Johannes Kerfstedt
- 1920–1936: Gustaf Norrman
- 1936–1963: Georg Landberg
- 1963–1982: Allan Parkman

=== Directors ===
- 1920–1928: Adolf Kolmodin
- 1929–1930: Gustaf Ljunggren
- 1930–1936: Torsten Ysander
- 1936–1944: Yngve Rudberg
- 1945–1958: Ruben Josefson
- 1982–1993: Allan Parkman
- 1994–2011: Per Hansson
- 2011– Leif Nordenstorm

== See also ==
- Johannelunds Teologiska Högskola
