= CHD =

CHD may refer to:

== Education ==
- Chang'an University, a public university in Xi'an, Shaanxi, China

== Medicine ==
- Compulsive Hoarding Disorder
- Congenital heart defect
- Coronary heart disease

== Organizations ==
- Church and Dwight, US household product manufacturer, NYSE symbol
- Children's Health Defense

== Transportation ==
- Russian Air Force, ICAO code
- Changi Depot, Singapore, MRT depot code
- Chesterfield railway station, England, National Rail code
- Chandler Municipal Airport, Arizona, USA, FAA LID

== Technology ==
- Compressed Hunks of Data, a file format used by the MAME emulator

== Other ==
- Chad, UNDP country code
- Chicago Hittite Dictionary, Oriental Institute of the University of Chicago
- Chandigarh, a union territory of India (postal code)
