= Harry A. Hoffner =

American Hittitologist (1934–2015)

Harry Angier Hoffner Jr. (November 27, 1934 – March 10, 2015) was an American professor of Hittitology.

== Early life and education ==
Hoffner was born in Jacksonville, Florida to Harry Angier and Madaline Wolford Hoffner. He studied at Princeton University, where he earned an A.B. cum laude in 1956. Hoffner continued his studies at the Dallas Theological Seminary, obtaining a Th.M. in 1960, and then took up study at Brandeis University, earning an M.A. in 1961 and a Ph.D. in Ancient Mediterranean studies in 1963.

== Academic career ==
His first teaching post was at Illinois' Wheaton College, where he taught Hebrew and Biblical studies from 1963 to 1964. Hoffner returned to Brandeis in 1964, teaching ancient Near Eastern languages as an assistant professor of Anatolian studies. He left for Yale in 1969 to be an associate professor of Assyriology and Hittitology, and in 1974 settled at the University of Chicago's Oriental Institute as a professor of Hittitology. Hoffner continued teaching and serving as executive editor of the Chicago Hittite Dictionary until his retirement in 2000. He finished his career as the John A. Wilson Professor of Hittitology Emeritus, and also served as the senior editor of the Chicago Hittite Dictionary, which he co-founded with Hans Gustav Güterbock in 1976.

== Works ==
- The Laws of the Hittites. University Microfilms, Inc., Ann Arbor, MI. 1964.
- An English-Hittite Glossary (Revue Hittite et Asianique XXV/80). Paris: Klincksieck. 1967.
- Alimenta Hethaeorum. American Oriental Series 55. New Haven: American Oriental Society. 1974.
- Hittite Myths. Writings from the Ancient World 2. Atlanta: Scholars Press. 1990.
- The Laws of the Hittites. A Critical Edition. Documenta et Monumenta Orientis Antiqui, 23. Leiden: E. J. Brill. 1997.
- Hittite Myths. Second Edition Revised and Augmented. Writings from the Ancient World 2. Atlanta: Scholars Press. 1998. ISBN 978-0-7885-0488-4.
- Letters from the Hittite Kingdom. Writings from the Ancient World 15. Atlanta: Publisher: Society of Biblical Literature. July 5, 2009. ISBN 978-1-58983-212-1.
- Harry A. Hoffner; Hans G. Güterbock., eds. (1989). The Hittite Dictionary of the Oriental Institute of the University of Chicago. The Oriental Institute of the University of Chicago. ISBN 0-918986-26-5. Multi-volume set.
- Harry A. Hoffner Jr; H. Craig Melchert (2008). A Grammar of the Hittite Language. Winona Lake, IN: Eisenbrauns. ISBN 978-1-57506-119-1.
