= Francesca Rochberg =

American Assyriologist (born 1952)

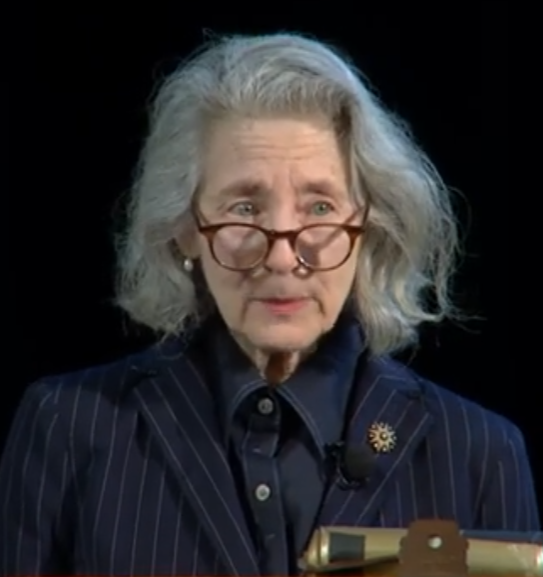
- Giving the 2023 lecture "The History and Transmission of a Babylonian Astronomical Idea"
- Born: May 8, 1952 (age 74); Philadelphia, Pennsylvania, U.S.

Academic background
- Education: University of Chicago; University of Pennsylvania

Academic work
- Discipline: Assyriology
- Institutions: University of California, Berkeley

Francesca Rochberg (born May 8, 1952) is an American Assyriologist, historian of science, and Catherine and William L. Magistretti Distinguished Professor of Near Eastern Studies Emerita at University of California, Berkeley. She is best known for her work on the history of Babylonian astronomy. Her research focuses on ancient Mesopotamian and Greco-Roman traditions in astronomy and astrology. She received a MacArthur Fellowship in 1982 and was elected to the American Philosophical Society in 2008.

== Early life and education ==
Rochberg was born in Philadelphia. Her father was the composer George Rochberg. She graduated from the University of Pennsylvania with a Bachelor of Arts in Oriental Studies in 1974 and earned a PhD in Near Eastern Languages and Civilizations from the University of Chicago in 1980. Her doctoral thesis was on the lunar eclipse tablets of the omen series Enūma Anu Enlil. Some of her early work appeared under the name Francesca Rochberg-Halton.

== Career ==
From 1976 to 1982 Rochberg was on the staff of the Chicago Assyrian Dictionary at the University of Chicago's Oriental Institute. She taught in the Department of History at the University of Notre Dame, and held fellowships at the Altorientalisches Seminar of the University of Tübingen and in the history of science at Yale University. She taught at the University of California, Riverside, where she was a professor of history. In 1996 she was the Michael Polanyi Visiting Lecturer in the History and Philosophy of Natural Science at the University of North Carolina at Chapel Hill.

At Berkeley she served as chair of the Department of Middle Eastern Languages and Cultures from 2018 to 2021. In 2018 she was a visiting scholar at the Max Planck Institute for the History of Science in Berlin. She is also a senior fellow of the Institute for the Study of the Ancient World at New York University. In 2013 she gave the Darwin College Lecture "Foresight in Ancient Mesopotamia" at the University of Cambridge. She became professor emerita at Berkeley.

== Research ==
Rochberg has published first editions of cuneiform texts and has written widely on the Babylonian celestial sciences. She has also brought cuneiform evidence into the philosophy of science, in discussions of empiricism, prediction and reasoning.

In The Heavenly Writing (2004) she used the Babylonian horoscopes to argue that celestial divination, astrology and mathematical astronomy were connected parts of one scholarly tradition, and that the divide between them is a 20th-century construction. In Before Nature (2016) she argued that although cuneiform scholars had no concept of nature, their practices belong to the history of science. In Worldmaking and Cuneiform Antiquity (2025) she argued that Babylonian astronomers saw a world made up of the distinctive elements of their own culture, and engaged with theorists of science such as Thomas Kuhn, Bruno Latour and Nelson Goodman.

In 2018 a Festschrift, The Scaffolding of Our Thoughts: Essays on Assyriology and the History of Science in Honor of Francesca Rochberg, was published by Brill.

== Awards and Positions ==
- 2025 Jacques Barzun Prize in Cultural History, American Philosophical Society, for Worldmaking and Cuneiform Antiquity
- 2022 Francis Bacon Award, California Institute of Technology; Francis Bacon Professor in the History and Philosophy of Science at Caltech, 2023
- 2010 Research Professorship LMU Munich
- 2008 Member, American Philosophical Society
- 2007 Member, Princeton, Institute for Advanced Study, School of Historical Studies
- 2006 Fellow, Magdalen College, Oxford
- 2004 Fellow, Center for Ideas and Society, University of California, Riverside
- 1999 John Frederick Lewis Award for Babylonian Horoscopes (American Philosophical Society, 1998)
- 1993-94 John Simon Guggenheim Memorial Foundation Fellowship
- 1982-1987 John D. and Catherine T. MacArthur Fellowship

== Works ==
- Francesca Rochberg-Halton, ed. (1987). Language, Literature, and History: Philological and Historical Studies Presented to Erica Reiner. American Oriental Series. Vol. 67. New Haven: American Oriental Society. ISBN 0-940490-67-6.
- Aspects of Babylonian Celestial Divination: The Lunar Eclipse Tablets of Enūma Anu Enlil. Archiv für Orientforschung, Beiheft. Vol. 22. Horn: F. Berger. 1988.
- Babylonian Horoscopes. American Philosophical Society. 1998. ISBN 978-0-87169-881-0.
- The Heavenly Writing: Divination, Horoscopy, and Astronomy in Mesopotamian Culture. Cambridge University Press. 2004. ISBN 978-0-521-83010-2.
- In the Path of the Moon: Babylonian Celestial Divination and Its Legacy. Brill. 2010. ISBN 978-90-04-18389-6.
- Before Nature: Cuneiform Knowledge and the History of Science. University of Chicago Press. 2016. ISBN 978-0226406138
- Bowen, Alan C.; Rochberg, Francesca, eds. (2020). Hellenistic Astronomy: The Science in Its Contexts. Brill's Companions to Classical Studies. Leiden: Brill. doi:10.1163/9789004400566. ISBN 978-90-04-24336-1.
- Worldmaking and Cuneiform Antiquity: An Anthropology of Science. Cambridge University Press. 2025. ISBN 978-1-009-52233-5.
- Francesca Rochberg, ed. (2026). Studies in Premodern Sciences in Memory of Noel M. Swerdlow: Antiquity to the Renaissance. Archimedes. Vol. 74. Cham: Springer. doi:10.1007/978-3-032-04040-4. ISBN 978-3-032-04039-8.
- The Babylonian Science of Celestial Signs. Elements in Ancient Science, Technology and Medicine. Cambridge University Press. 2026. ISBN 978-1-009-55507-4.
