= Robert McCormick Adams Jr. =

American anthropologist and secretary of the Smithsonian Institution (1926-2018)

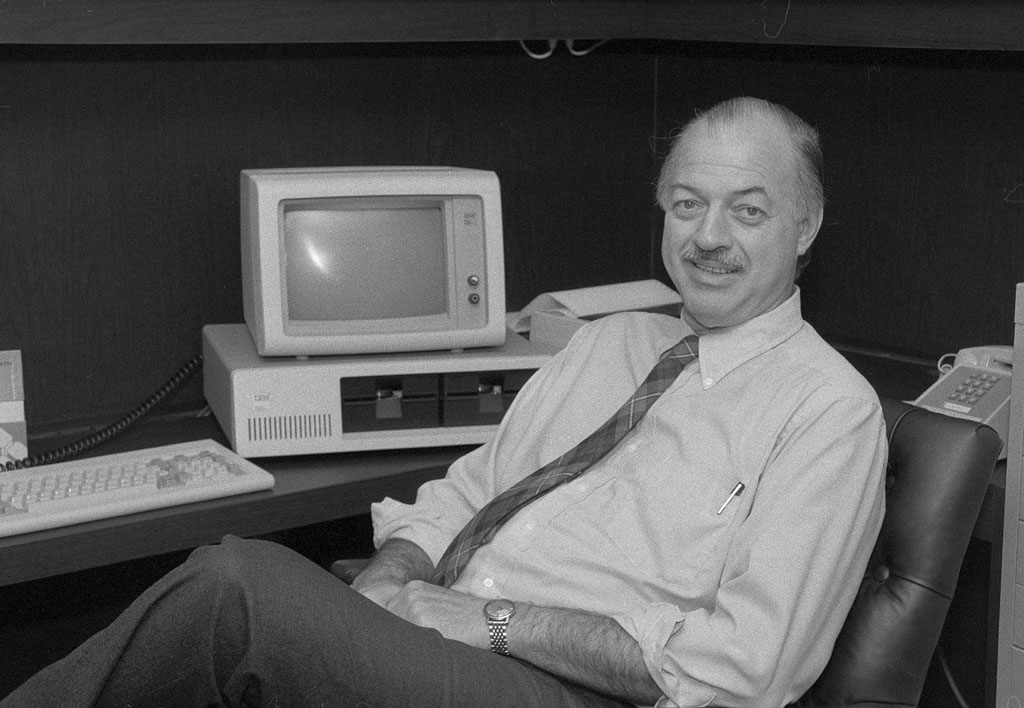

9th Secretary of the Smithsonian Institution
- In office 1984–1994
- Preceded by: S. Dillon Ripley
- Succeeded by: I. Michael Heyman

Director of the Oriental Institute, Chicago
- In office 1962–1968
- Preceded by: Carl Hermann Kraeling
- Succeeded by: George R. Hughes
- In office 1981–1983
- Preceded by: John A. Brinkman
- Succeeded by: Janet Johnson

Personal details
- Born: July 23, 1926 Chicago, Illinois, U.S.
- Died: January 27, 2018 (aged 91) Chula Vista, California, U.S.
- Education: University of Chicago (BA, MA, PhD)
- Scientific career
- Known for: Research in Iraq; Anthropology; Archaeology
- Spouse: Ruth Skinner Adams
- Awards: Gold Medal Award
- Fields: Archaeology
- Thesis: Level and trend in early Sumerian civilization (1956)
- Doctoral advisor: Robert J. Braidwood
- Doctoral students: Guillermo Algaze; Gregory Possehl; Henry T. Wright

Robert McCormick Adams Jr. (July 23, 1926 – January 27, 2018) was an American anthropologist and secretary of the Smithsonian Institution (1984–94). He worked in both the Near East and Mesoamerica. A long time professor of the University of Chicago, he was best known for his research in Iraq.

== Early life and education ==
Born in Chicago, Illinois, he attended Francis W. Parker School and graduated in 1943. He received his doctorate from the University of Chicago (1957), where he was also employed as a member of the faculty. He was Director of the Oriental Institute at the University of Chicago (1962–68, 1981–83). He served as the provost of the University of Chicago (1982–84). He was an adjunct professor at the University of California, San Diego, at the time of his death.

== Secretary of the Smithsonian ==
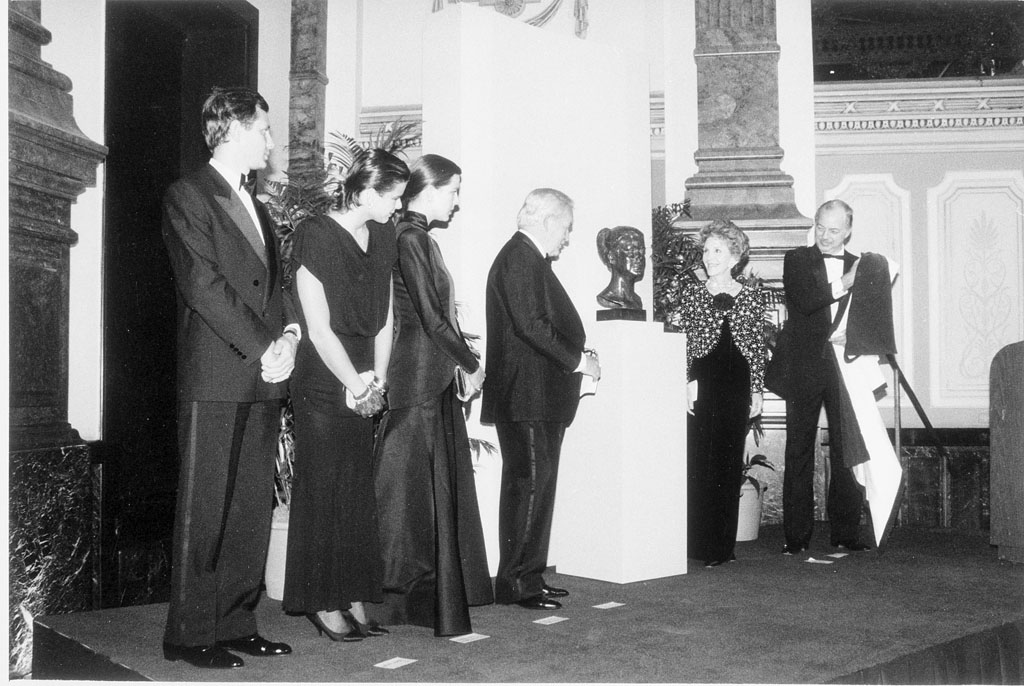
Adams and Nancy Reagan at the presentation of a portrait head of Grace Kelly at the National Portrait Gallery in October 1986, alongside Kelly's widower, Prince Rainier III of Monaco, and her children, Albert, Caroline and Stéphanie

Adams served as the ninth secretary of the Smithsonian Institution in Washington, D.C., from 1984 to 1994. He was installed as Smithsonian Secretary on September 17, 1984, becoming the head of an Institution with thirteen museums, a National Zoo, and scientific and cultural research facilities in nine states and the Republic of Panama. As the successor to S. Dillon Ripley, Adams sought to prepare the Institution for the 21st century, focus on scholarship, increase public programs, and emphasize a broader representation and involvement of diverse ethnic and cultural communities in the Smithsonian and its programs. Adams oversaw construction of the Quadrangle, a building project that brought together two museums and many disparate offices into a single structure, but he also sounded the alarm to the US Congress about the state of the Institution's aging infrastructure and began the systematic renovation of existing facilities. These "bricks and mortar" projects included renovation of the Freer Gallery of Art, the construction of the Mathias Laboratory at the Smithsonian Environmental Research Center, and the Earl S. Tupper Research and Conference Center at the Smithsonian Tropical Research Institute in Panama.

During Adams's tenure, the Smithsonian acquired the National Museum of the American Indian, and the National Postal Museum was established to showcase the National Philatelic Collection. The National Science Resources Center was created to improve the teaching of pre-college science and mathematics, and the International Center was established to explore ancient and evolving cultures and to serve as the Smithsonian's headquarters for Latin American scholarship, exhibitions, and programs. Adams formed the Smithsonian Cultural Education Committee to promote diversity across all aspects of Smithsonian operations. He also encouraged digitization projects, such as the National Air and Space Museum's videodisc technology for storage and retrieval of documents, photos, and other information. The "culture wars" arrived at the Smithsonian in 1991, with criticisms of The West as America, an exhibit at the Smithsonian American Art Museum. In 1994, Science in American Life, at the National Museum of American History, provoked outcries from the scientific community for its critical look at American science. And the first script for the Enola Gay exhibit in the National Air and Space Museum was completed shortly before Adams's departure.

== Later life ==
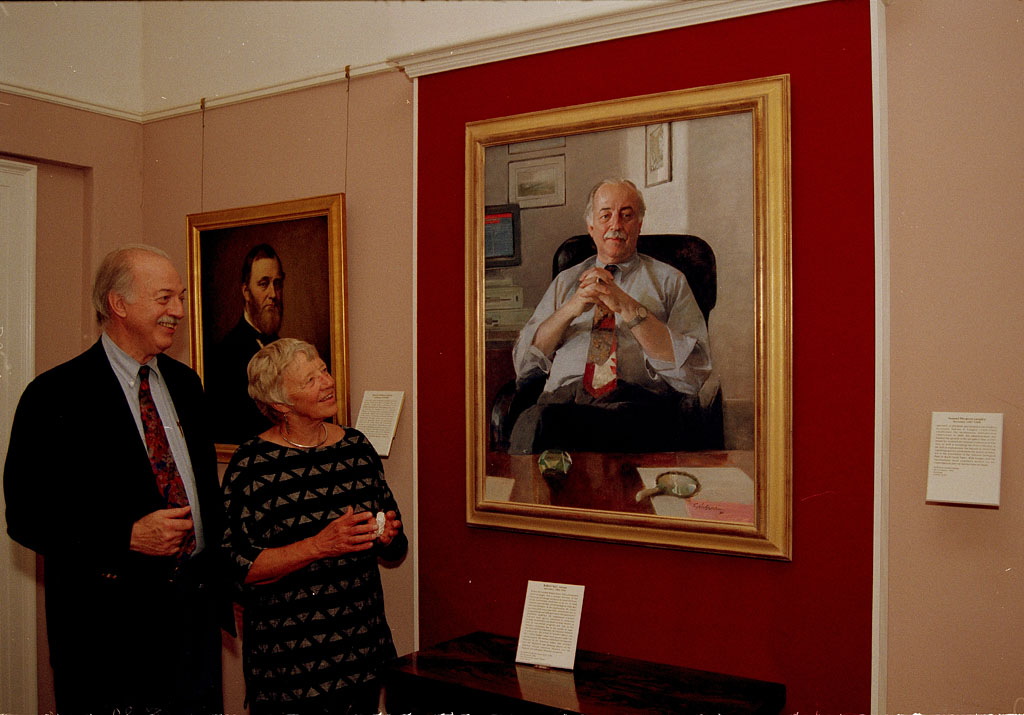
Secretary Adams and his wife

Adams retired from the Smithsonian after ten years of service in 1994 and returned to academia as an adjunct professor at the University of California, San Diego. He received a Distinguished Service Award from the Society for American Archaeology in 1996 and continued his fieldwork and research in the archaeology and anthropology of the Middle East.

== Scholarly research ==
Robert McCormick Adams has had a wide-ranging career spanning many fields. Geographically, his interests have involved extensive fieldwork in the Middle East, but have also included Mexico. With a broadly interdisciplinary approach, he has studied the course of development of urban civilizations over many millennia, and he has also dealt with the history of technology. Partly as an outgrowth of decades of experience in Iraq, Iran and Saudi Arabia, he has until recently been involved in studies of multiethnic violence under the joint sponsorship of the US National Academy of Sciences and the Russian Academy of Sciences.

Over the course of his career Adams has emphasized the importance of social interaction and cultural ecology in the evolution of civilizations. His research has explored how cultural ecology can help explain the rise of civilizations and how cultures affect each other.

Adams has proposed, based on his excavations in Mesopotamia, that there was no single condition behind the complex societies of ancient cities and states; they were a product of numerous interrelated conditions, especially social organization and craft specialization. He was elected a Fellow of the American Academy of Arts and Sciences in 1957, a member of the United States National Academy of Sciences in 1970, and a member of the American Philosophical Society in 1974. In 1988, he received the Golden Plate Award of the American Academy of Achievement. Adams received the Gold Medal Award for Distinguished Archaeological Achievement in 2002 from the Archaeological Institute of America.

== Works ==
- The Land Behind Baghdad: A History of Settlement on the Diyala Plains (1965)
- TREND AND TRADITION IN NEAR EASTERN ARCHAEOLOGY (1966)
- The Evolution of Urban Society: Early Mesopotamia and Prehispanic Mexico (1966)
- Michael M. Davis, a Tribute (1971)
- The Uruk countryside: The natural setting of urban societies (1972)
- PATTERNS OF URBANIZATION IN EARLY SOUTHERN MESOPOTAMIA (1973)
- WORLD PICTURE, ANTHROPOLOGICAL FRAME [DISTINGUISHED LECTURE - 1976] (1977)
- Heartland of Cities:Surveys of Ancient Settlement and Land Use on the Central Floodplain of the Euphrates (1981)
- Oriental Institute 1982-83 Annual Report (University of Chicago) (1983)
- Science, Ethics, and Food: Papers and Proceedings of a Colloquium Organized by the Smithsonian Institution (Smithsonian International Symposia Series) (1988)
- SMITHSONIAN YEAR 1992 (1993)
- Smithsonian: February 1993 (1993)
- Paths of Fire: An anthropologist's inquiry into Western technology (1996)
- The Family in America: Searching for Social Harmony in the Industrial Age (2003)

== See also ==
- Martin Harwit

== Bibliography ==
- "Adams, Robert McCormick", Academic American Encyclopedia, 1991 edition, vol 1., p. 97.
- Urbanized Landscapes in Early Syro-Mesopotamia and Prehispanic Mesoamerica. Papers of a Cross-Cultural Seminar held in Honor of Robert McCormick Adams, eds by D. Domenici and N. Marchetti, Wiesbaden 2018 (downloadable in Open Access).
