= Erica Reiner =

Hungarian-American Assyriologist (1924–2005)

- Born: 4 August 1924; Budapest, Hungary
- Died: 31 December 2005 (aged 81); Hyde Park, Chicago
- Education: University of Chicago; University of Budapest
- Scientific career
- Fields: Assyriology
- Workplaces: University of Chicago
- Doctoral advisor: Benno Landsberger

Erica Reiner (4 August 1924 – 31 December 2005) was an American Assyriologist and author. From 1974, she was editor of the Chicago Assyrian Dictionary, which was published in 21 volumes over 55 years, being completed in 2011 after her death. Reiner was associated with the Oriental Institute at the University of Chicago. Her work concentrated on developing the Chicago Assyrian Dictionary, the basic reference work for understanding the Akkadian language, the predominant language of Mesopotamia from 2400 BC to 100 AD.

== Early life and education ==
Erica Reiner was born in Budapest, Hungary. She graduated from the University of Budapest in 1948. She went to the University of Chicago in 1952 for graduate work and received a Ph.D. in 1955.

== Academic career ==
Reiner joined the Chicago faculty in 1956. Extensive documentation and planning for the Chicago Assyrian Dictionary had been underway at the university since 1921. Reiner, along with A. Leo Oppenheim, led the team after World War II to publish the first of what would be 21 volumes in 1956. She took over the project at Oppenheim's death in 1974; in total, she worked on the project for 44 years. Twenty volumes were released over 55 years.

Reiner was the John A. Wilson Distinguished Service Professor Emerita in the university's Oriental Institute, and the longtime Editor of the Chicago Assyrian Dictionary (1974-1996). Among other accomplishments, Reiner was one of the few people in the world proficient in the Elamite language.

She wrote numerous books and articles. Upon her retirement in 1996, she continued to contribute to the Dictionary.

She trained many graduate students in Assyriology during her years at the University of Chicago, including the late Joan Goodnick Westenholz, who was curator at the Bible Lands Museum in Jerusalem; Francesca Rochberg, the Catherine and William L. Magistretti Distinguished Professor of Near Eastern Studies at University of California, Berkeley; and Grant Frame, now Professor Emeritus at the University of Pennsylvania and Curator Emeritus of the Babylonian Section of the Penn Museum.

== Selected works ==
- Your Thwarts in Pieces, Your Mooring Rope Cut: Poetry from Babylonia and Assyria (1985)
- Astral Magic in Babylonia (1995)

== Legacy and honors ==
- Guggenheim Fellow
- Fellow of the American Academy of Arts and Sciences
- Fellow of the American Philosophical Society
- Awarded honorary doctorates from the University of Pennsylvania and the University of Leiden.
- Chicago Assyrian Dictionary (2011)
