= Theo van den Hout =

Dutch-American scientist (born 1953)

- Born: 12 October 1953 (age 73); Amsterdam, Netherlands
- Education: University of Amsterdam; Leiden University
- Scientific career
- Workplaces: University of Chicago; New York University

Theo P. J. van den Hout (born 12 October 1953) is a Dutch-American historian and author. Van den Hout is currently the Arthur and Joann Rasmussen professor of Western Civilization and of Hittite and Anatolian Languages at the Institute for the Study of Ancient Cultures of the University of Chicago.

He is the author of several books, including: A History of Hittite Literacy: Writing and Reading in Late Bronze Age Anatolia 1650–1200 BC (Cambridge University Press, 2020) and The Elements of Hittite (Cambridge University Press, 2011). In addition to this he is the editor of the Chicago Hittite Dictionary of the University of Chicago. He has also appeared in several documentaries, including Lost Cities of the Ancients (2006).

Van den Hout is a corresponding member of the Royal Netherlands Academy of Arts and Sciences, a 2016 Fellow of the John Simon Guggenheim Memorial Foundation as well as a Senior Fellow at the Institute for the Study of the Ancient World at New York University.
