= Chicago Demotic Dictionary =

Demotic language dictionary project

The Chicago Demotic Dictionary (CDD) or The Demotic Dictionary of the Institute for the Study of Ancient Cultures of the University of Chicago is a project at the University of Chicago Institute for the Study of Ancient Cultures to create a comprehensive dictionary of the ancient Egyptian Demotic language.

== Publications ==
- 1978: Janet Helen Johnson. "The Chicago Demotic Dictionary Project." Enchoria 8, Sonderband (1978): 11–14.
- 1987: Robert K. Ritner. "The Chicago Demotic Dictionary Project: A Status Report." In Aspects of Demotic Lexicography: Acts of the Second International Congress for Demotic Studies, Leiden, 19–21 September 1984, edited by Sven P. Vleeming, 145–49. Studia Demotica 1. Leuven: Peeters, 1987.
- 1994: Janet H. Johnson. "Computers, Graphics, and Papyrology." In Proceedings of the 20th International Congress of Papyrologists, pp. 618–20. Copenhagen: Museum Tusculanum, 1993.
- 1999: Janet H. Johnson. "The Chicago Demotic Dictionary Project." In Texcorpus und Wörterbuch: Aspekte zur ägyptischen Lexikographie, edited by Stefan Grunert and Ingelore Hafemann, pp. 243–57. Probleme der Ägyptologie 14. Leiden: Brill, 1999.
- 2000: Janet H. Johnson. Thus Wrote 'Onchsheshonqy: An Introductory Grammar of Demotic. Third Edition. Studies in Ancient Oriental Civilization 45. Chicago: Oriental Institute, 2000.
- 2011: Janet H. Johnson. "The Chicago Demotic Dictionary." Oriental Institute News & Notes 208 (2011): 6–8.
- 2015: Richard Spiegelberg. Wilhelm Spiegelberg: A Life in Egyptology.
- 2016: Janet H. Johnson. "The Chicago Demotic Dictionary: Its History and Its Future." Oriental Institute News & Notes216 (2013): 3–8.
- 2019: Janet H. Johnson and Brian P. Muhs. "The Chicago Demotic Dictionary." In Discovery New Pasts: The OI at 100, edited by Theo van den Hour, pp. 201–5. Chicago: Oriental Institute, 2019.
