= John Elof Boodin =

John Elof Boodin (November 14, 1869 – November 14, 1950) was a Swedish-born American philosopher and educator. He was the author of numerous books proposing a systematic interpretation of nature. Boodin's work preserved the tradition of philosophical idealism within the framework of contemporary science. Boodin also focused on the social nature of human behavior believing an understanding required an appreciation of individual participation in social life and interpersonal relationship.

== Background ==
John Elof Boodin was born in Pjätteryd Parish in Älmhult, Kronoberg County, Sweden. Boodin was a younger son of sizable rural family. In his youth, several of his brothers had already immigrated to the United States. During his lifetime additional siblings continued to settle in America. He attended the Fjellstedt mission training school established by Swedish Lutheran missionary Peter Fjellstedt in Uppsala. He emigrated to the United States from Småland, Sweden in 1887 at the age of 18. He taught at the parochial school of the First Evangelical Lutheran Church of Galesburg, Illinois. Boodin subsequently attended Augustana College in Rock Island, Illinois. He was later educated at the University of Colorado at Boulder and University of Minnesota where he was influenced by the psychologists James Rowland Angell, William James, and Josiah Royce. He studied philosophy under James Seth at Brown University where he earned his B.A. and M.A. before doctoral work at Harvard University, where he received his Ph.D. in 1899.

== Career ==
Boodin held positions at Grinnell College (1900–1904), the University of Kansas (1904–1913), Carleton College, Minnesota (1913–1927), University of Southern California, and University of California at Los Angeles (1927–1928). During his professional career and into his retirement, he published eight books. He also wrote more than sixty articles for various scholarly journals. The workpapers of John Elof Boodin are maintained at the University of California Los Angeles Library Special Collections.

== Awards and honors ==
Among many honors bestowed upon him were his election in 1937 to membership in the permanent council of the World Congress of Philosophy; membership in the Authors' Club of London; appointment as Sir John Adams Lecturer in 1935 and as Faculty Research Lecturer in 1937 at the University of California at Los Angeles. He served as director of the Los Angeles Public Library Lectures on Philosophy and as president of The Metaphysical Society in Los Angeles. He also served as president of the American Philosophical Association, Western Division (1932–33).

== Selected works ==
- Time and Reality (1904)
- Truth and Reality: An Introduction to the Theory of Knowledge (1911)
- A Realistic Universe - An Introduction to Metaphysics (1916)
- Cosmic Evolution: Outlines of Cosmic Idealism (1925)
- God and Creation (1934) two volumes: Three Interpretations of the Universe, and God
- The Social Mind; Foundations of Social Philosophy (1939)
- Religion Of Tomorrow (1943)
- Studies in Philosophy; the Posthumous Papers of John Elof Boodin (1957)

== See also ==
- American philosophy

== Other sources ==
- Eugene Clay Holmes (1942) Social Philosophy and the Social Mind. A Study of the Genetic Methods of J. M. Baldwin, G. H. Mead and John Elof Boodin (Columbia University)
- James Alfred Martin, Jr. (1945) Empirical Philosophers of Religion, with Special Reference to Boodin, Brightman, Hocking, Macintosh and Wieman (King's Crown Press)
