= Pennsylvania Sumerian Dictionary =

Dictionary of the Sumerian language

The Pennsylvania Sumerian Dictionary (PSD) is a project to compile a comprehensive dictionary of the Sumerian language. It is run out of the University of Pennsylvania's Museum of Archaeology and Anthropology and funded by both private donors and the National Endowment for the Humanities. The project began under the direction of Åke W. Sjöberg (1924–2014) and Erle Leichty (1933-2016) in 1974 and was modeled on the Chicago Assyrian Dictionary, itself begun in 1921. In 1976 it received its first federal funds from the National Endowment for the Humanities, and in 1984 published its first section for the letter B; only 750 copies were originally printed, but more were soon published as the first batch sold out surprisingly quickly at US$40 a piece. As of 1989 Sjöberg was still project director, and despite retiring in 1996 continued to contribute.

In 1991 Steve Tinney joined the project, and several years later decided to reconfigure the project from an envisioned 18-volume series into an online electronic dictionary that could be progressively updated. The new, online format was named the "electronic Pennsylvania Sumerian Dictionary," or ePSD. Many shorter definitions were added as opposed to the original format of long entries in the printed A and B volumes. The data sets from several other projects attempting to put Sumerian texts in electronic form on the Internet are expected to be eventually integrated into the dictionary project. In July 2002, Tinney became the project's director.

In April 2002, the project received a two-year US $302,000 grant from the National Endowment for the Humanities, though Tinney subsequently stated that because the dictionary project had changed into more of a process with no end date, they could no longer ask for federal funds, and instead would try to establish two permanent research positions for the dictionary with US$3,000,000 in donations.

In 2017, a second version of the Pennsylvania Sumerian Dictionary was released, called ePSD2. The new version of the dictionary includes listings of over 12,000 Sumerian words, phrases and names, occurring in almost 100,000 distinct forms a total of over 2.27 million times. The corpus covers about 100,000 of the 134,000+ known Sumerian texts. Staff involved with ePSD2 are Steve Tinney, director, Philip Jones, executive editor, and Niek Veldhuis, associate editor. The resource contains a glossary, corpus and catalogue, sign list, index to literature, and a variety of articles about Sumerian.
