= Hans Ehelolf =

German Hittitologist (1881–1939)

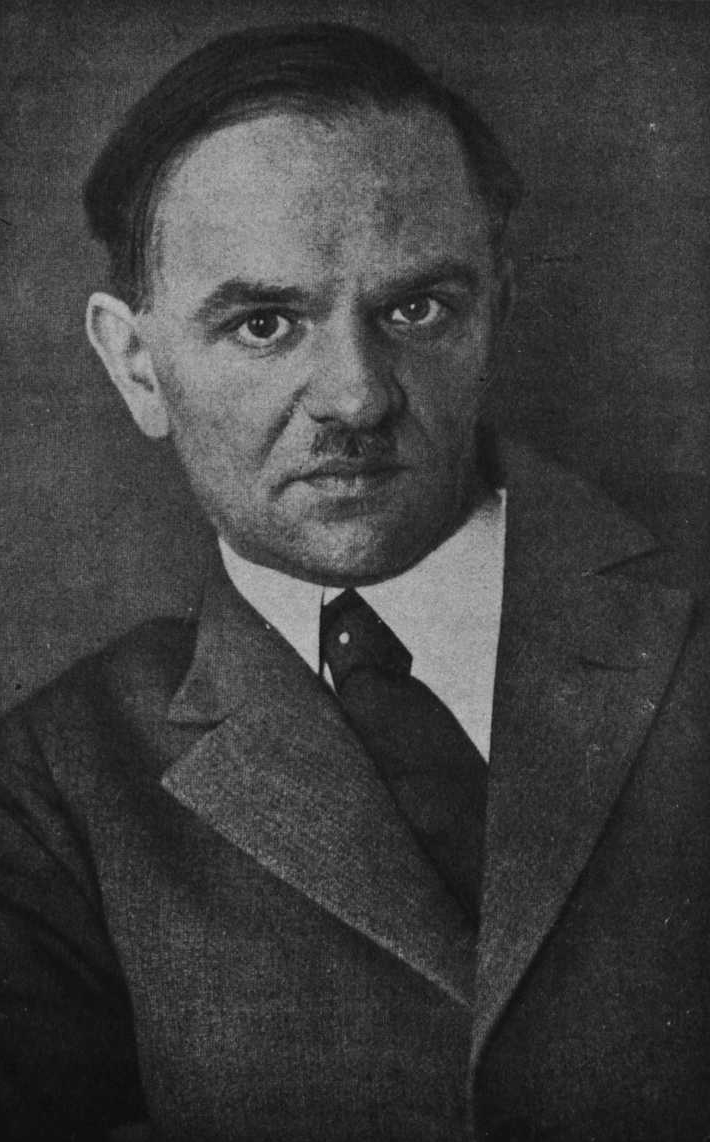
Hans Ehelolf

Hans Wilhelm Heinrich Ehelolf (July 30, 1881 – May 29, 1939) was a German Hittitologist.

He was born in Hanover, Lower Saxony. He began his oriental studies in Marburg, focusing on Assyriology, Semitic linguistics, Indology, and Biblical exegesis. He wrote a PhD thesis titled Ein Wortfolgeprinzip im Assyrisch-Babylonischen and received his degree on July 29, 1914. Ehelolf served in World War I and was awarded the Iron Cross 2nd Class and the Turkish Iron Crescent.

== Works ==
- Ein Wortfolgeprinzip im Assyrisch-Babylonischen. Leipzig: Hinrichs. 1916.
- Der altassyrische Kalender; with Benno Landsberger, in ZDMG 74, S. 216ff.
- Ein altassyrisches Rechtsbuch; translation by Hans Ehelolf (1922).
- Wettlauf und Spiel im hethitischen Ritual, in Sitzungsberichteder preussischen Akademie der Wissenschaften (1925).
- Das hethitische Ritual des Papanikri von Komana; with Ferdinand Sommer, Boghazköi-Studien, Book 10 (1924).
