= Chicago Hittite Dictionary =

Hittite language dictionary project

The Chicago Hittite Dictionary (CHD) (The Hittite Dictionary of the Institute for the Study of Ancient Cultures of the University of Chicago) is a project at the University of Chicago's Institute for the Study of Ancient Cultures (formerly known as the Oriental Institute) to create a comprehensive dictionary of the Hittite language. The project was founded by Hans Gustav Güterbock and Harry Hoffner in 1975 and funded by the National Endowment for the Humanities. As of January 2026, it is co-edited by Theo van den Hout and Petra Goedegebuure. Hoffner originally hoped that the project could be completed by 2000, though as of 2005 it was expected to last until 2045. It is one of several dictionary projects at the institute, including the Chicago Assyrian Dictionary and the Chicago Demotic Dictionary.

== List of volumes ==
- L–N, fascicle 1 (la- to ma-). Oriental Institute of the University of Chicago. 1980. ISBN 0-918986-27-3.
- L–N, fascicle 2 (-ma to miyahuwant-). Oriental Institute of the University of Chicago. 1983. ISBN 0-918986-38-9.
- L–N, fascicle 3 (miyahuwant- to nai-). Oriental Institute of the University of Chicago. 1986. ISBN 0-918986-48-6.
- L–N, fascicle 4 (nai- to nutarnu-). Oriental Institute of the University of Chicago. 1989. ISBN 0-918986-58-3.
- L–N, fascicles 1–4. Oriental Institute of the University of Chicago. 1989. ISBN 0-918986-58-3.
- P, fascicle 1 (pa- to para). Oriental Institute of the University of Chicago. 1994. ISBN 0-918986-95-8.
- P, fascicle 2 (para- to pattar). Oriental Institute of the University of Chicago. 1995. ISBN 1-885923-00-7.
- P, fascicle 3 (pattar to putkiya-). Oriental Institute of the University of Chicago. 1997. ISBN 1-885923-06-6.
- P, fascicles 1–3. Oriental Institute of the University of Chicago. 1997. ISBN 1-885923-06-6.
- S, fascicle 1 (sa- to saptamenzu). Oriental Institute of the University of Chicago. 2002. ISBN 1-885923-20-1.
- S, fascicle 2 (saptamenzu to si). Oriental Institute of the University of Chicago. 2005. ISBN 1-885923-37-6.
- S, fascicle 3 (se- to sizisalla-). Oriental Institute of the University of Chicago. 2013. ISBN 1-885923-95-3.
- S, fascicle 4 (-sma/i- A to sūu-). Oriental Institute of the University of Chicago. 2019. ISBN 978-1-61491-047-3.
- S, fascicles 1-4. Oriental Institute of the University of Chicago. 2019. ISBN 978-1-61491-050-3.
