= John Wilson (Egyptologist) =

American Egyptologist (1899–1976)

John Albert Wilson (September 12, 1899 – August 30, 1976) was an American Egyptologist who was the Andrew MacLeish Distinguished Service Professor at the University of Chicago.

After graduating from Princeton University in 1920 he taught English at the American University in Beirut. There he met faculty member Harold H. Nelson who introduced him to hieroglyphics and in 1923 to the famous Egyptologist James Henry Breasted. He was offered by Breasted a fellowship at the Oriental Institute, where he earned his doctorate in 1926.

He was sent to Luxor by Breasted as an epigrapher and after further study at the Ludwig-Maximilians-Universität München and the Friedrich Wilhelm University of Berlin, he returned to Chicago and was appointed associate professor of Egyptology at the University of Chicago in 1931. He succeeded Breasted as director of the Oriental Institute when he died in 1936. He continued as Director until 1946 after leading the Institute through a difficult financial period. He was honored by being named Distinguished Service Professor in 1953.

With the building of the Aswan Dam he was appointed as the American representative and eventually became the chairman of the UNESCO Consultative Committee for the Salvage of the Nubian Monuments.

He had many honors conferred upon him by various universities and societies including: D. Lii. by Princeton (1961), D.H.L by Loyola University of Chicago, elected as a corresponding member of the German Archaeological Society (1954), a member of the American Philosophical Society (1954), a Fellow of the American Academy of Arts and Sciences (1968) and corresponding member of the Institut d'Egypte (1969). Through a benefactor the John A. Wilson Professorship of Oriental Studies was inaugurated in 1968. On his seventieth birthday former students and colleagues presented him with a book Studies in Honor of John A. Wilson (1969). In 1963, he appeared on the game show To Tell the Truth. Much of the questioning focused on plans to preserve the Abu Simbel temples from the flooding that would occur with the completion of the Aswan High Dam. According to host Bud Collyer, Wilson donated his winnings ($250) to the American Committee for Preservation of the Nubian Monuments.

== Select bibliography ==
- Medinet Habu 1928–29, The Language of the Historical Texts Commemorating Ramses III, (1930)
- Biographical Memoir of James Henry Breasted 1865–1935 (1936)
- Historical Records of Ramses III: The Texts in Medinet Habu Volumes 1 and 2. Translated With Explanatory Notes, with William F. Edgerton (1936)
- The Intellectual Adventure of Ancient Man, contributor, org. pub. 1946)
- Ancient Near Eastern Texts Relating to the Old Testament, contributor, (1950)
- The Culture of Ancient Egypt (Originally published in 1951 as "The Burden of Egypt)
- Most Ancient Verse, with Thorkild Jacobson, 1963
- Signs and Wonders Upon Pharaoh: A History of American Egyptology (1964)
- Thousands of Years: An Archaeologist's Search for Ancient Egypt (1972)
