= Carl Axel Brolén =

Swedish academic

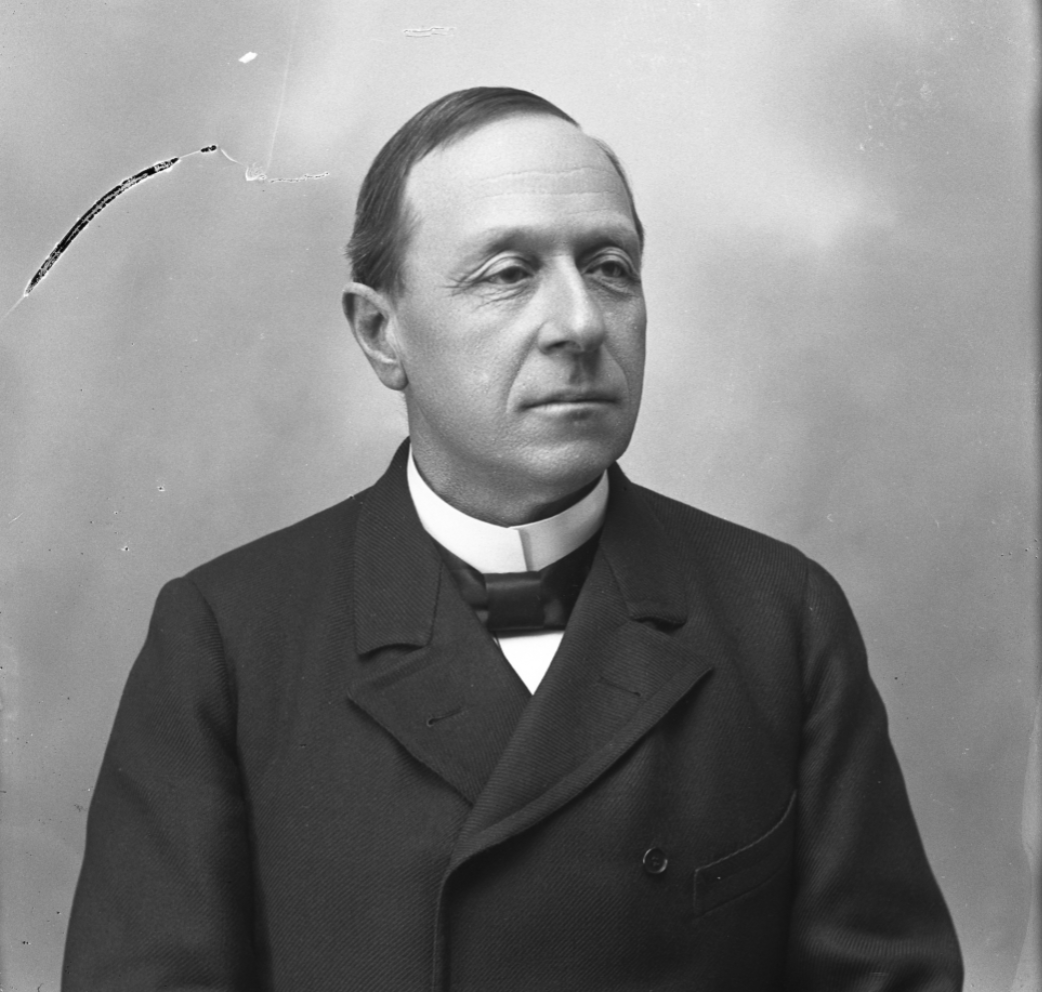
Carl Axel Brolén

Carl Axel Brolén, born 14 June 1845, died 26 June 1939, was a Swedish Latinist and schoolmaster. He was the father of Nils Brolén.

Brolén became a Doctor of Philosophy at the Uppsala University 1872 with the thesis De elocutione A. Cornelii Celsi, and the same year he became a docent. He was then the tutor of the Crown Prince Gustaf 1872–76. Brolén became a lector in Gävle 1880, rector at Västerås' higher general grammar school 1883 and at Uppsala higher general grammar school 1899–1911. From 1911 to 1925 he taught at the Fjellstedt School. Brolén published, amongst other things, Senecas Valda skrifter (1883) and Om Alströmerska brefsamlingen i Upsala universitetsbibliotek (1917).
