= J. H. Johnson (politician) =

American politician

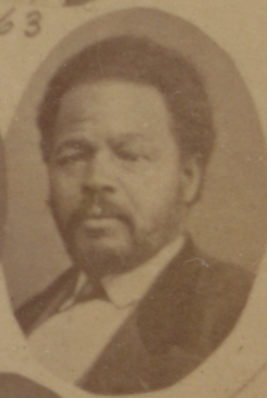

Member of the Mississippi House of Representatives
- In office 1872–1875

Personal details
- Party: Republican
- Education: Oberlin College
- Profession: Politician

J. H. Johnson was a state legislator in Mississippi. He represented DeSoto County, Mississippi in the Mississippi House of Representatives 1872–1875.

He was an abolitionist from Ohio who assisted people in their escape from slavery. He served as a trustee of a normal school in Holly Springs, Mississippi.

He studied at Oberlin College. He attended a colored convention in 1872. He was described as short, very stout, and as having one-half Anglo-Saxon blood. He proposed a bill to establish a female normal school in Hillsboro, Mississippi. He was a Republican.

== See also ==
- African American officeholders from the end of the Civil War until before 1900
