= Carl Joseph Fast =

Swedish missionary (1822–1850)

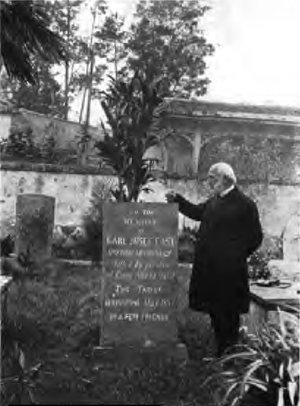
Tombstone of C.J. Fast in Fuzhou, ca. 1910

Carl Joseph Fast (simplified Chinese: 发士; traditional Chinese: 發士; pinyin: Fāshì; (also written as 法士) Foochow Romanized: Huák-sê̤u; October 8, 1822 – November 13, 1850) was the second Swedish missionary sent to China and the first Protestant missionary murdered in Fuzhou.

On January 1, 1850, Fast arrived in Foochow (today Fuzhou) as the missionary from the Lutheran Lund Missionary Society of Sweden, and was joined by Anders Elgqvist later that year. The mission they set up in China was short-lived. On November 13, 1850, the two missionaries were brutally assaulted by Chinese pirates when they were coming up the River Min after getting money from a ship. Armed with a pistol Elgqvist survived the attack, but Fast was killed on the spot.

Fast was buried in Fuzhou Nantai. An order was given by then-Fujian Governor Xu Jiyu (徐继畬) to capture the murderers within three days, and the case was finally settled on November 18, with three criminals brought to justice.
