= Janet Helen Johnson =

US Egyptologist and academic

- Born: 24 December 1944 (age 81)

Academic background
- Education: University of Chicago
- Thesis: Demotic verbs and dialects (1972)

Academic work
- Discipline: Egyptologist

Janet Helen Johnson (born December 24, 1944) is an American Egyptologist and academic, specializing in Egyptian language and the Late Period of ancient Egypt. Since 2003, she has been Morton D. Hull Distinguished Service Professor of Egyptology at the University of Chicago. She was Director of Chicago's Oriental Institute from 1983 to 1989.

Johnson studied at the University of Chicago, graduating with a Bachelor of Arts (BA) degree in 1967 and a Doctor of Philosophy (PhD) degree in 1972. She has spent almost all of her academic career at the University of Chicago: she was appointed assistant professor in 1972, promoted to associate professor in 1979 and to professor in 1981. She has also been a research associate at the Field Museum of Natural History, holding the position from 1980 to 1984 and from 1994 to 1999.

== Honors ==
Johnson was awarded a Festschrift in 2018: it was titled "Essays for the Library of Seshat: Studies Presented to Janet H. Johnson on the Occasion of Her 70th Birthday" and was edited by Robert K. Ritner.

== Selected works ==
- Johnson, Janet H. (1986). Thus wrote ꜥOnchsheshonqy: an introductory grammar of Demotic (1st ed.). Chicago, Il: Oriental Institute of the University of Chicago. ISBN 978-0918986498.
- Whitcomb, Donald S.; Johnson, Janet H. (1982). Quseir al-Qadim 1980: preliminary report. Malibu: Undena Publications. ISBN 978-0890031124.
- Johnson, Janet H. (1991). Thus wrote ꜥOnchsheshonqy: an introductory grammar of Demotic (2nd ed.). Chicago, Il: Oriental Institute of the University of Chicago. ISBN 978-0918986764.
- Johnson, Janet H., ed. (1992). Life in a multi-cultural society: Egypt from Cambyses to Constantine and beyond. Chicago, Il: Oriental Institute of the University of Chicago. ISBN 978-0918986849.
- Johnson, Janet H. (2004). The Demotic Verbal System (2nd ed.). Chicago: Oriental Institute of the University of Chicago. ISBN 978-0918986023.
- Teeter, Emily; Johnson, Janet H., eds. (2009). The life of Meresamun: a temple singer in ancient Egypt. Chicago, Il: Oriental Institute of the University of Chicago. ISBN 978-1885923608.

Academic offices
| Preceded by Robert McCormick Adams Jr. | Director of the Oriental Institute, Chicago; 1983 to 1989 | Succeeded by William Marvin Sumner |
