= Carl Hermann Kraeling =

American historian

- Born: March 10, 1897; Brooklyn, New York
- Died: November 14, 1966 (aged 69); New Haven
- Citizenship: US
- Education: Columbia University, Lutheran Theological Seminary (B.D.)
- Occupations: theologian, historian, archaeologist
- Known for: publications on the synagogue and the Christian chapel of Dura-Europos president of the American Schools of Oriental Research

Carl Hermann Kraeling (1897–1966), an American theologian, historian, and archaeologist; born in Brooklyn on March 10, 1897, and died in New Haven on November 14, 1966; he is known for his publications on the synagogue and the Christian chapel of Dura-Europos.

He studied at Columbia University, and earned his B.D. from the Lutheran Theological Seminary in Philadelphia in 1926. He taught New Testament Studies at the Yale University and established the department of Near Eastern languages and Civilizations there.

Kraeling served as the president of the American Schools of Oriental Research (ASOR) from 1949 to 1954. He supported the continued study of the Dead Sea Scrolls, and encouraged humanitarian awareness for Near Eastern refugees during a turbulent period in the area's history. He was elected a member of the American Philosophical Society in 1958.

== Works ==
- Anthropos and Son of Man (1927)
- Gerasa, City of the Decapolis (1938)
- John the Baptist, (New York, 1951)
- The Synagogue, The Excavations at Dura-Europos, Final Report VIII.1 (New Haven, 1956)

== Bibliography ==
- J. S. Thacher, "Carl H. Kraeling (1897-1966)", Dumbarton Oaks Papers, 21 (1967), 7.
- W. F. Albright, "Carl Herman Kraeling: In Memoriam", Bulletin of the American Schools of Oriental Research, 189 (avril 1970), 4–7.
- William F. Albright, Carl Herman Kraeling – In Menoriam The American Schools of Oriental Research (1970), p. 4 ff
