= Benno Landsberger =

German Assyriologist (1890–1968)

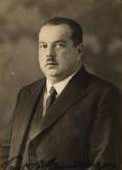
- Born: 21 April 1890; Friedek, Austrian Silesia
- Died: 26 April 1968 (aged 78); Chicago, Illinois
- Scientific career
- Fields: Assyriology
- Doctoral students: Erica Reiner

Benno Landsberger (21 April 1890 – 26 April 1968) was a German-American Assyriologist.

== Biography ==
Benno Landsberger was born on 21 April 1890 in Friedek, then part of Austrian Silesia, and from 1908 studied Oriental Studies at Leipzig. Amongst his teachers were August Fischer in Arabic and Heinrich Zimmern in Assyriology.

In 1914, Landsberger joined the Austro-Hungarian Army, where he fought with distinction on the Eastern Front, winning a golden Distinguished Service Cross. He returned to Leipzig after the war and was appointed to the position of 'extraordinary professor" in 1926. In 1928, he was appointed successor to Peter Jensen at Marburg, but returned to Leipzig in 1929 as Zimmern's successor.

Landsberger was dismissed in 1935 as a result of the Nazi-era Nuremberg Laws which stripped Jewish people of citizenship, having been allowed to stay in Germany after the Law for the Restoration of the Professional Civil Service in 1933 due to the fact he served in WW1. Landsberger accepted a post at the new Turkish University of Ankara, working especially in the area of languages, history and geography. After 1945 he was appointed to the Oriental Institute of the University of Chicago, where he worked until 1955. During this period he became a naturalized American citizen. He was elected to the American Philosophical Society in 1959.

== Works ==
- The ritual calendar of Babylonia and Assyria Leipzig 1914 (thesis) Leipzig Semitic Studies Bd 6, H, 1 February 1915
- "Der 'Ventiv' des Akkadischen" Zeitschrift für Assyriologie 35: 113–23 1924
- Über die Völker Vorderasiens im dritten Jahrtausend Zeitschrift für Assyriologie 35: 213–44 1924
- Assyrische Handelskolonien in Kleinasien aus dem dritten Jahrtausend (Assyrian Commercial Colonies in Asia Minor from the Third Millennium) Leipzig 1925 (Der Alte Orient, Bd. 24. H. 4)
- Materialen zum sumerischen Lexikon (Materials for the Sumerian Lexicon, ed. with others) Rome 1937-
- The Assyrian Dictionary of the Oriental Institute of the University of Chicago (ed. with others) Chicago 1956-

== See also ==
- Pre-Sumerian substratum

== Sources ==
- Profile, deutsche-biographie.de. Accessed 13 February 2024. (in German)
