= Chicago Assyrian Dictionary =

Dictionary of the Akkadian language

The Chicago Assyrian Dictionary (CAD) or The Assyrian Dictionary of the Oriental Institute of the University of Chicago is a nine-decade project at the University of Chicago's Oriental Institute (now known as the Institute for the Study of Ancient Cultures) to compile a dictionary of the Akkadian language and its dialects. Modeled on the Oxford English Dictionary, work on the project was initiated in 1921 by James Henry Breasted, the founder of the Oriental Institute, who had previously worked on the Berlin dictionary of Ancient Egyptian.

From 1973 to 1996, Erica Reiner was editor in charge, followed by Martha T. Roth, dean of humanities. Initially expected to take 10 years to complete, the first volume was not published until 1956, and the 26th and final volume was published in 2011.

At a conference at the Oriental Institute on June 6, 2011, scholars assessed the significance of the dictionary. Gil Stein, director of the Oriental Institute, said it "is an indispensable research tool for any scholar anywhere who seeks to explore the written record of the Mesopotamian civilization." It is one of several large-scale United States dictionary projects for ancient Middle Eastern languages, including the Chicago Hittite Dictionary, the Pennsylvania Sumerian Dictionary, and the Comprehensive Aramaic Lexicon.

== Volumes ==
- Volume 1, A, part 1. 1964. ISBN 0-918986-06-0.
- Volume 1, A, part 2. 1968. ISBN 0-918986-07-9.
- Biggs, Robert D. (1965). Volume 2, B. ISBN 0-918986-08-7.
- Volume 3, D. 1959. ISBN 0-918986-09-5.
- Roth, Martha T.; Leo Oppenheim, A. (1958). Volume 4, E. ISBN 0-918986-10-9.
- Volume 5, G. 1956. ISBN 0-918986-11-7.
- Volume 6, H [Het]. 1956. ISBN 0-918986-12-5.
- Volume 7, I/J. 1960. ISBN 0-918986-13-3.
- Volume 8, K. 1971. ISBN 0-918986-14-1.
- Volume 9, L. 1973. ISBN 0-918986-15-X.
- Volume 10, M, part 1. 1977. ISBN 0-918986-16-8.
- Volume 10, M, part 2. 1977. ISBN 0-918986-16-8.
- Volume 11, N, part 1. 1980. ISBN 0-918986-17-6.
- Volume 11, N, part 2. 1980. ISBN 0-918986-17-6.
- Volume 12, P. 2005. ISBN 1-885923-35-X.
- Volume 13, Q. 1982. ISBN 0-918986-24-9.
- Volume 14, R. 1999. ISBN 1-885923-14-7.
- Volume 15, S. 1984. ISBN 0-918986-40-0.
- Volume 16, S [Tsade]. 1962. ISBN 0-918986-18-4.
- Volume 17, S [Shin], part 1. 1989. ISBN 0-918986-55-9.
- Volume 17, S [Shin], part 2. 1992. ISBN 0-918986-78-8.
- Volume 17, S [Shin], part 3. 1992. ISBN 0-918986-79-6.
- Volume 18, T. 2006. ISBN 1-885923-42-2.
- Volume 19, T [Tet]. 2006. ISBN 1-885923-43-0.
- Volume 20, U/W. 2010. ISBN 978-1-885923-78-3.
- Volume 21, Z. 1961. ISBN 0-918986-19-2.
