= Institute for the Study of Ancient Cultures =

Research institute and museum of the University of Chicago

Institute for the Study of Ancient Cultures, West Asia and North Africa
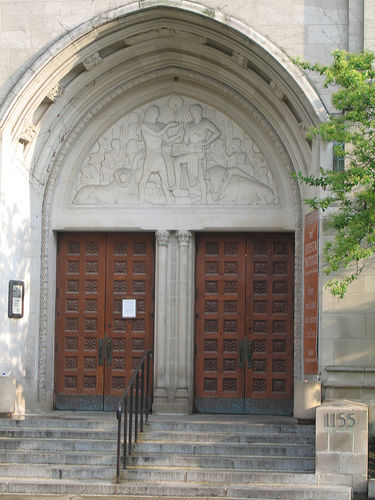
- East Meets West tympanum, designed in 1931 by sculptor Ulric Ellerhusen
- Former name: The Oriental Institute (OI)
- Established: May 1919; 107 years ago
- Location: 1155 E 58th Street; Chicago, Illinois, USA
- Coordinates: 41°47′22″N 87°35′52″W
- Type: Archaeology; languages
- Owner: University of Chicago
- Website: isac.uchicago.edu

The Institute for the Study of Ancient Cultures, West Asia and North Africa (ISAC), formerly known as the Oriental Institute (OI), is a research institute and museum of the University of Chicago, located in Hyde Park, Chicago, Illinois, United States.

Established in May 1919, the institute was founded by Egyptologist and professor James Henry Breasted with funds donated by John D. Rockefeller Jr. It conducts research on ancient civilizations throughout the Near East and North Africa, including at its Chicago House facility in Luxor, Egypt. The institute also publicly exhibits an extensive collection of artifacts related to ancient civilizations and archaeological discoveries. According to anthropologist William Parkinson of the Field Museum, the institute's highly focused "near Eastern, or southwest Asian and Egyptian" collection is one of the finest in the world.

== History ==
=== Haskell Oriental Museum ===
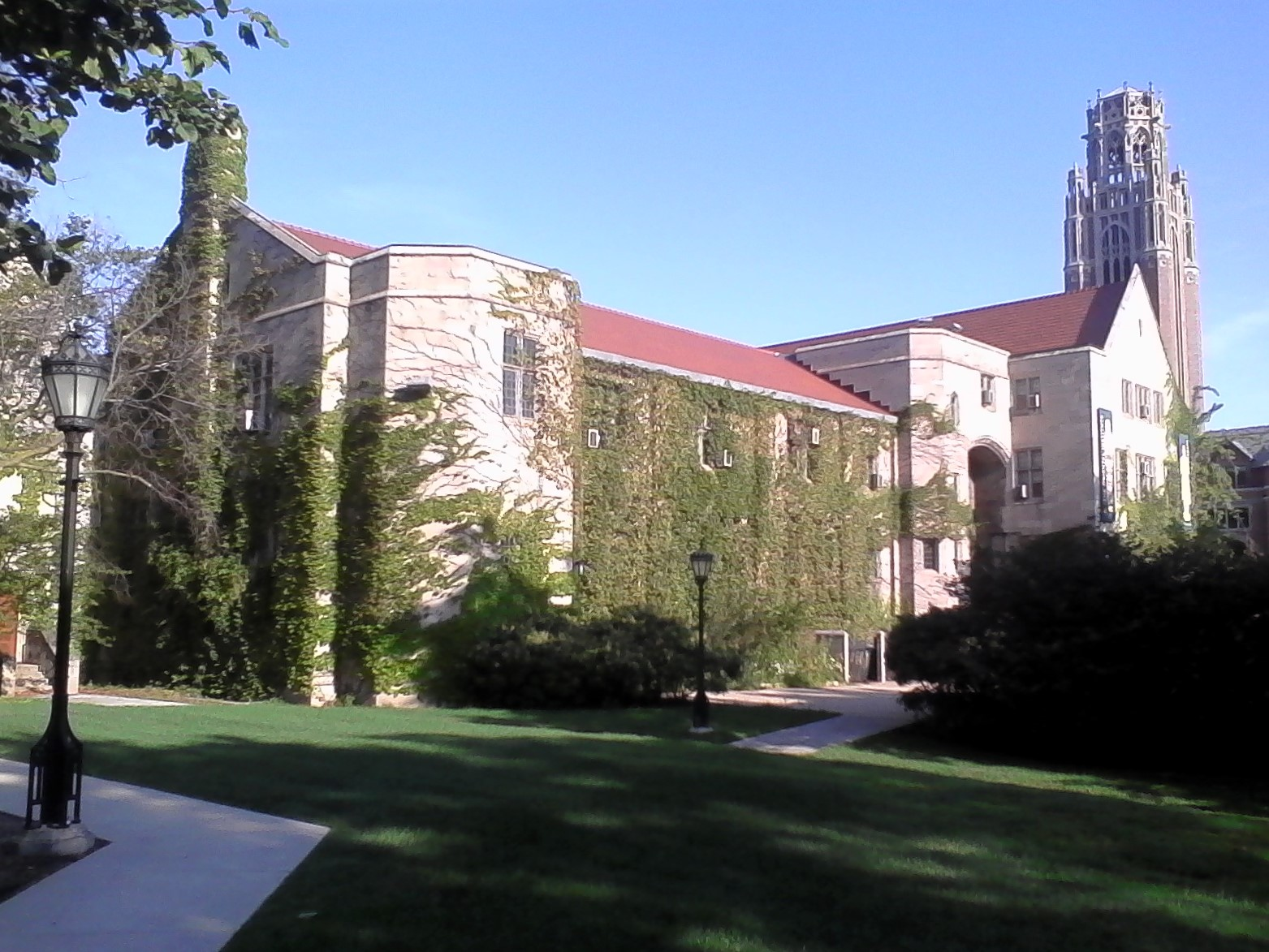
Exterior view of the ISAC building

In the early 20th century, James Henry Breasted built up the collection of the university's Haskell Oriental Museum, which he oversaw along with his field work, and teaching duties. He dreamed, however, of establishing a research institute, "a laboratory for the study of the rise and development of civilization," that would trace Western civilization to its roots in the ancient Middle East.

=== Oriental Institute ===
As World War I came toward a close, Breasted sensed an opportunity to use his influence in the new political climate to create opportunities for access to archaeology sites and their study. He wrote to John D. Rockefeller Jr., and proposed the foundation of what would become the Oriental Institute. Fundamental to the implementation of his plan was a research trip through the Middle East, which Breasted had optimistically suggested was ready to receive scholars again after the disturbances of the war. Breasted received a reply from Rockefeller pledging $50,000 over five years for the Oriental Institute. Rockefeller also assured University of Chicago president Harry Pratt Judson that he would pledge another $50,000 to the cause. The University of Chicago contributed additional support, and in May 1919 the Oriental Institute was founded.

The institute is housed in a Gothic Revival building at the corner of 58th Street and University Avenue, which was designed by the architectural firm Mayers Murray & Phillip. Construction was completed in 1930, and the building was dedicated in 1931. German American sculptor Ulric Ellerhusen designed the tympanum, titled East Meets West. Figures from the East include a lion, Zoser, Hammurabi, Thutmose III, Ashurbanipal, Darius the Great and Chosroes; the West is portrayed by a bison and Herodotus, Alexander the Great, Julius Caesar, a crusader, an excavator, and an archeologist.

Starting in 1996, the building was expanded and renovated, a process which took several years. The structure's Ludowici tile roof was fully replaced and repaired between 2000 and 2001, and the Institute allowed 250 of the 15,000 Ludowici tiles to be inscribed with messages in ancient languages to help raise funds for the effort.

In the 1990s, Tony Wilkinson, founded the 'Center for Ancient Middle Eastern Landscapes' based at the institute. Its role is to investigate the Middle East through landscape archaeology and the analysis of spatial data, including images from many decades of Middle Eastern aerial photography, and survey maps, as well as, modern satellite imagery.

=== 2023 renaming ===
In the 2010s, multiple organizations within the United States began reconsidering the use of the word "Oriental," as some scholars felt the word was alienating and that it had changed in popular meaning. In March 2023, University of Chicago administrators announced they would be changing the name of the Oriental Institute. Interim director Theo van den Hout said, "[The Oriental Institute] name has caused confusion, often contributing to the perception that our work is focused on East Asia, rather than West Asia and North Africa. Additionally, the word "oriental" has developed a pejorative connotation in modern English." In April 2023, the organization's name changed from the "Oriental Institute" to the "Institute for the Study of Ancient Cultures, West Asia and North Africa", abbreviated as ISAC. The institute's new logo features a lotus flower, which is found in ancient Assyrian, Mesopotamian, and Egyptian art, as well as being a decorative motif on the ISAC building.

== Research and collection ==
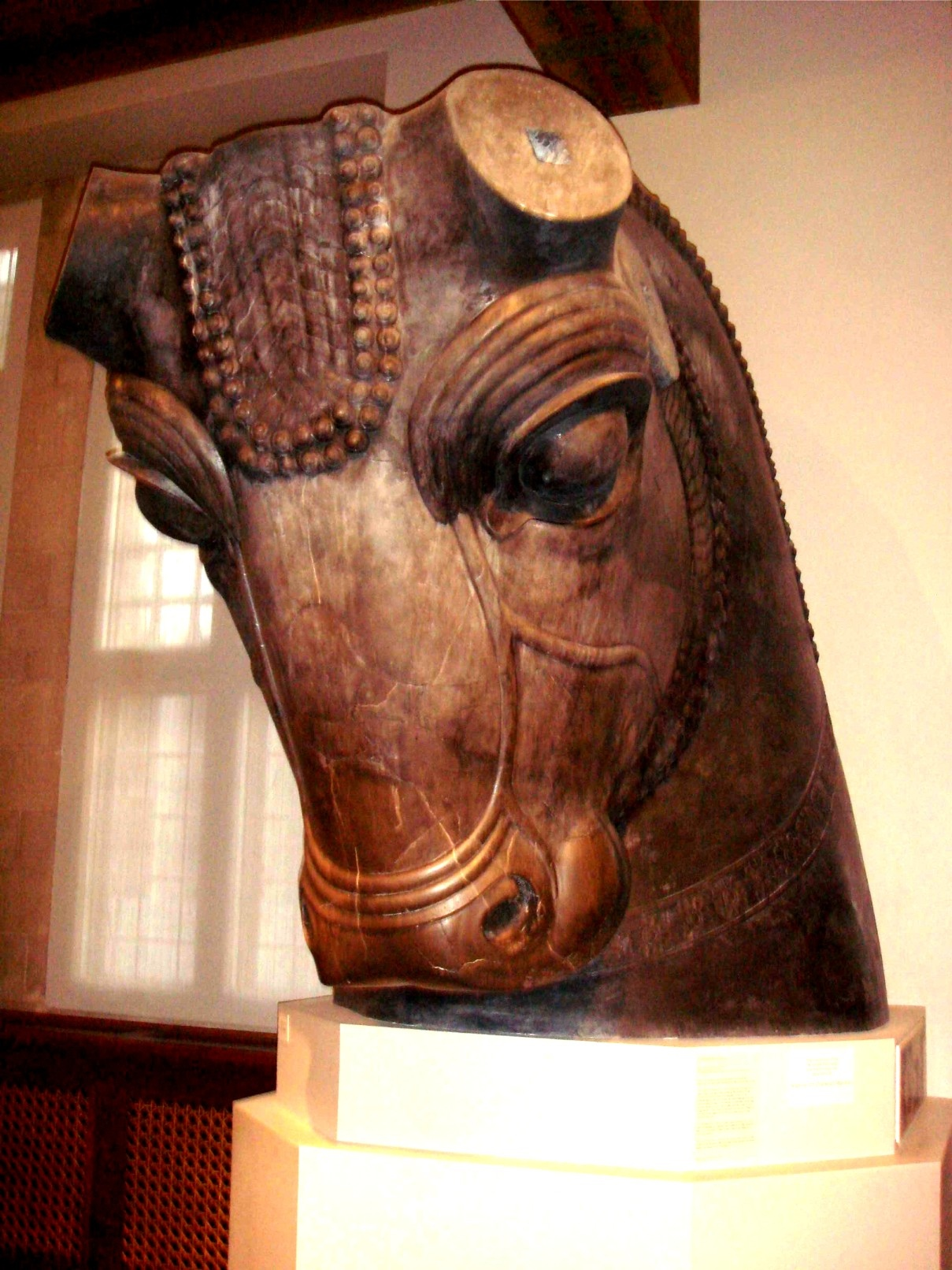
Head of a bull that once guarded the entrance to the Hundred-Column Hall in Persepolis

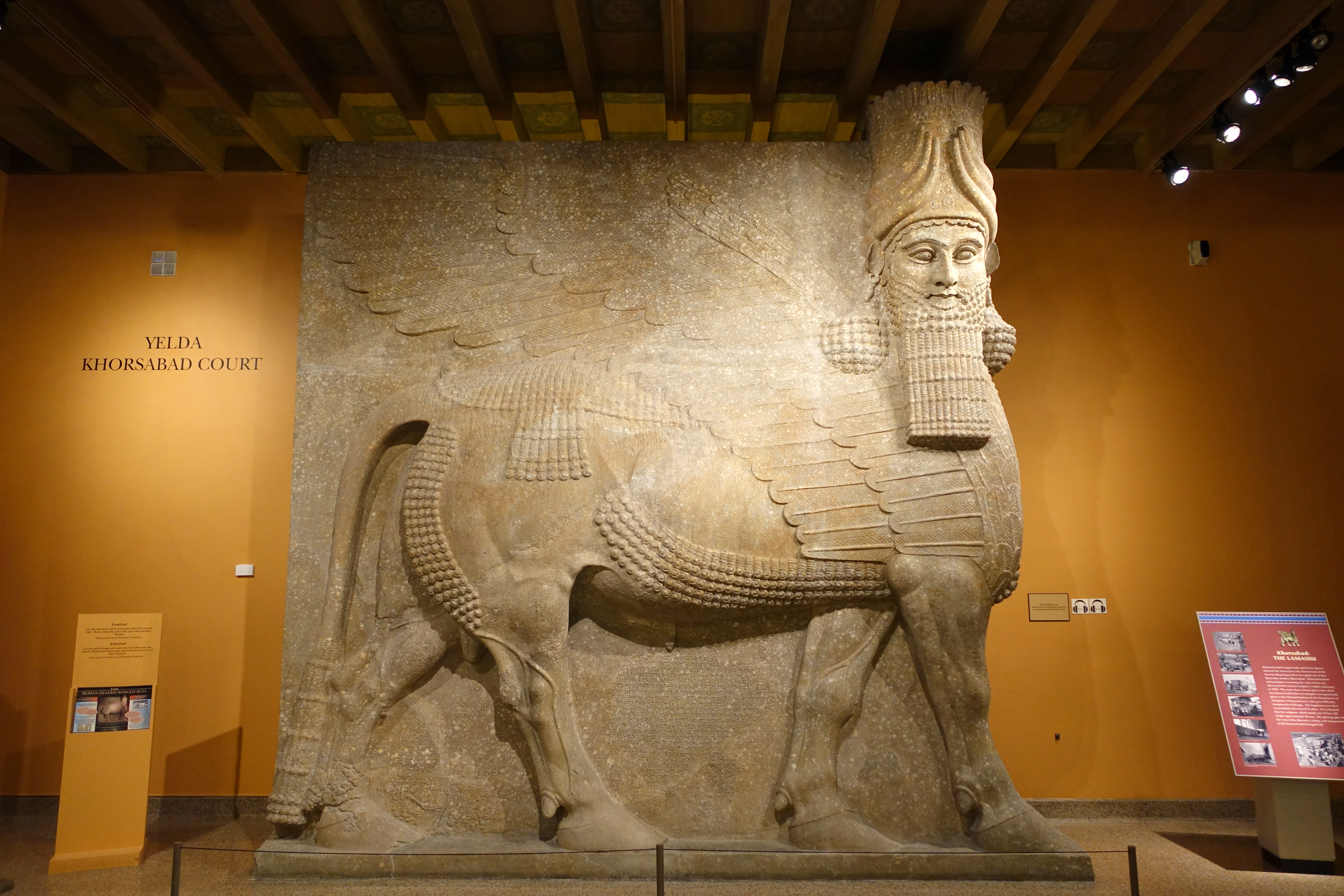
A lamassu from the palace of Sargon II at Dur-Sharrukin

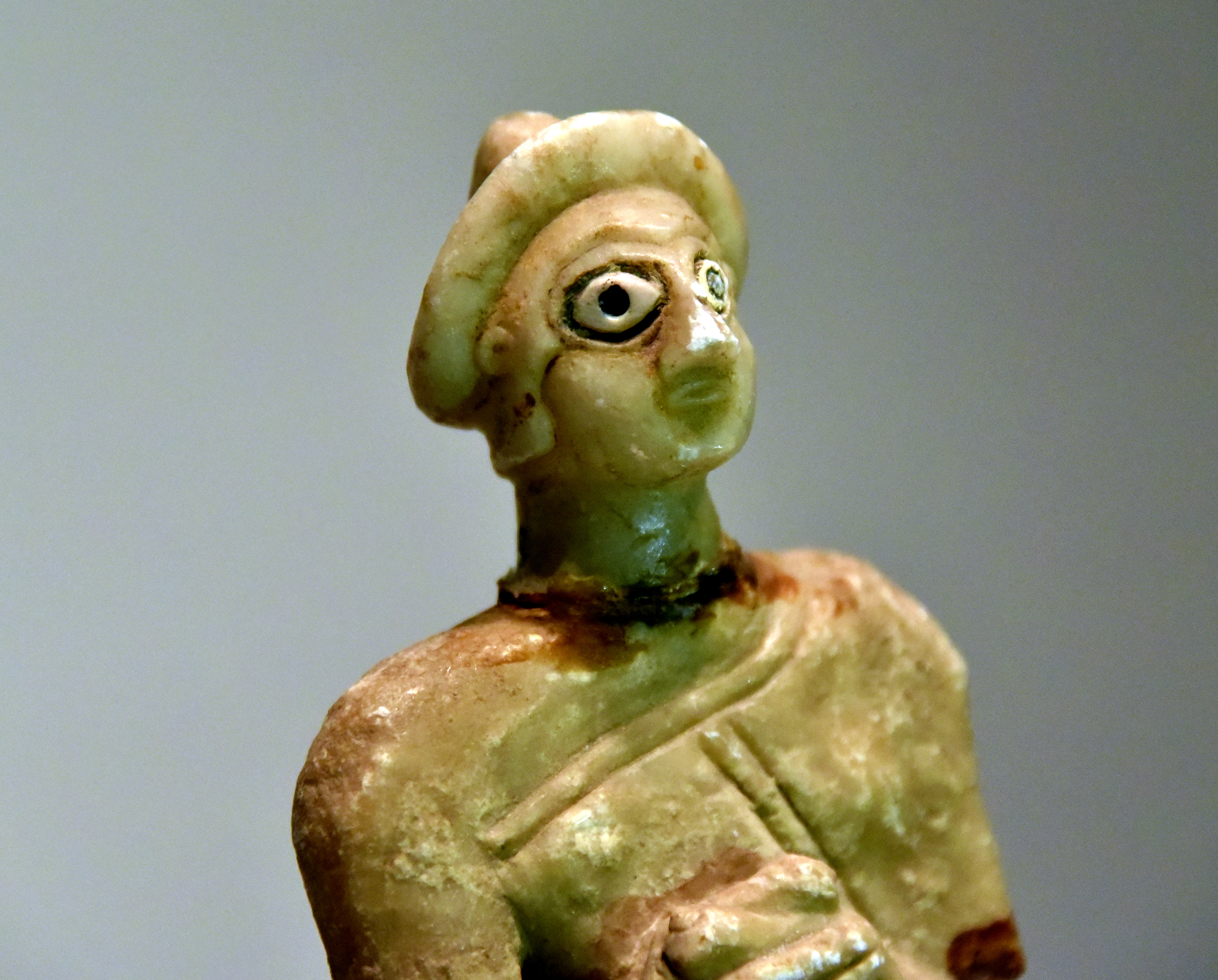
The head of this Sumerian female was excavated at Khafajah by the Oriental Institute, now in the Slemani Museum, Iraqi Kurdistan

The ISAC Museum has artifacts from digs in Egypt, Israel, Syria, Turkey, Iraq, and Iran. Notable works in the collection include the famous Megiddo Ivories; various treasures from Persepolis, the old Persian capital; a collection of Luristan Bronzes; a colossal 40-ton Lamassu from Khorsabad, the capital of Sargon II; and a monumental statue of King Tutankhamun. The museum has free admission, although visitors are encouraged to donate.

The Institute for the Study of Ancient Cultures, West Asia & North Africa is a center of active research on the ancient Near East. The building's upper floors contain a library, classrooms and faculty offices, and its gift shop, the Suq, also sells textbooks for the university's classes on Near Eastern studies. In addition to carrying out many digs in the Fertile Crescent, institute scholars have made contributions to the understanding of the origins of human civilization. The term "Fertile Crescent" was coined by J. H. Breasted, who popularized the connection of the rise of civilization in the Near East with the development of European culture.

In 2011, among other projects institute scholars completed publication of the 21-volume Chicago Assyrian Dictionary, a basic cultural reference work. The effort was begun in 1921 by J. H. Breasted, and continued by Edward Chiera and Ignace Gelb, with the first volume published in 1956. Erica Reiner as editor-in-charge led the research teams for 44 years. She was succeeded by Martha T. Roth, dean of humanities at the university. Similar dictionaries are under way, including the Chicago Hittite Dictionary and the Chicago Demotic Dictionary.

=== Chicago House ===
The Institute oversees the work of Chicago House in Luxor, Egypt. The Egyptian facility, established in 1924, performs the Epigraphic Survey, which documents and researches the historical sites in Luxor. It also manages conservation at various sites.

== Persian tablets lawsuit ==
In 2006, the Institute for the Study of Ancient Cultures was the center of a controversy when a United States federal court lawsuit sought to seize and auction a valuable collection of ancient Persian tablets held by the museum. The proceeds were to compensate the victims of a 1997 bombing in Ben Yehuda Street, Jerusalem, an attack which the United States claimed was funded by Iran. The ruling threatened sale of an invaluable collection of ancient clay tablets, held by the Oriental Institute since the 1930s, but owned by Iran. The Achaemenid (or Persepolis) clay tablets were loaned for study to the University of Chicago in 1937. They were uncovered in Persepolis, Iran by American archaeologists from the university in 1933 and are legally the property of the National Museum of Iran and Iran's Ministry of Cultural Heritage, Tourism and Handicrafts. The artifacts were loaned for study based on the understanding that they would be returned to Iran, which the Oriental Institute had done in batches over the years. The tablets, from Persepolis, the capital of the Achaemenid Empire, date to about 500 BCE.

The tablets give a view of daily life, itemizing such elements as the daily rations of barley given to workers in nearby regions of the empire. The tablets were sent to the capital to provide a record of what they were paying workers. Gil Stein, former director of the Oriental Institute, said that details largely concern food for people on diplomatic or military missions. Each tablet is about half the size of a deck of playing cards and has characters of a dialect of Elamite, an extinct language understood by perhaps a dozen scholars in the world.

Stein described the tablets as providing "the first chance to hear the Persians speaking of their own empire". Charles Jones, Research Associate and Librarian at the Oriental Institute and tablet expert, compared them to "credit card receipts". Most current knowledge about the ancient Persian empire comes from the accounts of others, most famously the Greek storyteller Herodotus. Stein added: "It's valuable because it's a group of tablets, thousands of them from the same archive. It's like the same filing cabinet. They're very, very valuable scientifically." The Oriental Institute has been returning them to Iran in small batches. Since the 1930s, the Oriental Institute had returned several hundred tablets and fragments to Iran and were preparing another shipment when the legal action began. An appeals court later overturned the order of seizure, and in 2018, the Supreme Court of the United States affirmed the subsequent ruling that the collection cannot be taken from the Oriental Institute to satisfy the judgment.

The Institute's research on the tablets and what they say about life in Persepolis continued and was featured in the documentary series Ancient Megacities in 2024.

== List of directors ==
No.	Name	From	To
1	James Henry Breasted	July 1, 1919	December 2, 1935
acting	John Albert Wilson	January 14, 1936	June 30, 1936
2	John Albert Wilson	July 1, 1936	November 30, 1946
acting	Harold Hayden Nelson	1942	1943
3	Thorkild Peter Rudolph Jacobsen	December 1, 1946	January 31, 1950
4	Carl Hermann Kraeling	February 1, 1950	June 30, 1960
acting	John Albert Wilson	July 1, 1960	June 30, 1961
acting	Emery Thomas Filbey	July 1, 1961	May 31, 1962
5	Robert McCormick Adams	May 4, 1962	June 30, 1968
6	George Robert Hughes	July 1, 1968	June 30, 1972
7	John Anthony Brinkman	July 1, 1972	June 30, 1981
8	Robert McCormick Adams (Note: This was Robert McCormick Adams' second term; he previously served as the Institute's 5th Director from 1962 to 1968.)	July 1, 1981	June 30, 1983
9	Janet Helen Johnson	July 1, 1983	September 30, 1989
10	William Marvin Sumner	October 1, 1989	September 30, 1997
11	Gene B. Gragg	October 1, 1997	June 30, 2002
12	Gil Stein	July 1, 2002	June 30, 2017
13	Christopher Woods	July 1, 2017	April 30, 2021
14 (Note: Although Theo Van Den Hout was appointed Interim Director from 2021 to 2023, unlike previous unnumbered Acting Directors, he was officially numbered as the 14th Director, according to the Institute's official website.) interim	Theo Van Den Hout (Note: During Theo Van Den Hout's directorship, in April 2023, the Institute was renamed from the Oriental Institute to the Institute for the Study of Ancient Cultures, West Asia and North Africa.)	April 1, 2021	August 31, 2023
15	Timothy P. Harrison	September 1, 2023	incumbent

(Source)

== Gallery ==
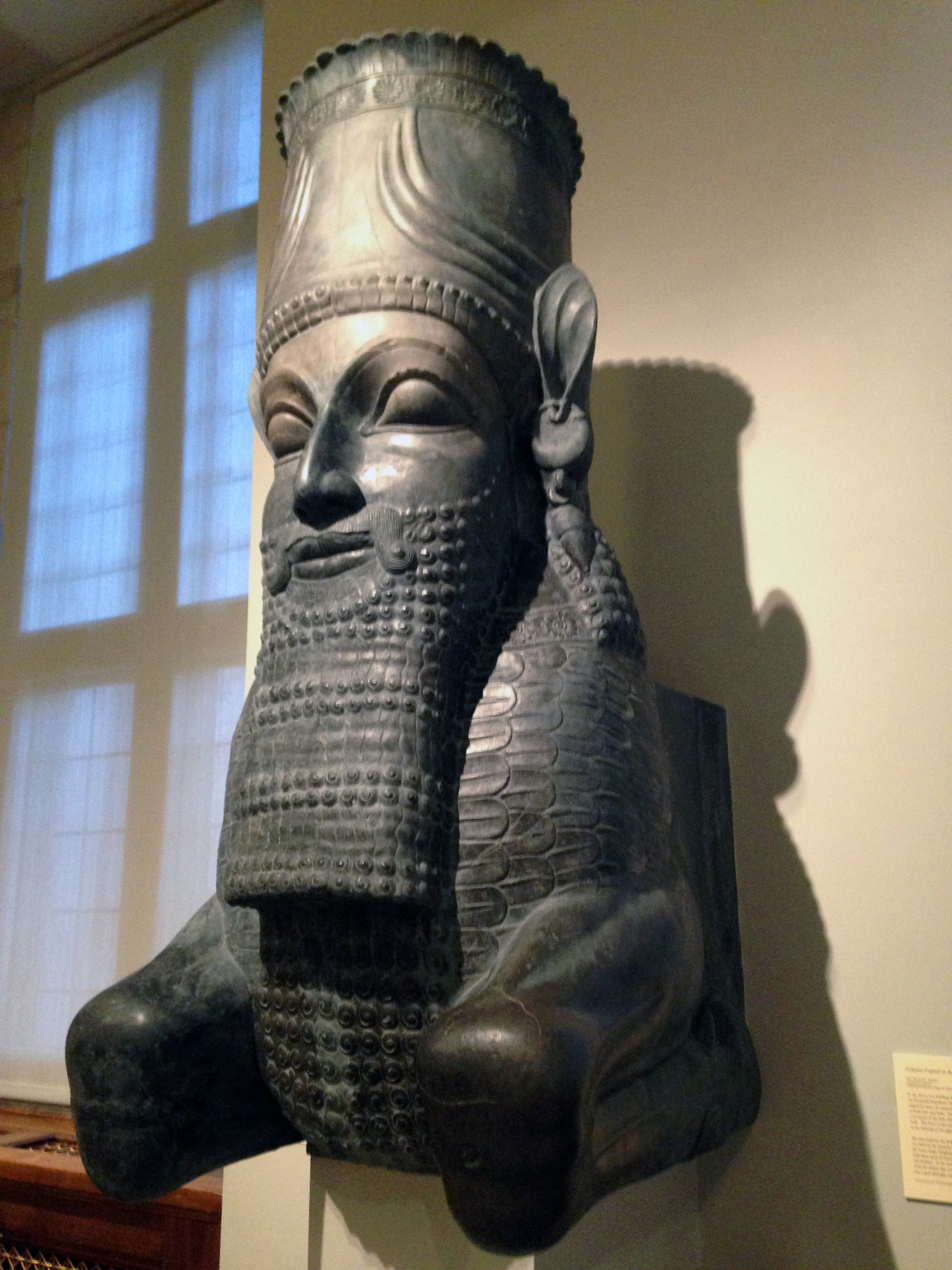
Reconstructed headstone from Persepolis

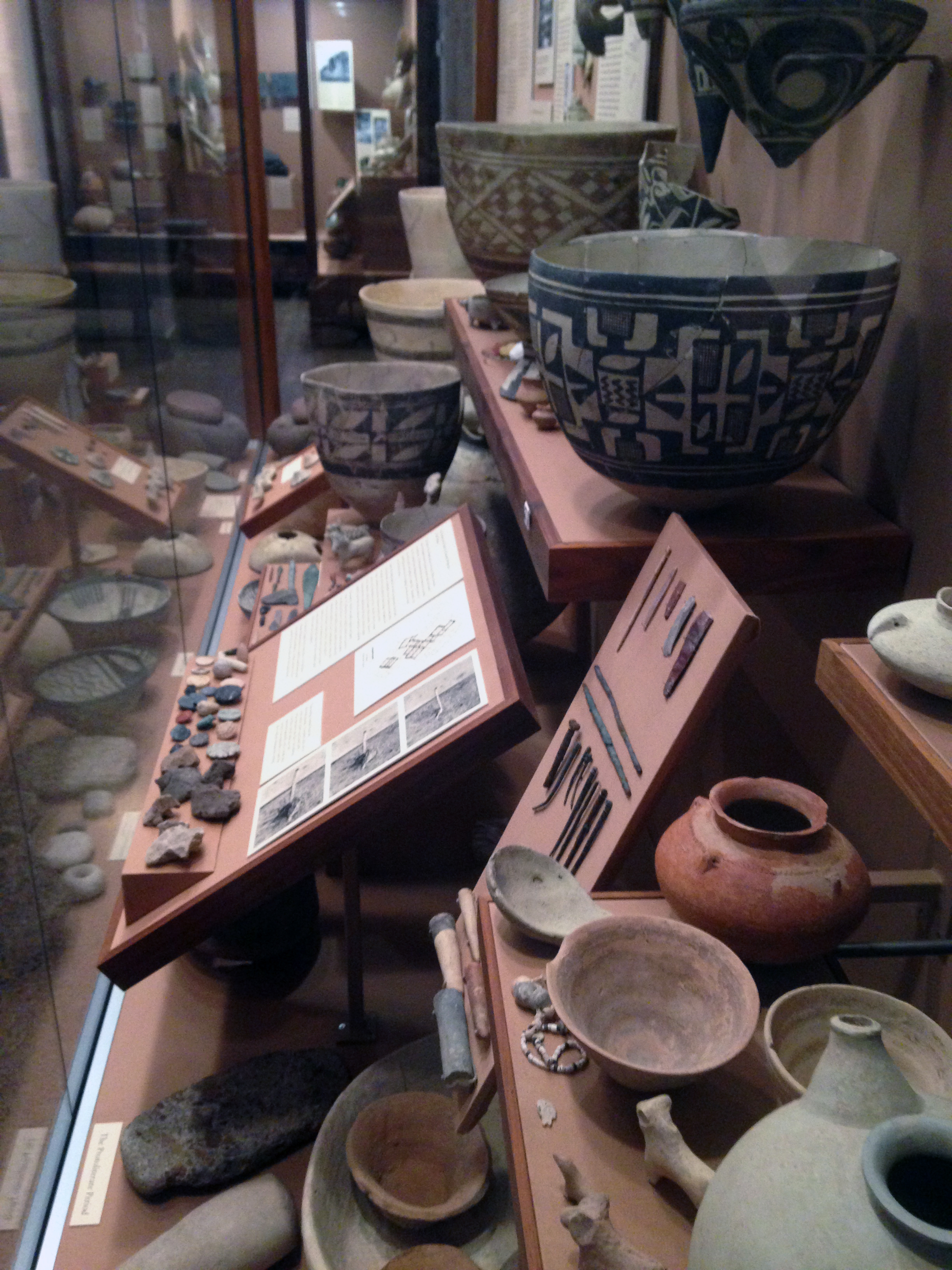
Prehistoric objects

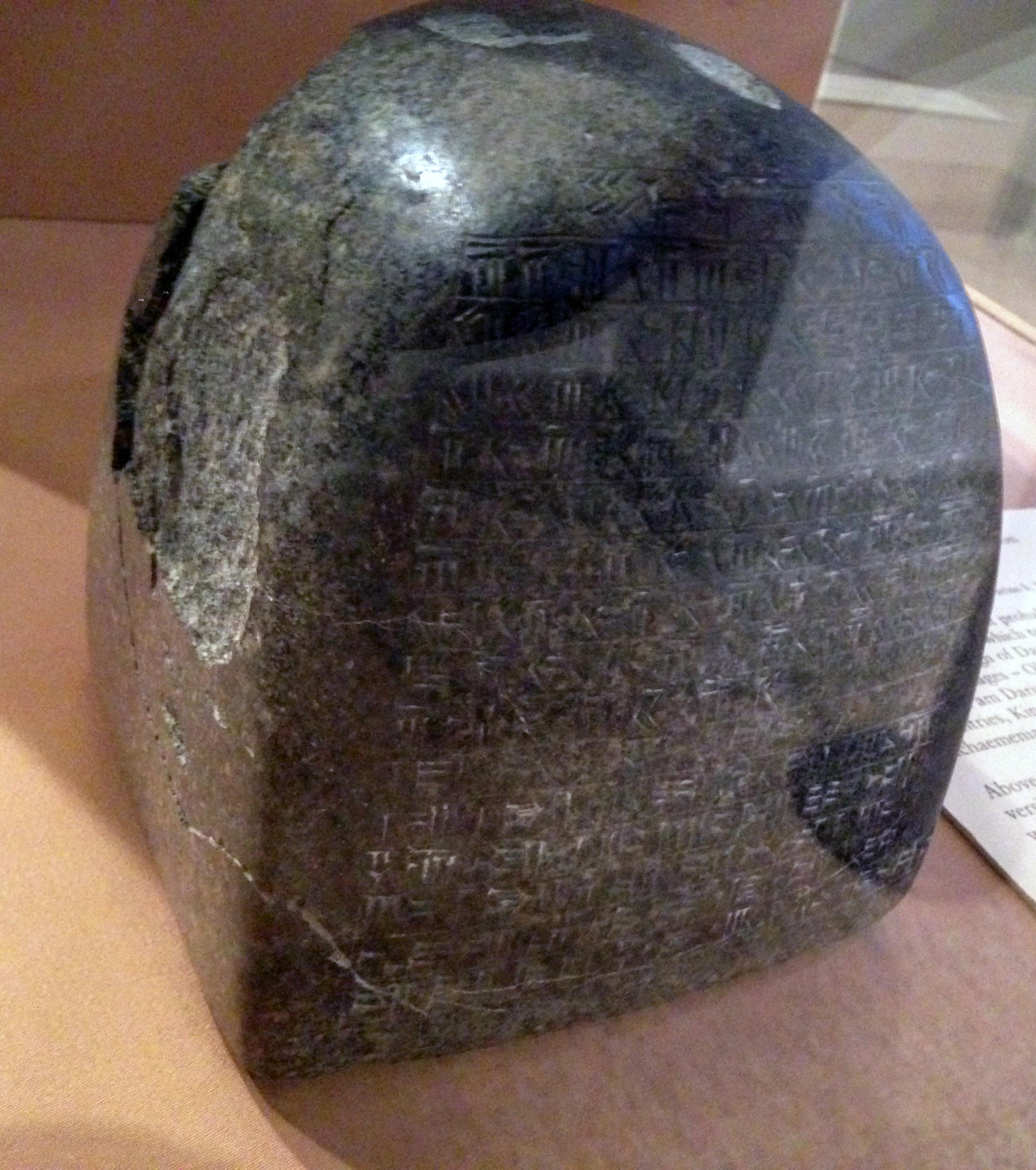
Standard weight of the Achaemenid period

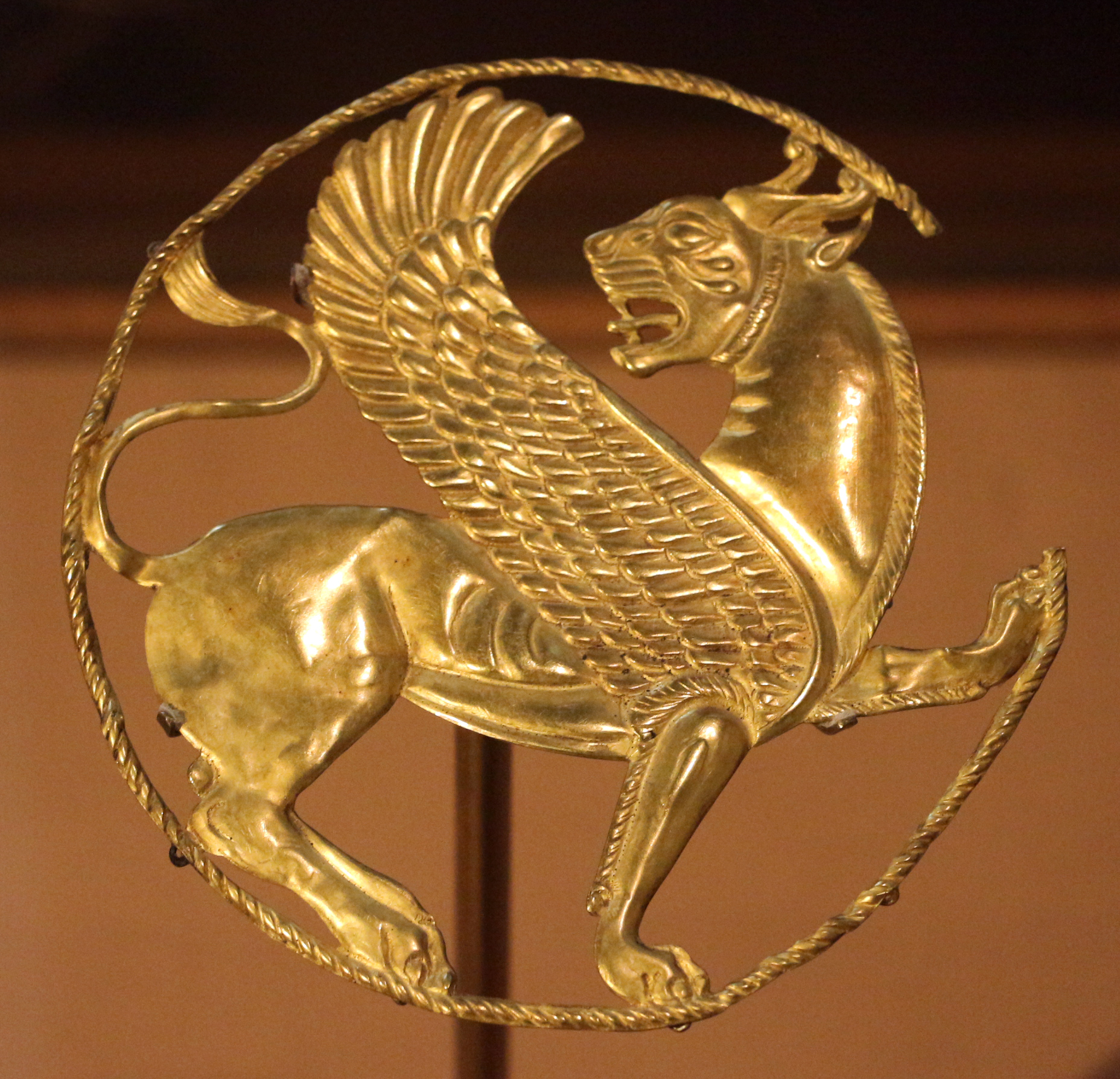
Golden winged lion

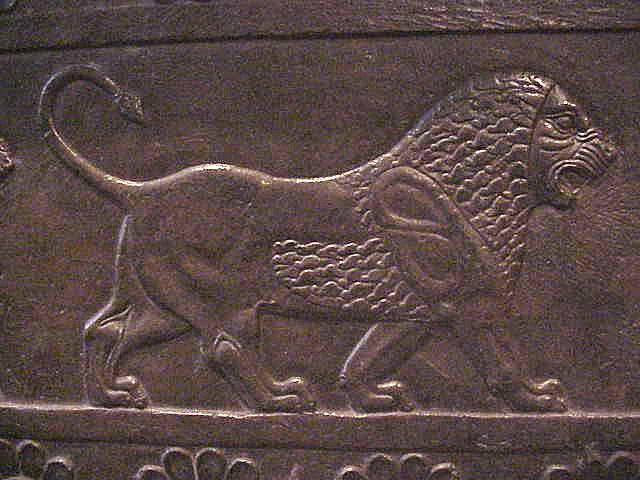
Engraving of a lion on a wall from Persepolis

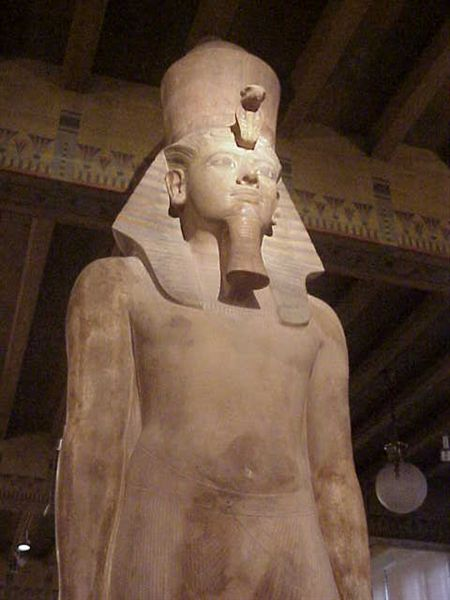
A colossal statue of Tutankhamun from ancient Egypt

== See also ==
- Papyrus Oxyrhynchus 54
- Papyrus Oxyrhynchus 69
- Papyrus Oxyrhynchus 72
- Papyrus Oxyrhynchus 75
