= List of Assyriologists =

This is a partial list of Assyriologists. An Assyriologist is a person who specializes in the archaeological, historical, cultural and linguistic study of Assyria and the rest of ancient Mesopotamia (Iraq).

== A ==
- Arthur Amiaud (French, 1849–1889), known for early researches into Babylonian and Assyrian inscriptions.

== B ==
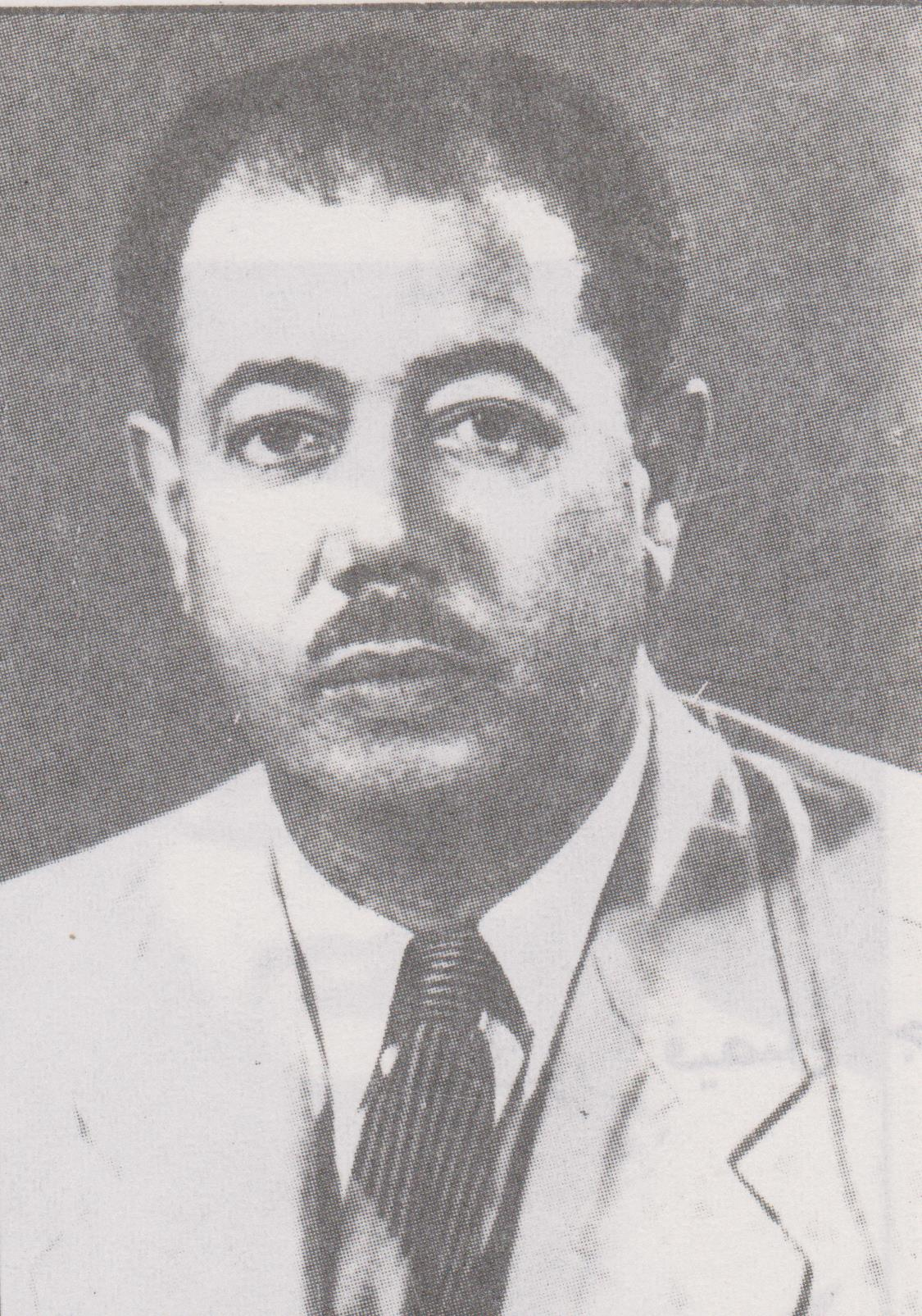
Taha Baqir translated the Epic of Gilgamesh from Akkadian into Arabic

- Zainab Bahrani (Iraqi, born 1962), Professor of Ancient Near Eastern Art and Archaeology at Columbia University.
- Taha Baqir (Iraqi, 1912–1984), former curator of the National Museum of Iraq, translated the Epic of Gilgamesh into Arabic.
- Paul-Alain Beaulieu (Canadian, born 1955), Professor of Near and Middle Eastern Civilizations at the University of Toronto.
- Behnam Abu Alsoof (Iraqi, 1931–2012), anthropologist, historian and writer, known for excavations in the Tigris valley.
- Carl Bezold (German, 1859–1922), known primarily for research in Akkadian, catalogued the Library of Ashurbanipal.
- Robert D. Biggs (American, born 1934), editor of the Journal of Near Eastern Studies.
- Riekele Borger (Dutch, 1929–2010), famous for his cuneiform sign lists.
- Jean Bottéro (French, 1914–2007), expert on the Ancient Near East.

== C ==
- Dominique Charpin (French, born 1954), professor at the Collège de France specializing in the "Old-Babylonian" period.
- Henry Adrian Churchill (British, 1828–1886), diplomat and archaeological explorer of ancient Mesopotamia.
- Muazzez İlmiye Çığ (Turkish, 1914–2024), archaeologist specialising in Sumerian civilisation.
- Miguel Civil (American, 1926–2019), expert on Sumer (including the Sumerian language) and Ancient Mesopotamian studies at the University of Chicago.
- Albert T. Clay (American, 1866–1925), professor at Yale University, historian and expert on Semitic languages.

== D ==
- Stephanie Dalley (British, born 1943), known for cuneiform texts and investigation of the Hanging Gardens of Babylon.
- Friedrich Delitzsch (German, 1850–1922), expert on Middle Eastern languages who maintained that much of Old Testament was derived from ancient Babylonian tales.
- Manfried Manfried Dietrich (German, born 1935), known for Ugaritic studies and the foundation of Ugarit-Verlag.
- Georges Dossin (Belgian, 1896–1983), archaeologist who worked on excavation of sites in Syria.
- Jean-Marie Durand (French, born 1940), whose research mainly concerns texts found in the ruins of the ancient city of Mari.

== E ==
- Dietz Otto Edzard (German, 1930–2004), scholar of the Ancient Near East and grammarian of the Sumerian language.
- Joseph Epping (German, 1835–1894), astronomer who undertook a mathematical investigation of the Babylonian astronomical observations and tables.

== F ==
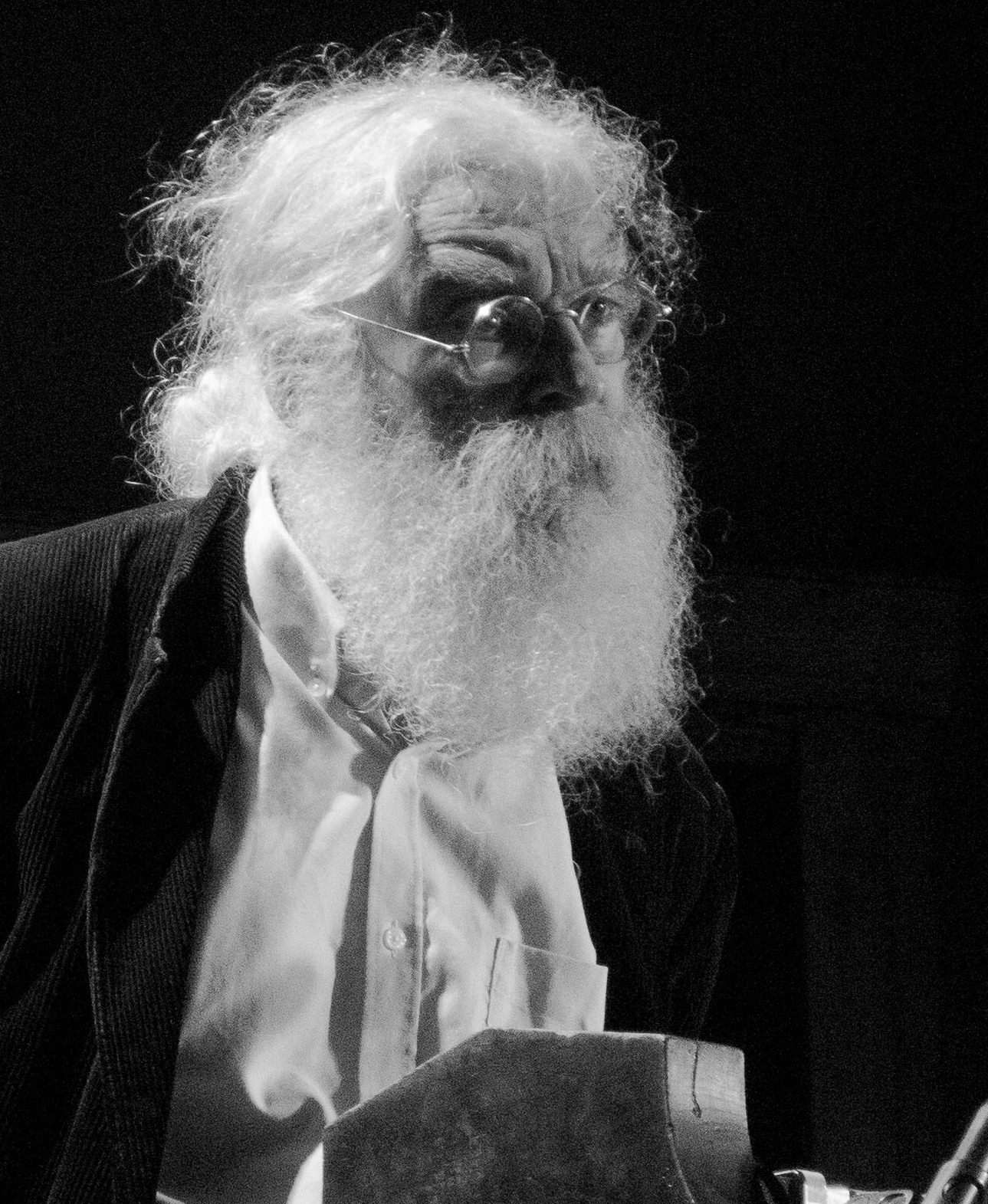
Irving Finkel curates some ~130,000 cuneiform clay tablets housed in the British Museum

- Irving Finkel (British, born 1951), philologist who specializes in cuneiform inscriptions on clay tablets from ancient Mesopotamia.
- Daniel E. Fleming (American, born 1957), biblical scholar whose work centres on Hebrew Bible interpretation.
- Fulgence Fresnel (French, 1795–1855), Orientalist scholar who led one of the first archaeological teams to excavate in Mesopotamia.

== G ==
- Gwendolyn Leick
- Lamia Al-Gailani Werr (Iraqi, 1938–2019), specialist in ancient Mesopotamian antiquities.
- Paul Garelli (French, 1924–2006), lecturer and professor at the Sorbonne who taught history of the peoples of the Semitic East.
- Joseph Étienne Gautier (French, 1861–1924), archaeologist who uncovered several overlapping stages of cultures that predated the time of Sargon of Akkad.
- Andrew R. George (British, born 1955), linguist who translated and annotated of the Epic of Gilgamesh.
- Ignace Gelb (Polish, American, 1907–1985), linguist who published editions of Akkadian texts and a grammar and dictionary of Old Akkadian
- Jean-Jacques Glassner (French, born 1944), historian specializing in the Mesopotamian world and cuneiform script.
- Georg Friedrich Grotefend (German, 1775–1853), epigraphist and philologist known for his contributions to deciphering cuneiform.
- Oliver Gurney (British, 1911–2001), expert on the Hittites.

== H ==
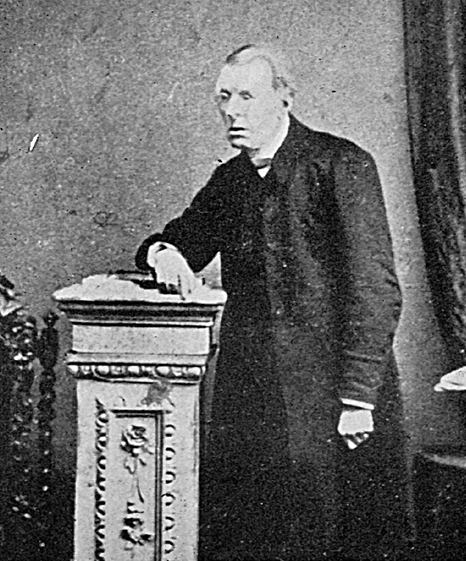
Edward Hincks, one of the decipherers of the cuneiform writing system

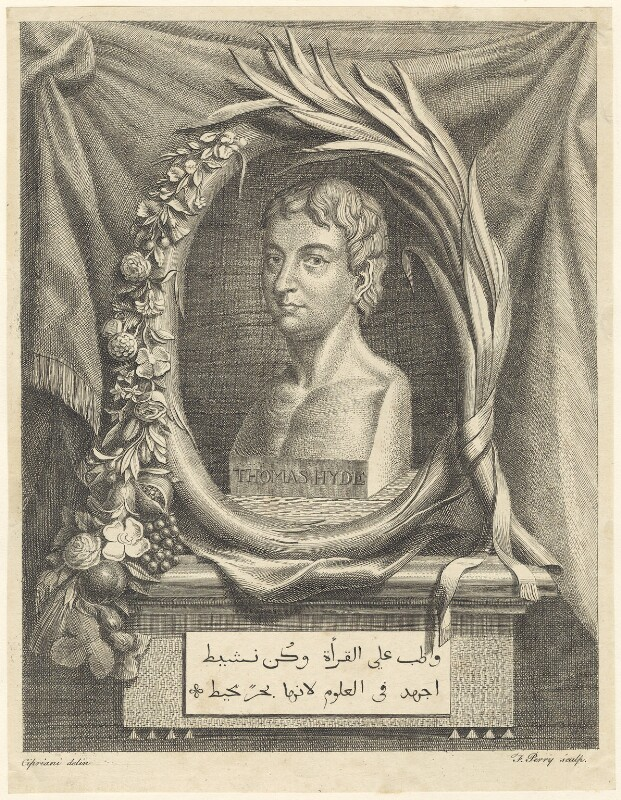
Thomas Hyde, who attempted to correct from Oriental sources the errors of the Greek and Roman historians

- Joseph Halévy (Ottoman-French, 1827–1917), Orientalist and traveller who crossed Yemen in search of Sabaean inscriptions.
- William W. Hallo (German-American, 1928–2015), professor of Assyriology and Babylonian Literature, and curator of the Babylonian collection at Yale University.
- Richard Hallock (American, 1906-1980), former editorial secretary of the Chicago Assyrian Dictionary
- Hendrik Arent Hamaker (Dutch, 1789–1835), philologist and Orientalist who worked on Oriental languages.
- Paul Haupt (German-American, 1858–1926), Semitic scholar, one of the pioneers of Assyriology in the United States.
- Hermann Volrath Hilprecht (German-American, 1859–1925), archaeologist who carried out excavations in Iraq.
- Edward Hincks (Irish, 1792–1866), one of the decipherers of Mesopotamian cuneiform.
- Paul Y. Hoskisson (American, born 1943), professor of Ancient scripture who has published research on the Book of Mormon and the Old Testament.
- Thomas Hyde (English, 1636–1703), Orientalist and linguist who mastered Turkish, Arabic, Syriac, Persian, Hebrew and Malay, and coined the word "cuneiform".

== J ==
- Thorkild Jacobsen (Danish, 1904—1993), director of the Chicago Oriental Institute and professor of Assyriology at Harvard University, produced an English translation of the Sumerian King List.
- Liane Jakob-Rost (German, born 1928), focussed on editing and publishing cuneiform sources in the collection of the Vorderasiatisches Museum Berlin.
- Morris Jastrow Jr. (Polish-American, 1861–1921), Orientalist and librarian who made linguistic studies of Semitic languages.
- Alfred Jeremias (German, 1864–1935), pastor and expert on the religions of the ancient Near East.
- Claude Hermann Walter Johns (British, 1857–1920), lecturer in Assyriology at Cambridge University, as well as in Assyrian at King's College, London.

== K ==
- Thomas Richard Kämmerer (German, 1962), Assyriologist and publisher Ugarit-Verlag.
- Karlheinz Kessler (German, 1948), Referent in Baghdad DAI, Professor of Assyriology at the Erlangen-Nürnberg University, historical topography of Eastern Turkey and Syria, editor of tablets from various periods Uruk.
- Bahija Khalil Ismail (Iraqi, 1934–2019), former director of the Iraq Museum.
- Leonard William King (British, 1869–1919), archaeologist known for his translations of ancient works such as the Code of Hammurabi.
- Samuel Noah Kramer (Russian-American, 1897–1990), considered an expert in Sumerian history and language, he studied the Lament for Ur and other texts.
- Franz Xaver Kugler (German, 1862–1929), mathematician who studied cuneiform tablets and Babylonian astronomy, and worked out the Babylonian theories on the Moon and planets.

== L ==
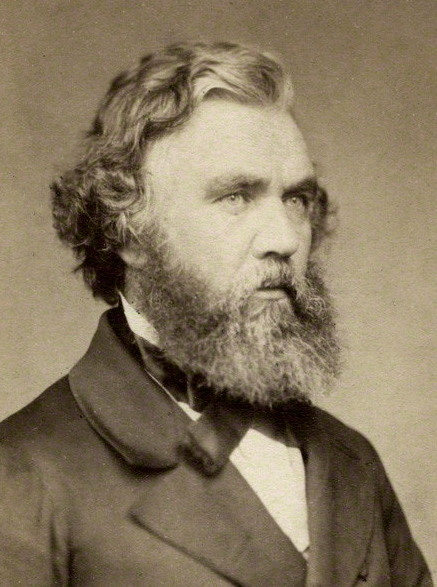
Austen Henry Layard, who uncovered the Lion Hunt of Ashurbanipal at Nineveh in 1851

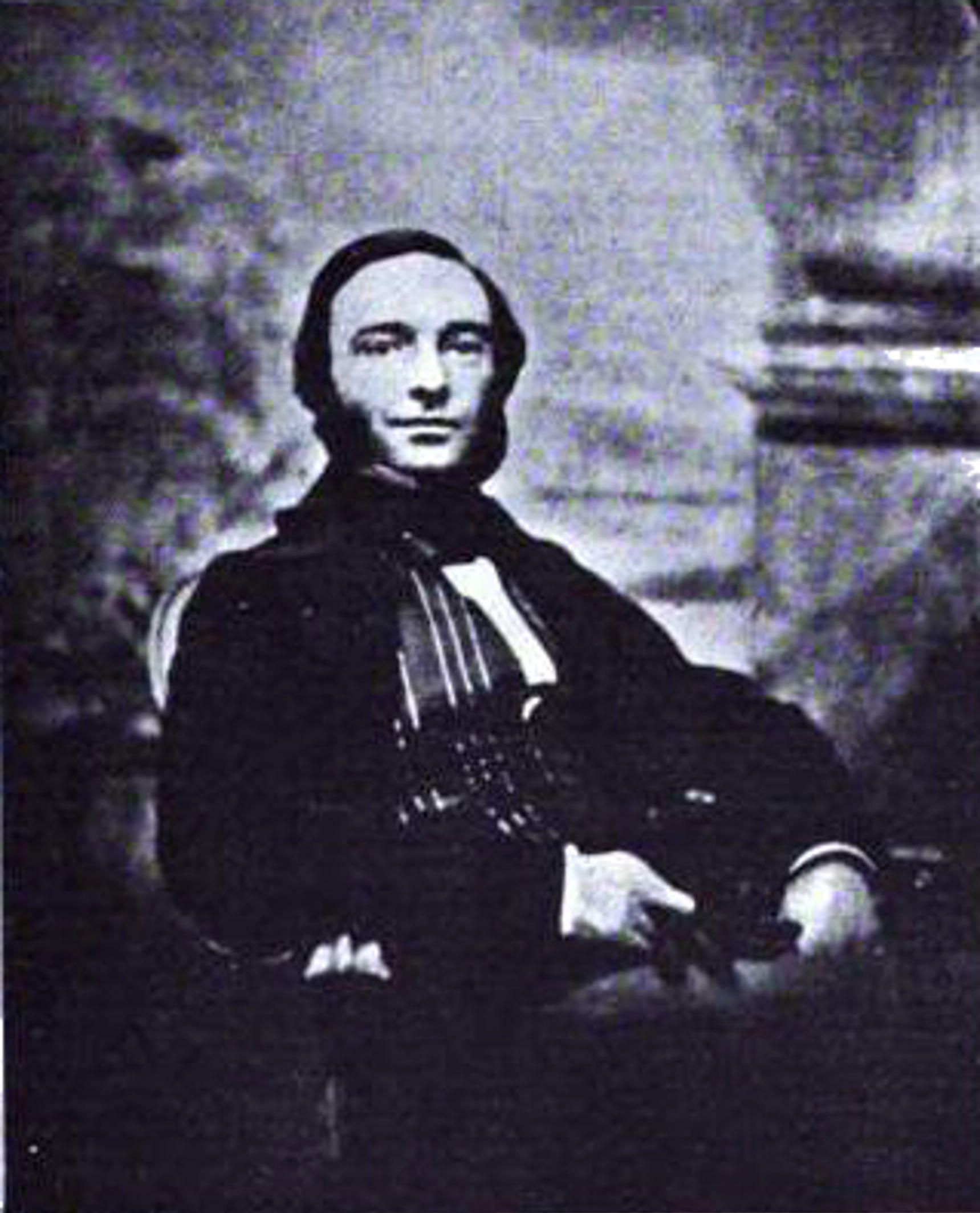
William Loftus, who discovered the Sumerian city of Uruk in 1849

- Wilfred G. Lambert (British, 1926–2011), historian and archaeologist, a specialist in Assyriology and Near Eastern Archaeology.
- Emmanuel Laroche (French, 1914–1991), linguist and Hittitologist, expert in the languages of ancient Anatolia (Indo-European and Hurrian).
- Austen Henry Layard (British, 1817–1894), traveller best known as the excavator of Nimrud and of Nineveh in 1851.
- Gwendolyn Leick (Austrian-British, born 1951), author of books and encyclopaedias about ancient Mesopotamia.
- François Lenormant (French, 1837–1883), Hellenist and archaeologist, among the first to recognize in the cuneiform inscriptions the existence of a non-Semitic language he named Akkadian.
- Hildegard Lewy (American, 1903–1969), specialist in cuneiform texts and Babylonian mathematics.
- William Loftus (British, 1820–1858) geologist, naturalist, explorer and archaeological excavator who discovered the ancient Sumerian city of Uruk in 1849.
- Jørgen Læssøe (Danish, 1924–1993), excavator of Tell Shemshara and author of several popular history books on Assyriology in Danish

== M ==
- Khazal Al Majidi (Iraqi and Dutch, born 1951), specialist in the science and history of ancient religions and civilizations.
- Stefan Maul (German, born 1958), head of the research unit of the Heidelberg Academy of Sciences "Edition of literary cuneiform texts from Assur".
- Joachim Menant (French, 1820–1899), lawyer and Orientalist known for his studies on cuneiform inscriptions.
- Cécile Michel (French, born 1962), epigrapher and archaeologist who works on deciphering the cuneiform tablets discovered at Kültepe.
- Alan Millard (British, born 1937), Professor of Hebrew and Ancient Semitic languages who rediscovered the Epic of Atrahasis.
- William L. Moran (American, 1921–2000), Professor of Assyriology at Harvard University, expert on the Akkadian language

== N ==
- Edwin Norris (British, 1795–1872), philologist who deciphered the Assyrian lion weights from Nineveh and discovered the weight measurement system of this civilization.

== O ==
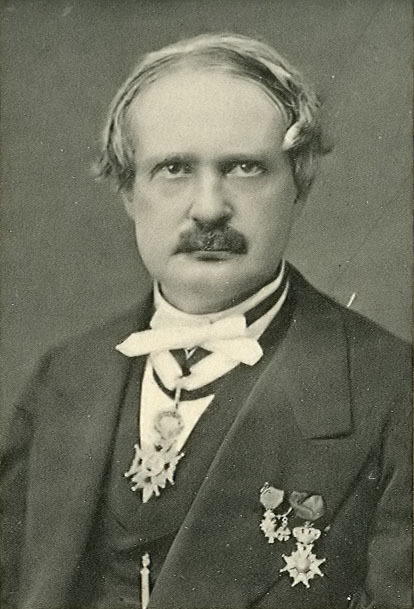
Julius Oppert wrote an Assyrian grammar in 1868

- Michael Patrick O'Connor (American, 1950–2007), linguist of Semitic languages, with a focus on biblical Hebrew and biblical poetry.
- Albert T. Olmstead (American, 1880-1945), Professor of Oriental History at the Oriental Institute of the University of Chicago.
- Julius Oppert (French-German, 1825–1905), linguist who argued that the language spoken originally in Assyria was Turanian (related to Turkish and Mongolian).

== P ==
- Johannes Hendricus van der Palm (Dutch, 1763–1840), professor of Oriental languages and Hebrew antiquities.
- Barbara Parker-Mallowan (British, 1908–1993), archaeologist and epigraphist who specialized in cylinder seals.
- Simo Parpola (Finnish, born 1943), expert on the Neo-Assyrian Empire in all its aspects (language, literature, history etc.)
- Theophilus Pinches (British, 1856–1934), pioneer Assyriologist who translated some Babylonian tablets related to the Battle of the Vale of Siddim.
- Henri Pognon (French, 1853–1921), archaeologist and epigrapher who collected Semitic inscriptions whose meaning he penetrated through an intense translation work.
- Nicholas Postgate (British, born 1945), former Director of the British School of Archaeology in Iraq, directed excavations at Abu Salabikh (Iraq) and Kilise Tepe (Turkey).
- Adrien Prévost de Longpérier (French, 1816–1882), numismatist, archaeologist and curator of antiquities who welcomed in the Louvre the first Assyrian sculptures that arrived in France from Khorsabad.

== R ==
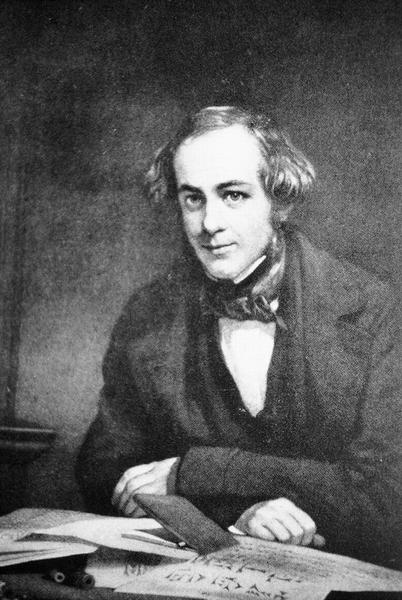
Sir Henry Rawlinson, 1st Baronet, called the "Father of Assyriology"

- Karen Radner (Austrian, born 1972), Professor of Ancient History at LMU Munich.
- Anson Rainey (American, 1930–2011), Professor of ancient Near Eastern cultures and Semitic linguistics, known for the study of the Amarna tablets.
- Hormuzd Rassam (Iraqi, British, 1826–1910), Assyriologist known for archaeological discoveries, including the clay tablets that contained the Epic of Gilgamesh.
- Otto E. Ravn (Danish, 1881–1952), professor at the University of Copenhagen.
- Sir Henry Rawlinson, 1st Baronet (British, 1810–1895), Orientalist who transcribed the Old Persian portion of the trilingual inscriptions in Old Persian, Elamite and Babylonian (a later form of Akkadian) written by Darius the Great.
- Erica Reiner (American, 1924–2005), editor of the Chicago Assyrian Dictionary, the basic reference work for understanding the Akkadian language.
- Claudius Rich (British, 1787–1821), traveller and antiquarian scholar who explored the remains of Babylon, and projected a geographical and statistical account of the pashalic of Baghdad.
- Michael Roaf (British, born 1947), archaeologist specializing in ancient Iranian studies and Assyriology.
- Eleanor Robson (British, born 1969), professor of ancient Middle Eastern history at University College London.
- Francesca Rochberg (American, born 1952), historian of science known for her work on the history of Babylonian astronomy.
- Georges Roux (French, 1914–1999), author of popular history books about the Ancient Near East: Ancient Iraq and La Mésopotamie.

== S ==
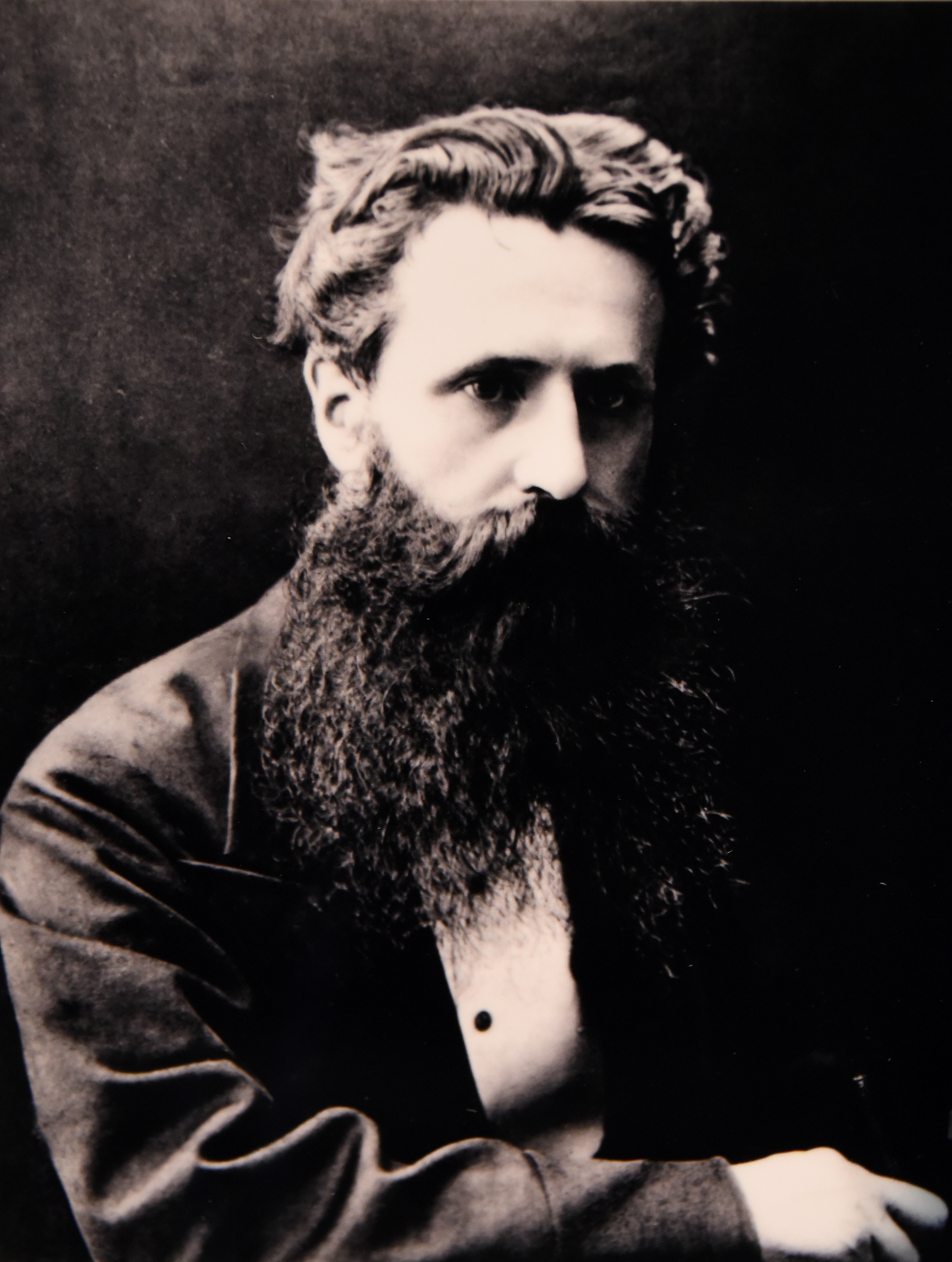
George Smith, the man who transliterated and read the "Babylonian Flood Story" of Tablet XI

- Abraham Sachs (American, 1915–1983), expert on Assyrian astronomy who studied Babylonian astronomical diaries in the British Museum.
- H. W. F. Saggs (British, 1920–2005), Classicist and Orientalist who participated in Max Mallowan's excavation at Nimrud.
- Walther Sallaberger (Austrian, born 1963), archaeologist and linguist who participated in excavations in Mosul and Borsippa (Iraq) and in Pergamon (Turkey).
- Armas Salonen (Finnish, 1915–1981), linguist who participated in the Chicago Assyrian Dictionary project and published the first Finnish translation of the Epic of Gilgamesh.
- Ernest de Sarzec (French, 1832–1901) archaeologist who discovered the civilization of ancient Sumer.
- Jules-Justin Sauveplane (French, 1862–1928), specialist of Biblical studies and of the ancient East who published one of the first French translations of the Epic of Gilgamesh.
- Archibald Sayce (British, 1845–1933), linguist able to write in at least twenty ancient and modern languages who emphasized the importance of archaeological and monumental evidence in linguistic research.
- Jean-Vincent Scheil (French, 1858–1940), scholar who discovered the Code of Hammurabi in Persia.
- Eberhard Schrader (German, 1836–1908), pioneer of the field of Assyriology in Germany.
- Giovanni Semerano (Italian, 1913–2005), philologist and linguist who studied the languages of Ancient Mesopotamia, and rejected the Indo-European theory.
- Shin Shifra (Israeli, 1931–2012), poet, translator, writer, editor and literary critic who published adaptations for children of the Sumerian and Akkadian cultural heritage.
- Åke W. Sjöberg (Swedish, 1924–2014), Assyriologist who specialized in Sumerian language and literature.
- George Smith (British, 1840–1876), pioneering Assyriologist who first discovered and translated the Epic of Gilgamesh.
- Wolfram von Soden (German, 1908–1996), scholar of ancient Semitic languages whose scholarship greatly influenced his field during the post World War II era.
- Matthew Stolper (American, born 1944), expert on Babylonian legal texts, currently involved in the Persepolis Fortification Project.
- Ephraim Avigdor Speiser (Polish, born American, 1902–1965), Assyriologist who discovered the Tepe Gawra (or “Great Mound”) in Mosul
- Vasily Struve (Soviet, 1889–1965), historian who studied the history and arts of Sumer, Babylonia, Assyria, the Hittite Empire and other civilizations of the Ancient Near East.
- Saana Svärd (Finnish, born 1977), expert on the cultural history of the Ancient Near East, most notably the Neo-Assyrian Empire, social and political power relations, and ancient concepts of gender.

== T ==
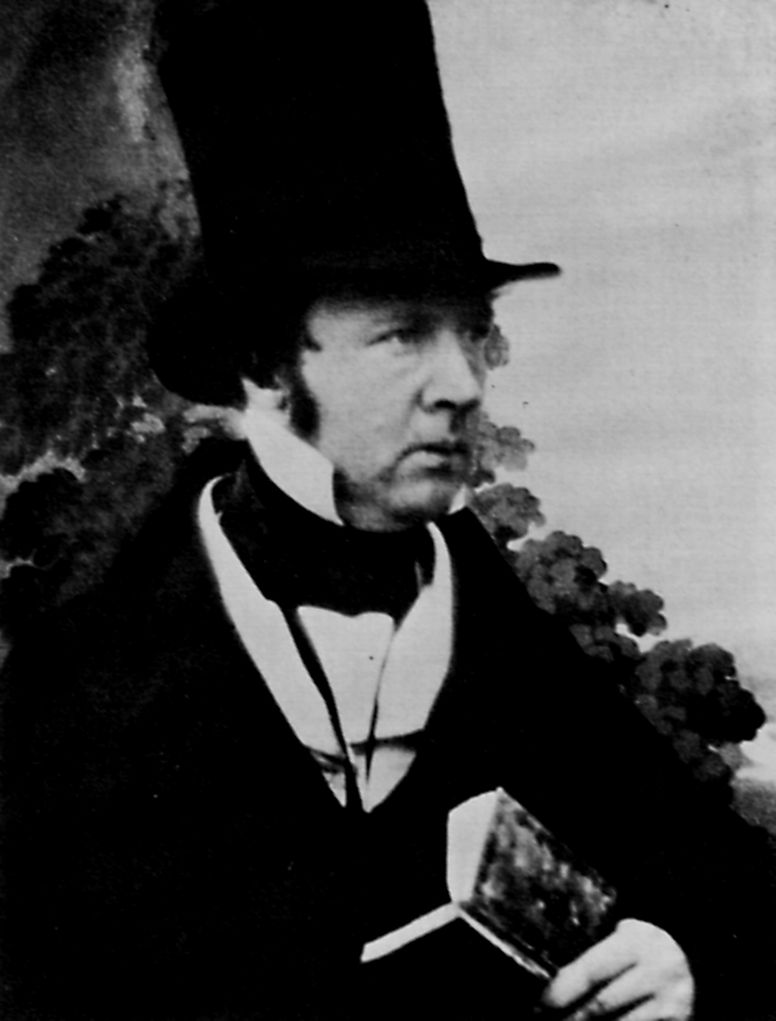
Henry Fox Talbot, a polymath, had a 20-year involvement in the field of Assyriology, and helped decipher the cuneiform inscriptions of Nineveh

- Hayim Tadmor (Israeli, 1923–2005), specialist in biblical history and Ancient Near Eastern History.
- Henry Fox Talbot (British, 1800–1877), scientist, inventor and photography pioneer who invented the salted paper and calotype processes, but was involved in many other subjects, including the decipherment of cuneiform.
- John George Taylor (British, fl. 1851–1861), early archaeologist who investigated antiquities of the Middle East and as one of the first archaeologists to explore the burial mounds near the Persian Gulf.
- Reginald Campbell Thompson (British, 1876–1941), excavated at Nineveh, Ur, Nebo and Carchemish, produced an early critical edition of Gilgamesh in 1930.
- Raymond-Jacques Tournay (French, 1912–1999), author of L'Épopée de Gilgamesh Introduction, traduction et notes.

== V ==
- Klaas Veenhof (Dutch, 1935–2023), professor at the University of Leiden, specialist in the Old-Babylonian time and the Old-Assyrian trade colonies such as Kanesh.

== W ==
- James Kinnier Wilson (British, 1921–2022), expert in Mesopotamian legends and epics, with an interest in the study of the organic and mental diseases of ancient Mesopotamia.
- Hugo Winckler (German, 1863–1913), archaeologist and historian who uncovered the capital of the Hittite Empire (Hattusa) at Boğazkale, Turkey, and student of the languages of the ancient Middle East,
- Donald Wiseman (British, 1918–2010), Professor of Assyriology at the University of London from 1961 to 1982, compiled a catalogue of the cuneiform tablets unearthed at Nimrud.

== Y ==
- Donny George Youkhanna (Iraqi, 1950–2011), archaeologist instrumental in recovering Mesopotamian artefacts looted from the National Museum in Baghdad during the American invasion of Iraq.

== Z ==
- Richard L. Zettler (American, born 1949), professor in the Department of Near Eastern Languages and Civilizations at the University of Pennsylvania, with special interests in urban development and the organization of complex societies in Early Bronze-Age Mesopotamia.

== See also ==
- List of archaeologists
- List of historians
- List of linguists
- List of Egyptologists

== Sources ==
- Budge, E. A. Wallis (1925). The Rise and Progress of Assyriology. London: Richard Clay & Sons, Limited.
- Kramer, Samuel Noah (1963). The Sumerians: Their History, Culture, and Character. Chicago & London: The University of Chicago Press.
