= Hilgert (disambiguation) =

Hilgert is an Ortsgemeinde in the Westerwaldkreis in Rhineland-Palatinate, Germany.

Hilgert may also refer to:

- Ivan Hilgert, former Czechoslovak slalom canoeist
- John Hilgert (born 1964), American politician from Nebraska
- Luboš Hilgert (disambiguation), several people
- Markus Hilgert (born 1969), German Assyriologist

== See also ==
- Ovambo sparrowhawk, AKA Hilgert's sparrowhawk
