= Hingert =

Hingert is a surname. Notable people with the surname include:

- Jack Hingert (born 1990), Australian-English soccer player
- Maureen Hingert (1937–2025), Sri Lankan dancer, model, actress, and beauty pageant title-holder

== See also ==
- Hilgert (disambiguation)
