= Leick =

Leick is a surname. Notable people with the surname include:

- Carl W. Leick (1854–1939), American architect
- Gwendolyn Leick (born 1951), Austrian British historian, Assyriologist, and weightlifter
- Hudson Leick (born 1969), American actress
