= Friedrich Delitzsch =

German Assyriologist (1850–1922)

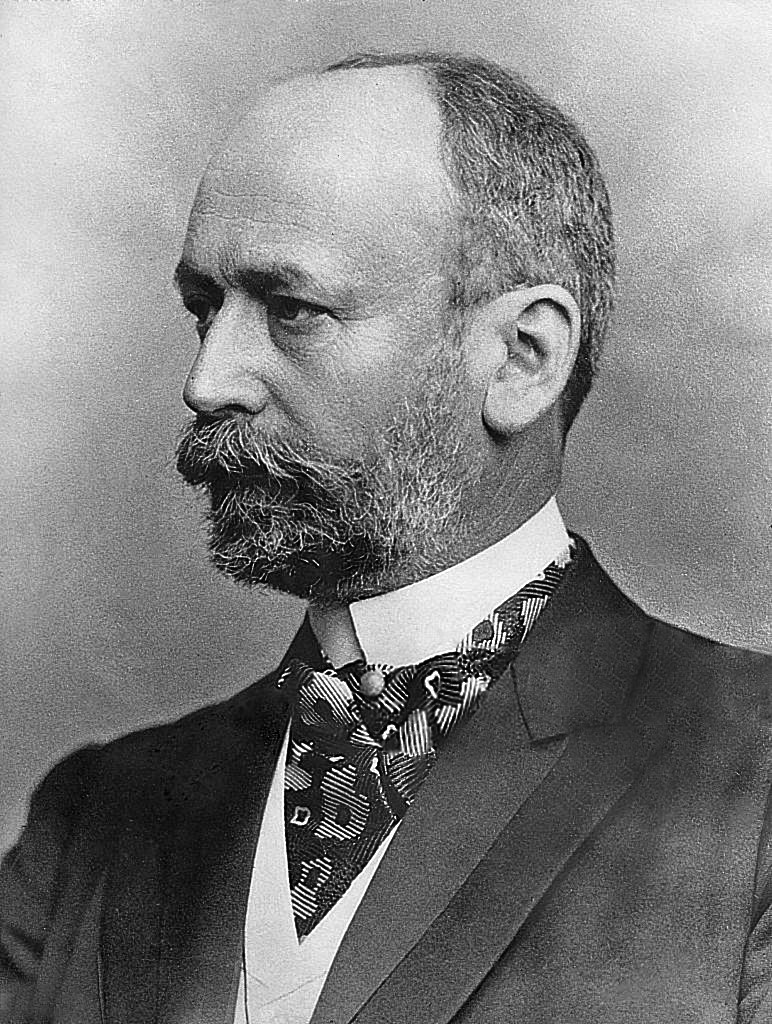
- Delitzsch in 1903
- Born: 3 September 1850; Erlangen, Kingdom of Bavaria
- Died: 19 December 1922 (aged 72); Langenschwalbach, Weimar Republic (now Bad Schwalbach, Germany)
- Father: Franz Delitzsch

Academic background
- Education: University of Leipzig
- Thesis: Studien über Indogermanisch-Semitische Wurzelverwandtschaft ('Studies on Indo-European–Semitic Root Relationships', 1873)

Academic work
- Discipline: Assyriology
- Institutions: University of Leipzig; University of Berlin; University of Breslau
- Notable students: Paul Haupt; H. V. Hilprecht; Heinrich Zimmern; Carl Bezold; Fritz Hommel

Friedrich Conrad Gerhard Delitzsch (German: [ˈfʁiːdʁɪç ˈdeːlɪtʃ]; 3 September 1850 – 19 December 1922) was a German Assyriologist. He was the son of Lutheran theologian Franz Delitzsch (1813–1890).

Born in Erlangen, he studied in Leipzig and Berlin, gaining his habilitation in 1874 as a lecturer of Semitic languages and Assyriology in Leipzig. In 1885, he became a full professor at Leipzig, afterwards serving as a professor at the Universities of Breslau (1893) and Berlin (1899).

He was co-founder of the Deutsche Orient-Gesellschaft (German Oriental Society) and director of the Vorderasiatische Abteilung (Near Eastern Department) of the Royal Museums.

== Bible-Babel Controversy ==
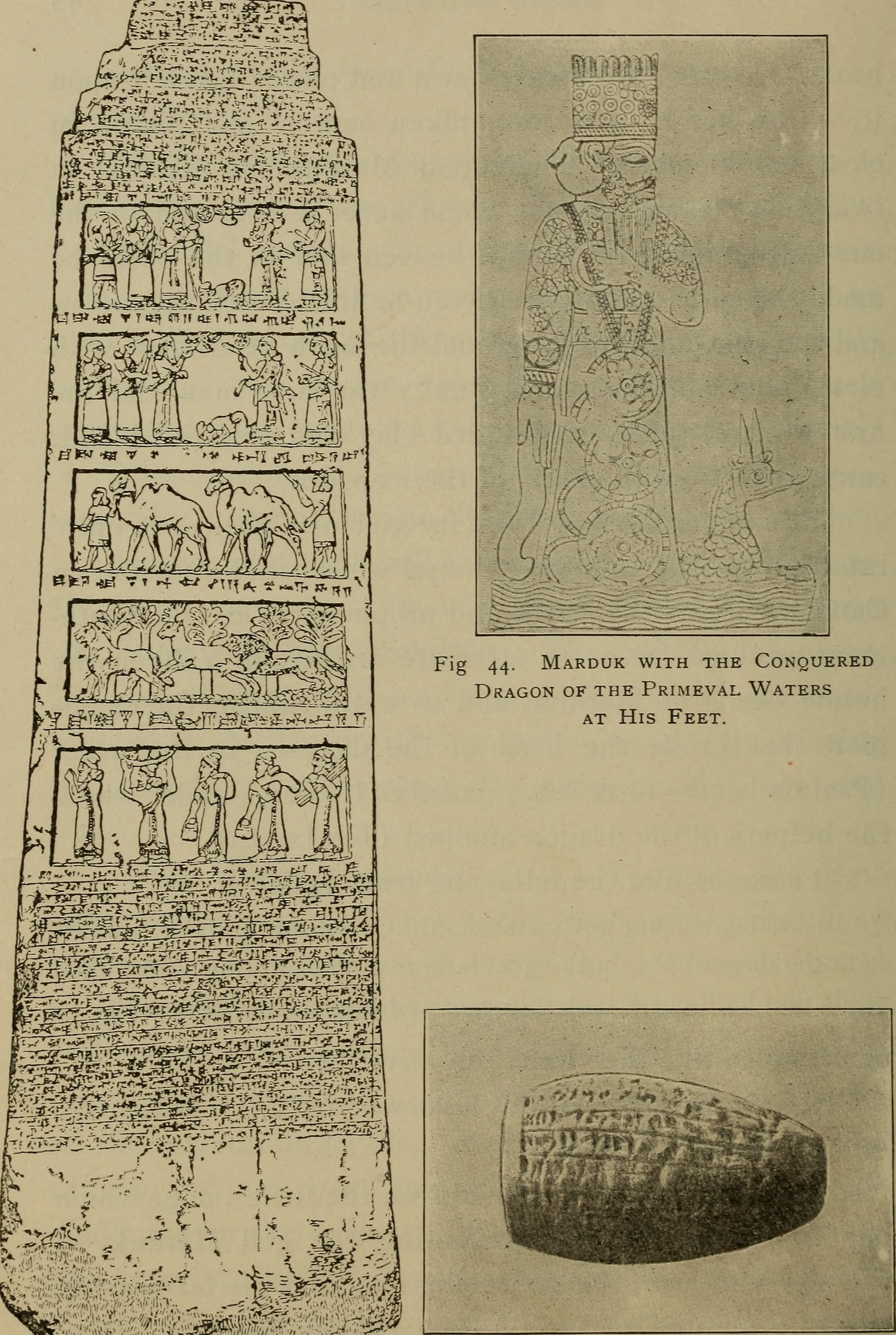
Babel and Bible (1906)

Friedrich Delitzsch specialized in the study of ancient Middle Eastern languages, and published numerous works on Assyrian language, history and culture. He is remembered today for his scholarly critique of the Old Testament. In a 1902 controversial lecture titled "Babel and Bible", Delitzsch maintained that many Old Testament writings were borrowed from ancient Babylonian tales, including the Genesis creation narrative and the Genesis flood narrative. During the following years there were several translations and modified versions of the "Babel and Bible". In the early 1920s, Delitzsch published the two-part Die große Täuschung (The Great Deception), which was a critical treatise on the book of Psalms, prophets of the Old Testament, the invasion of Canaan, etc. Delitzsch also stridently questioned the historical accuracy of the Hebrew Bible and placed great emphasis on its numerous examples of immorality (see also Julius Wellhausen).

== Influence and legacy ==
Although Delitzsch's proposal to replace the Old Testament with German myths did not extend to this revision, his student Paul Haupt was one of the major advocates of the thesis of the Aryan Jesus.

In 1904, he was elected as a member of the American Philosophical Society.

Among his students were H. V. Hilprecht, Heinrich Zimmern, Carl Bezold, and Fritz Hommel.

== Works ==
- Friedrich Delitzsch (1889). Archibald Robert Stirling Kennedy (ed.). Assyrian grammar with paradigms, exercises, glossary and bibliography. Vol. 10 of Porta linguarum orientalium. H. Reuther. p. 446.
- Friedrich Delitzsch (1896). Assyrisches Handwörterbuch (ATLA monograph preservation program). J.C. Hinrichs. p. 730. ISBN 9780837089799.
- Bruno Meissner, Friedrich Delitzsch (1898). Assyrisches Handwörterbuch. 1896 (ATLA monograph preservation program). E.J. Brill. p. 137. ISBN 9780837085975.
