= Evelyn Klengel-Brandt =

German archaeologist and museum director (1932–2026)

- Born: 13 December 1932
- Died: 8 April 2026 (aged 93)

Academic work
- Discipline: Archaeology
- Institutions: Vorderasiatisches Museum Berlin

Evelyn Klengel-Brandt (December 13, 1932 - April 8, 2026) was a German archaeologist and director of the Vorderasiatisches Museum Berlin from 1992 until 1997.

== Career ==
Klengel-Brandt initially joined the Vorderasiatisches Museum in 1951. In 1953, after the reopening of the museum, she began her studies at Humboldt University of Berlin, graduating in 1959. Subsequently, she rejoined the museum as a research assistant and was awarded her doctorate in 1964 for a thesis on terracottas from Assur. Klengel-Brandt became assistant director of the museum in 1978 and succeeded Liane Jakob-Rost as director in 1992. She held this position until her retirement in 1997.

== Personal life ==
Klengel-Brandt was married to the assyriologist Horst Klengel until his death in 2019.

== Select publications ==
- (1968). Apotropäische Tonfiguren aus Assur. Forschungen Und Berichte, 10, 19–37. https://doi.org/10.2307/3880541
- (1970) with Horst Klengel, Die Hethiter. Geschichte und Umwelt. Eine Kulturgeschichte Kleinasiens von Catal Hüyük bis zu Alexander dem Grossen. Koehler und Amelang, Leipzig.
- (1970) Reise in das alte Babylon. Prisma, Leipzig.
- (1978) Die Terrakotten aus Assur im Vorderasiatischen Museum Berlin. Deutscher Verlag der Wissenschaften, Berlin.
- (1988) Die Herrscher von Assur. Ein wiederentdecktes Reich im Alten Orient. Kinderbuchverlag, Berlin 1988, ISBN 3-358-00479-1 / Philipp von Zabern, Mainz 2005, ISBN 3-8053-3359-5
- (2002) with Horst Klengel, Spät-altbabylonische Tontafeln. Texte und Siegelabrollungen (= Vorderasiatische Schriftdenkmäler der Staatlichen Museen zu Berlin, Neue Folge, Heft 13 = Heft 29). Philipp von Zabern, Mainz. ISBN 978-3-8053-3103-6
- (2006) with Nadja Cholidis: Die Terrakotten von Babylon im Vorderasiatischen Museum in Berlin (= Wissenschaftliche Veröffentlichungen der Deutschen Orient-Gesellschaft, Band 115). 2 Bände [Text- und Tafelband], Saarländische Druck & Verlagsanstalt, Saarwellingen. ISBN 978-3-939166-02-3
- (2014) Die neuassyrische Glyptik aus Assur (= Wissenschaftliche Veröffentlichungen der Deutschen Orient-Gesellschaft, Band 140 = Ausgrabungen der Deutschen Orient-Gesellschaft in Assur. Reihe F: Fundgruppen, Band 7). Harrassowitz, Wiesbaden. ISBN 978-3-447-10196-7
- (2020) with Hans-Ulrich Onasch. Die Terrakotten aus Assur im Vorderasiatischen Museum Berlin. Von der frühdynastischen bis zur parthischen Zeit (= Wissenschaftliche Veröffentlichungen der Deutschen Orient-Gesellschaft, Band 156 = Ausgrabungen der Deutschen Orient-Gesellschaft in Assur. Reihe F: Fundgruppen, Band 10). Harrassowitz, Wiesbaden. ISBN 978-3-447-11394-6
