= Jules-Justin Sauveplane =

French priest and historian

Jules-Justin Sauveplane (1862–1928) was a French priest and historian.

== Biography ==
Jules-Justin Sauveplane studied at the École des langues orientales and the École pratique des Hautes Études. A specialist of Biblical studies and of the ancient East, he published one of the first French translations of the Epic of Gilgamesh (Une épopée babylonienne, 1893), in the Revue des Religions. He later supported his thesis on this topic (Sur l'épopée babylonienne de Gilgamès), under the direction of Joseph Halévy, in front of a jury including Gaston Maspero and Jules Oppert on 2 July 1894.

== Main works ==
- 1893: Une épopée babylonienne. Is-Tu-Bar - Gilgamès.
- 1894: Sur l'épopée babylonienne de Gilgamès.

== Sources ==
- Revue d'histoire de l'église de France, page 433, Société d'histoire ecclésiastique de la France, v.77, no.199, 1991
- Polybiblion : Revue bibliographique universelle, page 144, 1928
