= Liane Jakob-Rost =

German Assyriologist

Liane Jakob-Rost (born 1928 in Berlin) is a German Assyriologist.

Liane Jakob-Rost studied Ancient Near Eastern languages at the University of Berlin. From 1949 she worked at the Vorderasiatisches Museum Berlin in Berlin, as an academic employee after she received her doctorate in 1952. From 1958, she was curator of the collection and in this position she was responsible for the re-incorporation of the looted art returned by the Soviet Union at that time into the collection. In 1978 she succeeded Gerhard Rudolf Meyer as director of the museum. She retired from this position in 1990 and was succeeded by Evelyn Klengel-Brandt.

Jakob-Rost's research focus was the editing and publication of cuneiform sources in the museum's collection. She gave presentations in Germany and abroad, and also participated in several overseas exhibitions. She was involved in excavations in Bulgaria and Iraq.

== Publications ==
- Die Entzifferung der Keilschrift. Zum 200. Geburtstag von G. F. Grotefend (The Decipherment of Cuneiform: On the 200th Birthday of G.F. Grotefend), Staatliche Museen, Berlin 1975
- Das Lied von Ullikummi. Dichtungen der Hethiter (The Song of Ullikummi: Poetry of the Hittites), Insel-Verlag, Leipzig 1977
- with Joachim Marzahn: Babylon, Staatliche Museen, Berlin 1983
- with Joachim Marzahn: Assyrische Königsinschriften auf Ziegeln aus Assur (Assyrian Royal Inscriptions on Bricks from Assur), Akademie-Verlag, Berlin 1985
- Das Vorderasiatische Museum, von Zabern, Mainz 1992 ISBN 3-8053-1188-5
- with Iris Gerlach: Die Stempelsiegel im Vorderasiatischen Museum (The Stamp-seals in the Vorderasiatischen Museum), von Zabern, Mainz 1997 ISBN 3-8053-2029-9
