= Jean-Marie Durand =

French Assyriologist

Jean-Marie Durand (French pronunciation: [ʒɑ̃ maʁi dyʁɑ̃]; 13 November 1940) is a French Assyriologist.

== Career ==
A student of the École Normale Supérieure (Lettres 1962), agrégé of grammar (1965), Doctor of History following a thesis dedicated to the documents of the rooms 134 and 160 of the Royal Palace of Mari (1975), Jean-Marie Durand was "directeur d'études" at the École pratique des hautes études (IVth section, Sumerian and Akkadian Antiques) (1987–1997) and professor at the Collège de France, holder of the chair of Assyriology (1999–2011) where he succeeded Paul Garelli.

He largely devoted his research to the study of texts found in the ruins of the ancient city of Mari, and the publication of the Royal Archives of Mari.

Durand was elected a member of the Académie des inscriptions et belles-lettres 1 March 2013, at Emmanuel Poulle's seat.

As of 2016, Jean-Marie Durand is editor in chief of the Journal Asiatique.

== Selected works ==
- 1981: Textes babyloniens d'époque récente
- 1996: Amurru 1
- 1997: Les documents épistolaires du palais de Mari
- 1998: Les documents épistolaires du palais de Mari Tome II

== Bibliography ==
- (Article) « Les premiers médecins en Mésopotamie : l’exemple de Mari ». In Comptes rendus de l'Académie des inscriptions et belles-lettres, n°4, 2006. pp. 1827–1834 Online
- (Article) « Zimrî-Lîm achète la ville d’Alahtum ». In : Comptes rendus des séances de l’Académie des Inscriptions et Belles-Lettres, n°1, 2002. pp. 11–30. Online
