= Luboš Hilgert =

Luboš Hilgert may refer to:

- Luboš Hilgert (canoeist, born 1960), husband of Štěpánka Hilgertová
- Luboš Hilgert (canoeist, born 1986), son of Štěpánka Hilgertová
