= Khazal al-Majidi =

Iraqi author

- خزعل الماجدي
- Born: 1951 (age 74–75); Kirkuk, Iraq
- Citizenship: Iraq, Netherlands
- Education: Institute of Arab History and Scientific Heritage (PhD)
- Occupation: Author
- Writing career
- Language: Arabic
- Years active: 1995-
- Genres: mythology, ancient civilizations, ancient religion

Khazal al-Majidi (Arabic: خزعل الماجدي; born 1951) is an Iraqi author who has written on the history of religions and civilizations. He is also a poet and playwright.

He is the author of more than 50 works in Arabic, whose themes vary between religious studies and civilizations, poetry, and plays. Much of his work has been translated into English, French, Spanish, Persian and Kurdish

== Early life and education ==
Al-Majidi was born in Kirkuk, Iraq, in 1951. He completed his studies in Baghdad and obtained a doctorate in ancient history from the Institute of Arab History and Scientific Heritage for Graduate Studies in 1996.

== Career ==
Al-Majidi worked in the Department of Cinema and Theater in the Iraqi Ministry of Culture until 1998. He worked between 1973-and 1996 in radio, television, magazines, Iraqi newspapers, the Union of Writers and Writers, and the Department of Cinema and Theater. Then, Khazal worked as a professor at the University of Derna in Libya from 1998 to 2003, teaching ancient and art history. Moreover, he worked in Jordan and published his first intellectual books between 1996 and 1998.

In August 2003, Khazal returned to Iraq and served as Director of the Iraqi Center for Dialogue of Civilizations and Religions. Furthermore, between 2007 and 2014, he lectured at Leiden University and worked in several open universities in the Netherlands and Europe, and he taught the history of ancient civilizations and religions. He is also a member of the Union of Iraqi Writers, the Arab Writers Union the Union of Iraqi Playwrights, the Federation of Journalists of Iraq, the Union of Arab Historians, and a member of the International Academy of East-West in Romania. He is a theatrical author and the author of more than fifty books on mythology (The Eternal Return: A Return to Origins and the Conflict of Myth and History) published by the Arab House of Encyclopaedias in 2011. Ancient history, ancient religions, poetry, theater, history of religions, science, and history of civilizations.

== Publications ==
=== Mythology, ancient religions, and civilizations ===
| Year | Title | Translated title | Publisher | Ref |
|---|---|---|---|---|
| 1995 | Hikāyāt Somarīya | Sumerian Tales | Ministry of Information, Baghdad | |
| 1997 | Mitholojia Al-Urdun Al-Qadīm | Ancient Jordan's Mythology | Ministry of Tourism and Antiquities, Amman | |
| 1997 | Adyān wa Mu'taqadāt ma Qabla Al-Tārīkh | Prehistoric Religions and Beliefs | Al-Shorouk Publication | |
| 1997 | Judhoor Al-Diyāna Al-Mandā'īya | The Roots of the Mandaean Religion | Al-Mansour Library | |
| 1998 | Al-Dīn Al-Somarī | Sumerian Religion | Al-Shorouk Publication | |
| 1998 | Bakhoor Al-Āliha: Dirāsa fi Al-Ṭib wa Al-Siḥr wa Al-Usṭoora wa Al-Dīn | The Incense of the Gods: A Study in Medicine, Magic, Myth, and Religion | Al-Dar Al-Ahlia | |
| 1998 | Mitoon Somar: Al-Tārīkh, Al-Mitholojia, Al-Lāhoot, Al-Ṭoqoos | Sumerian Texts: History, Mythology, Theology, Rituals | Al-Dar Al-Ahlia | |
| 1998 | Injeel Somar | The Gospel of Sumer | Al-Ahlia House | |
| 1998 | Injeel Bābil | The Gospel of Babylon | Al-Ahlia House | |
| 1999 | Al-Āliha Al-Kan'āniya | The Canaanite Gods | Azma House, Crisis House | |
| 1999 | Al-Deen Al-Miṣry | Egyptian Religion | Al-Shorouk Publication | |
| 1999 | Sifru Somar | The Book of Sumer | Ishtar Publication | |
| 2000 | Al-Mu'taqadāt Al-Āramiya | Aramaic Beliefs | Al-Shorouk Publication | |
| 2001 | Al-Mu'taqadāt Al-Kan'āniya | Canaanite Beliefs | Al-Shorouk Publication | |
| 2001 | Mawsoo'at Al-Falak fi Al-Tārīkh Al-Qadīm | Encyclopedia of Astronomy in Ancient History | Osama Publication | |
| 2001 | Mitholojya Al-Kholood: Dirāsa fi Asaṭeer Al-Kholood Qabil wa Ba'id Al-Mawt fi Al-Ḥaḍārāt Al-Qadīma | The Mythology of Immortality: A Study in the Myths of Immortality Before and After Death in Ancient Civilizations | Al-Madar Al-Ahlia Publication | |
| 2002 | Al-Mu'taqadāt Al-Āmoorīya | Amorite Beliefs | Al-Shorouk Publication | |
| 2002 | Adab Al-Kālā...Adab Al-Nār/ Dirāsa fi Al-Adab wa Al-Fan wa Al-Jins fi Al-'Ālam Al-Qadīm | The Literature of Kala: Literature of Fire/A Study in Literature, Art and Sex in the Ancient World | Arab Foundation for Studies and Publishing | |
| 2004 | Al-Mu'taqadāt Al-'Ighrīqīya | Greek Beliefs | Al-Shorouk Publication | |
| 2005 | Al-Mu'taqadāt Al-Roomanīya | Roman Beliefs | Al-Shorouk Publication | |
| 2005 | Tārīkh Al-Quds Al-Qadīm: Mundhu 'Uṣoor ma Qabla Al-Tarīkh Ḥatta Al-Eḥtilāl Al-Roomanī | The History of Ancient Jerusalem: From Prehistoric Times until the Roman Occupation | Arab Institute for Studies and Publishing | |
| 2008 | Kunooz Libya Al-Qadīma | The Treasures of Ancient Libya | Zahran House | |
| 2010 | Siḥr Al-Bidāyāt | The Magic of Beginnings | Al-Naya Publication | |
| 2010 | Al-Mitholojia Al-Mandā'īya | Mandaean Mythology | Nineveh House | |
| 2011 | Al-'Awd Al-Abadi: Al-'Awda Lil-Uṣool wa Ṣirā' Al-Usṭoora wa Al-Tarīkh | The Eternal Return: A Return to Origins and the Struggle of Myth and History | Arab House of Encyclopedias | |
| 2012 | Al-Anbāṭ: Al-Tārīkh wa Al-Mitholojia wa Al-Funoon | The Nabataeans: History, Mythology and the Arts | Al-Naya Publication | |
| 2013 | Kitāb Enki: Al-Adab fi Wādi Al-Rāfidayn | Enki's Book: Literature in Mesopotamia | Arab Cultural Center and Believers Without Borders Foundation | |
| 2014 | Tārīkh Al-Khalīqa | The History of Creation | Noun House | |
| 2014 | Ḥaḍārāt ma Qabla Al-Tārīkh | Prehistoric Civilizations | Noun House | |
| 2014 | Ālihat Al-Shām | The Gods of the Levant | Noon House | |
| 2014 | Al-Mindālā Al-Mitholojīya | The Mythological Mandalas | Noon House | |
| 2014 | Kashf Al-Ḥalaqa Al-Mafqooda Baina Adyān Al-Ta'adud wa Al-Tawḥīd | Uncovering the Missing Link between the Religions of Polytheism and Monotheism | Believers Without Borders Foundation | |
| 2014 | Uṣool Al-Nāṣoorāīya Al-Mandā'īya fi Erīdu wa Somar | The Origins of Mandaean Nassaurianism in Eridu and Sumer | Fadaat House | |
| 2015 | Al-Ḥaḍāra Al-Somarīya | Sumerian Civilization | Noun House | |
| 2015 | Al-Ḥaḍāra Al-Miṣrīya | Egyptian Civilization | Noun House | |
| 2016 | Al-Āmooriyoon Al-Sāmīyoon Al-Awā'il: Al-Tārīkh, Al-Mitholojia, Al-Ṭokoos, Al-Funoon | The Early Semitic Amorites: History, Mythology, Rituals, Arts | Pages | |
| 2016 | 'Ilm Al-Adyān: Tārīkhuhu, Mukawinātuhu, Manāhijuhu, A'alāmuhu, Hādiruhu, wa Mustaqbaluhu | The Science of Religions: Its History, Components, Methods, Features, Present, and Future | Believers Without Borders | |
| 2017 | Al-Siḥr wa Al-Dīn fi 'Uṣoor ma Qabla Al-Tārīkh | Magic and Religion in Prehistoric Times | Nineveh House, Al-Rafidain Publication | |
| 2017 | Iraq ma Qabla Al-Tārīkh | Prehistoric Iraq | Vision | |
| 2018 | Anbiyā' Somarīyoon: Kaifa Taḥawala 'Asharatu Moolookin Somariyīn ela 'Asharati Anbiyā' Tawrātiyīn? | Sumerian Prophets: How Did Ten Sumerian Kings Turn into Ten Biblical Prophets? | Cultural Book Center | |
| 2019 | Al-Ḥaḍārāt Al-Sāmmiya Al-Mubakkira | Early Semitic Civilizations | Takween Publications | |
| 2019 | Al-Ḥaḍāra Al-Hindīya | Indian Civilization | Takween Publications | |

=== Poetry ===
| Year | Title | Translated title | Publisher | Ref |
|---|---|---|---|---|
| 1980 | Yaqaẓat Dilmun | Dilmun's Awakening | Ministry of Information | |
| 1984 | Anāsheed Isrāphīl | The Hymns of Israfil | Ministry of Information | |
| 1989 | Khazāīl | | Ministry of Information | |
| 1993 | 'Ukkāzat Rāmbo | Rambo's Crutch | Al-Amad Publication | |
| 1997 | Fīzyā' Mudhāda | Anti-Physics | Al Mansour Library | |
| 2006 | Ḥayya wa Daraj | A Snake and a Ladder | Al Mansour Library | |
| 2009 | Film Ṭaweel Jidan | A Very Long Film | Babel Publications | |
| 2010 | Aḥzān Al-Sina Al-'Irāqīya | The Sorrows of the Iraqi Year | Dar Al-Ghawon Publication | |
| 2013 | Rubbamā...Man Yadri? | Perhaps...Who Knows?! | Mesopotamia | |
| 2013 | Shoghāt | | Mesopotamia | |
| 2017 | Ward Li-Wajhiki kai Yabooḥ | Flowers for Your Face So That It Can Be Revealed | Fadaat Publication | |
| 2017 | Taqaluba Al-Jamri wa Tatahayyaj | The Embers are Stirred and Irritated | Fadaat House | |
| | Al-A'amāl Al-Shi'rīyya (6 volumes) | Poetic Works | Arab Foundation for Studies and Publishing | |

=== Plays ===
| Year | Title | Translated title | Ref |
|---|---|---|---|
| 1990 | 'Ouzla fi Al-Kirīstāl | Isolation in the Crystal | |
| 1991 | Ḥaflat Almās | Diamond Party | |
| 1992 | Hāmlit bilā Hāmlit | Hamlet without Hamlet | |
| 1992 | Qamar min Dam | Moon of Blood | |
| 1992 | Al-Ghurāb | The Raven | |
| 1993 | Masraḥīyyāt Qaṣīra Jiddan | Very Short Plays | |
| 1993 | Tamooz fi Al-A'aālī | July in the High | |
| 1994 | Qiyāmit Shahrazād | The Resurrection of Scheherazade | |
| 1994 | Nuzool 'Ishtār ela Malja' Al-Āmirrīya | Ishtar's Descent into the Amiriyah Shelter | |
| 1995 | Akīto: Al-Layāli Al-Bābilīya | Akito: Babylonian Nights | |
| 1997 | Miftāḥ Baghdād | The Key of Baghdad | |
| 1997 | Anīmā | | |
| 1999 | Sidrā | | |
| 2008 | Musīqā Ṣafrā' | Yellow Music | |
| 2008 | Al-Tīh | The Labyrinth | |
| 2017 | Al-Masraḥ Al-Maftooḥ | The Open Theater | |

=== Poetic theories ===
- (The Poetic Reason) Book One (The Pure Poetic Reason and the Speaking Ocean) Issued by the House of Cultural Affairs, Baghdad 2004.
- (The Poetic Reason) The second book (The Practical, Outward and Inward Poetic Reason) was published by the House of Cultural Affairs, Baghdad 2004.

== See also ==
- Donny George Youkhanna
- Taha Baqir
- Hormuz Rassam
