= Heinrich Zimmern =

German Assyriologist (1862–1931)

To be distinguished from Heinrich Zimmer (1890–1943) German Indologist, and Heinrich Zimmer (Celticist) (1851–1910)

Heinrich Zimmern (14 July 1862, in Graben – 17 February 1931, in Leipzig) was a German Assyriologist. He was the first professor of Assyriology at Leipzig University, and considered the founder of the discipline of the history of the ancient Near Eastern religions in Germany.

== Academic career ==
From 1881 to 1885 he studied theology and Semitic languages at the universities of Leipzig and Berlin, receiving his habilitation for Semitic languages in 1889 at the University of Königsberg. In 1894 he became an associate professor of Assyriology to the faculty of philosophy at Leipzig, where from 1900 to 1929 he served as a full professor.

== Published works ==
- Beiträge zur Kenntnis der babylonischen Religion. Hinrichs, Leipzig 1896–1901 – Contributions to the understanding of Babylonian religion.
- Vergleichende Grammatik der semitischen Sprachen. Reuther und Reichard, Berlin 1898 – Comparative grammar of Semitic languages.
- Biblische und babylonische Urgeschichte, translated into English and published as The Babylonian and the Hebrew Genesis (1901).
- Babylonische Hymnen und Gebete. Hinrichs, Leipzig 1905 – Babylonian hymns and prayers.
- Sumerische Kultlieder aus altbabylonischer Zeit. Hinrichs, Leipzig 1912 – Sumerian cult songs from the Old Babylonian period.
- Akkadische Fremdwörter als Beweis für babylonischen Kultureinfluß. Hinrichs, Leipzig 1915 – Akkadian foreign words as evidence of Babylonian cultural influence.
