= Joseph Étienne Gautier =

Joseph Étienne Gautier (6 September 1861, Oullins – 10 February 1924, Paris) was a French archaeologist.

He received his education in his hometown of Oullins and at the École pratique des hautes études (EPHE) in Paris. From 1884 to 1888, he took part in archaeological research throughout the Middle East (Syria, Mesopotamia, Persia), and in 1893 conducted exploratory work at Tell et-Tin, near the city of Homs. From 1894 to 1896, with Gustave Jéquier, he performed archaeological excavations in Egypt, and in the meantime, studied Assyriology in Paris as a student of Jean-Vincent Scheil.

From 1897, at Susa, he was part of an archaeological team under the leadership of Jacques de Morgan. In the neighboring region of Moussian, with Georges Lampre (1855-1912), he uncovered several overlapping stages of cultures that predated the time of Sargon of Akkad. From 1904 to 1907 he served as director of archaeological excavations at Susa. Afterwards, he returned to Egypt, where he conducted archaeological digs at Elephantine.

== Published works ==
With others, he made contributions to the series' "Textes élamites-anzanites" (Elamite-Anzanite texts, 1901-) and "Textes élamites-sémitiques" (Elamite-Semitic texts, 1900-1913), as well as to the multi-volume "Mémoires de la Mission Archéologique de Perse". His other noted written efforts include:

- Mémoire sur les fouilles de Licht, 1902 (with Gustave Jéquier) – Memoirs on the excavations at Licht.
- Fouilles de Moussian, 1905 (with Georges Lampre) – Excavation at Moussian.
- Archives d'une famille de Dilbat au temps de la première dynastie de Babylone, 1908 – Archives of a family at Dilbat during the First Dynasty of Babylon.
- Annales de Tukulti Ninip II, roi d'Assyrie 889-884, 1909 (with Jean-Vincent Scheil) – Annals of Tukulti Ninip II, king of Assyria 889-884.
