= Dominique Charpin =

French Assyriologist

- Born: 12 June 1954 (age 72); Neuilly-sur-Seine, France

Academic background
- Thesis: Le Clergé d'Ur au siècle d'Hammu-rabi
- Doctoral advisor: Paul Garelli

Academic work
- Discipline: Assyriology
- Institutions: Collège de France
- Main interests: amorrite

Dominique Charpin (born 12 June 1954) is a French Assyriologist, professor at the Collège de France, and corresponding member of the Académie des Inscriptions et Belles-Lettres, specialized in the "Old-Babylonian" period.

== Biography ==
Born on 12 June 1954 in Neuilly-sur-Seine, near Paris, Charpin was in high school when a trip to Turkey and a stay in Syria and Lebanon in the following year determined his vocation. After graduating with a bachelor's degree in 1971, he pursued his studies in history, and more specifically chose to study epigraphy rather than archaeology, but learned these two subjects, and began to practice them during excavations in Iraq. He passed the agrégation of history in 1976, a doctoral dissertation in 1979 on the subject of Archives familiales et propriété privée en Babylonie ancienne, and his doctorate thesis on Le Clergé d'Ur au siècle d'Hammu-rabi in 1984, under the direction of Paul Garelli.

He participates in excavations and studies at the Larsa site in Iraq, and the Mari sites tell Mohammed Diyab in Syria.

As an assistant at the Pantheon-Sorbonne University from 1976, Charpin integrates the Centre national de la recherche scientifique (CNRS) in 1985 as research fellow, then returned to Paris 1 in 1988 as a teacher. At the same time, he was also the director of studies cumulating to the École pratique des hautes études (EPHE) in "History and civilization of ancient Babylonia" from 1994 to 2005. Charpin later became the director of studies for 8 years from 2005 until 2013.

Mesopotamia constitutes his main focus particularly towards the old Babylonian period or "amorrite"; it is the great era of Mesopotamian civilization, with Hammurabi on which he signed the first book in French in 2003.

A correspondent of the Académie des inscriptions et beaux-lettres since 30 March 2012, Dominique Charpin was appointed professor at the Collège de France, holder of the chair "Mesopotamian civilization" from 1 January 2014.

He is also director of the "Revue d'assyriologie", president of the Society for the Study of the Ancient Near East, co-director of the "Archives Royales de Mari" collection, deputy director of the UMR 7192 "Near East - Caucasus: languages, archaeology, cultures" (Centre national de la recherche scientifique, Collège de France, École pratique des hautes études, INALCO).

== Acknowledgement ==
- Corresponding member of the Académie des inscriptions et belles-lettres
- Honorary member of the American Oriental Society

== Honours and awards ==
=== Honours ===
- Knight (chevalier) of the Ordre des Palmes académiques (France)

=== Awards ===
- 1987 : Prix Saintour of the Académie des inscriptions et belles-lettres
- 2004 : Prix du Budget of the Institut de France

=== Honorary degrees ===
- 2021 : University of Chicago

== Main publications ==
Dominique Charpin's main publications, not counting the various articles and various contributions, are as follows:

- Archives familiales et propriété privée en Babylonie ancienne : étude des documents de « Tell Sifr », Hautes Études Orientales 12, Genève et Paris, Droz, 1980, 357 p.
- Documents cunéiformes de Strasbourg conservés à la Bibliothèque Nationale et Universitaire, in coll. with J.-M. Durand, tome I, Cahiers 4, Paris, Éditions Recherche sur les Civilisations, 1981.
- Le Clergé d’Ur au siècle d’Hammurabi XIXe – XVIIIe siècles av. J.C.), Hautes Études Orientales 22, Genève et Paris, Droz, 1986, 520 p. — Prix Saintour de l'Académie des inscriptions et belles-lettres 1987.
- Archives Épistolaires de Mari I/2, Archives Royales de Mari 26/2, Paris, Éditions Recherche sur les Civilisations, 1988, 232 p.
- (dir.) Marchands, diplomates et empereurs. Études sur la civilisation mésopotamienne offertes à Paul Garelli, in coll. with F. Joannès, Paris 1991.
- (dir.) La circulation des biens, des personnes et des idées dans le Proche-Orient ancien, Actes de la XXXVIIIe Rencontre assyriologique internationale, in coll. with F. Joannès, Paris, 1992.
- (dir.) Florilegium Marianum II. Recueil d’études à la mémoire de Maurice Birot, in coll. with J.-M. Durand, Mémoires de NABU 3, Paris, 1994.
- (dir.) Florilegium Marianum III. Recueil d’études à la mémoire de Marie-Thérèse Barrelet, in coll. with J.-M. Durand, Mémoires de NABU 4, Paris, 1997.
- (dir.) Mari, Ébla et les Hourrites: dix ans de travaux. Actes du colloque international (Paris, May 1993). Second part, Amurru 2, Paris, 2001.
- (dir.) Florilegium Marianum VI. Recueil d’études à la mémoire d’André Parrot, Mémoire de Nabu 7, Paris, 2002.
- Florilegium Marianum V, Mari et le Proche-Orient à l’époque amorrite, essai d'histoire politique, in coll. with N. Ziegler, Mémoires de NABU 6, Paris, SEPOA, 2003, 303 p. — Prix du Budget of the Académie des Inscriptions et Belles-Lettres 2004.
- Hammu-rabi de Babylone, Paris, PUF, 2003, 312 p. Translated into Italian, 2005; in English, 2012; in German and in Russian.
- Histoire politique de la Mésopotamie (2002–1595), in D. Charpin, D. O. Edzard and M. Stol, Mesopotamien : Die altbabylonische Zeit, Annäherungen 4, Orbis Biblicus et Orientalis 160/4, Fribourg, Academic Press et Göttingen, Vandenhoeck & Ruprecht, 2004, 457 p.
- Reading and Writing in Babylon, Paris, PUF, 2008, 317 p.; Translated into Russian, 2009; English, 2011.
- Writing, Law, and Kingship : Essays on Old Babylonian Mesopotamia, Chicago, Chicago University Press, 2010, 181 p.
- Gods, Kings, and Merchants in Old Babylonian Mesopotamia, PIPOAC 2, Louvain et Paris, Peeters, 2014, 206 p.
- How to be an Assyriologist ?, Paris, Fayard / Collège de France, 2017.
- La vie méconnue des temples mésopotamiens, Docet omnia, 1, Les Belles Lettres / Collège de France, Paris, 2017.
- “Tu es de mon sang !” Les alliances dans le Proche-Orient ancien, Docet omnia 4, Les Belles Lettres / Collège de France, Paris, 2019.
- Nouvelles recherches sur les archives d'Ur d'époque paléo-babylonienne (with M. Béranger, B. Fiette, A. Jacquet & al.), Paris, Mémoires de NABU 22, 2020.
