= Carl Bezold =

German orientalist (1859–1922)

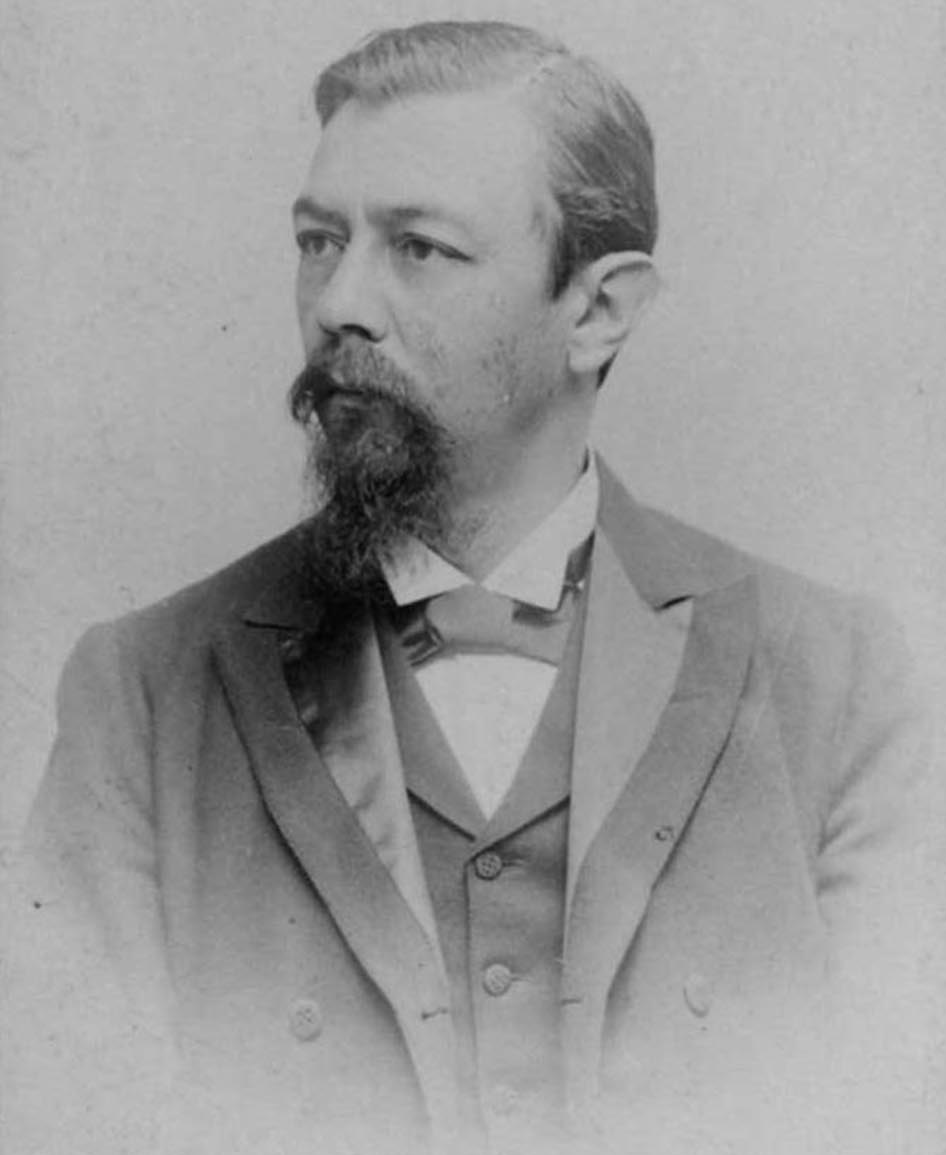
Carl Bezold

Carl Bezold (18 May 1859 – 21 November 1922) was a German orientalist. Known primarily for his research in Akkadian (Babylonian-Assyrian), he also researched other Semitic languages: Syriac, Ge'ez (Ethiopic) and Arabic.

== Biography ==
Carl Bezold was born in Donauwörth on 18 May 1859. He was educated at the Ludwig-Maximilians-Universität München and Leipzig University, where he studied with Assyrologist Friedrich Delitzsch. In 1883, he obtained his habilitation at the Ludwig-Maximilians-Universität München with a thesis titled Die Schatzhöhle; aus dem syrischen texte dreier unedirten Handschriften ("The Treasure Trove", second part issued in 1888). Later on, he spent several years working at the British Museum in London. In 1894, he became a full professor at Heidelberg University.

== Contributions ==
At the British Museum, he arranged and cataloged the large collection of cuneiform texts from the Library of Ashurbanipal at Nineveh, publishing "Catalogue of Cuneiform Tablets in the Kouyundjik Collection of the British Museum", (1889) as a result. In London, he also recorded the clay tablets of El-Amarna (Egypt), of which he published "The Tell el-Amarna Tablets in the British Museum", (1892).

In 1884, along with Fritz Hommel, he founded the journal Zeitschrift für Keilschriftforschung und verwandte Gebiete, which in 1886 was superseded by the Zeitschrift für Assyriologie und verwandte Gebiete. Bezold was sole publisher of the journal in the period from 1886 to 1922, during which 34 volumes were published.

In 1909, he edited and printed the Ethiopic epic Kebra Nagast, collating the most valuable texts and with critical notes.

In June 1901, he was awarded the honorary degree of Doctor of Laws (DLL) at the University of Glasgow.

He died in Heidelberg on 21 November 1922.

In 1926, his Babylonian-Assyrian glossary ("Babylonisch-assyrisches Glossar") was published posthumously by his widow, Adele Bezold, and Hittitologist Albrecht Goetze.
