= Paul Garelli =

French Assyriologist

- Born: 23 April 1924; Croydon
- Died: 8 July 2006 (aged 82); Nice
- Occupation: Assyriologist

Paul Garelli (23 April 1924 – 8 July 2006) was a French Assyriologist, director of research at the CNRS, professor at the Sorbonne and the l'EPHE, a member of the Académie des inscriptions et belles-lettres and professor at the Collège de France.

== Early life ==
Paul Garelli was born in Croydon, London. He spent his early years in Switzerland and Istanbul, where his father was director general of the Ottoman Bank.

== Education ==
He did his graduate studies in Geneva and Paris. He obtained a BA in economics and in 1951 the degree of the École pratique des hautes études (historical and philological studies section).

== Career ==
He would return to the EPHE in 1974 as director of studies at the IVth section.

In 1958, Paul Garelli joined the Centre national de la recherche scientifique where he became a research fellow in 1967 at the head of the Archaeology and history section of the Assyrian-Babylonian countries. He was part of the National Committee of the CNRS.

A Doctor of Letters (History) in 1963, he was a lecturer and professor at the Sorbonne from 1967 to 1986. He taught history of the peoples of the Semitic East.

Paul Garelli was a member of the Société Asiatique (1972) and of the international committee of Ebla (Rome) (1977) and president of the François Thureau-Dangin group (1975).

In 1982, he was elected ordinary member of the Académie des Inscriptions et Belles-Lettres then, in 1986, professor of Assyriologie at the Collège de France.

== Publications ==
- 1963: Les Assyriens en Cappadoce, Maisonneuve,
- 1974: Les Empires Mésopotamie-Israël (en coll.), reprint 1997
- 1990: L'Assyriologie, PUF, coll. "Que sais-je?",
- 1997–2002 : Le Proche-Orient asiatique, PUF : volume 1, 1997, with Jean-Marie Durand and Hatice Gonnet; volume 2, 2002, with André Lemaire

== Bibliography ==
- Dominique Charpin and F. Joannès (dir.), Marchands, diplomates et empereurs, Études sur la civilisation mésopotamienne offertes à Paul Garelli, Paris, 1991
