= Behnam Abu Alsoof =

Iraqi archaeologist, anthropologist, historian and writer

Doctor Behnam Abu Alsoof بهنام أبو الصوف
- Born: 1931; Mosul, Iraq
- Died: September 19, 2012 (aged 80–81); Amman, Jordan
- Occupations: archaeologist, anthropologist, historian, academic, writer, blogger
- Years active: 1965–2012

Behnam Nasser Nuaman Abu Alsoof (Arabic: بهنام ناصر نعمان أبو الصوف Behnam Abu alsouf) (born 1931 in Mosul, Iraq, died September 19, 2012) was an Iraqi Assyriologist, anthropologist, historian and writer.

He was born in Mosul to a Christian Syriac family. He completed his elementary and junior high in the city of Mosul. He earned a BA in Archaeology and Civilization from the University of Baghdad in 1955. He completed graduate studies at the University of Cambridge, England and received his doctorate degree in Archaeology and the nucleus of civilization and anthropology in the autumn of 1966. He worked on scientific rescue excavations on a wide basin in the Hamrin Dam (in Diyala Governorate), and Mosul Dam on the Tigris River in the late 1970s to mid-1980s. He revealed several archaeological sites in Iraq, including Tell es-Sawwan in Samarra in Saladin Governorate, which was from the Stone Age. He also led his work at the site of Qainj Agha near Erbil Castle to detect a wide range of archaeological evidence from the Uruk period. He lectured for many years at the roots of material civilization, archeology, and history in a number of Iraq's universities and the Institute of Arab history for Graduate Studies.

He wrote several books, including Pottery of Uruk Period: Origins and Spread (English language), The Shadow of the Ancient Valley (Arabic language), and Iraq: The Unity of the Earth, Civilization and Human (Arabic language).

He died on September 19, 2012, in Amman, Jordan at the age of eighty due to a heart attack.

Behnam Abu Alsoof opposed the idea of Assyrian identity and that Syriac Christians are not descendants of ancient Assyrians, instead promoting the idea they are Aramaic Nestorians.

== See also ==
- Taha Baqir
- Donny George Youkhanna
