= Markus Hilgert =

Markus Hilgert (born 11 August 1969) is a German Assyriologist and cultural manager. Currently, he is the president of the Berlin University of the Arts. From 2018 until 2025, Hilgert served as Secretary General and CEO of the Cultural Foundation of the German Federal States, and from 2014 until 2018, as the director of the Vorderasiatisches Museum at the Pergamonmuseum in Berlin. From 2007 until 2014, Hilgert was a tenured professor of Assyriology at Heidelberg University.

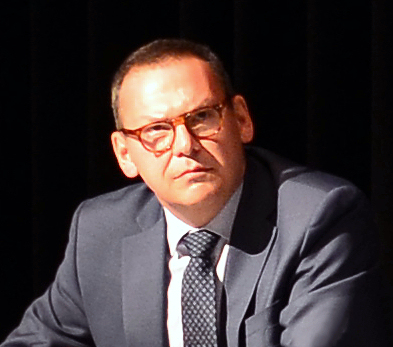
Markus Hilgert.

Hilgert is a member of several governing bodies and advisory boards, including the German Commission for UNESCO (since 2016)., the Foundation Board of the International Alliance for the Protection of Heritage in Conflict Areas (ALIPH; since 2017), and the Advisory Board of the Arcadia Fund (since 2020).

Hilgert holds honorary professorships at Heidelberg University, Marburg University, and Free University Berlin. In 2016, Hilgert was named National Correspondent for the German National Committee of the Blue Shield, part of the Blue Shield network, protecting heritage in armed conflict. From 2017 until 2018 he served as founding president of the German National Committee of the Blue Shield. In 2021, Hilgert established the Cultural Emergency Alliance (Notfallallianz Kultur) in Germany.

== Selected Writings (in English) ==
- Cuneiform Texts from the Ur III Period in the Oriental Institute, Volume 1: Drehem Administrative Documents from the Reign of Šulgi. Oriental Institute Publications 115. Oriental Institute, Chicago 1998. ISBN 978-1-885923-07-3.
- Cuneiform Texts from the Ur III Period in the Oriental Institute, Volume 2: Drehem Administrative Documents from the Reign of Amar-Suena. Oriental Institute Publications 121. Oriental Institute, Chicago 2003. ISBN 978-1-885923-24-0.
- Why Culture Matters: Fostering Identity Through Cultural Heritage. The Globalist vom 5. November 2017.
- Digitalization and Democratization - the Reinvention of Culture. Strategic Intervention Paper. Berlin: Global Ideas Center, 2022.
- Cultural Resilience for Democratic Stability – Towards a Resilient Cultural Policy in Germany. Compendium of Cultural Policies and Trends (ed.), Bonn, 18.08.2026, DOI: https://doi.org/10.69813/FAHN7083.
