= Paul Haupt =

Hermann Hugo Paul Haupt (25 November 1858 in Görlitz – 15 December 1926 in Baltimore, Maryland) was a Semitic scholar, one of the pioneers of Assyriology in the United States.

He studied at the universities of Berlin and Leipzig. In 1880 he became Privatdozent in the University of Göttingen and from 1883 to 1889 was assistant professor of Assyriology. In 1883 he became professor of Semitic languages at Johns Hopkins University, but until 1889 continued to lecture in the summer at Göttingen.

He introduced the principle of the neogrammarians into Semitic philology, and discovered the Sumerian language in 1880.

In addition to numerous smaller articles, he projected and edited the Polychrome Bible, a critical edition of the Hebrew text of the Old Testament, and a new English translation with notes. A unique feature of this edition is the use of different colors to distinguish the various sources and component parts in the Old Testament books—each one of which is entrusted to a specialist in biblical studies.

He was an associate editor of Hebräer. In 1881, he became co-editor with Friedrich Delitzsch of the Beiträge zur Assyriologie und semitischen Sprachwissenschaft published in Leipzig.

Haupt received the honorary Doctor of Laws (LL.D) from the University of Glasgow in June 1901. He was elected as a member to the American Philosophical Society in 1902.

== Publications ==
- Der keilinschriftliche Sintfluthbericht (1881)
- Akkadische und sumerische Keilschrifttexte (1881–82)
- Die akkadische Sprache (1882)
- Sumerische Familiengesetze (1883)
- Nimrodepos (the Gilgamesh epic, 1884–1891)

He published critical texts with notes of:

- Canticles (1902)
- Koheleth (1905)
- Ecclesiastes (1905)
- Nahum (1907); Esther (1908)
- Micah (1910)
- Biblische Liebeslieder (1907)
- "Die Schlacht von Taanach", in Studien ... Wellhausen gewidmet (1914)
