= Taha Baqir =

Iraqi Assyriologist, cuneiformist, writer, and historian (1912–1984)

Doctor Taha Baqir طه باقر
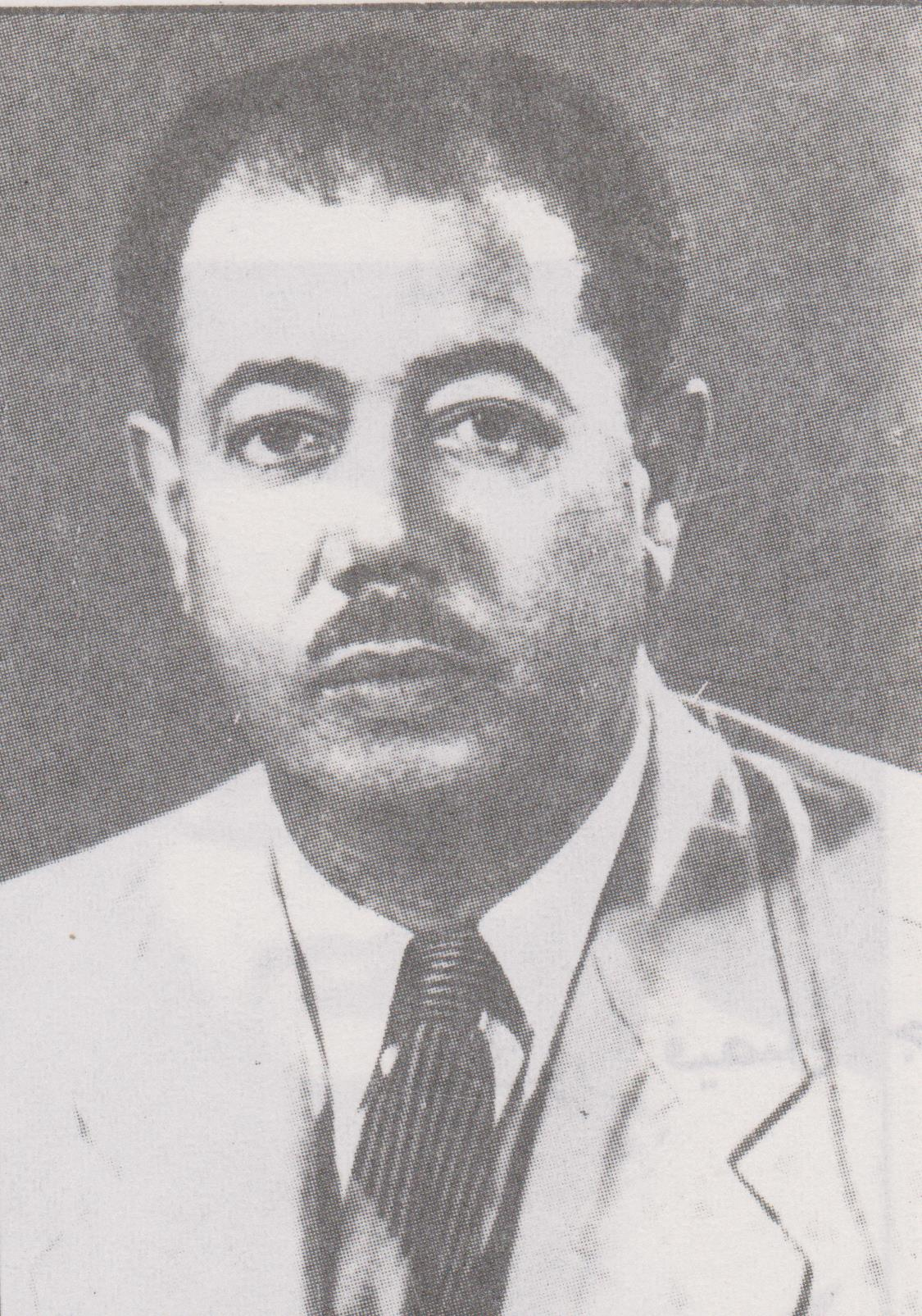
- Born: 1912; Babylon, Ottoman Iraq
- Died: 28 February 1984 (aged 71–72); Baghdad, Iraq
- Resting place: Najaf, Iraq
- Education: American University of Beirut; University of Chicago
- Occupations: Assyriologist, archaeologist, author, historian, linguist, academic
- Years active: 1938–1983
- Organization(s): Iraqi Directorate of Antiquities, Iraqi National Museum, University of Baghdad, Iraqi Academy of Sciences
- Known for: Discovering the Laws of Eshnunna, excavating Tell Harmal and Dur-Kurigalzu
- Notable work: Akkadian to Arabic translation of the Epic of Gilgamesh

Taha Baqir (Arabic: طه باقر Taha Baqir) (1912 – 28 February 1984) was an Iraqi Assyriologist, archaeologist, cuneiformist, linguist, and historian. He served as the curator of the National Museum of Iraq and is considered a founding figure in Iraqi archaeology.

Baqir is known for his direct Akkadian to Arabic translation of the Epic of Gilgamesh, the decipherment of Babylonian mathematical tablets, and the discovery of the Laws of Eshnunna. Alongside his colleague Fuad Safar, Baqir was among the first domestic archaeologists to lead excavations in Iraq, a practice previously dominated by foreign institutions.

== Early life and education ==
Baqir was born in 1912 in Al Hillah, located in the Babylon region of Ottoman Iraq. After completing his secondary education, he attended the American University of Beirut. He subsequently moved to the United States to study archaeology and Assyriology at the Oriental Institute of the University of Chicago. Following his postgraduate studies in ancient history and Near Eastern languages, he returned to Iraq in 1938 to work for the Directorate General of Antiquities.

== Archaeological career ==
Between 1945 and 1963, Baqir and Muhammed Ali Mustafa led excavations at Tell Harmal, the site of the ancient city of Shaduppum in modern-day Baghdad. The team unearthed nearly 3,000 clay tablets containing administrative, mathematical, and literary records from the Old Babylonian period. At this site, Baqir discovered the Laws of Eshnunna, a legal code predating the Code of Hammurabi. He also found and translated geometric and algebraic tablets that provided new context for ancient Babylonian mathematics.

Baqir directed excavations at Dur-Kurigalzu (Aqar Quf), a Kassite administrative center. His team excavated the city's ziggurat, a palace complex, and painted murals, publishing the results in Iraq in the mid-1940s. He was also involved in excavations at Tell al-Dhiba'i, Babylon, Shahrizur, Dokan, and Darband-i-Khan.

During his tenure, Baqir supported the integration of women into the field. In the early 1960s, he authorized the recently graduated archaeologist Lamia Al-Gailani Werr to conduct fieldwork at Tell al-Dhiba'i, making her one of the first Iraqi women to lead an excavation.

== Academic and administrative roles ==
From 1941 to 1960, Baqir taught ancient history and civilization at the Institute of Higher Education and the University of Baghdad. In 1951, he assisted in establishing the Department of Archaeology at the university's College of Arts, where he taught Sumerian and Akkadian languages until 1963. He served as the vice president of the University of Baghdad from 1961 to 1963.

Within the Iraqi Department of Antiquities, Baqir worked as a technical expert (1938–1941), secretary and curator of the National Museum of Iraq (1941–1953), Associate Director of Antiquities (1953–1958), and Inspector General of Excavations (1958). In 1958, following the 14 July Revolution, Prime Minister Abd al-Karim Qasim offered Baqir the position of Minister of Education. Baqir declined the political post, reportedly stating that "antiquities are better than the Ministry," and accepted the role of General Director of Antiquities instead, which he held until 1963.

In 1945, Baqir founded the bilingual academic journal Sumer and served as its primary editor until 1958. Following the 1963 Ba'athist coup in Iraq, Baqir moved to Libya, where he worked as a consultant for the Libyan Department of Antiquities and taught at the University of Libya from 1965 to 1970. He later returned to Baghdad to resume teaching and served as vice president of the Iraqi Academy of Sciences in 1983.

== Notable publications and translations ==
Baqir was fluent in Arabic, English, French, and German, and could read ancient Aramaic, Akkadian, and Sumerian. His ability to read cuneiform script directly from excavated clay tablets earned him the nickname "The Clay Reader" among his colleagues.

He published an Akkadian-to-Arabic translation of the Epic of Gilgamesh. His 1955 Arabic-language textbook, Muqaddimah fi Tarikh al-Hadarat al-Qadimah (An Introduction to the History of Ancient Civilizations), became a standard text in Middle Eastern universities. Furthermore, he translated major Western historical works into Arabic, including Arnold J. Toynbee's A Study of History and Seton Lloyd's Twin Rivers.

== Death and legacy ==
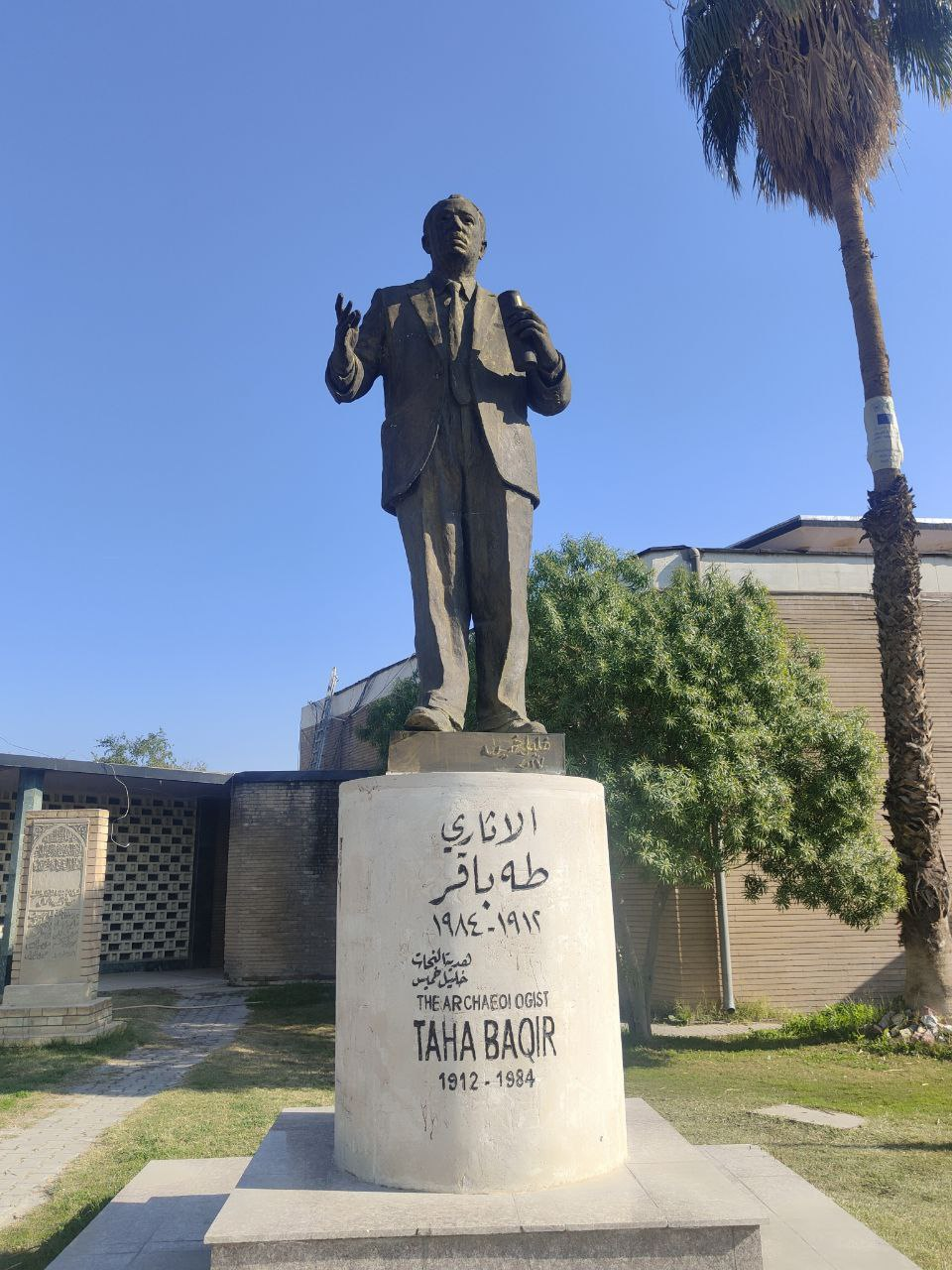
Statue of Taha Baqir at the College of Arts, University of Baghdad

Baqir died on 28 February 1984. A statue of him stands at the College of Arts at the University of Baghdad.

== See also ==
- Laws of Eshnunna
- Shaduppum
- Behnam Abu Alsoof
- Donny George Youkhanna
- Khazal Al-Majidi
- Hormuz Rassam
- Lamia Al-Gailani Werr
