= Arthur Amiaud =

French Assyriologist and philologist (1849–1889)

Arthur Amiaud (8 January 1849, in Villefagnan – 22 May 1889, in Paris) was a French Assyriologist and philologist.

Initially a law student in Poitiers, he later devoted his energies towards philology, taking classes in Semitic languages at the École pratique des hautes études and the Collège de France in Paris. While a student, he was introduced to Assyrian and Babylonian studies by way of influence from Julius Oppert. Following graduation, he became a lecturer in Syriac languages at the École des lettres d'Alger (1880). In 1881 he returned to Paris, where he served as a lecturer at the École pratique des hautes études. In 1888 he was appointed director-adjoint of the school.

Amiaud is remembered for his research of Babylonian and Assyrian inscriptions. In his later years he dedicated himself mostly to the study of the Telloh Inscriptions. He died in Paris on 30 May 1889, age 40.

== Published works ==
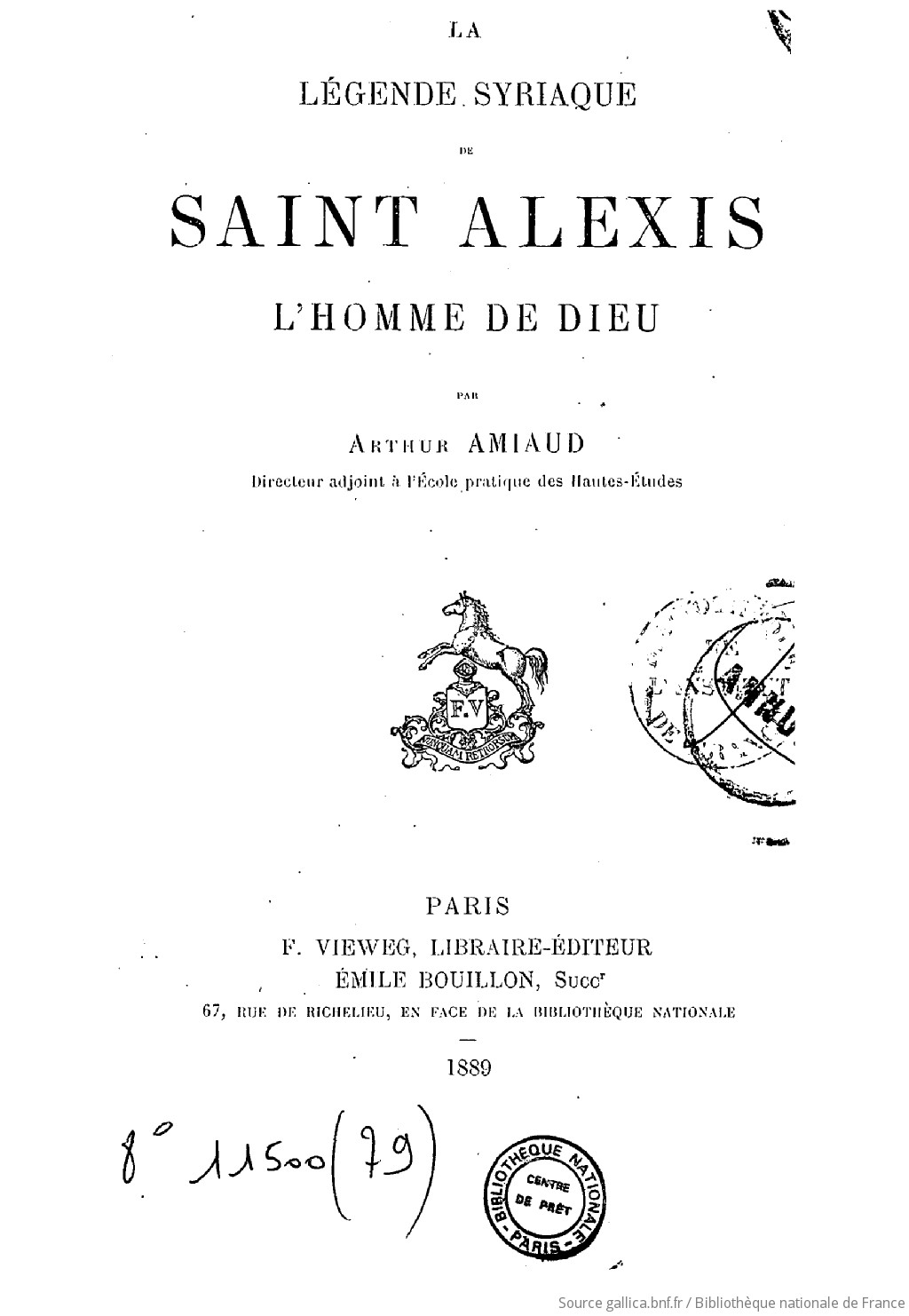
Page de titre de La légende syriaque de saint Alexis

- Matériaux pour le dictionnaire assyrien, 1881 – Materials for an Assyrian dictionary.
- La légende syriaque de saint Alexis, l'homme de Dieu, 1884 – The Syriac legend of St. Alexis, a man of God.
- Découvertes en Chaldée, Paris, E. Leroux, 1884-1912; (2 volumes, co-authors: Ernest de Sarzec, Léon Heuzey, François Thureau-Dangin) – Discoveries in Chaldaea.
- Cyrus, roi de Perse, 1886 – Cyrus, King of Persia.
- Tableau comparé des écritures babylonienne et assyrienne, archaiques et modernes : avec classement des signes d'après leur forme archaique, 1887, (with Lucien Méchineau) – Comparative table of Babylonian and Assyrian writings, ancient and modern.
- Les nombres ordinaux en Assyrien, 1889 – Assyrian ordinal numbers.
- Les inscriptions de Salmanasar II : roi d'Assyrie (860-824), 1890 (with Jean-Vincent Scheil) – Inscriptions of Shalmaneser, King of Assyria.

He was the author of articles in the following publications: The Journal asiatique, the Revue Critique, the Revue d'Assyriologie, the "Babylonian and Oriental Record", and the Zeitschrift für Assyriologie.
