= Jean-Vincent Scheil =

French Dominican priest and archaeologist

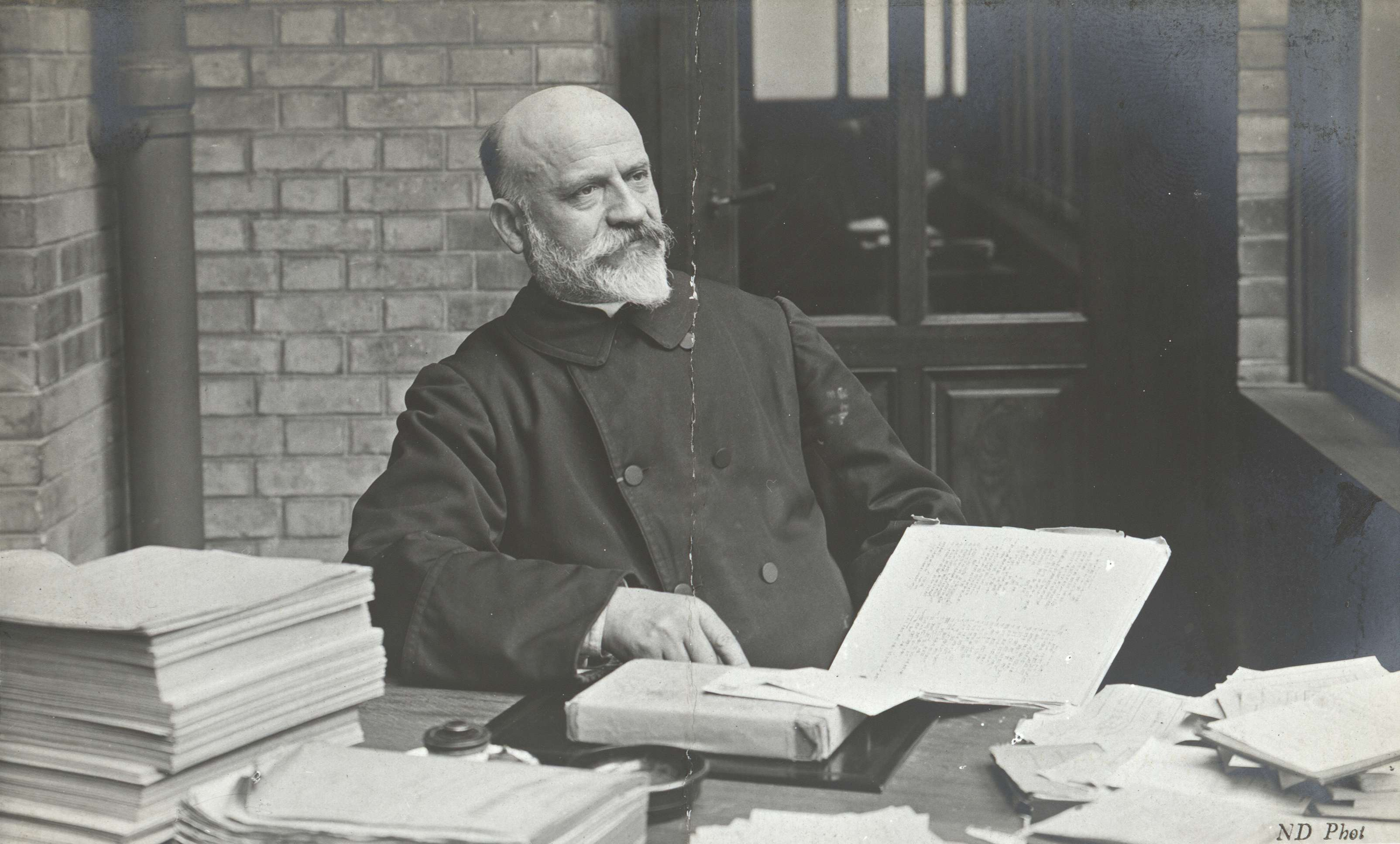
Professor Scheil's class (assyriology) at the Sorbonne, School for Advanced Studies (Bibliothèque de la Sorbonne, NuBIS)

Father Jean-Vincent Scheil (born 10 June 1858, Kœnigsmacker – died 21 September 1940, Paris) was a French Dominican scholar and Assyriologist. He is credited as the discoverer of the Code of Hammurabi in Persia. In 1911 he came into possession of the Scheil dynastic tablet and first translated it. After being ordained in 1887, he took courses in Egyptology and Assyriology at the École des Hautes Études, and was a student at the Collège de France, where he was a pupil of Assyriologist Julius Oppert. In 1890/91 as a member of the French Archaeological Mission of Cairo, he took part in excavations at Thebes. In 1892 he conducted excavations near Baghdad for the Ottoman Imperial Museum, followed by work in Constantinople, where he was tasked with classifying and drafting a catalog of Assyrian, Chaldean and Egyptian antiquities of the museum.

In 1895 he became a lecturer at the École Pratique des Hautes Études, where in 1908 he was named its director. In 1908 he also became a member of the Académie des Inscriptions et Belles-Lettres. In 1923 he became an officer of the Légion d'honneur.

In 1901 he discovered Hammurabi's Law Code at Susa, of which, he subsequently translated and published the 250 articles of the stele containing approximately 3600 lines; La loi de Hammourabi (vers 2000 av. J.-C.), (1904).

== Selected works ==
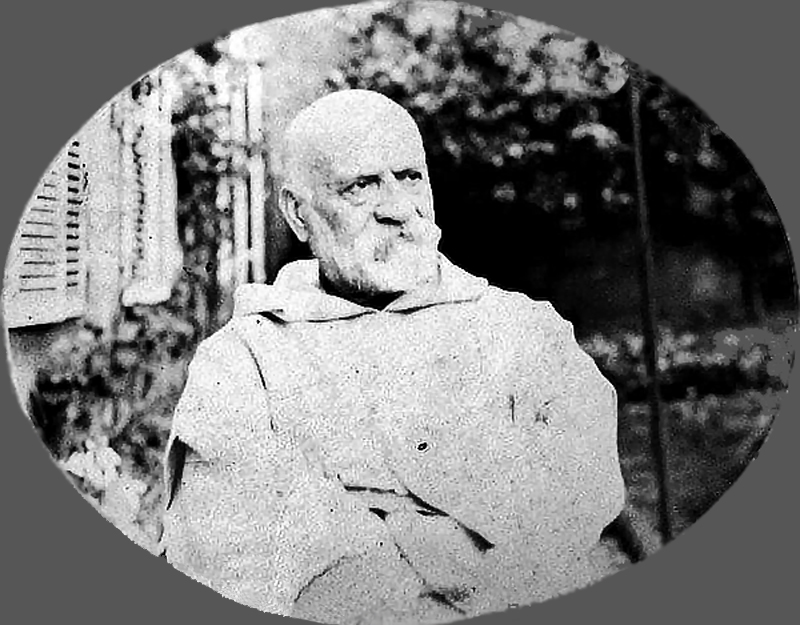
- Les inscriptions de Salmanasar II : roi d'Assyrie (860-824), 1890 (with Arthur Amiaud) Inscriptions of Shalmaneser, King of Assyria.
- Une saison de fouilles à Sippar, 1902 – A season of excavations at Sippar.
- La loi de Hammourabi (vers 2000 av. J.-C.), 1904 – The law of Hammurabi, circa 2000 BC.
- Annales de Tukulti Ninip II, roi d'Assyrie 889-884, 1909 (with Joseph Étienne Gautier) – Annals of Tukulti Ninip II.
- Le prisme S d'Assaraddon, roi d'Assyrie 681-668, 1914 – The prism of Esarhaddon.
- Recueil de lois assyriennes : texte assyrien en transcription avec traduction française et index, 1921 – Collection of Assyrian laws.
- Inscriptions des Achéménides à Suse, 1929 – Inscription of the Achaemenids at Susa.OCLC Classify published works
