= Gwendolyn Leick =

Austrian anthropologist, assyriologist and writer (1951–2022)

Portrait of Gwendolyn Leick

Gwendolyn Leick (25 February 1951 – 19 November 2022) was an Austrian-born British historian and Assyriologist who wrote multiple books and encyclopedias in English about ancient Mesopotamia.

== Early life ==
Gwendolyn Leick was born on 25 February 1951 in Oberaichwald, Austria, to parents Reginald and Herta Leick. Her father was a physician and her mother was a social worker.

Leick immigrated from Austria to the United Kingdom when she was twenty-five. She stated that she was "lured by the British Museum and the cosmopolitan life in London." She married her husband Charlemagne Kanon on 31 July 2001. She has two sons:George Sebastian Howell and Joseph Ibrahim Leick.and 5 grandchildren: Vinicius, Caetano , Lily , Mabel and Ibrahim.

== Career ==
Leick completed her D.Phil. at Karl Franzens University in 1977 (thesis titled "Die akkadischen Fluchformeln des 3. und 2. Jahrtausends"). Leick has stated that she chose to study Assyriology, because she "thought it was a difficult, arcane, and somewhat esoteric subject which would not lead to a normal career." After discovering that she "was not particularly gifted to do epigraphical work", she devoted her career towards "communicat[ing] and transmit[ing] the results of Assyriological scholarship to a wider audience, to make the field more accessible." To this end, she has written numerous encyclopedic dictionaries, which she regards as "the most user-friendly, concise, and straightforward way to access information on matters concerning the ancient Near East."

Leick briefly worked as a cultural tour guide.

== Personal life and death ==
Leick took up Olympic weightlifting at the age of 52 and was a three-time world champion. She was the subject of a documentary, Gwendolyn (2017), directed by Ruth Kaaserer, which followed Leick during her preparations for the 2012 European Masters Weightlifting Championships in Azerbaijan.

Leick died on 19 November 2022, at the age of 71.

== Bibliography ==
Despite her Austrian origins, all but one of her books were written in English, which she described as "the most accommodating, rich, and ecumenical of modern languages which allows so many people, regardless of their original language, to find a worldwide audience." Her notable books include:

- A Dictionary of Ancient Near Eastern Architecture (published by Routledge 1988)
- A Dictionary of Ancient Near Eastern Mythology (published by Routledge 1991; 2nd edition published 1999)
- Sex and Eroticism in Mesopotamian Literature (published 1994 by Routledge)
- Who's Who in the Ancient Near East (published 1999 by Routledge)
- Mesopotamia: The Invention of the City (published 2002 by Penguin Books)
- Historical Dictionary of Mesopotamia (published 2003 by Scarecrow Press)
- The Babylonians: An Introduction (published 2003 by Routledge)
- General editor of The Babylonian World (published 2006 by Routledge)
- Tombs of the Great Leaders: A Contemporary Guide
- Gertrude, Mabel, May: An ABC of Gertrude Stein's Love Triangle (published 2019 by Grey Suit Editions UK)
- Franckstraße 31 (published 2021 by Edition Korrespondenzen)
- Franckstrasse 31 (published 2022 by Greysuit Editions UK)
- In der Eselgrube (published 2022 by Edition Korrespondenzen)
