= Vorderasiatisches Museum Berlin =

Archaeological museum in Berlin

Coordinates: 52°31′14.50″N 13°23′48.50″E

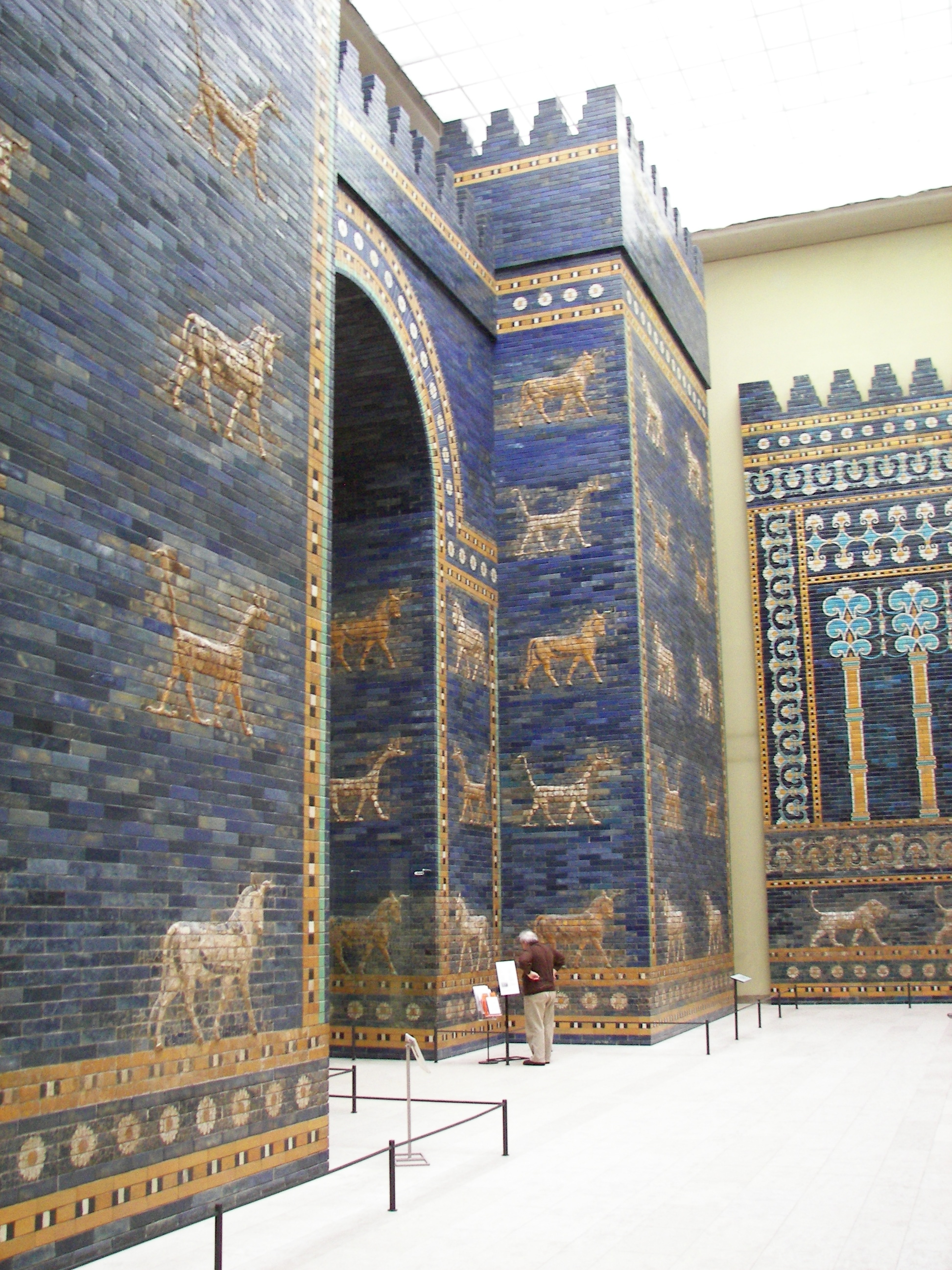
View of the Ishtar Gate

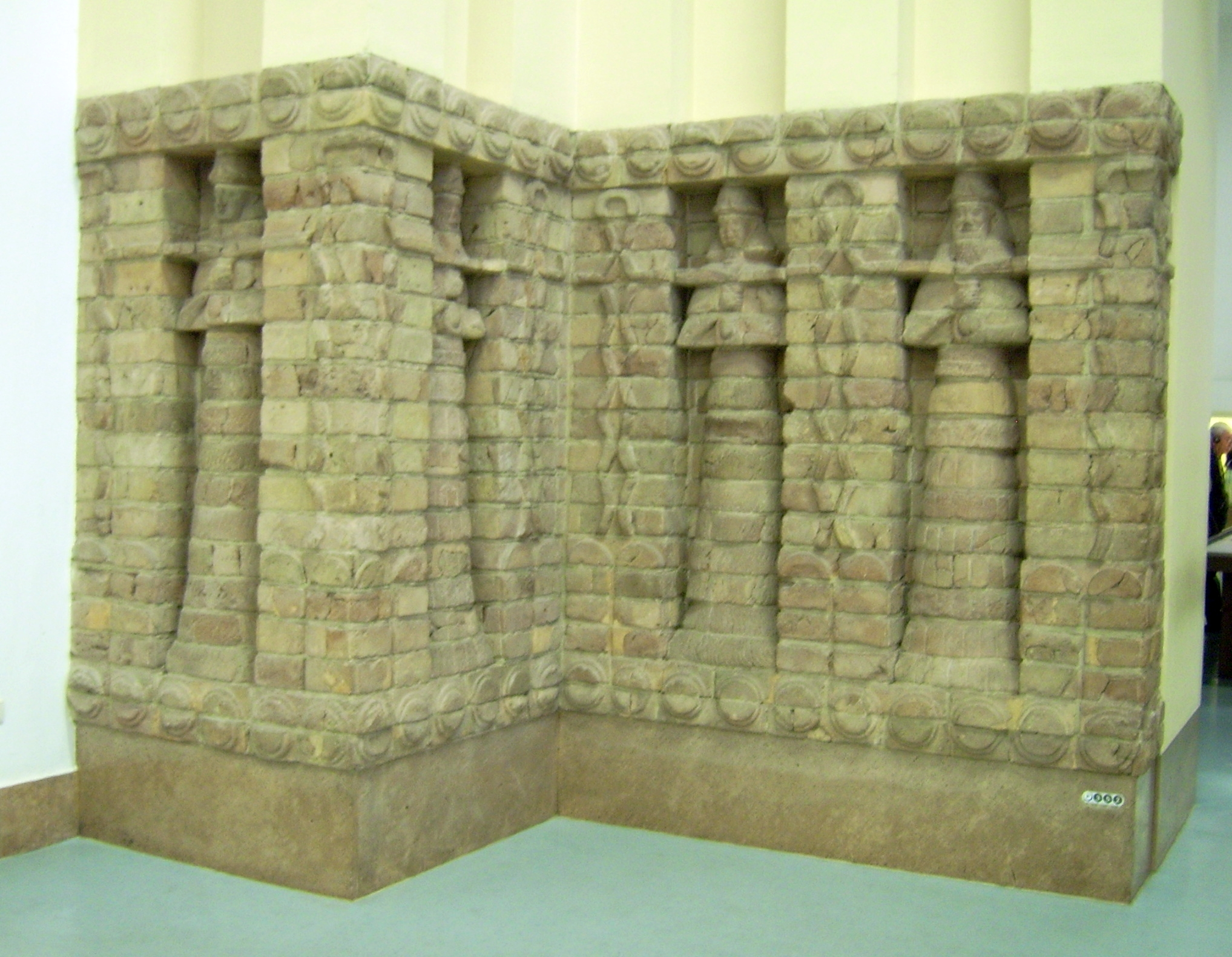
Part of the front of Karaindash's temple to Inanna in Uruk

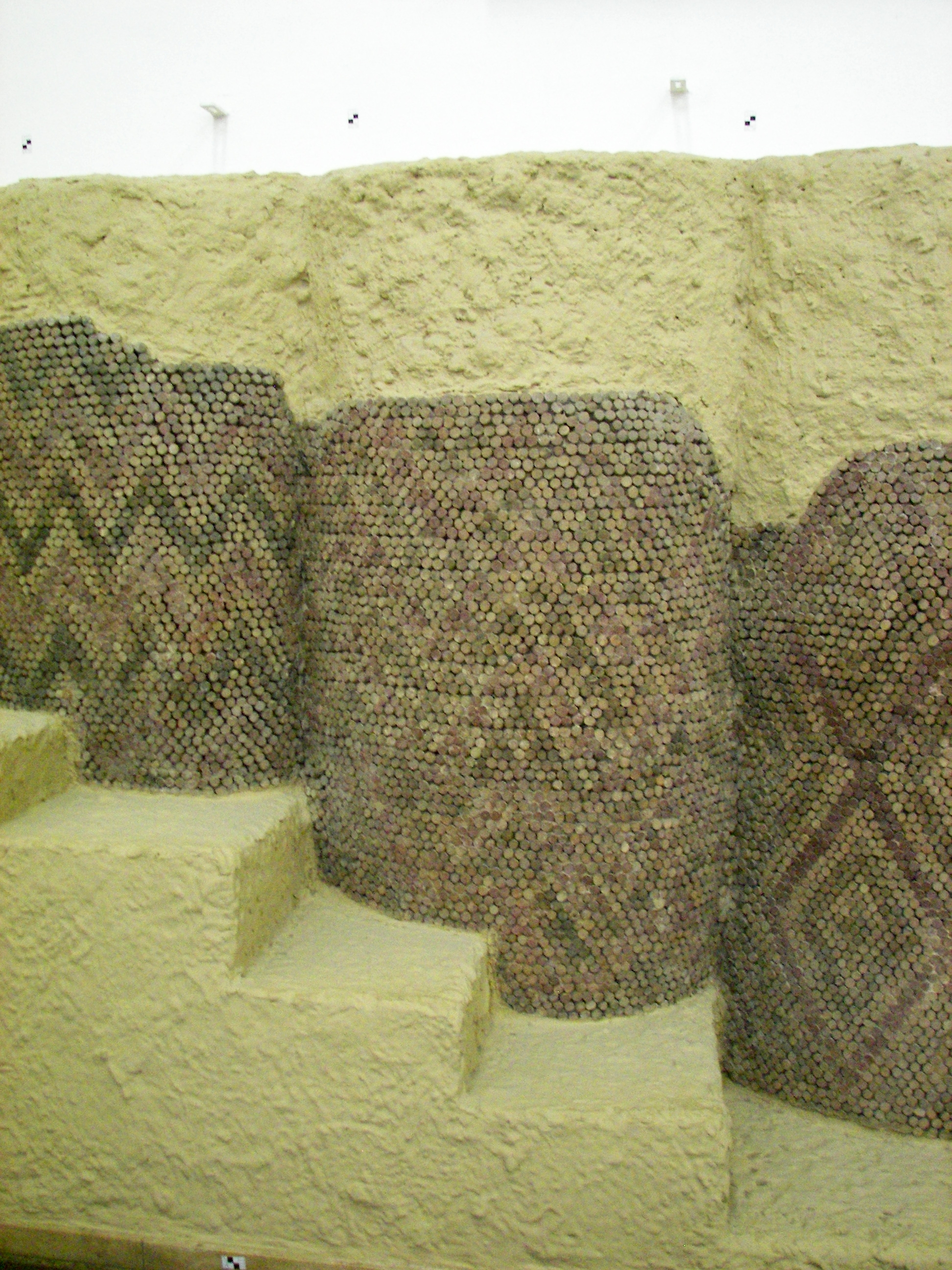
Reconstruction of a mosaic from the Eanna temple

The Vorderasiatisches Museum (German: [ˈfɔʁdɐ.ʔaˌzi̯atɪʃəs muˈzeːʊm], Near East Museum) is an archaeological museum in Berlin. It is in the basement of the south wing of the Pergamon Museum and has one of the world's largest collections of Southwest Asian art. Fourteen halls distributed across 2,000 m^{2} (22,000 sq ft) of exhibition surface display southwest Asian culture spanning six millennia. The exhibits cover a period from the 6th millennium BCE into the time of the Muslim conquests. They originate particularly from today's states of Iraq, Syria and Turkey, with isolated finds also from other areas. Starting with the Neolithic finds, the emphasis of the collection is of finds from Sumer, Babylonia and Assyria, as well as northern Syria and eastern Anatolia.

Excavations in historically important cities like Uruk, Shuruppak, Assur, Hattusha, Tell el Amarna, Tell Halaf (Guzana), Sam'al, Toprakkale and Babylon built the foundation of the museum's collection. Further acquisitions came from Nimrud, Nineveh, Susa and Persepolis. The museum shows finds from the cultures of Sumer, Akkad, Babylonia, Assyria, the Hittites and the Aramaeans. These finds often found their way to Berlin via the German Oriental Society. In 1899, the Middle East Department at the royal museums was created. In 1929, they were provisionally accommodated in the Bode Museum and the Pergamon Museum, where they have been accessible to the public since 1930. During the Second World War, there were hardly any war-related losses. The mobile exhibits, which were taken as art spoilage to the Soviet Union, were returned to East Germany in 1958. The collection had already opened again as the Vorderasiatisches Museum in 1953.

Notable pieces of the collection are the Ishtar Gate and Procession Way of Babylon, remains of the ancient city of Babylon, parts of the Eanna temple and Karaindash's temple to Inanna in Uruk. The museum also has an important number of Southwest Asian stamp and cylinder seals, as well as cuneiform texts. It has more than 200 of the Amarna letters and the larger ("Meissner") fragment (VAT 4105) of the Sippar tablet from the Epic of Gilgamesh, which includes Siduri's advice, unlike later editions of the epic.

At present (2019) Barbara Helwing is the director of the museum, following Markus Hilgert (2014–2018). Previous directors were Beate Salje, Walter Andrae, Gerhard Rudolf Meyer, Liane Jakob-Rost and Evelyn Klengel Brandt, among others.

== Multaka: Museum as Meeting Point ==
In 2015, the museum started a new project for Arabic- and Persian-speaking refugees and other Muslim visitors titled "Multaka - Museum as Meeting Point". This intercultural project organizes guided tours for refugees and migrants designed and offered for free by specially trained guides. The visitor-centered discussions with migrants in their language are focused on the historical origin and history of acquisition of cultural objects, including the visitors' own understanding of their country's cultural heritage. In 2019 the four founding museums in Berlin joined six similar museums in the United Kingdom, Italy, Greece and Switzerland, creating the international Multaka network.

== Literature ==
- Nicola Crüsemann: Vom Zweistromland zum Kupfergraben. Vorgeschichte und Entstehungsjahre (1899–1918) der Vorderasiatischen Abteilung der Berliner Museen vor fach- und kulturpolitischen Hintergründen. Gebrüder Mann, Berlin 2001, ISBN 3-7861-2403-5.
- Nicola Crüsemann (ed.): Vorderasiatisches Museum Berlin. Geschichte und Geschichten zum hundertjährigen Bestehen, Staatliche Museen zu Berlin, Stiftung Preußischer Kulturbesitz, Berlin 2000
- Museen vor fach- und kulturpolitischen Hintergründen, Berlin 2001 (Jahrbuch der Berliner Museen N. F. 42 (2000), Beiheft)
- Beate Salje: Vorderasiatische Museen: gestern, heute, morgen. Berlin, Paris, London, New York; eine Standortbestimmung; Kolloquium aus Anlass des Einhundertjährigen Bestehens des Vorderasiatischen Museums Berlin am 7. Mai 1999, von Zabern, Mainz 2001.
- Joachim Marzahn, Beate Salje (eds.): Wiedererstehendes Assur: 100 Jahre deutsche Ausgrabungen in Assyrien, von Zabern, Mainz 2003.
