= Swedish Evangelical Mission =

Independent organization within the Church of Sweden

- Evangeliska Fosterlands-Stiftelsen
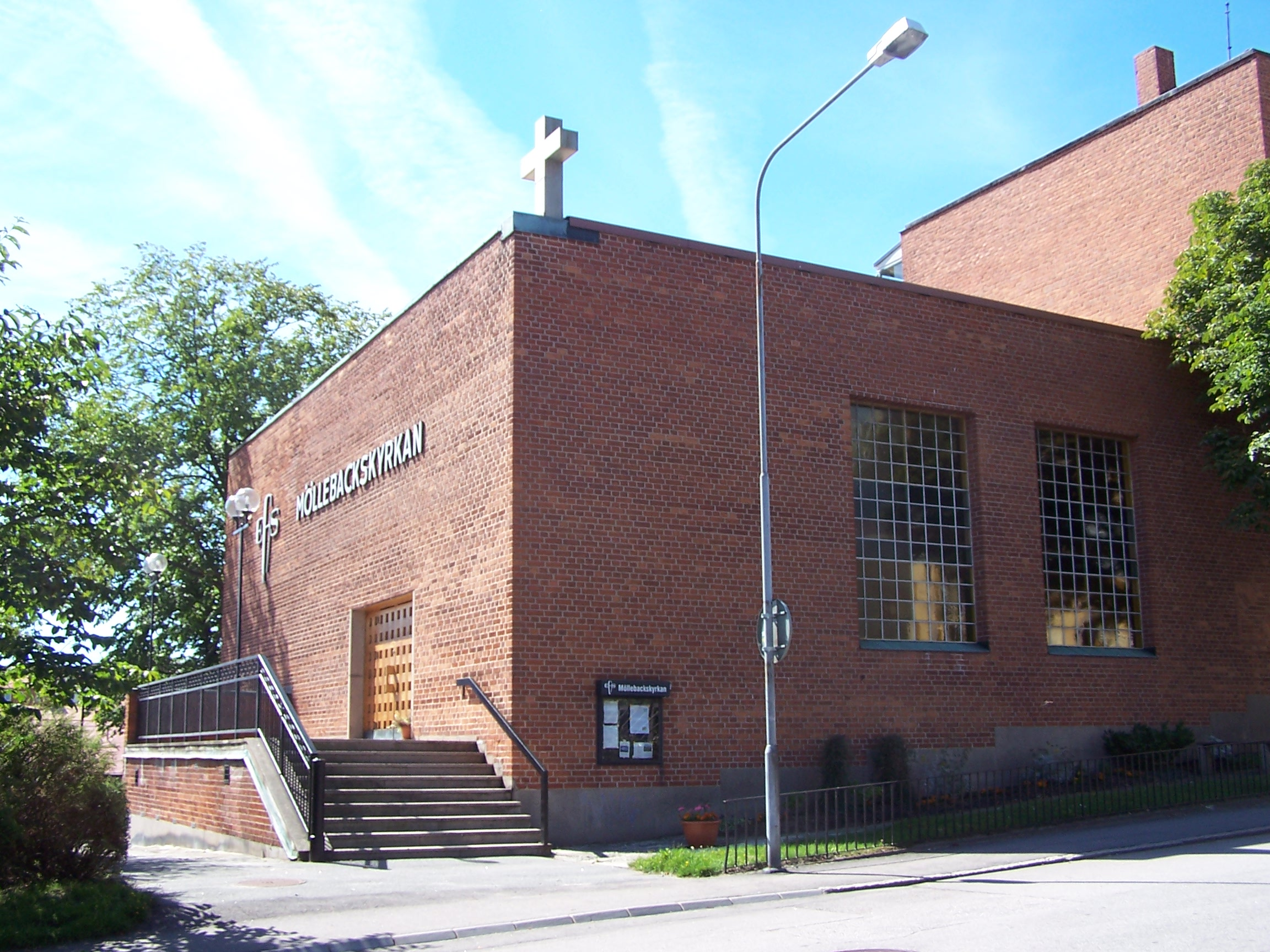
- Möllebacken Church in Karlskrona.
- Classification: Protestant/Lutheran
- Orientation: Low church Lutheran/Evangelical Lutheran
- Origin: 7 May 1856
- Separations: Baptist Union of Sweden
- Other name(s): Fosterländska stiftelsen för Evangelii befrämjande
- Publications: Budbäraren
- Official website: https://www.efs.nu

The Swedish Evangelical Mission (SEM) (Swedish: Evangeliska Fosterlands-Stiftelsen 'Evangelical Homeland Foundation', EFS) is an independent, low-church, New Evangelical (Swedish: nyevangelisk) movement within the Church of Sweden. Described as "middle-of-the-road" due to maintaining its independence within the church while not separating from it, the association emphasizes the importance of lay involvement and is rooted in 19th-century Swedish revivalism and the Mission Friends movement.

== Organization ==
The EFS is a movement within the Church of Sweden and is therefore not a denomination in its own right. The intra-church nature means that the EFS considers itself to be part of the Church of Sweden and the Church of Sweden considers the EFS to be part of it. This is done on the basis of common confession.

As of 2022, EFS has approximately 22,400 members. it is a democratic organization in the social movement tradition (Swedish: folkrörelsen) and is made up of about 350 affiliated local associations (missionary associations and EFS groups, with at least former names such as Evangelical Lutheran Missionary Society, Swedish Lutheran Missionary Society, Missionary Society, Chapel Society and Evangelical Lutheran Missionary Society) organized in seven districts and with a common national organization based in Uppsala, Sweden. Most of the local associations function as autonomous entities, not entirely unlike free church congregations, but there are also a number of cooperative and collaborative churches where a missionary association or EFS group runs a local church in cooperation with a congregation within the Church of Sweden. In some cases, church activities are carried out in cooperation with other Christian denominations. EFS's children's and youth activities are organized in Salt, which has about 6,500 members. Scouting activities are also conducted there, from 2014 under the name Salt Scout (formerly EFS Scout), with about 2,000 members.

EFS is involved in mission work in Ethiopia, Eritrea, Tanzania, Malawi and India and has a couple of sailors' stations.

The EFS mission director has been Kerstin Oderhem since 2017. She is the 20th mission director of EFS and the first woman. She succeeded Stefan Holmström, who took up the post of mission director on 1 June 2009. Since the annual meeting in 2019, Lars Olov Eriksson is the chairman of the board.

== Theology ==
The EFS shares the Evangelical Lutheran confession of the Church of Sweden, but on this basis emphasizes in particular the need for an individual position on faith and that this should have consequences for daily life. The individualistic trait is echoed in the movement's emphasis on the universal priesthood, inherited from Pietism: the idea that every Christian lives in a direct relationship with God, without the need for mediators in the form of ordained ministers. This emphasis is evident in the strong role of lay people in all activities, including church services.

The emphasis on personal commitment to Jesus Christ has also provided the theological basis for the movement's extensive missionary work.

== History ==
=== Founding in 1856 ===
In the mid-1800s, the growing free-church movement as well as foreign churches such as the Free Church of Scotland and the Methodist Church began to influence Swedish Lutherans, such as revivalist preacher and writer Carl Olof Rosenius, in a Pietist direction centered on conversion, revival, and missions work (see Mission Friends). This included the influence of Scottish pastor James Lumsden, whose impact on Lutherans such as Carl Axel Torén, Peter Fjellstedt, and Hans Jacob Lundborg led them to see the need to form a mission society to bring revival to the Church of Sweden. At the same time, the rise in free church members in Swedish society began to put pressure on the state church's sense of unity.

In 1855, Fjellstedt proposed the foundation of a mission. The EFS, originally Fosterländska Stiftelsen för Evangelii befrämjande, was founded on 7 May 1856 on the initiative of Lundborg, active in Lindesberg, and with the support of Rosenius. The aim was to lead the new evangelical revival movement on an Evangelical Lutheran path, faithful to the Church of Sweden, and to counter the free-church movement.

A number of free-church colporteurs, itinerant sellers of Christian literature, were involved early on; however, many left the following year to form the Baptist Union of Sweden.

=== Buildings ===
The early gathering places were called shelters (hyddor) or mission shelters. Examples are the shelter in Ede, Krokom Municipality, and the mission shelter on Kungsholmen in Stockholm. There was also a mission shelter on Styrmansgatan in Helsinki, Finland. A similar term is chapel (bönhus), such as Ragvaldsträsk Chapel in the municipality of Skellefteå.

In 1857, the EFS bought Scottish Methodist missionary George Scott's former church building, consecrated in 1840 as the first free church in Sweden, after he was forced to leave the country due to his preaching. Under the EFS, the church became Bethlehem Church.

=== Publications ===
In 1857 the newspaper Budbäraren was founded with Bernhard Wadström as editor.

One of the most important tasks of the EFS was the distribution of Christian literature and tracts, which was largely carried out by colporteurs. Much of the literature was produced by the EFS publishing house, which was founded in the same year as the movement and since 1992 has been part of Verbum Förlag. The first book published by the EFS publishing house was Luther's Church Postil, in 1860, which was published in eight editions and 70,000 copies.

=== Missions work ===
Rosenius' focus on foreign missions led the EFS, which had focused on domestic missions work, to decide as of their 1861 annual meeting to carry out foreign missionary work. The following year, the Evangeliska Fosterlands-Stiftelsens Missions-Institut, now Johannelunds Teologiska Högskola, was founded for this purpose. Fjellstedt and Bishop Samuel Gobat influenced the organization to begin mission work among the Oromo people in the Horn of Africa. In 1865 the EFS' first missionaries, C. J. Carlsson, L. J. Lange, and P. E. Kjellberg were sent to East Africa in what is now Eritrea. This was the first foreign mission project undertaken by the Church of Sweden or Swedish church organisations. In the early 1880s, four young missionary students from Eritrea were sent to Sweden for training at Johannelund: Onesimus Nesib, Marqos Girmai, Tewolde-Medhin Gebre-Medhin (1860–1930), Haile-Mikael Kidanu (1856–1926) and Hagena Natanael (Jigo). The latter died in Sweden in 1888, but the others returned to their homeland as graduates and continued their missionary work among their compatriots as pastors.

In Estonia, the organization also undertook mission work among the Estonian Swedes until 1887 and again after 1918, when the Republic of Estonia was founded.

The EFS has later also carried out missionary work in other parts of East Africa (Ethiopia, Somalia, Tanzania) as well as in India, Israel and other countries.

In the United States, the EFS cooperated with the Augustana Synod, a Swedish Lutheran synod which shared some connections. The EFS would later start an official American mission in 1873.

==== Sailors' mission ====
Influenced by the Norwegian priest who started the Norwegian Seaman's Mission, Johan Storjohann, the EFS officially started its mission work to Swedish sailors in 1869, although it had been working in this capacity for several years by this time. It merged with the Church of Sweden Abroad in 1974.

=== Doctrinal issues and major splits, 1878 and 1911 ===
The EFS has on a number of occasions split over doctrinal issues, leading to breakaways.

Around 1878 there was disagreement over the meaning of the Atonement of Jesus, the Augsburg Confession and Communion; "[p]astors concerned with the growing radicalism and rationalism regarded the Swedish Evangelical Mission as an important bulwark." Paul Petter Waldenström was dismissed from his position as an EFS representative. American preacher D. L. Moody, who placed a strong emphasis on common Christian mission work despite denominational differences, was a strong influence on Waldenström – and other Swedish Christians. Thus, when a proposal to change the confessional position of the Evangelical Mission to allow others such as the Mission Friends, Baptists, and Methodists was rejected at the 1878 conference, the Swedish Mission Covenant was created that same year under Waldenström's leadership, which a number of missionary societies and members then joined. In 2003, it changed its name to the Swedish Mission Church (SMK) and in 2011, together with the Baptist Union of Sweden and the United Methodist Church in Sweden, a new denomination was formed called the Uniting Church in Sweden.

In 1893, Adolf Kolmodin became the organization's mission director, though not without controversy: although he "had obtained his chair in bitter competition with a person advocating the new trend of critical scholarship in Bible exegesis, he was himself considered too 'modern'."

Missionssällskapet Bibeltrogna Vänner broke off from the EFS in 1911 under the leadership of Axel B. Svensson, a believer in verbal inspiration who, among other things, objected to Kolmodin's closer ties to the Church of Sweden. It is now called Evangelisk Luthersk Mission – Bibeltrogna Vänner.

=== History after 1940 ===
In 1943, the first female board member, Isabella Stolpe, was elected.

During the 1950s, when the Church of Sweden was rocked by struggles over the issue of female clergy, EFS members were divided on the theological right of women to the ministry. However, at the 1963 annual conference, a firm rejection of the high-church view of ministry and church was made as a justification for not accepting female clergy, emphasizing that the decisive factor is not who preaches but what is preached.

In 1987, the EFS began scouting activities. Budbäraren had its first female editor-in-chief in 1990 in Inga Belani.

Through decisions in 1989 and 1990, ties to the Church of Sweden were strengthened and since then EFS preachers/pastors have been ordained by the church. They are usually trained at Johannelunds Teologiska Högskola, founded in Stockholm in 1862 as EFS Missionsinstitut and located in Uppsala since 1970, next to Heidenstams torg in the Löten area. Since the early 1980s, priests for service in the Church of Sweden have also been trained here.

In 1995, Birgitta Eriksson was appointed the first female president of the EFS. In 2005, the children's and youth association Salt was started.

=== Late-1960s Bible controversy ===
At the end of the 1960s, there was another debate on biblical views within the EFS, very similar in content to that of 1911. In connection with Johannelund's move to Uppsala and the start of a collaboration with Uppsala University, rector Torsten Nilsson felt it was timely to reflect on the prevailing biblical view in the movement. Nilsson's method of interpreting the Bible can be classified as moderately historical-critical, where he himself believed that Scripture needed to be interpreted Christologically and soteriologically (from the perspective of salvation).

The majority of the EFS national board supported Nilsson's view, but a number of members were very critical. This led to a lengthy debate in the newspaper Budbäraren and the EFS of Västerbotten's newspaper Vårt budskap. The critics made accusations against Nilsson and Johannelund teachers Birger Olsson and Agne Nordlander. The harshest criticism, however, was directed at Nilsson. He chose to resign from the EFS in 1969 because he no longer felt that he had the unanimous support of the board. Twelve members expressed their support for Nilsson in Budbäraren, while four members expressed reservations.

The effects of the debate were also that doctor of theology David Hedegård resigned his membership in the EFS and became one of the co-founders of the Biblicum Foundation, which would work to preserve a more traditional view of the Bible. A small group of preachers from Västerbotten, including Tore Nilsson, left the EFS and founded the Lutheran Bible Study Foundation.

=== Encounter with prosperity theology ===
In the 1980s, Livets Ord, a Word of Faith megachurch, established itself in Uppsala and began to recruit members, some of them from the EFS. With Livets Ord, prosperity theology spread, which also influenced the EFS in different parts of the country. In response, the EFS publishing house published a number of books against prosperity theology during the 1980s and events with links to prosperity theology were banned from advertising in Budbäraren. However, the tensions that arose in the early days have eased in the more than 20 years since, and reconciliation processes have also begun in some places.

=== Church planting ===
Since 2003, the EFS has been actively working as a movement to plant new mission societies and EFS groups. New communities have been started in Uppsala, Hisingen, Timrå and Stockholm.

== Notable members ==
Lina Sandell was employed by the EFS from 1861 to 1864 to translate the works of others and write her own songs. She wrote over 1,700 poems and hymns, including some of the most famous Swedish hymn lyrics: "Tryggare kan ingen vara", "Blott en dag", "Jesus för världen givit sitt liv" and "Jag kan icke räkna dem alla". From 1889 she was editor of the EFS's educational periodical Barnens vän.

From 1906 to 1918, Axel Rappe, one of Sweden's most successful military officers of the late 19th century, was chairman of the foundation.

Ruth Forsling was a prominent liberal activist and politician affiliated with the EFS.

== Education ==
The EFS has its origins in the Läsare revival movement, to which Rosenius and other influential figures belonged, so-called because of its strong emphasis on the individual's reading of religious works, including the Bible, and interpretations of it. It is therefore natural that popular education has and has had a strong position within the movement. Today it runs a college, Johannelunds Teologiska Högskola, and eight folk high schools: Glimåkra, Hagaberg, Hjälmared, Åredalen, Mellansel, Solvik, Strömbäck and Sundsgården Folk High School.

== See also ==
- Pro Fide et Christianismo, another association within the Church of Sweden
