= Blott en dag (album) =

Studio album by Carola
- Released: 21 October 1998
- Recorded: Oslo, Norway, 1998
- Genres: Gospel, hymn
- Labels: BMG, Rival
- Producer: Erik Hillestad

Carola chronology
Det bästa av Carola (1997)	Blott en dag (1998)	Jul i Betlehem (1999)

Blott en dag is the ninth studio album by the Swedish singer Carola Häggkvist. It was released on 21 October 1998 in Sweden and Norway. The album consists of Christian hymns written by Lina Sandell.

The title comes from the lead song. "Blott en dag" by Lina Sandell (words, 1865) and Oscar Ahnfelt (music, 1872) was translated into English as "Day by Day" by Andrew Skoog in 1921.

== Track listing ==
1. Blott en dag
2. Jag är en gäst och främling
3. Är det sant att Jesus är min broder
4. Modersvingen
5. O Jesu, öppna du mitt öga
6. Jesus för världen givit sitt liv
7. Gör det lilla du kan
8. Tryggare kan ingen vara
9. Aldrig är jag utan fara
10. Jag kan icke räkna dem alla
11. Herrens nåd är var morgon ny
12. Bred dina vida vingar

== Charts ==
Chart (1998)	Peak position
Norwegian Albums (VG-lista)	32
Swedish Albums (Sverigetopplistan)	24

== Release history ==
Country	Date
Norway	21 October 1998
Sweden	21 October 1998
