= Day by Day (hymn) =

1865 Christian hymn by Lina Sandell

- Christian hymn by Oscar Ahnfelt
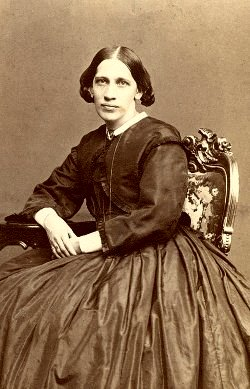
- Lina Sandell
- Native name: Blott en dag
- Genre: Hymn
- Occasion: Funeral
- Text: Lina Sandell
- Language: Swedish
- Meter: 10.9.10.9 D
- Melody: "Blott en dag" by Oscar Ahnfelt

"Day by Day (and with Each Passing Moment)" is a Christian hymn written in 1865 by Lina Sandell several years after she had witnessed the tragic drowning death of her father. It is a hymn of assurance used in American congregational singing.

Sandell-Berg was a prolific Swedish hymn writer. Two of her hymns, "Day By Day" and "Children of the Heavenly Father", are widely known in the United States. The earliest and most popular English translation of "Day by Day" is by Andrew L. Skoog, a Swedish immigrant to the United States. It started appearing in American hymnals in the latter half of the 1920s, and its popularity has increased since then. The tune was composed in 1872 by Oscar Ahnfelt.

The hymn's Swedish name is "Blott en dag" (its first three words), meaning "just one day" or "just another day". In Sweden and Finland, it is popular at funerals. It was recorded by Carola Häggkvist in 1998 on the album Blott en dag. Other Swedish recordings include one in 1965 by Curt & Roland and on Anna-Lena Löfgren's 1972 Christmas album, Nu tändas tusen juleljus.

== Lyrics ==
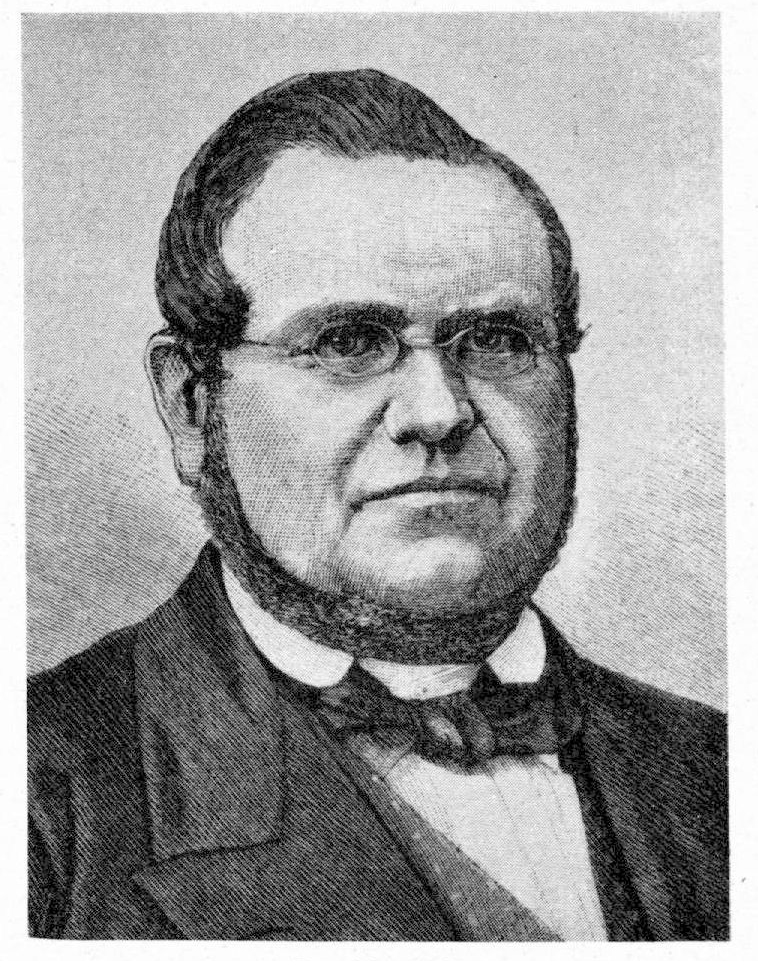
Oscar Ahnfelt

1. Day by day and with each passing moment,
Strength I find to meet my trials here;
Trusting in my Father's wise bestowment,
I've no cause for worry or for fear.
He whose heart is kind beyond all measure
Gives unto each day what He deems best--
Lovingly, its part of pain and pleasure,
Mingling toil with peace and rest.

2. Ev'ry day the Lord Himself is near me
With a special mercy for each hour;
All my cares He fain would bear, and cheer me,
He whose name is Counselor and Pow'r.
The protection of His child and treasure
Is a charge that on Himself He laid;
"As thy days, thy strength shall be in measure,"
This the pledge to me He made.

3. Help me then in ev'ry tribulation
So to trust Thy promises, O Lord,
That I lose not faith's sweet consolation
Offered me within Thy holy Word.
Help me, Lord, when toil and trouble meeting,
E'er to take, as from a father's hand,
One by one, the days, the moments fleeting,
Till I reach the promised land.

Robert Leaf's translation from the Swedish Lutheran Book of Worship hymnal is:

Day by day, your mercies attend me,
Bringing comfort to my anxious soul.
Day by day the blessings Lord, you send me
Draw me nearer to my heavenly goal.
Love divine, beyond all mortal measure,
Brings to naught the burdens of my quest;
Savior lead me to the home I treasure,
Where at last I find eternal rest.
