= Ernst Olson =

Swedish-American journalist (1870–1958)

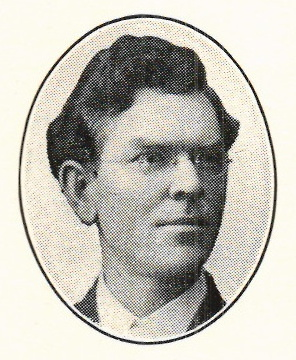
- Born: Ernst Wilhelm Olson; 16 March 1870; Mjölkalånga, Finja, Scania, Sweden
- Died: 6 October 1958 (aged 88); Chicago, Illinois, United States
- Occupation(s): Journalist, publicist, writer, translator
- Spouses: Anna Elizabeth Strand (m. 1899; died 1924) Johanna Magnusson-Stock (m. 1930; died 1937) Hanna Morris Brown (m. 1940)

Ernst Wilhelm (William) Olson (16 March 1870 – 6 October 1958) was a Swedish-American journalist, publicist, writer, and translator. He has been described as "one of Swedish-America's foremost literary figures".

== Biography ==
Olson was born to Johannes Olson and Johanna Gran in Mjölkalånga, Finja, Scania, Sweden. Olson emigrated with his parents, four brothers, and five sisters to the United States in 1878. He grew up in Swedeburg, Nebraska, and attended Luther Academy in Wahoo, Nebraska, and Augustana College in Rock Island, Illinois. He received his master's degree from Bethany College and doctorate in philosophy from Augustana College.

He worked for a time as editor-in-chief of Nya Pressen, and journalist and editor-in-chief of Fosterlandet in Chicago from 1896 to 1900 and Svenska Tribunen from 1900 to 1905, after which he went into publishing. He was publishing editor of Engberg-Holmberg from 1906 to 1911. From 1911 Olson was publishing editor of the Swedish-American firm Augustana Book Concern. He was editor of Ungdomsvännen from 1914 to 1918. In 1917, the monthly published a poem by Carl Lönnquist critical of American involvement in World War I, causing an uproar. Olson attempted to calm the readers by speaking of the balance between complying with the government and being allowed to criticize it. He also argued that immigrants were more likely to be patriotic, in contrast to prevailing views seeing them as disloyal. However, Olson was unsuccessful and in the end was forced to leave his position.

His writings include A History of the Swedes of Illinois (three volumes, 1908), The Swedish Element in Illinois (1917), Reformation cantata (1917), Pilgrims of the prairie (1929) and contributions to Svenskarna i Amerika (1925). His poetry, with its Romanticist tone, was published in Valda dikter. Selected Poems. Svensk och engelsk diktsamling (1947). Olson also wrote children's literature.

Olson wrote and translated a number of hymns, including translating "The Sign of the Cross I Triumphantly Bear" ("Ack, saliga stunder", lyrics by Carl Olof Rosenius), "Children of the Heavenly Father" ("Tryggare kan ingen vara", lyrics by Lina Sandell), and "All Hail to Thee, O Blessed Morn!" ("Var hälsad, sköna morgonstund", lyrics by Johan Olof Wallin) to English. He made important contributions to the Augustana Lutheran Church's hymnal, The Hymnal, and served on the committee to produce the Lutheran Service Book and Hymnal.

He married Anna Elizabeth Strand in 1899. After her death in 1924, he married Johanna Magnusson-Stock in 1930; she died in 1937. He married for a third time in 1940, to Hanna Morris Brown. Olson died in Chicago in 1958.

== Awards ==
- Honorary master's degree – Bethany College (1899)
- Doctor of Humane Letters – Augustana College (1926)
- Knight of the Order of Vasa (1948)

== Bibliography ==
- Bobby Beggum's birthday: and other stories and rhymes. Rock Island, Ill.: Augustana Book Concern. OCLC 16820592.
- A History of the Swedes of Illinois. Chicago. 1908. OCLC 950956780. (Two volumes)
- Min andra läsebok: fortsättning av Min första läsebok: nystavning med hänvisningar till det äldre stavsättet. Chicago: Engberg-Holmberg. 1910. OCLC 28301076.
- Charley Washington: studentkomedi (in Swedish). Pseudonym E Döbbelju. Rock Island, Ill. 1910. OCLC 923223243.
- En bokhandels historia (in Swedish). Chicago: Engberg-Holmberg. 1910. OCLC 15998481.
- Reformationskantat (in Swedish and English). With J Victor Bergquist. Rock Island, Ill. 1917. OCLC 269328688. (with music)
- The Swedish Element in Illinois. Chicago: Swedish-American Biographical Association. 1917. OCLC 6656848.
- Svensk diktning: selections from Swedish poets (in Swedish). With Jules Mauritzson. Augustana Book Concern. 1917. OCLC 81999399.
- Fiftieth anniversary, Augustana book concern, publishers to the Augustana synod since 1889: history of the synodical publication house, with introductory account of earlier publishing enterprises. Rock Island, Ill.: Augustana Book Concern. 1934. OCLC 936452368.
- Olof Olsson, the man, his work, and his thought. Rock Island, Ill.: Augustana Book Concern. 1941. OCLC 2144901.
- Valda dikter. Selected poems (in Swedish and English). Upsala, Nyblom & Hårshagen; Rock Island, Ill.: Augustana Book Concern. 1947. OCLC 2770854.
