= Den svenska psalmboken =

Den svenska psalmboken (The Swedish Hymnal) is the name of the official hymnal of the Church of Sweden. To date, there have been four official versions:

- Den svenska psalmboken (1695)
- Den svenska psalmboken (1819)
- Den svenska psalmboken (1937)
- Den svenska psalmboken (1986)
