= Din klara sol går åter opp =

Swedish Christian hymn

- Hymn by Johan Georg Christian Störl (possible composer)
- Occasion: morning
- Written: 1814
- Text: by Johan Olof Wallin
- Language: Swedish
- Melody: by Johan Georg Christian Störl?
- Published: 1819

Din klara sol går åter opp is a song with lyrics by Johan Olof Wallin, from 1814. Being a Christian morning hymn about Sunrise, it was a common morning prayer song in the Swedish primary school for decades. Johan Georg Christian Störl is often credited as composer of the tune.

The song has also been used as film soundtrack for the 1987 film "More About the Children of Noisy Village". The hymn is also sung during the school scenes in 1920 in the 2020 television series Mirakel.

In English, the hymn is called Again, Thy Glorious Sun Doth Rise.

== Publication ==
- 1819 års psalmbok as number 420 under the lines "Med avseende på särskilda personer, tider och omständigheter: Morgon och afton: Morgonpsalmer".
- Sjunga med oss, Mamma! 1, 1892, as "Morgonpsalm"
- Sionstoner 1889 as number 535.
- Metodistkyrkans psalmbok 1896 as number 41 under the lines "Morgon och afton".
- Svensk söndagsskolsångbok 1908 as number 265 under the lines "Morgon och afton".
- Svenska Missionsförbundets sångbok 1920 as number 671 under the lines "Morgon och afton".
- Svenska Frälsningsarméns sångbok 1922 as number 15 under the lines "Inledningssånger och psalmer ".
- Svensk söndagsskolsångbok 1929 as number 243 under the lines "Morgon och afton".
- Frälsningsarméns sångbok 1929 as number 544 under the lines "Högtider och särskilda tillfällen - Morgon och afton".
- Musik till Frälsningsarméns sångbok 1930 as number 544.
- Sionstoner 1935 as number 710 under the lines "Morgon och afton".
- 1937 års psalmbok as number 420 under the lines "Morgon".
- Psalmer för bruk vid krigsmakten 1961 as number 420 verserna 1-4.
- Frälsningsarméns sångbok 1968 as number 648 under the lines "Speciella Sånger - Morgon och afton".
- Den svenska psalmboken 1986 as number 176 under the lines "Morgon".
- Lova Herren 1988 as number 767 under the lines "Morgon".
