= Var hälsad, sköna morgonstund =

1819 Christmas hymn

- Hymn
- Occasion: Christmas
- Written: 1819
- Text: by Johan Olof Wallin
- Language: Swedish
- Based on: "Wie schön leuchtet der Morgenstern"
- Melody: by Philipp Nicolai
- Composed: 1599
- Published: 1819

Var hälsad, sköna morgonstund is an 1819 Christmas hymn with lyrics by Johan Olof Wallin. It is set to a tune composed by Philipp Nicolai. There is also an English language-version called "All Hail to Thee, O Blessèd Morn!" with lyrics by Ernst W. Olson published in the Augustana Hymnal of 1901.

== Publications ==
- 1819 års psalmbok as number 55 under the lines "Jesu kärleksfulla uppenbarelse i mänskligheten: Jesu födelse (julpsalmer)".
- Stockholms söndagsskolförenings sångbok 1882 as number 87 under the lines "Psalmer" with the verses 1 and 4.
- Sionstoner 1889 as number 446 under the lines "Psalmer", verses 1-4
- Herde-Rösten 1892 as number 94 under the lines "Jul-sånger".
- Svenska Missionsförbundets sångbok 1894 as number 32 under the lines "Jesu födelse".
- Hjärtesånger 1895 as number 46 entitled "Julsång"
- Musik till Frälsningsarméns sångbok 1907 as number 414
- Svensk söndagsskolsångbok 1908 as number 22 under the lines "Julsånger"
- Lilla Psalmisten 1909 as number 16 under the lines "Kristus: Hans födelse, död, uppståndelse."
- Svenska Frälsningsarméns sångbok 1922 as number 25 under the lines "Högtider, Jul".
- Svensk söndagsskolsångbok 1929 as number 37 under the lines "Advents- och julsånger"
- Frälsningsarméns sångbok 1929 as number 543 under the lines "Högtider och särskilda tillfällen - Jul".
- Svenska Missionsförbundets sångbok 1920 as number 82 under the lines "Jesu födelse"
- Segertoner 1930 as number 104
- Sionstoner 1935 as number 151 under the lines "Jul"
- 1937 års psalmbok as number 55 under the lines "Jul".
- Förbundstoner 1957 as number 43 under the lines "Guds uppenbarelse i Kristus: Jesu födelse".
- Segertoner 1960 as number 104
- Psalmer för bruk vid krigsmakten 1961 as number 55 verses 1–4.
- Frälsningsarméns sångbok 1968 as number 604 under the lines "Högtider - Jul".
- Sionstoner 1972 as number 109
- 1986 års psalmbok as number 119 in 1986 års Cecilia-psalmbok, Psalmer och Sånger 1987, Segertoner 1988 and Frälsningsarméns sångbok 1990 under the lines "Jul".
- Finlandssvenska psalmboken 1986 as number 27 under the lines "Jul".
- Lova Herren 1988 as number 100 under the lines "Jul".
- Julens önskesångbok, 1997, under the lines "Traditionella julsånger".
- Barnens svenska sångbok, 1999, under the lines "Året runt".
