= Jesus för världen givit sitt liv =

1889 Easter song with lyrics by Lina Sandell

- Hymn
- English: Jesus gave his life for the world
- Occasion: Easter
- Written: 1889
- Text: Lina Sandell
- Language: Swedish
- Melody: by Fredrik August Ekström
- Composed: 1860
- Published: 11892

Jesus för världen givit sitt liv is an 1889 Easter song with lyrics by Lina Sandell, and 1860 music by Fredrik August Ekström. According to Koralbok för Nya psalmer, 1921, the A tune is based on an English melody, and the B-tune a Fredrik August Ekström composition. The song was recorded by Carola Häggkvist in 1998 on the album "Blott en dag".

== Publication ==
- Hemlandssånger 1892 as number 66 under the lines "Högtiderna".
- Svensk söndagsskolsångbok 1908 as number 166 under the lines "Jesus efterföljelse".
- Samlingstoner 1919, as number 23 under the lines "Bönesånger".
- Nya psalmer 1921, tillägget till 1819 års psalmbok, as number 603 under the lines "Det kristliga troslivet: Troslivet hos den enskilda människan: De trognas helgelse och krisliga vandel: Den dagliga förnyelsen i Kristi efterföljelse".
- Svensk söndagsskolsångbok 1929 as number 66 under the lines "Jesu lidande".
- Sionstoner 1935 as number 192 under the lines "Passionstiden".
- Guds lov 1935 as number 77 under the lines "Passionssånger".
- 1937 års psalmbok as number 519 under the lines "Barn".
- Förbundstoner 1957 as number 107 under the lines "Guds uppenbarelse i Kristus: Jesu lidande och död".
- Segertoner 1960 as number 129.
- Psalmer för bruk vid krigsmakten 1961 as number 519 verserna 1-3.
- Kristus vandrar bland oss än 1965 as number 16.
- Frälsningsarméns sångbok 1968 as number 680 under the lines "Barn och ungdom".
- Sions Sånger 1981 as number 21 under the lines "Från Getsemane till Golgata".
- Cantarellen 1984 as number 54, verserna 1-3.
- 1986 års psalmbok as number 45 under the lines "Jesus, vår herre och broder".
- Lova Herren 1988 as number 51 under the lines "Frälsningen i Kristus".
