= Evangelisk Luthersk Mission – Bibeltrogna Vänner =

Church of Sweden mission organization

Evangelisk Luthersk Mission – Bibeltrogna Vänner (ELM) ('Evangelical Lutheran Mission – Bible Faithful Friends') is a Christian low-church mission organization part of the Church of Sweden, which is active in Sweden and abroad.

== Founding ==
ELM came from the Nyevangelism ('new evangelism') Swedish revival movement. It was founded as an independent organization in 1911 under the name Missionssällskapet Bibeltrogna Vänner (BV) by Axel B. Svensson, preacher at Bethlehem Church, Stockholm. The background to the formation of the ELM was a conflict over biblical views within the Swedish Evangelical Mission (Evangeliska Fosterlandsstiftelsen) between 1908 and 1911. The founders of the ELM criticized liberal-theological and biblical-critical tendencies within the organization. Recent research has nuanced the picture of the causes of the split. It has been argued that differing views of the Church of Sweden and aversion to central leadership were also contributing factors.

== Organization ==
The ELM is strongest in northern Scania, with around 2,840 members as of 2014 and 29 congregations as of 2019.

At the annual meeting on 18 June 2005, it was decided, in the context of a reorganization, to change to the current name from Missionssällskapet Bibeltrogna Vänner.

== Mission work ==
ELM has carried out mission work with posted missionaries in Kenya (from 1948), Ethiopia (from 1921), Eritrea (from 1921) and Peru (from 1994). As churches have grown in mission countries as a result of the work, ELM has fewer posted missionaries, but continues to work with independent Evangelical Lutheran churches in Kenya (Evangelical Lutheran Church of Kenya), Ethiopia (Ethiopian Evangelical Lutheran Church) and Eritrea (Evangelical Lutheran Church of Eritrea). In 2019 there are posted workers in Kenya and Peru.

In Sweden, the work is largely carried out by missionary societies with volunteer members who organize worship activities, children's and youth work and missionary activities.

== Theology ==
ELM believes that Evangelical Lutheran doctrine is a correct interpretation of the Word of God. Theologically, the ELM emphasizes the infallibility of the Bible, stating it is "the infallible word of God with absolute authority" and stands for a conservative, Pietist and Moravian-coloured Lutheranism. It has never broken away from the Church of Sweden but is a revival movement within the church: a "church within a church". The ELM tends to have a more critical attitude towards the Church of Sweden than, for example, the Swedish Evangelical Mission. Among other things, the national board has expressed criticism of the Church of Sweden's demand that candidates for the priesthood should cooperate fully with women priests. This demand has been opposed and it has also pointed out that "the office of preacher is reserved for men" with justification from the Bible. Criticism of the church has also increased after its approval of same-sex marriages. Characteristic of the society's activities is missionary commitment and the struggle for biblical faith in Sweden and internationally. The ELM carries out missionary work in Kenya, Ethiopia, Eritrea and Peru.

== Publications ==
ELM has its own publishing house, BV-Förlag, and has published the periodical Till Liv – evangelisk luthersk missionstidning (formerly Bibeltrogna Vänners Missionstidning) since 1911. It also publishes Luthersk Barntidning for its Sunday school and children's ministry work.

== Education ==
The movement also has its own Bible school at Strandhem in Örkelljunga Municipality. As of the autumn 2020 semester, Strandhem has worked with Johannelunds Teologiska Högskola in Uppsala to run Missionsakademin ('the Mission Academy').

== International cooperation ==
ELM works closely with a number of sister organizations in other countries, such as:

- Norwegian Lutheran Mission
- Evangelisk Luthersk Missionsforening, Denmark
- Svenska Lutherska Evangeliföreningen i Finland
- World Mission Prayer League
- Evangelical Lutheran Church of Kenya
