= Dalvik =

Dalvik may refer to:

== Places ==
- Dalvík, a village in Iceland
  - Dalvík/Reynir, a football club from Dalvík, Iceland
  - UMFS Dalvík, an Icelandic sports club in Dalvík, Iceland
- Dalvik, Jönköping, Jönköping, Sweden
  - Dalvik Church

== Software ==
- Dalvik (software), the discontinued virtual machine used in Android
- Dalvik Turbo virtual machine, an alternative to Google's implementation of the Dalvik virtual machine
