= Dalvik Church =

Coordinates: 57.7876°N 14.1333°E

- Dalvikskyrkan
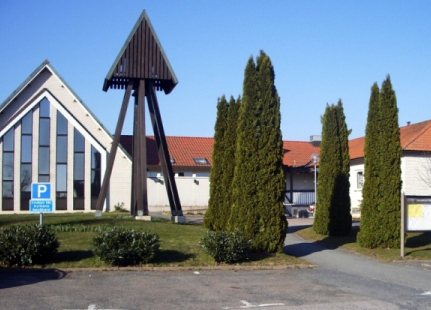
- The Dalvik Church in May 2008
- Dalvik Church
- Location: Dalvik
- Country: Sweden
- Denomination: Swedish Evangelical Mission

History
- Consecrated: 8 February 1969

Administration
- Diocese: Växjö
- Parish: Jönköping Sofia-Järstorp

The Dalvik Church (Swedish: Dalvikskyrkan) is a church building at Dalvik in Jönköping, Sweden. It is a Swedish Evangelical Mission church belonging to the Jönköping Sofia-Järstorp Parish of the Church of Sweden, it was inaugurated on 8 February 1969 and expanded in 1985.

Near the Dalvik Church is the "Kyrktuppen Kindergarten", ran by the Church of Sweden.

== August 2020 fire ==
On the night before 1 August 2020, a fire erupted in the kitchen in the basement, and damaged the building. The fire was extinguished before it spread to other parts of the church. The Kindergarten activity could re-start.
