= Thy Holy Wings =

- Christian hymn
- Native name: Bred dina vida vingar
- Genre: Hymn
- Occasion: Evening
- Text: Lina Sandell
- Language: Swedish

"Thy Holy Wings" (originally "Bred dina vida vingar" literally "Spread your wide wings") is a Swedish metrical psalm setting with lyrics by Lina Sandell in 1860 and reworked in 1865 to a Danish or Swedish folk melody.
