= Rasmus Troedsson =

Swedish actor, writer and journalist

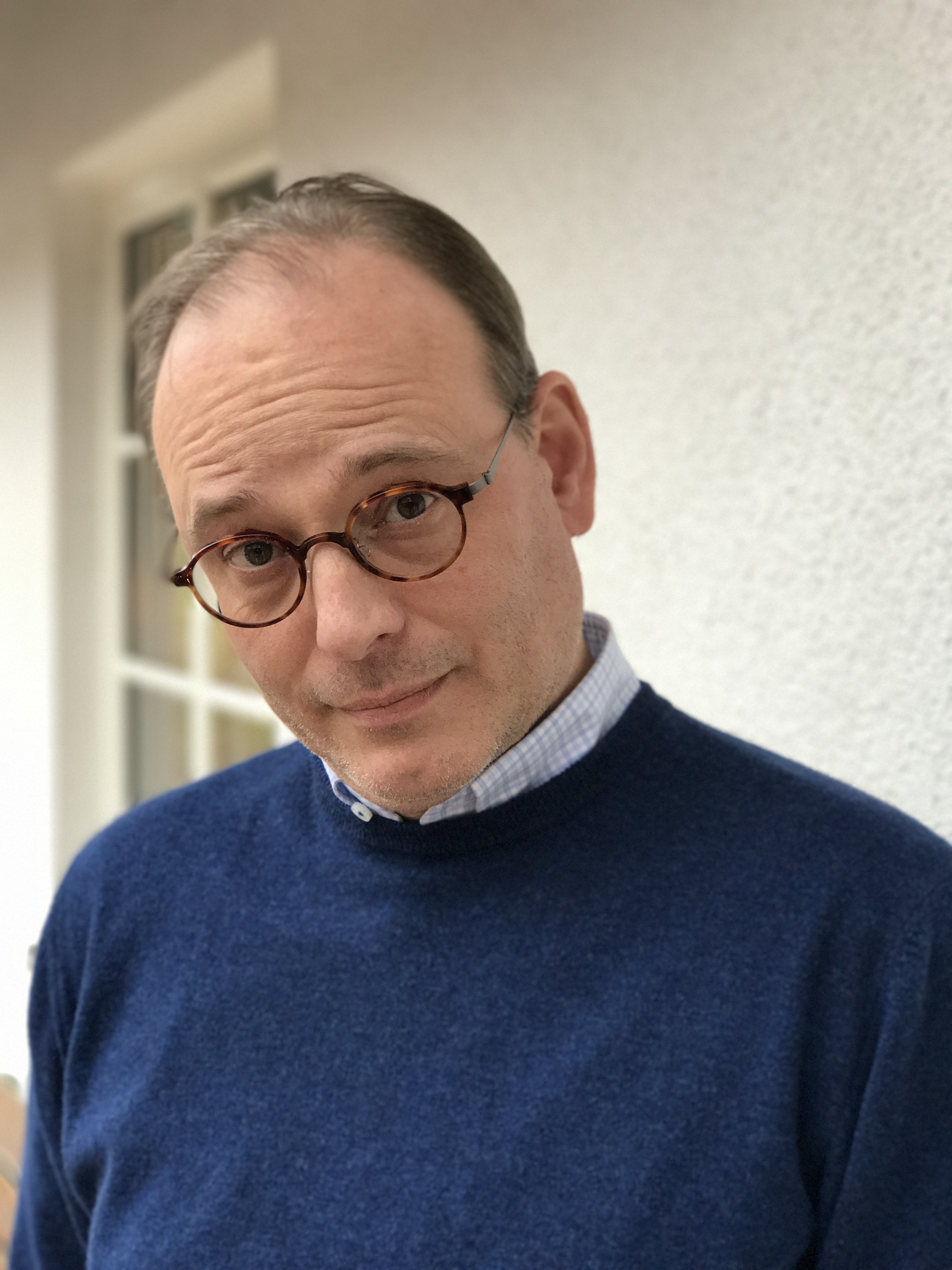
- Born: 9 January 1964 (age 62); Malmö, Sweden
- Occupations: Actor, journalist, writer

Bengt Rasmus Mikael Troedsson, (born 9 January 1964) is a Swedish actor, writer and journalist. He has worked for SVT, TV4, and Sveriges Radio. As an actor he is best known for his role as Bellan Roos in Vår tid är nu which is broadcast on SVT, he has also had roles in The Bridge, Beyond and Mirakel. In 2020, he presented an episode of Sommar i P1 on Sveriges Radio where he told about his life and career.

== Filmography ==
- 1995 – Mördande intelligens
- 1999 – Offer och gärningsmän (TV-series)
- 1999 – Dödsklockan
- 2000 – Soldater i månsken (TV-series)
- 2004 – Graven (TV-series)
- 2005 – Lasermannen (TV-series)
- 2006 – Beck – Skarpt läge
- 2006 – Inga tårar
- 2007 – Upp till kamp (TV-series)
- 2008 – Andra avenyn (TV-series)
- 2009 – De halvt dolda (TV-series)
- 2010 – Wallander – Vålnaden
- 2010 – För kärleken
- 2010 – Starke man (TV-series)
- 2010 – Himlen är oskyldigt blå
- 2010 – Svinalängorna
- 2011 – Gränsen
- 2011 – Soffan
- 2011 – Maria Wern - Svart fjäril
- 2011 – The Bridge (TV-series)
- 2011 – Anno 1790 (TV-series)
- 2012 – Studio Sex
- 2012 – Call Girl
- 2014 – Gentlemen
- 2015 – John Hron
- 2017–2019 – Vår tid är nu (TV-series)
- 2020 – Mirakel (TV-series)

== Bibliography ==
- Troedsson, Rasmus; Hultgren Mats (1987). Det stinker i salongen. ISBN 91-7810-866-7
- Troedsson, Rasmus; Pohl Kristian (1988). Jag skall frälsa världen. ISBN 91-971082-1-9
