= Ruth Forsling =

Swedish activist and politician (1923–1985)

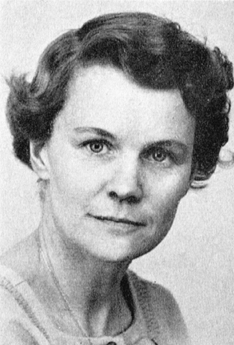

Member of the Stockholm County Council
- In office 1970–1985

Member of the Riksdag for Stockholm Municipality
- In office 1964

Member of the Stockholm City Council
- In office 1960–1970
- In office 1950–1954

Personal details
- Born: Ruth Linnéa Larsson; 11 February 1923 Rättvik, Sweden
- Died: 3 May 1985 (aged 62) Stockholm, Sweden
- Party: Liberal People's Party
- Spouse: Erik Wilhelm Forsling (m. 1948)
- Children: 4

Ruth Linnéa Forsling (née Larsson; 11 February 1923 – 3 May 1985) was a Swedish teacher, liberal activist, and politician who served in the Parliament of Sweden in 1964. A member of the Liberal People's Party, she represented the Stockholm Municipality constituency. Forsling was also a member of the Stockholm City Council from 1950 until 1954 and from 1960 until 1970.

== Biography ==
Ruth Linnéa Larsson was born on 11 February 1923 in the town of Rättvik, Sweden, to painter Hans Larsson and Anna Ivarez. She graduated secondary school in 1943, and became a primary school teacher in Stockholm three years later; she would eventually teach at Adolf Fredrik's Music School. In 1948, she married professor Erik Wilhelm Forsling; the couple would have four children.

Throughout the 1950s, Forsling rose in prominence as a prominent liberal activist, becoming a member of the Association of Liberal Citizens and the Liberal People's Party, as well as leading several women's groups. She was also active in a Christian revival movement, promoting liberal Christianity as a member of the Swedish Evangelical Mission. Forsling served on the Stockholm City Council from 1950 until 1954 and from 1960 until 1970. During her tenure, she sat on several prominent committees, including the committees on childcare, youth, and education. Forsling also served as the federal representative for the Municipal Association for Stockholm City and County Regional Affairs, and was a member of the board of AB Familjebostäder, a public housing company.

For six months in 1964, Forsling served as a substitute member of the Riksdag, representing Stockholm Municipality. While in parliament, Forsling was an advocate for racial color blindness, stating that in an ideal future, "we would completely seek to eliminate these signs of different origins and group affiliations". In the 1964 Swedish general election, Forsling ran for a permanent seat in parliament, but was narrowly defeated; however, her candidacy is credited with having prevented a far-right candidate from winning, as the two split the Christian vote. In 1970, she was elected to the Stockholm County Council, serving until her death in Stockholm on 3 May 1985.

In 1971, Forsling was awarded the St. Erik's Medal by the Stockholm City Council.
