= Svenska Amerikanaren Tribunen =

Swedish-American newspaper

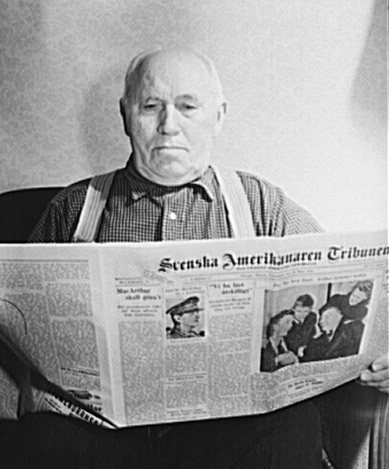
- A Swedish-American in Minnesota reading the news, April 1942.
- Type: Weekly newspaper
- Founded: 1936
- Ceased publication: 1985
- Language: Swedish
- Headquarters: Chicago, Illinois, United States
- ISSN: 0888-2045

Svenska Amerikanaren Tribunen was a Swedish-American weekly newspaper which was published in Chicago and read by Swedish immigrants.

Two competing newspapers have held the name Svenska Amerikanaren, both with roots in the 1870s, but the two newspapers merged in 1936 under the title Svenska Amerikanaren Tribunen (ISSN 0888-2045). The issues through 1966 have been microfilmed.

During the large-scale emigration from Sweden to North America in the late 19th century, many of the immigrants did not immediately learn English. Many settled in the Midwest, and in the big city of Chicago there was a market for Swedish-language newspapers and books.

The first Svenske Amerikanaren was published in Chicago from 1866 to 1873 and later changed its name to Nya Svenska Amerikanaren from 1873 to 1877. The newspaper's first editor-in-chief was Colonel Hans Mattson (1832–1893). The bilingual The Illinois Swede was started in 1869 but changed its name the year after to Nya Verlden and was published from 1870 to 1877. The two newspapers were merged and renamed Svenska Tribunen from 1877 to 1906. Tribunen was liberal, and a leading news publication. Its editors were:

- 1876–1884: Carl Fredrik Peterson
- 1884–1890: Carl Gustaf Linderborg (1844–1901)
- 1893–1900: Anders Leonard Gyllenhaal (1842–1905)
- 1900–1905: Ernst W. Olson (1870–1958)

A third newspaper, Svenska Nyheter, was published from 1901 to 1906 and then merged with Svenska Tribunen under the title Svenska Tribunen-Nyheter from 1906 to 1936. Its editors were C. F. Erikson from 1905 to 1913 and A. Tofft after 1913. It comprised 16 pages in seven columns and had distribution of 70,000 copies (1915). The newspaper's politics leaned towards the Republican Party.

However, the Chicago newspaper which became most well-known under the name was first published in 1876 under the title Svenska Posten. It took over the available title Svenska Amerikanaren for the years from 1877 to 1936 after the previous owners had not properly kept the rights to the name. The paper was radical and anti-church from the start, but became more restrained in the 1880s. Its sympathies were with the Republican Party, even though the newspaper was officially politically independent. Its editors were Magnus Elmblad from 1877 to 1884, Carl Fredrik Peterson from 1884 to 1888, Jakob Bonggren (1854–1940) from 1888 to 1908 and Oliver A. Linder from 1908. After the merger with Gamla och Nya Hemlandet, the title was Svenska Amerikanaren Hemlandet from the fall of 1914 through the end of 1915 before returning to the name Svenska Amerikanaren. The newspaper consisted of 16 pages and had a distribution of 75,000 copies (1915). In 1940 the newspaper merged with Svenska Amerikanska Posten. The last issue was published 18 December 1985.

A newspaper with the title Svenska Amerikanska Tribunen was published from 1904 to 1920 in Superior, Wisconsin. A newspaper with the title Svenska Tribunen was published from 1922 to 1946 in Seattle, Washington. Other newspapers with the title Nya Verlden were published 1873–1874 in Gothenburg and from 1889 to 1893 in Minneapolis.
