= Low church =

Christian denominations without much ritual

In Anglican Christianity, the term low church refers to those who place less emphasis on liturgy and ritual, and a greater emphasis on preaching, individual salvation, and personal conversion. The term is most often used to denote a more Protestant emphasis. By contrast, the term high church denotes a greater emphasis on ritual, and may signify Anglo-Catholicism.

The term was initially pejorative. During the series of doctrinal and ecclesiastic challenges to the established church in the 17th century, commentators and others – who favoured the theology, worship, and hierarchical structure of Anglicanism (such as the episcopate) as the true form of Christianity – began referring to that outlook (and the related practices) as high church, and by the early 18th century those theologians and politicians who sought more reform in the English church and a greater liberalisation of church structure were in contrast called low church.

To an outsider, the difference between high church and low church may not be immediately obvious. There is a strong tradition of spiritual flexibility in Anglicanism, and many churches do not wish to exclude those who prefer one or the other. Most local churches do not identify as one or the other, and may try to accommodate many forms of worship. Churches that are more lax in ritual generally do not advertise as such, and the vast majority of Anglican churches, including most low church congregations, follow some kind of fixed liturgy. Low-church congregations, however, typically have plainer-looking churches, prefer modern language, have some aspects of contemporary worship, and include more roles for laypersons during service. One definite indicator of a low-church parish is infrequent services for performing sacraments such as the Eucharist. Many low-church parishes are strongly influenced by evangelicalism and individual religious experience, resulting in a tradition called Evangelical Anglicanism.

== Historical use ==
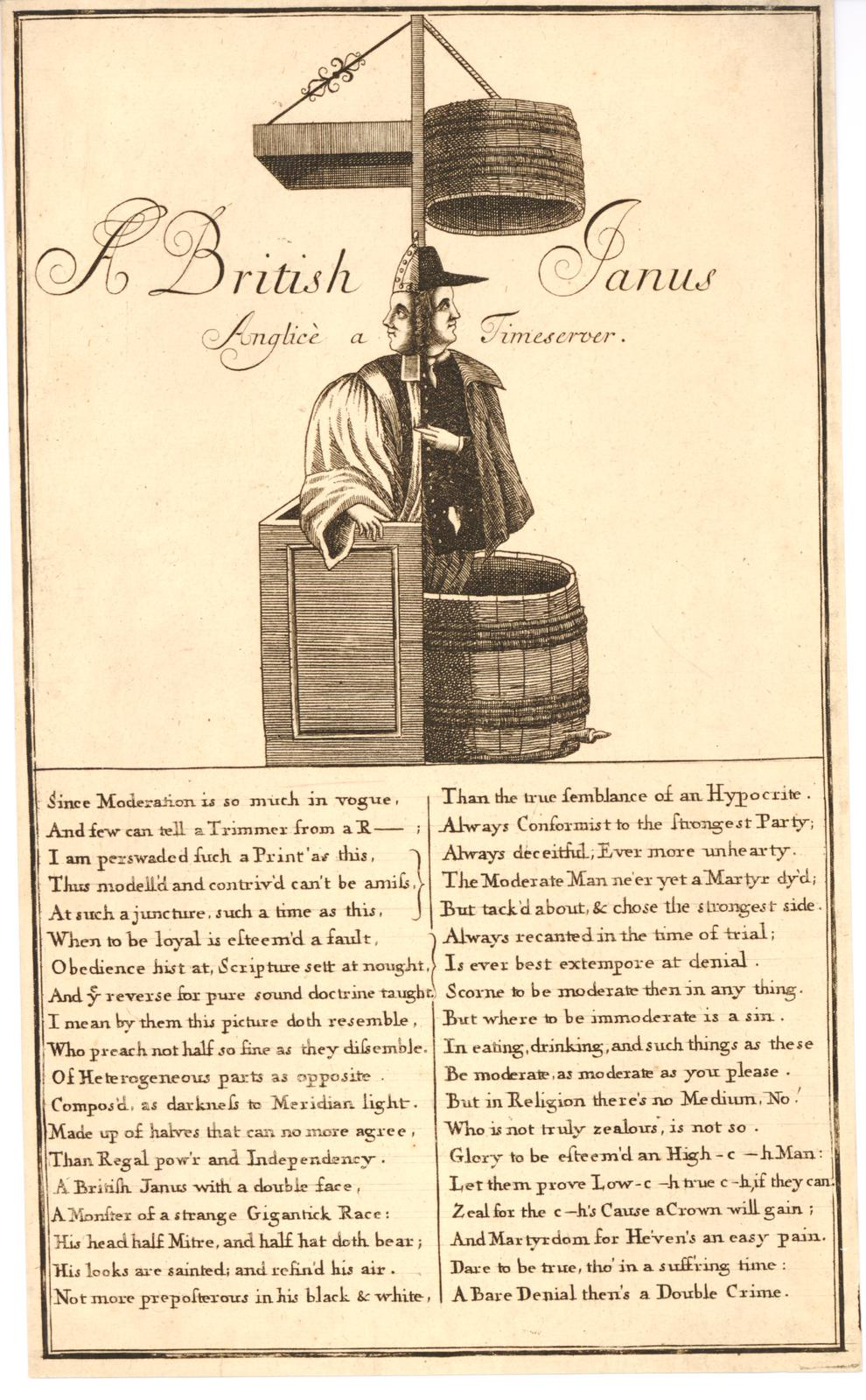
1709 satirical broadside with an engraving showing a Janus figure preaching, the left half showing a bishop in a pulpit, the right half a puritan in a tub

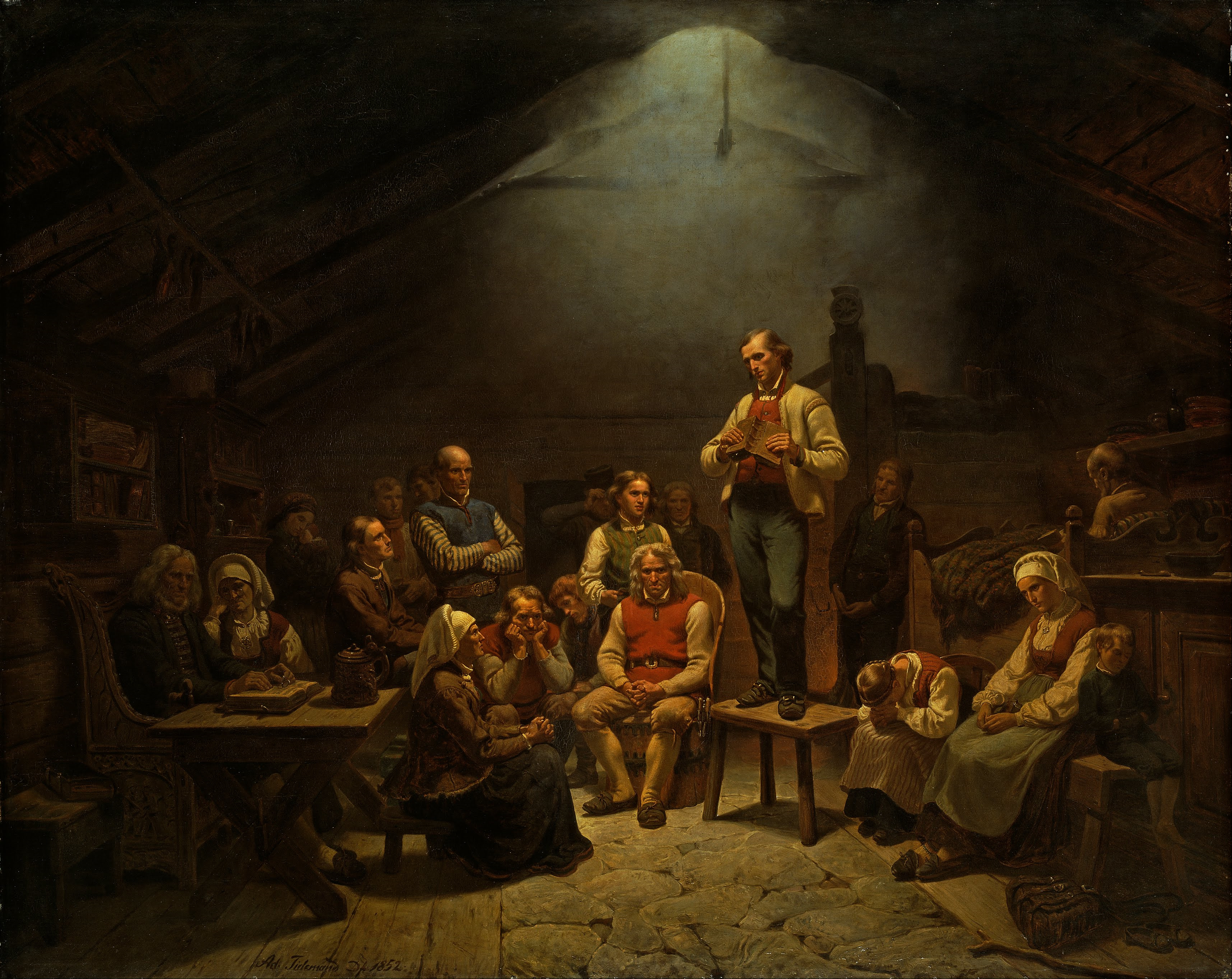
"Low Church Devotion" (Adolph Tidemand, 1852)

The term low church was used in the early part of the 18th century as the equivalent of the term Latitudinarian in that it was used to refer to values that provided much latitude in matters of discipline and faith. The term was in contradistinction to the term high church, or high churchmen, which applied to those who valued the exclusive authority of the Established Church, the episcopacy and the sacramental system.

Low churchmen wished to tolerate Puritan opinions within the Church of England, though they might not be in agreement with Puritan liturgical practices. The movement to bring Separatists, and in particular Presbyterians, back into the Church of England ended with the Act of Toleration 1689 for the most part. Though Low church continued to be used for those clergy holding a more liberal view of Dissenters, the term eventually fell into disuse.

Both terms were revived in the 19th century when the Tractarian movement brought the term "high churchman" into vogue. The terms were again used in a modified sense, now used to refer to those who exalted the idea of the Church as a catholic entity as the body of Christ, and the sacramental system as the divinely given means of grace. A low churchman now became the equivalent of an evangelical Anglican, the designation of the movement associated with the name of Charles Simeon, which held the necessity of personal conversion to be of primary importance.

At the same time, Latitudinarian changed to broad church, or broad churchmen, designating those who most valued the ethical teachings of the Church and minimised the value of orthodoxy. The revival of pre-Reformation ritual by many of the high church clergy led to the designation ritualist being applied to them in a somewhat contemptuous sense. However, the terms high churchman and ritualist have often been wrongly treated as interchangeable. The high churchman of the Catholic type is further differentiated from the earlier use of what is sometimes described as the "high and dry type" of the period before the Oxford Movement.

== Modern use ==
In contemporary usage, "low churches" place more emphasis on the Reformed Protestant nature of Anglicanism than broad or high churches and are usually Evangelical in their belief and conservative (although not necessarily traditional) in practice. They may tend to favour liturgy such as the Common Worship over Book of Common Prayer, services of Morning and Evening Prayer over the Eucharist, and many use the minimum of formal liturgy permitted by church law. The Diocese of Sydney has largely abandoned the Prayer Book and uses free-form evangelical services.

Some contemporary low churches also incorporate elements of charismatic Christianity.

More traditional low church Anglicans, under the influence of Calvinist or Reformed thought inherited from the Reformation era, reject the doctrine that the sacraments confer grace ex opere operato (e.g., baptismal regeneration) and lay stress on the Bible as the ultimate source of authority in matters of faith necessary for salvation. They are often prepared to cooperate with other Protestants on nearly equal terms. Some low church Anglicans of the Reformed party consider themselves the only faithful adherents of historic Anglicanism and emphasise the Thirty-Nine Articles of the Church of England as an official doctrinal statement of the Anglican tradition.

== Ecumenical relationships ==
=== United churches with other Protestants in Asia ===
Several provinces of the Anglican Communion in Asia have merged with other Protestant churches. The Church of South India arose out of a merger of the southern province of the Church of India, Pakistan, Burma and Ceylon (Anglican), the Methodist Church of South India and the South India United Church (a Congregationalist, Reformed and Presbyterian united church) in 1947. In the 1990s a small number of Baptist and Pentecostal churches joined also the union.

In 1970 the Church of India, Pakistan, Burma and Ceylon, the United Church of North India, the Baptist Churches of Northern India, the Church of the Brethren in India, the Methodist Church (British and Australia Conferences) and the Disciples of Christ denominations merged to form the Church of North India. Also in 1970 the Anglican, Presbyterian (Church of Scotland), United Methodist and Lutheran Churches in Pakistan merged into the Church of Pakistan. The Church of Bangladesh is the result of a merger of Anglican and Presbyterian churches.

=== Great Britain and Ireland ===
In the 1960s the Methodist Church of Great Britain made ecumenical overtures to the Church of England, aimed at church unity. These formally failed when they were rejected by the Church of England's General Synod in 1972. In 1981, a covenant project was proposed between the Church of England, the Methodist Church in Great Britain, the United Reformed Church and the Moravian Church.

In 1982 the United Reformed Church voted in favour of the covenant, which would have meant remodelling its elders and moderators as bishops and incorporating its ministry into the apostolic succession. The Church of England rejected the covenant. Conversations and co-operation continued leading in 2003 to the signing of a covenant between the Church of England and the Methodist Church of Great Britain. From the 1970s onward, the Methodist Church was involved in several "Local Ecumenical Projects" (LEPs) with neighbouring denominations usually with the Church of England, the Baptists or with the United Reformed Church, which involved sharing churches, schools and in some cases ministers.

In the Church of England, Anglicans of Anglo-Catholic churchmanship are often opposed to unity with other Protestants, which can reduce hope of unity with the Roman Catholic Church. Accepting women Protestant ministers would also make unity with the See of Rome more difficult.

In the 1990s and early 2000s the Scottish Episcopal Church (Anglican), the Church of Scotland (Presbyterian), the Methodist Church of Great Britain and the United Reformed Church were all parts of the "Scottish Churches Initiative for Union" (SCIFU) for seeking greater unity. The attempt stalled following the withdrawal of the Church of Scotland in 2003.

In 2002 the Church of Ireland, which is generally on the low church end of the spectrum of world Anglicanism, signed a covenant for greater cooperation and potential ultimate unity with the Methodist Church in Ireland.

== Lutheranism ==
=== Sweden ===
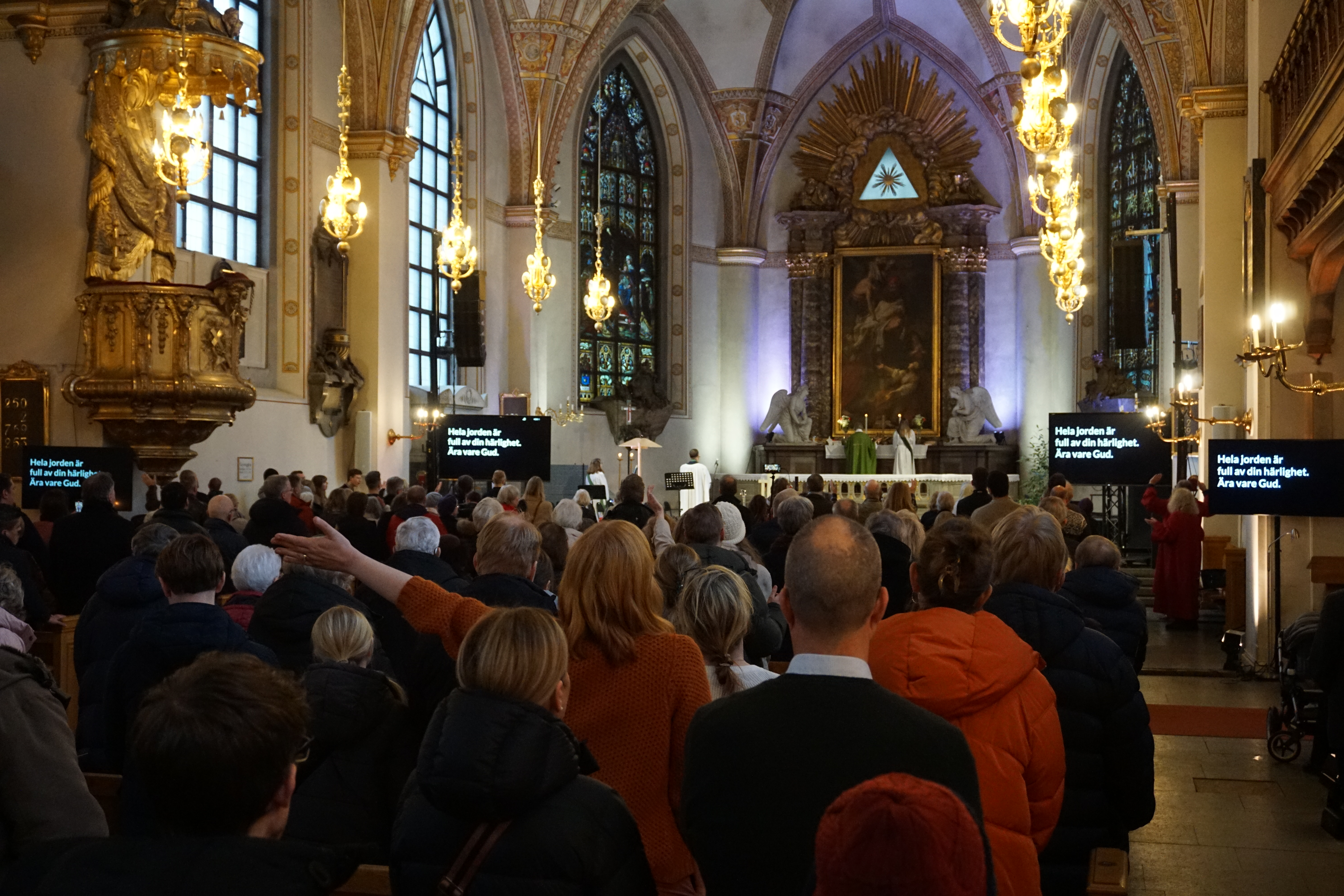
A contemporary Low church Lutheran mass within the Swedish Evangelical Mission in Klara Church in Stockholm. Electronical screens, contemporary music and praise bands, lay preachers, and a more unreserved body language is much more common in low church contexts than in the rest of the Church of Sweden.

In the mid-to-late 1800s under influence from the third great awakening in the anglosphere and earlier moravian and pietist influence from Continental Europe, the modern low church movement emerged in the Church of Sweden which in general has been placed in the high church end of the Lutheran spectrum historically. After the Dissenter Acts were passed many new independent denominations known as free churches were formed. At the same time efforts had been made to combine these influences with the Lutheran confessions and continued loyalty to the Lutheran state church (henceforth known as the Church of Sweden), which resulted in the formation of the still existent Swedish Evangelical Mission in 1856, an independent association within the Church of Sweden. Eventually, in 1878, it split when the majority left to form the Swedish Mission Covenant under the leadership of the priest Paul Petter Waldenström, an independent denomination which in modern times merged to form the Uniting Church in Sweden and is the ancestor to some denominations brought to North America by swedish emigrants, for example the Evangelical Covenant Church and the Evangelical free Church of America. The state church-loyal Swedish Evangelical Mission had a more conservative offshoot called Evangelical Lutheran Mission - Bible faithful friends in 1911, which is smaller and also still existent.

Around the same time Laestadianism emerged in Northern Sweden and spread throughout the Nordic Countries, especially around the North Calotte and into Finland where the vast majority of today's laestadians can be found. It is a very austere low church movement within Lutheranism which is extremely conservative. By emigration it eventually spread to North America and the USA in particular.

== See also ==
- Anglo-Catholicism
- Broad church
- Central churchmanship
- Conservative Evangelicalism in Britain
- Church of England
- Church of England (Continuing)
- Evangelical Anglicanism
- High Church
- Open Evangelical
- Provincial episcopal visitor
- Ritualism
