= Mirakel =

2020 Swedish television Advent calendar

- Country of origin: Sweden
- Original language: Swedish

Original release
- Network: SVT
- Release: 1 December – 24 December 2020

Related
- Panik i tomteverkstan (2019); En hederlig jul med Knyckertz (2021)

Mirakel (Miracle) was the 2020 Sveriges Television's Christmas Calendar. It started airing on 1 December 2020, and ended on 24 December the same year.

== Plot ==
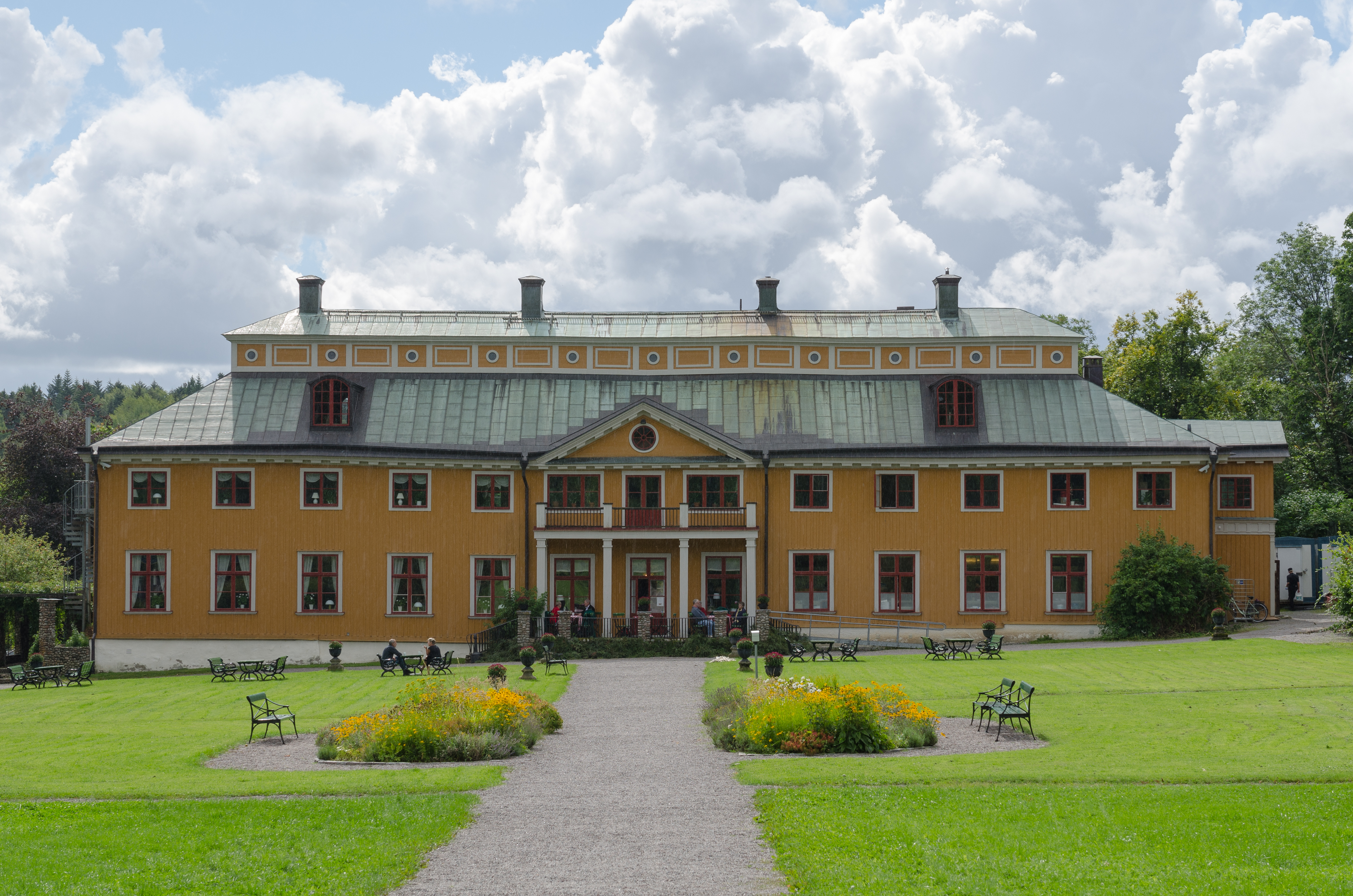
Ekebyhov Castle, where the mansion scenes were filmed.

In a laboratory in Sweden before Christmas 2020, the scientists Anna-Carin Davidsson-Colt and Vilgot develop an artificial black hole to be used as an energy source. The black hole is accidentally released and ends up in the attic of an residential care home for children where the orphan Mira lives. Mira is soon to be adopted, but does not want to be separated from her friend Galad.

Exactly 100 years earlier (in 1920) and in the same building, then a mansion, the upper-class girl Rakel Colt is getting ready to be photographed with her family. Mira and Rakel both stumble upon the black hole and are involuntarily pulled in by it, switching bodies and time periods.

To raise awareness of global warming, Christmas of 1920 is depicted as snowy while in 2020, there is no snow on the ground.

== Roles ==
- Sarah Rhodin – Mira
- Bibi Lenhoff – Rakel
- Emanuel Kielin – Galad
- Johan Glans – Vilgot
- Babben Larsson – Agneta
- Annika Andersson – Anna-Carin
- Maja Rung – Märta
- Emil Brulin – Ivar
- Andreas Rothlin Svensson – Gustaf
- Oscar Bergman – Einar
- Ossian Nordh – Sören 1920
- Elvira Tröger – maid Sara
- Joel Adolphson – Ernst
- Sten Ljunggren – Storyteller/Sören 2020
- Therese Lindgren – Greta
- Dragomir Mrsic – Andrés
- Marika Carlsson – Schoolteacher 2020
- Jonathan Blode – Schoolteacher 1920
- Rasmus Troedsson – Dr. Bjelke
- Per Svensson – photographer Ahlsten
- Molly – Lady the dog

== Music ==
- Gläns över sjö och strand (Chapter 1)
- Din klara sol går åter opp (Chapter 12)
- Ute är mörkt och kallt (Chapter 13)
- Nu tändas tusen juleljus (Chapter 21)
- När det lider mot jul (Chapter 21)
