= Johan Olof Wallin =

Swedish poet and clergyman

The Most Reverend Johan Olof Wallin
- Archbishop of Uppsala; Primate of Sweden
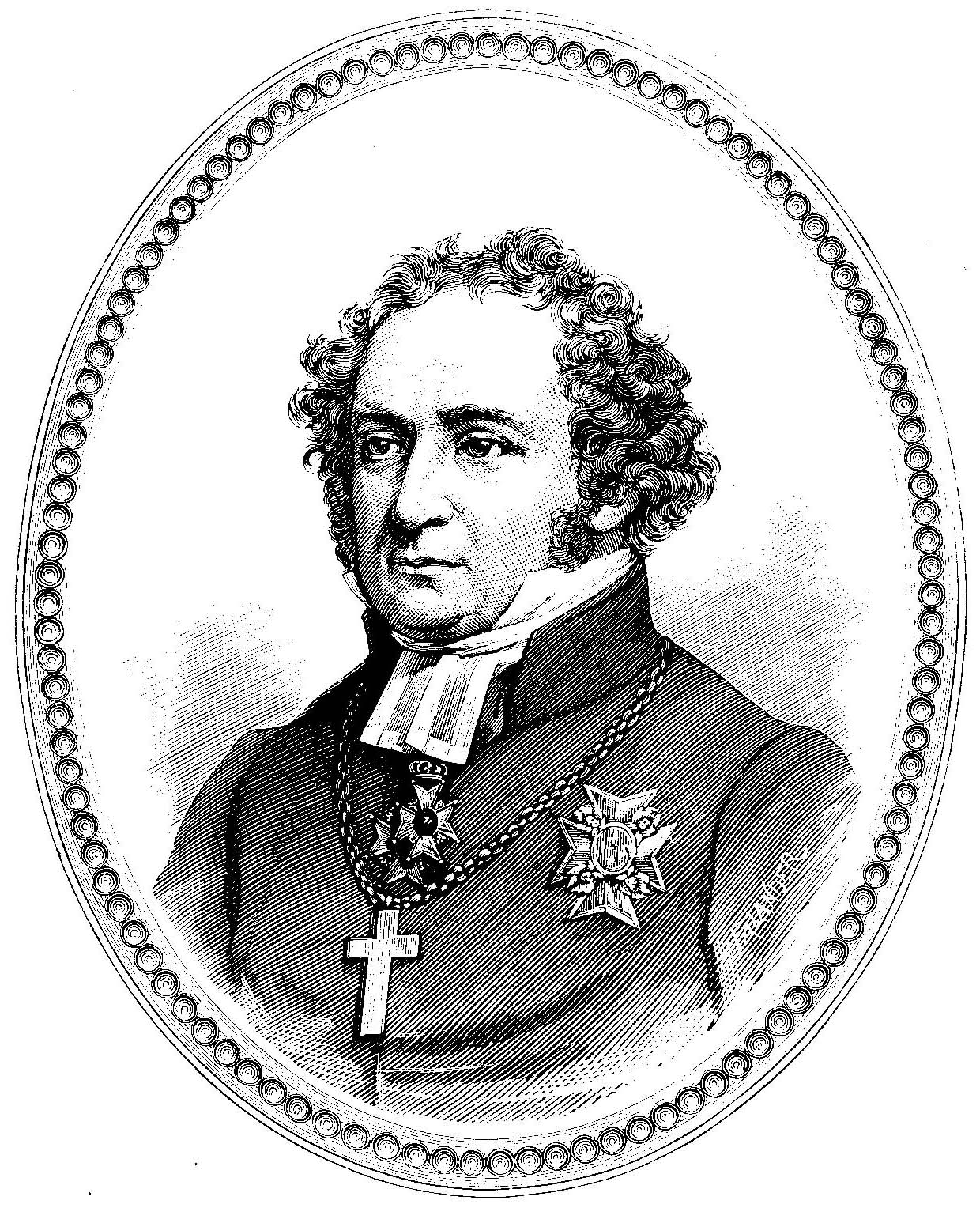
- Native name: (English later Walleen)
- Church: Church of Sweden
- Archdiocese: Uppsala
- Appointed: 1837
- In office: 1837–1839
- Predecessor: Carl von Rosenstein
- Successor: Carl Fredrik af Wingård

Orders
- Consecration: 28 March 1824 by Carl von Rosenstein
- Rank: Metropolitan Archbishop

Personal details
- Born: 15 October 1779 Stora Tuna, Dalarna, Sweden
- Died: 30 June 1839 (aged 59) Uppsala, Sweden
- Spouse: Anna Maria Dimander (1810-1839)
- Education: University of Uppsala

Johan Olof Wallin (15 October 1779 – 30 June 1839) was a Swedish minister, orator, poet and later Church of Sweden Archbishop of Uppsala, Sweden between 1837 and 1839. He is most remembered today for his hymns.

== Early life ==
He was born in Stora Tuna in Dalarna (now part of Borlänge Municipality, Dalarna County) as the oldest son in a large family, and went to school in Falun. His parents did not have much money, but because he was a bright student he managed to enroll at the University of Uppsala in 1799. Four years later he obtained his Master of Arts, and after another three years he was ordained minister.

While he was studying, his first poem was published in Upsala tidningar (1802). In the following years, he wrote and translated several other poetic works, and received several awards from the Swedish Academy for his work. Among his awarded works were translations of Horace and Virgil; and for a song about Gustav III he was awarded the high sum of 200 ducats. His poetry was, however, by some considered too rhetorical and out-dated compared to the then flourishing Romantic poets. Wallin took the criticism to heart, and adapted to the new style which was more emotional and less influenced by the Latin poets.

== Clerical work ==
In 1810 he married Anna Maria Dimander. In the same year, he was elected to the Swedish Academy. In addition to this, he took it upon himself to commission the creation of a new Swedish book of hymns. The project was finished in 1816. It was approved by the king in 1819, and printed the same year. Of the 500 hymns, Wallin had written 128, translated 23, and involved himself in the revision of another 178. Additionally the structure or arrangement of the hymnal was mainly his creation.

In 1827, he was elected a member of the Royal Swedish Academy of Sciences. In 1835, Wallin founded the Swedish Mission Society (Svenska Missionssällskapet), an organization for missions work among the Sámi people, together with Scottish Methodist missionary George Scott, industrialist Samuel Owen, Count Mathias Rosenblad, bishop Carl Fredrik af Wingård, and others.

He held many different clerical posts throughout his life. Ultimately he was ordained Archbishop of Sweden in 1837. But before he had even moved to Uppsala (seat of the bishopric), he died a sudden death in 1839, and was buried in Stockholm. The Swedish Biographical Dictionary of 1906 indicates that he at his death was "mourned by the entire Swedish people". The Swedish Literature in Summary (1904) writes that no Swedish orator or preacher ever had his distinctive glow as a speaker.

He was undoubtedly a talented person in literature and a most pious man. But he was weak in body, and this trait in combination with his strong work ethic may have caused stress on his health.

== Educational work ==
Wallin was the instigator of the progressive pioneering girls' school Wallinska skolan, the fourth serious educational girls' school in Sweden and the first in the capital of Stockholm, an initiative he convinced Anders Fryxell to take motivated by his view that women should be entitled to more serious education than given in a finishing school.

He was also president of Pro Fide et Christianismo, a Christian education society which made an impact on the country's early public education system.

== Legacy ==
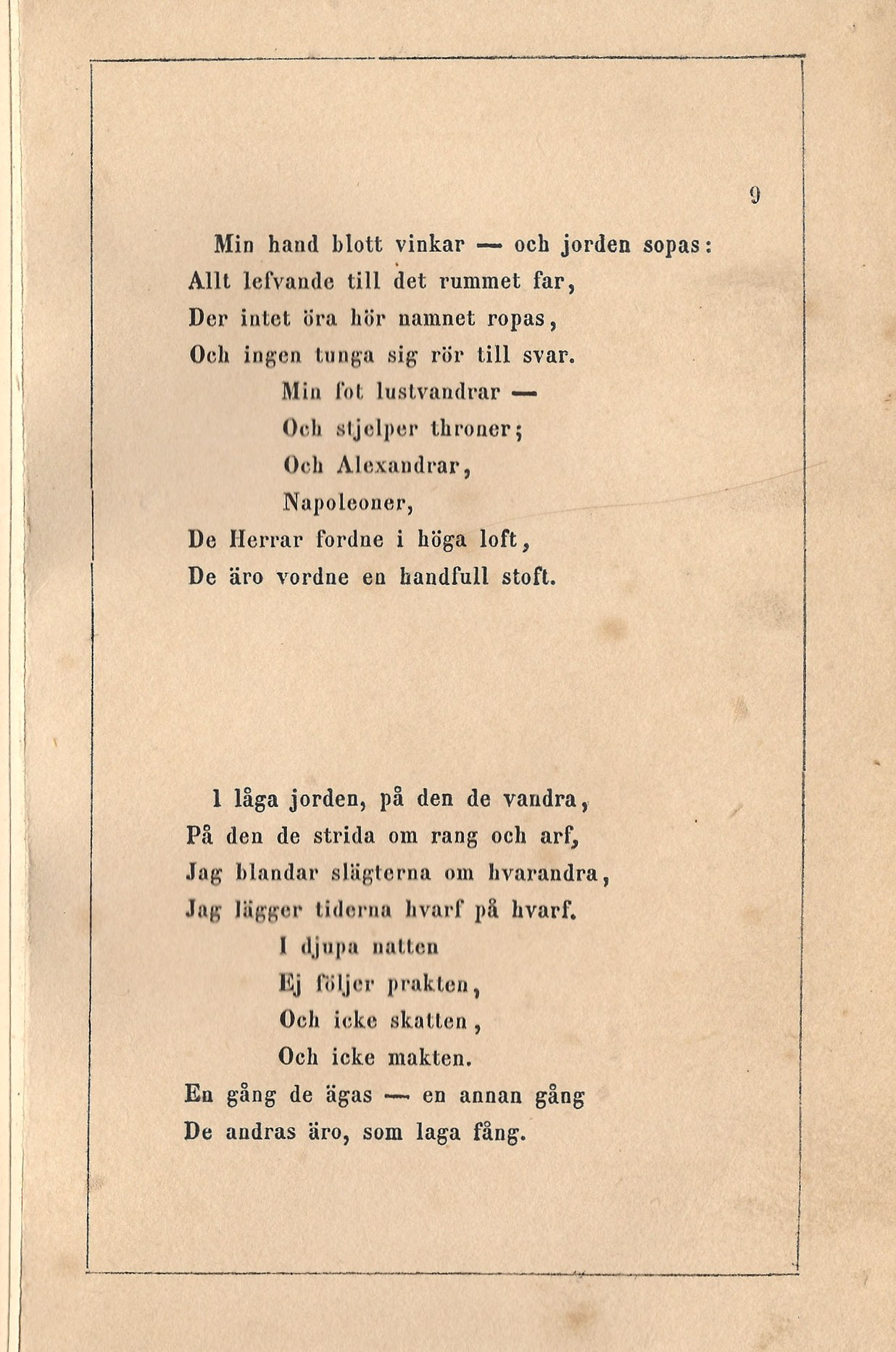
From the religious poem Dödens ängel of Johan Olof Wallin, 1851

During the remainder of the 19th century he was highly beloved and praised by writers and intellectuals in Sweden. In some places his 100th anniversary was celebrated in 1879. A monument of him was also erected in his hometown, and a bust of him was unveiled in Falun in 1917. During the 20th century, the harsh Lutheranism associated with Wallin was increasingly scorned in Sweden as being oppressive and guilt-stricken, and this trend in combination with increased secularization has diminished his reputation; today he is remembered for merely those hymns still in use in Swedish churches, the traditional Christmas hymn "Var hälsad, sköna morgonstund" among them.

Besides hymns, Wallin wrote several secular poems highly praised in his time. He published several sermons and speeches. Of his hymns still in use in Swedish hymnbooks today, a few have also been translated into English and published in hymnals such as the Lutheran Book of Worship. These include – besides "Var hälsad, sköna morgonstund" ("All Hail to you, O blessed morn", translated to English by Ernst Olson) – "Du som fromma hjärtan vårdar" ("Christians, while on Earth abiding") and "Vi lovar Dig, O Store Gud" ("We worship you, O God of might"), as well as "Din klara sol går åter opp" as "Again, Thy Glorious Sun Doth Rise".

His style is described as melancholic but ravishing, often dealing with death, with frequent references and quotes from the Bible. His grand work was the long poem Angel of Death, finished only about year before his death. Compared to Swedish poets contemporary with Wallin, some consider him second only to Esaias Tegnér.

== Notes ==
Religious titles
Preceded by Carl von Rosenstein	Archbishop of Uppsala; 1837–1839	Succeeded by Carl Fredrik af Wingård
Cultural offices
Preceded by Nils Philip Gyldenstolpe	Swedish Academy, Seat No 1; 1810–1839	Succeeded by Anders Fryxell
