= Johannelunds Teologiska Högskola =

Swedish university college

Johannelund School of Theology
- Johannelunds teologiska högskola
- Type: university college / theological seminary
- Established: 1862; 164 years ago
- Religious affiliation: Lutheran
- President: Docent James Starr (2018)
- Students: 200
- Location: Uppsala, Sweden; 59°52′42.92″N 17°38′50.87″E
- Operated by: Swedish Evangelical Mission
- Website: www.johannelund.nu

Johannelunds teologiska högskola or Johannelund School of Theology is a university college in Sweden. It is an independent college/theological seminary, founded in 1862 (164 years ago) and located in Uppsala, Sweden. In addition to offering a three-year bachelor's degree in theology, the seminary offers a one or two-year master's degree in theology. Today there are circa 200 students at Johannelund, most of whom are preparing for ministry in either the Swedish Evangelical Mission or the Church of Sweden. In addition, there is a Bible school located on campus offering a one-year certificate in theology. In addition, there is an extensive course offering in areas such as Bible, pastoral counselling, leadership and charismatic theology.

The school is owned and run by the Lutheran Swedish Evangelical Mission (in Swedish: Evangeliska fosterlandsstiftelsen) and began its existence as a training institute for inland and overseas missionaries. For the last several decades, however, Sweden's own need for church leaders and clergy has been the school's primary focus. Most students enroll today with an eye to future ministry in Sweden, although a number of students also end up working internationally in a variety of mission agencies or pursue doctoral studies in theology.

The school has several internationally well-renowned scholars as affiliated researchers or professors, and publishes the peer-reviewed Nordic academic journal Theofilos in cooperation with NLA University College, Norway.

The school has exchange programmes with the following theological institutions:

- Luther Seminary in Saint Paul, Minnesota, USA
- Wycliffe Hall of Oxford University, England
- Ethiopian Graduate School of Theology in Addis Ababa, Ethiopia
- MF Norwegian School of Theology in Oslo, Norway

In 2018 Johannelund came under new leadership with Docent James Starr as president.
