= Den svenska psalmboken (1819) =

1819 Church of Sweden hymnal

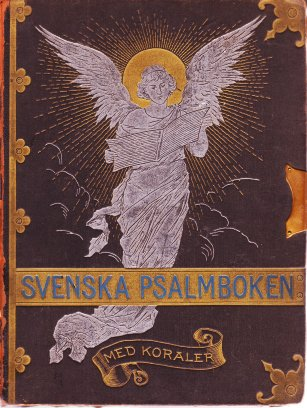
Deluxe edition from 1899. Fröléen & Comp. Lyrics, music, illustrations, gospel texts, etc.

Den svenska psalmboken – av Konungen gillad och stadfäst(ad) år 1819 ('The Swedish hymnal – approved and confirmed by the king in 1819'), also called the 1819 Hymnal and the Wallin Hymnal, was used in Sweden from 1819 to 1937 (with Haeffner's chorale book) and contained 500 hymns.

The hymnbook was "approved and confirmed by the king" on 29 January 1819, but was not introduced for exclusive use throughout the country by one collective decision. Rather, it was successively adopted by each parish in the Church of Sweden by a separate decision at parish board meetings. From 1921 it was used together with a supplement, Nya psalmer, which included hymns by revivalists Lina Sandell and Carl Olof Rosenius.

The hymnal was in that sense the work of one man, as over half of the hymns were written or adapted by archbishop Johan Olof Wallin (1779–1839), but other poets such as Frans Michael Franzén (1772–1847) and Erik Gustaf Geijer (1783–1847) were also involved. Other participants with numerous hymns include vicar Johan Åström (1767–1844) and professor Samuel Ödmann (1750–1829). Three hymns (0.6%) were written by women.

Its content and style have been described as "on the border of the Age of Enlightenment and the Romantic Era."

Other collections of hymns and songs during this period included selections from the 1819 hymnal, sometimes with only certain verses included, such as in the Swedish Evangelical Mission's Sionstoner (1889) and the Stockholms söndagsskolförenings sångbok (Stockholm Sunday School Association's hymnal; 1882).

== See also ==
- Den svenska psalmboken (1986)
- Hymnody of continental Europe
