= Swedeburg, Nebraska =

Unincorporated community in Nebraska, U.S.

Coordinates: 41°08′10″N 96°37′29″W

Swedeburg is an unincorporated community in Saunders County, Nebraska, United States.

== History ==
The first settlement was made at Swedeburg in 1869. A post office was established at Swedeburg (historically also spelled Swedeburgh) in 1873, and remained in operation until it was discontinued in 1972. A large share of the early settlers being natives of Sweden caused the name to be selected.
