= Tryggare kan ingen vara =

Christian hymn by Lina Sandell

- Christian song
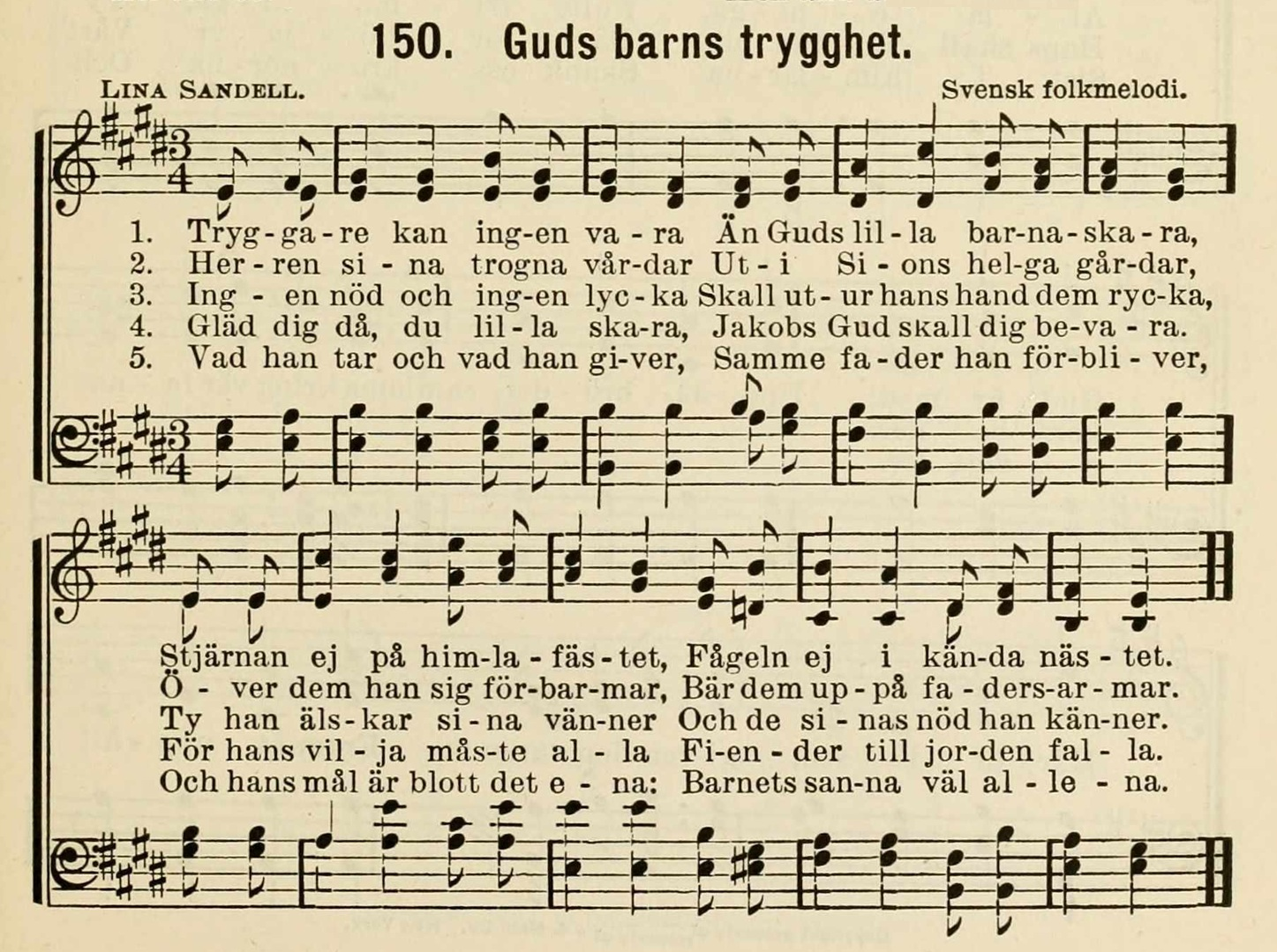
- English: "Children of the Heavenly Father"
- Written: 1850?
- Text: by Lina Sandell
- Language: Swedish
- Published: 1855

"Tryggare kan ingen vara" (English version: "Children of the Heavenly Father") is a Christian hymn with lyrics by Lina Sandell circa 1850, and published in 1855 Andeliga daggdroppar, where the writer was credited as anonymous. It was recorded by Carola Häggkvist in 1998 on her ninth studio album Blott en dag. It has also been used in the film soundtrack for the 1987 film More About the Children of Noisy Village.

The melody has been credited to a Swedish version of a German folk tune, but in Koralbok för Nya psalmer, 1921, two different melodies are credited, one 1919 A melody by Ivar Widéen, and another credited as a "folk tune". It is usually heard at baptisms, and sometimes during funerals and Christmas.

In 1925, the song was given lyrics in English, as "Children of the Heavenly Father", written by Ernst W. Olson.

== Publications ==
- Lovsånger och andeliga visor 1877 as number 87 med 10 verses entitled "Guds barns trygghet".
- Stockholms söndagsskolförenings sångbok 1882 as number 51 under the lines Sånger af allmänt innehåll, with five verses, entitled "Guds barns trygghet".
- Metodistkyrkans psalmbok 1896 as number 393, 6 verses, under the lines "Kristi kyrka" in a version credited Fr. Engelke.
- Herde-Rösten 1892 as number 45 under the lines "Guds barns trygghet".
- Svensk söndagsskolsångbok 1908 as number 194 under the lines "Guds barns trygghet"
- Lilla Psalmisten 1909 as number 89 under the lines "Frälsningen".
- Svenska Missionsförbundets sångbok 1920 as number 326 under the lines "Guds barns trygghet".
- Nya psalmer 1921 as number 622, additional songs for 1819 års psalmbok under the lines "Det kristliga troslivet: Troslivet i hem och samhälle: Det kristna hemmet: Äkta makar + några okända rubriker".
- Svensk söndagsskolsångbok 1929 as number 134 under the lines "Guds barns glädje och trygghet"
- Frälsningsarméns sångbok 1929 as number 356 under the lines "Jubel, erfarenhet och vittnesbörd"
- Psalm och Sång 1929/31, as number 130 under the lines "Trosvisshet och barnaskap"
- Musik till Frälsningsarméns sångbok 1930 as number 356
- Segertoner 1930 as number 345
- Sionstoner 1935 as number 352 under the lines "Nådens ordning: Trosliv och helgelse".
- Guds lov 1935 as number 540 under the lines "Barnsånger".
- 1937 års psalmbok as number 513 under the lines "Barn".
- Segertoner 1960 as number 344
- Psalmer för bruk vid krigsmakten 1961 as number 513, verses 1–5.
- Frälsningsarméns sångbok 1968 as number 423 under the lines " - Erfarenhet och vittnesbörd"
- Den svenska psalmboken 1986 1986 års Cecilia-psalmbok, Psalmer och Sånger 1987, Segertoner 1988 and Frälsningsarméns sångbok 1990 under the lines "Förtröstan - trygghet" as number 248.
- Lova Herren 1988 as number 750 under the lines "Barn och ungdom".
- Barnens svenska sångbok, 1999, under the lines "Hemma i världen".
- All God's People Sing. Song number 80 in English by Bobb, Barry, published St. Louis: Concordia Publishing House, 1992, 316 pp. All God's People Sing. is a Christian children's songbook
- Hymns of the Church of Jesus Christ of Latter-day Saints, as number 299 under the lines "Children of Our Heavenly Father"

== Misheard lyrics ==
According to the book Det är saligt att samla citron, some children have misheard the lyrics:

- Bryggare kan ingen vara
- Trygga räkan (kan) ingen vara
- Tryggare kan ingen vara, än Guds lilla barn i Skara
