= Robert Leaf =

- Born: Robert Daniel Leaf; February 20, 1936; Lindsborg, Kansas, U.S.
- Died: October 11, 2005 (aged 69)
- Occupation: Composer

Robert Daniel Leaf (February 20, 1936 – October 11, 2005) was an American composer.

Robert Daniel Leaf was born and raised in Lindsborg, Kansas. The son of Bernard and Judith Valine Leaf, he attended Luther Academy and College in Wahoo, Nebraska, played trumpet in the Air Force band, and completed his undergraduate degree at MacPhail School of Music in Minneapolis, Minnesota.

After a short career as an elementary school music teacher and a series of records of children's music; he enrolled in graduate studies in composition at the University of Minnesota. Having nearly completed the program, he began composing hymns and secular choral music from the home he shared with his wife and three children in suburban Brooklyn Park, Minnesota.

Leaf was especially interested in music for hymns and was completing a book on the subject at the time of his death. He promoted the value of hymn as one of the last commonplace examples of community singing, outside of Happy Birthday to You and the national anthem. He wrote both instrumental and vocal music and was published by Broadman, Augsburg, and Choristers Guild. Much of his late music included solo instrumental additions to choral arrangement.

He married Barbara Harmon. They had three sons. His wife died in March 2005, and he died later that year, at age 69.

== Compositions ==
- "There is a Joy (in Each New Day)" (1988)
- "To the Glory of Our King"
- "As the Angels Said"
- "Fill the House of God"
- "Come on Down, Zacchaeus"
- "My Faith"
- "That Easter Morn at Break of Day"
