= Oscar Ahnfelt =

Swedish composer and musician

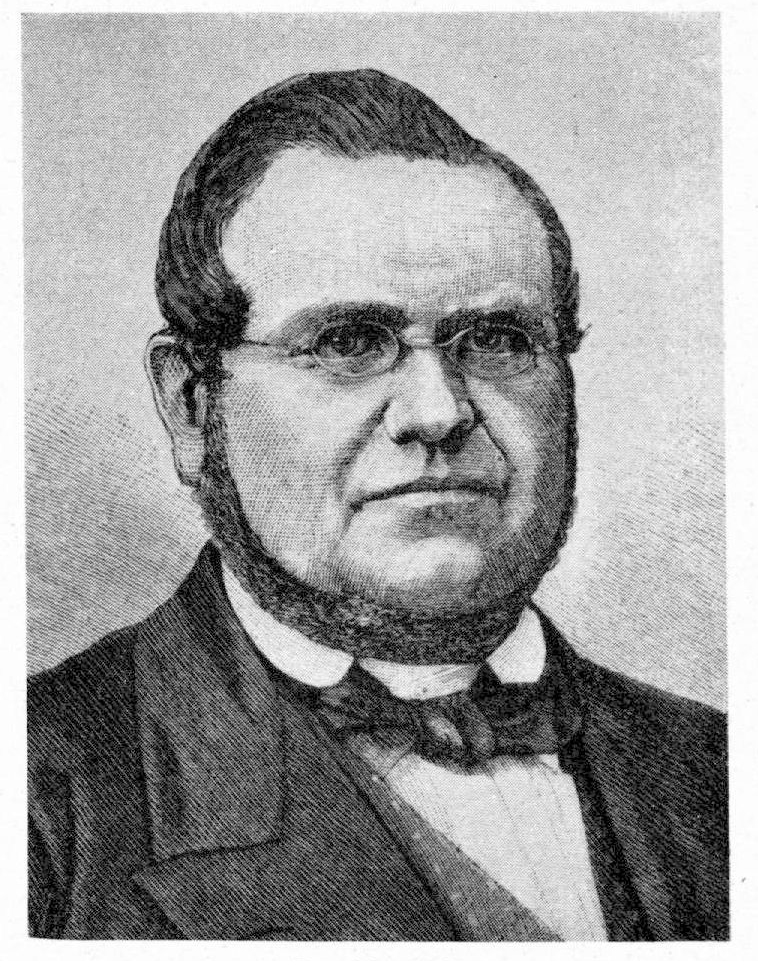
- Born: May 21, 1813; Gullarp, Skåne
- Died: October 22, 1882 (aged 69); Karlshamn, Blekinge
- Occupations: singer, composer, publisher
- Spouse: Clara Strömberg

Oscar Ahnfelt (1813–1882) was a Swedish singer, composer and music publisher.

== Biography ==
Ahnfelt composed the music for many of Lina Sandell's hymns. He was a pietist, who traveled all over Scandinavia, playing his 10-string guitar and singing her lyrics. The state church authorities did not like pietistic hymns and, anticipating a royal injunction against the singing of Sandell's songs, ordered Ahnfelt to sing them before King Karl XV. But after hearing them, the King announced to Ahnfelt, "You may sing as much as you desire in both of my kingdoms." Ahnfelt sang them so much that Sandell wrote, "Ahnfelt has sung my songs into the hearts of the people."

Sandell–Ahnfelt hymns have spread throughout the world. Two of the best-known ones in English are Children of the Heavenly Father (Tryggare kan ingen vara) and Day by day (Blott en dag).

Jenny Lind, known worldwide as the "Swedish Nightingale", was also a pietist and popularized Sandell's hymns in the United States and wherever she sang. She additionally helped finance Ahnfelt's Andeliga Sånger (Sacred Songs), first published in 1850.

Ahnfelt died October 22, 1882, in Karlshamn, Blekinge. He is buried in Hvilans Kyrkogård (Hvilans Cemetery) in Karlshamn.

== Selected hymns ==
The following hymns have melodies composed by Oscar Ahnfelt.

- Blott en dag: lyrics by Lina Sandell
- Guds barn jag är: lyrics by Carl Olof Rosenius
- Herrens nåd är var morgon ny: lyrics by Lina Sandell
- I en djup, oändlig skog: lyrics by Carl Olof Rosenius
- Jag är främling: lyrics by Betty Ehrenborg and Carl Olof Rosenius.
- Tänk, när en gång det töcken har försvunnit: lyrics by Carl Olof Rosenius
- Ängsliga hjärta: lyrics by Carl Olof Rosenius
- Är det sant att Jesus är min broder: lyrics by Lina Sandell
