= Lina Sandell =

Swedish writer

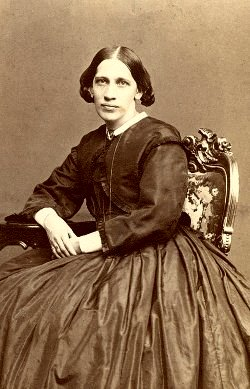
- Born: Karolina Wilhelmina Sandell; 3 October 1832; Fröderyd, Sweden
- Died: 27 July 1903 (aged 70); Stockholm, Sweden
- Occupation: Hymnwriter
- Spouse(s): Carl Oscar Berg, m. 1867

Lina Sandell (full name: Karolina Wilhelmina Sandell-Berg) (3 October 1832 – 27 July 1903) was a Swedish poet and author of gospel hymns.

== Background ==
The daughter of a Lutheran minister, Sandell grew up in the rectory at Fröderyd parish in the Diocese of Växjö in Småland, Sweden. Lina greatly loved and admired her father. Since she was a frail youngster, she generally preferred to be with him in his study rather than with comrades outdoors. When Lina was just 12 years of age, she had an experience that greatly shaped her entire life. At an early age she had been stricken with a partial paralysis that confined her to bed much of the time. Though the physicians considered her chance for a complete recovery hopeless, her parents always believed that God would in time make her well again. One Sunday morning, while her parents were in church, Lina began reading the Bible and praying earnestly. When her parents returned, they were amazed to find her dressed and walking freely. After this experience of physical healing, Lina began to write verses expressing her gratitude and love for God and published her first book of spiritual poetry when she was 16. At the age of 26 she accompanied her father, Jonas Sandell, on a boat trip across Lake Vättern, during which he fell overboard and drowned in her presence. Although Lina had written many hymn texts prior to this tragic experience, now more than ever poetic thoughts began to flow from her broken heart. All of her hymns reflect a tender, childlike trust in her Savior and a deep sense of his abiding presence in her life.

== Career ==
Sandell went on to write over six hundred hymns, including Tryggare kan ingen vara (Children of the Heavenly Father) and Blott en dag (Day by day). Some were published in the 1819 Church of Sweden hymnal, Den svenska psalmboken. She was friends with fellow hymnwriter Agatha Rosenius.

Sandell's popularity owed much to the performances of Oscar Ahnfelt, who set many of her verses to music. He played his guitar and sang her hymns throughout Scandinavia. Of him she once said, "Ahnfelt has sung my songs into the hearts of the people". The "Swedish Nightingale" Jenny Lind also promoted Sandell's hymns by singing them in concert and financing their publication.

It was in the midst of the Rosenius movement that Lina Sandell became known to her countrymen as a great songwriter. Rosenius and Ahnfelt encountered much persecution in their evangelical efforts. King Karl XV, ruler of the united kingdoms of Sweden and Norway, was petitioned to forbid Ahnfelt’s preaching and singing. The monarch refused until he had had an opportunity to hear the “spiritual troubadour.” Ahnfelt was commanded to appear at the royal palace. Being considerably perturbed in mind as to what he should sing to the king, he besought Lina Sandell to write a hymn for the occasion. She was equal to the task and within a few days the song was ready. With his guitar under his arm and the hymn in his pocket, Ahnfelt repaired to the palace and sang:

Who is it that knocketh upon your heart’s door
In peaceful eve?
Who is it that brings to the wounded and sore
The balm that can heal and relieve?
Your heart is still restless, it findeth no peace
In earth’s pleasures;
Your soul is still yearning, it seeketh release
To rise to the heavenly treasures.

The king listened with tears in his eyes. When Ahnfelt had finished, the monarch gripped him by the hand and exclaimed: "You may sing as much as you like in both of my kingdoms!"

== Personal life ==
She was married in 1867 to wholesale merchant and future member of the Swedish Parliament, Oscar Berg (politician) (1839–1903). They established their residence in Stockholm. Their only child died at birth. Sandell was friends with and mentored by member of Parliament Thor Hartwig Odencrants. In 1892, Sandell became ill with typhoid fever. She died in 1903 at the age of seventy and was buried at Solna Church in greater Stockholm. Berg died due to complications caused by diabetes in October that same year.

== Legacy ==
The train Y32 1404, of Krösatågen in Småland and Halland, which moves across the railway tracks between Jönköping-Växjö, Nässjö-Halmstad and Jönköping-Tranås, has been named Lina Sandell.

There is a statue of Sandell at North Park University in Chicago, Illinois.
