= Den svenska psalmboken (1986) =

1986 Swedish ecumenical hymnal

Den svenska psalmboken – antagen av 1986 års kyrkomöte ('The Swedish hymnal – adopted by the 1986 Church Council') is the fourth official hymnal of the Church of Sweden.

The process to create a new hymnal began in earnest in 1958 when Rune Pär Olofsson published a critique of the existing 1937 hymnal. The new hymnal was approved at the general conference of the Church of Sweden on August 29, 1986. Many hyms are shared with other denominations and movements, owing to a deliberate ecumenical effort.

== See also ==
- Den svenska psalmboken (1819)
- Hymnody of continental Europe
